= 1400–1500 in European fashion =

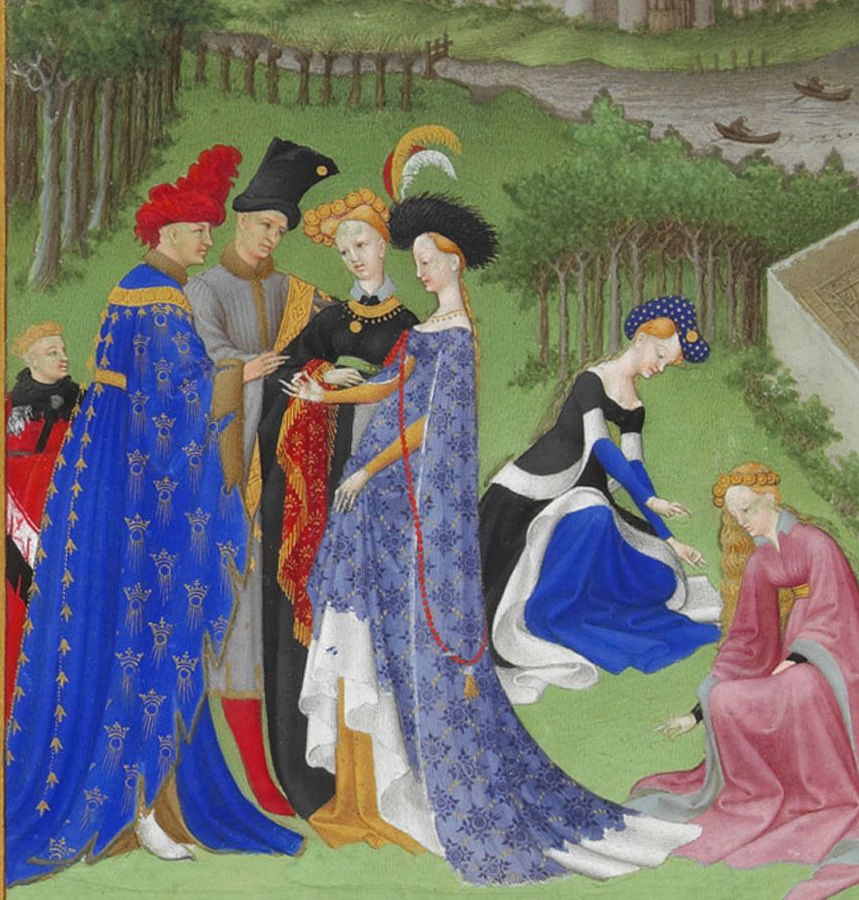
Full-bodied houppelandes with voluminous sleeves worn with elaborate headdresses are characteristic of the earlier 15th century. Detail from Très Riches Heures du Duc de Berry.

Fashion in 15th-century Europe was characterized by a surge of experimentation and regional variety, from the voluminous robes called houppelandes with their sweeping floor-length sleeves to the revealing giornea of Renaissance Italy. Hats, hoods, and other headdresses assumed increasing importance, and were draped, jeweled, and feathered.

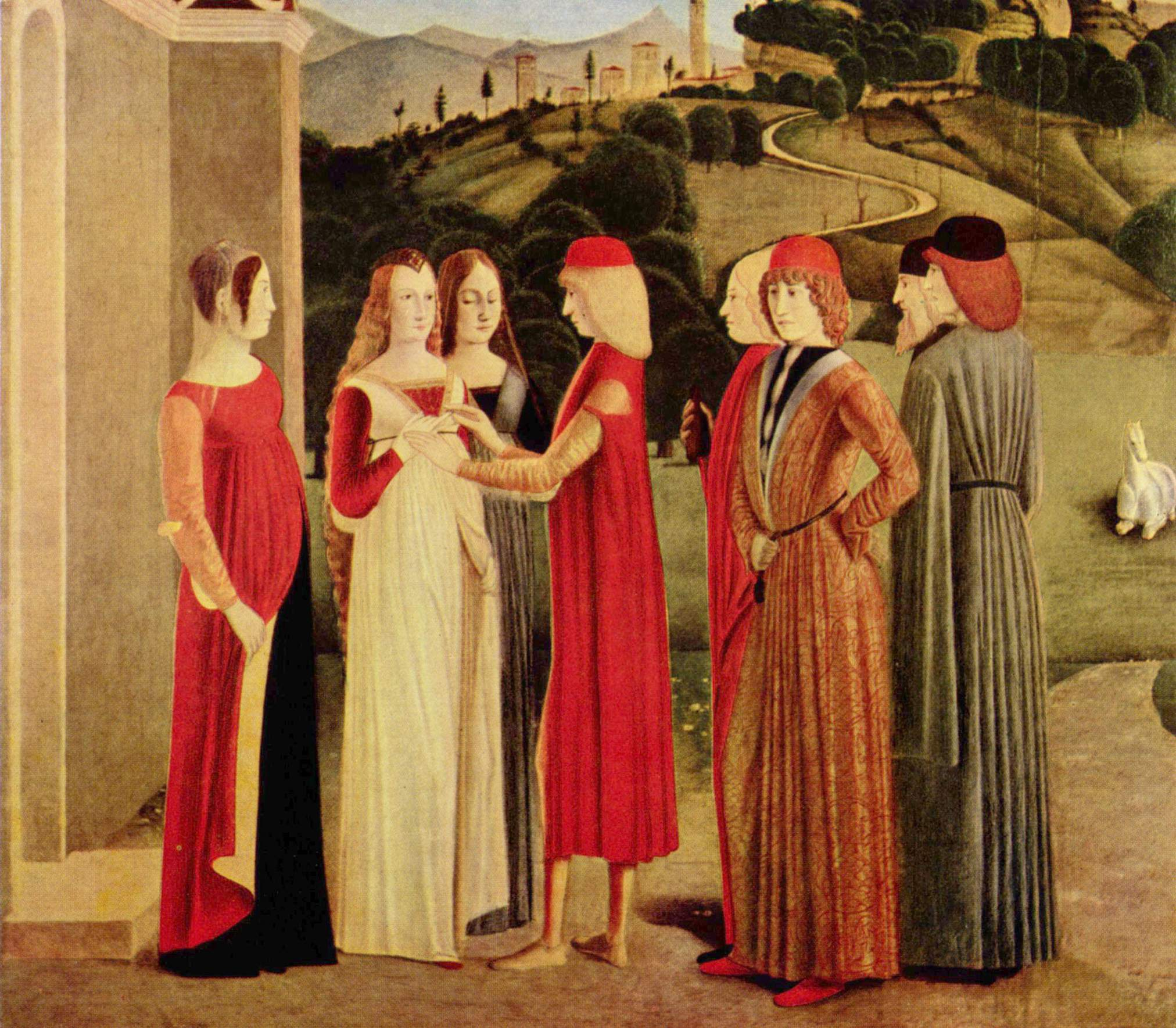
Young Italian men wear brimless caps, The Betrothal, c. 1470

As Europe continued to grow more prosperous, the urban middle classes began to wear more complex clothes that followed, at a distance, the fashions set by the elites. It is in this time period that fashion took on a temporal aspect, with "out of date" clothing a new social concern. Regional variations in clothing increased across the 15th century.

== Trends ==
=== Dominance of the Burgundian court ===
Throughout most of the 15th century, European fashion north of the Alps was dominated by the court of the Duchy of Burgundy, especially under the fashion-conscious power-broker Philip the Good (ruled 1419–1469). Having added Holland and Flanders to their dominion, the Dukes of Burgundy had access to the latest fabrics of Italy and the East and to English wool exports through the large trading cities of Bruges and Antwerp. Importing fabrics through Italian trade networks amounted to a significant proportion of Burgundian expenditure, with two percent being paid to the Lucchese merchant Giovanni Arnolfini alone. However, the widespread sumptuary laws in the Italian city states, which prevented citizens from wearing luxurious cloths and the conflict between England and France throughout the Hundred Years War and the Wars of the Roses led to Burgundy's dominance in fashion of the period.

The defeat of Charles the Bold at the Battle of Grandson in 1476 led to Burgundy's decline as a fount of culture and fashion. Charles' heir, Mary of Burgundy, married Maximilian I, Holy Roman Emperor but died young. In the last decade of the 15th century, Charles VIII of France invaded Italy and was briefly declared King of Naples. As a result, the French nobility were introduced to the new fabrics and styles of Italy, which would combine with German influence to become mainstream fashion of the nobility in France (and later spread to England) in the first half of the 16th century.

=== Fabrics and fur ===
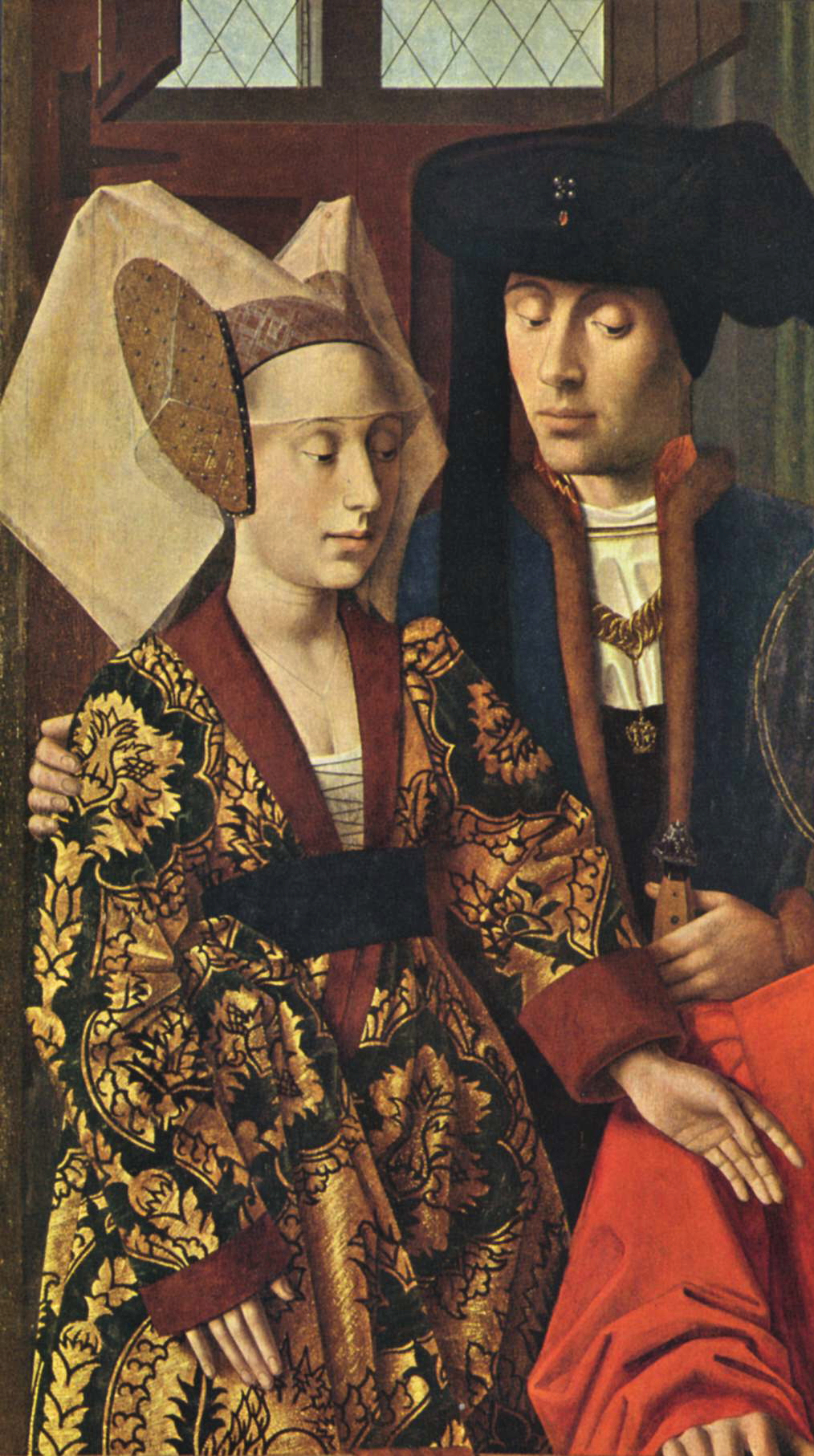
Bold pomegranate- or artichoke-patterned silks are characteristic of the 15th century, as are richly coloured velvets and woolens. Fine linen was important for headdresses and for the shirts and chemises revealed by new lower necklines and slashing.

At all levels of society, wool continued to be the predominant material for fabrics, exceeding by far the next most important textile sources, linen and hemp. Wool fabrics were available in a wide range of qualities, from rough undyed cloth to fine, dense broadcloth with a velvety nap. High-value broadcloth was a backbone of the English economy and was exported throughout Europe. Wool fabrics were dyed in rich colours, notably reds, greens, blues, and even shades of pink and purple, although the blue colour achievable by dyeing with woad (and less frequently indigo) could not match the characteristic rich lapis lazuli blues depicted in contemporary illuminated manuscripts such as the Très Riches Heures du duc de Berry. Cloth of gold and samite were among the luxurious fabrics forbidden to the urban classes across Europe.

Silk weaving was well established around the Mediterranean by the beginning of the 15th century, and figured silks, often silk velvets with silver-gilt wefts, are increasingly seen in Italian dress and in the dress of the wealthy throughout Europe. By the 14th century, floral designs featuring pomegranate motifs had reached Europe from (northern) China and Central Asia, becoming dominant in the stately variations designed by the silk weavers of Florence, Genoa, Venice, Valencia, and Seville and in the Ottoman silk-producing cities of Istanbul and Bursa, from this period and into the 1400s.

Towards the end of the 14th century, Italian silk and velvet manufacturers were applying their advanced weaving skills to achieve ever more complex designs. By the 15th century, they were creating bold and intricate variations on an undulating "pomegranate pattern" (a name applied later, to encompass any design incorporating the pomegranate motif, even where the motifs came to more closely resemble flora such artichokes, thistles, lotus and palmettes). These grand, symmetrical, vegetal designs were seen most frequently in Europe between 1420 and 1550, almost to the exclusion of other pattern types.

Fur was mostly worn as a lining layer by those who could afford it. The grey and white squirrel furs of the Middle Ages, vair and miniver, went out of style except at court, first for men and then for women; the new fashionable furs were dark brown sable and marten. Toward the end of the 15th century, wild animal furs such as lynx became popular. Ermine remained the prerogative and hallmark of royalty.

== Women's fashion ==
=== Gown, kirtle, and chemise ===
A fur-trimmed Burgundian gown of the mid-15th century has a V-neck that displays the black kirtle and a band of the chemise. Hair is pulled back in an embroidered hennin and covered by a short veil.

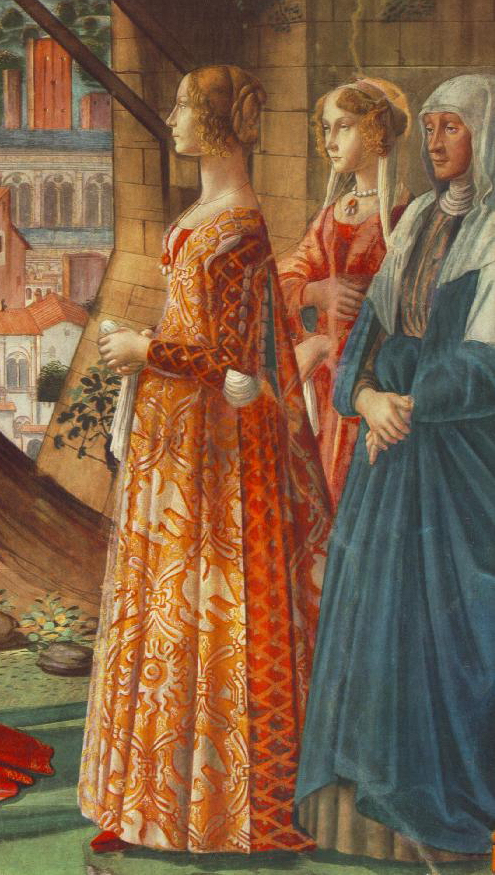
Giovanna Tornabuoni and her attendants in Italian fashion of the 1480s. The tight slashed sleeves reveal the full chemise sleeves beneath. She wears a giornea over a kirtle or gamurra.

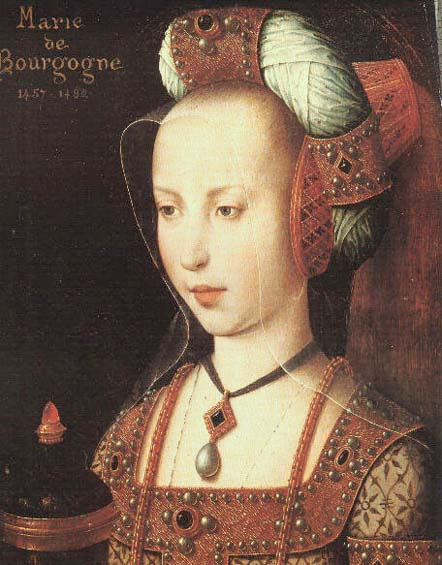
Mary of Burgundy wears a headdress comprising a truncated-cone hennin, a jewelled padded roll, and a sheer veil.

Women's fashions of the 15th century consisted of a long gown, usually with sleeves, worn over a kirtle or undergown, with a linen chemise or smock worn next to the skin. The sleeves were made detachable and were heavily ornamented. The long-waisted silhouette of the previous period was replaced by a high-waisted style with fullness over the belly, often confined by a belt. The wide, shallow scooped neckline was replaced by a V-neck, often cut low enough to reveal the decorated front of the kirtle beneath.

Various styles of overgowns were worn. The cotehardie fit smoothly from the shoulders to the hips and then flared by means of inserted triangular gores. It featured sleeves tight to the elbow with hanging streamers or tippets. The tight fit was achieved with lacing or buttons. This style faded rapidly from fashion in favor of the houppelande, a full robe with a high collar and wide sleeves that had become fashionable around 1380 and remained so until the mid-15th century. The later houppelande had sleeves that were snug at the wrist, making a full "bag" sleeve. The bag sleeve was sometimes slashed in the front to allow the lower arm to reach through.

Around 1450, the dress of northern Europe developed a low V-neck that showed a glimpse of the square-necked kirtle. The neckline could be filled in with a sheer linen partlet. Wide turn-backs like revers displayed a contrasting lining, frequently of fur or black velvet, and the sleeves might be cuffed to match. Sleeves were very long, covering half of the hand, and often highly decorated with embroidery. Fine sleeves were often transferred from one dress to another. The term robe déguisée was coined in the mid-1400s to describe garments reflecting the very latest fashions, a term which endured into the 16th century.

In Italy, the low scoop-neck of the early decades gave way to a neckline that was high in front with a lower V-neck at the back at mid-15th century. This was followed by a V-neckline that displayed the kirtle or gamurra (sometimes spelled camorra). Sleeveless overgowns such as the cioppa were popular, and the gamurra sleeves displayed were often of rich figured silks. The cotta was a lighter-weight undergown for summer wear. A sideless overgown called the giornea was worn with the gamurra or cotta. Toward the end of the period, sleeves were made in sections or panels and slashed, allowing the full chemise sleeves below to be pulled through in puffs along the arm, at the shoulder, and at the elbow. This was the beginning of the fashion for puffed and slashed sleeves that would last for two centuries.

The partlet, a separate item to fill in a low neckline, appeared in this period, usually of sheer fabric (linen or possibly silk) with an open V-neckline. Some partlets had a collar and a back similar to the upper part of a shirt. Burgundian partlets were usually depicted worn under the dress (but over the kirtle); in Italy the partlet seems to have been worn over the dress and could be pointed or cut straight across at the lower front.

Two uniquely Spanish fashions appeared from the 1470s. The verdugada or verdugado was a gown with a bell-shaped hoop skirt with visible casings stiffened with reeds, which would become the farthingale. The earliest depictions of this garment come from Catalonia, where it was worn with pieced or slashed sleeves and the second new style, a chemise with trumpet sleeves, open and very wide at the wrist.

The sideless surcoat of the 14th century became fossilised as a ceremonial costume for royalty, usually with an ermine front panel (called a plackard or placket) and a mantle draped from the shoulders; it can be seen in variety of royal portraits and as "shorthand" to identify queens in illuminated manuscripts of the period.

=== Hairstyles and headdresses ===
A variety of hats and headdresses were worn in Europe in the 15th century. The crespine of Northern Europe, originally a thick hairnet or snood, had evolved into a mesh of jeweler's work that confined the hair on the sides of the head by the end of the 14th century. Gradually the fullness at the sides of head was pulled up to the temples and became pointed, like horns (à corné). By mid-15th century, the hair was pulled back from the forehead, and the crespine, now usually called a caul, sat on the back of the head. Very fashionable women shaved their foreheads and eyebrows. Any of these styles could be topped by a padded roll, sometimes arranged in a heart-shape, or a veil, or both. Veils were supported by wire frames that exaggerated the shape and were variously draped from the back of the headdress or covered the forehead.

Women also wore the chaperon, a draped hat based on the hood and liripipe, and a variety of related draped and wrapped turbans.

The most extravagant headdress of Burgundian fashion was the hennin, a cone or truncated-cone shaped cap with a wire frame covered in fabric and topped by a floating veil. Later hennins featured a turned-back brim, or were worn over a hood with a turned-back brim. Towards the end of the 15th century women's head-dresses became smaller, more convenient, and less picturesque. The gable hood, a stiff and elaborate head-dress, emerged around 1480 and was popular among elder ladies up until the mid-16th century.

Women of the merchant classes in Northern Europe wore modified versions of courtly hairstyles, with coifs or caps, veils, and wimples of crisp linen (often with visible creases from ironing and folding). A brief fashion added rows of gathered frills to the coif or veil; this style is sometimes known by the German name kruseler.

The general European convention of completely covering married women's hair was not accepted in warmer Italy. Italian women wore their hair very long, wound with ribbons or braided, and twisted up into knots of various shapes with the ends hanging free. The hair was then covered with sheer veils or small caps. Toward the 1480s women wore chin-length sections of hair in loose waves or ripples over the ears. Blonde hair was considered desirable, evinced by Botticelli's blonde representations of Venus and the Virgin Mary. Visitors to Venice reported that ladies sat out in the sun on their terraces with their hair spread out around large circular disks worn like hats, attempting to bleach it in the sun. Chemical methods were also used. (Note: For the fashion of bleached blond hair in Venice, see Tortora and Eubanks (1994))

=== Women's footwear ===
Women from the 14th century wore laced ankle-boots, which were often lined with fur. Later in the 15th century, women began to wear long-toed footwear styled on men's poulaines. They used outer shoes called pattens—often themselves with elongated toes during this era—to protect their shoes proper while outside.

=== Style gallery – Northern Europe 1400s–1440s ===
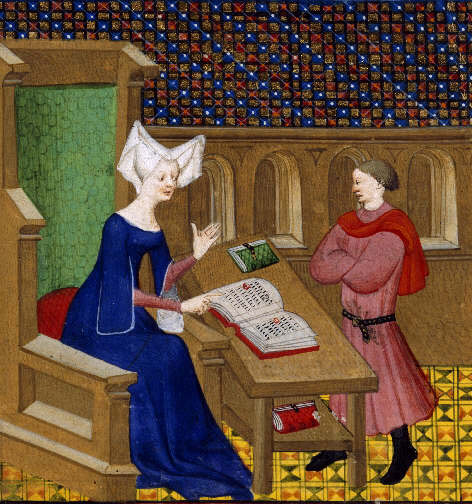
1 – 1410–1411

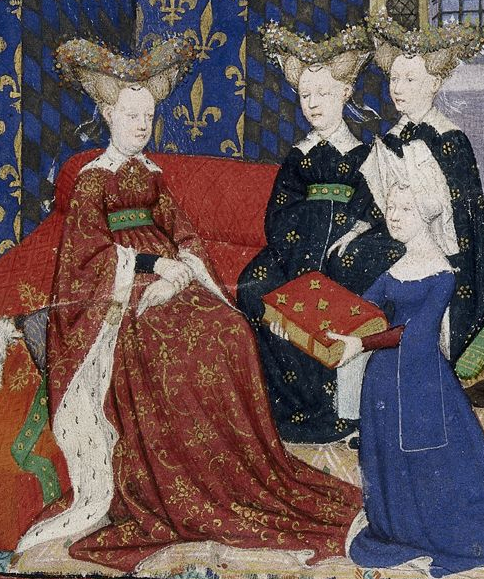
2 – 1410–1411

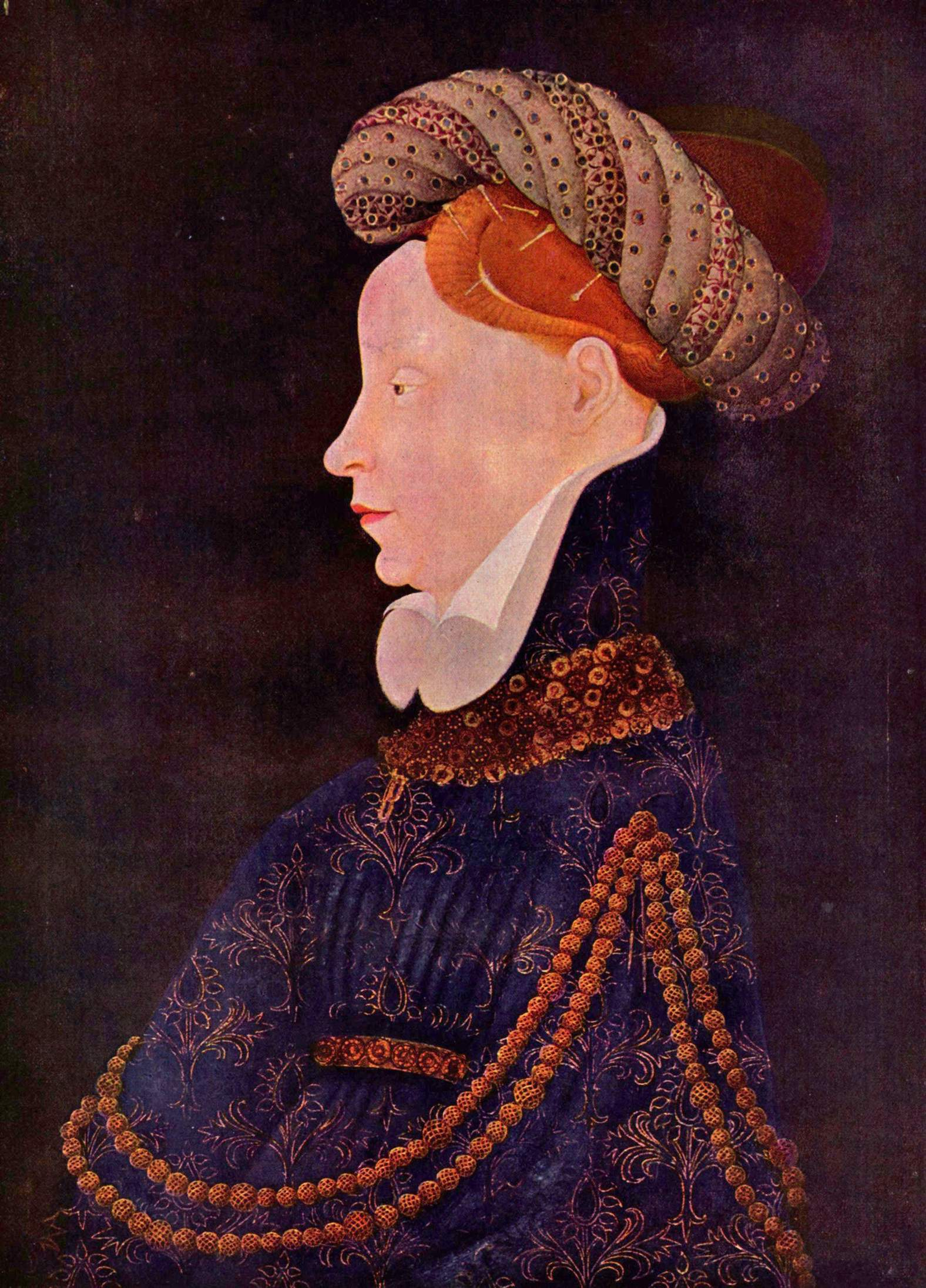
3 – c. 1410

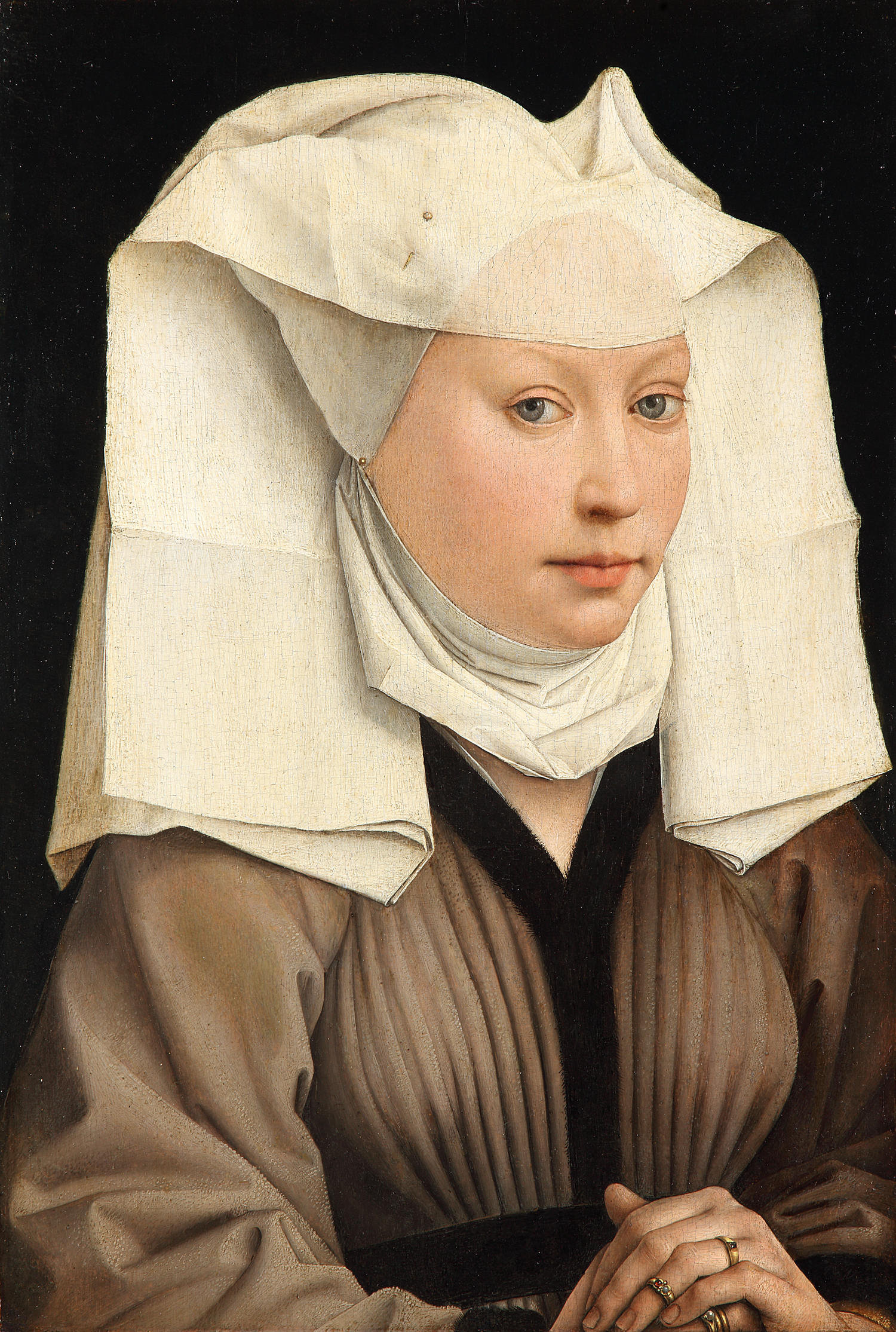
4 – 1430

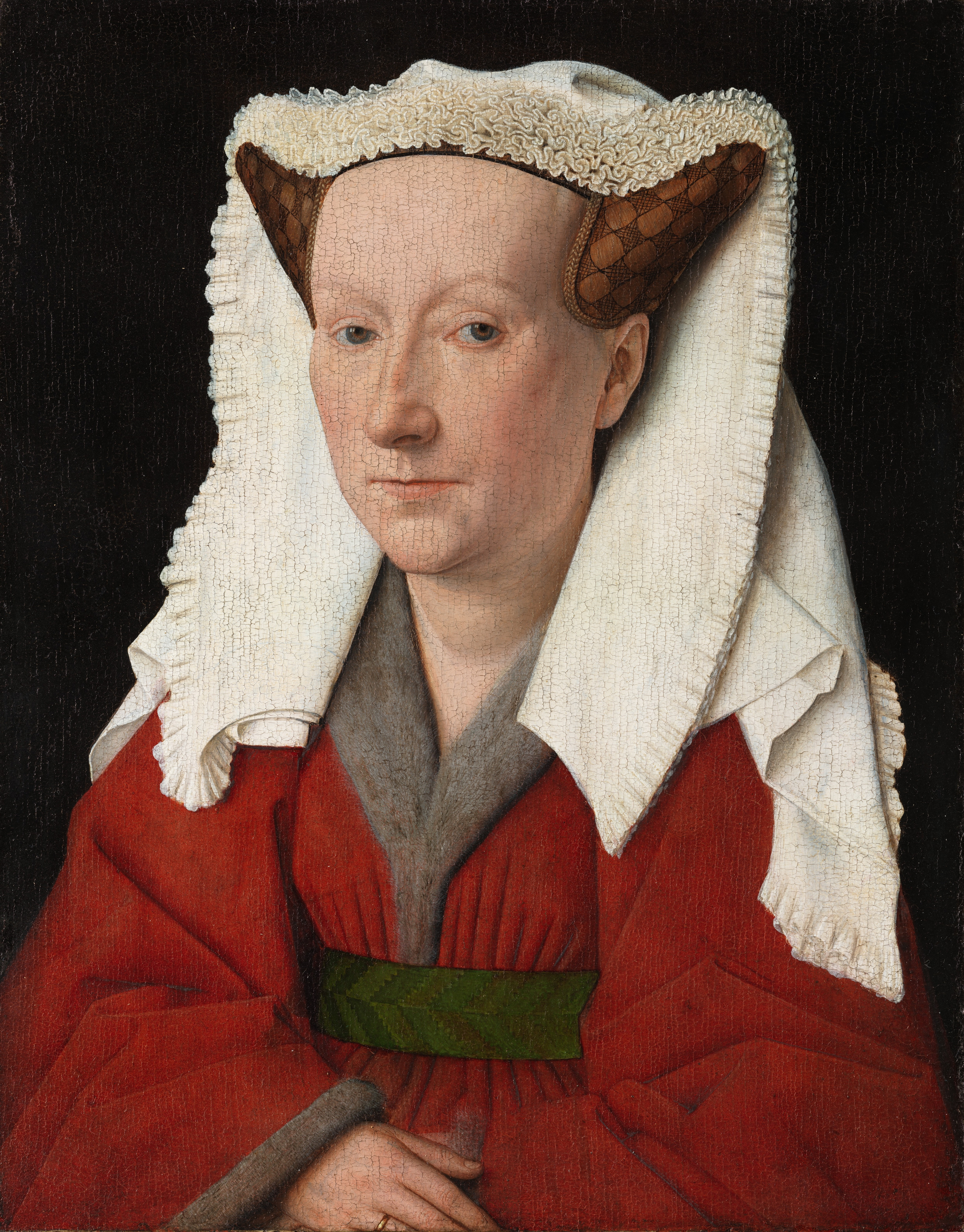
5 – 1439

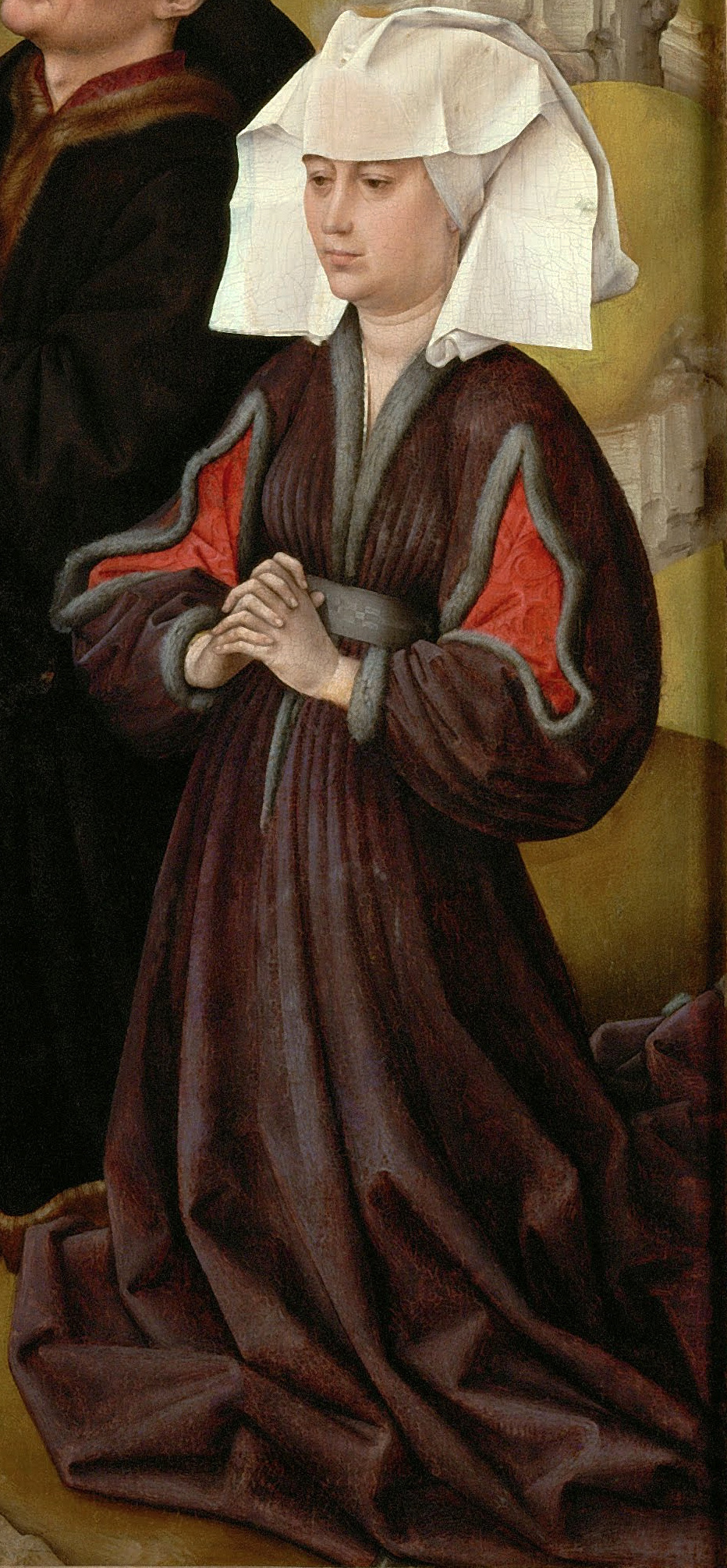
6 – 1443

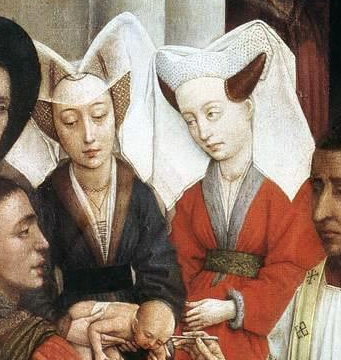
7 – 1445–1450

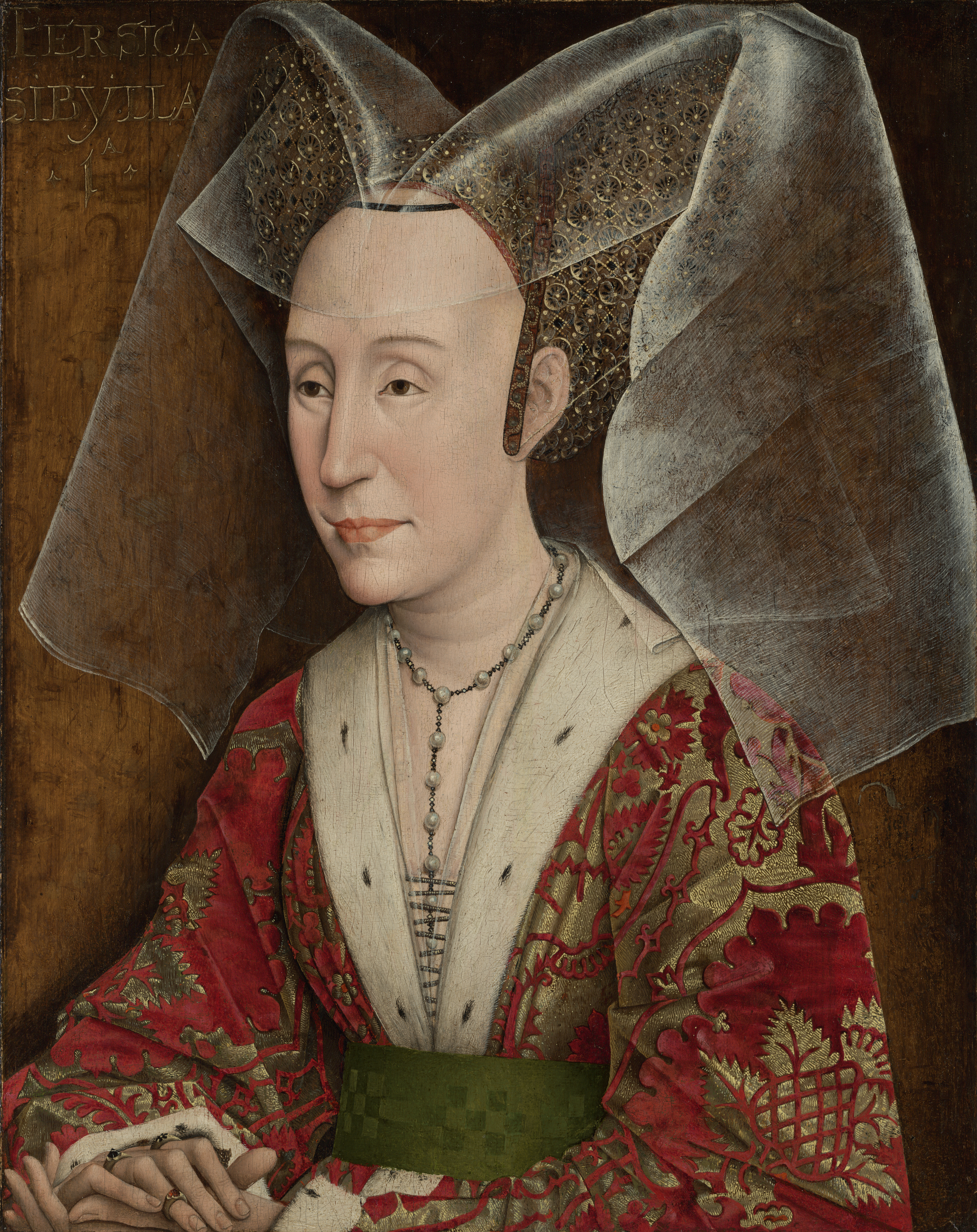
8 – 1445–1450

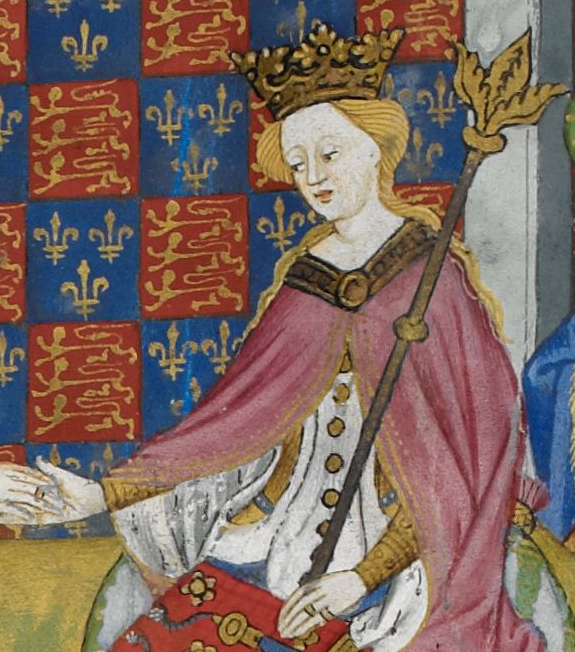
9 – 1445–1450
1. Christine de Pizan in a cotehardie. She wears a wired "horned" headdress with a veil. France, 1410–1411.
2. Christine de Pisan presents her book to Isabeau of Bavaria, Queen of France, who wears a figured houppelande lined in ermine with a broad collar and a heart-shaped headdress. Her books stress that women should dress appropriately to their station in life, as her own less sumptuous headdress here reflects. (Note: Depictions after de Pisan's death in 1430 tend to "promote" her socially.)
3. This woman wears a houppelande of dark blue figured fabric with a narrow belt. Her hair is shaved back from her forehead, and she wears a blunt pointed cap (now over-restored), France or Flanders, c. 1410. (Note: This, the earliest panel portrait of a woman, has been heavily restored or "improved" at various points, most recently by Lord Duveen in 1922–1923, who wanted it to become a Pisanello. The bee-hive hair above the cap should be ignored, and the striping and quilting in the cap are not seen in older photographs and drawings, where it appears flat and made from one piece of cloth. The clothes on the body are original apart from retouched areas. See Hand & Wolff (1986).)
4. A modestly dressed woman wears a linen headdress and a grey houppelande lined in black fur confined with a belt at the high waist. Her veil is pinned to her cap, and has sharp creases from ironing, Netherlands, 1430.
5. Margarete van Eyck wears a horned headdress with a ruffled veil called a kruseler. Her red houppelande is lined in grey fur, 1439.
6. Houppelande with fur-lined bag sleeves, Bruges, 1443.
7. Two women at a baptism (likely godmother and mother) wear heart-shaped headdresses with veils and belted, fur-lined gowns open at the front to display the chemises beneath, Burgundy, 1445–1450.
8. Isabella of Portugal, Duchess of Burgundy wears an elaborate embroidered and jeweled headdress with a sheer veil. Her gown is made of an artichoke-patterned red velvet on a gold ground, lined with ermine, and laces at the front opening. She wears a sheer linen partlet and a checkered belt, c. 1445–1450. (Note: On the dating of this image, see notes at Image:Rogier van der Weyden (workshop of) - Portrait of Isabella of Portugal.jpg)
9. Margaret of Anjou, Queen consort of Henry VI of England. She is wearing the close-fitting cotehardie with gold buttons and tight gold sleeves. Her red mantle is richly embroidered at the neck and clasped with a brooch.

=== Style gallery – Northern Europe 1450s–1470s ===
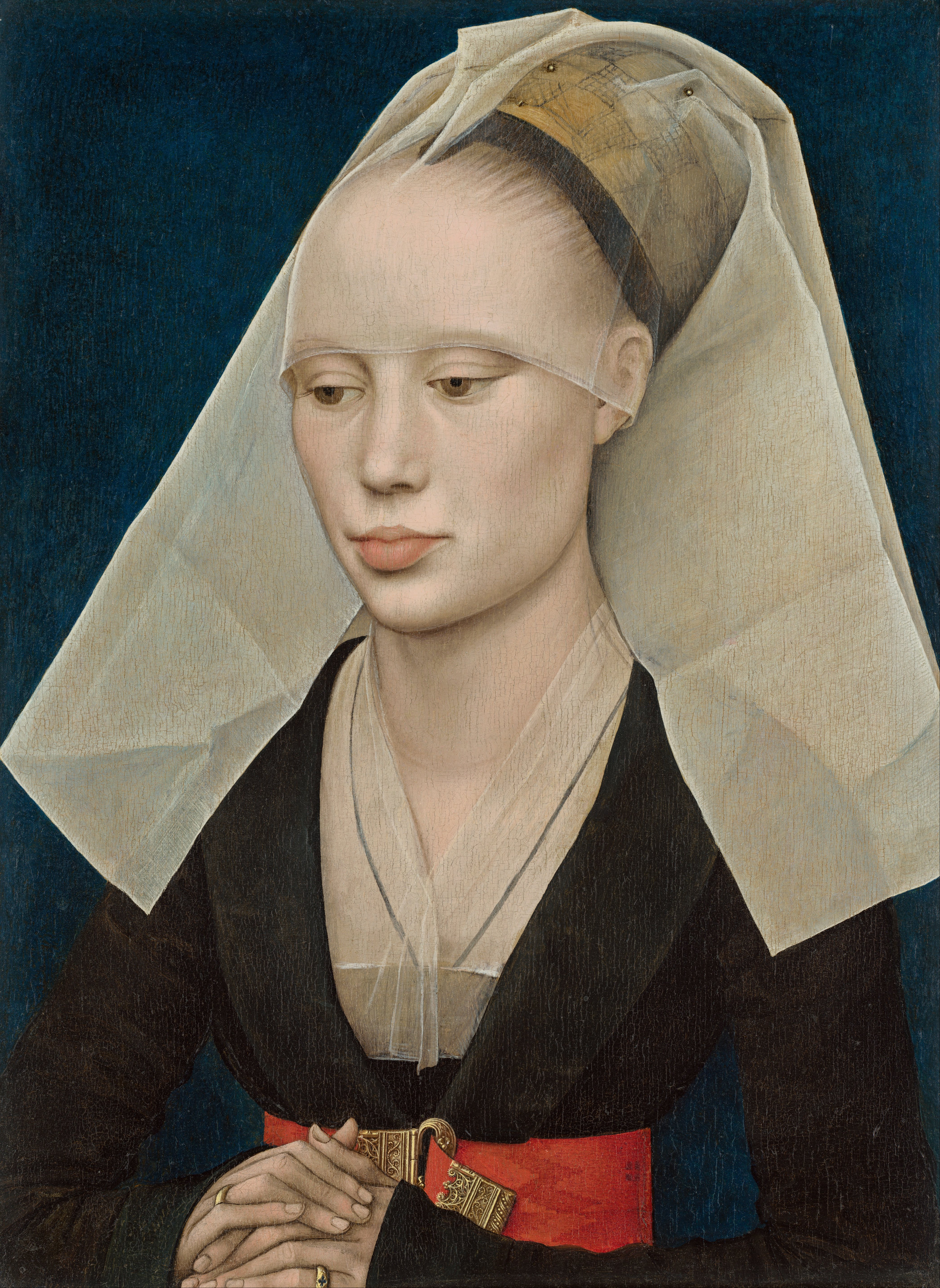
1 – c. 1455

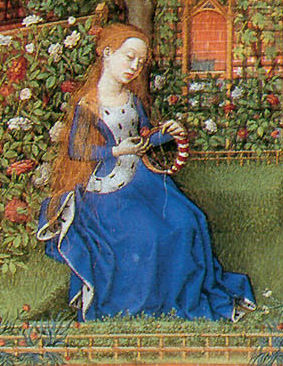
2 – c. 1460

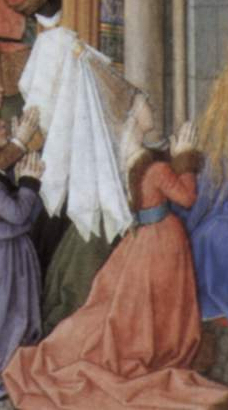
3 – c. 1460

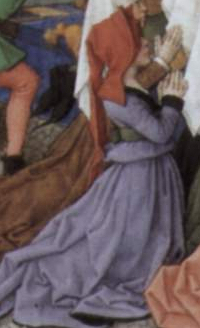
4 – c. 1460

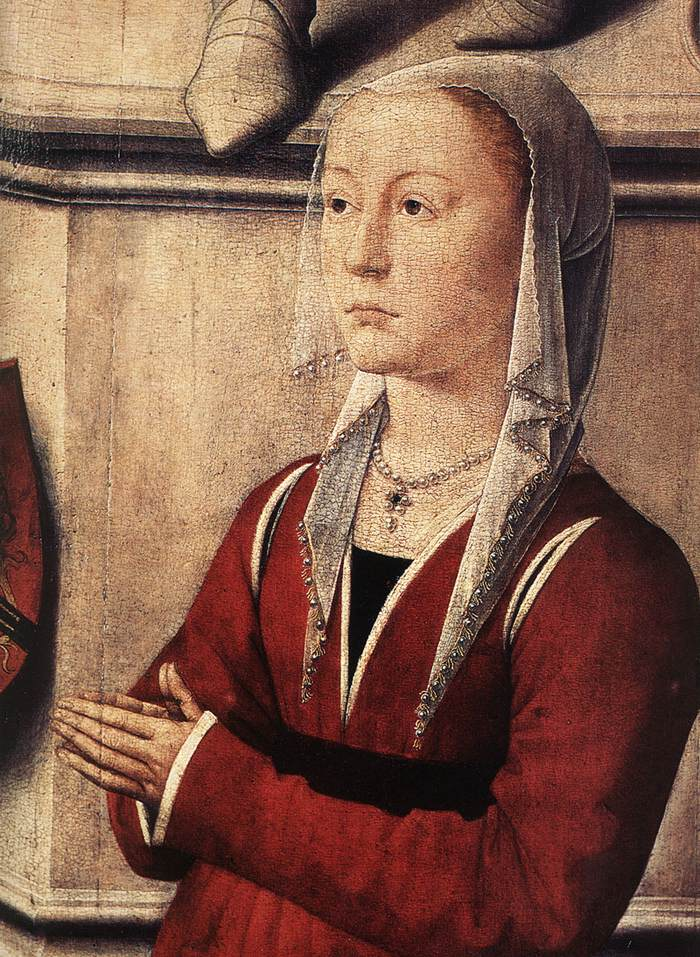
5 – 1467–1471

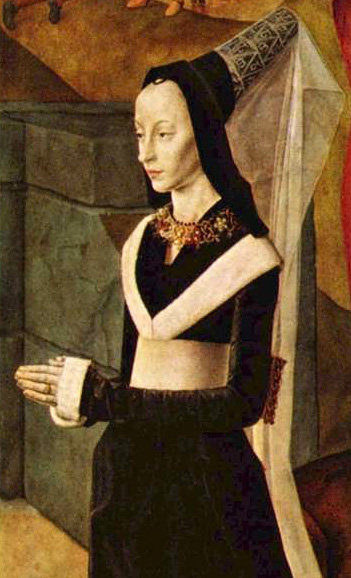
6 – 1476–1478

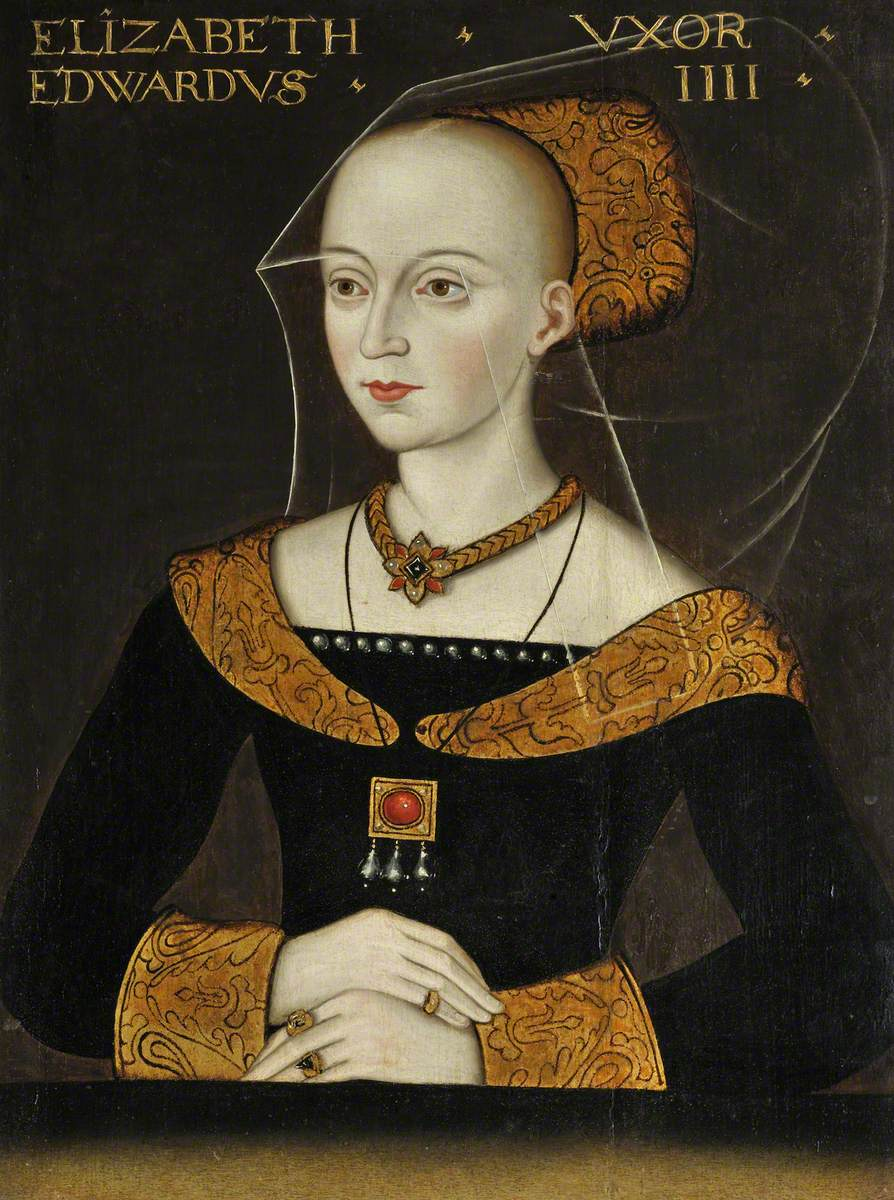
7 – ?1470s
1. This Portrait of a Lady by Rogier van der Weyden shows the hair pulled smoothly back from her face and confined in a caul or early hennin beneath a sheer veil. The gown has a wide V-neckline that shows the dark kirtle beneath and is worn with a wide red belt and a sheer partlet at the neck, Netherlands.
2. An illustration depicting Emilia from Boccaccio's Teseida shows the formal ermine-trimmed sideless surcoat that identifies royalty in illuminated manuscripts of this period, 1460.
3. Ladies in another illustration from Boccaccio wear tall steeple hennins with white veils. A long gown with a train has fur at the cuffs and neckline and is worn with a wide belt, c. 1460.
4. An attendant in the same illustration wears a red hood with a long liripipe. Her blue dress is "kirtled" or shortened by poufing it over a belt, c. 1460.
5. Woman wears a simple headdress of draped linen and a red houppelande trimmed with white fur. Note that the sleeve is only attached to the dress at the top, 1467–1471.
6. Maria Portinari wears a truncated cone hennin with a veil draped over the back. The black loop on her forehead is thought to be part of the wire frame that balances the hennin. Her houppelande has a black collar trimmed in white fur and she wears an elaborate carcanet (necklace), Netherlands, 1478–1478.
7. Elizabeth Woodville, Queen consort of Edward IV of England, wears a black gown with patterned collar and cuffs and a matching truncated English hennin beneath a sheer veil, c. 1470s. (Note: This is one of several extant copies of a work likely from life, between her marriage in 1464 and the death of her husband in 1483; a brass rubbing dated 1479 with the same style of headdress and neckline is shown in Payne (1965).)

=== Style gallery – Northern Europe 1480s–1490s ===
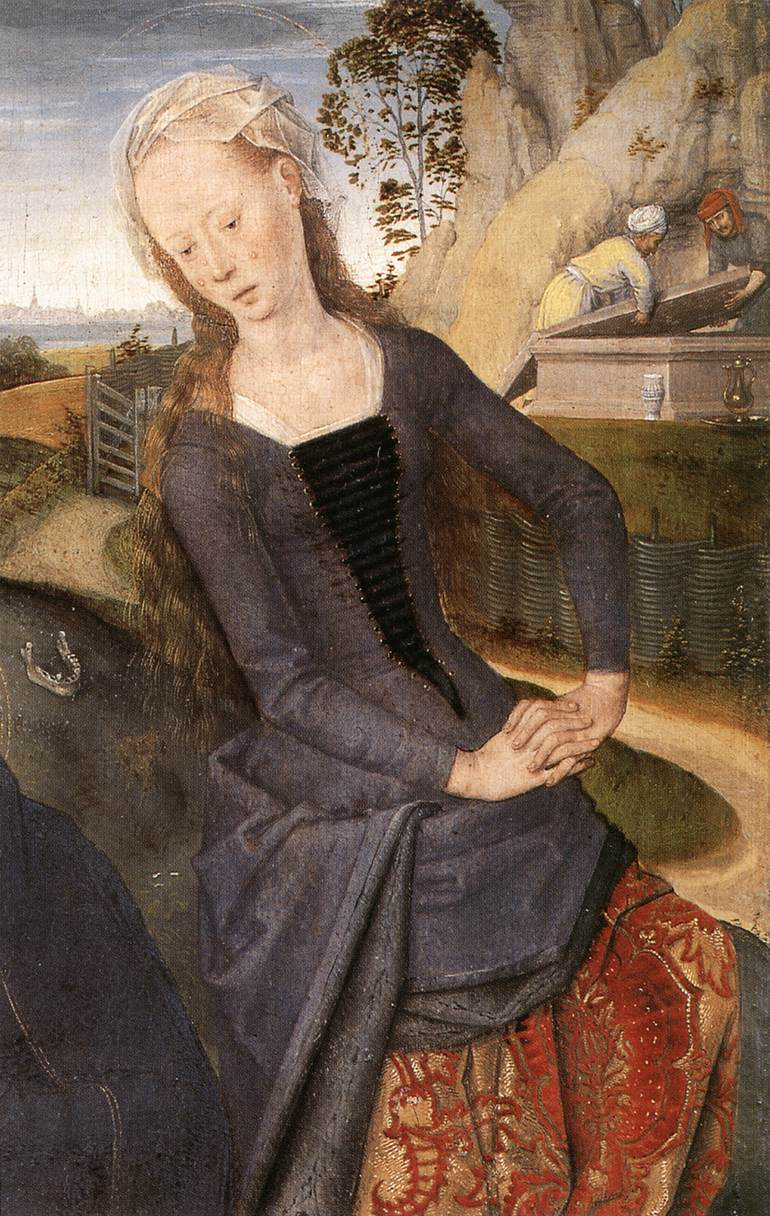
1 – 1480

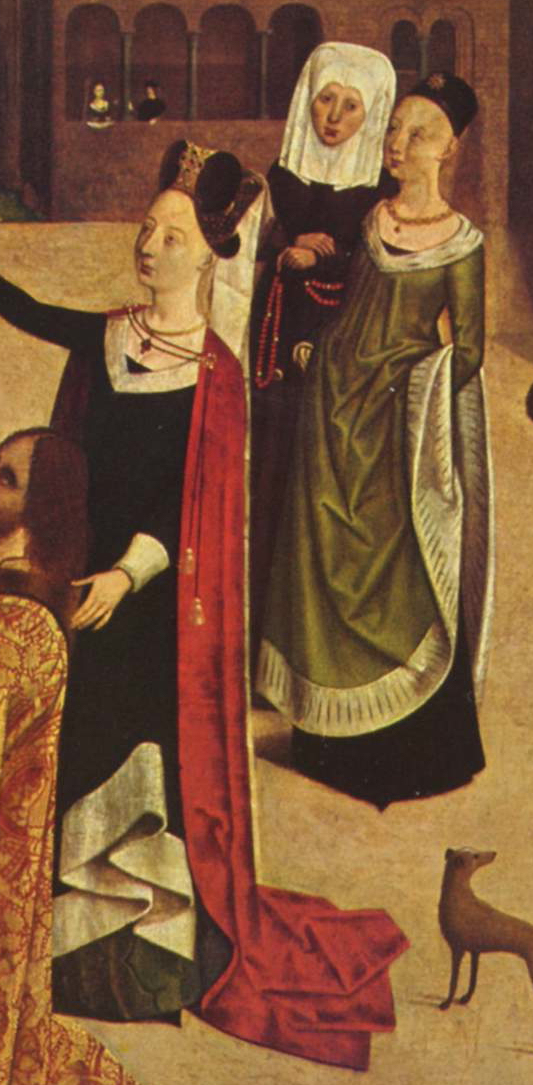
2 – 1480–1485

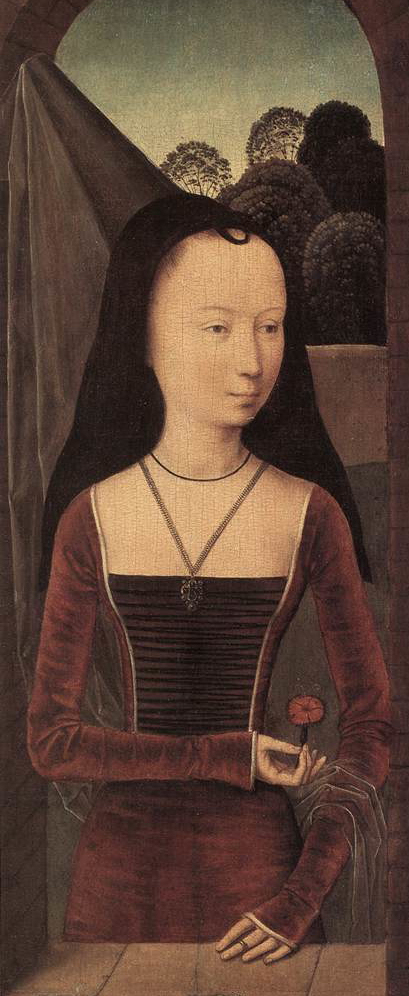
3 – 1485–1490

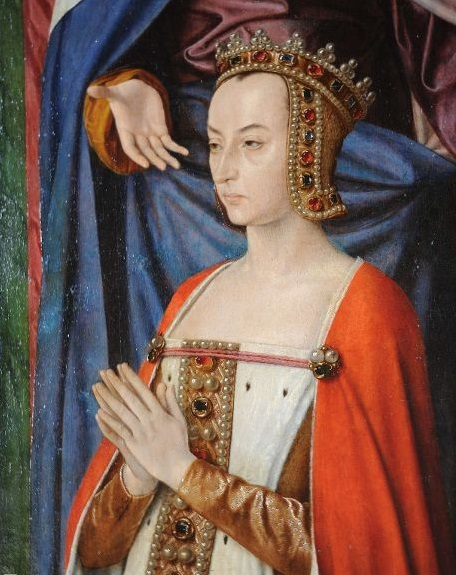
4 – c. 1490s

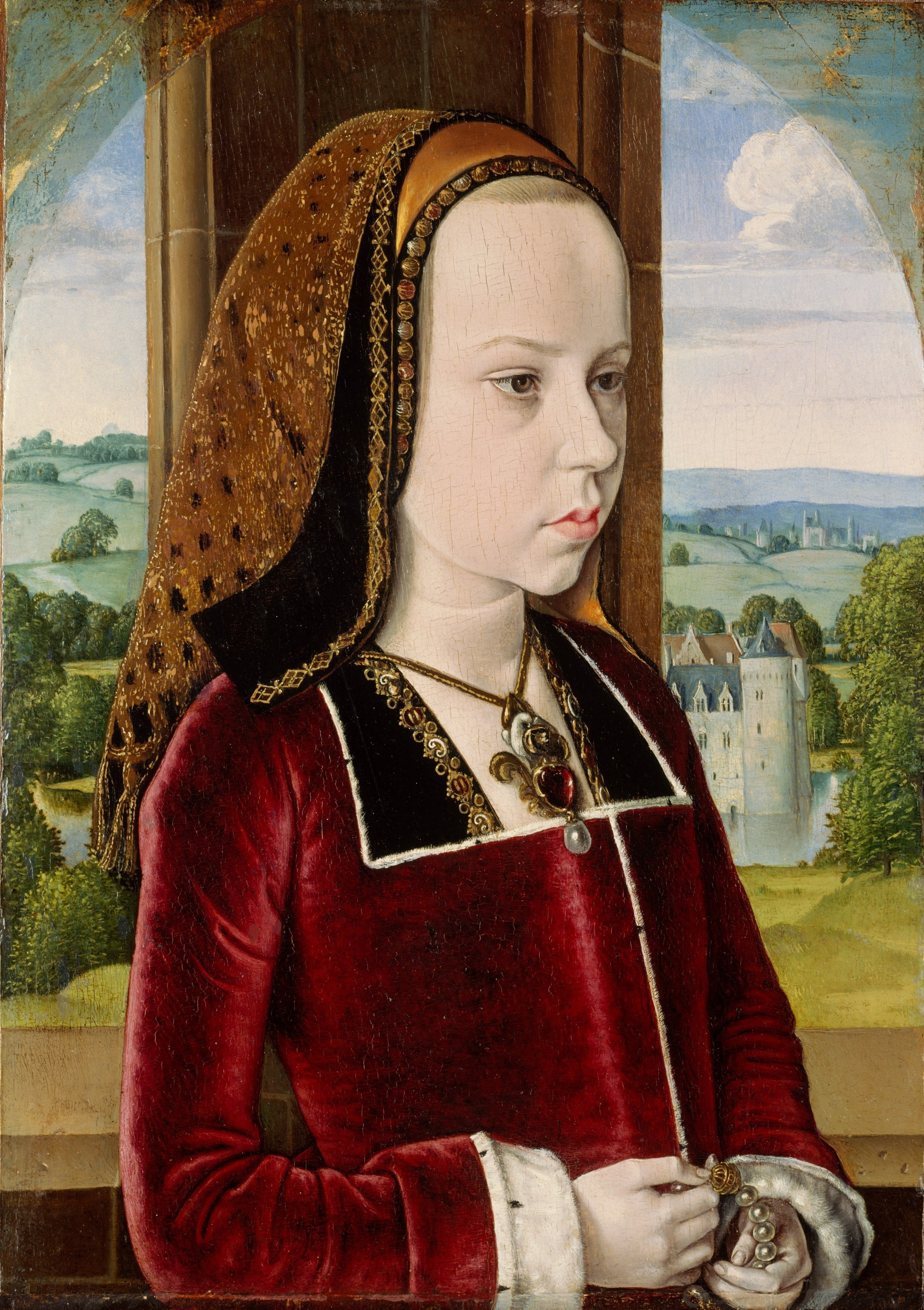
5 – 1490s

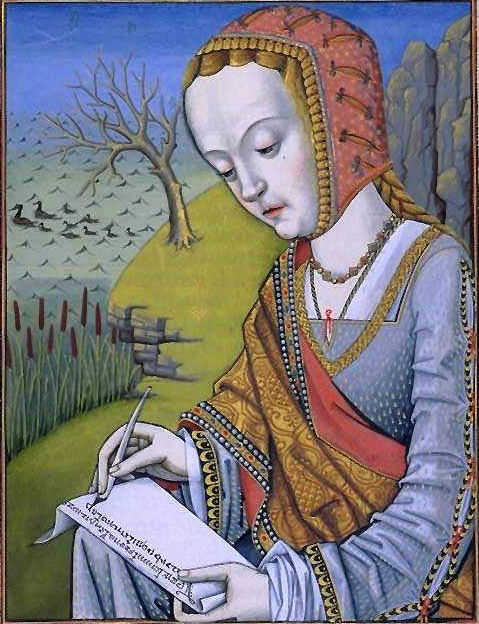
6 – 1496–1498

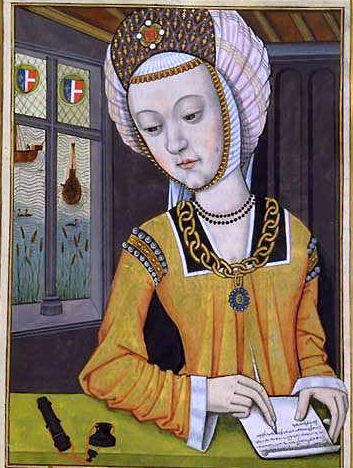
7 – 1496–1498

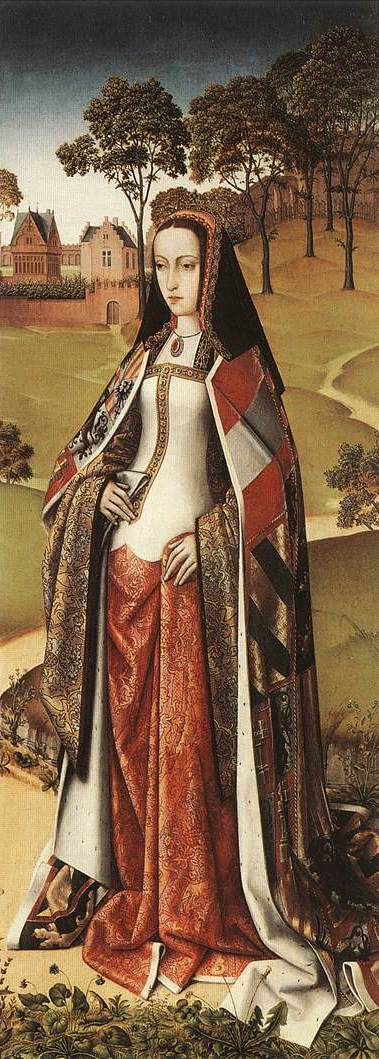
8 – c. 1499

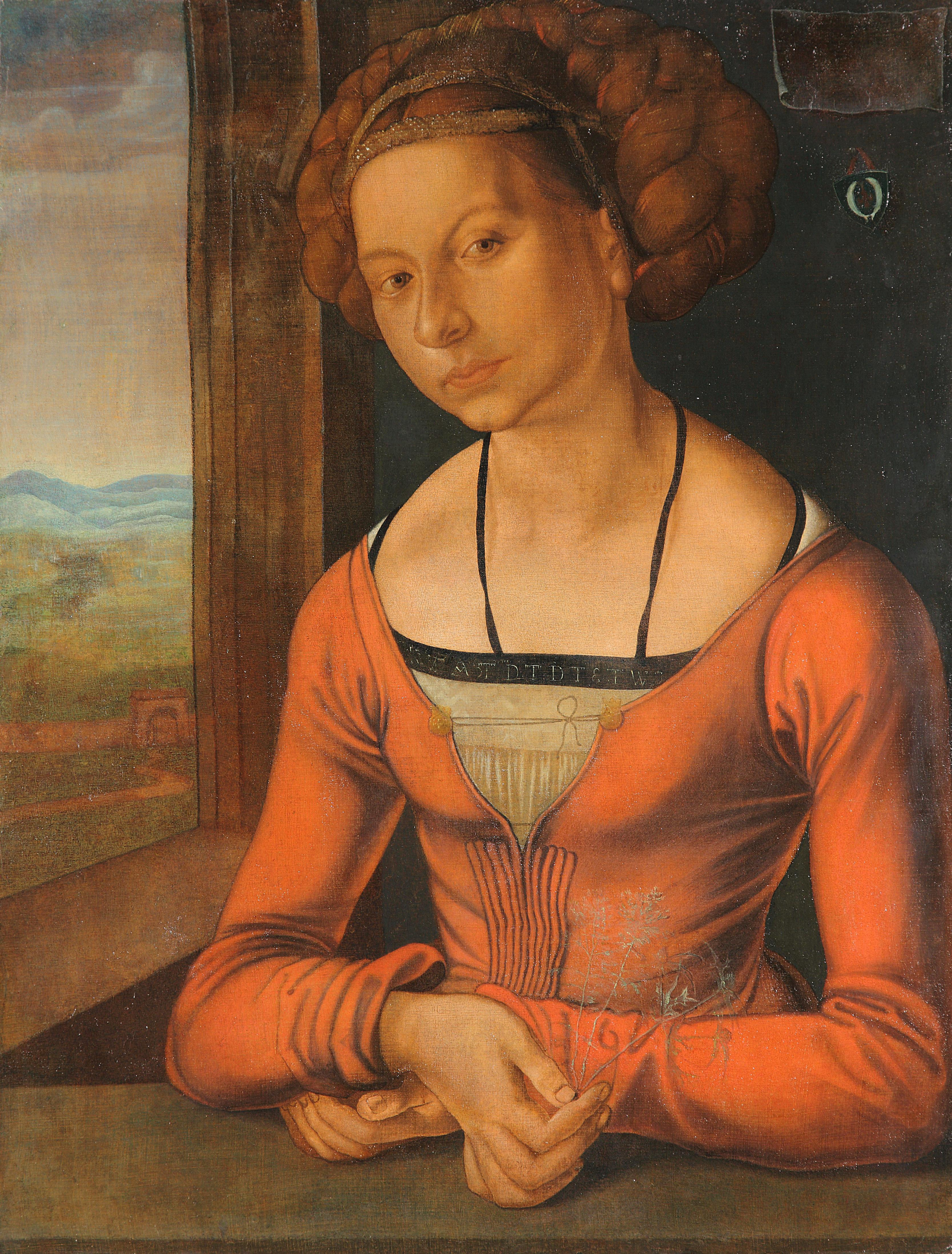
9 – 1497

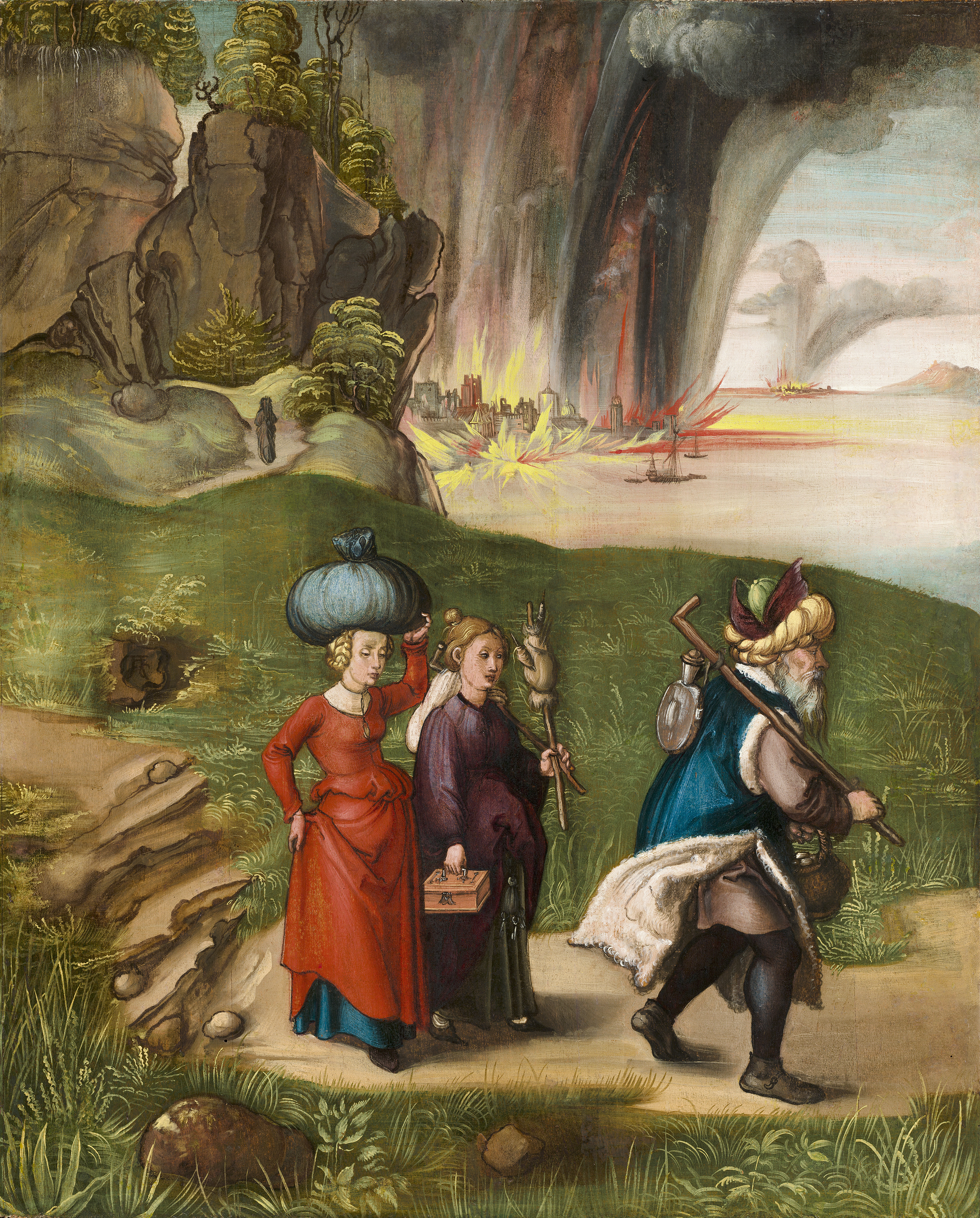
10 – 1496–1499
1. Mary Magdalene is portrayed in the contemporary dress of 1480. The low front opening now laces over the kirtle or an inserted panel or plackard, and the gown is draped up to reveal the richer fabric of the kirtle skirt.
2. Long gowns of the 1480s are carried looped up to allow walking, displaying the kirtle beneath.
3. In this allegory of True Love, the woman wears a pointed hennin with a sheer veil. Her gown is laced across her kirtle, Netherlands, 1485–1490.
4. Anne de Beaujeu, Regent of France, in the ceremonial ermine-trimmed sideless surcoat and mantle of royalty, c. 1490s. The small cap worn with her coronet is a new French fashion of the last decade of the 15th century.
5. Margaret of Austria wears a red velvet front-opening gown lined in ermine. Her hood has black velvet lappets and gold embroidery, 1490s.
6. Hypsipyle, the first wife of Jason, is depicted wearing an embroidered coif or cap decorated with small slashes, with her hair braided down her back underneath. She wears a square-necked dress with flared sleeves, French, 1496–1498.
7. Another fashionable headdress of this period features a striped veil wrapped over an embroidered padded roll with a jewel, worn over a coif tied under the chin. The portion over the brow is probably a matching "forehead cloth" rather than part of the coif. The loose, square-necked gown of figured silk is worn over a black partlet, French, 1496–1498.
8. Joanna of Castile in the royal ermine-trimmed sideless surcoat and a symbolic mantle with heraldic decoration.
9. Woman with an elaborated braided hairstyle, 1497.
10. Women with dresses and underskirts, 1496–1499.

=== Style gallery – Italy 1400s–1460s ===
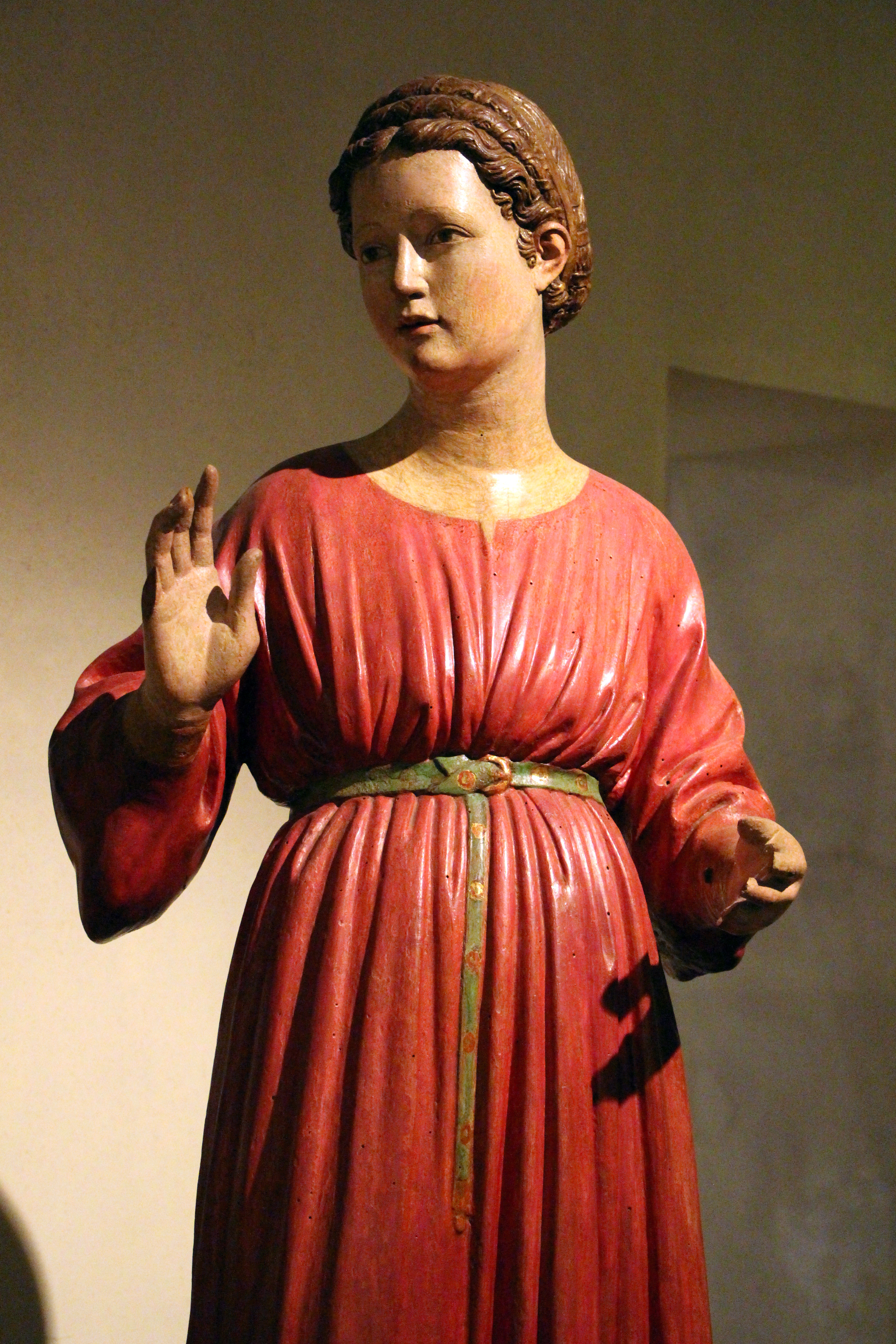
1 – circa 1410

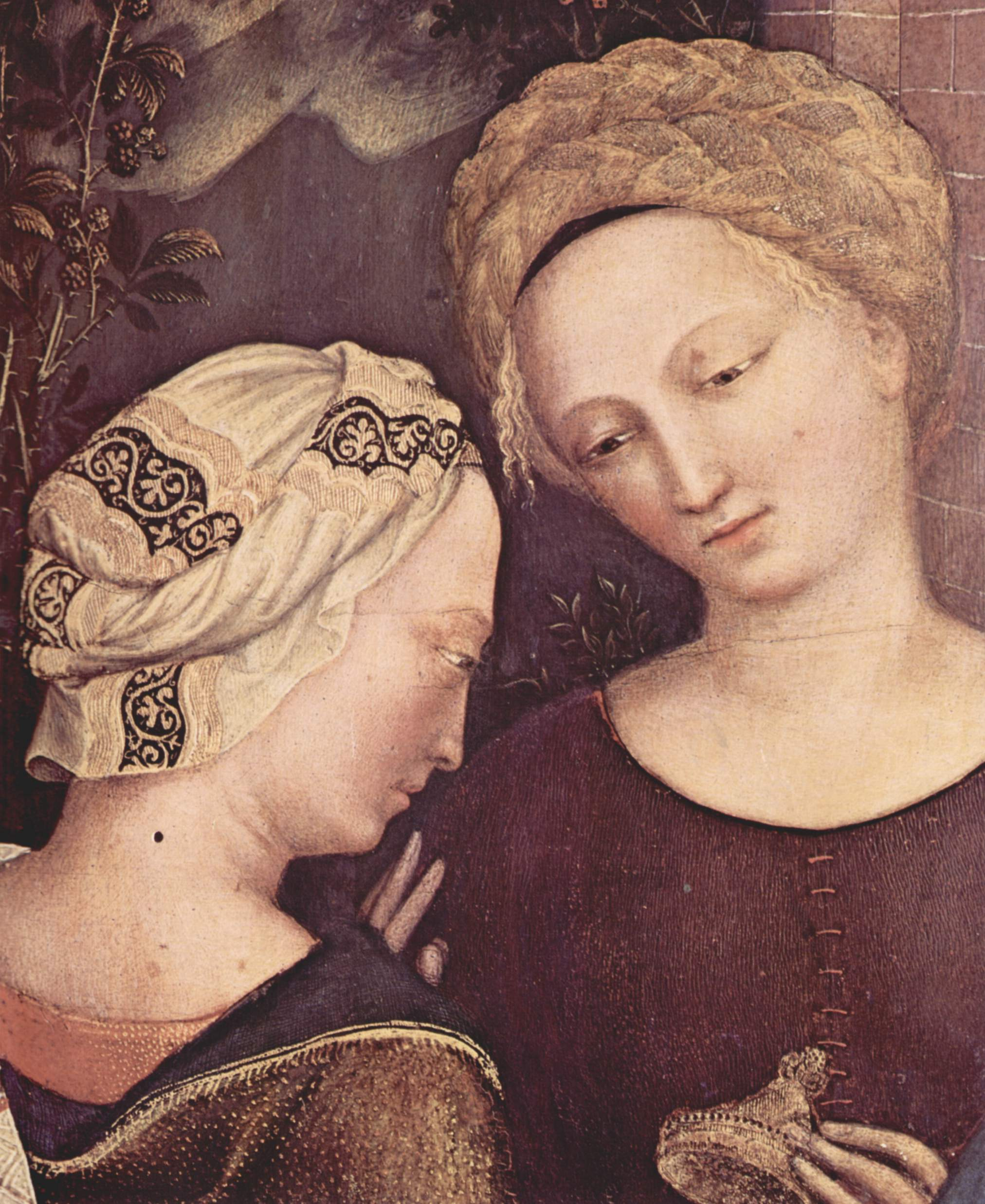
2 – 1423

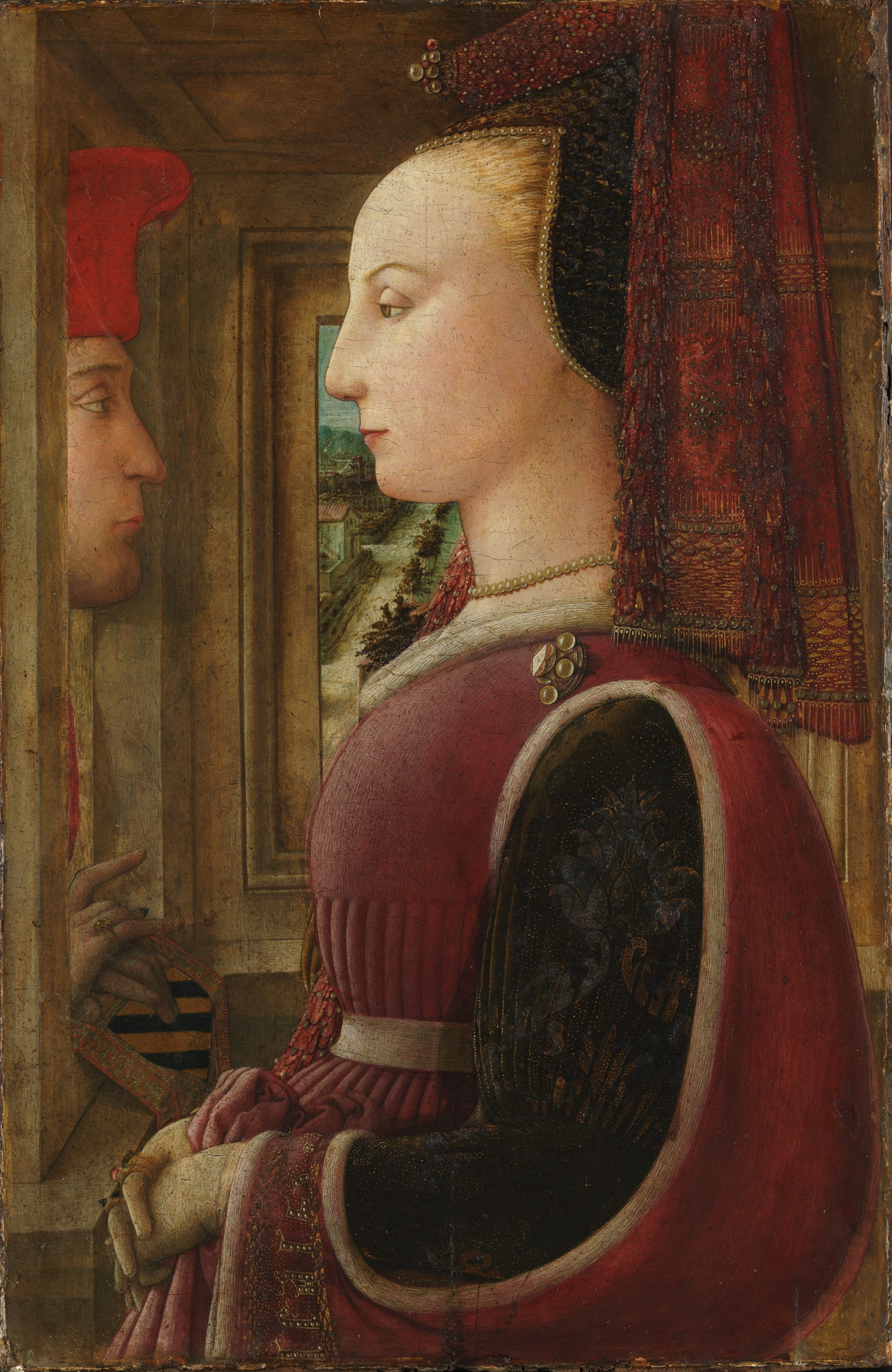
3 – c. 1440

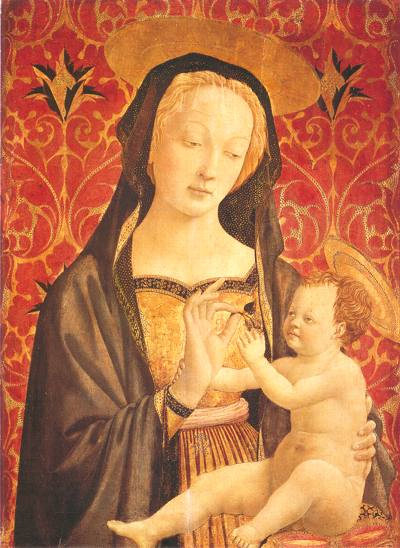
4 – c. circa 1450

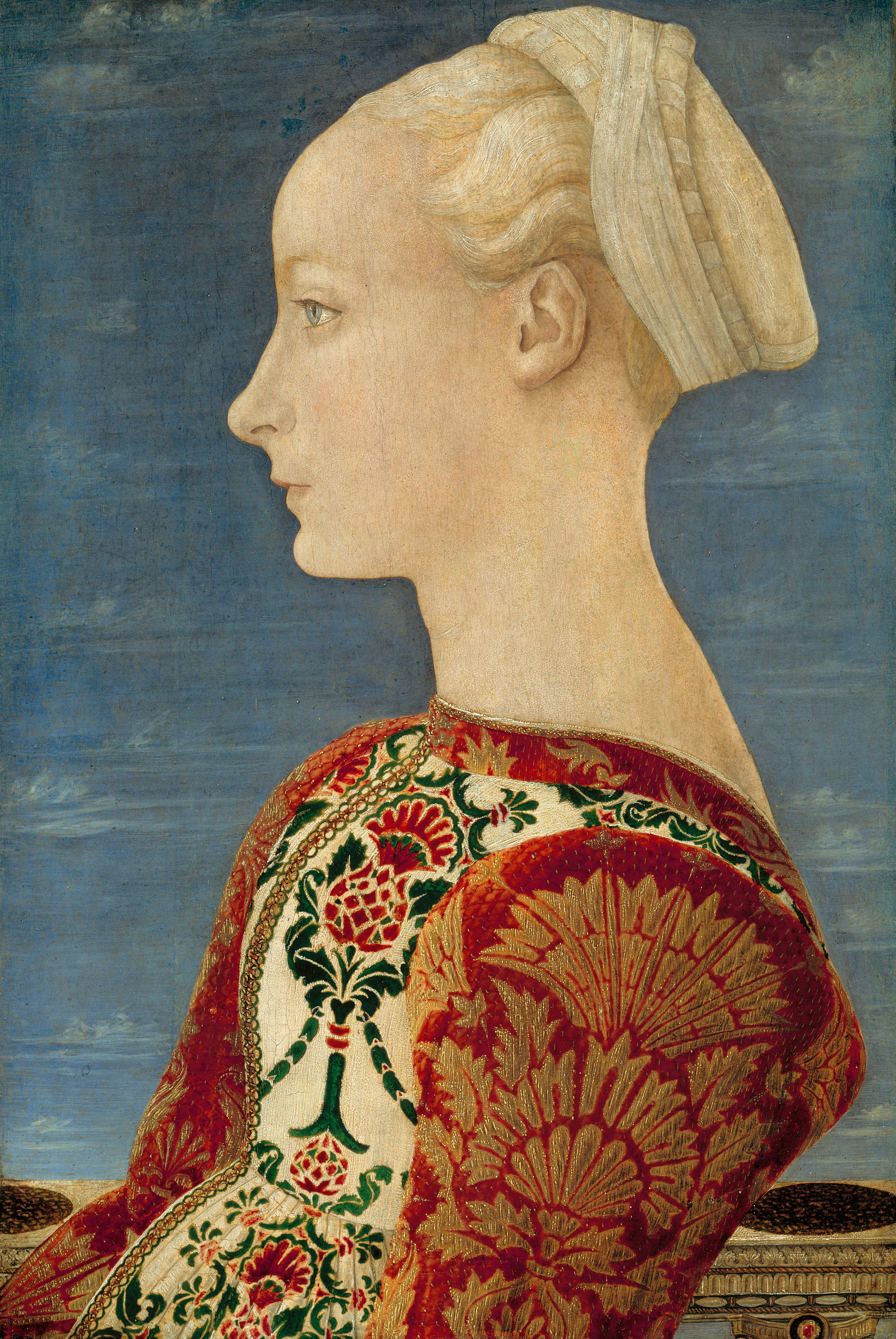
5 – c. 1450

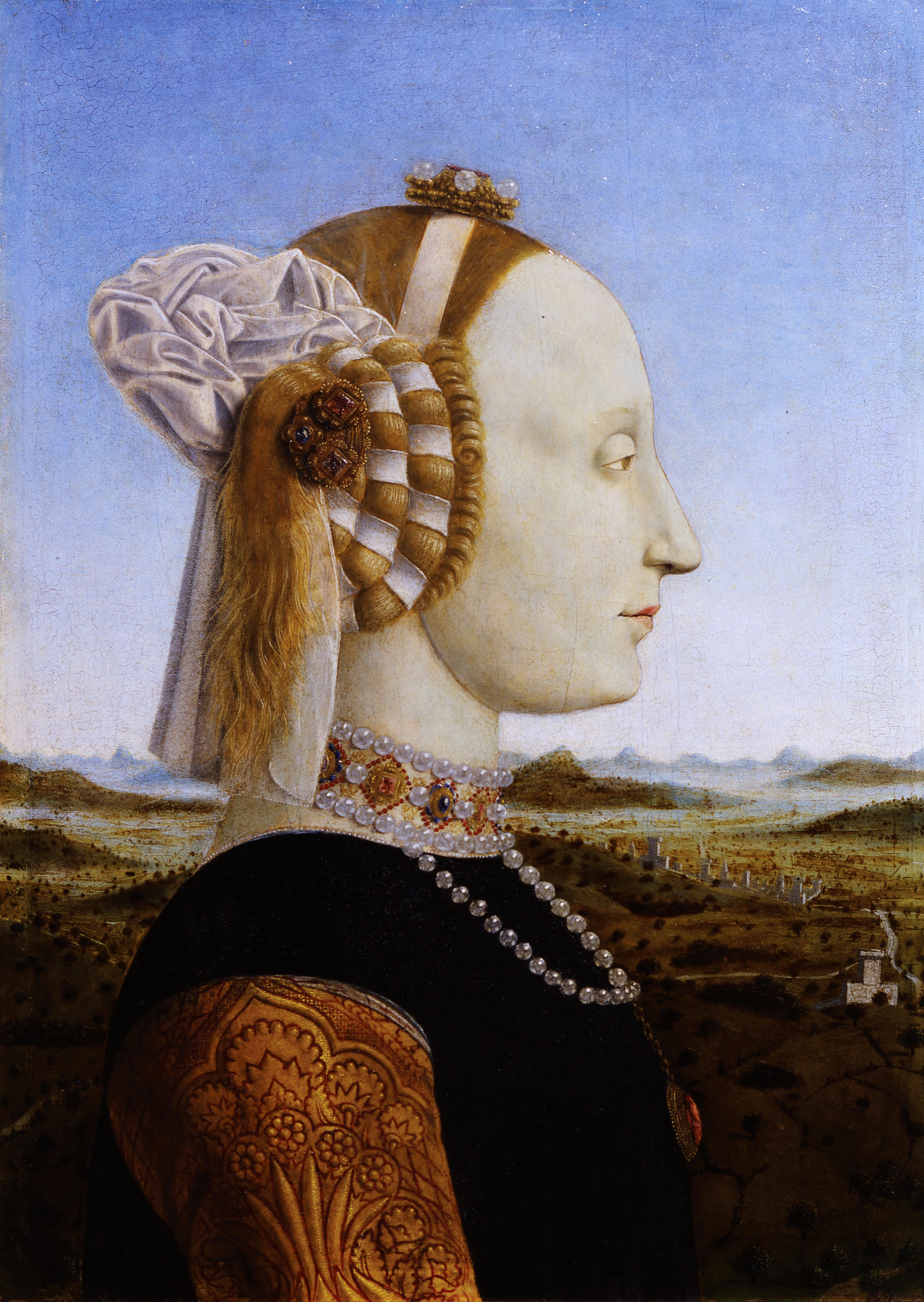
6 – 1465–1470

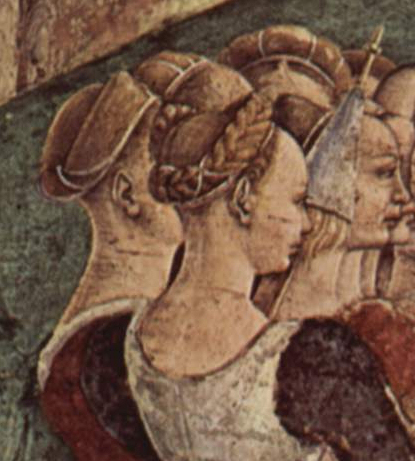
7 – c. 1468–1470
1. Statue of Mary with a simple red gown with a green girdle belt and a braided hairstyle, circa 1410.
2. Detail of the Adoration of the Magi altarpiece by Gentile da Fabriano. The woman on the left wears a veil twisted into a turban. The woman on the right has her hair held in a long, thick braid encased in sheer fabric and twisted around her head. Her simple gown laces up the front with a single lace, 1423.
3. A woman at a casement wears a fur-lined red gown with a belt at the high waistline and full slashed sleeves over dark patterned undersleeves gathered to the elbow. Her headdress features a red chaperon, Florence, c. 1440.
4. Bianca Maria Visconti is depicted in c. 1445 in this portrait as the Virgin Mary with her son Galeazzo as the infant Jesus. She is wearing a high-waisted gown of embroidered gold with tight-fitting sleeves. Her blonde hair is partially covered by a long black veil.
5. Italian sleeveless gown of mid-15th century has an obvious waist seam and a skirt pleated to the bodice. The figured undergown has a high front neckline and wide upper sleeves. Her hair is lightly covered with a cap and veil twisted into a turban.
6. Battista Sforza, Duchess of Urbino wears her hair wrapped in ribbon which is coiled at her ears and covered with a ruched veil. Her black gown is high necked in front and lower at the back, typical of Italian fashion at this time, and is worn with floral sleeves, probably attached to an underdress, 1465–1470.
7. Italian fresco showing women with their hair braided or twisted, and wrapped around their heads, secured with ribbons laced through the coils, 1468–1470.

=== Style gallery – Italy and Spain 1470s–1490s ===
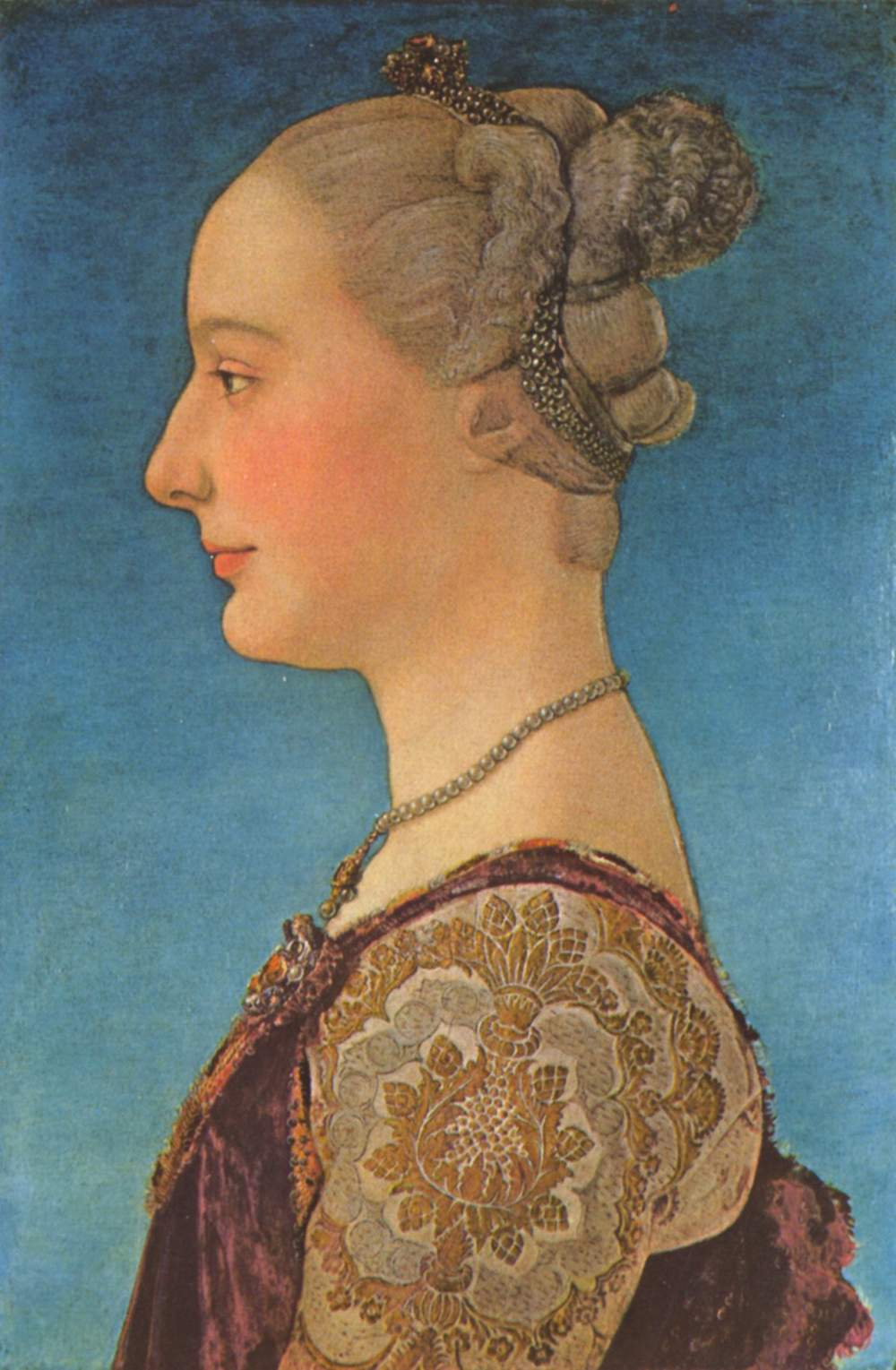
1 – 1470

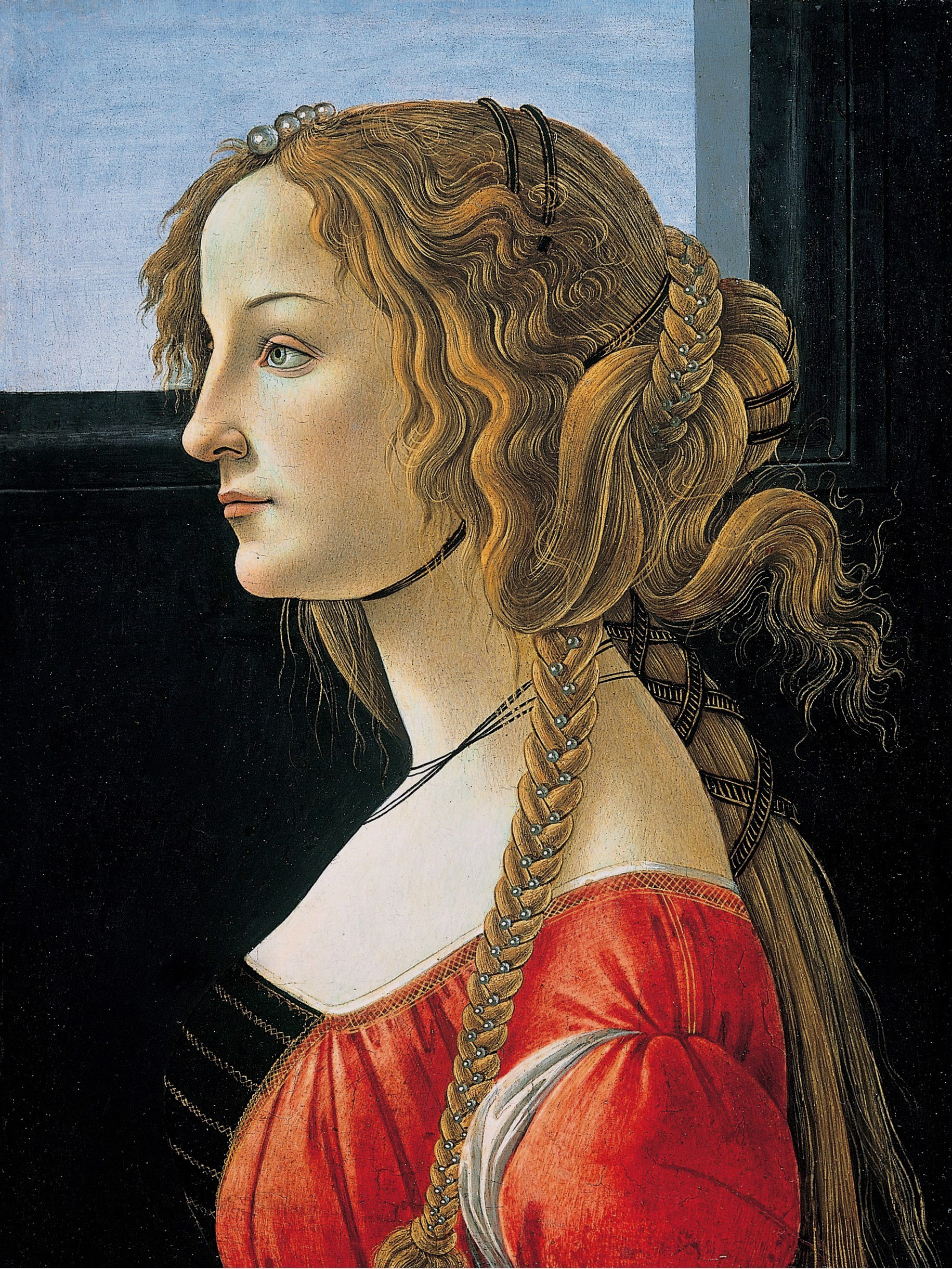
2 – 1476–1480

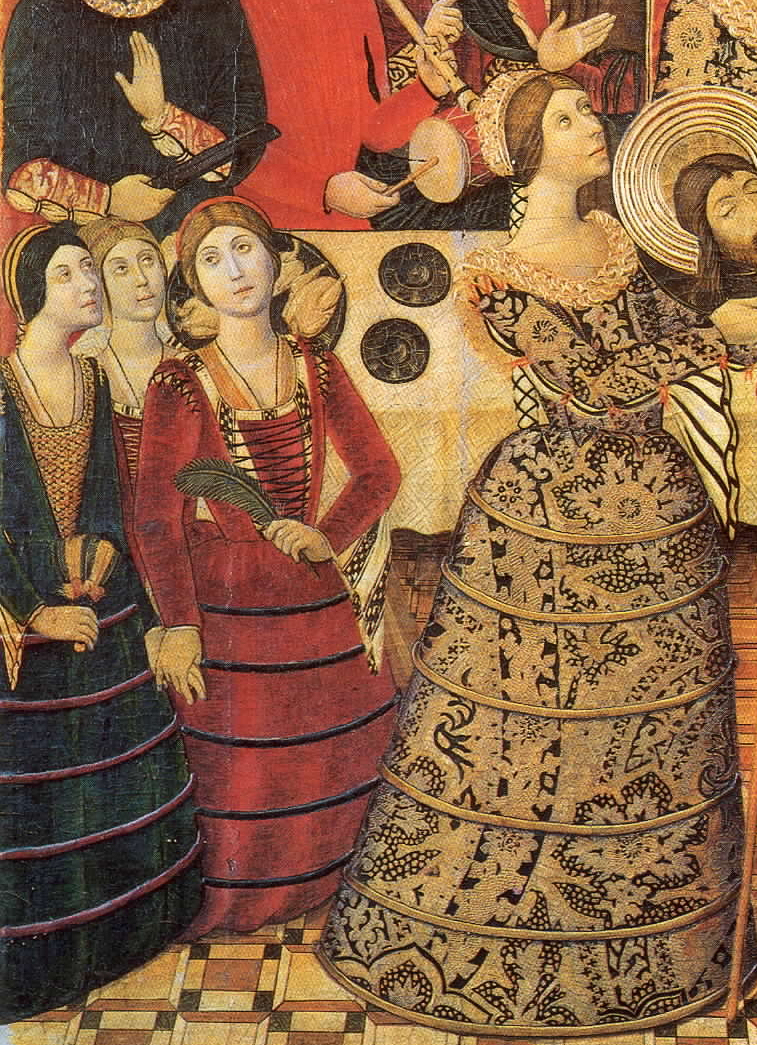
3 – 1470s

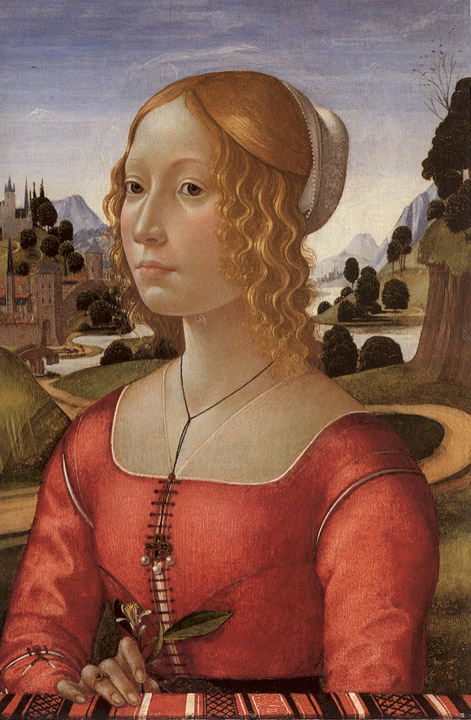
4 – c. 1490

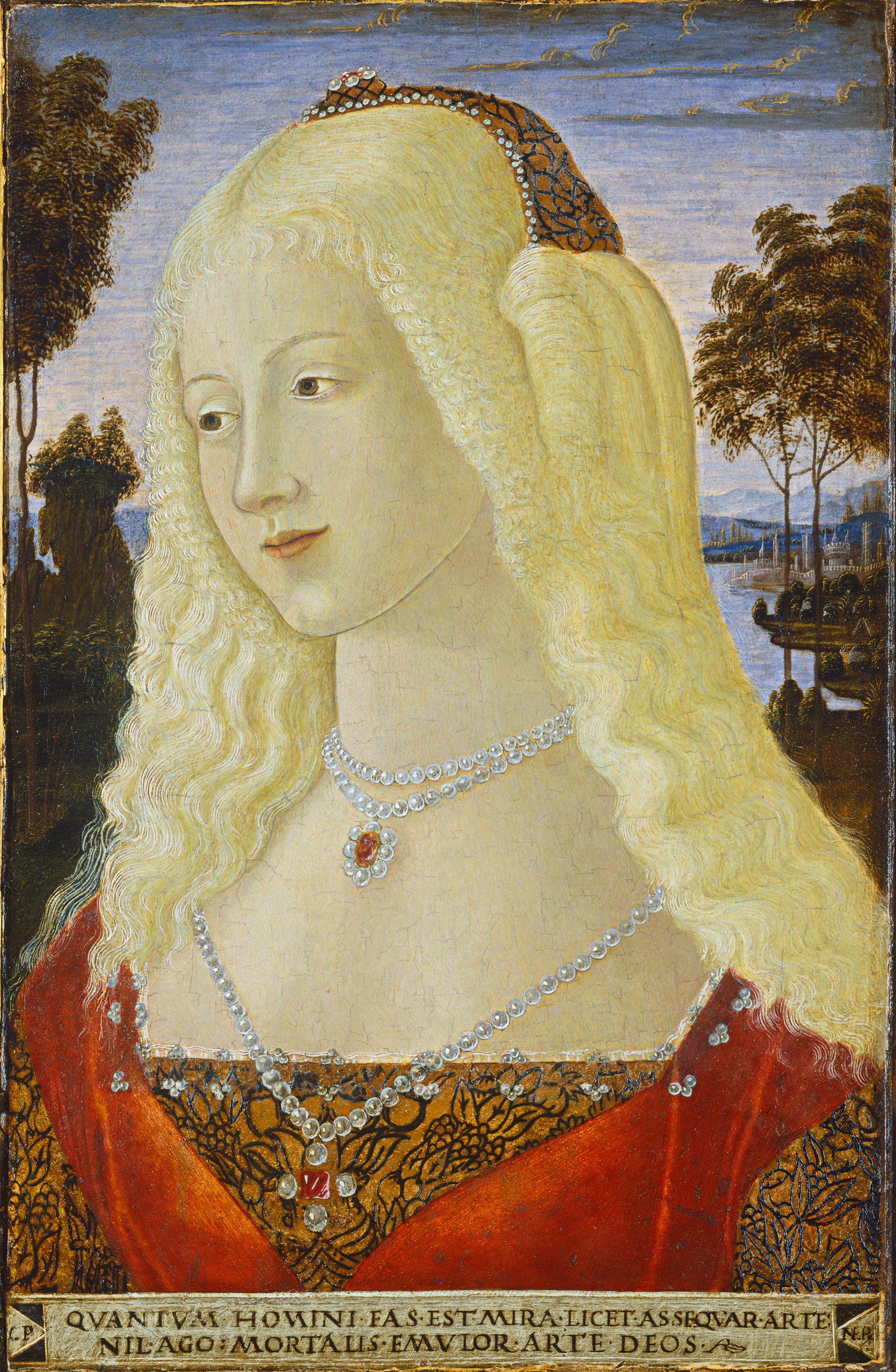
5 – c. 1490

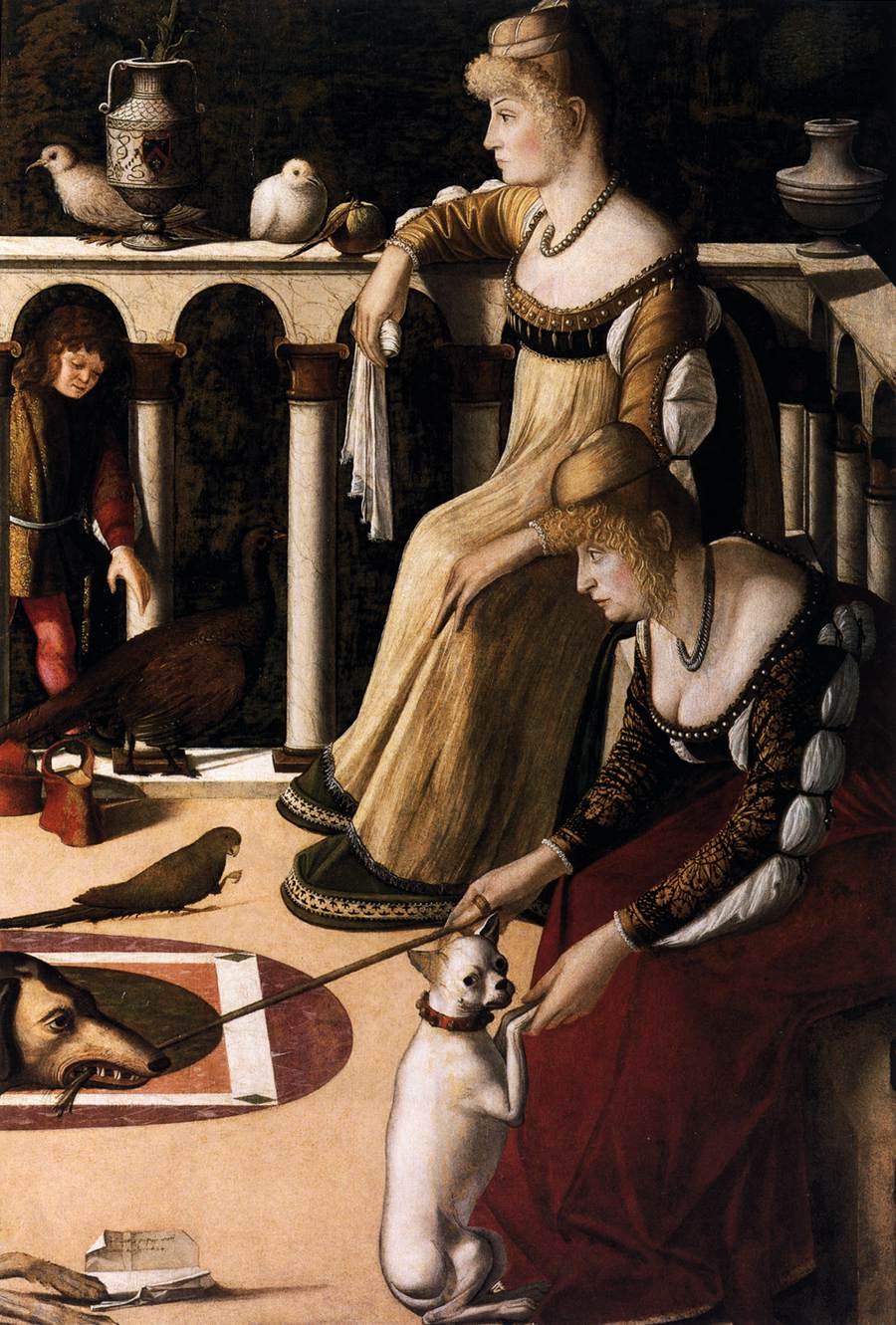
6 – c. 1490

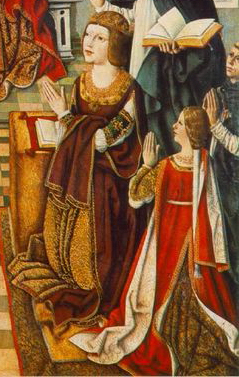
7 – 1490–1495

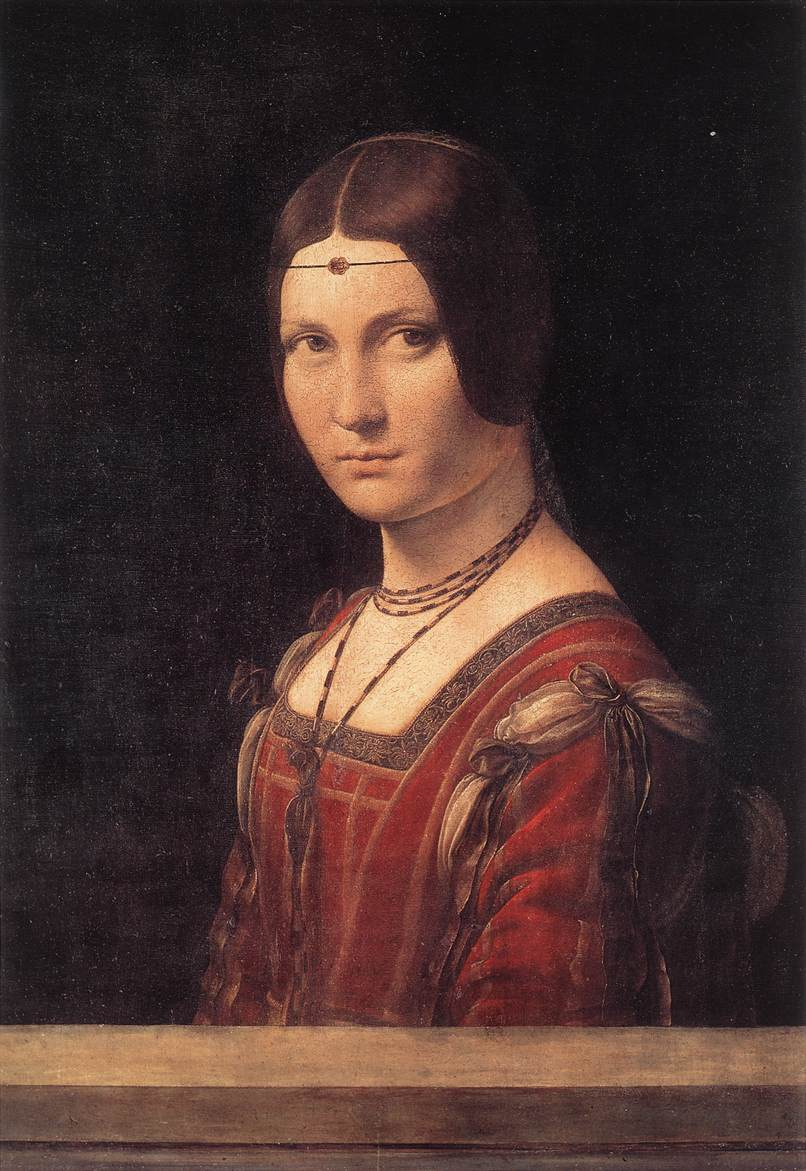
8 – 1490–1496
1. Florentine woman wears sleeves of figured silk with the fashionable pomegranate motif, 1470.
2. Simonetta Vespucci wears her very long hair in a knot at the back with a tail wrapped in black cord or ribbons. A single braid is studded with pearls, and a long loose lock is looped over the braid. Her neckline is lower and squared, 1476–1480.
3. Salome and her attendants are pictured in Catalan dress of the 1470s. This image is one of the earliest depictions of the verdugado or farthingale, a skirt stiffened with reeds set in casings, that would spread to Italy briefly in the 1480s and '90s, and to France and England in the 16th century. The flaring chemise sleeves of striped or embroidered fabric are uniquely Spanish at this time, but the small cap and wrapped braid of hair are common to both Spain and Italy.
4. 1490 portrait of a lady features the sheer pointed partlet worn over the gown that was popular in Italy at this time. This woman wears a small cap with a brim on the back of her head; it ties under her chin.
5. Neroccio di Bartolomeo de' Landi's "Lady" wears a V-necked, high-waisted gown with hanging sleeves over a floral silk gamurra with a square neckline. Her cap is of the same floral silk. Siena, c. 1490.
6. Two Venetian ladies with blonde frizzy hair and caps. The very high waist is typical of Venice. Note the chopines or platform shoes to the left. As with other similar pictures, historians argue as to whether these are patrician ladies or courtesans.
7. Isabella I of Castile in her crown wears a gown with long hanging sleeves over pieced and jewelled undersleeves and a gold brocade kirtle. Her companion (probably her daughter Juana or Joanna) wears undersleeves fastened up the back over full chemise sleeves. Her red gown is open from the waist down in back and has very long hanging sleeves, one of which is looped up over her right shoulder. Her hair is braided and wrapped with a knot or tassel at the end. Spain, 1490–1495.
8. Leonardo da Vinci's La Belle Ferronière wears her long hair smoothed over her ears and pulled back into a braid. Her sleeves are tied to her gown, and the chemise beneath is pulled out in puffs between the ribbon ties. The puffs and the lower waist would be important fashion trends in the next decades.

== Men's fashion ==
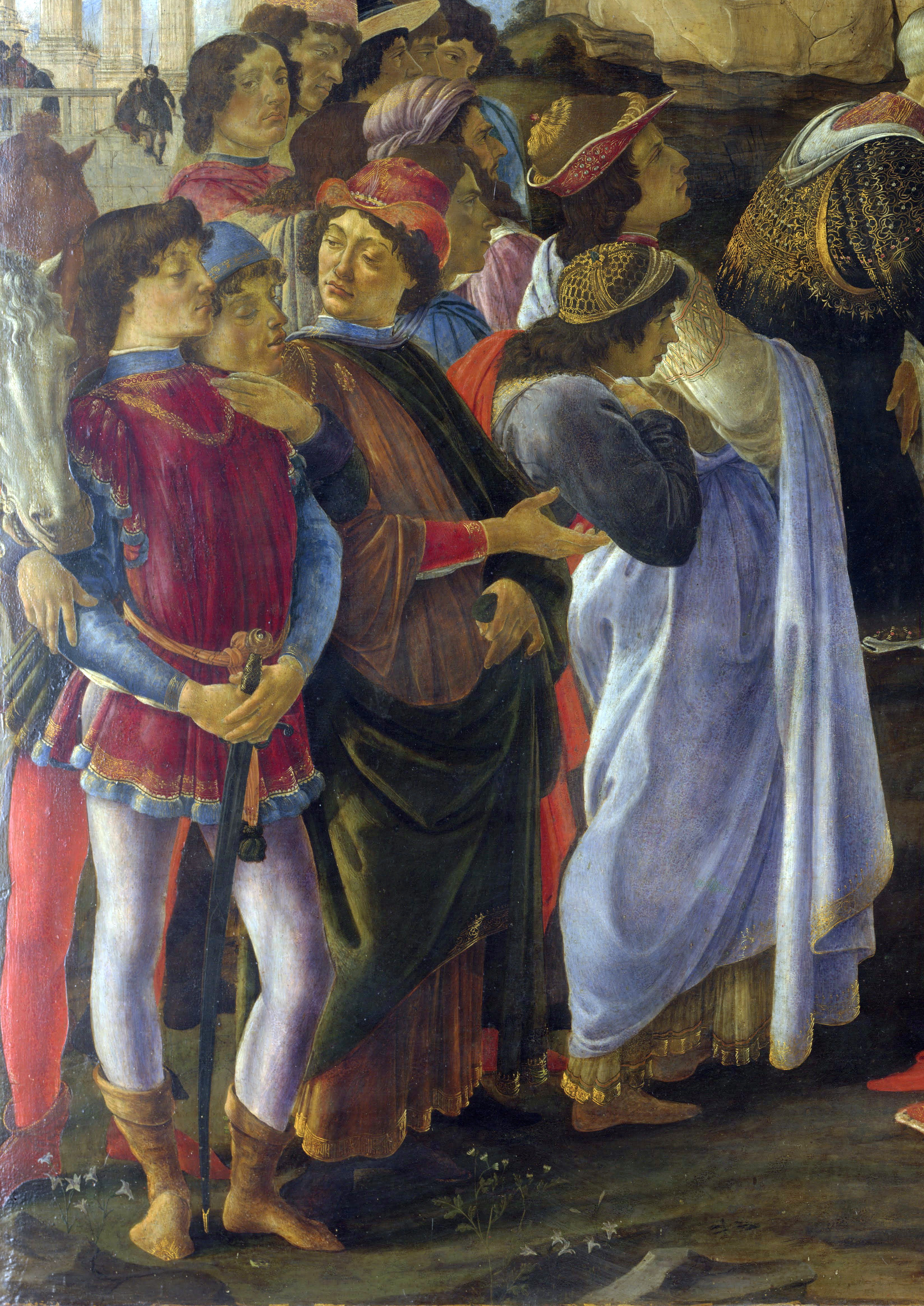
Italian fashion of the 1470s featured short overgowns worn over doublets, and hats of many shapes.

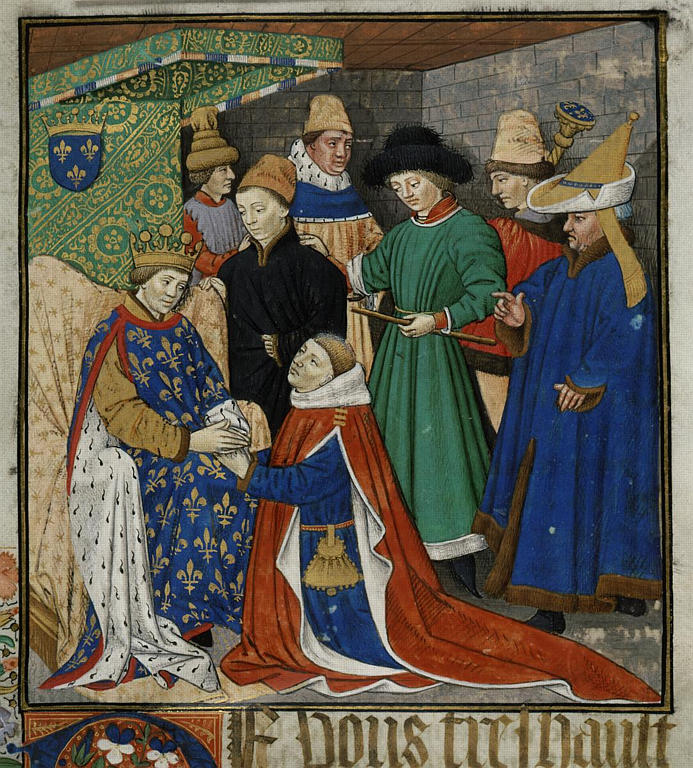
Hats in a variety of styles are also worn by this group of French noblemen in high-collared overgowns lined with fur, c. 1470.

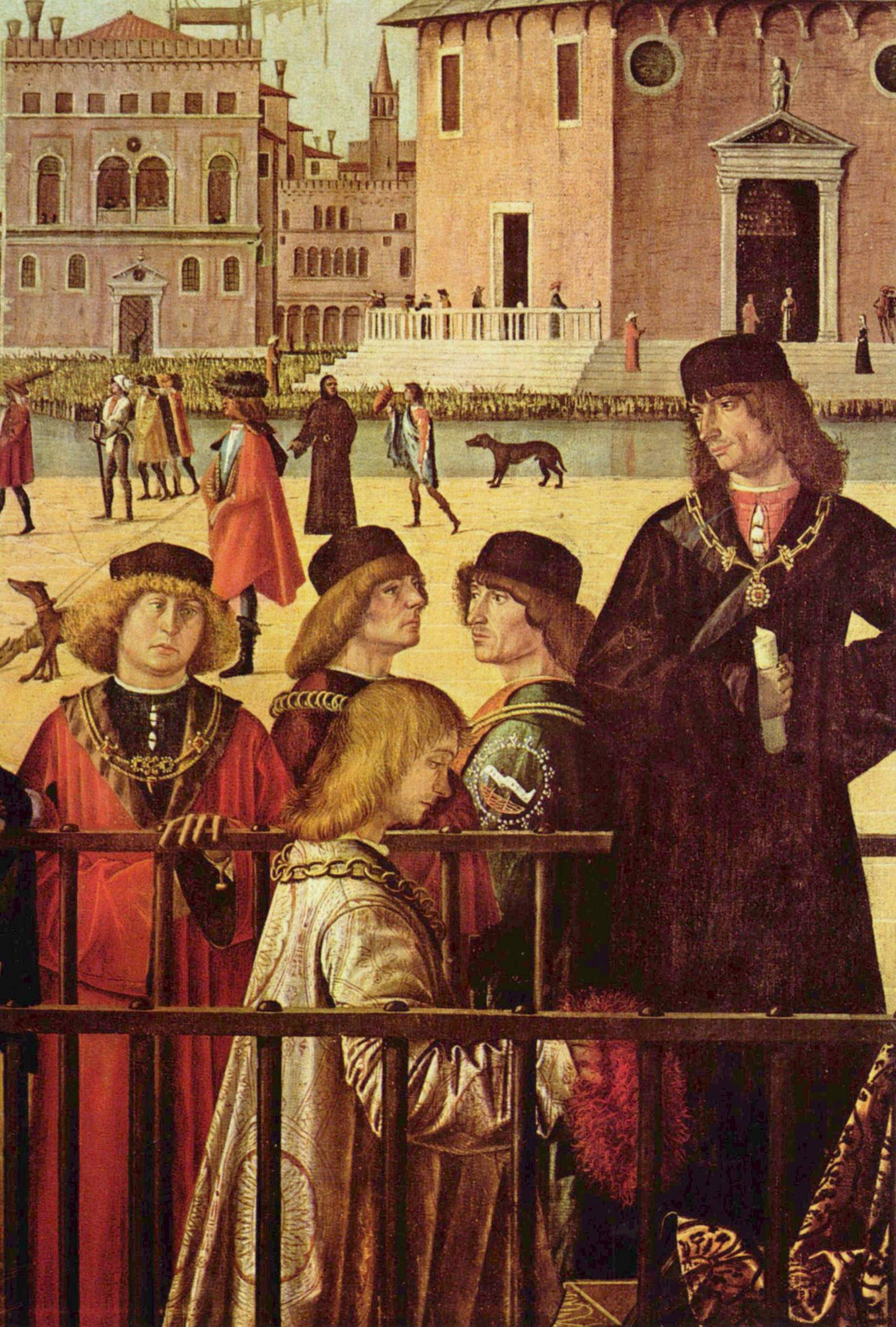
Late in the 15th century, a new style of loose overgown with revers and collar appeared. Italy, 1495.

=== Shirt, doublet, and hose ===
The basic outfit of men in this period consisted of a shirt, doublet, and hose, with some sort of over garment (robe worn over clothing).

Linen shirts were worn next to the skin. Toward the end of the period, shirts (French chemise, Italian camicia, Spanish camisa) began to be full through the body and sleeves with wide, low necklines; the sleeves were pulled through the slashings or piecing of the doublet sleeves to make puffs, especially at the elbow and the back of the arm. As the cut of doublets revealed more fabric, wealthy men's shirts were often decorated with embroidery or applied braid.

Over the shirt was worn a doublet. From around the mid-15th century very tight-fitting doublets, tailored to be tight at the waist, giving in effect a short skirt below, were fashionable. Sleeves were generally full, even puffy, and when worn with a large chaperon, the look was extremely stylish, but very top-heavy. Very form-fitting hose, and long pointed shoes or thigh-boots gave a long attenuated appearance below the waist, and a stout, solid one above. The Houppelande/gown was often elaborately pleated. The pleats being achieved by various means. In Italy both shirt and doublet were often high, tight and collarless at the front of the neck; sometimes they are shown higher at the front than the back.

Men of all classes wore short braies or breeches, a loose undergarment, usually made of linen, which was held up by a belt. Hose or chausses made out of wool were used to cover the legs, and were generally brightly colored. Early hose sometimes had leather soles and were worn without shoes or boots. Hose were generally tied to the breech belt, or to the breeches themselves, or to a doublet.

As overgarments became shorter, hose reached to the waist rather than the hips, and were sewn together into a single garment with a pouch or flap to cover the front opening; this evolved into the codpiece which only begins being exposed formally after the 1480s in art.

The hose exposed by short tops were, especially in Italy late in the 15th century, often strikingly patterned, parti-coloured (different colours for each leg, or vertically divided), or embroidered. Hose were cut on the cross-grain or bias for stretch.

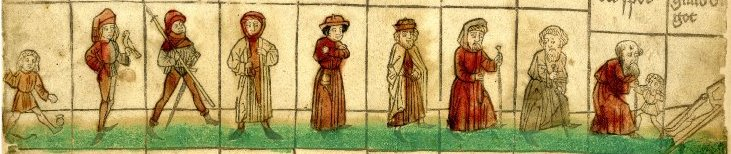
The Ages of Man, German, 1482. Only the younger adult men wear short doublets showing off their legs.

=== Over-robes and outerwear ===
The Houppelande, in Italy called the cioppa, was the characteristic overgarment of the wealthy in the first half of the 15th century. It was essentially a robe with fullness falling from the shoulders in organ-pipe pleats and very full sleeves often reaching to the floor with, in the beginning of the 15th century then at the start of the 16th century, a high collar. The houppelande could be lined in fur, and the hem and sleeves might be dagged or cut into scallops. It was initially often worn belted. The length of the garment shortened from around the ankle to above the knee over this period. The floor-length sleeves were later wrist-length but very full, forming a bag or sack sleeve, or were worn off the arm, hanging ornamentally behind. This style of sleeve appeared towards the 1430s and it is at this time, that in French, the term "houppelande" gets replaced by the word "robe" or gown. A side-less and sleeveless houppelande, called a giornea in Italy and a journade in France, was popular. It was usually pleated and was worn hanging loose or belted. Young men wore them short and older men wore them calf- or ankle-length.

These houppelandes, giorneas and gowns were pleated thanks to different techniques but the most common ones were using a fabric ring and fastening the gown to it in a way that pleated the garment and adding a layer of interlining (either densely woven linen or low-quality fulled wool) which would have been pleated as any other garment. The outer fabric and lining would have been sewn over this inter-lining in order to take the pleat's shape but without a visible seam line.

The middle of the 15th century in Burgundy saw what seems to have been the earliest occurrence of the male fashion for dressing all in black, which was to reappear so strongly in the "Spanish" style of the mid-16th–17th century and again in the 19th–20th centuries. This was apparently begun by Duke Philip the Good and his court. There are records of him buying black gowns for his retainers. Colour-fast black dyes were especially expensive, so wearing black was a statement of wealth. In Venice, the patrician class, after the age of joining the Great Council, wore their long red robes as a uniform virtually unchanged throughout the 15th century. In contrast, the young men and the famous courtesans of the city dressed very extravagantly. In Florence, men's clothing was relatively sombre in colour, as contemporaries appreciated the expense of a fine grade of cloth over rich dyes, many of which were prohibited by sumptuary laws.

In the last decades of the 15th century, a new style of gown appeared; this was of various lengths, generally worn unbelted, and featured wide turned back revers and collar.

Short or long cloaks or mantles were worn overall for ceremonial occasions and in bad weather; these typically fastened on one shoulder.

=== Headgear ===
Early in the 15th century, the hood remained a common component of dress for all classes, although it was frequently worn around the neck as a cowl or twisted into the fantastical shapes of the chaperon. Felt hats of various styles—tall-crowned with small brims or no brims at all, hats with brims turned up on one side for variations of the coif, or low-crowned with wider brims pulled to a point in front—began to compete with the draped chaperon, especially in Italy and after the 1460s in France/Flanders. A brimless scarlet cap became nearly universal for young Florentines in particular, and was widely worn by older men and those in other cities.

In mid-15th century, a bowl haircut with the hair shaved at the back of the neck was stylish. In Germany, and briefly in Venice, a wide shock of frizzy blond hair was often seen on images of lovers (and angels) in the later part of the 15th century—less often in portraits. By the end of the 15th century, shoulder-length hair became fashionable, a trend that would continue into the early 16th century.

=== Footwear ===
The "Polish" fashion of long-toed poulaines, pikes, or crakows in the previous century continued, prompting sumptuary taxes, regulations, ecclesiastical censure for vanity, and even—in France—outright bans. Outer pattens and the sabatons of the period's armor followed suit, reaching such awkward extremes in the second half of the century that they fell entirely out of fashion in favor of the duckbill shoe supposedly prompted by the extra toe of France's Charles VIII.

=== Style gallery 1400–1450 ===
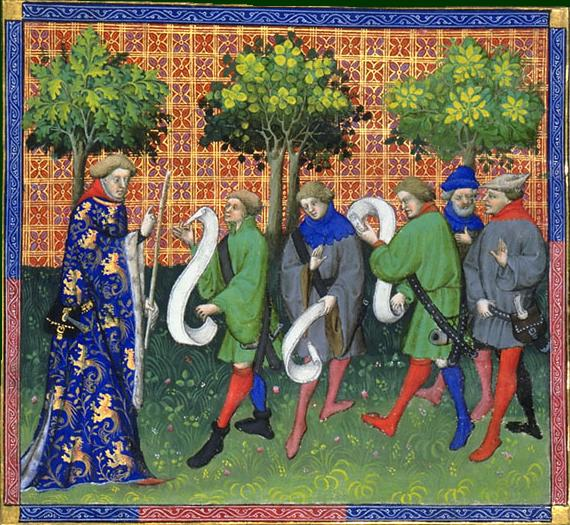
1 – 1405–1410

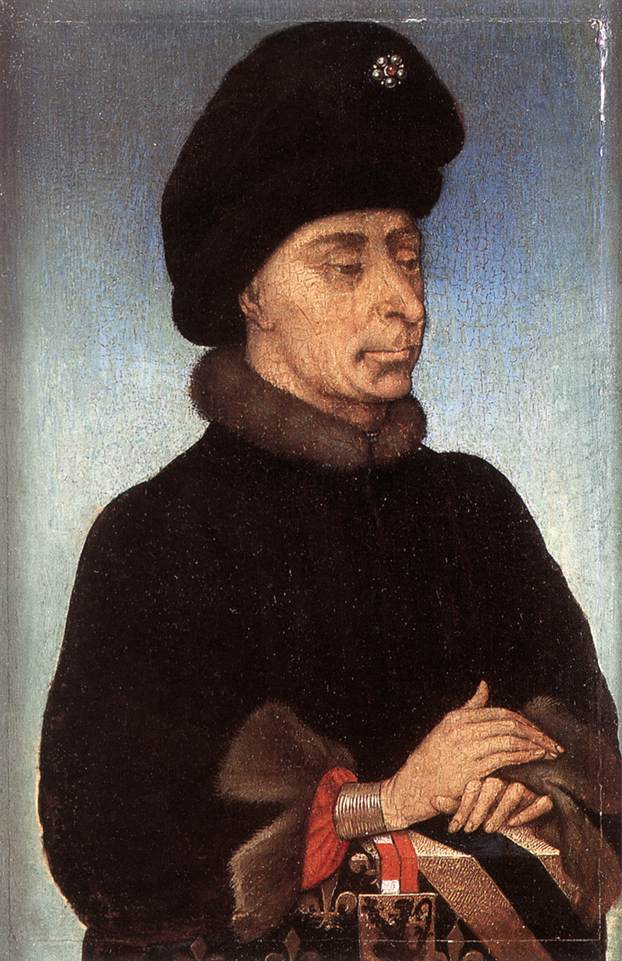
2 – 1400–1419

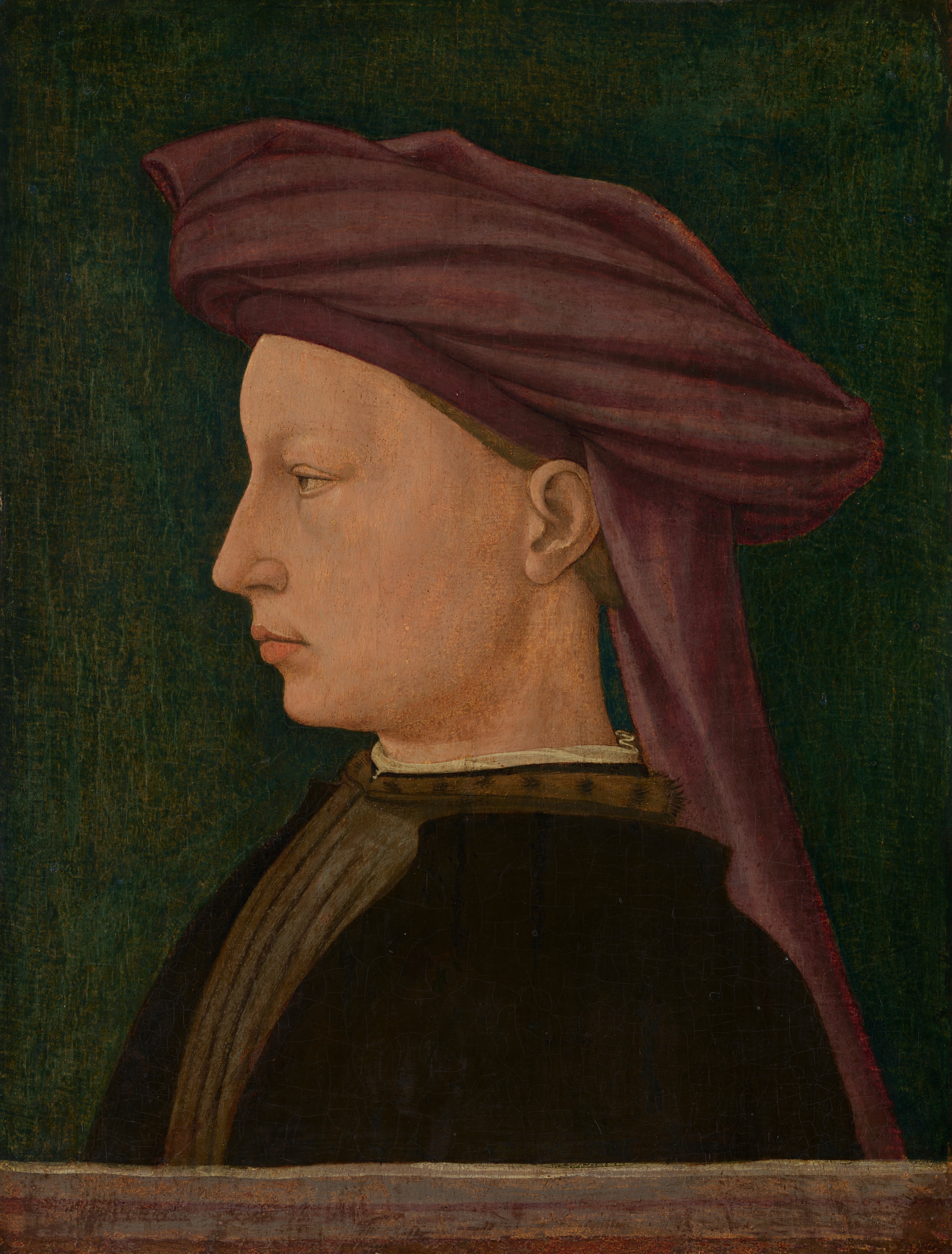
3 – c. 1425

4 – 1433

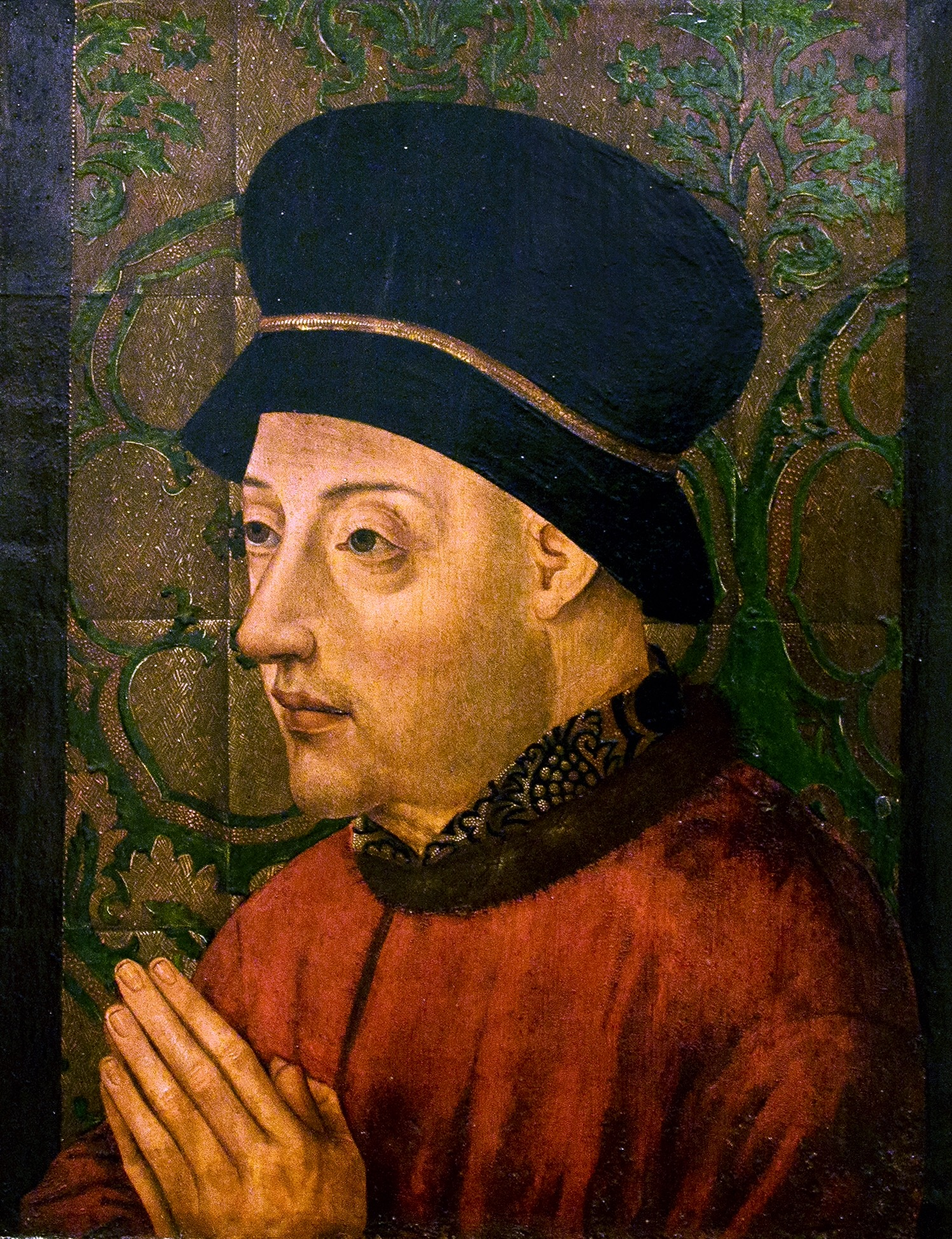
5 – c. 1435

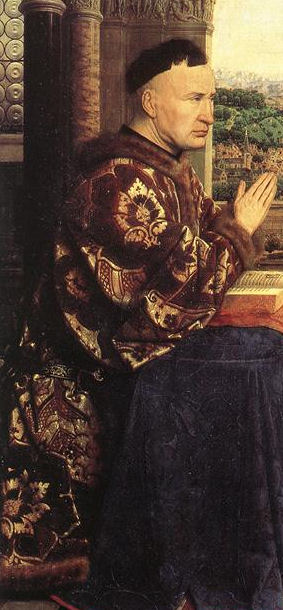
6 – c. 1435

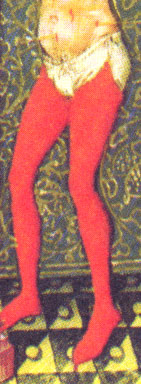
7 – 1440

8 – 1442

9 – 1447–1448
1. The lord on the left wears a long figured houppelande with full sleeves lined in fur, while the men of his household wear short solid-coloured houppelandes with parti-coloured or matching hose. Several of the men wear hoods around their necks, and some wear hats. France, Livre de Chasse, 1405–1410.
2. John the Fearless (d. 1419), Duke of Burgundy and father of Philip the Good, wears a fur-lined black houppelande with high neck and dagged sleeves over a red doublet. His bag-shaped hat has a rolled brim and is decorated with a jewel. Early 15th century.
3. Young man wears a draped chaperon and a dark robe over a reddish doublet. Note the characteristic high front neckline compared to the back neckline, Florence, 1425.
4. A chaperon worn in elaborate twists, 1433.
5. John I of Portugal (d. 1433) wears a red fur-lined houppelande over a patterned doublet and a black bonnet.
6. Nicolas Rolin wears a bold floral patterned robe with fur trim and bag sleeves. The "bowl" haircut with the back of the neck shaved was popular in mid-15th century.
7. Hose or chausses worn with braies and tied to a belt, 1440.
8. Back view of a knee-length Italian cioppa or houppelande of figured silk. One sleeve is turned back to the shoulder to reveal the lining and the doublet sleeve beneath. Siena, 1442.
9. Philip the Good, Duke of Burgundy, wears an elaborately draped chaperon with a black-on-black figured silk short robe with width at the shoulder, 1447–1448.

=== Style gallery 1450–1500 ===
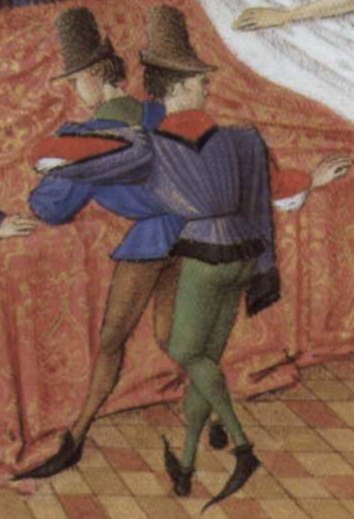
1 – 1460s

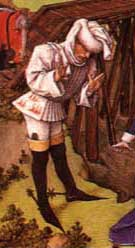
2 – late 1460s

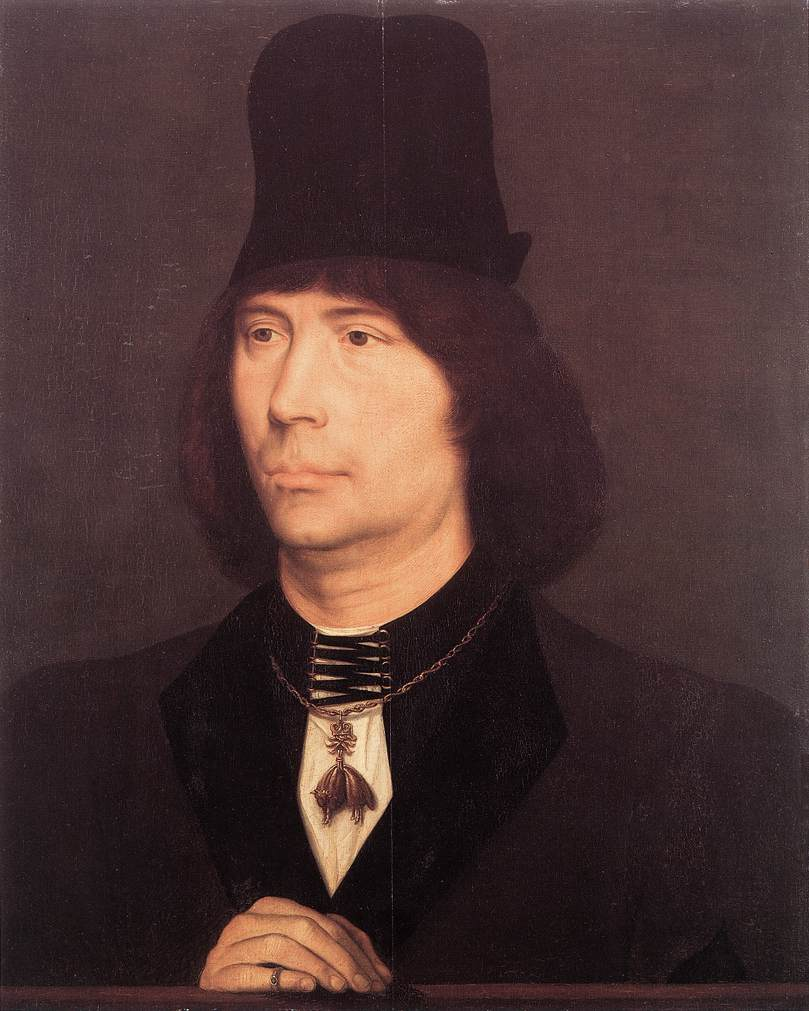
3 – 1467–1470

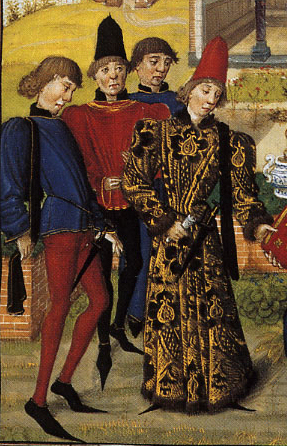
4 – 1468–1470

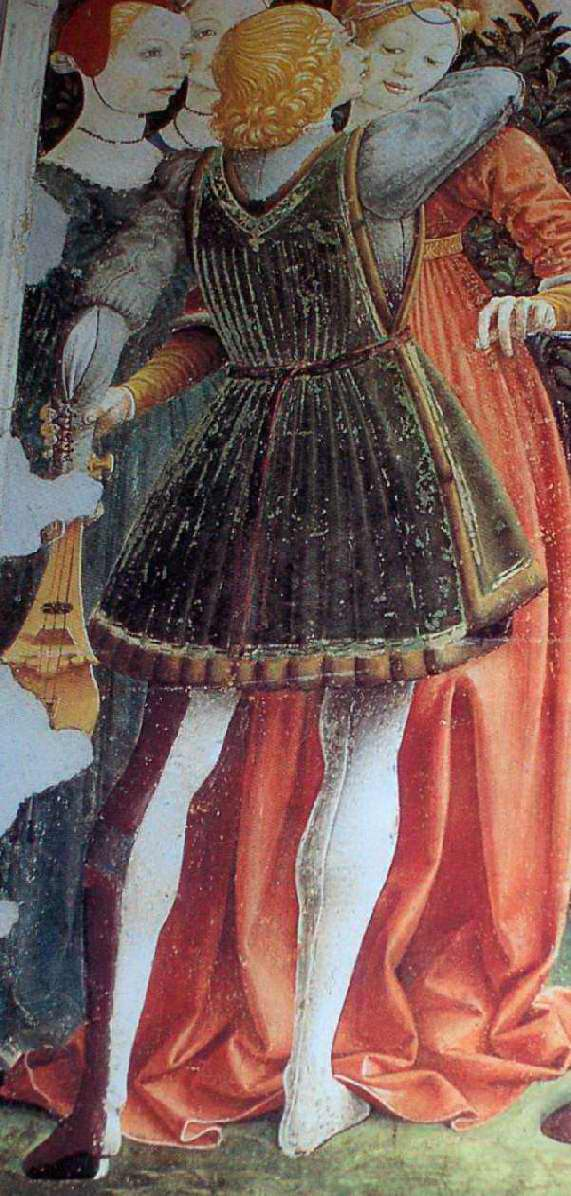
5 – c. 1470

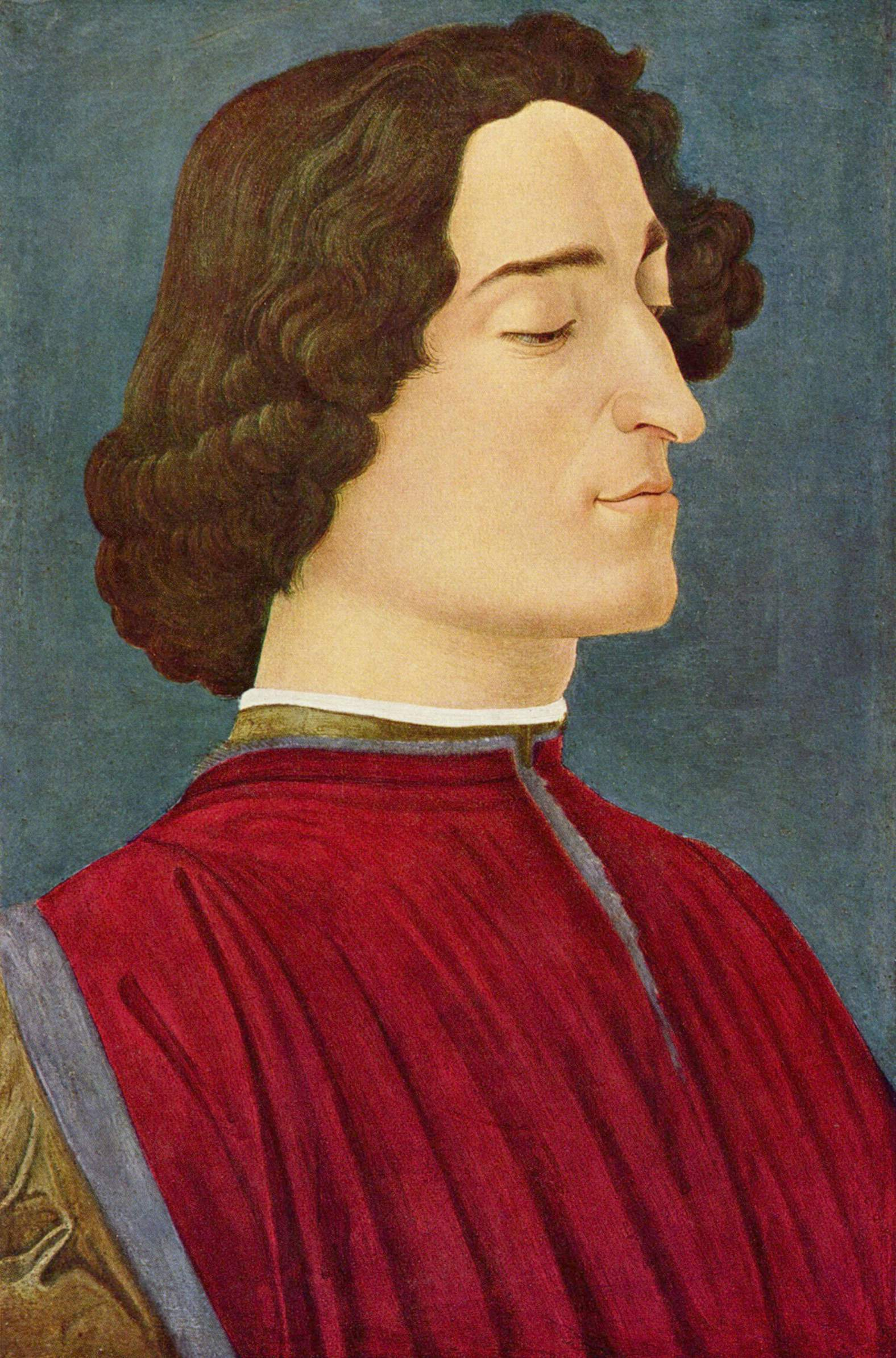
6 – 1478

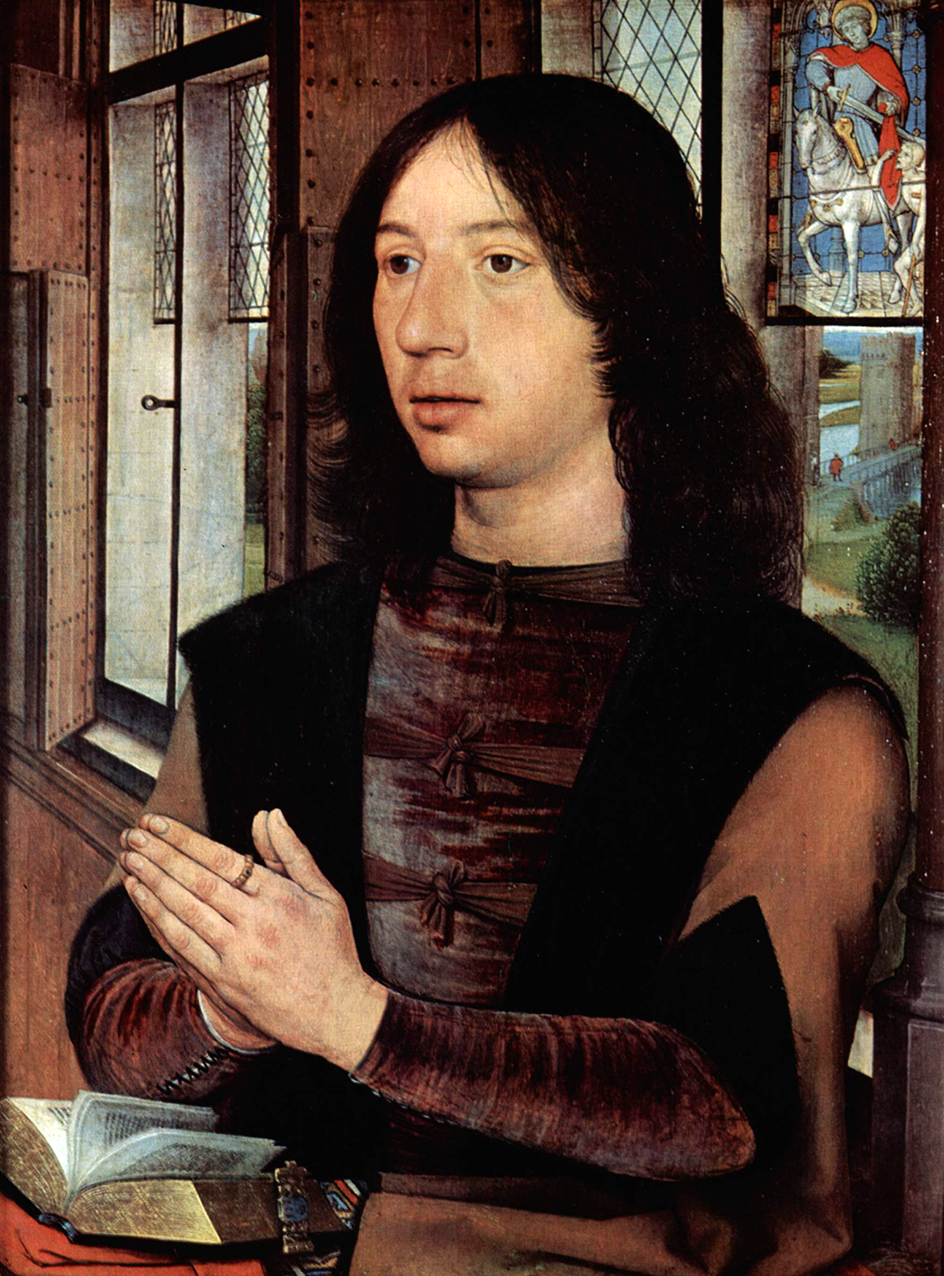
7 – 1487

8 – 1498
1. Back view of the conjoined hose of the 15th century. The man on the right has slashed undersleeves. Note V-shaped back neckline, 1460s.
2. France, late 1460s Short gown, heavily pleated, with chaperon and thigh boots.
3. Anthony, bastard of Burgundy, all in black, wears a soft "sugarloaf" hat and a doublet laced at the neck with a collar. He wears the emblem of the Order of the Golden Fleece around his neck, 1467–1470.
4. Charles the Bold (right) wears a long floral patterned gown, while his attendants wear very short gowns with hose. All wear long pointed shoes, France, 1468–1470.
5. Parti-coloured hose are worn with a Giornea belted at the waist. Italy, c. 1470.
6. Giuliano de' Medici wears the high collarless Italian style at the neck, 1478.
7. Maarten van Nieuvenhov wears an open robe fastened across his chest with pairs of ribbon ties. Beneath the overgown he wears a brown velvet doublet with sleeves buttoned to the wrist. Bruges, 1487.
8. At the very end of the 15th century, Albrecht Dürer's self-portrait shows the influence of Italian fashion: His low-necked shirt or chemise of fine linen, gathered and trimmed with a band of gold braid or embroidery, is worn under an open-fronted doublet and a cloak tied over one shoulder. His hair is worn long, under a draped pointed hat with a tassel, 1498.

== Children's fashion ==
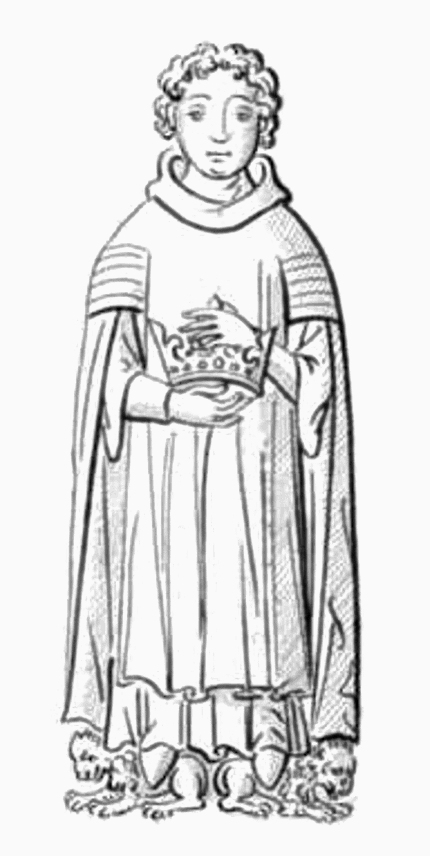
1 - c. 1401

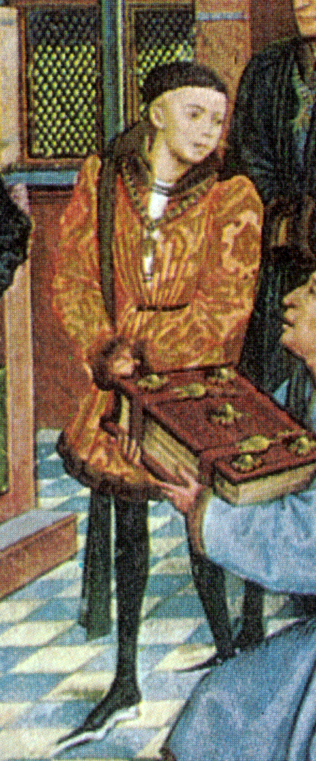
2 – 1447–1448

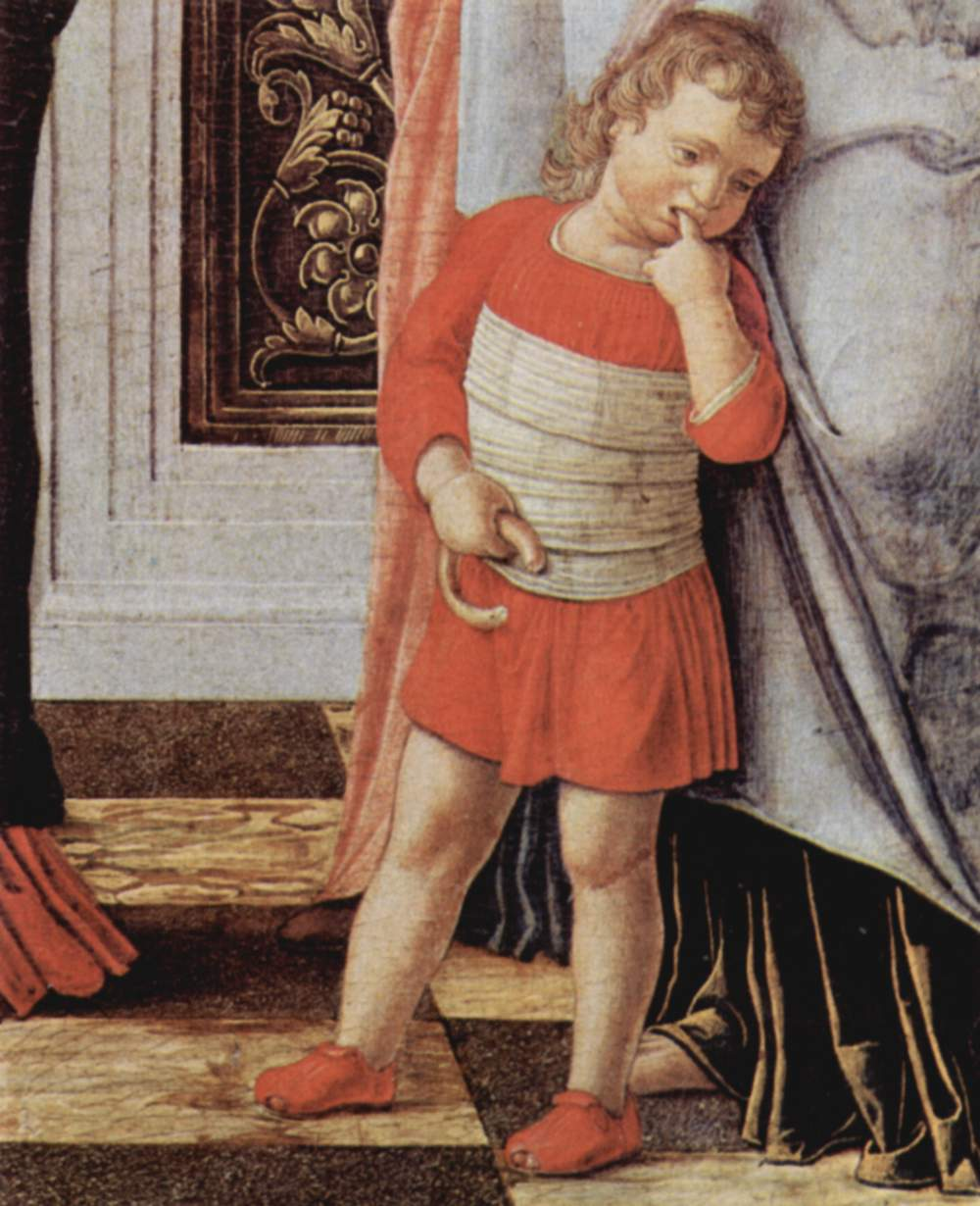
3 – 1461

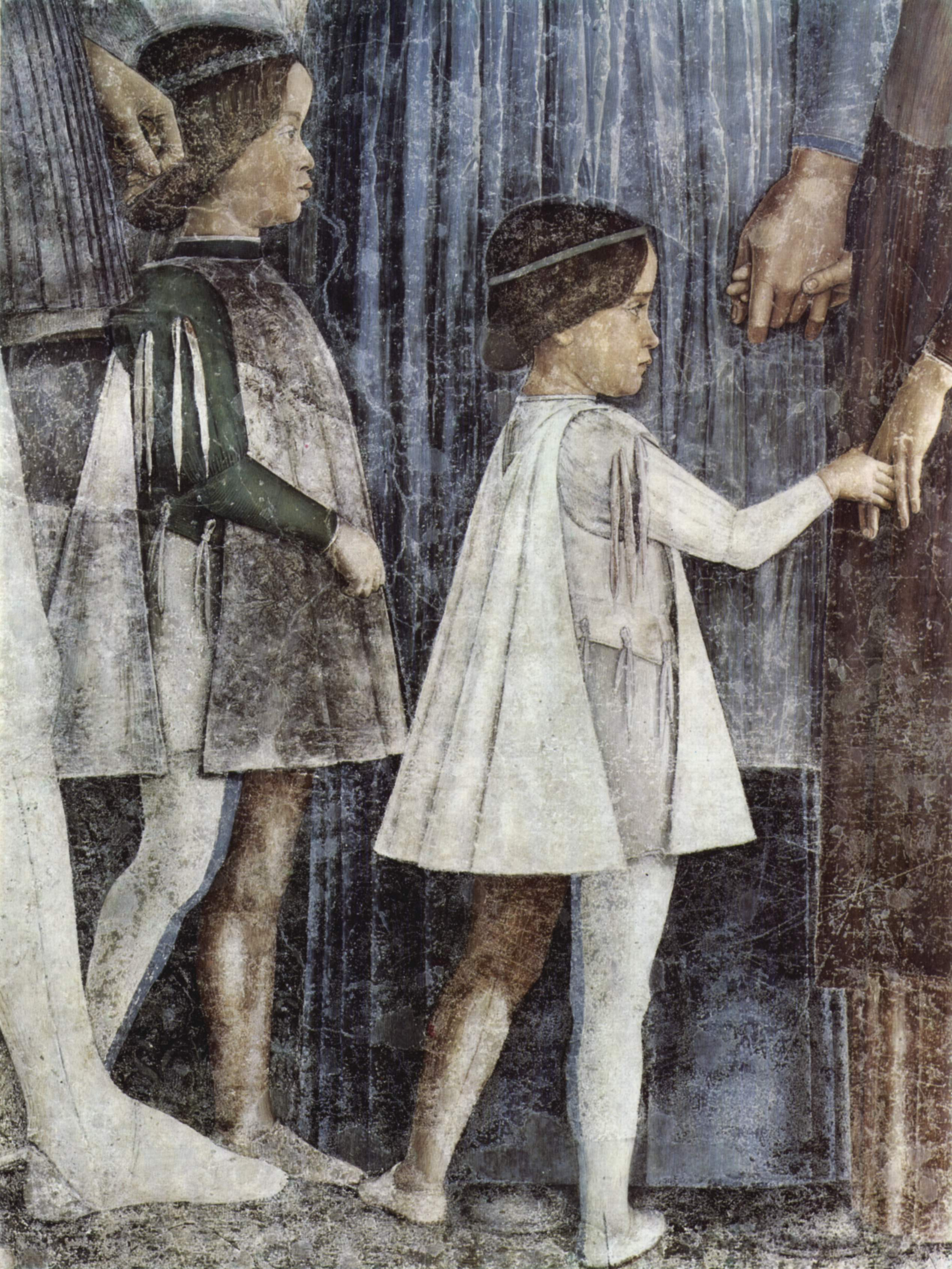
4 – 1474

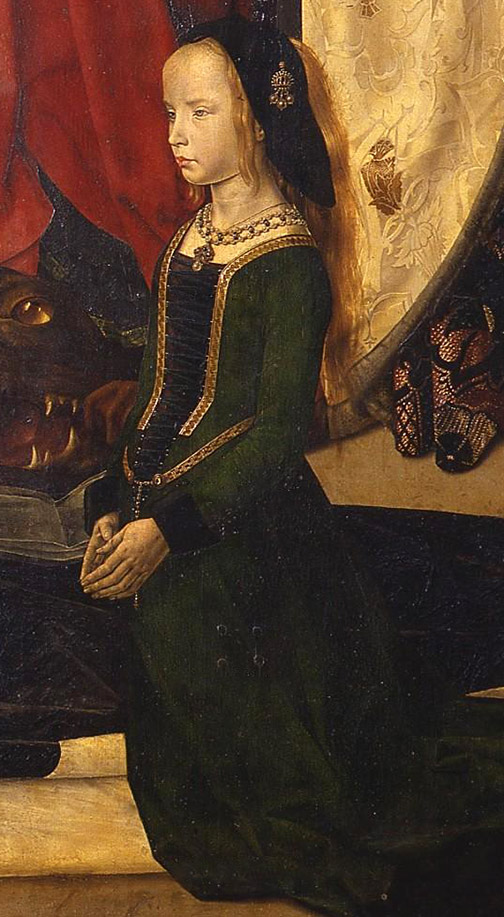
5 – 1476–1478
1. Charles VI of France, drawn after his tomb effigy. He is wearing a herigaut with tucked sleeves.
2. Charles the Bold wears a velvet gold floral figured short robe, black hose, and pointed shoes with pattens underneath, and a "pudding-basin" haircut 1447–1448.
3. Young boy holding a teething ring wears a short robe with a sash and open-toed shoes, Italy, 1461.
4. Two Gonzaga princes wear the family colours with parti-coloured hose with ornamental points (laces).
5. Margherita Portinari, a banker's daughter of Bruges, wears a green dress laced up the front with a single lace over a dark kirtle. Her hair is worn loose under a black cap with a pendant jewel, Netherlands, 1476–1478.

Children's clothing during the Italian Renaissance reflected that of their parents. In other words, kids dressed exactly like the adults and looked like miniature versions of them. As babies and toddlers, children were all put in dresses to make the potty training process easier for parents or maids. Then, around the age of 6 or 7, boys would receive their first pair of hose (called breeching).

== Working class clothing ==
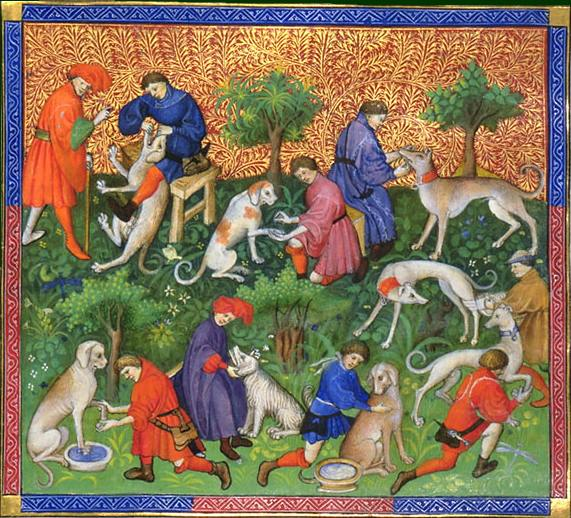
1 – 1405–1410

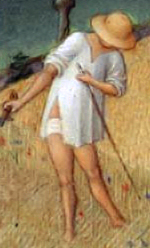
2 – 1410

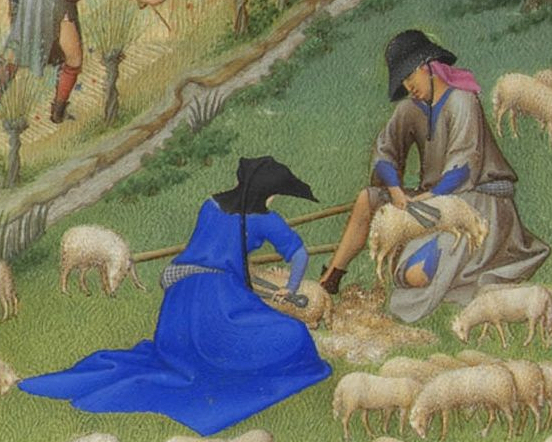
3 – 1410

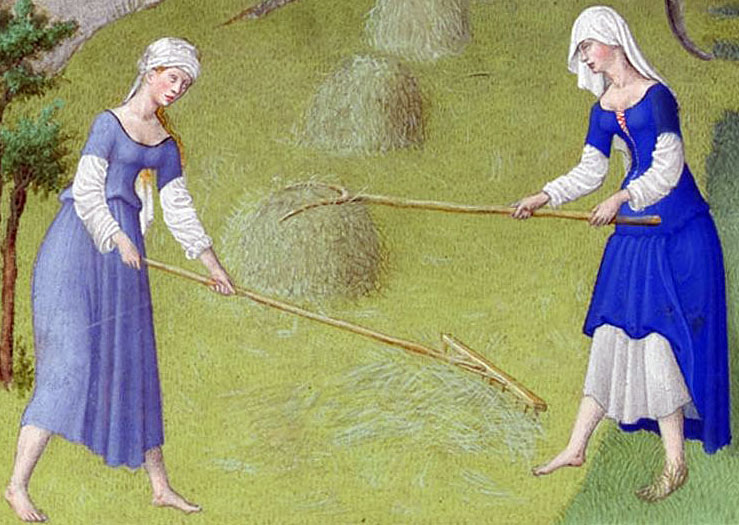
4 – 1410

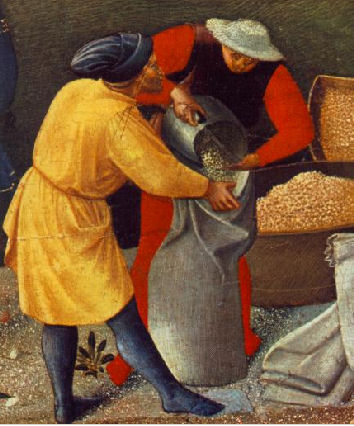
5 – 1437

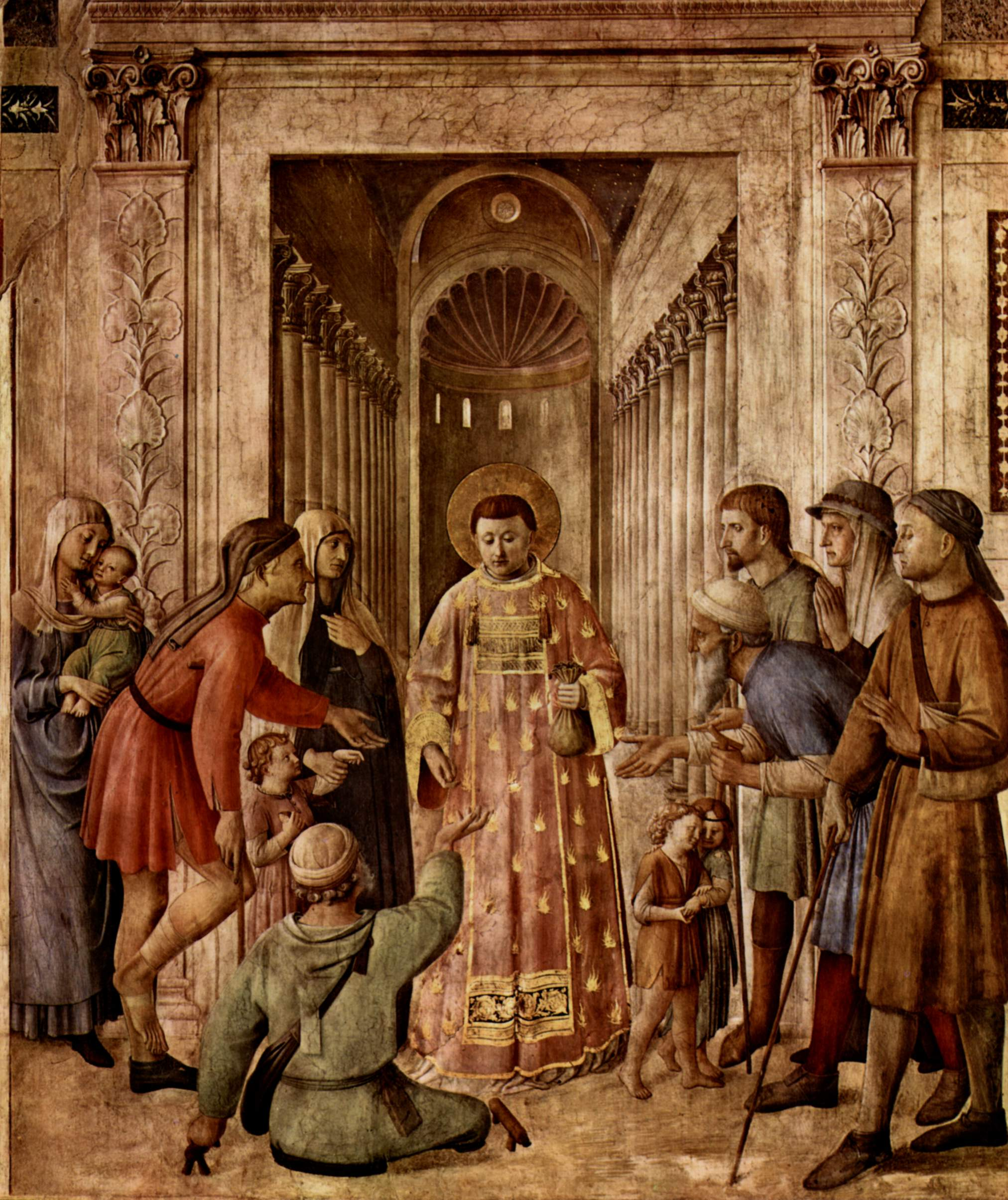
6 – late 1440s

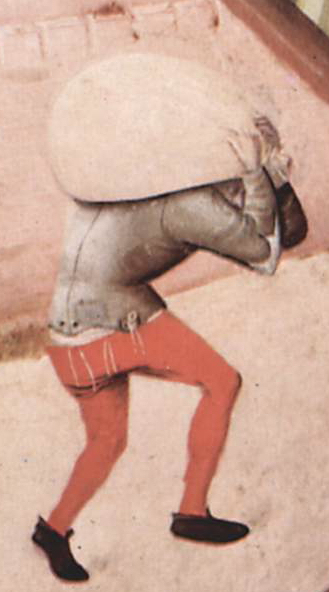
7 – 1475–1480

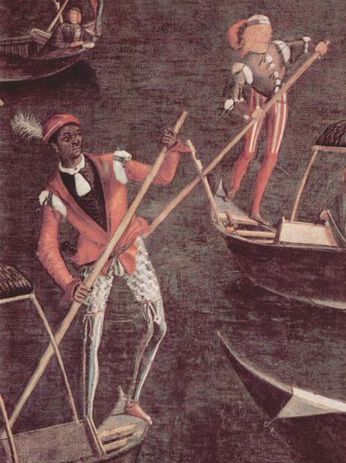
8 – 1494

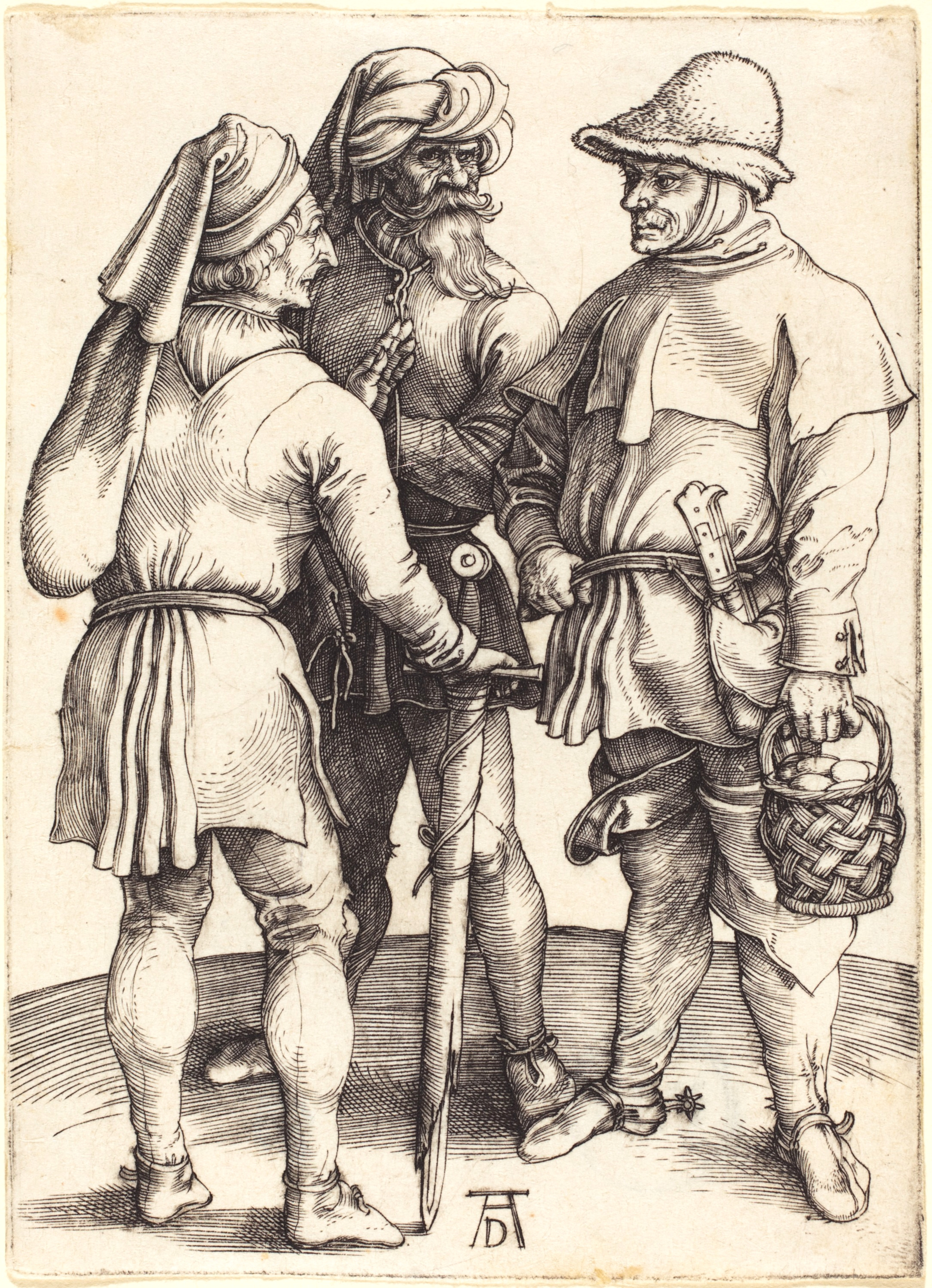
9 – 1496–97
1. Older huntsmen wear looser robes belted at the waist while younger men wear fashionable short robes fitted through the body and belted at the hip. The higher-ranking figures wear less practical clothes and chaperons, Livre de Chasse.
2. Peasant reaping in linen braies and shirt, Très Riches Heures du Duc de Berry, c 1412–1416.
3. Man and woman shearing sheep. She wears a black hood with a long liripipe and a scrip or bag at her waist. He wears a floppy black hat tied under the chin, Les Très Riches Heures du duc de Berry.
4. Women raking hay work barefoot and wear their kirtles looped up over long-sleeved linen smocks, Les Très Riches Heures du duc de Berry.
5. Workmen on a dock wear short robes with hats, Italy, Angelico, 1437.
6. The very poor of Florence receive alms in well-worn and basic versions of the clothes of the more prosperous.
7. Workman shown fastening of the hose to the short doublet by means of points or ties, Bosch 1475–1480.
8. Venetian gondoliers wear open-fronted, slashed doublets and hose divided into upper and lower sections, 1494.
9. German peasants, 1496-97.

== See also ==
- Byzantine dress
- Escoffion - horned headdress
- 1300–1400 in European fashion
- 1500–1550 in European fashion
- 1550–1600 in European fashion
