= Persecution of Jews and Muslims by Manuel I of Portugal =

Expulsion of Muslims and Jews from Portugal

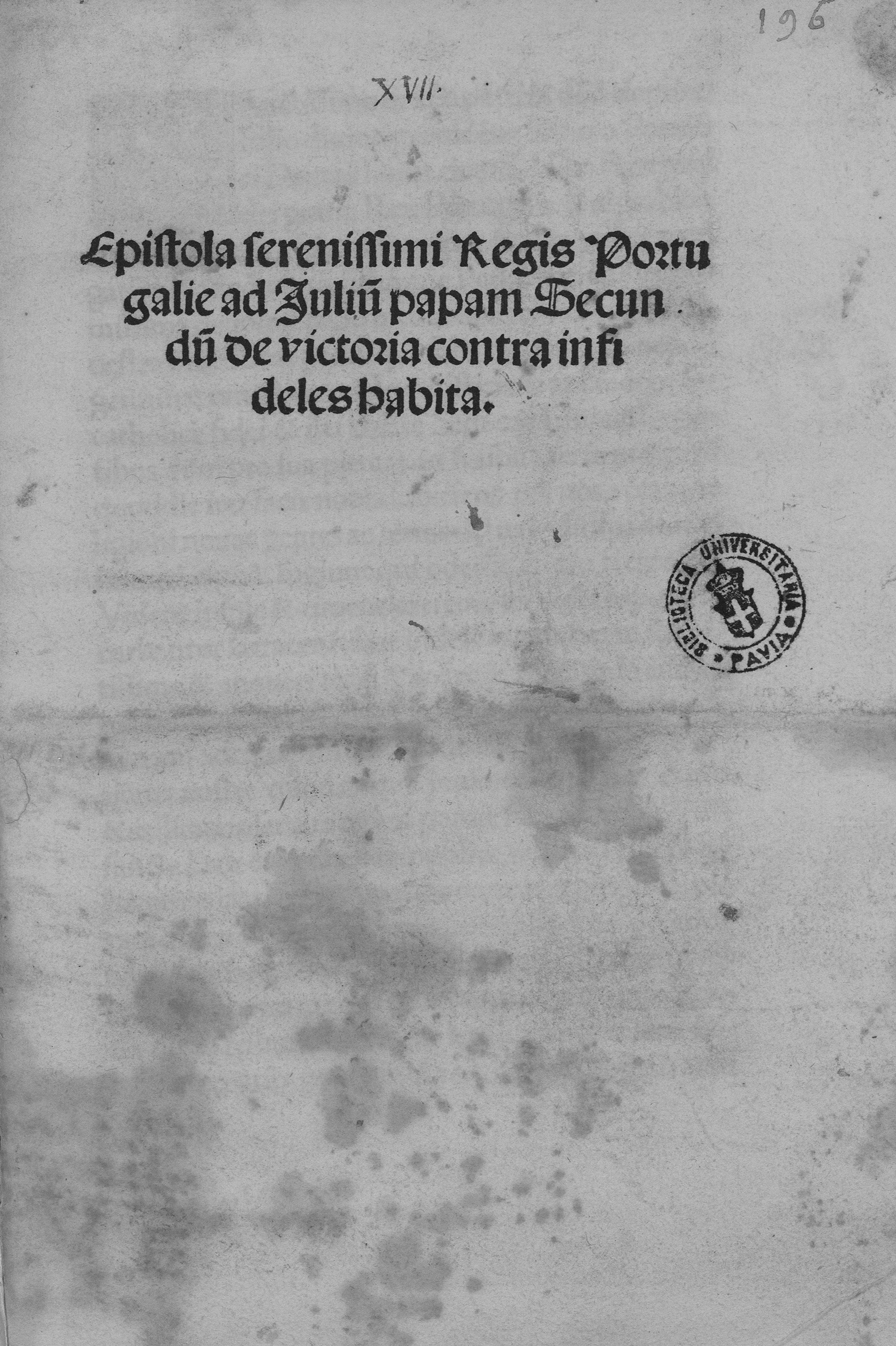
Epistola de victoria contra infideles habita, 1507

On 5 December 1496, King Manuel I of Portugal signed the decree of expulsion of Jews and Muslims to take effect by the end of October of the next year.

== Background ==
Until the 15th century, some Jews occupied prominent places in Portuguese political and economic life. For example, Isaac Abarbanel was the treasurer of King Afonso V of Portugal. Many also had an active role in Portuguese culture, and they kept their reputation of diplomats and merchants. By this time, Lisbon and Évora were home to important Jewish communities. The Jewish community, along with the Moors, had control in Spain as well, until around 1478 when Queen Isabella and King Ferdinand had started buying the land that anyone who was not Catholic had controlled.

== Expulsion of Jews ==
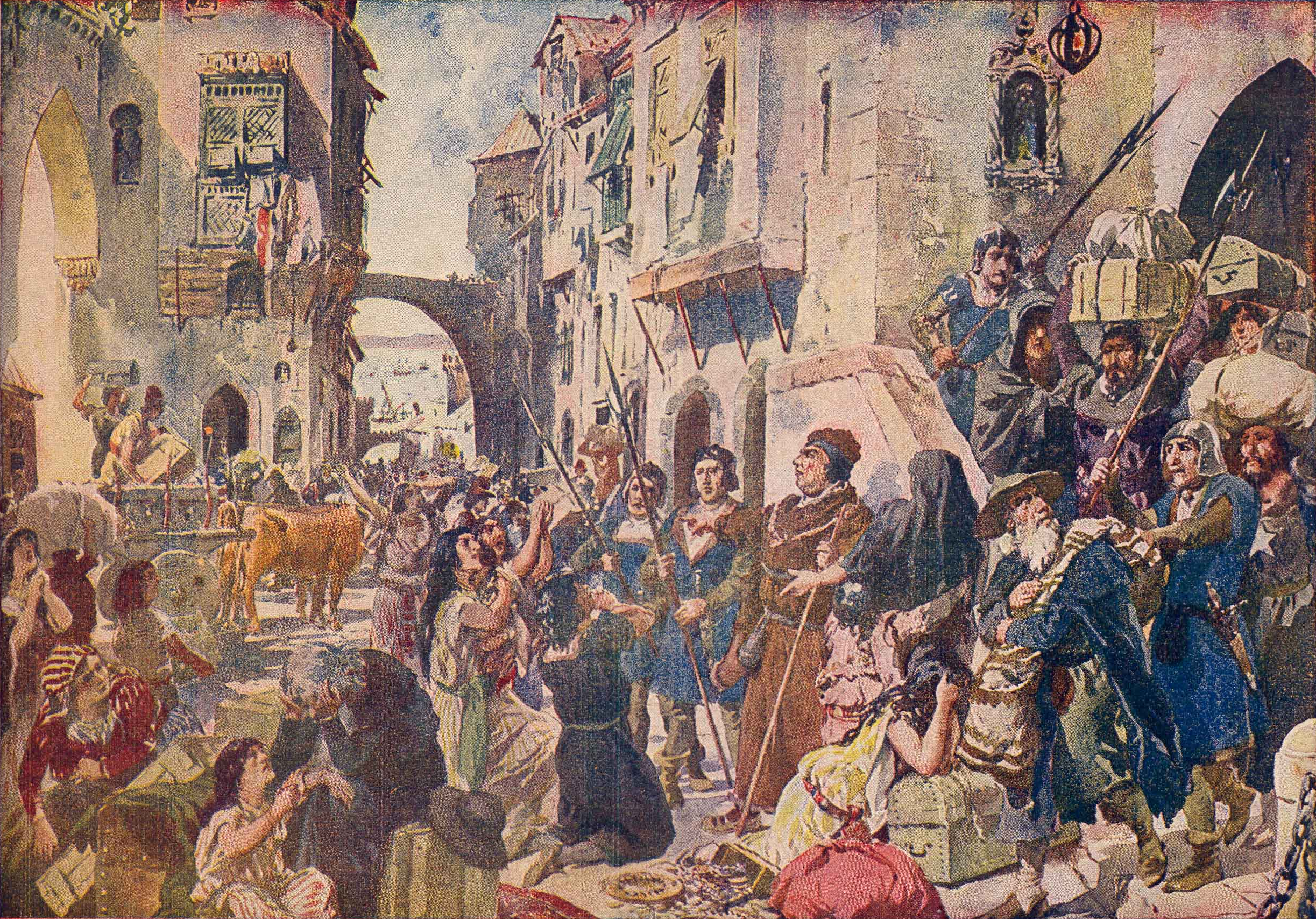
Expulsion of the Jews in 1497, in a 1917 watercolour by Alfredo Roque Gameiro

On 5 December 1496, King Manuel I of Portugal decreed that all Jews must convert to Catholicism or leave the country, in order to satisfy a request by the Catholic Monarchs of Spain during the negotiations of the contract of marriage between himself and their eldest daughter Isabella, Princess of Asturias, as an unstated condition to win her hand. The King demonstrated his wish to completely and forever eradicate Judaism from Portugal by issuing two decrees. The initial edict of expulsion of 1496 was turned into an edict of forced conversion in 1497, whereby Portuguese Jews were prevented from leaving the country and were forcibly baptized and converted to Christianity. Those Jews who refused to pay taxes in protest were deported from Portugal and abandoned to their fate in the islands of São Tomé and Príncipe, off the western coast of Africa. Hard times followed for the Portuguese conversos, with the massacre of 2,000 people in Lisbon in 1506, and later the establishment of the Portuguese Inquisition in 1536.

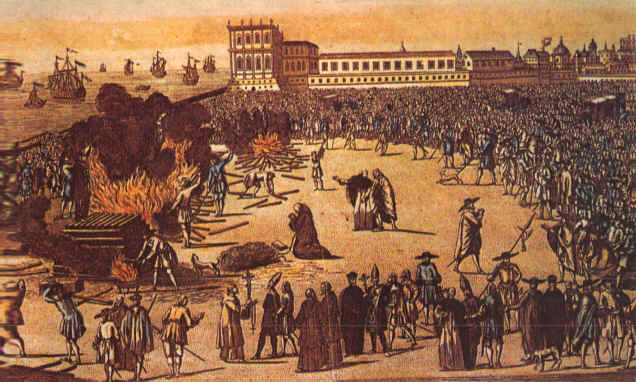
Burning of Crypto-Jews in Lisbon, Portugal

When the King allowed conversos to leave after the Lisbon massacre of 1506, many went to the Ottoman Empire, notably Salonica and Constantinople, and to the Wattasid Sultanate of Morocco. Smaller numbers went to Amsterdam, France, Brazil, Curaçao and the Antilles, Surinam and New Amsterdam. In some of these places their presence can still be perceived in the use of the Ladino language by some Jewish communities in Greece and Turkey, the Portuguese-based dialects of the Antilles, or the multiple synagogues built by those who became known as the Spanish and Portuguese Jews, such as the Amsterdam Esnoga or the Willemstad Snoa. Some of the most famous descendants of Portuguese Jews who lived outside Portugal are the philosopher Baruch Spinoza (Bento de Espinosa in Portuguese), and the classical economist David Ricardo.

=== Crypto-Jews ===
Jews who converted to Christianity were known as New Christians, and were always under the constant surveillance of the Inquisition. The Holy Office in Portugal lasted for almost three hundred years, until the Portuguese Inquisition was abolished in 1821 by the "General Extraordinary and Constituent Courts of the Portuguese Nation". Many of those New Christians were crypto-Jews who continued to secretly practice their religion; they eventually left the country in the centuries to come, and openly embraced their Jewish faith again in foreign lands. Such was the case, for example, of the ancestors of Baruch Spinoza in the Netherlands. Some other Portuguese Jews, very few in number like the Belmonte Jews, opted for a different and radical solution, practicing their faith in a strictly secret manner among a rural and isolated community. Known as the "Last of the Marranos", some have survived until today (especially the Jewish community from Belmonte in Castelo Branco, plus some scattered families) by their practice of intermarriage and their very limited cultural contacts with the outside world. Only recently, in the late 20th century, have they re-established contact with the international Jewish community and openly practice their religion in a public synagogue with a formal rabbi.

== Expulsion of Muslims ==
According to contemporary historian François Soyer, the expulsion of Muslims from Portugal has been overshadowed by the forced conversion of Jews in the country. While tolerance of Muslim minorities in Portugal was higher than in any other part of Europe, Muslims were still perceived as "alien." Anti-Muslim riots were regular in neighboring Valencia during the 1460s; however, no similar acts of violence occurred in Portugal.

In December 1496, Manuel I ordered all Muslim subjects to leave without any apparent provocation. According to 16th-century Portuguese historians Damião de Góis and Jerónimo Osório, the Portuguese government originally planned to forcibly convert or execute Muslims as they had done to Jews, but fear of retaliation from Muslim kingdoms in North Africa led the king to settle on deportations instead. Manuel I's motivation behind the order is unclear, but some contemporary historians say it was part of a greater goal of Queen Isabella and King Ferdinand (known as the "Catholic Monarchs") to rid the peninsula of Muslims and create "religious uniformity" and "monolithic Catholic Christian unity". Other historians say it was influenced by ambitions of conquering Morocco, or by the suggestion of the Dominican confessor to the king, Friar Jorge Vogado. Some Muslims found refuge in Castile, but most fled to North Africa.

== Return of some Jews to Portugal ==
In 1525, David Reubeni, a Jewish man who claimed to be the commander of a Jewish army in the Ottoman Empire, arrived in Portugal. With the approval of the Pope, he sought the Portuguese king’s assistance in providing him with ammunition to fight against the Muslims. Reubeni stayed in Portugal for several months, during which he sparked messianic expectations among the New Christians. His actions also led to the conversion of Solomon Molcho, which ultimately resulted to the King of Portugal expelling Reubeni from the country.

In the 19th century, some affluent families of Sephardi Jewish Portuguese origin such as the Ruah and Bensaude, resettled in Portugal from Morocco. The first synagogue to be built in Portugal since the 15th century was the Lisbon Synagogue, inaugurated in 1904.

In 2014 the Portuguese parliament changed the Portuguese nationality law in order to grant Portuguese nationality to descendants of Sephardi Jews expelled from Portugal. The law is a reaction to historical events that led to their expulsion from Portugal, but also due to increased concerns over Jewish communities throughout Europe. In order to obtain Portuguese nationality, the person must attest being a direct descendant of a Sephardi of Portuguese origin or family connections in a collateral line from a former Portuguese Sephardi community. Use of expressions in Portuguese in Jewish rites or Judaeo-Portuguese or Ladino can also be considered proof.

From 2015 several hundred Turkish Jews who were able to prove descent from Portuguese Jews expelled in 1497 emigrated to Portugal and acquired Portuguese citizenship.

== See also ==
- Pallache family

== Sources ==
Soyer, François (2007). The Persecution of the Jews and Muslims of Portugal: King Manuel I and the End of Religious Tolerance (1496–7). Leiden, The Netherlands: Koninklijke Brill NV. ISBN 9789004162624.
