= Halfon =

Halfon (Hebrew: חלפון) is a Hebrew surname. Notable people with the surname include:

- Abba Mari Halfon
- Alon Halfon (born 1973), Israeli footballer
- Ben-Zion Halfon (1930–1977), Israeli politician
- Eduardo Halfon (born 1971), Guatemalan writer
- Elijah Menahem Halfon
- Felix Halfon (born 1972), Israeli footballer
- Florencia Halfon Laksman (born 1982), Argentine journalist
- Lianne Halfon
- Malka Halfon
- Mercedes Halfon (born 1980), Argentine writer
- Mordechai Halfon (born 1957), Israeli footballer
- Robert Halfon (born 1969), English politician
- Simon Halfon, British graphic designer

== See also ==
- Kalfon
