= Daniel Da Pisa =

16th-century head of Rome's Jewish community

Daniel Da Pisa (Hebrew: דניאל מפיזה) was one of the heads of the Jewish community in Rome at the beginning of the 16th century.

He organized the community after large numbers of refugees arrived in the city of Rome in the late 15th and early 16th centuries, establishing eleven synagogues there. They demanded representation in the community's administration, which was in charge of the city's Jews. Da Pisa was in a position of control that influenced the allocation of public expenses among community members, and he created the bylaws of the new community. The major struggle was between the "Italians" – the permanent residents of Rome and the old affiliates – against the newcomers who arrived "beyond the mountains" – the Alps – the Ashkenazim and also the exiles who arrived in the city from southern Italy – the kingdom of the Catholic Monarchs Ferdinand II of Aragon and Isabella I of Castile.

Da Pisa came from an important banking family from Rome, which moved to Tuscany, and he was a successful banker. He was wealthy and cultured and accepted by the Medici family. He earned the esteem of Pope Clement VII, who was of Florentine origin from Tuscany. He was the one who recommended to him to welcome David Reubeni.

The banker wrote a constitution for the community, submitted it for its approval, and the Pope gave it official approval in his bull dated December 12, 1524. And so it became binding on the community. According to it, bankers, nobles, and men of modest wealth were summoned in equal numbers to choose representatives for the committee (congrega), which numbered 60 people – half Italians and half immigrants. Daniel Da Pisa was aided by the physician and Biblical commentator Rabbi Obadiah Sforno, and the physician Isaac Zarfati. If there was a tie, the Italians got an additional representative.

Next to them was an executive authority of three administrators (fattori), two overseers (camerllenghi) – one worked as a treasurer and the other as an accountant, and they rotated positions every six months. Additional decisions included that an excommunication would be approved by the administrators. It was also determined that a severe punishment "if a single small informer arises, acting maliciously, to spy and harm the community with words or deeds" – he can be brought to "complete ruin". This leadership framework lasted until the 20th century.
