= Jewish hat =

Cone-shaped pointed hat, worn by Jews in Medieval Europe and parts of the Islamic world

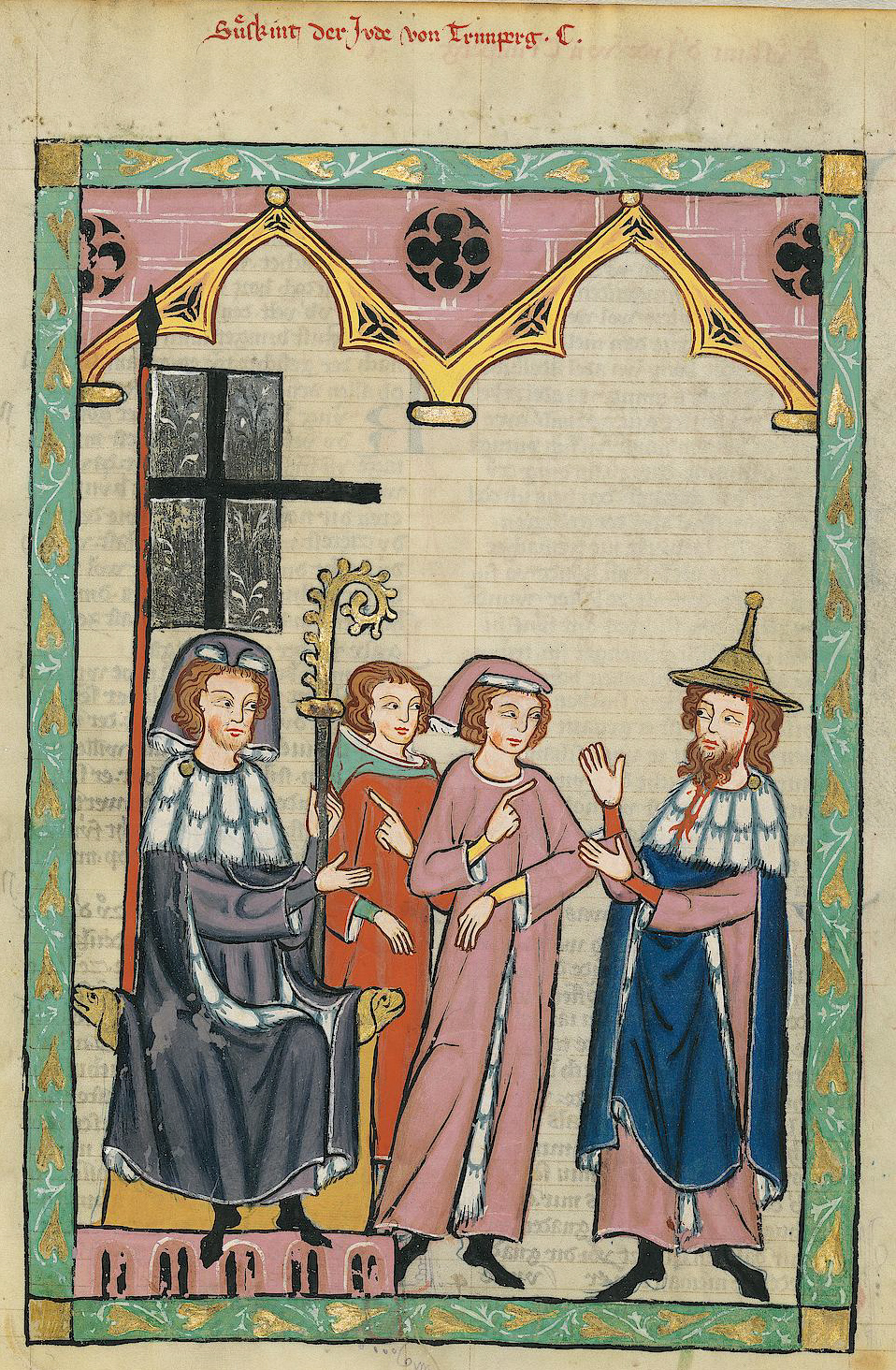
The Jewish poet Süßkind von Trimberg (on the right) wearing a Jewish hat (Codex Manesse, fourteenth century)

The Jewish hat, also known as the Jewish cap, Judenhut (German) or Latin pileus cornutus ("horned skullcap"), was generally a cone-shaped pointed hat, often white or yellow, worn by Jews in Medieval Europe. Initially worn by choice, its wearing was enforced in some places in Europe after the 1215 Fourth Council of the Lateran for adult male Jews to wear while outside a ghetto to distinguish them from others. Like the Phrygian cap that it often resembles, the hat may have originated in pre-Islamic Persia, as a similar hat was worn by Babylonian Jews.

Modern distinctive or characteristic Jewish forms of male headgear include the kippah (skullcap), shtreimel, spodik, kolpik, and kashkets; see also Hasidic clothing.

== Europe ==
=== Shape ===
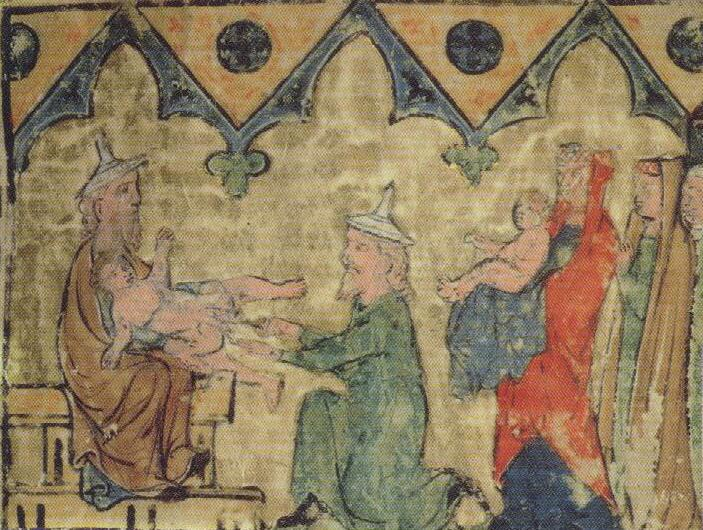
Circumcision of Isaac, in the Jewish manuscript the "Regensburg Pentateuch", Germany, c. 1300

The shape of the hat is variable. Sometimes, especially in the thirteenth century, it is a soft Phrygian cap, but rather more common in the early period is a hat with a round circular brim—apparently stiff—curving round to a tapering top that ends in a point, called the "so-called oil-can type" by Sara Lipton. Smaller versions perching on top of the head are also seen. Sometimes a ring of some sort encircles the hat an inch or two over the top of the head. In the fourteenth century a ball or bobble appears at the top of the hat, and the tapering end becomes more of a stalk with a relatively constant width. The top of the hat becomes flatter, or rounded (as in the Codex Manesse picture). The materials used are unclear from art, and may have included metal and woven plant materials as well as stiffened textiles and leather.

By the end of the Middle Ages the hat is steadily replaced by a variety of headgear including exotic flared Eastern style hats, turbans and, from the fifteenth century, wide flat hats and large berets. In pictures of Biblical scenes these sometimes represent attempts to portray the contemporary dress of the time worn in the Holy Land, but all the same styles are to be seen in some images of contemporary European scenes. Where a distinctive pointed Jewish hat remains it has become much less defined in shape, and baggy. Loose turbans, wide flat hats, and berets, as well as new fur hat styles from the Pale of Settlement, remain associated with Jews up to the eighteenth century and beyond.

=== History ===
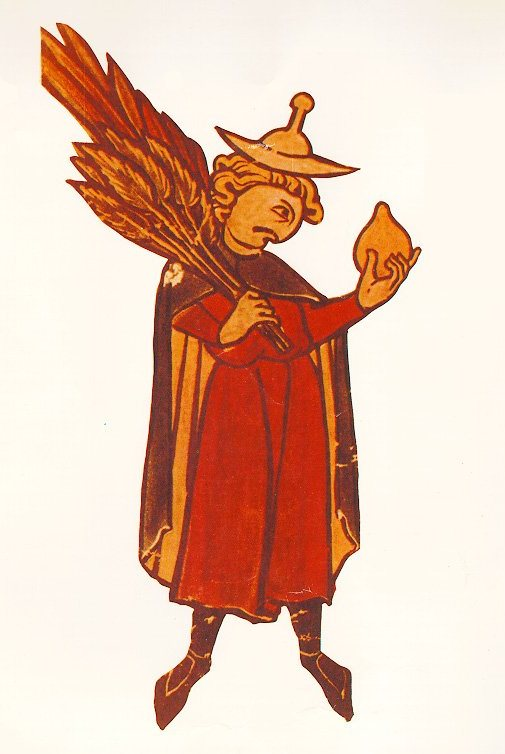
Figure in a Jewish hat holding a citron (etrog) for the holiday of sukkot in a medieval Hebrew calendar

The origin of the hat is unclear, although it is often seen as ultimately evolving from the same origin as the mitre, perhaps from late Roman styles, which may themselves derive from the hats of ancient Persian clergy. Hats worn (by Pharaoh's advisors, among others) in the illustrations to the Old English Hexateuch, a manuscript of around 1030, have been seen as an early form, and they appear in the Mosan Stavelot Bible of 1097.

The first recorded instance of a “Jewish hat” or “Judenhut” was around the 11th century in the Flanders region. The wearing of these distinctive hats originate from European Christians who wore such hats before mandating that it become a symbol for European Jews. According to Sara Lipton, "The few surviving early medieval references to Jewish clothing likewise suggest that Jews dressed no differently from their Gentile neighbor".

In Europe, the Jewish hat was worn in France from the eleventh century, and Italy from the twelfth. The Gniezno Doors were probably made in Germany around 1175, and two Jewish merchants depicted on the doors wear them. Under Jewish law, observant Jews should keep their heads covered almost all the time, and indeed men of all religious groups tended to wear hats when outside in the Middle Ages to a much greater extent than today.

Unlike the yellow badge, the Jewish hat is often seen in illustrated Hebrew manuscripts, and was later included by German Jews in their seals and coats of arms, suggesting that at least initially it was regarded by European Jews as "an element of traditional garb, rather than an imposed discrimination". The hat is also worn in Christian pictures by figures such as Saint Joseph and sometimes Jesus (see below). However, once "made obligatory, the hat, hitherto deliberately different from hats worn by Christians, was viewed by Jews in a negative light". A provincial synod held in Breslau in 1267 said that since Jews had stopped wearing the pointed hats they used to wear, this would be made compulsory.

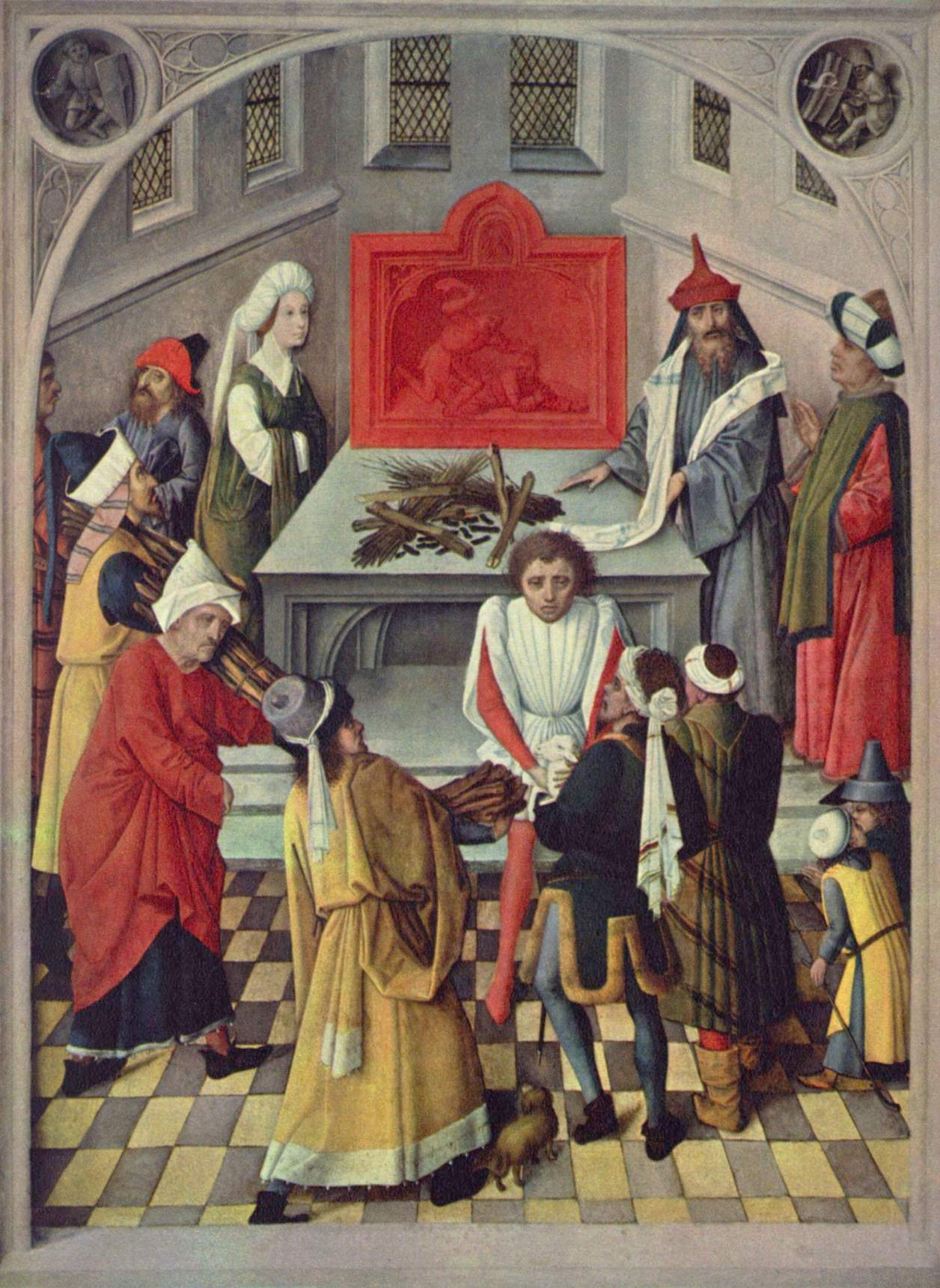
Christian painting of an Old Testament sacrifice, 1483, with various forms of Jewish hat, as well as turbans and other exotic styles. By this date it is hard to judge how illustrations like these relate to actual contemporary dress in Europe, or are an attempt to recreate historically appropriate ancient dress from styles of the contemporary Middle East.

The Fourth Council of the Lateran of 1215 ruled that Jews and Muslims must be distinguishable by their dress (Latin "habitus"), the rationale given being: "In some provinces the dress of Jews and Saracens distinguishes them from Christians, but in others a degree of confusion has arisen, so that they cannot be recognised by any distinguishing marks. As a result, in error Christians have sexual intercourse with Jewish or Saracen women, and Jews and Saracens have intercourse with Christian women. In order that the crime of such an accursed mingling shall not in future have an excuse and an evasion under the pretext of error, we resolve that (Jews and Saracens) of both sexes in all Christian lands shall distinguish themselves publicly from other people by their dress. According to the testimony of scripture, such a precept was already made by Moses (Lev.19.19; Deut.22.5.11)".

=== Local regulations ===
However, not all European medieval monarchs followed these pontifical resolutions. King Andrew II of Hungary (1177–1235) ignored demands from the Pope on several occasions; this gained him excommunication twice. At that time many Jews were in royal service. The excommunications even forbade Andrew II from being present at his daughter Elisabeth of Hungary's canonization in Germany. The hat was mostly found north of the Alps, despite some of the earliest examples being seen in Italy, and was not found in Spain.

Additional rules were imposed by local rulers at various times. The council decision was confirmed by the Council of Vienne of 1311–12. In 1267 the hat was made compulsory in Vienna. A doctor (Jacob Mantino) was given a temporary dispensation from wearing it in Venice in 1528, at the request of various distinguished patients (at the time in Venice each profession had special clothing rules). Pope Paul IV ordered in 1555 that in the Papal States it must be a yellow, peaked hat, and from 1567 for twenty years it was compulsory in Lithuania, but by this period it is rarely seen in most of Europe.

As an outcome of the Jewish Emancipation its use was formally discontinued, although it had been declining long before that, and is not often seen after 1500; the various forms of the yellow badge were far more long-lasting. This was an alternative form of distinguishing mark, not found in Europe before 1215, and later reintroduced by the Nazis. It was probably more widely required by local laws, for example English legislation concentrated on the badge, which took the form of the two Tablets of the Law. In some pictures from all parts of the Middle Ages, rabbis or other Jewish leaders wear the Jewish hat when other Jews do not, which may reflect reality.

Such examples of this hat-wearing can be seen nearly 350 years after the Fourth Lateran Council. Regions divided into many states, such as Renaissance Italy and Germany, had local laws in this as in other fields, leading to difficulties for travellers who might not be aware of the local regulations. For example, in Italy a Leone Segele was arrested in Lodi for wearing a black hat, as was acceptable in his home city of Genoa, instead of a yellow one, required in Lodi. These dress codes became a normal part of what it meant to be a Jew living inside Catholic dominated European societies.

In a late addition to local rulings, the very strict and locally unpopular Counter Reformation Pope Paul IV ordered in 1555 that all Jews in Rome were required to wear the yellow hat "under the severest penalties." When he died, his statue, erected before the Campidoglio just months before, had a yellow hat placed on it (similar to the yellow hat Paul IV had forced Jews to wear in public). After a mock trial, the statue was decapitated. It was then thrown into the Tiber.

== In art ==
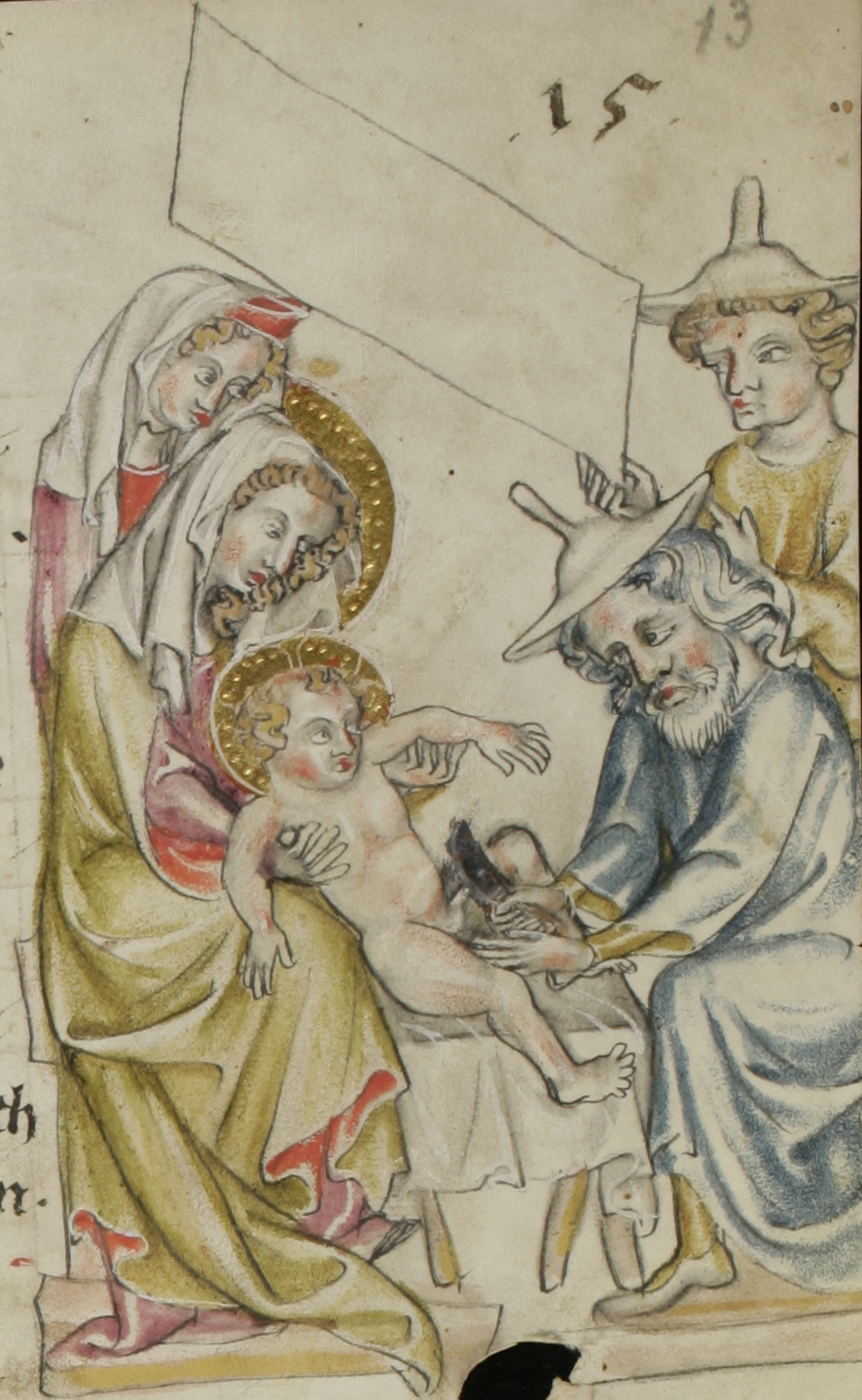
Circumcision of Christ, Austria, c. 1340

The Jewish hat is frequently used in medieval art to denote Jews of the Biblical period. Often the Jews so shown are those shown in an unfavourable light by the story being depicted, such as the money-changers expelled by Jesus from the Temple (Matthew 21:12–17), but this is by no means always the case. The husband of Mary, Saint Joseph, is often shown wearing a Jewish hat, and Jesus himself may be shown wearing one, especially in depictions of the Meeting at Emmaus, where his disciples do not recognise him at first (Luke.24.13-32). Sometimes it is used to distinguish Jews from other peoples such as Egyptians or Philistines. It is often depicted in art from times and places where the hat does not seem to have actually been commonly worn by Jews, "as an external and largely arbitrary sign devised by Christian iconographers", one of a number of useful visual ways of identifying types of persons in medieval art. In notable contrast to forms of Jewish badge, the Jewish hat is often seen in Hebrew manuscript illuminations such as Haggadot made in medieval Europe (picture above). In the Birds' Head Haggadah (Germany, c. 1300), the figures wear the hat when sitting to eat the Passover Seder.

However, in Christian art the wearing of the hat can sometimes be seen to express an attitude to those wearing it. In one extreme example in a manuscript of the Bible moralisée, an illustration shows the rod of Aaron, which has turned into a serpent, turning on the Pharaoh's magicians (Exodus, 7:10-12); Moses and Aaron do not wear the hat but the Egyptian magicians do, signifying not that they are Jews, but that they are like Jews, i.e. on the wrong side of the dispute. The paired roundel below shows two tonsured clerics confronting a group of hat-wearing Jews, and has a Latin caption explaining "Moses and Aaron signify good prelates who, in explaining the words of the Gospel, devour the false words of the Jews". In another scene showing the conversion of Jews and other non-Christians at the end of the world, a series of figures show different stages of removing their hats to signify the stages they have reached in their conversion, so that "the hat does not just identify Jews; it functions independently of its placement to signify infidelity and recalcitrant Jewishness". Other scenes in Christian art where some characters often wear it include the Circumcision of Christ and Saint Helena Finding the True Cross, where the medieval legend specified a Jewish character. The Jewish hat worn in reality was probably less pointy than is usually shown in art.

William III the Brave (1425–1482) of Meissen, minted a silver groschen known as the Judenkopf Groschen. Its obverse portrait shows a man with a pointed beard wearing a Judenhut, which the populace took as depicting a typical Jew.

== Transfer ==
When the plague broke out in 1349, Jews were expelled from much of German-speaking Europe. The pointed hat which had formerly been used to depict Jews, now was also used for other outcasts. Naomi Lubrich claims that the pointed hat was transferred in iconography to criminals, pagans, and other non-Christian outsiders, in particular sorcerers and dwarfs. Among the examples are laws, for example in Hungary in 1421, according to which people convicted of sorcery were forced to put on a Jewish hat for public shaming.

== Regulated dress for Jews in the Islamic world ==
To ensure clear differentiation between dhimmis and Muslims in public spaces, Muslim authorities frequently implemented dress codes that mandated specific garments for non-Muslims. This often involved the imposition of distinctive attire, typically in bright colors, along with designated headgear, although the latter was not always the most significant component. The regulations governing the apparel of Christians and Jews were subject to variation over time, with instances where the prescribed dress differed and others where it aligned. Similar to practices observed in Christian Europe, the extent to which these dress codes were enforced remains difficult to ascertain and likely fluctuated considerably based on regional and temporal factors.

Islamic scholars cited the Pact of Umar in which Christians supposedly took an obligation to "always dress in the same way wherever we may be, and… bind the zunar [wide belt] round our waists". Al-Nawawi required dhimmis to wear a piece of yellow cloth, a belt, and a metallic ring inside public baths.

Regulations on dhimmi clothing varied frequently to please the whims of the ruler. Although the initiation of such regulations is usually attributed to Umar I, historical evidence suggests that the Abbasid caliphs pioneered this practice. In 850, the caliph al‑Mutawakkil ordered Christians and Jews to wear both a sash called a zunnar and a distinctive kind of shawl or headscarf called a taylasin. (The Christians had already been required to wear the sash.) He also required them to wear small bells in public baths. In the eleventh century, the Fatimid caliph Al-Hakim bi-Amr Allah, whose various extreme decrees and actions are usually attributed to mental illness, ordered Christians to put on half-meter (20 inch) wooden crosses and Jews to wear wooden calves—a reference to the episode of the golden calf recounted in Exodus 32:1–4 in the Torah—around their necks. In the late twelfth century, Almohad ruler Abu Yusuf ordered the Jews of the Maghreb to wear dark blue garments with long sleeves and saddle-like caps. His grandson Abdallah al-Adil conceded to appeals from the Jews, relaxing the required clothing to yellow garments and turbans. In the sixteenth century, Jews of the Maghreb could wear only sandals made of rushes and black turbans or caps with an extra red piece of cloth.

Ottoman sultans continued to regulate the clothing of their non-Muslim subjects. In 1577, Murad III issued a firman forbidding Jews and Christians from wearing dresses, turbans, and sandals. In 1580, he changed his mind, restricting the previous prohibition to turbans and requiring dhimmis to wear black shoes; Jews and Christians also had to wear red and black hats, respectively. Observing in 1730 that some Muslims took to the habit of wearing caps similar to those of the Jews, Mahmud I ordered the hanging of the perpetrators. Mustafa III personally helped to enforce his decrees regarding clothes. In 1758, he was walking incognito in Istanbul and ordered the beheading of a Jew and an Armenian seen dressed in forbidden attire. The last Ottoman decree affirming the distinctive clothing for dhimmis was issued in 1837 by Mahmud II. Discriminatory clothing was not enforced in those Ottoman provinces where Christians were the majority, such as Greece and the Balkans.

== Gallery ==
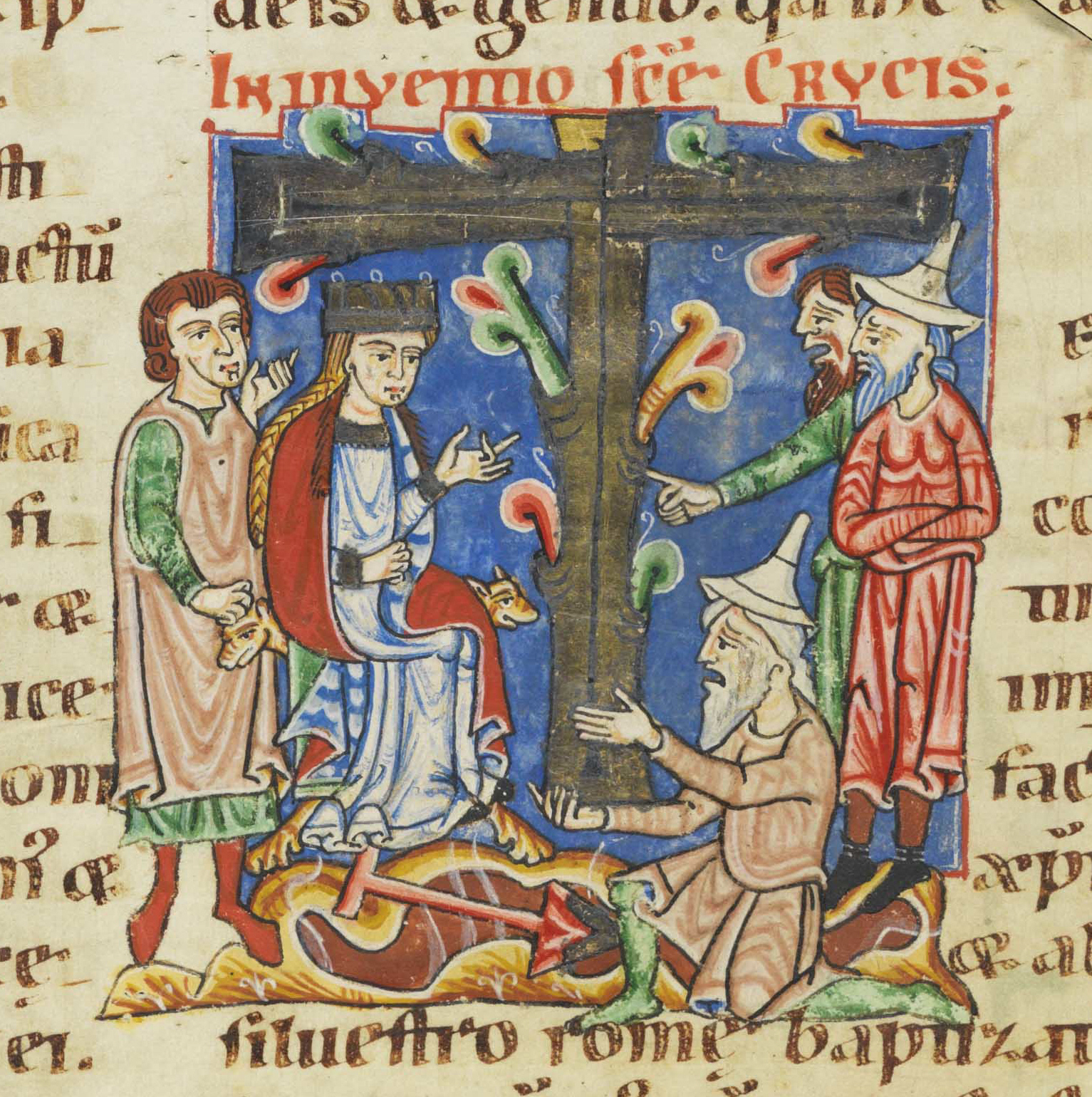
Saint Helena Finding the True Cross, Weissenau Abbey, Germany, c. 1170

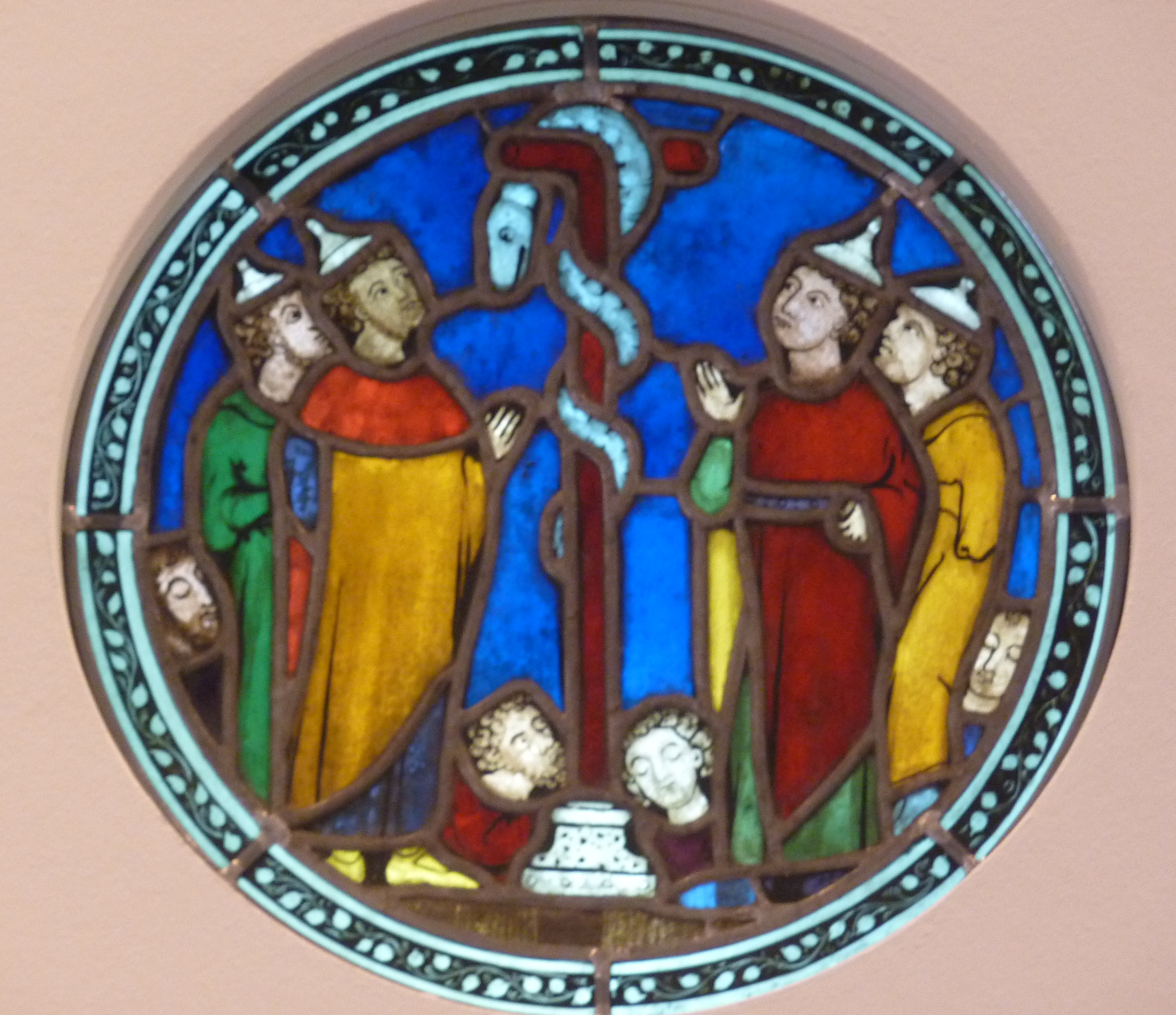
Moses and the Bronze Serpent, German, c. 1225–1230

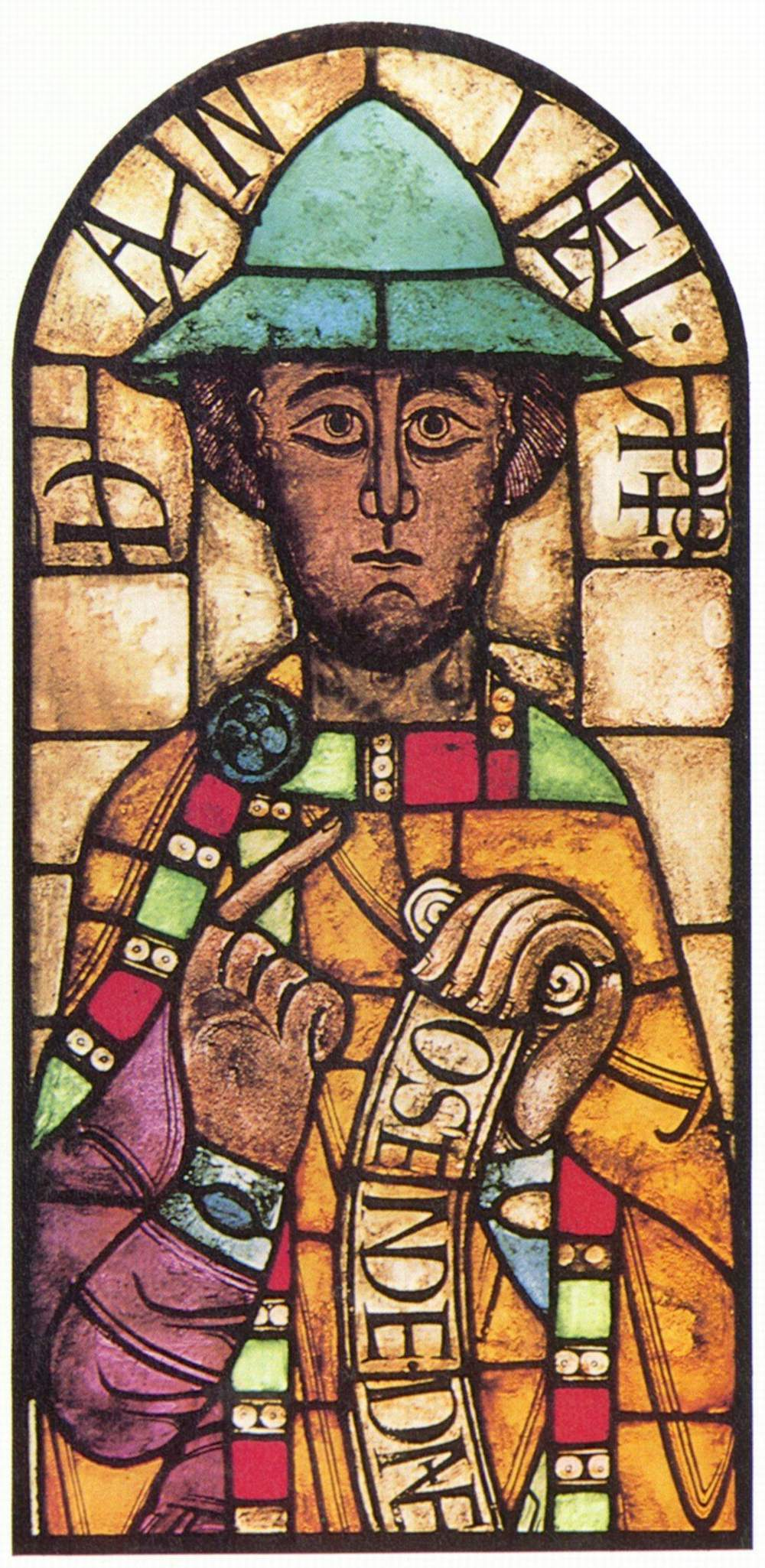
Daniel in stained glass, Augsburg, Germany, first half of twelfth century

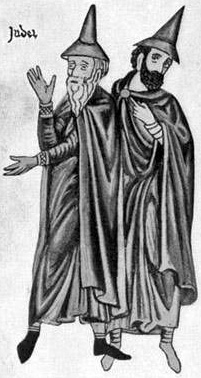
German Jews of the twelfth century. From Herrad von Landsperg, Hortus deliciarum

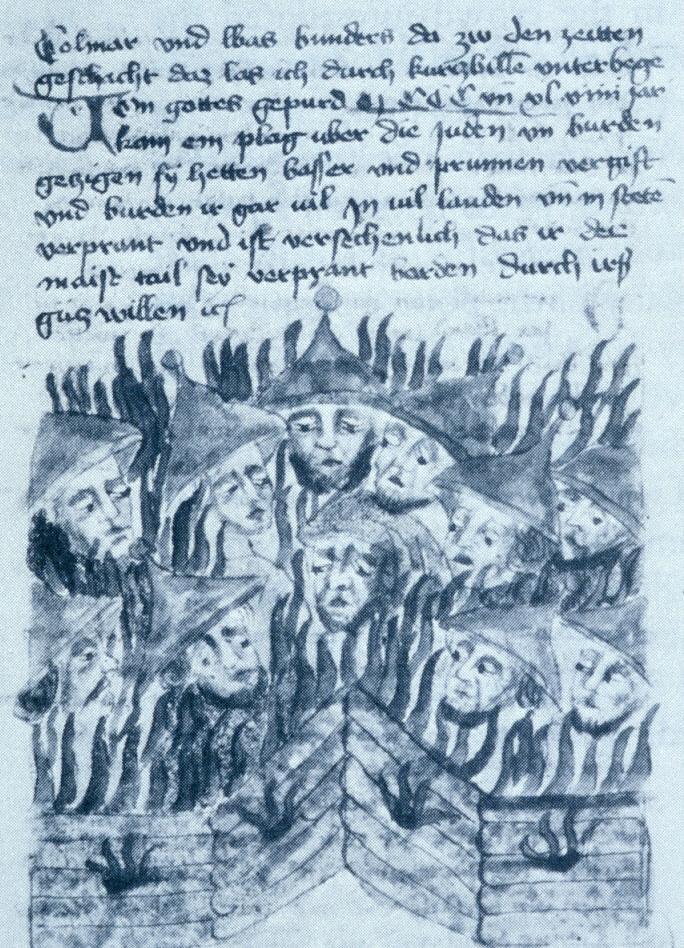
Burning and killing of Jews by the Knight Volkmar at the time of the First Crusade (Prague)

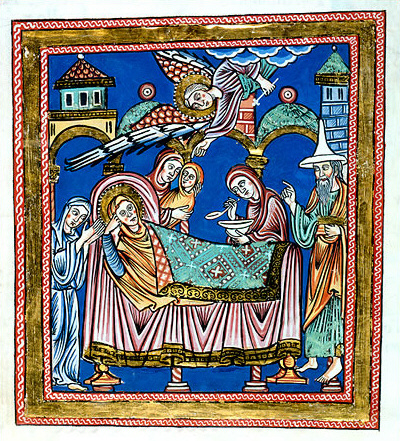
Twelfth-century German Nativity of Mary with Mary's father Joachim wearing the hat

Coat of arms of Judenburg, Austria

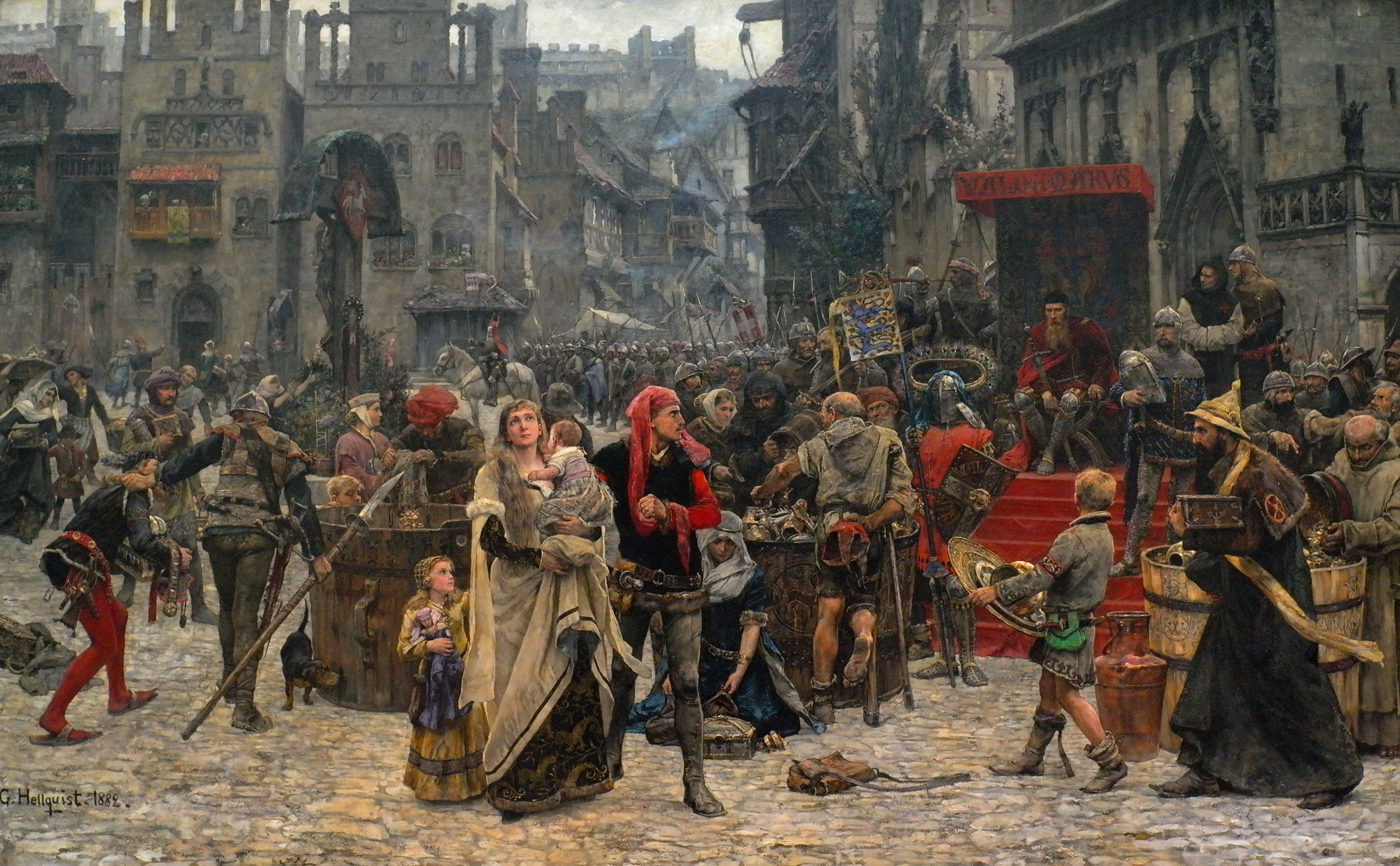
Valdemar Atterdag holding Visby to ransom, 1361, by Carl Gustaf Hellqvist (1851–1890) features a Jewish merchant wearing a Judenhut (at right).

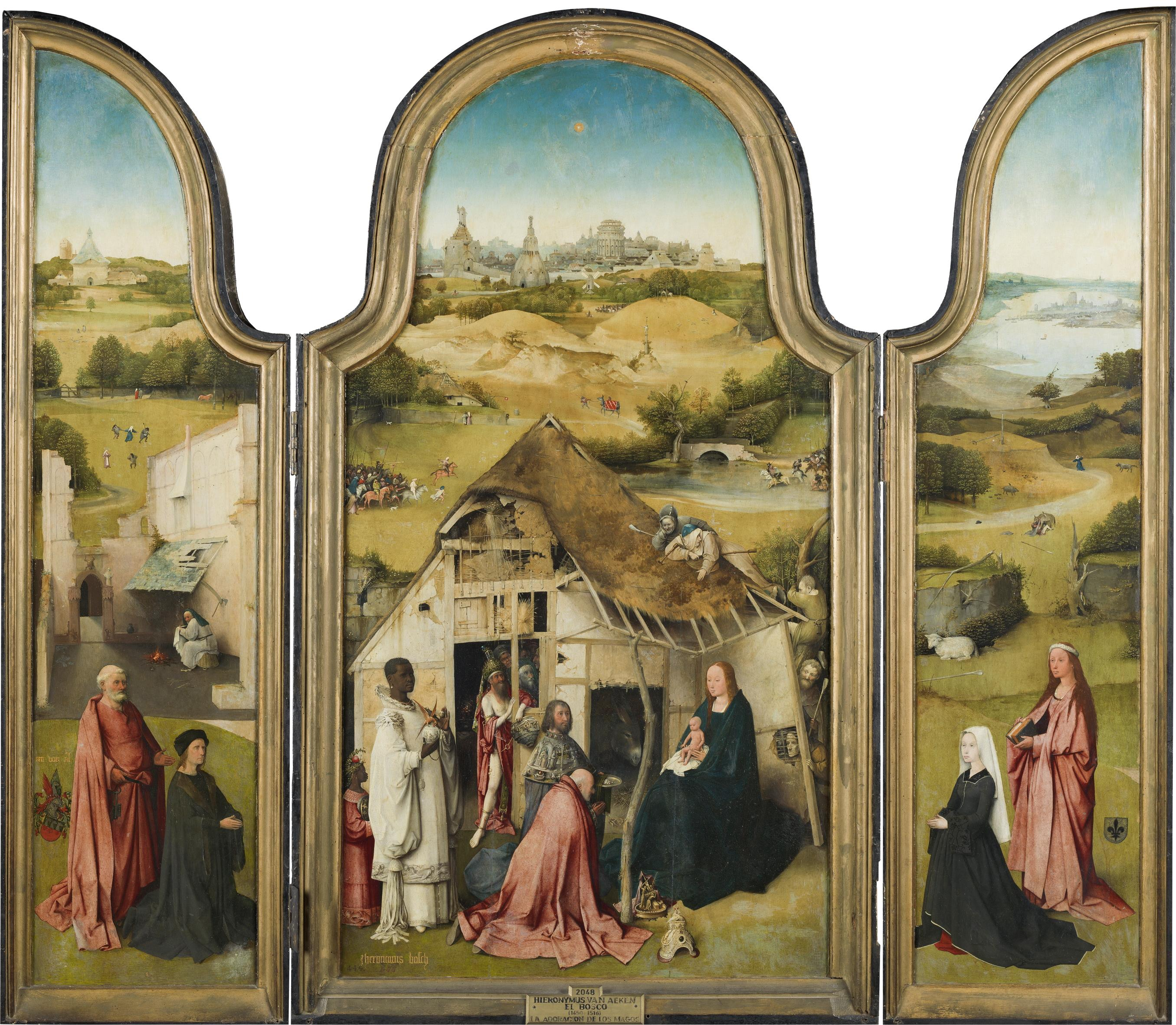
Adoration of the Magi by Hieronymus Bosch, with the infant Christ being shadowed by the Jewish "false Messiah", who is seen half-naked wearing a pointed cap in the stable doorway

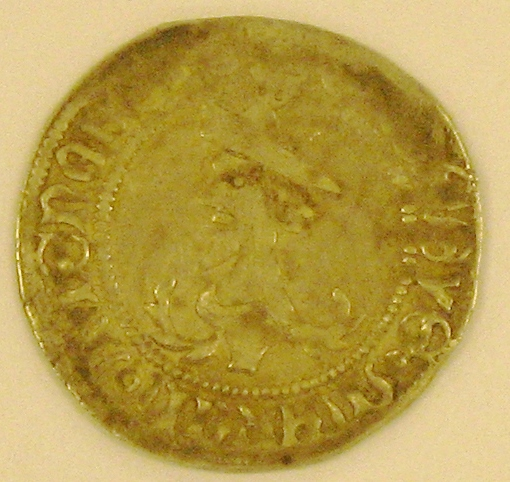
Judenkopf Groschen

== See also ==
- Conical hat
- Court Jew
- Dhimmi laws
- Ethnic segregation
- Fulani hat
- Ghetto, Melah
- List of hat styles
- List of headgear
- Ottoman Millet system
- Tembel hat
- Yellow badge
- Clothing laws by country
- Witch hat

== Bibliography ==
Parts of this article are translated from de:Judenhut of 13 July 2005

- Lipton, Sara (1999). Images of intolerance: the representation of Jews and Judaism in the Bible moralisée. The S. Mark Taper Foundation imprint in Jewish studies. Berkeley: University of California Press. ISBN 978-0-520-21551-1.
- Lubrich, Naomi (2015). "The Wandering Hat: Iterations of the Medieval Jewish Pointed Cap". Jewish History. 29 (3/4): 203–244. doi:10.1007/s10835-015-9250-5. ISSN 0334-701X. JSTOR 24709777.
- Lubrich, Naomi, “From Judenhut to Zauberhut: A Jewish Sign Proliferates”, in: Asdiwal, 10, 2015, 136–162
- Piponnier, Françoise; Mane, Perrine (1997). Dress in the Middle Ages. New Haven: Yale University Press. ISBN 978-0-300-06906-8.
- Roth, Norman, "Was There a "Jewish Hat"?"
- Schreckenberg, Heinz (1996). The Jews in Christian art: an illustrated history. New York: Continuum. ISBN 978-0-8264-0936-2.
- Silverman, Eric (2013-01-01). A Cultural History of Jewish Dress. A&C Black. ISBN 978-1-84788-286-8.
- Straus, Raphael (1942). "The "Jewish Hat" as an Aspect of Social History". Jewish Social Studies. 4 (1): 59–72. ISSN 0021-6704. JSTOR 4615188.
