= Jacob Mantino ben Samuel =

Jewish-Italian physician (??–1549)

Jacob Mantino ben Samuel (also known as Mantinus) (died 1549) was a Jewish-Italian physician, translator, and scholar.

== Life ==
Mantino's parents—and perhaps himself—were natives of Tortosa, Spain, which place they left at the time of the banishment of the Jews from Spain (1492). Mantino studied medicine and philosophy at the universities of Padua and Bologna. Having graduated (it is not certain from which one), he established himself at the latter place, and devoted his hours of leisure to the translation of scientific works from Hebrew into Latin. By these translations he soon acquired a high reputation, and he was befriended by the highest dignitaries of the court of Pope Clement VII.

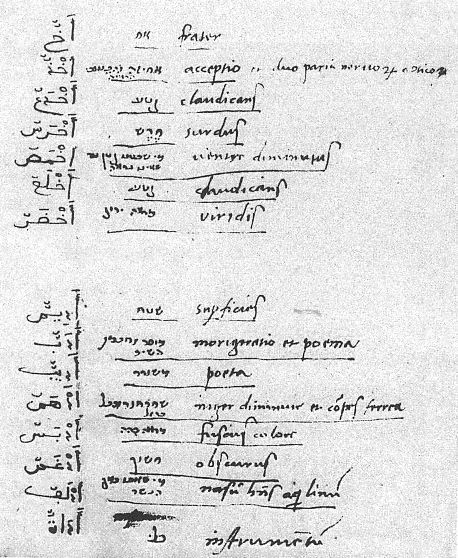
A page from 1524 Arabic-Hebrew-Latin dictionary by Jacob Mantino and Leo Africanus.

The war of 1527 compelled Mantino to leave the Pontifical States. He settled at Verona, where the new bishop, Gian Matteo Giberti, protected him. In 1528, when Giberti left Verona for Rome, Mantino decided to settle at Venice, where the Council of Ten exempted him from wearing the Judenhut. This privilege was granted him, at first for a term of several months, upon the recommendation of the French and English ambassadors, the papal legate, and other dignitaries whom he numbered among his patients. At the expiration of the prescribed term Mantino found an influential protector in another of his patients, Teodoro Trivulzio, marshal of France and governor of Genoa; the latter, urging his own services to the Venetian Republic, insisted that the council should make the exemption perpetual.

The efforts of Henry VIII of England to annul the marriage with his wife Catherine involved Mantino. Building his case on the pretext that the marriage was contrary to the Biblical law, and that the dispensation obtained from Pope Julius II was invalid, Henry sent Richard Croke to Italy in order to obtain opinions favorable to his case, that will enable to relieve him from levirate duties. Croke addressed himself to Jewish as well as to Christian scholars. Pope Clement VII, in his turn, consulted Mantino, who decided against Henry. This decision created for Mantino many enemies in Venice, where Croke had won a favorable opinion from the famous physician and scholar Elijah Menahem Halfon, among others.

Meanwhile, the Messianic dreamer Solomon Molcho, whom Mantino had energetically opposed while he was in Venice, went to Rome, followed by Mantino. Having many friends and protectors at the court of Clement VII, Mantino soon acquired great influence in Rome, which he employed in crushing Molcho. Mantino attained the zenith of his influence at the accession to the throne of Pope Paul III (1534), who appointed him his physician. This high position did not prevent Mantino from concerning himself with the affairs of the Jewish community of Rome, in whose records he appears as a member of the rabbinate, with the title "gaon." In 1544, for some unknown reason, Mantino returned to Venice, where again he was exempted from wearing the Jews' hat. Five years later he accompanied, as physician, the Venetian ambassador to Damascus, where he died soon after his arrival.

== Writings ==
Mantino translated philosophical and medical text mainly of the Aristotelian tradition, on which he worked since the early 1520s. The books were dedicated to a few different patrons, but at least some dedications imply that choices of material were Mantino's. Some translations had first been printed separately, and others shortly after his death, along with republications of the early editions, in a 11-volume edition of Aristotle and Averroes, the most complete one of its time (Guinta brothers=Iuntas, Venice, 1550-1552).

Mantino expressly worked from earlier translations, from Arabic to Hebrew, that were made in the preceding centuries by Jewish scholars, although he never cited them by name. Abraham de Balmes was another important and posthumous Jewish contributor to the Giunta edition, and shortly before them Elia del Medigo made some translations into Latin. But Greek manuscripts of Aristotle's works have since been discovered and independently translated in Italy, and the texts could now be compared with Averroes' citations. This revealed that Averroes' ideas were quite removed from the original, and that his citations were corrupt (as the transmission of Aristotle to Arabic was the result of a chain with two major translations).

Mantino was among those who tried to reconcile Averroes' citations and interpretations, with the Greek Aristotle, by "fixing" and expanding the text. The editors of the Giunta edition favored this interpretative approach over the philological-humanist approach, that tended to canonize the Greek sources and dismiss the contribution of medieval commentators such as Averroes. Mantino, however, took a moderate position, and translated in a semi-humanistic style. He explained, in one of his dedications, that Averroes has been misunderstood and attacked due to "barbarous", strictly literal, medieval Latin translations. Overall, the efforts did not impress later readers however; the interest in Averroism as a systematic philosophical school dwindled shortly after the two Giunta editions.

- Of the commentaries by Averroes:

- Paraphrasis Auerrois Cordubensis philosophorum facile: principis: de partibus & generatione animalium ... (in Latin). [Rome]: per magistrum Marcelum Silber alis Franck. 1521. [Paraphrase on "Parts of Animals" and "Generation of Animals"] (dedicated to Pope Leo X)

- [Gersonides' supercommentary: Mantino noted at the end of this edition that he translated that too, but no edition of it is known].

- Auerois Paraphrasis super libros de republica Platonis, nunc primùm latinitate donata, Iacob Mantino medico Hebraeo interprete [Paraphrase of Plato's "Republic"]. Impressum Romae in Campo Florae: Per M. Valerium Doric. & Ludouicum, fratres brixianos. 1539. (Dedicated to Pope Paul III, 1st edition Rome 1539; reprinted by Giunta, 1550/2)
- Auerroys Epithoma totius Methaphisices Aristotelis in quattuor secatum tractatus... (in Latin). Bononiae: ... Benedicti Hectoris bibliopolae. 1523. [epitome (=compendium) of Aristotle's "Metaphysics"] (Dedicated to Ercole Gonzaga) (Reprinted by Giunta, vol. 8, pp. 168ff)
- the middle commentaries on parts of the medieval "Organon" (Venice, 1550):

- Porphyry's "Isagoge"
- Aristotle's: "Categories",
- "On Interpretation" (books I-IV)
- "Topics",
- "Posterior Aanalytics"

- the long commentary on "Posterior Analytics" (book I, 1-150) [Being incomplete, it was combined with other translations in Giunta 1550, and printed alongside them in the 1562 edition.]

- "Poetics"
- Supercommentaries of Gersonides on Averroes’s middle commentaries on "Isagoge", "Categories", and "On Interpretation"

- proem to book XII of Aristotle's "Metaphysics" (Giunta, vol. 8, pp. 135ff)
- the middle commentary on Aristotle's "Physics" (books I-III)

- the proem to the long commentary on Aristotle's "Physics"

- the middle commentary on Aristotle’s "On the soul"

- the long commentary on Aristotle's "On the soul", book III, chapters 5, 36. (1521 and in Giunta 1550/2)

He also translated:

- Averroes' medical work "Colliget" ("Kullayot")
- Avicenna:

- Auicennae Quarta fen primi libri de uniuersali ratione medendi: nunc primu m. M. Iacob Mantini medici hebrei: opera latinitate donata (in Latin). Venice: Impressum Venetiis expèsis nobilis uiri Luveantonii Iunta florẽtini. 1530. [Book IV, fen 1, of The Canon of Medicine] (quickly followed by printings in Ettlingen OCLC 1532094844, Haguenau OCLC 28272927, Paris OCLC 14324464)
- idem, idem, chapter 3.1.29: printed in Baersdorp, Corneille van (1538). Methodus universae artis medicae formulis expressa ex gal. traditionibus scopos omnes curantibus necessarios demonstrans in partes quinque disecta ... Brugis: Excudebat Hubertus Crocus. OCLC 978631016.
- idem, idem, Book I, fen 1: Auicennae primi libri Fen prima nunc primum per magistrum Jacobum Mantimam [sic] ... / ex hebraico in latinum translata (in Latin). Venice?: [S.n.] c. 1540. (OCLC 955771012; OCLC 861635119)

- Maimonides:

- Praefatio Rabi Moysis Maimonidis in aeditionem moralem seniorum Massecheth Avoth apud Hebreos nuncupatam octoque amplectens capita. Bononiae: Benedictis. 1526. OCLC 165572669. ["The Eight Chapters"- the preface to the Tractate Avot in Maimonides' Commentary of the Mishnah] (Dedicated to Ercole Gonzaga)
- rabi mossei aegyptij dux seu director dubita[n]tium aut perplexorum: in treis libros diuisus. Bade. 1520. [The first complete Latin edition of the Guide for the Perplexed ("Moreh Nebukhim"), published by Augustinus Justinianus. Attributed to Mantino but not credited.]

- Samuel Ibn Tibbon:

- Libri quarti meteorologicon summula Samuelis Tabonidis ... ex verbis Aristo. et Auer. expositione compacta: interprete eximio Artivm et Medicinae Doctorae M. Iacob Man. Hebreo. 1523. CNCE 37362. [A short tract, apparently from Otot Ha-Shamayim, book IV (On which see Fontaine:), but is absent from bibliographies.] (Dedicated to Ercole Gonzaga)
