= Elijah Menahem Halfon =

Personal life
- Died: 16th century
- Parent: Abba Mari Halfon (father)
- Occupation: Rabbi, physician, poet

Religious life
- Religion: Judaism

Elijah Menahem Halfon (Hebrew: אליה מנחם חלפן; fl. 16th century) was a Venetian rabbi, Talmudic scholar, physician, and poet.

== Biography ==
Elijah Menahem Halfon was born into a distinguished rabbinic family. He was the son of astronomer Abba Mari Halfon, grandson of Rabbi Joseph Colon, and son-in-law of Kalonymus ben David, also known as Maestro Calo, who had translated Averroes' works into Latin.

Halfon was a practicing physician, and treated members of the Venetian elite. Among his notable patients was the wife of Pietro Aretino. At the same time, he became one of the Venetian Ghetto's foremost scholars, known for his expertise in Kabbalah, Talmud, and Jewish law. He also authored responsa and poetry, some of which survive in manuscript collections.

One of Halfon's responsa, preserved in a collection compiled by Joseph Graziano of Modena, addressed whether Jews were permitted to teach Hebrew to Christians. His opinion, issued in Venice in 1544, argued that elementary instruction in Hebrew was permissible, especially to enable non-Jews to fulfill the Seven Noahide Laws. He noted that allowing non-Jews access to the Tanakh in its original language could prevent distortions spread by converts who mistranslated the text for polemical purposes. However, he warned against teaching the oral tradition, including Kabbalah, to non-Jews.

Halfon's friendship with the messianic figure Solomon Molcho put him at odds with fellow Venetian physician and rabbinic scholar Jacob Mantino.

== Role in Henry VIII's divorce case ==
Halfon was consulted during King Henry VIII's attempt to annul his marriage to Catherine of Aragon, widow of his elder brother Arthur. After Pope Clement VII refused the annulment in 1527, English diplomat Richard Croke was sent to Venice to solicit rabbinic support for his interpretation of biblical passages regarding marriage to a brother's widow. Halfon, alongside the convert Marco Raphael, provided opinions asserting that since Henry was not a Jew, Leviticus 20:21, which prohibits a man from marrying his brother's widow, overrode the levirate law in Deuteronomy 25:5–6, thus supporting Henry's claim that his marriage to Catherine was invalid. Halfon also secured signatures from other Italian rabbis to bolster the English case.

This stance put him in direct opposition to his professional rival Jacob Mantino, who sided with the papal view that Henry's marriage was valid.
