= Yehiel Nissim da Pisa =

- Born: 1507; Pisa
- Died: 1574
- Occupation: Rabbi

Yehiel Nissim da Pisa (Vitale) (1507–1574) was an Italian-Jewish banker, writer, and philosopher, who wrote a treatise on the use of credit, Ma'amar ḥayei olam at inyan haribit, as well as several texts on philosophy, usury and loans. His works were not published at the time, but circulated as manuscripts, only to be published much later. He describes the use of bills of exchange in Haye Olam which translates as Eternal Life.

== Biography ==
His family operated a pawnshop and loan-banking business in Florence. His grandfather was Jehiel of Pisa. He became a friend and associate of Lorenzo de Medici.

After the licenses for Jews to operate the family's businesses were revoked by the Florentine government, he became a scholar and a kabbalistic authority.

In his philosophic works, he was critical of Aristotelianism, Gersonides and Maimonides, preferring anti-rationalism, arguing that the kabbalah, Torah and Jewish tradition were self-sufficient sources of knowledge, and emphasized the uniqueness and spirituality of the Jewish people. He cited the Zohar, Judah Halevi and Nahmanides, Averroes, particularly his commentary on Aristotle's Physics, and Agostino Nifo. His work addresses the Jewish view of usury.

Yehiel Nissim drew on his experience from the early years of the Counter-Reformation, during which there was a credit crisis, subjecting the system to extensive limitations. He writes that in Italy, the practice of credit was more widespread than the rest of the Jewish diaspora, that Jewish loan-banking companies had found the ideal conditions for them to prosper, and that important groups of Italian Jews had formed around that industry.
