= Fulani hat =

West African conical fiber and leather hat

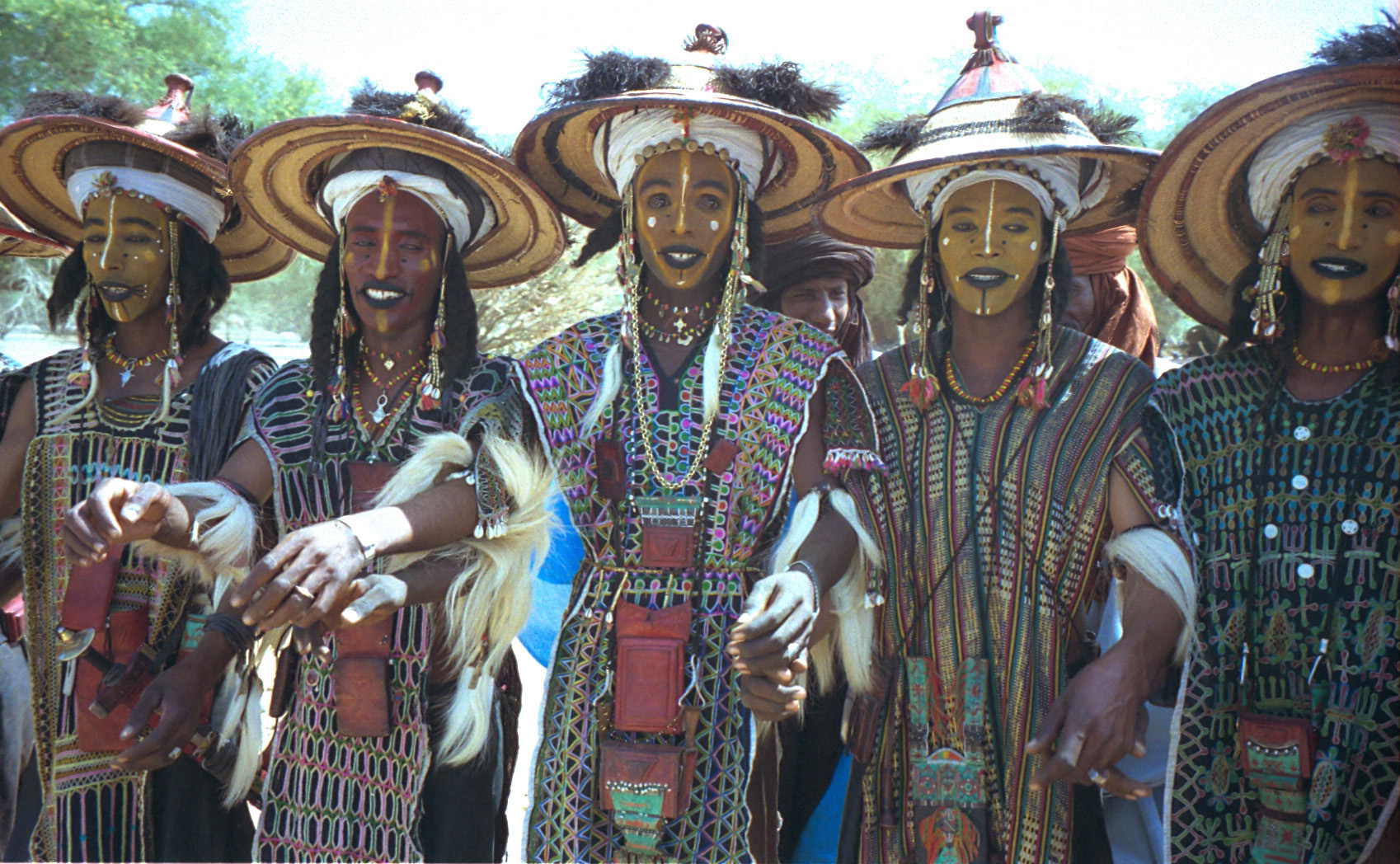
Yaake dance of the Wodaabe, Niger 1997

The Fulani hat is a conical fiber hat with leather applications that comes from the Fulani people in West Africa. It is typically worn by the Wodaabe, a nomadic cattle-herder subgroup of the Fulani. This hat is often worn above a turban.

In general, a Fulani hat is a basketry hat made of plant fibers. It is covered in leather both at the brim and top and sometimes with decorative leather elements in the middle. At the very top of the hat there is a knob which is covered in leather. At the base of the hat there is often a chinstrap with a tassel at the end.

The hats were featured on dancers in the 2018 music video All the Stars by the artist Kendrick Lamar.

There are some striking similarities between the Fulani hat and the medieval Jewish hat, even though there is no known connection between the two.

== Gallery ==
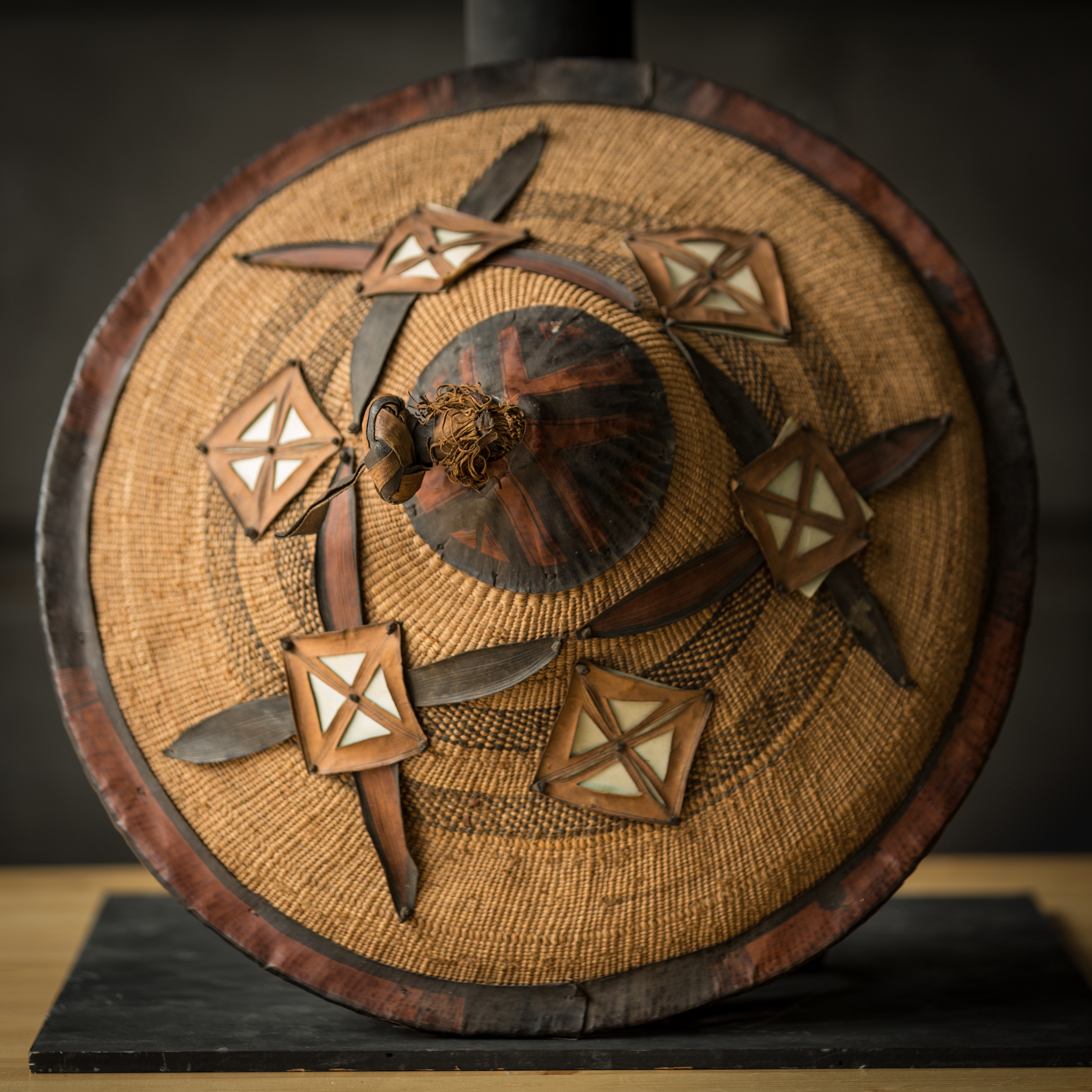

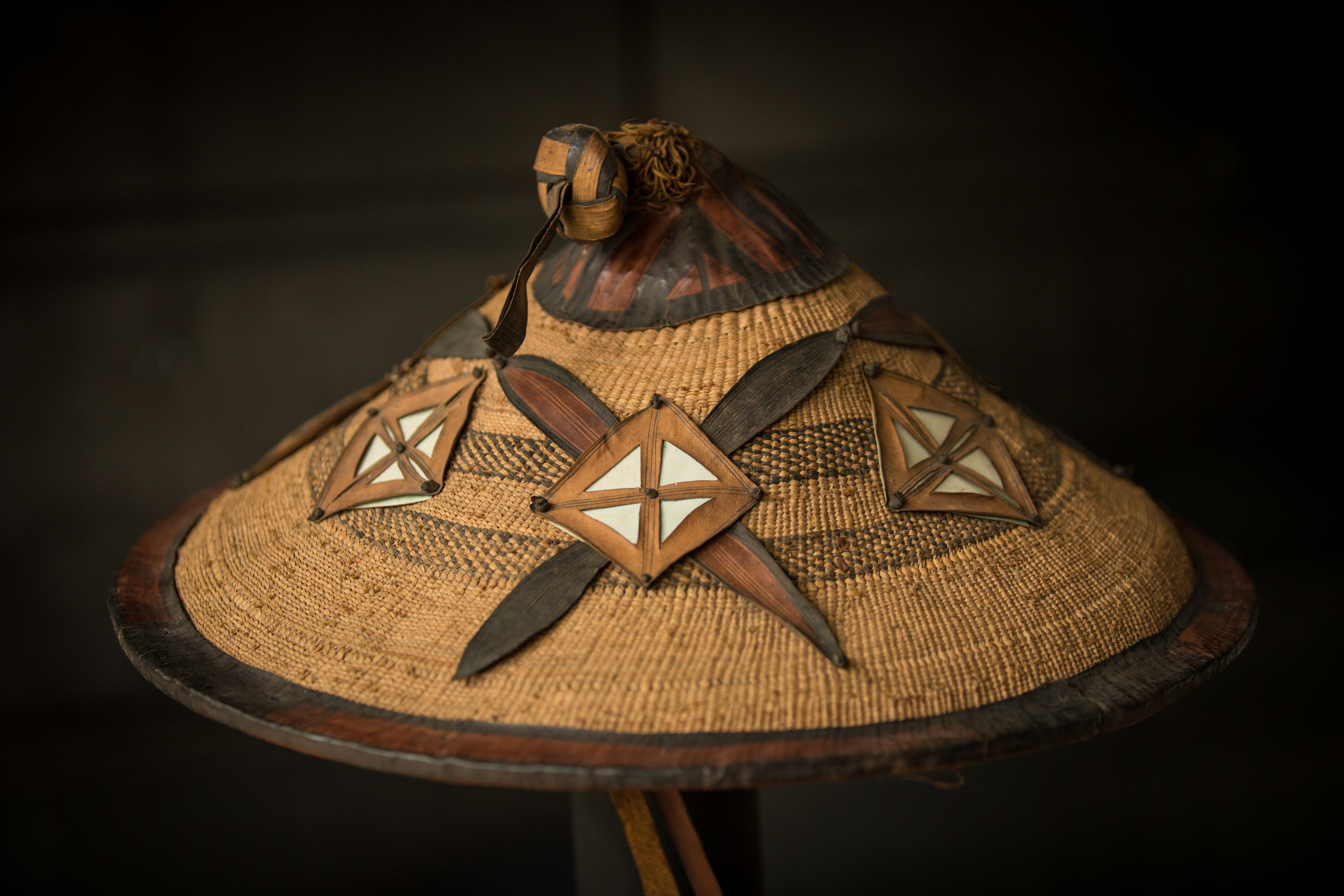

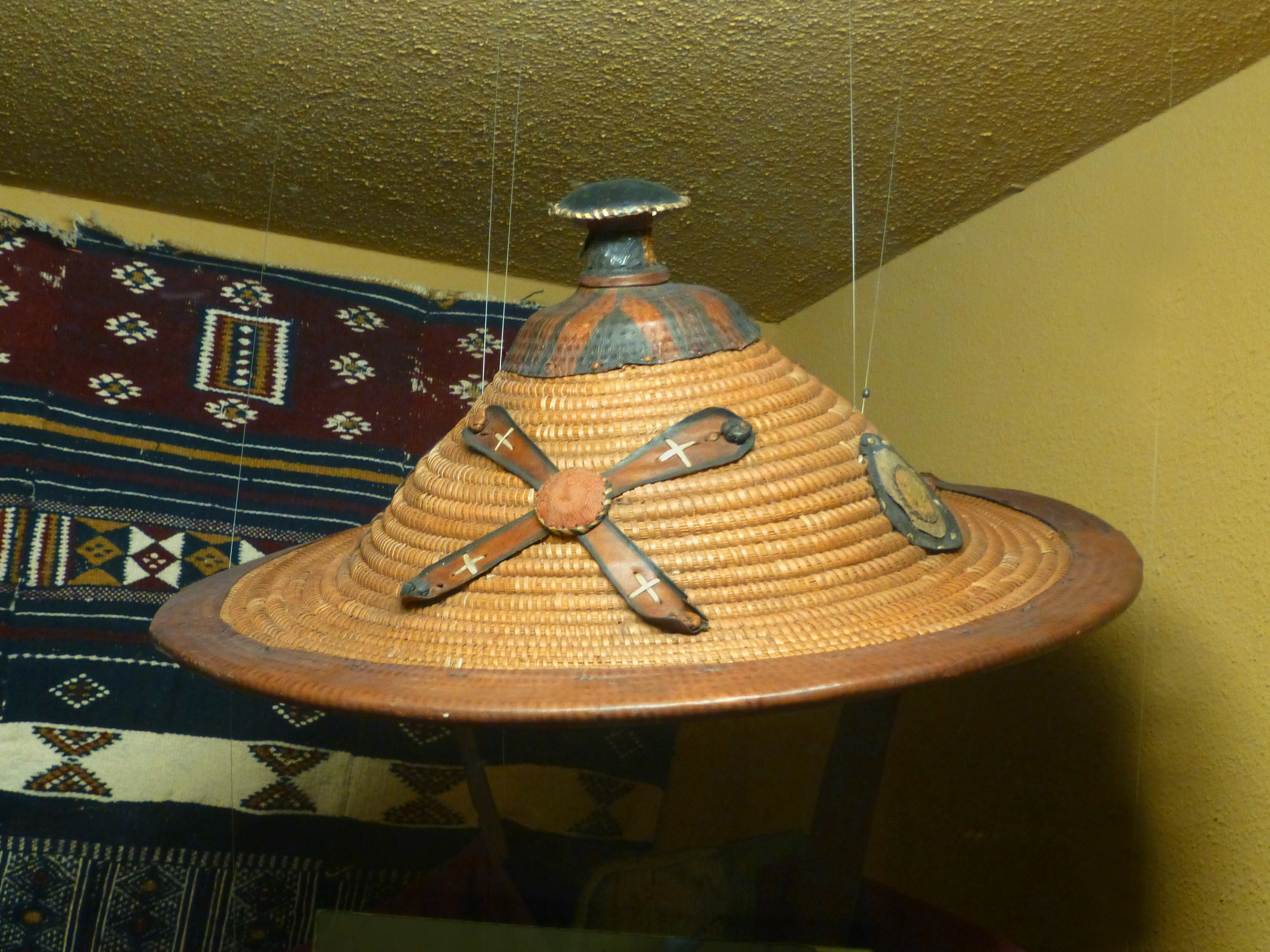

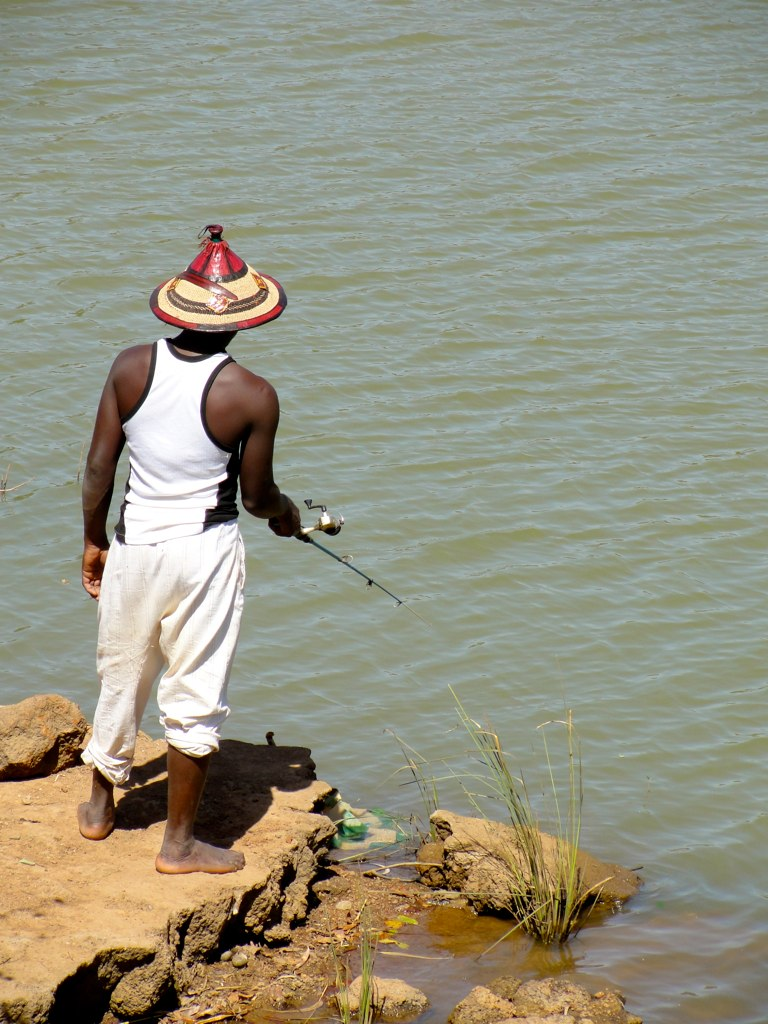

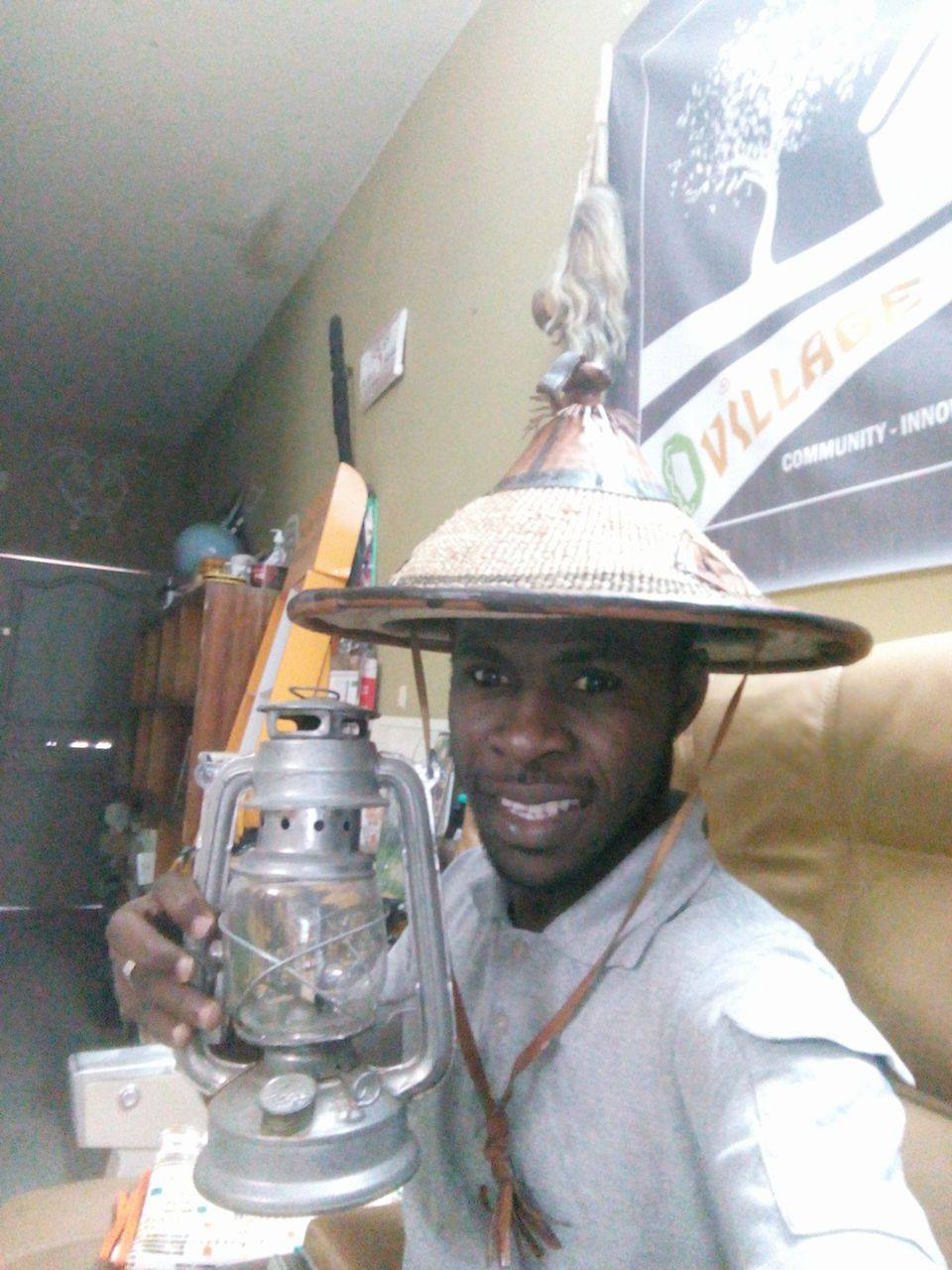

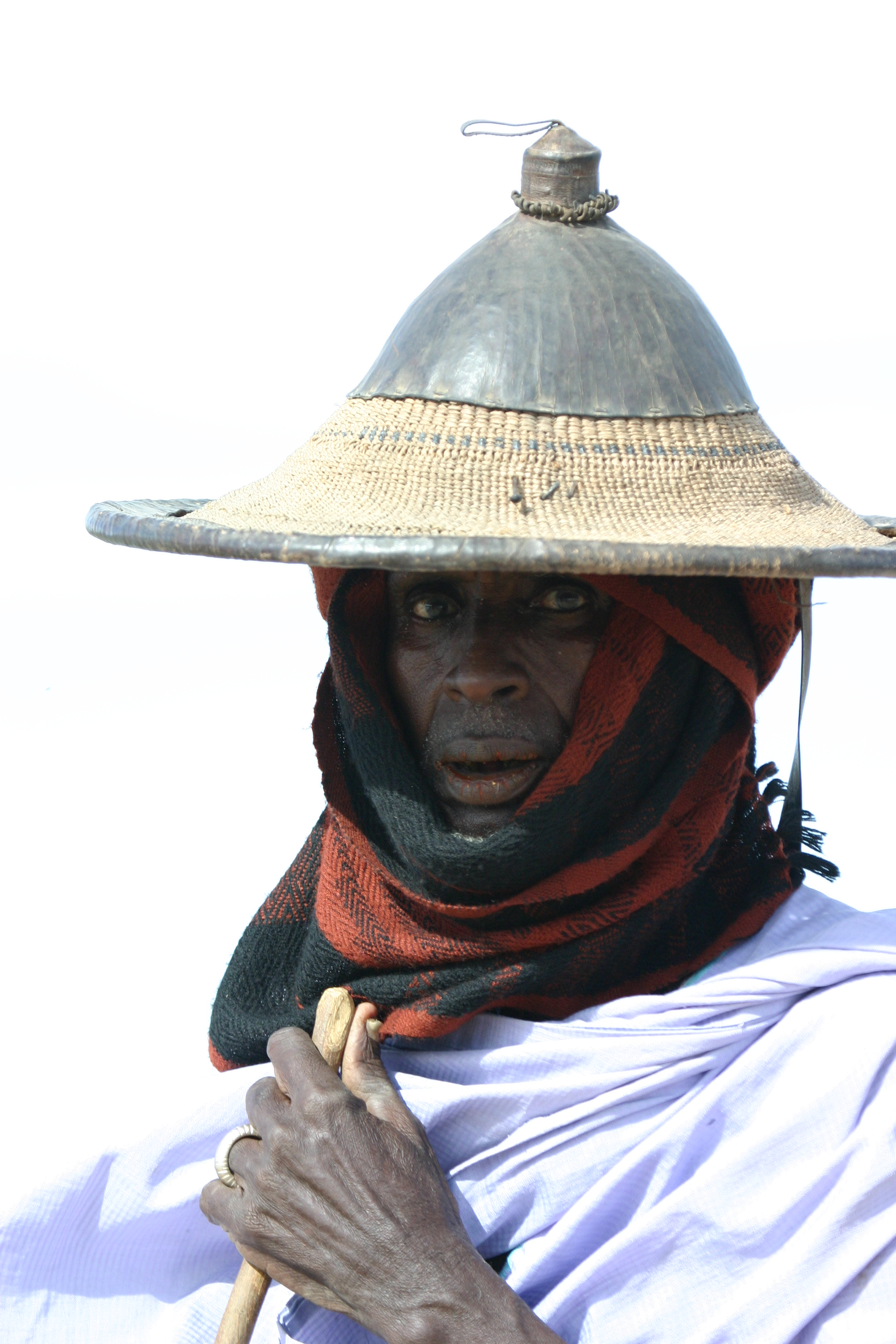

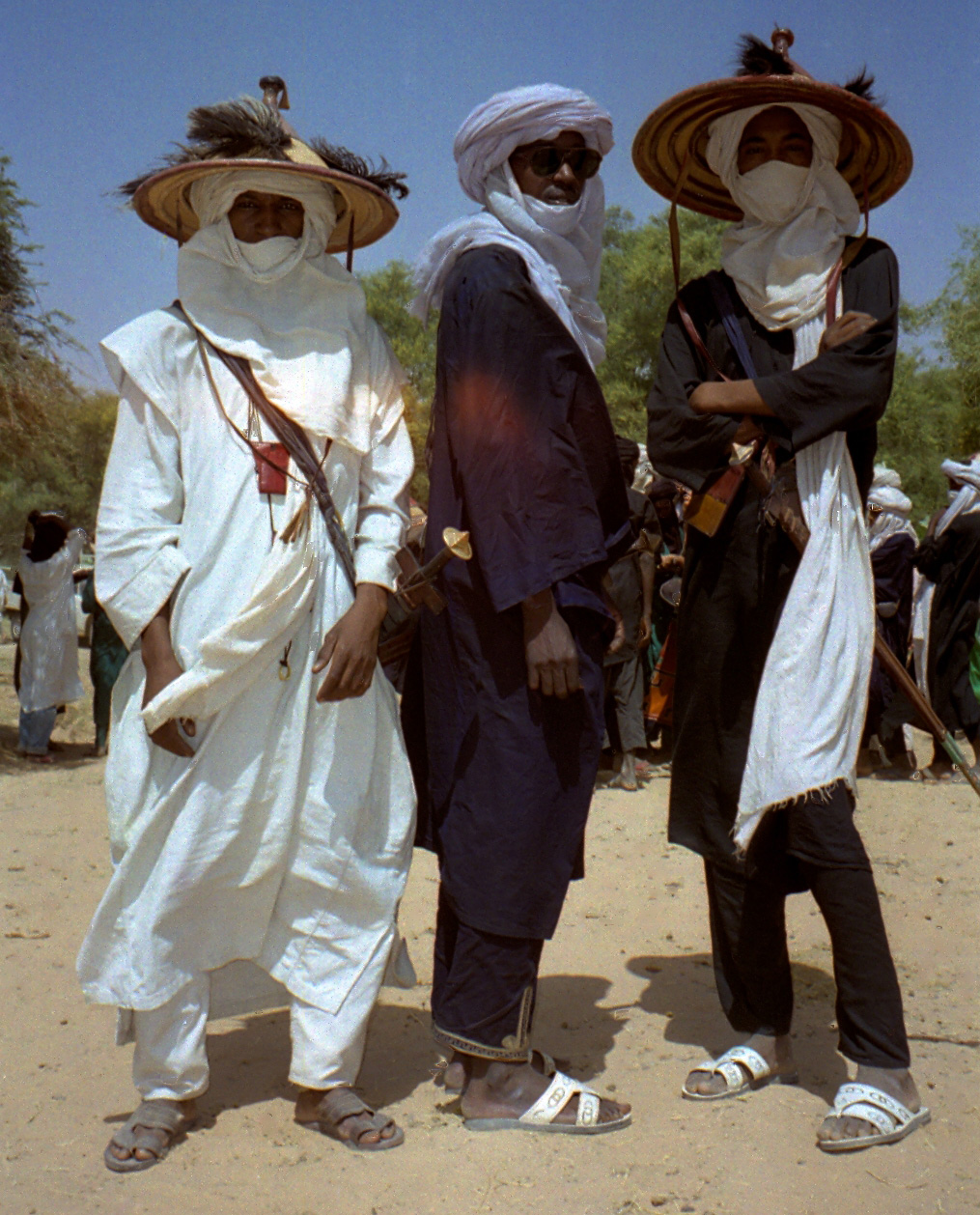

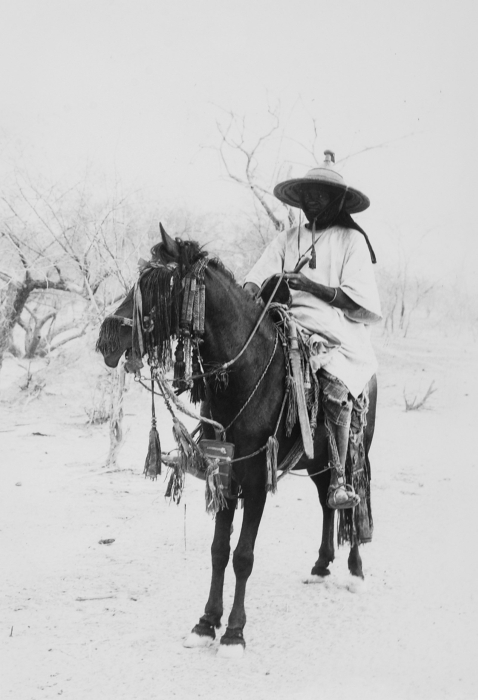

== See also ==
- List of hat styles
- Asian conical hat
- Jewish hat
- Salakot
