= Kalfon =

Halfon or Khalfon (Hebrew: כלפון) is a Hebrew surname. Notable people with the surname include:

- Abraham Khalfon (1741–1819), Sephardi Jewish community leader, historian, scholar, and paytan in Libya
- Avraham Kalfon (1900–1983), Israeli politician
- François Kalfon
- Pierre Kalfon
- Yomtob Kalfon

== See also ==
- Halfon
