= Jehiel ben Samuel Pisa =

Italian philanthropist

Jehiel of Pisa (died February 10, 1492) was a philanthropist and scholar of Pisa.

== Biography ==
The wealth he had acquired in the banking business he spent liberally for charitable purposes. Himself a scholar, he extended his protection to Jewish learning. Johanan Alemanno, the teacher of Pico di Mirandola, seems to have lived for years in Jehiel's house. Jehiel was on intimate terms with Don Isaac Abravanel, with whom he carried on a correspondence. In 1472 Abravanel induced Lopo de Almeida and the physician Joao Sezira, Alfonso's ambassadors to the pope, to pay Jehiel a visit. They carried costly presents to Jehiel's wife from Abravanel, and valuable manuscripts, among which were copies of Abravanel's own works, to Jehiel.

The end of Jehiel's life was embittered by the apostasy of one of his daughters. On that occasion Abravanel wrote him a letter of consolation, in which he reminded him of the saying of the Rabbis (M. Ḳ. 20b) that the result of education is not dependent upon the merits of the parents: thorns grow in every field among the ears of corn.

Gedaliah ibn Yaḥya relates that most of Jehiel's fortune was spent in aiding the refugees of Spain. Jehiel's death was bewailed by the poets and writers of his time, such as Eliezer Ezra of Volterra, Solomon of Camerino, and the astronomer Abba Mari Ḥalfon.

He is the grandfather of Yehiel Nissim da Pisa.

== Jewish Encyclopedia bibliography ==
- Oẓar Neḥmad, ed. Blumenfeld, ii. 65 et seq.;
- Grätz, Gesch. viii. 239;
- D. Kaufmann, in R. E. J. xxvi. 84.
