= Abba Mari Halfon =

- Occupations: Astronomer, writer, poet
- Children: Elijah Menahem Halfon
- Scientific career
- Fields: Astronomy

Abba Mari Halfon (Hebrew: אבא מרי חלפן; fl. 15th–16th centuries) was an Italian-Jewish astronomer. He was the father of rabbi Elijah Menahem Halfon.

In 1492, Halfon was in Naples, where he studied astronomy. His principal work, Ta‘ame Mitzvot, contains explanatory notes on the Alfonsine Tables, a set of astronomical tables compiled in thirteenth-century Spain. The text survives in manuscript form, including copies in the Biblioteca Nazionale, Naples, and in the De Rossi collection in Parma.

According to historian Abraham Berliner, Halfon was also responsible for the Hebrew version of Bayit Ne’eman, a translation or paraphrase of a commentary by the Arabic scholar Ibn Rajal on the Alfonsine Tables. This work, preserved in the Naples codex, includes a Hebrew introductory poem and bears the initials אמ״ת ("Abba Mari Talmid"), the same signature found in Ta‘ame Mitzvot.

In addition to his scientific writings, Halfon composed poetry. An elegy he wrote in 1490 in Lucca upon the death of Jehiel of Pisa was later published by David Kaufmann in the Revue des études juives.
