= List of works by Averroes =

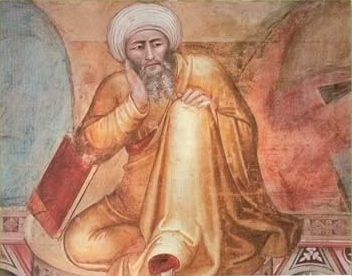
Ibn Rushd was the preeminent philosopher in the history of Al-Andalus.

According to a chronology over Averroes’ writings by Joseph Kenny OP, Averroes first writings date from his age of 31 (year 1157).

The following is a bibliography of Averroes' works.

== Law ==
- Bidayatul Mujtahid (The Distinguished Jurist's Primer) - A treatise on comparative sharia.
  - English Translation published by Garnet Publishing in 2 volumes
- Fasl Al Maqal fi ma bayn al-Hikma wa al-Shariah min Ittisal (On the Harmony of Religion and Philosophy) - An inquiry into the position of the sharia on philosophy.

== Medicine ==
- Colliget
- A compilation of the works of Galen.
- A commentary on the Canon of Medicine of Avicenna.

== Logic ==
=== Short Commentary ===
- [1] Short Commentary on Aristotle's Organon / Epitome in Libros Logicæ Aristotelis, Arabic: تجريد الأقاويل الضرورية من صناعة المنطق, romanized: Tajrīd al-ʾaqāwīl al-ḍarūriyya min ṣināʿat al-manṭiq, lit. 'Extracting the essential statements from the science of logic', c. 1157

=== Middle Commentaries ===
- [2] Middle Commentary on the Isagoge, تلخيص مدخل فرفوريوس
- [3] Middle Commentary on the Categories, تلخيص كتاب المقولات
- [4] Middle Commentary on On Interpretation, تلخيص كتاب العبارة
- [5] Middle Commentary on the Prior Analytics, Media Expositio in Libros Priorum Resolutoriorum, تلخيص كتاب القياس
- [6] Middle Commentary on the Posterior Analytics, Media Expositio in Libros Posteriorum Resolutoriorum, تلخيص كتاب البرهان
- [7] Middle Commentary on the Topics, تلخيص كتاب الجدل
- [8] Middle Commentary on the Sophistical Refutations, تلخيص كتاب السفسطة
- [9] Middle Commentary on the Rhetoric, تلخيص كتاب الخطابة, 1175 or 1176
- [10] Middle Commentary on the Poetics, تلخيص كتاب الشعر

=== Long Commentaries ===
- [11] Long Commentary on the Prior Analytics (?) / Šarḥ kitāb al-qiyās li-ʾArisṭūṭālīs (Aka: Kitāb šarḥ kitāb al-qiyās li-ʾArisṭū) شرح كتاب القياس لارسطاطاليس، كتاب شرح كتاب القياس لارسطو
- [12] Long Commentary on the Posterior Analytics / Šarḥ kitāb al-burhān شرح كتاب البرهان

=== Questions ===
- [13] Questions on Logic / Quæsita in libros logicæ Aristotelis / (Part of: Masāʿil fī l-ḥikma, aka: Muqaddimāt fī l-ḥikma) مسائل في الحكمة، مقدمة في الحكمة

==== Questions on the Isagoge ====
- [13.1] On Alfarabi on the Isagoge about genus and differentia / Kalām ʿalā qawl ʾAbī Naṣr fī l-madḫal wa-l-jins wa-l-faṣl yuštarikān كلام على قول ابي نصر في المدخل و الجنس و الفصل يشتركان

==== Questions on the Categories ====
- [13.2] On substantial and accidental universals / Al-qawl fī kullīyāt al-jawhar wa-kullīyāt al-ʾaʿraḍ (Aka: Bāb ʿalā maqūla ʾawwal kitāb ʾAbī Naṣr (?), Maqāla ʿalā ʾawwal maqūla ʾAbī Naṣr (?)) القول في كليات الجواهر و كليات الاعراض، باب على مقولة اول كتاب ابي نصر، مقالة على اول مقولة ابي نصر

==== Questions on Peri hermeneias ====
- [13.3] On the copula and on derived nouns / Maqāla fī l-kalima wa-l-ism al-muštaqq (Aka: Kalām lahū ʿalā l-kalima wa-l-ism al-muštaqq, Min kitāb al-ʿibāra li-ʾAbī Naṣr) مقالة في الكلمة و الاسم المشتق، كلام له على الكلمة و الاسم المشتق، من كتاب العبارة لابي نصر
- [13.4] On compound and simple predicates / Min kitāb al-ʿibāra (Aka: De prædicatis compositis et divisis) من كتاب العبارة

==== Questions on the Prior Analytics ====
- [13.5] On the definition: Critique of the positions of Alexander and Alfarabi / Al-qawl fī l-ḥadd wa-naqd mā ḏahaba ʾilayhī al-ʾIskandar wa-ʾAbū Naṣr (Aka: Maqāla fī l-ḥadd (juzʾ al-qiyās) wa-naqd maḏahabay al-ʾIskandar wa-ʾAbī Naṣr; De definitione termini) القول في الحد و نقد ما ذهب اليه الاسكندر و ابو نصر، مقالة في الحد جزء القياس و نقد ما ذهب اليه الاسكندر و ابي نصر
- [13.6] Critique of Avicenna's position on the conversion of premises / Naqd maḏhab Ibn Sīnā fī inʿikās al-qaḍāyā (Aka: Maqāla fī naqd maḏhab Ibn Sīnā fī ʿaks al-qaḍāyā; De conversionibus) نقد مذهب ابن سيناء في انعكاس القضايا، مقالة في نقد مذهب ابن سيناء في عكس القضايا
- [13.7] Critique of Themistius's position on the contingent syllogisms in the first and second figure / Naqd maḏhab Tāmisṭiyūs fī l-maqāyīs al-mumkina fī l-šaklayn al-ʾawwal wa-l-ṯānī (Aka: De conditione syllogismorum contingentium circa duo eorum attributa, videlicet de numerositate illationis, et de figura in qua non concludunt) نقد مذهب تامسطيوس في المقاييس الممكنة في الشكلين الاول و الثاني
- [13.8] Chapter on absolute premises / Maqāla fī l-muqaddima al-muṭlaqa (Aka: Quid sit propositio absoluta id est de inesse) مقالة في المقدمة المطلقة
- [13.9] On the types of conclusions in compound syllogisms / Al-qawl fī jihāt al-natāʾij fī l-maqāyīs al-murakkaba wa-fī maʿnā al-maqūl ʿalā l-kull القول في جهات نتائج في المقاييس المركبة و في معنى المقول على الكل
- [13.10] Chapter on the dependency of the types of conclusions from the types of premises / Maqāla [...] fī luzūm jihāt al-natāʾij li-jihāt al-muqaddimāt مقالة في لزوم جهات النتائج لجهات المقدمات
- [13.11] On the mixing of contingent and necessary premises / De mistione contingentis et necessarii
- [13.12] Chapter on the dependency of the conclusions from mixed syllogisms
- [13.13] Chapter on the meaning of "predicated on everything" / Maqāla [...] fī maʿnā al- maqūl ʿalā l-kull wa-ġayr ḏālika مقالة في معنى المقول على الكل و غير ذلك
- [13.14] Chapter on conditional syllogisms / Maqāla fī l-maqāʾis al-šarṭīya (Aka: Maqāla fī l-qiyās; De conditionali, an per ipsum ostendatur quæsitum primum ignotum) مقالة في القياس
- [13.15] Exposition of Alfarabi's commentary on the first book of the Prior Analytics / Talḫīṣ šarḥ ʾAbī Naṣr [li-]l-maqāla al-ʾūlā min al-qiyās li-l-ḥakīm... تلخيص شرح ابي نصر للمقالة الاولة من القياس للحكيم

==== Questions on the Posterior Analytics ====
- [13.16] On the predicates in demonstrations / Al-qawl fī l-maḥmūlāt al-barāhīn (Aka: Epistola de primitate prædicatorum in demonstrationibus) القول في المحمولات البراهين
- [13.17] On Alfarabi's Book on Demonstration / Min kitāb al-burhān li-ʾAbī Naṣr من كتاب البرهان لابي نصر
- [13.18] On the definition of individuals / Al-qawl fī ḥadd al-šaḫṣ (Aka: An definitio sit particularis aut universalis tantum) القول في الحد الشخص
- [13.19] On the three types of definition in relation to demonstrations / De triplici genere diffinitionum in ordine ad demonstrationem
- [13.20] On whether the middle term is the cause of the major term / De medio demonstrationis an sit causa maioris extremi
- [13.21] Treatise on the disagreement of Alfarabi and Aristotle on the order of the Posterior Analytics and the rules of demonstrations and definitions / Kitāb fī mā ḫālafa ʾAbū Naṣr li-ʾArisṭū fī kitāb al-burhān min tartībihī wa-qawānīn al-barāhīn wa-l-ḥudūd (Aka: De conditionibus præmissarum demonstrationis) كتاب في ما خالف ابو نصر لارسطو في كتاب البرهان من ترتيبه و قوانين البراهين و الحدود
- [13.22] On the conditions for the necessity of the premises of demonstrations / De conditionibus quæ requiruntur ad necessitatem præmissarum demonstrationum
- [13.23] On how a demonstration can be transferred from one science to another / Quomodo fiat translatio ab una arte in aliam
- [13.24] On demonstrations quia / De demonstrationibus quia
- [13.25] On the sense in which the definition is better known than the thing defined / Quomodo definitio sit notior ipso definito
- [13.26] On the definitions which are said to differ from demonstrations in their order / De definitionibus quæ dicuntur positione differentes a demonstratione

== Philosophy of Nature ==
=== Physics ===
- [14] Short Commentary on the Physics / Jawāmiʿ al-samāʿ al-ṭabīʿī (Part of: Al-jawāmiʿ fī l-falsafa; Jawāmiʿ kutub ʾArisṭūṭālīs fī l-ṭabīʿīyāt wa-l-ʾilāhīyāt) جوامع السماع الطبيعي، جزء من الجوامع في الفلسفة، جوامع كتب ارسطاطاليس في الطبيعيات و الالهيات
- [15] Middle Commentary on the Physics / Talḫīṣ kitāb al-samāʿ al- al-ṭabīʿī (Aka: [...] li-ʾArisṭūṭālīs; Talḫīṣ al- ṭabīʿī; Wa-laḫaṣa kitāb al-samāʿ al-ṭabīʿī li-ʾArisṭūṭālīs) تلخيص كتاب السماع الطبيعي لارسطاطاليس، تلخيص الطبيعي،
- [16] Long Commentary on the Physics / Šarḥ [kitāb] al-samāʿ al-ṭabīʿī شرح كتاب السماع الطبيعي

=== On the Heavens ===
- [17] Short Commentary on De cælo / Jawāmiʿ al-samāʾ wa-l-ʿālam (Part of: Al-jawāmiʿ fī l-falsafa; Jawāmiʿ kutub ʾArisṭūṭālīs fī l-ṭabīʿīyāt wa-l-ʾilāhīyāt) جوامع السماء و العالم ، جزء من الجوامع في الفلسفة، جوامع كتب ارسطاطاليس في الطبيعيات و الالهيات
- [18] Middle Commentary on De cælo / Talḫīṣ [kitāb] al-samāʾ wa-l-ʿālam تلخيص كتاب السماء و العالم
- [19] Long Commentary on De cælo / Šarḥ kitāb al-samāʾ wa-l-ʿālam (Aka: Šarḥ kitāb al-samāʾ wa-l-ʿālam li-ʾArisṭūṭālīs; Šarḥ al-samāʾ wa-l-ʿālam) شرح كتاب السماء و العالم
- [20] De substantia orbis / Ma′amar be-etsem ha-galgal le-Ibn Rushd מאמר בעצם הגלגל לאבן רשד

=== On Generation and Corruption ===
- [21] Short Commentary on De generatione et corruptione / Jawāmiʿ kitāb al-kaun wa-l-fasād (Part of: Al-jawāmiʿ fī l-falsafa; Jawāmiʿ kutub ʾArisṭūṭālīs fī l-ṭabīʿīyāt wa-l-ʾilāhīyāt) جوامع كتاب الكون و الفساد
- [22] Middle Commentary on De generatione et corruptione / Talḫīṣ [kitāb] al-kaun wa-l-fasād تلخيص كتاب الكون و الفساد 567/1172

=== Meteorology ===
- [23] Short Commentary on the Meteorology / Jawāmiʿ kitāb al-ʾaṯār al-ʿulwīya (Part of: Al-jawāmiʿ fī l-falsafa; Jawāmiʿ kutub ʾArisṭūṭālīs fī l-ṭabīʿīyāt wa-l-ʾilāhīyāt) جوامع كتاب الآثار العلوية
- [24] Middle Commentary on the Meteorology / Talḫīṣ [kitāb] al-ʾāṯār al-ʿulwīya تلخيص كتاب الآثار العلوية

=== Biology ===
- [25] Middle(?) Commentary on De animalibus / Talḫīṣ tisʿ maqālāt min kitāb al-ḥayawān (Aka: Talḫīṣ tisʿ maqālāt min kitāb al-ḥayawān wa-ḏālika min al-ḥādīya ʿašr ʾilā ʾāḫar al-diwān; Talḫīṣ fī l-maqāla al-ḥādīya ʿašara min kitāb al-ḥayawān li-ʾArisṭūṭālīs wa-ḏālika tisʿ maqālāt; Kitāb al-ḥayawān) تلخيص تسع مقالات من كتاب الحيوان، تلخيص تسع مقالات من كتاب الحيوان و ذلك من الحادية عشر الى آخر الديوان، لارسطاطاليس 565/1169
- [26] Chapter on animals / Maqāla fī l-ḥayawān (Aka: Kalām lahū ʿalā l-ḥayawān) مقالة في الحيوان
- [27] Short Commentary on De plantis

=== Questions ===
- [28] Questions on the Philosophy of Nature / Sefer ha-derušim ha-ṭibʿiyim

== Psychology ==
=== Commentaries ===
- [29] "Book on the Soul" or Short Commentary on De anima / Kitāb al-nafs كتاب النفس
- [30] Middle Commentary on De anima / Talḫīṣ kitāb al-nafs تلخيص كتاب النفس 577/1181
- [31] Long Commentary on De anima / Šarḥ kitāb al-nafs (Aka: Šarḥ kitāb al-nafs li-ʾArisṭūṭālīs) شرح كتاب النفس لارسطاطاليس
- [32] Commentary on the Parva naturalia / Talḫīṣ al-ḥiss wa-l-maḥsūs. تلخيص الحس و المحسوس Sevilla, 13. Rabīʿ al-ʾāḫar 565 [ca. 01/04/1170]

=== Treatises on the Intellect ===
- [33] Enquiry whether the intellect in us, named the material intellect, is able to know in the end the separate forms or not =Epistle on the possibility of conjunction / Kitāb fī l-faḥṣ hal yumkin al-ʿaql ʾallaḏī fīnā wa-huwa al-musammā bi-l-hayūlānī ʾan yaʿqila al-ṣuwar al-mufāriqa bi-ʾāḫirihī ʾau lā yumkin ḏālika wa-huwa al-maṭlūb ʾallaḏī kāna ʾArisṭūṭālīs waʿadanā bi-l-faḥṣ ʿanhū fī kitāb al-nafs (Aka: ʾIggeret ʾefšarut ha-debequt) كتاب في فحص هل يمكن العقل الذي فنى و هو مسمى بالهيولاني ان يعقل الصور المفارقة باخره او لا يمكن ذلك و هو المطلوب الذي كان ارسطاطاليس وعدنا بفحص عنه في كتاب النفس
- [34] Chapter on the conjunction of the separate intellect with man / Maqāla fī ttiṣāl al-ʿaql al-mufāriq bi-l-ʾinsān (Aka: Masʾala fī ʿilm al-nafs suʾila ʿanhā fa-ʾajāba fīha; Epistola de connexione intellectus abstracti cum homine) مقالة في اتصال العقل المفارق بالانفسان، مسألة في علم النفس سئل عنها في فاجاب فيها
- [35] Chapter on the conjunction of intellect with man / Maqāla fī ttiṣāl al-ʿaql bi-l-ʾinsān (Aka: Maqāla ʾaiḍan fī ttiṣāl al-ʿaql bi-l-ʾinsān; Maqāla fī ḏālika ʾaiḍan) مقالة في اتصال العقل بالانسان، مقالة ايضا في اتصال العقل بالانسان، مقالة في ذلك ايضا
- [36] Chapter on the intellect / Maqāla fī l-ʿaql (Aka: Maqāla ʾuḫrā fī ʿilm al-nafs ʾaiḍan) مقالة في العقل، اخرى في علم النفس ايضا
- [37] Commentary on Alexander's treatise on the intellect / Šarḥ maqālat al-ʾIskandar fī l-ʿaql شرح مقالات الاسكندر
- [38] Commentary on Avempace's epistle on the conjunction of the intellect with man / Šarḥ risālat ittiṣāl al-ʿaql bi-l-ʾinsān li-bn al-Ṣāʾiġ شرح رسالة اتصال العقل بالانسان لابن الصايغ

=== ʿAbd Allāh Ibn Rušd (son of Averroes) ===
- [39] On whether the active intellect unites with the material intellect whilst it is clothed with the body / Hal yattaṣilu bi-l-ʿaql al-hayūlānī al-ʿaql al-faʿʿāl wa-huwa multabis bi-l-jism هل يتصل بالعقل الهيولاني العقل الفعال و هو ملتبس بالجسم

=== Anonymous ===
- [40] De animæ beatudine / Tractatus Aueroys de perfectione naturali intellectus secundum mentem philosophi

== Metaphysics ==
=== Commentaries ===
- [41] Short Commentary on the Metaphysics / Jawāmiʿ kitāb mā baʿd al-ṭabīʿa (Part of: Jawāmiʿ kutub ʾArisṭūṭālīs fī l-ṭabīʿīyāt wa-l-ʾilāhīyāt; Al-gawāmiʿ fī l-falsafa) جوامع كتاب ما بعد الطبيعة، جوامع كتب ارسطاطاليس في الطبيعيات و الالهيات، الجوامع في الفلسفة
- [42] Middle Commentary on the Metaphysics / Talḫīṣ mā baʿd al-ṭabīʿa (Aka: Talḫīṣ kitāb mā baʿd al-ṭabīʿa li-ʾArisṭūṭālīs; Kitāb talḫīṣ mā baʿd al-ṭabīʿa li-ʾArisṭūṭālīs; تلخيص ما بعد الطبيعة، Averrois in septem libros media expositio ab Hælia Cretensi in latinum conversa, Ante hac nunquam excusa, summis vigiliis elaborata) Cordova, 25. Rabīʿ al-ʾāḫar 570 [11/23/1174].
- [43] Long Commentary on the Metaphysics / Šarḥ mā baʿd al-ṭabīʿa. شرح ما بعد الطبيعة

== Practical Philosophy ==
- [44] Middle Commentary on the Nicomachean Ethics
- [45] Epitome of Plato's Republic

== Mathematics ==
- [46] Epitome of the Almagest

=== Other ===
- [47] Kitab Al Kashf an Manahij Al Adilla الكشف عن مناهج الادلة
- [48] The Incoherence of the Incoherence (Tahafut at Tahafut) - A response to Ghazali's The Incoherence of the Philosophers (Tahafut al Falasifa).
