= Sara Lipton =

Medieval historian

Sara Lipton is a medieval historian; she is a Professor of History at Stony Brook University, where she has been appointed as Department Chair for 2023-26. She has been elected to serve as the 100th President of the Medieval Academy of America (2024-25).

Lipton is noted for her work on the medieval origins of the iconography of antisemitism.

== Books authored ==
- Lipton, Sara (2014). Dark Mirror: The Medieval Origins of Anti-Jewish Iconography. New York: Metropolitan Books/Henry Holt. ISBN 978-0805079104. The book traces the development of antisemitic imagery from the 1000s through the 1400s. It was awarded the John Nicholas Brown Book Prize for Best First Book from the Medieval Academy of America.
- Lipton, Sara (1999). Images of Intolerance: The Representation of Jews and Judaism in the Bible moralisée. Berkeley and Los Angeles: University of California Press. ISBN 978-0520215511. The book won the 2015 Jordan Schnitzer Book Award for Cultural Studies and Media Studies from the Association for Jewish Studies.
