= Solomon Molcho =

16th-century Jewish Portuguese mystic

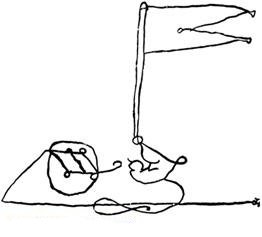
- Stylized signature of Solomon Molcho. Source: Manuscript owned by the Alliance Israélite Universelle
- Born: Diogo Pires; 1500; Kingdom of Portugal
- Died: 13 December 1532 (aged 31–32); Mantua, Duchy of Mantua
- Cause of death: Executed (burning at stake)

Solomon Molcho (Hebrew: שלמה מולכו, romanized: Shlomo Molkho; born Diogo Pires; c. 1500 – 13 December 1532) was a Portuguese Jewish mystic and messiah claimant. When he met with Charles V, Holy Roman Emperor, to urge the creation of a Jewish army, the emperor turned him over to the Inquisition and he was burned at the stake.

== Early life ==
Nothing is known of Molcho's family or even the exact date of his birth. He was born in Portugal sometime between September 1500 and August 1502, probably to Marrano parents. His original name was Diego Pires. He held the post of secretary to the High Court of Appeals of his native country. When the Jewish adventurer David Reubeni arrived in 1525 to negotiate with the king, ostensibly on a political mission from some of the Ten Lost Tribes of Israel, Molcho wished to join him, but was rejected. He then circumcised himself, though without thereby gaining Reubeni's favor, and was forced to emigrate.

== Mystic studies ==
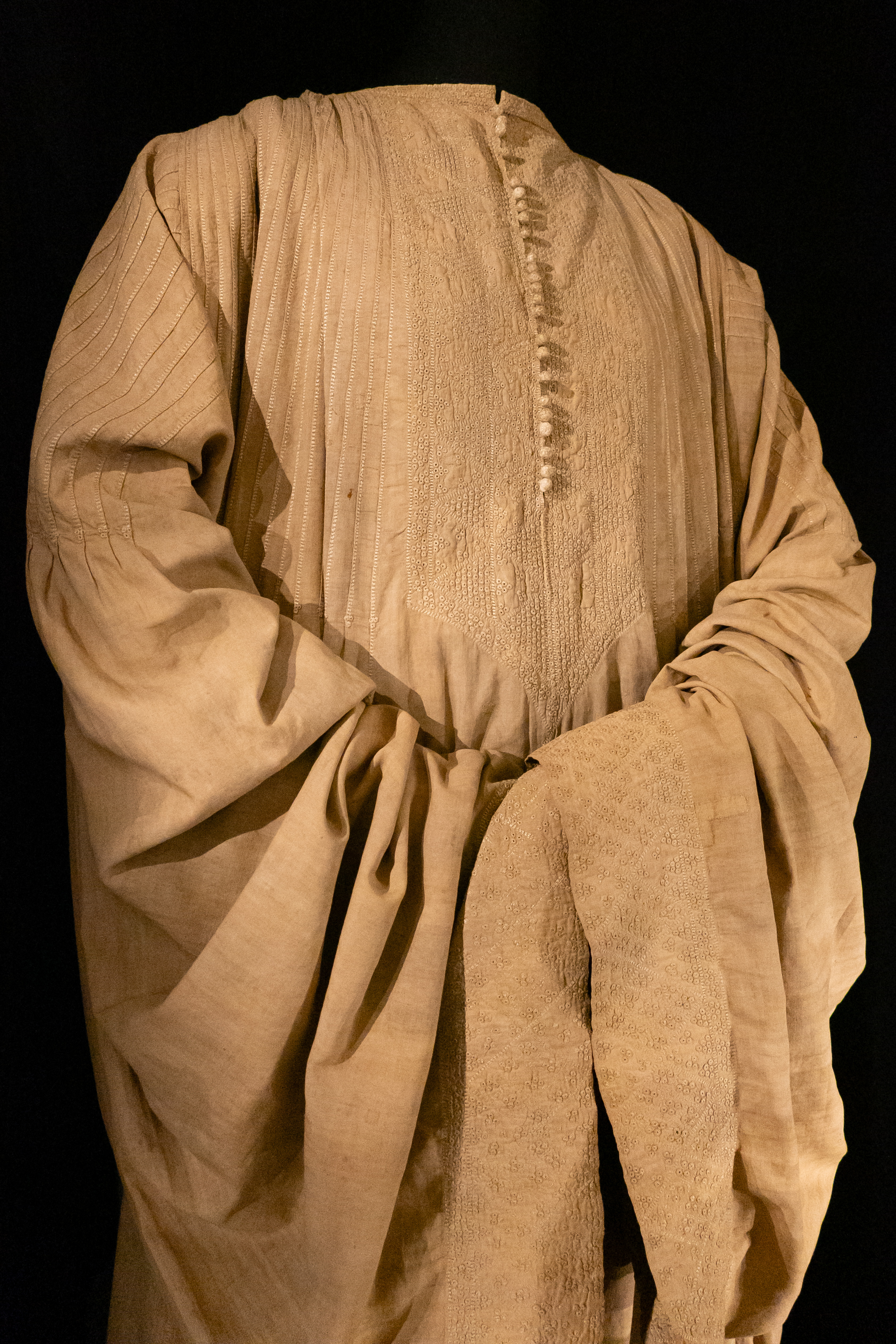
Robe worn by Molcho, made around 1530

Molcho became a master Talmudist and Hebrew Bible exegete and then studied the Kabbalah with Joseph Taitazak. Although it is not certain that Joseph Karo and Solomon Alkabetz met Molcho, he inspired them, mainly because of his martyrdom. He then wandered as a preacher through Italy and Turkey and achieved a great reputation and suggested that the messianic kingdom would come in 1535 or 1540. In 1529, Molcho published a portion of his sermons under the title Derashot, a book later renamed Sefer ha-Mefo'ar. Returning to Italy, he was opposed by prominent Jews, including Jacob Mantino ben Samuel, who feared that he might cause unrest among the Jews. He was given an audience before Pope Clement VII and gained his favor, as well as that of some Judeophile cardinals at Rome. He warned the Pope to leave Rome as the city would soon be flooded and sent a message warning of an imminent earthquake to John III of Portugal. The occurrence of a deadly flood on 8 October 1530 and an earthquake in Lisbon on 26 January 1531, raised Molcho's reputation among the religious and political authorities.

== Travels and execution ==
In company with David Reubeni, his mentor, he went in 1532 to Regensburg, where the emperor Charles V was holding a diet. On this occasion, Molcho carried a flag with the Hebrew word Maccabi, the four letters מכבי that also signify an abbreviation for Exodus 15:11 "Who among the mighty is like unto God?". The three met for two hours. While the exact content of the meeting was not recorded, letters written from the court at the time indicate Molcho proposed the establishment of a joint Jewish-Christian army to fend off the emperor's foreign enemies and, possibly, to reconquer the Holy Land. The emperor had Molcho and Reubeni arrested and took them back to Italy. In Mantua, an ecclesiastical court sentenced Molcho to death by fire. Molcho was taken to the stake in November or December 1532 (a Jewish tradition lists the date as the 5th of Tevet 5293, but no records confirm the date). It is claimed that the emperor offered to pardon him on condition that he return to the Catholic Church, but Molcho refused, asking for a martyr's death. His mentor, David Reubeni, was exiled to Spain, where later he died.

== Writings ==
Molcho published a book of homilies Derashot on the Bible entitled Sefer Hamefoar ("The Magnificent Book"), based mostly on the Talmud and Midrash, in Salonika in late 1529. Two of his biographical letters, which also recount his dreams, were first published, in bowdlerized and censored form, in Amsterdam in 1660, in a book entitled Hayat Kaneh. Modern scholars have discovered several more works by Molcho, including a second book, which he had prepared for publication at the time of his death and which focused on Messianic redemption and emphasized the Kabbala, and a song, and the transcript of a synagogue lecture Molcho delivered in the spring of 1531. His second book, along with his homilies and other writings, including uncensored versions of his letters, were published as Kitvei Shlomo Molcho (The Collected Writings of Shlomo Molcho) in Jerusalem in 2019.

Molcho's writings and speeches highlighted the roles of the Messiah ben Joseph and the Messiah ben David in the process of redemption and stressed that redemption could come if Jews were faithful to God and his commandments or if the non-Jewish religious and political powers were exceedingly evil and oppressive. A dream Molcho had in 1526 apparently led him to believe he was destined to be either the Messiah ben Joseph or his precursor, but in none of his writings or speeches did he ever explicitly state this or proclaim himself the Messiah.

== Cultural influence ==
In 1925, Max Brod published the novel Reubeni, Fürst der Juden (Reubeni, Prince of the Jews), that describe the adventure of Molcho and David Reubeni. In 1928-1929, Aaron Abraham Kabak published a historical fiction novel in three parts about the life of Molcho.

== See also ==
- List of people burned as heretics
- Jewish Messiah claimants
- David Reubeni
