= David Reubeni =

16th-century Jewish political activist

- Born: c. 1490; Khaybar (claimed)
- Died: c. 1541; Spain or Portugal
- Occupation: Jewish political figure

David Reubeni (Hebrew: דוד הראובני, romanized: Dāvid ha‑Reʾūvenī;1490–1535/1541?) a was a Jewish mystic and adventurer. Reubeni presented military and political plans to various Christian rulers in Europe. His proposals, which combined political-military strategies with eschatological elements, along with his origin and enigmatic personality, remain partially understood.

Reubeni managed to secure an audience with king John III of Portugal in November 1525, supported by a letter of recommendation from Pope Clement VII. Reubeni consistently asserted that he was the son of the deceased "King Suleiman of Ḥabor" and claimed to have served as the minister of war for that kingdom, now ruled by his elder brother, King Joseph of Ḥabor. Some scholars regard his claims of nobility as fraud. According to his accounts, this kingdom had 300,000 "Israelite" subjects. Initially, the Portuguese king was intrigued by Reubeni's proposals and agreed to provide Portuguese arms. However, after five months, Reubeni fell into ill repute with the king of Portugal, who perhaps distrusted his motives, and was asked by the king to leave his kingdom. Reubeni was subsequently taken to Spain and handed over to the Spanish Inquisition in Llerena, Badajoz, where he is presumed to have been executed c. 1541.

== Biography ==
=== Origin ===
Reubeni's origins remain unknown. That said, Gedaliah ibn Yahya ben Joseph, in Sefer Shalshelet Ha-Kabbalah (Book [of] the Chain of Tradition), described him as "a man of dark complexion, like a Negro, and of low stature." Ibn Yahya ben Joseph elaborates that when Reubeni visited Portugal, he needed interpreters who escorted him on his journey since he spoke only Hebrew and Arabic.

According to historian Aaron Zeev Aescoly, Reubeni reported that he was born around 1490 in a place referred to as Ḥabor (Khaybar), which was subsequently identified with a place with a similar name in the central Hejaz of the Arabian Peninsula. Reubeni related that he had been sent by his brother, King Joseph, who ruled Ḥabor with seventy elders and was seeking alliances against the Turks conquering the area for its great wealth.

Another version is that his true origin was at Cranganore, on the Malabar Coast of India, where a large and well-organized Jewish community had lived for many centuries. Yet another version connects his origin with Afghanistan. Daoud Roubani is the name of a folk hero of the Pashtuns; the similarity of the names is notable. Scholar Walter J. Fischel, in 1965, published an overview of all Judeo-Persian writing from ancient tombstones in Afghanistan, found all over the country, suggesting the former existence of a Persian-Jewish merchant community centered in the lost medieval capital of Afghanistan, Firozkoh. Little is known about the broader history of the Jews in Afghanistan.

=== Mission to Rome ===
Reubeni envisioned a grand alliance between three Christian kings and one Jewish kingdom: Charles V, Holy Roman Emperor; the King of France; Prester John, the western alias given to the then-emperor of Ethiopia; and the Jewish kingdom of Khaybar, which Reubeni's brother then governed. The broader aim of the prospective alliance was to provide the military force in arms to expel the Ottoman Turks from the Land of Israel, and to facilitate what Reubeni believed was the imminent redemption of the oppressed nation of Israel. To achieve his objective, Reubeni needed to enlist the help of Pope Clement VII, and, therefore, he set out for Rome. In Rome, with the help of a Jewish friend, he laid out his detailed plans before the Pope, who told him he could not personally get involved in building such a coalition. Nevertheless, he referred Reubeni to John III of Portugal, the king of Portugal, who was directly related to Charles V through his marriage to the king's sister. Acquiescing, Reubeni then set sail from Italy for Portugal, accompanied by a brief and letters of recommendation from the Pope to help facilitate his errand.

Eventually, Reubeni was given an audience before the King of Portugal. The king, impressed by the idea, initially agreed to supply Reubeni with Portuguese arms. Still, after five months, Reubeni fell into ill repute with the king of Portugal, who perhaps distrusted his motives, and was asked to leave the kingdom.

=== Oriental travels ===
He left Khaybar on December 8, 1522, travelled a ten-day journey until he reached the port of Jeddah, crossed the Red Sea, and disembarked from his boat in the city of Suakin. He then joined a camel caravan that took him northward, following the Nile River through the Nubian Desert in northern Sudan, during which he disguised his identity by dressing as a Muslim and claiming to be a descendant of Muhammad. This was done out of a concern for his own safety while travelling in a predominately Muslim country. He eventually reached Cairo, where his Jewish host was reluctant to host him because of his Muslim appearance; Gaza; Hebron, where he visited the cave of the Patriarchs; and Jerusalem. When he spoke to Jewish audiences, he described large Jewish kingdoms in the east, possibly referring to the extant communities of Cochin Jews or Yemeni Jews. The Portuguese Empire had recently conquered Goa. Reubeni traveled in the Ottoman Empire in the spring of 1523 and to Venice by way of Alexandria in February 1524.

=== European travels ===
In Venice, he reported to Pope Clement VII, claiming to represent a mission from the Jews of the east. He attracted funding from a Jewish painter, Mose, and a Jewish merchant, Felice, for travel to Rome. The same month, Reubeni entered the city while riding a white horse.

Reubeni obtained an audience with Cardinal Giles of Viterbo and Pope Clement VII. To the latter, he told a tale of a Jewish kingdom in Arabia ruled by his brother, Joseph Reubeni, where the sons of Moses dwelt near the Sambation River. He brought letters from Portuguese captains confirming his statements. The Portuguese minister, Miguel da Silva, reported to his court that Reubeni might be useful in obtaining allies. The Portuguese were competing against Selim I, who had seized Egypt in 1521 and diverted the valuable spice trade.

Jewish people raised money privately to support Reubeni's travel to Almeirim, the residence of King John III of Portugal, which he reached in November 1525. At first, the king promised him a force of eight ships and 4,000 cannons. Engaged in persecuting suspected marranos, the king found it difficult to ally with a Jew. While they were negotiating, the king refrained from interfering with conversos.

Reubeni's striking appearance—a swarthy dwarf in Oriental costume—and messianic claims attracted the attention of Diego Pires, a descendant of conversos and a secretary to the High Court of Appeals of Portugal. Despite Reubeni's opposition, Pires returned to his Jewish roots, circumcised himself and took the Hebrew name Solomon Molcho (שלמה מולכו, Šelōmō Môlkō. Jewish ambassadors from the Barbary States visited Reubeni at the Portuguese court. Some conversos were so excited by this activity that they rose in arms near Badajoz, where they freed a converso woman from the Inquisition. Portuguese authorities became concerned about Reubeni's mission and the dangers posed by widespread unrest. Reubeni then went to Avignon to take his cause to the papal court, and afterward to Milan. There he met Molcho again, who had traveled to the East and made messianic claims. In Milan, the two quarreled. Reubeni went to Venice, where the Venetian Senate appointed a commission to review his plans for obtaining assistance from the Jews in the East.

=== Arrest and death ===
Reubeni was warned to leave Venice. Joining once more with Molcho, he traveled with a streaming banner to Bologna and Ratisbon (Regensburg) to meet Charles V. Reubeni offered Charles V an alliance with eastern Jews against the Ottoman Empire. In Ratisbon, Reubeni and Molcho met Josel of Rosheim, who warned them against arousing the emperor's suspicions. Josel was worried about raising issues of the Jews in the empire. When Reubeni and Molcho persisted, officials put them in chains and took them to the emperor in Mantua.

Inquisitors examined both Molcho and Reubeni. The former was condemned to burning at the stake in 1530, during the reign of Emperor Charles V. Reubeni was taken to Spain and assigned to the Spanish Inquisition at Llerena, Badajoz. As late as 1535, he was still confined in a prison there. Nothing more was heard of him. He probably died there, as Alexandre Herculano reported that "a Jew who came from India to Portugal" was burned at an auto da fé in Évora in 1541. Another source said Reubeni died in Llerena after 1535.

Reubeni's diary is held by the Bodleian Library, Oxford. There was possibly a copy at the Jewish Theological Seminary of Breslau, but the seminary was destroyed by the Nazis in 1938. Parts were published by Heinrich Graetz in the third edition of his Geschichte der Juden (vol. ix.), and the whole was published by Neubauer, in M. J. C., ii.

== Cultural influence ==
In 1925, Max Brod published the novel Reubeni, Prince of the Jews (Reubeni, Fürst der Juden), which describes the adventure of David Reubeni and Solomon Molcho.

== See also ==
- Eldad ha-Dani
- Jewish Messiah claimants
- Solomon Molcho

== Bibliography ==
- Verskin, Alan. Diary of a Black Jewish Messiah: The Sixteenth-Century Journey of David Reubeni through Africa, the Middle East, and Europe. Stanford, CA : Stanford University Press, 2023. ISBN 9781503634435
- Benmelech, Moti, "History, Politics, and Messianism: David Ha-Reuveni's Origin and Mission", AJS Review, 35 (2011), pp.35–60.
