= Pointed hat =

Type of headgear

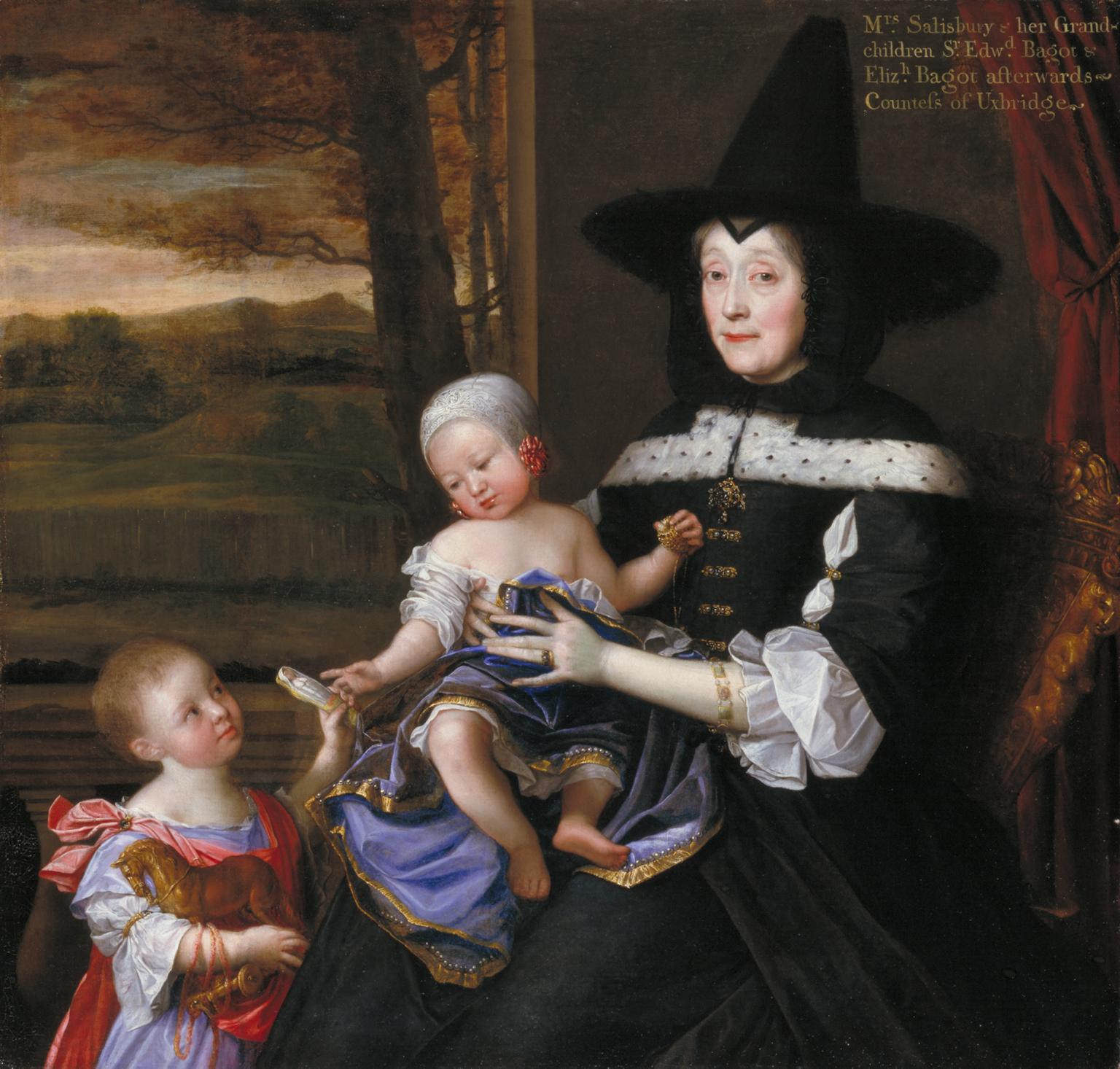
John Michael Wright, Mrs Salesbury with her Grandchildren Edward and Elizabeth Bagot, c. 1676, Tate Britain

Pointed hats have been a form of headgear of a wide range of cultures throughout history. Although often suggesting an ancient Indo-European tradition, they were also traditionally worn by women of Lapland, the Japanese, the Mi'kmaq people of Atlantic Canada, and the Huastecs of Veracruz and Aztec (e.g., as illustrated in the Codex Mendoza). The Kabiri of New Guinea have the diba, a pointed hat glued together.

== History ==
The conical hat is known to have existed as early as the Bronze Age in the Middle East, Eurasia, and Central Europe. Conical hats were recorded in ancient Egypt, especially when depicting Osiris and pharaohs, who emulated Osiris' iconography. Conical hats were also recorded by many Indo-European civilizations. Golden hats have been recorded in burial sites in Central Europe. The Scythians of the Eurasian steppes were noted for having pointed hats, often mentioned by other civilizations, such as in the DNa inscription on the tomb of Darius the Great. In Ancient Greece, the pilos was a common hat worn by travelers and infantrymen by the 5th century BCE. Popular among Burgundian noblewomen in the 15th century was a type of conical headgear now called a hennin.

=== Iron Age ===
Textile analysis of the Tarim Mummies has shown some similarities to the Iron Age civilizations of Europe dating from 800 BCE, including woven twill and tartan patterns strikingly similar to tartans from Northern Europe. One unusual find was a distinctively pointed hat:

Yet another female – her skeleton found beside the remains of a man – still wore a terrifically tall, conical hat just like those we depict on witches riding broomsticks at Halloween or on medieval wizards intent at their magical spells.

— Elizabeth Wayland Barber

Pointed hats were also worn in ancient times by Saka (Scythians), and are shown on Hindu temples (as helmets and metal crowns) and in Hittite reliefs. As described by Herodotus, the name of the Scythian tribe of the tigrakhauda (Orthocorybantians) is a bahuvrihi compound literally translating to "people with pointed hats".

Besides the Scythians, the Cabeiri as well as Odysseus are traditionally pictured wearing a Pilos, or woolen conical hat.

Ancient conical hats

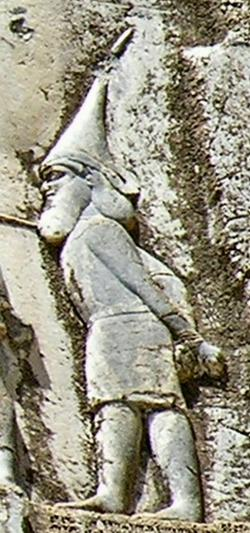
Scythian (Saka tigrakhauda) leader with the pointed cap typical of his people

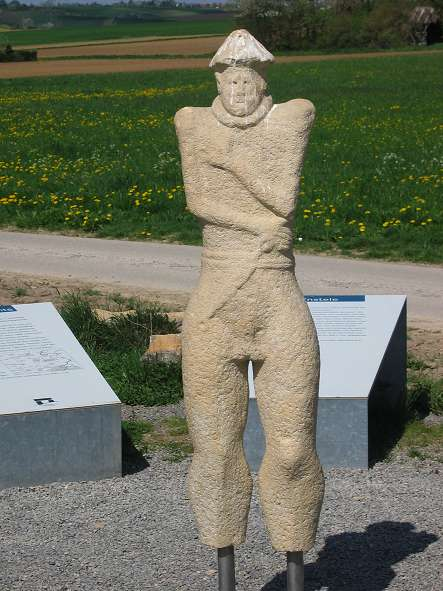
The Hallstatt culture Warrior of Hirschlanden wears a pointed hat or helmet.

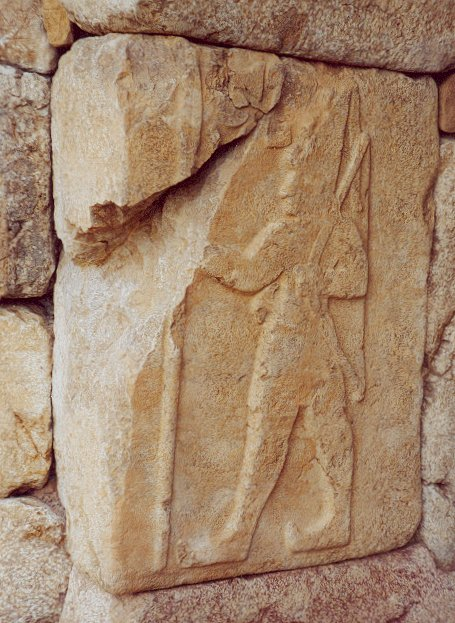
Relief in Hattusa, probably depicting Suppiluliuma II.

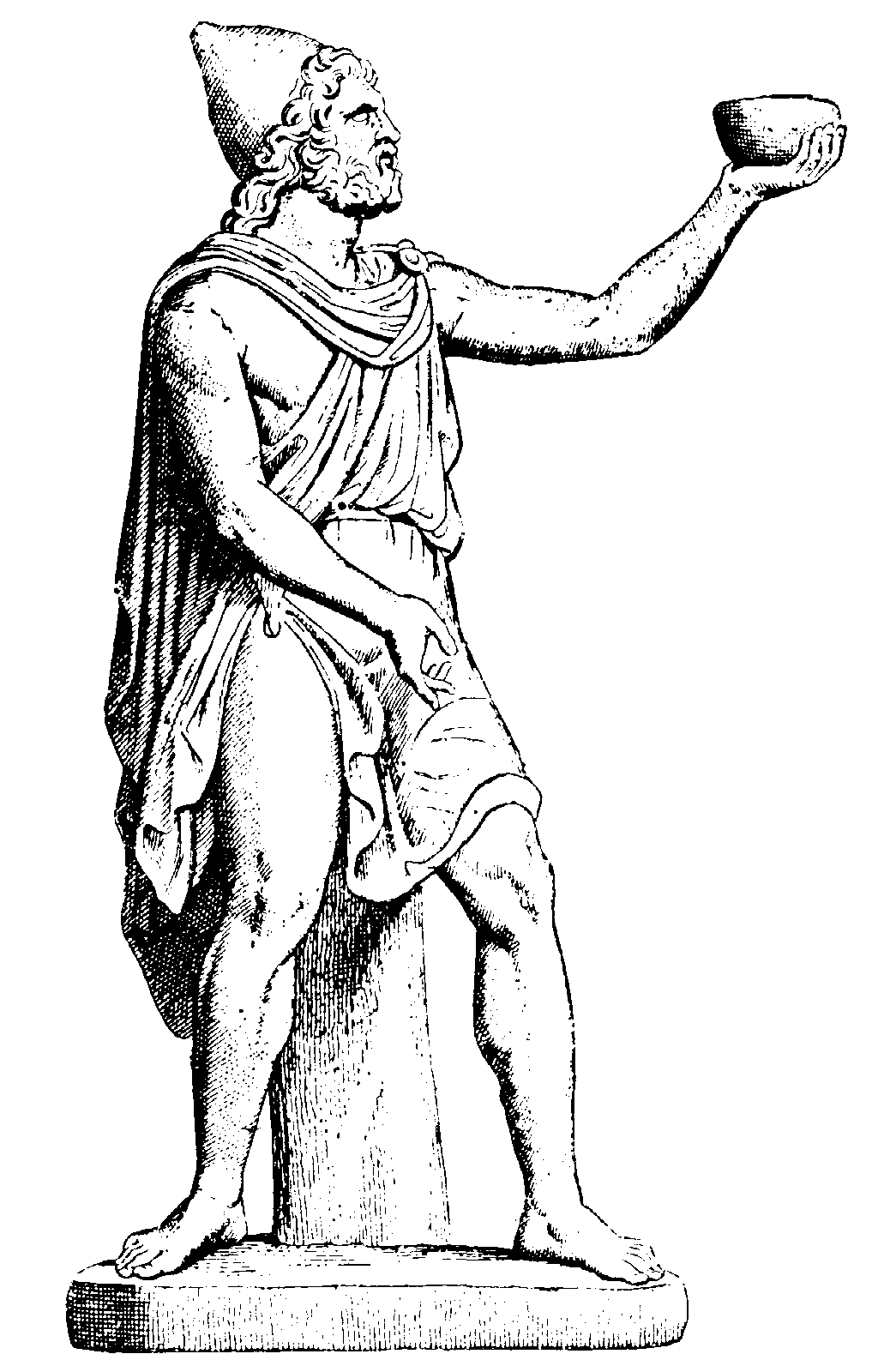
Odysseus wearing a Pilos

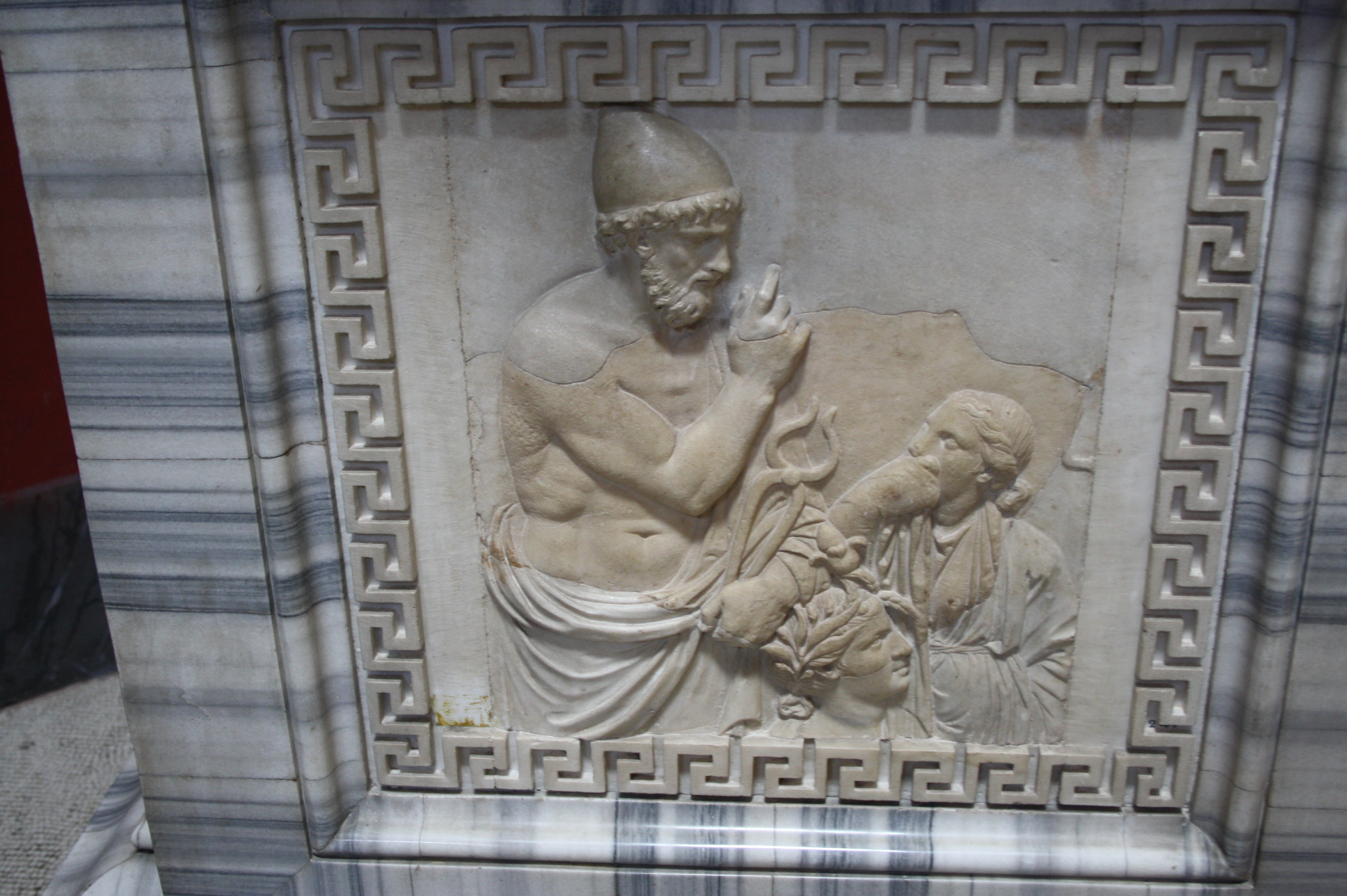
Hephaestus

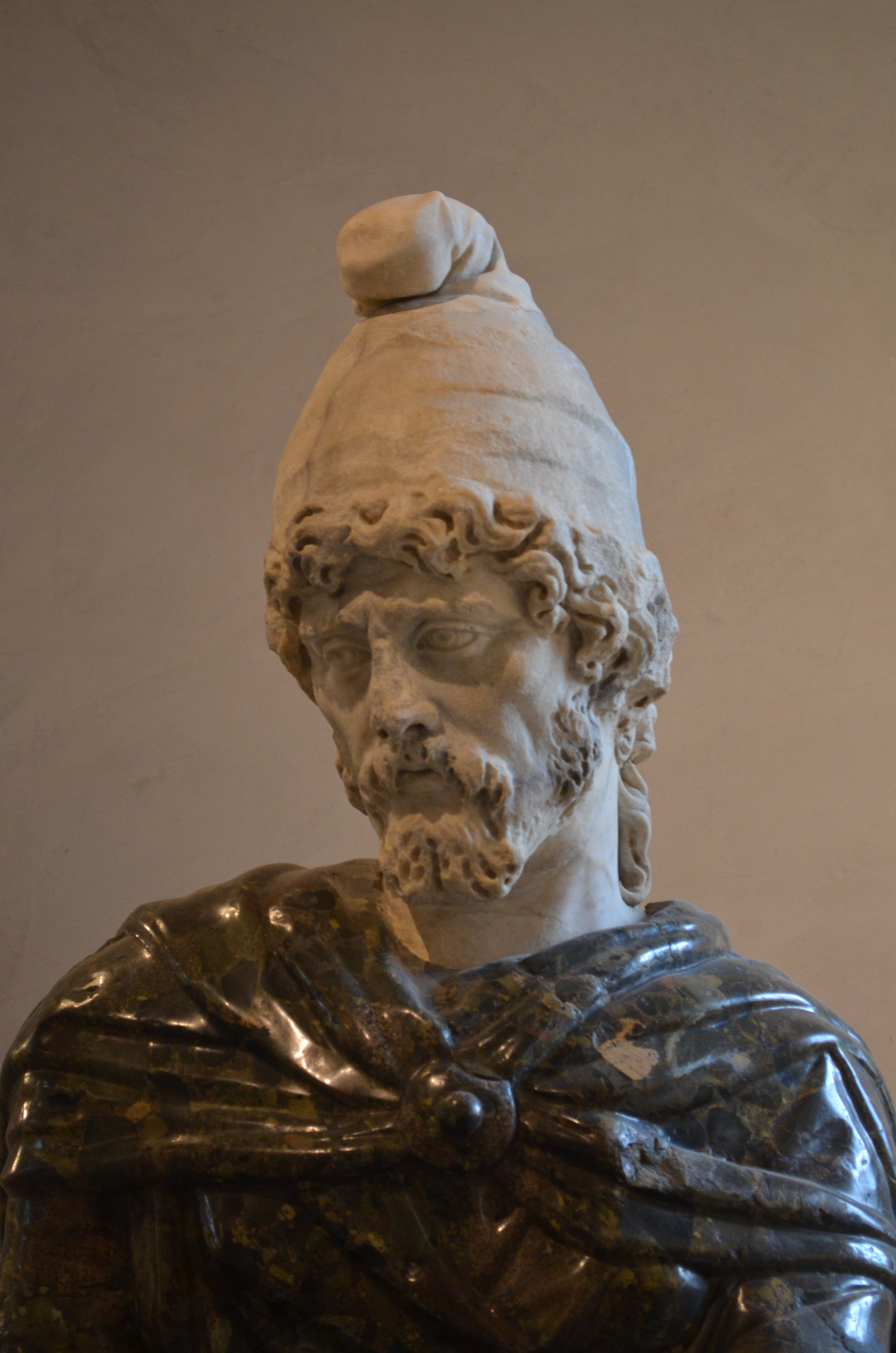
Prisoner with Phrygian cap (Roman statue from the 2nd century), Louvre

=== Middle Ages ===
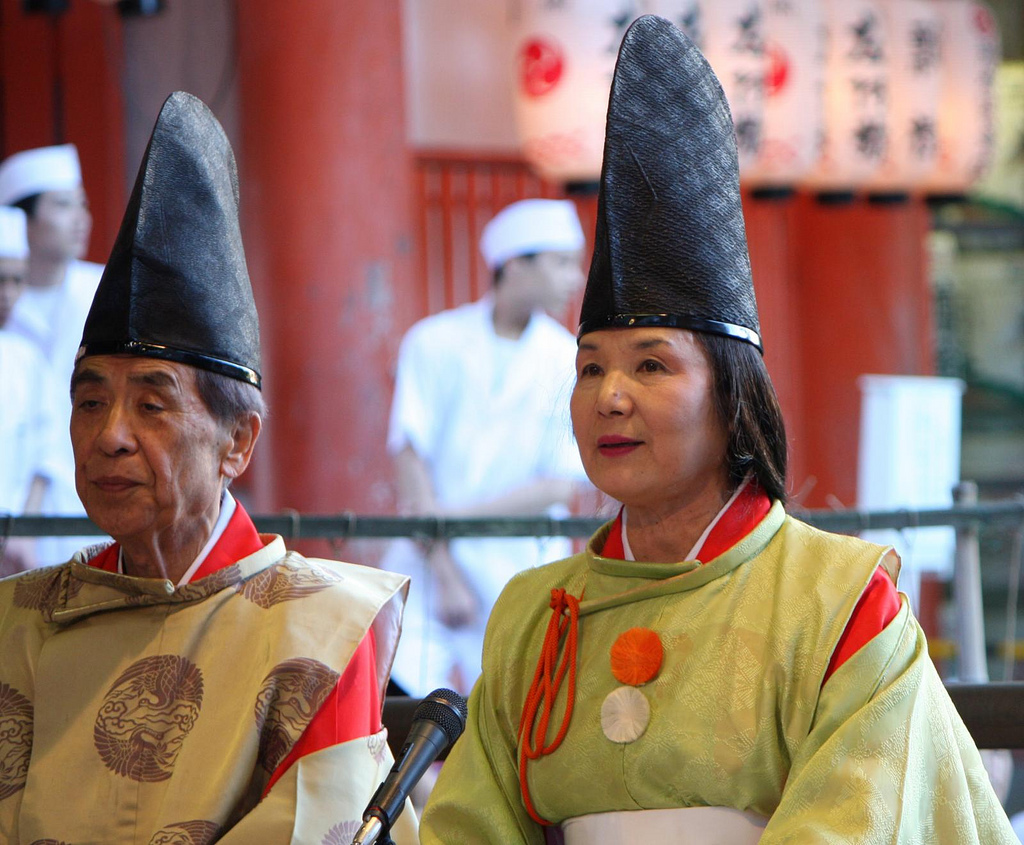
A kazaori eboshi from the Japanese Heian period

The 13th-century Cumans commonly wore scythian style pointed hats, and are reported to have fought wearing them.

Originating from the Japanese Heian period, the kazaori eboshi (風折烏帽子) was worn by aristocrats to indicate rank. Still worn today for ceremonial purposes, this black linen hat was used during a samurai's ceremony in attaining manhood.

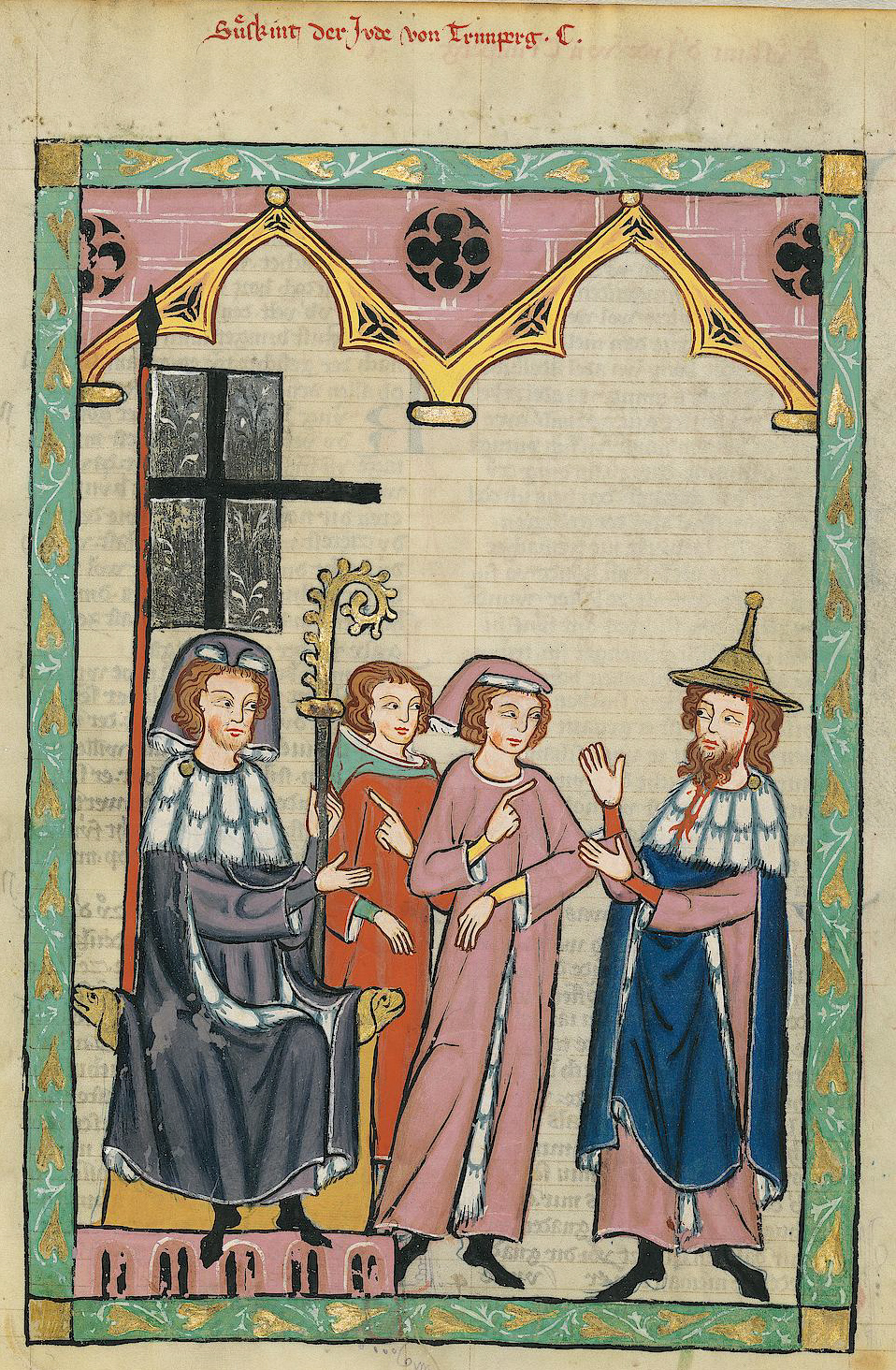
The Jewish poet Süßkind von Trimberg wearing a "Jewish hat" (Codex Manesse, 14th century)

Medieval Jewish men wore distinctive headgear as required by European Christian authorities. This included the pointed Jewish hat (or "Judenhut") already worn by Jews, a piece of clothing probably imported from the Islamic world and perhaps before that from Persia.

Popular among Burgundian noblewomen in the 15th century was a type of conical headgear now called a hennin.

== Modern times ==
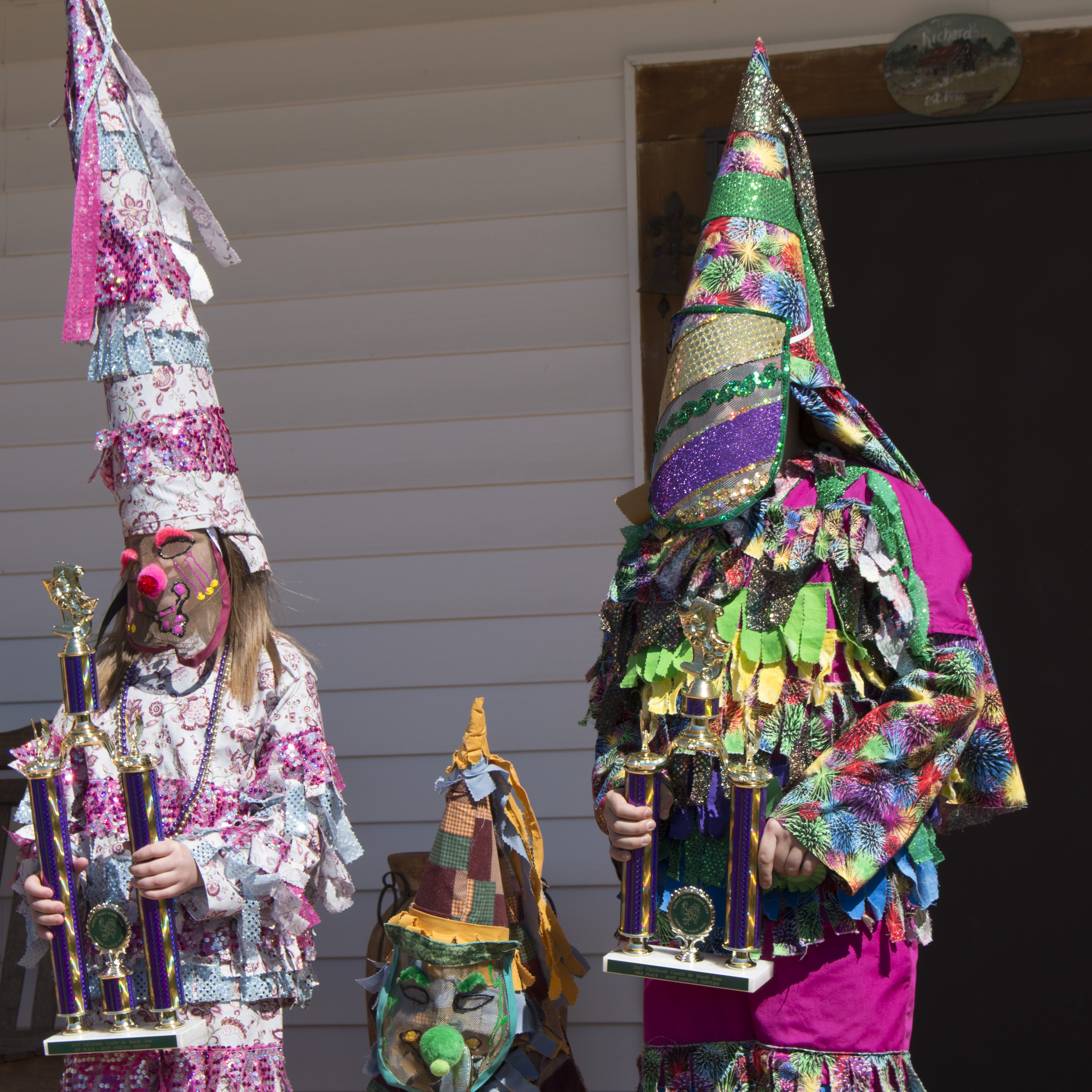
Pointed hats at 2017 Courir de Mardi Gras in rural Louisiana

Pointed hoods were used by various orders and Catholic lay confraternities for processions (e.g., the Semana Santa of Sevilla, who wore the Capirote).

Pointed hats are still worn in the rural Louisiana Mardi Gras celebrations by the Cajuns, the Courir de Mardi Gras, where they are known as capuchons.

The Ku Klux Klan has worn this headgear since its inception.

Tall conical hats are common to traditional folk ceremonies in many parts of Europe, particularly at Carnival time. Examples can still be seen in Italy, Spain, and Bulgaria.

The May Day hobby horses of Padstow and Minehead in southwest England have pointed hats with masks attached.

== Types ==
Type	Image	Notes
Bashlyk		This traditional Turkic and Cossack cone-shaped headdress hood is usually made of leather, felt or wool. It is an ancient round topped felt bonnet with lappets for wrapping around the neck.
Capirote		Historically, the capirote was a cardboard cone worn in Spain.
Capuchon		A capuchon is a ceremonial hat worn during the Mardi Gras celebration in the Cajun areas of southwestern Louisiana, known as the Courir de Mardi Gras.
Asian conical hat		Known as a sedge hat, rice hat, paddy hat or coolie hat, this simple style of hat is often made of straw. It originated in East, South and Southeast Asia, particularly Vietnam, China, Japan, Korea, Cambodia, Philippines, India, Bangladesh and Indonesia.
Dunce cap		In popular culture, the dunce cap is typically made of paper and often marked with a D or the word "dunce", and given to schoolchildren to wear as punishment by public humiliation for misbehaviour and, as the name implies, stupidity.
Fulani hat		A conical plant fiber hat covered in leather both at the brim and top, worn by men of the Fulani people in West Africa.
Golden hat		This type of hat is a very specific and rare type of archaeological artifact from Bronze Age Europe.
Hennin		Most commonly worn in Burgundy and France by women of the nobility, the hennin appears from about 1430 onwards. Later, though, this hat spread more widely, especially in the truncated form. Typically, the hennin was 12 to 18 inches (30 to 45 cm) high, generally accompanied by a veil that usually emerged from the top of the cone and was allowed to fall onto the woman's shoulders.
Hogeon		This Korean traditional headgear for young boys aged one year to five years has flaps, and is a type of gwanmo (관모),.
Jewish hat		The Jewish hat was often white or yellow, worn by Jews in Medieval Europe and some of the Islamic world.
Kalpak		This high-crowned cap is usually made of felt or sheepskin. It is worn by men from southeastern Europe, Iran, Central Asia and the Caucasus.
Kasa		A Kasa is any of several kinds of traditional hats of Japan.
Madhalla		Traditional straw hat from Yemen.
Mokorotlo		A straw hat used traditionally by the Sotho people. It serves as the national symbol of Lesotho.
Nightcap		This garment is worn while sleeping, often with a nightgown, for warmth.
Nón lá		Nón lá is a type of Vietnamese headwear used to shield the face from the sun and rain.
Party hat		A party hat is generally a playful conical hat made with a rolled up piece of thin cardboard, usually with designs printed on the outside and a long string of elastic going from one side of the cone's bottom to another to secure the cone to one's head.
Phrygian cap		The Phrygian cap is a soft cap with the top pulled forward. Associated in antiquity with the inhabitants of Phrygia, a region of central Anatolia; from the French Revolution a symbol of revolution, liberty and republicanism – and in modern times with Smurfs.
Pileus		The pileus was, in Ancient Greece and Rome, a brimless, felt cap, somewhat similar to a fez.
Salakot		Usually made from rattan or reeds, this is a traditional hat from the Philippines.
Sugar loaf		This very tall, tapering hat was first worn in medieval times. Its name comes from the loaves into which sugar was formed at that time. The sugar loaf hat is a kind of early top hat ending in a slightly rounded conical top.
Tantour		Similar to the hennin, this woman's headdress was popular in the Eastern Mediterranean during the 19th century. The most ornate tantours were made of gold and reached as high as 30 inches (76 cm). Some were encrusted with gems and pearls. The tantour was held in by a ribbons tied around the head. A silk scarf was wound around the base with a white veil attached to the peak.
Topor		A topor is worn during Bengali Hindu wedding ceremonies. It is usually white, fragile, and made of sholapith.
Witch hat		A tall, conical hat with a wide brim, which is typically black. It is commonly associated with European witches.

== See also ==
- Cap
- Gugel
- Headgear
- List of hat styles
- List of headgear
- Mitre

== Bibliography ==
- Barber, A.W. (1999). The Mummies of Ürümchi. Macmillan, London.
