= Little Witch in the Woods =

- Developer: Sunny Side Up
- Publisher: Sunny Side Up
- Platforms: Microsoft Windows; Nintendo Switch; Xbox One
- Release: Microsoft Windows; September 15, 2025; Nintendo Switch, Xbox One; September 16, 2026
- Genre: Life simulation game
- Mode: Single-player

Little Witch in the Woods is a life simulation game developed and published by Sunny Side Up. The game follows Ellie, an apprentice witch who lives in a forest, wears a talking witch hat named Virgil, and is able to fish and brew potions. She must complete her training by helping nearby villagers and meeting other witches.

The game was released in early access in 2022, and fully released in September 2025 for Microsoft Windows. Versions for Nintendo Switch and Xbox One were released in September 2026.

== Gameplay ==
In Little Witch in the Woods, the player controls Ellie, an apprentice witch whose ultimate goal is to complete her training and become a formal witch. The core gameplay focuses on exploring different regions, gathering resources, and brewing magical potions. The player can also engage in fishing across various bodies of water. While the primary objective of fishing is to catalog species in Ellie's encyclopedia, fish can also be gifted to villagers or used to earn the affection of local cats. Fish availability varies depending on the specific location and time of day, and the player can frequently determine a fish's type by the size of its underwater shadow before catching it.

== Release ==
Little Witch in the Woods was announced in July 2020 as a crowdfunding project. It was launched in early access in 2022 for Windows, Xbox One and Xbox Series X/S. The game was fully released for PC on September 15, 2025.

== Reception ==
The game was positively received by critics in early access, receiving comparisons with Stardew Valley due to its pixel-art aesthetic and gameplay. Alice Bell of Rock Paper Shotgun said that she "can't get over how lovely it is", and that the trailer had an "impeccable sense of comedic timing". Hope Bellingham of GamesRadar+ called the game "similar to a pixel-art version of Kiki's Delivery Service", and remarked that it was a "cozy game" that they "definitely recommend". Glenn Wilson of Gamezebo called the game's day/night system "clever", as it changes the behavior of the game's creatures. Lauren Morton of PC Gamer called the game's look "undeniably cute" with "some pretty swell tunes".
