= Shiva mask =

Mask of Shiva
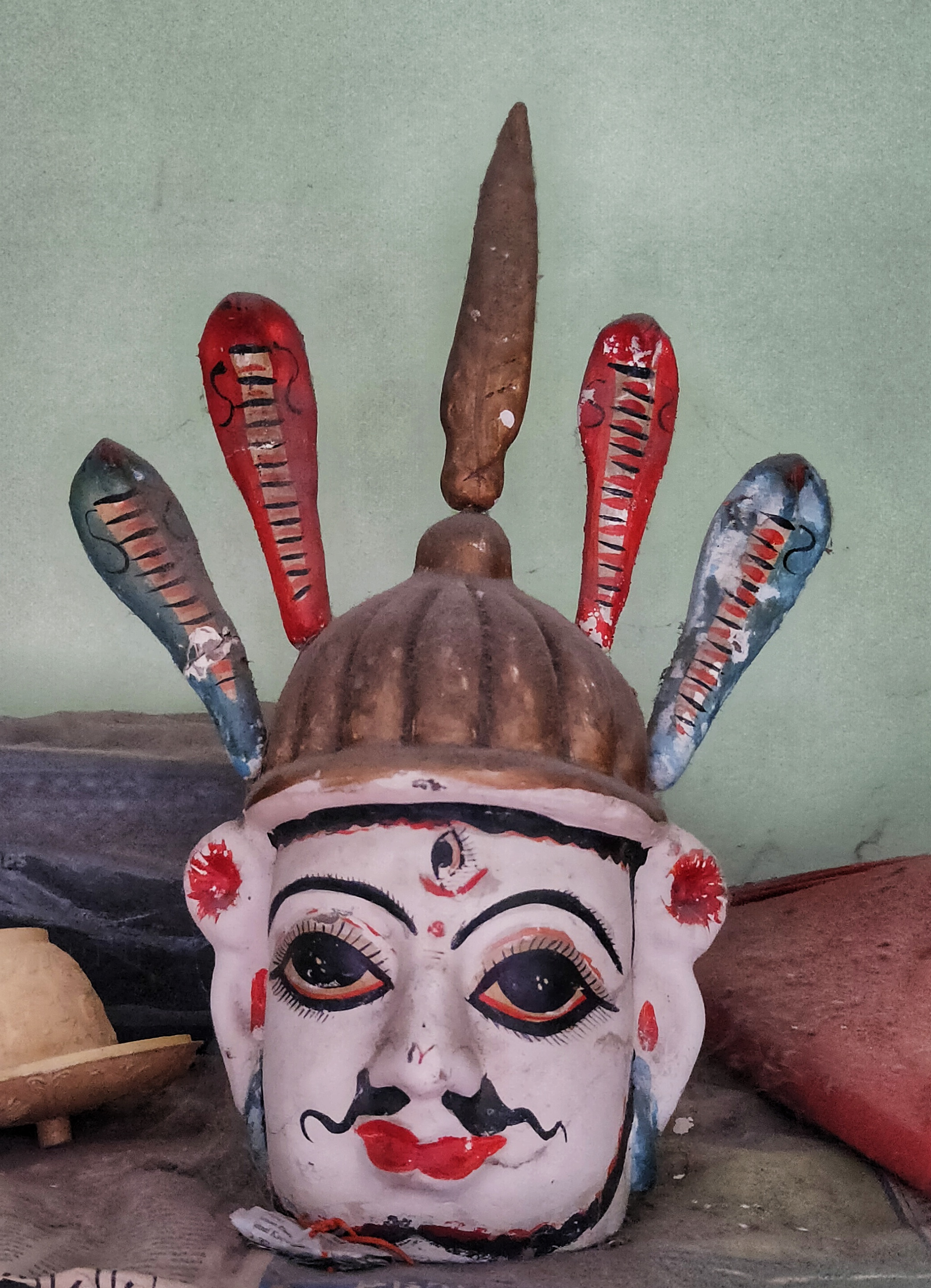
- Shiva Mask from Nabadwip
- Country: Nabadwip, Nadia, West Bengal
- Materials: Clay
- Features: Shiva figurine with a snake hood on the head

Shiva’s mask is a traditional sculpted and decorated clay mask used in folk religious rituals in Nabadwip, West Bengal, India. This mask is crafted during the month of Chaitra (a month in the Bengali calendar), coinciding with the marriage ceremony of Shiva-Parvati, and is deeply intertwined with the traditional Shaivite culture.

Although referred to as a mask, it is actually a sculpture made of clay. This multicolored mask is a notable example of folk art that is still crafted by local artisans as of 2021. Among the traditional and endangered clay figures preserved and showcased by the Biswa Bangla stall, the Mask of Shiva from Nabadwip holds a prominent position.

== Structure and description ==
The mask is made by molding raw clay into shape. Once molded, it is left to dry under the sun. The sculpture is then painted white, and details such as eyes, nose, and ears are drawn onto it. A golden headdress (topor) is then added to the mask. The headdress or crown is decorated with a hooded snake motif atop it, symbolizing Shiva’s connection with serpents.

== Rituals and festivals ==
The mask is crafted during the month of Chaitra to celebrate Shiva's marriage. It is arranged ceremonially and taken door-to-door in the community. Donations collected from households are used to fund Shiva’s marriage festivities. Typically, young boys organize these marriage events for Shiva.
