= Party hat =

Celebratory hats

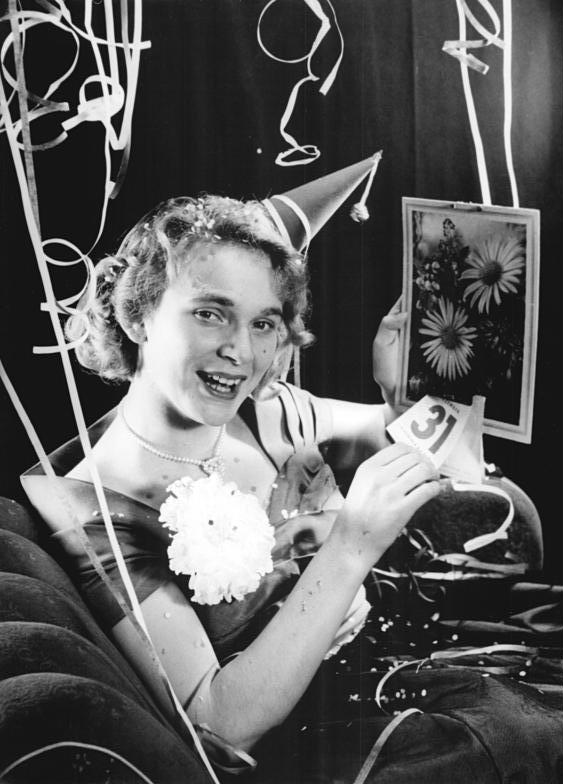
A woman wearing a paper party hat

A party hat is any of a number of celebratory hats, most typically in the form of a conical hat. It is made with a piece of thin paperboard, usually with designs printed on the outside and a long string of elastic acting like a chinstrap, going from one side of the cone's bottom to another to secure the cone to the person's head.

== Origins ==
The party hat has its origins in the dunce cap or sanbenito worn by misbehaving or poorly performing schoolchildren from the mid-19th century to the early 20th century, with its festive decoration and society's positive attitude toward the wearer indicating a relaxation, or even reversal, of certain social norms.

== Usage ==
Party hats are worn most often at birthday parties, especially by the guest of honor or at New Year's Eve celebrations. In the United Kingdom the hat is made of paper and is in the shape of a crown, and is most typically worn during a Christmas dinner. The hat is generally received from a Christmas cracker cracked with someone near oneself at the dinner table.

Non-conical hats worn to signify an occasion's informal and festive status include decorated top hats, hats made from balloons, and Mickey Mouse ears. The beer hat or "beer helmet", patented by Steve Nelson in 1985, is another form of party hat in which cans of beer are attached to a rigid hat with a straw leading from the cans to the wearer.

== Image gallery ==
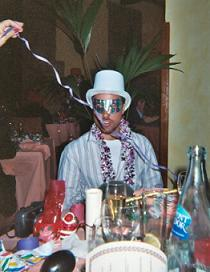
Young man wears a party top hat at a New Year's Party.

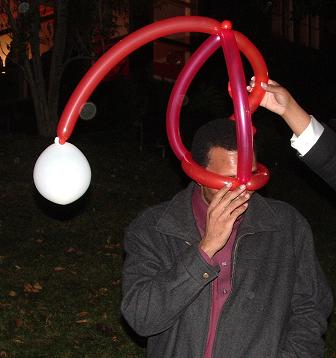
A party hat made with balloons.

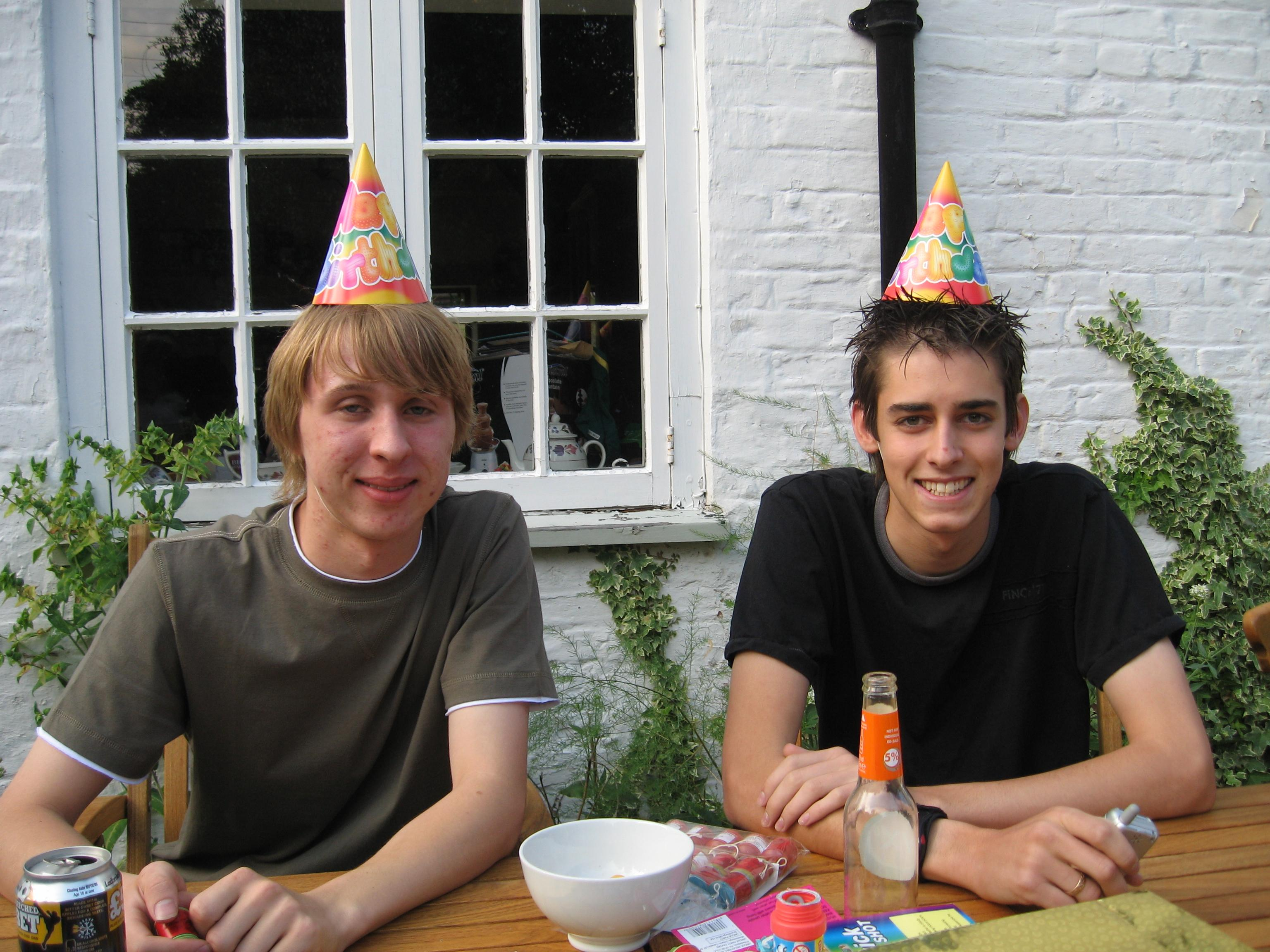
Two people wear party hats at a birthday party.

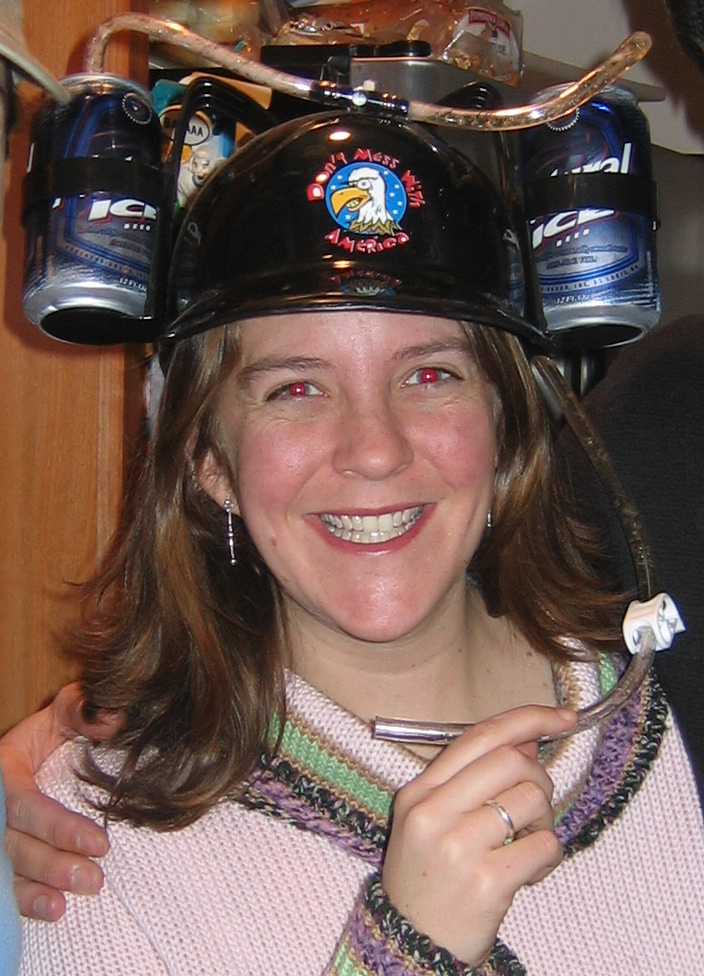
Person wearing beer helmet.

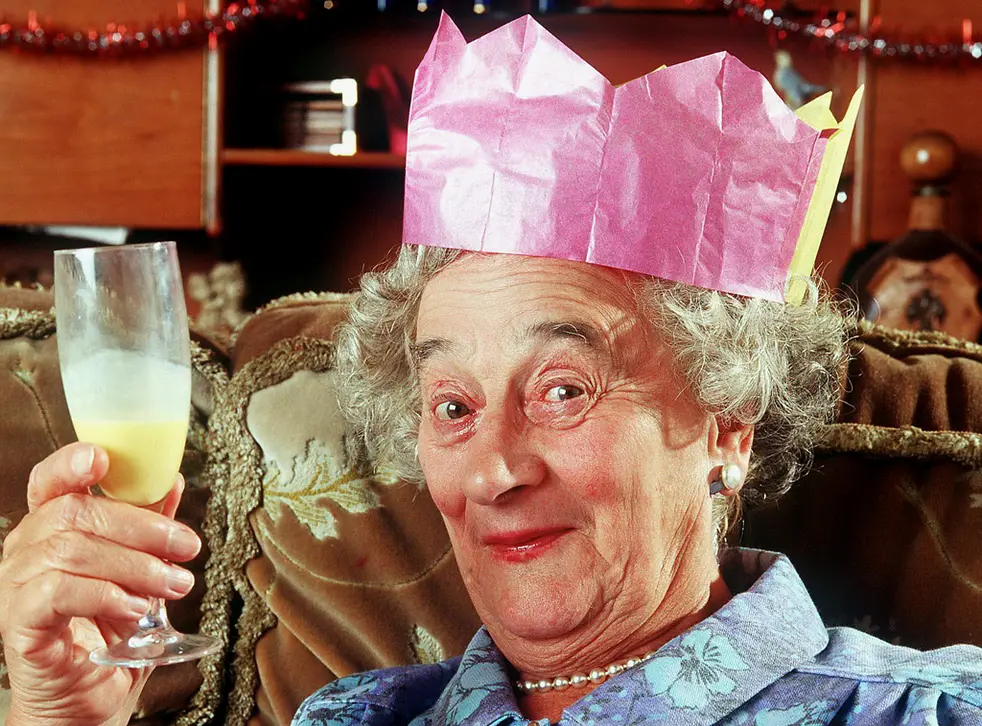
Paper crown, often referred to as a paper hat in the UK

== See also ==
- Pointed hat
- List of hat styles
- List of headgear
