= Annaprashana =

Hindu rite of passage marking first solid food

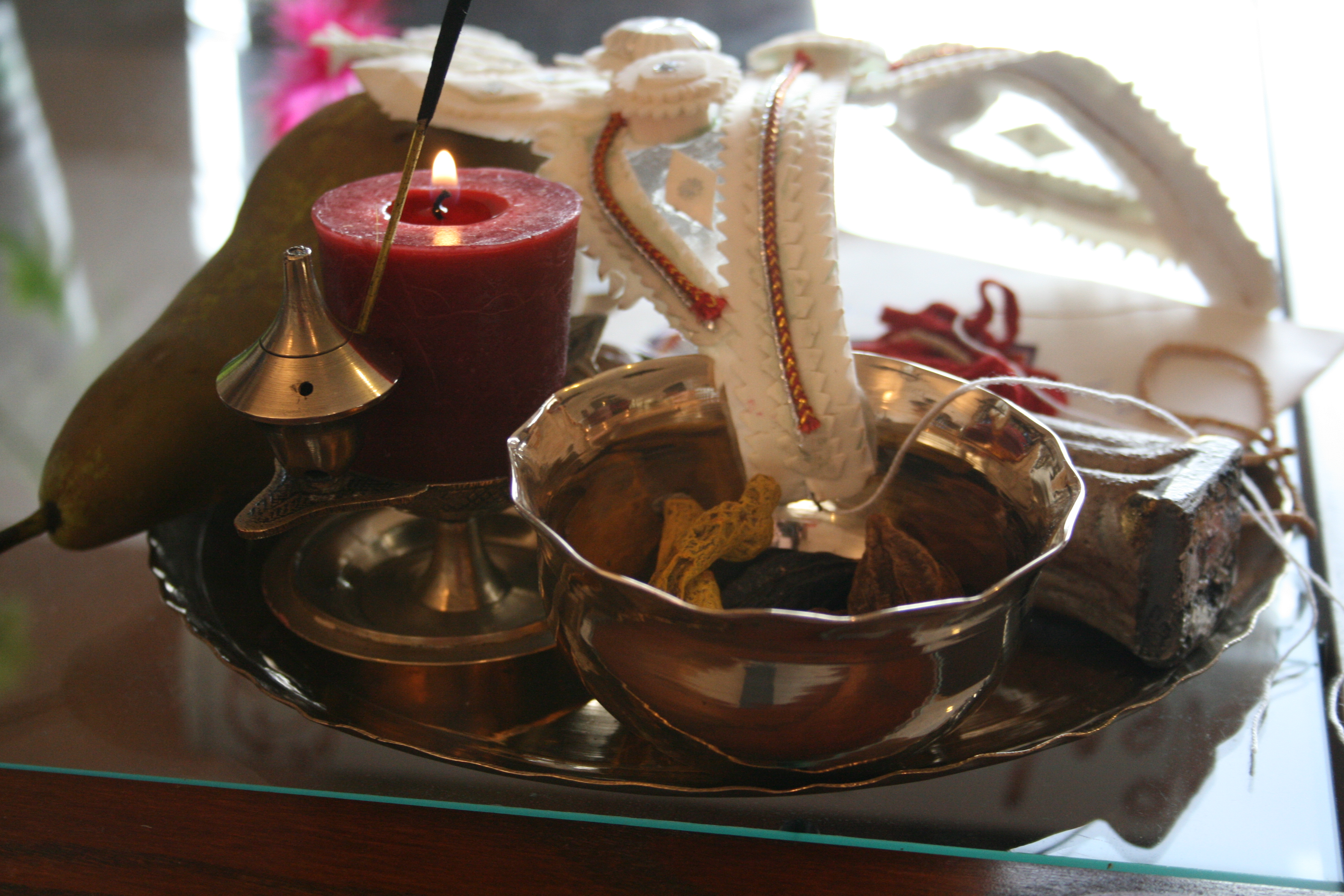
Annaprashan offerings

The annaprashana (Sanskrit: अन्नप्राशन, romanized: annaprāśana), also known as annaprashana vidhi or annaprashanam, is a Hindu rite of passage (Saṃskāra) that marks an infant's first intake of food other than milk. The term annaprashana means 'eating of cooked rice'. In Vedic Hindu culture, the child cannot eat rice until the annaprashana has occurred. Importance is given to rice because of its symbolism as a life-sustaining food and a sacred food in the form of kheer. The annaprashana remains an important milestone and the ceremony is celebrated in Nepal and India. It is also known as mukhēbhāt in West Bengal, cōṟūṇŭ in Kerala, and bhāt khulai in Himachal Pradesh. In Nepal, it is also called macha jankow or pasni.

== Etymology ==
The word annaprāśana is made of two Sanskrit words, anna meaning 'cooked rice' and prāśana meaning 'feeding'. The ceremony of annaprashana is referred to in English as grain initiation or rice-feeding ceremony.

== Ceremony ==
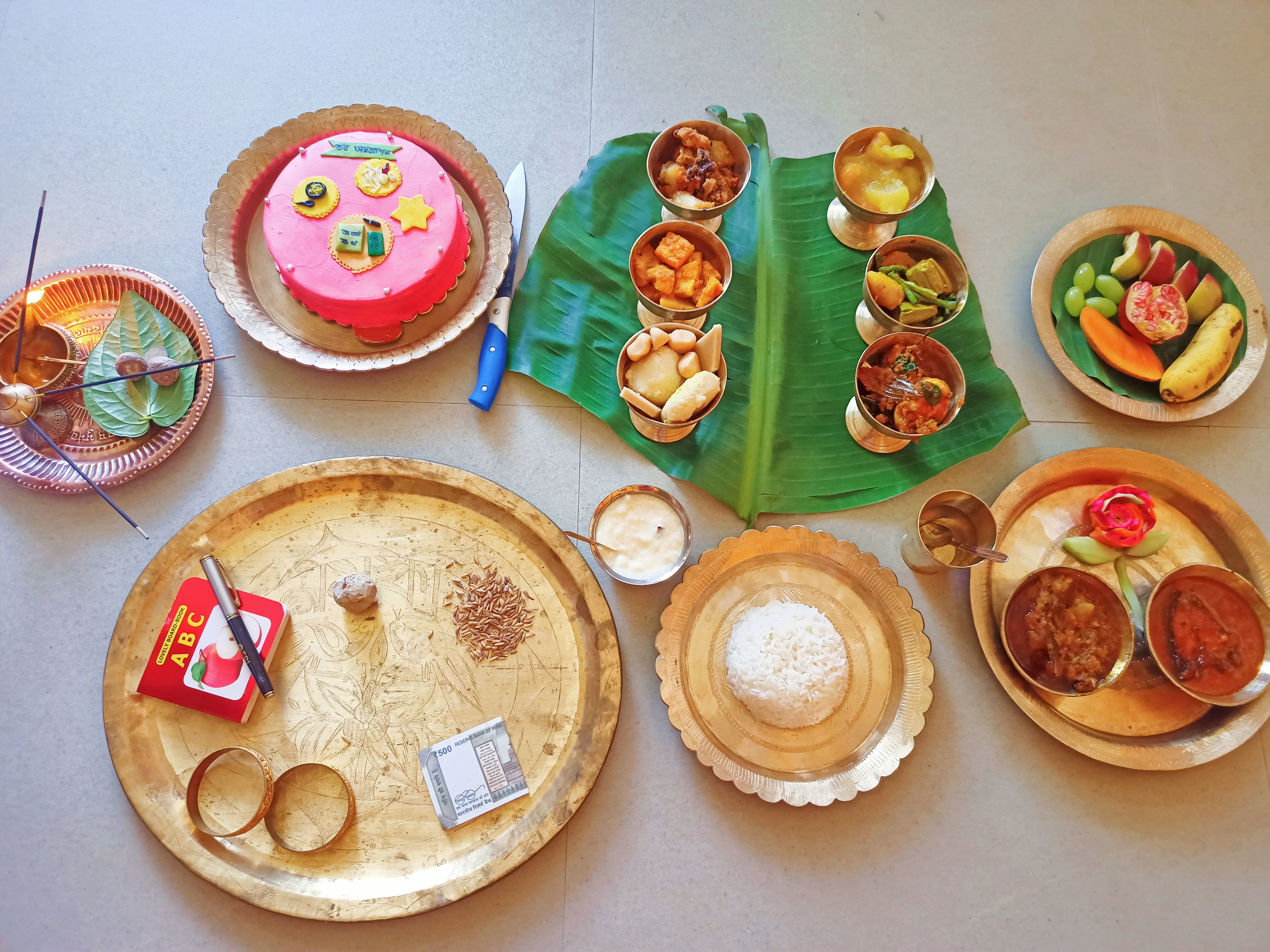
Arrangements for an annaprashana

The ceremony is a puja followed by the rice feeding. It is arranged in consultation with a priest who selects an auspicious date when the child is five to eight months old. Bengalis/Telugus believe that odd months are auspicious for baby girls (month 5 or 7) and even months (month 6 or 8) for baby boys.

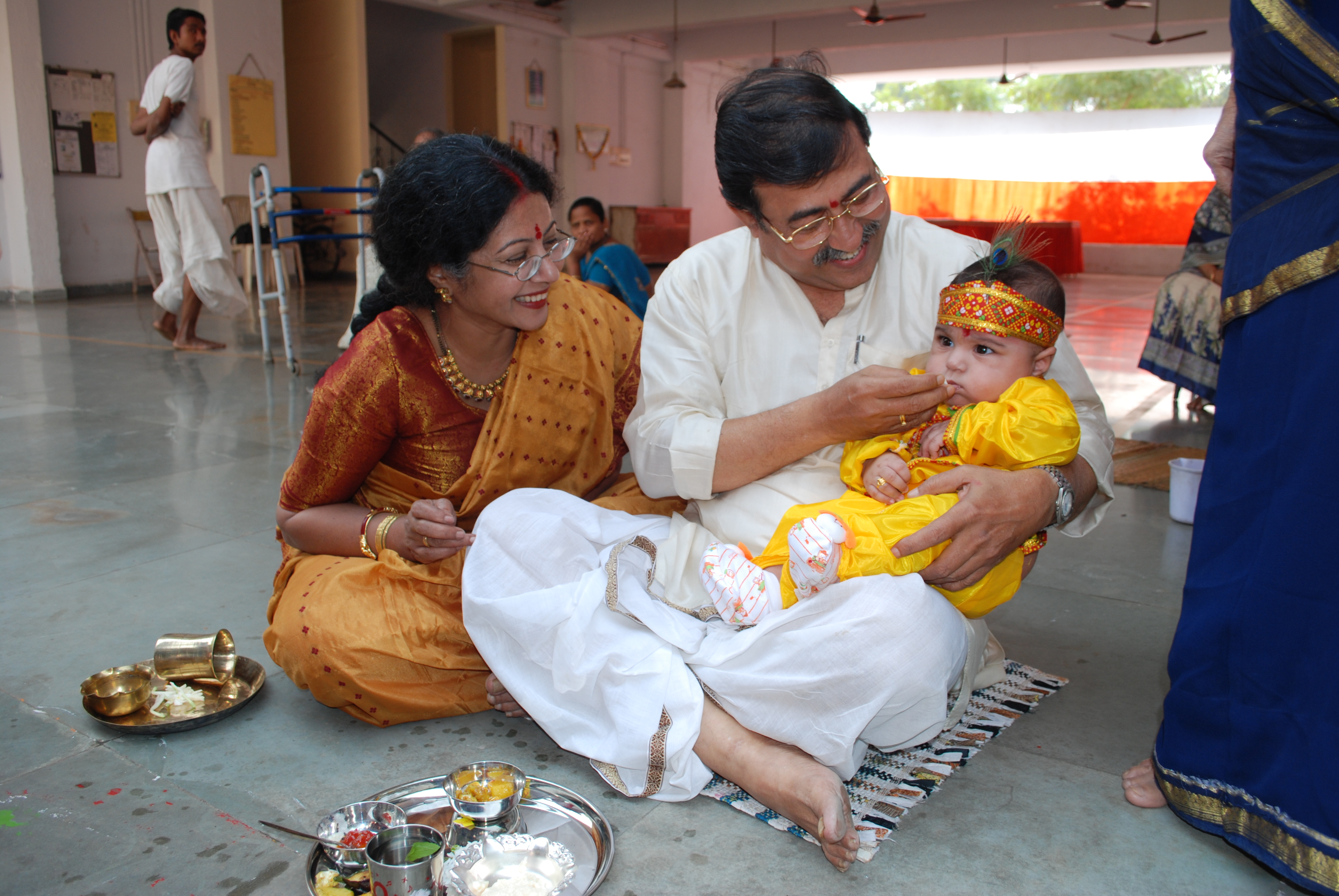
Child being fed rice during an annaprashana ceremony.

The child is bathed, dressed in ceremonial attire, and placed on the parents lap, as prayers are offered to deities to bless the child with good digestive powers, good speech, and good mental development. This is then followed by the feeding of rice in the form of a sweet pudding called kheer that is considered a holy food in Hindu religious ceremonies. Ancient Hindu texts (Smriti) provide detailed instructions relating to the performance of this rite of passage (saṃskāra) including the type, quality, and quantity, and the cooking process for the solid food that the child should be fed. It is an occasion for celebration, and extended family, friends, and neighbors are invited to attend.

== Bengali culture ==
In Bengali Hindu culture, the annaprashana is an elaborate ceremony called the mukhēbhāt 'rice in the mouth' or mamabhāt 'maternal rice', where the child's maternal uncle or maternal grandfather feeds them rice. This takes place in the maternal uncle's home or maternal grandparents's home or as a grand occasion in a banquet hall, and the religious rites (puja) of the ceremony may be conducted by a priest at the same event or as a separate gathering before the larger event. For the rice feeding, babies are dressed in traditional headdress (topor) and a specific variety of food is prepared, including kheer and also five different types of fried foods and a fish dish. The kheer is customarily prepared by the baby's mother or grandmother and served in a vessel made of silver. Conch shells are blown and women in attendance will engage in Ululation to mark the holiness of the occasion, as the child's maternal uncle or maternal grandfather feeds them. The ceremony is followed by a game, where the baby is offered a banana leaf or silver plate which contains certain objects: a small amount of soil (symbolizing property), a book (symbolizing learning), a pen (symbolizing wisdom), and coins or money (symbolizing wealth). Traditional belief is that the object picked up by the baby represents a prominent highlight in their future. The baby's elder relatives and elder guests will then take turns to feed the child a small portion of kheer and offering their blessings by placing dhaan (rice seeds) and dubba (grass stalks) on the baby's head.

== Malayali culture ==
In Malayali culture, the annaprashana is called the cōṟūṇŭ (Malayalam: ചോറൂണ്) or cōṟūṇal (Malayalam: ചോറൂണൽ) and the ceremony is held in a temple in the child's sixth month. Cōṟu means 'rice' and unnuka means 'to eat'. The baby is dressed in a traditional kasavu, placed on an uncle's or parent's lap, then blessed with sandal paste, tulsi leaves, and flowers by the temple priest. A banana leaf plate with food, including rice or kheer and banana, is placed in front of the child, from which the baby's uncle, father, or grandfather feeds him or her first. It can be tradition for the baby's father to dip a gold ring into each of the food items and then touch the ring to the baby's tongue. The rice feeding is followed by a lighthearted tulabhara where the weight of the child is taken to ensure it matches the weight of the family's offering to the temple and deities.

== Nepalese culture ==
This ceremony is held at five months for daughters, and six months for sons. An auspicious date and time is chosen by an astrologer, usually a Hindu, and all the closest relatives are invited to witness and to celebrate. The rice is the first and easily digestible solid food a baby eats. This custom varies with the variation of religion, caste and also place. Gurung, Magar serve kheer (rice pudding) which is rice cooked with milk and sugar. Similarly, Brahmin and Kshatris also do same. Whereas myriads of dishes are prepared and served in Newar. The main rice dish is served in one giant (often woven) plate of leaves. The remaining dishes, typically 84, are served around the main dish.

A video of first rice ceremony, Pasni in Budhanilkantha Temple Nepal

The baby is dressed in saffron silk cloth (although modern families will often put a diaper (nappy) on, to minimize accidents.) The baby is held by baby's mother while the entire family feed her or him the first taste of rice. It is the mother's right to feed the child first. This is because symbolically, after breastfeeding the child, she is asking the gods to bless the child who is now entering the world of other regular food. Musicians playing traditional music can be invited to start the function at the given auspicious time. After the baby has eaten, she or he will undergo another extensive puja (worship ceremony) often led by a priest and accompanied by chanting from ancient scriptures.

For the rest of the day, the baby is dressed in a special outfit, usually made of red velvet and embroidered with silver and golden thread. The child is offered with gifts, money by close relatives, and gold and silver ornaments by grandparents. These ornaments include heavy silver anklets (kalli) carved with dragon at both the ends to keep the bad omens away from baby. These ornaments can be handed on as heirlooms. In some Newari communities, it is also common for sons to have upper lobe of the right ear pierced with gold ornaments with different beads.
