= Sholapith =

Plant matter used in pith helmets, etc.

Sholapith or shola pith (also referred to as shola and Indian cork) is a dried milky-white spongey plant matter from Aeschynomene species. It can be pressed and shaped into objects of art, or for practical use. It is the "pith" used for pith helmets, so giving them their name.

== Aeschynomene ==
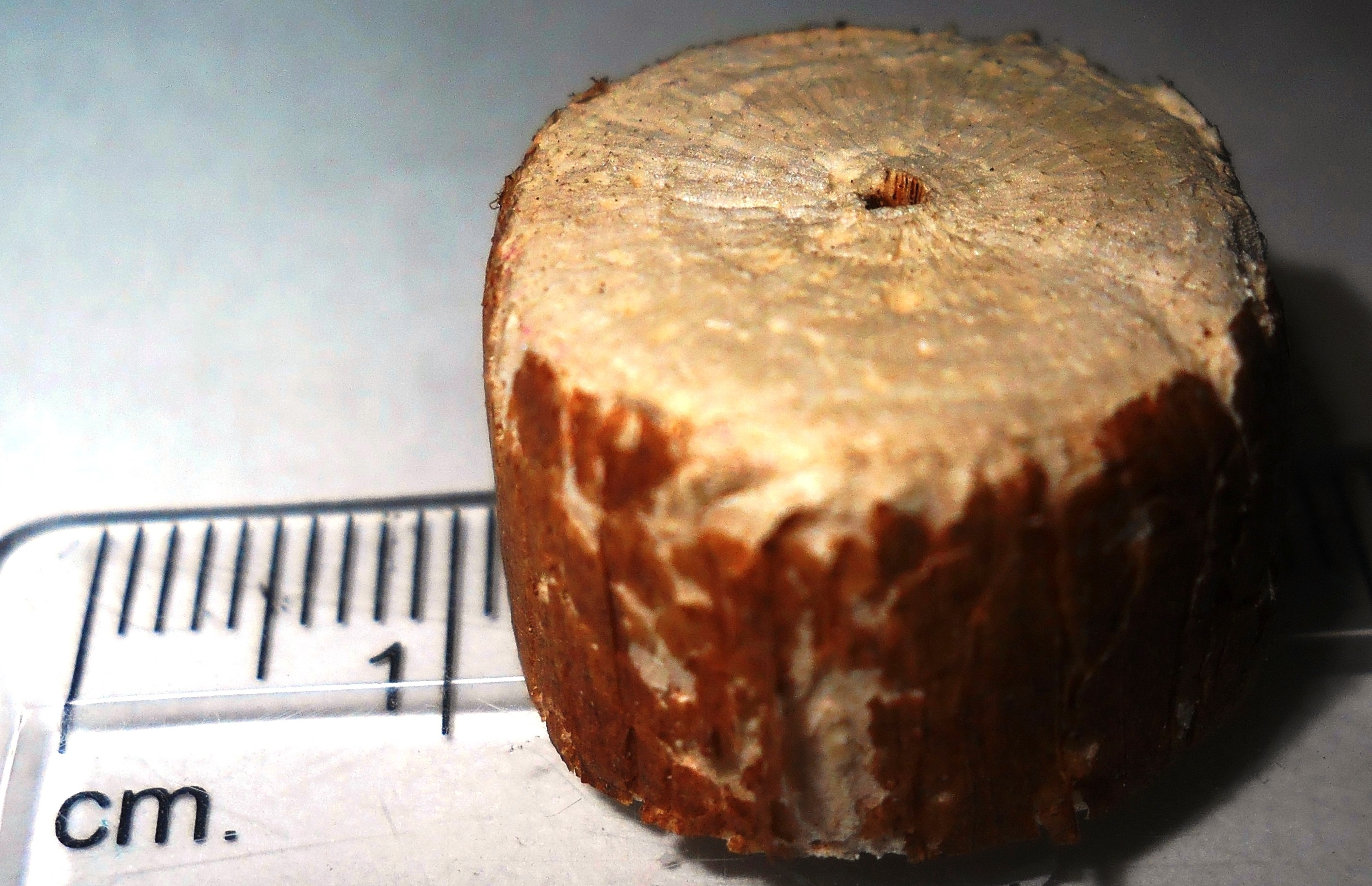
A piece of Aeschynomene sp. stem. The very thin, reddish brown layer around the stem is the bark. The whitish interior is the wood. The central, dark hollow tube contained the pith which disappeared with the ageing of the plant.

The useful part of this plant is the wood (secondary-xylem) of the stem. This wood is often mistaken as the pith.

The wood of Aeschynomene is among the world's lightest.

Shola grows wild in marshy waterlogged areas. The biological name of shola is Aeschynomene aspera of the bean family. It is an herbaceous plant, which grows especially in the marshy areas of Bengal, Assam, Odisha and the Deccan. The sholapith is the cortex of the plant and is about 1.5 inches (38.1 mm) across.

== Crafts ==
Traditionally sholapith products have been used for decorating Hindu idols and creating the headgear of brides and grooms for a traditional Bengali wedding. In more recent times, sholapith handicrafts have found a wider application in home décor such as Hindu gods and artistic objects.

== West Bengal ==
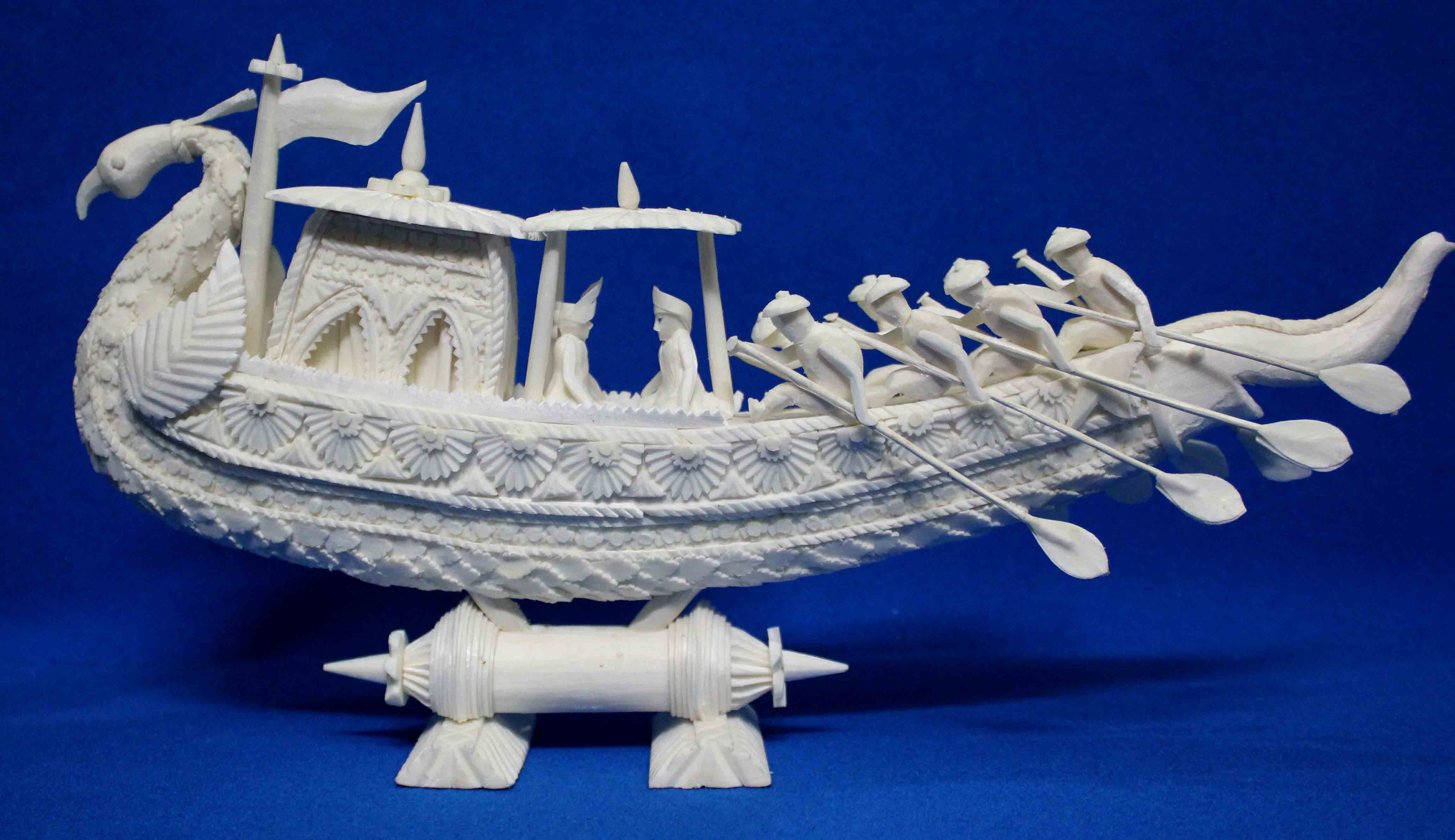
An example of sholapith craftwork.

In West Bengal, this craft is mainly practised in the districts of Bardhaman, Murshidabad, Birbhum, Nadia, Hooghly, Malda and south 24 Parganas district. Sholapith craftsmen are known as Malakar, meaning "garland maker", probably because they made shola garlands for idols and for the noble class.

About 5,000 artisans practice this craft. Craftsmen spend months on each piece. In Murshidabad shola crafts are flowery designs, decorative headwear of gods and goddesses, garlands, figurines such as the faces of gods and goddesses, elephant howdahs, peacock boats and palanquins. Shola products are exported to across the world. In South 24 Parganas, many poor families earn their livelihood from shola products. Big puja pandals of Calcutta are beautifully decorated using shola.

The idol makers of Kumortuli who traditionally produced clay idols have taken to making idols of sholapith and fibreglass. While fibreglass products can cost around ₹1100,000-,200,000, those prepared from sholapith cost ₹90,000. The height of the idols can vary from four to nine feet. These are mostly purchased for Indian community puja organizers abroad.

== Pith helmet ==
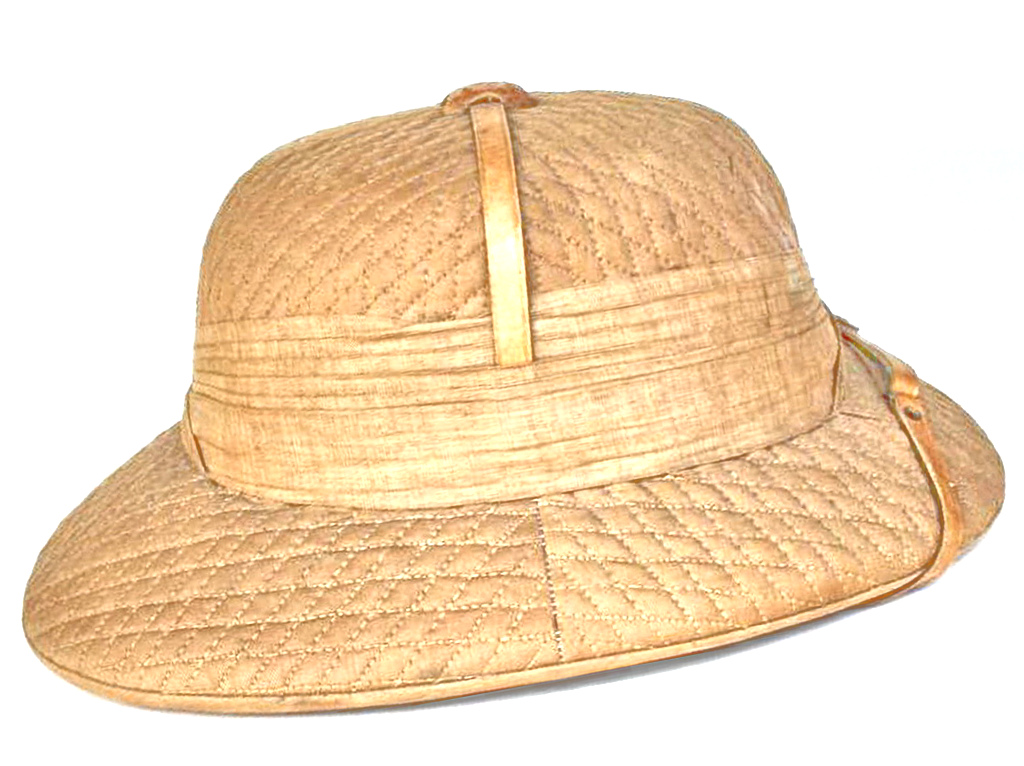
An "Aden" or "Cawnpore" style of pith helmet. They were manufactured in India until about 1938.

The shola (sola)-style pith helmet—also known as the sun helmet, topee, shola topee, salacot or topi, is a lightweight helmet made of shola pith, with a cloth cover and a particular design and thickness designed to shade and insulate the wearer’s head from the sun. It was popular among Westerners in India, Pakistan, Egypt, Sudan, Iraq, Transjordan, Palestine, Sri Lanka, and other tropical and subtropical British colonies until the late 1960s.

The Shola-style helmet has recently gained popularity among traffic police in cities such as Chennai during the summer as they insulate the wearer from the heat.

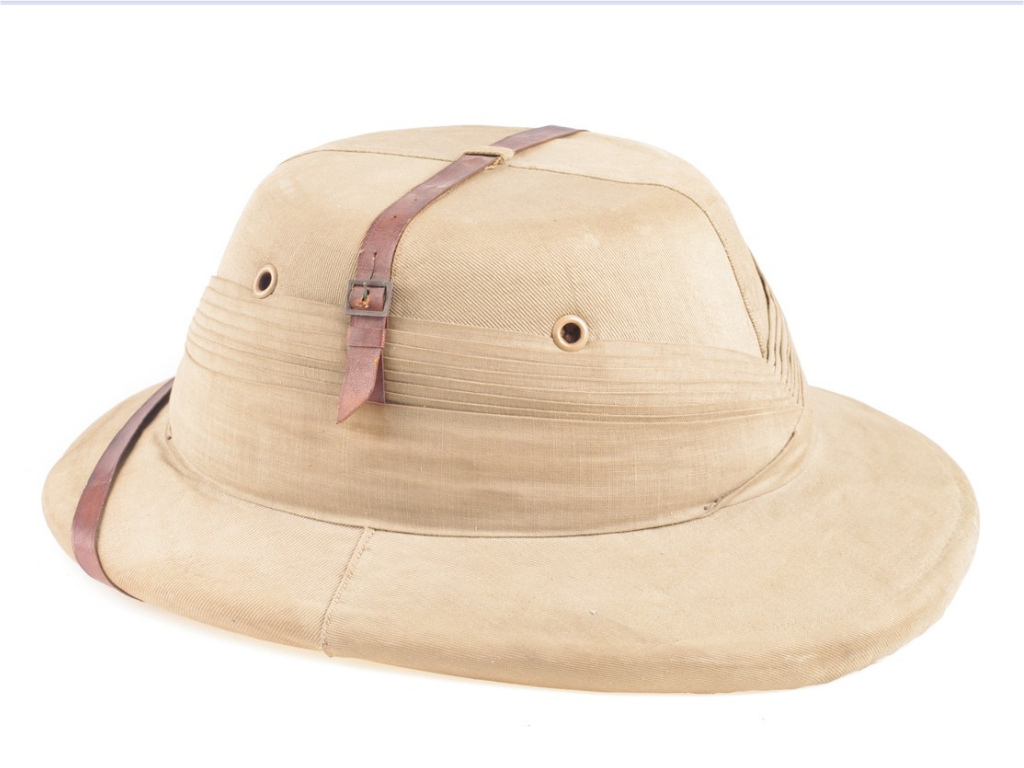
An Indian-made 'Bombay Bowler' shola-style pith helmet from the Second World War era.

The Shola-style pith helmet usually has a flattened top and thick brim with either square or rounded edges. It is easily confused with other styles of "pith helmets" that were manufactured outside India and are usually made from cork or other materials. Some shola-style pith helmets feature a crisscross quilt-stitched cloth cover. The latter had more rounded edges at the brim. The cork-style pith helmets, contrary to their misleading name, are not made out of pith; they are much thinner, heavier, and more rounded on the top.

Both styles of hats feature puggrees, air vents, khaki or white covers and green inner brim liners. Some have chin straps made of leather, in others they are made of cloth. Some Shola-style pith helmets feature a thin leather belt that runs from under the puggaree across the top. The chin strap commonly runs across the front brim. Shola pith helmets are still sold in Indian, Pakistani and Nepali polo-equipment stores, though they are seldom used in matches.

== Shola pith balls ==
Shola pith is also used to construct sola/shola pith balls, and sola/shola crepe balls, which are toys for pet birds, especially parrots, and pet rodents.

== See also ==
- Aeschynomene aspera
