= Madhalla =

Type of hat

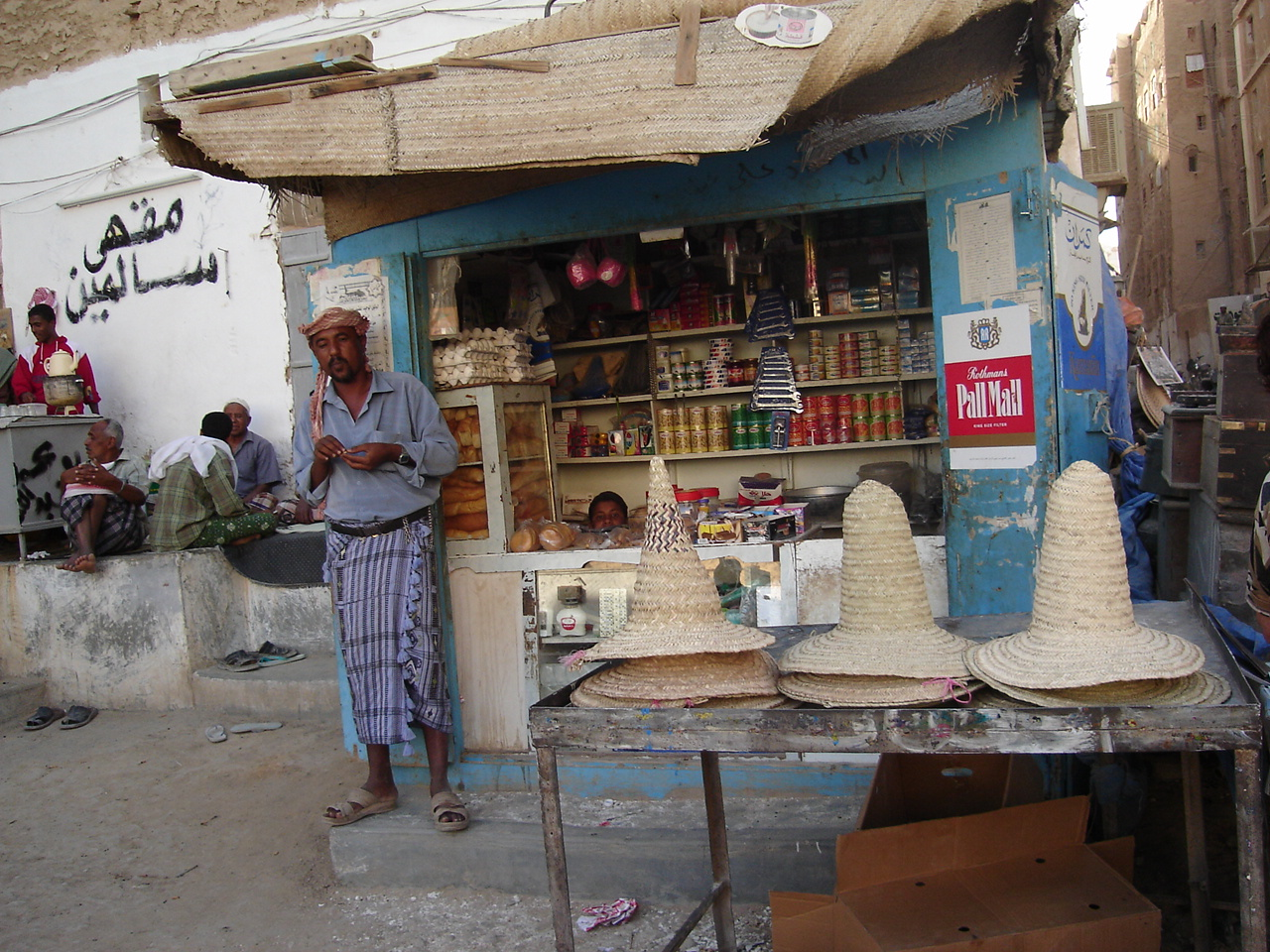
Madhalla on display in Shibam

The madhalla is a traditional hat used in Yemen and worn by women. The hats have a wide circular brim and a peaked top. The straw hats are peaked to keep the wearer cool in hot temperatures. Being almost two feet tall, the design promotes air circulation within the hat. They have been noted to resemble witch hats. It is made from plaited strips of date palm (nakhl, Arabic: نخل) leaves. They are often worn in Hadhramaut by female herders and field workers who also wear black abayas. The hat can be obtained at some souqs.

== See also ==
- Pointed hat
