= Capuchon =

Ceremonial hat worn in Mardi Gras celebrations

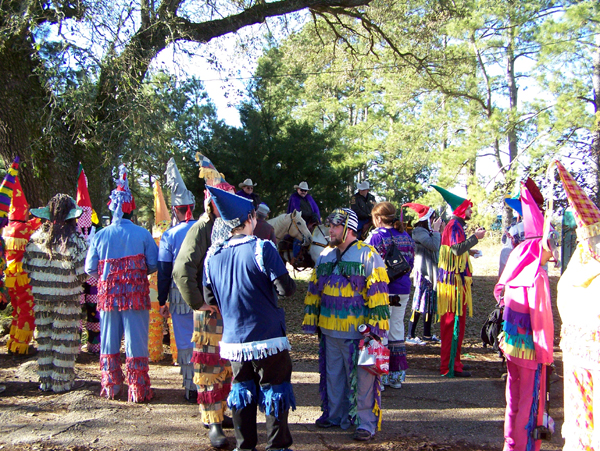
Mardi Gras celebrants wearing capuchons

A capuchon is a cone-shaped ceremonial hat worn during the Mardi Gras celebration in the Cajun areas of southern Louisiana, known as the Courir de Mardi Gras. The rural celebration is based on early begging rituals, similar to those still celebrated by mummers, wassailers and celebrants of Halloween. As Mardi Gras is the celebration of the final day before Lent, celebrants drink and eat heavily, but dress in costume, ostensibly to protect their identities.

Many of the traditional costumes are derivatives of the costumes worn in early rural France during the same celebration. The costumes directly mock the nobility, the clergy and the educated; celebrants wear miter hats, mortarboards and capuchons, which were initially designed to mock the tall pointy hats worn by noble women.

These hats are still worn, primarily by men. The name "capuchon" comes from the same root word, "cappa" in Latin, meaning a cape or hood, that gives us "cap", "cape", "cope", "chapeau" in French, Capuchin monkeys, Capuchin friars, cappuccinos and baseball caps. Chaperon (headgear) describes the development of the word. The hats are vibrantly decorated to match (or intentionally mis-match) the colorful Mardi Gras costumes that they accompany. They are often worn with a mask.

The capuchons worn by Mardi Gras celebrants are unrelated to the pointed hoods worn by the Ku Klux Klan, and predate the hoods by several hundred years.

== See also ==
- Pointed hat
- List of hat styles
- List of headgear
