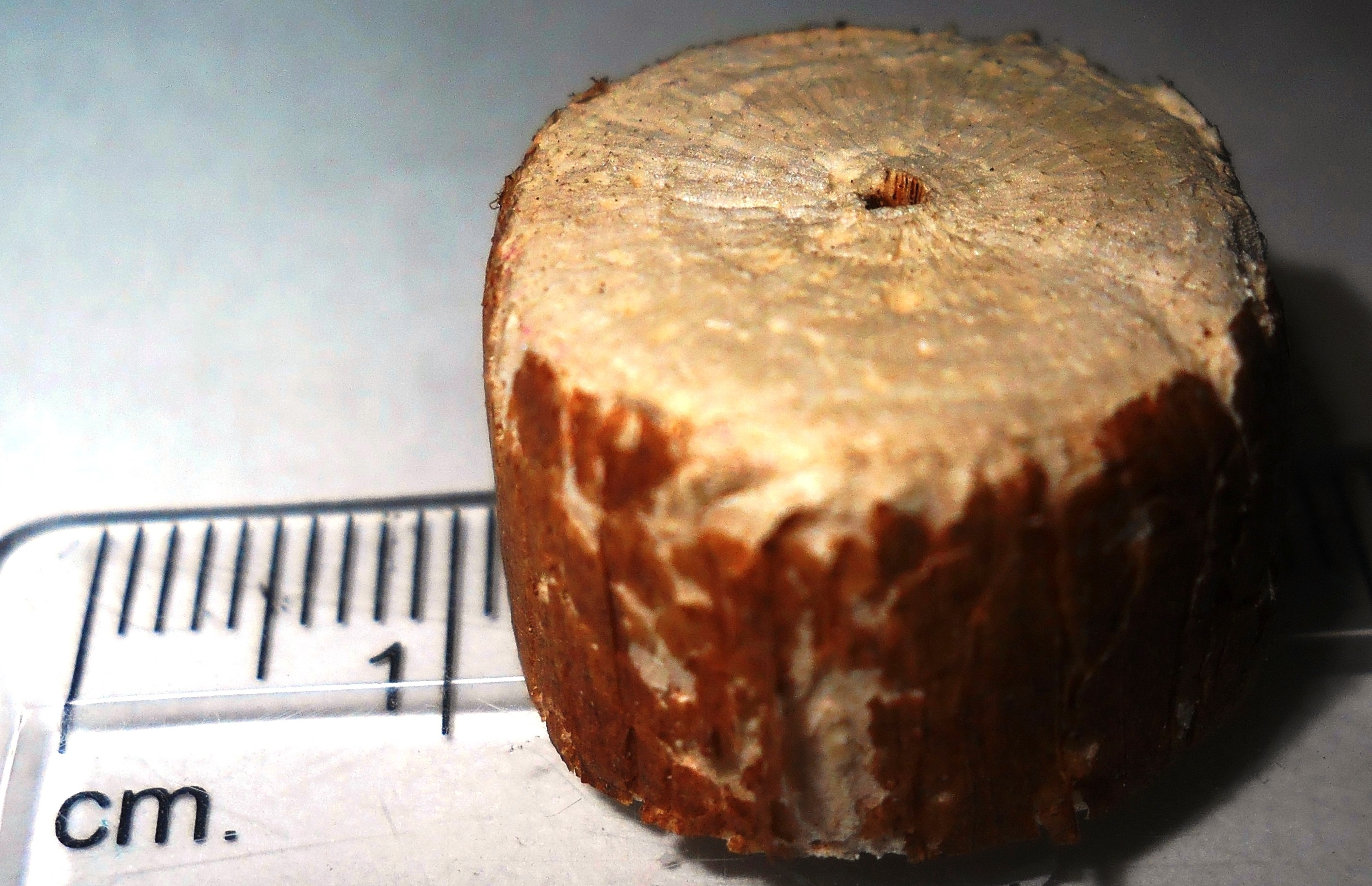
- Cross-section of A. aspera stem. Bark: very thin, reddish brown layer around stem. Wood: whitish, soft and lightweight. Center: hollow pith tube, decayed with ageing.

Scientific classification
- Kingdom: Plantae
- Clade: Tracheophytes
- Clade: Angiosperms
- Clade: Eudicots
- Clade: Rosids
- Order: Fabales
- Family: Fabaceae
- Subfamily: Faboideae
- Genus: Aeschynomene
- Species: A. aspera

Binomial name
- Aeschynomene aspera L.

Synonyms
- Aeschynomene lagenaria Lour.; Aeschynomene surattensis Wight & Arn.; Aeschynomene trachyloba Miq.; Hedysarum lagenarium (Lour.) Roxb.

= Aeschynomene aspera =

Sola

Species of plant from Tropical Asia

Aeschynomene aspera is a species of flowering plant in the family Fabaceae. It is also known by the names sola (Odia: ସୋଲ), shola (Bengali: শোলা) sola pith plant, pith plant, laugauni (Hindi), Bendu-chettu (Telugu), ponguchedi (Malayalam) or Netti (Tamil). The low density wood of this plant is used to make hats known as pith helmets or sola topis.

It is native to Bangladesh, Bhutan, Cambodia, India, Indonesia, Laos, Malaysia, Myanmar, Nepal, Pakistan, Sri Lanka, Thailand, and Vietnam.

It is an aquatic plant and is considered a minor weed of rice paddies across its range.

== Used part ==
From the biological viewpoint, the used part is the wood of the stem; the plant's name presumably comes from the similarity of its spongy wood to the soft pith of harder woody plants.

Aeschynomene spp. wood is one of the lightest woods in the world. Aeschynomene woods feel like pieces of expanded polystyrene or even lighter, and have a corky texture. They are bright white to off-white (white with a slight reddish or yellowish tinge) in color.

This corky material is used to make some traditional Indian crafts and artworks, and also decorative objects for worship, etc.

The young leaves and flowers are eaten in salads during times of famine in Cambodia, where the plant is known as snaô 'âm'bâhs (snaô="edible flowers", 'âm'bâhs="filamentous", Khmer language). In local medicine in Cambodia, it is used to treat uterine bleeding.

== Gallery ==
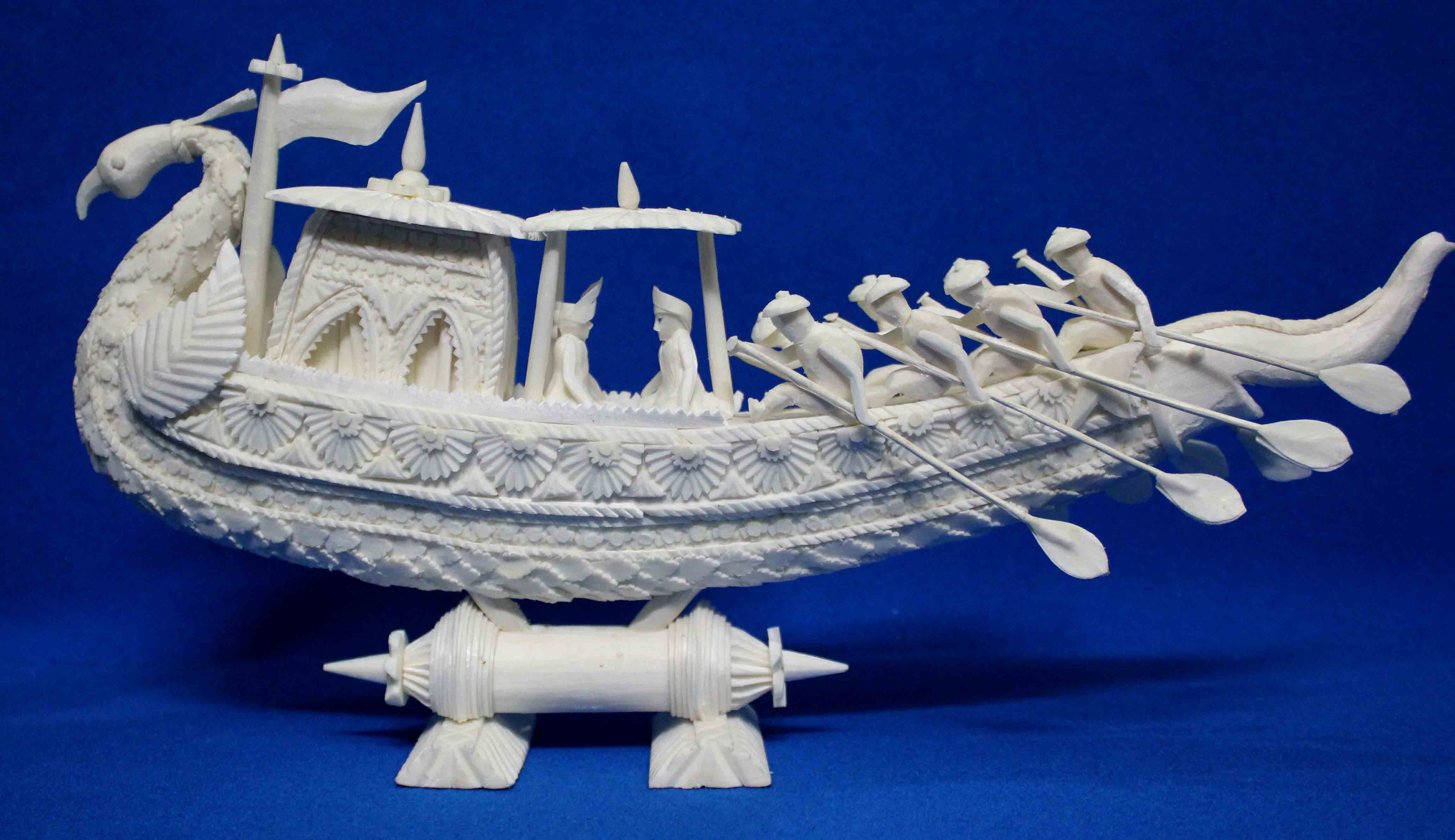
Craftwork of shola

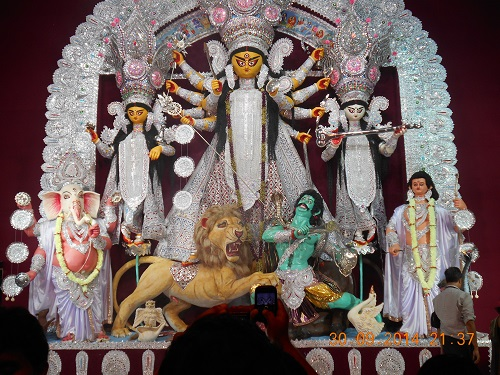
Traditional ornaments of goddess-idol made with shola-base

== See also ==
- Sholapith
