= Witch hat =

Style of hat

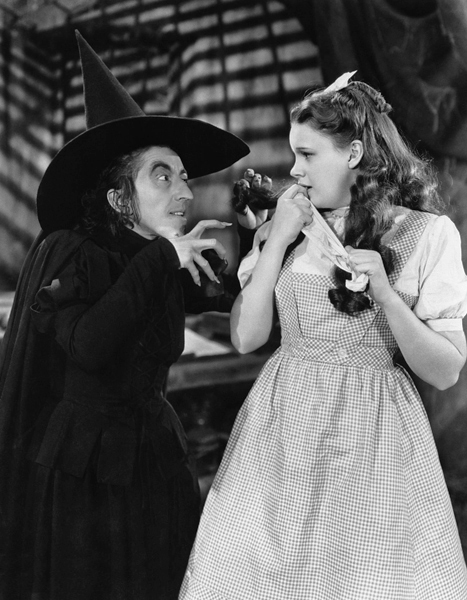
Margaret Hamilton as the Wicked Witch of the West in the 1939 film The Wizard of Oz

A witch hat is a style of hat worn by witches in popular culture depictions, characterized by a conical crown and a wide brim.

== Origins and design ==
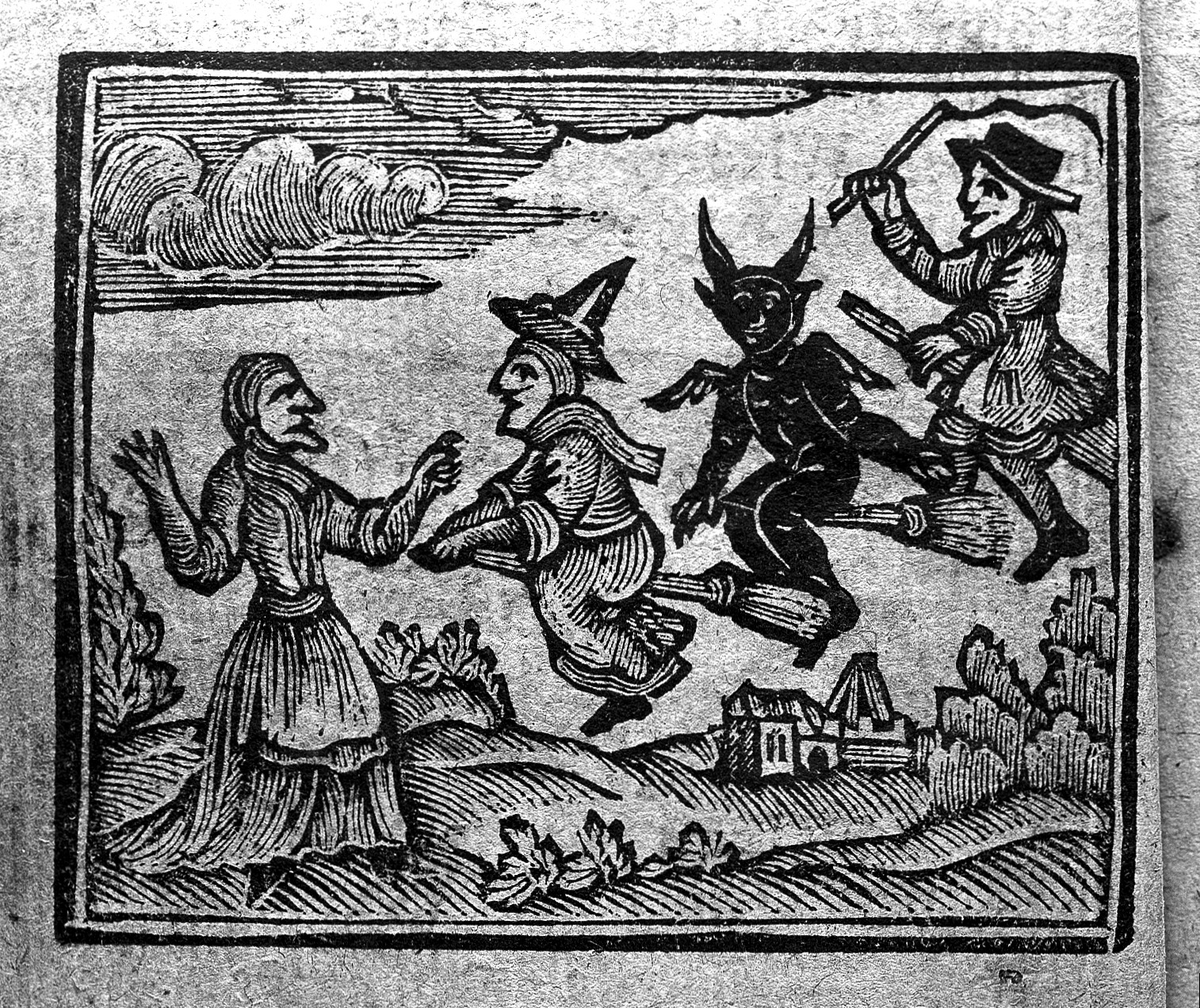
Woodcut showing a witch on a broomstick with a conical hat, from The History of Witches and Wizards (1720)

The origins of the witch hat as displayed today are disputed.

One theory is that in 1215, the Fourth Council of the Lateran issued an edict that all Jews must wear identifying headgear, a pointed cap known as a Judenhut. Potentially, this style of hat then became associated with black magic, Satan-worship and other acts of which the Jews were accused.

Another theory posits that the witch hat has origins in the phrygian cap which is associated with Mithraism, a Greek and then Roman mystery cult.

A similar theory posits that the image of the archetypal witch hat was born from anti-Quaker prejudice. Although the hats traditionally worn by Quakers themselves were not pointed, Quaker caps were a focus of cultural controversy, and it is conceivable that the Puritan backlash against Quakers in the mid-18th century contributed to hats becoming part of the iconography of the demonic.

Yet another hypothesis proposes that witch hats originated as alewife hats, distinctive headgear worn by women who home-brewed beer for sale. According to this suggestion, these hats gained negative connotations when the brewing industry, dominated by men, accused alewives of selling diluted or tainted beer. In combination with the general suspicion that women with knowledge of herbology were working in an occult domain, the alewife hat could have become associated with witchcraft.

L. Frank Baum's 1900 novel The Wonderful Wizard of Oz featured illustrations that portrayed the Wicked Witch of the West sporting a tall, conical hat. This fashion accessory was carried over for the 1939 film adaptation, in which the Wicked Witch was played by character actress Margaret Hamilton.

== In media ==
Witch hats have been worn by a number of fictional characters, including:

- The Wicked Witch of the West, from The Wonderful Wizard of Oz, 1900
- The titular witch in Le Fée Carabosse, directed by Georges Méliès, 1906
- Gandalf, from The Hobbit, 1937, and The Lord of the Rings, 1954–1955
- Jennifer from I Married a Witch, 1942
- Samantha Stephens, from Bewitched, 1964
- Orko, from He-Man and the Masters of the Universe, 1983
- Granny Weatherwax, introduced in 1987, from the Discworld series by Terry Pratchett
- Minerva McGonagall, from Harry Potter (the story includes a character that is itself such a hat), 1997. The novels also describe "pointed hats" as part of the student uniform for a school of witchcraft and wizardry, though these rarely appear in the film adaptations.

Depending upon the material in which the hat is made, the crown may regularly be observed in a flexed, bent or crumpled condition.

== See also ==
- List of hat styles
- List of headgear
- Pilos
- Pointed hat
- Welsh hat
