= Topor (headgear) =

Bengali Hindu wedding headgear

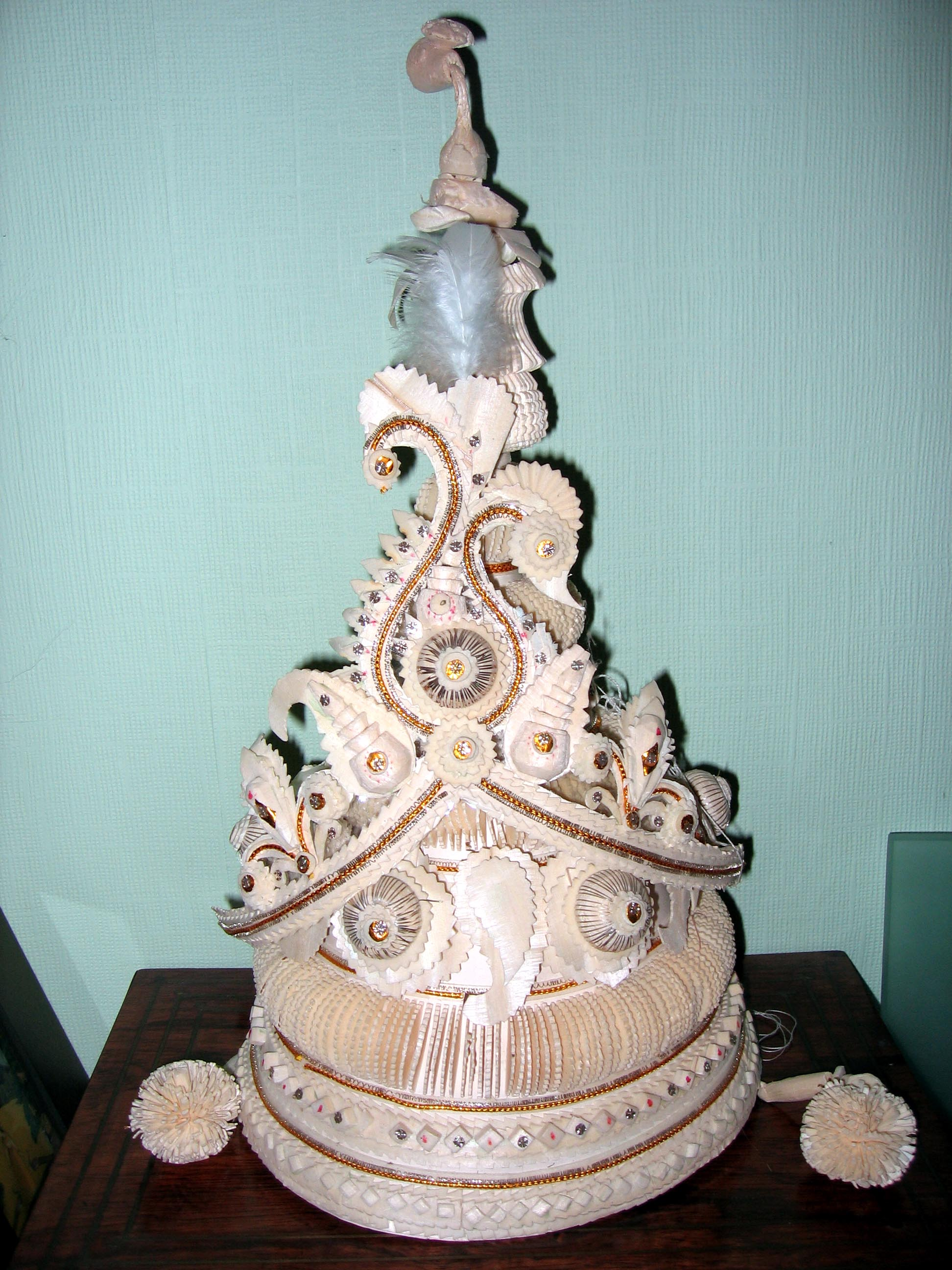

A topor (Bengali: টোপর) is a type of conical headgear traditionally worn by the Bengali groom as part of the Bengali Hindu wedding ceremony for good luck. The topor is typically fragile, made of sholapith and white in colour.

The topor is traditionally given to the groom by the bride's family. The groom dons the topor before the main ceremony begins. The bride will typically wear related, but differently-shaped, headgear (Bengali: মুকুট, mukut).

Topors are also worn by infant boys as part of the annaprashana ceremony, when they are dressed as grooms.

== Religious significance ==
According to legend, the topor was created because Shiva wanted special headgear for a wedding and gave this task to Vishvakarma, who failed as he was only specialized in handling hard materials. Shiva then assigned a malakar to make it using sholapith. The topor subsequently became a significant part of traditional Bengali Hindu weddings.
