= Dunce =

Pejorative term

Dunce is a mild insult in English meaning "a person who is slow at learning or stupid".

== Early use of the term ==
The etymology given by Richard Stanyhurst (1547-1618) is that the word is derived from the name of the Scottish scholastic theologian and philosopher John Duns Scotus. The Oxford English Dictionary (3rd edition) cites mid-16th century examples of the term dunce used to describe a follower of Duns Scotus, a person engaged in ridiculous pedantry, or a person regarded as a "fool" or "dimwit".

When in the 16th century Scotus' followers, known adjectivally as Scotists, argued against Renaissance humanism, the terms Dunsmen, duns or dunce became, in the mouths of humanists and reformers, a term of abuse and a synonym for one incapable of scholarship. The word "dunce" has come to be used as a term to describe someone dull-witted.

== Dunce cap ==
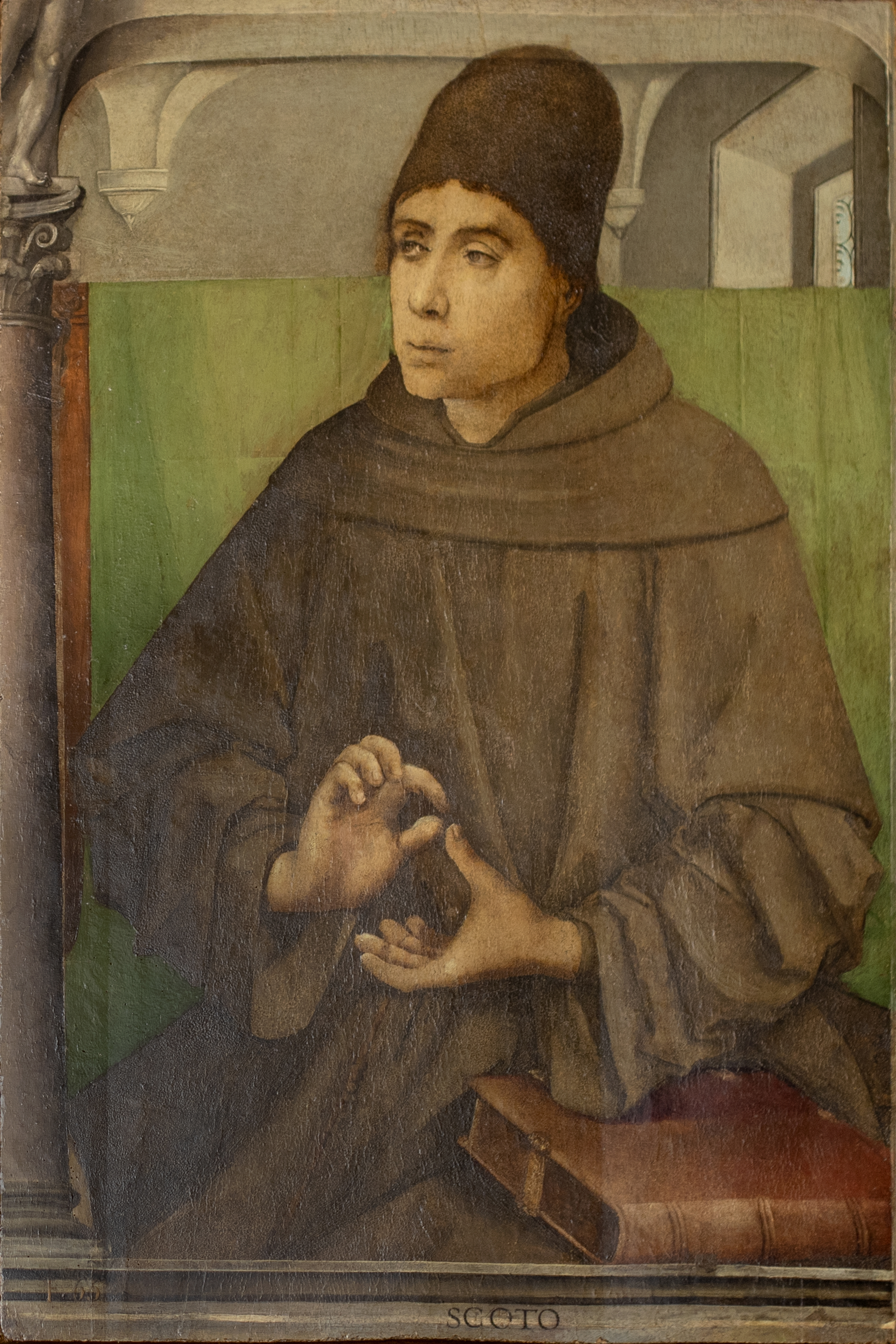
Portrait of Duns Scotus, wearing one of his caps, by Justus van Gent, c. 1476–78

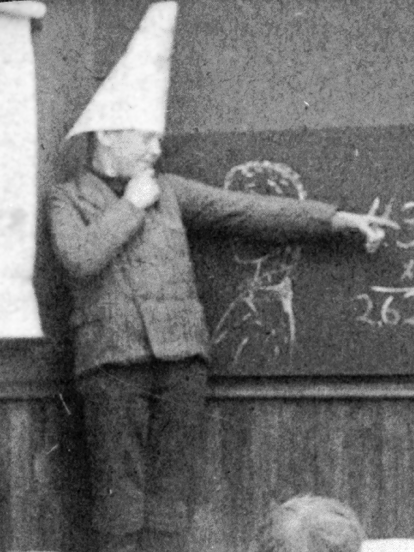
A young boy wearing a dunce cap in class, from a staged photo c. 1906

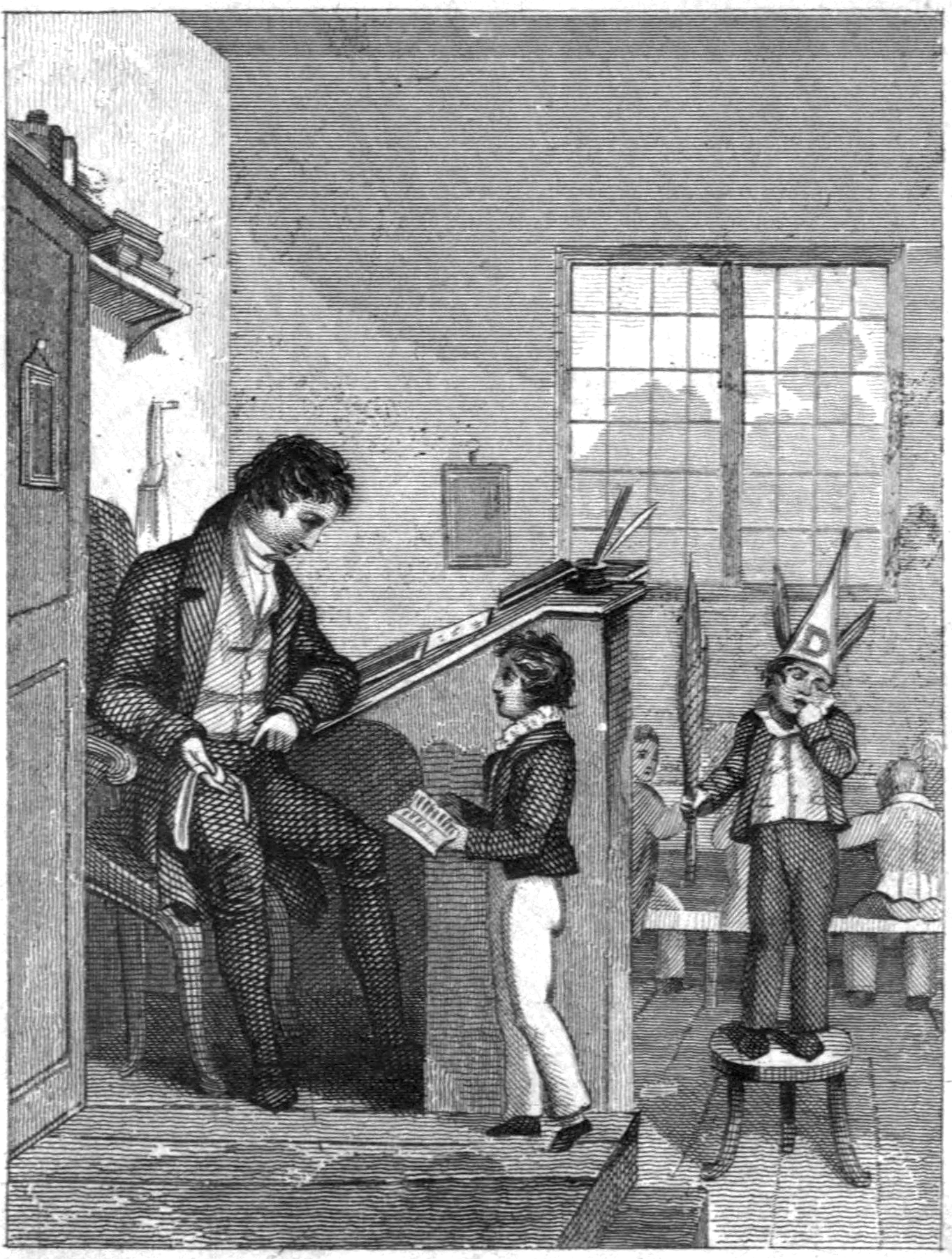
1828 engraving showing a boy standing on a stool wearing a dunce cap with the ears of a donkey

A dunce cap, also variously known as a dunce hat, dunce's cap or dunce's hat, is a pointed hat, formerly used as an article of discipline in schools in Europe and the United States—especially in the 19th and early 20th centuries—for children who were disruptive or were considered slow in learning.

Scotus, sometimes depicted as wearing pointed caps, apparently believed that a conical hat would funnel knowledge into the brain, and in the centuries before his followers became unpopular, was a social signal of an intelligent person. A similar cap made of paper and called a capirote was prescribed for sinners and penitents during the Spanish Inquisition.

A visual depiction of the hat was first shown in the 1727 edition of The New England Primer, and the term dunce's cap is recorded as early as 1791. The first use of the term in literature was in 1840, in Charles Dickens' The Old Curiosity Shop.

In the 19th century, it was seen by some as degrading: in 1831, children's book author Sidney Babcock wrote of the dunce cap as debasing and harsh and, in 1899, historian Alice Morse Earle compared it to other forms of school discipline she saw as degrading and outdated. It became unpopular in the early 20th century. However, some North American schools still permitted caps as late as the 1950s. In modern pedagogy, punishments like dunce caps have fallen out of favor: By 1927, an editorial in the Educational Research Bulletin stated: "The rod and the cap were not eminently successful ... we have our doubts about exclusion being the solution to the problem. ... High scholarship is not produced by students who have their curiosity stifled by their teachers. Curiosity must be stimulated if scholarship is desired, and sympathy is essential to this stimulation."

The dunce cap has also been connected with donkeys to portray the student as asinine. An engraving featured in an early 1900s textbook depicts a child sitting on a wooden donkey in an "eighteenth-century" classroom, wearing a dunce cap with donkey ears.

The dunce cap was also used to humiliate intellectuals and officials during the Cultural Revolution in China during the Maoist era.

== See also ==
- Capirote – although with the same shape, the Capirote has no derogatory meaning
- Fool's cap
- List of hat styles
- Sanbenito
- Tin foil hat
- Donkeys in France
