= Pith =

Plant tissue

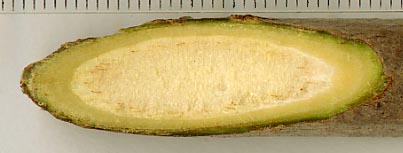
Elder shoot cut longitudinally to show the broad, solid pith (rough textured, white) inside the wood (smooth, yellow tinged). Scale in millimeters.

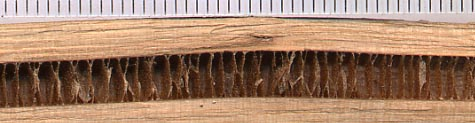
Walnut shoot cut longitudinally to show the chambered pith found in this genus. Scale in millimeters.

Pith, or medulla, is a tissue in the stems of vascular plants. Pith is composed of soft, spongy parenchyma cells, which in some cases can store starch. In eudicotyledons, pith is located in the center of the stem. In monocotyledons, it extends only into roots. The pith is encircled by a ring of xylem; the xylem, in turn, is encircled by a ring of phloem.

While new pith growth is usually white or pale in color, as the tissue ages it commonly darkens to a deeper brown color. In trees pith is generally present in young growth, but in the trunk and older branches the pith often gets replaced – in great part – by xylem. In some plants, the pith in the middle of the stem may dry out and disintegrate, resulting in a hollow stem. A few plants, such as walnuts, have distinctive chambered pith with numerous short cavities. The cells in the peripheral parts of the pith may, in some plants, develop to be different from cells in the rest of the pith. This layer of cells is then called the perimedullary region of the pithamus. An example of this can be observed in Hedera helix, a species of ivy.

The term pith is also used to refer to the pale, spongy inner layer of the rind, more properly called mesocarp or albedo, of citrus fruits (such as oranges) and other hesperidia. The word comes from the Old English word piþa, meaning substance, akin to Middle Dutch pitte (modern Dutch pit), meaning the pit of a fruit.

== Uses ==
=== Food ===
The pith of the sago palm, although highly toxic to animals in its raw form, is an important human food source in Melanesia and Micronesia by virtue of its starch content and its availability. There is a simple process of starch extraction from sago pith that leaches away a sufficient amount of the toxins and thus only the starch component is consumed. Current processes for starch extraction are generally only about 50% efficient, however, with the other half remaining in residual pith waste. The form of the starch after processing is similar to tapioca.

Other foods sometimes mistakenly called piths include heart of palm (actually the core of the bud) and banana piths (actually the rolled up young leaves).

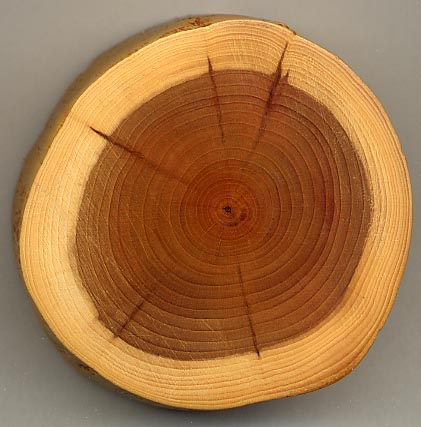
The tiny central dark spot (diameter: about 1 millimeter (0.039 in)) in this yew wood is the pith.

=== Pith helmets ===
The spongy wood of the pith wood plant or other similar species, often mistakenly called pith, was once used to make pith helmets.

=== Watch cleaning ===
Pith wood is a cleaning tool used in watchmaking to clean watch parts and tools. It is used to remove oil from the tips of tools to prevent the contamination of watch movements. A pith wood consists of a piece of pith (such as elder or mullein).

=== Light ===
Dried pith (which is actually the center of the leaf) of certain rush plants soaked in fat or grease, held using a rushlight, was used as home lighting. Beginning in the 17th century, it would continue to be used in this method until the mid-20th century. It saw a brief revival during World War 2.

== See also ==
- Papyrus
