= Tantur =

"Tantur" (from Arabic: الطنطورة, al-Tantura, lit. The Peak/Hill) may refer to:

- Tantur Ecumenical Institute: An institute of advanced theological research in ecumenism located on Tantur hill in Jerusalem, near Bethlehem.
- Tantour: a conical headdress in traditional Lebanese culture
- Tantura: a fishing village on the Israeli coast, build upon the Phoenician city of Dor.
