= The Ugly Duchess =

Painting by Quentin Matsys

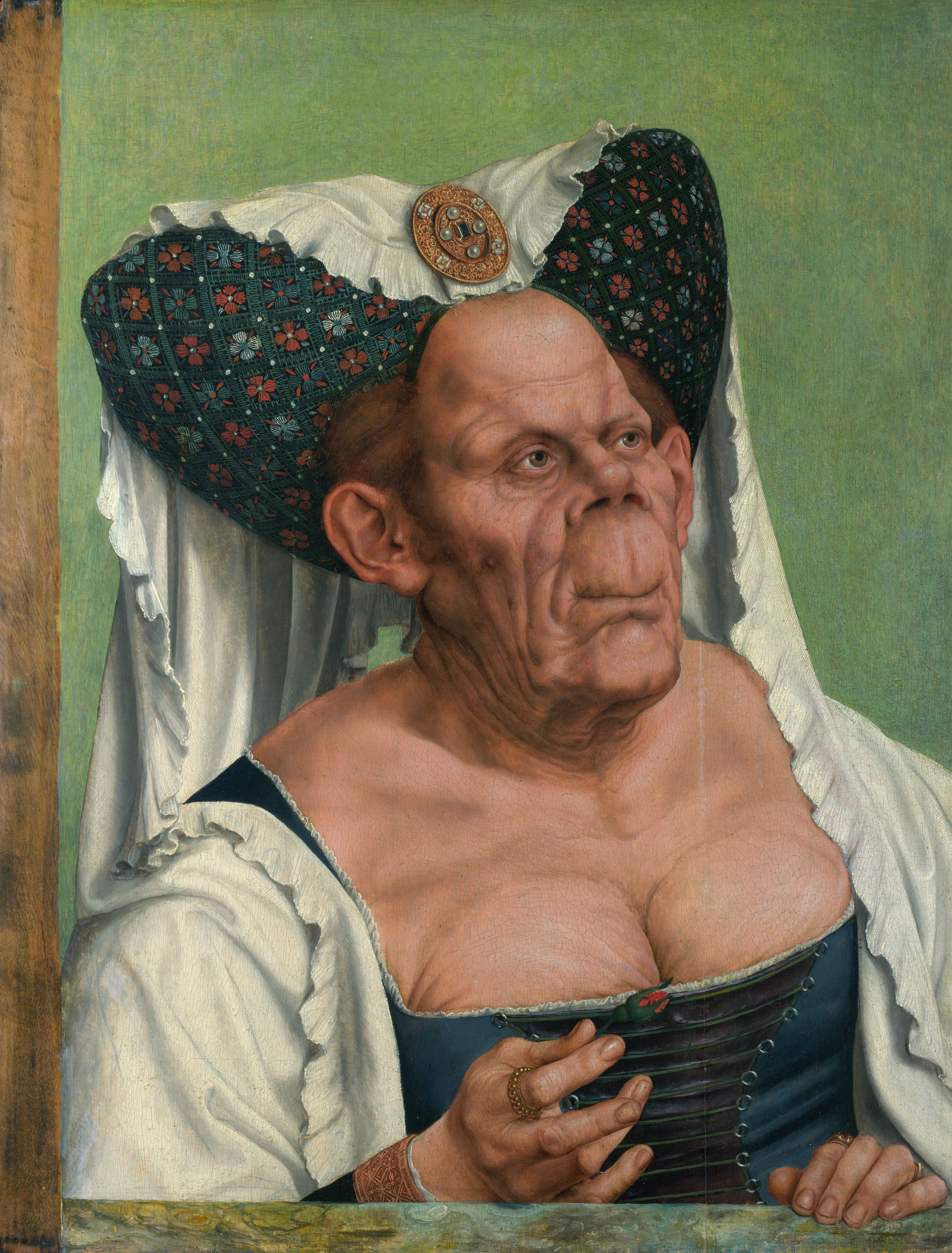
The Ugly Duchess aka "A Grotesque old Woman", 1513 64.2 × 45.5 cm. National Gallery, London

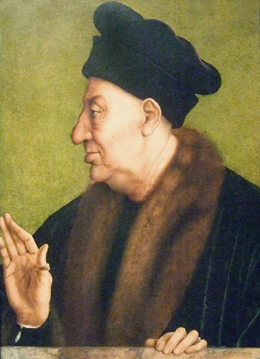
Portrait of an Old Man, private collection

The Ugly Duchess (also known as A Grotesque Old Woman) is a satirical portrait painted by the Flemish artist Quinten Matsys around 1513.

The painting is in oil on an oak panel, measuring 62.4 by 45.5 cm. It shows an old woman with wrinkled skin and withered breasts. She wears the aristocratic horned headdress (escoffion) of her youth, out of fashion by the time of the painting, and holds in her right hand a red flower, then a symbol of engagement, indicating that she is trying to attract a suitor. However, it has been described as a bud that will 'likely never blossom'. The work is Matsys' best-known painting.

The painting was long thought to have been derived from a putative lost work by Leonardo da Vinci, on the basis of its striking resemblance to two caricature drawings of heads commonly attributed to the Italian artist. However the caricatures are now thought to be based on the work of Matsys, who is known to have exchanged drawings with Leonardo.

A possible literary influence is Erasmus's essay In Praise of Folly (1511), which satirizes women who "still play the coquette", "cannot tear themselves away from their mirrors" and "do not hesitate to exhibit their repulsive withered breasts". The woman has been often identified as Margaret, Countess of Tyrol, claimed by her enemies to be ugly; however, she had died 150 years earlier.

The painting is in the collection of the National Gallery in London, to which it was bequeathed by Jenny Louisa Roberta Blaker in 1947. It was originally half of a diptych, with a Portrait of an Old Man. In a private collection, it has a study in the Musée Jacquemart-André, Paris, which was lent to the National Gallery in 2008 for an exhibition in which the two paintings were hung side by side.

The portrait is thought to be a source for John Tenniel's 1865 illustrations of the Duchess in Alice's Adventures in Wonderland.

A 1989 article published in the British Medical Journal speculated that the subject might have suffered from Paget's disease, in which the victim's bones enlarge and become deformed. A similar suggestion was made by Michael Baum, emeritus professor of surgery at University College London.

== Description ==
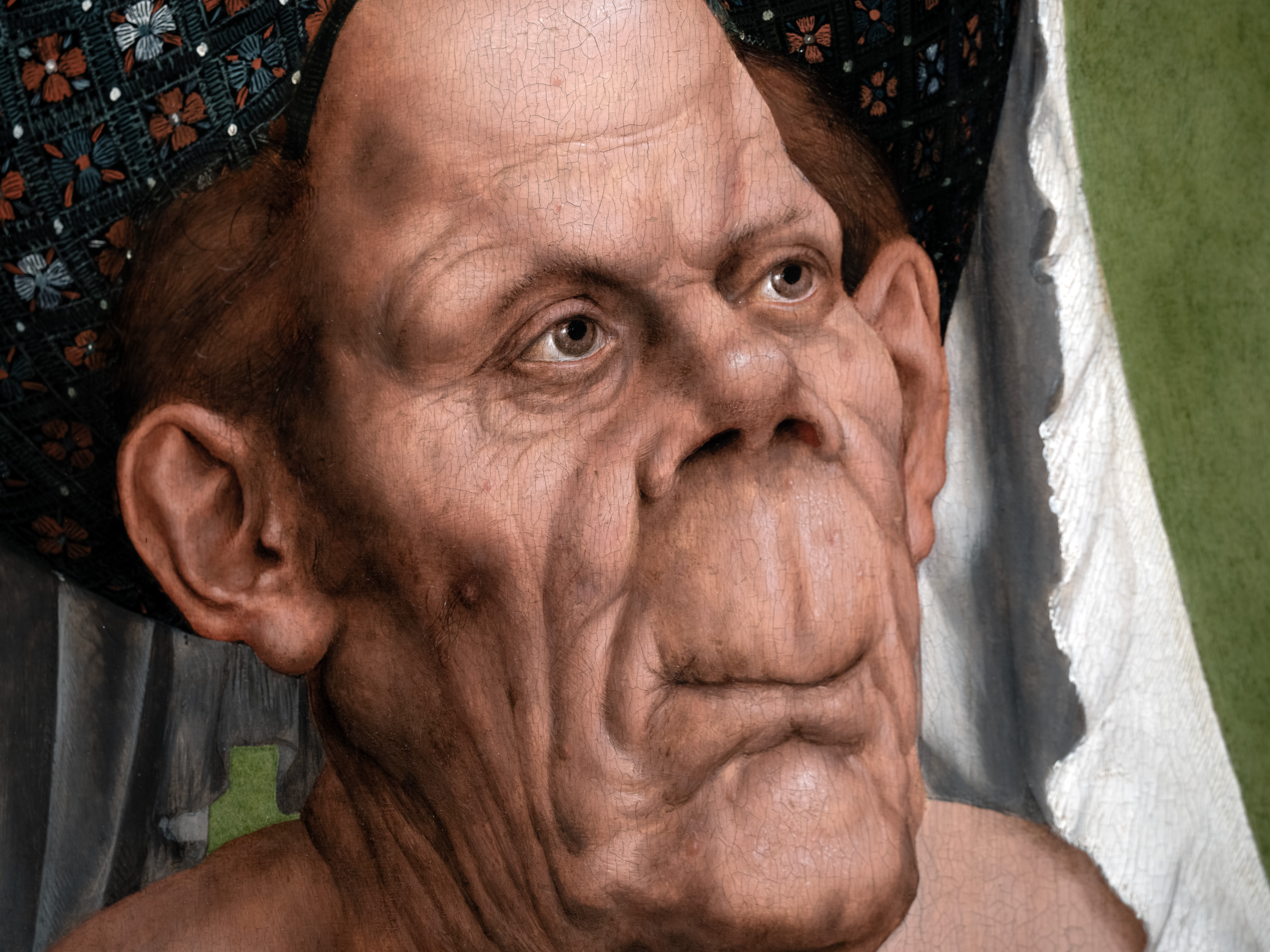
Face detail

The painting is in oil on an oak panel, measures 62.4 by 45.5 cm. It shows an old woman depicted with exaggerated features. She has a short nose with upturned flared nostrils. Her philtral area is elongated, and her lips appear thin and pinched. The skin of her cheeks, neck and jaw hang loose on her face. The rest of her skin is wrinkled and pocked, and she has a wart on the right side of her face. Her thinning hair, concealed by an escoffion or horned headdress, is swept behind protruding ears. Despite her seemingly "ugly" visage, she wears aristocratic fashion that is more relevant to her youth rather than her advanced age. Her clothing is an adaptation of traditional Burgundian fashion, popular between 1400 and 1500. By the time Matsys completed this work, in 1513, this style of dress was already out of fashion. Her dress, with tightly laced corseted front, pushes her wrinkled breasts up beyond propriety standards for the period. Her shoulders are covered by a white veil, that falls from her escoffion headdress. It is decorated in roses and ornamented by a large gold and pearl brooch. Her fine, but out of fashion, clothing suggests she was a wealthy woman. Additionally, she holds a red flower in her right hand. At one time a red flower symbolized engagement, or courting. With her ugly features and advanced age, this red flower only adds to the satirical nature of Matsys's work.

== Technical analysis ==
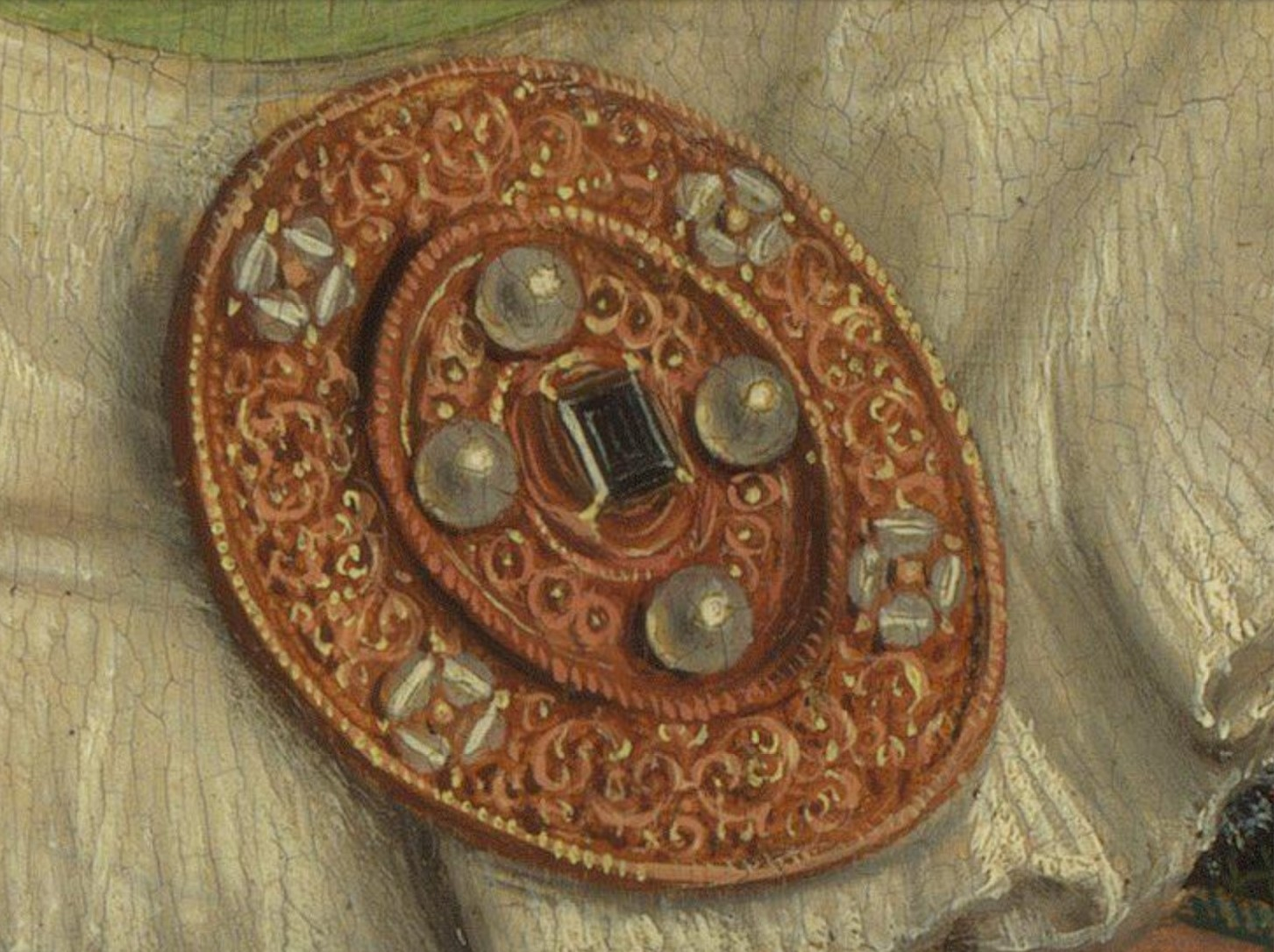
Detailed close-up of the ornamental brooch featured in Matsys's work, The Ugly Duchess. Shows the fine brushwork and layered colorwork.

The painting technique reflects Matsys himself and is similar to his other work. The paint is worked in many places wet-in-wet and has been dragged and feathered. Matsys popularly used feathering to soften and blend transitions of tone. The hair near the Duchess's right ear and the embroidery on her right cuff are rendered in sgraffito, a technique done by scratching through a layer of wet paint to show the underlying layers. Matsys achieved the uneven appearance of her flesh by layering the basic pink with red and white dots in sporadic dashes and blotches. Matsys displays finer attention to detail through his brushwork when looking at the ornamental brooch. In the brooch are at least five shades of brown, orange, pink and yellow to achieve its golden hue.

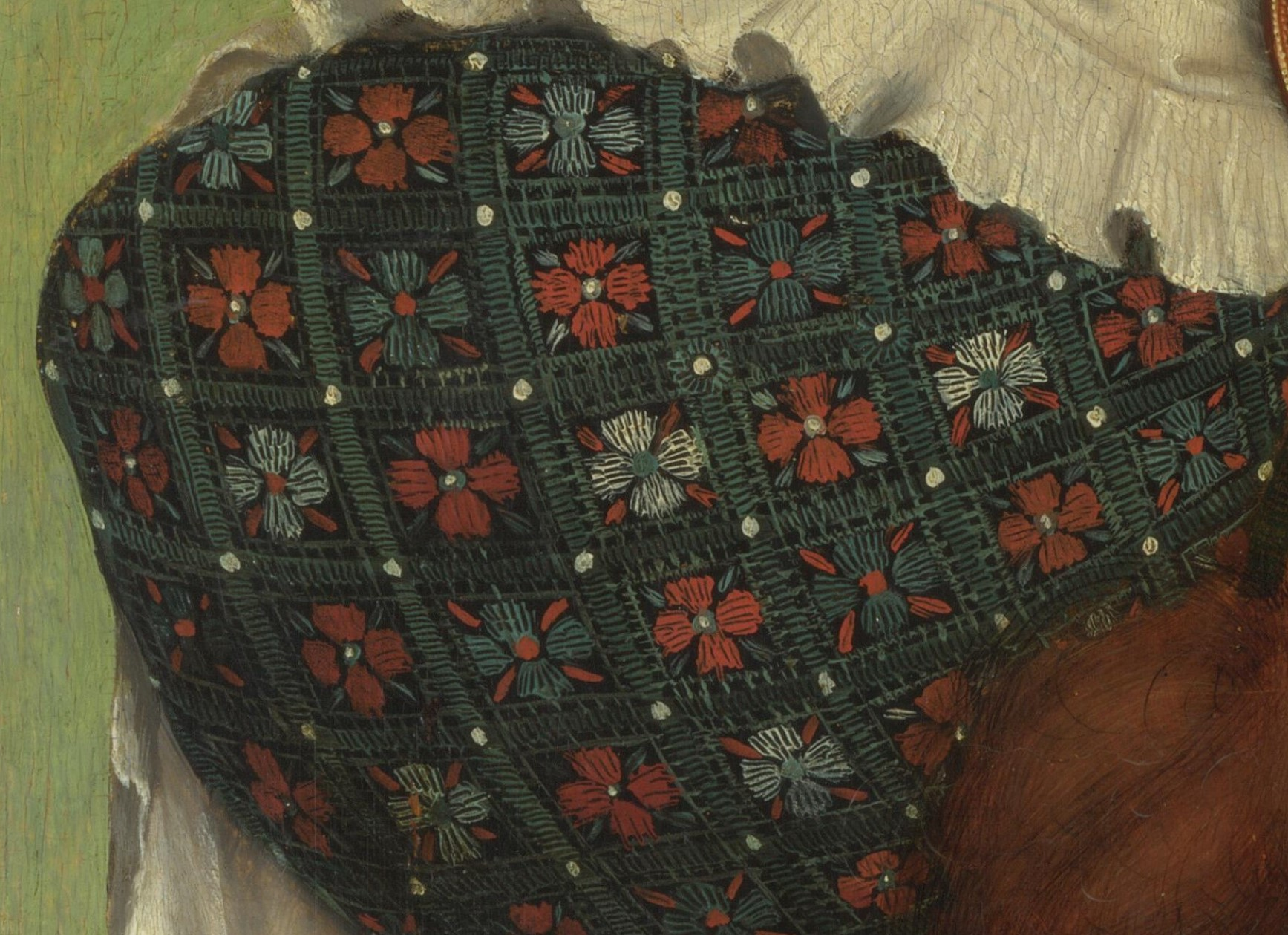
Detailed close-up of the horned headdress in Matsys's work, The Ugly Duchess. Produced using the sgraffito method.

Infrared analysis of the painting shows that the face was carefully done, whereas the clothes and other elements were freer and more sketchy. For the face, Matsys may have carefully followed a preliminary drawing but made several changes. He drew the eyes twice, moving them slightly higher and to the right. He then decreased the final appearance of the chin, neck and right ear, visible by comparing the paint to the under drawing. Another change between the under drawing and paint are the right shoulder and both hands, which were shifted and differently posed.

Matsys painted the two horns of the headdress by different methods. On the right, the horn's stripes were made by sgraffito. He removed the red, white and blue to reveal the black layer underneath. The horn on the left, Matsys used the reverse method. He applied black paint on top of a multicolored layer. Though the work is largely attributed to Quentin Matsys, he did have a collection of assistants assisting him. The inconsistencies and changes in method could be attributed to the work of different assistants, or perhaps reflect a change in method from Matsys himself.

== Interpretation ==
=== Satire ===
The woman depicted is dressed in the finest clothes, and holds a red flower that symbolizes engagement. She is fit to represent youth, but her grotesque appearance makes that impossible. Scholars today consider this a satire on material culture, especially preying on the elderly or those obsessed with maintaining a youthful appearance. Her appearance prompts the audience to consider the relationship between internal and external beauty. Externally, based on her exquisite dress, jeweled accessories, and budding flower, this woman was theoretically beautiful. However, her internal beauty is reflected in her exaggerated and displeasing physical appearance. Refer also to Erasmus's essay In Praise of Folly (1511), which satirizes women who "still play the coquette", "cannot tear themselves away from their mirrors" and "do not hesitate to exhibit their repulsive withered breasts". With the completion date estimated to be 1513 for The Ugly Duchess it is highly likely that Erasmus's essay influenced Matsys's production.

=== Paget's disease ===
In 1877 Sir James Paget observed a medical disorder where the bones became inflamed and malformed. He formally coined the condition osteitis deformans, but by the end of the century it became known as Paget's disease. Though formal identification of the disease did not exist until 1877, there are accounts that suggest it's been around for far longer. Scholars now are using The Ugly Duchess to show that the disease existed as early as the 16th century. A 1989 article published in the British Medical Journal and emeritus professor of surgery at University College London, Michael Baum also offer speculation on the Duchess's diagnosis with Paget's.

While much of the discussion concerning Paget's disease focuses on the physical representation of the condition, scholar Sarah Newman suggests that the portrait also provides cultural insight into how disability was viewed in the sixteenth century. She argues that the portrait reflects a cultural transition from an earlier model of disability, where it was typically depicted exclusively as extreme or abnormal, to a more familiar model, one which depicts individuals engaged in daily commercial or personal activities that do not strike the viewer as exceptionally abnormal. Newman's study contributes to understanding Matsys and the broader Dutch allegorical and portraiture traditions, and shows the value of historic representations in the broader study of disability.

Historian Gretchen E. Henderson's book Ugliness: A Cultural History follows a similar line of discussion, but focuses on the interpretation of disability in artwork. Henderson presents the idea that, with focus on disability, the interpretation of The Ugly Duchess becomes more sympathetic rather than a study in satire. As a sufferer of Paget's disease, the woman no longer appears the fool holding a red blossom that will never bloom, but a victim of unfortunate circumstances. These alternative interpretations rely on the assumption that Matsys used a live model for this portrait. While many possible identities have been suggested for the woman, none are convincing.

=== Crossdresser theory ===
Art curator Emma Capron has theorized that the subject is actually a man dressed as a woman, in the context of a carnival tradition- the moresca- which often involved a crossdressed man comically playing the role of a sought-after young woman. Capron noted Matsys's interest in carnivals and disagreed that the painting represented any disease. Furthermore, she also notes that the old man in the other half of the diptych may be raising his hand so as to reject "her" romance, since he realizes his companion is a crossdressed man.

== Influence ==
=== Quentin Matsys and Leonardo Da Vinci ===
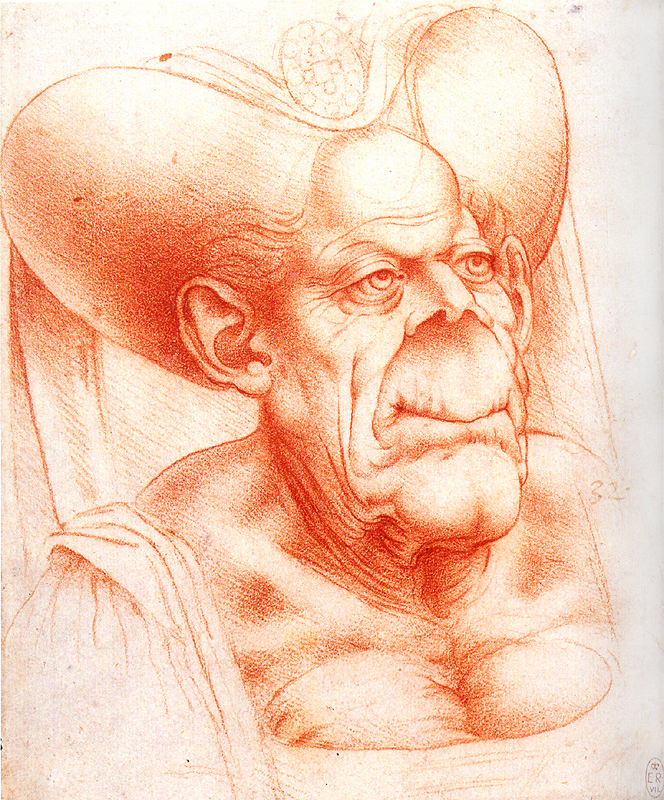
Grotesque Head, Leonardo da Vinci. Red chalk on paper, 17.2 × 14.3 cm

In 1490, Leonardo da Vinci created a series of sketches he called Grotesque Heads. Included in that series was a sketch that looked remarkably similar to Matsys's Ugly Duchess. With the earlier creation date there is some debate as to who the original creator is. It is well known that Matsys and da Vinci corresponded and shared work during their careers. When the Duchess was completed, many attributed its influence to the work of da Vinci since he already had a collection of caricature heads. However, when considering the under drawing and primary sketches beneath the paint, scholars now believe that Matsys had created the Duchess long before the portrait's completion. The now popular theory is that Matsys sent da Vinci an early sketch that then inspired the Italian artist to copy the exaggerated form of the woman's grotesque features.

=== John Tenniel's illustration in Alice's Adventures in Wonderland ===
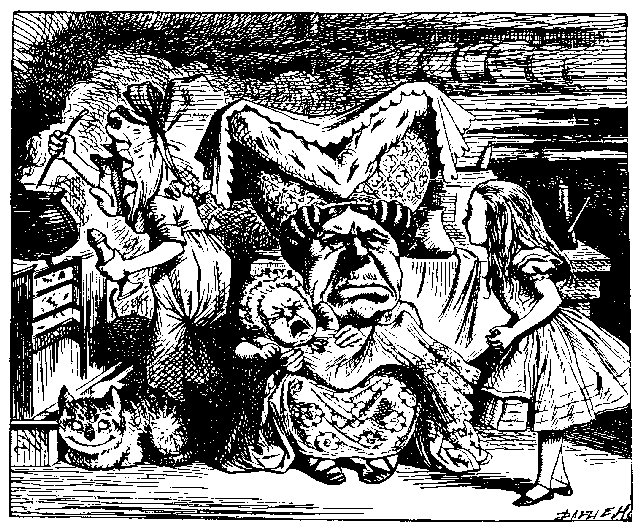
John Tenniel's illustration of the Duchess from Alice's Adventures in Wonderland, 1865

Many scholars today believe that Matsys influenced John Tenniel's illustration of the Duchess in Alice's Adventures in Wonderland. Author Lewis Carroll did not explicitly describe the Duchess's face in his book. Carroll described the character in chapter nine, stating "Alice did not much like keeping so close to her: first, because the Duchess was very ugly; and secondly, because she was exactly the right height to rest her chin upon Alice’s shoulder, and it was an uncomfortably sharp chin." Rather than finding inspiration in Carroll's writing, Tenniel turned to the portrait of The Ugly Duchess. There are differences, Tenniel softened some of the harshness found in Matsys's work. Tenniel's Duchess has a lower headdress, and the large ears, leathery neck and breasts prominent in the original portrait, are concealed. Tenniel presents an ugly woman, but not a frightening one. She will upset children, much like the one she is holding in the illustration and the girl (Alice) who is looking at her and also talking to her, but she will not scare them like her predecessor.

== Provenance ==
Completed in 1513 as half of a diptych, with a Portrait of an Old Man. The portraits were at one point separated and fell into private collections. In 1920 The Ugly Duchess appeared at auction in New York City, New York. Later, in 1947, Jenny Louisa Roberta Blaker bequeathed the portrait to The National Gallery in London where it remains today.

== Gallery ==
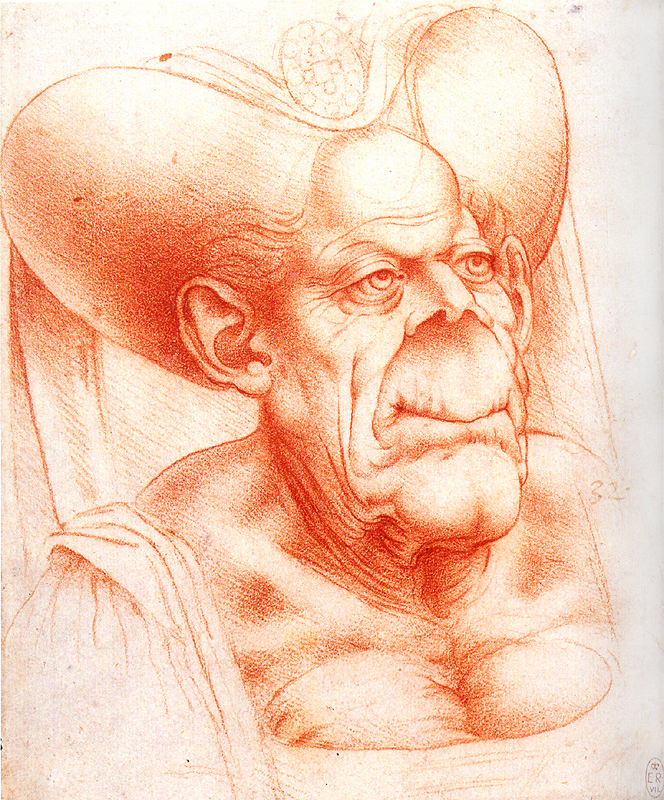
Grotesque Head, Leonardo da Vinci. Red chalk on paper, 17.2 × 14.3 cm

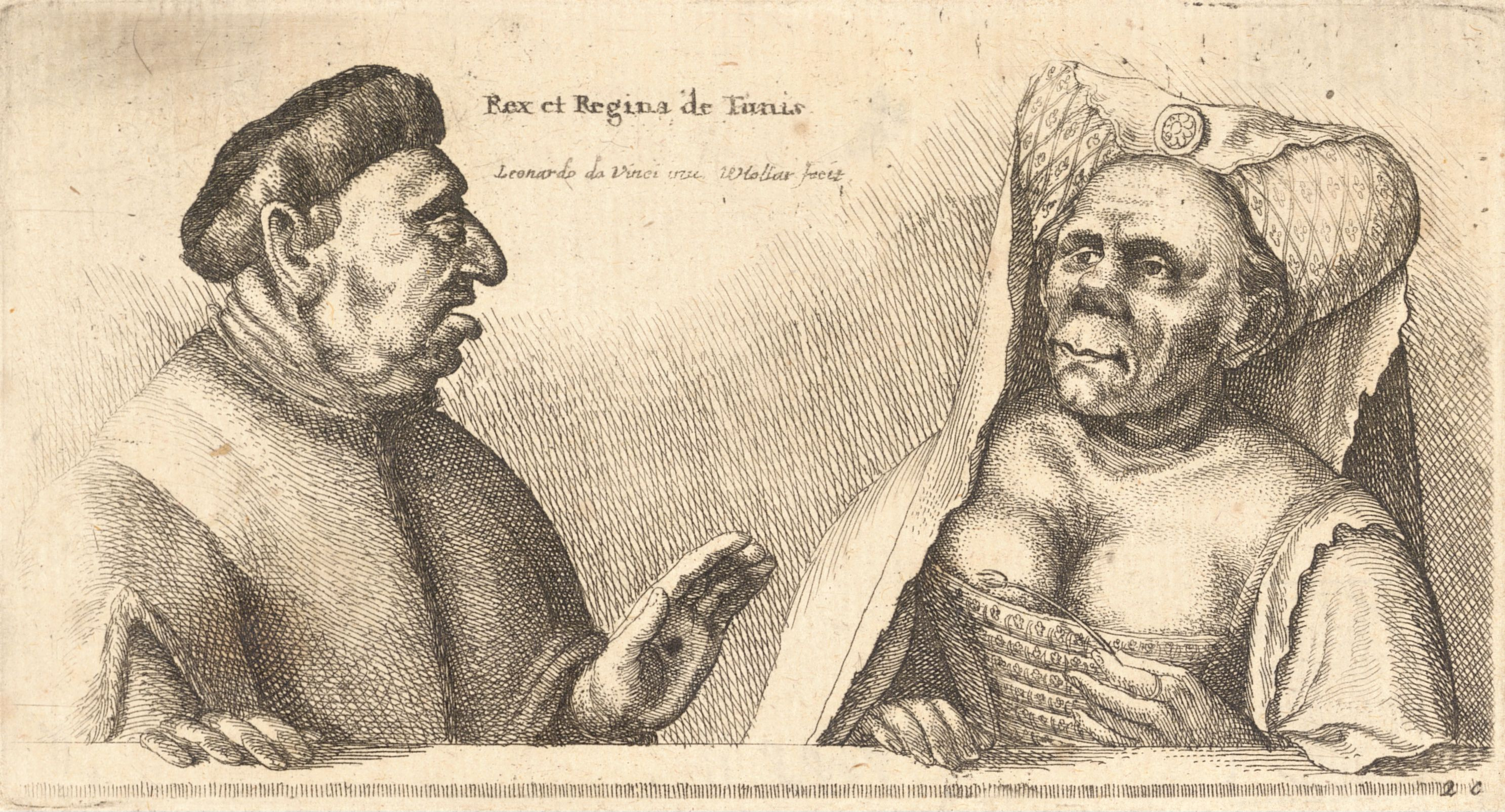
King and Queen of Tunis, Wenzel Hollar (1607–1677)

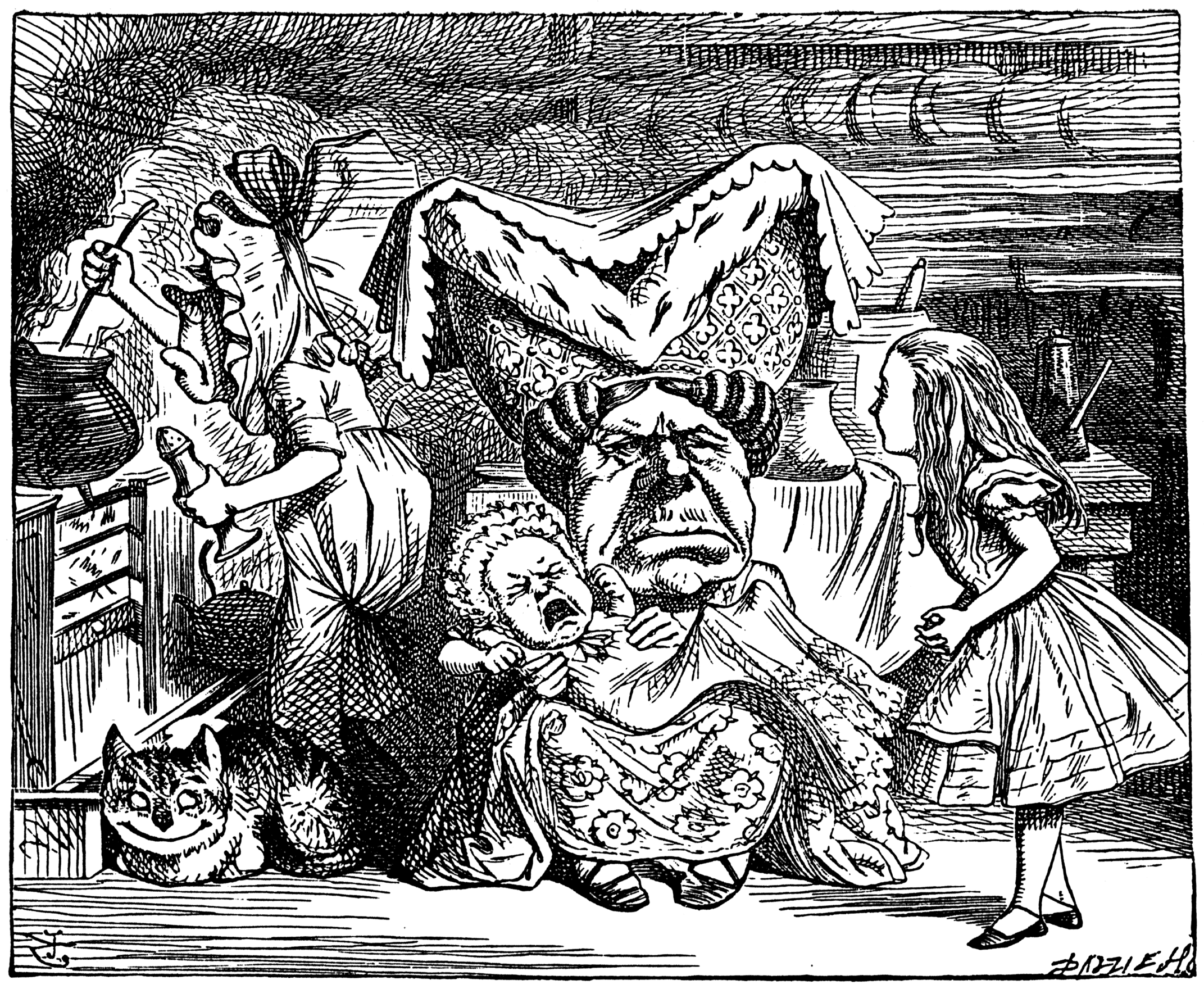
John Tenniel's illustration of the Duchess from Alice's Adventures in Wonderland, 1865
