= Gabriel Móger =

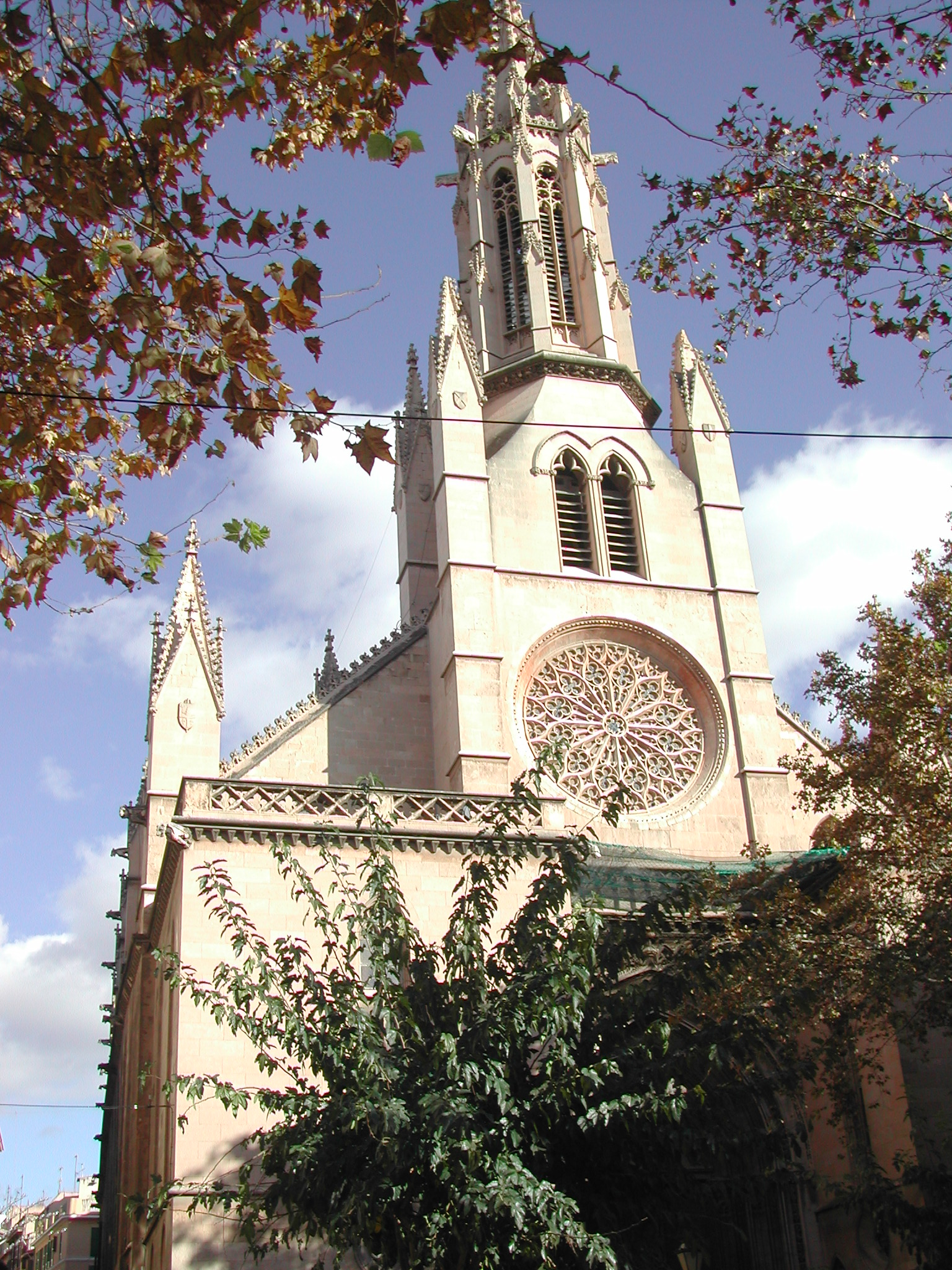
Santa Eulàlia de Palma, which contains some of Móger's work

Gabriel Móger or Mòger (1379/1384 – before December 1439) was a Mallorcan painter, sculptor, and poet. He was employed primarily for work on retables and altarpieces by the churches of Mallorca. Though Móger's active painting career can be dated to 1426–1438 on the basis of surviving documents, his poetic encounter took place some years earlier. A document of 8 March 1404 calls him minor xxv annis et maior tamen xx (less than twenty-five years old and greater than twenty). By 2 January 1414 he was married and the poem was most likely composed between those dates.

Móger painted an "angel concert"-themed altarpiece, with two musicians on the lute and rebec, in an unknown year. In 1438 Móger was commissioned to incorporate an Early Netherlandish imago pietatis into the predella of the retable of the high altar in the church of Santa Eulàlia in the Ciutat. The painter Gabriel Móger is easily confused with another Mallorcan artist of the same name, who flourished between 1460 and 1509.

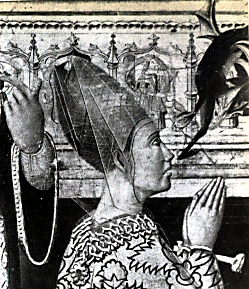
Woman wearing the lonch cap diformat of Móger's poem

Móger composed a poetic debate, or tenso, with Gabriel Ferruç in the Ciutat. The poem opens with Móger's line Seny'En Ferruç, vos qui tenit procura. The heart of the debate is Ferruç' badmouthing Mallorcan ladies, whom Móger intends to defend. The women are so angry, he alleges, that they want to kick Ferruç to death with their cork shoes. Ferruç responds that he will not recant, even if it means death, since the ladies of the city would be only further vilified for killing a man who spoke the truth. Móger reminds Ferruç that the ladies he is insulting are distinguished women with the lonch cap diformat, some type of hat, probably a kind of divided hennin like those Vicent Ferrer condemned in his sermons. Ferruç alludes to Móger's occupation when he responds that at least his adversary can comprehend his reasons sense pintura ... larch presich (without being painted a long sermon). The women look to him like cogulhades ab lur cap mal pastat. This is the crux of the debate: Ferruç finds the Mallorca headwear makes the women look like crested larks (cogulhades). The debate concludes on a violent note, unusual for tensos of its time but in keeping with its general tone.
