= Thomas Conecte =

French preacher active in the 15th century

Thomas Conecte (died 1434) was a French Carmelite friar and preacher.

== Biography ==
Born in Rennes, Conecte travelled through Cambrai, Tournai, Arras, Flanders, and Picardy, his sermons vehemently denouncing the vices of the clergy and the extravagant dress of the women, especially their lofty head-dresses, or hennins. He ventured to teach that he who is a true servant of God need fear no papal curse, that the Roman Catholic hierarchy is corrupt, and that marriage is permissible to the clergy, of whom only some have the gift of continence.

Having inveighed against the disedifying life of certain priests, he had to seek safety in flight and left France for Italy. He was listened to by immense congregations, and in Italy, despite the opposition of Nicholas Kenton (died 1468), provincial of the English Carmelites, he introduced several changes into the rules of that order. He introduced a strict observance in the convent near Florence, which gradually developed into the Congregation of Mantua. He visited this latter convent in 1432 and then proceeded to Venice, and finally to Rome, where the manners of the Curia provoked anew his violent language and occasioned a charge of conspiracy against the pope.

He was finally apprehended by order of Pope Eugene IV, condemned and burnt for heresy.

An account of Friar Thomas's preaching and its effect is given by Enguerrand de Monstrelet, provost of Cambrai (died 1453), in his continuation of Froissart's chronicles.
