= Hennin =

Medieval women's headgear

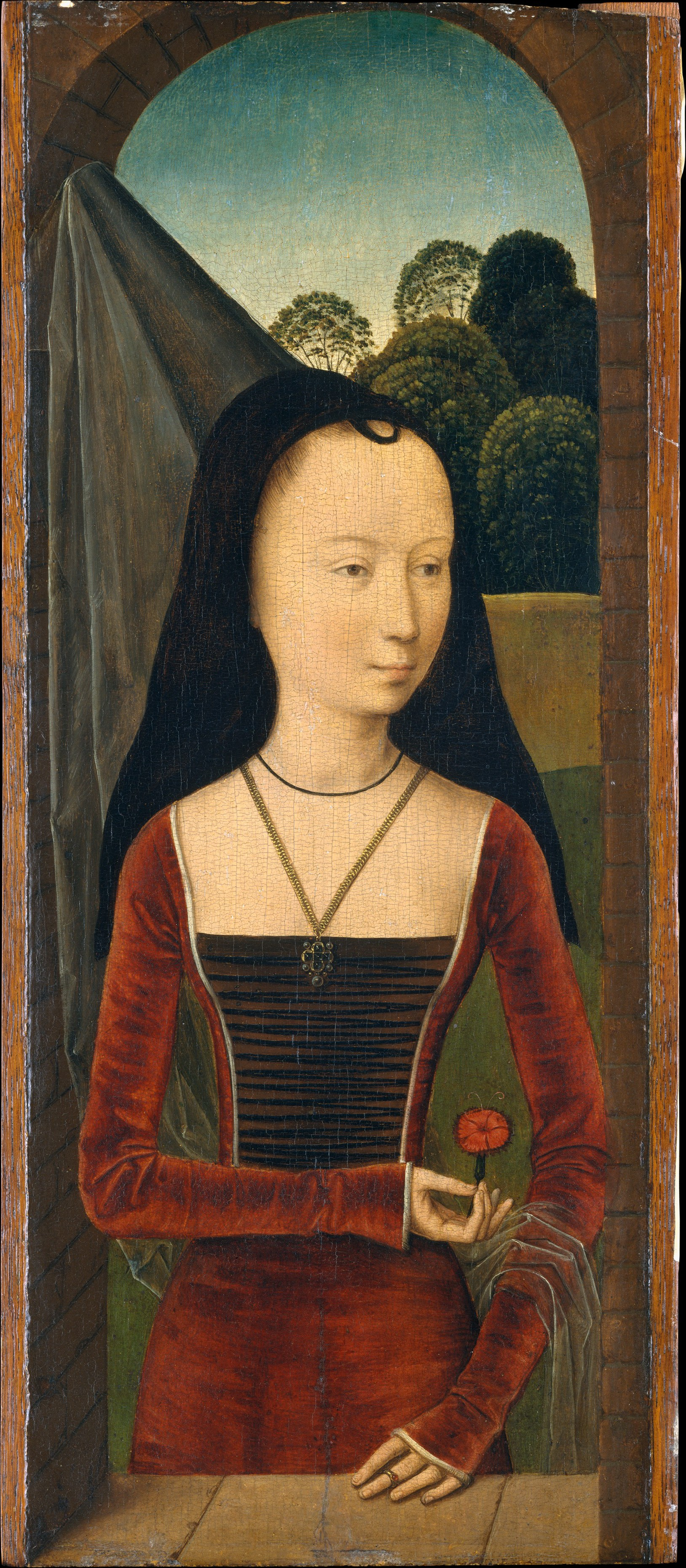
A conical hennin with black velvet lappets (brim) and a sheer veil, 1485–90

The hennin (French: hennin French pronunciation: [enɛ̃]; possibly from Flemish Dutch: henninck meaning cock or rooster) (Note: cf. English surname Hancock) was a headdress in the shape of a cone, steeple, or truncated cone worn in the Late Middle Ages by European women of the nobility. They were most common in Burgundy and France, but also at the English courts, and in Northern Europe. It is unclear what styles the word hennin described at the time, though it is recorded as being used in French areas in 1428, probably before the conical style appeared. The word does not appear in English until the 19th century. The term is therefore used by some writers on costume for other female head-dresses of the period.

In pop culture, the hennin is often used to identify princesses and other important women in a royal court.

== Conical hennins ==
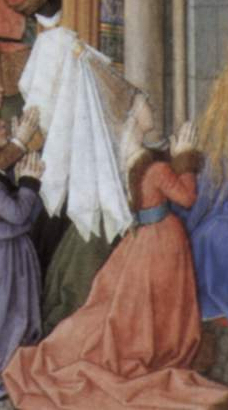
A French hennin, c. 1460, with several white veils, one reaching down to the face. (The white crescent at the tip belongs to the figure behind.)

These appear from about 1430 onwards, especially after the mid-century, initially only among aristocratic women, though later spreading more widely, especially in the truncated form. Typically, the hennin was approximately between 11 and 18 in (28 and 46 cm) high, but might be considerably higher, as much as over 2 ft 5 in (74 cm). The tops of some of these conical hats were pointed while others were truncated, ending in a flat top. It was generally accompanied by a veil (cointoise) that usually emerged from the top of the cone and was allowed to fall onto the woman's shoulders or even to the ground, or was pulled forward over the hennin, often reaching over the woman's face. The cointoise is the model for the scroll work around a coat of arms in heraldry.

The hennin was worn tilted backward at an angle. It was made of light material, often card or a wire mesh over which a light fabric was fixed, although little is known of the details of their construction. There was often a cloth lappet (cornet) (Note: Some use "cornet" as a term for the conical element also.) in front of the hennin, covering part of the brow, and sometimes falling onto the shoulders to either side. There is very often a "frontlet" or short loop seen on the forehead (example) to adjust the hennin forward, and perhaps even to hold it on in wind.

It was fashionable to pluck or shave the forehead to raise the hairlines. The hair was tied tightly on the scalp and usually hidden inside the cone (possibly one end of the veil was tied to the hair and wrapped round, with the free end being pulled through the hole at the tip of the cone). However, some images show long hair worn loose behind the hennin.

Nowadays, the hennin forms part of the depiction of the stereotypical fairy-tale princess. There are some manuscript illuminations that show princesses or queens wearing small crowns either round the brim or at the top of the hennin; it is likely that the very small crown of Margaret of York, Duchess of Burgundy (now in the treasury of Aachen Cathedral) was worn like this for her famously lavish wedding celebrations in 1468.

== Definition ==
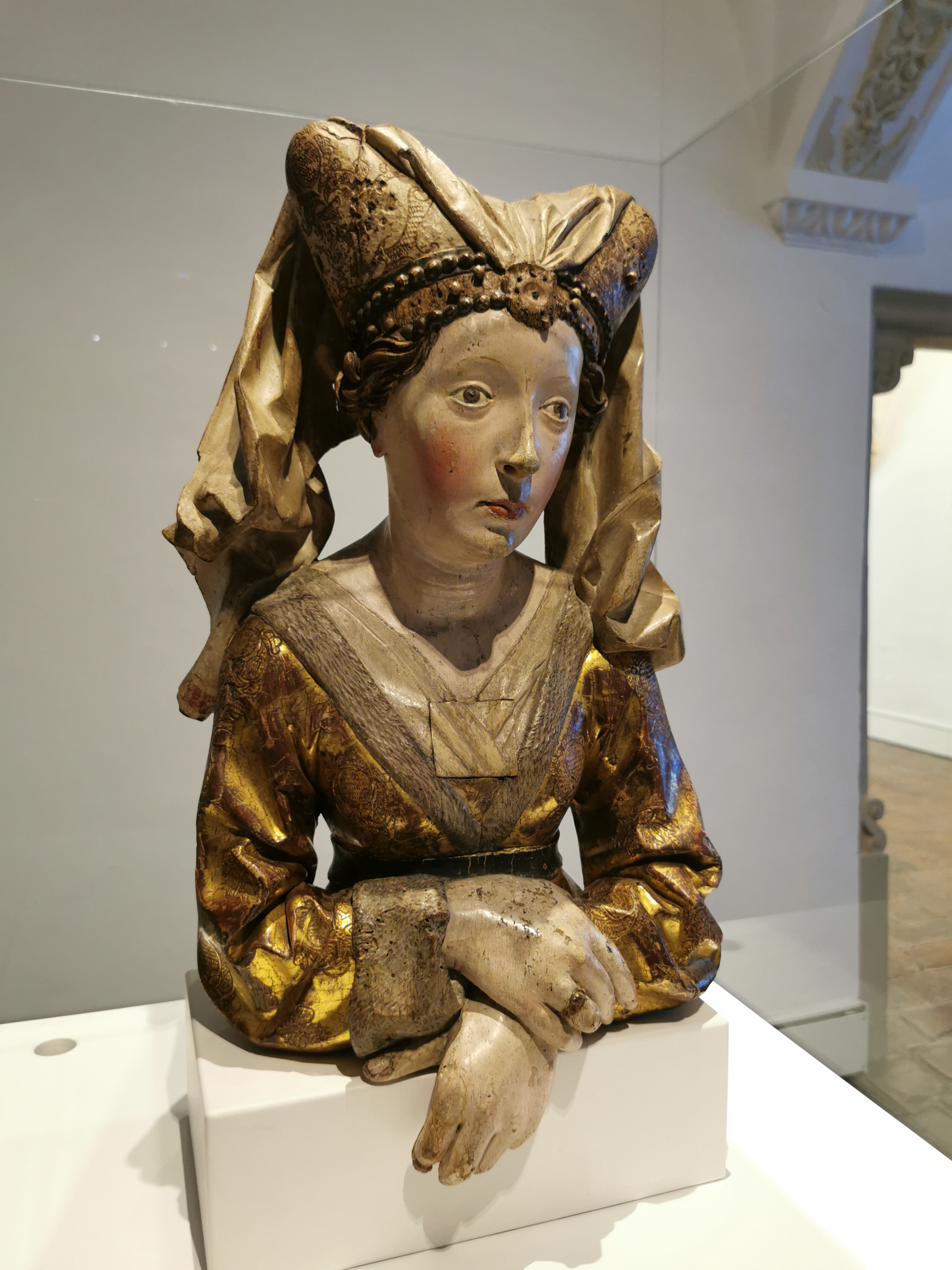
Mary Magdalen in escoffion, Germany, 1470s

Various writers on costume history use hennin to cover a variety of different styles. Almost all agree that the steeple-cone style was a hennin, and the truncated ("flowerpot") versions. Many also include the heart-shaped open-centred escoffion. Some also use the term to cover beehive-shaped fabric head-coverings of the mid-century (example). Others also use it for the head-dresses divided to right and left of the early part of the century, such as those in which Christine de Pisan is usually depicted (example). In some of these only white cloth is visible, but in later examples worn by aristocrats rich fabric can be seen through translucent veils. Some use it for the horned hairstyle with a wimple on top.

The Chronique of Enguerrand de Monstrelet records that in 1428, in what seems to be the first record of the term "hennin", the radical Carmelite friar Thomas Conecte railed against extravagant headdresses of...

...the noble ladies, and all others, who dressed their heads in so ridiculous a manner, and who spent such large sums on such luxuries of fashion.

Thomas urged street boys to chase after such ladies and pluck off their headdresses, crying "Au hennin!", even granting indulgences to those who did so, although as so often in medieval documentary records, no clue as to the form of the "hennins" is given. Based on the evidence from visual records, they were probably not conical head-dresses, which are first seen slightly later. The Catalan poet Gabriel Mòger mocked the "tall deformed hat" (lonch cap deformat) that was popular with Mallorcan women of the time.

== Gallery ==
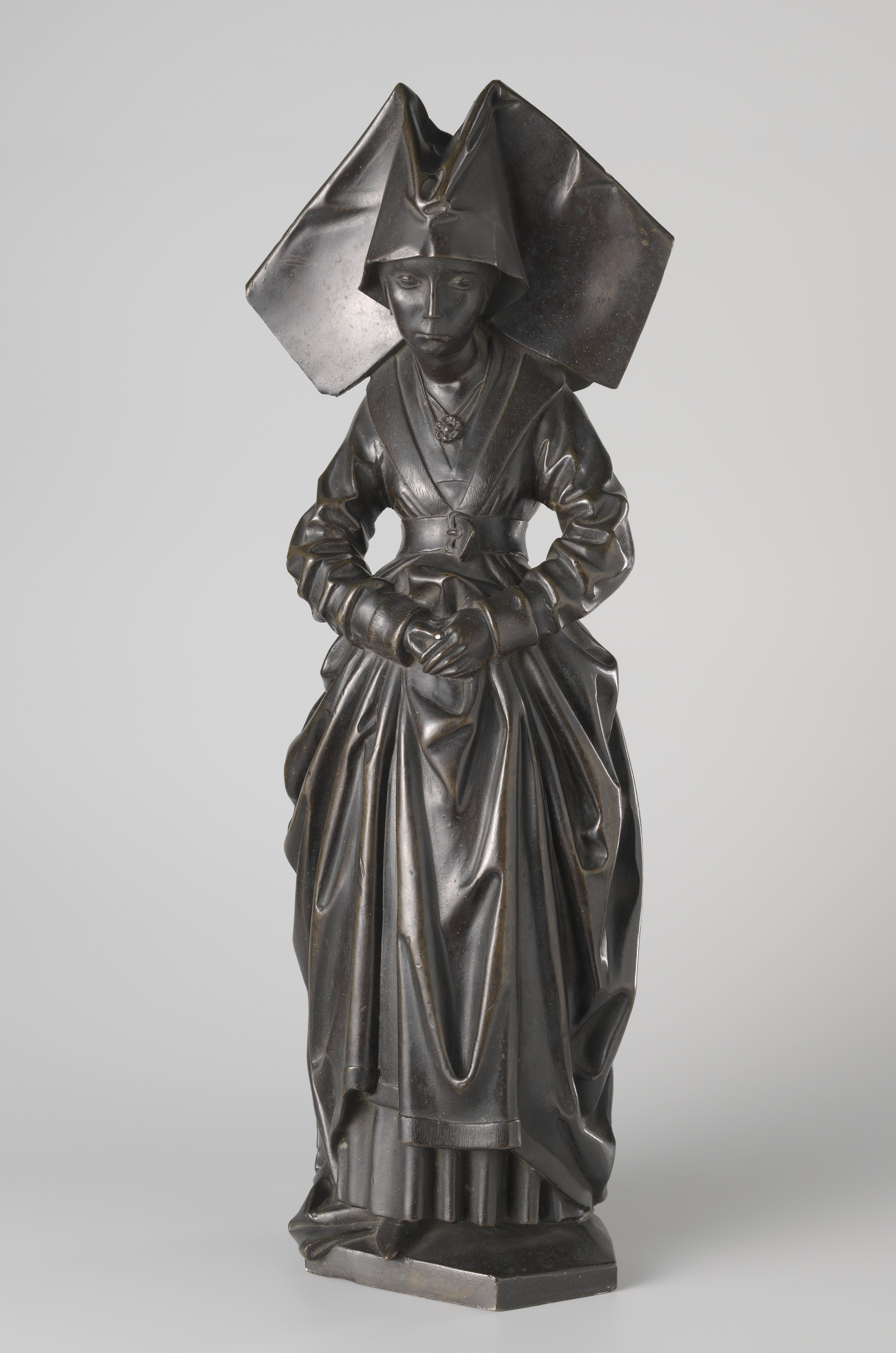
Mourner from the mid 15th-century Tomb of Isabella of Bourbon wearing a truncated linen hennin.

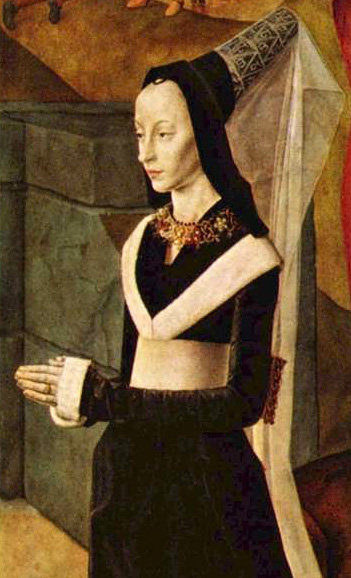
Maria Portinari of Bruges wearing a high but still truncated hennin, with a veil hanging from the top and black lappets or underhood, 1476–78.

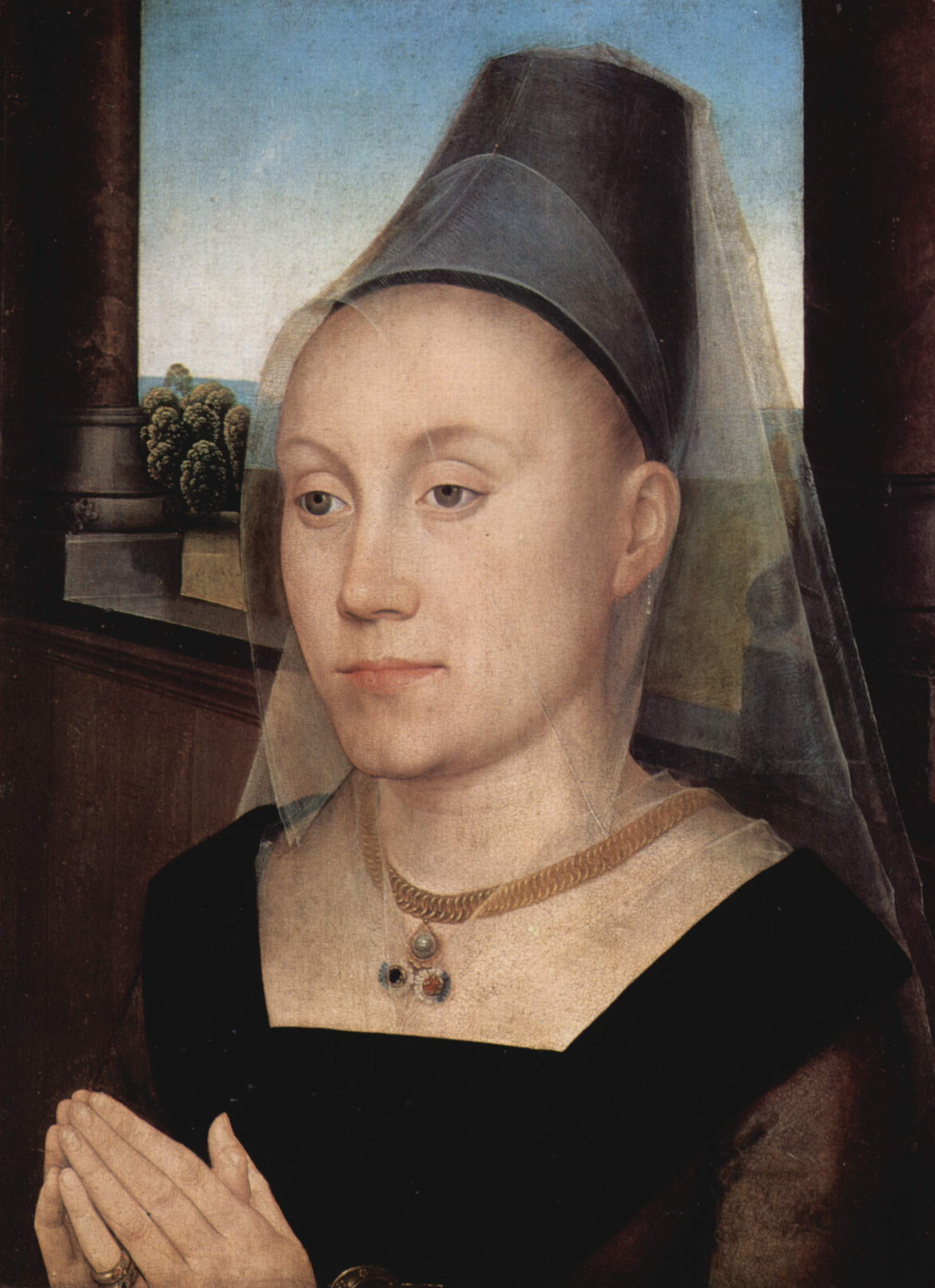
Barbara van Vlaendenbergh wearing a truncated hennin, Burgundy, ca. 1480

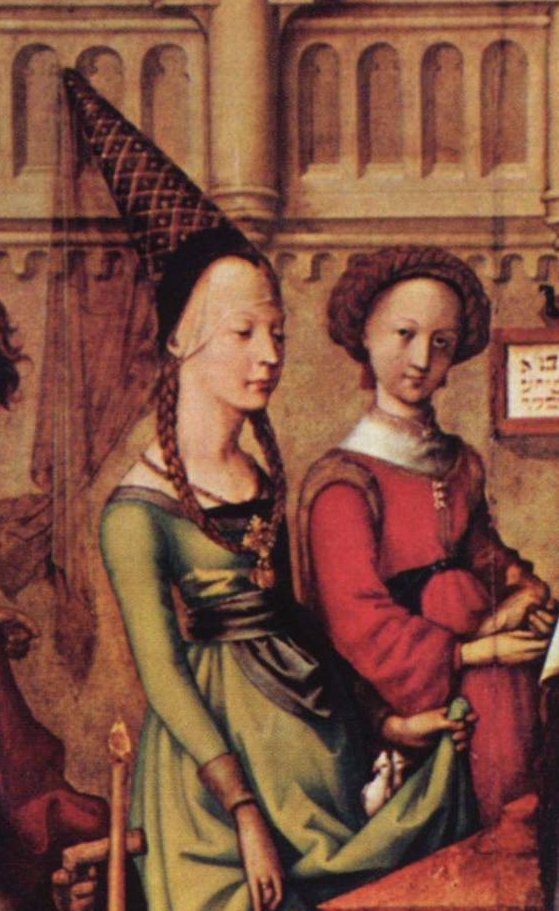
Hennin worn with braids, 1500–01. By then, hennins had reached Basel in Switzerland, but were rather out of date in Paris or Burgundy.

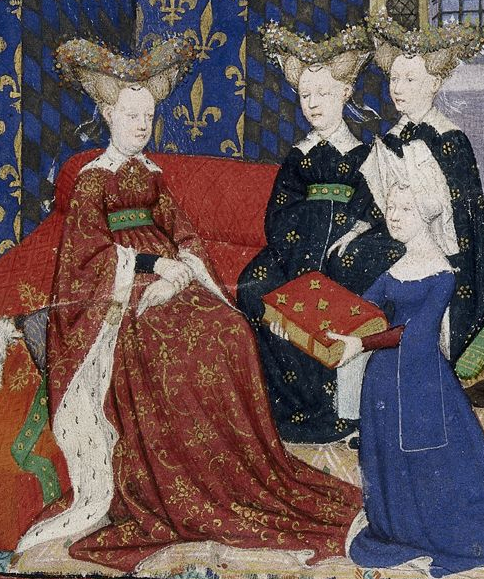
Christine de Pisan presents a book to Queen Isabeau, who wears a jewelled bourrelet. Christine wears a divided hennin covered in white cloth.

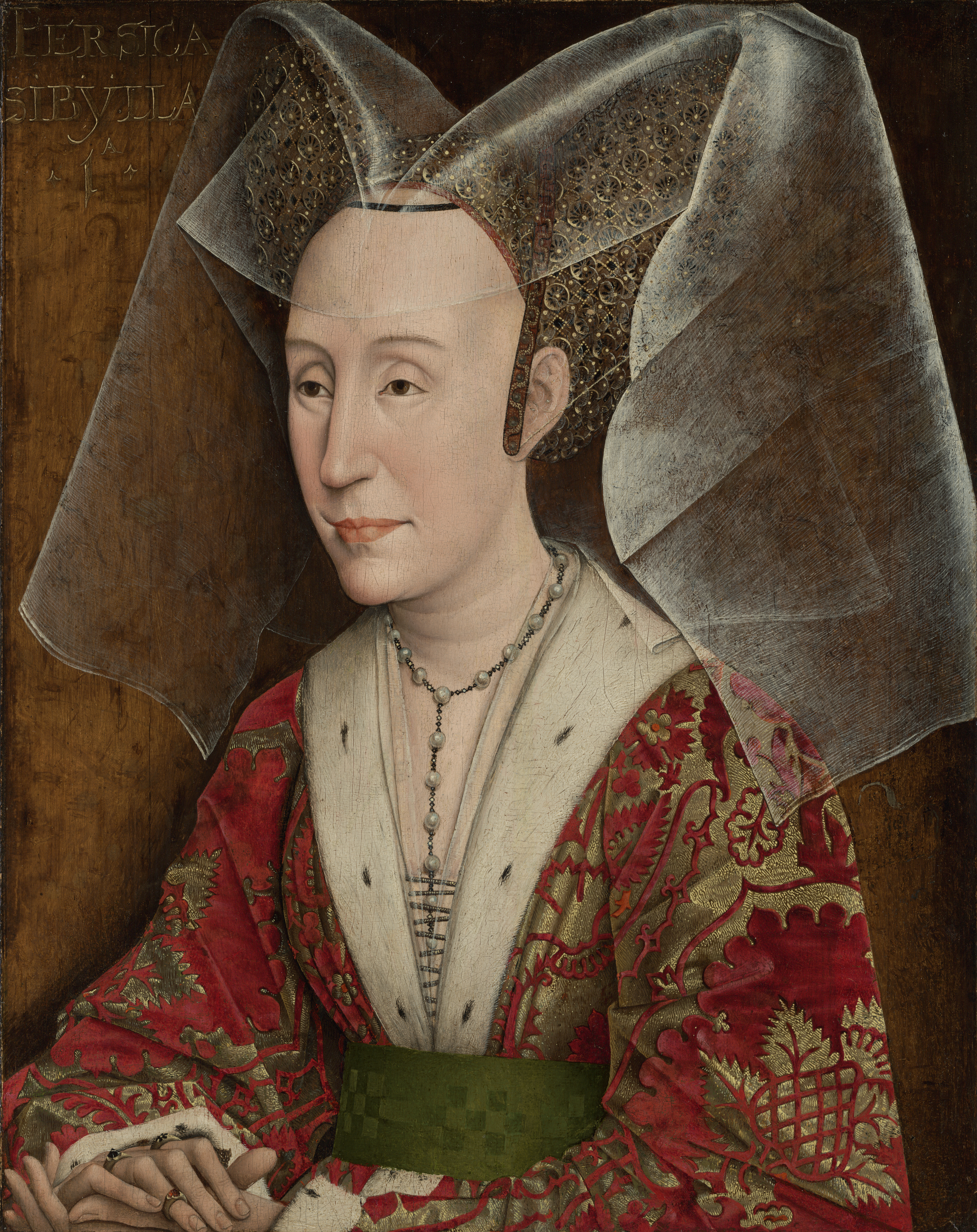
Isabella of Portugal, Duchess of Burgundy in a divided hennin. Copy of original of 1445–50.

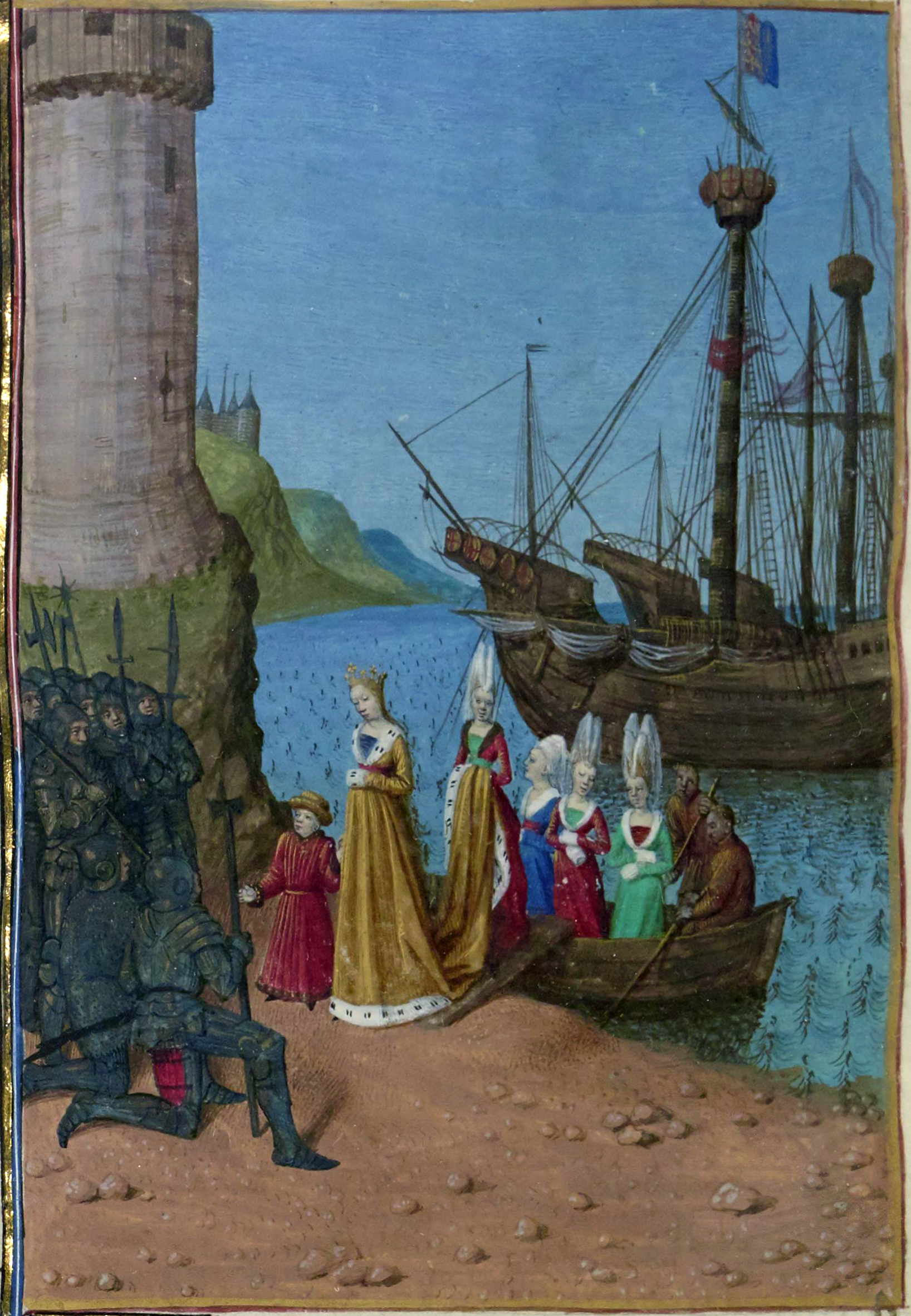
France c. 1455–1460. The illuminated manuscript portraying Isabella of France (1295-1358), and her ladies-in-waiting wearing anachronistic clothing. The ladies-in-waiting wear very high divided hennins.

Hair is pulled back in an embroidered "beehive" hennin and covered by a short veil. The veil reaches the eyebrows. Burgundy, ca. 1455.

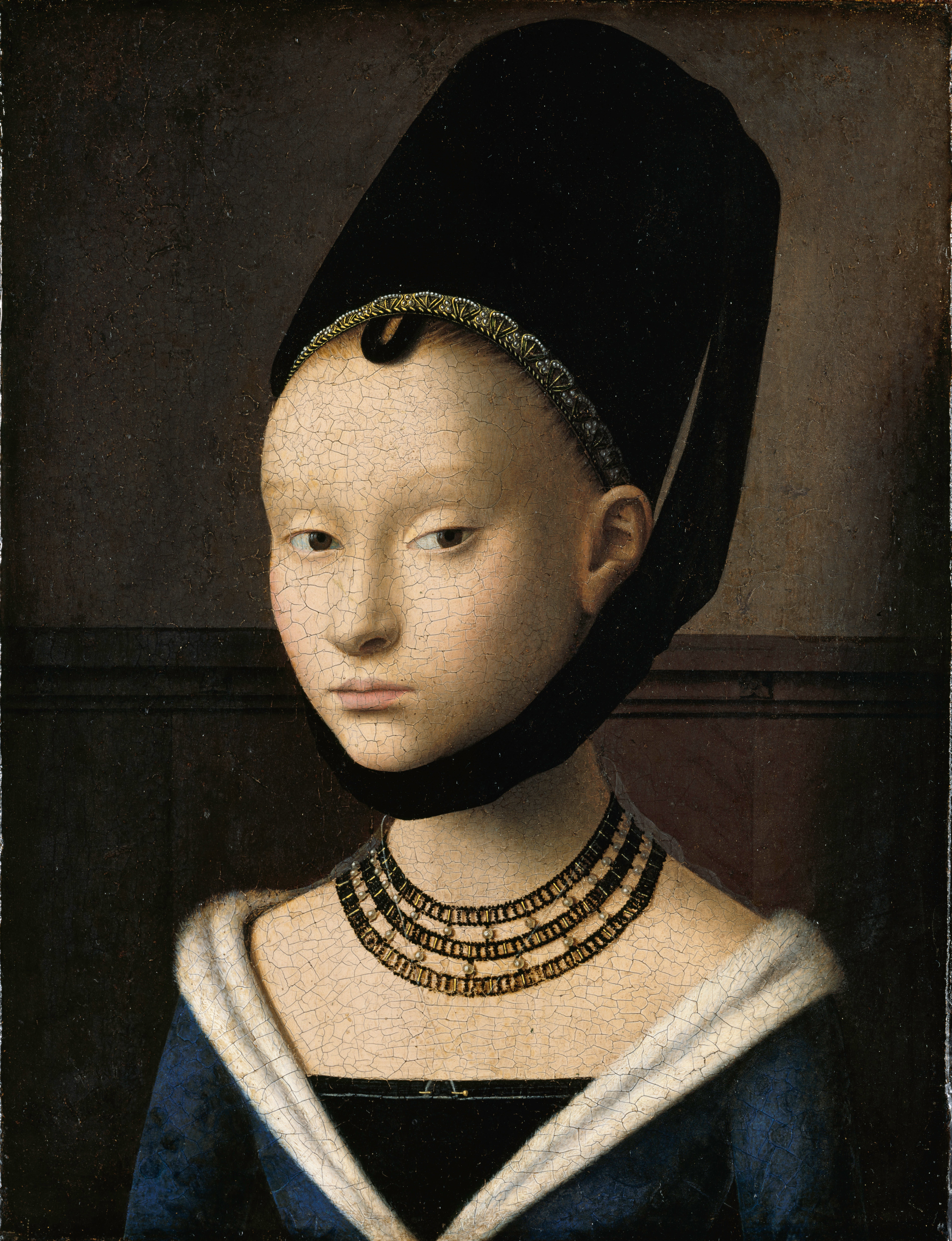
Portrait of a Young Girl, Petrus Christus. A truncated hennin, fashionable in the Low Countries the 1460s.

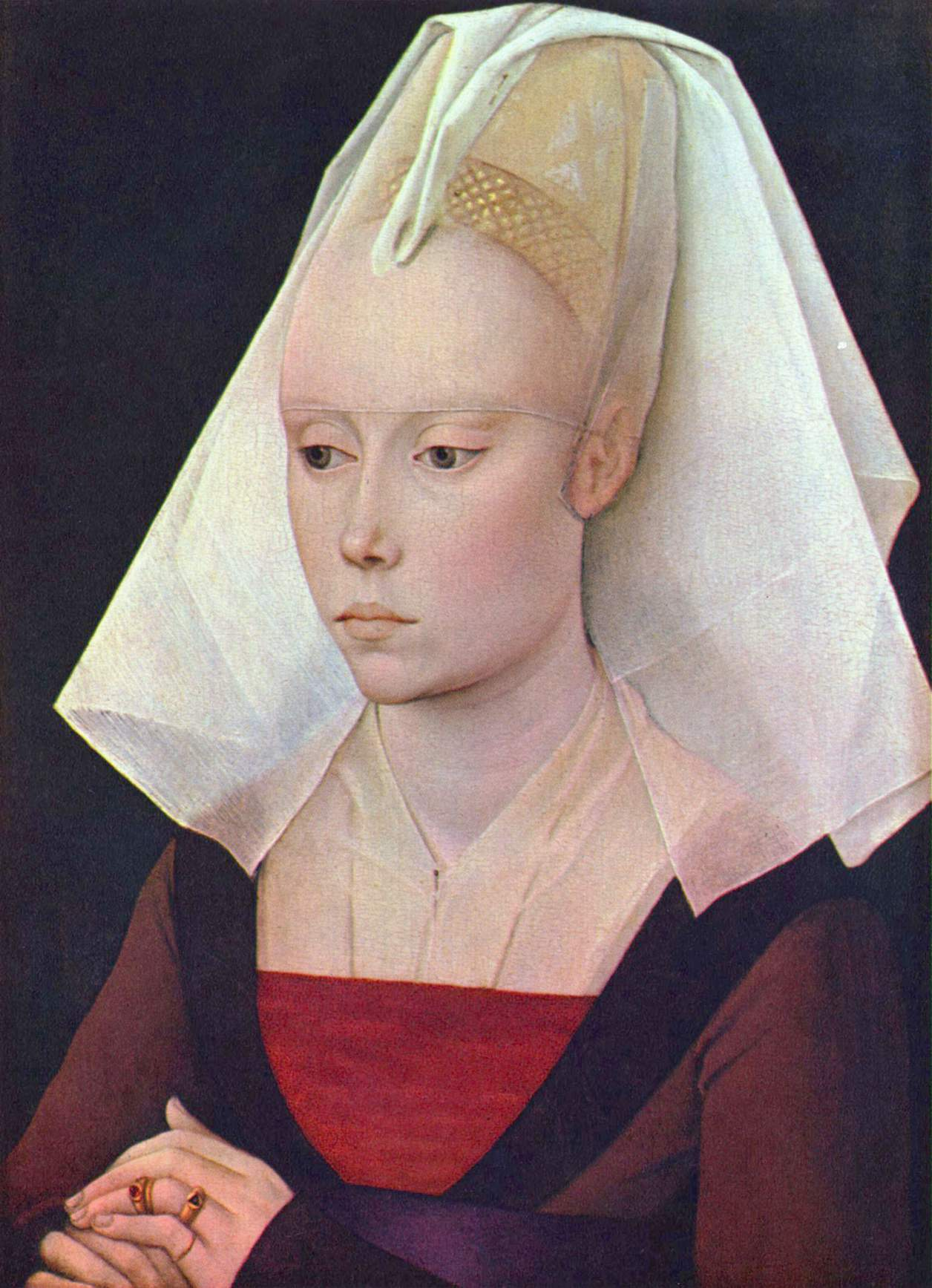
A woman of the Burgundian gentry in a "beehive" or perhaps truncated cone hennin, 1460s. Part of the veil comes forward to cover the eyebrows.

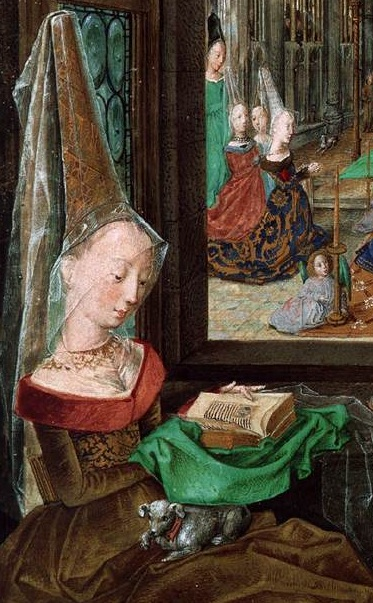
Mary of Burgundy at prayer wearing a tall hennin, 1470s.

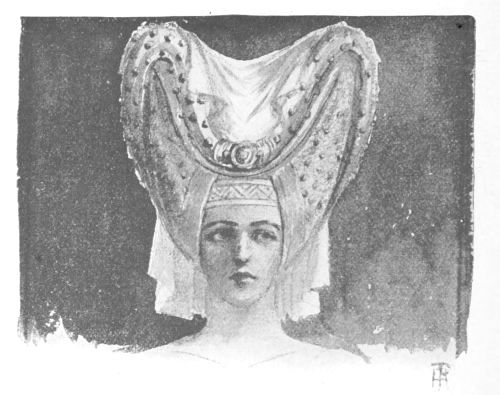
15th-century escoffion with jewelled velvet and lawn (1908 illustration)

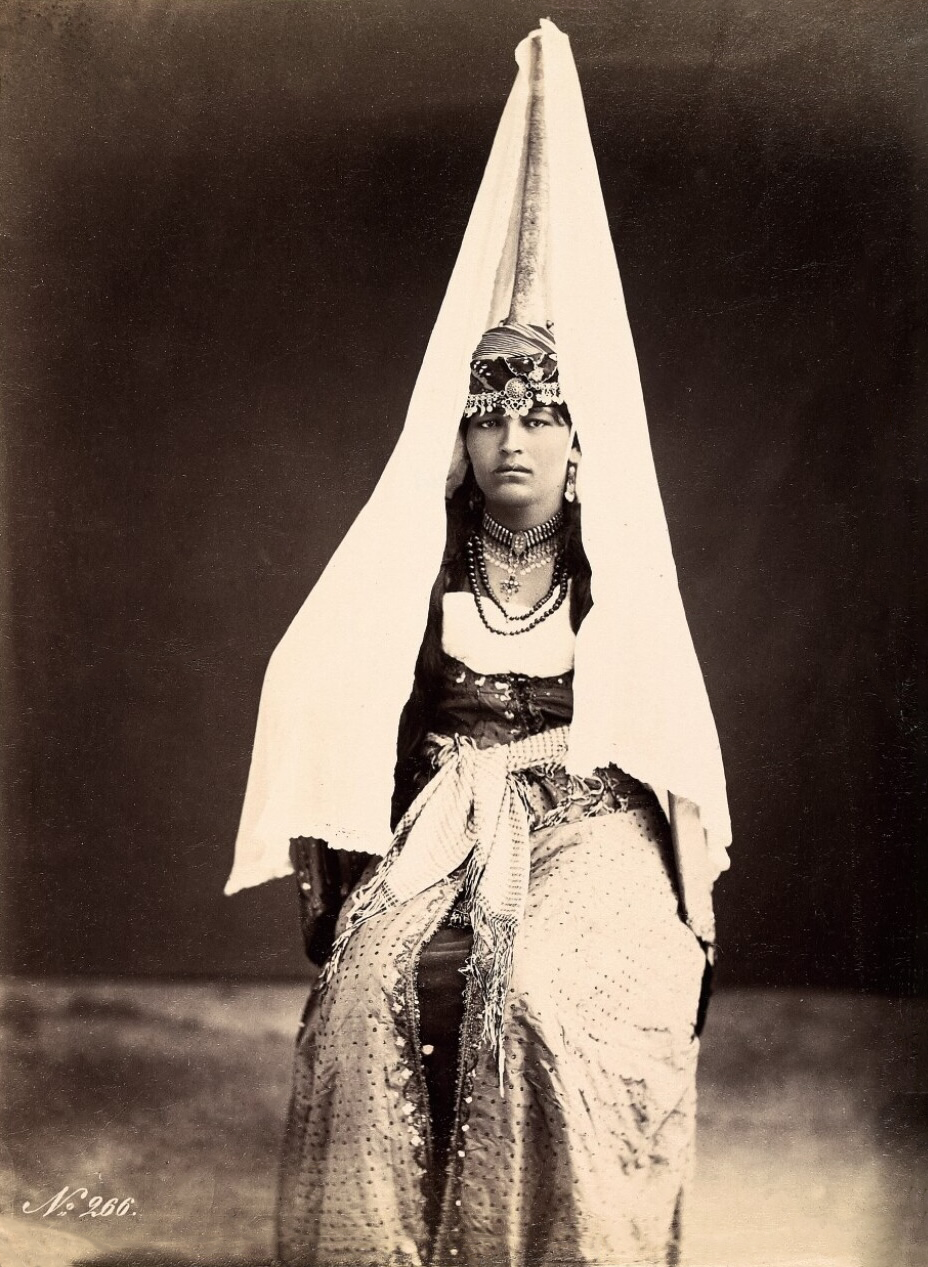
A hennin-like tantour on a Druze woman in Chouf, Lebanon, 1870s

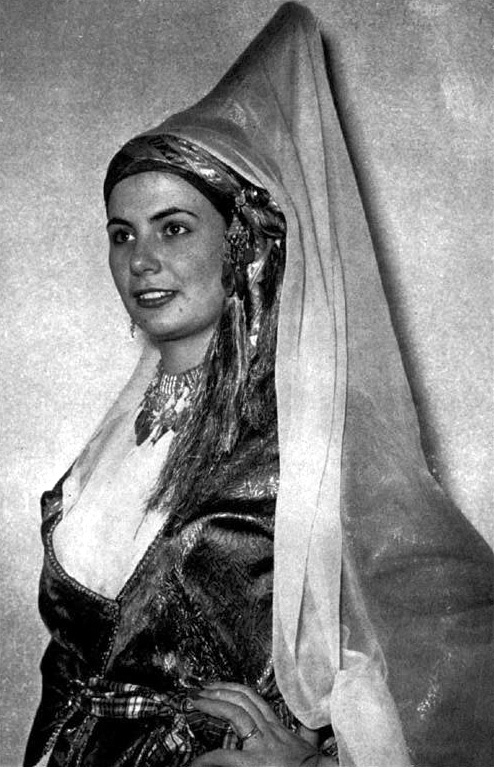
A recreated 19th-century hennin-like Lebanese tantour

== See also ==
- 1400–1500 in European fashion
- Tantur
- Capuchon
- Pointed hat
- Coif
