= Cointoise =

Pendant scarf made from a hat or helmet

A cointoise is a pendant scarf made for a hat or helmet. Originally, the cloth was worn by Crusaders to keep their helmets cool in the heat of Palestine. Later, it was used a decoration in jousting; the same term being applied later to the veil worn by women which floated from the top of their hennins. It is the original of the heraldic "mantle" or wavy scrolls around a coat of arms.
