= Portrait of Barbara van Vlaendenbergh =

Painting by Hans Memling

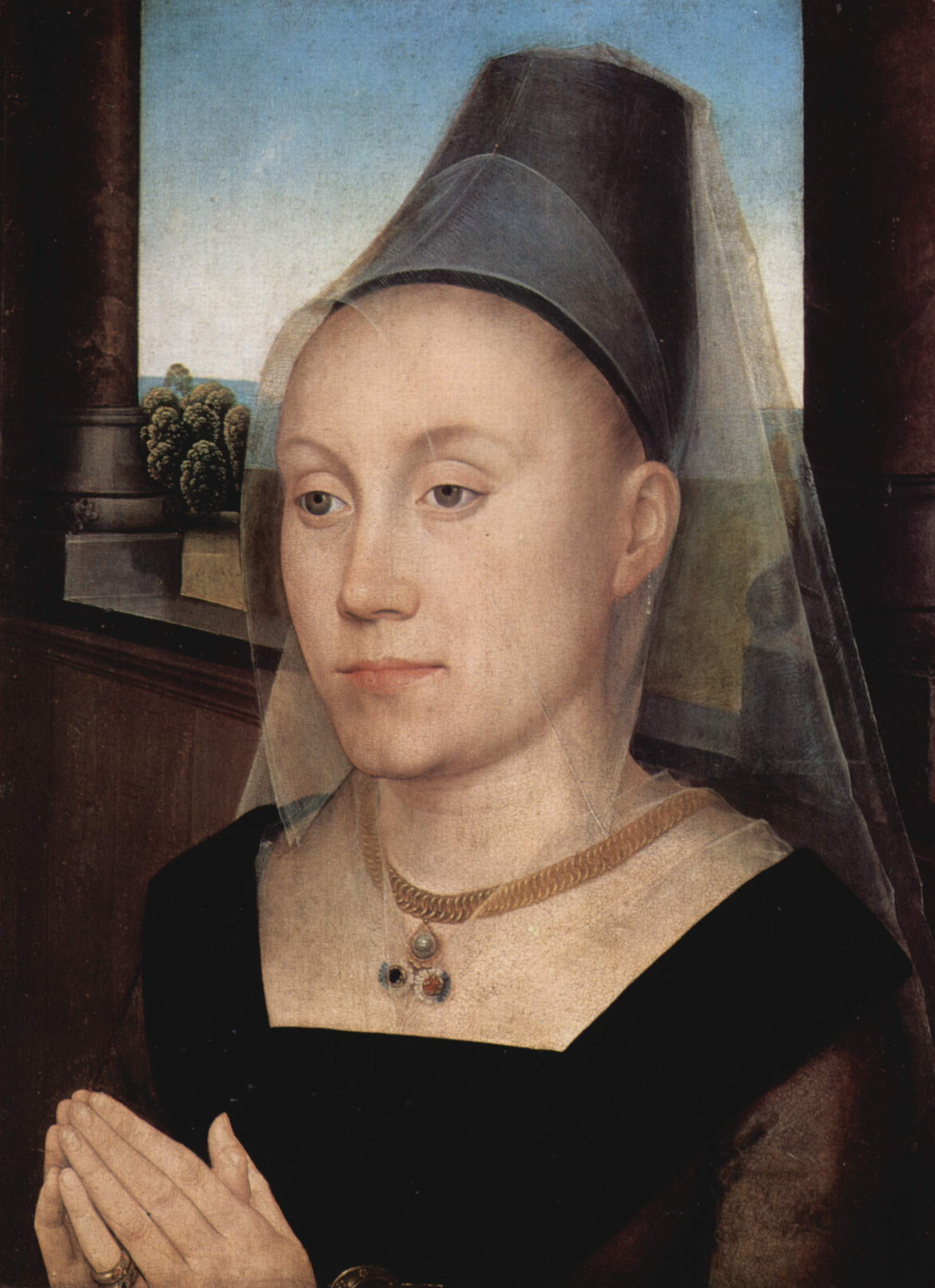
Portrait of Barbara van Vlaendenbergh, c. 1480, 37 × 27 cm (14.6 × 10.6 in). Royal Museums of Fine Arts of Belgium

Portrait of Barbara van Vlaendenbergh is a small c.1470–72 oil on wood painting by Hans Memling in the Royal Museums of Fine Arts of Belgium. She is shown in three quarters profile with her hands clasped in prayer, and wears a small black hennin with a transparent veil. Her hair is tightly pulled back, and shaved above the forehead. Van Vlaendenbergh is positioned before a landscape framed by an open window.

== Sources ==
- Panofsky, Erwin. Early Netherlandish Painting. London: HarperCollins, 1953. ISBN 978-0-06-430002-5
- De Vos, Dirk. Hans Memling: The Complete Works. Ghent: Harry N Abrams, 1994. ISBN 978-0-8109-3649-2
