= Escoffion =

Woman's headdress of 15th century Europe

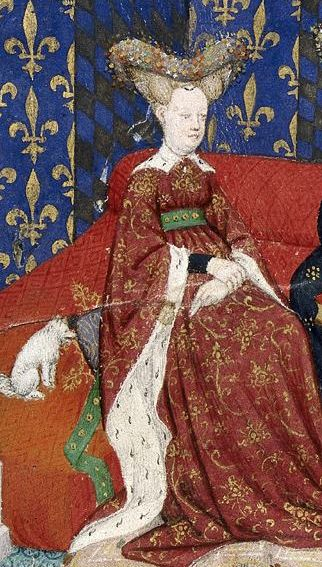
- Detail of: Queen Isabeau receiving Christine de Pisan's Le Livre de la Cité des Dames
- Year: c. 1410–1414
- Medium: Illumination on parchment
- Location: British Library

An escoffion ([ɛsˈkɔfiˌjã]) is a piece of female medieval headwear which was popular during the Late Middle Ages (1250–1500). It originated and was popular in European countries such as England, France and Germany, and several Balkan states. The headpiece was made out of a thick, circular roll of material like wool, felt or silk. The material was shaped, by sewing or starching, into a double-horned configuration, with each horn sometimes being up to a yard long. Over the headdress, gauze or silk was sometimes draped for weight distribution or aesthetic purposes. The escoffion style was a sub-branch of a popular style of headwear called hennin.

The style of the escoffion developed over time, eventually given its own name because of its popularity and distinct features which differed from the original conical hennin. The escoffion was a type of "reticulated headdress", meaning that it was bound together by a network of golden thread or wire. The headdress itself was made out of various types of materials, predominantly wool, using looms. The more intricate details were sewn on by skilled craftswomen or men. The hair of the wearer was tucked away under the headdress in a number of ways; the hair could either be braided and tucked underneath the escoffion or pinned into place on each side of the head in configurations sometimes known as "side-pillars".

Alternatively, the headdress was worn over a wimple or caul, simple pieces of cloth which kept the wearer's hair out of sight and provided a base for the larger headdress to attach on to. The covering of hair, sometimes called a bongrace, was a common custom amongst women of the Middle Ages, and continued to be a prominent feature in headwear for many centuries. The escoffion was usually worn by women of high status, such as those who lived in the court, or those who were a part of the Royal Family.

Who exactly could wear headwear such as the escoffion, or other luxury clothing items, was dictated by sumptuary laws which controlled the over-expenditure on luxury items and also maintained a type of social hierarchy based on birth, influence or economic income. While the escoffion was deemed a luxury item for a time, it was later deemed as ungraceful or cumbersome, as well as being condemned by moralist or religious groups for supposedly depicting satanic imagery. Additionally, the headwear came out of fashion into the 16th century simply because of its size; some wearers were often unable to do certain activities because their mobility was hindered by the weight upon their head. Thus, many women adopted a more simple style of headwear leading into the 16th century, which was seen as both practical and conservatively religious.

The escoffion was sometimes called the bourrelet, a word that originally simply means something stuffed or padded (rembourré < bourre).

== The Escoffion and the Hennin ==
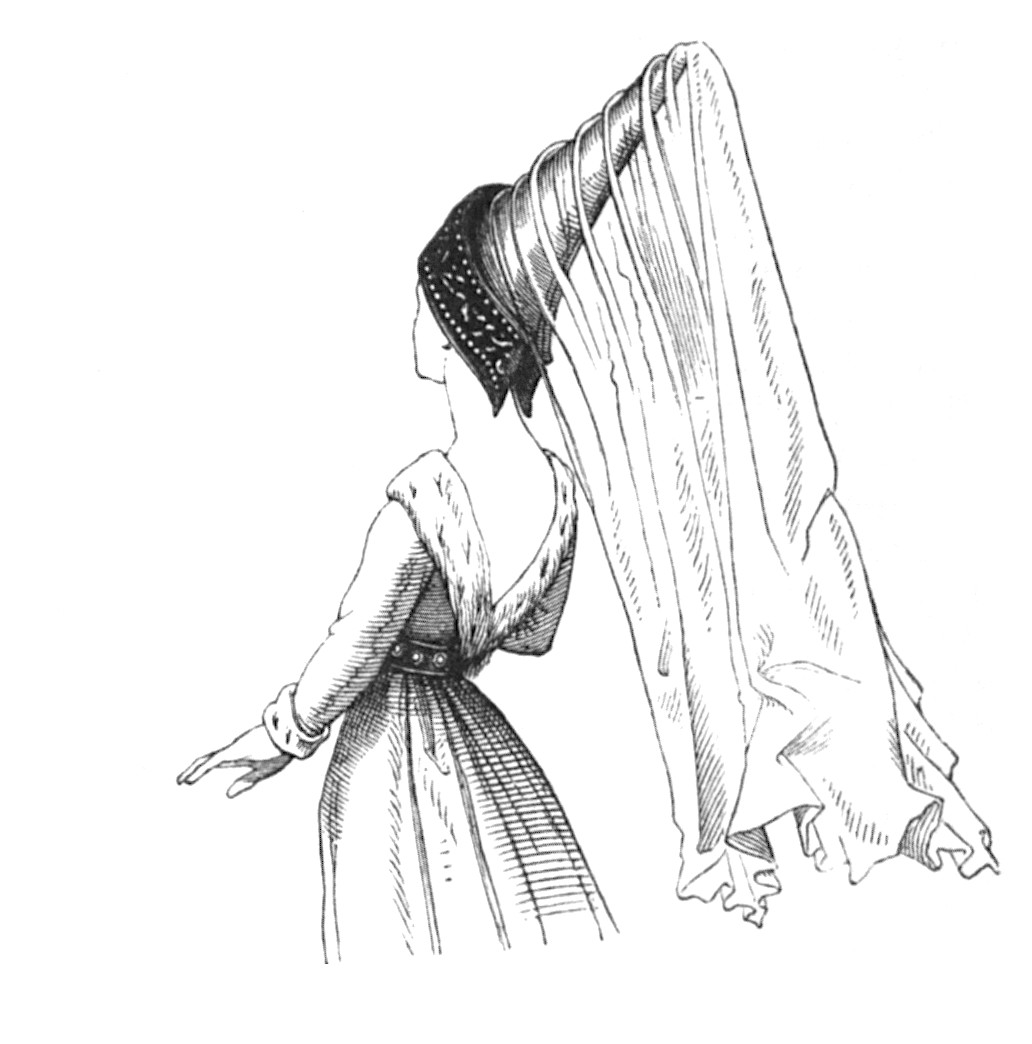
A conical hennin

There is often some mislabelling in terms of what style or type of headwear the Escoffion falls under. Often, it is categorised as a separate kind of medieval headwear called hennin, often being referred to as a "two-horned-" or "heart-shaped hennin", etc. However, it is important to make a distinction between the hennin and the escoffion, as the escoffion was a distinct piece of headwear in terms of its design. The hennin was typically a tall, conical headdress, to which long strips of gauze or silk were sometimes attached. The headpiece itself could be so tall that it made the wearer stand up to 12 feet in height. While the hennin was known for its height, the Escoffion was much wider in nature and sat over the wearer's head. Both headpieces were in fashion at about the same time amongst women of the court and as such, this is one of the reasons they are often categorised together. In fact, the Escoffion was originally labelled a hennin, but developed its own name due to its increase in popularity. This is covered in the Origins and Design section.

== Origins and design ==
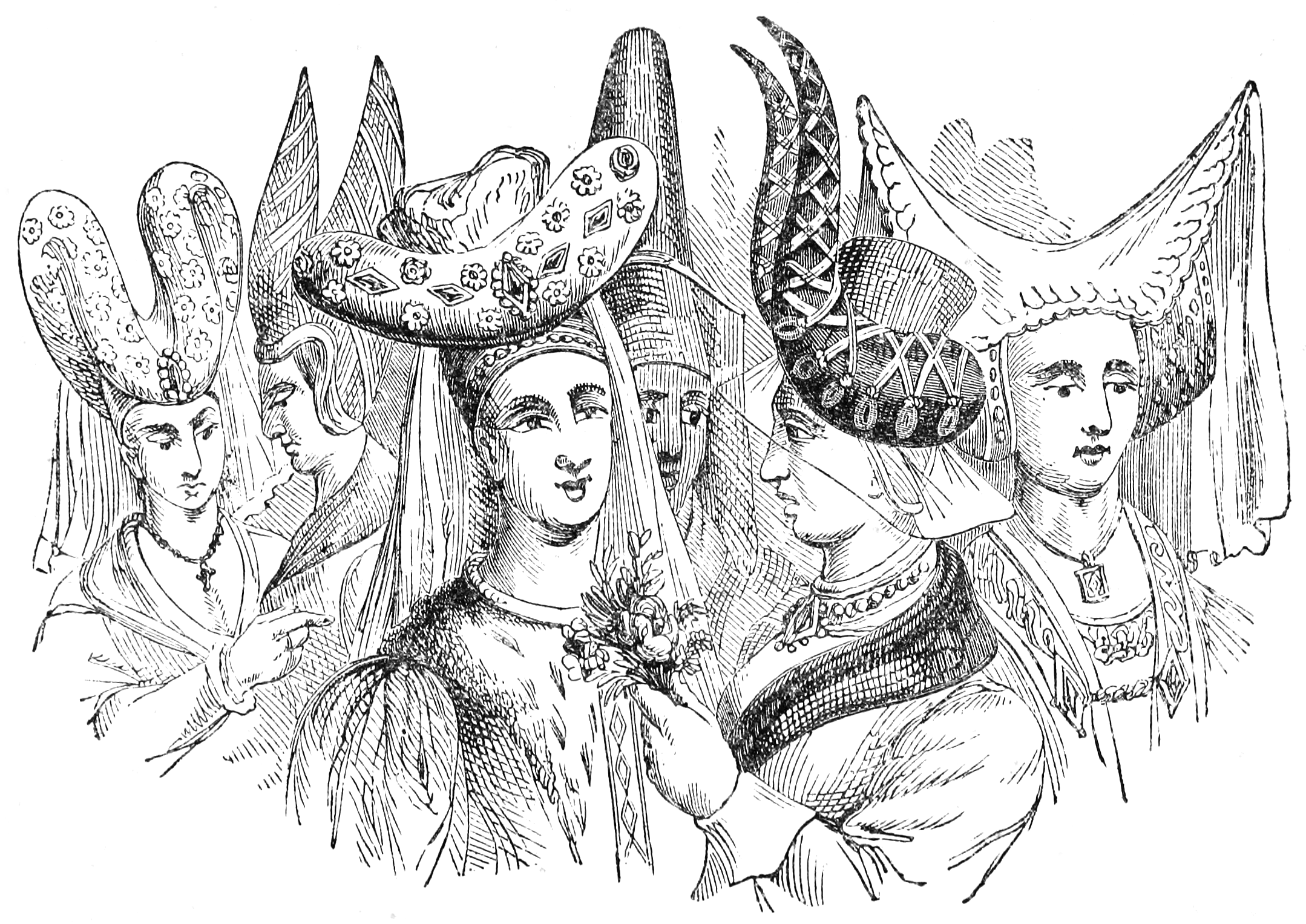
15th-century hennins

It is difficult to pinpoint the exact country or region where the escoffion first originated, because the style as it is now known developed in a number of stages over almost a century. In the 15th century, there was an upsurge of interest in large, sometimes extravagant headwear, which emerged into popular court fashion across Europe. Prior to the 14th century, simple veils or hoods which were fitted close to the face had been the most popular form of headwear for women of all classes. The hair was completely covered by the hoods, sometimes even shaved or plucked to heighten the hairline; this was a common symbol of female attractiveness at the time. The material of the hood grew in length leading up to the end of the 14th century, eventually resulting in one or more lengths of material hanging down the back of the wearer, sometimes being so long that they had to be tucked into a belt or dress so that the wearer would not trip over it. Progressing into the late 14th century, hair was still being covered, but larger headdresses - rolls of material of various shapes, such as a heart, turban or double-horned shapes - were placed on top of these coverings. It was only later that the double-horned configuration got its own name; the escoffion.

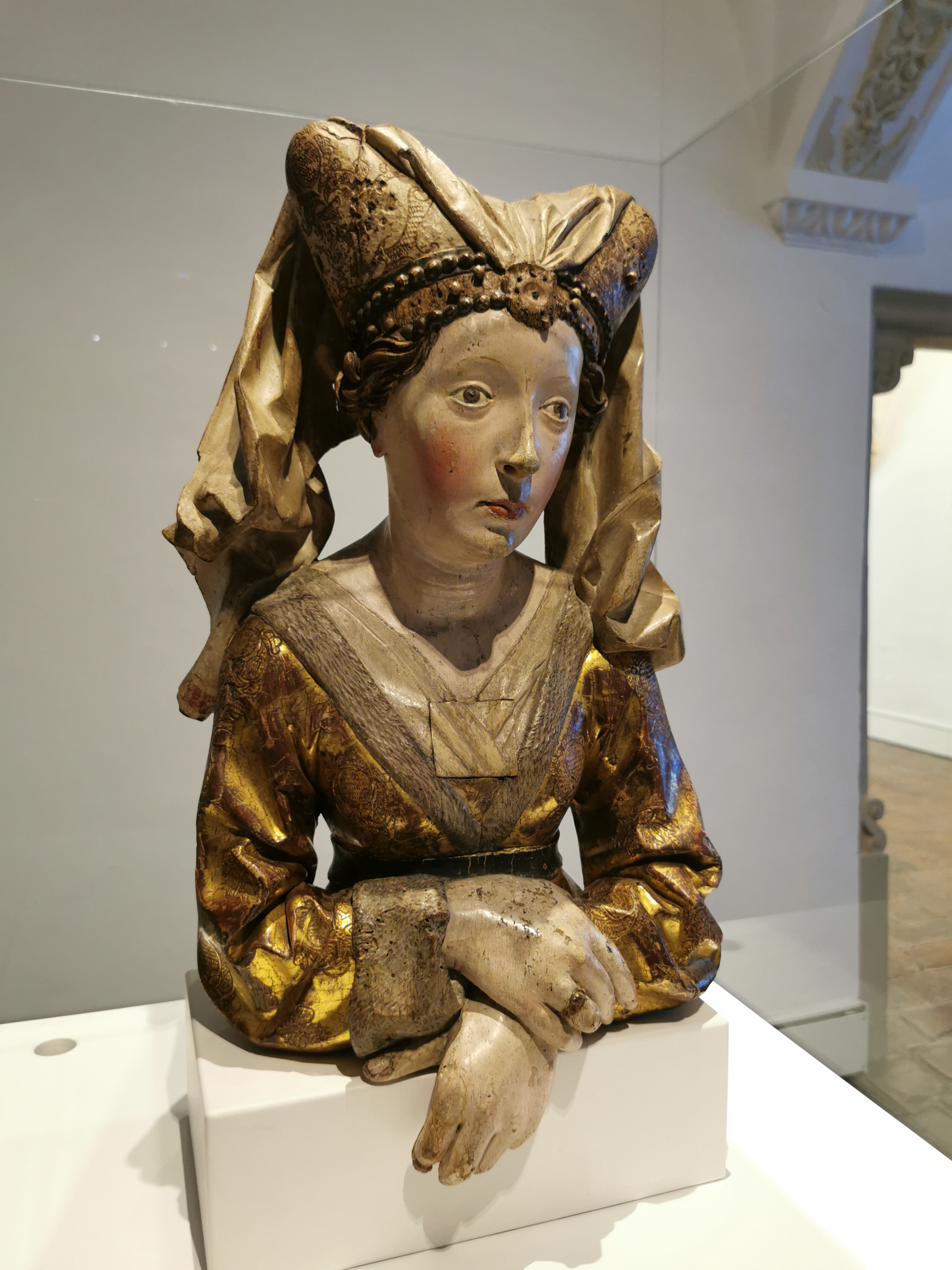
Mary Magdalen in escoffion, Germany, 1470s

Shown above is a detail of an illumination on parchment showing Queen Isabeau of Bavaria wearing a heart-shaped escoffion. The headpiece was worn mostly by women of the court, or those of a higher class. The conventions surrounding who was able to wear the escoffion is covered in the Medieval clothing laws and headwear section below. Court fashion had become increasingly more extravagant across Europe in the Late Middle Ages, particularly in England, France, Germany and other countries in Western Europe. The escoffion varied in terms of style across Europe, with the English 'Tudor' escoffion coming into prominence. Essentially, the Tudor style of headwear was a more subdued and conservative version of the original large headdress.

== Production ==
Textile production changed drastically from the Early to Late Middle Ages. Textiles were made using a number of materials - predominantly wool which was fabricated using various types of looms. Archaeological studies have found that before the 11th century, textiles were predominantly made using vertical looms, while after this point, great innovation in the textile industry gave way to the use of horizontal looms. This evolution in technology meant that more complex patterns could be achieved. Textiles were made by skilled female workers in textile factories. Later, hydraulic mills came to the forefront of textile production. Materials were dyed using dye extracted from organic substances such as insects. As the making of the headwear was very intricate, the escoffion was hand-crafted by skilled craftsmen or women and could take a matter of months to be completed, depending on the complexity of the piece. More recently, various types of medieval headwear, including the escoffion, have been re-made as a form of arts and crafts or for costume purposes for medieval conventions or theatrical work. Various examples of the modern fabrications of the escoffion appear on sites like Pinterest.

== Medieval clothing laws and headwear ==
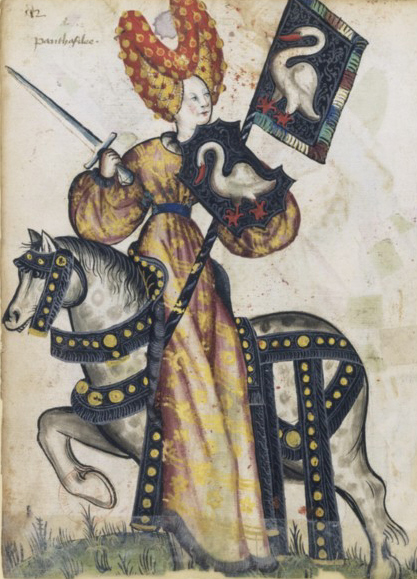
Penthesilea as one of the Nine Female Worthies

In the Middle Ages, the types of clothing which people could wear were dictated by clothing laws. These laws dictated which classes of people could obtain and wear certain types of clothing. The laws were based on a hierarchy of wealth or status. These laws are sometimes labelled as sumptuary laws. The first English sumptuary law was passed in 1337, banning clothing made out of any foreign (non-English) materials to be worn. These kinds of laws were put into place to stop the over-expenditure of the upper classes on luxury items. Alternatively, these laws could be viewed as protectionist in nature, enacted in order to protect the textile industries of the time from overproduction and encourage local industry to develop. However, economics played a relatively small role in the overall larger effect social order and hierarchy had on clothing laws. In a sub-section of the Statutes of Savoy (1430) there were thirty-nine supposed different groups of people in Savoy society - mostly separated by birth or occupation - sorted into a hierarchy, with each level given specifications about what type of clothing they could wear, the value of the material and which accessories they could adorn. The more elaborate clothing designs, which required more material and a higher level of craftsmanship, were reserved for these higher classes, such as the nobility, men and women of the court or the Royal Family (who had access to almost everything). People of lower-class or socio-economic status wore simpler clothes, often without a headdress at all. One symbol of sumptuary law which could be commonly seen in the 15th century was the dress custom amongst women of making their hairline higher, called a bongrace. This custom was originally achieved by tying a ribbon of varying materials around the head and later evolved into shaving of the hairline. Certain materials has specific meanings; for example, wearing velvet meant that the wearer had an annual income of £10 or more. At that time, clothing dyes were made from organic materials such as plants and insects. Dyes were expensive to make, often yielding little produce and as a result the richest and darkest of dyes were reserved only for people of higher status. The wearing of the escoffion and other extravagant types of headwear was regulated by these sumptuary laws in England, although similar edicts were passed in other parts of Europe.

== Decline ==
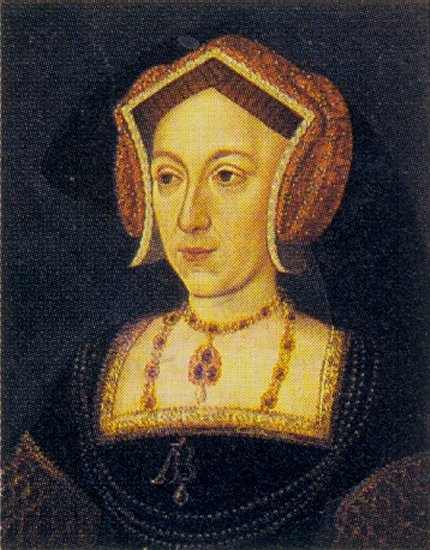
Lady wearing a gable hood

The extravagances of headwear in the late fifteenth century was so notorious that it prompted the retaliation of a number of religious and moralist groups of the time, who likened the shape of some pieces of headwear to a goat or ram, animals which were strongly associated with Baphomet, a deity believed at the time to be representative of the Devil. This did not dissuade many women of the court or higher class to change their style until the early 16th century, when many adopted styles that were more simplistic and conservative. The new style of headwear which would gain popularity, especially in England, into the 16th century was the 'gable' hood, a piece of headwear which covered most of the face and hair and had a starched, steeple-shaped point in the middle of the head.

== See also ==
- 1400–1500 in European fashion
- Hennin
- Headgear
