= Tantour =

Levantine cone-shaped woman's headdress

The tantour (tantoor) is a form of cone-shaped women's headdress similar to the hennin, popular in the Levant during the nineteenth century, but seldom seen after 1850 outside of use as a folk costume. The tantour was usually only worn by wealthy noblewomen and often decorated with precious jewels and pearls, with most expensive tantours being made of gold or silver. Being an honored headdress, the tantour was a customary gift presented to the bride by her husband on their wedding day.

== Gallery ==
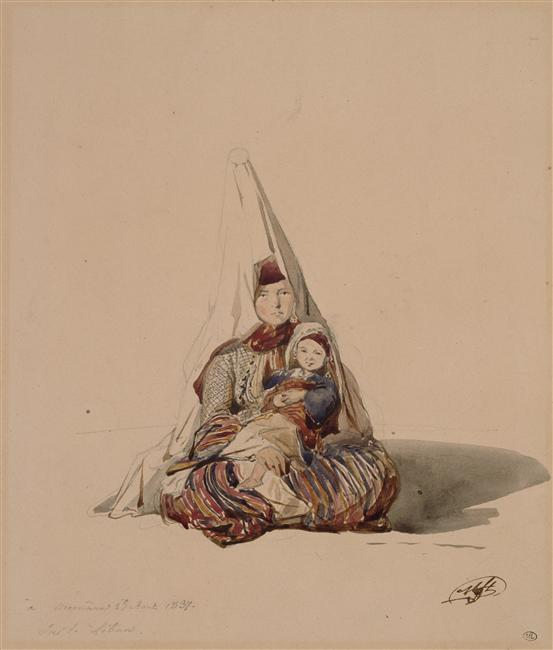
Lebanese princess of the Abillama family with a child, by Antoine-Alphonse Montfort, c. 1837

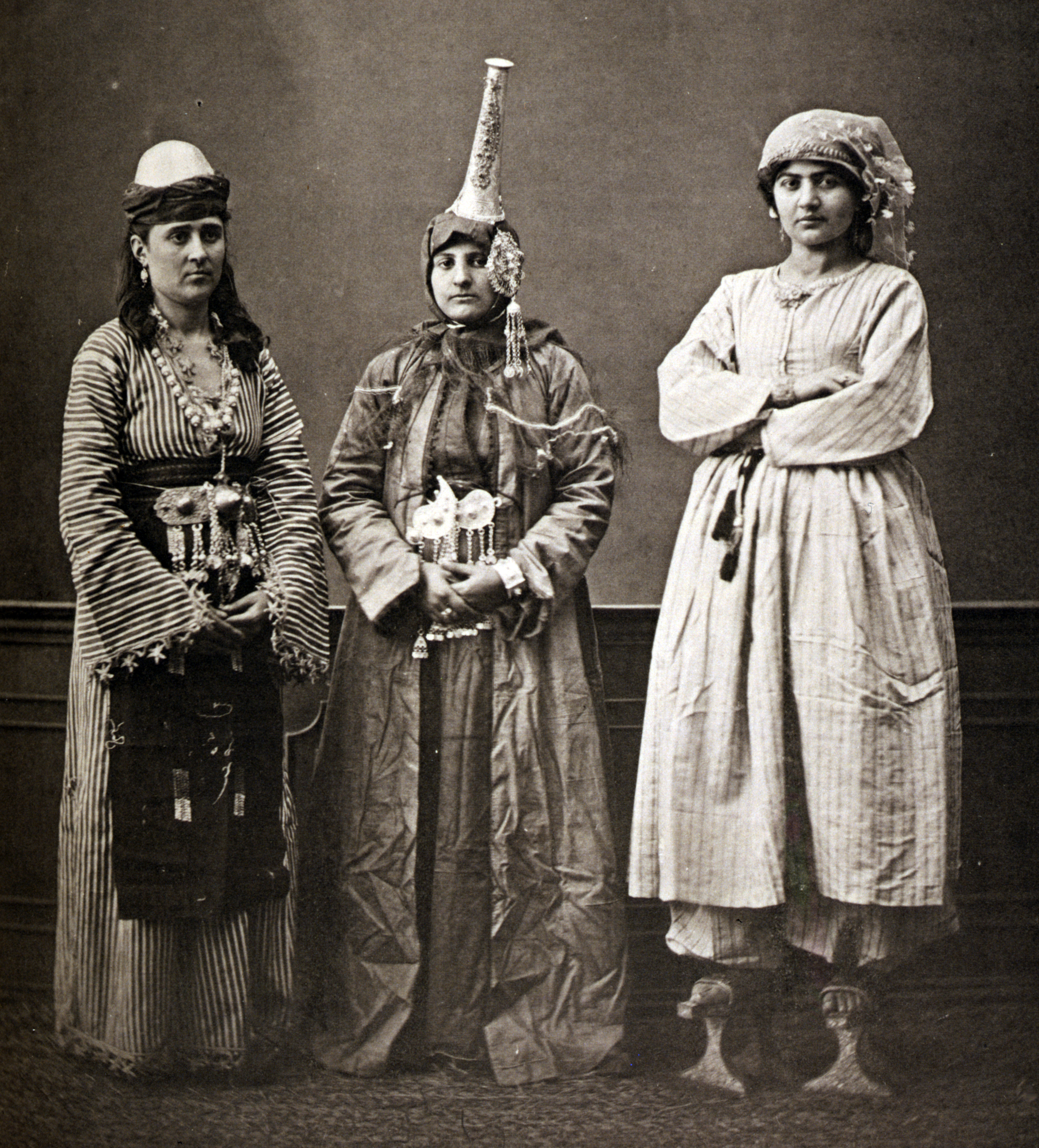
Damascus fashion, illustration from the book Popular Costumes in Turkey, 1873

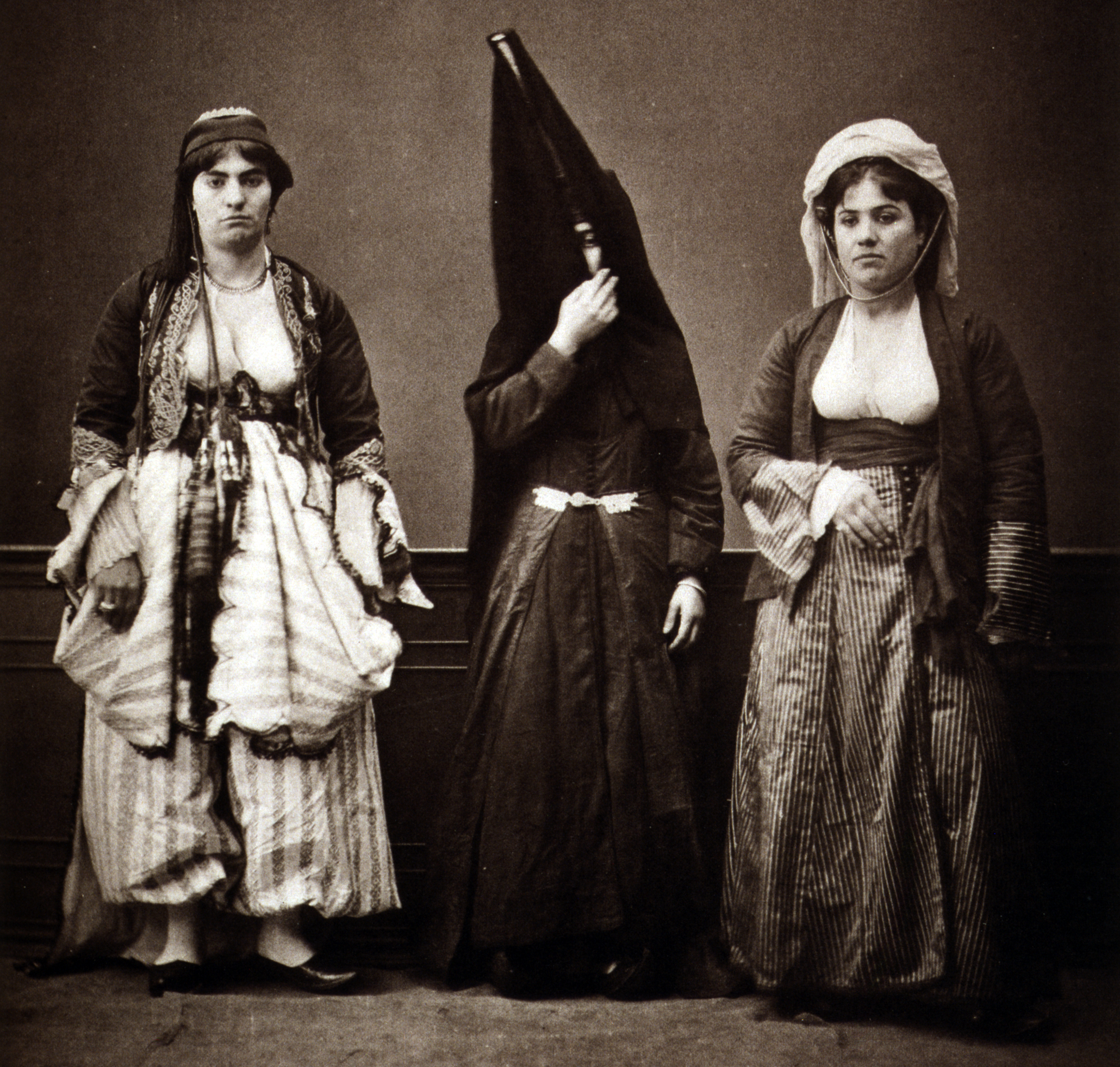
Lebanese fashion, illustration from the book Popular Costumes in Turkey, 1873

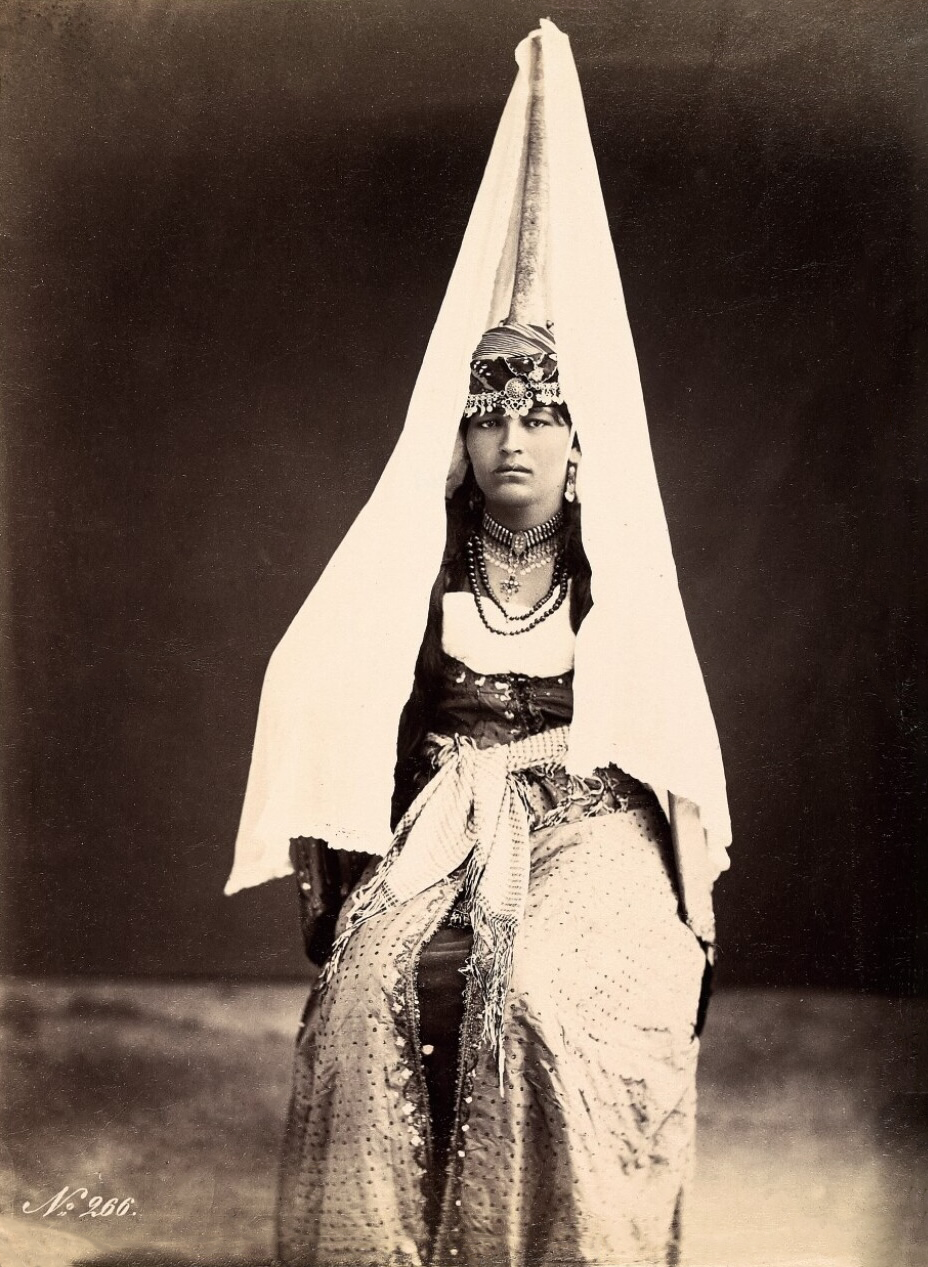
Tantour on a Druze woman in Chouf, Lebanon, 1870s

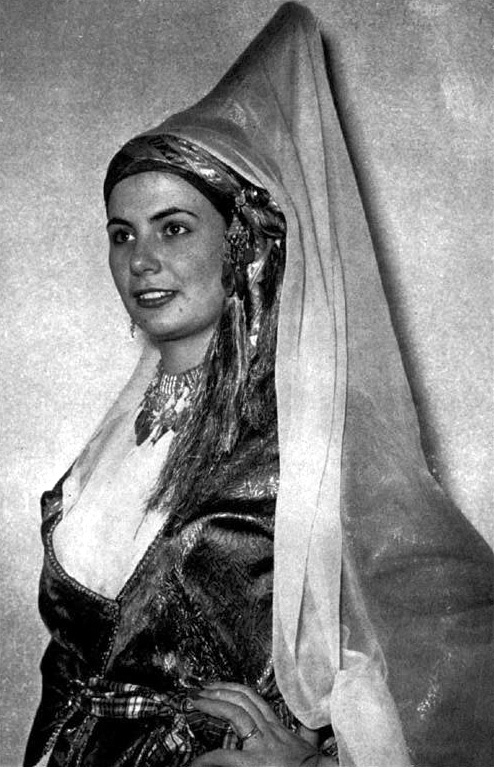
Recreated costume of a Lebanese princess from the nineteenth century, including a tantour

== See also ==
- Hennin
- Kokoshnik
- Ochipok
- Labbadeh, traditional Lebanese men's headdress
- Pointed hat
- List of hat styles
- List of headgear
