= List of state highways in Louisiana (1150–1199) =

The following is a list of state highways in the U.S. state of Louisiana designated in the 1150–1199 range.

All are owned and maintained by the Louisiana Department of Transportation and Development (La DOTD) and were designated in the 1955 Louisiana Highway renumbering. All but four of the routes on this list are proposed for deletion as part of La DOTD's Road Transfer Program.

== Louisiana Highway 1150 ==
Louisiana Highway 1150
- Location: Kinder
- Length: 0.222 mi (357 m)
- Existed: 1955–present

Louisiana Highway 1150 (LA 1150) runs 0.22 miles (0.35 km) in an east–west direction along 6th Avenue from 10th Street to US 165 in Kinder. It is currently proposed for deletion as part of La DOTD's Road Transfer program.

The entire highway is in Kinder, Allen Parish.

mi	km	Destinations	Notes
0.000	0.000	Begin state maintenance on 6th Avenue	Western terminus
0.222	0.357	US 165 – Oberlin, Lake Charles	Eastern terminus
1.000 mi = 1.609 km; 1.000 km = 0.621 mi

== Louisiana Highway 1151 ==
Louisiana Highway 1151
- Location: Oberlin
- Length: 4.703 mi (7.569 km)
- Existed: 1955–present

Louisiana Highway 1151 (LA 1151) runs 4.70 miles (7.56 km) in an east–west direction from the intersection of two local roads southwest of Oberlin to a junction with LA 26 in Oberlin. It is currently proposed for deletion as part of La DOTD's Road Transfer program.

The entire highway is in Allen Parish.

Location	mi	km	Destinations	Notes
	0.000	0.000	Begin state maintenance at intersection of Cole Road and Nursery Road	Western terminus
Oberlin	4.703	7.569	LA 26 (6th Avenue, North 5th Street)	Eastern terminus
1.000 mi = 1.609 km; 1.000 km = 0.621 mi

== Louisiana Highway 1152 ==
Louisiana Highway 1152
- Location: Oakdale
- Length: 1.458 mi (2.346 km)
- Existed: 1955–present

Louisiana Highway 1152 (LA 1152) runs 1.46 miles (2.35 km) in a north–south direction in a loop off of US 165 in Oakdale. It is currently proposed for deletion as part of La DOTD's Road Transfer program.

The entire highway is in Allen Parish.

Location	mi	km	Destinations	Notes
	0.000– 0.015	0.000– 0.024	US 165 – Oakdale, Lake Charles	Southern terminus
Oakdale	1.458	2.346	US 165 – Oakdale, Lake Charles	Northern terminus
1.000 mi = 1.609 km; 1.000 km = 0.621 mi

== Louisiana Highway 1153 ==
Louisiana Highway 1153
- Location: Oakdale–Pawnee
- Length: 5.454 mi (8.777 km)
- Existed: 1955–present

Louisiana Highway 1153 (LA 1153) runs 5.45 miles (8.77 km) in a north–south direction from US 165 in Oakdale to a second junction with US 165 at Pawnee. It is currently proposed for deletion as part of La DOTD's Road Transfer program.

The entire highway is in Allen Parish.

Location	mi	km	Destinations	Notes
Oakdale	0.000– 0.025	0.000– 0.040	US 165 – Oakdale, Alexandria	Southern terminus
Pawnee	5.433– 5.454	8.744– 8.777	US 165 – Oakdale, Alexandria	Northern terminus
1.000 mi = 1.609 km; 1.000 km = 0.621 mi

== Louisiana Highway 1154 ==
Louisiana Highway 1154
- Location: Allen Parish
- Length: 1.0 mi (1.6 km)
- Existed: 1955–1969

Louisiana Highway 1154 (LA 1154) ran 1.0 mile (1.6 km) in a north–south direction from LA 1153 to a local road at the Allen–Rapides parish line west of Pawnee. The route was transferred to local control in 1969.

Parish	Location	mi	km	Destinations	Notes
Allen		0.0	0.0	LA 1153	Southern terminus
Allen–Rapides parish line		1.0	1.6	End state maintenance	Northern terminus
1.000 mi = 1.609 km; 1.000 km = 0.621 mi

== Louisiana Highway 1155 ==
Louisiana Highway 1155
- Location: Allen Parish
- Length: 3.5 mi (5.6 km)
- Existed: 1955–1977

Louisiana Highway 1155 (LA 1155) ran 3.5 miles (5.6 km) in a north–south direction from a local road southwest of Mittie to a junction with LA 26 west of Mittie. It was transferred to local control in 1977.

The entire route was in Allen Parish.

mi	km	Destinations	Notes
0.0	0.0	Begin state maintenance at Flat Creek bridge	Southern terminus
3.5	5.6	LA 26 – Oberlin, DeRidder	Northern terminus
1.000 mi = 1.609 km; 1.000 km = 0.621 mi

== Louisiana Highway 1156 ==
Louisiana Highway 1156
- Location: Elizabeth
- Length: 3.217 mi (5.177 km)
- Existed: 1955–present

Louisiana Highway 1156 (LA 1156) runs 3.22 miles (5.18 km) in a northwest to southeast direction from LA 112 in Elizabeth to a point on Bay City Road south of town. It is currently proposed for deletion as part of La DOTD's Road Transfer program.

The entire highway is in Allen Parish.

Location	mi	km	Destinations	Notes
Elizabeth	0.000	0.000	LA 112 – DeRidder	Northwestern terminus
Elizabeth	1.176	1.893	LA 3206 (Main Street)	Southern terminus of LA 3206
	3.217	5.177	End state maintenance on Bay City Road	Southeastern terminus
1.000 mi = 1.609 km; 1.000 km = 0.621 mi

== Louisiana Highway 1157 ==
Louisiana Highway 1157
- Location: Basile
- Length: 2.333 mi (3.755 km)
- Existed: 1955–present

Louisiana Highway 1157 (LA 1157) consists of two road segments with a total length of 2.33 miles (3.75 km) that are located in the Evangeline Parish town of Basile. Both segments are currently proposed for deletion as part of La DOTD's Road Transfer program.

- LA 1157-1 spans 2.026 miles (3.261 km) along Stagg Avenue and its extension from Wilburton Lane west of Basile to LA 3277 at Fusilier Avenue within the town limits.
- LA 1157-2 spans 0.307 miles (0.494 km) along Martin Luther King Avenue and Green Street from US 190 on the Evangeline–Acadia parish line to LA 1157-1 (West Stagg Avenue).

== Louisiana Highway 1158 ==
Louisiana Highway 1158
- Location: Evangeline Parish
- Length: 1.446 mi (2.327 km)
- Existed: 1955–present

Louisiana Highway 1158 (LA 1158) runs 1.45 miles (2.33 km) in a north–south direction from LA 3277 to the intersection of two local roads north of Basile. It is currently proposed for deletion as part of La DOTD's Road Transfer program.

The entire route is in Evangeline Parish.

mi	km	Destinations	Notes
0.000	0.000	LA 3277 (Old Basile Highway)	Southern terminus
1.016	1.635	LA 1159 (Aguillard Road)	Western terminus of LA 1159
1.446	2.327	End state maintenance at intersection of Hunter Road and Christ Road	Northern terminus
1.000 mi = 1.609 km; 1.000 km = 0.621 mi

== Louisiana Highway 1159 ==
Louisiana Highway 1159
- Location: Evangeline Parish
- Length: 1.511 mi (2.432 km)
- Existed: 1955–present

Louisiana Highway 1159 (LA 1159) runs 1.51 miles (2.43 km) in an east–west direction along Aguillard Road from LA 1158 to a point beyond Ruby Road north of Basile. It is currently proposed for deletion as part of La DOTD's Road Transfer program.

The entire route is in Evangeline Parish.

mi	km	Destinations	Notes
0.000	0.000	LA 1158 (Hunter Road)	Western terminus
1.511	2.432	End state maintenance on Aguillard Road	Eastern terminus
1.000 mi = 1.609 km; 1.000 km = 0.621 mi

== Louisiana Highway 1160 ==
Louisiana Highway 1160
- Location: Mamou
- Length: 2.800 mi (4.506 km)
- Existed: 1955–present

Louisiana Highway 1160 (LA 1160) runs 2.80 miles (4.51 km) in an east–west direction from the intersection of two local roads west of Mamou to the junction of LA 104 and LA 3149 in Mamou. It is currently proposed for deletion as part of La DOTD's Road Transfer program.

The entire highway is in Evangeline Parish.

Location	mi	km	Destinations	Notes
	0.000	0.000	Begin state maintenance at intersection of Bieber Road and Mike Lane	Western terminus
Mamou	2.382	3.833	LA 13 (West Street)	
Mamou	2.800	4.506	LA 104 (Ponciana Street, 6th Street); LA 3149 (Old Highway 13)	Eastern terminus of LA 1160; southern terminus of LA 3149
1.000 mi = 1.609 km; 1.000 km = 0.621 mi

== Louisiana Highway 1161 ==
Louisiana Highway 1161
- Location: Evangeline Parish
- Length: 7.096 mi (11.420 km)
- Existed: 1955–present

Louisiana Highway 1161 (LA 1161) runs 7.10 miles (11.43 km) in an east–west direction along Pine Point Road from LA 104 east of Mamou to LA 29 south of Ville Platte.

The entire route is in Evangeline Parish.

mi	km	Destinations	Notes
0.000	0.000	LA 104 (Pine Point Road, L'Anse Bleau Road) – Mamou, Opelousas	Western terminus
4.922	7.921	LA 3097 (Snooks Road)	Southern terminus of LA 3097
7.096	11.420	LA 29 (South Chataignier Road) – Ville Platte, Chataignier	Eastern terminus
1.000 mi = 1.609 km; 1.000 km = 0.621 mi

== Louisiana Highway 1162 ==
Louisiana Highway 1162
- Location: Evangeline Parish
- Length: 1.602 mi (2.578 km)
- Existed: 1955–present

Louisiana Highway 1162 (LA 1162) runs 1.60 miles (2.57 km) in a northeast to southwest direction from a local road to a junction with LA 29 southwest of Chataignier. The route's mileposts increase from the northern or eastern end contrary to common practice. It is currently proposed for deletion as part of La DOTD's Road Transfer program.

The entire route is in Evangeline Parish.

mi	km	Destinations	Notes
1.602	2.578	Begin state maintenance at Keith Duplechian Road	Southwestern terminus
0.000	0.000	LA 29 (Chatangia Road) – Chataignier, Eunice	Northeastern terminus
1.000 mi = 1.609 km; 1.000 km = 0.621 mi

== Louisiana Highway 1163 ==
Louisiana Highway 1163
- Location: Chataignier–Point Blue
- Length: 5.185 mi (8.344 km)
- Existed: 1955–present

Louisiana Highway 1163 (LA 1163) runs 5.19 miles (8.35 km) in a north–south direction from the concurrent LA 29 and LA 95 in Chataignier to LA 104 in Point Blue. It is currently proposed for deletion as part of La DOTD's Road Transfer program.

The entire highway is in Evangeline Parish.

Location	mi	km	Destinations	Notes
Chataignier	0.000	0.000	LA 29 / LA 95 (Vine Street)	Southern terminus
	3.589	5.776	LA 1164 (Regal Road)	Western terminus of LA 1164
Point Blue	5.185	8.344	LA 104 (L'Anse Bleau Road) – Mamou	Northern terminus
1.000 mi = 1.609 km; 1.000 km = 0.621 mi

== Louisiana Highway 1164 ==
Louisiana Highway 1164
- Location: Evangeline Parish
- Length: 1.035 mi (1.666 km)
- Existed: 1955–present

Louisiana Highway 1164 (LA 1164) runs 1.04 miles (1.67 km) in an east–west direction along Regal Road from LA 1163 to LA 29 north of Chataignier. It is currently proposed for deletion as part of La DOTD's Road Transfer program.

The entire route is in Evangeline Parish.

mi	km	Destinations	Notes
0.000	0.000	LA 1163 (Perron Road)	Western terminus
1.035	1.666	LA 29 (South Chataignier Road) – Ville Platte, Eunice	Eastern terminus
1.000 mi = 1.609 km; 1.000 km = 0.621 mi

== Louisiana Highway 1165 ==
Louisiana Highway 1165
- Location: Evangeline Parish
- Length: 3.800 mi (6.116 km)
- Existed: 1955–present

Louisiana Highway 1165 (LA 1165) runs 3.80 miles (6.12 km) in a southwest to northeast direction along L'Anse Aux Pailles Road from LA 29 to LA 104 northeast of Chataignier. It is currently proposed for deletion as part of La DOTD's Road Transfer program.

The entire route is in Evangeline Parish.

mi	km	Destinations	Notes
0.000	0.000	LA 29 (Chataignier Road) – Chataignier, Ville Platte	Western terminus
1.833	2.950	LA 1166	Southern terminus of LA 1166
3.800	6.116	LA 104 (Praire Rhonde Road) – Point Blue, Opelousas	Eastern terminus
1.000 mi = 1.609 km; 1.000 km = 0.621 mi

== Louisiana Highway 1166 ==
Louisiana Highway 1166
- Location: Evangeline Parish
- Length: 1.684 mi (2.710 km)
- Existed: 1955–present

Louisiana Highway 1166 (LA 1166) runs 1.68 miles (2.70 km) in a north–south direction from LA 1165 to LA 104 northeast of Chataignier. It is currently proposed for deletion as part of La DOTD's Road Transfer program.

The entire route is in Evangeline Parish.

mi	km	Destinations	Notes
0.000	0.000	LA 1165 (L'Anse Aux Pailles Road)	Southern terminus
1.684	2.710	LA 104 (Praire Rhonde Road) – Point Blue, Opelousas	Northern terminus
1.000 mi = 1.609 km; 1.000 km = 0.621 mi

== Louisiana Highway 1167 ==
Louisiana Highway 1167
- Location: Evangeline Parish
- Length: 1.079 mi (1.736 km)
- Existed: 1955–present

Louisiana Highway 1167 (LA 1167) runs 1.08 miles (1.74 km) in an east–west direction along L'Anse De Cavailer Road from LA 104 to a point near Batier Road northeast of Chataignier. It is currently proposed for deletion as part of La DOTD's Road Transfer program.

The entire route is in Evangeline Parish.

mi	km	Destinations	Notes
0.000	0.000	LA 104 (Praire Rhonde Road) – Point Blue, Opelousas	Western terminus
1.079	1.736	End state maintenance on L'Anse De Cavailer Road	Eastern terminus
1.000 mi = 1.609 km; 1.000 km = 0.621 mi

== Louisiana Highway 1168 ==
Louisiana Highway 1168
- Location: Ville Platte
- Length: 5.931 mi (9.545 km)
- Existed: 1955–present

Louisiana Highway 1168 (LA 1168) runs 5.93 miles (9.54 km) in a northwest to southeast direction along Belaire Cove Road from the concurrent US 167 and LA 10 in Ville Platte to a local road at the Evangeline–St. Landry parish line southeast of Ville Platte. It is currently proposed for deletion as part of La DOTD's Road Transfer program.

Parish	Location	mi	km	Destinations	Notes
Evangeline	Ville Platte	0.000	0.000	US 167 / LA 10 (East Main Street)	Northwestern terminus
Evangeline–St. Landry parish line		5.931	9.545	End state maintenance at Bayou Grand Louis bridge	Southeastern terminus
1.000 mi = 1.609 km; 1.000 km = 0.621 mi

== Louisiana Highway 1169 ==
Louisiana Highway 1169
- Location: Evangeline Parish
- Length: 1.155 mi (1.859 km)
- Existed: 1955–present

Louisiana Highway 1169 (LA 1169) runs 1.16 miles (1.87 km) in a north–south direction along P Z Road from LA 748 to LA 363 east of Ville Platte. It is currently proposed for deletion as part of La DOTD's Road Transfer program.

The entire route is in Evangeline Parish.

mi	km	Destinations	Notes
0.000– 0.016	0.000– 0.026	LA 748 (Grand Prairie Road) – Ville Platte, Grand Prairie	Southern terminus
1.137– 1.155	1.830– 1.859	LA 363 (Faubourg Road)	Northern terminus
1.000 mi = 1.609 km; 1.000 km = 0.621 mi

== Louisiana Highway 1170 ==
Louisiana Highway 1170
- Location: Evangeline Parish
- Length: 2.0 mi (3.2 km)
- Existed: 1955–1988

Louisiana Highway 1170 (LA 1170) ran 2.0 miles (3.2 km) in a north–south direction from LA 363 to LA 29 northeast of Ville Platte. The route became part of LA 29 in 1988.

The entire route was in Evangeline Parish.

mi	km	Destinations	Notes
0.0	0.0	LA 363 – Ville Platte	Southern terminus
2.0	3.2	LA 29 – Bunkie	Northern terminus
1.000 mi = 1.609 km; 1.000 km = 0.621 mi

== Louisiana Highway 1171 ==
Louisiana Highway 1171
- Location: Ville Platte–Tate Cove
- Length: 4.364 mi (7.023 km)
- Existed: 1955–present

Louisiana Highway 1171 (LA 1171) runs 3.36 miles (5.41 km) in a north–south direction along Tate Cove Road from LA 29 in Ville Platte to a point north of Tate Cove. It is currently proposed for deletion as part of La DOTD's Road Transfer program.

The entire highway is in Evangeline Parish.

Location	mi	km	Destinations	Notes
Ville Platte	0.000	0.000	LA 29 south (Tate Cove Road) – Ville Platte LA 29 north (Whiteville Road) to I-49 – Bunkie	Southern terminus
Tate Cove	3.324	5.349	LA 3247 (Cabot Road) to I-49 – Bunkie	Western terminus of LA 3247
	4.364	7.023	End state maintenance at Cazan Lake Road	Northern terminus
1.000 mi = 1.609 km; 1.000 km = 0.621 mi

== Louisiana Highway 1172 ==
Louisiana Highway 1172
- Location: Evangeline Parish
- Length: 4.792 mi (7.712 km)
- Existed: 1955–present

Louisiana Highway 1172 (LA 1172) runs 4.79 miles (7.71 km) in a general north–south direction along Heritage Road from LA 376 north of Vidrine to LA 13 south of Pine Prairie. It is currently proposed for deletion as part of La DOTD's Road Transfer program.

The entire route is in Evangeline Parish.

mi	km	Destinations	Notes
0.000	0.000	LA 376 (Heritage Road, Millers Lake Road)	Southern terminus
4.792	7.712	LA 13 (Veterans Memorial Highway) – Pine Prairie, Barber Spur	Northern terminus
1.000 mi = 1.609 km; 1.000 km = 0.621 mi

== Louisiana Highway 1173 ==
Louisiana Highway 1173
- Location: Evangeline Parish
- Length: 1.6 mi (2.6 km)
- Existed: 1955–2002

Louisiana Highway 1173 (LA 1173) ran 1.6 miles (2.6 km) in a north–south direction from a dead end at Lake Chicot to a junction with LA 106 west of St. Landry. The route served as an access road to Lake Chicot State Park and was transferred to local control in 2002.

The entire route was in Evangeline Parish.

mi	km	Destinations	Notes
0.0	0.0	Dead end at Lake Chicot	Southern terminus
1.6	2.6	LA 106 (St. Landry Highway) – Pine Prairie, Bunkie	Northern terminus
1.000 mi = 1.609 km; 1.000 km = 0.621 mi

== Louisiana Highway 1174 ==
Louisiana Highway 1174
- Location: Chataignier
- Length: 0.192 mi (309 m)
- Existed: 1955–present

Louisiana Highway 1174 (LA 1174) runs 0.19 miles (0.31 km) in an east–west direction between two junctions with LA 29 and LA 95 in Chataignier. It is currently proposed for deletion as part of La DOTD's Road Transfer program.

The entire highway is in Chataignier, Evangeline Parish.

mi	km	Destinations	Notes
0.000	0.000	LA 29 north / LA 95 (Vine Street) LA 29 south (South 1st Street)	Western terminus
0.192	0.309	LA 29 / LA 95 (Vine Street)	Eastern terminus
1.000 mi = 1.609 km; 1.000 km = 0.621 mi

== Louisiana Highway 1175 ==
Louisiana Highway 1175
- Location: Gold Dust
- Length: 0.854 mi (1,374 m)
- Existed: 1955–present

Louisiana Highway 1175 (LA 1175) runs 0.85 miles (1.37 km) in an east–west direction from LA 29 west of Gold Dust to a local road in Gold Dust. It is currently proposed for deletion as part of La DOTD's Road Transfer program.

The entire highway is in Avoyelles Parish.

Location	mi	km	Destinations	Notes
	0.000	0.000	LA 29 – Bunkie, Ville Platte	Western terminus
Gold Dust	0.854	1.374	End state maintenance at Walton Lane	Eastern terminus
1.000 mi = 1.609 km; 1.000 km = 0.621 mi

== Louisiana Highway 1176 ==
Louisiana Highway 1176
- Location: Avoyelles Parish
- Length: 8.163 mi (13.137 km)
- Existed: 1955–present

Louisiana Highway 1176 (LA 1176) runs 8.16 miles (13.13 km) in a general east–west direction from LA 115 west of Bunkie to US 71 southeast of Bunkie.

The entire highway is in Avoyelles Parish.

Location	mi	km	Destinations	Notes
Haas	0.000	0.000	LA 115 – Bunkie, Lone Pine	Western terminus
Eola	4.237	6.819	LA 29 – Bunkie	
	8.163	13.137	US 71 – Bunkie	Eastern terminus
1.000 mi = 1.609 km; 1.000 km = 0.621 mi

== Louisiana Highway 1177 ==
Louisiana Highway 1177
- Location: Bunkie
- Length: 2.942 mi (4.735 km)
- Existed: 1955–present

Louisiana Highway 1177 (LA 1177) runs 2.94 miles (4.73 km) in a northwest to southeast direction from US 71 northwest of Bunkie to a second junction with US 71 in Bunkie. It is currently proposed for deletion as part of La DOTD's Road Transfer program.

Parish	Location	mi	km	Destinations	Notes
Rapides		0.000	0.000	US 71 – Bunkie, Cheneyville	Northwestern terminus
Avoyelles	Bunkie	2.942	4.735	US 71 (Northwest Main Street)	Southeastern terminus
1.000 mi = 1.609 km; 1.000 km = 0.621 mi

== Louisiana Highway 1178 ==
Louisiana Highway 1178
- Location: Morrow–Evergreen
- Length: 7.472 mi (12.025 km)
- Existed: 1955–present

Louisiana Highway 1178 (LA 1178) runs 7.47 miles (12.02 km) in a north–south direction from US 71 northwest of Morrow to LA 29 in Evergreen.

The entire highway is in Avoyelles Parish.

Location	mi	km	Destinations	Notes
	0.000	0.000	US 71 – Bunkie, Baton Rouge	Southern terminus
Evergreen	7.472	12.025	LA 29 (Main Street) – Bunkie, Cottonport	Northern terminus
1.000 mi = 1.609 km; 1.000 km = 0.621 mi

== Louisiana Highway 1179 ==
Louisiana Highway 1179
- Location: Avoyelles Parish
- Length: 6.546 mi (10.535 km)
- Existed: 1955–present

Louisiana Highway 1179 (LA 1179) runs 6.55 miles (10.54 km) in a general east–west direction from LA 107 southwest of Plaucheville to a second junction with LA 107 southeast of Plaucheville. It is currently proposed for deletion as part of La DOTD's Road Transfer program.

The entire highway is in Avoyelles Parish.

Location	mi	km	Destinations	Notes
Hickory	0.000	0.000	LA 107 – Plaucheville, Cottonport	Western terminus
	2.586	4.162	LA 1180 north	Western end of LA 1180 concurrency
Bodoc	3.428	5.517	LA 1180 south	Eastern end of LA 1180 concurrency
Dupont	6.546	10.535	LA 107 – Plaucheville, Morrow	Eastern terminus
1.000 mi = 1.609 km; 1.000 km = 0.621 mi: Concurrency terminus

== Louisiana Highway 1180 ==
Louisiana Highway 1180
- Location: Avoyelles Parish
- Length: 4.060 mi (6.534 km)
- Existed: 1955–present

Louisiana Highway 1180 (LA 1180) runs 4.06 miles (6.53 km) in a general north–south direction from a local road south of Bodoc to LA 107 south of Plaucheville. It is currently proposed for deletion as part of La DOTD's Road Transfer program.

The entire highway is in Avoyelles Parish.

Location	mi	km	Destinations	Notes
	0.000	0.000	Begin state maintenance at Spring Bayou Road	Southern terminus
Bodoc	2.054	3.306	LA 1179 east	Southern end of LA 1179 concurrency
	2.896	4.661	LA 1179 west	Northern end of LA 1179 concurrency
	4.043– 4.060	6.507– 6.534	LA 107 – Plaucheville, Morrow	Northern terminus
1.000 mi = 1.609 km; 1.000 km = 0.621 mi: Concurrency terminus

== Louisiana Highway 1181 ==
Louisiana Highway 1181
- Location: Plaucheville
- Length: 5.571 mi (8.966 km)
- Existed: 1955–present

Louisiana Highway 1181 (LA 1181) runs 5.57 miles (8.96 km) in a general east–west direction from LA 107 in Plaucheville to a local road east of Plaucheville. It is currently proposed for deletion as part of La DOTD's Road Transfer program.

The entire highway is in Avoyelles Parish.

Location	mi	km	Destinations	Notes
Plaucheville	0.000	0.000	LA 107 – Cottonport, Morrow	Western terminus
	1.236	1.989	LA 1182 – Moreauville	Western terminus of LA 1182
	2.838	4.567	LA 1182	Eastern terminus of LA 1182
	5.571	8.966	End state maintenance on eastern side of Bayou Des Glaises Diversion Channel bridge	Eastern terminus
1.000 mi = 1.609 km; 1.000 km = 0.621 mi

== Louisiana Highway 1182 ==
Louisiana Highway 1182
- Location: Avoyelles Parish
- Length: 2.434 mi (3.917 km)
- Existed: 1955–present

Louisiana Highway 1182 (LA 1182) runs 2.43 miles (3.91 km) in a loop off of LA 1181 northeast of Plaucheville. It is currently proposed for deletion as part of La DOTD's Road Transfer program.

The entire route is in Avoyelles Parish.

mi	km	Destinations	Notes
0.000	0.000	LA 1181	Western terminus
2.434	3.917	LA 1181	Eastern terminus
1.000 mi = 1.609 km; 1.000 km = 0.621 mi

== Louisiana Highway 1183 ==
Louisiana Highway 1183
- Location: Avoyelles Parish
- Length: 6.535 mi (10.517 km)
- Existed: 1955–present

Louisiana Highway 1183 (LA 1183) runs 6.54 miles (10.53 km) in a north–south direction from LA 105 in Odenburg to LA 1 west of Simmesport. It is currently proposed for deletion as part of La DOTD's Road Transfer program.

The entire highway is in Avoyelles Parish.

Location	mi	km	Destinations	Notes
Odenburg	0.000	0.000	LA 105 – Simmesport, Melville	Southern terminus
	6.535	10.517	LA 1 – Simmesport, Marksville	Northern terminus
1.000 mi = 1.609 km; 1.000 km = 0.621 mi

== Louisiana Highway 1184 ==
Louisiana Highway 1184
- Location: Avoyelles Parish
- Length: 3.284 mi (5.285 km)
- Existed: 1955–present

Louisiana Highway 1184 (LA 1184) runs 3.28 miles (5.28 km) in a loop off of LA 29 west of Cottonport. It is currently proposed for deletion as part of La DOTD's Road Transfer program.

The entire route is in Avoyelles Parish.

mi	km	Destinations	Notes
0.000	0.000	LA 29 – Cottonport, Bunkie	Western terminus
3.284	5.285	LA 29 – Cottonport, Bunkie	Eastern terminus
1.000 mi = 1.609 km; 1.000 km = 0.621 mi

== Louisiana Highway 1185 ==
Louisiana Highway 1185
- Location: Avoyelles Parish
- Length: 3.595 mi (5.786 km)
- Existed: 1955–present

Louisiana Highway 1185 (LA 1185) runs 3.60 miles (5.79 km) in a southwest to northeast direction from LA 107 north of Cottonport to LA 114 southeast of Mansura. It is currently proposed for deletion as part of La DOTD's Road Transfer program.

The entire route is in Avoyelles Parish.

mi	km	Destinations	Notes
0.000	0.000	LA 107 – Cottonport, Mansura	Western terminus
3.595	5.786	LA 114 – Mansura, Moreauville	Eastern terminus
1.000 mi = 1.609 km; 1.000 km = 0.621 mi

== Louisiana Highway 1186 ==
Louisiana Highway 1186
- Location: Mansura
- Length: 1.318 mi (2.121 km)
- Existed: 1955–present

Louisiana Highway 1186 (LA 1186) runs 1.32 miles (2.12 km) in an east–west direction from LA 114 in Mansura to LA 1 east of Mansura. It is currently proposed for deletion as part of La DOTD's Road Transfer program.

The entire highway is in Avoyelles Parish.

Location	mi	km	Destinations	Notes
Mansura	0.000	0.000	LA 114 (L'Eglise Street)	Western terminus
	1.298– 1.318	2.089– 2.121	LA 1 – Marksville, Simmesport	Eastern terminus
1.000 mi = 1.609 km; 1.000 km = 0.621 mi

== Louisiana Highway 1187 ==
Louisiana Highway 1187
- Location: Mansura
- Length: 4.971 mi (8.000 km)
- Existed: 1955–present

Louisiana Highway 1187 (LA 1187) runs 4.97 miles (8.00 km) in a loop off of LA 114 west of Mansura. The route's mileposts increase from the eastern end contrary to common practice. It is currently proposed for deletion as part of La DOTD's Road Transfer program.

The entire highway is in Avoyelles Parish.

Location	mi	km	Destinations	Notes
	4.971	8.000	LA 114 – Mansura, Hessmer	Western terminus
Mansura	0.000	0.000	LA 114 (Baton Rouge Avenue)	Eastern terminus
1.000 mi = 1.609 km; 1.000 km = 0.621 mi

== Louisiana Highway 1188 ==
Louisiana Highway 1188
- Location: Avoyelles Parish
- Length: 2.613 mi (4.205 km)
- Existed: 1955–present

Louisiana Highway 1188 (LA 1188) runs 2.61 miles (4.20 km) in a north–south direction from LA 115 southwest of Hessmer to LA 114 west of Hessmer. It is currently proposed for deletion as part of La DOTD's Road Transfer program.

The entire route is in Avoyelles Parish.

mi	km	Destinations	Notes
0.000	0.000	LA 115 – Hessmer, Bunkie	Southern terminus
2.613	4.205	LA 114 – Hessmer, Alexandria	Northern terminus
1.000 mi = 1.609 km; 1.000 km = 0.621 mi

== Louisiana Highway 1189 ==
Louisiana Highway 1189
- Location: Marksville
- Length: 0.635 mi (1,022 m)
- Existed: 1955–present

Louisiana Highway 1189 (LA 1189) runs 0.64 miles (1.03 km) in an east–west direction along Acton Road from LA 115 to LA 452 in Marksville. It is currently proposed for deletion as part of La DOTD's Road Transfer program.

The entire highway is in Marksville, Avoyelles Parish.

mi	km	Destinations	Notes
0.000	0.000	LA 115 (South Main Street)	Western terminus
0.559	0.900	LA 1 / LA 107 (Tunica Drive East)	
0.635	1.022	LA 452 (South Preston Street)	Eastern terminus; to Marksville State Historic Site
1.000 mi = 1.609 km; 1.000 km = 0.621 mi

== Louisiana Highway 1190 ==
Louisiana Highway 1190
- Location: Marksville
- Length: 1.576 mi (2.536 km)
- Existed: 1955–present

Louisiana Highway 1190 (LA 1190) runs 1.58 miles (2.54 km) in an east–west direction along Spring Bayou Road from the concurrent LA 107 and LA 115 in Marksville to Little River Road east of Marksville. Except for the portion west of LA 452, it is currently proposed for deletion as part of La DOTD's Road Transfer program.

The entire highway is in Avoyelles Parish.

Location	mi	km	Destinations	Notes
Marksville	0.000	0.000	LA 107 / LA 115 (North Main Street)	Western terminus
Marksville	0.187	0.301	LA 452 (North Preston Street)	
	1.576	2.536	End state maintenance at intersection of Spring Bayou Road and Little River Road	Eastern terminus
1.000 mi = 1.609 km; 1.000 km = 0.621 mi

== Louisiana Highway 1191 ==
Louisiana Highway 1191
- Location: Avoyelles Parish
- Length: 1.739 mi (2.799 km)
- Existed: 1955–present

Louisiana Highway 1191 (LA 1191) runs 1.74 miles (2.80 km) in an east–west direction from LA 1 to the concurrent LA 107 and LA 115 north of Marksville. It is currently proposed for deletion as part of La DOTD's Road Transfer program.

The entire route is in Avoyelles Parish.

mi	km	Destinations	Notes
0.000	0.000	LA 1 – Marksville, Alexandria	Western terminus
1.739	2.799	LA 107 / LA 115 – Marksville, Alexandria	Eastern terminus
1.000 mi = 1.609 km; 1.000 km = 0.621 mi

== Louisiana Highway 1192 ==
Louisiana Highway 1192
- Location: Marksville
- Length: 7.912 mi (12.733 km)
- Existed: 1955–present

Louisiana Highway 1192 (LA 1192) runs 7.91 miles (12.73 km) in a general east–west direction from LA 1 northwest of Marksville to the concurrent LA 107/LA 115 in Marksville. It is currently proposed for deletion as part of La DOTD's Road Transfer program.

The entire highway is in Avoyelles Parish.

Location	mi	km	Destinations	Notes
	0.000	0.000	LA 1 – Marksville, Alexandria	Western terminus
	1.820– 1.858	2.929– 2.990	LA 107 south / LA 115 south – Marksville	Western end of LA 107/LA 115 concurrency
	1.975	3.178	LA 107 north / LA 115 north – Alexandria	Eastern end of LA 107/LA 115 concurrency
Marksville	7.912	12.733	LA 107 / LA 115 (North Main Street)	Eastern terminus
1.000 mi = 1.609 km; 1.000 km = 0.621 mi

== Louisiana Highway 1193 ==
Louisiana Highway 1193
- Location: Avoyelles Parish
- Length: 2.340 mi (3.766 km)
- Existed: 1955–present

Louisiana Highway 1193 (LA 1193) runs 2.34 miles (3.77 km) in an east–west direction from LA 453 to the concurrent LA 107 and LA 115 northwest of Marksville. It is currently proposed for deletion as part of La DOTD's Road Transfer program.

The entire route is in Avoyelles Parish.

mi	km	Destinations	Notes
0.000	0.000	LA 453	Western terminus
2.340	3.766	LA 107 / LA 115 – Marksville, Alexandria	Eastern terminus
1.000 mi = 1.609 km; 1.000 km = 0.621 mi

== Louisiana Highway 1194 ==
Louisiana Highway 1194
- Location: Avoyelles Parish
- Length: 3.421 mi (5.506 km)
- Existed: 1955–present

Louisiana Highway 1194 (LA 1194) runs 3.42 miles (5.50 km) in a general east–west direction from LA 1 in Fifth Ward to the intersection of two local roads southeast of Fifth Ward. The route has a spur that travels 0.18 miles (0.29 km) along Schoolhouse Road from LA 1 to LA 1194 in Fifth Ward. Both LA 1194 and its spur are currently proposed for deletion as part of La DOTD's Road Transfer program.

The entire highway is in Avoyelles Parish.

Location	mi	km	Destinations	Notes
Fifth Ward	0.000	0.000	LA 1 – Marksville, Alexandria	Northwestern terminus
Fifth Ward	0.184	0.296	LA 1194 Spur (Schoolhouse Road)	Eastern terminus of LA 1194 Spur
	3.421	5.506	End state maintenance at intersection of Island Road and Little California Road	Southeastern terminus; to Grand Cote National Wildlife Refuge
1.000 mi = 1.609 km; 1.000 km = 0.621 mi

== Louisiana Highway 1195 ==
Louisiana Highway 1195
- Location: Avoyelles Parish
- Length: 1.503 mi (2.419 km)
- Existed: 1955–present

Louisiana Highway 1195 (LA 1195) runs 1.50 miles (2.41 km) in a southeast to northwest direction from LA 1 to the intersection of two local roads north of Fifth Ward. It is currently proposed for deletion as part of La DOTD's Road Transfer program.

The entire route is in Avoyelles Parish.

mi	km	Destinations	Notes
0.000	0.000	LA 1 – Marksville, Alexandria	Southern terminus
1.503	2.419	End state maintenance at intersection of H. Dauzat Road and River Road	Northern terminus
1.000 mi = 1.609 km; 1.000 km = 0.621 mi

== Louisiana Highway 1196 ==
Louisiana Highway 1196
- Location: Avoyelles Parish
- Length: 8.355 mi (13.446 km)
- Existed: 1955–present

Louisiana Highway 1196 (LA 1196) runs 8.36 miles (13.45 km) in an east–west direction from the concurrent LA 107 and LA 115 in Effie to a local road in Dunlap. It is currently proposed to be extended northeast for approximately 13.5 miles (21.7 km) along existing local roads to a connection with LA 3102 in southern Catahoula Parish.

The entire highway is in Avoyelles Parish.

Location	mi	km	Destinations	Notes
Effie	0.000	0.000	LA 107 / LA 115 – Marksville, Alexandria	Western terminus
Dunlap	8.355	13.446	End state maintenance at Vick Road	Eastern terminus
1.000 mi = 1.609 km; 1.000 km = 0.621 mi

== Louisiana Highway 1197 ==
Louisiana Highway 1197
- Location: Avoyelles Parish
- Length: 4.2 mi (6.8 km)
- Existed: 1955–c. 1957

Louisiana Highway 1197 (LA 1197) ran 4.2 miles (6.8 km) in a north–south direction from the concurrent LA 107 and LA 115 in Effie to a local road north of Effie. The route was transferred to local control by 1958.

The entire highway was in Avoyelles Parish.

Location	mi	km	Destinations	Notes
Effie	0.0	0.0	LA 107 / LA 115 – Marksville, Alexandria	Southern terminus
	4.2	6.8	End state maintenance	Northern terminus
1.000 mi = 1.609 km; 1.000 km = 0.621 mi

== Louisiana Highway 1198 ==
Louisiana Highway 1198
- Location: Rapides Parish
- Length: 1.076 mi (1.732 km)
- Existed: 1955–present

Louisiana Highway 1198 (LA 1198) runs 1.08 miles (1.74 km) in a north–south direction along Hathorne Road from LA 1 at Richland to LA 457 north of Richland. It is currently proposed for deletion as part of La DOTD's Road Transfer program.

The entire highway is in Rapides Parish.

Location	mi	km	Destinations	Notes
Richland	0.000	0.000	LA 1 – Alexandria, Marksville	Southern terminus
	1.076	1.732	LA 457	Northern terminus
1.000 mi = 1.609 km; 1.000 km = 0.621 mi

== Louisiana Highway 1199 ==
Louisiana Highway 1199
- Location: Rapides Parish
- Length: 6.827 mi (10.987 km)
- Existed: 1955–present

Louisiana Highway 1199 (LA 1199) runs 6.83 miles (10.99 km) in a north–south direction from LA 112 in Elmer to LA 121 in Otis. It is currently proposed for deletion as part of La DOTD's Road Transfer program.

The entire highway is in Rapides Parish.

Location	mi	km	Destinations	Notes
Elmer	0.000	0.000	LA 112 – Hineston, Forest Hill	Southern terminus
	1.584	2.549	LA 488 (Twin Bridges Road) – Alexandria	
Otis	6.827	10.987	LA 121 – Hineston, Gardner	Northern terminus
1.000 mi = 1.609 km; 1.000 km = 0.621 mi
