= Louisiana Highway 114 =

State highway in Louisiana, United States

Louisiana Highway 114

- Route of LA 114 highlighted in red

Route information
- Maintained by Louisiana DOTD
- Length: 20.857 mi (33.566 km)
- Existed: 1955 renumbering–present
- Tourist routes: Louisiana Scenic Byway: Louisiana Colonial Trails

Major junctions
- West end: LA 1 east of Echo
- LA 115 in Hessmer; LA 107 in Mansura; LA 29 in Long Bridge
- East end: LA 1 / LA 451 east of Moreauville

Location
- Country: United States
- State: Louisiana
- Parishes: Avoyelles

Highway system
- Louisiana State Highway System; Interstate; US; State; Scenic
← LA 113	→ LA 115

Louisiana Highway 114 (LA 114) is a state highway located in Avoyelles Parish, Louisiana. It runs 20.86 miles (33.57 km) in an east–west direction from LA 1 east of Echo to a second junction with LA 1 and LA 451 east of Moreauville.

LA 114 essentially cuts off a long bend in LA 1, bypassing the city of Marksville to the south. The route travels instead through the smaller communities of Hessmer, Mansura, and Moreauville. Through traffic southeast of Mansura is directed from LA 114 onto LA 1186, connecting to LA 1 northwest of Moreauville, which leads to Simmesport and eventually into the Baton Rouge metropolitan area.

LA 114 was designated in the 1955 Louisiana Highway renumbering, replacing a portion of former State Route 72 and the entirety of State Route 299. In 1965, the route was extended from its original eastern terminus in Mansura over the former alignment of LA 1, which was moved to a straighter path along the Kansas City Southern Railway line. However, this portion of the route, which is now classified as a local road, is intended to be deleted from the state highway system as part of the Louisiana Department of Transportation and Development (La DOTD) Road Transfer Program.

== Route description ==
From the west, LA 114 begins at a T-intersection with LA 1 at the Red River in western Avoyelles Parish. This junction is located 1.6 miles (2.6 km) east of Echo, a small community in neighboring Rapides Parish and 2.9 miles (4.7 km) southwest of Fifth Ward. LA 114 crosses the Kansas City Southern Railway (KCS) at grade then follows the rail line southeast through a rural area known as Belle d'Eau. Here, the highway crosses Choctaw Bayou just outside the Grand Cote National Wildlife Refuge. After curving due east, LA 114 intersects LA 1188, which connects to LA 115 south of Hessmer. LA 114 continues into the village of Hessmer on West School Street and intersects LA 115 (Main Street), which connects to the nearby cities of Marksville and Bunkie. LA 114 turns south, running briefly concurrent with LA 115, before resuming an eastward course along East Main Street. Exiting Hessmer, LA 114 proceeds a short distance into the larger town of Mansura, where it becomes known as Baton Rouge Avenue.

In Mansura, LA 114 intersects LA 107 (Valley Street), and the two highways continue east in a concurrency for one block along Baton Rouge Avenue to L'Eglise Street. Here, LA 115 turns north toward Marksville while LA 114 turns to the southeast, intersecting LA 1186 at the southern limit of Mansura. Signage directs through traffic bound for Simmesport and Baton Rouge to follow LA 1186 eastward, as it provides a direct connection to southbound LA 1 that largely bypasses Moreauville. 2.5 miles (4.0 km) later, LA 114 crosses Bayou Des Glaises at Long Bridge and immediately intersects the northern terminus of LA 29, another connection to Bunkie.

After cutting across a small bend in the waterway, LA 114 closely follows Bayou Des Glaises as it winds its way into the village of Moreauville. Now known as Bayou Des Glaise Street, LA 114 proceeds to an intersection with Main Street and turns due east. The roadway along Bayou Des Glaises continues straight ahead as LA 451 toward LA 1. After following Main Street through town, LA 114 continues a short distance until reaching its eastern terminus at a second intersection with both LA 1 and LA 451, essentially cutting across a massive bend in Bayou Des Glaises. From this junction, located just west of Hamburg, LA 1 provides connections to Marksville and Alexandria to the north, as well as the aforementioned southbound destinations.

=== Route classification and data ===
LA 114 is an undivided two-lane highway for its entire length. The route is classified by the Louisiana Department of Transportation and Development (La DOTD) as a rural major collector west of Mansura, an urban collector through town, and a rural local road east of town. Daily traffic volume in 2013 generally averaged between 1,870 and 3,500 vehicles over the course of the route. The posted speed limit is 55 mph (90 km/h) in rural areas, reduced to 25 or 30 mph (40 or 50 km/h) through populated sections.

The eastern portion of LA 114, running from LA 29 at Long Bridge and LA 1 near Hamburg, is part of the Louisiana Colonial Trails in the state-designated system of tourist routes known as the Louisiana Scenic Byways.

== History ==
In the original Louisiana Highway system in use prior to 1955, the modern LA 114 was divided among several routes, including State Route 72 from the western terminus near Echo to Mansura; State Route 299 from Mansura to Long Bridge; and State Route 30 from Long Bridge to the eastern terminus near Hamburg. Routes 30 and 72 were two of the original 98 state highways designated in 1921. They were the main routes connecting central Avoyelles Parish with the major population centers of Baton Rouge and Alexandria, respectively. In 1928, Route 299 was created by an act of the state legislature, establishing a connection between Routes 30 and 72.

These highway portions were joined together under the single designation of LA 114 when the Louisiana Department of Highways renumbered the state highway system in 1955.

La 114—From a junction with La 1 at or near Echo through or near Hessmer to a junction with La 107 at or near Mansura.

— 1955 legislative route description

As the above description indicates, LA 114 originally extended east only as far as LA 107 in Mansura. At the time, LA 1 entered Mansura from the north co-signed with LA 107 and proceeded along what is now LA 114 through Moreauville to Hamburg. In 1965, LA 1 was moved onto a new, straighter alignment along the south side of the Kansas City Southern railroad tracks from Simmesport to LA 1186 east of Mansura, bypassing the Moreauville town center. LA 114 was then extended to cover the old route, establishing its present terminus at LA 1 near Hamburg. LA 1 utilized LA 1186 as a temporary connector and was co-signed with LA 114 for a short distance in Mansura until the new alignment was extended north to Marksville in 1972. The route of LA 114 has otherwise remained the same since the 1955 Louisiana Highway renumbering.

== Future ==
La DOTD is currently engaged in a program that aims to transfer about 5,000 miles (8,000 km) of state-owned roadways to local governments over the next several years. Under this plan of "right-sizing" the state highway system, the entirety of LA 114 east of Mansura is proposed for deletion as it no longer meets a significant interurban travel function.

== Major intersections ==
The entire highway is in Avoyelles Parish.

Location	mi	km	Destinations	Notes
	0.000	0.000	LA 1 – Marksville, Alexandria	Western terminus
	5.137	8.267	LA 1188 east	Western terminus of LA 1188
Hessmer	7.528	12.115	LA 115 north (Main Street) – Marksville	Western end of LA 115 concurrency
Hessmer	7.845	12.625	LA 115 south (Main Street) – Bunkie	Eastern end of LA 115 concurrency
	10.661	17.157	LA 1187	Western terminus of LA 1187
Mansura	11.650	18.749	LA 1187	Eastern terminus of LA 1187
Mansura	12.249	19.713	LA 107 south (Valley Street) – Cottonport	Western end of LA 107 concurrency
Mansura	12.361	19.893	LA 107 north (L'Eglise Street) – Marksville	Eastern end of LA 107 concurrency
Mansura	13.032	20.973	LA 1186 to LA 1 south – Simmesport, Baton Rouge	Western terminus of LA 1186
	14.630	23.545	LA 1185	Eastern terminus of LA 1185
Long Bridge	15.508	24.958	LA 29 south – Cottonport, Bunkie	Northern terminus of LA 29
Moreauville	18.504– 18.533	29.779– 29.826	LA 451 south (Bayou Des Glaise Street)	Northern terminus of LA 451
	20.857	33.566	LA 1 – Simmesport, Marksville LA 451 north – Hamburg	Eastern terminus of LA 114; southern terminus of LA 451
1.000 mi = 1.609 km; 1.000 km = 0.621 mi: Concurrency terminus
