= Louisiana Highway 107 =

State highway in Louisiana, United States

Louisiana Highway 107

Route information
- Maintained by Louisiana DOTD
- Length: 65.0 mi (104.6 km)
- Existed: 1955 renumbering–present

Major junctions
- South end: US 71 in Morrow
- LA 29 in Cottonport; LA 114 in Mansura; LA 1 in Marksville
- North end: LA 1250 in Pineville

Location
- Country: United States
- State: Louisiana
- Parishes: St. Landry, Avoyelles, Rapides

Highway system
- Louisiana State Highway System; Interstate; US; State; Scenic
← LA 106	→ LA 108

Louisiana Highway 107 (LA 107) is a state highway located in central Louisiana that runs 65.0 miles (104.6 km) in a north–south direction from U.S. Highway 71 (US 71) in Morrow to a junction with LA 1250 in Pineville at the Pineville Expressway (US 167/LA 28). Along the way, LA 107 services Cottonport, Mansura, and Marksville, intersecting routes such as LA 29, LA 114, and LA 1. LA 107 has significant concurrencies with both LA 1 and LA 115 in the vicinity of Marksville.

== Route description ==
=== Morrow to Marksville ===
From the south, LA 107 begins at an intersection with US 71 about midway between Bunkie and Lebeau. It proceeds east, immediately crossing the Union Pacific Railroad (UPRR) tracks, and makes a zigzag through the tiny community of Morrow. Leaving Morrow, LA 107 continues eastward along Dry Bayou for about 4.6 miles (7.4 km) to a point known as Big Cane. Here it intersects LA 361 and turns north to follow that highway briefly before resuming its eastward course. After 2.7 miles (4.3 km), LA 107 turns north and crosses from St. Landry Parish into Avoyelles Parish.

In Avoyelles Parish, LA 107 continues north to a point known as Dupont where it curves to the east and intersects LA 1179. Shortly afterward, it curves back to the north at LA 1180 and heads into Plaucheville. At the town's main junction, LA 107 intersects LA 1181 and turns to the west along Bayou Choupique. LA 107 passes through a point known as Hickory where it once again intersects LA 1179 then curves to the north toward Cottonport. LA 107 enters Cottonport on Choupique Lane where it makes a zigzag to the west and back to the north. It then makes a second zigzag west onto Lemoine Street and north onto Cottonport Avenue. Here it intersects LA 362 which heads south toward Evergreen. LA 107 continues north to Bayou Rouge where it intersects LA 29 (Front Street) which also heads to Evergreen. LA 107 turns northeast onto Front Street and begins a brief concurrency with LA 29 along the bayou until the two separate at Long Bridge Road. Here LA 29 heads northeast toward Moreauville while LA 107 continues north toward Mansura. Just north of the Cottonport city limit at Bayou Du Lac, LA 107 intersects LA 1185 which parallels LA 29 to the northeast.

LA 107 enters Mansura on Valley Street and intersects LA 114, which heads west to Hessmer. LA 107 turns east at this intersection, running concurrent with LA 104 for one block along Baton Rouge Avenue to Leglise Street. Here LA 114 turns south toward Moreauville while LA 107 resumes a northerly course through Mansura, intersecting LA 1 near the town limit. LA 1 heads south through Simmesport and New Roads on the way to Baton Rouge, the state capital. After crossing LA 1, LA 107 runs parallel with it for 2.3 miles (3.7 km) to Cocoville before the two join in a northward concurrency toward Marksville.

=== Marksville to Pineville ===
In Marksville, LA 1 and LA 107 intersect LA 452 (South Preston Street), which heads north to the Red River, and LA 1189 (Acton Road), a short connector to LA 115 south. In the center of town, LA 1 and LA 107 intersect Main Street. At this four-way intersection, LA 1 continues north toward Alexandria; LA 115 heads south through Hessmer to Bunkie; and LA 107 turns northeast onto Main Street beginning a concurrency with LA 115 out of Marksville. On the north side of town, LA 107 and LA 115 intersect two minor routes, LA 1190 (Spring Bayou Road) and LA 1192. Continuing northwest, LA 107 and LA 115 intersect two minor routes that run west to connect with LA 1: LA 1191 and another section of LA 1192. LA 107 and LA 115 have a very brief concurrency with LA 1192, which splits to the northeast and loops through Fort De Russy back to the first intersection in Marksville. LA 107 and LA 115 encounter two further minor routes before reaching the Red River: LA 1193 and LA 453 which run through an area known as Hickory Hill. LA 107 and LA 115 continue northwest across the Red River, slightly bypassing the small community of Moncla to the north. On the other side of the bridge, LA 107 and LA 115 intersect LA 1196 and LA 454, which parallel the Red River, in an area known as Effie. Just north of Effie, LA 115 splits to the north and runs toward Deville and Buckeye. Meanwhile, LA 107 curves to the west through Center Point and out of Avoyelles Parish.

After crossing into Rapides Parish, LA 107 intersects LA 454 again in Cedar Grove. From this junction, LA 107 (also known in these parts as Old Marksville Highway) takes a northwest course through Kolin to Shady Oaks. Here LA 107 intersects LA 3128 which services a paper mill just to the south and connects to LA 28 on the north. After about 3.8 miles (6.1 km), LA 107 enters Pineville and reaches its northern terminus at LA 1250, the service roads of the Pineville Expressway (US 167/LA 28). Ramps from the service roads provide access to the expressway, which continues southwest into Alexandria and northeast out of Pineville, where US 167 and LA 28 separate and head toward Winnfield and Jonesville, respectively. LA 1250 heads southwest a short distance, connecting LA 107 and the Pineville Expressway with the Pineville Business District.

LA 107 is an undivided, two-lane highway for most of its length. It widens to accommodate a center lane from LA 1 in Cocoville to LA 452 in Marksville, then widens to four lanes for the short distance to LA 115. LA 107 resumes its two-lane capacity from there to Pinegrove Drive (former LA 3263) in Pineville. Here it widens again to four lanes and remains in that capacity for the remainder of its route.

== History ==
In the original Louisiana Highway system in use between 1921 and 1955, the modern LA 107 made up parts of several routes, including State Route 92 from the southern terminus at Morrow to Cottonport; State Route C-1472 from Cottonport to Mansura; State Route C-1471 from Mansura to Marksville; State Route 5 from Marksville to the second junction with the modern LA 1192 south of Moncla; State Route 57 from there to Effie; and State Route 57-D from Effie to the northern terminus in Pineville.

LA 107 was created with the 1955 Louisiana Highway renumbering, and its route has seen several minor changes, most significantly in Marksville and at the northern terminus in Pineville.

In Marksville, the original route of LA 107 (then as now co-signed with LA 1) curved northeast onto South Preston Street then turned northwest onto East Mark Street, rejoining the current alignment at South Main Street. Improvements to LA 1 during the early 1970s created a more direct alignment through Marksville, and LA 107 was re-routed to follow the portion between South Preston Street and South Main Street, eliminating a zigzag. (LA 452 was extended south along South Preston Street to cover most of the old alignment.) These improvements also included the current alignment of LA 1 between Mansura and Cocoville. In this case, however, LA 107 remains on the original route which formerly carried both highways.

In Pineville, before the construction of the Pineville Expressway, LA 107 originally followed Melrose Street across the present expressway right-of-way then turned northwest onto Reagan Street to a terminus at US 165 Business (Main Street). In March 1963, the Pineville Expressway, temporarily designated as LA 3026, was opened northward as far as Shamrock Street. LA 107 now followed Melrose Street past Reagan Street and turned northwest onto Shamrock Street to reach US 165 Business (Main Street). In May 1966, the second stage of the Pineville Expressway was opened from Shamrock Street north to Donohue Ferry Road (LA 3100 Spur), largely becoming the new route of LA 28. With Melrose Street now discontinuous, LA 107 turned southwest along the expressway service roads from its present terminus to Wadley Street. It then turned northwest onto Wadley Street, southwest onto the continuation of Melrose Street, and northwest onto Shamrock Street to reach US 165 Business (Main Street). In 2001, this alignment became a separate route, the newly designated LA 1250, and LA 107 was truncated to its present terminus.

Other improvements caused further minor alterations in the route, including the smoothing of both a zigzag south of Dupont and a curve at Shady Oaks, and a change of connector road in Morrow. In March 2000, the current bridge over the Red River at Moncla - the third constructed at this location - was opened on the southwest side of the previous bridge, which was then demolished, necessitating a slight realignment of LA 107 (and concurrent LA 115) on the approaches. In all of the above cases, remnants of the original route still exist as local roads.

== Major intersections ==
Parish	Location	mi	km	Destinations	Notes
St. Landry	Morrow	0.0	0.0	US 71 – Lebeau, Bunkie	Southern terminus
St. Landry	Big Cane	5.2	8.4	LA 361 south – Lebeau	South end of LA 361 concurrency
St. Landry		5.9	9.5	LA 361 north – Evergreen	North end of LA 361 concurrency
Avoyelles	Dupont	15.4	24.8	LA 1179 – Bodoc	Eastern terminus of LA 1179
Avoyelles		17.3	27.8	LA 1180 – Bodoc	Northern terminus of LA 1180
Avoyelles	Plaucheville	19.7	31.7	LA 1181 south	Northern terminus of LA 1181
Avoyelles	Hickory	22.3	35.9	LA 1179	Western terminus of LA 1179
Avoyelles	Cottonport	25.7	41.4	LA 362 (Cottonport Avenue)	Northern terminus of LA 362
Avoyelles	Cottonport	26.1	42.0	LA 29 south (Front Street) – Evergreen, Bunkie	South end of LA 29 concurrency
Avoyelles	Cottonport	26.7	43.0	LA 29 north (Long Bridge Road) – Moreauville	North end of LA 29 concurrency
Avoyelles		27.7	44.6	LA 1185	Southern terminus of LA 1185
Avoyelles	Mansura	31.1	50.1	LA 114 west (Baton Rouge Avenue) – Hessmer	South end of LA 114 concurrency
Avoyelles	Mansura	31.2	50.2	LA 114 east (Leglise Street) – Moreauville	North end of LA 114 concurrency
Avoyelles	Mansura	32.4	52.1	LA 1 – Simmesport, Baton Rouge, Marksville, Alexandria	
Avoyelles	Mansura	34.6	55.7	LA 1 south – Simmesport, Baton Rouge	South end of LA 1 concurrency
Avoyelles	Marksville	35.9	57.8	LA 452 (South Preston Street)	Southern terminus of LA 452
Avoyelles	Marksville	36.0	57.9	LA 1189 (Acton Road)	
Avoyelles	Marksville	36.6	58.9	LA 1 north (Tunica Drive West) / LA 115 south (South Main Street) – Alexandria, Hessmer, Bunkie	North end of LA 1 concurrency; south end of LA 115 concurrency
Avoyelles	Marksville	37.6	60.5	LA 1190 (Spring Bayou Road)	Western terminus of LA 1190
Avoyelles	Marksville	38.0	61.2	LA 1192	Eastern terminus of LA 1192
Avoyelles		39.3	63.2	LA 1191	Eastern terminus of LA 1191
Avoyelles		39.9	64.2	LA 1192 west	South end of LA 1192 concurrency
Avoyelles		40.0	64.4	LA 1192 east	North end of LA 1192 concurrency
Avoyelles		41.4	66.6	LA 1193	Eastern terminus of LA 1193
Avoyelles		43.0	69.2	LA 453 – Hickory Hill	Northern terminus of LA 453
Avoyelles		44.5	71.6	Bridge over Red River	
Avoyelles		45.2	72.7	LA 1196 – Dunlap	Western terminus of LA 1196
Avoyelles	Effie	45.6	73.4	LA 454	Eastern terminus of LA 454
Avoyelles		46.8	75.3	LA 115 north (Effie Highway) – Deville, Buckeye	North end of LA 115 concurrency
Rapides	Cedar Grove	54.4	87.5	LA 454	Western terminus of LA 454
Rapides	Shady Oaks	60.2	96.9	LA 3128 (Lig Drive) – Jonesville, Paper Mill	
Rapides	Pineville	65.0	104.6	LA 1250 – Pineville Business District, Alexandria	Northern terminus; US 167/LA 28 (Pineville Expressway) service roads
1.000 mi = 1.609 km; 1.000 km = 0.621 mi: Concurrency terminus
