= Louisiana Highway 29 =

State highway in Louisiana, United States

Louisiana Highway 29

- Route of LA 29 highlighted in red

Route information
- Maintained by Louisiana DOTD
- Length: 54.087 mi (87.045 km)
- Existed: 1955 renumbering–present
- Tourist routes: Louisiana Scenic Byways: Zydeco Cajun Prairie Byway, Northup Trail, Louisiana Colonial Trails

Major junctions
- South end: LA 13 north of Eunice
- US 167 in Ville Platte; I-49 northeast of Ville Platte; LA 182 in Whiteville; US 71 in Bunkie
- North end: LA 114 west of Moreauville

Location
- Country: United States
- State: Louisiana
- Parishes: St. Landry, Evangeline, Avoyelles

Highway system
- Louisiana State Highway System; Interstate; US; State; Scenic
← LA 28	→ LA 30

Louisiana Highway 29 (LA 29) is a state highway located in southern Louisiana. It runs 54.09 miles (87.05 km) in a north–south direction from LA 13 north of Eunice to LA 114 west of Moreauville.

The route connects Eunice, a city in western St. Landry Parish, with Ville Platte, the seat of neighboring Evangeline Parish. Here, LA 29 briefly overlaps U.S. Highway 167 (US 167) and LA 10 through the center of town. North of Ville Platte, LA 29 crosses Interstate 49 (I-49) and parallels that highway toward Bunkie. It then passes through a string of small rural towns, such as Evergreen and Cottonport, connecting the US 71 and LA 1 corridors in Avoyelles Parish.

LA 29 was designated in the 1955 Louisiana Highway renumbering, replacing portions of four former routes. These included State Route 119, State Route 224, State Route 5, and State Route 30. The portion of LA 29 between Cottonport and Long Bridge is scheduled to be eliminated from the state highway system in the future as part of the Louisiana Department of Transportation and Development (La DOTD) Road Transfer Program.

== Route description ==
=== Eunice to Ville Platte ===
From the south, LA 29 begins at a junction with LA 13 just north of the Eunice city limits in extreme western St. Landry Parish. It heads northeast as an undivided two-lane highway, and the surroundings quickly change from residential to rural farmland. After crossing into Evangeline Parish, LA 29 turns due east through the village of Chataignier and overlaps LA 95 along Vine Street. LA 29 resumes its northward course when LA 95 turns off to the south onto St. Julien Road. LA 1165 laterals off of the highway with signs directing motorists toward the nearby city of Opelousas. Passing near an area known as Point Blue, LA 29 has a brief concurrency with LA 104, which travels between Mamou to the west and Opelousas to the east.

LA 29 enters the city limits of Ville Platte, the parish seat, just north of LA 1161 (Pine Point Road). The route follows South Chataignier Street to a junction with US 167/LA 10 at the edge of the business section. US 167 and LA 10 follow the one-way pair of Main and LaSalle Streets through town. LA 29 jogs eastward onto East Main Street for two blocks, overlapping the above highways, and thus becomes a divided four-lane highway briefly. Southbound LA 29 traffic follows East LaSalle and North Chataignier Streets during this stretch.

=== Ville Platte to Avoyelles Parish ===
LA 29 heads out of Ville Platte after turning north onto Tate Cove Road. Just beyond the city limits, the route zigzags onto a parallel road running east of Tate Cove and crosses back into St. Landry Parish about five miles (8.0 km) later. Immediately across the parish line, LA 29 passes through a diamond interchange with I-49 at exit 40, connecting with Opelousas and Alexandria. The highway turns northwest at a T-intersection with LA 182 near Whiteville and proceeds into Avoyelles Parish.

LA 29 parallels the interstate northward for a few miles before entering the city of Bunkie. During this stretch, the highway crosses the serpentine Bayou Boeuf several times and intersects LA 106, a connection to I-49. Upon entering Bunkie, LA 29 follows Pershing Avenue to the center of town and a junction with US 71 (Southwest Main Street). LA 29 turns northwest to follow US 71 for three blocks before turning northeast briefly onto East Church Street and across the Union Pacific Railroad (UP) tracks concurrent with LA 115. The combined route then branches eastward onto Evergreen Street and passes the local hospital and high school complexes on the way out of Bunkie. After LA 115 departs to the north toward Hessmer and Marksville, LA 29 continues through the small town of Evergreen.

The highway assumes a winding path along several bayous for the remainder of its journey. Traveling along Front Street through the town of Cottonport, LA 29 takes on the character of a scenic route as it hugs a sharp bend in Bayou Rouge. Beginning at Cottonport Avenue, the route also overlaps LA 107, another connection to Marksville as well as nearby Mansura. After branching eastward from LA 107, LA 29 proceeds into the incorporated community of Long Bridge and reaches its northern terminus at a junction with LA 114 west of Moreauville. LA 114 provides connections to LA 1, the main highway through the area.

=== Route classification and data ===
LA 29 has several different classifications over the course of its route, as determined by the Louisiana Department of Transportation and Development (La DOTD). Most of the route between Eunice and Bunkie is classified as a rural major collector, with the remainder diminishing in importance from a rural minor arterial to a rural minor collector. The short concurrency with US 167/LA 10 in Ville Platte is classified as an urban principal arterial. Daily traffic volume in 2013 peaked at 17,100 vehicles in Ville Platte and 8,400 in Bunkie. Most of the route averaged less than 5,000 vehicles per day, with a low of 880 reported south of Bunkie. The posted speed limit is generally 55 mph (90 km/h), reduced as low as 30 or 35 mph (50 or 55 km/h) within the two cities.

Three portions of LA 29 are included in state-designated system of tourist routes known as the Louisiana Scenic Byways. The first two are short sections south of Chataignier and Bunkie that are part of the Zydeco Cajun Prairie Byway and Northup Trail, respectively. The third extends from Bunkie to the northern terminus near Moreauville and is part of the Louisiana Colonial Trails byway.

== History ==
In the original Louisiana Highway system in use between 1921 and 1955, the modern LA 29 was part of four different routes: State Route 119 from Eunice to Ville Platte; State Route 224 to Whiteville; State Route 5 to Bunkie; and State Route 30 to Long Bridge. These highways were joined under the single designation of LA 29 when the Louisiana Department of Highways renumbered the state highway system in 1955.

Class "A": La 29—From a junction with La 13 at or near Eunice through or near Chataignier to a junction with La-US 167 at or near Ville Platte.
Class "B": La 29—From a junction with La-US 167 at or near Ville Platte through or near Whiteville, Bunkie and Cottonport to a junction with La 1 at or near Long Bridge.

— 1955 legislative route description

With the 1955 renumbering, the state highway department initially categorized all routes into three classes: "A" (primary), "B" (secondary), and "C" (farm-to-market). This system has since been updated and replaced by a more specific functional classification system.

As the above description indicates, the northern terminus at Long Bridge was originally a junction with LA 1. In the mid-1960s, however, LA 1 was moved onto a new and straighter alignment through the area, and LA 114 was extended over the old route. Small improvements have also been made to the alignment of LA 29 over the years. In the early 1960s, a short section of the highway closely following the Texas and Pacific Railway (now the Acadiana Railway) was bypassed. This eliminated a sharp turn across the rail line and allowed the highway to cross at a safer angle. During the early 1970s, both LA 13 and LA 29 were straightened heading north from Eunice. The junction of the two routes was originally located at the intersection of 2nd Street and Camelia Avenue. LA 29 traveled north on 2nd Street, east on Dean Avenue, and north on Threatt Street to join the current alignment. (Note: At the time, 2nd Street was the main north–south thoroughfare in Eunice. The through route was shifted east one block to 1st Avenue, which has since been re-named as C. C. Duson Street.) Finally, the highway was re-routed north of Ville Platte around 1988. The original route traveled north on what is now LA 1171 to Tate Cove and turned southeast on LA 3247. LA 29 was simply re-signed to follow what was then LA 363 east and LA 1170 north, creating a somewhat more direct routing. (Note: This small change caused the shortening of LA 363 and LA 1171, the elimination of LA 1170, and the creation of LA 3247. As of 2016, signs are still present on the former route directing traffic to I-49 and the control cities of Ville Platte and Bunkie.)

== Future ==
La DOTD is currently engaged in a program that aims to transfer about 5,000 miles (8,000 km) of state-owned roadways to local governments over the next several years. Under this plan of "right-sizing" the state highway system, the portion of LA 29 between Cottonport and Long Bridge is proposed for deletion as it no longer meets a significant interurban travel function.

== Major intersections ==
Parish	Location	mi	km	Destinations	Notes
St. Landry		0.000	0.000	LA 13 – Eunice, Mamou	Southern terminus; 0.2 miles (0.32 km) north of Eunice
Evangeline		5.430	8.739	LA 758 Spur (Woodstone Road)	Western terminus of LA 758 Spur (signed as LA 758)
Evangeline		5.938	9.556	LA 1162 (Choupique Road)	Eastern terminus of LA 1162
Evangeline	Chataignier	7.383	11.882	LA 95 north (Vine Street) – Mamou; LA 1174 (First Street)	South end of LA 95 concurrency; western terminus of LA 1174
Evangeline	Chataignier	7.532	12.122	LA 1174 (Main Street)	Eastern terminus of LA 1174
Evangeline	Chataignier	7.659	12.326	LA 1163 (Church Street)	Southern terminus of LA 1163
Evangeline	Chataignier	8.376	13.480	LA 95 south (St. Julien Road) – Church Point	North end of LA 95 concurrency
Evangeline		8.831	14.212	LA 1165 (L'Anse Aux Pailles Road) – Opelousas	Western terminus of LA 1165
Evangeline		11.258	18.118	LA 1164 (Regal Road)	Eastern terminus of LA 1164
Evangeline		12.040	19.377	LA 104 east (Prairie Ronde Road) – Opelousas	South end of LA 104 concurrency
Evangeline		12.391	19.941	LA 104 west (L'Anse Bleu Road) – Mamou	North end of LA 104 concurrency
Evangeline		15.972	25.704	LA 1161 (Pine Point Road)	Eastern terminus of LA 1161
Evangeline	Ville Platte	16.994	27.349	US 167 north / LA 10 west (East Main Street) – Alexandria LA 29 Spur (North Chataignier Street)	South end of US 167/LA 10 concurrency; southern terminus of LA 29 Spur (signed as LA 29)
Evangeline	Ville Platte	17.384– 17.513	27.977– 28.184	US 167 south / LA 10 east (East LaSalle Street) – Opelousas, Lafayette	North end of US 167/LA 10 concurrency
Evangeline		18.475	29.733	LA 1171 (Tate Cove Road) – Tate Cove	Southern terminus of LA 1171
Evangeline		19.859	31.960	LA 363 (Faubourg Road)	Western terminus of LA 363
Evangeline		21.818	35.113	LA 3247 (Cabot Road)	Eastern terminus of LA 3247
St. Landry		26.134– 26.285	42.059– 42.302	I-49 – Opelousas, Alexandria	Exit 40 on I-49
St. Landry		27.030	43.501	LA 182 – Washington	Northwestern terminus of LA 182
Avoyelles		32.163	51.761	LA 1175 – Gold Dust	Western terminus of LA 1175
Avoyelles		32.888– 32.939	52.928– 53.010	LA 106 west to I-49 – St. Landry	Eastern terminus of LA 106
Avoyelles		35.670	57.405	LA 1176	
Avoyelles	Bunkie	39.281	63.217	US 71 south (Southwest Main Street)	South end of US 71 concurrency
Avoyelles	Bunkie	39.491	63.555	US 71 north (Southwest Main Street) LA 115 south (West Church Street) to I-49	North end of US 71 concurrency; south end of LA 115 concurrency
Avoyelles		41.801	67.272	LA 115 north – Hessmer, Marksville	North end of LA 115 concurrency
Avoyelles	Evergreen	44.058	70.904	LA 1178 south (Burns Road)	Northern terminus of LA 1178
Avoyelles	Evergreen	44.099	70.970	LA 361 south (Hill Street)	Northern terminus of LA 361
Avoyelles		47.522	76.479	LA 1184	Western terminus of LA 1184
Avoyelles		48.211	77.588	LA 1184	Eastern terminus of LA 1184
Avoyelles	Cottonport	49.663	79.925	LA 107 south (Cottonport Avenue)	South end of LA 107 concurrency
Avoyelles	Cottonport	50.276– 50.322	80.911– 80.985	LA 107 north (Front Street) – Mansura, Marksville	North end of LA 107 concurrency
Avoyelles	Long Bridge	54.087	87.045	LA 114 – Moreauville, Mansura	Northern terminus
1.000 mi = 1.609 km; 1.000 km = 0.621 mi: Concurrency terminus

== Spur route ==
Louisiana Highway 29 Spur
- Location: Ville Platte
- Length: 0.197 mi (317 m)
- Existed: c. 1982–present

Louisiana Highway 29 Spur (LA 29 Spur) runs 0.20 miles (0.32 km) in a north–south direction along North Chataignier Street in Ville Platte, the seat of Evangeline Parish. It is a short connector between the travel lanes of the concurrent US 167/LA 10, which follows the one-way pair of Main and LaSalle Streets through town.

The route is signed as part of mainline LA 29, as it performs that function for certain traffic movements at the westernmost intersection of LA 29 and US 167/LA 10. Its existence dates back to around 1982, when the one-way pair was put into effect, giving US 167/LA 10 a four-lane corridor through Ville Platte.

Major intersections
The entire highway is in Ville Platte, Evangeline Parish.

mi	km	Destinations	Notes
0.000	0.000	US 167 south / LA 10 east / LA 29 north (East Main Street) to I-49 – Opelousas, Lafayette LA 29 south (South Chataignier Street) – Eunice	Southern terminus
0.197	0.317	US 167 north / LA 10 west (East LaSalle Street) – Alexandria	Northern terminus
1.000 mi = 1.609 km; 1.000 km = 0.621 mi
