= Louisiana Colonial Trails =

The Louisiana Colonial Trails are a Louisiana Scenic Byway that follows several different state highways, primarily:

- LA 6 from the Texas state line to Clarence;
- LA 8 from the Texas state line to Jena;
- LA 28 from Alexandria to west of Jonesville;
- LA 29 from Bunkie to Long Bridge;
- LA 107 from Cottonport to Pineville;
- LA 115 from Marksville to northeast of Holloway;
- LA 124, LA 8, and US 425 in a loop from Jonesville to Ferriday via Sicily Island;
- LA 451 in its entirety; and
- US 84 from Clarence to the Mississippi state line at Natchez.
