= Oak Hill High School (Louisiana) =

High school in Louisiana, United States

Location
- 7362 Highway 112; Elmer, (Rapides Parish), Louisiana 71438; United States; 31.1471°N 92.7303°W

Information
- Type: Public high school
- School district: Rapides Parish School Board
- Principal: Mr. Chad Van Huis
- Staff: 47.00 (FTE)
- Enrollment: 742 (2021-22)
- Student to teacher ratio: 15.79
- Colors: Blue and white
- Mascot: Ram
- Nickname: Rams
- Website: oakhill.rpsb.us

Oak Hill High School (OHS) is a K-12 school in Elmer, Louisiana. It is part of the Rapides Parish School Board and has elementary school and high school divisions.

== Athletics ==
Oak Hill High athletics competes in the LHSAA.
