= Louisiana Highway 103 =

State highway in Louisiana, United States

Louisiana Highway 103

Route information
- Maintained by Louisiana DOTD
- Length: 39.5 mi (63.6 km)
- Existed: 1955 renumbering–present

Major junctions
- West end: US 190 west of Lawtell
- US 167 / LA 10 northwest of Plaisance; LA 10 / LA 182 in Washington; I-49 in Washington; US 190 in Port Barre
- East end: LA 31 in Leonville

Location
- Country: United States
- State: Louisiana
- Parishes: St. Landry

Highway system
- Louisiana State Highway System; Interstate; US; State; Scenic
| ← LA 102 | → LA 104 |

Louisiana Highway 103 (LA 103) is a state highway in St. Landry Parish, Louisiana, United States, that spans 39.5 miles (63.6 km) in a wide semi-circle around the north side of Opelousas. The route is not bannered but runs in an overall west–east direction from U.S. Highway 190 (US 190) near Lawtell to LA 31 in Leonville. Along the way, it passes through the towns of Washington and Port Barre.

== Route description ==
From the west, LA 103 begins at an intersection with US 190 just west of Lawtell in western St. Landry Parish. It proceeds north along the two-lane, undivided Prairie Ronde Highway and immediately crosses the Union Pacific Railroad (UPRR) tracks. Approaching the point known as Prairie Ronde, LA 103 turns to the northeast. It then intersects LA 104 which heads toward Mamou on the west and Opelousas on the east. Continuing northeast, LA 103 passes through Ledoux and crosses the Acadiana Railway (AKDN) tracks. At a point northwest of Plaisance, LA 103 intersects US 167 and LA 10 which are concurrent between Ville Platte on the west and a point between Opelousas and Washington on the east. LA 103 turns northwest to follow US 167/LA 10 briefly before resuming its northeastern course, now known as Grand Prairie Highway. Reaching Grand Prairie, LA 103 turns to the southeast, intersecting LA 363 which heads west through Faubourg and eventually toward Ville Platte. LA 103 continues through a point known as Soileau and then enters the town of Washington on West DeJean Street.

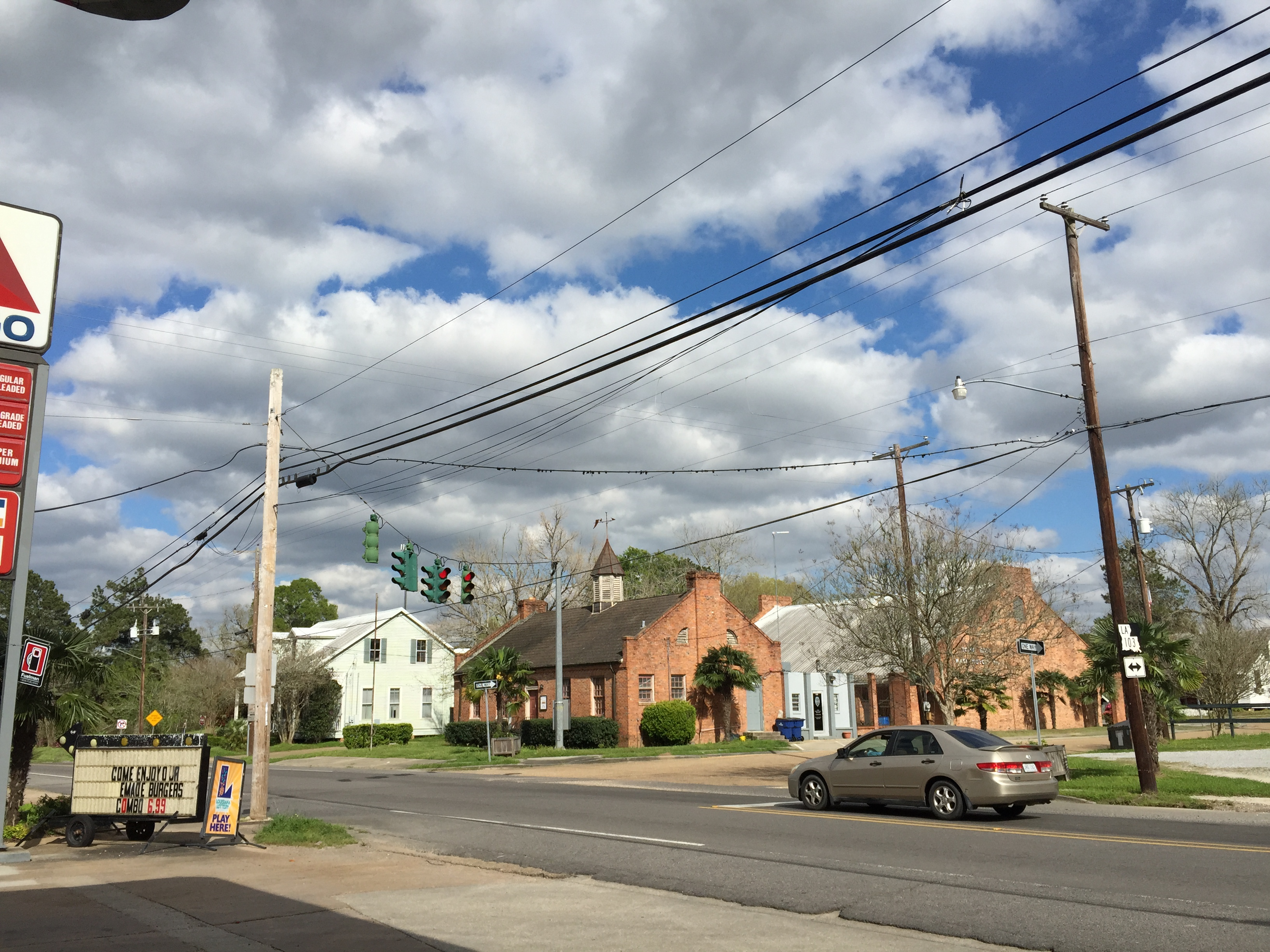
Louisiana State Route 103 in Washington, Louisiana, March 2016

In Washington, LA 103 intersects the concurrent LA 10 and LA 182 (North Main Street). Here, LA 103 widens to a divided, four-lane highway as traffic continues southeast across North Main Street onto the eastbound lanes of St. Landry Veterans Memorial Highway. (Traffic from the westbound lanes of St. Landry Veterans Memorial Highway intersects North Main Street opposite Sittig Street and, in a brief concurrency with LA 10 and LA 182, turns southwest onto North Main Street for one block to reach West DeJean Street.) After three blocks, LA 103 narrows to a four-lane, undivided highway for a short distance before dividing again through an interchange with Interstate 49 (I-49) at Exit 25. I-49 connects the town of Washington with Alexandria to the north and Opelousas to the south. After passing through the interchange, LA 103 leaves Washington and narrows again to a two-lane, undivided highway.

Just east of Washington, LA 103 crosses a bridge over Bayou Carron and intersects LA 743 which follows a parallel course along Bayou Little Teche toward Port Barre. LA 103 continues east roughly along Bayou Wauksha, crossing Bayou Courtableau and eventually intersecting with LA 359. While LA 359 continues along Bayou Wauksha as it turns northeast toward Waxia, LA 103 turns south at the intersection and heads toward Port Barre. About halfway to Port Barre, LA 103 curves to the southwest, then, upon reaching Bayou Courtableau, resumes a southerly course along the bayou into town. LA 103 enters Port Barre on Saizan Avenue, the town's main thoroughfare, and follows it as it turns southwest and crosses a bridge over Bayou Courtableau. Immediately after crossing the bayou, LA 103 intersects LA 741 (Bayou Road) which it parallels for the remainder of its route toward Leonville. LA 103 continues along Saizan Avenue and intersects US 190 on the south end of town. It then turns west, briefly running concurrent with the four-lane, divided US 190, before turning southwest along Bayou Teche. LA 103 soon crosses the UPRR tracks and exits Port Barre. After about 3.4 miles (5.5 km), LA 103 turns to the south while Church Road continues along the bayou. Cutting across a wide bend in the bayou, LA 103 curves southeast into Leonville. Upon reaching Bayou Teche once again, LA 103 arrives at its eastern terminus at an intersection with LA 31. LA 31 connects to Opelousas on the northwest and Arnaudville on the southeast.

== History ==
In the original Louisiana Highway system in use between 1921 and 1955, the modern LA 103 made up parts of several routes, including, State Route 571 from the western terminus near Lawtell to Grand Prairie; State Route 119 to Washington; State Route 487 to Bayou Saquette; State Routes 214 and 279 to Port Barre; and State Route 238 to Leonville.

LA 103 was created with the 1955 Louisiana Highway renumbering, and its route has remained unchanged except for the portion running through Washington. Before the construction of I-49 north of Opelousas in the late 1980s, LA 103 followed a slightly different two-lane alignment on the east side of Washington. Heading southeast on what was East DeJean Street (now the eastbound lanes of St. Landry Veterans Memorial Highway), LA 103 turned northeast onto North Bridge Street then southeast onto Water Street. After crossing a now-abandoned rail line, it followed the path of the current alignment briefly before turning northeast onto Elizabeth Street. LA 103 followed the now-abandoned Elizabeth Street a short distance to its dead-end at the I-49 overpass. It then continued through the present site of the overpass and rejoined the current alignment. Once I-49 was constructed, the short Elizabeth Street section by bypassed by the current four-lane alignment. Later, the St. Landry Veterans Memorial Highway was constructed to create a complete four-lane alignment between I-49 and LA 10/LA 182 (North Main Street). LA 103 was now streamlined to connect directly to what was East Sittig Street for westbound traffic and East DeJean Street for eastbound traffic.

== Major intersections ==
The entire highway is in St. Landry Parish.

| Location | mi | km | Destinations | Notes |
|---|---|---|---|---|
| | 0.0 | 0.0 | US 190 – Opelousas, Eunice | Western terminus; 1.5 miles (2.4 km) west of Lawtell |
| Prairie Ronde | 4.6 | 7.4 | LA 104 – Opelousas, Mamou | |
| | 9.8 | 15.8 | US 167 south / LA 10 east – Opelousas, Nuba | West end of US 167/LA 10 concurrency |
| | 11.2 | 18.0 | US 167 north / LA 10 west – Ville Platte | East end of US 167/LA 10 concurrency |
| Grand Prairie | 14.0 | 22.5 | LA 363 (Grand Prairie Highway) – Grand Prairie | Eastern terminus of LA 363 |
| Washington | 20.8 | 33.5 | LA 10 / LA 182 (North Main Street) – Opelousas, Lebeau | |
| Washington | 21.5 | 34.6 | I-49 – Opelousas, Alexandria | Exit 25 on I-49 |
| | 22.4 | 36.0 | LA 743 | Northern terminus of LA 743 |
| | 27.4 | 44.1 | LA 359 – Waxia | Southern terminus of LA 359 |
| Port Barre | 31.8 | 51.2 | LA 741 (Bayou Road) | Northern terminus of LA 741 |
| Port Barre | 32.8 | 52.8 | US 190 east – Baton Rouge | West end of US 190 concurrency |
| Port Barre | 33.0 | 53.1 | US 190 west – Opelousas | East end of US 190 concurrency |
| Leonville | 39.5 | 63.6 | LA 31 – Opelousas, Arnaudville | Eastern terminus |
1.000 mi = 1.609 km; 1.000 km = 0.621 mi: Concurrency terminus

== See also ==
- List of state highways in Louisiana
- List of highways numbered 103
