= Louisiana Highway 112 =

State highway in Louisiana, United States

Louisiana Highway 112

Route information
- Maintained by Louisiana DOTD
- Length: 80.9 mi (130.2 km)
- Existed: 1955 renumbering–present

Major junctions
- West end: US 171 / US 190 east of DeRidder
- LA 10 in Elizabeth; US 165 in Forest Hill; I-49 southwest of Lecompte
- East end: US 71 / US 167 in Lecompte

Location
- Country: United States
- State: Louisiana
- Parishes: Beauregard, Allen, Rapides

Highway system
- Louisiana State Highway System; Interstate; US; State; Scenic
← LA 111	→ LA 113

Louisiana Highway 112 (LA 112) is a state highway in Louisiana. It spans 80.9 miles (130.2 km) and runs from west to east. LA 112 is a mostly rural two lane highway with a maximum speed limit of 55 miles per hour (89 km/h) per hour. The western terminus is at an intersection with U.S. Route 171/U.S. Route 190 in Beauregard Parish and the eastern terminus at an intersection with US 167/US 71 in Rapides Parish. Although the highway runs west to east it meanders through three parishes and on the map appears to make a large S.

== Route description ==
Beginning at the western terminus LA 112 travels northeast and intersects with LA 113 in Sugartown, enters Allen Parish, and merges running concurrent a short distance with LA 377. LA 113 then intersects with LA 1156, and into Elizabeth, intersecting and running concurrent with LA 10 east a short distance. LA 10 splits continuing east while LA 112 turns north, enters Rapides Parish, merges with LA 113 again at Union Hill. LA 112 swings northwest then north and merges running concurrent with LA 121, intersecting LA 461, and splitting in Hineston. LA 121 continues north to intersect with LA 28 and LA 112 resumes an eastern route, passing through the community of Lisso, intersecting LA 488 then LA 1199, and passes through the communities of Elmer and Melder before intersecting and merging with U.S. 165 south into Forest Hill. LA 112 swings east then northeast, like a large check mark, before resuming an eastern route, passing through the community of Midway, and intersecting Interstate 49, before terminating in Lecompte at an intersection with U.S. 167/ U.S. 71.

== Major intersections ==
Parish	Location	mi	km	Destinations	Notes
Beauregard		0.0	0.0	US 171 / US 190 – DeRidder, Lake Charles	Western terminus
Beauregard		1.8	2.9	LA 1146	Southern terminus of LA 1146
Beauregard		10.5	16.9	LA 399 – Cravens	Southern terminus of LA 399
Beauregard	Sugartown	15.1	24.3	LA 113 – Pitkin, Reeves	
Allen		20.4	32.8	LA 377 south – Grant	West end of LA 377 concurrency
Allen		23.3	37.5	LA 377 north – Reids	East end of LA 377 concurrency
Allen	Elizabeth	30.4	48.9	LA 1156 (Main Street)	Northern terminus of LA 1156
Allen		30.8	49.6	LA 10 west – Pitkin	West end of LA 10 concurrency
Allen	Elizabeth	32.0	51.5	LA 10 east / LA 3206 – Oakdale	Northern terminus of LA 3206; east end of LA 10 concurrency
Rapides		36.1	58.1	LA 462 – Westport, Osburn	
Rapides	Union Hill	41.2	66.3	LA 113 – Glenmora, Pitkin	
Rapides		52.0	83.7	LA 121 west – Leesville	West end of LA 121 concurrency
Rapides		52.7	84.8	LA 461 – Calcasieu	Northern terminus of LA 461
Rapides	Hineston	53.4	85.9	LA 121 east – Alexandria	East end of LA 121 concurrency
Rapides		56.8	91.4	LA 488 (Twin Bridges Road) – Alexandria	Southern terminus of LA 488
Rapides	Elmer	58.1	93.5	LA 1199	Southern terminus of LA 1199
Rapides		68.1	109.6	LA 497	Northern terminus of LA 497
Rapides	Bringhurst	69.3	111.5	US 165 north – Alexandria	West end of US 165 concurrency
Rapides	Forest Hill	71.3	114.7	LA 497 north (10th Street)	West end of LA 497 concurrency
Rapides	Forest Hill	71.5	115.1	US 165 south – Oakdale	East end of US 165 concurrency
Rapides	Forest Hill	71.6	115.2	LA 497 south	East end of LA 497 concurrency
Rapides		78.1– 78.3	125.7– 126.0	I-49 – Alexandria, Opelousas	Exit 66 on I-49
Rapides	Lecompte	80.7	129.9	LA 456 (Hardy Street)	
Rapides	Lecompte	80.9	130.2	US 71 / US 167 – Alexandria, Bunkie	Eastern terminus
1.000 mi = 1.609 km; 1.000 km = 0.621 mi: Concurrency terminus
