= Bodoc =

Bodoc may refer to:

== Places ==
- Bodoc, Covasna, Romania
- Bodoc, Louisiana, United States

== People ==
- Liliana Bodoc (1958–2018), Argentine writer

== See also ==
- Bodok (disambiguation)
