= Louisiana Highway 104 =

State highway in Louisiana, United States

Louisiana Highway 104

Route information
- Maintained by Louisiana DOTD
- Length: 41.4 mi (66.6 km)
- Existed: 1955 renumbering–present

Major junctions
- West end: LA 26 southeast of Oberlin
- LA 13 in Mamou; LA 29 in Point Blue
- East end: US 190 in Opelousas

Location
- Country: United States
- State: Louisiana
- Parishes: Allen, Evangeline, St. Landry

Highway system
- Louisiana State Highway System; Interstate; US; State; Scenic
← LA 103	→ LA 105

Louisiana Highway 104 (LA 104) is a state highway located in southwestern Louisiana. It runs 41.4 miles (66.6 km) in a west–east direction from LA 26 southeast of Oberlin to U.S. Highway 190 (US 190) in Opelousas. Along the way, it passes through the town of Mamou and intersects various north–south routes that service points along US 190 such as Elton, Basile, and Eunice. East of Mamou, connections are also made to Ville Platte, the St. Landry Parish seat, on US 167/LA 10.

== Route description ==
From the west, LA 104 begins at an intersection with LA 26 at a point southeast of Oberlin known as Soileau. It proceeds east for 4.7 miles (7.6 km) before crossing from Allen Parish into Evangeline Parish.

Now known as Oberlin Road, LA 104 continues east and intersects LA 3277 (George Soileau Road), which heads south to Basile. LA 104 then heads in a general northeastern direction, zigzagging along section line roads, towards the town of Mamou. At the western limit of Mamou, LA 104 intersects LA 13 (Veterans Memorial Highway), which heads toward Alexandria on the north and Eunice on the south. LA 104 continues east onto South Street for several blocks then turns north onto 6th Street. LA 95 continues ahead on South Street before taking a southeasterly course through Chataignier on the way to US 190. Heading north along 6th Street, LA 104 passes through the business section of Mamou. At a four-way intersection near the north end of town, LA 104 turns east onto Poinciana Street; LA 1160 begins to the west; and LA 3149 (Old Highway 13) begins to the north. The latter two highways connect with the modern alignment of LA 13 which skirts the western edge of town.

LA 104 continues east on Poinciana Street out of Mamou. After 2.4 miles (3.9 km), LA 104 intersects LA 1161 (Pine Point Road), which zigzags in a general northeastern direction toward Ville Platte. After another 1.3 miles (2.1 km), LA 104 curves to the northeast briefly before taking a southeastern course toward an area known as Point Blue. About halfway along, LA 104 crosses a bridge over Bayou Des Cannes. In Point Blue, LA 104 intersects LA 1163 (Perron Road) and, shortly thereafter, LA 29 (Chataignier Road). LA 29 heads through Chataignier to US 190 on the south and to Ville Platte on the north where it connects with the concurrent US 167/LA 10. LA 104 turns south to follow LA 29 briefly before resuming a general southeastern course with several zig-zags to the south and east. East of LA 29, LA 104 intersects three minor routes: LA 1166, LA 1167 (L'Anse De Cavailer Road), and LA 1165 (L'Anse Aux Pailles Road). LA 104 crosses from Evangeline Parish into St. Landry Parish 2.8 miles (4.5 km) past the intersection with LA 1165.

In St. Landry Parish, LA 104 enters an area known as Prairie Ronde and intersects LA 103 (Prairie Ronde Highway), which connects to US 167/LA 10 on the north and a point on US 190 near Lawtell on the south. Shortly thereafter, it curves further southeast at an intersection with LA 3043. LA 3043 parallels LA 104 the remainder of the distance into Opelousas. After 2.8 miles (4.5 km), LA 104 curves to the east toward Opelousas and gradually approaches the parallel US 190. Just before reaching its eastern terminus, LA 104 once again intersects LA 3043 (Grandnigo Road) which heads north into the Opelousas Industrial Park. LA 104 ends 0.2 miles (0.32 km) later at an intersection with US 190 on the western city limit of Opelousas.

LA 104 is an undivided, two-lane highway for its entire length.

== History ==
In the original Louisiana Highway system in use between 1921 and 1955, the modern LA 104 followed State Route 120 from the western terminus to Mamou; State Route 26 through Mamou; and State Route 219 from Mamou to the eastern terminus in Opelousas.

LA 104 was created with the 1955 Louisiana Highway renumbering, and its route has remained unchanged to the present day.

== Major intersections ==
Parish	Location	mi	km	Destinations	Notes
Allen	Soileau	0.0	0.0	LA 26 – Oberlin, Elton	Western terminus
Evangeline		8.0	12.9	LA 3277 (George Soileau Road) – Basile	Northern terminus of LA 3277
Evangeline	Mamou	17.0	27.4	LA 13 (Veterans Memorial Highway) – Eunice, Alexandria	
Evangeline	Mamou	17.4	28.0	LA 95 (South Street) – Opelousas	Northern terminus of LA 95
Evangeline	Mamou	18.4	29.6	LA 1160 (Poinciana Street); LA 3149 (Old Highway 13) – Alexandria	Eastern terminus of LA 1160; southern terminus of LA 3149
Evangeline		21.7	34.9	LA 1161 (Pine Point Road) – Ville Platte	Western terminus of LA 1161
Evangeline	Point Blue	25.9	41.7	LA 1163 (Perron Road)	Northern terminus of LA 1163
Evangeline	Point Blue	26.4	42.5	LA 29 north (Chataignier Road) – Ville Platte	West end of LA 29 concurrency
Evangeline	Point Blue	26.8	43.1	LA 29 south (Chataignier Road) – Eunice, Chataignier	East end of LA 29 concurrency
Evangeline		28.1	45.2	LA 1166	Northern terminus of LA 1166
Evangeline		29.1	46.8	LA 1167 (L'Anse De Cavailer Road)	Western terminus of LA 1167
Evangeline		30.1	48.4	LA 1165 (L'Anse Aux Pailles Road) – Chataignier, Eunice	Eastern terminus of LA 1165
St. Landry	Prairie Ronde	33.9	54.6	LA 103 (Prairie Ronde Highway) – Lawtell	
St. Landry	Prairie Ronde	34.7	55.8	LA 3043	Western terminus of LA 3043
St. Landry		41.2	66.3	LA 3043 (Grandnigo Road) – Opelousas Industrial Park	Eastern terminus of LA 3043
St. Landry	Opelousas	41.4	66.6	US 190 – Opelousas, Eunice	Eastern terminus
1.000 mi = 1.609 km; 1.000 km = 0.621 mi: Concurrency terminus
