= Plaucheville, Louisiana =

- Village
- Location of Plaucheville in Avoyelles Parish, Louisiana.

- Location of Louisiana in the United States
- Coordinates: 30°57′53″N 91°59′01″W
- Country: United States
- State: Louisiana
- Parish: Avoyelles

Area
  - Total: 1.51 sq mi (3.92 km^{2})
  - Land: 1.51 sq mi (3.92 km^{2})
  - Water: 0 sq mi (0.00 km^{2})
- Elevation: 46 ft (14 m)

Population (2020)
  - Total: 221
  - Density: 145.9/sq mi (56.35/km^{2})
- Time zone: UTC-6 (CST)
  - Summer (DST): UTC-5 (CDT)
- Area code: 318
- FIPS code: 22-60985
- GNIS feature ID: 2407526
- Website: www.plaucheville.com

Plaucheville is a village in Avoyelles Parish, Louisiana, United States. As of the 2020 census, Plaucheville had a population of 221.

== Geography ==
According to the United States Census Bureau, the village has a total area of 1.5 square miles (3.9 km^{2}), all land.

== Demographics ==
Historical population
Census	Pop.	Note	%±
1910	380		—
1920	335		−11.8%
1930	356		6.3%
1940	367		3.1%
1950	277		−24.5%
1960	228		−17.7%
1970	224		−1.8%
1980	196		−12.5%
1990	187		−4.6%
2000	281		50.3%
2010	248		−11.7%
2020	221		−10.9%
2025 (est.)	208	▼	−5.9%
U.S. Decennial Census

As of the census of 2000, there were 47 people, 29 households, and 9 families residing in the village. The population density was 178 inhabitants per square mile (69/km^{2}). There were 135 housing units at an average density of 86 per square mile (33/km^{2}). The racial makeup of the village was 96.80% White, 2.14% African American, 0.71% from other races, and 0.36% from two or more races. Hispanic or Latino of any race were 0.71% of the population.

There were 129 households, out of which 24.0% had children under the age of 18 living with them, 45.0% were married couples living together, 7.8% had a female householder with no husband present, and 46.5% were non-families. 42.6% of all households were made up of individuals, and 27.1% had someone living alone who was 65 years of age or older. The average household size was 2.16 and the average family size was 3.04.

In the village, the population was spread out, with 23.8% under the age of 18, 7.5% from 18 to 24, 24.6% from 25 to 44, 21.7% from 45 to 64, and 22.4% who were 65 years of age or older. The median age was 41 years. For every 100 females, there were 84.9 males. For every 100 females age 18 and over, there were 81.4 males.

The median income for a household in the village was $32,190. Males had a median income of $27,708 versus $21,875 for females. The per capita income for the village was $35,207 (2021). About 5.7% of families and 12.1% of the population were below the poverty line, including 3.1% of those under the age of eighteen and 23.7% of those 65 or over.

== History ==
Plaucheville was first incorporated in 1803 by the three Plauché brothers, Etienne, François, and Martin Visitant, while on a rowing expedition beginning in present day Simmesport, continuing down Bayou De Glaise, Bayou Rouge in Cottonport and Bayou Choupique (Bayou Choupique was named by the brothers). The expedition ended on the intersection of Bayou Choupique and Bayou Jauques in what is now Ward 8, where the village is located. Their father, Judge Joseph Alexander Plauché, was the first resident in the village, and was Major General in the Battle of New Orleans, similar to his brother, Jean Baptiste Plauché. He also surveyed the area and the Avoyelles Parish Territory, being contracted by the United States government, naming all of the roads, with the help of Jean Baptiste.
