= Bodok =

Bodok or Bödök may refer to:

- Bodok seal, a specialised washer
- 210939 Bödök, a minor planet

== See also ==
- Bodoc (disambiguation)
