= Port Barre, Louisiana =

- Town
- Town of Port Barre
- Location of Port Barre in St. Landry Parish, Louisiana.

- Location of Louisiana in the United States
- Coordinates: 30°33′24″N 91°57′23″W
- Country: United States
- State: Louisiana
- Parish: St. Landry

Area
  - Total: 1.12 sq mi (2.89 km^{2})
  - Land: 1.08 sq mi (2.79 km^{2})
  - Water: 0.039 sq mi (0.10 km^{2})
- Elevation: 30 ft (9.1 m)

Population (2020)
  - Total: 1,751
  - Density: 1,620/sq mi (627/km^{2})
- Time zone: UTC-6 (CST)
  - Summer (DST): UTC-5 (CDT)
- ZIP code: 70577
- Area code: 337
- FIPS code: 22-61825
- FIPS code: 2407506
- Website: https://www.townofportbarre.com

Port Barre (Bear-ree) is a town in St. Landry Parish, Louisiana, United States. The town began in 1760 as an Indian trading post at the place where Bayou Teche flows out of Bayou Courtableau. As of the 2020 census, Port Barre had a population of 1,751. It is part of the Opelousas–Eunice Micropolitan Statistical Area.

== History ==
Port Barre takes its name from Alex Charles Barre (born 1746, died 1829); it was not incorporated under this name until 1898.

On December 11, 1738, the semi-nomadic Opelousas Indians petitioned the French colonial government to send traders to their district. In early 1740s, a couple of coureurs des bois set up a trading post at a landing where Bayou Courtableau and Bayou Teche meet

In 1765, Jacques Courtableau, a wealthy landowner, gave land grants to 32 Acadian immigrants. That same year, he sold Charles Barre a large parcel of land, including the site of the first trading post. The post later became known as Barre's Landing, then Port Barre. It thrived as a port town before the days of the railroads.

Guillaume Barre was born in 1642 in St. Valery, France. He emigrated, settling about 1665 in Martinique in the French West Indies. Guillaume Barre met Jean Roy (1625–1707) and Jean Hebert (1624); they traveled together to Louisiana. The Barres settled in Pointe Coupee, Louisiana, where they met the Nezat family (Pierre Nezat coming from Saint Domingue), and the Provost family (Nicolas Provost coming from Paris via Fort de Chartres, in the Illinois Country).

Alex Charles Barre is a descendant of Guillaume Barre. In 1765 he bought a large parcel of land, including the site of the first trading post, from Jacques Courtableau. Barre married Magdelaine Decuir in Pointe Coupee; they had 11 children together. Three of their children married three members of the Nezat family. Around this same time, three Nezats married three Roys, and the three families became closely entwined.

In 1820, Charles Alex Barre purchased additional acres along the bank of the bayou from Sieur Jacques Guillaume Courtableau. The Barre family operated a goods-handling business. The Barre, Nezat, and Roy families settled in this area and expanded. The settlement continued to grow through the 19th century. On July 13, 1898, the village of Port Barre was officially incorporated by Act of Proclamation of Louisiana Governor Jared Y. Sanders Sr.

== Geography ==
Port Barre is located at the confluence of Bayou Courtableau and Bayou Teche, 8 miles east of Opelousas and 52 miles west of Baton Rouge via U.S. Highway 190.

According to the United States Census Bureau, the town has a total area of 1.1 square miles (2.8 km^{2}), all land.

== Demographics ==
Historical population
Census	Pop.	Note	%±
1920	588		—
1930	674		14.6%
1940	850		26.1%
1950	1,066		25.4%
1960	1,876		76.0%
1970	2,133		13.7%
1980	2,625		23.1%
1990	2,144		−18.3%
2000	2,287		6.7%
2010	2,055		−10.1%
2020	1,751		−14.8%
2025 (est.)	1,741	▼	−0.6%
U.S. Decennial Census

=== 2020 census ===
Port Barre racial composition
Race	Number	Percentage
White (non-Hispanic)	1,137	64.93%
Black or African American (non-Hispanic)	528	30.15%
Native American	1	0.06%
Asian	3	0.17%
Other/Mixed	56	3.2%
Hispanic or Latino	26	1.48%

As of the 2020 United States census, there were 1,751 people, 680 households, and 469 families residing in the town.

=== 2010 census ===
As of the 2010 United States census, there were 2,055 people living in the town. The racial makeup of the town was 70.7% White, 25.6% Black, 0.1% Native American, 0.2% Asian and 1.8% from two or more races. 1.6% were Hispanic or Latino of any race.

=== 2000 census ===
As of the census of 2000, there were 2,287 people, 867 households, and 625 families living in the town. The population density was 2,076 inhabitants per square mile (802/km^{2}). There were 952 housing units at an average density of 864 per square mile (334/km^{2}). The racial makeup of the town was 71.88% White, 27.28% African American, 0.17% Native American, 0.17% Asian, and 0.48% from two or more races. Hispanic or Latino of any race were 0.61% of the population.

There were 867 households, out of which 36.8% had children under the age of 18 living with them, 50.9% were married couples living together, 17.1% had a female householder with no husband present, and 27.9% were non-families. 24.6% of all households were made up of individuals, and 10.8% had someone living alone who was 65 years of age or older. The average household size was 2.64 and the average family size was 3.16.

In the town, the population was spread out, with 29.8% under the age of 18, 9.6% from 18 to 24, 27.7% from 25 to 44, 20.9% from 45 to 64, and 12.1% who were 65 years of age or older. The median age was 34 years. For every 100 females, there were 93.0 males. For every 100 females age 18 and over, there were 86.8 males.

The median income for a household in the town was $23,945, and the median income for a family was $29,279. Males had a median income of $30,761 versus $19,000 for females. The per capita income for the town was $11,028. About 21.6% of families and 28.1% of the population were below the poverty line, including 37.7% of those under age 18 and 29.2% of those age 65 or over.

== Arts and culture ==
Port Barre hosts an annual "Cracklin' Festival," recognized by the state of Louisiana, on the second weekend in November. The Cracklin' Festival was started in 1986 by the Port Barre Lions Club. All proceeds from the festival are donated to underprivileged children who need glasses or eye surgery.

== Education ==
Port Barre is home to the Port Barre High School Red Devils.

== Infrastructure ==
=== Transportation ===
U.S. Route 190 is a major east–west route connecting with Baton Rouge to the east and Opelousas and Eunice to the west.
LA 103 is a state highway traveling northeast–southwest through the heart of the town, connecting with U.S. Route 190 (southeast) and extending northeast out of the corporation limits.
LA 741 is a state highway traveling northwest–southeast which connects with LA 103 (northwest) in town and extending southeast out of the corporation limits intersecting with U.S. Route 190.

== Notable person ==
- Clay Higgins, member of the United States House of Representatives for Louisiana's 3rd congressional district
