= Echo, Louisiana =

- Census-designated place
- Location within Louisiana Location within the United States
- Coordinates: 31°06′44″N 92°14′50″W
- Country: United States
- State: Louisiana
- Parish: Rapides

Area
  - Total: 1.74 sq mi (4.51 km^{2})
  - Land: 1.74 sq mi (4.51 km^{2})
  - Water: 0 sq mi (0.00 km^{2})
- Elevation: 62 ft (19 m)

Population (2020)
  - Total: 352
  - Density: 202.1/sq mi (78.04/km^{2})
- Time zone: UTC-6 (Central (CST))
  - Summer (DST): UTC-5 (CDT)
- ZIP code: 71330
- Area code: 318
- GNIS feature ID: 534761

Echo (also Bijou, Bijou Station) is an unincorporated community and census-designated place (CDP) in Rapides Parish, Louisiana, United States. It was first listed as a CDP in the 2020 census with a population of 352.

Its ZIP code is 71330.

== History ==
In 1907 a mob lynched Henry Johnson, a middle-aged Black man was taken from jail by a mob of 150 white men, who shot him around 50 times.

== Demographics ==
Historical population
Census	Pop.	Note	%±
2020	352		—
U.S. Decennial Census; 2020

Echo first appeared as a census designated place in the 2020 U.S. Census.

=== 2020 census ===
Echo CDP, Louisiana – Demographic Profile (NH = Non-Hispanic)
Race / Ethnicity	Pop 2020	% 2020
White alone (NH)	309	87.78%
Black or African American alone (NH)	16	4.55%
Native American or Alaska Native alone (NH)	0	0.00%
Asian alone (NH)	0	0.00%
Pacific Islander alone (NH)	0	0.00%
Some Other Race alone (NH)	2	0.57%
Mixed Race/Multi-Racial (NH)	20	5.68%
Hispanic or Latino (any race)	5	1.42%
Total	352	100.00%

Note: the US Census treats Hispanic/Latino as an ethnic category. This table excludes Latinos from the racial categories and assigns them to a separate category. Hispanics/Latinos can be of any race.
