= Acadiana Railway =

Overview
- Headquarters: Opelousas, Louisiana
- Reporting mark: AKDN
- Locale: Louisiana
- Dates of operation: 1990–

Technical
- Track gauge: 4 ft 8 1/2 in (1,435 mm)
- Track length: 83.1 miles owned, 5 miles leased

The Acadiana Railway Company (reporting mark AKDN) is a short line railroad based in Opelousas, Louisiana. It operates on the following trackage:

- Crowley–Eunice, 21.6 miles (34.8 km)
- by trackage rights on property of the Union Pacific Railroad, Eunice–Opelousas, 20.9 miles (33.6 km)
- Opelousas–Bunkie, Louisiana, 36.1 miles (58.1 km)
- switching tracks at Opelousas, 5 miles (8.0 km)
- per lease since September 2000, McCall–Lula (Thibodeaux Industrial Lead, owned by Union Pacific, in Donaldsonville), 5 miles (8.0 km) (Out of Service)

The Crowley-Eunice line was built by the New Orleans, Texas and Mexico Railway before 1900. The Opelousas-Eunice and Opelousas-Bunkie lines are former Missouri Pacific lines and were sold to the newly established Acadiana Railway Company in October 1990. The company started business on October 15, 1990, with the acquired trackage from Missouri Pacific and from Union Pacific. The company is controlled by Trac-Work Inc.

== Roster ==
The AKDN fleet, as of October 2019, consists of the following eight locomotives:

Number	Type	Built	Notes
701, 3018	EMD GP30	1963	
1015	EMD SW1200	1966	
1503, 1518	EMD SW1500	1969	1518 is leased from Larry's Truck and Electric.
1610, 4106, 8063	EMD GP9	1954-1957	4106 is the variant GP9RM, rebuilt by Canadian National in the 1980s. 8063 is the variant GP10, rebuilt by Illinois Central in 1970.
