= Fifth Ward, Louisiana =

- Census-designated place
- Location within the state of Louisiana
- Coordinates: 31°07′35″N 92°09′42″W
- Country: United States
- State: Louisiana
- Parishes: Avoyelles

Area
  - Total: 5.20 sq mi (13.47 km^{2})
  - Land: 5.20 sq mi (13.47 km^{2})
  - Water: 0 sq mi (0.00 km^{2})
- Elevation: 75 ft (23 m)

Population (2020)
  - Total: 921
  - Density: 177.1/sq mi (68.38/km^{2})
- Time zone: UTC-6 (Central (CST))
  - Summer (DST): UTC-5 (CST)
- ZIP code: 71351
- Area code: 318
- FIPS code: 22-25545
- GNIS feature ID: 2586678

Fifth Ward is an unincorporated community and census-designated place in Avoyelles Parish, Louisiana, United States. As of the 2020 census, Fifth Ward had a population of 921.

Fifth Ward is located along Louisiana Highway 1, 7 miles (11 km) west of Marksville, the parish seat, and 23 miles (37 km) southeast of Alexandria.

== Demographics ==
Historical population
Census	Pop.	Note	%±
2010	800		—
2020	921		15.1%
U.S. Decennial Census

Fifth Ward was first listed as a census designated place in the 2010 U.S. census.

== Attractions ==
Though this small community may seem unremarkable, it has a few attractions to offer.

- Fifth Ward Flea Market, A flea market with many vendors run inside the old Fifth Ward High School.
- Cardinal Cafe, A cafe run in the old Fifth Ward High School
- Avoyelles Parish Library - Fifth Ward Branch, A library run in the old Fifth Ward High School

== History ==
During the Great Flood of 1927, Avoyelles Parish was almost completely flooded, except for a small portion of Fifth Ward, now called "The Island" by residents of Fifth Ward.

== Education ==
Local public schools are managed by the Avoyelles Parish School Board.

According to the Zoning of Avoyelles Parish Schools, youth in Fifth Ward are zoned to attend:

- Marksville High School
- Lafargue Elementary School

Schools without zoning:

- Sacred Heart School, Moreauville
- St. Mary's School, Cottonport
- St. Joseph School, Plaucheville
- St. Anthony of Padua School, Bunkie

Magnet Schools:

- Bunkie Magnet High School
- LASAS (Louisiana School of Agricultural Science)
