= Grand Prairie, Louisiana =

Grand Prairie
- Unincorporated community
- Location within the state of Louisiana
- Coordinates: 30°41′00″N 92°08′51″W
- Country: United States
- State: Louisiana
- Parish: St. Landry
- Elevation: 59 ft (18 m)
- Time zone: UTC-6 (Central (CST))
  - Summer (DST): UTC-5 (CDT)
- GNIS feature ID: 560882

Grand Prairie is an unincorporated community in St. Landry Parish, Louisiana, United States. It is the location of two historic houses that are listed on the National Register of Historic Places: the LaFleur House and the Alexandre Fontenot fils House.

The famous St. Landry Parish Sheriff Cat Doucet was born in Grand Prairie in 1899.
