= Effie, Louisiana =

- Unincorporated community
- Location within Louisiana Location within the United States
- Coordinates: 31°12′58″N 92°09′20″W
- Country: United States
- State: Louisiana
- Parish: Avoyelles
- Elevation: 82 ft (25 m)
- Time zone: UTC-6 (Central (CST))
  - Summer (DST): UTC-5 (CDT)
- ZIP code: 71331
- Area code: 318
- GNIS feature ID: 543167

Effie is an unincorporated community in Avoyelles Parish, Louisiana, United States. The community is located on the banks of the Red River of the South near the town of Marksville. Its ZIP code is 71331.

== Education ==
Local public schools are managed by the Avoyelles Parish School Board.

== See also ==
- Brouillette, Louisiana
- Marksville, Louisiana
