= Morrow, Louisiana =

Morrow
- Census-designated place
- Location within the state of Louisiana
- Coordinates: 30°49′46″N 92°04′58″W
- Country: United States
- State: Louisiana
- Parish: St. Landry
- Elevation: 46 ft (14 m)

Population (2000)
  - Total: 149
- Time zone: UTC-6 (Central (CST))
  - Summer (DST): UTC-5 (CDT)
- ZIP codes: 71356
- Area code: 318
- GNIS feature ID: 2805370

Morrow is an unincorporated community and census-designated place (CDP) in St. Landry Parish, Louisiana, United States, located just east of U.S. Route 71. It was first listed as a CDP in the 2020 census with a population of 149.

A post office has existed in this community since 1883.

Public school students in Morrow attended Morrow Elementary School (under the supervision of the St. Landry Parish School Board) until the school was closed due to dwindling school population and a federal desegregation order in 2009.

Morrow is served by St. Landry Parish Fire Protection District #7.

== Demographics ==
Historical population
Census	Pop.	Note	%±
2020	149		—
U.S. Decennial Census; 2020

Morrow first appeared as a census designated place in the 2020 U.S. census.

=== 2020 census ===
Morrow CDP, Louisiana – Racial and ethnic composition Note: the U.S. census treats Hispanic/Latino as an ethnic category. This table excludes Latinos from the racial categories and assigns them to a separate category. Hispanics/Latinos may be of any race.
Race / Ethnicity (NH = Non-Hispanic)	Pop 2020	% 2020
White alone (NH)	22	14.77%
Black or African American alone (NH)	122	81.88%
Native American or Alaska Native alone (NH)	0	0.00%
Asian alone (NH)	2	1.34%
Native Hawaiian or Pacific Islander alone (NH)	0	0.00%
Other race alone (NH)	0	0.00%
Mixed race or Multiracial (NH)	3	2.01%
Hispanic or Latino (any race)	0	0.00%
Total	149	100.00%
