= Elmer, Louisiana =

- Unincorporated community
- Location within Louisiana Location within the United States
- Coordinates: 31°07′57″N 92°40′52″W
- Country: United States
- State: Louisiana
- Parish: Rapides
- Elevation: 187 ft (57 m)
- Time zone: UTC-6 (Central (CST))
  - Summer (DST): UTC-5 (CDT)
- ZIP code: 71424
- Area code: 318
- GNIS feature ID: 547339

Elmer is an unincorporated community in Rapides Parish, Louisiana, United States. The community is located on Louisiana Highway 112, 18.6 miles (29.9 km) southwest of Alexandria. Elmer has a post office with ZIP code 71424, which opened on May 15, 1888.
