= Chataignier, Louisiana =

- Village
- Location of Chataignier in Evangeline Parish, Louisiana.

- Location of Louisiana in the United States
- Coordinates: 30°34′11″N 92°19′01″W
- Country: United States
- State: Louisiana
- Parish: Evangeline

Area
  - Total: 0.63 sq mi (1.63 km^{2})
  - Land: 0.63 sq mi (1.63 km^{2})
  - Water: 0 sq mi (0.00 km^{2})
- Elevation: 59 ft (18 m)

Population (2020)
  - Total: 259
  - Density: 412.3/sq mi (159.19/km^{2})
- Time zone: UTC-6 (CST)
  - Summer (DST): UTC-5 (CDT)
- Area code: 337
- FIPS code: 22-14450
- GNIS feature ID: 2407429

Chataignier is a village in Evangeline Parish, Louisiana, United States. The population was 259 at the 2020 census.

== Geography ==
According to the United States Census Bureau, the village has a total area of 0.6 square miles (1.6 km^{2}), all land.

== History ==
The name Chataignier is French and means "chinquapin," a small chestnut. Chinquapins (Castanea pumila) grew abundantly in the surrounding prairie until the chestnut blight wiped them out. They are now non-existent in the Chataignier community.

Gleanings from old records indicate that Chataignier's first settler was Ursiana Manuel, who came from Mexico via New Orleans circa 1793 when Louisiana was a Spanish colony and George Washington was serving as President of the new republic known as the United States of America. Manuel's descendants are still living on the original land grant obtained during the Spanish domination of Louisiana. Other early settlers mentioned include Jacques Fontenot, Louis Redan, General Garis de Flaugeac, Artemon Lafleur, and Valentine Savoy. Savoy, incidentally, was the first man to begin the manufacture of spinning wheels in this part of the country; he operated a large plantation, a cotton gin and a saw mill.

The settlers of Chataignier have long enjoyed the benefits of religion (predominantly Catholic), education and postal service, in that order. The second oldest church in the Evangeline country was founded in Chataignier. Records show that it was first a mission of St. Landry Catholic Church in Opelousas beginning in 1856 but that in 1869 it was created as a separate parish called Our Lady of Mount Carmel. A church was built with Father Jean Baptiste Bre as its first pastor. In 1901, the then pastor Father A. L. Bacchioci moved to the new nearby village of Eunice, of which Chataignier became a mission at that time. The following year, Chataignier became an established church and separate parish for the second time and has remained so to this day.

The Chataignier community's educational background dates back to the pre-Civil War year of 1858 when the first known school, the Onezine Lafleur School, was located in the upper Chataignier community. Although the name of the teacher prior to the Civil War is unknown, it has been established that Dorsin Lafleur was appointed teacher for a short period of time during the war. The war itself eventually brought about the close of the school; however, in 1879, Mrs. P.H. Marueney was appointed to teach and the school reopened. At this time, French was the language used and taught in school. Progress continued and by 1887 Chataignier had one of the eight public schools in the parish.

The Chataignier post office was established on November 20, 1879, in what was known at that time as St. Landry Parish. In 1910, the very large area of St. Landry Parish was divided up to form several other parishes, one of which was Evangeline. Chataignier now occupies the southeastern part of that parish. The Village of Chataignier was incorporated in January 1973 with a population of 375. Old historical spots have long disappeared and all that remains are parish lines, township lines, and section lines (all used in land surveys). The economy of the area is agriculturally based.

== Demographics ==
Historical population
Census	Pop.	Note	%±
1980	431		—
1990	281		−34.8%
2000	383		36.3%
2010	364		−5.0%
2020	259		−28.8%
2025 (est.)	260	▲	0.4%
U.S. Decennial Census

Chataignier racial composition as of 2020
Race	Number	Percentage
White (non-Hispanic)	107	41.31%
Black or African American (non-Hispanic)	141	54.44%
Other/Mixed	5	1.93%
Hispanic or Latino	6	2.52%

As of the 2020 United States census, there were 259 people, 142 households, and 71 families residing in the village.

== Education ==
Public schools in Evangeline Parish are operated by the Evangeline Parish School Board. Chataignier Elementary School is located in the village of Chataignier and serves students in grades pre-kindergarten through eight.

== Notable person ==
- Sady Courville (1905–1988), Cajun fiddler
