= Bodoc, Louisiana =

Unincorporated community in Louisiana, U.S.

Coordinates: 30°55′09″N 91°59′26″W

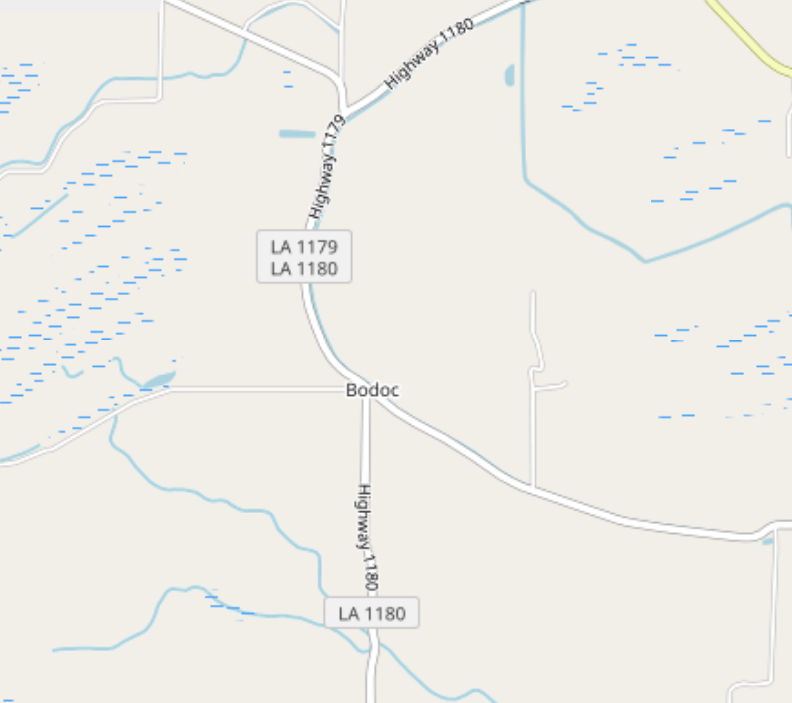
Bodoc, Louisiana

Bodoc is an unincorporated community in Avoyelles Parish, Louisiana, United States.

== Etymology ==
Bodoc was named for a type of wood.

== Education ==
Local public schools are managed by the Avoyelles Parish School Board.
