= Moreauville, Louisiana =

- Village
- Location of Moreauville in Avoyelles Parish, Louisiana.

- Location of Louisiana in the United States
- Coordinates: 31°02′09″N 91°59′35″W
- Country: United States
- State: Louisiana
- Parish: Avoyelles

Area
  - Total: 3.03 sq mi (7.84 km^{2})
  - Land: 3.03 sq mi (7.84 km^{2})
  - Water: 0 sq mi (0.00 km^{2})
- Elevation: 56 ft (17 m)

Population (2020)
  - Total: 984
  - Density: 325.1/sq mi (125.53/km^{2})
- Time zone: UTC-6 (CST)
  - Summer (DST): UTC-5 (CDT)
- Area code: 318
- FIPS code: 22-51970
- GNIS feature ID: 2407505
- Website: www.moreauville.org

Moreauville is a village in Avoyelles Parish, Louisiana, United States. As of the 2020 census, Moreauville had a population of 984.

== Geography ==
According to the United States Census Bureau, the village has a total area of 3.0 square miles (7.8 km^{2}), all land.

== Demographics ==
Historical population
Census	Pop.	Note	%±
1910	728		—
1920	867		19.1%
1930	600		−30.8%
1940	815		35.8%
1950	835		2.5%
1960	815		−2.4%
1970	807		−1.0%
1980	853		5.7%
1990	919		7.7%
2000	922		0.3%
2010	929		0.8%
2020	984		5.9%
2025 (est.)	928	▼	−5.7%
U.S. Decennial Census

Moreauville racial composition as of 2020
Race	Number	Percentage
White (non-Hispanic)	517	52.54%
Black or African American (non-Hispanic)	369	37.5%
Native American	15	1.52%
Asian	2	0.2%
Pacific Islander	1	0.1%
Other/Mixed	57	5.79%
Hispanic or Latino	23	2.34%

As of the 2020 United States census, there were 984 people, 416 households, and 255 families residing in the village.
