= Hessmer, Louisiana =

- Village
- Location of Hessmer in Avoyelles Parish, Louisiana.

- Location of Louisiana in the United States
- Coordinates: 31°03′00″N 92°07′32″W
- Country: United States
- State: Louisiana
- Parish: Avoyelles
- Incorporated: 1955

Area
  - Total: 0.83 sq mi (2.14 km^{2})
  - Land: 0.83 sq mi (2.14 km^{2})
  - Water: 0 sq mi (0.00 km^{2})
- Elevation: 75 ft (23 m)

Population (2020)
  - Total: 772
  - Density: 933.9/sq mi (360.57/km^{2})
- Time zone: UTC-6 (CST)
  - Summer (DST): UTC-5 (CDT)
- Area code: 318
- FIPS code: 22-34015
- GNIS feature ID: 2407475
- Website: www.hessmer.com

Hessmer is a village in Avoyelles Parish, Louisiana, United States. As of the 2020 census, Hessmer had a population of 772.

== History ==
The rail depot which served the area was named "Hessmer" in 1902 by William Edenborn, railroad tycoon. The village was incorporated in 1955.

== Geography ==
According to the United States Census Bureau, the village has a total area of 0.81 square miles (2.1 km^{2}), all land.

== Demographics ==
Historical population
Census	Pop.	Note	%±
1960	433		—
1970	454		4.8%
1980	743		63.7%
1990	578		−22.2%
2000	642		11.1%
2010	802		24.9%
2020	772		−3.7%
2025 (est.)	740	▼	−4.1%
U.S. Decennial Census

As of the census of 2000, there were 642 people, 280 households, and 176 families residing in the village. The population density was 855.1 inhabitants per square mile (330.2/km^{2}). There were 303 housing units at an average density of 403.6 per square mile (155.8/km^{2}). The racial makeup of the village was 91.43% White, 6.70% African American, 1.56% Native American, and 0.31% from two or more races. Hispanic or Latino of any race were 0.16% of the population.

There were 280 households, out of which 27.9% had children under the age of 18 living with them, 50.7% were married couples living together, 8.6% had a female householder with no husband present, and 37.1% were non-families. 32.9% of all households were made up of individuals, and 14.6% had someone living alone who was 65 years of age or older. The average household size was 2.29 and the average family size was 2.90.

In the village, the population was spread out, with 23.8% under the age of 18, 9.7% from 18 to 24, 30.2% from 25 to 44, 22.3% from 45 to 64, and 14.0% who were 65 years of age or older. The median age was 35 years. For every 100 females, there were 94.5 males. For every 100 females age 18 and over, there were 85.2 males.

The median income for a household in the village was $24,659, and the median income for a family was $31,528. Males had a median income of $23,750 versus $16,964 for females. The per capita income for the village was $12,449. About 15.3% of families and 18.6% of the population were below the poverty line, including 16.1% of those under age 18 and 20.0% of those age 65 or over.
