= Mansura, Louisiana =

- Town
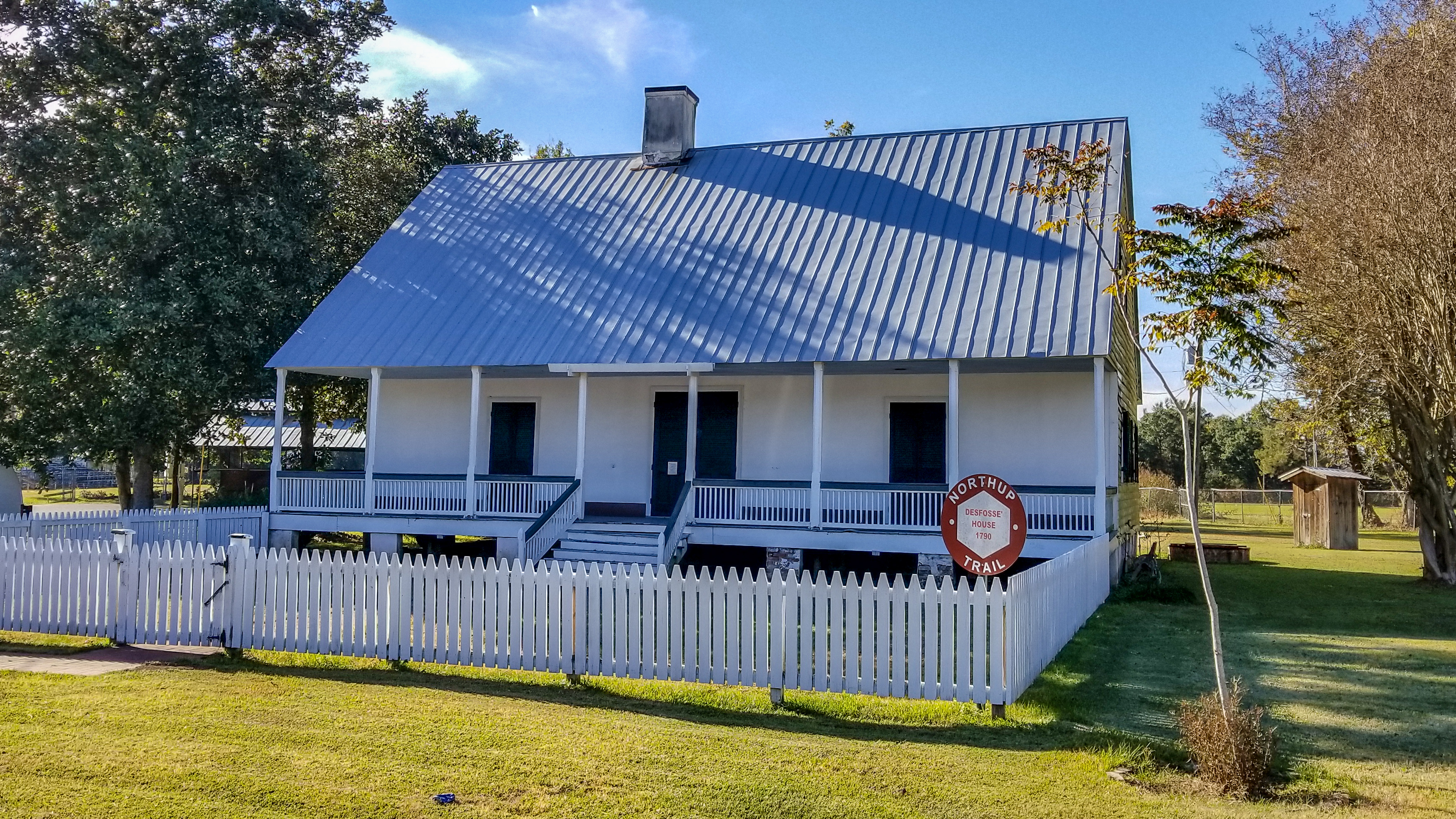
- The Desfossé House dates to 1790.

- Location of Mansura in Avoyelles Parish, Louisiana.

- Location of Louisiana in the United States
- Coordinates: 31°04′02″N 92°03′10″W
- Country: United States
- State: Louisiana
- Parish: Avoyelles

Area
  - Total: 2.85 sq mi (7.39 km^{2})
  - Land: 2.85 sq mi (7.39 km^{2})
  - Water: 0 sq mi (0.00 km^{2})
- Elevation: 72 ft (22 m)

Population (2020)
  - Total: 1,320
  - Density: 462.5/sq mi (178.57/km^{2})
- Time zone: UTC-6 (CST)
  - Summer (DST): UTC-5 (CDT)
- Area code: 318
- FIPS code: 22-48400
- GNIS feature ID: 2406089
- Website: www.townofmansura.com

Mansura is a town in Avoyelles Parish, Louisiana, United States. As of the 2020 census, Mansura had a population of 1,320. Mansura is home to the Cochon de Lait Festival, and claims to be the Cochon de Lait capital of the world.

== Geography ==
According to the United States Census Bureau, the town has a total area of 2.7 square miles (7.0 km^{2}), all land.

== Demographics ==
Historical population
Census	Pop.	Note	%±
1890	144		—
1900	408		183.3%
1910	695		70.3%
1920	829		19.3%
1930	1,057		27.5%
1940	1,138		7.7%
1950	1,439		26.4%
1960	1,579		9.7%
1970	1,699		7.6%
1980	2,074		22.1%
1990	1,601		−22.8%
2000	1,573		−1.7%
2010	1,419		−9.8%
2020	1,320		−7.0%
2025 (est.)	1,260	▼	−4.5%
U.S. Decennial Census

Mansura racial composition as of 2020
Race	Number	Percentage
White (non-Hispanic)	389	29.47%
Black or African American (non-Hispanic)	809	61.29%
Native American	14	1.06%
Other/Mixed	96	7.27%
Hispanic or Latino	12	0.91%

As of the 2020 United States census, there were 1,320 people, 623 households, and 288 families residing in the town.

== Louisiana 4-H Museum ==
The city of Mansura is the home of the Louisiana 4-H Museum and Hall of Fame. Opened in 2009, this museum has a complete history of 4-H in Louisiana from 1908 to present day. The museum boasts its Camp Grant Walker's Old Dance Pavilion look of its video screen and benches looking like the Greek Theatre seating. The museum also boasts its hall of fame with over 100 inductees and at least one from all of the 64 parishes of Louisiana.

== Education ==
Local public schools are managed by the Avoyelles Parish School Board.

== Notable people ==
- Felix Moncla, U.S. Air Force pilot who disappeared in 1953.
- Vincent Simmons, serving a 100-year sentence at the Louisiana State Prison for attempted aggravated rape.
