= Simmesport, Louisiana =

- Town
- Location of Simmesport in Avoyelles Parish, Louisiana.

- Location of Louisiana in the United States
- Coordinates: 30°58′50″N 91°48′51″W
- Country: United States
- State: Louisiana
- Parish: Avoyelles

Area
  - Total: 2.37 sq mi (6.15 km^{2})
  - Land: 2.19 sq mi (5.66 km^{2})
  - Water: 0.19 sq mi (0.49 km^{2})
- Elevation: 46 ft (14 m)

Population (2020)
  - Total: 1,468
  - Density: 671.9/sq mi (259.43/km^{2})
- Time zone: UTC-6 (CST)
  - Summer (DST): UTC-5 (CDT)
- ZIP code: 71369
- Area code: 318
- FIPS code: 22-70525
- GNIS feature ID: 2407344
- Website: simmesportla.com

Simmesport is a town in Avoyelles Parish, Louisiana, United States. As of the 2020 census, Simmesport had a population of 1,468. It is the northernmost town on the Atchafalaya River, located near the Old River which connects the Red and Atchafalaya rivers with the Mississippi River.

== History ==
The town was founded by Bennet Barton Simmes (1811–1888), one-time owner of White Hall Plantation, which was located on the opposite bank of the Atchafalaya River.

In December 2005 industrialist Frank Stronach founded a new community just south of Simmesport along the Atchafalaya River levee, known as Canadaville, a place intended to house people displaced by Hurricane Katrina. Canadaville, Louisiana is no longer a community and was considered to be a failure by many. The site of the community is still there but many of the homes and structures have been moved. Many inhabitants of Canadaville now reside within the town and throughout the area.

== Geography ==
Simmesport is located in eastern Avoyelles Parish on the west bank of the Atchafalaya River.

According to the United States Census Bureau, the town has a total area of 2.4 square miles (6.1 km^{2}), of which 2.2 square miles (5.7 km^{2}) is land and 0.19 square miles (0.5 km^{2}), or 7.93%, is water.

== Demographics ==
Historical population
Census	Pop.	Note	%±
1930	638		—
1940	1,215		90.4%
1950	1,510		24.3%
1960	2,125		40.7%
1970	2,027		−4.6%
1980	2,293		13.1%
1990	2,092		−8.8%
2000	2,239		7.0%
2010	2,161		−3.5%
2020	1,468		−32.1%
2025 (est.)	1,400	▼	−4.6%
U.S. Decennial Census

Simmesport racial composition as of 2020
Race	Number	Percentage
White (non-Hispanic)	528	35.97%
Black or African American (non-Hispanic)	858	58.45%
Native American	8	0.54%
Asian	5	0.34%
Other/Mixed	49	3.33%
Hispanic or Latino	20	1.36%

As of the 2020 United States census, there were 1,468 people, 627 households, and 379 families residing in the town.

== Notable people ==
- Norma McCorvey, a.k.a. "Jane Roe", the plaintiff in Roe v. Wade, was born in Simmesport in 1947.
- Joe Simon, the soul musician, was born in Simmesport in 1943.
