= Cottonport, Louisiana =

- Town
- Location of Cottonport in Avoyelles Parish, Louisiana.

- Location of Louisiana in the United States
- Coordinates: 30°59′50″N 92°03′03″W
- Country: United States
- State: Louisiana
- Parish: Avoyelles
- Incorporated: 1888

Area
  - Total: 2.00 sq mi (5.19 km^{2})
  - Land: 2.00 sq mi (5.19 km^{2})
  - Water: 0 sq mi (0.00 km^{2})
- Elevation: 59 ft (18 m)

Population (2020)
  - Total: 2,023
  - Density: 1,008.9/sq mi (389.53/km^{2})
- Time zone: UTC-6 (CST)
  - Summer (DST): UTC-5 (CDT)
- ZIP code: 71327
- Area code: 318
- FIPS code: 22-17880
- GNIS feature ID: 2406320
- Website: www.thetownofcottonport.net

Cottonport is a town in Avoyelles Parish, Louisiana, United States. As of the 2020 census, Cottonport had a population of 2,023.

== History ==
Cottonport was founded in the early 19th century. In 1835, Joseph Ducote donated land to be used for a road and school, which was the beginnings of the community. Incorporated in 1888 along the banks of Bayou Rouge (French for "Red Bayou"). In the 19th century, large boats made their way through Cottonport with goods destined for the port of New Orleans. The bayou was deep enough to support the large boats and formed a perfect horseshoe, which allowed vessels to turn around. The boats would deliver cargo into the area and would load crops on board to take to larger ports along the route. The main crop available for exporting at that time was cotton. In fact, because so much cotton was being shipped from the port, early settlers named the village Cottonport.

=== Present day ===
Today, over a century after its incorporation, Cottonport retains many of its picturesque qualities. Although Bayou Rouge is no longer navigable, it continues to be used as a fishing hole. It also serves as the backdrop to the annual Cottonport Christmas Festival, held the second weekend in December, which celebrated its 50th anniversary in 2015.

== Geography ==
According to the United States Census Bureau, the town has a total area of 2.0 square miles (5.2 km^{2}), all land.

== Demographics ==
Historical population
Census	Pop.	Note	%±
1900	505		—
1910	866		71.5%
1920	720		−16.9%
1930	1,015		41.0%
1940	1,196		17.8%
1950	1,534		28.3%
1960	1,581		3.1%
1970	1,862		17.8%
1980	1,911		2.6%
1990	2,600		36.1%
2000	2,316		−10.9%
2010	2,006		−13.4%
2020	2,023		0.8%
2025 (est.)	1,916	▼	−5.3%
U.S. Decennial Census

=== Racial and ethnic composition ===
Cottonport town, Louisiana – Racial and ethnic composition Note: the US Census treats Hispanic/Latino as an ethnic category. This table excludes Latinos from the racial categories and assigns them to a separate category. Hispanics/Latinos may be of any race.
Race / Ethnicity (NH = Non-Hispanic)	Pop 2000	Pop 2010	Pop 2020	% 2000	% 2010	% 2020
White alone (NH)	1,107	895	707	47.80%	44.62%	34.95%
Black or African American alone (NH)	1,147	1,058	1,191	49.53%	52.74%	58.87%
Native American or Alaska Native alone (NH)	13	6	19	0.56%	0.30%	0.94%
Asian alone (NH)	4	10	7	0.17%	0.50%	0.35%
Native Hawaiian or Pacific Islander alone (NH)	0	0	1	0.00%	0.00%	0.05%
Other race alone (NH)	5	1	4	0.22%	0.05%	0.20%
Mixed race or Multiracial (NH)	16	18	56	0.69%	0.90%	2.77%
Hispanic or Latino (any race)	24	18	38	1.04%	0.90%	1.88%
Total	2,316	2,006	2,023	100.00%	100.00%	100.00%

=== 2020 census ===
As of the 2020 census, Cottonport had a population of 2,023. The median age was 34.4 years. 31.3% of residents were under the age of 18 and 13.1% were 65 years of age or older. For every 100 females there were 86.3 males, and for every 100 females age 18 and over there were 78.3 males age 18 and over.

0.0% of residents lived in urban areas, while 100.0% lived in rural areas.

There were 772 households in Cottonport, of which 39.2% had children under the age of 18 living in them. Of all households, 29.8% were married-couple households, 16.8% were households with a male householder and no spouse or partner present, and 41.8% were households with a female householder and no spouse or partner present. About 28.4% of all households were made up of individuals, and 13.0% had someone living alone who was 65 years of age or older.

There were 883 housing units, of which 12.6% were vacant. The homeowner vacancy rate was 1.7% and the rental vacancy rate was 7.9%.

== Notable people ==
- Bill Callegari, Republican member of the Texas House of Representatives; born in Cottonport
- Moon Ducote, football, baseball, and basketball player and coach, born in Cottonport.
