= Bunkie, Louisiana =

- City
- Motto: "The best place top side God's Green Earth"
- Location of Bunkie in Avoyelles Parish, Louisiana.

- Location of Louisiana in the United States
- Coordinates: 30°57′13″N 92°11′08″W
- Country: United States
- State: Louisiana
- Parish: Avoyelles

Government

Area
  - Total: 3.04 sq mi (7.87 km^{2})
  - Land: 3.02 sq mi (7.83 km^{2})
  - Water: 0.015 sq mi (0.04 km^{2})
- Elevation: 66 ft (20 m)

Population (2020)
  - Total: 3,346
  - Density: 1,107.2/sq mi (427.48/km^{2})
- Time zone: UTC-6 (CST)
  - Summer (DST): UTC-5 (CDT)
- Zip Code: 71322
- Area code: 318
- FIPS code: 22-10950
- Website: bunkie.net

Bunkie is a city in Avoyelles Parish, Louisiana, United States. As of the 2020 census, Bunkie had a population of 3,346.

== History ==
Bunkie was founded as a station terminus on the Texas and Pacific Railroad line. It was named for the daughter (whose nickname was "Bunkie") of the original landowner.

The federal post office in town contains a mural, Cotton Pickers, painted in 1939 during the Great Depression by Caroline Speare Rohland. Federally commissioned murals were produced from 1934 to 1943 in the United States through the Section of Painting and Sculpture, later called the Section of Fine Arts, of the Treasury Department. This work was part of the effort by the federal government to employ artists during the difficult Depression years.

The area around Bunkie is devoted to agriculture; since the late 20th century, corn has been an important commodity crop. Since 1987, Bunkie has hosted the annual Louisiana Corn Festival during the second full weekend of June.

== Geography ==
According to the United States Census Bureau, the city has a total area of 2.69 square miles (6.97 km^{2}), of which 2.68 square miles (6.93 km^{2}) is land and 0.015 square miles (0.04 km^{2}), or 0.57%, is water.

=== Climate ===
Bunkie has a humid subtropical climate (Köppen: Cfa) with long, hot summers and short, mild winters.

Climate data for Bunkie, Louisiana (1991–2020 normals, extremes 1956–present)
Month	Jan	Feb	Mar	Apr	May	Jun	Jul	Aug	Sep	Oct	Nov	Dec	Year
Record high °F (°C)	81 (27)	85 (29)	88 (31)	93 (34)	99 (37)	102 (39)	103 (39)	107 (42)	106 (41)	98 (37)	89 (32)	83 (28)	107 (42)
Mean maximum °F (°C)	75.8 (24.3)	78.6 (25.9)	83.0 (28.3)	87.2 (30.7)	91.8 (33.2)	95.8 (35.4)	97.5 (36.4)	98.6 (37.0)	95.7 (35.4)	90.6 (32.6)	83.2 (28.4)	78.4 (25.8)	98.6 (37.0)
Mean daily maximum °F (°C)	60.2 (15.7)	64.1 (17.8)	71.6 (22.0)	78.6 (25.9)	85.5 (29.7)	90.7 (32.6)	92.8 (33.8)	93.3 (34.1)	89.0 (31.7)	80.7 (27.1)	70.1 (21.2)	62.3 (16.8)	78.2 (25.7)
Daily mean °F (°C)	49.7 (9.8)	53.4 (11.9)	60.4 (15.8)	67.3 (19.6)	74.9 (23.8)	80.5 (26.9)	82.8 (28.2)	82.5 (28.1)	77.7 (25.4)	68.1 (20.1)	58.1 (14.5)	51.7 (10.9)	67.3 (19.6)
Mean daily minimum °F (°C)	39.2 (4.0)	42.6 (5.9)	49.3 (9.6)	56.0 (13.3)	64.3 (17.9)	70.4 (21.3)	72.7 (22.6)	71.8 (22.1)	66.4 (19.1)	55.5 (13.1)	46.1 (7.8)	41.0 (5.0)	56.3 (13.5)
Mean minimum °F (°C)	24.3 (−4.3)	29.4 (−1.4)	33.5 (0.8)	41.3 (5.2)	51.7 (10.9)	63.3 (17.4)	67.3 (19.6)	65.7 (18.7)	54.1 (12.3)	40.4 (4.7)	31.3 (−0.4)	27.7 (−2.4)	23.0 (−5.0)
Record low °F (°C)	10 (−12)	13 (−11)	23 (−5)	33 (1)	32 (0)	50 (10)	56 (13)	55 (13)	38 (3)	27 (−3)	22 (−6)	8 (−13)	8 (−13)
Average precipitation inches (mm)	6.79 (172)	5.30 (135)	4.67 (119)	5.92 (150)	5.01 (127)	4.86 (123)	4.14 (105)	4.68 (119)	4.52 (115)	4.76 (121)	5.45 (138)	5.33 (135)	61.63 (1,565)
Average precipitation days (≥ 0.01 in)	10.4	9.3	8.6	7.2	7.8	10.3	10.0	9.0	7.2	6.7	7.9	10.0	104.4
Source: NOAA

== Demographics ==
Historical population
Census	Pop.	Note	%±
1890	299		—
1900	873		192.0%
1910	1,765		102.2%
1920	1,743		−1.2%
1930	2,464		41.4%
1940	3,575		45.1%
1950	4,666		30.5%
1960	5,188		11.2%
1970	5,395		4.0%
1980	5,364		−0.6%
1990	5,044		−6.0%
2000	4,662		−7.6%
2010	4,171		−10.5%
2020	3,346		−19.8%
2025 (est.)	3,138	▼	−6.2%
U.S. Decennial Census

=== Racial and ethnic composition ===
Bunkie city, Louisiana – Racial and ethnic composition Note: the US Census treats Hispanic/Latino as an ethnic category. This table excludes Latinos from the racial categories and assigns them to a separate category. Hispanics/Latinos may be of any race.
Race / Ethnicity (NH = Non-Hispanic)	Pop 2000	Pop 2010	Pop 2020	% 2000	% 2010	% 2020
White alone (NH)	2,219	1,630	1,070	47.60%	39.08%	31.98%
Black or African American alone (NH)	2,338	2,375	2,041	50.15%	56.94%	61.00%
Native American or Alaska Native alone (NH)	2	22	9	0.04%	0.53%	0.27%
Asian alone (NH)	13	21	10	0.28%	0.50%	0.30%
Native Hawaiian or Pacific Islander alone (NH)	0	0	0	0.00%	0.00%	0.00%
Other race alone (NH)	0	0	4	0.00%	0.00%	0.12%
Mixed race or Multiracial (NH)	21	39	145	0.45%	0.94%	4.33%
Hispanic or Latino (any race)	69	84	67	1.48%	2.01%	2.00%
Total	4,662	4,171	3,346	100.00%	100.00%	100.00%

=== 2020 census ===
As of the 2020 census, Bunkie had a population of 3,346. The median age was 41.7 years. 22.8% of residents were under the age of 18 and 22.4% of residents were 65 years of age or older. For every 100 females there were 87.3 males, and for every 100 females age 18 and over there were 81.6 males age 18 and over.

0.0% of residents lived in urban areas, while 100.0% lived in rural areas.

There were 1,385 households in Bunkie, of which 29.0% had children under the age of 18 living in them. Of all households, 30.1% were married-couple households, 19.6% were households with a male householder and no spouse or partner present, and 43.8% were households with a female householder and no spouse or partner present. About 35.6% of all households were made up of individuals and 18.2% had someone living alone who was 65 years of age or older.

There were 1,851 housing units, of which 25.2% were vacant. The homeowner vacancy rate was 4.2% and the rental vacancy rate was 21.0%.

== Notable people ==
- Sue Eakin, Louisiana historian and former publisher of the Bunkie Record
- Donald E. Hines, Physician and former member of the Louisiana State Senate
- Ronnie Johns, a former member of the Louisiana State Senate
- Zutty Singleton jazz drummer
- Seymour Weiss, prominent New Orleans civic leader, born in Bunkie in 1896.
