= List of unincorporated communities in Louisiana =

List of unincorporated communities in Louisiana is the list of populated places.

== A ==
- Albany
- Anacoco
- Angie
- Ashland, Concordia Parish
- Athens
- Atlanta

== B ==
- Baskin
- Belcher
- Bethany
- Bienville
- Bonita
- Bryceland
- Bueche

== C ==
- Calvin
- Cankton
- Castor
- Chamberlin: St. Mark Baptist Church (1877) and Ashland Cemetery are on the NRHP.
- Chataignier
- Choudrant
- Clarence
- Clarks
- Collinston
- Converse
- Creola

== D ==
- Delta
- Devalls
- Dixie Inn
- Dodson
- Downsville
- Doyline
- Dry Prong
- Dubberly

== E ==
- East Hodge
- Edgefield
- Epps
- Estherwood
- Evangeline
- Evans
- Elizabeth

== F ==
- Fenton
- Fisher
- Flora
- Florence
- Florien
- Folsom
- Forest
- Forest Hill
- French Settlement

== G ==
- Georgetown
- Gilbert
- Gilliam
- Goldonna
- Grand Bayou, Plaquemines Parish
- Grand Bayou, Red River Parish
- Grand Cane
- Grayson
- Grosse Tete

== H ==
- Hall Summit
- Harrisonburg
- Heflin
- Hessmer
- Hodge
- Hosston

== I ==
- Ida
- Ithra
- Isle Brevelle

== J ==
- Jamestown
- Junction City

== K ==
- Kahns
- Kilbourne

== L ==
- Lillie
- Lisbon
- Lobdell
- Longstreet
- Loreauville
- Lucky
- Lukeville

== M ==
- Martin
- Maurice
- McNary
- Mer Rouge
- Mermentau
- Montpelier
- Moreauville
- Morganza
- Morse
- Mound

== N ==
- Napoleonville
- Natchez
- Noble
- North Hodge
- North Rodessa
- Norwood

== O ==
- Oak Ridge

== P ==
- Palmetto
- Parks
- Pine Prairie
- Pioneer
- Plaucheville
- Pleasant Hill, Lincoln Parish
- Pleasant Hill, Natchitoches Parish
- Port Vincent
- Powhatan
- Provencal

== Q ==
- Quitman

== R ==
- Reeves
- Richmond

== S ==
- Saline
- Shongaloo
- Sicily Island
- Sikes
- Simpson
- Simsboro
- South Mansfield
- Spearsville
- Stanley
- Sun

== T ==
- Tangipahoa
- Tickfaw
- Turkey Creek

== V ==
- Varnado

== W ==
- Wilson
- Winterville

== See also ==
- List of cities, towns, and villages in Louisiana
