= Pineville Expressway =

U.S. Highway 167
- Pineville Expressway

Route information
- Maintained by Louisiana DOTD
- Length: 10.5 mi (16.9 km)
- Existed: 1963–present

Major junctions
- South end: I-49 / US 167 / LA 28 in Alexandria
- US 165 in Pineville; US 71 near Pineville
- North end: US 167 / LA 3225 near Creola

Location
- Country: United States
- State: Louisiana
- Parishes: Rapides

Highway system
- United States Numbered Highway System; List; Special; Divided; Louisiana State Highway System; Interstate; US; State; Scenic

The Pineville Expressway is a four-lane controlled-access freeway that extends from I-49 in Alexandria through Pineville. It carries US 167 for all of its length, but also carries US 71 and LA 28 for some distance also. It follows the original routing of LA 3026 for some distance, as the highway has been extended over time. It also serves as a bypass around the residential areas of Pineville and Tioga.

== History ==
Construction of the Pineville Expressway began in 1963. It would later be incorporated into US 167. It originally carried four lanes of LA 3026 across the Red River on a lift bridge, carrying the highway along a railroad line, past Louisiana College, and around Pineville to meet US 165.

Later in the 1970s, the Pineville Expressway connected north, bypassing Tioga and ending just south of the Grant Parish line. U.S. 167 and U.S. 71 were rerouted onto this alignment, with the old road through Tioga becoming LA 3225.

== Exit list ==
The entire highway is in Rapides Parish.

Location	mi	km	Destinations	Notes
Alexandria	0.0– 0.6	0.0– 0.97	I-49 / US 167 south / LA 28 west – Opelousas, Shreveport	Exit 84 (I-49); southern end of LA 28 concurrency
Alexandria	0.9	1.4	LA 1 / LA 28 Bus. west – Downtown Alexandria	Northbound entrance / southbound exit only; eastern terminus of LA 28 Bus.
Pineville	1.2– 1.7	1.9– 2.7	To LA 150 (Shamrock Street) – Downtown Pineville	
Pineville	2.1– 2.3	3.4– 3.7	LA 107 south / LA 1250 (Shamrock Street) – Effie, Marksville, Louisiana College	Northern terminus of LA 107
Pineville	2.9– 3.3	4.7– 5.3	LA 28 east / LA 3100 west (Griffith Street) – Pineville, Jonesville	Northern end of LA 28 concurrency; eastern terminus of LA 3100
Pineville	4.2– 4.6	6.8– 7.4	US 165 Bus. south / LA 3144 south (Edgewood Drive)	
Pineville	4.8– 5.3	7.7– 8.5	US 165 – Monroe, Alexandria	
Tioga	6.7– 7.1	10.8– 11.4	US 71 south / LA 3225 north – Tioga	Southern end of US 71 concurrency; southern terminus of LA 3225
	9.8	15.8	US 71 north – Shreveport	Northbound exit / southbound entrance only; northern end of US 71 concurrency
Creola	10.5	16.9	US 167 / LA 3225 – Winnfield, Ruston	
1.000 mi = 1.609 km; 1.000 km = 0.621 mi

== Louisiana Highway 3026 ==
Louisiana Highway 3026
- Location: Rapides Parish
- Length: 4.9 mi (7.9 km)
- Existed: 1963–1978

Louisiana Highway 3026 (LA 3026) was a state highway in Louisiana that served Rapides Parish. Running from Pineville to Tioga, it has been superseded by US 167.

LA 3026 began at an intersection with LA 28, which took over the lower half of the Pineville Expressway. LA 3026 was the slow extension of the Expressway, built in segments to meet US 165, and was pushed forward to meet US 71 and US 167. Once LA 3026 was extended around Tioga to meet LA 3225, US 71/167 was moved onto the alignment. US 71 remained on the alignment from US 165 through the VA complex, while US 167 was shifted completely, deleting the designation of LA 3026 in 1978.
