= Jimmie Davis State Park =

State park in Louisiana, United States

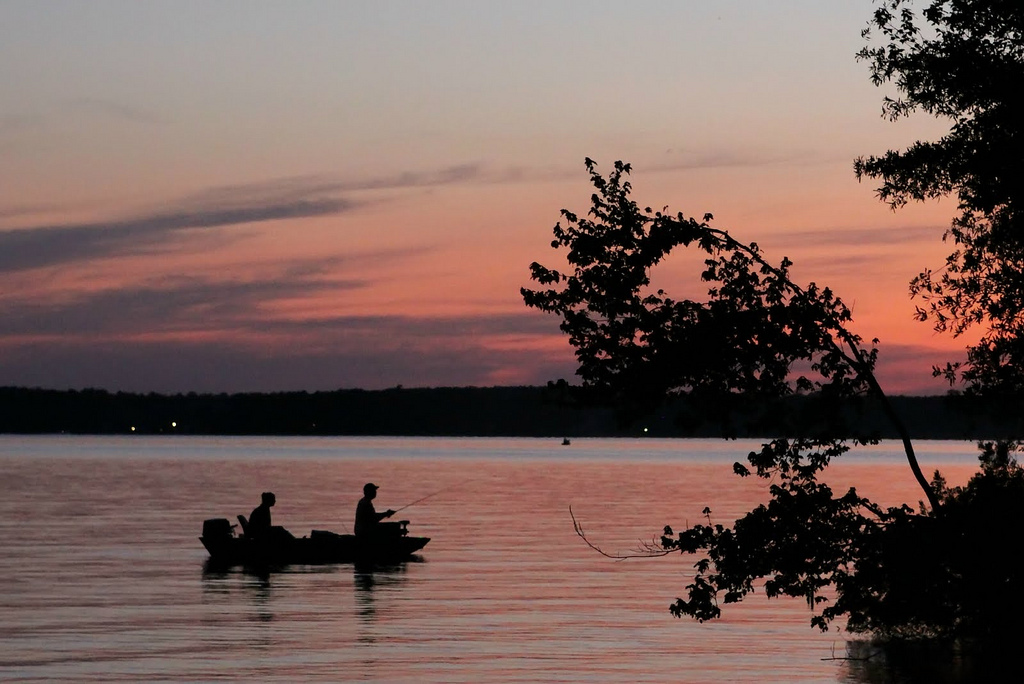
- Fishing on Caney Lake Reservoir in Jimmie Davis State Park.

- Location within Louisiana
- Location: Jackson Parish, Louisiana, USA
- Coordinates: 32°17′31″N 92°30′44″W
- Area: 294 acres (119 ha)
- Established: 1996
- Visitors: 116,233 (in 2022)
- Governing body: Louisiana Office of State Parks
- Website: www.crt.state.la.us/parks/ijimmiedavis.aspx

Jimmie Davis State Park is one of twenty-two state parks in the U.S. state of Louisiana. It is located near Chatham in Jackson Parish on the northern shore of Caney Creek Lake, a 5,000 acres (2,000 ha) reservoir.

== History ==
Upon its inception in 1996, the facility was named Caney Creek Lake State Park. In 2003, it was renamed in honor of the former Governor Jimmie Davis, a native of nearby Quitman in Jackson Parish. A country-western singer and film star in the 1940s and 1950s, Davis was twice elected as governor, serving from 1944 to 1948 and from 1960 to 1964.

Nearby cities include Jonesboro (15 miles), Ruston (28 miles), and West Monroe (30 miles).

== Activities ==
Jimmie Davis State Park encompasses the mixed pine-hardwood forested peninsula at Caney Creek Lake. It provides water access with two boat launches and a fishing pier. Accommodations are provided with 17 deluxe cabins, 2 deluxe lodges for larger groups, and 73 campsites. The cabins and premium campsites are located near the waterfront.

Many of the largest bass caught in Louisiana have come from Caney Lake Reservoir. As of 2010, the largest bass from Louisiana, which weighed 16 pounds, was caught at Caney Lake.

Cabins and lodges are equipped with satellite television, fireplace, cookware, and linens. Each has access to a boat dock with power connections for boats.

Cycling is popular in the area. Several miles of country lanes and roads pass within and outside the park for easy exploring. The park is the home of abundant wildlife, including white-tailed deer, raccoon, opossum, squirrels, rabbits, and waterfowl.

Jimmie Davis State Park
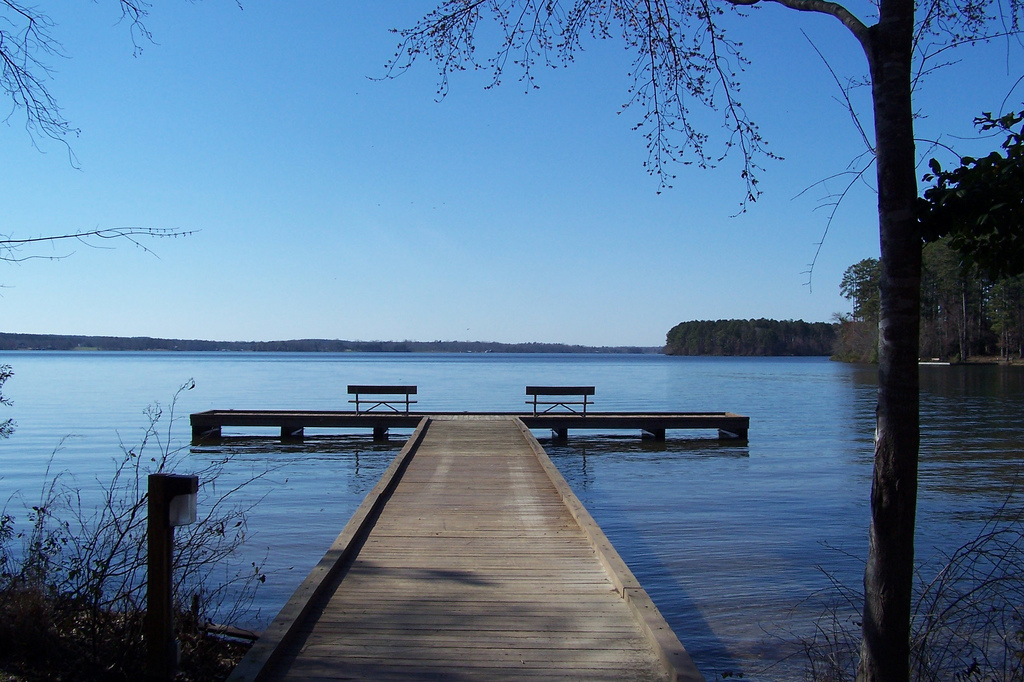
Boat dock at cabins 3 & 4.

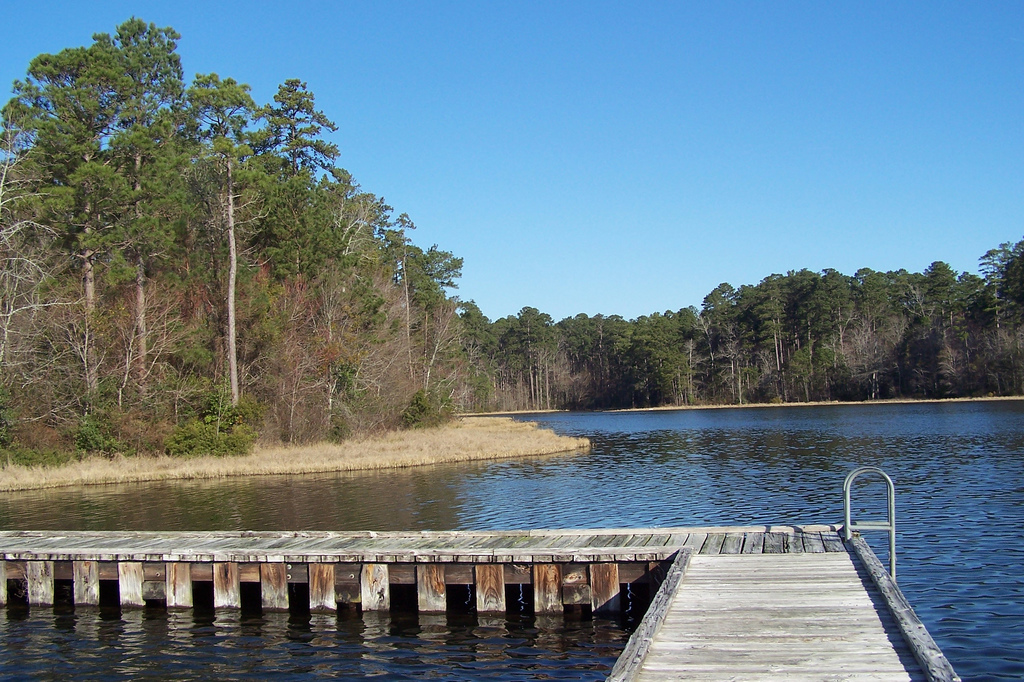
Another dock on Caney Lake Reservoir.
