= East Hodge, Louisiana =

- Village
- Location of East Hodge in Jackson Parish, Louisiana

- Location of Louisiana in the United States
- Coordinates: 32°16′39″N 92°42′51″W
- Country: United States
- State: Louisiana
- Parish: Jackson

Area
  - Total: 0.24 sq mi (0.61 km^{2})
  - Land: 0.24 sq mi (0.61 km^{2})
  - Water: 0 sq mi (0.00 km^{2})
- Elevation: 203 ft (62 m)

Population (2020)
  - Total: 204
  - Density: 871.4/sq mi (336.46/km^{2})
- Time zone: UTC-6 (CST)
  - Summer (DST): UTC-5 (CDT)
- Area code: 318
- FIPS code: 22-22465
- GNIS feature ID: 2407446

East Hodge is a village in Jackson Parish, Louisiana, United States. As of the 2020 census, East Hodge had a population of 204. It is part of the Ruston Micropolitan Statistical Area.

== Geography ==
East Hodge is located in southwestern Jackson Parish. It is bordered to the west by Hodge and to the northwest by North Hodge. U.S. Route 167, running through Hodge and North Hodge, leads north 5 miles (8 km) to Quitman and south 3 miles (5 km) to Jonesboro.

According to the United States Census Bureau, East Hodge has a total area of 0.2 square miles (0.6 km^{2}), of which 0.18 acres (734 m^{2}), or 0.12%, are water. The village sits on high ground between the Dugdemona River to the northwest and the Little Dugdemona River to the south.

== Demographics ==
Historical population
Census	Pop.	Note	%±
1970	363		—
1980	439		20.9%
1990	421		−4.1%
2000	366		−13.1%
2010	289		−21.0%
2020	204		−29.4%
2025 (est.)	214	▲	4.9%
U.S. Decennial Census

=== 2020 census ===
East Hodge village, Louisiana – Racial and ethnic composition Note: the US Census treats Hispanic/Latino as an ethnic category. This table excludes Latinos from the racial categories and assigns them to a separate category. Hispanics/Latinos may be of any race.
Race / Ethnicity (NH = Non-Hispanic)	Pop 2000	Pop 2010	Pop 2020	% 2000	% 2010	% 2020
White alone (NH)	17	20	6	4.64%	6.92%	2.94%
Black or African American alone (NH)	348	256	193	95.08%	88.58%	94.61%
Native American or Alaska Native alone (NH)	1	0	0	0.27%	0.00%	0.00%
Asian alone (NH)	0	0	0	0.00%	0.00%	0.00%
Native Hawaiian or Pacific Islander alone (NH)	0	0	0	0.00%	0.00%	0.00%
Other race alone (NH)	0	0	0	0.00%	0.00%	0.00%
Mixed race or Multiracial (NH)	0	5	3	0.00%	1.73%	1.47%
Hispanic or Latino (any race)	0	8	2	0.00%	2.77%	0.98%
Total	366	289	204	100.00%	100.00%	100.00%

As of the census of 2000, there were 366 people, 135 households, and 100 families residing in the village. The population density was 1,529.2 inhabitants per square mile (590.4/km^{2}). There were 157 housing units at an average density of 656.0 per square mile (253.3/km^{2}). The racial makeup of the village was 4.64% White, 95.08% African American, and 0.27% Native American.

There were 135 households, out of which 39.3% had children under the age of 18 living with them, 29.6% were married couples living together, 43.0% had a female householder with no husband present, and 25.2% were non-families. 24.4% of all households were made up of individuals, and 11.9% had someone living alone who was 65 years of age or older. The average household size was 2.71 and the average family size was 3.22.

In the village, the population was spread out, with 37.4% under the age of 18, 9.3% from 18 to 24, 21.3% from 25 to 44, 20.8% from 45 to 64, and 11.2% who were 65 years of age or older. The median age was 28 years. For every 100 females, there were 71.8 males. For every 100 females age 18 and over, there were 63.6 males.

The median income for a household in the village was $11,786, and the median income for a family was $14,432. Males had a median income of $25,250 versus $12,159 for females. The per capita income for the village was $7,616. About 46.6% of families and 51.1% of the population were below the poverty line, including 66.4% of those under age 18 and 37.0% of those age 65 or over.
