= Marvin T. Culpepper =

American politician (1908–1970)

Marvin Tandy Culpepper, Sr.

Louisiana State Representative from Jackson Parish
- In office 1964–1968
- Preceded by: I. J. Allen
- Succeeded by: E. L. "Bubba" Henry

Personal details
- Born: November 26, 1908 Jonesboro, Jackson Parish; Louisiana, US
- Died: January 31, 1970 (aged 61) Hodge, Jackson Parish
- Resting place: Springhill Cemetery in Jonesboro
- Party: Democratic
- Spouse: Ezelle Fleming Culpepper (married 1938–1970, his death)
- Children: Marvin T. Culpepper, Jr. Mark Alan Culpepper; Kathy Belle Culpepper John Fleming Culpepper
- Occupation: Engineer; farmer

Military service
- Branch/service: United States Army
- Battles/wars: World War II

Marvin Tandy Culpepper, Sr. (November 26, 1908 – January 31, 1970), was an engineer, machinist, and farmer from Jackson Parish in North Louisiana, who served from 1964 to 1968 as a Democrat in the Louisiana House of Representatives. His one term in office coincided with the first term of Governor John McKeithen. He was defeated for reelection by his fellow Democrat E. L. "Bubba" Henry, who in his second term in the chamber became the House Speaker.

Preceded by I. J. Allen	Louisiana State Representative from Jackson Parish; Marvin Tandy Culpepper, Sr. 1964—1968	Succeeded by E. L. "Bubba" Henry
