= Jackson Parish, Louisiana =

Parish in Louisiana, United States

Jackson Parish
- Parish
- Parish of Jackson; Paroisse de Jackson (French)
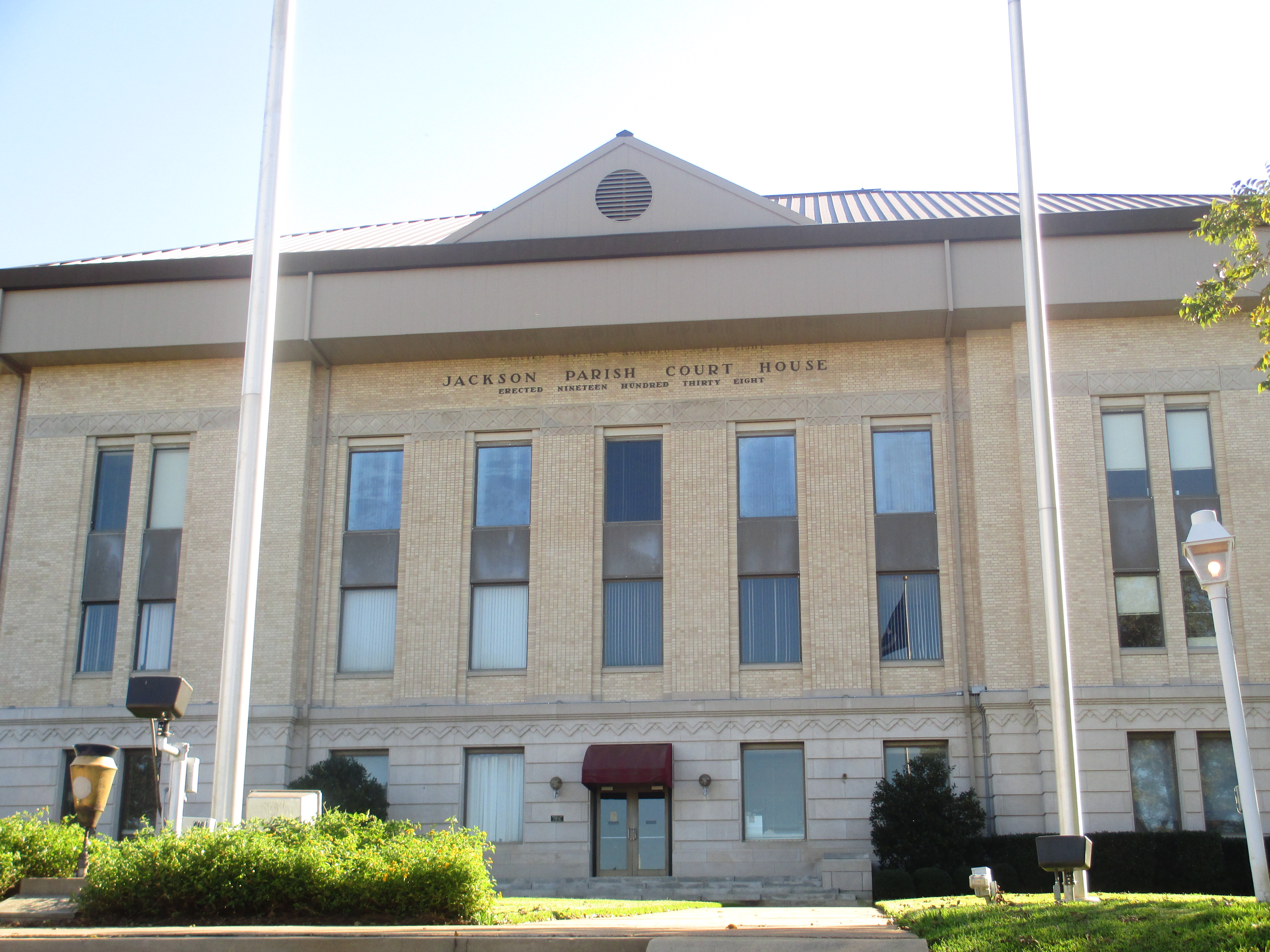
- Jackson Parish Courthouse in Jonesboro

- Seal

- Location within the U.S. state of Louisiana
- Coordinates: 32°18′N 92°33′W
- Country: United States
- State: Louisiana
- Founded: 1845
- Named for: Andrew Jackson
- Seat: Jonesboro
- Largest town: Jonesboro

Area
  - Total: 580 sq mi (1,500 km^{2})
  - Land: 569 sq mi (1,470 km^{2})
  - Water: 11 sq mi (28 km^{2}) 1.9%

Population (2020)
  - Total: 15,031
  - Estimate (2025): 15,834 ▲
  - Density: 26.4/sq mi (10.2/km^{2})
- Time zone: UTC−6 (Central)
  - Summer (DST): UTC−5 (CDT)
- Congressional district: 5th
- Website: www.jacksonparishpolicejury.org/Default.aspx

Jackson Parish (French: Paroisse de Jackson) is a parish in the northern part of the U.S. state of Louisiana. As of the 2020 census, the population was 15,031. The parish seat is Jonesboro. The parish was formed in 1845 from parts of Claiborne, Ouachita, and Union Parishes. In the 20th century, this part of the state had several small industrial mill towns, such as Jonesboro. East of Jonesboro is the Jimmie Davis State Park, which includes Caney Lake Reservoir.

== History ==
Jackson Parish was founded in 1845 after Indian Removal and named for President Andrew Jackson.

=== Civil War ===
During the American Civil War Confederate General Richard Taylor sent five companies into Jackson and Winn parishes to arrest conscripts who failed to report for duty, and to halt jayhawker groups in the area.

=== 20th century to present ===
Jonesboro became an industrial mill town in the 20th century, producing lumber and turpentine products from the pine forests. Industrialization stimulated its growth. By the 1950s and 1960s, numerous African Americans had become industrial workers. Many were veterans of World War II and the Korean War, and they began to press to gain civil rights in the segregated state and region. Ku Klux Klan chapters were active here, and they intimidated and attacked civil rights activists.

In November 1964 Rev. Frederick Douglass Kirkpatrick, ordained that year as a minister of the Church of God in Christ, and Earnest "Chilly Willy" Thomas founded the Deacons for Defense and Justice, an organized African-American, armed self-defense group to protect activists and their families.

In February 1965, these two men and other CORE workers traveled 300 miles to Bogalusa, Louisiana, another small mill town, where they founded another chapter of the Deacons. They advised local activists on strategies of self-defense. They helped found chapters of the Deacons in other cities of Louisiana, as well as in Mississippi and Alabama in these years.

== Geography ==
According to the U.S. Census Bureau, the parish has a total area of 580 square miles (1,500 km^{2}), of which 569 square miles (1,470 km^{2}) is land and 11 square miles (28 km^{2}) (1.9%) is water.

=== Major highways ===
- U.S. Highway 167
- Louisiana Highway 4
- Louisiana Highway 34
- Louisiana Highway 145
- Louisiana Highway 146
- Louisiana Highway 147
- Louisiana Highway 148
- Louisiana Highway 155
- Louisiana Highway 499
- Louisiana Highway 505
- Louisiana Highway 542
- Louisiana Highway 548
- Louisiana Highway 556
- Louisiana Highway 810
- Louisiana Highway 811
- Louisiana Highway 813-3
- Louisiana Highway 818
- Louisiana Highway 1255
- Louisiana Highway 3061

=== Adjacent parishes ===
- Lincoln Parish (north)
- Ouachita Parish (northeast)
- Caldwell Parish (southeast)
- Winn Parish (south)
- Bienville Parish (west)

== Communities ==
=== Towns ===
- Chatham
- Eros
- Jonesboro (parish seat and largest municipality)

=== Villages ===
- East Hodge
- Hodge
- North Hodge
- Quitman

=== Unincorporated communities ===
- Ansley
- Antioch
- Pleasant Hill
- Walker
- Weston

== Demographics ==
Historical population
Census	Pop.	Note	%±
1850	5,566		—
1860	9,465		70.1%
1870	7,646		−19.2%
1880	5,328		−30.3%
1890	7,453		39.9%
1900	9,119		22.4%
1910	13,818		51.5%
1920	14,486		4.8%
1930	13,808		−4.7%
1940	17,807		29.0%
1950	15,434		−13.3%
1960	15,828		2.6%
1970	15,963		0.9%
1980	17,321		8.5%
1990	15,705		−9.3%
2000	15,752		0.3%
2010	16,274		3.3%
2020	15,031		−7.6%
2025 (est.)	15,834	▲	5.3%
U.S. Decennial Census; 1790–1960 1900–1990; 1990–2000 2010–2013

=== 2020 census ===
As of the 2020 census, the parish had a population of 15,031, 6,064 households, and 4,015 families. The median age was 42.6 years; 21.6% of residents were under the age of 18 and 21.0% of residents were 65 years of age or older. For every 100 females there were 96.2 males, and for every 100 females age 18 and over there were 92.7 males age 18 and over.

The racial makeup of the parish was 66.3% White, 26.3% Black or African American, 0.2% American Indian and Alaska Native, 1.0% Asian, <0.1% Native Hawaiian and Pacific Islander, 2.0% from some other race, and 4.1% from two or more races. Hispanic or Latino residents of any race comprised 3.1% of the population.

34.9% of residents lived in urban areas, while 65.1% lived in rural areas.

There were 6,064 households in the parish, of which 29.0% had children under the age of 18 living in them. Of all households, 43.7% were married-couple households, 19.4% were households with a male householder and no spouse or partner present, and 31.6% were households with a female householder and no spouse or partner present. About 30.9% of all households were made up of individuals and 15.0% had someone living alone who was 65 years of age or older.

There were 7,182 housing units, of which 15.6% were vacant. Among occupied housing units, 73.1% were owner-occupied and 26.9% were renter-occupied. The homeowner vacancy rate was 0.8% and the rental vacancy rate was 10.5%.

=== Racial and ethnic composition ===
Jackson Parish, Louisiana – Racial and ethnic composition Note: the US Census treats Hispanic/Latino as an ethnic category. This table excludes Latinos from the racial categories and assigns them to a separate category. Hispanics/Latinos may be of any race.
Race / Ethnicity (NH = Non-Hispanic)	Pop 1980	Pop 1990	Pop 2000	Pop 2010	Pop 2020	% 1980	% 1990	% 2000	% 2010	% 2020
White alone (NH)	11,676	11,029	8,607	10,989	9,896	67.41%	70.23%	54.64%	67.52%	65.84%
Black or African American alone (NH)	5,480	4,580	6,860	4,829	3,945	31.64%	29.16%	43.55%	29.67%	26.25%
Native American or Alaska Native alone (NH)	18	23	39	34	34	0.10%	0.15%	0.25%	0.21%	0.23%
Asian alone (NH)	19	18	24	28	146	0.11%	0.11%	0.15%	0.17%	0.97%
Native Hawaiian or Pacific Islander alone (NH)	x	x	0	2	5	x	x	0.00%	0.01%	0.03%
Other race alone (NH)	9	5	2	1	23	0.05%	0.03%	0.01%	0.01%	0.15%
Mixed race or Multiracial (NH)	x	x	71	182	514	x	x	0.45%	1.12%	3.42%
Hispanic or Latino (any race)	119	50	149	209	468	0.69%	0.32%	0.95%	1.28%	3.11%
Total	17,321	15,705	15,752	16,274	15,031	100.00%	100.00%	100.00%	100.00%	100.00%

=== 2000 census ===
At the census of 2000, there were 15,397 people, 6,086 households, and 4,302 families residing in the parish. The population density was 27 people per square mile (10 people/km^{2}). There were 7,338 housing units at an average density of 13 per square mile (5.0/km^{2}).

Among the population in 2000, 31.70% had children under the age of 18 living with them, 52.80% were married couples living together, 14.40% had a female householder with no husband present, and 29.30% were non-families. 27.00% of all households were made up of individuals, and 13.50% had someone living alone who was 65 years of age or older. The average household size was 2.48 and the average family size was 3.01.

In 2000, the racial makeup of the parish was 71.01% White, 27.87% Black or African American, 0.29% Native American, 0.21% Asian, 0.01% Pacific Islander, 0.24% from other races, and 0.37% from two or more races. 0.61% of the population were Hispanic or Latino of any race.

Among the 2000 population, the median income for a household in the parish was $28,352, and the median income for a family was $36,317. Males had a median income of $31,977 versus $19,992 for females. The per capita income for the parish was $15,354. About 16.00% of families and 19.80% of the population were below the poverty line, including 26.30% of those under age 18 and 15.80% of those age 65 or over.

=== Economic characteristics ===
In 2020, the median household income increased to $41,298 with home-owners paying $434 a month for monthly-housing costs.

== Politics ==
Jackson Parish was historically part of the Solid South, as Louisiana had disenfranchised most blacks in the state at the turn of the century, as had other southern states. This made the Republican Party non-competitive in the state and region, and excluded blacks from politics into the 1960s. The conservative whites consistently voted for Democratic candidates in the one-party region. Governor Al Smith of New York received 100 percent of the vote in 1928 (from white voters) in his losing race against Herbert C. Hoover.

In the 1960s, the majority of conservative white voters began to shift their support to Republican presidential candidates, and then to those at the state level. In 1960, Richard M. Nixon led parishwide with 43.9 percent against both John F. Kennedy and a rival slate of unpledged segregationist electors. These included future Governor David C. Treen and Leander Perez of Plaquemines Parish. In that election, blacks were still disenfranchised.

Jackson Parish has served as a reliable bellwether for the state of Louisiana, having voted for the statewide presidential winner in 15 straight elections since 1964. Since the late 20th century, Democrat Bill Clinton and Republican George W. Bush each carried the parish twice. In 1992, Clinton polled 3,370 votes (44.5 percent) to Republican George Herbert Walker Bush's 3,072 (40.6 percent). Another 882 ballots (11.7 percent) were held by Ross Perot of Texas, who ran as an Independent and thereafter founded his Reform Party.

In the 2008 U.S. presidential election, Republican U.S. Senator John McCain of Arizona outpolled Barack H. Obama of Illinois by 30 percentage points. In 2012, Republican Mitt Romney carried Jackson Parish. with 5,132 votes (68.2 percent) to President Obama's 2,305 ballots (30.6 percent), a margin of nearly 38 percentage points.

United States presidential election results for Jackson Parish, Louisiana
Year	Republican		Democratic		Third party(ies)	
Year	No.	%	No.	%	No.	%
1912	19	2.48%	561	73.14%	187	24.38%
1916	27	2.68%	980	97.13%	2	0.20%
1920	166	11.90%	1,229	88.10%	0	0.00%
1924	88	11.43%	682	88.57%	0	0.00%
1928	0	0.00%	907	100.00%	0	0.00%
1932	34	1.91%	1,748	98.09%	0	0.00%
1936	169	8.55%	1,807	91.45%	0	0.00%
1940	280	9.29%	2,734	90.71%	0	0.00%
1944	414	18.34%	1,840	81.52%	3	0.13%
1948	169	7.38%	713	31.15%	1,407	61.47%
1952	1,614	36.43%	2,817	63.57%	0	0.00%
1956	1,553	54.26%	916	32.01%	393	13.73%
1960	1,799	43.88%	1,398	34.10%	903	22.02%
1964	4,521	74.44%	1,552	25.56%	0	0.00%
1968	1,104	16.80%	1,525	23.21%	3,941	59.98%
1972	4,152	69.96%	1,477	24.89%	306	5.16%
1976	3,310	46.88%	3,605	51.06%	145	2.05%
1980	3,923	50.75%	3,609	46.69%	198	2.56%
1984	5,034	64.86%	2,568	33.09%	159	2.05%
1988	4,251	58.64%	2,842	39.21%	156	2.15%
1992	3,072	40.60%	3,370	44.54%	1,124	14.86%
1996	3,030	42.88%	3,368	47.66%	669	9.47%
2000	4,347	61.17%	2,582	36.34%	177	2.49%
2004	5,038	65.88%	2,525	33.02%	84	1.10%
2008	5,190	67.09%	2,456	31.75%	90	1.16%
2012	5,132	68.16%	2,305	30.61%	92	1.22%
2016	5,169	69.25%	2,139	28.66%	156	2.09%
2020	5,394	70.68%	2,143	28.08%	95	1.24%
2024	5,291	73.22%	1,852	25.63%	83	1.15%

== Education ==
Public schools in Jackson Parish are operated by the elected Jackson Parish School Board.

== National Guard ==
A Company 199TH FSB (Forward Support Battalion) of the 256TH IBCT resides in Jonesboro, Louisiana. This unit has deployed twice to Iraq in 2004-5 and 2010. Also deployed in 1990 for Operation Desert Shield/Desert Storm.

== Notable people ==
- Rodney Alexander, Republican U.S. representative
- Marvin T. Culpepper, member of the Louisiana House of Representatives from Jackson Parish from 1964 to 1968
- Jimmie Davis, Democratic former governor and singer by profession, born in Jackson Parish in 1899.

== Gallery ==
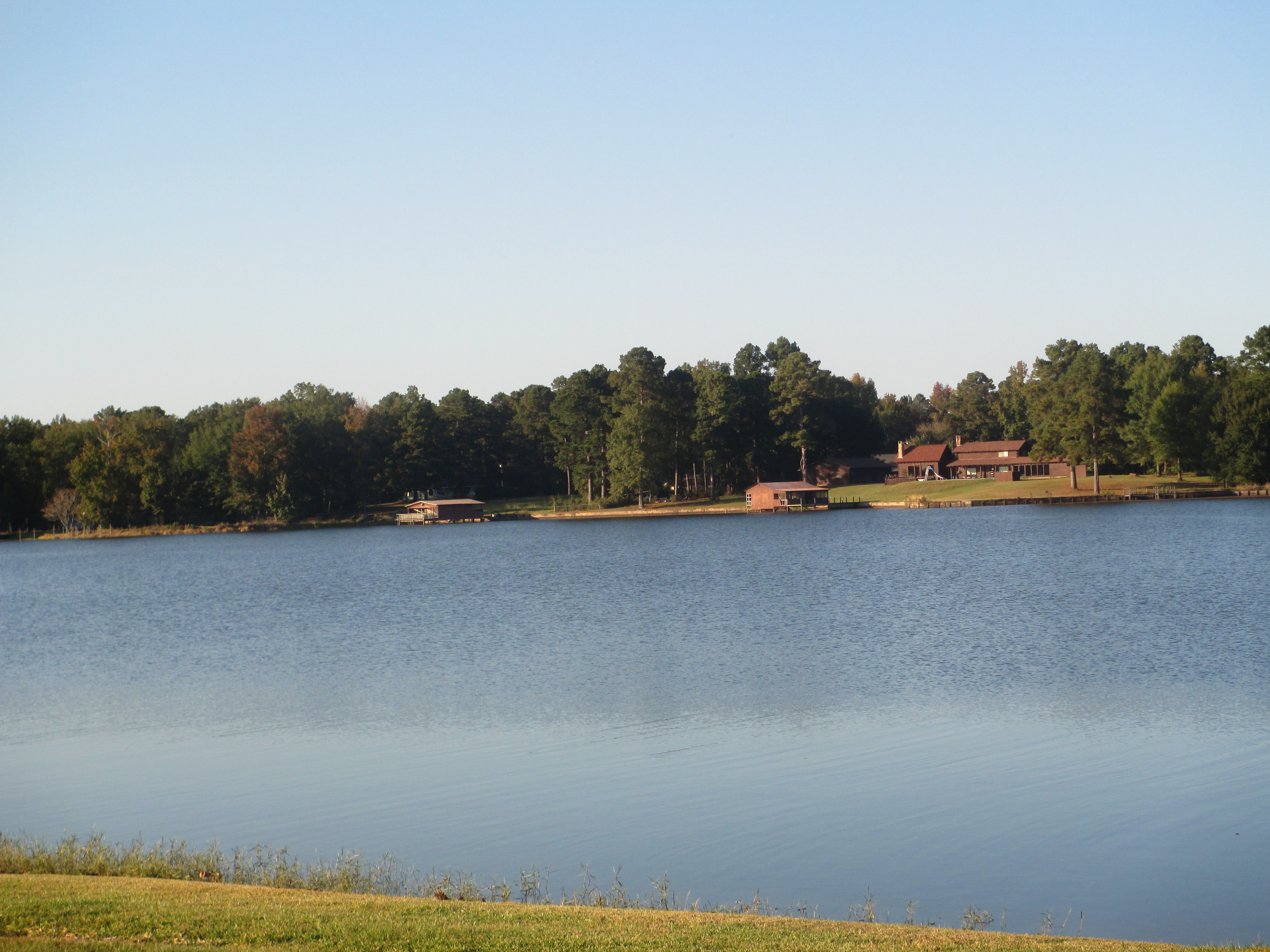
A portion of Caney Lake east of Jonesboro

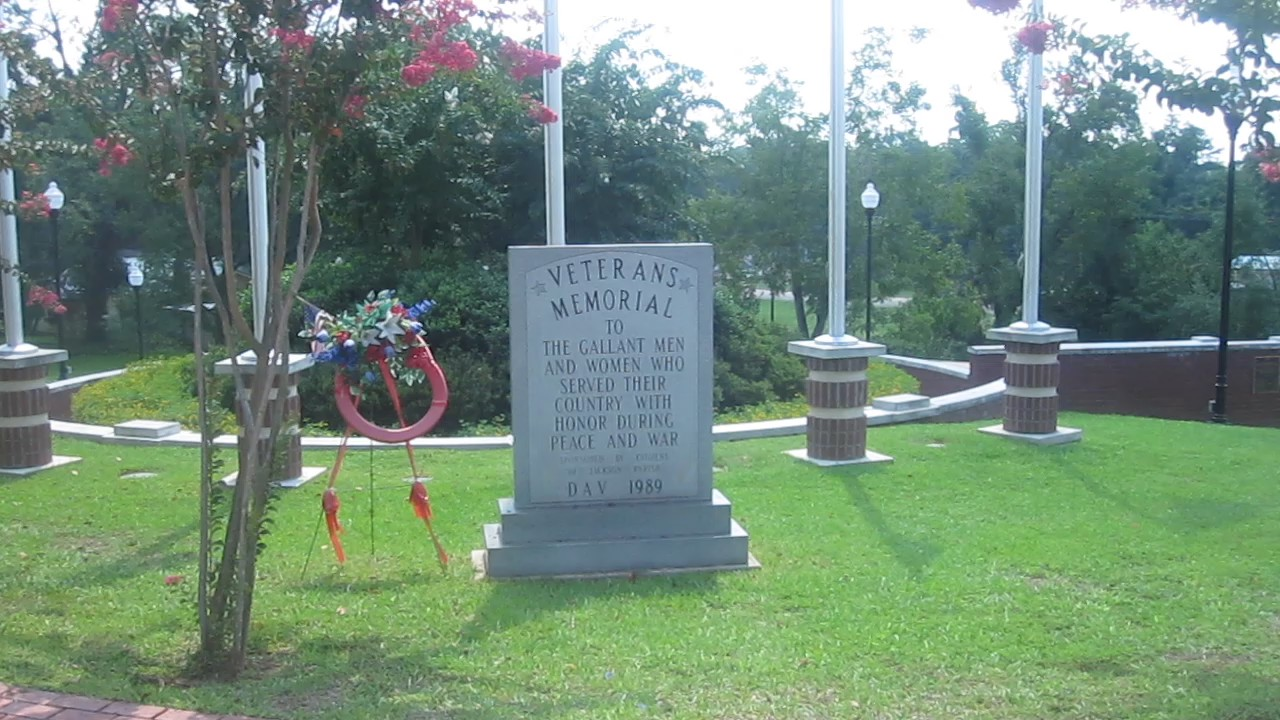
The Jackson Parish Veterans Memorial is located across from the parish library in Jonesboro.

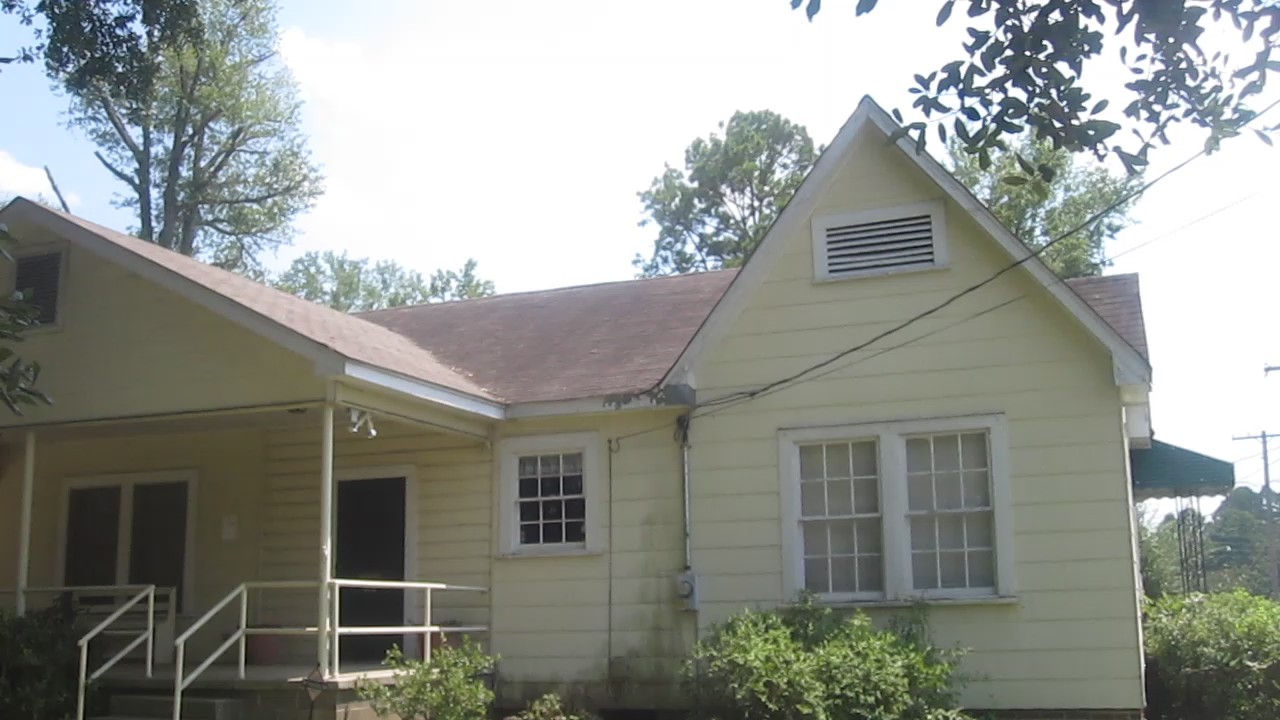
The Jackson Parish Museum and Fine Arts Association is located at 515 South Cooper Avenue in Jonesboro across from the First Baptist Church.

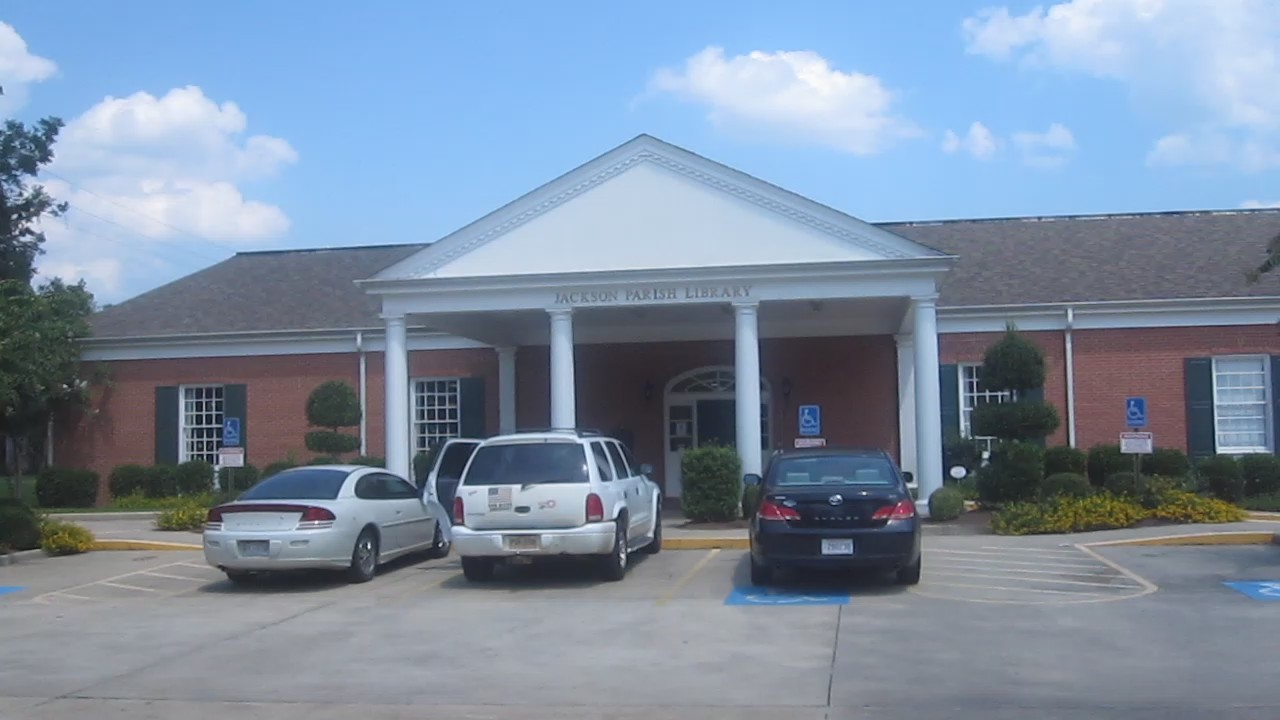
The Jackson Parish Library in Jonesboro

== See also ==
- Historical romance author Jennifer Blake lives in Quitman.
- National Register of Historic Places listings in Jackson Parish, Louisiana
