= U.S. Route 167 =

Highway in the United States

U.S. Route 167
- US 167 highlighted in red

Route information
- Auxiliary route of US 67
- Length: 500 mi (800 km)
- Existed: 1926–present
- Tourist routes: Louisiana Scenic Byways: Jean Lafitte Scenic Byway; Zydeco Cajun Prairie Scenic Byway

Major junctions
- South end: LA 14 Bus. in Abbeville, LA
- US 90 in Lafayette, LA; I-10 / I-49 in Lafayette, LA; US 71 in Lecompte, LA; I-49 in Alexandria, LA; US 84 in Winnfield, LA; US 80 in Ruston, LA; I-20 / US 63 / LA 146 in Ruston, LA; US 63 / US 82 in El Dorado, AR; I-30 / US 67 / I-440 in Little Rock, AR; I-40 / US 65 / AR 107 in North Little Rock, AR
- North end: US 62 / US 412 in Ash Flat, AR

Location
- Country: United States
- States: Louisiana, Arkansas

Highway system
- United States Numbered Highway System; List; Special; Divided
| ← LA 166 | LA | → LA 168 |
| ← AR 166 | AR | → AR 168 |

U.S. Route 167 is a north-south United States Highway within the U.S. states of Louisiana and Arkansas. It runs for 500 miles (800 km) from Ash Flat, Arkansas at U.S. Route 62/U.S. Route 412 to Abbeville, Louisiana at Louisiana Highway 14. It goes through the cities of Little Rock, Arkansas, Alexandria, Louisiana, and Lafayette, Louisiana.

Some of the highway's route has been combined with or parallels Interstate 49 in Louisiana. Between Junction City, Arkansas, and Ruston, Louisiana, U.S. 167 runs concurrent with U.S. 63.

== Route description ==
=== Louisiana ===
U.S. Highway 167 in Louisiana runs 241.05 miles (387.93 km) in a north–south direction from the national southern terminus at Louisiana Highway 14 Business (LA 14 Bus.) in Abbeville to the Arkansas state line at Junction City.

The route cuts through the center of Louisiana for roughly its entire length and passes through two of the state's metropolitan areas, Lafayette and Alexandria. Between those cities, US 167 ranges in character from an urban freeway to a lightly traveled two-lane collector. During this stretch, it overlaps the southern 23 miles (37 km) of Interstate 49 (I-49) from Lafayette through Opelousas before making a diversion through rural Evangeline Parish to serve the small city of Ville Platte.

US 167 follows a combination of I-49 and the Pineville Expressway through Alexandria and Pineville, crossing the Red River via the twin-span Purple Heart Memorial Bridge. US 167 remains a surface four-lane highway through northern Louisiana and is the primary north–south route through Winnfield, Jonesboro, and Ruston. The northern portion of the route, beginning at the I-20 interchange in Ruston, also carries the first 35 miles (56 km) of US 63.

On its southern end, US 167 began near Colfax, Louisiana when designated as one of the original numbered U.S. Highways in 1926. However, the route was extended to Abbeville in 1949 over a number of existing state highways, more than doubling its length within Louisiana. Since that time, US 167 has experienced several alignment shifts as freeways were constructed in its two urban areas. More recently, all but approximately 40 miles (64 km) of the route was widened to four lanes as part of the Louisiana Department of Transportation and Development (La DOTD) TIMED program.

==== Abbeville to Lafayette ====
From the south, US 167 begins at an intersection with LA 14 Bus. (Port Street) in the Vermilion Parish city of Abbeville, located in southern Louisiana. The route heads north on Park Avenue, an undivided four-lane thoroughfare, and crosses mainline LA 14 (West Summers Drive). US 167 travels due north from Abbeville and becomes a divided four-lane highway on a wide right-of-way upon entering rural surroundings. The highway will repeat this pattern throughout the majority of its distance in Louisiana. Passing through Maurice, US 167 has a brief concurrency with LA 92. The highway then curves to the northeast and crosses into Lafayette Parish.

US 167 enters the suburban outgrowth of Lafayette and crosses the city limits just beyond a junction with LA 733 (East Broussard Road). The highway, locally known as Johnston Street, becomes a busy commercial corridor near the Acadiana Mall and intersects several major thoroughfares on the southwest side of town, including LA 3073 (Ambassador Caffery Parkway).

Prior to 2022, US 167 passed the University of Louisiana at Lafayette, located at a junction with US 90 Bus./LA 182 (University Avenue) and turned northwest onto the Evangeline Thruway, a one-way pair, and overlapped US 90 for about ten blocks. That year, US 167 was rerouted onto North College Road, Bertrand Drive, and the northernmost section of Ambassador Caffery Parkway, where it intersects US 90 before intersecting I-10. The highway then runs concurrently with I-10 for approximately three miles before reaching a cloverleaf interchange with I-49 at exit 103. This interchange also marks the end of the I-10 concurrence as well as the southern terminus of I-49. The portion of the Evangeline Thruway between US 90 and I-10 previously signed as US 167 is now signed as LA 182. In 2025, US 167 in Lafayette was again rerouted from the intersection of Johnston Street and Ambassador Caffery Parkway, where it follows Ambassador Caffery all the way to I-10.

==== I-49 concurrency and rural two-lane ====
US 167 utilizes the alignment of I-49 for the next 23 miles (37 km). The freeway initially carries six lanes of traffic but quickly narrows to four through lanes. The highway crosses from Lafayette into Carencro at exit 2, which connects to LA 98 (Gloria Switch Road). Carencro proper is served by exit 4, connecting with LA 726. North of Carencro, I-49/US 167 intersects the parallel LA 182 before crossing into St. Landry Parish.

In St. Landry Parish, the freeway cuts through the adjacent communities of Sunset and Grand Coteau, served by exit 11 to LA 93. Further north, the route skirts the eastern edge of the city of Opelousas, which is accessed by exit 18 to LA 31 (Creswell Lane) and exit 19 to US 190. US 167 departs from the alignment of I-49 at the next exit and heads west through a point known as Nuba and a junction with LA 10 and LA 182.

Narrowing to an undivided two-lane highway, US 167 travels northwest, overlapping LA 10 into Evangeline Parish. Here, the highway enters the city of Ville Platte and diverges onto the one-way pair of LaSalle and Main Streets through the center of town. During this stretch, US 167 intersects and briefly overlaps LA 29. After narrowing to two lanes again, US 167 turns due north at the western edge of Ville Platte and separates from LA 10. The highway passes to the east of Millers Lake and through an area known as Bayou Chicot, where it intersects LA 106. A few miles later, US 167 reaches a T-intersection with LA 13 in Turkey Creek. US 167 turns north to continue the path of LA 13 and travels several miles through a very sparsely populated area.

==== Alexandria metropolitan area ====
US 167 crosses into Rapides Parish just north of Clearwater and crosses under I-49 at exit 61. Soon afterward, it reaches a T-intersection with US 71 near Meeker and departs from the last stretch of two-lane pavement along its route. US 167 turns northwest and follows the alignment of US 71 alongside the Union Pacific Railroad (UP) line for the next 13 miles (21 km) through Lecompte, Lamourie, and Chambers. In Chambers, the highway passes the Louisiana State University at Alexandria, located about four miles (6.4 km) south of the Alexandria city limits.

Upon entering Alexandria, the principal city of central Louisiana, US 71 and US 167 engage into an interchange with I-49 at exit 80. (This interchange is also exit 63 on US 71.) US 167 takes the entrance ramp to begin another concurrency with I-49, while US 71 proceeds straight ahead onto MacArthur Drive co-signed as US 167 Bus. This time, the freeway begins with four through lanes and widens to six lanes further into town. On the edge of the business district, US 167 departs from I-49 a final time via exit 84 and transitions onto the Pineville Expressway joined with LA 28. As the highway elevates to begin the approach onto the Red River bridge, ramps connect to LA 1 and LA 28 Bus. via the grade-level one-way pair of Casson and Fulton Streets. This interchange also reconnects US 167 Bus. to the parent route, though it is not signed here. US 167 proceeds over the six-lane twin-span Purple Heart Memorial Bridge and crosses from Alexandria into the smaller adjacent city of Pineville.

US 167 is predominantly a grade-level four-lane freeway through the Pineville area with exits that do not utilize a numbering scheme. Tight diamond interchanges connect with LA 1250 (Shamrock Street) to Downtown Pineville and LA 107 toward Marksville. LA 28 departs to the east toward Jonesville at the next exit. US 167 curves northwest on the Pineville Expressway through Kingsville and intersects US 165, the main route connecting Alexandria with Monroe. Shortly afterward, in the community of Tioga, US 167 joins US 71 again briefly until the latter splits off toward Shreveport. Just before crossing into Grant Parish, the freeway ends as US 167 intersects LA 3225 at Creola.

==== North Louisiana ====
US 167 enters the Kisatchie National Forest at Prospect and remains within its boundaries throughout Grant Parish and into Winn Parish. Notable junctions along this stretch include LA 8 at Bentley, LA 123 in Dry Prong, and LA 500 at Packton. About nine miles (14 km) north of Packton, US 167 curves due west onto East Lafayette Street in the town of Winnfield. The route overlaps US 84 and LA 34 through the center of town, where it crosses over the Canadian Pacific Kansas City (CPKC) railway line and transitions onto West Court Street. With the other highways departing to the south and west, US 167 resumes its northerly course out of Winnfield, passing through Dodson and into Jackson Parish.

US 167 follows the CPKC into the town of Jonesboro, where it travels along Old Winnsboro Road. After beginning a concurrency with LA 147, US 167 intersects LA 4 (East Main Street) in the center of town. Just north of Jonesboro, US 167 passes through the adjacent communities of Hodge and North Hodge, where LA 147 turns off to the northwest. US 167 winds its way through Quitman, Ansley, and Clay before crossing into Lincoln Parish.

In Lincoln Parish, US 167 proceeds north into the city of Ruston and diverges onto the one-way pair of Vienna and Trenton Streets. The route overlaps US 80 for nine blocks and also begins a longer concurrency with LA 146 at California Avenue. Heading out of the business district, US 167 passes through an interchange with I-20, connecting with Shreveport to the west and Monroe to the east. This interchange also marks the southern terminus of US 63, and the two highways will remain paired throughout the remainder of their distance in Louisiana. North of Ruston, the rural surroundings return once again. While passing through Vienna, LA 146 departs to the west. US 167 proceeds through Unionville and Dubach before crossing into Union Parish.

In Union Parish, the highway enters Bernice, where it follows another one-way pair (Cherry and Plum Streets). In this small town, LA 2 Alt. utilizes the alignment of US 167 to reconnect to its parent route, LA 2. In Lillie, US 167 intersects the northern terminus of LA 15 just west of Spearsville. The route then curves northwest toward Junction City, located on the Arkansas state line. US 167 follows Main Street through town and intersects LA 9 (West Fifth Street). At 3rd Street, the highway crosses the state line into Junction City, Arkansas and proceeds northward co-signed with US 63 toward El Dorado.

==== Route classification and data ====
US 167 has several different functional classifications over the course of its route, as determined by the Louisiana Department of Transportation and Development (La DOTD). The route is classified as an urban principal arterial through most of the cities it serves. Outside of town, the majority of the route serves as a rural minor arterial south of Alexandria and as a rural principal arterial northward. Two notable exceptions are the portions running concurrent with I-49, which are classified as urban and rural interstates, and the portion between Ville Platte and Turkey Creek, which is a rural major collector. Daily traffic volume in 2013 peaked at 53,500 vehicles in Lafayette and 56,100 in Alexandria, both along concurrencies with I-49. The lowest count reported was 1,110 vehicles north of Turkey Creek.

Several pieces of the southern half of US 167 are included in the state-designated system of tourist routes known as the Louisiana Scenic Byways. The portion between Abbeville and Lafayette is part of the Jean Lafitte Scenic Byway, and much of the route through Evangeline Parish is part of the Zydeco Cajun Prairie Scenic Byway.

=== Arkansas ===
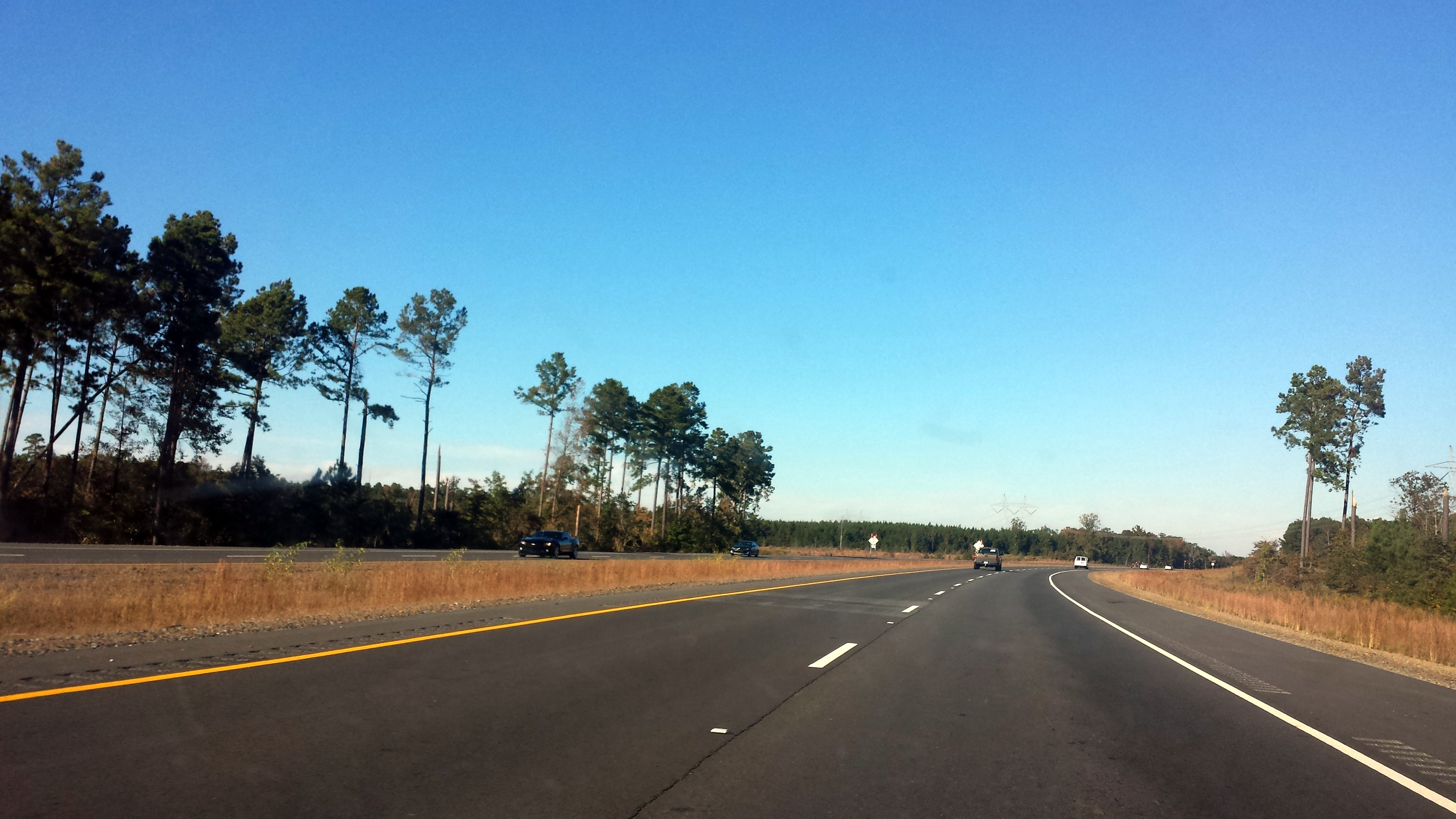
US 167 in Sheridan

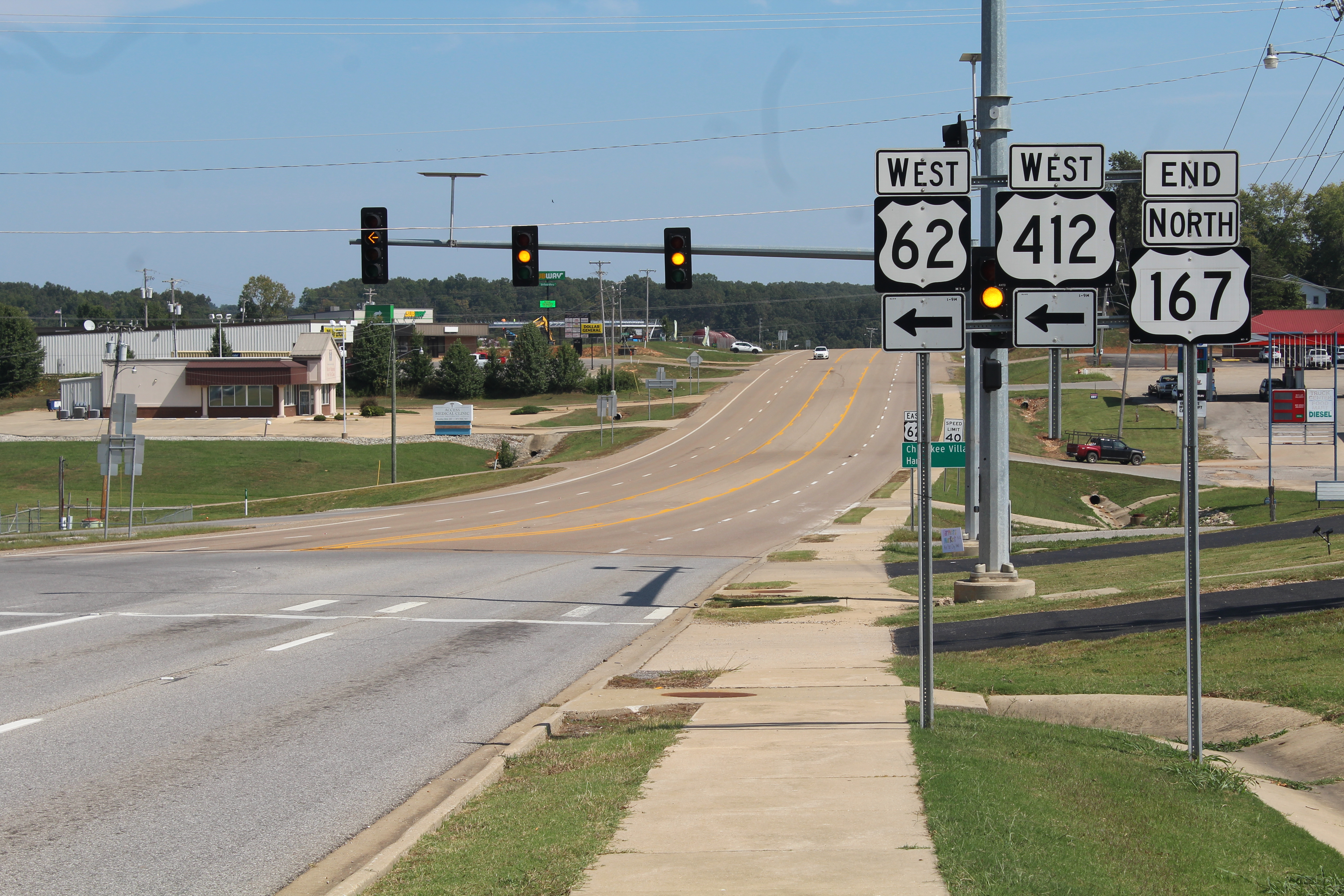
Northern terminus of US 167 in Ash Flat, AR

Highway 167 enters Arkansas at Junction City, a twin city with Junction City, Louisiana. Entering the state, Highway 167 is paired with U.S. Highway 63. The highways runs northeast through rural Union County to a junction with Highway 7 near the historic Joel Smith House. The three highways begin a concurrency intersect U.S. Highway 82 shortly after entering El Dorado. North of this junction is a grade-separated intersection with U.S. Highway 82B and U.S. Highway 167B, leading into downtown El Dorado and the El Dorado Commercial Historic District. The next intersection is with Main Street and is also grade-separated. Highway 63 breaks from the aforementioned concurrency to the east toward Warren. Following an interchange with Champagnolle Road, Highway 167 ends its overlap with Highway 7 by exiting the freeway and heading north toward Calion. This intersection also serves as the northern terminus for Highway 167B, with Highway 7 continuing north toward Smackover. Highway 167 runs north through sparsely populated parts of southern Calhoun County prior to entering Hampton, the county seat. The highway intersects U.S. Highway 278 (Main Street) and passes by the historic Calhoun County Courthouse and the Hampton Waterworks, both listed on the National Register of Historic Places. In the northern part of the county, Highway 167 meets another of its three business routes in the state, which runs into downtown Thornton. Highway 167 continues northeast to a junction with U.S. Highway 79, and the two routes begin a concurrency toward Fordyce.

== History ==
=== Original southern terminus and extensions ===
US 167 was designated in November 1926 as one of the original routes of the numbered U.S. Highway system. At that time, it was a much shorter route with a southern terminus at US 71 between Aloha and Colfax, northwest of Alexandria. The entire route within Louisiana followed an auto trail organized in 1919 known as the Pershing Way. Like the more well-known and established Jefferson Highway, the Pershing Way was promoted as an international highway stretching from New Orleans to Winnipeg, Manitoba, Canada. However, the two followed entirely different routes through Louisiana that intersected in Alexandria. While the Jefferson Highway traveled diagonally across the state, the Pershing Way made an "L" by heading west from New Orleans to Lafayette via the Old Spanish Trail (another auto trail and the predecessor of US 90) before turning north and cutting through the center of the state. When Louisiana implemented a numbering system for its state highways in 1921, the Pershing Way was designated as State Route 5. Once the state began signposting its U.S. Highways in 1928, they remained co-signed with their respective state designations until a renumbering of the system in 1955 eliminated such concurrencies.

Since its creation in 1926, the southern terminus of US 167 has been moved twice. In 1932, the highway was shifted south of Winnfield to follow State Route 99, an early addition to the state highway system that had recently been paved. This change took the highway through Dry Prong to a different junction with US 71 near Creola, slightly extending the route and allowing a more direct connection with Alexandria. The original alignment was a gravel route that followed what is now LA 471 through Verda to Atlanta and LA 34 from Atlanta to Winnfield.

US 167 assumed its full length in Louisiana in 1949, when the designation was extended over existing highways southward to Abbeville. State Route 43 carried the highway from Abbeville to Lafayette with the old Pershing Way (Route 5) taking it from there as far as Nuba, a point between Opelousas and Washington. The remainder of the distance to Alexandria was primarily composed of State Route 22 to Ville Platte, State Route 23 to Bayou Chicot, State Route 218 to Turkey Creek, State Route 26 to Meeker, and the concurrent US 71/State Route 1 into the city.

=== Early routings and special routes in Alexandria and Lafayette ===
In Alexandria, US 167 initially followed a path similar to its current business route and that of US 165. I-49 and the Pineville Expressway did not yet exist, and the primary through-town route followed MacArthur Drive, Lee Street, Bolton Avenue, and Murray Street into the downtown area. The highway crossed the Red River via the Murray Street Bridge, now demolished and replaced with the parallel Jackson Street Bridge. It continued through Pineville on Main Street, Military Highway, and Jefferson Highway to the modern junction of US 71 and US 165. The route then followed US 71 to Tioga and LA 3225 to Creola.

Shortly after its extension through Alexandria, a bypass route for US 167 was designated that followed MacArthur Drive (then known as the Alexandria Bypass) around the city and across the O.K. Allen Bridge upriver. Portions of this route were part of the existing US 71 Byp. and a new US 165 Byp. By 1953, mainline US 167 was routed over the O.K. Allen Bridge via Bolton Avenue, and the bypass was truncated to the intersection of Bolton Avenue and MacArthur Drive, which was a traffic circle at that time. This routing remained in effect until the early 1960s when US 167 was moved out of Downtown Alexandria altogether and absorbed the bypass route, which was then deleted.

In Lafayette, the route's other urbanized area, US 167 followed Johnston Street into town as it does today. However, it originally turned north onto University Avenue (then known as College Avenue) across US 90 and followed the present route of LA 182 through Carencro, Sunset, and Opelousas. The portion along University Avenue between Johnston and Cameron Streets in Lafayette was concurrent with US 90, as the Evangeline Thruway did not yet exist. Over the years, US 90 was shifted back-and-forth from its original routing through the courthouse square (with University Avenue signed as a bypass route) to the University Avenue alignment (with the courthouse alignment signed as a business route). During one short period in the mid-1950s when the former configuration was in effect, mainline US 167 was also routed through the courthouse square with a bypass route designated along University Avenue. The courthouse square route was as follows: Johnston Street, Jefferson Street, Main Street, St. John Street, and Cameron Street to University Avenue.

== Major intersections ==
| State | County or Parish | Location | mi | km | Exit | Destinations | Notes |
|---|---|---|---|---|---|---|---|
| Louisiana | Vermilion | Abbeville | 0.000 | 0.000 | | LA 14 Bus. (West Port Street) | Southern terminus |
| Louisiana | Vermilion | Abbeville | 0.597 | 0.961 | | LA 14 (West Summers Drive) – Kaplan, New Iberia | |
| Louisiana | Vermilion | | 3.542 | 5.700 | | LA 696 west – Meaux | Eastern terminus of LA 696 |
| Louisiana | Vermilion | | 5.057 | 8.138 | | LA 697 west | Eastern terminus of LA 697 |
| Louisiana | Vermilion | | 7.566 | 12.176 | | LA 699 west – Leroy | Eastern terminus of LA 699 |
| Louisiana | Vermilion | Maurice | 9.160 | 14.742 | | LA 92 east (Milton Road) – Milton | Southern end of LA 92 concurrency |
| Louisiana | Vermilion | Maurice | 9.576 | 15.411 | | LA 92 west (West Lafayette Street) – Indian Bayou, Crowley | Northern end of LA 92 concurrency |
| Louisiana | Lafayette | | 13.085 | 21.058 | | LA 733 (East Broussard Road) | Western terminus of LA 733 |
| Louisiana | Lafayette | Lafayette | 14.349– 14.360 | 23.092– 23.110 | | LA 724 (Duhon Road) | Southern terminus of LA 724 |
| Louisiana | Lafayette | Lafayette | 15.279– 15.428 | 24.589– 24.829 | | LA 3073 (Ambassador Caffery Parkway) | Western terminus of LA 3073 |
| Louisiana | Lafayette | Lafayette | 18.223 | 29.327 | | LA 3025 Spur (Bertrand Drive) | Southern terminus of LA 3025 Spur |
| Louisiana | Lafayette | Lafayette | 18.400 | 29.612 | | LA 3025 (College Road) | |
| Louisiana | Lafayette | Lafayette | 19.773 | 31.822 | | US 90 Bus. / LA 182 (University Avenue) – Crowley | |
| Louisiana | Lafayette | Lafayette | 20.594– 20.651 | 33.143– 33.235 | | US 90 east (Evangeline Thruway) / LA 94 east (Louisiana Avenue) – New Iberia, Breaux Bridge | Western terminus of LA 94; southern end of US 90 concurrency; future southern end of I-49 concurrency |
| Louisiana | Lafayette | Lafayette | 21.397 | 34.435 | | LA 176 north (Jefferson Boulevard) | Southern terminus of LA 176 |
| Louisiana | Lafayette | Lafayette | 21.721 | 34.957 | | US 90 west (Mudd Avenue) – Scott | Northern end of US 90 concurrency |
| Louisiana | Lafayette | Lafayette | 23.251– 23.927 | 37.419– 38.507 | 1 | I-10 – Baton Rouge, Lake Charles I-49 begins | Current southern terminus of I-49; signed as exits 1A (east) and 1B (west); exit 103 on I-10; cloverleaf interchange |
| Louisiana | Lafayette | Lafayette | 24.176– 24.935 | 38.908– 40.129 | 1C | Pont Des Mouton Road | |
| Louisiana | see I-49 | | | | | | |
| Louisiana | St. Landry | | 46.516– 46.988 | 74.860– 75.620 | 23 | I-49 north – Alexandria LA 744 east | Western terminus of LA 744; northern end of I-49 concurrency |
| Louisiana | St. Landry | Nuba | 48.125– 48.197 | 77.450– 77.566 | | LA 10 east / LA 182 – Washington, Lebeau | Southern end of LA 10 concurrency |
| Louisiana | St. Landry | | 49.652– 49.725 | 79.907– 80.025 | | LA 749 | Northern terminus of LA 749 |
| Louisiana | St. Landry | | 54.750 | 88.112 | | LA 103 west (Prairie Ronde Highway) – Prairie Ronde, Lawtell | Southern end of LA 103 concurrency |
| Louisiana | St. Landry | | 56.191 | 90.431 | | LA 103 east (Grand Prairie Highway) – Grand Prairie, Washington | Northern end of LA 103 concurrency |
| Louisiana | Evangeline | | 59.870– 59.917 | 96.351– 96.427 | | LA 748 (Grand Prairie Road) – Grand Prairie, Washington | Western terminus of LA 748 |
| Louisiana | Evangeline | Ville Platte | 61.141 | 98.397 | | LA 1168 (Belaire Cove Road) – Belair Cove | Northern terminus of LA 1168 |
| Louisiana | Evangeline | Ville Platte | 62.247 | 100.177 | | LA 29 north (Tate Cove Road) – Bunkie | Southern end of LA 29 concurrency |
| Louisiana | Evangeline | Ville Platte | 62.635 | 100.801 | | LA 29 south (South Chataignier Street) – Eunice | Northern end of LA 29 concurrency |
| Louisiana | Evangeline | Ville Platte | 63.401 | 102.034 | | LA 3042 (North Dupre Street) | Southern terminus of LA 3042 |
| Louisiana | Evangeline | Ville Platte | 65.076 | 104.730 | | LA 3097 (Snooks Road) | Northern terminus of LA 3097 |
| Louisiana | Evangeline | Ville Platte | 65.176 | 104.891 | | LA 10 west (Vidrine Road) – Oakdale | Northern end of LA 10 concurrency |
| Louisiana | Evangeline | | 66.690– 66.750 | 107.327– 107.424 | | LA 376 (Millers Lake Road) | Eastern terminus of LA 376 |
| Louisiana | Evangeline | Bayou Chicot | 73.978 | 119.056 | | LA 106 (St. Landry Highway) – Pine Prairie | To Chicot State Park |
| Louisiana | Evangeline | | 77.873 | 125.324 | | LA 3096 (Junction Road) | Northern terminus of LA 3096 |
| Louisiana | Evangeline | Turkey Creek | 79.712– 79.737 | 128.284– 128.324 | | LA 13 south (Veterans Memorial Highway) – Eunice | Northern terminus of LA 13 |
| Louisiana | Rapides | | 89.861– 90.074 | 144.617– 144.960 | | I-49 – Alexandria, Opelousas | Exit 61 on I-49 |
| Louisiana | Rapides | | 92.446 | 148.777 | | LA 456 | |
| Louisiana | Rapides | | 92.699 | 149.185 | | US 71 south – Bunkie | Southern end of US 71 concurrency |
| Louisiana | Rapides | Lecompte | 95.012 | 152.907 | | LA 457 east – Latanier | Western terminus of LA 457 |
| Louisiana | Rapides | Lecompte | 95.625 | 153.894 | | LA 112 west (Wall Street) to I-49 – Forest Hill, Leesville | Eastern terminus of LA 112 |
| Louisiana | Rapides | Lamourie | 98.662 | 158.781 | | LA 470 | Southern terminus of LA 470 |
| Louisiana | Rapides | Chambers | 101.918 | 164.021 | | LA 470 | Northern terminus of LA 470 |
| Louisiana | Rapides | Chambers | 102.363 | 164.737 | | LA 3170 | Western terminus of LA 3170 |
| Louisiana | Rapides | | 105.608 | 169.960 | | To LA 1208-4 (Frontage Road) | Signed as LA 1208-1 (pre-2010 designation) |
| Louisiana | Rapides | Alexandria | 105.808– 107.102 | 170.281– 172.364 | 80 | I-49 south – Opelousas US 71 north / US 167 Bus. north (MacArthur Drive) US 71 Byp. begins | Southern terminus of US 167 Bus.; northern end of US 71 concurrency; southern end of I-49/US 71 Byp. concurrency |
| Louisiana | Rapides | Alexandria | 107.800– 107.839 | 173.487– 173.550 | 81 | LA 3250 (Sugarhouse Road) to US 71 north (MacArthur Drive) | Southbound exit and northbound entrance |
| Louisiana | Rapides | Alexandria | 109.227– 110.053 | 175.784– 177.113 | 83 | Broadway Avenue | |
| Louisiana | Rapides | Alexandria | 110.334– 111.292 | 177.565– 179.107 | 84 | I-49 north / US 71 Byp. north / LA 28 west – Shreveport | Northern end of I-49/US 71 Byp. concurrency |
| Louisiana | Rapides | Alexandria | 111.492– 111.572 | 179.429– 179.558 | | US 167 Bus. south / LA 1 west / LA 28 Bus. – Downtown Alexandria | Northern terminus of US 167 Bus.; eastern terminus of LA 28 Bus.; southern end of LA 28 concurrency; US 167 Bus. not signed northbound |
| Louisiana | Rapides | Alexandria–Pineville line | 111.604– 111.761 | 179.609– 179.862 | Purple Heart Memorial Bridge over Red River | | |
| Louisiana | Rapides | Pineville | 111.861– 112.388 | 180.023– 180.871 | | LA 1250 (Shamrock Street) – Downtown Pineville | Via LA 1250 Spur; southern terminus of LA 1250 Spur |
| Louisiana | Rapides | Pineville | 112.804– 113.005 | 181.540– 181.864 | | LA 107 – Marksville; LA 1250 (Shamrock Street) | Northern terminus of LA 107; eastern terminus of LA 1250 |
| Louisiana | Rapides | Pineville | 113.533– 114.049 | 182.714– 183.544 | | LA 28 east – Jonesville; LA 3100 – Pineville | Northern end of LA 28 concurrency |
| Louisiana | Rapides | Pineville | 114.810– 115.380 | 184.769– 185.686 | | LA 3144 (Edgewood Drive) | Northern terminus of LA 3144 |
| Louisiana | Rapides | Pineville | 115.445– 116.000 | 185.791– 186.684 | | US 165 – Alexandria, Monroe | Location also known as Kingsville |
| Louisiana | Rapides | Tioga | 117.324– 117.786 | 188.815– 189.558 | | US 71 south – Alexandria LA 3225 north – Tioga | Southern terminus of LA 3225; southern end of US 71 concurrency |
| Louisiana | Rapides | Tioga | 120.443– 120.454 | 193.834– 193.852 | | US 71 north – Shreveport | Northern end of US 71 concurrency |
| Louisiana | Rapides | Creola | 121.135– 121.214 | 194.948– 195.075 | | LA 3225 | Northern end of freeway |
| Louisiana | Grant | Prospect | 123.589 | 198.897 | | LA 1241 west | Eastern terminus of LA 1241 |
| Louisiana | Grant | Bentley | 128.087 | 206.136 | | LA 8 – Pollock, Colfax | |
| Louisiana | Grant | Dry Prong | 133.424 | 214.725 | | LA 123 – Breezy Hill, Colfax | |
| Louisiana | Grant | Williana | 139.772 | 224.941 | | LA 472 east | Southern terminus of LA 472 |
| Louisiana | Grant | Packton | 148.528 | 239.033 | | LA 500 east – Georgetown, Jena | Western terminus of LA 500 |
| Louisiana | Winn | | 154.470 | 248.595 | | LA 472 | Northern terminus of LA 472 |
| Louisiana | Winn | | 158.092 | 254.424 | | US 84 east / LA 34 east (East Boundary Avenue) – Tullos, Olla, Monroe | Southern end of US 84 and LA 34 concurrencies |
| Louisiana | Winn | Winnfield | 157.758 | 253.887 | | LA 1231-1 south / LA 1231-2 north (South Grove Street) | Northern terminus of LA 1231-1; southern terminus of LA 1231-2 |
| Louisiana | Winn | Winnfield | 159.109 | 256.061 | | LA 34 west (South Jones Street) – Atlanta | Northern end of LA 34 concurrency |
| Louisiana | Winn | Winnfield | 159.786– 159.849 | 257.151– 257.252 | | US 84 west (Natchitoches Highway) – Clarence | Northern end of US 84 concurrency |
| Louisiana | Winn | Winnfield | 161.037 | 259.164 | | LA 501 north | Southern terminus of LA 501 |
| Louisiana | Winn | | 162.001 | 260.715 | | LA 156 west – Calvin, Goldonna | Eastern terminus of LA 156 |
| Louisiana | Winn | | 162.767 | 261.948 | | LA 1231-2 south | Northern terminus of LA 1231-2 |
| Louisiana | Winn | Tannehill | 164.926 | 265.423 | | LA 505 north | Southern terminus of LA 505 |
| Louisiana | Winn | | 169.530 | 272.832 | | LA 1236 | Western terminus of LA 1236 |
| Louisiana | Winn | Dodson | 170.674 | 274.673 | | LA 126 (Stovall Street) – Sikes, Readhimer | |
| Louisiana | Jackson | Wyatt | 176.700 | 284.371 | | LA 505 | |
| Louisiana | Jackson | Jonesboro | 181.606 | 292.267 | | LA 1255 (South Hudson Avenue) | Southern terminus of LA 1255 |
| Louisiana | Jackson | Jonesboro | 182.105 | 293.070 | | LA 147 south (Walker Road) | Southern end of LA 147 concurrency |
| Louisiana | Jackson | Jonesboro | 182.633 | 293.919 | | LA 4 (East Main Street) – Caney Lake | |
| Louisiana | Jackson | Jonesboro | 183.735 | 295.693 | | LA 542 east (Beech Springs Road) | Western terminus of LA 542 |
| Louisiana | Jackson | Hodge | 184.909 | 297.582 | | LA 813-3 (East Pine Street) | Western terminus of LA 813-3 |
| Louisiana | Jackson | Hodge–North Hodge line | 185.554 | 298.620 | | LA 147 north (Arcadia Highway) – Arcadia, Minden | Northern end of LA 147 concurrency |
| Louisiana | Jackson | North Hodge | 186.616 | 300.329 | | LA 811 (Quitman Highway) | Western terminus of LA 811 |
| Louisiana | Jackson | Quitman | 190.626 | 306.783 | | LA 155 east (Quitman Highway) | Southern end of LA 155 concurrency |
| Louisiana | Jackson | Quitman | 190.941 | 307.290 | | LA 155 west (Quitman Highway) | Northern end of LA 155 concurrency |
| Louisiana | Jackson | Clay | 197.443 | 317.754 | | LA 148 east / LA 818 north | Western terminus of LA 148; southern terminus of LA 818 |
| Louisiana | Lincoln | Ruston | 202.642 | 326.121 | | LA 3061 (Tennessee Avenue) | |
| Louisiana | Lincoln | Ruston | 204.534 | 329.166 | | US 80 west (West California Avenue) LA 146 east (East California Avenue) | Southern end of US 80 and LA 146 concurrencies; to Louisiana Tech University |
| Louisiana | Lincoln | Ruston | 204.999 | 329.914 | | LA 150 west (West Alabama Avenue) | Eastern terminus of LA 150 |
| Louisiana | Lincoln | Ruston | 205.144 | 330.147 | | US 80 east (East Georgia Avenue) | Northern end of US 80 concurrency |
| Louisiana | Lincoln | Ruston | 205.665– 205.834 | 330.986– 331.258 | | I-20 – Monroe, Shreveport US 63 begins | Southern terminus of US 63; exit 85 on I-20 |
| Louisiana | Lincoln | Vienna | 209.376 | 336.958 | | LA 146 west / LA 3072 east – Homer | Western terminus of LA 3072; northern end of LA 146 concurrency; to Lake Claiborne State Park |
| Louisiana | Lincoln | | 214.158 | 344.654 | | LA 822 west | Southern end of LA 822 concurrency |
| Louisiana | Lincoln | Unionville | 215.160 | 346.266 | | LA 822 east | Northern end of LA 822 concurrency |
| Louisiana | Lincoln | Dubach | 217.368 | 349.820 | | LA 151 east (Annie Lee Street) – Farmerville, Downsville | Southern end of LA 151 concurrency |
| Louisiana | Lincoln | Dubach | 217.515 | 350.056 | | LA 151 west (Hico Street) – Arcadia, Homer; LA 824-3 (East Hico Street) | Western terminus of LA 824-3; northern end of LA 151 concurrency |
| Louisiana | Lincoln | Dubach | 217.591 | 350.179 | | LA 824-2 (Wynn Street) | Western terminus of LA 824-2 |
| Louisiana | Lincoln | | 220.018 | 354.085 | | LA 545 – Hico, Downsville | |
| Louisiana | Union | Bernice | 225.829 | 363.437 | | LA 2 west (8th Street) – Homer | Southern end of LA 2 concurrency |
| Louisiana | Union | Bernice | 226.144 | 363.943 | | LA 2 east (East 4th Street) – Farmerville LA 2 Alt. | Eastern terminus of LA 2 Alt.; northern end of LA 2 concurrency; southern end of LA 2 Alt. concurrency; to Lake D'Arbonne State Park |
| Louisiana | Union | Bernice | 227.201 | 365.645 | | LA 2 Alt. west (Summerfield Highway) – Haynesville | Northern end of LA 2 Alt. concurrency |
| Louisiana | Union | Lillie | 233.060 | 375.074 | | LA 15 – Spearsville, Farmerville | Northern terminus of LA 15 |
| Louisiana | Union | Junction City | 240.895 | 387.683 | | LA 9 south (West Fifth Street) – Homer, Shreveport | Northern terminus of LA 9 |
| | | | 241.046– 0.000 | 387.926– 0.000 | Louisiana–Arkansas state line | | |
| Arkansas | Union | | 10.331 | 16.626 | | AR 7 south – Lockhart, LA | southern end of AR 7 concurrency |
| Arkansas | Union | El Dorado | 14.017 | 22.558 | | US 82 / AR 15 south – Magnolia, Crossett, South Arkansas Regional Airport | Interchange; US 82 exit 22 |
| Arkansas | Union | El Dorado | 14.790 | 23.802 | 15 | US 82B / US 167B north (Hillsboro Street) | interchange; southern end of freeway section |
| Arkansas | Union | El Dorado | 16.011 | 25.767 | 16 | US 63 north – Warren | northern end of US 63 concurrency |
| Arkansas | Union | | 17.146 | 27.594 | 17 | Champagnolle Road | |
| Arkansas | Union | | 19.015 | 30.602 | 19 | US 167B south / AR 7 north – Camden, El Dorado Business District | Northern end of freeway section; northern end of AR 7 concurrency |
| Arkansas | Union | | 24.711 | 39.768 | | AR 335 south – Norphlet | |
| Arkansas | Calhoun | | 36.969 | 59.496 | | AR 172 east to AR 160 | |
| Arkansas | Calhoun | Hampton | 42.872 | 68.996 | | US 278 (Main Street) – Camden, Warren | |
| Arkansas | Calhoun | | | | | AR 274 west | |
| Arkansas | Calhoun | | | | | US 167B north to US 79 south – Thornton, Camden | |
| Arkansas | Calhoun | | | | | US 79 south – Camden | interchange; southbound exit and northbound entrance; southern end of US 79 concurrency |
| Arkansas | Dallas | Fordyce | | | | US 79B north / AR 273 south – Fordyce Business District, Historic District | |
| Arkansas | Dallas | Fordyce | | | | AR 8 – Princeton, Fordyce, Tri-County Lake | |
| Arkansas | Dallas | Fordyce | | | | US 79 north / US 79B south – Pine Bluff, Fordyce | Northern end of US 79 concurrency |
| Arkansas | Dallas | | | | | AR 273 north to AR 229 | |
| Arkansas | Cleveland | No major junctions | | | | | |
| Arkansas | Dallas | Farindale | | | | AR 48 west – Carthage | |
| Arkansas | Grant | Cross Roads | | | | AR 35 south – Rison | |
| Arkansas | Grant | | | | | US 167B north – Sheridan | |
| Arkansas | Grant | Sheridan | | | | AR 46 | |
| Arkansas | Grant | Sheridan | | | | US 270 | |
| Arkansas | Grant | | | | | AR 35 | |
| Arkansas | Grant | | | | | US 167B south – Sheridan | |
| Arkansas | Saline | | | | | AR 367 north – East End | Former routing of US 167 |
| Arkansas | Saline | | | | 10 | I-530 south / US 65 south – Pine Bluff | Southern end of I-530/US 65 concurrency; no southbound entrance |
| Arkansas | see I-530 | | | | | | |
| Arkansas | Pulaski | Little Rock | | | 1 (NB); 138 (SB) | I-30 west (US 67 south) / I-440 east – Hot Springs, Texarkana, Airport, Memphis I-530 ends | Signed as exits 1B (west) and 1A (east) northbound; southern end of I-30/US 67 concurrency; northern terminus of I-530 |
| Arkansas | see I-30 and I-57 | | | | | | |
| Arkansas | White | Bald Knob | | | 55 | I-57 north / US 64 east / US 67 north – Newport, St. Louis, Augusta, McCrory, Memphis | Northern end of I-57/US 64/US 67 concurrency |
| Arkansas | White | Bald Knob | | | | AR 367 north | Former US 67 |
| Arkansas | White | Bald Knob | | | | AR 258 west | |
| Arkansas | Jackson | No major junctions | | | | | |
| Arkansas | White | | | | | AR 87 south – Denmark, Bradford | |
| Arkansas | Independence | Pleasant Plains | | | | AR 157 | |
| Arkansas | Independence | Southside | | | | AR 230 west / AR 14S east – Locust Grove, McHue, Newport | |
| Arkansas | Independence | Dennison Heights | | | | AR 14 / AR 25 south – Mountain View, Heber Springs, Newport | Southern end of AR 25 concurrency |
| Arkansas | Independence | Batesville | | | | AR 69 south / AR 69B north (East Harrison Street) – Business District | Southern end of AR 69 concurrency |
| Arkansas | Independence | Batesville | | | | AR 233 north (East Main Street) – Lyon College, Batesville Business District, Historical District | |
| Arkansas | Independence | Batesville | | | | AR 69 north (Barnett Drive) – Cushman, Melbourne | Northern end of AR 69 concurrency |
| Arkansas | Independence | Batesville | | | | AR 25 north / AR 69S north (White Drive) – Melbourne, Cord, U of A Community College at Batesville | Northern end of AR 25 concurrency |
| Arkansas | Independence | | | | | AR 233 south | |
| Arkansas | Independence | | | | | AR 394 east | |
| Arkansas | Sharp | Cave City | | | | AR 230 east | |
| Arkansas | Sharp | Cave City | | | | AR 58 east / AR 115 north – Poughkeepsie, Smithville | Southern end of AR 58 concurrency |
| Arkansas | Sharp | | | | | AR 58 west – Sidney | Northern end of AR 58 concurrency |
| Arkansas | Sharp | Evening Shade | | | | AR 56 east – Poughkeepsie | Southern end of AR 56 concurrency |
| Arkansas | Sharp | Ash Flat | | | | AR 56 west – Calico Rock, Norfork | Northern end of AR 56 concurrency |
| Arkansas | Sharp | Ash Flat | | | | AR 354 east to AR 58 | |
| Arkansas | Sharp | Ash Flat | | | | US 62 / US 412 (Ash Flat Drive) – Hardy, Salem, Mountain Home, Harrison | |
1.000 mi = 1.609 km; 1.000 km = 0.621 mi

== Bannered and suffixed routes ==
=== Alexandria business route ===
U.S. Highway 167 Business
- Location: Alexandria, Louisiana
- Length: 5.385 mi (8.666 km)
- Existed: 1994–present

U.S. Highway 167 Business (US 167 Bus.) runs 5.39 miles (8.67 km) in a north–south direction through the Rapides Parish city of Alexandria. It follows the former path of US 167 through town before it was shifted onto the newly completed I-49 in 1994.

From the south, US 167 Bus. begins at an interchange with I-49 (exit 80) and US 71 (exit 63) at the southern end of Alexandria. Mainline US 167 travels concurrently with I-49 to the north of the interchange and US 71 to the south. The business route heads northwest on MacArthur Drive, a divided four-lane highway with frontage roads, co-signed with US 71. It then turns northward onto Lee Street and becomes an undivided four-lane highway. After serving as a corridor for small commercial establishments for nearly two miles (3.2 km), US 167 Bus. cuts through a residential neighborhood via the one-way pair of Mason and Overton Streets. A dozen blocks later, the route reaches an intersection with Bringhurst Street. Here, US 167 Bus. proceeds straight ahead co-signed with LA 1 and LA 28 Bus.

The travel lanes converge as the highway immediately heads through an underpass of the Union Pacific Railroad (UP) line and crosses under both the elevated I-49 and Pineville Expressway (US 167/LA 28). For the next four blocks, US 167 Bus. diverges again onto the one-way pair of Casson and Fulton Streets near the southeast corner of the downtown area, effectively serving as frontage roads of the Pineville Expressway. Ramps connect to southbound I-49/US 167 and to the Pineville Expressway (northbound US 167 and eastbound LA 28) as the latter increases in elevation to cross the Red River via the twin-span Purple Heart Memorial Bridge into Pineville.

US 167 Bus. is classified as an urban principal arterial by the Louisiana Department of Transportation and Development (La DOTD). The average daily traffic volume in 2013 ranged from 7,300 to 24,400 vehicles with the highest counts recorded near the I-49 and US 167 interchanges at either end of the route. The posted speed limit is 50 mph (80 km/h) along MacArthur Drive, reduced to 35 mph (55 km/h) otherwise.

Major intersections
The entire highway is in Alexandria, Rapides Parish.

| mi | km | Destinations | Notes |
|---|---|---|---|
| 0.000– 0.185 | 0.000– 0.298 | I-49 south – Opelousas US 71 south / US 167 south (MacArthur Drive) | Southern terminus; southern end of US 71 concurrency; exit 80 on I-49 and exit 63 on US 71 |
| 0.686 | 1.104 | LA 3250 east (Sugar House Road) to I-49 north | Western terminus of LA 3250 |
| 1.545– 1.624 | 2.486– 2.614 | US 71 north (MacArthur Drive) – Shreveport | Northern end of US 71 concurrency |
| 4.578 | 7.368 | LA 1 north / LA 28 Bus. west (Bringhurst Street) – Leesville | Southern end of LA 1/LA 28 Bus. concurrency |
| 4.953– 4.967 | 7.971– 7.994 | To I-49 south / US 167 south – Opelousas | Exit 84 on I-49; northbound exit and southbound entrance |
| 5.080– 5.385 | 8.175– 8.666 | US 167 north / LA 28 east (Pineville Expressway) LA 1 south (Casson Street, Fulton Street) LA 28 Bus. | Northern terminus of US 167 Bus.; eastern terminus of LA 28 Bus.; northern end of LA 1/LA 28 Bus. concurrency |
1.000 mi = 1.609 km; 1.000 km = 0.621 mi: Concurrency terminus; Incomplete access

=== El Dorado business route ===
U.S. Highway 167B
- Location: El Dorado, Arkansas
- Length: 5.76 mi (9.27 km)
- Existed: August 25, 1971–present

US Highway 167 Business (US 167B and Hwy. 167B) is a 2.97-mile (4.78 km) business route of US Highway 167 in Union County, Arkansas.

=== Thornton business route ===
U.S. Highway 167B
- Location: Thornton, Arkansas
- Length: 1.67 mi (2.69 km)
- Existed: July 24, 1968–present

US Highway 167 Business (US 167B and Hwy. 167B) is a 1.67-mile (2.69 km) business route of US Highway 167 in Calhoun County, Arkansas. The route was created following the completion of a bypass around Thornton when Highway 167 was rerouted onto the new alignment.

=== Sheridan business route ===
U.S. Highway 167B
- Location: Sheridan, Arkansas
- Existed: September 11, 2013–present

US Highway 167 Business (US 167B and Hwy. 167B) is a 6.81-mile (10.96 km) business route of US Highway 167 in Grant County, Arkansas. It was created by the Arkansas State Highway Commission on September 11, 2013 following the designation of the new Highway 167 Sheridan bypass as mainline Highway 167, leaving the former alignment in the state highway system as a business route.

== See also ==
- Arkansas Highway 367
- Pineville Expressway
