= North Hodge, Louisiana =

- Village
- Location of North Hodge in Jackson Parish, Louisiana

- Location of Louisiana in the United States
- Coordinates: 32°17′04″N 92°43′02″W
- Country: United States
- State: Louisiana
- Parish: Jackson

Area
  - Total: 0.68 sq mi (1.77 km^{2})
  - Land: 0.68 sq mi (1.76 km^{2})
  - Water: 0.0077 sq mi (0.02 km^{2})
- Elevation: 167 ft (51 m)

Population (2020)
  - Total: 296
  - Density: 436.4/sq mi (168.51/km^{2})
- Time zone: UTC-6 (CST)
  - Summer (DST): UTC-5 (CDT)
- Area code: 318
- FIPS code: 22-55910
- GNIS feature ID: 2407512

North Hodge is a village in Jackson Parish, Louisiana, United States. As of the 2020 census, North Hodge had a population of 296. It is part of the Ruston Micropolitan Statistical Area.

== Geography ==
North Hodge is located in southwestern Jackson Parish. It is bordered to the southwest by Hodge and to the south by East Hodge. U.S. Route 167 passes through the village, leading north 5 miles (8 km) to Quitman and south through Hodge 3 miles (5 km) to Jonesboro, the parish seat.

According to the United States Census Bureau, North Hodge has a total area of 0.69 square miles (1.78 km^{2}), of which 0.68 square miles (1.76 km^{2}) are land and 0.0077 square miles (0.02 km^{2}), or 1.00%, are water.

== Demographics ==
Historical population
Census	Pop.	Note	%±
1960	680		—
1970	640		−5.9%
1980	573		−10.5%
1990	477		−16.8%
2000	436		−8.6%
2010	388		−11.0%
2020	296		−23.7%
2025 (est.)	309	▲	4.4%
U.S. Decennial Census

As of the census of 2000, there were 436 people, 172 households, and 116 families residing in the village. The population density was 647.8 inhabitants per square mile (250.1/km^{2}). There were 213 housing units at an average density of 316.5 per square mile (122.2/km^{2}). The racial makeup of the village was 80.50% White, 17.89% African American, 0.69% Native American, 0.69% Asian, and 0.23% from two or more races. Hispanic or Latino of any race were 0.23% of the population.

There were 172 households, out of which 36.6% had children under the age of 18 living there, 51.7% were married couples living together, 13.4% had a female householder with no husband present, and 32.0% were non-families. 26.2% of all households were made up of individuals, and 12.8% had someone living alone who was 65 years of age or older. The average household size was 2.53 and the average family size was 3.09.

In the village, the population was spread out, with 28.2% under the age of 18, 11.7% from 18 to 24, 27.5% from 25 to 44, 19.3% from 45 to 64, and 13.3% who were 65 years of age or older. The median age was 34 years. For every 100 females, there were 97.3 males. For every 100 females age 18 and over, there were 84.1 males.

The median income for a household in the village was $21,563, and the median income for a family was $27,083. Males had a median income of $28,625 versus $13,000 for females. The per capita income for the village was $10,934. About 26.3% of families and 28.5% of the population were below the poverty line, including 37.0% of those under age 18 and 16.1% of those age 65 or over.

== Current government ==
North Hodge is governed under provisions of the Lawrason Act.

The current mayor serving since 2015 is Kathy Robertson. Council members are Chasity Womack (since 2015), Ernest "Ernie" Roden, and Andrea Woods, since 2019. The chief of police is Robert "Bobby" Dillon.
