= Alexandria metropolitan area, Louisiana =

Greater Alexandria
- Metropolitan statistical area
- Alexandria, LA metropolitan statistical area
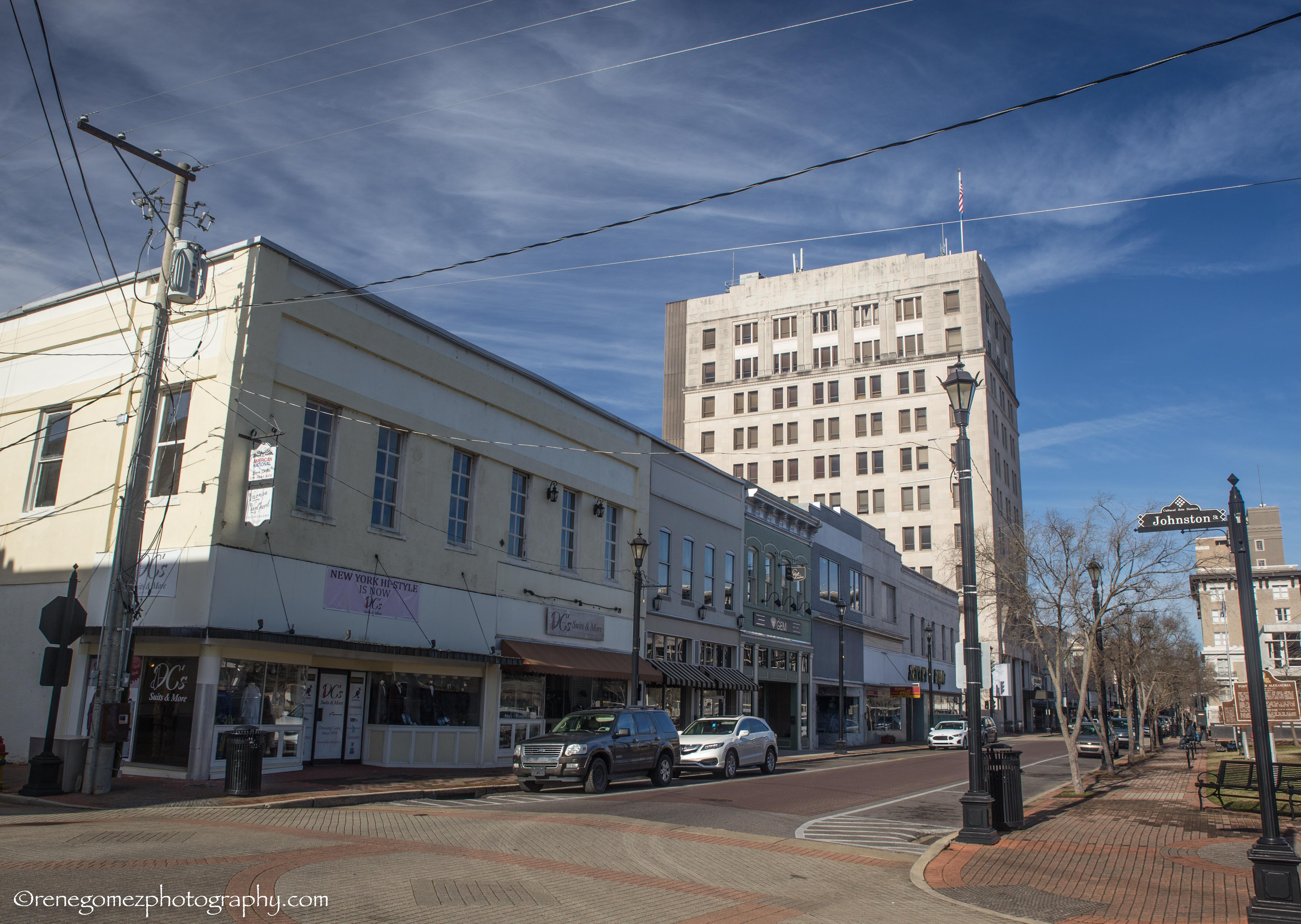
- Downtown Alexandria
Interactive Map of Alexandria, LA MSA
City of Alexandria
Alexandria, LA MSA
- Country: United States
- State: Louisiana
- Parishes: Grant; Rapides
- Principal cities: Alexandria; Pineville

Population (2020)
  - Total: 152,192
  - Estimate (2022): 149,189
  - Rank: US: 289th
- Time zone: UTC-6 (CST)
  - Summer (DST): UTC-5 (CDT)
- Website: http://cityofalexandriala.com/

The Alexandria Metropolitan Statistical Area is a metropolitan area in central Louisiana that covers two parishes – Rapides and Grant. As of the 2020 census, the MSA had a population of 152,192 (though a July 1, 2023 estimate placed the population at 148,171).

== History ==
The Alexandria metropolitan area was first defined in 1973. Then known as the Alexandria Standard Metropolitan Statistical Area (Alexandria SMSA), it consisted of two parishes - Rapides and Grant - and had a population of 131,749. By the census of 1980, the population had grown to 151,985, a 15% increase over the previous census.

In 1983, the official name was shortened to the Alexandria Metropolitan Statistical Area (Alexandria MSA), which is still in use to date. That same year, Grant Parish was removed from the MSA, leaving only Rapides Parish. A total of 135,282 people lived in Rapides Parish in 1980. That number had declined to 131,556 by 1990 and 126,337 in 2000.

Grant Parish was again added to the Alexandria MSA in 2003.

== Parishes ==
- Rapides
- Grant

== Communities ==
=== Cities ===
- Alexandria (Principal city)
- Pineville

=== Towns ===
- Ball
- Boyce
- Cheneyville
- Colfax
- Glenmora
- Lecompte
- Montgomery
- Pollock
- Woodworth

=== Villages ===
- Creola
- Dry Prong
- Forest Hill
- Georgetown
- McNary

=== Unincorporated areas ===
==== Census-designated places ====
- Deville
- Echo
- Prospect
- Rock Hill

==== Other communities ====
- Gardner
- Libuse
- Tioga

== Demographics ==
As of the census of 2000, there were 153,922 people, 56,193 households, and 40,083 families residing within the MSA. The racial makeup of the MSA was 68.95% White, 24.04% African American, 1.56% Native American, 1.27% Asian, 0.13% Pacific Islander, 0.82% from other races, and 1.25% from two or more races. Hispanic or Latino of any race were 6.35% of the population.

The median income for a household in the MSA was $29,739, and the median income for a family was $35,775. Males had a median income of $30,505 versus $20,477 for females. The per capita income for the MSA was $15,249.

== See also ==
- Louisiana census statistical areas
- List of cities, towns, and villages in Louisiana
- List of census-designated places in Louisiana
