= Antioch, Jackson Parish, Louisiana =

Unincorporated community in Louisiana, U.S.

Coordinates: 32°19′02″N 92°41′20″W

Antioch is an unincorporated community in Jackson Parish, Louisiana, United States.
