= Prospect, Louisiana =

- Census-designated place
- Location of Prospect in Louisiana
- Coordinates: 31°26′53″N 92°30′05″W
- Country: United States
- State: Louisiana
- Parish: Grant

Area
  - Total: 1.48 sq mi (3.83 km^{2})
  - Land: 1.47 sq mi (3.82 km^{2})
  - Water: 0.0039 sq mi (0.01 km^{2})
- Elevation: 184 ft (56 m)

Population (2020)
  - Total: 380
  - Density: 257.5/sq mi (99.42/km^{2})
- Time zone: UTC-6 (CST)
  - Summer (DST): UTC-5 (CDT)
- ZIP code: 71423
- Area code: 318
- FIPS code: 22-62733
- GNIS feature ID: 2586703

Prospect is an unincorporated community and census-designated place (CDP) in southern Grant Parish, Louisiana, United States. It is part of the Alexandria, Louisiana Metropolitan Statistical Area. As of the 2020 census, Prospect had a population of 380.

== Geography ==
Prospect is located in southern Grant Parish along U.S. Route 167, which leads north 10 miles (16 km) to Dry Prong and south 13 miles (21 km) to Alexandria. According to the U.S. Census Bureau, the Prospect CDP has a total area of 1.5 square miles (3.8 km^{2}), of which 0.004 square miles (0.01 km^{2}), or 0.32%, is water.

== Demographics ==
Historical population
Census	Pop.	Note	%±
2010	476		—
2020	380		−20.2%
U.S. Decennial Census

Prospect was first listed as a census designated place in the 2010 U.S. census.

As of the 2010 census, there were 476 people with 170 households, for a population density of 323/sq mi. The racial makeup of the community was 0.63% Black or African American, 95.38% White, 0.63% Native American, 0.42% Asian, and 2.94% from other races. 1.63% of the population were Hispanic or Latino of any race. 50% of the population are male thus the other 50% are female.

The median age of Prospect was 34.6 which is lower than the US median, 37.3. 52.69% of the population are married, 13.26% are divorced. The average household size is 2.79 people. 34.65% of people who have children are married couples while 14.96% who have children are single.

The median home cost was $93,600 with a cost of living at 14.90% and the unemployment rate was 8.60%.
