= Hodge, Louisiana =

- Village
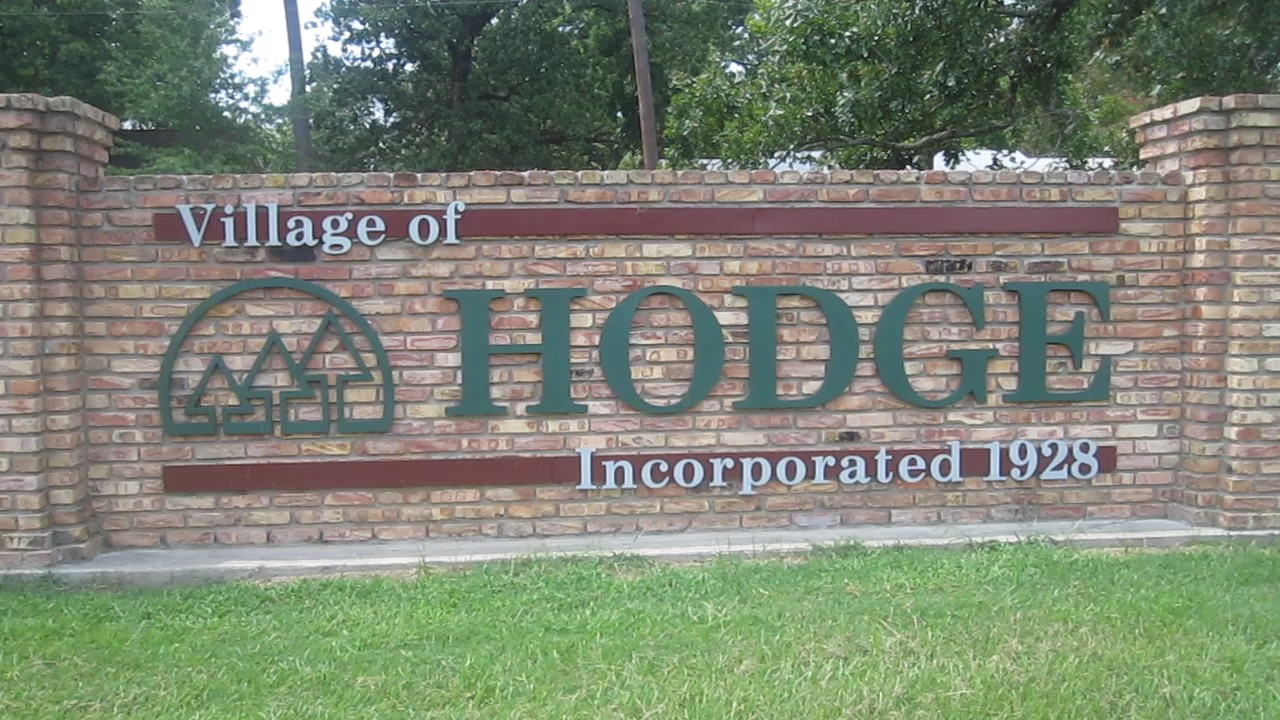
- Hodge welcome sign

- Location of Hodge in Jackson Parish, Louisiana

- Location of Louisiana in the United States
- Coordinates: 32°16′19″N 92°43′49″W
- Country: United States
- State: Louisiana
- Parish: Jackson

Area
  - Total: 1.37 sq mi (3.55 km^{2})
  - Land: 0.97 sq mi (2.50 km^{2})
  - Water: 0.41 sq mi (1.05 km^{2})
- Elevation: 200 ft (61 m)

Population (2020)
  - Total: 382
  - Density: 395/sq mi (152.6/km^{2})
- Time zone: UTC-6 (CST)
  - Summer (DST): UTC-5 (CDT)
- Area code: 318
- FIPS code: 22-35100
- GNIS feature ID: 2407477

Hodge is a village in Jackson Parish, Louisiana, United States. As of the 2020 census, Hodge had a population of 382. It is part of the Ruston Micropolitan Statistical Area.

== Geography ==
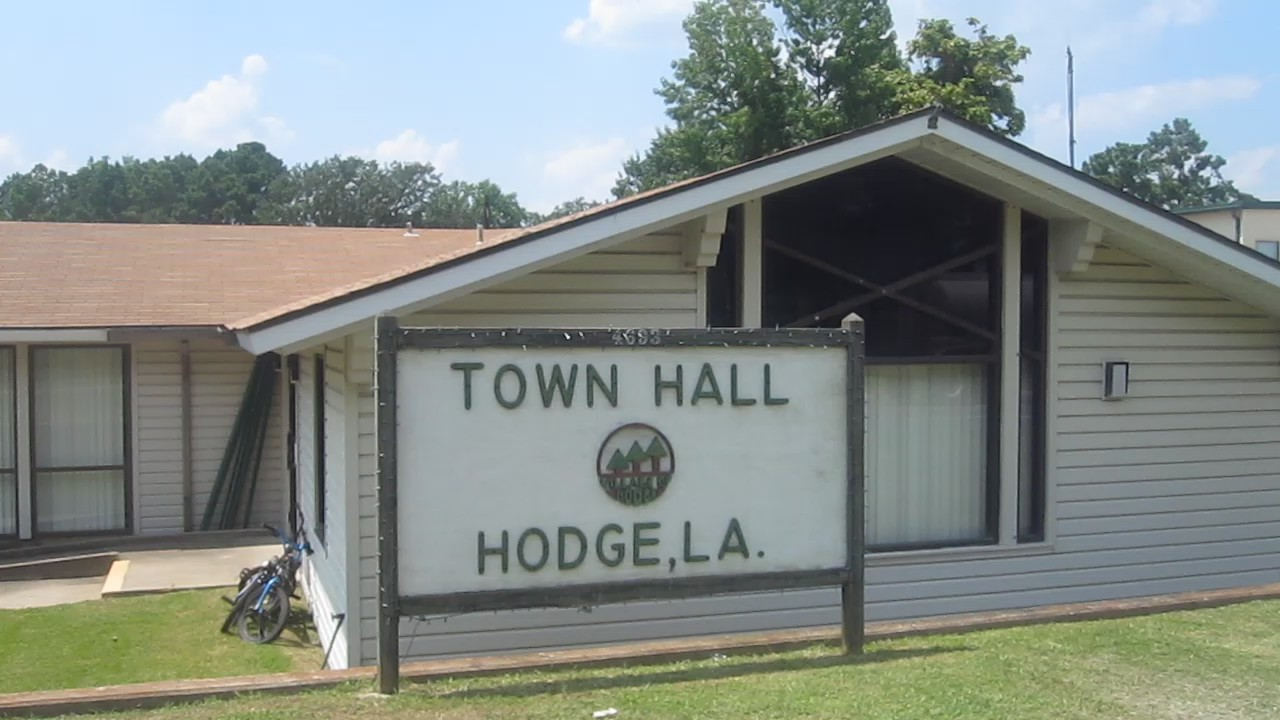
Hodge Town Hall on U.S. Highway 167

Hodge is located in southwestern Jackson Parish and is bordered to the northeast by North Hodge and to the east by East Hodge. According to the United States Census Bureau, Hodge has a total area of 1.4 square miles (3.5 km^{2}), of which 0.97 square miles (2.5 km^{2}) are land and 0.4 square miles (1.0 km^{2}), or 29.48%, are water.

Hodge is located on U.S. Highway 167, approximately 2 miles (3 km) north of Jonesboro, the parish seat, and 6 miles (10 km) south of Quitman. SR 147 intersects Highway 167 immediately north of Hodge; it leads northwest 24 miles (39 km) to Arcadia.

== Demographics ==
Historical population
Census	Pop.	Note	%±
1930	1,367		—
1940	1,445		5.7%
1950	1,386		−4.1%
1960	878		−36.7%
1970	818		−6.8%
1980	708		−13.4%
1990	562		−20.6%
2000	492		−12.5%
2010	470		−4.5%
2020	382		−18.7%
2025 (est.)	398	▲	4.2%
U.S. Decennial Census

As of the census of 2000, there were 492 people, 238 households, and 135 families residing in the village. The population density was 513.6 inhabitants per square mile (198.3/km^{2}). There were 273 housing units at an average density of 285.0 per square mile (110.0/km^{2}). The racial makeup of the village was 76.83% White, 22.15% African American, 0.20% Asian, 0.41% from other races, and 0.41% from two or more races.

There were 238 households, out of which 21.8% had children under the age of 18 living with them, 43.3% were married couples living together, 10.5% had a female householder with no husband present, and 42.9% were non-families. 41.6% of all households were made up of individuals, and 21.8% had someone living alone who was 65 years of age or older. The average household size was 2.07 and the average family size was 2.83.

In the village, the population was spread out, with 20.5% under the age of 18, 6.9% from 18 to 24, 27.4% from 25 to 44, 23.4% from 45 to 64, and 21.7% who were 65 years of age or older. The median age was 41 years. For every 100 females, there were 89.2 males. For every 100 females age 18 and over, there were 89.8 males.

The median income for a household in the village was $22,237, and the median income for a family was $32,750. Males had a median income of $26,953 versus $15,893 for females. The per capita income for the village was $14,192. About 9.9% of families and 17.9% of the population were below the poverty line, including 17.0% of those under age 18 and 18.4% of those age 65 or over.

== Education ==
Jackson Parish School Board serves the village.

Zoned schools include:

- Southside Elementary School
- Jonesboro-Hodge Middle School
- Jonesboro-Hodge High School

== Notable person ==
- Jerry Huckaby, congressman

== Gallery ==
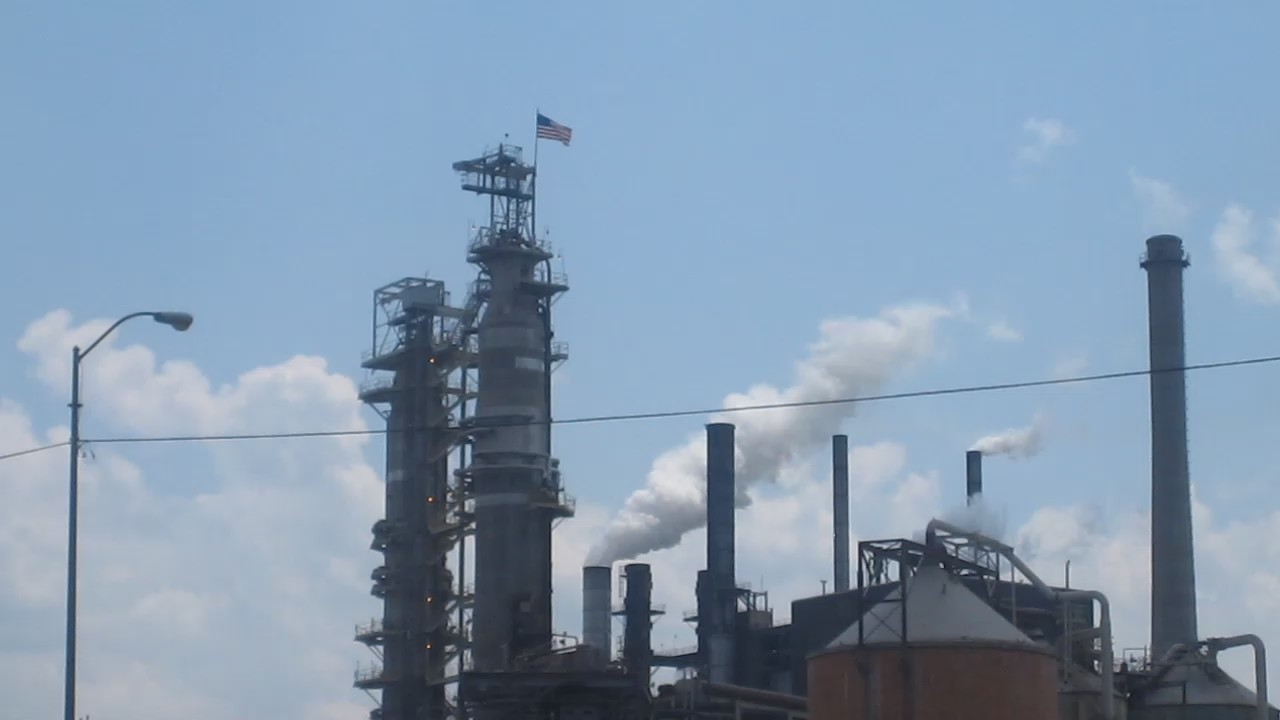
WestRock paper mill in Hodge is located at the site of a former Smurfit-Stone mill.

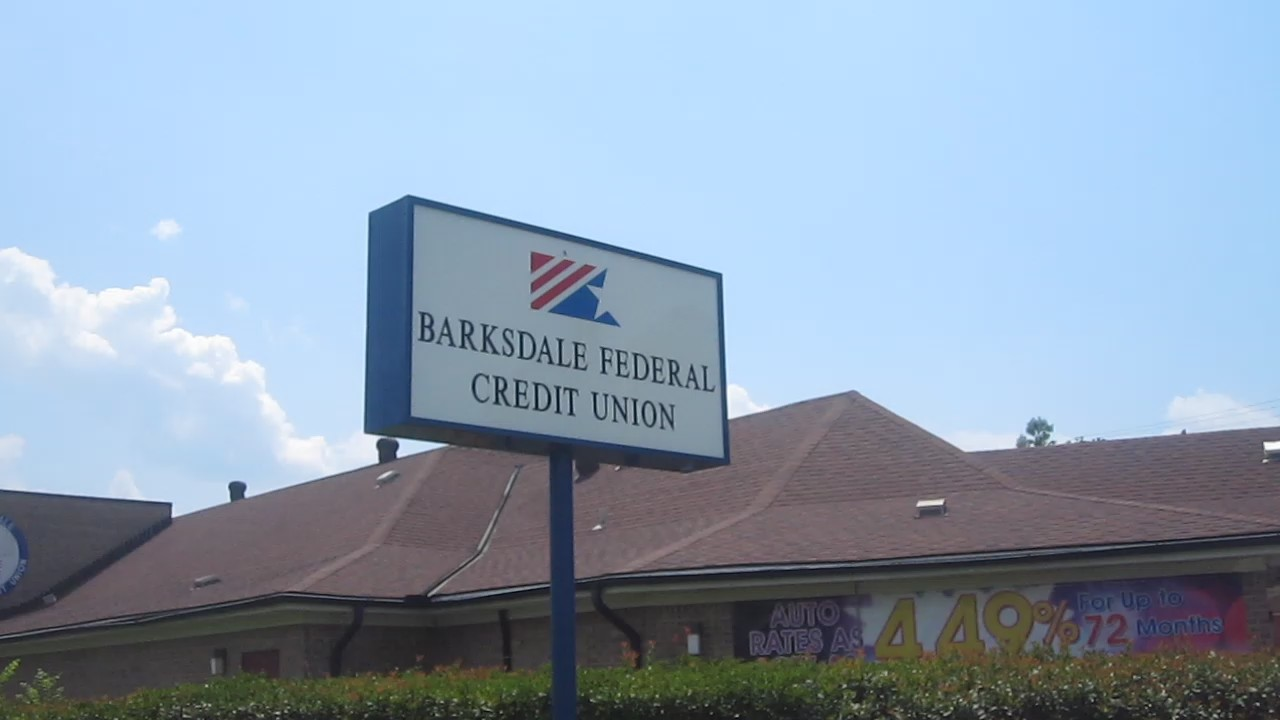
Barksdale Federal Credit Union is located off U.S. Highway 167 in Hodge.

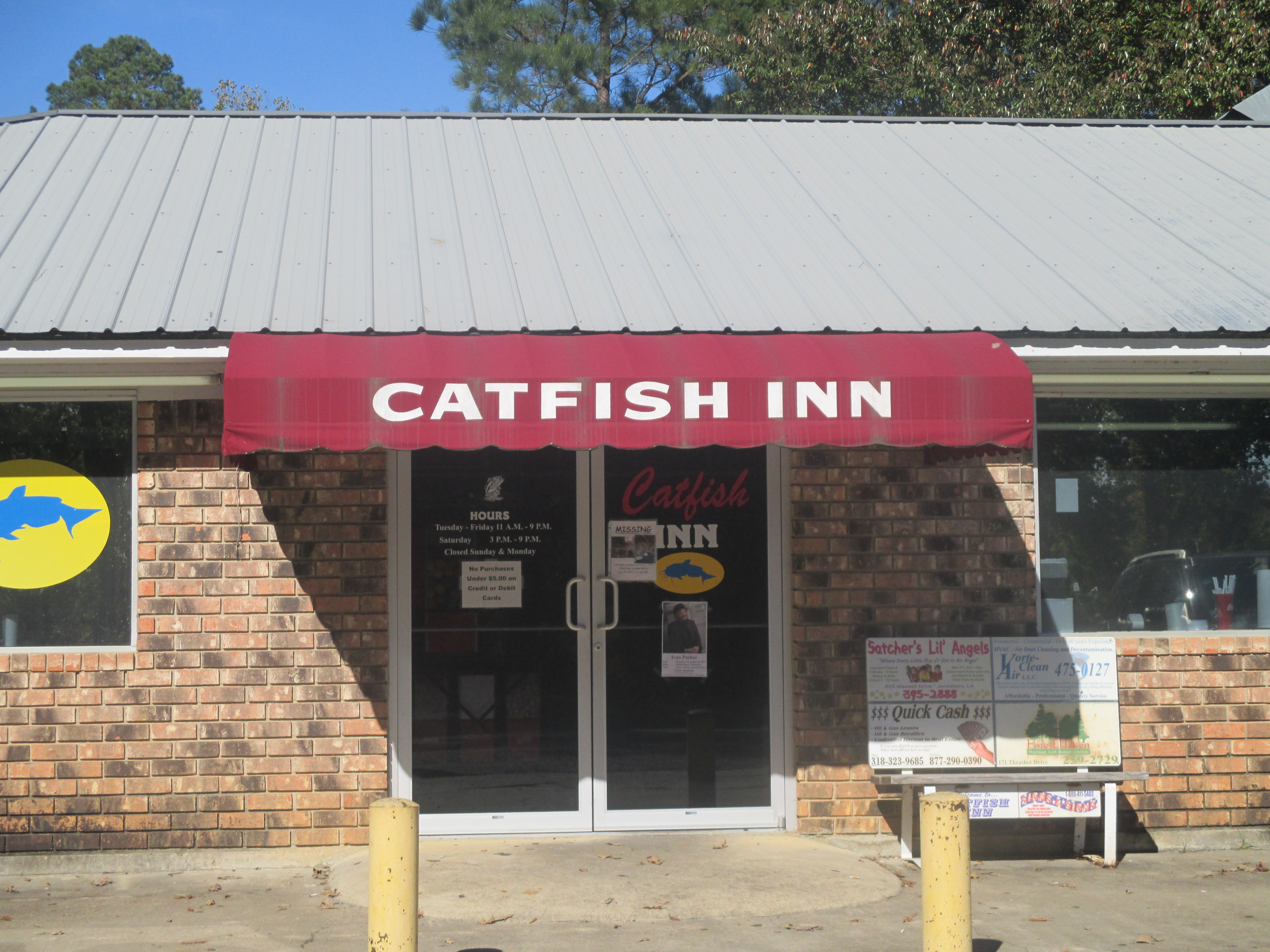
The popular Catfish Inn restaurant

== See also ==
- KRLQ
