= McNary, Louisiana =

- Village
- Village of McNary
- Location of McNary in Rapides Parish, Louisiana.

- Location of Louisiana in the United States
- Coordinates: 30°59′22″N 92°34′46″W
- Country: United States
- State: Louisiana
- Parish: Rapides

Area
  - Total: 1.87 sq mi (4.85 km^{2})
  - Land: 1.84 sq mi (4.77 km^{2})
  - Water: 0.027 sq mi (0.07 km^{2})
- Elevation: 128 ft (39 m)

Population (2020)
  - Total: 201
  - Density: 109.1/sq mi (42.13/km^{2})
- Time zone: UTC-6 (CST)
  - Summer (DST): UTC-5 (CDT)
- Area code: 318
- FIPS code: 22-47315
- GNIS feature ID: 2407499

McNary is a village in Rapides Parish, Louisiana, United States. It is part of the Alexandria, Louisiana, Metropolitan Statistical Area. As of the 2020 census, McNary had a population of 201.

McNary was established as a company lumber town that grew to a population of around 3,000 with a hospital, several stores, a theater, and even a pool. When the lumber played out the lumber company purchased a town in Arizona and moved the entire mill operation to what was renamed as McNary, Arizona. The community in Louisiana struggled but has survived as an incorporated village.

== History ==
By 1880 railroads were arriving and an industrial lumber boom began in Louisiana. Around 22 million acres were in virgin pine which was 85% of the state's land area. There were also large virgin Cyprus stands but these were mainly in swamp or coastal marsh lands. McNary began, as with many towns created along the railroads in Louisiana, as a lumber town. William M. Cady of Cady Lumber Company, along with Alfred Smith and James McNary, established a lumber mill in McNary. A town of around 3000 sprang up with all the amenities of larger towns including a theater, hospital, and swimming pool. During the first part of the 1920s mills starting cutting out. By 1923 the McNary reserves were depleted but what followed next was not atypical of most mills. The Cady Lumber Company purchased the Apache Lumber Company, Ponderosa Pine leases, the Apache Railway, and the sawmill in Cooley, Arizona, then moved the entire McNary mill with people in a twenty-one coach train. The new lumber town would come to be named McNary, Arizona. After the lumber mill left the area the community struggled but did not become a ghost town. In 1929 the town charter became inactive and it was not until 1965 that it was reactivated. Today parts of the Cady mill can still be seen in the area.

== Demographics ==
Historical population
Census	Pop.	Note	%±
1920	1,318		—
1930	211		−84.0%
1940	151		−28.4%
1970	220		—
1980	240		9.1%
1990	248		3.3%
2000	211		−14.9%
2010	211		0.0%
2020	201		−4.7%
2025 (est.)	195	▼	−3.0%
U.S. Decennial Census

At the 2000 census, there were 211 people, 76 households and 56 families residing in the village. The population density was 116.1 inhabitants per square mile (44.8/km^{2}). There were 93 housing units at an average density of 51.2 per square mile (19.8/km^{2}). The racial makeup of the village was 85.31% White, 10.43% African American, 0.47% Native American, 0.95% Asian, 2.84% from other races. Hispanic or Latino of any race were 0.95% of the population.

There were 76 households, of which 40.8% had children under the age of 18 living with them, 59.2% were married couples living together, 10.5% had a female householder with no husband present, and 26.3% were non-families. 23.7% of all households were made up of individuals, and 13.2% had someone living alone who was 65 years of age or older. The average household size was 2.78 and the average family size was 3.36.

Age distribution 30.8% under the age of 18, 8.5% from 18 to 24, 27.5% from 25 to 44, 20.4% from 45 to 64, and 12.8% who were 65 years of age or older. The median age was 37 years. For every 100 females, there were 101.0 males. For every 100 females age 18 and over, there were 89.6 males.

The median household income was $22,917, and the median family income was $30,833. Males had a median income of $28,906 versus $26,250 for females. The per capita income for the village was $12,420. About 26.0% of families and 22.3% of the population were below the poverty line, including 20.9% of those under the age of eighteen and 17.9% of those 65 or over.
