= Creola, Louisiana =

- Village
- Location of Creola in Grant Parish, Louisiana.

- Location of Louisiana in the United States
- Coordinates: 31°25′48″N 92°28′58″W
- Country: United States
- State: Louisiana
- Parish: Grant
- Incorporated: 2002

Area
  - Total: 0.42 sq mi (1.08 km^{2})
  - Land: 0.41 sq mi (1.06 km^{2})
  - Water: 0.0077 sq mi (0.02 km^{2})
- Elevation: 161 ft (49 m)

Population (2020)
  - Total: 242
  - Density: 589.8/sq mi (227.71/km^{2})
- Time zone: UTC-6 (CST)
  - Summer (DST): UTC-5 (CDT)
- ZIP code: 71423
- Area code: 318318
- FIPS code: 22-18295
- GNIS feature ID: 2407438

Creola is an incorporated village in Grant Parish and Rapides Parish Louisiana, United States. It was incorporated on January 23, 2002, under the provisions of the Lawrason Act. An incorporation election was held in October 2000 with 36 people (97.3%) voting in favor of the measure and 1 (2.7%) voting against. As of the 2020 census, Creola had a population of 242.

Creola is located in the southern portion of Grant Parish and is part of the Alexandria Metropolitan Statistical Area.

== Education ==
Creola residents are zoned to Grant Parish School Board schools.

== Geography ==
Creola is located along the southern border of Grant Parish, adjacent to Rapides to the south. U.S. Route 167 runs through the village, leading south 11 miles (18 km) to Alexandria and north 37 miles (60 km) to Winnfield. According to the U.S. Census Bureau, the village has a total area of 0.42 square miles (1.1 km^{2}), of which 0.01 square miles (0.02 km^{2}), or 1.90%, is water.

== Demographics ==
Historical population
| Census | Pop. | Note | %± |
|---|---|---|---|
| 2010 | 213 | | — |
| 2020 | 242 | | 13.6% |
| 2025 (est.) | 309 | ▲ | 27.7% |
Creola Census

As of 2010, the population of Creola was 213 with 80 households which 65% are owned, 30% are rented, and 5% are unoccupied. The median household income is $44,499. 62% of the population are married couples with 44% of them have children. Males make up 48% of the total population while females make up the other 52%.
