= Tioga, Louisiana =

Tioga
- Unincorporated community
- Location of Tioga in Louisiana
- Coordinates: 31°23′14″N 92°25′32″W
- Country: United States
- State: Louisiana
- Parish: Rapides
- Elevation: 171 ft (52 m)

Population (2010)
  - Total: 1,965
- Time zone: UTC-6 (CST)
  - Summer (DST): UTC-5 (CDT)
- ZIP code: 71477
- Area code: 318
- GNIS feature ID: 0556251

Tioga is an unincorporated community in northern Rapides Parish, Louisiana, United States. It is part of the Alexandria, Louisiana Metropolitan Statistical Area. The population in 2010 was 1,965.

== Education ==
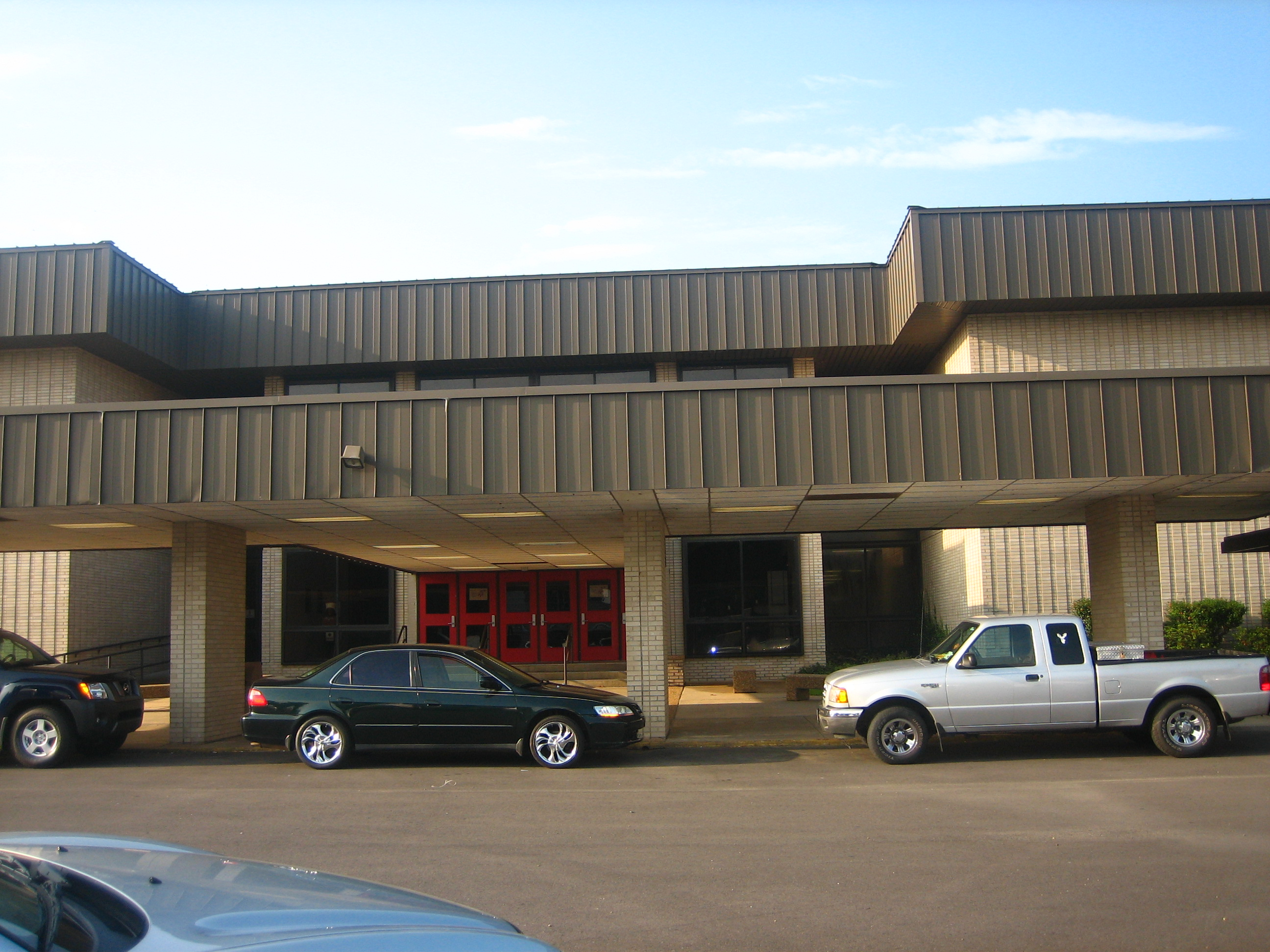
Campus of Tioga High School

Tioga Elementary serves kindergarten through grade 6. Grades 7–8 are taught at Tioga Junior High School while Tioga High School serves grades 9-12.

== Recreation ==
Tioga is also served by the Ward Ten Recreation District, which participates in Dixie Youth baseball and Dixie Girls softball. The Dixie Belles (ages 13–15) won the 2001 Dixie Belles World Series.

== Geography ==
Tioga is located at (31.38694, Lon: -92.42556).

=== Climate ===
This climatic region is typified by relatively small seasonal temperature differences, with warm to hot (and often humid) summers and mild winters. According to the Köppen Climate Classification system, Tioga has a humid subtropical climate, abbreviated "Cfa" on climate maps.

Climate data for Tioga, Louisiana
Month	Jan	Feb	Mar	Apr	May	Jun	Jul	Aug	Sep	Oct	Nov	Dec	Year
Mean daily maximum °C (°F)	16 (60)	17 (63)	21 (70)	26 (78)	29 (85)	33 (91)	34 (93)	34 (93)	32 (89)	27 (80)	21 (69)	16 (61)	26 (78)
Mean daily minimum °C (°F)	4 (39)	5 (41)	9 (48)	13 (56)	17 (63)	21 (70)	22 (72)	22 (72)	19 (67)	13 (55)	8 (46)	4 (40)	13 (56)
Average precipitation mm (inches)	130 (5.2)	130 (5)	130 (5.3)	130 (5.1)	130 (5)	110 (4.4)	120 (4.9)	99 (3.9)	89 (3.5)	100 (4)	130 (5)	160 (6.2)	1,460 (57.4)
Source: Weatherbase
