= Quitman, Louisiana =

- Village
- Village of Quitman
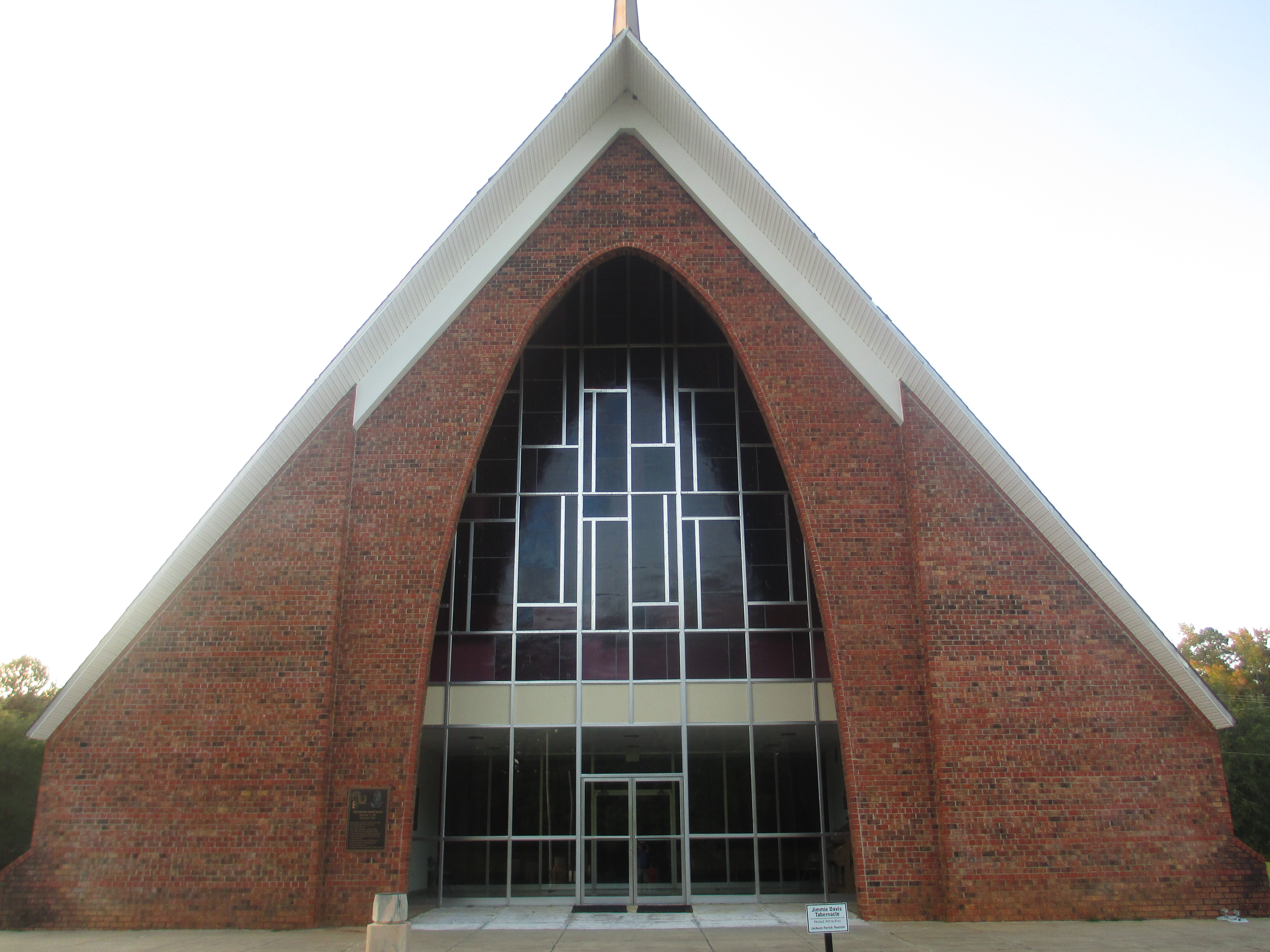
- The Jimmie Davis Tabernacle is located east of Quitman

- Location of Quitman in Jackson Parish, Louisiana

- Location of Louisiana in the United States
- Coordinates: 32°21′03″N 92°43′25″W
- Country: United States
- State: Louisiana
- Parish: Jackson

Area
  - Total: 0.94 sq mi (2.43 km^{2})
  - Land: 0.93 sq mi (2.42 km^{2})
  - Water: 0.0039 sq mi (0.01 km^{2})
- Elevation: 243 ft (74 m)

Population (2020)
  - Total: 160
  - Density: 171.4/sq mi (66.17/km^{2})
- Time zone: UTC-6 (CST)
  - Summer (DST): UTC-5 (CDT)
- Area code: 318
- FIPS code: 22-63120
- GNIS feature ID: 2407534
- Website: villageofquitman.com

Quitman is a village in Jackson Parish, Louisiana, United States. As of the 2020 census, Quitman had a population of 160. Quitman is 15 miles (24 km) south of Ruston on U.S. Highway 167, and 9 miles (14 km) north of Jonesboro, the parish seat of Jackson Parish. It is also adjacent to the Jackson Bienville Wildlife Area.

Quitman is part of the Ruston Micropolitan Statistical Area. East of Quitman is the Jimmie Davis Tabernacle, a gospel meeting hall. Behind the tabernacle are the grave sites of former Governor Jimmie Davis and his first wife, née Alvern Adams. Davis was born and reared in the area in the since abandoned Beech Springs community.

== Geography ==
According to the United States Census Bureau, the village has a total area of 0.9 square miles (2.3 km^{2}), all land.

== Education ==
Quitman High School is a public K-12 academic school in Quitman. They have a school rivalry which is Weston High School.

== Demographics ==
Historical population
Census	Pop.	Note	%±
1910	215		—
1920	177		−17.7%
1930	207		16.9%
1940	212		2.4%
1950	204		−3.8%
1960	185		−9.3%
1970	169		−8.6%
1980	231		36.7%
1990	162		−29.9%
2000	168		3.7%
2010	181		7.7%
2020	160		−11.6%
2025 (est.)	174	▲	8.8%
U.S. Decennial Census

As of the census of 2000, there were 168 people, 69 households, and 48 families residing in the village. The population density was 180.3 inhabitants per square mile (69.6/km^{2}). There were 76 housing units at an average density of 81.6 per square mile (31.5/km^{2}). The racial makeup of the village was 99.40% White and 0.60% African American. Hispanic or Latino of any race were 1.19% of the population.

There were 69 households, out of which 30.4% had children under the age of 18 living with them, 62.3% were married couples living together, 5.8% had a female householder with no husband present, and 30.4% were non-families. 29.0% of all households were made up of individuals, and 17.4% had someone living alone who was 65 years of age or older. The average household size was 2.43 and the average family size was 3.00.

In the village, the population was spread out, with 26.2% under the age of 18, 7.1% from 18 to 24, 26.2% from 25 to 44, 24.4% from 45 to 64, and 16.1% who were 65 years of age or older. The median age was 37 years. For every 100 females, there were 84.6 males. For every 100 females age 18 and over, there were 77.1 males.

The median income for a household in the village was $39,167, and the median income for a family was $39,583. Males had a median income of $36,875 versus $17,000 for females. The per capita income for the village was $17,182. About 11.8% of families and 12.1% of the population were below the poverty line, including 4.5% of those under the age of eighteen and 6.5% of those 65 or over.

== Notable people ==
- Rodney Alexander, former U.S. representative from Louisiana's 5th congressional district, resides in Quitman.
- Toby Borland is a former relief pitcher for the several teams.
- Jimmie Davis, a singer-songwriter who later served as the 47th governor of Louisiana from 1944 to 1948, and again from 1960 to 1964, was born in Quitman.
