= Louisiana's 38th House of Representatives district =

American legislative district

Louisiana's 38th State House of Representatives district
Representative
Rhonda Butler; R–Ville Platte

Louisiana's 38th House of Representatives district is one of 105 Louisiana House of Representatives districts. It is currently represented by Republican Rhonda Butler of Ville Platte.

== Geography ==
HD38 includes the communities of Forest Hill, Glenmora, Mamou, Pine Prairie and Ville Platte.

== Election results ==
Year	Winning candidate	Party	Percent	Opponent	Party	Percent	Opponent	Party	Percent
2011	H. Bernard LeBas	Democratic	51.8%	Julie Harrington	Republican	28.3%	Peter Vidrine	Republican	19.8%
2015	H. Bernard LeBas	Democratic	100%						
2019	Rhonda Butler	Republican	60.1%	Phil Cowboy Lemoine	Democratic	26.5%	Taranza Arvie	Democratic	13.3%
2023	Rhonda Butler	Republican	Cancelled	Tood McKellar	Republican	Disqualified			
