= Vidrine =

Vidrine is a surname. Notable people with the surname include:

- Arthur Vidrine (1896–1955), American physician
- Clyde Vidrine (1938–1986), American bodyguard
