= Bayou Chicot, Louisiana =

- Unincorporated community
- Location of Bayou Chicot in Louisiana
- Coordinates: 30°49′02″N 92°21′03″W
- Country: United States
- State: Louisiana
- Parish: Evangeline
- Elevation: 121 ft (37 m)
- Time zone: UTC-6 (CST)
  - Summer (DST): UTC-5 (CDT)
- GNIS feature ID: 553434

Bayou Chicot is an unincorporated community in Evangeline Parish, Louisiana, United States. It is located due north of Ville Platte.

== About ==
Bayou Chicot is home to Chicot State Park, which features the largest man-made lake in the state. Also in the community is Mountain Bayou Lake Boy Scout Camp, which was established in 1980.

== Calvary Baptist church ==
This location was the site of the first Baptist church in the state which was organized west of the Mississippi River. On November 13, 1812, Calvary Baptist church named Joseph Willis, an African American missionary as pastor. He had been a preacher to the Opelousa Indians and other ethnic groups of the district.

== Government ==
Bayou Chicot also has a volunteer fire department controlled by the Ward Five Fire District.

== Education ==
Public schools in Evangeline Parish are operated by the Evangeline Parish School Board. Bayou Chicot Elementary School is located in the community of Bayou Chicot and serves students in grades pre-kindergarten through eighth. Area high school students attend Pine Prairie High School in Pine Prairie.
