= Courir de Mardi Gras =

Cajun Mardi Gras celebration

Courir de Mardi Gras (Mardi Gras Run)
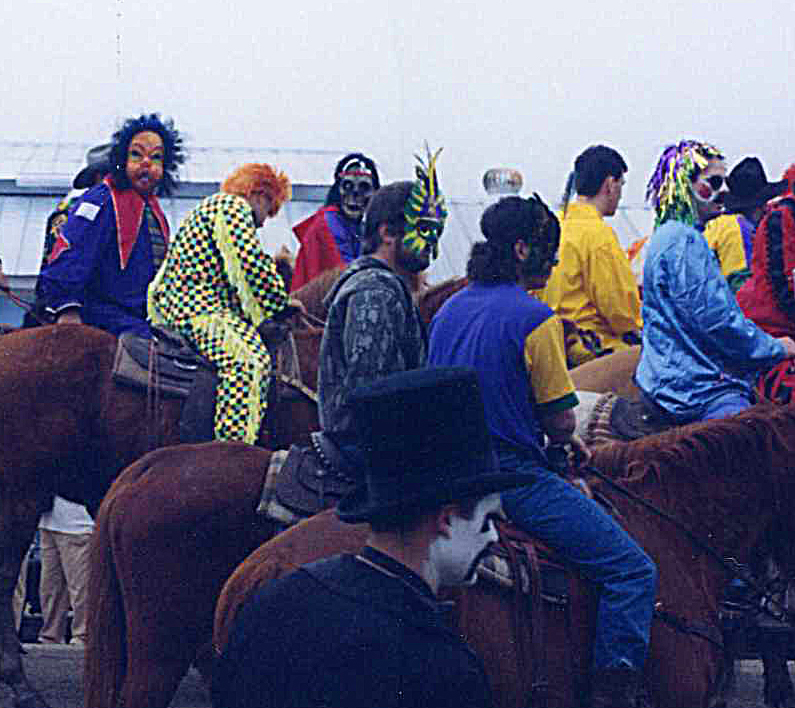
- Masked riders in Mamou
- Type: Local, cultural, Catholic, Cajun
- Significance: Celebration prior to fasting season of Lent
- Celebrations: Rural tradition, parties
- Date: Mardi Gras, Tuesday before Ash Wednesday
- Frequency: annual
- Related to: Mardi Gras

The Courir de Mardi Gras (Cajun French pronunciation: [kuɾiɾ d maɾdi ɡɾa], French pronunciation: [kuʁiʁ də maʁdi ɡʁa]) is a traditional Mardi Gras event held in many Cajun and Creole communities of French Louisiana on the Tuesday before Ash Wednesday. Courir de Mardi Gras is Louisiana French for "Fat Tuesday Run". This rural Mardi Gras celebration is based on early begging rituals, similar to those still celebrated by mummers, wassailers, and celebrants of Halloween. As Mardi Gras is the celebration of the final day before Lent, celebrants drink and eat heavily, dressing in specialized costumes, ostensibly to protect their identities. In Acadiana, popular practices include wearing masks and costumes, overturning social conventions, dancing, drinking alcohol, begging, trail riding, feasting, and whipping. Mardi Gras is one of the few occasions when people are allowed to publicly wear masks in Louisiana. Dance for a Chicken: The Cajun Mardi Gras, a documentary by filmmaker Pat Mire, provides insight into the history and evolution of this cultural tradition. In popular culture, two HBO series (the crime drama True Detective and the post Hurricane Katrina themed Treme) also make reference to the tradition.

== Origins ==
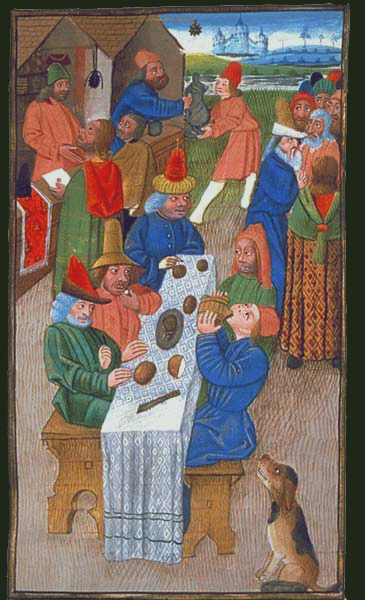
Medieval French peasants enjoying a meal

Barry Jean Ancelet, Cajun folklorist and retired professor at the University of Louisiana at Lafayette, has explained the origins of the Courir in rural medieval France:

In a nutshell, the country Mardi Gras comes from the way Mardi Gras was celebrated in France in the rural section as opposed to the urban carnival. It's an early springtime renewal and is essentially a way for communities to celebrate and find themselves.

— Barry Ancelet

These origins are found in the customs of Catholic medieval Europe, specifically the fête de la quémande ("feast of begging") of medieval France. During the fête, which was a time when begging from house to house was a socially acceptable behavior, disguised revelers would go through the countryside visiting households and performing for offerings. This is similar to other contemporary traditional European customs such as mumming and wassailing which usually occur around Christmas, New Year's, and Epiphany. These traditions originated in a time when most of the land and money was held by the upper classes. The poor, at the end of long winters and short on food, would gather in groups and make their way from castle to manor house to beg for food from the wealthy, dancing and singing in return for the generosity of the nobles. French medieval carnival celebrations also featured contests and races, which may be the origins of the chicken chase associated with the courir. A few of the traditional runs have whipping and penance as part of their traditions. These traditions are traced to the medieval flagellants, who would hold processions through the streets whipping themselves and sometimes onlookers to beat the sin out of them. Other of the traditions associated with the courir are derived from the folk traditions of pre-Christian Celtic Europe and are associated with fertility and renewal. Examples include the use of the burlap whip and the tune on which the Chanson de Mardi Gras are based, both of which are traced back to Brittany, a Celtic enclave on the Northwestern French coast near where the original settlers of Acadia were from. These traditions were carried to North America by European immigrants during the 17th and 18th centuries. In the mid to late 18th century when the Acadian settlers of the Canadian Maritimes were forcibly deported by the English, many made their way to South Louisiana, settling what would become known as the Acadiana region. The Cajuns, as they would become known to the rest of the world, have held on to many of their traditional customs, including their language (Acadian French became Cajun French), music, dances and religious festivals such as the courir. This determination to hold on to their religious customs and faith has been a major factor in creating the atmosphere that has allowed for the celebration of life, or la joie de vivre, that is so characteristic of Cajun life and culture in South Louisiana.

=== Modern revival ===
Although the tradition never died out, during the 1930s and 1940s it had begun to fade away, especially during the World War II era as many of the young men who participated were away serving in the armed forces. During the late 1940s and early 1950s the tradition began to be revived and in the 1960s got a major boost with the "Cajun renaissance", a grassroots effort to promote the unique local food, culture, music and language of the area. In 1993, documentary filmmaker Pat Mire chronicled the tradition with his film Dance for a Chicken: The Cajun Mardi Gras. The imagery of the event is represented in work by local artists such as Chuck Broussard, Francis Pavy, and Herb Roe and in the name and packaging of a locally brewed seasonal beer.

The increased popularity of Cajun music and culture has also led to more nonlocal attention for the event. In 2011 the NPR show Snap Judgement did a series of interviews at one event and the courir was used in a story line by David Simon for his HBO series Treme. In 2014 the HBO crime drama True Detective included images of courir participants and created a cult group whose roots lay partially in the rural Mardi Gras traditions.

In episode 7 of the 11th season of Parts Unknown, Anthony Bourdain participates in Cajun Mardi Gras.

== Traditions ==
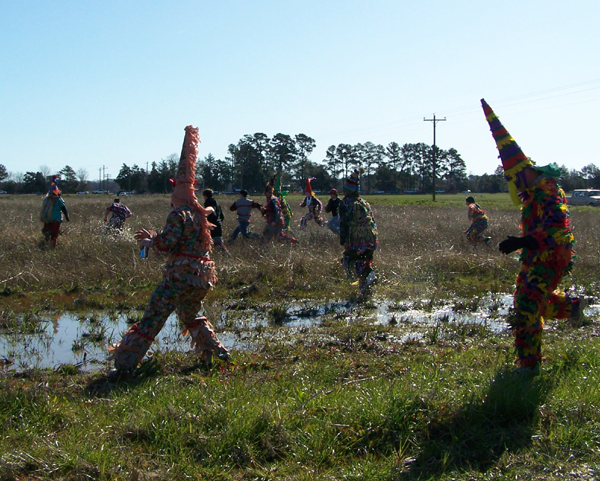
Chasing a chicken through a muddy field

People escape from ordinary life through the alcohol and the roles they portray in costume. In the early morning the riders or runners or Mardi Gras (as the troop and its individual members are known) gather in a central meeting place. As they gather, Le Capitaine (the leader of the Mardi Gras) and his co-capitaines explain the rules and traditions that must be followed. The Capitaine usually rides on horseback, wears a cape and carries a small flag. After he organizes the troop, the bands begin to play and he leads them on the route. Traditions vary in each town with the way it is carried out. Some towns have people on horse back, some on trailers and some on foot, and others use a variation of all three methods. The Capitaine is the first to approach the houses along the route, to ask permission to enter onto their property. At this point, in the spirit of frivolity, individual Mardi Gras will attempt to sneak onto the property. They are held in check by the Capitaines, who sometimes brandish a plaited burlap whip.

These whips are used to maintain discipline during the courir de Mardi Gras (Mardi Gras run.) They are used by the captain and his subordinates [co-captains] only

— Claude Durio, Co-capitaine for the Tee Mamou courir

The whips are designed to be flexible and not to inflict any serious damage onto their victims, but do produce a loud noise for the edification of onlookers. Participants claim one has not fully participated until one has been whipped. Once they are on the property, the revelers play a variety of pranks on the farmers and beg for food for the communal gumbo that lies at the end of the route. A prize ingredient is a live chicken, which is usually thrown into the air for the drunken Mardi Gras to chase through the muddy yards and fields.

=== La Chanson de Mardi Gras ===
The Mardi Gras song, known in the local Cajun French as "La Danse de Mardi Gras" and "La Vieille Chanson de Mardi Gras", is a traditional tune sung by the participants, although the exact lyrics vary greatly from town to town. The melody of the traditional folk song is similar to melodies of the Bretons from the northern coast of France. The tune is played in a minor mode not generally found in other Cajun music. This version is sung at the Church Point Courir de Mardi Gras:

Les Mardi Gras vient de tout partout, tout le tour du moyeu.
Vient une fois par an pour demander la charité.
Une vieille patate, une patate et des gratons.

Les Mardi Gras vient de tout partout, tout le tour du moyeu.
Vient une par an pour demander la charité.
Une vieille patate, une patate et des gratons.

Capitaine, capitaine voyage ton flag, tout le tour du moyeu.
Une fois par an pour demander la charité.
Et des patates, des patates et des gratons.

Les Mardi Gras vient de l’Angleterre, tout le tour du moyeu.
Vient une fois par an pour demander la charité.
Une vieille patate, une patate et des gratons.

— Le Chanson de Mardi Gras, in French

And the same song in English:

The Mardi Gras come from everywhere around the hub.
Once each year to ask for charity.
An old potato, a potato and some cracklins.

The Mardi Gras come from everywhere around the hub.
Once each year to ask for charity.
An old potato, a potato and some cracklins.

Captain, captain wave your flag, all around the hub.
Once each year to ask for charity.
And for potatoes, for potatoes and some cracklins.

The Mardi Gras come from England, all around the hub.
Once each year to ask for charity.
And potatoes, potatoes and cracklins.

— The Song of Mardi Gras, in English

A version of the song by the Balfa Brothers was included in the 1992 film Passion Fish. Many other musicians have recorded versions of the song, with notable artists being Zachary Richard, Steve Riley and the Mamou Playboys, BeauSoleil, Cedric Watson, and Hozier.

=== Costumes ===
Many of the traditional costumes are derivatives of the costumes worn in early rural France during the same celebration. The costumes not only conceal the identities of the participants, but also allow them to parody authority figures and society. Role reversals can be employed such men dressing up like women or the rich to pose as the poor. The costumes also directly mock the nobility, the clergy and the educated; celebrants wear miter hats, mortarboards and capuchons, which were initially designed to mock the tall pointy hats worn by noble women. These hats are still worn, primarily by men. The name capuchon comes from the same root word, cappa in Latin, meaning a cape or hood, that gives us cap in English and chapeau in French. Chaperon (headgear) describes the development of the word. The hats are vibrantly decorated to match (or intentionally mis-match) the colorful Mardi Gras costumes that they accompany. The capuchons worn by Mardi Gras celebrants are completely unrelated to the pointy hats worn by the Ku Klux Klan (KKK), founded after the American Civil War, and, in fact, predate the KKK costumes by several hundred years.

Originally the costumes were made from old work clothes decorated with cloth remnants and pieces of feed sack material, as many of the participants could not afford to buy material strictly for the event. This led to a patchwork style that has become associated with the costuming of the event. The shirts and pants of the costume are made by sewing together various pieces of cloth in a patchwork style. The strips of cloth are cut into fringing, and are sewn onto the sleeves, up and down the legs, and on the capuchon. The end effect is a riot of color and pattern. These costumes are also believed to have originated in medieval times. The masks are made by taking ordinary wire mesh window screen and attaching large protruding noses and painting on features such as eyes and mouths. The masks are almost see through, but usually not enough to discern the wearer's identity. Many costumes and masks include animal features like beaks, feathers, hair, fur or tails.

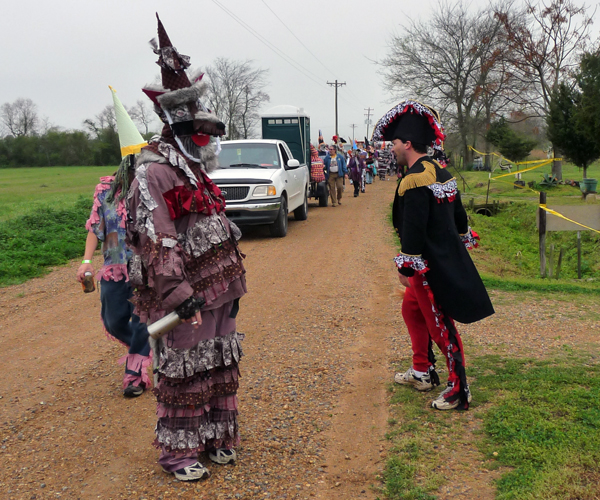
Capitane and a courir disguised as a rougarou

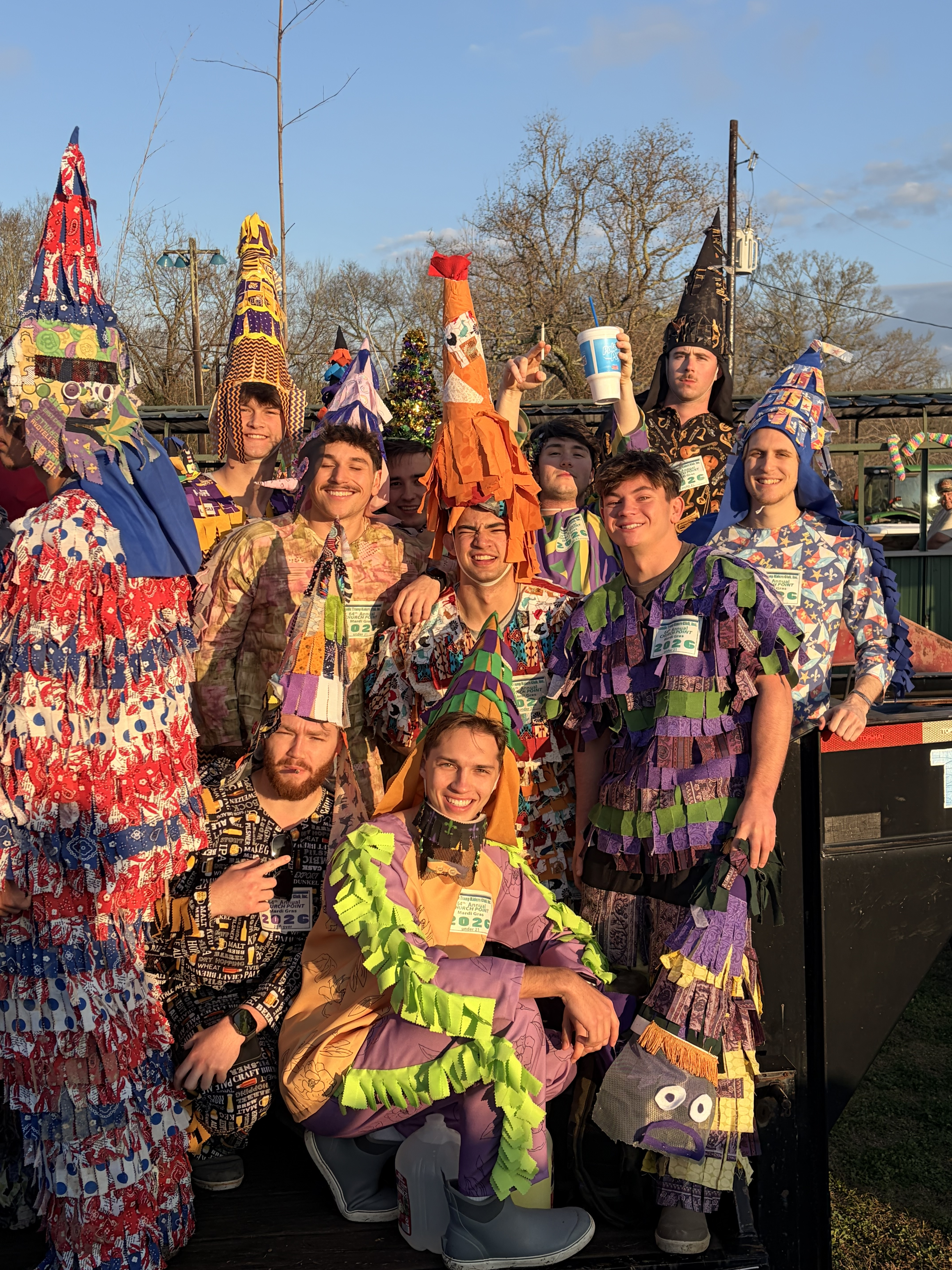
A group of participants from the 2026 Courir de Mardi Gras parade

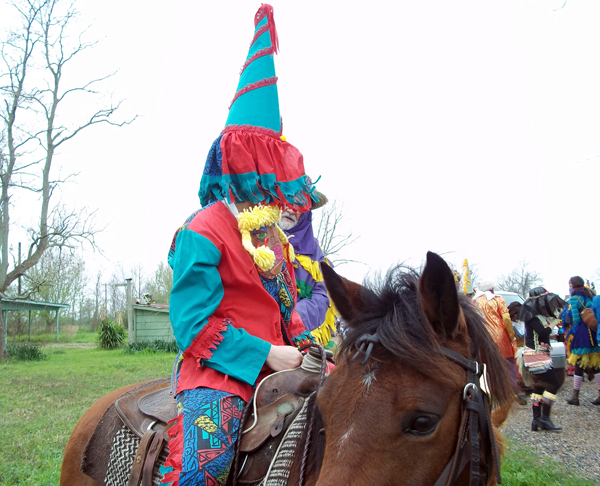
A capuchon wearing Mardi Gras on horseback

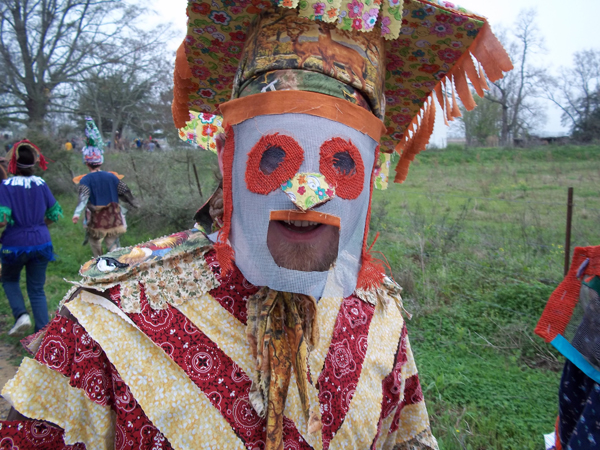
Mortarboard and wire mesh mask

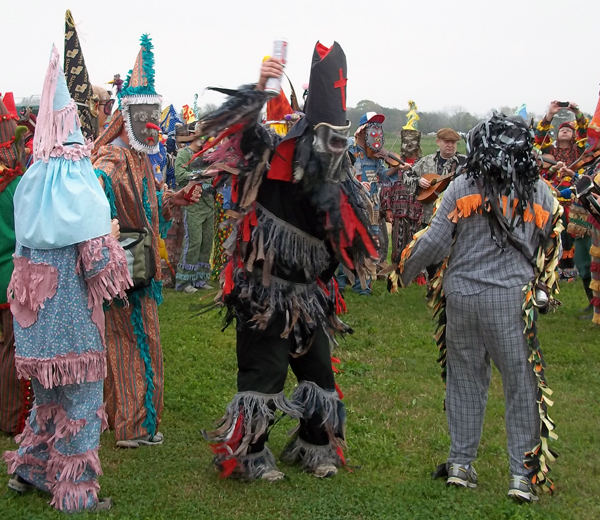
A "Miter" wearing Mardi Gras dancing in a yard

== Notable Courir celebrations ==
Each community in the Acadiana area celebrates their take on the traditional Courir de Mardi Gras. Although there are many variations, most still practice the time honored tradition with Le Capitaine leading masked revelers on horseback to gather ingredients for making the communal gumbo. A few notable examples have gained attention as vital parts of the local Cajun culture.

=== Basile ===
In Basile the Courir was suspended during World War II, but was re-established during the 1960s. A provision allowing women to be a part of the Courir has been in place since the 1980s, and they are also permitted to serve as capitaines. The Basile Courir de Mardi Gras have a tradition of begging for nickels (called cinq sous). The participants come up to bystanders with an open palm in the traditional begging gesture, and if that does not work, they will try to dig into the pockets or clothes of the bystanders as a prank in an attempt to find the nickels.

=== Choupic ===
The rural Mardi Gras in Choupic involves a ritual chasing and flogging with willow tree branches. Young, unmarried men from sixteen or seventeen years old up into their twenties secretly organize the run each year, and they do not disclose their participation in the run to anyone. Once a man is married, he voluntarily stops his participation in the Mardi Gras run. Traditionally, the Mardis Gras were on foot, but today some adaptations have been made, such as the use of pickup trucks and the use of three-wheelers by some participants. The Mardis Gras meet early Mardi Gras morning at Possum Square and then climb into the back of a few pickup trucks to hide. The pickup trucks carry the Mardis Gras from one residential section to another where they chase the children of the town, and make them recite Catholic prayers before giving them their pre-Lenten flogging with willow tree branches or sometimes with the flexible end of a fishing pole. The Choupic Courir de Mardi Gras differs from other courirs in that it does not involve the chasing of chickens nor ritual begging nor the use of horses as a means of transportation.

=== Church Point ===
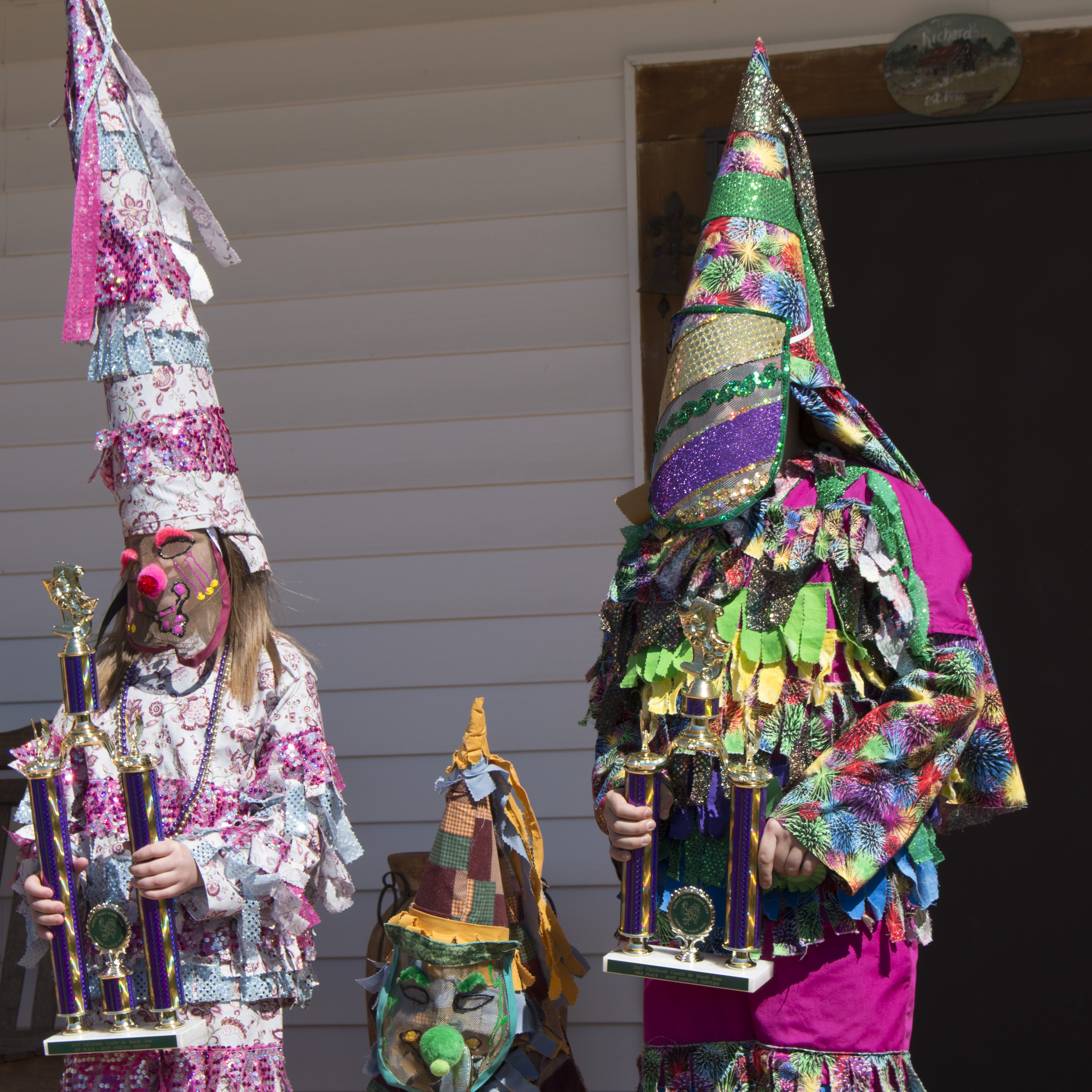
2017 Children's Courir de Mardi Gras in Church Point

In Church Point the rural Mardi Gras is basically the same as it was in the old days of the early settlers. In 1961 Elton Richard formally organized the event, which until then had been individual, independent groups of riders. Only men are permitted to participate in the run, and all Mardi Gras must be fully masked and costumed. The Capitaine holds his position as leader for year after year, until he decides to relinquish it. He appoints his co-capitaines who, like himself, must not be masked. The Chanson de Mardi Gras in Church Point has its own unique lyrics. The Church Point Courir is held on the Sunday before Mardi Gras, a consequence of the formal organization in 1961. Elton Richard and Senator Paul Tate of Mamou flipped a coin to see who would have their official courir on Mardi Gras Day. Mamou won and as a result the Church Point Mardi Gras is on Sunday.

=== Duralde ===
In Duralde, an unincorporated village between the towns of Mamou and Basile on the southwestern prairies of Louisiana, is one of the Creole Mardi Gras. Participants at times wear "white face", a way that the Mardi Gras runners dress as "the other" and overturn social conventions and the world for a day.

=== Elton ===
Elton, Louisiana is a small town in Jefferson Davis Parish, Louisiana, 15 miles west of Eunice on U.S. Route 190. Although it was defunct for a long time, the Elton courir was revived in the mid-1990s. It follows the same route and its participants sing the same local variation of the Chanson as the courir in 1925. The ride starts at sunrise just to the north of town and goes through the Coushatta Indian Reservation and then heads south back toward Elton. Like many of the traditional courirs the ride is an all-male affair.

=== Eunice ===
In Eunice the celebration dates from when the town was first established in the late 19th century. It was abandoned for a short time during World War II when many of the local young men were in the army, but was restarted in 1946. The roughly 2000 participants, both male and female, assemble at the National Guard Armory at the corner of South 9th Street and Maple Avenue at 6 a.m., and start the run 8 a.m. The route is 13 miles (21 km) long. They stop at farms along the route and beg for gumbo ingredients and call out "Cinq-sous pour les Mardi Gras!" or "Nickels for the Mardi Gras!" If ingredients or money are given, they thank the givers of charity with a dance. By 3:00 p.m. the revelers return to town for a parade along Second Street. In 1997 a new addition was added to the festivities, the baking of the world's largest king cake.

=== Gheens ===
Gheens is located between Raceland and Lockport, Louisiana, about 30 miles (48 km) from New Orleans. Every year during their Cajun Mardi Gras Chase 20,000 people flock to the town of less than 1000 people for the event. Unlike other Cajun Mardi Gras celebrations, the Gheens event features teenaged boys and men dressed as ghouls riding in pickup trucks. After the morning parades the group meets behind the local church, where costumes are donned and the ground rules are laid out by the veteran runners to the newly initiated. Each of the newcomers must line up and be given a swat by each of the veterans with the yard long willow branches so they know how bad the switches can hurt if over used. The runners are given bells to pin on their clothing. They then load up into their trucks and attack the town with their willow switches, searching for children. They chase the children to "beat the sinful stuff out of them so they can be clean for lent". Their young victims have the choice to either fall to their knees in a penitent position and say "Pardon! Pardon!" or make the Mardi Gras chase them, often taunting and daring them to catch and beat them more.

=== LeJeune Cove ===
LeJeune Cove is a rural community located about 3 miles (4.8 km) north of Iota in Acadia Parish. According to the account published in the Crowley Post Signal on 27 January 2002, the run dates from the earliest days of the L'Anse LeJeune settlement until it disbanded in the 1950s. The LeJeune Cove Mardi Gras was then revived in 2002 after a lapse of approximately 50 years. All male riders on horseback and wagons wear traditional costumes with capuchons and handmade masks. The riders travel from farm to farm, visiting and dancing with their neighbors, begging for money and gumbo ingredients while singing their unique Mardi Gras song, all just as they had done prior to disbandment. The run is now held annually on the Saturday before Fat Tuesday. In the evening, a communal gumbo and dance is held at La Pay E Bas RV Park between Iota and Eunice.

=== Mamou ===
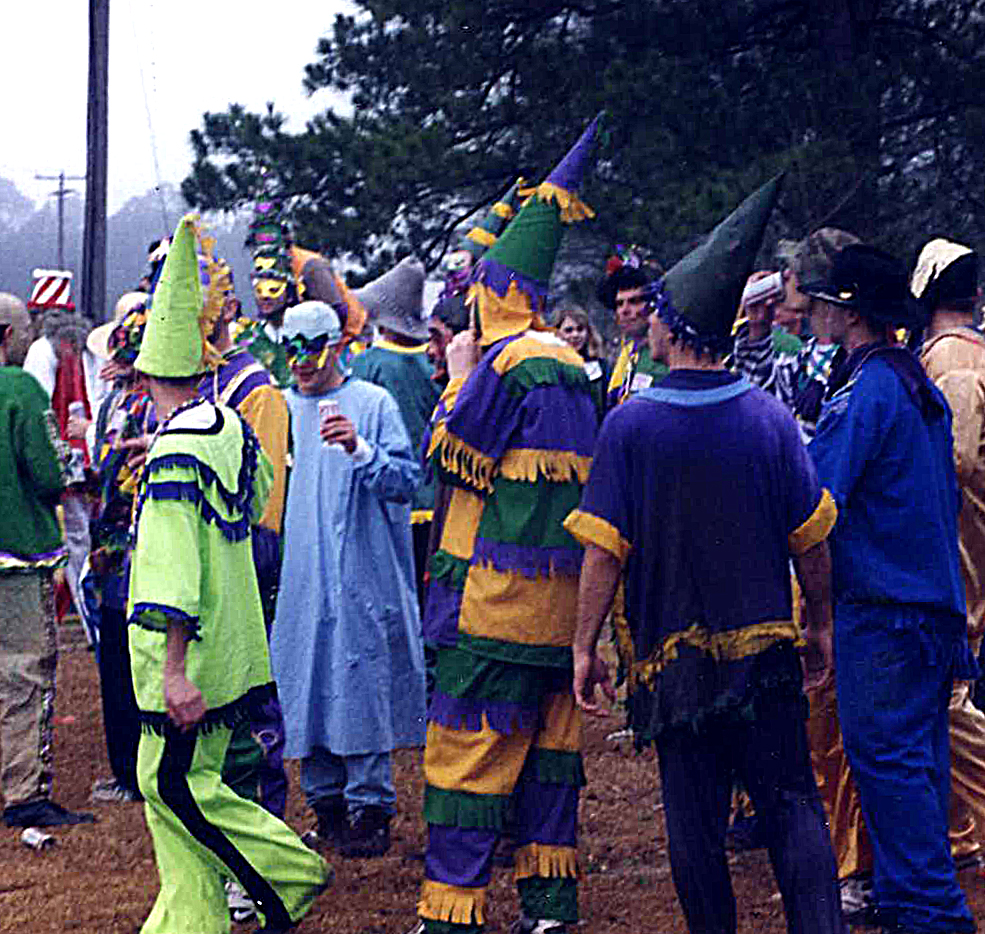
Mamou courir in the late 1990s

In Evangeline Parish, the Mamou celebration starts with a street dance held the Monday evening before Mardi Gras, with bands such as Steve Riley and the Mamou Playboys performing. A crowd favorite is the Mamou variation of the Chanson de Mardi Gras. The next day a street party begins, in anticipation of the courir, who have been riding through the countryside collecting ingredients for the evening gumbo. The Mamou Courir abides by the older traditions, with the Capitaines unmasked and all other revelers masked in the all-male troupe. They are accompanied by a wagon for the musicians and trailers for participants who do not have horses.

The event was suspended twice in its history, during the American Civil War and during World War Two. By the mid-1940s the courir tradition in Mamou had declined but was revived by Alfred "Fred" Tate, Revon Reed, and Paul Tate, proprietors of the then newly opened "Fred's Lounge".

=== Soileau ===
The run in Soileau, Louisiana is one of the few Creole Courir de Mardi Gras in southwest Louisiana, and is thought to be just as old as the Cajun versions. The rural community of Soileau is located to the west of Duralde in Allen Parish, Louisiana, not far from the Evangeline Parish, Louisiana line. They hold their run on the Monday before Mardi Gras, with its starting point at Andrew Cezar's sulky racing track. From there they head down Louisiana Highway 104.

=== South Cameron ===
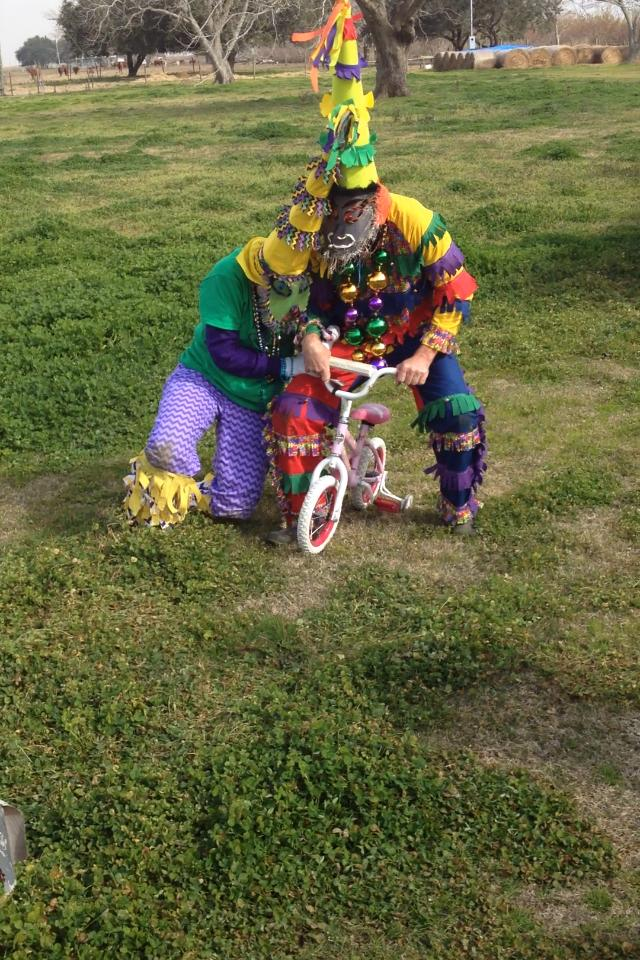
Two Mardi Gras "stealing" a child's bicycle at the South Cameron Courir

Traditional Mardi Gras courirs have been held in Creole and Grand Chenier, small towns in southern Cameron Parish, since the beginning of the 20th century. This region of Southwest Louisiana has been plagued by multiple hurricanes throughout the years, including total destruction by Hurricanes Audrey, Rita, and Ike. As a result, Mardi Gras celebrations had been defunct for over a decade. The Courir was revived in 2014 by a group of Cameron Parish natives. The group mainly consisted of young men who were Iraq and Afghanistan war veterans. Some were displaced by the hurricanes, living in different parts of the state, and looking to bring camaraderie and tradition back to their community. The Mardi Gras ride throughout the countryside in cattle trailers pulled by pickup trucks. Men and women ride together. The Mardi Gras stop at multiple houses and business in and around the towns of Creole and Grand Chenier to dance, drink, play tricks, chase chickens, and gather ingredients for their communal gumbo that night. They wear traditional Cajun Mardi Gras costumes as well as modern variations. The two to three unmasked Capitaines regulate with burlap whips. A Fais do-do with live music follows the gumbo. This courir is held two weekends before Mardi Gras day, however, dates are subject to change from year to year.

=== Tee Mamou-Iota ===
The longstanding tradition of the courir in the small community of Tee Mamou had waned by the late 1960s when new capitane was instrumental in preserving the tradition. An all-women's group was established a few years later. The women's group does their run on Saturday before Mardi Gras and the men's run is on Mardi Gras day. The capitane and co-capitanes of Tee Mamou use a special variation of the burlap whip associated with the courir. The route of the courir ends in the nearby community of Iota, Louisiana. Iota has an organized event, with Cajun and Zydeco bands playing on the main stage throughout Mardi Gras day. The highlight of the day is the arrival of the Tee Mamou courirs riding into the town in a wagon after the route through the country. The courir then gathers on the main stage with the capitaine to sing their version of the Chanson de Mardi Gras. Once this task is completed, the Mardi Gras descend on the downtown area dancing and begging for loose change.
