= Zydeco Cajun Prairie Byway =

The Zydeco Cajun Prairie Byway is a Louisiana Scenic Byway that follows several different state highways, primarily:

- LA 10 from south of Washington to Melville;
- LA 13 from Crowley to Turkey Creek;
- LA 35 and LA 178 from Rayne to Sunset;
- LA 103 and LA 740 from Arnaudville to Port Barre;
- LA 105 from Krotz Springs to Melville;
- LA 182 and US 167 from Sunset to west of Cheneyville;
- US 190 from Basile to Krotz Springs; and
- LA 3042 from Ville Platte through Chicot State Park.
