= Louisiana Highway 13 =

State highway in Louisiana, United States

Louisiana Highway 13

Route information
- Maintained by Louisiana DOTD
- Length: 64.02 mi (103.03 km)
- Existed: 1955 renumbering–present
- Tourist routes: Louisiana Scenic Byway: Zydeco Cajun Prairie Byway

Major junctions
- South end: LA 14 west of Kaplan
- US 90 in Crowley; I-10 in Crowley; US 190 in Eunice; LA 29 north of Eunice; LA 10 at Barber Spur
- North end: US 167 in Turkey Creek

Location
- Country: United States
- State: Louisiana
- Parishes: Vermilion, Acadia, St. Landry, Evangeline

Highway system
- Louisiana State Highway System; Interstate; US; State; Scenic
| ← LA 12 | → LA 14 |

Louisiana Highway 13 (LA 13) is a state highway located in southern Louisiana. It runs 64.02 miles (103.03 km) in a north–south direction from LA 14 west of Kaplan to US 167 in Turkey Creek.

The route connects several small population centers in the Acadiana region of the state west of the busier US 167 corridor. These include Crowley, the parish seat of Acadia Parish, as well of the city of Eunice, and the town of Mamou. US 167 serves the parish seats of the three remaining parishes through which LA 13 passes. LA 13 also intersects three of Louisiana's major east–west cross-state highways: US 90 and I-10 in Crowley, and US 190 in Eunice.

== Route description ==
=== Kaplan to Crowley ===
From the south, LA 13 begins at an intersection with LA 14 just beyond the western limit of Kaplan, a small city in Vermilion Parish. LA 13 initially heads due north as an undivided two-lane highway through rural farmland. After 2.0 miles (3.2 km), the highway curves northwest through Cossinade. It then resumes its original direction before passing through Leleux and crossing a bridge over Bayou Queue De Tortue into Acadia Parish.

Shortly after crossing the parish line, LA 13 intersects LA 1115, which passes through Lyons Point. 2.0 miles (3.2 km) later, LA 15 intersects LA 92 (East Whitney Street), connecting to Morse as well as several points in northeastern Vermilion Parish. Continuing due north, LA 13 intersects LA 3007 (Airport Road), which heads east toward Ebenezer. The rural surroundings quickly disappear as the highway approaches Crowley, the parish seat. LA 13 enters town on South Eastern Avenue and crosses over the BNSF/Union Pacific Railroad tracks via an overpass. Immediately after returning to grade, LA 13 intersects US 90. Truck traffic on LA 13 is directed to follow eastbound US 90 straight ahead onto North Eastern Avenue, bypassing the business section.

Mainline LA 13 turns west onto East 2nd Street and follows westbound US 90 for seven blocks to an intersection with North Parkerson Avenue. Here, US 90 continues west toward Jennings while LA 13 turns northwest onto North Parkerson Avenue, a divided two-lane thoroughfare. The route proceeds through the downtown area and around the courthouse square. After the square, it enlarges into a divided four-lane highway through the northern business area. Near the north end of town, the LA 13 truck route rejoins the mainline route via LA 1111 (Odd Fellows Road). LA 13 then passes through a diamond interchange with I-10 at Exit 80, connecting to Lake Charles on the west and Lafayette on the east. Immediately afterward, LA 13 intersects LA 100, which closely parallels the interstate west toward Egan.

=== Crowley to Eunice ===
North of Crowley, LA 13 crosses a bridge over Bayou Plaquemine Brule and narrows to an undivided two-lane highway. It then curves due north at LA 1121 (Oro Trail Road). 4.9 miles (7.9 km) later, LA 13 passes through Maxie and has a very short concurrency with LA 98, connecting to Iota and Roberts Cove. Over the next 6.4 miles (10.3 km), LA 13 intersects several more rural highways following section line roads. These include LA 365, with which it has another concurrency, as well as LA 368 at Mowata and LA 370 at Bates. Approaching the city of Eunice, LA 13 intersects LA 3116 (East Ardoin Street) and LA 3123 (Tiger Lane), leading to the Eunice Airport and Louisiana State University at Eunice (LSUE).

LA 13 crosses from Acadia Parish into the extreme west end of St. Landry Parish, simultaneously entering the Eunice city limits and widening to an undivided four-lane highway. LA 13 follows Aymond Street into town then turns west briefly onto East Maple Street, narrowing to two lanes once again. It immediately crosses the Acadiana Railway (AKDN) tracks at grade and intersects LA 3116 (East Ardoin Street) a second time. Two blocks later, LA 13 turns north onto South 1st Street, while LA 91 continues west on West Maple Street toward Iota. In the center of town, LA 13 intersects US 190 (West/East Laurel Avenue), connecting to Basile on the west and Opelousas on the east.

=== Eunice to Turkey Creek ===
Just north of the city limits is an intersection with LA 29, which heads northeast through Chataignier toward Ville Platte, the parish seat. LA 13 then makes a bend to the northwest before proceeding due north across Bayou Des Cannes and into Evangeline Parish, where it becomes known as Veterans Memorial Highway.

Shortly after crossing the parish line, LA 13 passes through an area known as Fenris and intersects LA 374. 4.1 miles (6.6 km) later, the highway curves to the northeast into the town of Mamou. In the southwestern corner of town, LA 13 crosses LA 104, connecting to Oberlin on the west. LA 13 continues along the western edge of town and intersects LA 1160. North of Mamou, LA 13 passes through the community of Reddell and intersects LA 376, a rural route.

Soon afterward, LA 13 intersects LA 10 at a point known as Barber Spur. LA 10 connects to Oakdale on the northwest and Ville Platte on the east. 5.2 miles (8.4 km) later, LA 13 intersects LA 1172 (Heritage Road) then passes through the village of Pine Prairie. On the north side of town, LA 13 has a brief concurrency with LA 106, leading toward Bunkie in neighboring Avoyelles Parish. Opposite eastbound LA 106, LA 3187 begins a long loop through the Crooked Creek Recreation Area. After 3.4 miles (5.5 km), LA 13 reaches the other end of LA 3187. The highway proceeds north for another 1.9 miles (3.1 km) to a junction with US 167 in Turkey Creek. US 167 proceeds straight ahead toward I-49 to Alexandria and southeast toward Ville Platte.

=== Route classification and data ===
LA 13 serves as the principal north–south route for the various small towns and cities it traverses. Most of the route is classified by the Louisiana Department of Transportation and Development (La DOTD) as a rural minor arterial. The portion between Crowley and Eunice is classified as an urban minor arterial. The heaviest-traveled sections of the route are located within the city limits of Crowley and Eunice and are classified as urban principal arterials.

Daily traffic volume in 2013 averaged between 3,000 and 6,000 vehicles for the rural portions of the route. The highway averaged 10,100 vehicles through most of Crowley and 14,700 vehicles through Eunice. The highest numbers reported were for the section connecting Crowley's downtown area with I-10, which averaged 19,200 vehicles per day. The posted speed limit on LA 13 is generally 55 mph (90 km/h) in rural areas, reduced to between 25 mph (40 km/h) and 35 mph (55 km/h) through town.

The entire route of LA 13 north of Crowley is part of the Zydeco Cajun Prairie Byway in the state's system of tourist routes known as the Louisiana Scenic Byways.

== History ==
=== Pre-1955 route numbering ===
In the original Louisiana Highway system in use between 1921 and 1955, the entire route of LA 13 was part of former State Route 26. Route 26 was designated by an act of the state legislature in 1921. The route continued north from Turkey Creek to State Route 1 (now US 71) near Lecompte. This section of Route 26 became co-signed with US 167 when the U.S. Numbered Highway System was implemented in 1926. By 1928, Route 26 had been extended south along the modern LA 35 corridor from Kaplan to Forked Island at the Gulf Intracoastal Waterway.

The alignment of former Route 26 as followed by the modern LA 13 remained consistent up to the 1955 Louisiana Highway renumbering apart from two minor route changes in Crowley. The highway originally entered Crowley on South Eastern Street then turned west onto East Pine Street and north onto South Parkerson Street, where it rejoined the current alignment after crossing the railroad tracks at grade. The current alignment crossing the tracks on South Eastern Street and turning west onto East 2nd Street was established around 1952. On the north side of town, the highway made a zigzag via the current LA 100 and LA 1121. This route was bypassed and straightened by 1930.

=== Post-1955 route history ===
LA 13 was created in the 1955 renumbering, following the middle section of former State Route 26 between Kaplan and Turkey Creek. The portion south of Kaplan was designated as the southern leg of LA 35. The portion north of Turkey Creek became US 167 only, as unnecessary concurrencies between U.S. and state highways were eliminated in the renumbering.

La 13—From a junction with La 14 at or near Kaplan through or near Crowley and Eunice to a junction with La-US 167 at or near Turkey Creek.

— 1955 legislative route description

Alignment changes since 1955 have generally served to streamline the route further. Several zigzags were eliminated through Eunice, beginning south of the city limits where LA 13 originally followed what is now LA 3116 into town. This was bypassed by the current straighter route around 1967. North of US 190, LA 13 originally turned west onto West Magnolia Avenue and north onto North 4th Street. After crossing the railroad tracks, the route intersected LA 29 at West Bacciochi Avenue. LA 13 then turned west onto PR 6-400 (Murphy Richard Loop) and finally, north onto PR 6-401 (North 8th Street) to rejoin the current alignment. All four right-angle turns were eliminated when the current alignment was constructed in the early 1970s, smoothing the route and relocating the junction with LA 29.

In Evangeline Parish, LA 13 intersected LA 104 via Budd Lane, now a local road. It then ran concurrent with LA 104 east into Mamou on South Street and north through town on 6th Street. At Poinciana Avenue, LA 13 continued north onto what is now LA 3149 (Old Highway 13) and followed that highway through Reddell to Barber Spur, where it made a zigzag back onto the current route. About 1971, a more direct route was opened, skirting the western edge of Mamou and continuing north of town along the opposite side of a railroad line that has since been abandoned. The new route eliminated several grade crossings at the time as well as four right-angle turns. The later abandonment of the railroad line also eliminated the need for LA 13 to zigzag across the tracks approaching Turkey Creek to intersect US 167.

== Major intersections ==
| Parish | Location | mi | km | Destinations | Notes |
|---|---|---|---|---|---|
| Vermilion | | 0.0 | 0.0 | LA 14 – Kaplan, Abbeville | Southern terminus |
| Acadia | | 8.1 | 13.0 | LA 1115 (Lyons Point Highway) – Lyons Point, Morse | Eastern terminus of LA 1115 |
| Acadia | | 10.2 | 16.4 | LA 92 (East Whitney Street) – Morse | |
| Acadia | | 13.2 | 21.2 | LA 3007 (Airport Road) – Ebenezer | Western terminus of LA 3007 |
| Acadia | Crowley | 16.4 | 26.4 | US 90 east / LA 13 Truck (North Eastern Avenue) – Rayne | South end of US 90 concurrency; southern terminus of LA 13 Truck |
| Acadia | Crowley | 17.0 | 27.4 | US 90 west (West 2nd Street) – Jennings | North end of US 90 concurrency |
| Acadia | Crowley | 18.5 | 29.8 | LA 1111 north / LA 13 Truck (Odd Fellows Road) | Southern terminus of LA 1111; northern terminus of LA 13 Truck |
| Acadia | Crowley | 18.9 | 30.4 | I-10 – Lafayette, Lake Charles | Exit 80 on I-10 |
| Acadia | Crowley | 19.0 | 30.6 | LA 100 (Egan Highway) – Egan | Eastern terminus of LA 100 |
| Acadia | | 20.5 | 33.0 | LA 1121 (Oro Trail Road) | Northern terminus of LA 1121 |
| Acadia | Maxie | 25.4 | 40.9 | LA 98 east (Roberts Cove Road) – Roberts Cove | South end of LA 98 concurrency |
| Acadia | Maxie | 25.5 | 41.0 | LA 98 west (Maxie Highway) – Maxie, Iota | North end of LA 98 concurrency |
| Acadia | | 26.9 | 43.3 | LA 365 west (Schultz Road) | South end of LA 365 concurrency |
| Acadia | Judd | 27.9 | 44.9 | LA 365 east (Branch Highway) – Branch, Higginbotham | North end of LA 365 concurrency |
| Acadia | Mowata | 29.8 | 48.0 | LA 368 (Mowata Highway) | Eastern terminus of LA 368 |
| Acadia | Bates | 31.9 | 51.3 | LA 370 (Frey Cove Road, Atteberry Road) – Richard, Church Point | |
| Acadia | | 34.4 | 55.4 | LA 3116 (East Ardoin Street) | Southern terminus of LA 3116 |
| Acadia | | 34.6 | 55.7 | LA 3123 (Tiger Lane) | Eastern terminus of LA 3123; to Eunice Airport |
| St. Landry | Eunice | 36.8 | 59.2 | LA 3116 (East Ardoin Street) | Northern terminus of LA 3116 |
| St. Landry | Eunice | 36.8 | 59.2 | LA 91 south (West Maple Avenue) – Iota | Northern terminus of LA 91 |
| St. Landry | Eunice | 37.3 | 60.0 | US 190 (Laurel Avenue) – Basile, Opelousas | |
| St. Landry | | 38.1 | 61.3 | LA 29 north – Chataignier, Ville Platte | Southern terminus of LA 29 |
| Evangeline | Fenris | 42.2 | 67.9 | LA 374 (Duralde Highway, L'Anse Meg Road) | |
| Evangeline | Mamou | 46.9 | 75.5 | LA 104 (Oberlin Road, South Street) – Oberlin | |
| Evangeline | Mamou | 47.9 | 77.1 | LA 1160 (Bieber Road, Poinciana Avenue) – Mamou, Opelousas | |
| Evangeline | Reddell | 49.9 | 80.3 | LA 376 Spur (Bond Road) | |
| Evangeline | Reddell | 50.1 | 80.6 | LA 376 (Huey Road) | |
| Evangeline | Barber Spur | 51.3 | 82.6 | LA 10 – Ville Platte, Oakdale | |
| Evangeline | | 56.5 | 90.9 | LA 1172 (Heritage Road) | Northern terminus of LA 1172 |
| Evangeline | Pine Prairie | 58.1 | 93.5 | LA 106 west (Beaver Road) – Oakdale | South end of LA 106 concurrency |
| Evangeline | | 58.8 | 94.6 | LA 106 east (St. Landry Highway) – Bayou Chicot, Bunkie; LA 3187 (Crooked Creek Parkway) | North end of LA 106 concurrency; southern terminus of LA 3187; LA 3187 to Crooked Creek Recreation Area |
| Evangeline | | 62.2 | 100.1 | LA 3187 (Crooked Creek Parkway) | Northern terminus of LA 3187; to Crooked Creek Recreation Area |
| Evangeline | Turkey Creek | 64.2 | 103.3 | US 167 – Ville Platte, Alexandria | Northern terminus |
1.000 mi = 1.609 km; 1.000 km = 0.621 mi: Concurrency terminus

== Truck route ==
Louisiana Highway 13 Truck
- Location: Crowley
- Length: 2.58 mi (4.15 km)

Louisiana Highway 13 Truck (LA 13 Truck) runs 2.58 miles (4.15 km) in a general north–south direction from US 90 and LA 13 to the junction of LA 13 and LA 1111 in Crowley. The route diverts truck traffic around the business section of the city via other state-maintained roadways, eliminating the need for large trucks to navigate several right-angle turns around the courthouse square. Unlike its parent route, the signage for LA 13 Truck carries no directional banners.

From the south, LA 13 Truck begins at the junction of US 90 and LA 13 in Crowley. While LA 13 turns west onto East 2nd Street, running concurrent with westbound US 90, the truck route proceeds straight ahead to follow eastbound US 90 onto North Eastern Avenue. After four blocks, both highways turn east onto East Hutchinson Avenue. Three blocks later, the roadway curves due north and skirts the eastern city limits. While US 90 curves again to the east toward Rayne, LA 13 Truck departs to continue north a short distance via LA 1111 Spur (Tower Road) to an intersection with mainline LA 1111 at Odd Fellows Road. At this intersection, signage directs motorists to continue onto northbound LA 1111 to I-10 at Exit 82, connecting to Lake Charles and Lafayette. LA 13 Truck turns due west with southbound LA 1111 and proceeds 1.2 miles (1.9 km) to rejoin mainline LA 13 (North Parkerson Avenue) at a point just south of Exit 80 on I-10.

LA 13 Truck is an undivided two-lane highway, except for the first four blocks following North Eastern Avenue where it is a divided two-lane highway. The portion of the route shared with US 90 is classified by the La DOTD as an urban minor arterial with an average daily traffic volume of 10,600 vehicles in 2013. The remainder of the route is classified as an urban collector and averaged 2,300 vehicles per day. The posted speed limit is initially 35 mph (55 km/h), increasing to 45 mph (70 km/h) along LA 1111.

The entire highway is in Acadia Parish.

| Location | mi | km | Destinations | Notes |
|---|---|---|---|---|
| Crowley | 0.0 | 0.0 | US 90 west / LA 13 north (East 2nd Street) – Jennings LA 13 south (North Eastern Avenue) – Kaplan | Southern terminus; south end of US 90 concurrency |
| | 1.1 | 1.8 | US 90 east (Crowley–Rayne Highway) – Rayne LA 1111 Spur | North end of US 90 concurrency; south end of LA 1111 Spur concurrency |
| Crowley | 1.3 | 2.1 | LA 1111 north (Tower Road) to I-10 LA 1111 Spur (Odd Fellows Road) | North end of LA 1111 Spur concurrency; south end of LA 1111 concurrency |
| Crowley | 2.5 | 4.0 | LA 13 (North Parkerson Avenue) – Crowley, Eunice; LA 1111 | Northern terminus; north end of LA 1111 concurrency |
1.000 mi = 1.609 km; 1.000 km = 0.621 mi: Concurrency terminus
