= Fred's Lounge =

Music venue in Mamou, LA

- Interactive map of Fred's Lounge
- Address: 420 6th St; Mamou, Louisiana 70554; United States
- Coordinates: 30.630917°N 92.419467°W

Construction
- Opened: 1946-11-20

Fred's Lounge is a music venue and bar located in Mamou, Louisiana, the "Cajun Music Capital of the World." Fred's Lounge is an important part of Cajun musical history and Cajun French history. The bar is only open on Saturday mornings, except during Mardi Gras, when it is open for the rest of the week.

== History ==
The Lounge was purchased by Alfred "Fred" Tate (11/20/1912 - 7/15/1992) in 1946 under the original name Tate's Bar.

In 1950, Fred's Lounge revitalized the Courir de Mardi Gras tradition.

Since 1962, radio broadcasts from Fred's Lounge have been done in Louisiana French.

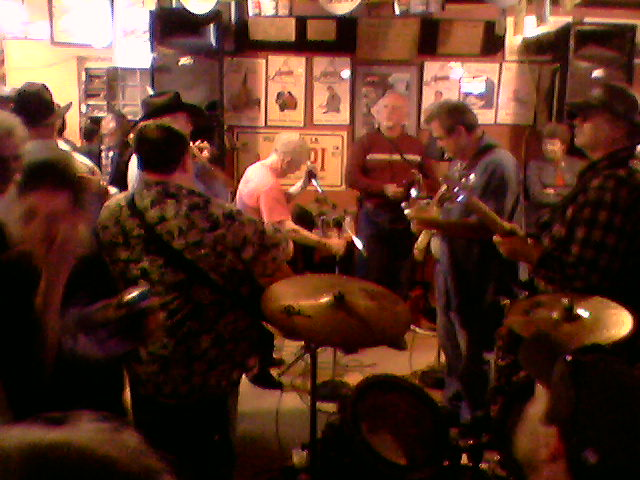
A 2010 performance at Fred's Lounge

In 1996, Louisiana governor Mike Foster declared Fred's Lounge the launching place of the Evangeline parish French renaissance.
