= Basile High School =

Location
- 2835 2nd Street; Basile, (Evangeline Parish), Louisiana 70515; United States
- Coordinates: 30.4866°N 92.5970°W

Information
- Type: Public high school
- Established: 1925
- School district: Evangeline Parish School Board
- Principal: Anthony Bertrand
- Staff: 30.41 (FTE)
- Enrollment: 448 (2023-2024)
- Student to teacher ratio: 17.43
- Colors: Red and white
- Athletics conference: District 5-1A
- Mascot: Bubba the Bearcat
- Nickname: Bearcats

Basile High School is a public upper-elementary, junior and senior high school (grades 5–12) in Basile, Louisiana. It is a part of Evangeline Parish Public Schools.

== History ==
A public school existed in the town of Basile from 1909 to 1913, however, education there only went up to the ninth grade. Students who wished to continue to tenth and eleventh grades had to attend the Methodist-run Evangeline Preparatory Academy, a private school. In 1919 the Basile Graded School was built for a cost of $6,000. In 1925, Evangeline Parish and Acadia Parish reached an agreement to jointly control Basile High School, because for some time more than half of the students had been from Acadia Parish. That same year, the first brick public school building was constructed by P.O. Oliver and Sons of Lake Charles. The school's first graduating class, in 1926, had only one student. The school's first principal was Mr. J.A. Babin.

In 1936 an election was held to fund the construction of a combined gym and auditorium, as well as to establish an agriculture program.

In 1953, the school was accredited by the Southern Association of Colleges and Schools for the first time.

From the Reconstruction era until 1969, Evangeline Parish maintained a dual education system, with one set of schools for White students, and another for Black students. Basile High only allowed White students to attend. In 1969, the Federal courts caused the schools to be integrated, and Black students from nearby William W. Stewart were allowed to attend for the first time. In response, the Evangeline Parish School Board considered closing BHS, along with all the Parish schools, a move which was opposed by the Evangeline Parish Teachers association.

By the fall of 1971 the high school had an enrollment of 430 White and 132 Black students. In 2012, the school system was granted unitary status.

In 2011, Basile was one of only 36 high schools in Louisiana that met the full requirements of the Louisiana Promise initiative, including having an 80% graduation rate and improving by 10%.

In 2018, Black students were 1.6 times more likely to be disciplined than White students. While 24% of the student body was non-White, the composition of the gifted and talented programs were 100% White.

Ms. Madelyn Miller, who had previously served as assistant principal, was named interim principal in 1995 becoming the first female and first Black person to hold the office at Basile High School.

== BHS Band ==
The Basile High School band was organized in 1938 with Ms. Belle Cox as band director. The band's first uniforms were simple red capes lined with white satin and were created by the school's home economics department. Traditionally, the band marches in the Cotton Festival parade in Ville Platte, the Swine Festival parade in Basile, as well as local Christmas and Mardi Gras parades.

== Athletics ==
The Basile Bearcats compete in Class 1A of the LHSAA.

The school's original colors were scarlet and white, however, by the 1950s this had changed to the modern red and white school colors. Basile had no official mascot in its earliest days. According to an article in the local newspaper, an open contest was held sometime in the late 1930s to select a school mascot. The final two choices were "Phantoms" and "Bearcats". Students allegedly chose the "Bearcats" because of the popularity of a semi-professional baseball team called the Houston Bearcats. Today, while even the official Basile High School website and much of the artwork around the school depicts the Bearcat mascot as a fierce, almost Black panther-like creature, the actual "bearcat," or binturong, is a member of the mongoose family.

The wrestling team won the Louisiana state championship in 1991, 2019, 2020, 2021, and 2022.

In 1950, BHS won the Louisiana 6 man football state championship.

In the 1990s, BHS attracted attention because they rescheduled school athletic events to avoid conflict with the opening of squirrel hunting season.

=== State Championships ===
Six-Man Football

- (1) 1950

Wrestling

- (5) 1991, 2019, 2020, 2021, 2022, 2025

== Notable people ==
- Tommy McClelland, athletic director, Rice University.
- Ronald G. Richard, retired Major General, United States Marine Corps.
