= Evangeline Parish, Louisiana =

Parish in Louisiana, United States

Evangeline Parish
- Parish
- Parish of Evangeline; Paroisse d'Évangéline (French)
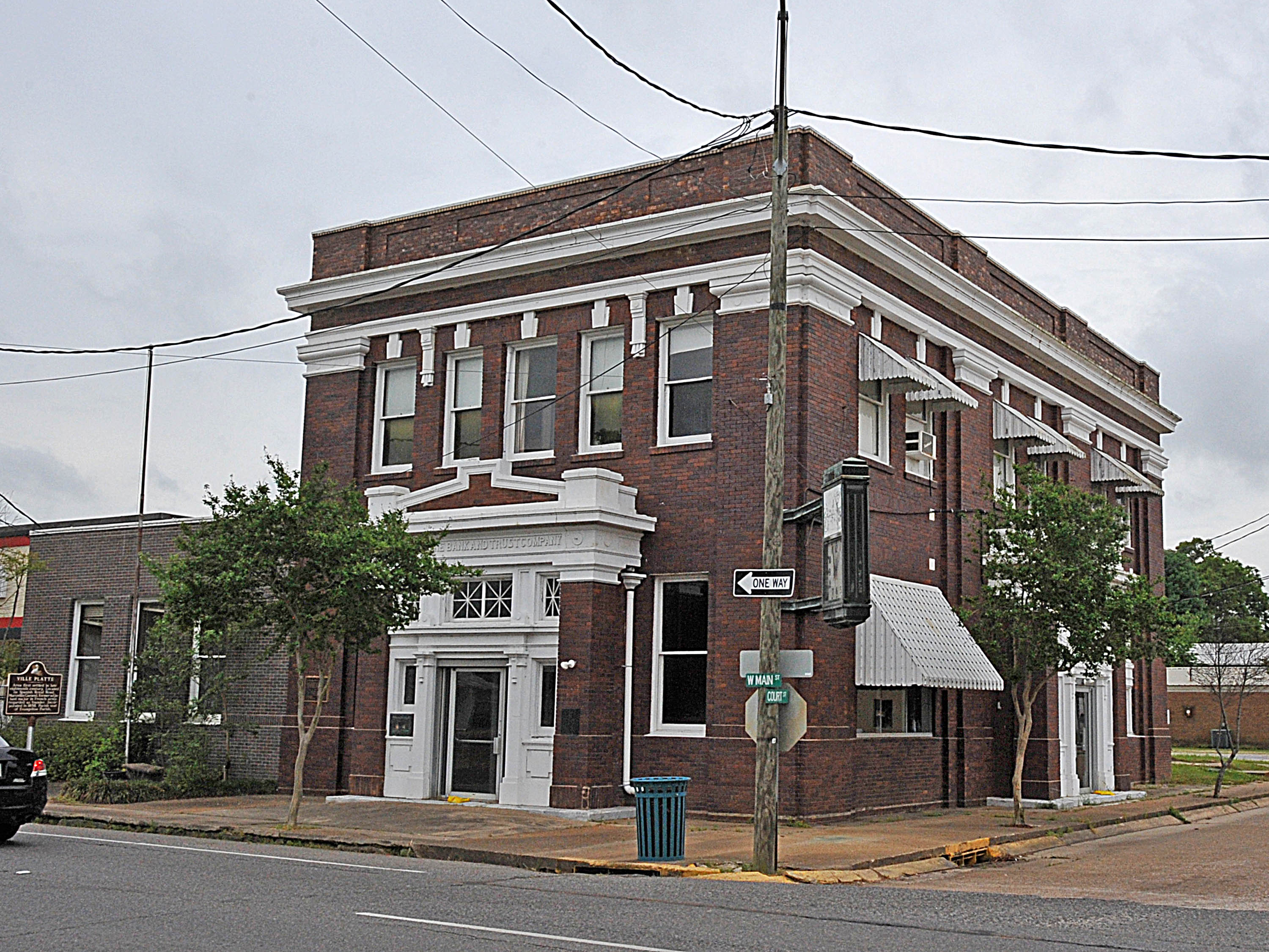
- Evangeline Bank and Trust Co. Building, Ville Platte, Louisiana

- Location within the U.S. state of Louisiana
- Coordinates: 30°44′N 92°25′W
- Country: United States
- State: Louisiana
- Founded: 1910
- Named for: Acadian heroine of the poem "Evangeline"
- Seat: Ville Platte
- Largest city: Ville Platte

Area
  - Total: 680 sq mi (1,800 km^{2})
  - Land: 662 sq mi (1,710 km^{2})
  - Water: 17 sq mi (44 km^{2}) 2.5%

Population (2020)
  - Total: 32,350
  - Estimate (2025): 31,980 ▼
  - Density: 48.9/sq mi (18.9/km^{2})
- Time zone: UTC−6 (Central)
  - Summer (DST): UTC−5 (CDT)
- Congressional district: 4th

Evangeline Parish (French: Paroisse d'Évangéline) is a parish located in the U.S. state of Louisiana. As of the 2020 census, the population was 32,350. The parish seat is Ville Platte.

== History ==
The parish was created out of lands formerly belonging to St. Landry Parish in 1910. The majority of the area was originally settled by French Canadian colonists and former colonial marines (coureurs de bois) from such outposts as Fort Toulouse and Fort Kaskaskia and later included 19th-century French-speaking soldiers and immigrant families.

The early generations were born in colonial French colonies, which included the enormous Louisiana territory ('Upper and Lower' Louisiana) known as "la Nouvelle France", and later were born under Spanish rule.

Many people of Evangeline are primarily of French, English, and Spanish descent from Louisiana's colonial period. Examples of the French family names are Fontenot, Brignac, Ardoin, Bordelon, Vidrine, Courville, Gaspard, LaFleur, Chataignier, Dupre, Berza, Manuel, Ratelle, Fuselier, Landreneau, Andrepont, Guillory, Soileau, LeBas, and Gobert, among others. People of Spanish Canary Islands heritage (Isleños) can be observed to have settled in the Parish as well, bringing names like Aguillard, Casaneuva, De Soto, Ortego, Rozas, and Segura. Many English Americans as colonists came from the Eastern United States to settle in the newly purchased Louisiana Territory often married into Acadian families. Some prominent English surnames include Chapman, Kershaw, Young, Reed, Langley, Tate and Buller.

A few Acadians such as François Pitre and his wife settled the area between Evangeline and St. Landry parishes, preferring the rich pre-American and pre–Civil War era Cajun planter's lifestyle over that of the humble and isolated existence of their Acadiana cousins.

The parish was named Evangeline in honor of Henry Wadsworth Longfellow's narrative poem, Evangeline. It was from this poem that founding father Paulin Fontenot was to propose the namesake of "Evangeline" for this parish, allegedly foreseeing an emerging American tourism centered upon the Acadian saga. (See Ville Platte Gazette, Sept. 2010) In 19th-century American literature, she would gain popularity through Hollywood's interest, and thus began the embryonic 'Acadian-based' tourism which sprang up in St. Martinville. Evangeline Parish is mentioned in the Randy Newman song "Louisiana 1927", in which he described the Great Mississippi Flood which covered it with six feet of water.

Ville Platte, Louisiana, the seat of Evangeline Parish, was itself so named by one of Napoleon Bonaparte's former soldiers, Adjutant Major Marcellin Garand (1781–1852), of Savoy, France. (See Napoleon's Soldiers In America, by Simone de la Souchere-Delery, 1999).

== Geography ==
According to the U.S. Census Bureau, the parish has a total area of 680 square miles (1,800 km^{2}), of which 662 square miles (1,710 km^{2}) is land and 17 square miles (44 km^{2}) (2.5%) is water.

=== Major highways ===
- Interstate 49
- U.S. Highway 167
- U.S. Highway 190
- Louisiana Highway 10
- Louisiana Highway 13
- Louisiana Highway 29
- Louisiana Highway 95
- Louisiana Highway 104
- Louisiana Highway 106
- Louisiana Highway 115
- Louisiana Highway 181
- Louisiana Highway 363
- Louisiana Highway 374
- Louisiana Highway 376
- Louisiana Highway 748
- Louisiana Highway 757
- Louisiana Highway 758
- Louisiana Highway 1157-1
- Louisiana Highway 1158
- Louisiana Highway 1159
- Louisiana Highway 1160
- Louisiana Highway 1161
- Louisiana Highway 1162
- Louisiana Highway 1163
- Louisiana Highway 1164
- Louisiana Highway 1165
- Louisiana Highway 1166
- Louisiana Highway 1167
- Louisiana Highway 1168
- Louisiana Highway 1169
- Louisiana Highway 1171
- Louisiana Highway 1172
- Louisiana Highway 1174
- Louisiana Highway 3042
- Louisiana Highway 3096
- Louisiana Highway 3149
- Louisiana Highway 3187
- Louisiana Highway 3247
- Louisiana Highway 3277

=== Adjacent parishes ===
- Rapides Parish (north)
- Avoyelles Parish (northeast)
- St. Landry Parish (east)
- Acadia Parish (south)
- Allen Parish (west)

=== National protected area ===
- Lacassine National Wildlife Refuge (part)

=== State parks ===
- Chicot State Park
- Louisiana State Arboretum

== Communities ==
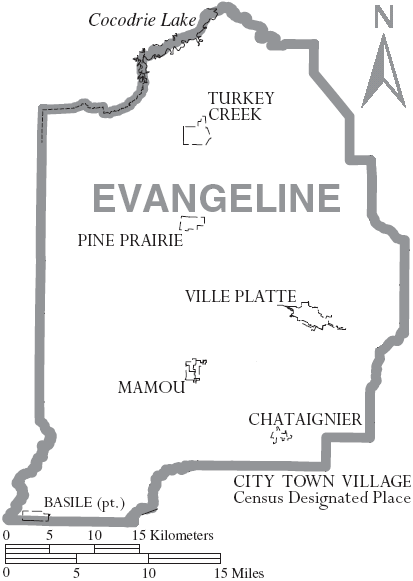
Map of Evangeline Parish, with municipal labels

=== City ===
- Ville Platte (parish seat and largest municipality)

=== Towns ===
- Basile
- Mamou

=== Villages ===
- Chataignier
- Pine Prairie
- Turkey Creek

=== Unincorporated areas ===
==== Census-designated places ====
- Reddell

==== Other unincorporated communities ====
- Barber Spur
- Bayou Chicot
- Beale
- Beaver
- Belaire Cove
- Centerville
- Clarks Landing
- Clearwater
- Cypress Creek
- Dossman
- Duralde
- Easton
- Fenris
- Frilot Cove
- Johnson Landing
- Lake Cove
- L'Anse Grise
- Lone Pine
- Meridian
- Nobrac
- Point Blue
- Redland
- Saint Landry
- Squealer Point Landing
- Tate Cove
- Tyrone
- Unatex
- Vidrine

== Demographics ==
Historical population
| Census | Pop. | Note | %± |
|---|---|---|---|
| 1920 | 23,485 | | — |
| 1930 | 25,483 | | 8.5% |
| 1940 | 30,497 | | 19.7% |
| 1950 | 31,629 | | 3.7% |
| 1960 | 31,639 | | 0.0% |
| 1970 | 31,932 | | 0.9% |
| 1980 | 33,343 | | 4.4% |
| 1990 | 33,274 | | −0.2% |
| 2000 | 35,434 | | 6.5% |
| 2010 | 33,984 | | −4.1% |
| 2020 | 32,350 | | −4.8% |
| 2025 (est.) | 31,980 | ▼ | −1.1% |
U.S. Decennial Census; 1790-1960 1900-1990; 1990-2000 2010

Evangeline Parish, Louisiana – Racial and ethnic composition Note: the US Census treats Hispanic/Latino as an ethnic category. This table excludes Latinos from the racial categories and assigns them to a separate category. Hispanics/Latinos may be of any race.
| Race / Ethnicity (NH = Non-Hispanic) | Pop 1980 | Pop 1990 | Pop 2000 | Pop 2010 | Pop 2020 | % 1980 | % 1990 | % 2000 | % 2010 | % 2020 |
|---|---|---|---|---|---|---|---|---|---|---|
| White alone (NH) | 24,853 | 24,235 | 24,730 | 23,071 | 21,162 | 74.54% | 72.83% | 69.79% | 67.89% | 65.42% |
| Black or African American alone (NH) | 7,856 | 8,645 | 10,041 | 9,565 | 8,609 | 23.56% | 25.98% | 28.34% | 28.15% | 26.61% |
| Native American or Alaska Native alone (NH) | 19 | 30 | 75 | 98 | 45 | 0.06% | 0.09% | 0.21% | 0.29% | 0.14% |
| Asian alone (NH) | 41 | 38 | 51 | 112 | 183 | 0.12% | 0.11% | 0.14% | 0.33% | 0.57% |
| Native Hawaiian or Pacific Islander alone (NH) | x | x | 3 | 3 | 2 | x | x | 0.01% | 0.01% | 0.01% |
| Other race alone (NH) | 24 | 56 | 34 | 33 | 91 | 0.07% | 0.17% | 0.10% | 0.10% | 0.28% |
| Mixed race or Multiracial (NH) | x | x | 132 | 326 | 922 | x | x | 0.37% | 0.96% | 2.85% |
| Hispanic or Latino (any race) | 550 | 270 | 368 | 776 | 1,336 | 1.65% | 0.81% | 1.04% | 2.28% | 4.13% |
| Total | 33,343 | 33,274 | 35,434 | 33,984 | 32,350 | 100.00% | 100.00% | 100.00% | 100.00% | 100.00% |

As of the 2020 United States census, there were 32,350 people, 12,172 households, and 7,739 families residing in the parish. The most reported ancestries were African American (14.4%), English (13.1%), French (7.1%), Cajun (2.9%), Irish (2.5%), and German (2.1%).

== Education ==
Public Schools in Evangeline Parish are operated by the Evangeline Parish School Board.

- Bayou Chicot Elementary School (Grades PK-8) (Ville Platte)
- Chataignier Elementary School (Grades PK-8) (Chataignier)
- James Stephens Montessori School (Grades PK-6) (Ville Platte)
- Mamou Elementary School (Grades PK-4) (Mamou)
- Vidrine Elementary School (Grades PK-8) (Ville Platte)
- Ville Platte Elementary School (Grades PK-4) (Ville Platte)
- W. W. Stewart Elementary (Grades PK-4) (Basile)
- Basile High School (Grades 5–12) (Basile)
- Mamou High School (Grades 5–12) (Mamou)
- Pine Prairie High School (Grades 9–12) (Pine Prairie)
- Ville Platte High School (Grades 5–12) (Ville Platte)
- Evangeline Central School (Grades 4–12) (Ville Platte)

Evangeline Parish is also served by the Diocese of Lafayette with one school:

- Sacred Heart School (Grades K-12) (Ville Platte)

Additionally, Evangeline Parish is served by one unaffiliated private school:

- Christian Heritage Academy (Grade K) (Ville Platte)

Evangeline Parish is served by one institutions of higher education:

- South Louisiana Community College service area, C. B. Coreil Campus (Ville Platte

== Notable people ==
- Amédé Ardoin, Creole singer and Cajun accordion virtuoso
- Danny Ardoin, former MLB catcher
- Dewey Balfa, Cajun fiddler
- Jeffery Broussard, zydeco musician
- Edgar Chatman, former professional baseball player
- Harry Choates, Cajun fiddler
- Rene L. De Rouen, former US Representative from Louisiana's 7th congressional district from 1927-1940
- Winston De Ville - noted genealogist and publisher of hundreds of articles and numerous books
- Austin Deculus, NFL offensive lineman
- J. Douglas Deshotel, Roman Catholic bishop
- Eric LaFleur, lawyer and Senator and sponsor of several important bills and represented historic Senate Resolution #30
- Joseph Verbis Lafleur, Roman Catholic priest and US Army chaplain and officer who died in the sinking of the SS Shinyo Maru during World War II who is also in the preliminary stages of canonization.
- Ladislas Lazaro, former US Representative from Louisiana's 7th congressional district from 1913-1927.
- Barry Manuel, former professional baseball pitcher
- Tommy McClelland, athletic director at Rice University
- Jimmy C. Newman, Cajun and country music singer-songwriter
- Austin Pitre, Cajun musician
- Ronald G. Richard, retired Marine Corps major general and former commandant of Camp Lejeune
- Steve Riley, accordion player and co-founder of Steve Riley and the Mamou Playboys
- Floyd Soileau, record producer
- Leo Soileau, Cajun musician and recording artist
- Keith Sonnier, artist and sculptor
- T. Ashton Thompson, US Representative from Louisiana's 7th congressional district from 1953-1965
- Arthur Vidrine, former dean of Louisiana State University Medical School in New Orleans and physician who operated on former Louisiana governor and then US Senator Huey P. Long after he suffered mortal wounds in an assassination attempt in 1935
- Clyde Vidrine, famous bodyguard for former Louisiana governor Edwin Edwards

== Politics ==
United States presidential election results for Evangeline Parish, Louisiana
| Year | Republican | | Democratic | | Third party(ies) | |
| Year | No. | % | No. | % | No. | % |
|---|---|---|---|---|---|---|
| 1912 | 31 | 5.68% | 457 | 83.70% | 58 | 10.62% |
| 1916 | 26 | 2.99% | 808 | 92.77% | 37 | 4.25% |
| 1920 | 587 | 51.99% | 542 | 48.01% | 0 | 0.00% |
| 1924 | 153 | 20.21% | 603 | 79.66% | 1 | 0.13% |
| 1928 | 300 | 13.81% | 1,873 | 86.19% | 0 | 0.00% |
| 1932 | 52 | 1.64% | 3,115 | 98.36% | 0 | 0.00% |
| 1936 | 331 | 8.68% | 3,484 | 91.32% | 0 | 0.00% |
| 1940 | 220 | 5.81% | 3,569 | 94.19% | 0 | 0.00% |
| 1944 | 275 | 8.32% | 3,029 | 91.68% | 0 | 0.00% |
| 1948 | 206 | 3.57% | 1,149 | 19.90% | 4,418 | 76.53% |
| 1952 | 2,445 | 41.84% | 3,398 | 58.16% | 0 | 0.00% |
| 1956 | 2,170 | 38.20% | 3,336 | 58.73% | 174 | 3.06% |
| 1960 | 1,105 | 11.32% | 7,865 | 80.55% | 794 | 8.13% |
| 1964 | 3,975 | 39.21% | 6,163 | 60.79% | 0 | 0.00% |
| 1968 | 1,549 | 13.40% | 2,647 | 22.90% | 7,362 | 63.70% |
| 1972 | 5,523 | 60.03% | 2,919 | 31.72% | 759 | 8.25% |
| 1976 | 3,715 | 32.14% | 7,578 | 65.56% | 265 | 2.29% |
| 1980 | 7,412 | 51.26% | 6,722 | 46.48% | 327 | 2.26% |
| 1984 | 8,680 | 54.78% | 6,981 | 44.06% | 183 | 1.16% |
| 1988 | 7,437 | 48.29% | 7,693 | 49.95% | 270 | 1.75% |
| 1992 | 5,147 | 31.43% | 8,564 | 52.30% | 2,665 | 16.27% |
| 1996 | 5,278 | 35.53% | 7,847 | 52.83% | 1,729 | 11.64% |
| 2000 | 7,290 | 53.56% | 5,763 | 42.34% | 559 | 4.11% |
| 2004 | 7,949 | 56.86% | 5,757 | 41.18% | 273 | 1.95% |
| 2008 | 9,793 | 61.30% | 5,853 | 36.64% | 330 | 2.07% |
| 2012 | 10,181 | 64.56% | 5,330 | 33.80% | 259 | 1.64% |
| 2016 | 10,360 | 69.61% | 4,208 | 28.28% | 314 | 2.11% |
| 2020 | 11,053 | 71.72% | 4,158 | 26.98% | 201 | 1.30% |
| 2024 | 10,483 | 73.95% | 3,526 | 24.87% | 167 | 1.18% |

For most of the 20th Century, Evangeline was a Democratic-leaning parish, voting Republican only in landslide elections such as 1972, 1980 and 1984. However, like other Acadian parishes with large Cajun populations, Evangeline turned sharply right in the 21st century based on cultural issues and Democrats' discomfort with the oil and gas industry.

== See also ==
- National Register of Historic Places listings in Evangeline Parish, Louisiana

== Sources ==
- Title: The Cajunization of French Louisiana: Forging a Regional Identity. Authors: Trepanier, Cecyle Source: Geographical Journal; Jul 91, Vol. 157 Issue 2, p161, 11p, 2 charts, 10 maps
- French, Cajun, Creole, Houma : a primer on francophone Louisiana / Carl A. Brasseaux.
- https://web.archive.org/web/20091026030323/http://geocities.com/old_time_time/many.htm
- A history of Evangeline : its land, its men and its women who made it a beautiful place to live, Robert Gahn, Sr.; edited by Revon John Reed, Sr. Baton Rouge, LA : Claitor's, c 1972
- La Voix des Prairies, Evangeline Genealogical and Historical Society.
- Bonnes Nouvelles : good news about people, places and things in Evangeline Parish. Ville Platte, La. : Bonnes Nouvelles, 1993-
- Fort Toulouse : The French Outpost at the Alabamas on the Coosa, Gregory A. Thomas
- Louisiana's French Creole Culinary & Linguistic Traditions: Facts vs. Fiction Before And Since Cajunization, John laFleur II, Brian Costello w/ Dr. Ina Fandrich 2013
- Louisiana's Creole French People, Our Food, Language & Culture: 500 Years of Culture copyright 2014, John laFleur II

== National Guard ==
The 1086th Transportation Company of the 165th CSS (Combat Service Support) Battalion resides in Ville Platte, Louisiana. This unit belongs to the 139th RSG (regional support group).
