= L'Anse Grise, Louisiana =

Unincorporated community in Louisiana, U.S.

Coordinates: 30°42′50″N 92°25′41″W

L'Anse Grise (French for 'Gray Cove') (Note: Sometimes erroneously translated into English as 'Gray Point'.) is an unincorporated community in Evangeline Parish, Louisiana, United States. The community is located on LA Hwy 13, approximately 1.5 miles north of the intersection of LA Hwy 10.

== Etymology ==
The Louisiana French word anse ('cove') in this case refers to an "area of land partially enclosed by woodland and opening onto a prairie" as opposed to an actual body of water. The word grise is simply the feminine form of gris ('gray'). It is not known when L'Anse Grise acquired its name. Its earliest recorded use, found in the Vidrine Elementary School, dates from 1928.

== History ==
L'Anse Grise was homesteaded and settled in the mid-19th century by Dalicourt Guillory, Marius Landreneau, Francois Vidrine, Jean Baptiste Chapman, Jean Baptiste Ortego, and others.
