= 1980 United States presidential election in Louisiana =

- November 4, 1980

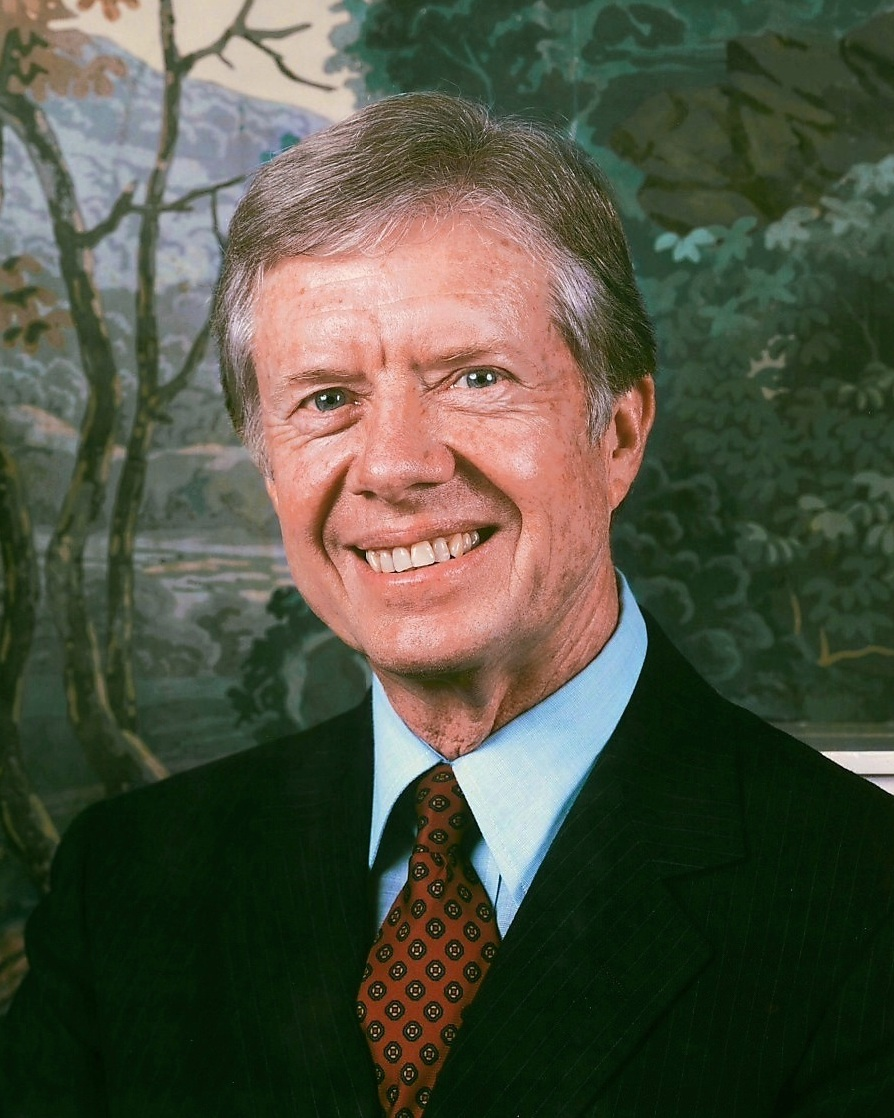
Nominee	Ronald Reagan	Jimmy Carter
Party	Republican	Democratic
Home state	California	Georgia
Running mate	George H. W. Bush	Walter Mondale
Electoral vote	10	0
Popular vote	792,853	708,453
Percentage	51.20%	45.75%
Parish results
Reagan
40–50%
50–60%
60–70%
Carter
40–50%
50–60%
60–70%
President before election
Jimmy Carter
Democratic
Elected President
Ronald Reagan
Republican

The 1980 United States presidential election in Louisiana took place on November 4, 1980. All 50 states and The District of Columbia were part of the 1980 United States presidential election. State voters chose ten electors to the Electoral College, who voted for president and vice president.

Louisiana was won by former California Governor Ronald Reagan (R) by 5.45 percentage points. As of the 2024 presidential election, this is the last election in which Livingston Parish and Beauregard Parish voted for a Democratic presidential candidate.

== Campaign ==
Among white voters, 63% supported Reagan while 33% supported Carter.

== Results ==
Presidential Candidate	Running Mate	Party	Electoral Vote (EV)	Popular Vote (PV)	
Ronald Reagan of California	George H. W. Bush	Republican	10	792,853	51.20%
Jimmy Carter (incumbent)	Walter Mondale (incumbent)	Democratic	0	708,453	45.75%
John B. Anderson	Patrick Lucey	Independent	0	26,345	1.70%
John Rarick	Eileen Shearer	American Independent	0	10,333	0.67%
Ed Clark	David Koch	Libertarian	0	8,240	0.53%
Barry Commoner	LaDonna Harris	Citizens	0	1,584	0.10%
Clifton DeBerry	Matilde Zimmermann	Socialist Workers	0	783	0.05%

=== Results by parish ===
Parish	Ronald Reagan Republican		Jimmy Carter Democratic		John B. Anderson Independent		John Rarick American Independent		Ed Clark Libertarian		Various candidates Other parties		Margin		Total
Parish	#	%	#	%	#	%	#	%	#	%	#	%	#	%	Total
Acadia	11,533	52.19%	9,948	45.01%	416	1.88%	58	0.26%	125	0.57%	20	0.09%	1,585	7.18%	22,100
Allen	3,328	34.80%	6,057	63.33%	110	1.15%	19	0.20%	34	0.36%	16	0.17%	-2,729	-28.53%	9,564
Ascension	7,238	35.83%	12,381	61.29%	286	1.42%	139	0.69%	128	0.63%	28	0.14%	-5,143	-25.46%	20,200
Assumption	4,001	44.10%	4,679	51.57%	153	1.69%	164	1.81%	47	0.52%	29	0.32%	-678	-7.47%	9,073
Avoyelles	8,216	51.12%	7,174	44.64%	190	1.18%	352	2.19%	95	0.59%	44	0.27%	1,042	6.48%	16,071
Beauregard	5,250	47.47%	5,556	50.24%	163	1.47%	21	0.19%	62	0.56%	7	0.06%	-306	-2.77%	11,059
Bienville	3,508	45.15%	4,123	53.06%	51	0.66%	46	0.59%	24	0.31%	18	0.23%	-615	-7.91%	7,770
Bossier	16,515	62.70%	9,377	35.60%	327	1.24%	18	0.07%	78	0.30%	24	0.09%	7,138	27.10%	26,339
Caddo	51,202	57.41%	36,422	40.84%	1,128	1.26%	82	0.09%	272	0.30%	78	0.09%	14,780	16.57%	89,184
Calcasieu	27,600	42.55%	35,446	54.65%	1,259	1.94%	111	0.17%	387	0.60%	56	0.09%	-7,846	-12.10%	64,859
Caldwell	2,653	57.91%	1,786	38.99%	43	0.94%	68	1.48%	25	0.55%	6	0.13%	867	18.92%	4,581
Cameron	1,449	38.15%	2,221	58.48%	82	2.16%	7	0.18%	35	0.92%	4	0.11%	-772	-20.33%	3,798
Catahoula	2,942	53.19%	2,414	43.64%	38	0.69%	98	1.77%	31	0.56%	8	0.14%	528	9.55%	5,531
Claiborne	3,538	50.01%	3,443	48.67%	53	0.75%	8	0.11%	23	0.33%	9	0.13%	95	1.34%	7,074
Concordia	4,933	54.20%	3,956	43.46%	52	0.57%	110	1.21%	35	0.38%	16	0.18%	977	10.74%	9,102
DeSoto	4,349	42.11%	5,861	56.75%	49	0.47%	18	0.17%	37	0.36%	13	0.13%	-1,512	-14.64%	10,327
East Baton Rouge	71,063	53.36%	57,442	43.13%	3,312	2.49%	380	0.29%	845	0.63%	126	0.09%	13,621	10.23%	133,168
East Carroll	1,867	44.13%	2,283	53.96%	24	0.57%	46	1.09%	5	0.12%	6	0.14%	-416	-9.83%	4,231
East Feliciana	2,650	38.56%	4,033	58.68%	53	0.77%	72	1.05%	44	0.64%	21	0.31%	-1,383	-20.12%	6,873
Evangeline	7,412	51.26%	6,722	46.48%	160	1.11%	52	0.36%	88	0.61%	27	0.19%	690	4.78%	14,461
Franklin	5,301	54.38%	4,177	42.85%	65	0.67%	155	1.59%	29	0.30%	21	0.22%	1,124	11.53%	9,748
Grant	3,611	50.52%	3,290	46.03%	77	1.08%	136	1.90%	32	0.45%	2	0.03%	321	4.49%	7,148
Iberia	14,273	57.03%	9,681	38.68%	410	1.64%	471	1.88%	149	0.60%	44	0.18%	4,592	18.35%	25,028
Iberville	4,463	31.57%	9,361	66.23%	172	1.22%	54	0.38%	65	0.46%	20	0.14%	-4,898	-34.66%	14,135
Jackson	3,923	50.75%	3,609	46.69%	56	0.72%	110	1.42%	20	0.26%	12	0.16%	314	4.06%	7,730
Jefferson	99,403	64.09%	50,870	32.80%	3,578	2.31%	220	0.14%	920	0.59%	120	0.08%	48,533	31.29%	155,111
Jefferson Davis	5,667	46.73%	6,140	50.63%	201	1.66%	32	0.26%	67	0.55%	20	0.16%	-473	-3.90%	12,127
Lafayette	31,429	58.72%	19,694	36.79%	1,263	2.36%	638	1.19%	407	0.76%	95	0.18%	11,735	21.93%	53,526
Lafourche	14,951	48.51%	14,222	46.15%	675	2.19%	574	1.86%	326	1.06%	70	0.23%	729	2.36%	30,818
LaSalle	3,792	57.16%	2,665	40.17%	61	0.92%	90	1.36%	23	0.35%	3	0.05%	1,127	16.99%	6,634
Lincoln	7,515	55.79%	5,598	41.56%	177	1.31%	98	0.73%	59	0.44%	23	0.17%	1,917	14.23%	13,470
Livingston	10,666	47.18%	11,319	50.06%	287	1.27%	192	0.85%	120	0.53%	25	0.11%	-653	-2.88%	22,609
Madison	2,531	42.70%	3,264	55.06%	16	0.27%	86	1.45%	10	0.17%	21	0.35%	-733	-12.36%	5,928
Morehouse	7,254	58.51%	4,856	39.17%	65	0.52%	181	1.46%	27	0.22%	14	0.11%	2,398	19.34%	12,397
Natchitoches	6,668	46.99%	7,102	50.05%	158	1.11%	190	1.34%	44	0.31%	27	0.19%	-434	-3.06%	14,189
Orleans	74,302	39.54%	106,858	56.87%	4,246	2.26%	941	0.50%	1,015	0.54%	542	0.29%	-32,556	-17.33%	187,904
Ouachita	29,799	62.98%	16,306	34.46%	495	1.05%	502	1.06%	166	0.35%	46	0.10%	13,493	28.52%	47,314
Plaquemines	5,489	54.46%	4,318	42.84%	154	1.53%	36	0.36%	57	0.57%	25	0.25%	1,171	11.62%	10,079
Pointe Coupee	3,667	35.73%	6,395	62.31%	105	1.02%	39	0.38%	41	0.40%	16	0.16%	-2,728	-26.58%	10,263
Rapides	25,576	55.24%	19,436	41.98%	530	1.14%	517	1.12%	197	0.43%	46	0.10%	6,140	13.26%	46,302
Red River	2,147	43.06%	2,776	55.68%	29	0.58%	14	0.28%	14	0.28%	6	0.12%	-629	-12.62%	4,986
Richland	4,772	54.57%	3,745	42.83%	48	0.55%	125	1.43%	29	0.33%	25	0.29%	1,027	11.74%	8,744
Sabine	4,265	44.50%	5,100	53.21%	74	0.77%	110	1.15%	25	0.26%	11	0.11%	-835	-8.71%	9,585
St. Bernard	19,410	60.53%	11,367	35.45%	616	1.92%	374	1.17%	208	0.65%	90	0.28%	8,043	25.08%	32,065
St. Charles	6,779	44.83%	7,898	52.23%	283	1.87%	22	0.15%	112	0.74%	29	0.19%	-1,119	-7.40%	15,123
St. Helena	1,531	31.55%	3,183	65.60%	42	0.87%	51	1.05%	29	0.60%	16	0.33%	-1,652	-34.05%	4,852
St. James	3,429	34.90%	6,206	63.17%	113	1.15%	21	0.21%	39	0.40%	16	0.16%	-2,777	-28.27%	9,824
St. John the Baptist	5,819	41.98%	7,647	55.17%	261	1.88%	26	0.19%	89	0.64%	19	0.14%	-1,828	-13.19%	13,861
St. Landry	14,940	45.72%	17,125	52.41%	332	1.02%	88	0.27%	129	0.39%	64	0.20%	-2,185	-6.69%	32,678
St. Martin	6,701	44.55%	7,760	51.60%	281	1.87%	146	0.97%	97	0.64%	55	0.37%	-1,059	-7.05%	15,040
St. Mary	10,378	48.03%	10,506	48.63%	339	1.57%	209	0.97%	152	0.70%	22	0.10%	-128	-0.60%	21,606
St. Tammany	27,214	63.74%	14,161	33.17%	872	2.04%	139	0.33%	260	0.61%	52	0.12%	13,053	30.57%	42,698
Tangipahoa	15,187	48.46%	15,272	48.73%	491	1.57%	173	0.55%	176	0.56%	43	0.14%	-85	-0.27%	31,342
Tensas	1,645	43.46%	2,046	54.06%	25	0.66%	52	1.37%	9	0.24%	8	0.21%	-401	-10.60%	3,785
Terrebonne	16,644	58.03%	10,804	37.67%	559	1.95%	424	1.48%	214	0.75%	36	0.13%	5,840	20.36%	28,681
Union	5,130	55.77%	3,841	41.76%	60	0.65%	125	1.36%	30	0.33%	12	0.13%	1,289	14.01%	9,198
Vermilion	10,481	48.96%	9,743	45.51%	473	2.21%	510	2.38%	174	0.81%	28	0.13%	738	3.45%	21,409
Vernon	5,869	43.68%	7,198	53.57%	167	1.24%	138	1.03%	50	0.37%	14	0.10%	-1,329	-9.89%	13,436
Washington	8,681	44.58%	10,413	53.48%	170	0.87%	113	0.58%	69	0.35%	26	0.13%	-1,732	-8.90%	19,472
Webster	8,865	50.24%	8,568	48.55%	118	0.67%	20	0.11%	54	0.31%	22	0.12%	297	1.69%	17,647
West Baton Rouge	2,828	36.48%	4,739	61.12%	117	1.51%	38	0.49%	25	0.32%	6	0.08%	-1,911	-24.64%	7,753
West Carroll	3,430	60.05%	2,118	37.08%	38	0.67%	100	1.75%	23	0.40%	3	0.05%	1,312	22.97%	5,712
West Feliciana	1,237	33.23%	2,341	62.90%	40	1.07%	78	2.10%	20	0.54%	6	0.16%	-1,104	-29.67%	3,722
Winn	3,944	52.26%	3,411	45.20%	57	0.76%	106	1.40%	19	0.25%	10	0.13%	533	7.06%	7,547
Totals	792,853	51.20%	708,453	45.75%	26,345	1.70%	10,333	0.67%	8,240	0.53%	2,367	0.15%	84,400	5.45%	1,548,591

==== Parishes that flipped from Democratic to Republican ====
- Avoyelles
- Acadia
- Catahoula
- Concordia
- Evangeline
- Grant
- Jackson
- Lafourche
- Rapides
- St. Bernard
- Vermilion
- West Carroll
- Winn

== See also ==
- United States presidential elections in Louisiana

== Works cited ==
- Black, Earl; Black, Merle (1992). The Vital South: How Presidents Are Elected. Harvard University Press. ISBN 0674941306.
