= Rhonda Butler =

American politician and businesswoman

Member of the Louisiana House of Representatives from the 38th district
- Incumbent
- Assumed office January 13, 2020
- Preceded by: H. Bernard LeBas

Personal details
- Born: Rhonda Gaye Butler Turkey Creek, Louisiana, U.S.
- Party: Republican

Rhonda Gaye Butler is an American politician and businesswoman serving as a member of the Louisiana House of Representatives from the 38th district. She assumed office on January 13, 2020.

== Early life and education ==
Butler was born and raised in Turkey Creek, Louisiana and attended Bayou Chicot High School in nearby Ville Platte. She graduated from the Bolton Beauty College.

== Career ==
Outside of politics, Butler operates Butler & Company Tree and Storm Recover and Gobble Gully Paint Ball. She was elected to the Louisiana House of Representatives in January 2020. In November 2020, Butler sponsored legislation that would require the Louisiana Department of Health to set rules granting family members increased access to residents of nursing homes and other adult residential care facilities. In May 2021, Butler was one of 48 House members who voted against a bill that would tax the sale of marijuana in Louisiana, effectively killing efforts to legalize recreational marijuana in the state.
