= Reddell, Louisiana =

- Census-designated place
- Location of Reddell in Louisiana
- Coordinates: 30°40′07″N 92°25′37″W
- Country: United States
- State: Louisiana
- Parish: Evangeline

Area
  - Total: 3.81 sq mi (9.86 km^{2})
  - Land: 3.81 sq mi (9.86 km^{2})
  - Water: 0 sq mi (0.00 km^{2})
- Elevation: 69 ft (21 m)

Population (2020)
  - Total: 904
  - Density: 238/sq mi (91.7/km^{2})
- FIPS code: 22-63890
- GNIS feature ID: 2586705

Reddell is a census-designated place and unincorporated community in Evangeline Parish, Louisiana, United States. As of the 2020 census, Reddell had a population of 904. It is located approximately 2 miles (3 km) north of Mamou along Louisiana Highway 13.

Reddell has a post office (ZIP code 70580), grocery store, and one of the largest rice drier elevators in the state.

== Demographics ==
Historical population
Census	Pop.	Note	%±
2010	733		—
2020	904		23.3%
U.S. Decennial Census

Reddell was first listed as a census designated place in the 2010 U.S. census.
