= Centerville, Evangeline Parish, Louisiana =

Centerville, Louisiana
- Unincorporated community
- Location within Louisiana Location within the United States
- Coordinates: 30°53′36″N 92°18′35″W
- Country: United States
- State: Louisiana
- Parish: Evangeline
- Elevation: 52 ft (16 m)
- Time zone: UTC-6 (Central (CST))
  - Summer (DST): UTC-5 (CDT)
- Area code: 337
- GNIS feature ID: 533850

Centerville is an unincorporated community in Evangeline Parish, Louisiana, United States.
