= Drastik =

American rapper

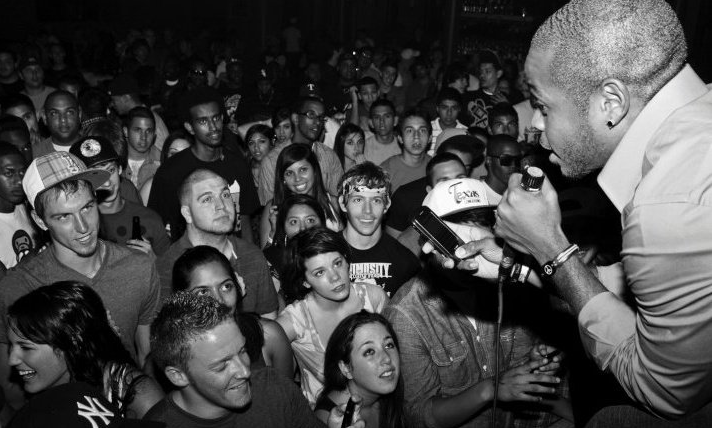
- Drastik during a performance in Austin, TX

Background information
- Born: Gerald DeLoach Jr. February 19, 1989 (age 37); Mamou, Louisiana, U.S.
- Origin: Austin, Texas, U.S.
- Genres: Hip-Hop, Soul, Rock
- Occupation: Rapper
- Years active: 2009-present
- Label: Home Team Records
- Website: Official website

Gerald DeLoach Jr. (born February 19, 1989), better known by his stage name Drastik, is an American Hip-Hop artist from Austin, Texas.

== Biography ==
=== Early life and career ===
Drastik was born in Mamou, Louisiana and spent most of his childhood in Oakdale and New Orleans with his family. At an early age he moved to the Southwest side of Houston, Texas. Growing up with a father who operated a recording studio and was a part of rap group himself, Drastik took to music at a young age. At the age of 11 he wrote his first song and subsequently began the rap group DSD with two friends, DICE and J. Maine. The group recorded an album and performed together for 4 years but after contractual issues and a shelved album the group disbanded.

While attending B.F. Terry High School, Drastik met David R. “DC” Canales and his brother Mike Canales and began Home Team Records. Home Team consisted of various locally talented artists who collaborated to release a number of mixtapes and eventually formed a 5-member group under the name Deuce 81 G.A.G.E. Deuce 81 G.A.G.E. released an LP and DVD titled “G.A.G.E.” along with a volume of mixtapes entitled “Get This Paper”. The group collectively decided to part ways and Drastik went on to release a project titled “Birth of Modern Military Thought” with former group member DICE, who he reconnected with while in college at U of H.

After the release of the mixtape, Drastik went on to release one track every day in the month of May 2009 totaling 31 tracks, which was promoted as the “Daily Downloads”. The Daily Downloads along with highlight videos of his performances landed him many opening spots in Austin with artists such as Trey Songz, Dorrough, Del The Funky Homosapien, Wiz Khalifa, and Curren$y.

With his newfound success in the Austin market, Drastik moved to Austin shortly before his Texas tour with J. Cole in January 2010.

=== 2010-present: Mixtapes, Tours, & "Something to Say" ===
In January 2010 Drastik toured with J. Cole on The J. Cole Texas Tour. During the spring of 2010, he toured with Curren$y, Pac Div and XV on The LRG Home Grown Tour. In the fall of 2010, he toured with Big Sean, Mickey Factz, and FreeSol on select dates of the What U Doin College tour.
During the spring of 2010, Drastik and fellow Austin Hip-Hop artist Kevin Jack, released "Circus Mirrors", a 7-track EP featuring production from Big Gigantic and Ratatat. In December 2010, Drastik was named 1 of 5 Austin Hip-Hop artists to watch in 2011 by the Austin Examiner. In January 2011 Drastik released his debut solo EP, titled "Something to Say" exclusively produced by long-time collaborator, 2wentyWon. Since its release,"Something to Say" has received positive and rave reviews from many media publications which has further propelled him to the forefront of the Texas music scene.

== Personal life ==
Drastik is the older of two boys born to Kathy Green and Gerald DeLoach Sr. He has one brother, Katlyn DeLoach, and sister, Jordan DeLoach out of his father's second marriage.

== Discography ==
EP's

- Something to Say (2011)

Mixtapes

- Circus Mirrors with Kevin Jack (2010)

== Awards & Recognitions ==
- Placed 2nd in The Recording Conservatory of Austin's "Best Unsigned Band" Competition
- 2011 Austin Music Awards
  - Best Performing Hip-Hop Artist or DJ [Nominated]
- Top 10 SXSW Bands in 2011 by Study Breaks Magazine
- 5 Austin Hip-Hop Artists to Watch in 2011 by The Austin Examiner
