= Tit Galop Pour Mamou =

Single by The Balfa Brothers

from the album Balfa Brothers Play Traditional Cajun Music, Vols. 1-2
- Recorded: 1965
- Genre: Cajun
- Length: 2:05
- Label: Swallow Records 6011, Swallow Records 6019
- Songwriter(s): Dewey Balfa

"Tit Galop Pour Mamou" (English: either Canter to Mamou or Giddy-Yap to Mamou) is a Cajun folk song with words and music by Dewey Balfa. The tune behind Joe South's "Games People Play" resembles the tune of "Tit Galop Pour Mamou" to some extent.

A recording of the song by Mamou Master was used on the soundtrack of the 1991 film Scorchers. The song was also recorded as the title cut of a 1992 album by Steve Riley and the Mamou Playboys.

The album was first released 1965 and is considered Volume 1. Volume 2 was released in 1974 however, in 1994, both were re-released as a double album set.

== Content ==
The song's narrator tells of a trip to the Louisiana town of Mamou, where he sells his mule and wagon for 15 cents to buy candies for children and sugar and coffee for older people.
