= Winston De Ville =

American historian (1937–2025)

- Born: August 8, 1937; Evangeline Parish, Louisiana, U.S.
- Died: March 24, 2025 (aged 87); Opelousas, Louisiana, U.S.
- Education: Louisiana College; Louisiana State University
- Occupation: Historian

Winston De Ville (August 8, 1937 – March 24, 2025) was an American historian focusing on colonial Mississippi Valley/provincial Louisiana genealogy and history.

According to scholar P. William Filby, "By far, Winston De Ville is the earliest of Louisiana's prolific genealogical writers... I can think of few genealogical authors with so many works to their names... as important to the historian as to the genealogist... [His] quality productivity in so few years is remarkable."

== Background ==
De Ville was born August 8, 1937, in Evangeline Parish, Louisiana, son of Dalvis Joseph De Ville and Olevia Marie Johnson. In 1959 he was graduated magna cum laude from Louisiana College with majors in Piano and French and minors in organ and journalism. He received his master's degree in history from Louisiana State University in 1965.

De Ville died in Opelousas, St. Landry Parish, Louisiana on March 24, 2025, at the age of 87.

== Career ==
An author, publisher, translator and archivist, De Ville has been recognized by the state of Louisiana for his 1961 volunteer effort to create the first guide to materials at the Louisiana State Archives.

In 1970, De Ville was inducted as a Fellow of the American Society of Genealogists, an organization limited to fifty members worldwide, selected on the basis of quantity and quality of published works. De Ville appeared in the Marquis' Who's Who in America in 1998. He was a member of Mexico's Academia Mexicana de Genealogía y Heráldica.

Beginning in 1976, De Ville was often called upon as a consultant in court cases involving genealogical and historical evidence. Among his clients were the State of Louisiana and the U.S. Department of Justice's Criminal Division.

In 1977, he was elected founding president of Friends of Louisiana Archives; that organization's vigorous campaign resulted in the state's first archives building.

Publications include approximately 100 monographs and over 300 articles published in leading academic journals throughout the United States. The third edition of Winston De Ville: A Bibliography of Genealogical and Other Writings was due in 2017.

Archives of De Ville's papers (dating from 1944) were begun in 1991 at Louisiana State University; additions are made regularly.

For many years De Ville owned Polyanthos, Inc., and Provincial Press, which produced many genealogical and historical publications.

In 2014, he was named a Penrose Associate of the American Philosophical Society.

Winston De Ville died at Opelousas, Louisiana, on 24 March 2025.
