= Arthur Vidrine =

American physician

- Born: December 20, 1896
- Died: December 20, 1955 (aged 59)
- Education: Tulane University
- Occupation: Physician

Arthur Vidrine (December 20, 1896 - December 20, 1955) was a physician from Ville Platte, the seat of Evangeline Parish in south Louisiana, who was best known for having operated on Democratic U.S. Senator Huey Pierce Long Jr., after Long was shot on September 8, 1935, in the Louisiana State Capitol in Baton Rouge, presumably by another young physician, Carl A. Weiss.

A veteran of World War I, Vidrine was educated at Tulane University in New Orleans, the University of Oxford (where he was a Rhodes Scholar), and at hospitals in London and Paris. Then Governor Long first appointed Vidrine superintendent of Charity Hospital in New Orleans. Then in May 1931, Long named Vidrine dean of the newly established Louisiana State University Medical School in New Orleans.

After Senator Long was shot, Vidrine performed an operation to repair two small wounds in the colon. He then sutured the abdomen closed. Two surgical experts who had been called from New Orleans to operate on Long were delayed by an automobile accident. Vidrine was later criticized by other doctors for having failed to recognize a kidney wound that caused internal bleeding and which ultimately led to Long's death. However, due to the lack of technology at the time, it was easier to make that mistake. He also operated under extreme pressure and was unable to operate well with the added stress of such a high profile patient.

Vidrine left New Orleans due to the mishap and resided in Ville Platte, Louisiana with his family. He now has one remaining child of 3, his eldest daughter and child. His family moved back to New Orleans while he lived in Ville Platte, visiting each other often.

== Sources ==
- 'Double Bed Charity', Time (29 November 1937)
- Richard D. White, Jr., Kingfish (New York: Random House, 2006), pp. 50, 265, 268
- Glen Jeansonne, Messiah of the Masses: Huey P. Long and the Great Depression (New York: Longman, 1993), p. 175
