= Pine Prairie High School =

High school in Louisiana

Location
- 1557 Speedy Campbell Drive; Pine Prairie, (Evangeline Parish), Louisiana 70576; United States
- Coordinates: 30.7846°N 92.4231°W

Information
- Type: Public high school
- School district: Evangeline Parish School Board
- Principal: Toby Doucet
- Staff: 56.83 (FTE)
- Enrollment: 802 (2023-2024)
- Student to teacher ratio: 14.11
- Colors: Black and orange
- Mascot: Panthers

Pine Prairie High School is an elementary and high school in Pine Prairie, Evangeline Parish, Louisiana, United States serving grades PK-5 and 9-12.

== Athletics ==
Pine Prairie High athletics competes in the LHSAA.
