= Pine Prairie, Louisiana =

- Village
- Location of Pine Prairie in Evangeline Parish, Louisiana.

- Location of Louisiana in the United States
- Coordinates: 30°46′54″N 92°25′20″W
- Country: United States
- State: Louisiana
- Parish: Evangeline

Area
  - Total: 1.62 sq mi (4.20 km^{2})
  - Land: 1.61 sq mi (4.18 km^{2})
  - Water: 0.012 sq mi (0.03 km^{2})
- Elevation: 121 ft (37 m)

Population (2020)
  - Total: 1,490
  - Density: 923.8/sq mi (356.69/km^{2})
- Time zone: UTC-6 (CST)
  - Summer (DST): UTC-5 (CDT)
- ZIP code: 70576
- Area code: 337
- FIPS code: 22-60495
- GNIS feature ID: 2407521

Pine Prairie is a village in Evangeline Parish, Louisiana, United States. As of the 2020 census, Pine Prairie had a population of 1,490.

== Geography ==
Pine Prairie is located north of the center of Evangeline Parish. Louisiana Highway 13 passes through the village, leading north 6 miles (10 km) to Turkey Creek and south 11 miles (18 km) to Mamou. Ville Platte, the parish seat, is 15 miles (24 km) to the southeast.

In 1823 the area was the epicenter of an earthquake which was felt throughout the district.

According to the United States Census Bureau, Pine Prairie has a total area of 1.6 square miles (4.2 km^{2}), of which 0.01 square miles (0.03 km^{2}), or 0.61%, is water.

Pine Prairie Correctional Center is located in the northern part of the village. The village is also home to an ICE detention center where guards pepper sprayed over 100 immigrants for protesting their treatment and which also had an outbreak of mumps.

== Demographics ==
Historical population
Census	Pop.	Note	%±
1960	387		—
1970	515		33.1%
1980	734		42.5%
1990	713		−2.9%
2000	1,087		52.5%
2010	1,610		48.1%
2020	1,490		−7.5%
2025 (est.)	1,554	▲	4.3%
U.S. Decennial Census

As of the census of 2000, there were 1,087 people, 327 households, and 242 families residing in the village. The population density was 813.9 inhabitants per square mile (314.2/km^{2}). There were 367 housing units at an average density of 274.8 per square mile (106.1/km^{2}). The racial makeup of the village was 91.08% White, 7.36% African American, 0.09% Native American, 0.37% Asian, and 1.10% from two or more races. Hispanic or Latino of any race were 1.84% of the population.

There were 327 households, out of which 45.0% had children under the age of 18 living with them, 51.7% were married couples living together, 19.0% had a female householder with no husband present, and 25.7% were non-families. 25.1% of all households were made up of individuals, and 10.7% had someone living alone who was 65 years of age or older. The average household size was 2.64 and the average family size was 3.14.

In the village, the population was spread out, with 27.6% under the age of 18, 9.8% from 18 to 24, 28.4% from 25 to 44, 15.4% from 45 to 64, and 18.9% who were 65 years of age or older. The median age was 35 years. For every 100 females, there were 100.6 males. For every 100 females age 18 and over, there were 105.5 males.

The median income for a household in the village was $21,167, and the median income for a family was $27,292. Males had a median income of $32,375 versus $17,321 for females. The per capita income for the village was $9,735. About 24.2% of families and 29.2% of the population were below the poverty line, including 33.7% of those under age 18 and 22.8% of those age 65 or over.

== Education ==
Public schools in Evangeline Parish are operated by the Evangeline Parish School Board. Pine Prairie High School is located in the village of Pine Prairie and serves students in grades pre-kindergarten through four as well as grades nine through twelve.
