= Tommy McClelland =

American athletic director

Current position
- Title: Athletic director
- Team: Purdue
- Conference: Big Ten

Biographical details
- Born: c. 1982 (age 43–44); Basile, Louisiana, U.S.

Playing career
- 2000–2004: John Carroll University
- Positions: Long snapper, Javelin throw

Administrative career (AD unless noted)
- 2005: Northwestern State (GA)
- 2005–2006: Southland Conference (intern)
- 2006–2007: McNeese State (coordinator)
- 2007–2008: McNeese State (interim AD)
- 2008–2013: McNeese State
- 2013–2020: Louisiana Tech
- 2020–2023: Vanderbilt (deputy AD)
- 2023–2026: Rice
- 2026–present: Purdue

Thomas H. McClelland II (born 1982) is the athletic director at Purdue University. He was previously the athletic director at Rice University.

== Early life and education ==
McClelland was born in Eunice, Louisiana and raised in Basile, Louisiana, graduating from Basile High School. After high school, McClelland attended Northwestern State University in Natchitoches, Louisiana where he was a walk-on on the Demons football team as a long snapper and the track and field team as a javelin thrower, before earning a scholarship his senior season. McClelland graduated from Northwestern State with a bachelor's degree in 2004 and completed his master's degree in sports administration in 2005.

== Career ==
=== Northwestern State ===
McClelland began his athletic administration career at his alma mater, Northwestern State. After completing his undergraduate degree in 2004, he served as an intern for then-NSU athletic director Greg Burke while pursuing his master's degree.

After completing his master's degree, McClelland became the first Southland Conference championships intern before becoming coordinator of athletic events, sales, and marketing at McNeese State University in 2006.

=== McNeese State ===
In 2007, then-McNeese State athletic director Sonny Watkins announced his retirement and McClelland was named interim AD. McClelland was promoted to athletic director in March 2008. At the time he was hired at McNeese, McClelland was the youngest athletic director in all of NCAA Division I at only 26-years old.

While serving as athletic director at McNeese State, McClelland made a national name for himself and his work received praise from athletic administrators all over the country. McClelland and his McNeese staff raised more than $3 million in private donations and he was instrumental in increasing corporate sponsorships to nearly $1 million annually while securing new clients and multi-year sponsorships. During his time at McNeese, he led an improvement in team Academic Progress Rate (APR) that exceeded NCAA targets, set single game and season attendance records in several men's and women's programs, directed $11 million in facility construction and improvements. McNeese State athletic programs also won 11 conference championships under his leadership.

=== Louisiana Tech ===
In July 2013, McClelland was hired as athletic director at Louisiana Tech University. He replaced former athletic director Bruce Van De Velde, who stepped down earlier in the month. He took over as Louisiana Tech was transitioning conference affiliation from the WAC to Conference USA. During his time at Louisiana Tech, the Bulldogs athletic programs experienced one of its most impressive runs since the 1970s. Over that time, the Bulldogs had postseason appearances in football, men's basketball, women's basketball, baseball, softball, golf, and track and field.

In the 2015-16 athletic year, Louisiana Tech joined Florida, Florida State, Ohio State, and Ole Miss as the only five FBS programs with at least nine wins in football, 20 wins in men's basketball, and 40 wins in baseball and was one of only 12 FBS programs to advance to the postseason in each of those three sports. That was followed up when in the 2016-17 athletic year, Louisiana Tech was one of only two non-Power 5 programs with at least nine football wins, 20 men's basketball wins, 35 baseball wins, and 35 softball wins. That same season, Louisiana Tech became only the second Conference USA program to ever finish in the league's top five in football, women's basketball, men's basketball, baseball, softball, and soccer in the same year.

Off the field, nearly 1,200 Louisiana Tech student-athletes were recognized on the Conference USA Commissioner's Honor Roll, including a record 212 in 2018-19, and continued to earn high marks in APR and Graduation Success Rate. McClelland also groomed two future NCAA Division I athletic directors in Ryan Ivey of Stephen F. Austin and Brian White of Florida Atlantic, both of whom served on McClelland's senior staff at Louisiana Tech. Perhaps the most tangible sign of McClelland's impact at Louisiana Tech were the $23 million Davison Athletics Complex and $18 million press box and luxury suites at Joe Aillet Stadium. These two facilities not only changed the landscape of football game days at Louisiana Tech, but also produced more than $1.2 million in additional revenue per year for the athletic department.

=== Vanderbilt ===
In 2020, McClelland left Louisiana Tech to become deputy athletic director for external affairs and revenue generation at Vanderbilt. At Vanderbilt, McClelland provided oversight of the transformational Vandy United campaign, The largest athletics fundraising campaign in Vanderbilt history, Vandy United raised over $300 million to support the construction of new and renovated athletic facilities at the university. In his role, McClelland played a critical role in fundraising and planning projects, while also overseeing the football program and directing the Commodores' marketing and promotional efforts, ticket operations and sales, fan engagement and hospitality, broadcasting and Learfield partnership.

=== Rice ===
On July 30, 2023, Rice University president Reginald DesRoches announced that McClelland would be the school's next director of athletics. He replaced former athletic director Joe Karlgaard, who left Rice for a position in the private sector. McClelland began his tenure as athletic director on August 14, 2023.

== Personal life ==
McClelland met his wife, Jessica, at the NSU Baptist Collegiate Ministry and they were married in December 2002. They have two sons, Lawson and Grayson.

He is also a 2012 graduate of the Executive Program of the Sports Management Institute and attended instruction at the University of North Carolina at Chapel Hill's Kenan-Flagler Business School and the University of Southern California's Marshall School of Business.

In 2021, McClelland and his wife established the Tommy and Jessica McClelland Family Scholarship, investing the initial $10,000 toward the endowment that will benefit Northwestern State student-athletes.

McClelland's son, Lawson, was diagnosed with autism as a child. Louisiana Tech alumnus and member of Brooks & Dunn, Kix Brooks, advised McClelland to bring his son to Monroe Carell, Jr. Children's Hospital at Vanderbilt, where Brooks was the advisory board chair. After spending time there and at Vanderbilt's Kennedy Center, which specializes in treatment and research for autism spectrum disorders, McClelland considered moving closer to the hospital in Nashville before being contacted by Vanderbilt athletic director Candice Lee, eventually resulting in McClelland's hire at Vanderbilt.
