= Turkey Creek, Louisiana =

- Village
- Location of Turkey Creek in Evangeline Parish, Louisiana.

- Location of Louisiana in the United States
- Coordinates: 30°52′36″N 92°24′58″W
- Country: United States
- State: Louisiana
- Parish: Evangeline

Area
  - Total: 2.48 sq mi (6.42 km^{2})
  - Land: 2.48 sq mi (6.42 km^{2})
  - Water: 0 sq mi (0.00 km^{2})
- Elevation: 121 ft (37 m)

Population (2020)
  - Total: 394
  - Density: 159.0/sq mi (61.38/km^{2})
- Time zone: UTC-6 (CST)
  - Summer (DST): UTC-5 (CDT)
- Area code: 337
- FIPS code: 22-76685
- GNIS feature ID: 2407563

Turkey Creek is a village in Evangeline Parish, Louisiana, United States. As of the 2020 census, Turkey Creek had a population of 394.

== Geography ==
Turkey Creek is located in northern Evangeline Parish. U.S. Route 167 passes through the village, leading southeast 17 miles (27 km) to Ville Platte, the parish seat, and north 10 miles (16 km) to Interstate 49. Louisiana Highway 13 intersects US 167 in the center of Turkey Creek and leads south 6 miles (10 km) to Pine Prairie.

According to the United States Census Bureau, Turkey Creek has a total area of 2.5 square miles (6.4 km^{2}), all land.

== Demographics ==
Historical population
Census	Pop.	Note	%±
1960	279		—
1970	280		0.4%
1980	366		30.7%
1990	283		−22.7%
2000	356		25.8%
2010	441		23.9%
2020	394		−10.7%
2025 (est.)	401	▲	1.8%
U.S. Decennial Census

As of the census of 2000, there were 356 people, 125 households, and 98 families residing in the village. The population density was 143.7 inhabitants per square mile (55.5/km^{2}). There were 148 housing units at an average density of 59.7 per square mile (23.1/km^{2}). The racial makeup of the village was 95.51% White, 1.40% African American, 1.40% Native American, 0.28% Asian, and 1.40% from two or more races. Hispanic or Latino of any race were 0.28% of the population.

There were 125 households, out of which 45.6% had children under the age of 18 living with them, 69.6% were married couples living together, 7.2% had a female householder with no husband present, and 20.8% were non-families. 18.4% of all households were made up of individuals, and 10.4% had someone living alone who was 65 years of age or older. The average household size was 2.85 and the average family size was 3.26.

In the village, the population was spread out, with 32.9% under the age of 18, 9.6% from 18 to 24, 25.8% from 25 to 44, 19.1% from 45 to 64, and 12.6% who were 65 years of age or older. The median age was 32 years. For every 100 females, there were 97.8 males. For every 100 females age 18 and over, there were 86.7 males.

The median income for a household in the village was $25,625, and the median income for a family was $31,250. Males had a median income of $30,000 versus $18,750 for females. The per capita income for the village was $10,845. About 10.3% of families and 14.1% of the population were below the poverty line, including 10.1% of those under age 18 and 25.0% of those age 65 or over.

== Education ==
Public schools in Evangeline Parish are operated by the Evangeline Parish School Board.
