= Mamou, Louisiana =

- Town
- Location of Mamou in Evangeline Parish, Louisiana.

- Location of Louisiana in the United States
- Coordinates: 30°37′45″N 92°25′04″W
- Country: United States
- State: Louisiana
- Parish: Evangeline
- Founder: C.C. Duson

Area
  - Total: 1.41 sq mi (3.65 km^{2})
  - Land: 1.41 sq mi (3.65 km^{2})
  - Water: 0 sq mi (0.00 km^{2})
- Elevation: 59 ft (18 m)

Population (2020)
  - Total: 2,936
  - Density: 2,083.3/sq mi (804.36/km^{2})
- Time zone: UTC-6 (CST)
  - Summer (DST): UTC-5 (CDT)
- ZIP code: 70554
- Area code: 337
- FIPS code: 22-48085
- GNIS feature ID: 2406085
- Website: mamou.municipalimpact.com

Mamou is a town in Evangeline Parish, Louisiana, United States. As of the 2020 census, Mamou had a population of 2,936.

== Geography ==
Mamou is located in south-central Evangeline Parish. Louisiana Highway 13 follows the western border of the town, leading north 3 miles (5 km) to Reddell and south 10 miles (16 km) to Eunice. Ville Platte, the parish seat, is 12 miles (19 km) to the northeast.

According to the United States Census Bureau, Mamou has a total area of 1.4 square miles (3.6 km^{2}), all land.

== History ==
Many stories exist regarding the origin of the name "Mamou". One may have been the legendary Indian, Chief Mamou. It is certain that this vast prairie was known as "Mamou Prairie" as far back as the 18th century and that Anglo-Americans first called it "Mammouth Prairie" because of its immense size. When the French came, they called it "Mamou" for mammoth. "Mamou" is also a family name found in France.

Within this vast stretch of prairie, the town site of Mamou was platted in 1907 by Curley C. Duson of Eunice. He was president of the Mamou Town Site Company which opened an office on the corner of Seventh and Chestnut. Lot auctions were held weekly and lots were sold for $50. The original village covered one square mile. On January 11, 1911, Mamou was incorporated.

Cotton was the major crop for many years on the prairie. By 1915, the village boasted four cotton gins producing thousands of bales of cotton; however, the decline in the demand for cotton led local farmers toward the growing of rice that is now the major crop of the area.

== Demographics ==
Historical population
Census	Pop.	Note	%±
1920	649		—
1930	800		23.3%
1940	1,379		72.4%
1950	2,254		63.5%
1960	2,928		29.9%
1970	3,275		11.9%
1980	3,194		−2.5%
1990	3,483		9.0%
2000	3,566		2.4%
2010	3,242		−9.1%
2020	2,936		−9.4%
2025 (est.)	2,830	▼	−3.6%
U.S. Decennial Census

Mamou racial composition as of 2020
Race	Number	Percentage
White (non-Hispanic)	1,396	47.55%
Black or African American (non-Hispanic)	1,323	45.06%
Native American	1	0.03%
Asian	15	0.51%
Other/Mixed	151	5.14%
Hispanic or Latino	50	1.7%

As of the 2020 United States census, there were 2,936 people, 1,128 households, and 615 families residing in the town.

== Education ==
Public schools in Evangeline Parish are operated by the Evangeline Parish School Board. Three campuses serve the town of Mamou – Mamou Elementary School (Grades PK–4), Mamou Junior High School (Grades 5–8), and Mamou High School (Grades 9–12). Mamou Upper Elementary and Mamou High School are located on the same campus.

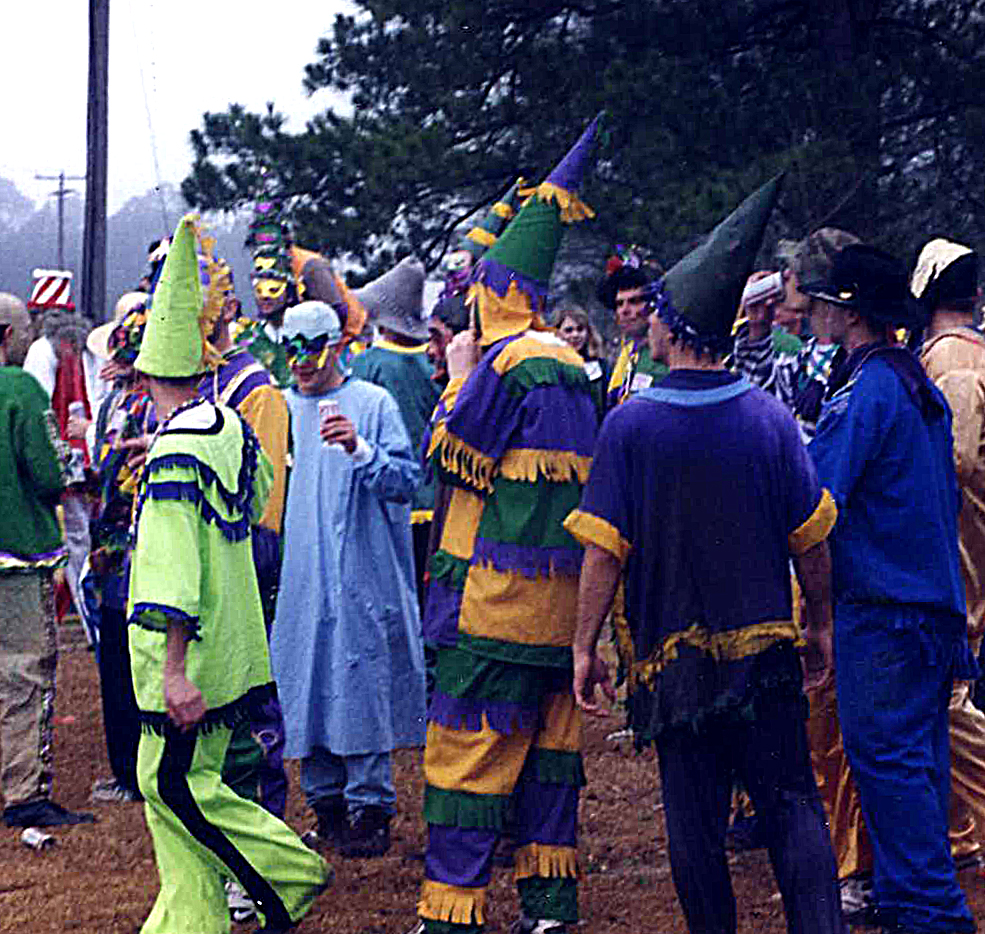
Courir de Mardi Gras in Mamou, 2006

== Culture ==
Mamou is located at the heart of Louisiana's Cajun country. The town is famous for its music and musicians, and bills itself as "The Cajun Music Capital of the World". Consequently, Mamou figures into a number of song titles (such as "'Tit Galop Pour Mamou," "Valse de Grand Mamou," "Mamou Two-Step," and "Mamou Hot Step") and lyrics such as "Somewhere Over China" by Jimmy Buffett, as well as band names (such as Steve Riley and the Mamou Playboys). Mamou is also home of the world-famous Fred's Lounge, which features live Cajun music every Saturday morning. Each year the town holds a Courir de Mardi Gras.

== Notable people ==
- Danny Ardoin, Major League Baseball player
- Jacqueline Ceballos, feminist and activist
- Lewis Elliott Chaze, journalist and author
- Austin Deculus, professional football player in the NFL
- Chris Duhon, professional basketball player
- Drastik, Hip-hop artist
- Malcolm Frank, former NFL and CFL defensive back
- Mayeus Lafleur, Cajun musician
- Barry Manuel, Major League Baseball, Louisiana State University All-American
- Jimmy C. Newman, singer
- Steve Riley, Cajun and zydeco accordionist, singer, and bandleader
- Keith Sonnier, visual artist
