= Clyde Vidrine =

Clyde C. Vidrine (1938 – December 16, 1986) was a bodyguard for four-term Louisiana Governor Edwin Edwards. He became famous for making accusations about the governor's elaborate Las Vegas trips and alleged infidelity to Edwards' wife Elaine Edwards. Vidrine, who had already been fired by Edwards, was murdered during Edwards' third term as governor.

Vidrine was shot and killed in broad daylight on the steps of the Joe D. Waggoner Building federal court house in downtown Shreveport on December 16, 1986. At the time Vidrine was serving as bodyguard for a woman who had recently separated from her husband, James Cummings. Cummings believed Vidrine and his wife were having an adulterous affair. Cummings stated that only he (James Cummings) was at the federal court house (not the parish court house) because of a bankruptcy hearing where he and his estranged wife were to appear. Cummings stated that Vidrine had threatened him in the past and had reached for a gun when Cummings shot him. A report, that he was waiting across the street in his car for his wife and Vidrine to arrive, contradicted James Cummings' version of what happened. When Clyde Vidrine and Kathy Cummings arrived, James Cummings opened fire three times with a 12-gauge shotgun, killing Clyde Vidrine but leaving Kathy Cummings untouched.
