= Evangeline Parish School Board =

School board of Evangeline Parish, Louisiana, U.S.

Coordinates: 30.6768°N 92.2814°W

The Evangeline Parish School Board (EPSB) or Evangeline Parish School District is an entity responsible for the operation of public schools in Evangeline Parish, Louisiana, United States. It is headquartered in the city of Ville Platte. The current Superintendent is Rev. Darwin Lazard, minister at Ninth Baptist Church in Ville Platte.

== Schools ==
- Grades 5-12
  - Basile High School (Basile)
  - Mamou High School (Mamou)
  - Ville Platte High School (Ville Platte)
- Grades PK-4 & 9-12
  - Pine Prairie High School (Pine Prairie)
- Grades PK-8
  - Bayou Chicot Elementary School (Unincorporated area north of Ville Platte)
  - Chataignier Elementary School (Chataignier)
  - Vidrine Elementary School (Unincorporated area west of Ville Platte)
- Grades PK-4
  - Mamou Elementary School (Mamou)
  - Ville Platte Elementary School (Ville Platte)
  - W.W. Stewart Elementary School (Basile)
- Grades PK-2
  - James Stephens Montessori School (Ville Platte)
- Other Campuses
  - Evangeline Central/Social Skills and Academic Center (Unincorporated area west of Ville Platte near Vidrine Elementary School)

== Demographics ==
- Total Students (as of October 1, 2007): 6,120
- Gender
  - Male: 52%
  - Female: 48%
- Race/Ethnicity
  - White: 57.75%
  - African American: 40.98%
  - Hispanic: 0.75%
  - Asian: 0.31%
  - Native American: 0.21%
- Socio-Economic Indicators
  - At-Risk: 76.39%
  - Free Lunch: 66.29%
  - Reduced Lunch: 10.10%

== See also ==
- List of school districts in Louisiana
