= Ronald G. Richard =

United States Marine Corps general

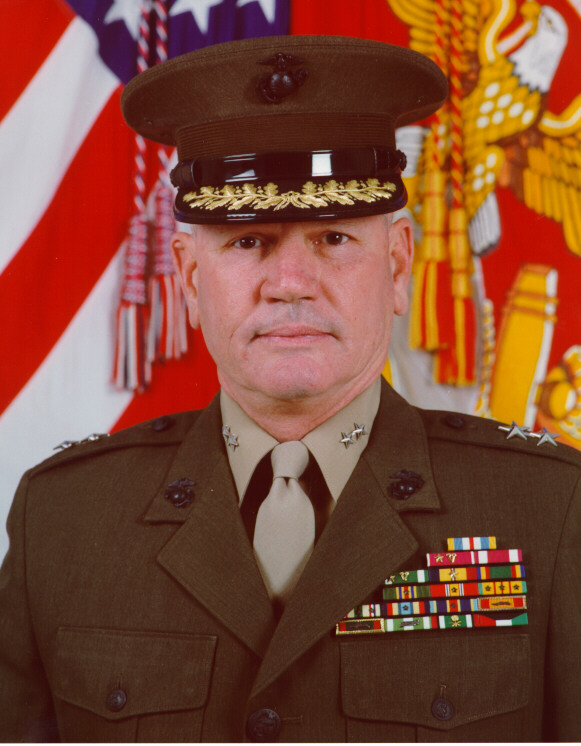
- Major General Ronald G. Richard
- Born: October 19, 1946 (age 79); Basile, Louisiana, U.S.
- Military career
- Allegiance: United States of America
- Branch: United States Marine Corps
- Service years: 1968–2001
- Rank: Major General
- Units: 3rd Battalion, 12th Marines; 4th Marine Division
- Commands: 10th Marines; Marine Corps Air Ground Combat Center Twentynine Palms; Marine Corps Base, Camp Lejeune
- Conflicts: Vietnam War; Persian Gulf War
- Awards: Distinguished Service Medal; Defense Superior Service Medal; Legion of Merit (2)
- Other work: CEO Tiger Athletic Foundation

Major General Ronald G. Richard (born October 19, 1946) is a retired United States Marine Corps officer who last served as the Commanding General of Marine Corps Base Camp Lejeune.

== Biography ==
Richard was born and raised in Basile, Louisiana. In 1968, he graduated from Louisiana State University (LSU) with a Bachelor's degree in History.

=== Marine Corps career ===
Richard completed his training at The Basic School in February 1969. He was transferred to the Republic of Vietnam and was assigned to Battery I, 3rd Battalion, 12th Marines as a forward observer for 3rd Battalion, 4th Marines. Returning to Okinawa with the 3rd Marine Division, he served as Aide-de-Camp to the Commanding General, 3rd Marine Division. In July 1970, he was reassigned to Quantico as a Staff Platoon Commander at The Basic School.

==== 1970s ====
From 1971 to 1975, he served with the 4th Marine Division in Louisiana and Texas.

Promoted to captain, he returned to Quantico as a Company Commander at the Staff Non-Commissioned Officer (SNCO) Academy in mid-1975. Captain Richard completed the Amphibious Warfare School at Quantico in June 1977, and subsequently attended the Senior Career Level Advance Course at Fort Sill, Oklahoma. In August 1977, he reported to the 3rd Battalion, 12th Marines as the Fire Support Coordinator for the 4th Marines, and then became the Commanding Officer of Battery H. During 1978, he posted to the Marine Security Guard Battalion, he served as the Executive Officer, Company F, Nairobi, Kenya. Following his promotion to major in 1979, he commanded Company F, Marine Security Guard Battalion, responsible for embassy security guards for sub-Saharan Africa.

Upon his return from overseas, Major Richard joined 4th Battalion, 11th Marines at Twentynine Palms, California, in August 1980. He initially served as Commanding Officer of 1st 155 Howitzer Battery, and then as the Battalion S-4. Transferred to the newly activated 27th Marines, he served as the Regimental Executive Officer until 1982 when he was accepted for Intermediate Level School (ILS).

==== 1980s ====
In 1983, he attended the Naval Command and Staff College, Newport, Rhode Island. While a student at the Naval Command and Staff College, he also earned a M.A. degree in International Relations from Salve Regina University.

Selected to lieutenant colonel, he then reported to the Command and Staff College as an instructor in Landing Force Operations in July 1983. Reassigned to Washington, DC, in 1986, he served as the POM working representative and as Head, Plans and Policy, Training Department, Headquarters Marine Corps.

Graduating from the Army War College, Carlisle, Pennsylvania, in 1988, Lieutenant Colonel Richard joined the 2nd Marine Division, Camp Lejeune, North Carolina, as the G-3 Operations Officer. On June 16, 1989, he was reassigned to the 10th Marine Regiment as Regimental Commander. He was promoted to colonel on August 1, 1990, and reassigned on August 16, as the Assistant Chief of Staff, G-3 and served in that billet throughout the Division's deployment to Southwest Asia during the Persian Gulf War.

==== 1990s ====
In July 1991, Colonel Richard joined Marine Corps Recruit Depot\Eastern Recruiting Region, Parris Island, South Carolina, as the Depot Assistant Chief of Staff, G-3. He was assigned duty as Commanding Officer of the Recruit Training Regiment in May 1992. While serving in this capacity, he was selected, for promotion to brigadier general and was advanced to that grade in May 1993.

In June 1993, he assumed his duties as the deputy director for Operations, National Military Command Center, J-3, Joint Staff, Organization of the JCS, Washington, DC. He subsequently served as the Assistant Deputy Chief of Staff for Manpower and Reserve Affairs, (Reserve Affairs), Headquarters Marine Corps, Washington, DC.

In June 1996, Brigadier General Richard was assigned as the Commanding General of Marine Corps Air Ground Combat Center, Twentynine Palms, CA, where he was promoted to his current rank in March 1997. From June 1998 to July 1999, he served as Deputy Commander, U.S. Marine Corps Forces Atlantic, Norfolk, VA.

Major General Richard's final assignment was Commanding General of Marine Corps Base, Camp Lejeune, NC from July 30, 1999, until his retirement.

=== Awards and decorations ===
Richard's personal decorations include:

1st Row		Navy Distinguished Service Medal	Defense Superior Service Medal	
2nd Row	Legion of Merit w/ 1 award star & valor device	Meritorious Service Medal	Navy and Marine Corps Commendation Medal w/ 1 award star & valor device	Combat Action Ribbon w/ 1 award star
3rd Row	Navy Unit Commendation	Navy Meritorious Unit Commendation w/ 1 service star	National Defense Service Medal w/ 1 service star	Vietnam Service Medal w/ 3 service stars
4th Row	Southwest Asia Service Medal w/ 3 service stars	Navy Sea Service Deployment Ribbon w/ 1 service star	Navy & Marine Corps Overseas Service Ribbon w/ 1 service star	Vietnam Gallantry Cross unit citation
5th Row	Vietnam Civil Actions unit citation	Vietnam Campaign Medal	Kuwait Liberation Medal (Saudi Arabia)	Kuwait Liberation Medal (Kuwait)

=== In retirement ===
In June 2001, after retirement from the Marine Corps, Major General Richard, an LSU alumnus, began a new career as the chief executive officer of the Tiger Athletic Foundation (TAF), a private, non-profit corporation dedicated to supporting LSU and all of its athletic programs. In his role as CEO of the Tiger Athletic Foundation, Major General Richard's responsibilities include fostering lines of communication with LSU's athletic and academic administration and developing support projects for all LSU athletic programs. In addition to maintaining TAF's community relations, he also oversees the day-to-day operations of the organization including staff development and fund raising activities.

== See also ==
United States Marine Corps
Tiger Athletic Foundation
