= Basile, Louisiana =

- Town
- Town of Basile
- Location of Basile in Evangeline and Acadia Parishes, Louisiana.

- Location of Louisiana in the United States

- Location in Louisiana Basile (the United States) Basile (North America)
- Coordinates: 30°29′08″N 92°36′04″W
- Country: United States
- State: Louisiana
- Parishes: Acadia and Evangeline

Area
  - Total: 1.16 sq mi (3.00 km^{2})
  - Land: 1.16 sq mi (3.00 km^{2})
  - Water: 0 sq mi (0.00 km^{2})
- Elevation: 46 ft (14 m)

Population (2020)
  - Total: 1,214
  - Density: 1,050/sq mi (404/km^{2})
- Time zone: UTC-6 (CST)
  - Summer (DST): UTC-5 (CDT)
- ZIP code: 70515
- Area code: 337
- FIPS code: 22-04580
- GNIS feature ID: 2405211

Basile is a town in Acadia and Evangeline parishes in the U.S. state of Louisiana. The population was 1,214 in 2020.

The Acadia Parish portion of Basile is part of the Crowley Micropolitan Statistical Area.

== Geography ==
Most of the city limits are located in Evangeline Parish with a small southern portion of the town being in Acadia Parish.

U.S. Highway 190 passes through the town with the towns of Elton (7 miles) and Kinder (16 miles) both being located to the west of the town, and Eunice located 11 miles (18 km) east. The city of Jennings, parish seat of Jefferson Davis Parish, is located 23 miles (37 km) south via LA-97. It intersects with U.S. 190 east of the town.

According to the United States Census Bureau, the town has a total area of 1.2 square miles (3.0 km^{2}), all land.

== Demographics ==
Historical population
Census	Pop.	Note	%±
1920	552		—
1930	403		−27.0%
1940	1,132		180.9%
1950	1,572		38.9%
1960	1,932		22.9%
1970	1,779		−7.9%
1980	2,635		48.1%
1990	1,808		−31.4%
2000	1,660		−8.2%
2010	1,821		9.7%
2020	1,214		−33.3%
2025 (est.)	1,192	▼	−1.8%
U.S. Decennial Census

Basile racial composition as of 2020
Race	Number	Percentage
White (non-Hispanic)	839	69.11%
Black or African American (non-Hispanic)	234	19.28%
Native American	6	0.49%
Asian	15	1.24%
Other/Mixed	63	5.19%
Hispanic or Latino	57	4.7%

As of the 2020 United States census, there were 1,214 people, 570 households, and 345 families residing in the town. As of the census of 2000, there were 1,660 people, 629 households, and 417 families residing in the town. The population density was 1,455.5 inhabitants per square mile (562.0/km^{2}). There were 696 housing units at an average density of 610.3 units per square mile (235.6 units/km^{2}). The racial makeup of the town was 81.08% White, 17.83% Black or African American, 0.12% Native American, 0.36% Asian, 0.06% from other races, and 0.54% from two or more races. Hispanic or Latino of any race were 1.39% of the population.

There were 629 households, out of which 34.7% had children under the age of 18 living with them, 47.1% were married couples living together, 14.3% had a female householder with no husband present, and 33.7% were non-families. 30.7% of all households were made up of individuals, and 13.0% had someone living alone who was 65 years of age or older. The average household size was 2.52 and the average family size was 3.20.

In the town, the population was spread out, with 29.2% under the age of 18, 9.2% from 18 to 24, 25.8% from 25 to 44, 18.7% from 45 to 64, and 17.2% who were 65 years of age or older. The median age was 35 years. For every 100 females, there were 83.0 males. For every 100 females age 18 and over, there were 79.3 males.

The median income for a household in the town was $18,922, and the median income for a family was $23,008. Males had a median income of $21,389 versus $13,603 for females. The per capita income for the town was $10,568. About 30.3% of families and 31.9% of the population were below the poverty line, including 37.7% of those under the age of 18 and 21.5% of those 65 and older.

== Government ==
Basile is also the location of the privately operated South Louisiana ICE Processing Center, which has been exclusively used as an ICE Processing Center since April 2019.

== Education ==
Public schools in Evangeline Parish are operated by the Evangeline Parish School Board. Two campuses serve the town of Basile - W.W. Stewart Elementary School (Grades PK-4) and Basile High School (Grades 5–12). The Basile High School mascot is the "Bearcat".

Basile was formerly home to a Methodist-run school for girls, the Evangeline Industrial Home, founded in 1922.

== Notable people ==
- Nathan Abshire, Cajun musician and singer
- Dewey Balfa, Cajun fiddler, singer
- Harry Choates, Cajun fiddler
- J. Douglas Deshotel, Roman Catholic bishop
- Tommy McClelland, athletic director at Rice University
- Ronald G. Richard, retired Marine Corps major general and former commandant of Camp Lejeune
