= National Register of Historic Places listings in Avoyelles Parish, Louisiana =

Location of Avoyelles Parish in Louisiana

Avoyelles Parish, Louisiana, United States, has 30 properties and districts listed on the National Register of Historic Places, including one National Historic Landmark. Another two properties were once listed but have been removed.

The locations of National Register properties and districts for which the latitude and longitude coordinates are included below, may be seen in a map.

This National Park Service list is complete through NPS recent listings posted June 6, 2026.

== Current listings ==
	Name on the Register	Image	Date listed	Location	City or town	Description
1	Bailey Hotel	Bailey Hotel	August 5, 1999 (#99000929)	200 West Magnolia Street; 30°57′13″N 92°11′06″W	Bunkie	
2	Bailey Theatre	Bailey Theatre	July 26, 1979 (#79001052)	North side of West Oak Street, between Walnut Street and Northwest Main Street; 30°57′17″N 92°11′06″W	Bunkie	Building demolished or destroyed sometime after its listing.
3	Bayou Rouge Baptist Church	Bayou Rouge Baptist Church	December 3, 1980 (#80001696)	Corner of Church Street and Barron Lane; 30°57′19″N 92°06′11″W	Evergreen	Greek Revival-style church built in 1859.
4	Alfred H. Bordelon House	Alfred H. Bordelon House	November 6, 1986 (#86003133)	511 North Washington Street; 31°07′45″N 92°03′48″W	Marksville	Greek Revival house from 1872, also known as E.M. Michel House and Belle Oak
5	Hypolite Bordelon House	Hypolite Bordelon House	October 16, 1980 (#80001698)	242 Tunica Drive West; 31°07′33″N 92°04′22″W	Marksville	
6	Bordelonville Floodgate	Bordelonville Floodgate	March 14, 1991 (#91000277)	Siding Floodgate Crossing, north of Louisiana Highway 451, about 2.6 miles (4.2 km) east of Bordelonville; 31°06′01″N 91°51′51″W	Bordelonville	
7	Calliham Plantation House	Calliham Plantation House	July 22, 1982 (#82002754)	Old Louisiana Highway 1, shortly west of Noling Crossing; 31°01′30″N 91°55′45″W	Hamburg	
8	Central Bank and Trust Co.	Central Bank and Trust Co.	May 8, 1998 (#98000439)	2472 Main Street; 31°03′32″N 92°07′18″W	Hessmer	Also known as the Old Post Office. Building currently host a law office.
9	Central Bank and Trust Company, Mansura	Central Bank and Trust Company, Mansura	September 1, 2005 (#05000933)	2057 L'Eglise Street; 31°03′30″N 92°02′56″W	Mansura	Currently known as the Mansura Senior Citizens Center
10	Dr. Jules Charles Des Fosse House	Dr. Jules Charles Des Fosse House	April 23, 1976 (#76000961)	On High School, about 90 yards (82 m) west of L'Eglise Street; 31°03′44″N 92°03′06″W	Mansura	
11	Fort DeRussy	Fort DeRussy	September 23, 2016 (#16000669)	379 Fort DeRussy Road, about 3.3 miles (5.3 km) north of Marksville; 31°10′35″N 92°03′39″W	Marksville	
12	Fort No. 2 at Yellow Bayou	Fort No. 2 at Yellow Bayou	April 17, 1997 (#97000337)	Along western bank of Yellow Bayou, intersection of Louisiana Highway 1 and Louisiana Highway 1183; 30°59′23″N 91°50′33″W	Simmesport	Also known as Fort Humbug and Fort Scurry
13	Frithland	Frithland	May 9, 1985 (#85000969)	On Louisiana Highway 29, about 1.1 miles (1.8 km) south of Bunkie; 30°56′19″N 92°11′27″W	Bunkie	
14	Joffrion House	Joffrion House	August 11, 1982 (#82002755)	605 North Monroe Street; 31°07′52″N 92°03′53″W	Marksville	
15	Thomas A. Lemoine House	Thomas A. Lemoine House	July 18, 1985 (#85001589)	Along Louisiana Highway 451; 31°01′55″N 91°55′58″W	Hamburg	Italianate cottage built in 1885 by builder Thomas A. Lemoine. Originally located in Moreauville, it was moved to Hamburg in 1978.
16	Thomas A. Lemoine House	Thomas A. Lemoine House	July 18, 1985 (#85001588)	Along Louisiana Highway 451; 31°02′23″N 91°58′37″W	Moreauville	High fashion house built in 1916 by builder Thomas A. Lemoine. Designed by Favrot & Livaudais.
17	Lone Pine	Lone Pine	October 28, 1982 (#82000430)	About 430 yards (390 m) west of Louisiana Highway 361, 0.5 miles (0.80 km) southeast of Evergreen; 30°56′42″N 92°06′11″W	Evergreen	
18	Louisiana Railway and Navigation Company Depot	Louisiana Railway and Navigation Company Depot	November 1, 1996 (#96001264)	Corner of Depot Street and Cleco Street; 31°03′24″N 92°03′03″W	Mansura	
19	Marksville Commercial Historic District	Marksville Commercial Historic District	March 16, 1983 (#83000489)	Roughly bounded by Monroe Street, Washington Street, Ogden Street, and Bontempt Street; 31°07′37″N 92°03′59″W	Marksville	The 20 acres (8.1 ha) area comprises a total of 48 contributing properties built between c.1850 and 1933
20	Marksville Prehistoric Indian Site	Marksville Prehistoric Indian Site	October 15, 1966 (#66000372)	Marksville Prehistoric Indian Park State Monument; 31°07′29″N 92°02′52″W	Marksville	
21	Moreauville High School	Moreauville High School	February 14, 2008 (#08000019)	287 Main Street; 31°02′08″N 91°58′23″W	Moreauville	Currently Avoyelles High School
22	Oak Hall	Oak Hall	November 6, 1986 (#86003134)	Along Louisiana Highway 29, about 4.5 miles (7.2 km) south of Bunkie; 30°53′31″N 92°12′42″W	Bunkie	
23	Oakwold Plantation House	Oakwold Plantation House	July 23, 1980 (#80001697)	End of Oakwood Lane, shortly west of Evergreen off Louisiana Highway 29; 30°57′07″N 92°06′51″W	Evergreen	
24	Adam Ponthieu Store-Big Bend Post Office	Adam Ponthieu Store-Big Bend Post Office	January 24, 2002 (#01001490)	8554 Louisiana Highway 451; 31°04′25″N 91°47′37″W	Big Bend	Now hosting the Big Bend Museum
25	Dr. Thomas A. Roy Sr. House	Dr. Thomas A. Roy Sr. House	May 9, 1985 (#85000971)	2032 L'Eglise Street; 31°03′31″N 92°02′59″W	Mansura	Contributing 1901 Doctor's Office seems to be no more in existence.
26	St. Anthony of Padua Catholic Church		July 6, 2021 (#100006721)	209 South Holly St. 30°57′10″N 92°11′15″W	Bunkie	
27	St. Mary's Assumption Church	St. Mary's Assumption Church	May 1, 1989 (#89000330)	Front Street, between St. Mary Street and Cottonport Avenue; 30°59′13″N 92°03′20″W	Cottonport	
28	St. Paul Lutheran Church	St. Paul Lutheran Church	March 1, 1990 (#90000353)	Along Louisiana Highway 107, about 2.1 miles (3.4 km) north of Mansura; 31°05′21″N 92°02′54″W	Mansura	
29	Sarto Bridge	Sarto Bridge	November 21, 1989 (#89002027)	Off Louisiana Highway 451, crossing over Bayou Des Glaises; 31°04′26″N 91°47′33″W	Big Bend	
30	Texas and Pacific Railroad Depot	Texas and Pacific Railroad Depot	March 22, 1991 (#91000345)	North corner of West Main Street and East Oak Street; 30°57′19″N 92°11′04″W	Bunkie	

== Former listings ==
	Name on the Register	Image	Date listed	Date removed	Location	City or town	Description
1	Clarendon Plantation House	Clarendon Plantation House	May 9, 1985 (#85000970)	July 22, 2016	On Louisiana Highway 29, about 1.3 miles (2.1 km) west of Evergreen; 30°57′05″N 92°07′53″W	Evergreen	House was demolished in May 1991.
2	Edwin Epps House	Edwin Epps House	April 12, 1984 (#84001255)	June 12, 2017	U.S. Route 71; 30°57′41″N 92°11′38″W	Bunkie	House was moved and restored in 1999. Now it's located on the grounds of LSU-Alexandria Campus.
3	Lacour's Fish and Ice Company Building	Lacour's Fish and Ice Company Building	September 8, 1983 (#83000488)	March 31, 2015	403 Main Street; 30°59′16″N 91°48′36″W	Simmesport	Building no more existing. A plaque reading "Louisiana Ice & Utilities Bunkie Div.", visible in StreetView, is still standing on a fence along Main Street.

== See also ==
- List of National Historic Landmarks in Louisiana
- National Register of Historic Places listings in Louisiana
