= List of United States tornadoes from September to December 2023 =

List of tornadoes in the United States

United States tornadoes from September to December 2023
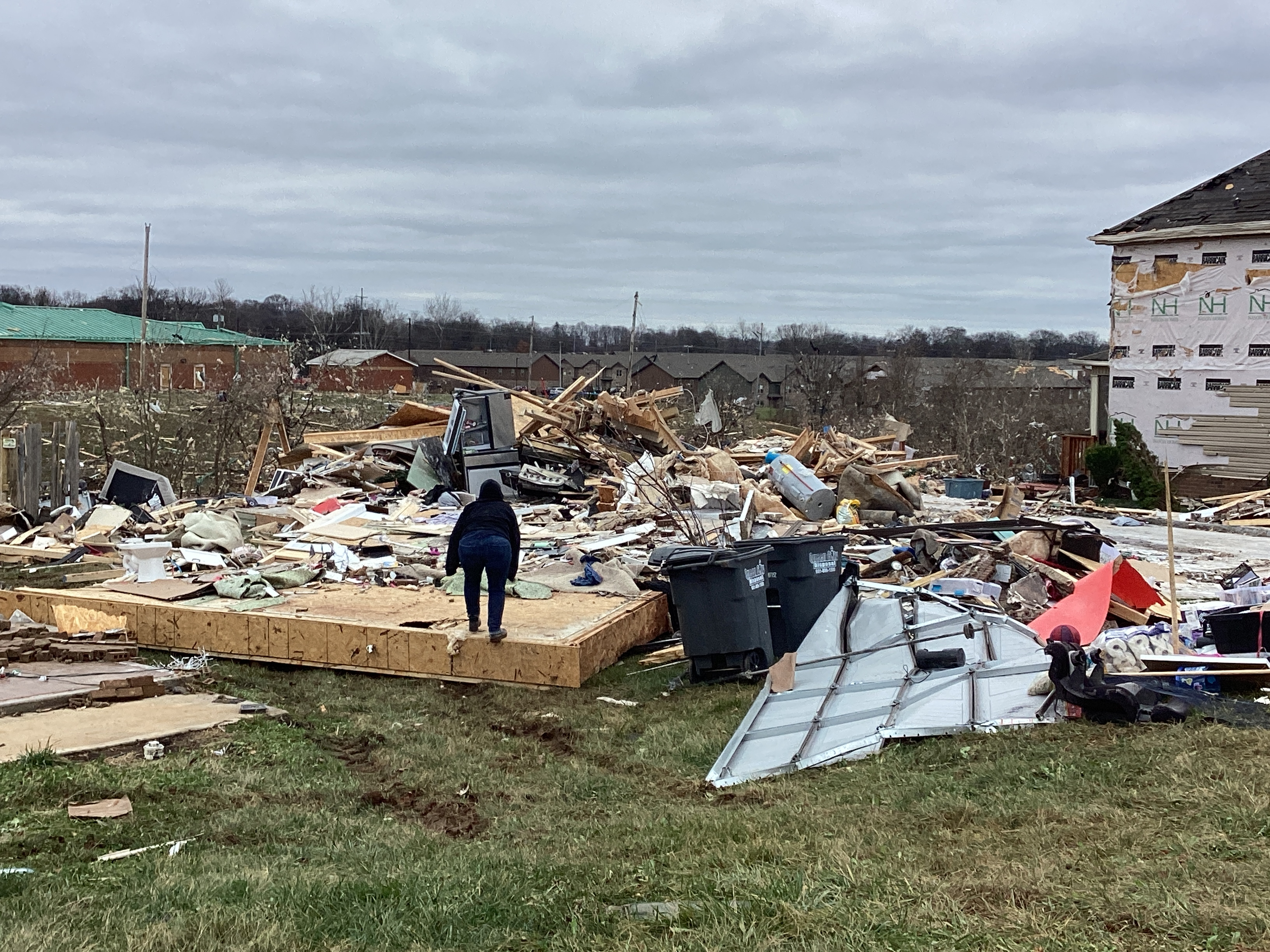
- EF3 damage in Clarksville, Tennessee following a deadly tornado on December 9
- Timespan: September 2 – December 19
- Maximum rated tornado: EF3 tornado: Clarksville, Tennessee on December 9
- Tornadoes: 106
- Fatalities: 7
- Injuries: 94

This page documents all tornadoes confirmed by various weather forecast offices of the National Weather Service in the United States in September, October, November and December 2023. Tornado counts are considered preliminary until final publication in the database of the National Centers for Environmental Information. On average, there are 66 confirmed tornadoes in the United States in September, 59 in October, 54 in November and 28 in December.

In September, tornadoes are most likely to occur in relation to the Atlantic hurricane season (as September is the peak month of hurricane season), and they can occur almost anywhere in the southern and eastern states as a result of landfalling tropical cyclones should such occur. A secondary focal point lies in the Midwest and Great Lakes as a result of early-autumn frontal systems. While tropical activity tends to decrease in October, the relative peak shifts into the Great Plains and towards the southern states as the jet stream shifts southward (albeit generally with less activity than in the spring months in the same regions). In November and December, these tornadoes are most likely in the southern states due to their proximity to the unstable airmass and warm waters of the Gulf of Mexico, with occasional incursions farther north into the Midwest especially in November.

The fall months were very quiet in terms of tornadoes in the United States. With relatively quiet tropical activity in the United States in September and few early-season frontal systems, tornadic activity in September was very limited, with only isolated, weak tornado touchdowns. Only 30 tornadoes were confirmed (all of them weak), which was well below average. October also saw well below normal activity with a total of 35 tornadoes, however, more significant tornadoes occurred compared to the previous month as a result of a damaging outbreak in Florida during the middle of the month. November was also well below average with 19 tornadoes, all of them weak. December was slightly below average with 21 tornadoes, with most of the activity focused on a single, albeit destructive outbreak of 18 tornadoes early in the month.

== September ==
Confirmed tornadoes by Enhanced Fujita rating
EFU	EF0	EF1	EF2	EF3	EF4	EF5	Total
15	12	3	0	0	0	0	30

=== September 2 event ===
List of confirmed tornadoes - Saturday, September 2, 2023 (Note: All dates are based on the local time zone where the tornado touched down; however, all times are in Coordinated Universal Time for consistency.)
EF#	Location	County / Parish	State	Start Coord.	Time (UTC)	Path length	Max width
EF0	Southern Kenner	Jefferson	LA	29.98°N 90.25°W	16:11–16:13	0.69 mi (1.11 km)	75 yd (69 m)
EF0	A brief, weak tornado occurred on the south side of Kenner, where several buildings had minor damage. Tin roofing was peeled off of a theater, Kenner Fire Station 36 sustained minimal damage, and a police van had its windows blown out. An electrical line was downed as well.						

=== September 9 event ===
List of confirmed tornadoes - Saturday, September 9, 2023
EF#	Location	County / Parish	State	Start Coord.	Time (UTC)	Path length	Max width
EF0	Chino Valley	Yavapai	AZ	34.74°N 112.45°W	21:30–21:32	0.1 mi (0.16 km)	10 yd (9.1 m)
EF0	A landspout tornado was reported. No damage occurred.						
EFU	SW of Haigler	Cheyenne	KS	39.92°N 101.99°W	22:25	unknown	unknown
EFU	A landspout tornado was reported via social media. No damage occurred.						

=== September 10 event ===
List of confirmed tornadoes - Sunday, September 10, 2023
EF#	Location	County / Parish	State	Start Coord.	Time (UTC)	Path length	Max width
EFU	NW of Clarkston	Cache	UT	41.95°N 112.07°W	22:30	Unknown	Unknown
EFU	A landspout was recorded doing no damage.						

=== September 11 event ===
List of confirmed tornadoes - Monday, September 11, 2023
EF#	Location	County / Parish	State	Start Coord.	Time (UTC)	Path length	Max width
EF0	NE of Dagsboro	Sussex	DE	38.5741°N 75.2194°W	18:55–18:57	0.7 mi (1.1 km)	370 yd (340 m)
EF0	A brief high-end EF0 tornado inflicted window, siding, and shingle damage to three homes. Two garden sheds were damaged, multiple trees were uprooted, and tree branches were snapped as well.						
EF0	NW of Elkton	St. Johns	FL	29.85°N 81.5°W	22:10	0.01 mi (0.016 km)	5 yd (4.6 m)
EF0	A landspout tornado damaged a horse stable and knocked over port-a-potty.						

=== September 13 event ===
List of confirmed tornadoes - Wednesday, September 13, 2023
EF#	Location	County / Parish	State	Start Coord.	Time (UTC)	Path length	Max width
EF1	ESE of Killingly, CT to NW of Foster, RI	Windham (CT), Providence (RI)	CT, RI	41.8109°N 71.8178°W	20:00–20:10	1.61 mi (2.59 km)	70 yd (64 m)
EF1	Shingles were removed from a two-story home and trees were snapped or uprooted. This was the first of four tornadoes produced by this supercell.						
EF1	S of Glocester	Providence	RI	41.8586°N 71.6736°W	20:20–20:28	0.21 mi (0.34 km)	150 yd (140 m)
EF1	A bus stop shelter was blown away and its remnants were thrown, with some of the debris landing on top of a home. Over 75 trees were snapped or uprooted as well. This was the second of four tornadoes produced by this supercell.						
EFU	NNW of Roosevelt	Duchesne	UT	40.33°N 110.01°W	20:30	Unknown	Unknown
EFU	A landspout was photographed doing no damage.						
EF1	WNW of Lincoln	Providence	RI	41.9256°N 71.4798°W	21:05–21:09	0.21 mi (0.34 km)	60 yd (55 m)
EF1	Two sections of solar panels in a field were uplifted, a building suffered damage to part of its roof, a large tree was uprooted, and a large branch was twisted off of another tree. This was the third of four tornadoes produced by this supercell.						
EF0	W of North Attleborough	Bristol	MA	41.9793°N 71.3579°W	21:22–21:25	0.07 mi (0.11 km)	70 yd (64 m)
EF0	The tops of three trees were twisted off and lofted into a nearby pasture. This was the last of four tornadoes produced by this supercell.						

=== September 16 event ===
List of confirmed tornadoes - Saturday, September 16, 2023
EF#	Location	County / Parish	State	Start Coord.	Time (UTC)	Path length	Max width
EFU	E of La Villa	Hidalgo	TX	26.2937°N 97.9141°W	20:14–20:15	0.04 mi (0.064 km)	10 yd (9.1 m)
EFU	A landspout tornado that caused no damage was caught on video.						

=== September 19 event ===
List of confirmed tornadoes - Tuesday, September 19, 2023
EF#	Location	County / Parish	State	Start Coord.	Time (UTC)	Path length	Max width
EF0	ESE of Nekoma to W of Rush Center	Rush	KS	38.4589°N 99.3959°W	23:52–23:58	1.67 mi (2.69 km)	25 yd (23 m)
EF0	A highly-visible landspout tornado was photographed and caught on video. A center irrigation pivot was flipped.						

=== September 21 event ===
List of confirmed tornadoes - Thursday, September 21, 2023
EF#	Location	County / Parish	State	Start Coord.	Time (UTC)	Path length	Max width
EFU	NE of Norcatur to NW of Norton	Norton	KS	39.9179°N 100.0596°W	01:36–01:53	4.58 mi (7.37 km)	200 yd (180 m)
EFU	A tornado was photographed as it moved through open fields, causing no damage.						

=== September 22 event ===
List of confirmed tornadoes - Friday, September 22, 2023
EF#	Location	County / Parish	State	Start Coord.	Time (UTC)	Path length	Max width
EFU	NNE of Blairstown	Benton	IA	41.9494°N 92.0701°W	22:42–22:43	0.31 mi (0.50 km)	20 yd (18 m)
EFU	Multiple trained storm spotters reported a brief tornado. No damage occurred.						

=== September 23 event ===
List of confirmed tornadoes - Saturday, September 23, 2023
EF#	Location	County / Parish	State	Start Coord.	Time (UTC)	Path length	Max width
EF0	N of Belvidere	Perquimans	NC	36.33°N 76.53°W	11:37–11:38	0.48 mi (0.77 km)	50 yd (46 m)
EF0	A brief tornado was captured on video over a field. No damage occurred.						
EFU	ESE of Bruce	Brookings	SD	44.417°N 96.843°W	20:54–20:59	0.74 mi (1.19 km)	20 yd (18 m)
EFU	Multiple storm chasers reported swirling debris below a funnel cloud as it moved through an open field. No damage was found.						
EFU	N of Leota	Nobles	MN	43.842°N 96.015°W	20:56	0.01 mi (0.016 km)	10 yd (9.1 m)
EFU	A spin-up tornado in a field was observed by a storm chaser. No damage occurred.						
EFU	ENE of Bruce	Brookings	SD	44.451°N 96.814°W	21:04–21:08	0.78 mi (1.26 km)	20 yd (18 m)
EFU	Multiple storm chasers observed a tornado in an open field. No damage occurred.						
EFU	NE of Madison	Lac qui Parle	MN	45.08°N 96.11°W	21:14–21:15	0.25 mi (0.40 km)	25 yd (23 m)
EFU	A brief, rain-wrapped tornado was spotted in an open field. No damage occurred.						
EFU	NE of Bruce	Brookings	SD	44.492°N 96.799°W	21:16	0.01 mi (0.016 km)	10 yd (9.1 m)
EFU	A storm chaser witnessed a very brief tornado. No damage occurred.						
EF0	NE of Estelline	Deuel	SD	44.66°N 96.83°W	21:20	0.01 mi (0.016 km)	10 yd (9.1 m)
EF0	A brief tornado touchdown was reported. No damage occurred.						
EFU	SSE of Toronto	Brookings	SD	44.527°N 96.626°W	21:50	0.01 mi (0.016 km)	10 yd (9.1 m)
EFU	A brief tornado was witnessed by a storm chaser. No damage occurred.						

=== September 25 event ===
List of confirmed tornadoes - Monday, September 25, 2023
EF#	Location	County / Parish	State	Start Coord.	Time (UTC)	Path length	Max width
EFU	E of New Glarus	Green	WI	42.8112°N 89.5603°W	23:10–23:11	0.04 mi (0.064 km)	25 yd (23 m)
EFU	A tornado was filmed by a storm chaser. Some crop damage occurred in a dried-up corn field.						
EF0	Northern Edna	Jackson	TX	29.00°N 96.65°W	01:01–01:02	0.3 mi (0.48 km)	20 yd (18 m)
EF0	A brief high-end EF0 tornado inflicted roof damage and shattered windows at an apartment complex on the north side of Edna. Some metal storage units were also damaged.						

=== September 26 event ===
List of confirmed tornadoes - Tuesday, September 26, 2023
EF#	Location	County / Parish	State	Start Coord.	Time (UTC)	Path length	Max width
EFU	NW of Garrison	Benton	IA	42.18°N 92.2°W	20:15–20:16	0.1 mi (0.16 km)	20 yd (18 m)
EFU	Emergency management witnessed a brief tornado lofting corn leaves off of the ground. No damage occurred.						
EF0	E of Asbury Lake	Clay	FL	30.043°N 81.7768°W	20:40–20:44	0.36 mi (0.58 km)	10 yd (9.1 m)
EF0	A landspout tornado was seen lifting light debris and dust. No damage occurred.						
EF0	Eastern Green Cove Springs	Clay	FL	29.99°N 81.66°W	21:05	0.01 mi (0.016 km)	5 yd (4.6 m)
EF0	A landspout tornado was reported near the outskirts of Green Cove Springs. No damage occurred.						

=== September 28 event ===
List of confirmed tornadoes - Thursday, September 28, 2023
EF#	Location	County / Parish	State	Start Coord.	Time (UTC)	Path length	Max width
EF0	SE of Amity	Madison	OH	40.0632°N 82.243°W	19:40–19:41	0.01 mi (0.016 km)	25 yd (23 m)
EF0	A landspout tornado caused minor damage to an outbuilding and playground equipment.						

=== September 29 event ===
List of confirmed tornadoes - Friday, September 28, 2023
EF#	Location	County / Parish	State	Start Coord.	Time (UTC)	Path length	Max width
EF0	WNW of Rockford	Wright	MN	45.11°N 93.83°W	01:48–01:49	0.69 mi (1.11 km)	25 yd (23 m)
EF0	A weak tornado embedded in a line of storms damaged or uprooted about 100 trees, a few which fell on structures.						

== October ==
Confirmed tornadoes by Enhanced Fujita rating
EFU	EF0	EF1	EF2	EF3	EF4	EF5	Total
8	21	4	3	0	0	0	36

=== October 1 event ===
List of confirmed tornadoes - Sunday, October 1, 2023
EF#	Location	County / Parish	State	Start Coord.	Time (UTC)	Path length	Max width
EF0	SE of Manuelitas	San Miguel	NM	35.79°N 105.27°W	00:12–00:18	1.32 mi (2.12 km)	50 yd (46 m)
EF0	The roof a house was damaged and a chicken coop was tossed.						

=== October 3 event ===
List of confirmed tornadoes - Monday, October 3, 2023
EF#	Location	County / Parish	State	Start Coord.	Time (UTC)	Path length	Max width
EFU	NW of Goodland	Sherman	KS	39.41°N 101.86°W	19:17	unknown	unknown
EFU	A landspout was captured on camera.						
EF0	NE of Overton	Dawson	NE	40.7549°N 99.496°W	20:59–21:01	1.08 mi (1.74 km)	50 yd (46 m)
EF0	A brief tornado caused damage to a few irrigation pivots and minor tree damage.						
EF1	NNW of Norton	Norton	KS	39.9875°N 99.9263°W	21:25–21:26	0.08 mi (0.13 km)	30 yd (27 m)
EF1	A brief EF1 tornado touched down, damaging a few farm outbuildings.						
EF0	E of Hazard	Sherman	NE	41.0911°N 98.9952°W	21:46–21:47	0.59 mi (0.95 km)	25 yd (23 m)
EF0	A farmstead sustained minor damage, while a large tree was heavily damaged to the east. Some additional tree damage occurred before lifting.						
EF0	Southern Rockville	Sherman	NE	41.1196°N 98.8308°W	21:56	0.01 mi (0.016 km)	25 yd (23 m)
EF0	A brief tornado occurred causing minor damage.						
EF1	S of Pilger	Stanton	NE	41.91°N 97.05°W	00:39–00:41	0.86 mi (1.38 km)	100 yd (91 m)
EF1	A brief EF1 tornado touched down, damaging a farm outbuilding and causing light crop damage.						

=== October 4 event ===
List of confirmed tornadoes - Monday, October 3, 2023
EF#	Location	County / Parish	State	Start Coord.	Time (UTC)	Path length	Max width
EFU	S of Whiteface	Cochran	TX	33.584°N 102.615°W	21:35	Unknown	Unknown
EFU	A brief landspout caused no damage.						

=== October 11 event ===
List of confirmed tornadoes - Wednesday, October 11, 2023
EF#	Location	County / Parish	State	Start Coord.	Time (UTC)	Path length	Max width
EF0	La Center	Clark	WA	45.8755°N 122.6892°W	22:40–22:41	0.5 mi (0.80 km)	100 yd (91 m)
EF0	A brief tornado was filmed. Trash cans and a basketball hoop were blown over along with a few shingles being ripped off of roofs.						
EF0	Eastern Sarasota	Sarasota	FL	27.2661°N 82.3829°W	02:59–03:00	0.18 mi (0.29 km)	50 yd (46 m)
EF0	A very brief high-end EF0 tornado collapsed a pool cage at one home and moved a trailer several feet at another home. Trees were damaged as well.						
EF0	Oldsmar	Pinellas	FL	28.0319°N 82.6725°W	04:13–04:15	0.26 mi (0.42 km)	50 yd (46 m)
EF0	A high-end EF0 tornadic waterspout that developed over Safety Harbor moved onshore into Oldsmar. A two-story home had a large portion of its roof removed with other homes suffering minor to moderate damage. Large trees were damaged as well.						

=== October 12 event ===
List of confirmed tornadoes - Thursday, October 12, 2023
EF#	Location	County / Parish	State	Start Coord.	Time (UTC)	Path length	Max width
EF2	Northern Clearwater Beach to Northern Dunedin	Pinellas	FL	28.003°N 82.8285°W	05:47–05:55	4.97 mi (8.00 km)	300 yd (270 m)
EF2	A tornadic waterspout moved ashore, causing significant damage to multiple homes, vehicles, a yacht club, and snapped or uprooted sea grape and palm trees. Continuing northeastward, the tornado crossed St. Joseph Sound and upon reaching the opposite shore, exhibited its peak strength of low-end EF2, ripping part of the roof off a three-story condo and knocking down part of the wall it was attached to. The tornado then damaged a strip mall and some mobile homes before dissipating.						
EF2	Crystal River Preserve State Park to NE of Crystal River	Citrus	FL	28.8464°N 82.6108°W	06:08–06:19	5.6 mi (9.0 km)	300 yd (270 m)
EF2	This strong tornado, which likely began as a tornadic waterspout, was first observed within the northeast corner of Crystal River Preserve State Park. Moving northeastward, the tornado quickly strengthened to EF2 strength as it tracked close to the Paradise Point community, where several large trees and tree branches were snapped and homes suffered partial to complete loss of their roofs. The tornado then crossed US 19 into the southeastern part of Crystal River and struck another home, ripping off a large portion of its roof and knocking down multiple exterior walls. Other homes in the area suffered varying degrees of roof damage and trees and power poles were snapped or uprooted. The tornado weakened as it continued northeastward and passed east of Crystal River, causing more damage to roofs, trees, and power poles before dissipating after exiting town.						
EF0	Eastern Trinity	Pasco	FL	28.1865°N 82.6175°W	06:17–06:18	0.11 mi (0.18 km)	15 yd (14 m)
EF0	A very brief tornado, which was captured on a doorbell camera, threw lawn furniture and bent fences.						
EF2	Palm Coast	Flagler	FL	29.5678°N 81.2512°W	08:40–08:46	1 mi (1.6 km)	200 yd (180 m)
EF2	A low-end EF2 flipped a car and caused significant roof damage to several homes. Trees and powerlines were downed and lanai enclosures, sheds, and fences were significantly damaged or destroyed.						
EF0	W of Bunnell to southern Palm Coast to Painters Hill	Flagler	FL	29.4674°N 81.3391°W	12:30–12:53	12.07 mi (19.42 km)	25 yd (23 m)
EF0	A weak and sporadic tornado tracked over half of Flagler county's width and caused minor structure damage. Intermittent tree damage also occurred.						
EF0	Belleair Bluffs	Pinellas	FL	27.9163°N 82.8303°W	15:34–15:35	0.42 mi (0.68 km)	15 yd (14 m)
EF0	A very brief tornado was observed over the Intracoastal Waterway along the Belleair Causeway (CR 416). It then moved onshore where it damaged the roof of an apartment building before quickly dissipating.						
EFU	NNE of Arlington	Kiowa	CO	38.43°N 103.31°W	17:25	unknown	unknown
EFU	A well-defined landspout was photographed over open land.						
EF0	NE of Bertrand	Phelps	NE	40.5706°N 99.5794°W	18:05–18:08	1.82 mi (2.93 km)	30 yd (27 m)
EF0	A central irrigation pivot was flipped and a house suffered minor roof damage with lawn furniture tossed.						
EFU	S of Overton	Dawson	NE	40.69°N 99.52°W	18:20	0.01 mi (0.016 km)	20 yd (18 m)
EFU	A brief tornado just south of I-80 was reported by storm chasers and captured on video. No damage was found.						
EFU	WNW of Beloit	Mitchell	KS	39.4776°N 98.1799°W	20:39	0.01 mi (0.016 km)	20 yd (18 m)
EFU	A brief tornado just south of US 24/K-9 was captured on video. No damage was found.						
EF1	ESE of Hildreth to S of Minden	Franklin, Kearney	NE	40.3196°N 99.0061°W	20:43–20:53	6.29 mi (10.12 km)	75 yd (69 m)
EF1	A low-end EF1 tornado struck a farmstead, damaging a house and a silo and snapping trees. Elsewhere, central irrigation pivots were flipped and damaged and field debris was blown into power lines and bushes.						
EF0	ESE of Prosser	Adams	NE	40.6672°N 98.5522°W	21:43–21:45	1.25 mi (2.01 km)	170 yd (160 m)
EF0	Corn stalks were flattened or damaged; one stalk was thrown into a power line. Minor tree damage also occurred.						
EFU	SSW of Doniphan	Hall	NE	40.7327°N 98.394°W	22:04	0.01 mi (0.016 km)	20 yd (18 m)
EFU	A brief tornado just west of US 281 was reported by storm chasers and captured on video. No damage was found.						
EFU	NE of Ellsworth	Ellsworth	KS	38.81°N 98.17°W	22:15	unknown	unknown
EFU	A tornado was reported.						

=== October 13 event ===
List of confirmed tornadoes - Friday, October 13, 2023
EF#	Location	County / Parish	State	Start Coord.	Time (UTC)	Path length	Max width
EF0	SW of Clare	Webster	IA	42.5496°N 94.3852°W	19:12–19:13	0.24 mi (0.39 km)	25 yd (23 m)
EF0	A brief tornado was videoed over open, rural farmland causing no damage.						
EF0	Southeastern Newton	Jasper	IA	41.6785°N 93.0129°W	21:09–21:12	0.64 mi (1.03 km)	80 yd (73 m)
EF0	A weak tornado was captured on video near Iowa Speedway moving across I-80. Very minor damage was inflicted to the top of a building with a small section of tin removed.						
EF1	N of Versailles	Brown	IL	39.9548°N 90.6636°W	23:08–23:10	0.42 mi (0.68 km)	25 yd (23 m)
EF1	A high-end EF1 tornado damaged a double-wide residence, the adjacent garage, and a carport. The home experienced some roof loss. Several trees on and around the property sustained damage. A person was also injured.						

=== October 25 event ===
List of confirmed tornadoes - Wednesday, October 25, 2023
EF#	Location	County / Parish	State	Start Coord.	Time (UTC)	Path length	Max width
EF0	SSW of Wynnewood	Garvin	OK	34.58°N 97.206°W	21:58	0.3 mi (0.48 km)	20 yd (18 m)
EF0	Motorists on I-35 observed and filmed a weak tornado.						
EF0	SE of Johnson	Pottawatomie	OK	35.381°N 96.791°W	23:30–23:31	0.5 mi (0.80 km)	20 yd (18 m)
EF0	A weak TDS showed up on radar and the only damage noted were to branches that had been previously cut from trees that were blown around.						

=== October 26 event ===
List of confirmed tornadoes - Thursday, October 26, 2023
EF#	Location	County / Parish	State	Start Coord.	Time (UTC)	Path length	Max width
EF0	W of Alum	Wilson	TX	29.2796°N 97.9853°W	11:35–11:56	5.99 mi (9.64 km)	50 yd (46 m)
EF0	A weak tornado snapped and uprooted trees.						
EF0	San Antonio to Alamo Heights	Bexar	TX	29.4195°N 98.4692°W	13:01–13:18	5.17 mi (8.32 km)	150 yd (140 m)
EF0	A tornado caused very minor, sporadic tree damage in eastern San Antonio and lifted metal roof panels in a railyard. More damage occurred within Fort Sam Houston including lofted trampolines, roof damage to a building, and significant tree damage. The tornado then entered the suburbs of San Antonio, damaging the roof of an apartment building and a school before lifting.						
EF0	ESE of Niederwald	Caldwell	TX	29.9595°N 97.7086°W	13:05–13:07	0.49 mi (0.79 km)	10 yd (9.1 m)
EF0	A construction site was slightly damaged.						
EF0	Cibolo	Guadalupe	TX	29.5774°N 98.2526°W	13:39–13:47	2.02 mi (3.25 km)	100 yd (91 m)
EF0	Minor damage occurred to fences and trees. Shingle damage also occurred to several homes.						
EF0	ENE of Sattler	Comal	TX	29.8448°N 98.1193°W	14:12–14:13	0.3 mi (0.48 km)	30 yd (27 m)
EF0	A weak tornado damaged some trees and fences.						

=== October 28 event ===
List of confirmed tornadoes - Saturday, October 28, 2023
EF#	Location	County / Parish	State	Start Coord.	Time (UTC)	Path length	Max width
EFU	NNE of Battle	McLennan	TX	31.57°N 96.89°W	21:54	0.01 mi (0.016 km)	3 yd (2.7 m)
EFU	A video was posted on social media of a brief tornado. No known damage occurred.						

== November ==
Confirmed tornadoes by Enhanced Fujita rating
EFU	EF0	EF1	EF2	EF3	EF4	EF5	Total
0	9	10	0	0	0	0	19

=== November 5 event ===
List of confirmed tornadoes - Sunday, November 5, 2023
EF#	Location	County / Parish	State	Start Coord.	Time (UTC)	Path length	Max width
EF0	NE of Canyon City	Grant	OR	44.3983°N 118.9123°W	20:59–21:04	0.23 mi (0.37 km)	75 yd (69 m)
EF0	A high-end EF0 tornado inflicted roof damage to a manufactured home and an open hay shelter, moved a travel trailer several feet, and uprooted a tree in saturated soil.						

=== November 15 event ===
List of confirmed tornadoes - Wednesday, November 15, 2023
EF#	Location	County / Parish	State	Start Coord.	Time (UTC)	Path length	Max width
EF0	Big Pine Key	Monroe	FL	24.6918°N 81.3726°W	11:27–11:28	0.13 mi (0.21 km)	70 yd (64 m)
EF0	This weak tornado twisted a fence, tore siding off a home, and downed or snapped a few trees.						

=== November 19 event ===
List of confirmed tornadoes - Sunday, November 19, 2023
EF#	Location	County / Parish	State	Start Coord.	Time (UTC)	Path length	Max width
EF1	Star Valley	Gila	AZ	34.251°N 111.272°W	16:39–16:49	2.4 mi (3.9 km)	100 yd (91 m)
EF1	A rare high-altitude tornado went through the small town of Star Valley and damaged 20 structures (primarily manufactured homes). Several roofs were "partially removed".						

=== November 20 event ===
List of confirmed tornadoes - Monday, November 20, 2023
EF#	Location	County / Parish	State	Start Coord.	Time (UTC)	Path length	Max width
EF1	WSW of Gorum to SSE of Janie	Natchitoches	LA	31.4099°N 93.0282°W	20:32–20:46	8.77 mi (14.11 km)	150 yd (140 m)
EF1	A tornado tracked across the Kisatchie National Forest to the Gorum area, with many trees being snapped or uprooted. A portion of the tin roof was ripped off a home, a tree fell on another home, a camper was blown over on its side, and a doublewide had its roof removed.						
EF0	SSW of Cora	Vernon	LA	31.1047°N 92.8845°W	23:17–23:22	1.42 mi (2.29 km)	75 yd (69 m)
EF0	A tornado just east of Fort Johnson downed several trees.						
EF0	NW of Woodworth	Rapides	LA	31.1975°N 92.5551°W	23:58–00:08	2.83 mi (4.55 km)	50 yd (46 m)
EF0	Several trees were downed.						
EF1	S of Sharon	Madison	MS	32.604°N 89.94°W	00:01–00:07	2.29 mi (3.69 km)	350 yd (320 m)
EF1	A tornado east of Canton downed several trees and damaged a few small buildings.						
EF0	SE of Alexandria	Rapides	LA	31.2°N 92.4°W	00:22	0.1 mi (0.16 km)	40 yd (37 m)
EF0	A weak tornado damaged some trees.						
EF1	NNE of Heucks to N of Tyrus	Lincoln, Lawrence	MS	31.681°N 90.35°W	00:29–00:43	9.04 mi (14.55 km)	100 yd (91 m)
EF1	A tin roof was peeled off a shed and several trees were either snapped or uprooted.						
EF0	ESE of Ofahoma	Leake	MS	32.694°N 89.6708°W	00:36–00:37	0.83 mi (1.34 km)	50 yd (46 m)
EF0	A brief tornado downed a couple of trees.						
EF0	WSW of Bush	Simpson	MS	31.8603°N 90.0208°W	00:36–00:44	3.3 mi (5.3 km)	75 yd (69 m)
EF0	Several trees were downed.						
EF1	Marksville to N of Bordelonville	Avoyelles	LA	31.1316°N 92.0673°W	00:55–01:14	9.64 mi (15.51 km)	300 yd (270 m)
EF1	This tornado began in Marksville and moved east-northeastward. Several homes were damaged in and northeast of Marksville and numerous trees and power lines were downed. One tree fell through a small home. The tornado lifted right before entering the Lake Ophelia National Wildlife Refuge.						
EF1	Northeastern Cottonport to NNE of Simmesport	Avoyelles	LA	30.9897°N 92.0419°W	01:20–01:46	14.91 mi (24.00 km)	300 yd (270 m)
EF1	Homes in Cottonport sustained substantial damage to roofs and carports, numerous trees were downed along the path, and an old home was collapsed north of Simmesport.						
EF1	NE of Big Bend to ESE of Shaw	Avoyelles, Concordia	LA	31.18°N 91.72°W	01:35–01:47	6.72 mi (10.81 km)	300 yd (270 m)
EF1	The actual start point is unknown due to lack of accessible roads in the area. Considerable hardwood and cedar tree damage occurred along the path before the tornado lifted near the Mississippi River.						
EF0	WNW of Magee	Simpson	MS	31.8869°N 89.7847°W	01:43–01:44	0.21 mi (0.34 km)	50 yd (46 m)
EF0	A brief tornado downed several small trees and large tree limbs.						
EF1	N of Center Ridge	Smith	MS	31.939°N 89.4845°W	02:09–02:13	2.94 mi (4.73 km)	200 yd (180 m)
EF1	A chicken house and several other buildings were damaged, one barn was damaged, and three mobile homes had siding or skirting damage with one also losing its porch. Several trees were either snapped or uprooted and large tree limbs were snapped off.						
EF1	Little Springs	Franklin	MS	31.3862°N 90.7459°W	03:22–03:26	1.21 mi (1.95 km)	100 yd (91 m)
EF1	A high-end EF1 tornado removed much of the roof from a brick house, caused roof damage to a second house, destroyed two sheds, and snapped several pine trees.						

=== November 21 event ===
List of confirmed tornadoes - Tuesday, November 21, 2023
EF#	Location	County / Parish	State	Start Coord.	Time (UTC)	Path length	Max width
EF1	NE of Highfalls to NNE of Hartford	Geneva	AL	31.1177°N 85.7616°W	23:04–23:15	6.07 mi (9.77 km)	50 yd (46 m)
EF1	Several metal chicken houses were damaged, an outbuilding and a barn were heavily damaged, and many trees were either snapped or uprooted.						
EF0	S of Leeds	Chester	SC	34.609°N 81.38°W	01:43–01:44	0.04 mi (0.064 km)	20 yd (18 m)
EF0	Several tree limbs were snapped off and one tree was split by a very brief tornado.						

== December ==
Confirmed tornadoes by Enhanced Fujita rating
EFU	EF0	EF1	EF2	EF3	EF4	EF5	Total
0	5	11	4	1	0	0	21

=== December 1 event ===
List of confirmed tornadoes - Friday, December 1, 2023
EF#	Location	County / Parish	State	Start Coord.	Time (UTC)	Path length	Max width
EF0	Eastern Poplarville	Pearl River	MS	30.833°N 89.5209°W	12:10–12:11	0.29 mi (0.47 km)	75 yd (69 m)
EF0	A few trees were downed, three sheds sustained roof and wall damage, and a car port was also destroyed.						

=== December 9 event ===
List of confirmed tornadoes – Saturday, December 9, 2023
EF#	Location	County / Parish	State	Start Coord.	Time (UTC)	Path length	Max width
EF1	NNE of Yorkville to S of Sharon to SSE of Dresden	Gibson, Weakley	TN	36.1175°N 89.0601°W	17:32–18:03	24.91 mi (40.09 km)	600 yd (550 m)
EF1	This long-tracked tornado was the first one associated with the long-lived Clarksville supercell. The tornado touched down at mid-EF1 intensity as it began snapping hardwood trees. A home was heavily damaged near the beginning of the path and its carport was demolished. Trees next to the home were snapped. As the tornado passed northwest of the town of Rutherford, it ripped the roof and some walls off of two homes. After crossing US 45 to the north of Rutherford, an outbuilding was severely damaged and several hardwood trees were snapped at high-end EF1 intensity. In this area, the tornado also damaged the Gibson County Rescue 9 fire station and flipped a semi-truck and a van. After continuing to the northeast, the tornado continued damaging multiple homes, tearing roofs off and snapping hardwood trees for several miles. The tornado then entered the community of Kimery at low-to-mid EF1 intensity, damaging several structures. After exiting Kimery, the tornado passed south of Sharon, where it reached its peak intensity as it snapped several wooden utility poles and hardwood trees with winds estimated at 110 mph (180 km/h). As the tornado passed south of Dresden, it maintained EF1 intensity and caused a stretch of concentrated damage along Summers Road. A double-wide mobile home was rolled off its foundation, injuring two people inside. Several homes and businesses were damaged before the tornado struck the National Guard Armory on SR 22, causing minor damage. The tornado dissipated soon after impacting the armory. In total, the tornado injured three people.						
EF1	Indian Mound to S of Fort Campbell	Stewart, Montgomery	TN	36.4931°N 87.7453°W	19:19–19:32	8.75 mi (14.08 km)	75 yd (69 m)
EF1	This tornado, which was the second one associated with the long-lived Clarksville supercell, touched down just east of the Cumberland River at EF1 intensity, snapping several hardwood trees and causing minor damage to a home. The tornado began moving northeast towards the community of Indian Mound, snapping dozens of trees and uprooting several others. As the tornado entered Indian Mound, it damaged several structures, including a church overhang awning, greenhouses, barns, and outbuildings. On the northeastern side of Indian Mound, the tornado reached its peak intensity as it snapped several hardwood trees at high-end EF1 intensity with winds estimated at 110 mph (180 km/h). For several miles, the tornado crossed and/or paralleled Gillum Hollow Road, where it struck dozens of structures and snapped or uprooted dozens of trees at EF1 intensity. The tornado lifted close to US 79.						
EF3	Northern Clarksville, TN to Southern Allensville, KY to SE of Auburn, KY	Montgomery (TN), Todd (KY), Logan (KY), Simpson (KY)	TN, KY	36.5746°N 87.4718°W	19:41–20:49	47.22 mi (75.99 km)	600 yd (550 m)
EF3	4 deaths – See article on this tornado – 62 people were injured.						
EF1	Southern Bowling Green	Warren	KY	36.924°N 86.45°W	21:07–21:13	2.24 mi (3.60 km)	125 yd (114 m)
EF1	This tornado destroyed a greenhouse, inflicted roof and siding damage to numerous homes, two metal warehouses, and a hotel, and snapped or uprooted trees. The last produced by the Clarksville supercell, the tornado maintained low-EF1 intensity though most of its track, damaging several structures. Winds were estimated to be 90 mph (140 km/h). The tornado tracked just south of the path of the deadly EF3 tornado nearly two years earlier.						
EF2	N of Cumberland Furnace	Dickson	TN	36.2793°N 87.4138°W	21:29–21:39	5.8 mi (9.3 km)	300 yd (270 m)
EF2	A strong tornado developed over a rural area before eventually striking multiple residences, toppling exterior walls and demolishing a double-wide mobile home. Two people were injured.						
EF2	N of White Bluff to WNW of Nashville	Dickson, Cheatham, Davidson	TN	36.1601°N 87.2335°W	22:03–22:27	18.37 mi (29.56 km)	500 yd (460 m)
EF2	This strong tornado, the first associated with the Hendersonville supercell, touched down in eastern Dickson County, snapping and uprooting several trees and destroying an outbuilding. It quickly intensified to low-end EF2 strength as it demolished a single story manufactured home. It then minorly damaged high-tension power lines and continued to snap large trees as it moved into Cheatham County. Uprooted trees and minor roof damage occurred in the Griffintown area of Cheatham County. Sporadic tree damage was noted as it moved into the Cheatham Wildlife Management Area. It strengthened once more, causing severe structural damage to homes along Dry Creek Road south of Ashland City. It then crossed into Davidson County, crossing the Cumberland River, where additional homes sustained damage before it dissipated.						
EF2	Southern Springfield	Robertson	TN	36.4689°N 86.9078°W	22:16–22:25	6 mi (9.7 km)	300 yd (270 m)
EF2	The tornado, which was produced by the same storm that spawned the Cumberland Furnace EF2 tornado, touched down next to the NorthCrest Medical Center and began moving to the northeast, where it caused minor damage to several homes. It snapped or uprooted several softwood trees in this area. As it crossed US 41, it quickly strengthened as it struck several businesses, causing low-end EF2 damage to five businesses and high-end EF1 damage to several others. A large Kroger store sustained mid-EF1 damage from the tornado, and 25 vehicles in the parking lot were flipped by the tornado, with some being thrown into a nearby ditch. The tornado reached its peak intensity after striking the Kroger as it impacted the Burley Stabilization Corporation (BSC) building, which was destroyed, with winds estimated at 120 mph (190 km/h). The National Weather Service noted the support columns holding the warehouse-like building up had grade 5 bolts anchoring them. EF1 damage occurred to nearby businesses and a metal utility pole was bent. It then weakened as it entered a subdivision along Greystone Drive, where it caused only minor damage to a few homes. After impacting the subdivision, the tornado strengthened back to EF1 intensity as it struck a few homes and vehicles along Roy Pitt Road. The tornado dissipated near Oakland Road and SR 76. In total, the tornado injured four people.						
EF2	WSW of Madison to Hendersonville to NW of Hartsville	Davidson, Sumner, Trousdale	TN	36.255°N 86.7852°W	22:39–23:31	34.77 mi (55.96 km)	400 yd (370 m)
EF2	3 deaths – See article on this tornado – 22 people were injured.						
EF1	SE of Gamaliel, KY	Clay (TN), Monroe (KY)	TN, KY	36.6169°N 85.723°W	00:07–00:11	2.86 mi (4.60 km)	50 yd (46 m)
EF1	This brief tornado was the last one produced by the Hendersonville supercell. A home had its porch destroyed, numerous trees were blown down, and chicken barns were damaged.						
EF0	N of Braxton to S of Puckett	Simpson, Rankin	MS	32.0455°N 89.9858°W	03:18–03:35	13.93 mi (22.42 km)	350 yd (320 m)
EF0	This tornado, which closely straddled the Simpson-Rankin county line, damaged trees, one of which was toppled onto power lines.						
EF0	W of Raleigh	Smith	MS	32.0238°N 89.619°W	03:44–03:49	3.71 mi (5.97 km)	75 yd (69 m)
EF0	This tornado developed soon after the previous one occluded, causing damage to trees and vegetation, one of which included a fallen tree, which fell onto a house.						
EF1	NNW of Montrose to Enterprise	Jasper, Clarke	MS	32.2123°N 89.2779°W	04:04–04:42	27.21 mi (43.79 km)	350 yd (320 m)
EF1	This small but long-lived tornado snapped and uprooted numerous trees in its path. The tornado then crossed into Clarke County, passing near Enterprise, where both trees and power lines were downed before it dissipated. The path was inaccessible at certain points due to the lack of roads.						

=== December 10 event ===
List of confirmed tornadoes – Sunday, December 10, 2023
EF#	Location	County / Parish	State	Start Coord.	Time (UTC)	Path length	Max width
EF1	Homewood	Jefferson	AL	33.4434°N 86.837°W	06:09–06:12	3.02 mi (4.86 km)	600 yd (550 m)
EF1	A tornado embedded within a larger area of straight-line wind damage heavily damaged a five-story office building, blowing out the windows, and heavily damaged a tire business. Two hotels, several stores, and a few apartment buildings sustained roof damage, a hotel sign was blown out, and a vehicle was flipped. Much of the path consisted of many snapped or uprooted trees falling on homes, vehicles, and power lines. The tornado dissipated near Samford University.						
EF1	Homewood to Mountain Brook	Jefferson	AL	33.4685°N 86.7849°W	06:13–06:15	1.78 mi (2.86 km)	200 yd (180 m)
EF1	A second tornado embedded within a larger area of straight-line wind damage developed just east of Samford University, and moved across US 31 and US 280 near Brookwood Village. Numerous trees were downed, with several falling on homes and power lines.						
EF0	N of Clopton to S of Bakerhill	Barbour, Henry	AL	31.6234°N 85.442°W	07:19–07:37	8 mi (13 km)	200 yd (180 m)
EF0	Sporadic tree damage was observed, and a chicken farm was damaged.						
EF0	SSE of Auburn	Lee	AL	32.4649°N 85.4258°W	10:36–10:39	2.43 mi (3.91 km)	400 yd (370 m)
EF0	This brief tornado caused roof damage to one home, and minor tree damage along its path.						
EF1	NE of Westville to NNE of Caryville	Holmes	FL	30.8054°N 85.8331°W	11:30–11:37	2.97 mi (4.78 km)	250 yd (230 m)
EF1	This tornado remained over rural areas, snapping numerous trees and tree branches along its path.						
EF1	Garner	Wake	NC	35.694°N 78.652°W	17:28–17:32	1.88 mi (3.03 km)	250 yd (230 m)
EF1	A high-end EF1 tornado snapped and uprooted dozens of trees, some of which damaged homes, and tossed lawn furniture.						

=== December 17 event ===
List of confirmed tornadoes - Sunday, December 17, 2023
EF#	Location	County / Parish	State	Start Coord.	Time (UTC)	Path length	Max width
EF1	Eastern Socastee	Horry	SC	33.6837°N 78.9737°W	18:16–18:20	2.35 mi (3.78 km)	150 yd (140 m)
EF1	This tornado touched down west of Myrtle Beach, damaging numerous homes, before tracking into the Arrowhead Country Club, where it caused tree damage before dissipating. The tornado was embedded within a larger area of damaging winds from its parent storm.						

=== December 19 event ===
List of confirmed tornadoes - Tuesday, December 19, 2023
EF#	Location	County / Parish	State	Start Coord.	Time (UTC)	Path length	Max width
EF1	Northern Oroville	Butte	CA	39.52°N 121.56°W	01:40–01:42	0.36 mi (0.58 km)	90 yd (82 m)
EF1	A thunderstorm in Northern California spawned a tornado that briefly touched the ground, tearing shingles off roofs, uprooting trees, snapping limbs off trees, toppling a light pole and damaging carports. In the finalized press release for the tornado, the National Centers for Environmental Information reported the rating for the tornado was EF0, with notes the National Weather Service found EF1 damage.						

== See also ==
- Tornadoes of 2023
- List of United States tornadoes from July to August 2023
- List of United States tornadoes from January to March 2024
