= Bayou Rouge Baptist Church =

Historic church in Louisiana, United States

- U.S. National Register of Historic Places
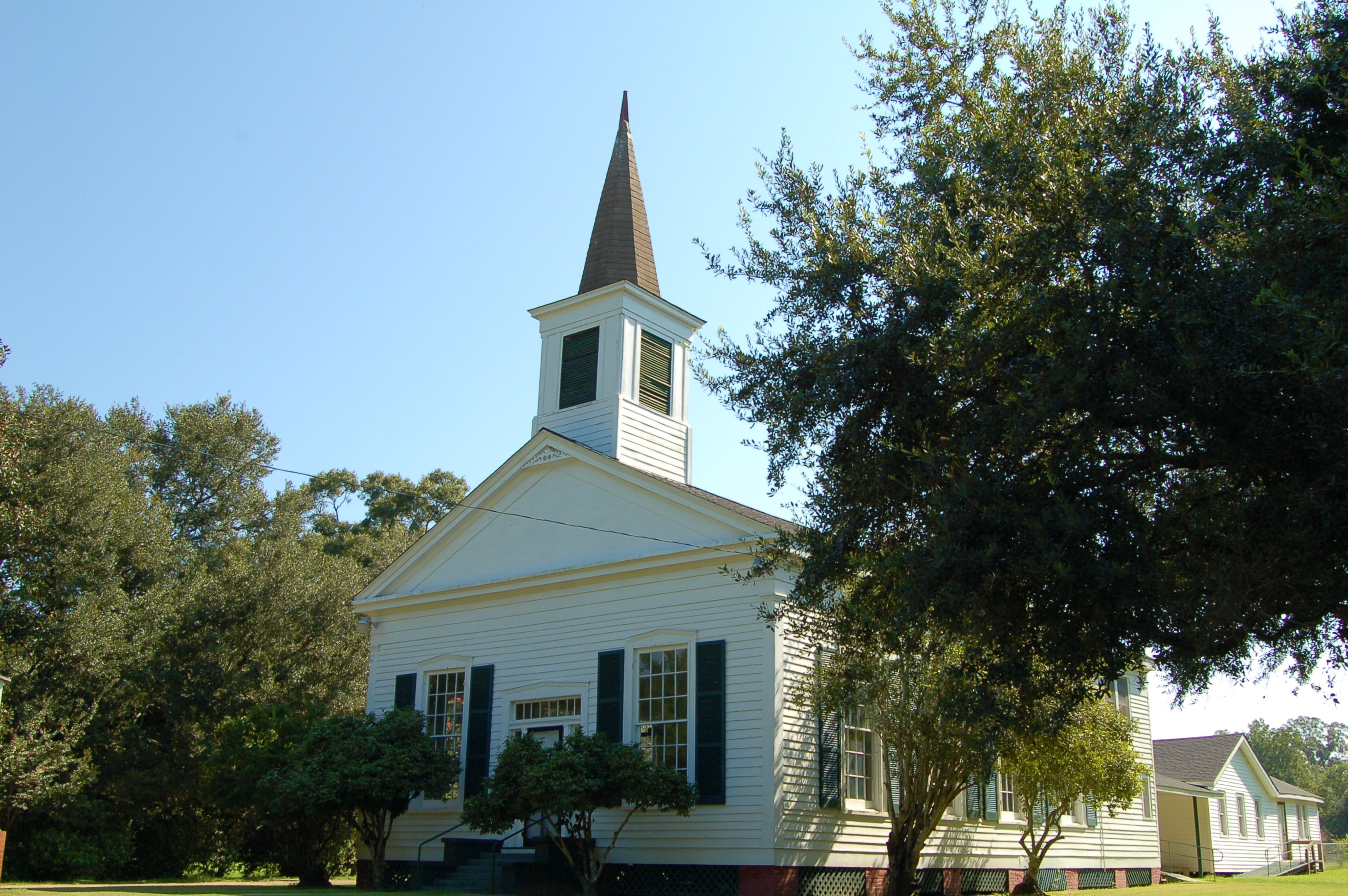

- Location within Louisiana Location within the United States
- Location: Corner of Church Street and Barron Lane, Evergreen, Louisiana
- Coordinates: 30°57′19″N 92°06′11″W
- Area: 0.25 acres (0.10 ha)
- Built: 1859
- Architectural style: Greek Revival
- NRHP reference No.: 80001696
- Added to NRHP: December 3, 1980

Bayou Rouge Baptist Church is a historic church located at the corner of Church Street and Barron Lane in Evergreen, Louisiana.

Built in 1859, the frame, 5 bay basilican plan church with a semihexagonal chancel is a classic example of a Greek Revival country church, which could be found in rural parishes from the 1830s to the Civil War. Although these churches are common in the eastern United States, there are few examples still standing in Louisiana.

The church was added to the National Register of Historic Places in 1980. The information on the Historical Registry is inaccurate. The current church was built in 1859. It is not the site of the original church established in 1841 at a different location which is in a field off of Stubblefield Road. The graves remain at the original location where it is overgrown. Very few headstones are visible. While courthouse records from 1838 show that the land was sold for a "preaching house" or "house of worship", the land surrounding the original site has changed hands over the years. While there is a right-of-way that was established, the current owner (as of April 2019) was unaware when presented with this information.

The church, at present (date being February 2020), is scheduled for a major renovation.

Much new information has surfaced on those interred in the cemetery since the last book was written in 1990 and transcripts listed online in 2010.

== See also ==
- National Register of Historic Places listings in Avoyelles Parish, Louisiana
