= Clarendon Plantation House =

Historic house in Louisiana, United States

- Formerly listed on the U.S. National Register of Historic Places
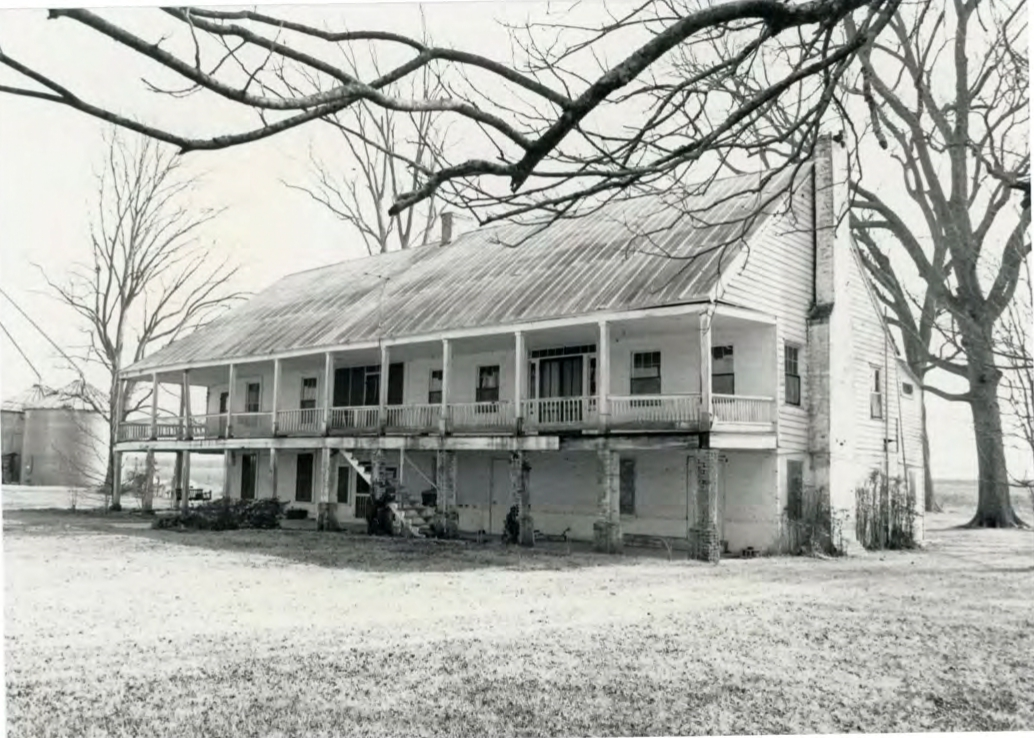

- Location within Louisiana Location within the United States
- Location: On Louisiana Highway 29, about 1.3 miles (2.1 km) west of Evergreen
- Nearest city: Evergreen, Louisiana
- Coordinates: 30°57′05″N 92°07′53″W
- Area: 1 acre (0.40 ha)
- Built: 1842
- Built by: Jonathan Koen
- Architectural style: Greek Revival
- NRHP reference No.: 85000970

Significant dates
- Added to NRHP: May 09, 1985
- Removed from NRHP: July 22, 2016

Clarendon Plantation House was a historic plantation house located about 1.3 miles (2.1 km) west of Evergreen, Louisiana. The house was built in 1842 by Jonathan Koen, and was enlarged in 1890 with several minor changes to its structure.

The house was added to the National Register of Historic Places on May 9, 1985.

It was demolished in May 1991, and was delisted on July 22, 2016.

== See also ==
- National Register of Historic Places listings in Avoyelles Parish, Louisiana
