= Belleville, Louisiana =

Unincorporated community in Avoyelles Parish, Louisiana, United States

Belleville
- unincorporated community
- Location within Louisiana Location within the United States
- Coordinates: 31°9′38″N 92°5′30″W
- Country: United States
- State: Louisiana
- Parish: Avoyelles
- Established: 1890
- Elevation: 79 ft (24 m)
- Time zone: UTC-6 (CST)
  - Summer (DST): UTC-5 (CDT)
- ZIP code: 71351
- Area code: 318

Belleville is an unincorporated community in Avoyelles Parish, Louisiana, United States. The area is home to descendants of early French settlers, Native Americans, and Creoles. The community is part of Parish Governing Authority District 2.

== Education ==
Local public schools are managed by the Avoyelles Parish School Board.

== Religion ==
The area is served by the St. Mary's Baptist Church. The church has an iconic cemetery with above-ground tombs.

== See also ==
- Marksville, Louisiana
