= Vick, Louisiana =

- Unincorporated community
- Location within Louisiana Location within the United States
- Coordinates: 31°13′49″N 92°06′20″W
- Country: United States
- State: Louisiana
- Parish: Avoyelles
- Elevation: 66 ft (20 m)
- Time zone: UTC-6 (Central (CST))
  - Summer (DST): UTC-5 (CDT)
- ZIP code: 71331
- Area code: 318
- GNIS feature ID: 543759

Vick is an unincorporated community in Avoyelles Parish, Louisiana, United States. Its ZIP code is 71331.

== Education ==
Local public schools are managed by the Avoyelles Parish School Board.
