= Oak Hall (Bunkie, Louisiana) =

Historic house in Louisiana, United States

- U.S. National Register of Historic Places
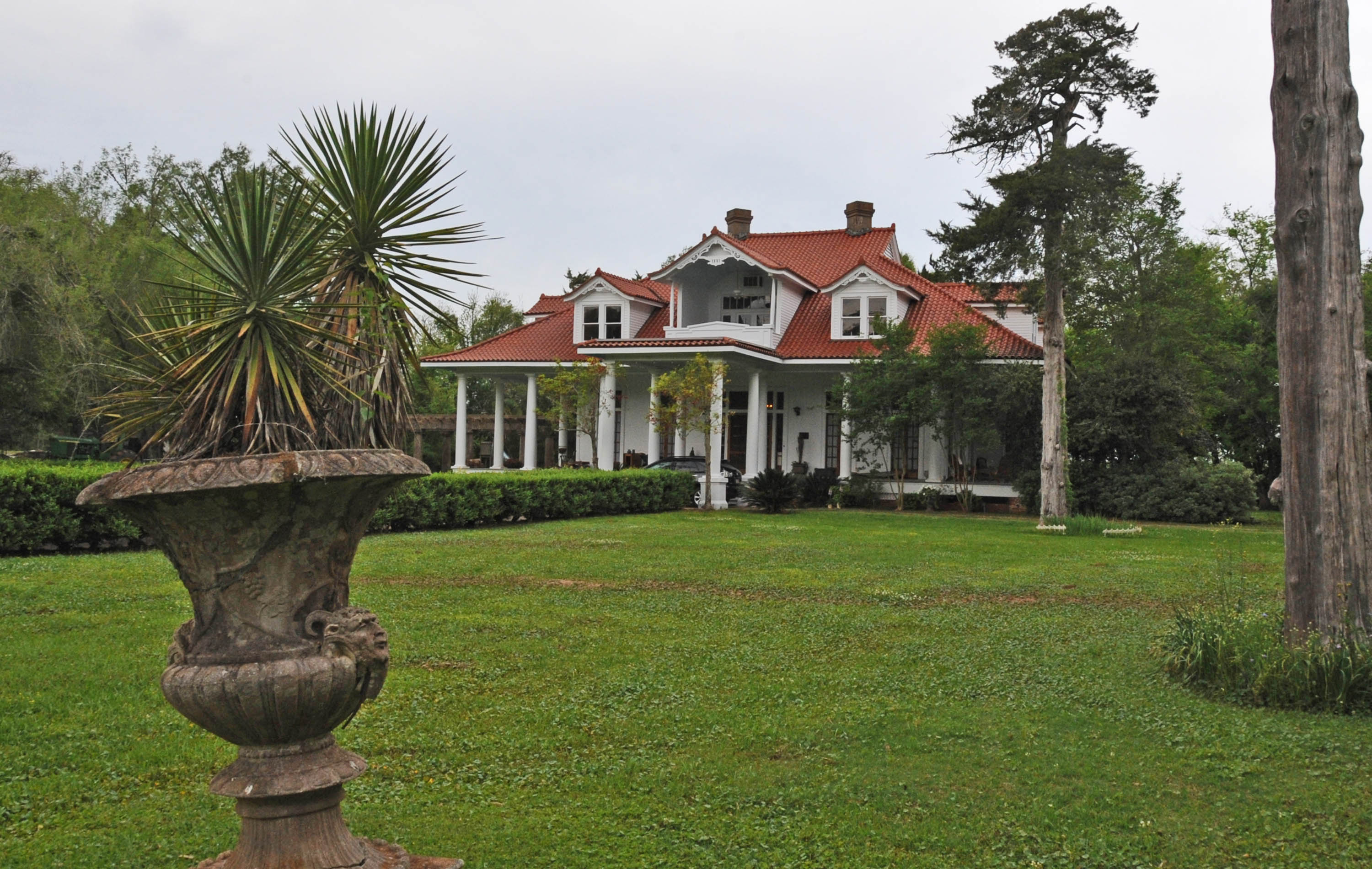

- Location within Louisiana
- Location: Along Louisiana Highway 29, about 4.5 miles (7.2 km) south of Bunkie
- Nearest city: Bunkie, Louisiana
- Coordinates: 30°53′31″N 92°12′42″W
- Area: 8 acres (3.2 ha)
- Built: 1923 and earlier
- Built by: Dr. W. D. Haas
- Architect: E. Burke Mason
- Architectural style: Bungalow/craftsman
- NRHP reference No.: 86003134
- Added to NRHP: November 6, 1986

Oak Hall is a historic residential estate located on Louisiana Highway 29, about 4.5 miles (7.2 km) south of Bunkie in Avoyelles Parish, Louisiana. The historic property comprises five Arts and Crafts-style buildings: a main house, a "Delco house", a servant's house, a gazebo with arbor, and a garage. It also includes a bridge.

New Orleans architect E. Burke Mason is credited with design for 1923 renovations.

The house was added to the National Register of Historic Places in 1986.

== See also ==
- National Register of Historic Places listings in Avoyelles Parish, Louisiana
