= Bordelonville Floodgate =

- U.S. National Register of Historic Places
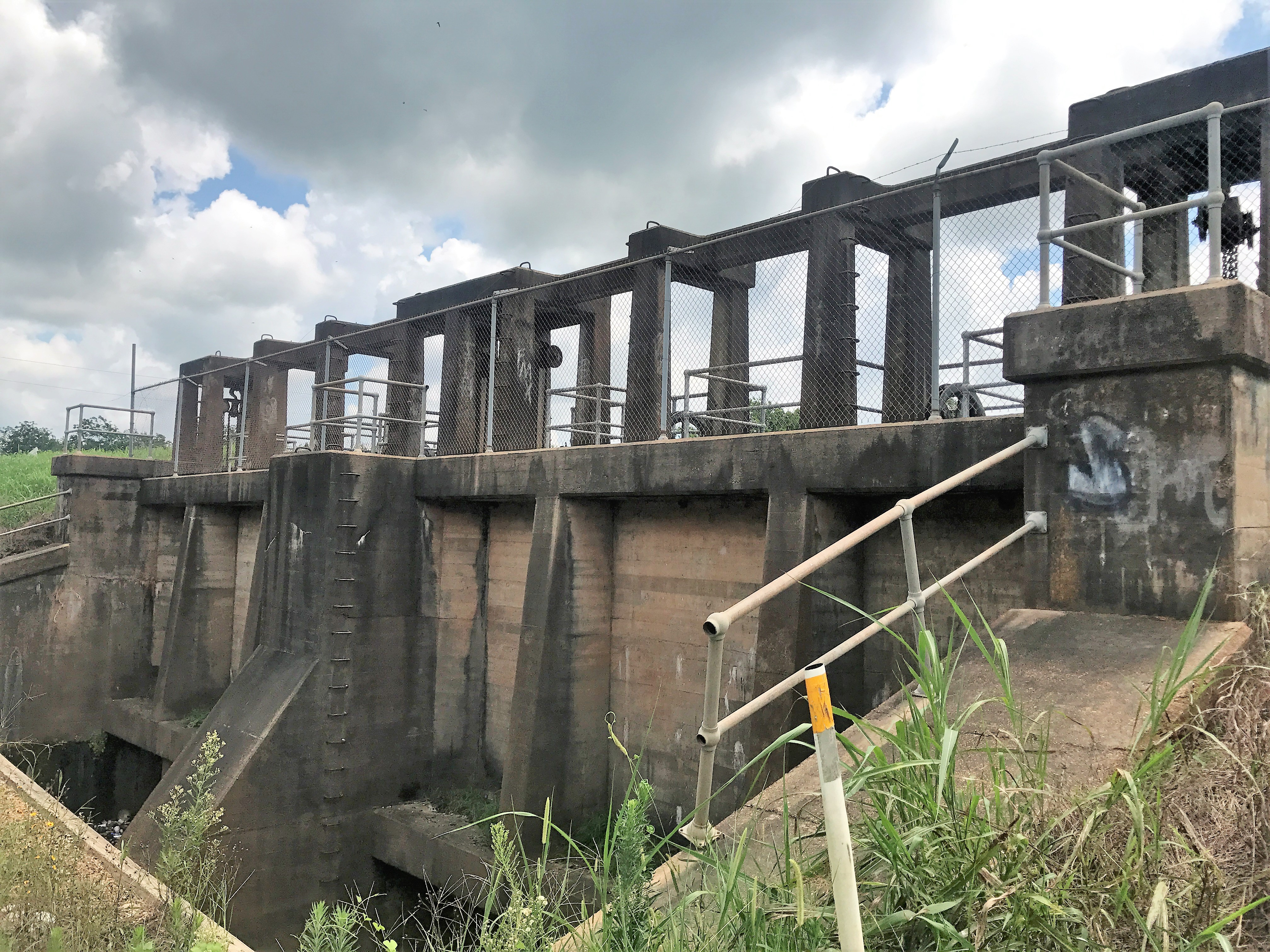

- Location within Louisiana
- Location: Siding Floodgate Crossing, north of Louisiana Highway 451, about 2.6 miles (4.2 km) east of Bordelonville
- Coordinates: 31°06′01″N 91°51′51″W
- Area: 1 acre (0.40 ha)
- Built: 1931
- NRHP reference No.: 91000277
- Added to NRHP: March 14, 1991

The Bordelonville Floodgate, in Avoyelles Parish, Louisiana near Bordelonville, Louisiana, was built during 1929 to 1931. It was listed on the National Register of Historic Places in 1991.

It was built as part of a new spillway-based system of flood control to protect the populated Bayou Des Glaises area from overflow from the Atchafalaya River, as part of larger plan mandated by the Flood Control Act of 1928.

It served its purpose until 1979, when it became redundant by the construction of larger levees surrounding it.

It is located at Siding Floodgate Crossing, north of Louisiana Highway 451, about 2.6 miles (4.2 km) east of Bordelonville.
