= Belle d'Eau, Louisiana =

Belle d'Eau
- Unincorporated community
- Interactive map of Belle d'Eau
- Coordinates: 31°05′04″N 92°11′30″W
- Country: United States
- State: Louisiana
- Parish: Avoyelles
- Elevation: 79 ft (24 m)
- GNIS feature ID: 542977

Belle d'Eau is an unincorporated community in Avoyelles Parish, Louisiana, United States.

== Education ==
Local public schools are managed by the Avoyelles Parish School Board.
