= Lake Ophelia National Wildlife Refuge =

National Wildlife Refuge in Avoyelles Parish, Louisiana

- IUCN category IV (habitat/species management area)
- Location within the United States
- Location: Avoyelles Parish, Louisiana
- Nearest city: Marksville, Louisiana
- Coordinates: 31°12′12″N 91°50′45″W
- Area: 17,500 acres (71 km^{2})
- Established: 1988
- Visitors: 25,000 (in 2004)
- Governing body: U.S. Fish and Wildlife Service
- Website: Lake Ophelia National Wildlife Refuge

Lake Ophelia National Wildlife Refuge was established in 1988 to protect the Mississippi/Red River floodplain ecosystem. The refuge is located in Avoyelles Parish, Louisiana, east central Louisiana. The refuge is named for its most prominent water body, the 350-acre (1.4 km^{2}) Lake Ophelia that was at one time a channel of the nearby Red River of the South.

== Habitat ==
The land surrounding Lake Ophelia was once part of a vast bottomland hardwood forest that stretched along the Mississippi River. Much of this forestland, including large areas of what would become Lake Ophelia National Wildlife Refuge, was cleared for agriculture in the 1970s. Levees have changed the hydrology of the refuge, but the underlying ridge/swale topography supports a variety of habitat types. Bottomland hardwood forest, croplands, fallow fields, moist soil units, and cypress-tupelo brakes are intermixed with meandering bayous, pristine lakes, ponds, sloughs, and the Red River. This variety of vegetative communities in turn supports a diversity of wildlife. Due to its location in east-central Louisiana, the refuge is served by the Mississippi and Central Flyways.

== Wildlife ==
Lake Ophelia National Wildlife Refuge supports a wide variety of wildlife species. Though established primarily for waterfowl, the refuge also is a place for all or part of the year for mammals, songbirds, fish, reptiles, and amphibians. Many of these animals are difficult to see. Hiding throughout the refuge are creatures great and small such as bobcats, alligators, red and grey fox and wild turkeys. River otter, beaver, raccoon, mink and nutria also make the refuge their home. Other animals that are more frequently seen include white-tailed deer, squirrels, little blue herons, night herons, and barred owls. Many songbirds and wading birds arrive in the spring, and the waters are full of game fish such as channel catfish, largemouth bass and crappie (white perch).

Due to its location in east-central Louisiana, this area is influenced by both the Mississippi and Central Flyways. These highways in the sky are the route for millions of duck and geese each spring and fall. Although mallards, gadwall and green-winged teal are the most abundant waterfowl species on the refuge; wood ducks, blue-winged teal, northern shovelers, northern pintails, and widgeon are also plentiful. Diving ducks such as scaup and ring-necked ducks use deeper refuge waters. Canada, snow and white-fronted geese can sometimes be observed feeding in harvested croplands.

Although mallards, northern pintails, and wood ducks are the most numerous waterfowl species on the refuge, blue- and green-winged teal, northern shovelers, gadwall, and American Widgeon are also common. Primary diving ducks are scaup and ring-necked ducks. Canada, snow, and greater white-fronted geese are present, though less common.

Several hundred native species of mammals, reptiles, amphibians, birds, fishes, and insects are found on the refuge. Common, though often difficult to see, species include bobcats, alligators, red and grey foxes, turkeys, mink, and otter. More frequently encountered are white-tailed deer, raccoons, fox squirrels, beaver, marsh hawks, and wading birds. Many neotropical migratory songbirds use the refuge at various times. Refuge fisheries are composed largely of largemouth bass, gar, crappie, bowfin, bream species, buffalo, carp, and catfish.

Endangered species numbers are few and their presence is always marked with special interest. The arctic peregrine falcon is an occasional visitor, and thanks to the refuge's three-year bald eagle reintroduction project, bald eagle sightings are common. The threatened Louisiana black bear is rarely sighted moving through the area, but is expected to reestablish as the Tensas River bear population to the north and the Atchafalaya River population to the south increase. As young bears look for new homes, the refuge and surrounding woodlands can play an important role in its recovery. Not only will this area serve as a corridor linking these two existing bear populations, but also as habitat for additional bears.

Two centuries ago the Lower Mississippi River Valley contained over 24,000,000 acres (97,000 km^{2}) of bottomland hardwood and swamp forests. Today, only 4,400,000 acres (18,000 km^{2}) of wetland forests remain, most as islands in a sea of agriculture. Gone from Lake Ophelia National Wildlife Refuge are the Florida panther and red wolf, lost forever are the ivory-billed woodpecker and Backman's warbler.

== Management ==
Lake Ophelia National Wildlife Refuge is actively managed as part of the Central Louisiana Refuges Complex, along with Catahoula National Wildlife Refuge and the Complex headquarters at Grand Cote National Wildlife Refuge, to provide a diverse habitats for the myriad of animal species that abound. Croplands, reforested uplands, bottomland hardwoods, cypress swamps and permanent waters are molded to benefit wildlife.

Refuge croplands are farmed on a share basis, leaving part of the crops in the fields for refuge wildlife. Moist soil areas are managed by lowering and raising water levels to promote natural vegetation favored by ducks and geese. During the fall and winter, croplands and naturally vegetated areas are flooded, thus "setting the table" for wintering waterfowl. In late summer, wetland pools are dried to create mudflats for migrating shorebirds.

In efforts to restore large forested block and re-link fragmented forest, several Federal and State natural resource agencies are promoting reforestation of marginal privately owned land and replanting cleared forest on public land. Lake Ophelia National Wildlife Refuge is part of these efforts. Many agricultural fields on the refuge have been planted with hardwood trees that once dominated the land. These native oaks, cypress, ash, gum, and pecan trees will help restore the bottomland hardwood and swamp forests that supported such a large diversity of wildlife.

== See also ==
- List of National Wildlife Refuges: Louisiana
