= St. Paul Lutheran Church (Mansura, Louisiana) =

Historic church in Louisiana, United States

- U.S. National Register of Historic Places
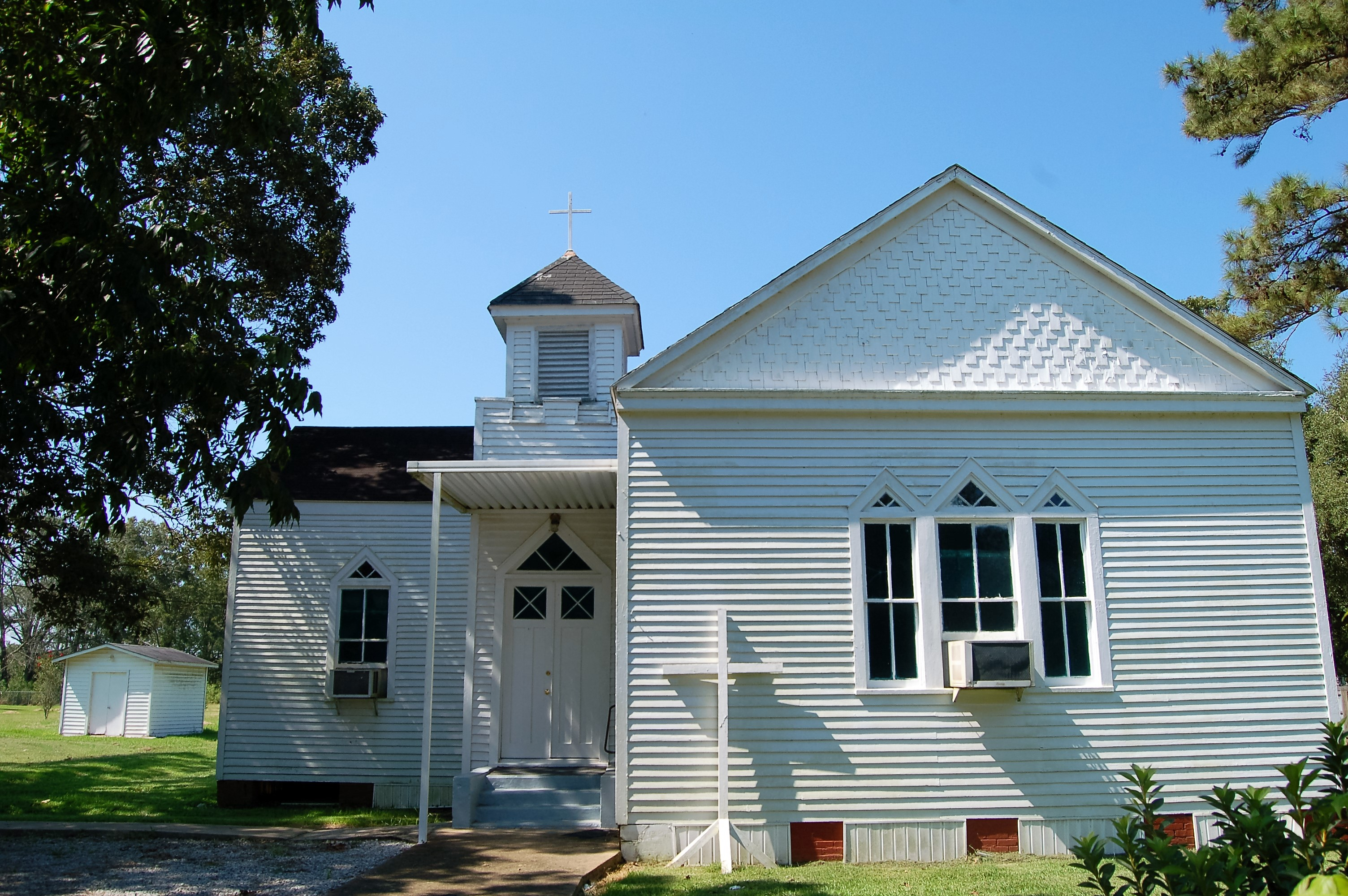

- Location within Louisiana Location within the United States
- Location: Along Louisiana Highway 107, about 2.1 miles (3.4 km) north of Mansura
- Nearest city: Mansura, Louisiana
- Coordinates: 31°05′21″N 92°02′54″W
- Area: 1 acre (0.40 ha)
- Built: 1916
- Architectural style: Queen Anne, Gothic Revival
- NRHP reference No.: 90000353
- Added to NRHP: March 1, 1990

St. Paul Lutheran Church is a small historic frame church in located about 2.1 miles (3.4 km) north of Mansura, Louisiana.

It was built in 1916 to replace a previous building and features elements of the Gothic Revival and Queen Anne Revival styles. The main historic importance of this building was its usage as a school for local residents since its construction in 1916 through the late 1930s, as it was the only available educational opportunity for local black children until it ceased to be used as a school.

The church was added to the National Register of Historic Places in 1990.

== See also ==
- National Register of Historic Places listings in Avoyelles Parish, Louisiana
