= St. Mary's Assumption Church (Cottonport, Louisiana) =

Historic church in Louisiana, United States

- U.S. National Register of Historic Places
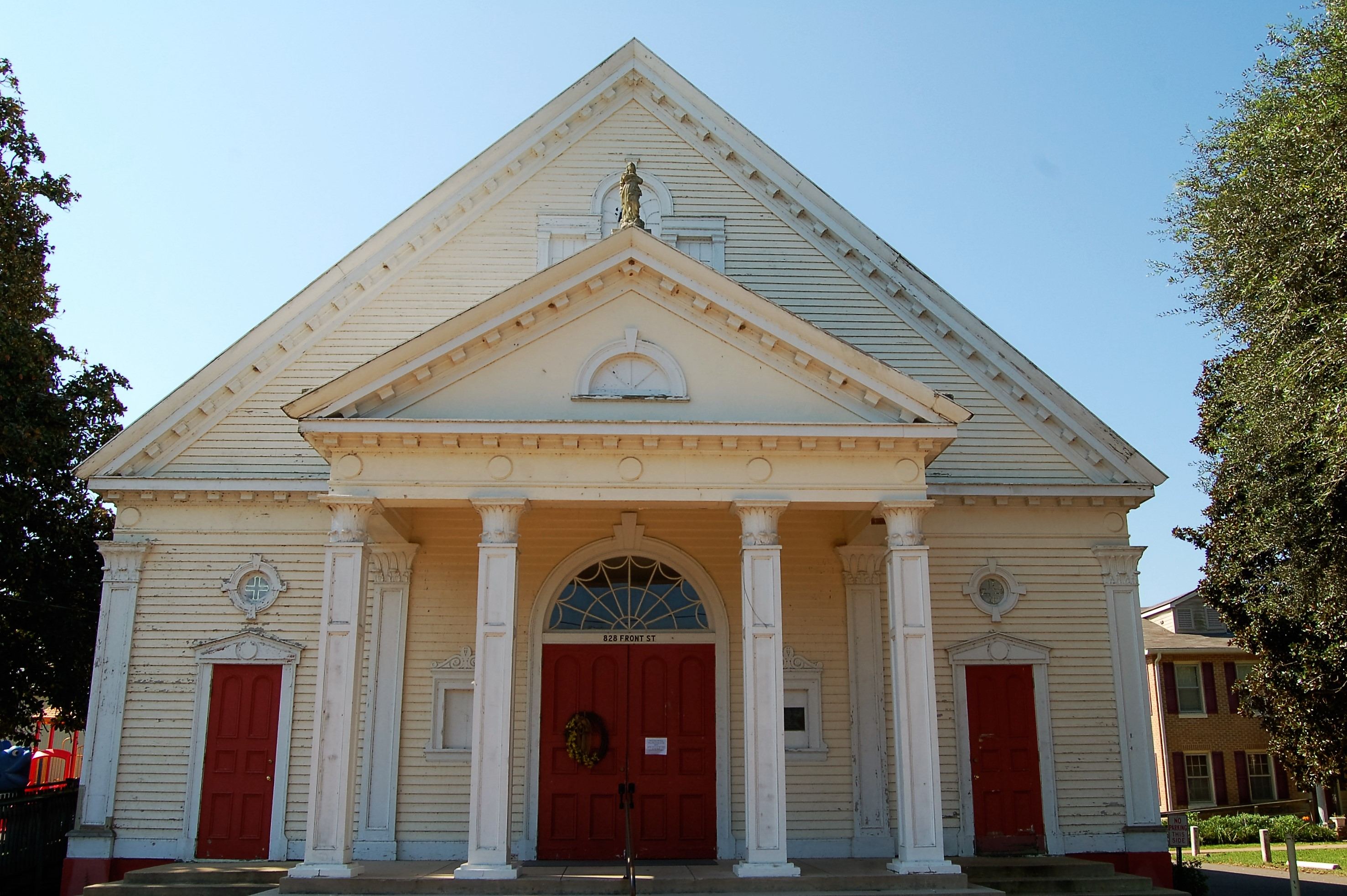

- Location within Louisiana Location within the United States
- Location: Front Street, between St. Mary Street and Cottonport Avenue, Cottonport, Louisiana
- Coordinates: 30°59′13″N 92°03′20″W
- Area: 0.2 acres (0.081 ha)
- Built: c.1889
- Architect: Sam Ducote
- Architectural style: Classical Revival
- NRHP reference No.: 89000330
- Added to NRHP: May 1, 1989

St. Mary's Assumption Church is a historic church in Classical Revival style, located on Front Street in Cottonport, Louisiana. The church is now used as a parish hall.

While the original nave dates back to c.1889, the present exterior aspect of the church is largely due to c.1918 alterations, which removed the 110 foot high tower and steeple, enlarged the nave, and reworked the facade to include a front portico. When the church was converted to a parish hall, in 1958, interiors were altered as well, with removal of the altar, tabernacle screen, statuary and all its other religious accoutrements.

The church was added to the National Register of Historic Places in 1989.

== See also ==
- National Register of Historic Places listings in Avoyelles Parish, Louisiana
