= Lionel Aldridge =

American football player (1941–1998)

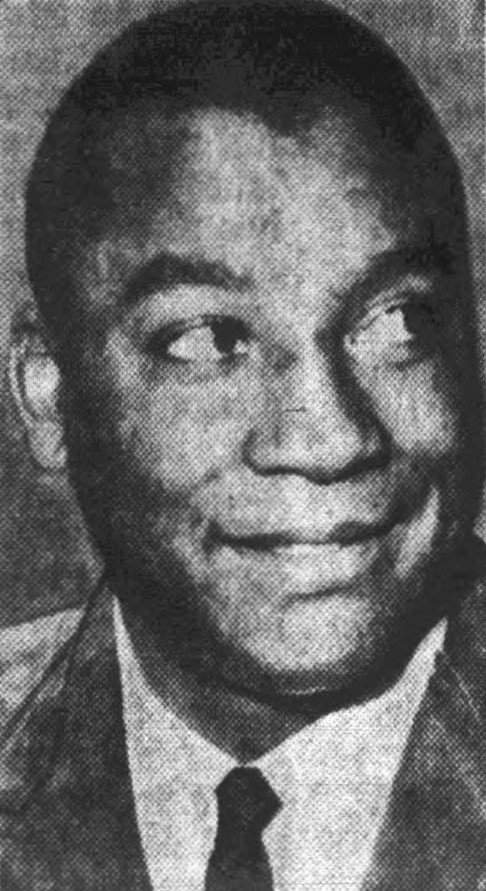
- Aldridge, circa 1962

No. 62, 82, 87
- Position: Defensive end

Personal information
- Born: February 14, 1941; Evergreen, Louisiana, U.S.
- Died: February 12, 1998 (aged 56); Shorewood, Wisconsin, U.S.
- Listed height: 6 ft 3 in (1.91 m)
- Listed weight: 254 lb (115 kg)

Career information
- High school: Pittsburg (Pittsburg, California)
- College: Utah State
- NFL draft: 1963: 4th round, 54th overall pick
- AFL draft: 1963: 6th round, 47th overall pick

Career history
- Green Bay Packers (1963–1971); San Diego Chargers (1972–1973)

Awards and highlights
- 2× Super Bowl champion (I, II); 3× NFL champion (1965, 1966, 1967); Green Bay Packers Hall of Fame

Career NFL statistics
- Fumble recoveries: 19
- Touchdowns: 1
- Sacks: 69.5
- Stats at Pro Football Reference

Lionel Aldridge (February 14, 1941 – February 12, 1998) was an American professional football player who was a defensive end in the National Football League (NFL) for 11 seasons with the Green Bay Packers and San Diego Chargers. He played college football for the Utah State Aggies.

== Early life ==
Born in Evergreen, Louisiana, Aldridge was raised by his sharecropper grandparents. After his grandfather's death when Aldridge was 15, he was sent to live with a steelworker uncle in Northern California and played high school football at Pittsburg High School. He earned an athletic scholarship and played college football at Utah State University in Logan, Utah and was co-captain of the team and an All-Skyline Conference tackle.

== NFL career ==
Aldridge was selected in the fourth round of the 1963 NFL draft, 54th overall, by the two-time defending NFL champion Green Bay Packers. One of the few rookies to start for head coach Vince Lombardi, he enjoyed an 11-year NFL career. As a Packer, he played a role in their unprecedented three straight NFL Championships (1965-66-67) and victories in Super Bowls I and II. Traded to the San Diego Chargers, Aldridge played two seasons in San Diego before retiring from professional football in 1973. He was inducted into the Green Bay Packers Hall of Fame in 1988.

== After football ==
After retiring, Aldridge worked as sports analyst at WTMJ-TV in Milwaukee and for Packers radio and NBC until manifesting paranoid schizophrenia in the late 1970s. Homeless for a time in part due to misdiagnosis, he eventually reached a form of equilibrium. He became an advocate for the homeless and the mentally ill until his death in 1998. His advocacy work included serving as a board member for the Mental Health Association of Milwaukee and working as a speaker for the National Alliance on Mental Illness.
