= Big Bend, Louisiana =

Unincorporated community in Louisiana, U.S.

Coordinates: 31°04′26″N 91°47′31″W

Big Bend is an unincorporated community in Avoyelles Parish, Louisiana, United States.

== Etymology ==
Big Bend was named from its location on a meander of the Bayou Des Glaises.

== Education ==
Local public schools are managed by the Avoyelles Parish School Board.

According to Zoning in Avoyelles, youth in Big Bend are zoned to attend:

- Riverside Elementary School, Simmesport
- Avoyelles High School, Moreauville

Schools without zoning:

- Avoyelles Public Charter School, Mansura
- Nazarene Christian Academy, Marksville
- Sacred Heart School, Moreauville
- St. Anthony of Padua School, Bunkie
- St. Joseph School, Plaucheville
- St. Mary's School, Cottonport

Magnet Schools:

- Bunkie Magnet High School, Bunkie
- LASAS (Louisiana School for the Agricultural Sciences), Bunkie
