= Hypolite Bordelon House =

- U.S. National Register of Historic Places
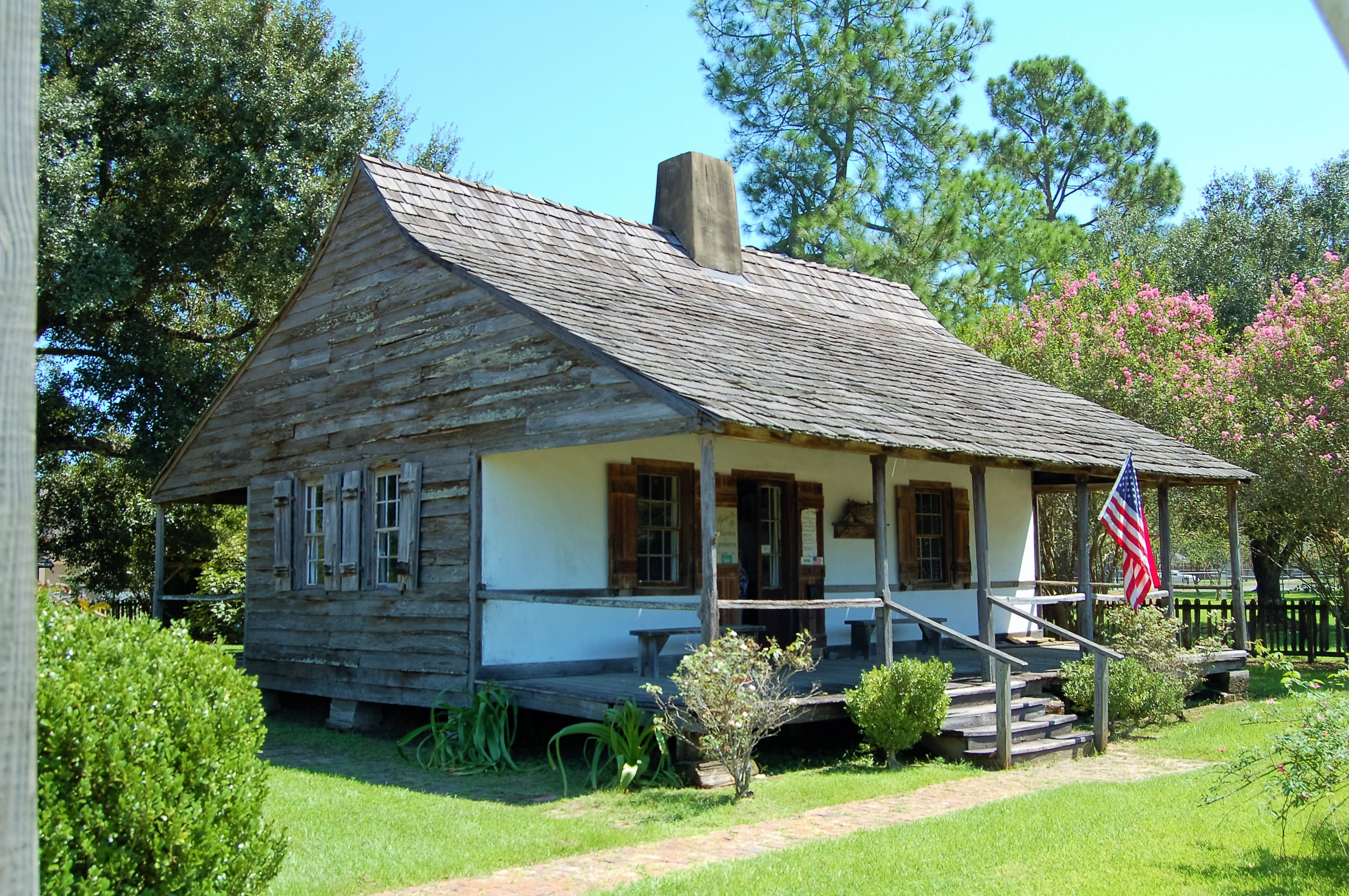

- Location within Louisiana
- Location: LA 1, Marksville, Louisiana
- Coordinates: 31°07′30″N 92°04′03″W
- Area: 1 acre (0.40 ha)
- Built: 1825
- Architectural style: Creole
- NRHP reference No.: 80001698
- Added to NRHP: October 16, 1980

The Hypolite Bordelon House, in a small park off Louisiana Highway 1 in Marksville in Avoyelles Parish, Louisiana, was built around 1825. It was listed on the National Register of Historic Places in 1980.

It is unusual for its double-pitched roof. It was built of cypress and pine, and its walls are bousillage (mud and moss).

The house "was most probably built by Valerie Bordelon, Hypolite's father. Valerie Bordelon was the grandson of the first Bordelon in Louisiana, Laurent Bordelon, who came to Louisiana before 1730 as an employee of the French trading company, the Company of the Indies. Laurent was a native of Le Havre, in the Normandy province of France."

The house was moved to its present location and restored.
