= Hamburg, Louisiana =

Unincorporated community in Louisiana, U.S.

Coordinates: 31°01′51″N 91°55′53″W

Hamburg is an unincorporated community in Avoyelles Parish, Louisiana, United States. The ZIP Code for Hamburg is 71339.

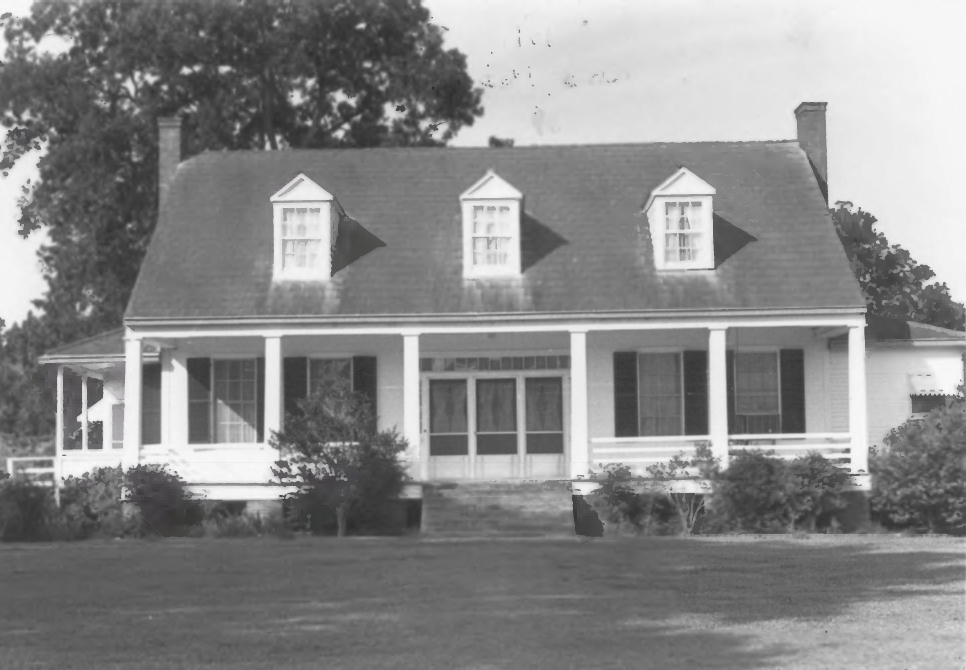
Calliham Plantation House in Hamburg, Louisiana.

== Etymology ==
A group of the early settlers being natives of Germany caused the name Hamburg to be selected.

== Education ==
Local public schools are managed by the Avoyelles Parish School Board.
