= Ray's Ferry =

Spanish-colonial era landmark

Coordinates: 30°57′1″N 92°13′25″W

Ferry License

Site of Ray's Ferry Today

Ray's Ferry in Louisiana, United States, is the point along Bayou Boeuf in Avoyelles Parish, at which the road between Opelousas and Marksville crossed the waterway. A ferry service operated here from 1816. It is unknown how long the ferry was in service. The name comes from the individual, Reuben Ray, licensed to operate the ferry service. Ray was granted a permit from the State of Louisiana on September 19, 1816, to "keep a ferry across the Bayou Boeuf on the main road leading from Opelousas to Avoyelles". The permit can be inspected at the Court Archives of Saint Landry Parish, Courthouse, Opelousas, LA.

In 1816, the main road from Opelousas to Avoyelles Courthouse served as an important connection between North and South Louisiana. The streams and bayous of this region were formidable barriers to over land travel. Bridge crossings were not only very expensive to build and maintain but obstacles to waterborne commerce. In order to encourage immigration and settlement of the new state, adjacent property owners along the few main roads that existed were often enlisted to provide a means of crossing nearby streams. These ferry crossings or landings became integral links in the developing road network.

Reuben Ray and family acquired about 640 acres along the east bank of Bayou Boeuf in 1812 three miles from the closest settlement, which was Cheneyville. James Bowie was a close neighbor between 1814 and 1816. Then a young man, he survived by cutting timber and barging it down the bayou to be sold in New Orleans. Years later he became a hero of the Texas Revolution dying in the siege of the Alamo. But, cultivation of cotton and corn were the staple crops supporting the Ray family. Around 1846 reversals in family finances forced sale of land holdings along the bayou and the family removed to southwest Rapides Parish near Glenmora.

Apparently, portions of the main road described in the permit have become Louisiana Highway 115. Today, a modern bridge carries LA 115 across the bayou at this historic site roughly two miles west of Bunkie, Louisiana. Ray's Ferry appears on General Land Survey maps of the era, notably: Map of Louisiana, Constructed from the Surveys in the General Land Office, and other documents by John Melish.

In the 1821 case of Baldwin v Stafford before the Supreme Court of Louisiana, the boundary between Post of Opelousas and Post of Rapides was fixed at Ray's Ferry. The Posts of Opelousas and Rapides were established by the Spanish colonial government. Under American administration they were abolished and replaced by a number of civil parishes including St. Landry, Rapides, and Avoyelles.

A Louisiana historic marker provides information on the crossing in both English and French.

== See also ==
- William C. C. Claiborne
