= Grand Cote National Wildlife Refuge =

National Wildlife Refuge in Avoyelles Parish, Louisiana

- IUCN category IV (habitat/species management area)
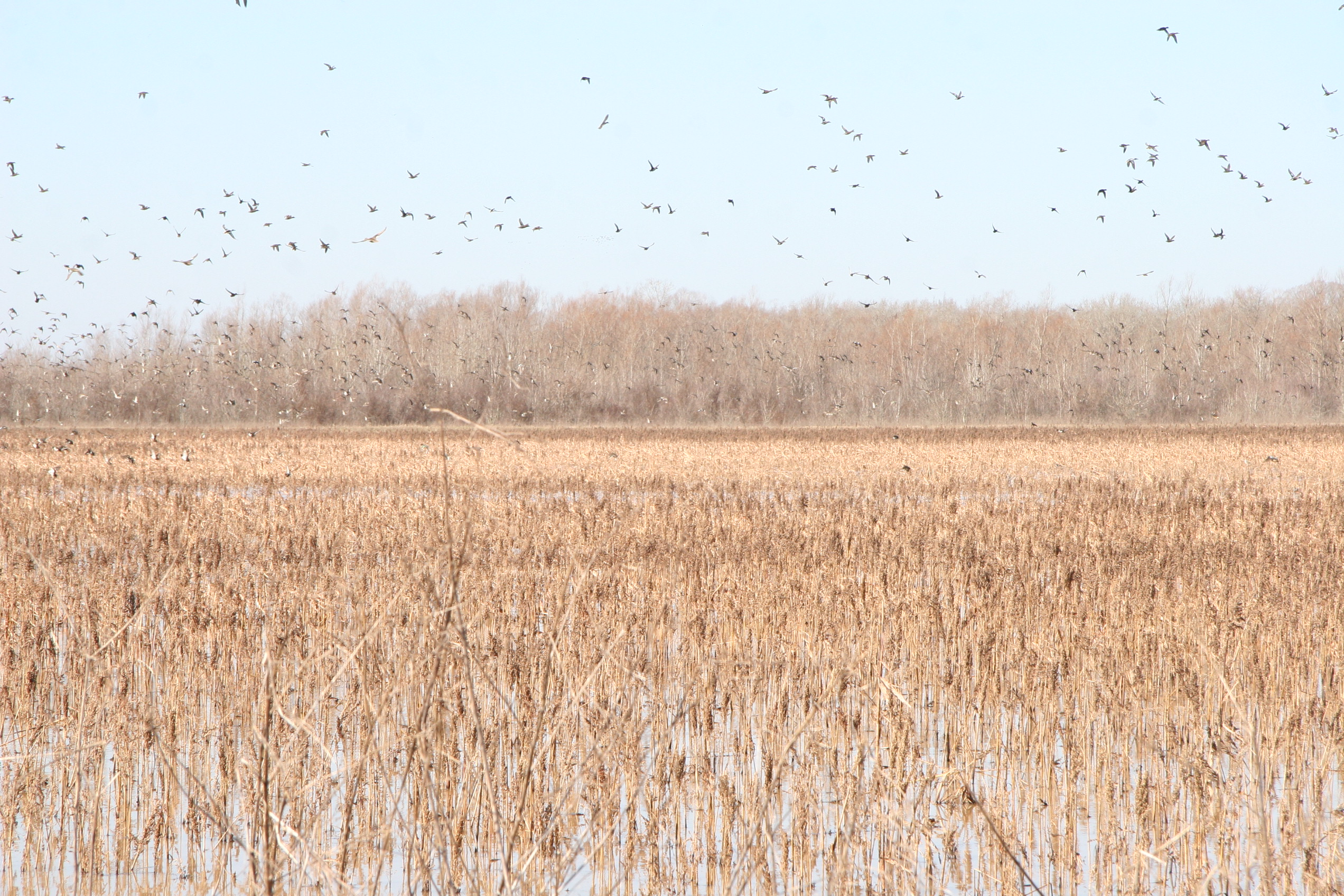
- Ducks and geese flying at the wetlands at Grand Cote National Wildlife Refuge

- Location within the United States
- Location: Avoyelles Parish, Louisiana
- Nearest city: Marksville, Louisiana
- Coordinates: 31°06′30″N 92°08′15″W
- Area: 6,077 acres (2,459 ha)
- Established: 1989
- Governing body: U.S. Fish and Wildlife Service
- Website: Grand Cote National Wildlife Refuge

Grand Cote National Wildlife Refuge

The Grand Cote National Wildlife Refuge (French: Réserve Naturelle Faunique Nationale du Grand- Côte) was established in 1989 as part of the North American Waterfowl Management Plan. It is a 6,000-acre (24 km^{2}) reserve located in Avoyelles Parish, near Marksville, Louisiana, in the United States.

== Natural history ==
Grand Cote National Wildlife Refuge was once part of the large contiguous Mississippi River bottomland hardwood forest. Topography of the refuge is characterized by a large depressional basin that fills with shallow water from winter rains and backwater flooding.

During the 1970s, the area that would become Grand Cote Refuge was cleared and leveed for agricultural purposes. The area was poorly suited for farming, but provided ideal shallow flooded habitat preferred by many waterfowl and shorebird species.

Habitat management objectives are centered on providing shallow flooded habitats for waterfowl, shorebirds, and wading birds during August through March. A special emphasis is placed on providing shallow flooded rice; native moist soil plant fields preferred by northern pintails.

Habitat found on the refuge include: 420 acres (1.7 km^{2}) forest, 2,485 acres (10.06 km^{2}) reforestation, 2,040 acres (8.3 km^{2}) cropland, 830 acres (3.4 km^{2}) moist soil and 300 acres (1.2 km^{2}) of permanent water.

Underlying soils are the typical poorly drained, nutrient-rich, clays associated with a large river floodplain. These soils are capable of supporting large numbers of resident and migratory wildlife.

== See also ==
- National Wildlife Refuge
