= Avoyelles High School =

Public school in Louisiana, United States

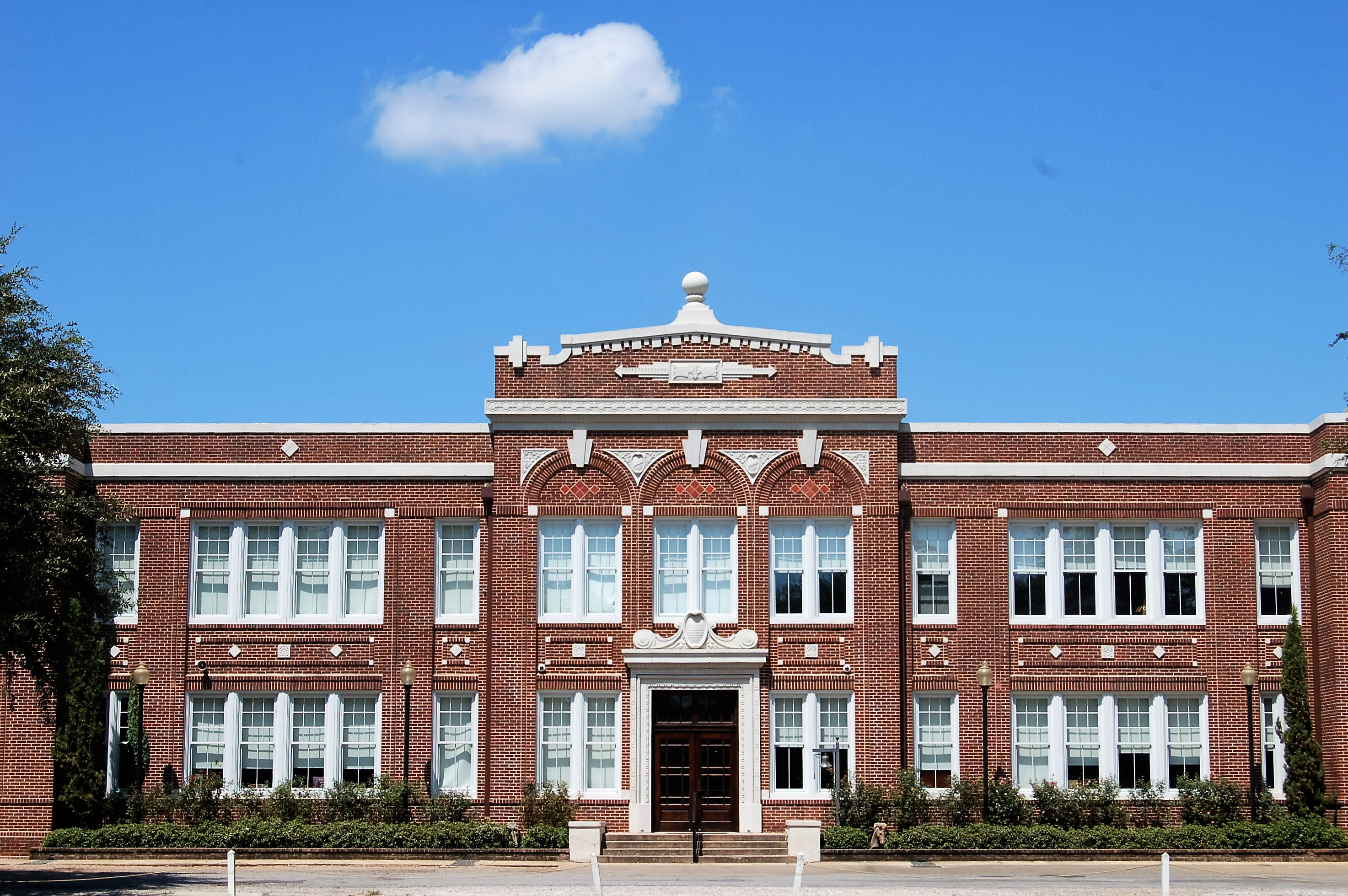

Location
- 287 Main Street; Moreauville, Louisiana; United States; 31°02′08″N 91°58′23″W

Information
- Type: Public
- Established: 1926
- School district: Avoyelles Parish School Board
- NCES School ID: 220015000075
- Principal: Michael Rachal
- Faculty: 29.25 (on FTE basis)
- Grades: 7 to 12
- Enrollment: 525 (2023–2024)
- Student to teacher ratio: 17.95
- Colors: Navy, Vegas Gold, White
- Mascot: Mustangs
- Website: ahs.avoyellespsb.com
- Moreauville High School
- U.S. National Register of Historic Places
- Area: 1.5 acres (0.61 ha)
- Built: 1926
- Architect: William T. Nolan
- Architectural style: Classical Revival
- NRHP reference No.: 08000019
- Added to NRHP: February 14, 2008

Avoyelles High School, historically known as Moreauville High School, is a public high school in Moreauville in Avoyelles Parish, Louisiana.

It educates about 630 pupils in grades 7 to 12 and is part of the Avoyelles Parish School Board. The school building is listed on the National Register of Historic Places.

== Building ==
Moreauville High School was built in 1926. It was designed by architect William T. Nolan in Classical Revival style. The school was renamed Avoyelles High School in 1988, after Avoyelles Parish reorganized its schools to implement court-ordered desegregation.

The school was added to the National Register of Historic Places in 1988 for its significance to architecture in Avoyelles Parish and to education in Moreauville.

== Athletics ==
Avoyelles High athletics competes in the LHSAA.
