= Bordelonville, Louisiana =

- Census-designated place
- Location within the state of Louisiana
- Coordinates: 31°05′58″N 91°53′05″W
- Country: United States
- State: Louisiana
- Parishes: Avoyelles

Area
  - Total: 4.35 sq mi (11.26 km^{2})
  - Land: 4.35 sq mi (11.26 km^{2})
  - Water: 0 sq mi (0.00 km^{2})
- Elevation: 49 ft (15 m)

Population (2020)
  - Total: 458
  - Density: 105.3/sq mi (40.67/km^{2})
- Time zone: UTC-6 (Central (CST))
  - Summer (DST): UTC-5 (CST)
- ZIP code: 71320
- FIPS code: 22-08745
- GNIS feature ID: 2586668

Bordelonville is an unincorporated community and census-designated place (CDP) in Avoyelles Parish, Louisiana, United States. As of the 2020 census, Bordelonville had a population of 458.

Bordelonville is located along Bayou des Glaises and Louisiana Highway 451, 17 miles (27 km) east of Marksville, the parish seat.

== Demographics ==
Historical population
Census	Pop.	Note	%±
2010	525		—
2020	458		−12.8%
U.S. Decennial Census

Bordelonville was first listed as a census designated place in the 2010 U.S. census.

== Education ==
The town was formerly home to Bordelonville High School, which seems to have closed some time in the 1980s. The building still stands today at 4462 Highway 451. The Town is part of the Avoyelles Parish School Board.

== Etymology ==
Bordelonville was named for Remi Bordelon, who was instrumental in getting the town a post office.
