= Evergreen, Louisiana =

- Town
- Location of Evergreen in Avoyelles Parish, Louisiana.

- Location of Louisiana in the United States
- Coordinates: 30°57′10″N 92°06′19″W
- Country: United States
- State: Louisiana
- Parish: Avoyelles

Area
  - Total: 1.02 sq mi (2.65 km^{2})
  - Land: 1.02 sq mi (2.65 km^{2})
  - Water: 0 sq mi (0.00 km^{2})
- Elevation: 72 ft (22 m)

Population (2020)
  - Total: 215
  - Density: 210.5/sq mi (81.26/km^{2})
- Time zone: UTC-6 (CST)
  - Summer (DST): UTC-5 (CDT)
- Area code: 318
- FIPS code: 22-24775
- GNIS feature ID: 2406474
- Website: www.evergreenla.org

Evergreen is a town in Avoyelles Parish, Louisiana, United States. As of the 2020 census, Evergreen had a population of 215. Evergreen is located east of Bunkie.

== History ==
First named "Bayou Ridge", the town's name was later changed to "Evergreen", inspired by its beautiful, evergreen magnolia trees. The first store in Evergreen was owned by Alanson Pearce and was located on the Barbreck plantation that had been established by his wife's grandfather Marsden Campbell. The town was chartered in 1869.

Evergreen was the site of an early renowned school in the area, the Evergreen Home Institute (1856), which later became Evergreen College, and then Evergreen High School in 1904.

== Geography ==
According to the United States Census Bureau, the town has a total area of 1.0 square mile (2.6 km^{2}), all land.

== Demographics ==
Historical population
Census	Pop.	Note	%±
1880	297		—
1900	322		—
1910	299		−7.1%
1920	262		−12.4%
1930	298		13.7%
1940	384		28.9%
1950	382		−0.5%
1960	325		−14.9%
1970	307		−5.5%
1980	272		−11.4%
1990	283		4.0%
2000	314		11.0%
2010	310		−1.3%
2020	215		−30.6%
2025 (est.)	208	▼	−3.3%
U.S. Decennial Census

As of the census of 2000, there were 314 people, 137 households, and 86 families residing in the town. The population density was 308.1 inhabitants per square mile (119.0/km^{2}). There were 152 housing units at an average density of 149.2 per square mile (57.6/km^{2}). The racial makeup of the town was 73.57% White, 25.80% African American and 0.64% Asian. Hispanic or Latino of any race were 0.32% of the population.

There were 137 households, out of which 26.3% had children under the age of 18 living with them, 47.4% were married couples living together, 11.7% had a female householder with no husband present, and 37.2% were non-families. 32.8% of all households were made up of individuals, and 8.0% had someone living alone who was 65 years of age or older. The average household size was 2.29 and the average family size was 2.91.

In the town, the population was spread out, with 23.6% under the age of 18, 8.0% from 18 to 24, 29.0% from 25 to 44, 26.4% from 45 to 64, and 13.1% who were 65 years of age or older. The median age was 39 years. For every 100 females, there were 92.6 males. For every 100 females age 18 and over, there were 87.5 males.

The median income for a household in the town was $17,250, and the median income for a family was $30,208. Males had a median income of $33,750 versus $18,750 for females. The per capita income for the town was $12,041. About 19.5% of families and 31.3% of the population were below the poverty line, including 28.6% of those under age 18 and 32.0% of those age 65 or over.

== Notable person ==
- Lionel Aldridge, football player with the Green Bay Packers, is an Evergreen native.
