= Avoyelles Parish, Louisiana =

Parish in Louisiana, United States

Avoyelles Parish
- Parish
- Avoyelles Parish; Paroisse des Avoyelles (French)
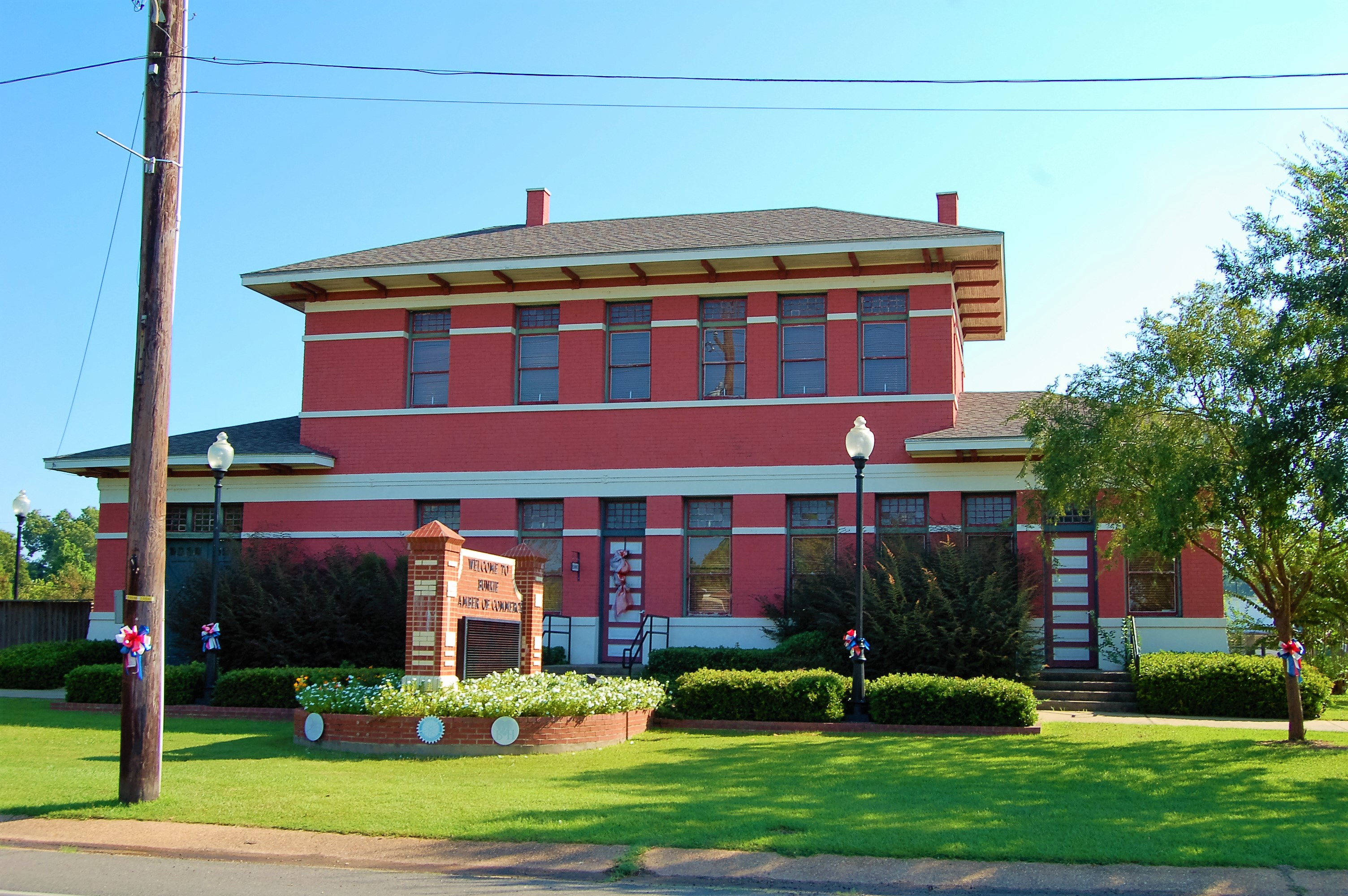
- Texas and Pacific Railroad Depot in Bunkie

- Flag Seal Logo

- Location within the U.S. state of Louisiana
- Coordinates: 31°04′N 92°00′W
- Country: United States
- State: Louisiana
- Founded: March 31, 1807
- Named for: Avoyel Native Americans
- Seat: Marksville
- Largest city: Marksville

Area
  - Total: 866 sq mi (2,240 km^{2})
  - Land: 832 sq mi (2,150 km^{2})
  - Water: 33 sq mi (85 km^{2}) 3.8%

Population (2020)
  - Total: 39,693
  - Estimate (2025): 37,941 ▼
  - Density: 47.7/sq mi (18.4/km^{2})
- Time zone: UTC−6 (Central)
  - Summer (DST): UTC−5 (CDT)
- Congressional district: 5th
- Website: www.avoypj.org

Avoyelles (French: Paroisse des Avoyelles) is a parish located in central eastern Louisiana on the Red River where it effectively becomes the Atchafalaya River and meets the Mississippi River. As of the 2020 census, the population was 39,693. The parish seat is Marksville. The parish was created in 1807, with the name deriving from the French name for the historic Avoyel people, one of the local Indian tribes at the time of European encounter.

Today the parish is the base of the federally recognized Tunica-Biloxi Indian Tribe, who have a reservation there. The tribe has a land-based gambling casino on their reservation. It is located in Marksville, the parish seat, which is partly within reservation land.

== History ==
Native Americans occupied this area beginning around 300 BC. Varying indigenous cultures flourished there in the following centuries. Today on the banks of the old Mississippi River channel in Marksville, three large burial mounds have been preserved from the Mississippian culture, which flourished especially along the upper Mississippi, the Ohio River and other tributaries, from about 900 AD to 1500 AD. Mounds of its major city, Cahokia, are preserved in western Illinois across the Mississippi from St. Louis, Missouri. The trading network reached from the Gulf Coast to the Great Lakes. A museum and a National Park commemorate this early culture.

The Tunica people had bands whose territory extended into the central Mississippi Valley. They absorbed the smaller remnant of Avoyel people nearly two centuries ago. Through the years, they also intermarried with the more numerous Biloxi people. The peoples organized politically in the 20th century and were federally recognized in 1981 as the Tunica-Biloxi Indian Tribe. They are the largest Native American tribe in Avoyelles Parish and have a reservation that extends into Marksville. Descendants of other smaller tribes are also enrolled in this tribe.

Avoyelles Parish is known for its French colonial history and tradition of French language use. The contemporary Creole traditions, in both music and food, reflect Native American, African and European influences. While Avoyelles has a distinctive history of European immigrants, highly influenced by the French in its early history, it is considered the most northern of the 22 "Acadiana" parishes. These have a tradition of settlement by French-speaking refugees from Acadia (now eastern Canada) in the late 18th century. They contributed strongly to the development of culture in this area, as did Africans and the indigenous Native Americans. The parish is noted for its brand of Cajun/Creole style music and its gumbo, a popular soup with roots in the three major ethnicities noted above.

The central part of Avoyelles Parish is sited on a large plateau, slightly above the floodplain of the waterways. Travel by water was long the primary way to move around this area. The Indians used canoes, and the early French settlers developed their own boats, known as pirogues.

Records from the Catholic churches in Mansura and Marksville document the founding of a trading post and a Catholic school by French colonists. The merchants wanted to conduct fur trading with the Tunica Tribe and the missionaries hoped to convert the natives to Christianity. The trading post was built near the Avoyel/Tunica settlement; it was preserved until the mid-1960s. Historic roadside markers on LA 1 identify the site of the historic Catholic mission school.

Franco-European settlers first called this area Hydropolis, meaning water city, referring to the marshes and bayous. The major mode of transportation was by Indian canoe and pirogue (a French-style dug-out canoe). Church records identify settlers with all their family members listed, as well as some property; in some cases they listed slaves by name. Church records and documentation were recorded in French during the years of initial settlement, then in Spanish during their brief rule in the late 18th century, with a return to French after France reacquired the area under Napoleon Bonaparte in the early 19th century.

After his troops failed to regain control over Saint-Domingue (now Haiti), Napoleon withdrew from North America. He sold the large Louisiana Purchase territory in 1803 to the United States under President Thomas Jefferson. As the US expanded its rule, local documents began to be recorded in the English of the new government. The United States arranged for the Lewis and Clark Expedition and others to survey the Louisiana Territory. It hired local French soldiers, surveyors and doctors, many of whom eventually settled in the area.

Many of the French people who settled Avoyelles Parish immigrated from France in the late 18th and early 19th centuries. Many of the French words commonly used today in the parish date to terms used during the Napoleon period in France, indicating that this was the period of immigration. They have not been used in France for many generations.

The Spanish influence in Louisiana was more dominant in New Iberia — this was named after colonists from the Iberian Peninsula, commonly known as Spain and Portugal. There are no Spanish surnames in Avoyelles. A few families from French Canada (Quebec) settled in Avoyelles. They were from a different geographic area of Canada than the Acadians of present-day Nova Scotia, who were expelled by the British from their homeland (Acadie) beginning in 1755 during the Seven Years' War with France. Many deported Acadians eventually made it to Louisiana from 1764 - 1788, after several years of living in exile along the eastern Atlantic seaboard, Canada, St. Pierre and France.

In the later 19th century, immigrants from Scotland, Belgium, Italy, and Germany also settled here, following the French Creoles. Together they established today's towns and villages. Their direct ties to Europe set them apart from the Acadians (Cajuns) of southern Louisiana, who came from a culture established for generations in Canada. At the turn of the 19th century, free people of color of African-French descent also settled in Avoyelles. Many came from New Orleans, which had a large community of free people of color. Others were refugees from Saint-Domingue, where slaves had rebelled to gain independence as the nation of Haiti. Others came from other colonies in the French West Indies.

The blending of these three cultures: Native American, European and African, created a distinct Louisiana Creole culture noted in the local language, food, Catholic religion, and family ties.

In the 21st century, the Avoyelles Parish culture has been classified as "Cajun" because of the perceived similarities in speech, food, and various folk traditions with the more southern Acadian parishes. But, few families in Avoyelles are of Acadian descent. From the 1800s until the mid-1900s, local Confederate units and local newspaper reports in The Villager always referred to the Avoyelles French families as Creoles, the term for native-born people of direct descent from early French colonists and born in the colony.

Following the disastrous Great Flood of 1927, the US Army Corps of Engineers built a system of levees along the Mississippi River. It reduced immediate flooding in Marksville and other towns, but has caused indirect damage to the wetlands. This has ultimately caused more serious flooding as the speed of the river has increased.

== Geography ==
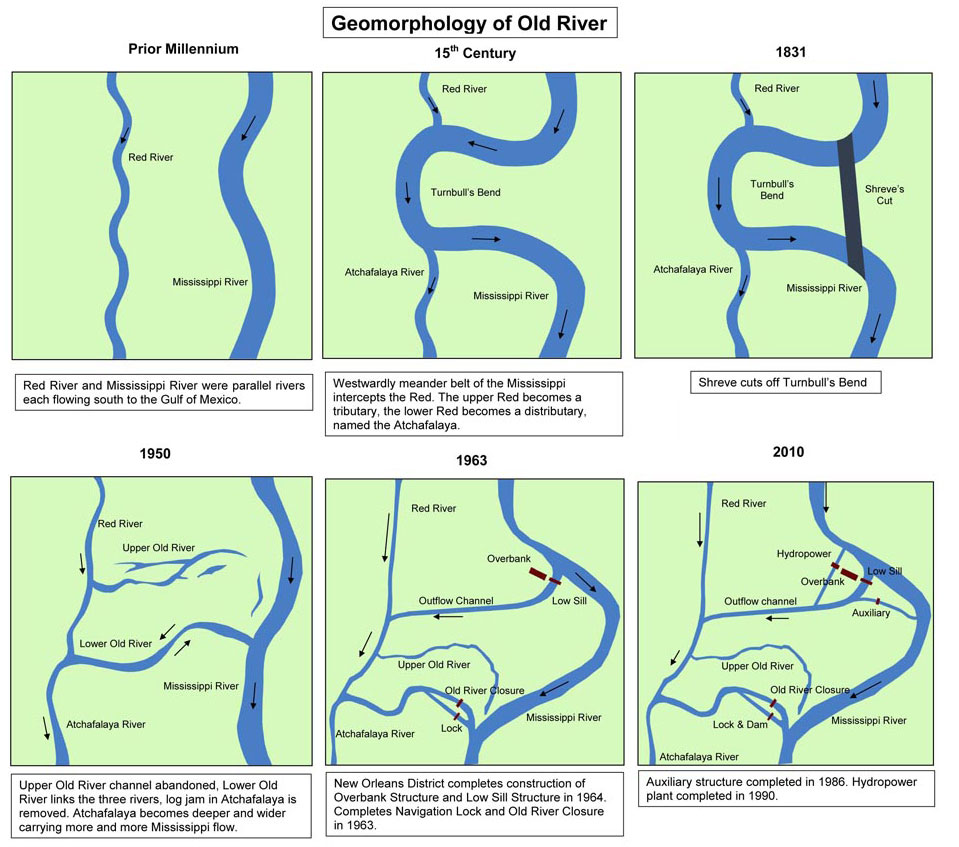
Formation of the Atchafalaya River and construction of the Old River Control Structure.

According to the U.S. Census Bureau, the parish has a total area of 866 square miles (2,240 km^{2}), of which 832 square miles (2,150 km^{2}) is land and 33 square miles (85 km^{2}) (3.8%) is water. The parish is bounded on the east by what was just the Red River in the first millennium CE, and is now the Red River and Atchafalaya River. The formation of the Atchafalaya River happened when the Mississippi River changed course, breaking up the Red River. In the 20th century the Old River Control Structure was built at this area to control the flow of the three rivers.

=== Major highways ===
- Interstate 49
- U.S. Highway 71
- Louisiana Highway 1
- Louisiana Highway 29
- Louisiana Highway 105
- Louisiana Highway 106
- Louisiana Highway 107
- Louisiana Highway 114
- Louisiana Highway 115
- Louisiana Highway 361
- Louisiana Highway 362
- Louisiana Highway 451
- Louisiana Highway 452
- Louisiana Highway 453
- Louisiana Highway 454
- Louisiana Highway 1175
- Louisiana Highway 1176
- Louisiana Highway 1177
- Louisiana Highway 1178
- Louisiana Highway 1189
- Louisiana Highway 1179
- Louisiana Highway 1180
- Louisiana Highway 1181
- Louisiana Highway 1182
- Louisiana Highway 1183
- Louisiana Highway 1185
- Louisiana Highway 1186
- Louisiana Highway 1187
- Louisiana Highway 1188
- Louisiana Highway 1189
- Louisiana Highway 1190
- Louisiana Highway 1191
- Louisiana Highway 1192
- Louisiana Highway 1193
- Louisiana Highway 1194
- Louisiana Highway 1195
- Louisiana Highway 1196
- Louisiana Highway 3041

=== Adjacent parishes ===
- La Salle Parish (north)
- Catahoula Parish (north)
- Concordia Parish (northeast)
- West Feliciana Parish (east)
- Pointe Coupee Parish (southeast)
- St. Landry Parish (south)
- Evangeline Parish (southwest)
- Rapides Parish (west)

=== National protected areas ===
- Grand Cote National Wildlife Refuge
- Lake Ophelia National Wildlife Refuge

=== The "Island" ===
During the Great Flood of 1927, the Mississippi River had reached high levels after torrential rainfall. The river had flooded vast amounts of land in Louisiana. Most flooding occurred in the region of Avoyelles. Avoyelles Parish was almost completely flooded, except for a small bit of land located in Fifth Ward. The "Island" as the locals began to call it, was along Island Rd, towards the end of present-day Louisiana Highway 1194, and near the Choctaw Bayou and Grand Cote NWR.

== Demographics ==
Historical population
Census	Pop.	Note	%±
1810	1,209		—
1820	2,245		85.7%
1830	3,484		55.2%
1840	6,616		89.9%
1850	9,326		41.0%
1860	13,167		41.2%
1870	12,926		−1.8%
1880	16,747		29.6%
1890	25,112		49.9%
1900	29,701		18.3%
1910	34,102		14.8%
1920	35,300		3.5%
1930	34,926		−1.1%
1940	39,256		12.4%
1950	38,031		−3.1%
1960	37,606		−1.1%
1970	37,751		0.4%
1980	41,393		9.6%
1990	39,159		−5.4%
2000	41,481		5.9%
2010	42,073		1.4%
2020	39,693		−5.7%
2025 (est.)	37,941	▼	−4.4%
U.S. Decennial Census; 1790–1960 1900–1990; 1990–2000 2010

=== 2020 census ===
Avoyelles Parish, Louisiana – Racial and ethnic composition Note: the US Census treats Hispanic/Latino as an ethnic category. This table excludes Latinos from the racial categories and assigns them to a separate category. Hispanics/Latinos may be of any race.
Race / Ethnicity (NH = Non-Hispanic)	Pop 1980	Pop 1990	Pop 2000	Pop 2010	Pop 2020	% 1980	% 1990	% 2000	% 2010	% 2020
White alone (NH)	30,318	27,893	28,147	27,877	25,236	73.24%	71.23%	67.86%	66.26%	63.58%
Black or African American alone (NH)	10,416	10,485	12,173	12,318	10,649	25.16%	26.78%	29.35%	29.28%	26.83%
Native American or Alaska Native alone (NH)	46	103	409	471	349	0.11%	0.26%	0.99%	1.12%	0.88%
Asian alone (NH)	18	44	71	140	345	0.04%	0.11%	0.17%	0.33%	0.87%
Native Hawaiian or Pacific Islander alone (NH)	x	x	1	3	3	x	x	0.00%	0.01%	0.01%
Other race alone (NH)	23	13	29	36	106	0.06%	0.03%	0.07%	0.09%	0.27%
Mixed race or Multiracial (NH)	x	x	247	622	1,520	x	x	0.60%	1.48%	3.83%
Hispanic or Latino (any race)	572	621	404	606	1,485	1.38%	1.59%	0.97%	1.44%	3.74%
Total	41,393	39,159	41,481	42,073	39,693	100.00%	100.00%	100.00%	100.00%	100.00%

At the 2020 United States census, there were 39,693 people, 15,163 households, and 9,840 families residing in the parish, up from 42,073 residents in 2010. At the census of 2000, there were 41,481 people, 14,736 households, and 10,580 families living in the parish. The population density was 50 people per square mile (19 people/km^{2}). There were 16,576 housing units at an average density of 20 per square mile (7.7/km^{2}).

In 2000, the racial makeup of the parish was 68.47% White, 29.49% Black or African American, 1.01% Native American, 0.17% Asian, 0.19% from other races, and 0.66% from two or more races. 0.97% of the population were Hispanic or Latino of any race. 17.64% reported speaking French or Cajun French at home, while 2.12% speak Spanish. In 2020, its racial makeup was 63.58% non-Hispanic white, 26.83% Black or African American, 0.88% Native American, 0.87% Asian, 0.01% Pacific Islander, 4.1% multiracial, and 3.74% Hispanic or Latino American.

In 2000, there were 14,736 households, out of which 36.30% had children under the age of 18 living with them, 51.70% were married couples living together, 15.70% had a female householder with no husband present, and 28.20% were non-families. 25.00% of all households were made up of individuals, and 11.90% had someone living alone who was 65 years of age or older. The average household size was 2.60 and the average family size was 3.11.

In the parish the population was spread out, with 26.80% under the age of 18, 9.20% from 18 to 24, 29.00% from 25 to 44, 21.30% from 45 to 64, and 13.70% who were 65 years of age or older. The median age was 35 years. For every 100 females there were 96.40 males. For every 100 females age 18 and over, there were 93.90 males.

The median income for a household in the parish was $23,851, and the median income for a family was $29,389. Males had a median income of $27,122 versus $18,250 for females. The per capita income for the parish was $12,146. About 21.70% of families and 25.90% of the population were below the poverty line, including 32.50% of those under age 18 and 25.00% of those age 65 or over.

== Education ==
All primary public schools are run by the Avoyelles Parish School Board. It operates 10 schools with an enrollment over 6,000 students. The school board website is Avoyelles Parish School Board.

=== Elementary ===
- Cottonport Elementary (Grades PK-6) (Cottonport)
- Bunkie Elementary (Grades PK-6) (Bunkie)
- Lafargue Elementary (Grades PK-6) (Effie)
- Marksville Elementary (Grades PK-6) (Marksville)
- Plaucheville Elementary (Grades PK-6) (Plaucheville)
- Riverside Elementary (Grades PK-6) (Simmesport)
- Sacred Heart School (Grades PK-8) Moreauville
- St. Anthony of Padua School (Grades PK-8) Bunkie
- St. Joseph School (Grades PK-12) Plaucheville
- St. Mary of the Assumption School (Grades PK-8) Cottonport
- Nazarene Christian Academy (Grades K-12) Marksville

=== High school ===
- Avoyelles High School (Grades 7-12) (Moreauville)
- Avoyelles Public Charter School (Grades PK-12) (Mansura)
- Bunkie High School (Grades 7-12) (Bunkie)
- LASAS (Louisiana School for the Agricultural Sciences) (Grades 7-12) (Bunkie)
- Marksville High School (Grades 7-12) (Marksville)
- St. Joseph's High School of Plaucheville (Grades PK-12) (Plaucheville)
- Nazarene Christian Academy (Grades PK-12) (Marksville)

== National Guard ==
The 1020th Engineer Company (Vertical) of the 527th Engineer Battalion of the 225th Engineer Brigade is located in Marksville, Louisiana. The 1086TH Transportation Company of the 165TH CSS (Combat Service Support) Battalion of the 139TH RSG (Regional Support Group) resides in Bunkie, Louisiana.

== Communities ==
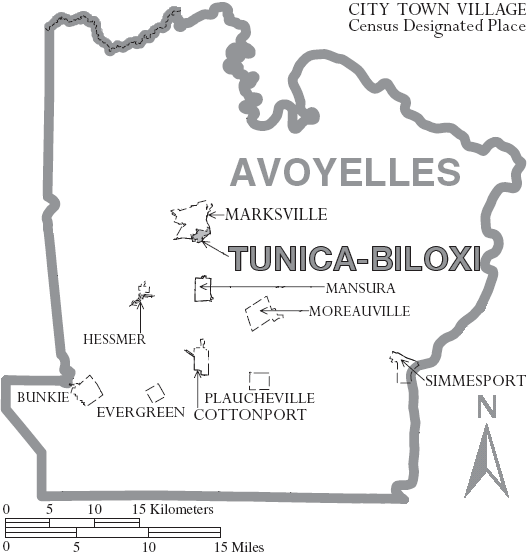
Map of Avoyelles Parish with municipal labels

=== Cities ===
- Bunkie
- Marksville (parish seat and largest municipality)

=== Towns ===
- Cottonport
- Evergreen
- Mansura
- Simmesport

=== Villages ===
- Hessmer
- Moreauville
- Plaucheville

=== DMA ===
- Alexandria LA DMA

=== Unincorporated areas ===
==== Census-designated places ====
- Bordelonville
- Center Point
- Fifth Ward

==== Other communities ====
- Belle d'Eau
- Belleville
- Big Bend
- Bodoc
- Brouillette
- Cassandra
- Dupont
- Effie
- Eola
- Hamburg
- Long Bridge
- Moncla
- North Point
- Odenburg
- Oklahoma
- Rexmere
- Vick
- Whitehall
- Yellow Bayou

== Notable people ==
Artists, authors and entertainers:

- Sue Eakin, historian, author of Avoyelles Parish: Crossroads of Louisiana
- Alcide "Blind Uncle" Gaspard, early recording artist of traditional Cajun music.
- Little Walter, Marion Walter Jacobs. musician and harmonica player, elected to the Rock and Roll Hall of Fame.
- Ruth McEnery Stuart, Marksville
- Solomon Northup, a free man from Saratoga Springs, New York, was held for nearly 12 years as a slave in Avoyelles Parish after being kidnapped and sold before the American Civil War; he was freed in 1853 by New York and Marksville officials after being traced here. Published his memoir, Twelve Years a Slave (1854), which became a best-selling book. It was adapted as a 2013 film of the same name, which won Academy Awards.

Athletes:

- Mark Duper, Moreauville Miami Dolphins wide receiver
- Allen Barbre, an American football offensive tackle who plays for the Denver Broncos.

Other:

- John Baptist Lafargue (1864–?), American educator, newspaper publisher, editor
- Norma McCorvey, "Jane Roe" in the landmark Roe v. Wade (1972) decision, in which the US Supreme Court ruled that women had a right to determine whether they would have an abortion.
- Felix Eugene Moncla Jr., United States Air Force pilot who disappeared over Lake Superior in 1953.

Political leaders:

- Bill Callegari, Republican former member of the Texas House of Representatives from Harris County; engineer and businessman in Katy, Texas, born in Cottonport in 1941
- Edwin Washington Edwards, four-term governor of Louisiana.
- Elaine Schwartzenburg Edwards, first wife of Edwin Edwards and appointed as U.S. Senator, serving August–November 1972
- Harvey Fields, born in Avoyelles Parish, state senator for Union and Morehouse parishes from 1916 to 1920; member of the Louisiana Public Service Commission from 1927 to 1936; former law partner and political ally of Huey Pierce Long Jr.
- Donald E. Hines, physician in Bunkie, politician and president of the Louisiana State Senate from 2004 to 2008
- Jeannette Theriot Knoll, associate justice of the Louisiana Supreme Court, retired 2016, a resident of Marksville
- Tucker L. Melancon, Bunkie, Senior United States District Judge.
- Charles Addison Riddle III, District Attorney, 2003–current, former state representative, 1992–2003.
- Earl Barbry, chairman of the Tunica-Biloxi Tribe.
- Horace Pierite Sr., chief of the Tunica-Biloxi tribe
- Sesostrie Youchigant, chief of the Tunica-Biloxi tribe and last fluent Tunic language speaker

== Politics ==
United States presidential election results for Avoyelles Parish, Louisiana
Year	Republican		Democratic		Third party(ies)	
Year	No.	%	No.	%	No.	%
1912	38	3.34%	949	83.32%	152	13.35%
1916	44	3.36%	1,253	95.72%	12	0.92%
1920	724	33.74%	1,422	66.26%	0	0.00%
1924	314	23.72%	1,010	76.28%	0	0.00%
1928	419	12.64%	2,896	87.36%	0	0.00%
1932	130	3.97%	3,148	96.03%	0	0.00%
1936	452	9.30%	4,408	90.70%	0	0.00%
1940	183	3.61%	4,883	96.39%	0	0.00%
1944	306	7.47%	3,789	92.53%	0	0.00%
1948	285	4.01%	1,356	19.09%	5,464	76.90%
1952	2,479	36.01%	4,405	63.99%	0	0.00%
1956	3,255	44.47%	3,628	49.57%	436	5.96%
1960	1,270	12.66%	7,625	75.98%	1,140	11.36%
1964	4,874	48.86%	5,102	51.14%	0	0.00%
1968	2,459	20.17%	2,973	24.38%	6,760	55.45%
1972	6,225	57.76%	3,395	31.50%	1,158	10.74%
1976	4,574	34.35%	8,104	60.86%	637	4.78%
1980	8,216	51.12%	7,174	44.64%	681	4.24%
1984	9,402	56.39%	6,808	40.83%	463	2.78%
1988	7,659	49.10%	7,353	47.13%	588	3.77%
1992	4,851	29.31%	8,696	52.55%	3,002	18.14%
1996	4,433	27.01%	9,689	59.04%	2,288	13.94%
2000	7,329	50.02%	6,701	45.73%	623	4.25%
2004	8,302	53.48%	6,976	44.93%	247	1.59%
2008	10,236	60.43%	6,327	37.35%	375	2.21%
2012	10,670	62.65%	6,077	35.68%	285	1.67%
2016	11,165	67.32%	5,035	30.36%	386	2.33%
2020	12,028	69.56%	4,979	28.79%	285	1.65%
2024	11,379	70.95%	4,460	27.81%	198	1.23%

== See also ==
- National Register of Historic Places listings in Avoyelles Parish, Louisiana
- Ray's Ferry
- Tunica-Biloxi
