= Avoyelles Parish School Board =

School district in Louisiana, United States

Address
- 221 Tunica Drive W. Marksville, Louisiana, 71351
- Coordinates: 31.1252°N 92.07259°W

District information
- Grades: Pre-K through 12
- President: Darrell Wiley
- Vice-president: John Gagnard
- Superintendent: Blaine Dauzat
- School board: 9 members
- Schools: 10 schools; 6 Elementary; 4 High
- NCES District ID: 2200150

Other information
- Website: www.avoyellespsb.com

Avoyelles Parish School Board is a school district headquartered in Marksville, Louisiana, United States. The district serves Avoyelles Parish in south central Louisiana.

Former Louisiana State Senate President Donald E. Hines, M.D., was a member of the Avoyelles School Board from 1972 to 1993.

== School uniforms ==
Students are required to wear school uniforms.

== Schools ==
=== High schools ===
Zoned

- Avoyelles High School (Moreauville)
- Bunkie High School (Bunkie)
- Marksville High School (Marksville)

Magnet

- Louisiana School for the Agricultural Sciences (Unincorporated area)

=== Elementary schools ===
- Bunkie Elementary School (Bunkie)
- Cottonport Elementary School (Cottonport)
- Lafargue Elementary School (Unincorporated area)
- Marksville Elementary School (Marksville)
- Plaucheville Elementary School (Unincorporated area)
- Riverside Elementary School (Simmesport)
