= U.S. Route 11 =

Numbered U.S. Highway in the Southeastern and Northeastern United States

U.S. Route 11
- US 11 in red, US 11E in blue, and US 11W in magenta

Route information
- Length: 1,645 mi (2,647 km)
- Existed: November 11, 1926–present

Major junctions
- South end: US 90 in New Orleans, LA
- I-10 in New Orleans, LA; I-20 / I-59 in Meridian, MS; I-20 / I-59 / I-65 in Birmingham, AL; I-24 / I-75 in Chattanooga, TN; I-40 / I-75 in Knoxville, TN; I-81 at various locations; US 19 / US 58 in Abingdon, VA; I-77 / I-81 / US 52 in Wytheville, VA; I-64 near Staunton, VA; I-76 near Carlisle, PA; I-80 near Bloomsburg, PA; I-87 / US 9 near Champlain, NY
- North end: R-223 at the Canadian border in Rouses Point, NY

Location
- Country: United States
- States: Louisiana, Mississippi, Alabama, Georgia, Tennessee, Virginia, West Virginia, Maryland, Pennsylvania, New York

Highway system
- United States Numbered Highway System; List; Special; Divided
← US 10	→ US 12

U.S. Route 11 or U.S. Highway 11 (US 11) is a major north–south U.S. Highway extending 1,645 miles (2,647 km) across the Eastern United States. The southern terminus of the route is at US 90 in Bayou Sauvage National Wildlife Refuge in eastern New Orleans, Louisiana. The northern terminus is at the Rouses Point–Lacolle 223 Border Crossing in Rouses Point, New York. The route continues across the border into Canada as Route 223. US 11, created in 1926, maintains most of its original route. Much of US 11’s corridor in the Shenandoah Valley of Virginia follows the historic Valley Pike, which in turn developed from a Native American travel route later called the Great Warrior Path and the Great Wagon Road. While it is signed as a north–south route, it physically travels in a northeast–southwest direction.

Until 1929, US 11 ended just south of Picayune, Mississippi, at the Pearl River border with Louisiana. It was extended through Louisiana after that.

The Maestri Bridge, which carries US 11 across Lake Pontchartrain, served as the only route to New Orleans from the east for six weeks after Hurricane Katrina due to its sturdy construction. The storm virtually destroyed the I-10 Twin Span Bridge and damaged the Fort Pike Bridge on US 90.

Interstate 81 (I-81), constructed in the 1960s, parallels the route of US 11 in many areas. Beyond I-81's southern terminus, other Interstates run along corridors paralleling US 11, specifically I-59, which is joined to I-81 by I-40, I-75, and I-24.

== Route description ==
Lengths
	mi	km
LA	31	50
MS	173	278
AL	251	404
GA	23	37
TN	234	377 (Note: via US 11W)
VA	341	549
WV	26	42
MD	13	21
PA	248	399
NY	319	513
Total	1,645	2,647

=== Louisiana ===
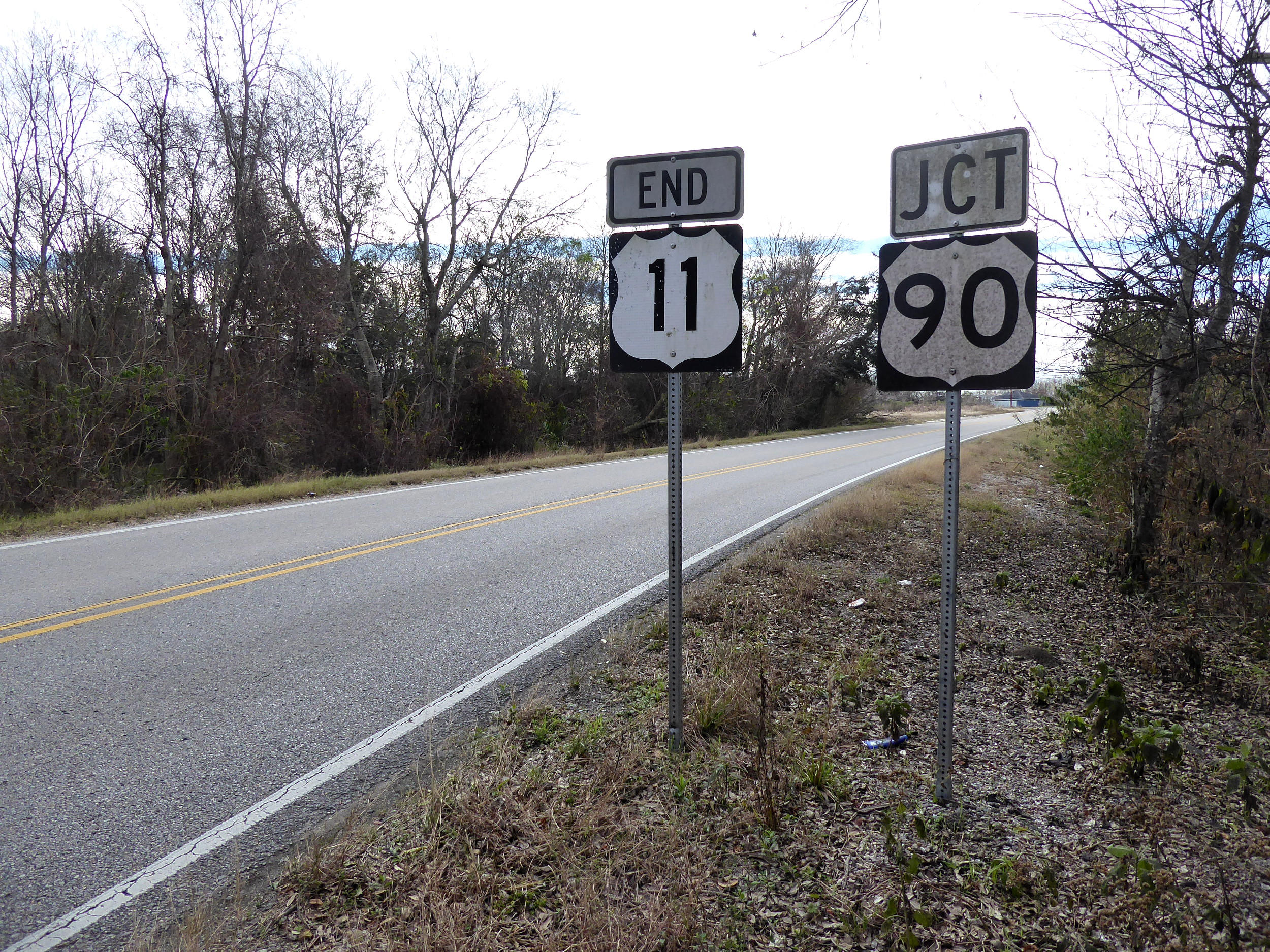
Southern terminus at US 90 in New Orleans, Louisiana

US 11 spans 31.2 miles (50.2 km) within the state of Louisiana. Its southern terminus is located in New Orleans East at a junction with US 90 (Chef Menteur Highway). The route begins as a two-lane highway that travels northward through a remote stretch of marshland within both the Bayou Sauvage National Wildlife Refuge and the New Orleans city limits. After crossing over I-10 at exit 254, US 11 proceeds across Lake Pontchartrain on the Maestri Bridge, a 4.8-mile-long (7.7 km) span dating from 1928 that parallels the I-10 Twin Span Bridge. Midway across the lake, US 11 enters unincorporated St. Tammany Parish. Upon reaching the north shore, US 11 follows Pontchartrain Drive into the city of Slidell, where it becomes a busy four-lane commercial corridor.

After a brief concurrency with Louisiana Highway 433 (LA 433), US 11 turns onto Front Street and travels alongside the Norfolk Southern Railway (NS) line through Slidell's historic district. During this stretch, the route intersects both US 190 Business (Fremaux Avenue) and mainline US 190 (Gause Boulevard), both four-lane thoroughfares connecting with nearby I-10. Returning to two-lane capacity, US 11 crosses to the west side of the NS line on a narrow overpass built in 1937. At the north end of the city, US 11 intersects I-12 at exit 83, which is located just west of a major interchange with I-10 and I-59.

A few miles later, US 11 enters the town of Pearl River and intersects LA 41 (Watts Road). Here, the route turns southeast onto Concord Boulevard and proceeds a short distance to exit 3 on I-59. US 11 turns north onto I-59 and utilizes the four-lane Interstate alignment for the remainder of its distance in Louisiana. Following a second interchange serving the small town, I-59 and US 11 cross the West Pearl River into the dense Honey Island Swamp. Along this stretch is an exit connecting to Old US 11, a remnant of the pre-Interstate alignment that provides access to Pearl River Wildlife Management Area. US 11 crosses into the state of Mississippi with I-59 on a bridge spanning the main branch of the Pearl River just south of Nicholson, Mississippi.

=== Mississippi ===
US 11 runs for approximately 173 miles (278 km) in Mississippi. It enters the state along I-59, passing through several groves of trees. After a short distance, US 11 and I-59 interchange at exit 1 with Mississippi Highway 607 (MS 607), where MS 607 ends and US 11 takes over its northeastern alignment away from I-59. US 11 generally parallels I-59 across Mississippi, serving as a local business route and following city streets through communities such as Hattiesburg, Laurel, and Meridian, where I-59 begins a concurrency with I-20 eastbound. It leaves the state east of Meridian concurrent with US 80, entering the state of Alabama.

=== Alabama ===
US 11 spans 250.671 miles (403.416 km) in Alabama. It and US 80 split three miles (4.8 km) into Alabama near Cuba, with US 80 following an eastward track toward Demopolis. US 11, in contrast, continues to parallel the I-20/I-59 freeway through Livingston to Eutaw, where US 11 joins US 43. The overlapping routes proceed northeast to Tuscaloosa, where US 43 splits from US 11 and heads north. US 11, however, continues along the I-20/I-59 corridor to Birmingham. US 11 overlaps I-20/59 for approximately 12 miles (19 km) between Woodstock and Bessemer. From Bessemer into Birmingham, the route is locally known as the "Bessemer Superhighway". US 11 is cosigned with State Route 5 (SR 5) between Woodstock and Birmingham. US 11 through the western side of Birmingham is known as the Bessemer Superhighway and 3rd Avenue West. It passes near the Alabama State Fairgrounds, Rickwood Field (one of the oldest baseball stadiums in the U.S.), and Legion Field (known for hosting football games). On the east side of Birmingham, US 11 is known locally as 1st Avenue North and as Roebuck Parkway.

West of downtown Birmingham, US 11 intersects US 78. US 78 turns east onto US 11, forming an overlap as the roadway enters the heart of the city. In the midst of the city center, US 78 breaks from US 11, progressing south of US 11 as the two routes exit the city. East of downtown, I-20 splits from I-59, with US 11 following I-59 to the northeast. US 11 passes through Gadsden and Fort Payne before crossing into Georgia 10 miles (16 km) northeast of Hammondville.

Throughout Alabama, US 11 is paired with unsigned State Route 7 (SR 7).

Until 1955, US 11 was routed to Ashville and Gadsden following the current routes of SR 23 and US 411 and followed Third Street and went west on Forrest Avenue in downtown Gadsden. It was relocated to its present route to Attalla, with the original route designated as an alternate route until 1963.

The routes that corresponds to US 11's route in Alabama includes the Bear Meat Cabin Road (Huntsville Road), the Rome and Tuscaloosa Road (also called "Georgia Road") from Birmingham, and the Chattanooga Road (also called Alabama Road) from Attalla.

=== Georgia ===
After entering the state from Alabama, US 11 and State Route 58 (SR 58) travel northeast, parallel to I-59, through the valley between Sand and Lookout mountains. The routes travel through the county seat of Dade County, Trenton, where they are briefly concurrent with SR 136. In the community of Wildwood, US 11 and SR 58 intersect the eastern terminus of SR 299 before continuing north into Tennessee. US 11 extends 23 miles (37 km) within the state's borders.

US 11 and SR 58 see an annual average daily traffic (AADT) of 5,000 vehicles or more north of Trenton. However, most of the route's through traffic has been diverted to I-59, which closely parallels the route not only in Georgia but also in Alabama and Mississippi.

=== Tennessee ===
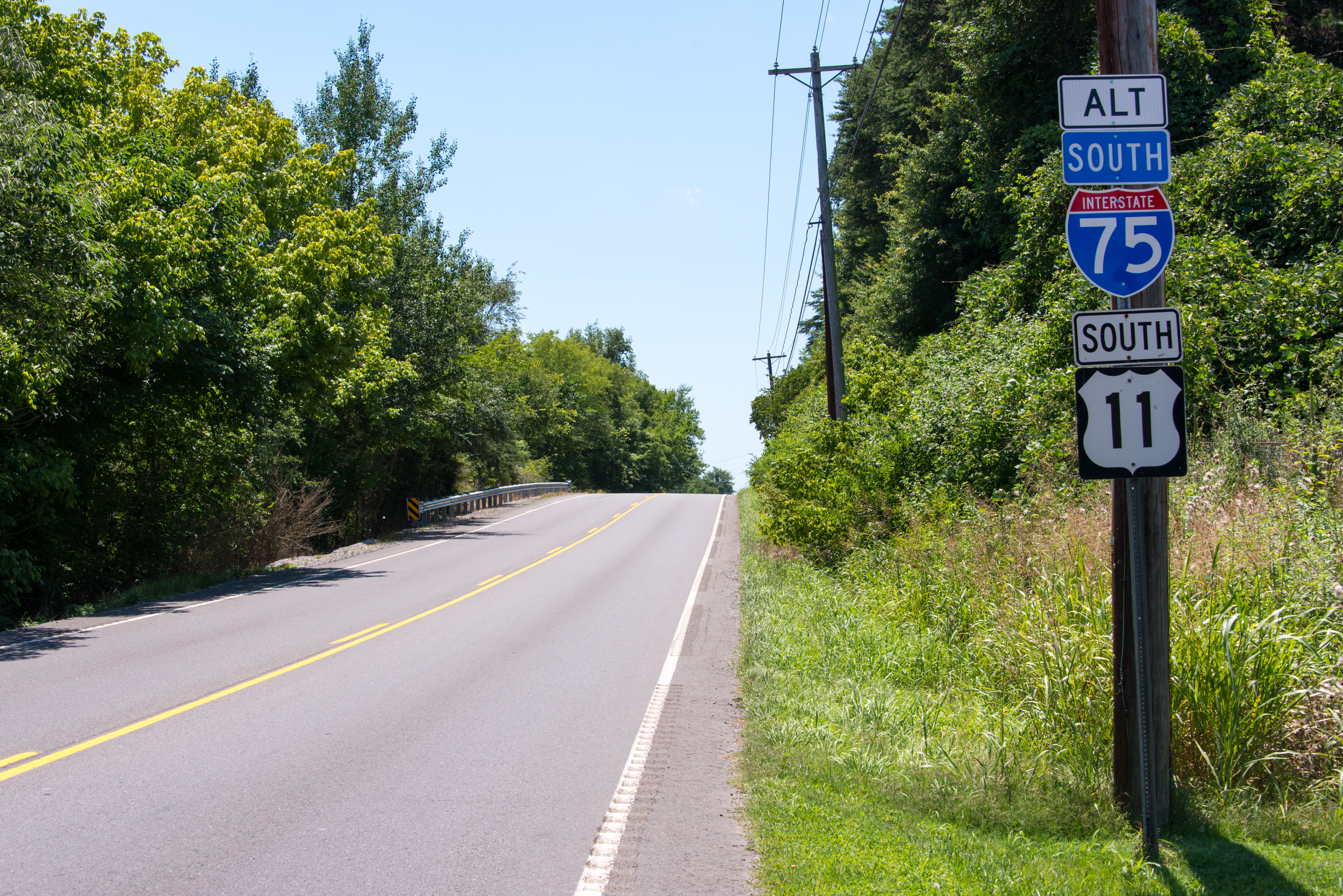
US 11 along Lee Highway, south of Lenoir City, Tennessee

US 11 enters Tennessee west of Chattanooga. The route, concurrent with State Route 38 (SR 38) from the state line north, runs parallel to I-24 for three miles (4.8 km) to an intersection with Cummings Highway (US 41/US 64/US 72/SR 2). While SR 38 terminates here, US 11 follows the highway east into downtown Chattanooga. At the intersection of Broad Street and East 23rd Street, US 11 and US 64 separate from US 41 and US 72 and follow East 23rd east through downtown. The routes briefly overlap with US 41, here concurrent to US 76, on Dodds Avenue before resuming an easterly progression on Brainerd Road thereafter called Lee Highway. The road is also called Lee Highway in southwestern Virginia.

East of downtown, I-24 terminates while I-75 continues east along the I-24 right-of-way. US 11 and US 64 continue to the northeast, paralleling I-75 to Cleveland. In Downtown Cleveland, US 64 separates from US 11, following US 74 east out of the city.

US 11 remains close to I-75 as it heads north, passing through Athens, Sweetwater, Loudon, and Lenoir City before entering Farragut. On the western edge of town, US 11 merges with US 70 at Dixie Lee Junction to form Kingston Pike. The routes remain joined for just over 20 miles (32 km) as they pass through Farragut and West Knoxville before diverging again in Downtown Knoxville.

In East Knoxville, US 11 splits into US 11W and US 11E, with US 70 following US 11E.

=== U.S. Route 11E ===
Traversing 120.9 miles (194.6 km) from Knoxville, Tennessee, to Bristol, Virginia, US 11E connects the cities and towns of New Market, Jefferson City, Morristown, Greeneville, Tusculum, Jonesborough, Johnson City, Bluff City, and Bristol, all in Tennessee. After crossing into Virginia, it reconnects with US 11W.

=== U.S. Route 11W ===
Traversing 111.2 miles (179.0 km) from Knoxville, Tennessee, to Bristol, Virginia, US 11W connects the cities and towns of Blaine, Rutledge, Bean Station, Rogersville, Surgoinsville, Church Hill, Mount Carmel, and Kingsport, all in Tennessee. After crossing into Virginia, it reconnects with US 11E.

=== Virginia ===
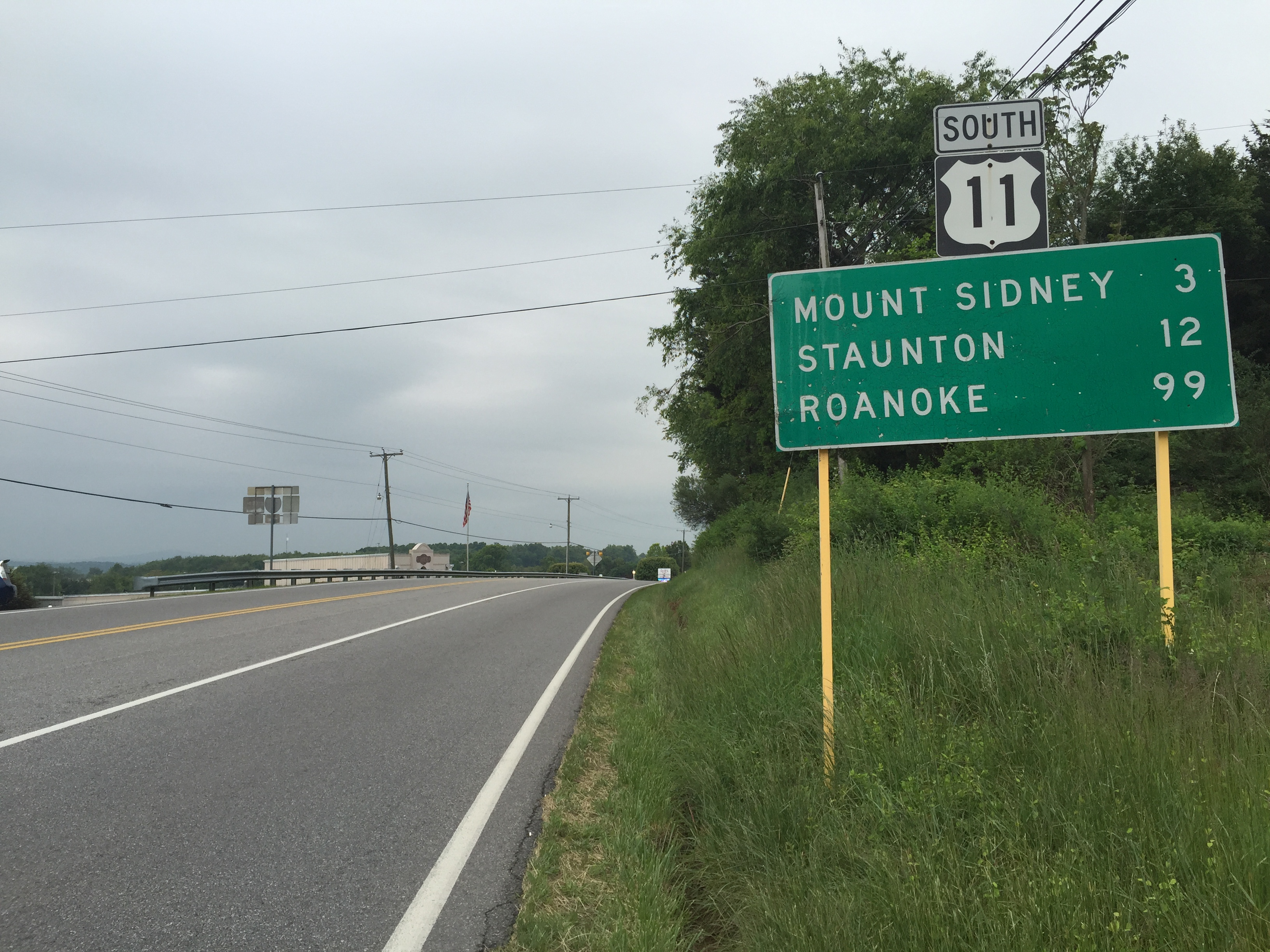
View south along US 11 near SR 256 in Weyers Cave, Augusta County, Virginia

US 11W and US 11E rejoin as US 11 in Bristol less than a mile north of the Tennessee–Virginia state line. As Lee Highway, US 11 proceeds northeastward through Abingdon, Wytheville, and Radford. In this area, I-81 was constructed parallel to US 11.

At Christiansburg, US 11 joins US 460 and the two routes overlap for 28 miles (45 km) to Salem, where the two highways split. US 11 winds through Roanoke on several roads, sometimes opposite the signed direction.

Part of the Carolina Road, a colonial trail, follows the roadbed of US 11, also known as the Lee Highway, through Virginia. Near Cloverdale is the historical marker: "This is the old road from Pennsylvania to the Yadkin Valley, over which in early times settlers passed going south. On it were the Black Horse Tavern and the Tinker Creek Presbyterian Church."

From Roanoke, the highway continues through Buchanan, Lexington, Staunton, Harrisonburg, and Winchester in the Shenandoah Valley. (Between Buchanan and Lexington, US 11 passes over famed Natural Bridge). I-81 was constructed parallel to US 11 through many of these cities, although it generally bypassed the smaller towns. US 11 enters West Virginia about 10 miles (16 km) northeast of Winchester. Through the Great Appalachian Valley, US 11 follows much of former Valley Pike, a former colonial trace and important roadway during the Civil War.

=== West Virginia ===
US 11 enters West Virginia less than 200 yards (180 m) southeast of I-81. US 11 heads northeast for about 35 miles (56 km) through Berkeley County, passing through Inwood, Martinsburg, and Falling Waters before crossing the Potomac River into Maryland. The road is known as Winchester Avenue south of Martinsburg and as Williamsport Pike north of the city.

=== Maryland ===
In Maryland, US 11 passes over the Potomac River into Williamsport and through Hagerstown in Washington County before crossing the Mason–Dixon line into Pennsylvania. I-81 was constructed along much the same route in the 1960s.

=== Pennsylvania ===
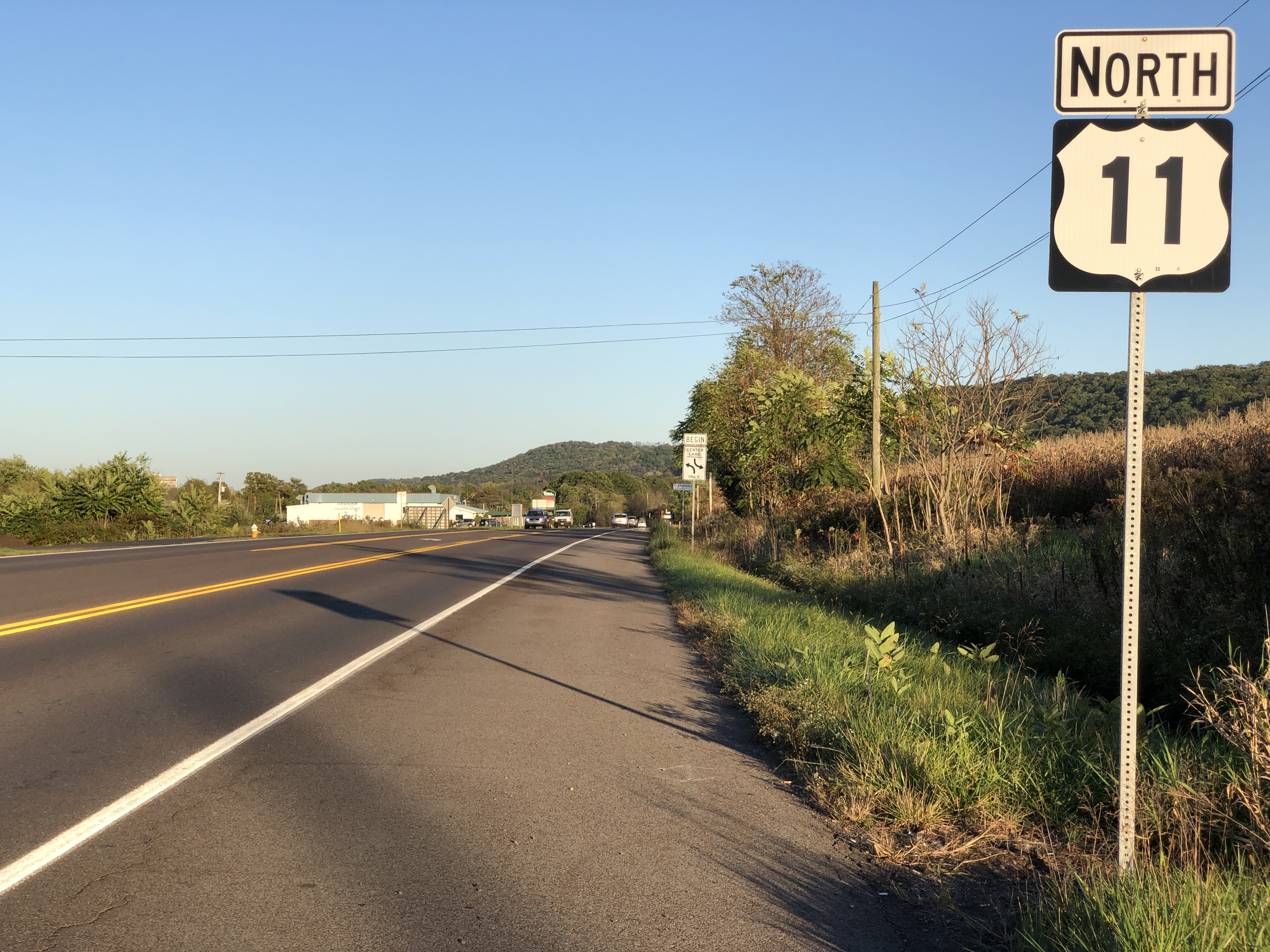
US 11 northbound in Danville, Pennsylvania

US 11 and I-81 enter Pennsylvania south of Greencastle. Known as the Molly Pitcher highway, US 11 follows I-81 northeast through the Cumberland Valley, running parallel to each other as they pass through Chambersburg, Shippensburg, and Carlisle. Northeast of Carlisle in Middlesex Township, US 11 interchanges with the Pennsylvania Turnpike (I-76) and I-81 in succession. US 11, now to the south of I-81, continues eastward into the western suburbs of Harrisburg as the Carlisle Pike.

In Camp Hill, a close suburb of Harrisburg, US 11 stops paralleling I-81 and joins US 15 northward through the western suburbs of Harrisburg. As the road exits the Harrisburg area, US 11 and US 15 begin to parallel the Susquehanna River as both head northward. The two routes remain overlapped to an intersection in Shamokin Dam, where US 15 branches off to the northwest, following the path of the West Branch Susquehanna River northward. US 11, in contrast, continues to parallel the main Susquehanna River, passing through municipalities such as Danville, Bloomsburg, and Berwick prior to reaching Wilkes-Barre.

In Wilkes-Barre, US 11 breaks from the Susquehanna and begins to run parallel to I-81 once more. From Wilkes-Barre, the highway goes through nearby Scranton, becoming the North Scranton Expressway north of downtown. In Clarks Summit, just north of Scranton, US 11 intersects US 6. US 6 joins US 11 westward to Factoryville, where US 11 separates from US 6 and resumes its northerly trek through Susquehanna County to the New York–Pennsylvania border.

=== New York ===
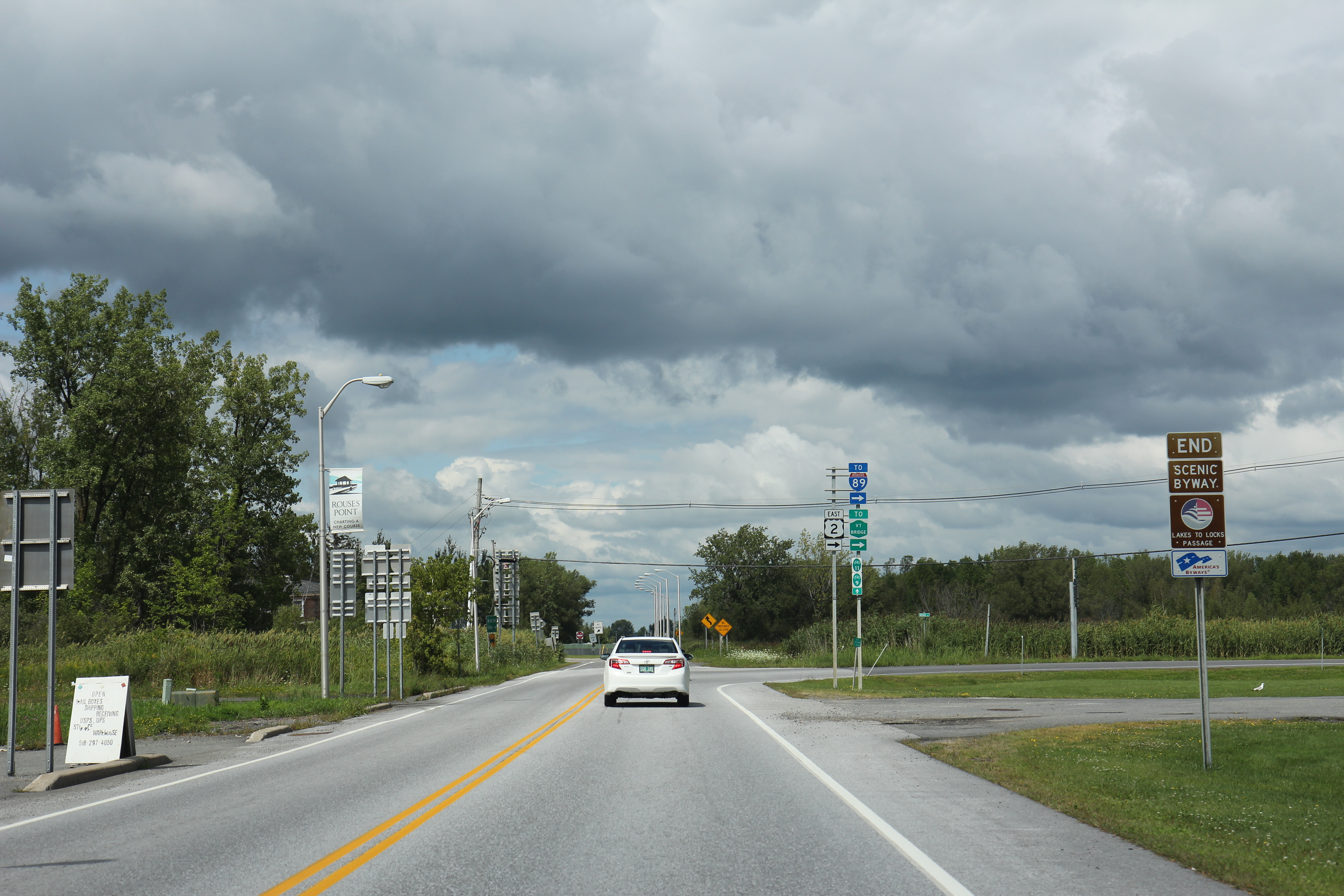
Northern terminus

US 11 proceeds northwestward through New York from the Pennsylvania border to Binghamton. US 11 and I-81 continue to parallel each other as they head north through Cortland and Syracuse. The route continues northward to Watertown. US 11 heads northeast from Watertown, passing along the northern edge of Fort Drum and traversing a number of towns and villages, including Canton and Potsdam. US 11 passes north of the Adirondack Park passing through Malone. At Rouses Point, US 11 joins New York State Route 9B and heads north to the Rouses Point–Lacolle 223 Border Crossing, becoming Route 223.

== History ==
In Virginia's Shenandoah Valley, US 11 follows much of the historic Valley Pike corridor, previously known as the Great Wagon Road, and before that as the Great Warrior Path. After the 1744 Treaty of Lancaster, a marked route up the valley was laid out in 1745 by James Patton and John Buchanan.

== Junction list ==
Southern segment

Louisiana
US 90 in New Orleans
I-10 in New Orleans
US 190 in Slidell
I-12 in Slidell
I-59 in Pearl River. The highways travel concurrently to Nicholson, Mississippi.
Mississippi
I-59 / US 98 in Hattiesburg
US 49 in Hattiesburg
I-59 in Walters
I-59 in Laurel
I-59 northeast of Laurel
I-20 / I-59 / US 80 in Meridian. I-20/I-59/US 11 travel concurrently through the city. US 11/US 80 travel concurrently to Cuba, Alabama.
I-20 / I-59 east-northeast of Toomsuba
Alabama
US 43 in Eutaw. The highways travel concurrently to Tuscaloosa.
I-20 / I-59 in Knoxville
I-359 / US 43 in Tuscaloosa. I-359/US 11 travel concurrently through the city.
I-20 / I-59 / I-359 in Tuscaloosa
US 82 in Tuscaloosa
I-20 / I-59 in Tuscaloosa
I-20 / I-59 in Tuscaloosa
I-20 / I-59 south of Lake View. The highways travel concurrently to Bessemer.
I-459 southwest of McCalla
US 78 in Birmingham. The highways travel concurrently through the city.
I-65 in Birmingham
US 31 / US 280 in Birmingham
I-20 in Birmingham
I-59 in Birmingham
I-459 in Birmingham
US 231 in Ashville
US 278 / US 431 in Attalla. The highways travel concurrently through the city.
I-59 in Fort Payne
Georgia
No major intersections
Tennessee
US 41 / US 64 / US 72 in Chattanooga. US 11/US 41/US 72 travel concurrently through the city. US 11/US 64 travel concurrently to Cleveland.
US 27 in Chattanooga
US 41 / US 76 in Chattanooga. The highways travel concurrently through the city.
I-75 in Chattanooga. The highways travel concurrently through the city.
US 321 in Lenoir City
US 70 southwest of Farragut. The highways travel concurrently to Knoxville.
I-140 in Knoxville
I-40 / I-75 in Knoxville
US 129 in Knoxville
US 441 in Knoxville. The highways travel concurrently through the city.
I-40 / I-275 in Knoxville
US 11E / US 11W / US 70 in Knoxville

Northern segment

Virginia
US 11E / US 11W / US 19 / US 421 in Bristol. US 11/US 19 travel concurrently to Abingdon.
I-81 / US 58 in Bristol
I-81 / US 58 northeast of Bristol
I-81 / US 58 east of Abingdon. US 11/US 58 travel concurrently for approximately 0.3 miles (0.48 km).
I-81 southeast of Glade Spring
I-81 in Seven Mile Ford
I-81 southwest of Marion
I-81 northeast of Marion
I-81 west of Wytheville
US 21 in Wytheville. The highways travel concurrently through the city.
I-77 / I-81 / US 52 in Wytheville. I-77/US 11/US 52 travel concurrently to Fort Chiswell. I-81/US 11 travel concurrently to south of Pulaski.
US 460 in Christiansburg
I-81 / US 460 in Christiansburg. US 11/US 460 travel concurrently to Salem.
US 221 in Roanoke. The highways travel concurrently through the city.
Future I-73 / I-581 / US 220 in Roanoke
US 221 / US 460 in Roanoke
I-81 southwest of Buchanan
I-81 northeast of Buchanan. The highways travel concurrently to west of Natural Bridge.
I-81 northeast of Natural Bridge
US 60 in Lexington
I-64 in East Lexington
I-64 / I-81 northeast of East Lexington
US 340 in Greenville
I-64 / I-81 in Greenville
US 250 in Staunton. The highways travel concurrently through the city.
I-81 in Harrisonburg
US 33 in Harrisonburg
I-81 northeast of Harrisonburg
I-81 in Mauzy
US 211 in New Market
I-81 in Strasburg
US 17 / US 50 / US 522 in Winchester. The highways travel concurrently through the city.
I-81 northeast of Winchester
West Virginia
I-81 north-northeast of Falling Waters
Maryland
I-81 in Halfway
US 40 in Hagerstown
Pennsylvania
I-81 in Antrim Township
US 30 in Chambersburg
I-76 in Middlesex Township
I-81 in Middlesex Township
US 15 in Camp Hill. The highways travel concurrently to Shamokin Dam.
I-81 in Summerdale
US 22 / US 322 in Penn Township
US 522 in Monroe Township
I-80 in South Centre Township
I-81 in Moosic
I-81 / I-476 / US 6 in South Abington Township. US 6/US 11 travel concurrently to northwest of Factoryville.
New York
I-81 in Dickinson
I-81 in Chenango
I-81 in Chenango
I-81 in Chenango
I-81 northwest of Whitney Point
I-81 in Cortlandville
I-81 northwest of Tully
US 20 south of LaFayette
I-81 south of Nedrow
I-81 in Salina
I-81 south-southwest of Mannsville
I-781 in Calcium
I-87 in the Town of Champlain
US 9 in the Town of Champlain
US 2 in Rouses Point
R-223 at the Canada–United States border north of Rouses Point

== Notes ==
Browse numbered routes
← LA 10	LA	→ I-12
← I-10	MS	→ MS 12
← I-10	AL	→ SR 12
← MD 10	MD	→ MD 12
← PA 10	PA	→ PA 12
