= Lake Pontchartrain Bridge =

Lake Pontchartrain Bridge may refer to:

- Lake Pontchartrain Causeway
- Norfolk Southern Lake Pontchartrain Bridge
- Maestri Bridge on US 11
- I-10 Twin Span Bridge
