= U.S. Route 11 in Louisiana =

Segment of American highway

U.S. Highway 11
- US 11 highlighted in red

Route information
- Maintained by Louisiana DOTD
- Length: 31.153 mi (50.136 km)
- Existed: 1939–present

Major junctions
- South end: US 90 in New Orleans
- I-10 in New Orleans; US 190 in Slidell; I-12 in Slidell; I-59 in Pearl River
- North end: I-59 / US 11 at Mississippi state line south of Nicholson

Location
- Country: United States
- State: Louisiana
- Parishes: Orleans, St. Tammany

Highway system
- United States Numbered Highway System; List; Special; Divided; Louisiana State Highway System; Interstate; US; State; Scenic
← LA 10	→ I-12

U.S. Highway 11 (US 11) is a part of the United States Numbered Highway System that spans 1,645 miles (2,647 km) (Note: Mileage given is via US 11W in Tennessee. The total length via US 11E is 1,765 miles (2,840 km).) from New Orleans, Louisiana, to Rouses Point, New York. Within the state of Louisiana, the highway travels 31 miles (50 km) from the national southern terminus at US 90 in New Orleans to the Mississippi state line south of Picayune.

From New Orleans East, US 11 crosses Lake Pontchartrain on the nearly five-mile-long (8.0 km) Maestri Bridge. The route parallels Interstate 10 (I-10) into Slidell, serving as that city's major north–south arterial. After crossing I-12, US 11 parallels I-59 to the town of Pearl River, at which point the two highways proceed concurrently across the state line.

The portion of US 11 between Slidell and Pearl River was once part of the Old Spanish Trail, an early auto trail that largely became the route of US 90 when the U.S. Numbered Highway System was implemented in 1926. US 11 originally terminated in Mississippi just northwest of what is now the Stennis Space Center. In 1937, US 90 was relocated onto a new route bypassing Slidell and Pearl River, significantly reducing the distance between New Orleans and the Mississippi Gulf Coast. US 11 was extended into Louisiana two years later over the former alignment of US 90, and the two routes were cosigned into Downtown New Orleans. This concurrency was discontinued in 1951 with US 11 being cut back to its current southern terminus at US 90 in New Orleans East.

Until the construction of the Interstate Highway System in the area during the late 1950s to mid-1960s, US 11 was one of two major routes eastward out of New Orleans, the other being US 90. Both still serve as important alternate routes to I-10 when hurricanes threaten the area, as was perhaps most evident when, in August 2005, Hurricane Katrina heavily damaged the nearby I-10 Twin Span Bridge over Lake Pontchartrain, rendering the crossing completely impassable for over six weeks. (The Maestri Bridge on US 11, constructed in 1928, had sustained only minor damage.) North of Pearl River, US 11 does not serve a similar function, however, since it was moved onto I-59 in 1965 and no longer retains a separate crossing over the various branches of the Pearl River system.

== Route description ==
=== New Orleans to Slidell ===
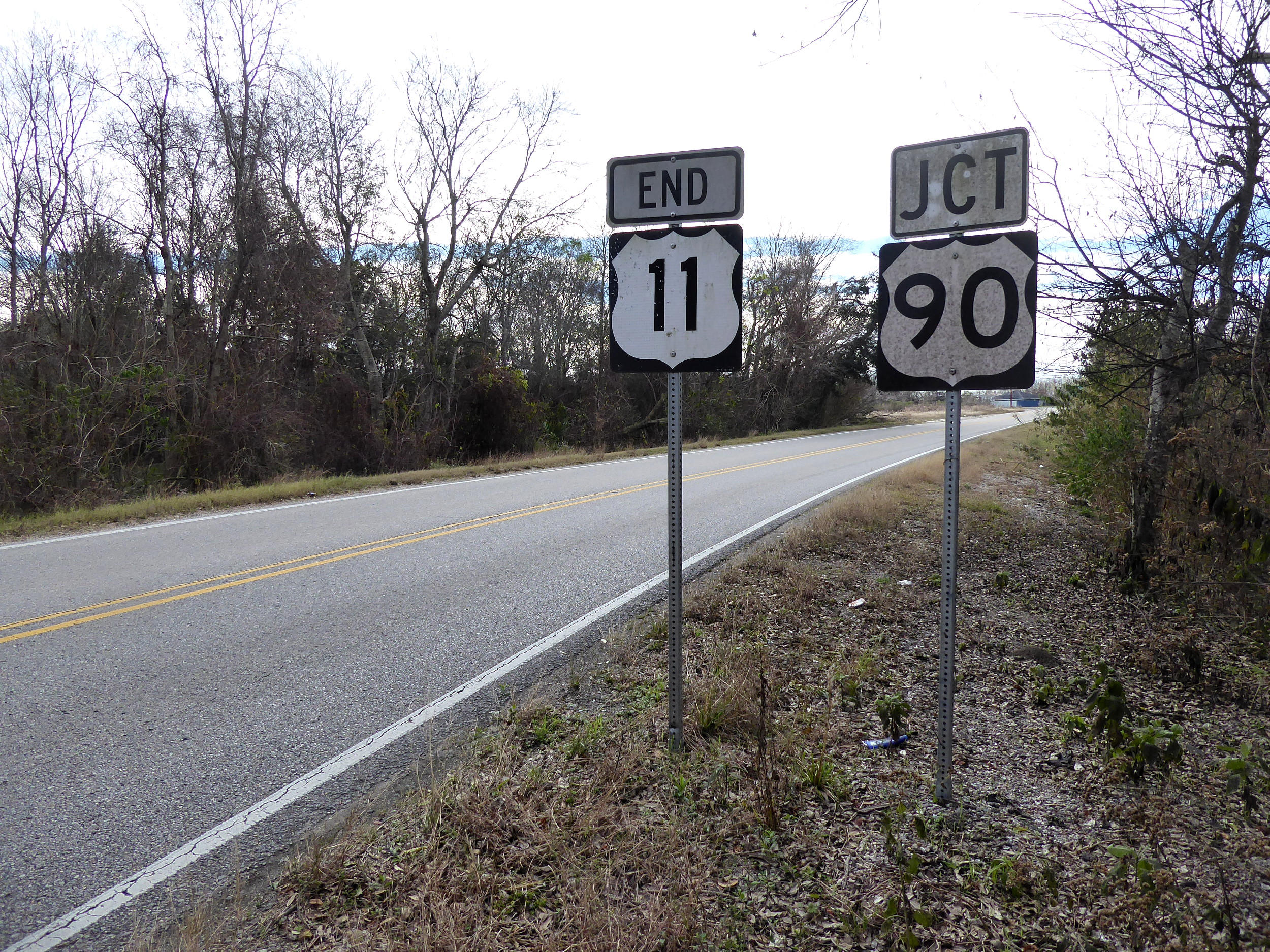
Southern terminus at US 90 in New Orleans

From the south, US 11 begins at an intersection with US 90 (Chef Menteur Highway) in New Orleans East between Michoud and Venetian Isles. It heads north along Ridgeway Boulevard as an undivided two-lane highway and travels through an area of marshland known as Irish Bayou. After 5.5 miles (8.9 km), the highway reaches Point Aux Herbes, where it passes through an interchange with I-10 at exit 254. US 11 immediately continues northeast onto the Maestri Bridge, a 4.8-mile-long (7.7 km) span across Lake Pontchartrain that parallels the I-10 Twin Span Bridge.

About midway across the lake, US 11 crosses from Orleans Parish (coextensive with the city of New Orleans) into St. Tammany Parish and begins to closely follow the east side of the Norfolk Southern Railway (NS) trestle. Making landfall in North Shore, US 11 becomes known as Pontchartrain Drive and passes through the community of Eden Isle. At Oak Harbor Boulevard, the highway enters the city of Slidell and widens to accommodate a center turn lane and a second travel lane in each direction. This portion of the highway serves as a commercial corridor for the surrounding suburban area.

=== Slidell to Mississippi state line ===
In Slidell, US 11 curves to the northwest and intersects Louisiana Highway 433 (LA 433; Old Spanish Trail). The center lane disappears, and the two highways run concurrent for a short distance until reaching an intersection with Front Street. Here, US 11 turns back to the northeast alongside the NS tracks while LA 433 continues straight ahead across the rail line onto Bayou Liberty Road. US 11 follows Front Street through Slidell's historic district and intersects US 190 Business (US 190 Bus.) at Fremaux Avenue, beginning a brief concurrency for several blocks to a junction with mainline US 190 at Gause Boulevard. Here, US 190 Bus. reaches its western terminus, and US 11 continues northward along Front Street, narrowing again to an undivided two-lane highway. Just beyond Indiana Avenue, US 11 crosses to the west side of the NS line via an overpass. Proceeding north for one mile (1.6 km), US 11 reaches the northern limit of Slidell and enters a partial cloverleaf interchange with I-12 at exit 83, briefly widening to a divided four-lane highway. I-12 connects with Hammond to the west and a major interchange with I-10 and I-59 a short distance to the east.

Returning to two-lane capacity, US 11 continues north through the small suburb of Alton and intersects LA 1091 (Robert Boulevard), entering the town of Pearl River. One mile (1.6 km) later, the highway intersects LA 41 (Watts Road), which heads north toward Bogalusa. From this intersection, LA 3081 continues north along Main Street while US 11 turns southeast onto Concord Boulevard and crosses the NS line at grade. Shortly afterward, US 11 enters an interchange with I-59 at exit 3, which also marks the northern terminus of LA 1090 (Military Road). US 11 turns north to follow the onramp to I-59 and utilizes the Interstate's alignment for the remainder of its distance in Louisiana.

After 1.5 miles (2.4 km), I-59/US 11 reaches exit 5A, which forms the northern terminus of LA 3081 and provides another connection to Pearl River. Immediately following this interchange, the highway crosses a bridge over the West Pearl River. Just north of the bridge is exit 5B, an interchange with a local road known as Old US 11, part of the pre-Interstate alignment that now serves Pearl River Wildlife Management Area. Exiting the Pearl River corporate limits, I-59/US 11 proceeds northward through the Honey Island Swamp and, after 5.3 miles (8.5 km), reaches its final interchange, exit 11 (Pearl River Turnaround). It then crosses the main branch of the Pearl River into Mississippi at a point 2.5 miles (4.0 km) south of Picayune.

=== Route classification and data ===
US 11 is generally classified as a rural or urban minor arterial by the Louisiana Department of Transportation and Development (DOTD). However, the section in Slidell between LA 433 and I-12 serves as an urban principal arterial. The annual average daily traffic (AADT) in 2016 ranged between about 18,900 vehicles near downtown Slidell and 3,250 in Irish Bayou, south of the Maestri Bridge. The posted speed limit is generally 55 mph (89 km/h) in rural areas, reduced to between 35 and 45 mph (56 and 72 km/h) through town.

The portion of US 11 utilizing the route of I-59 is classified as an urban Interstate through Pearl River and as a rural Interstate northward to the state line. Daily traffic volume in 2016 peaked at 29,400 vehicles, and the posted speed limit is 70 mph (110 km/h).

== History ==
=== Mississippi terminuses ===
US 11 was designated in November 1926 as one of the inaugural routes of the U.S. Numbered Highway System. The original southern terminus was located in Santa Rosa, Mississippi, (Note: This location is shown on some maps as Tigerville, Mississippi.) at a junction with US 90, the present intersection of Mississippi Highway 607 (MS 607) and Old US 11. At that time, US 90 followed the general route of US 11 through Slidell and Pearl River. (Note: The original American Association of State Highway Officials (AASHO) log ambiguously locates the southern terminus of US 11 at the Louisiana–Mississippi state line east of Pearl River. Other AASHO materials, as well as departmental maps by Mississippi's state highway agency, show US 11 cosigned with US 90 into Downtown New Orleans. However, this is not reflected in official maps of the day by the Louisiana Highway Commission.) After crossing the state line into Mississippi, US 90 intersected US 11 then curved back to the south, bypassing Pearlington on the way to Bay St. Louis. This route duplicated that of the Old Spanish Trail, an auto trail designated in 1916, (Note: Though the route was conceived in 1915, its founding was observed in 1916, and the route was mapped that year.) predating the U.S. Numbered Highway System. Since 1921, the Louisiana portion had also carried the designation of State Route 2 (SR 2), as did all of US 90 throughout the state. (Note: The route also carried the internal designation of SR 1092, which overlapped all of the original alignment of SR 2.)

In December 1935, the current route of US 90 running directly between the Fort Pike Bridge and Pearlington was opened, shortening the distance from New Orleans to the Mississippi Gulf Coast by 22 miles (35 km). Once US 90 was officially shifted onto the cutoff in June 1937, (Note: The original state designation for the Rigolets–Pearlington cutoff was SR C-1334.) US 11 was extended south to meet it at the present intersection of MS 604 and MS 607. (Note: Departmental maps by Mississippi's state highway agency show this road segment connecting US 11 and US 90 as MS 11-90.) The following year, a second cutoff was opened, placing US 90 on its current alignment between Pearlington and MS 607 west of Waveland. US 11 was again extended to intersect US 90, following MS 604 southward into Pearlington. (Note: Again, internal maps by Mississippi's highway agency show no change in the route of US 11 and label the road segment vacated by US 90 as part of MS 11-90.)

=== Extension into Louisiana ===
In June 1939, the Louisiana Highway Commission successfully petitioned the American Association of State Highway Officials (AASHO) to have US 11 moved onto the former route of US 90 through Pearl River and Slidell and joined with US 90 to the intersection of Canal and North Broad streets in New Orleans. From the original southern terminus at Santa Rosa, US 11 then followed what is known as Old US 11, now a largely abandoned local road, to the state line where it crossed a now-demolished bridge over the Pearl River. It then continued onto Old US 11 in Louisiana, locally maintained today as part of Pearl River Wildlife Management Area, to the site of the interchange with I-59 and the current route of US 11. Continuing southwest, US 11 crossed a second demolished bridge over the West Pearl River, entering the town of Pearl River. It then followed Main Street through town, state-maintained today as part of LA 3081 and LA 3081 Spur, and rejoined the present alignment at LA 41 (Watts Road). Maps from 1939 indicate that US 11 briefly continued along the former route of US 90, turning southeast onto LA 433 to an intersection with current US 90 at the Fort Pike Bridge. Including the concurrency with US 90 into Downtown New Orleans, this routing would have represented the longest expanse of US 11 in Louisiana, totaling 51.8 miles (83.4 km).

The permanent rerouting of US 11 as approved by AASHO became effective on January 1, 1940. At this time, US 11 assumed its present routing across Lake Pontchartrain via the Maestri Bridge. Originally known as the Pontchartrain Bridge (or Watson-Williams Bridge, after its backers), the nearly five-mile-long (8.0 km) span was opened on February 18, 1928, and initially operated as a toll bridge. The bridge was the subject of much controversy and was a hot issue in several political campaigns during the 1920s. Louisiana Governor Oramel H. Simpson successfully advocated for free bridges to be constructed for US 90 across Chef Menteur Pass and the Rigolets, and, though the route was seven miles (11 km) longer, the completion of the free spans in 1929 and 1930 led to the financial ruin of the toll bridge. In December 1938, the state of Louisiana purchased the Pontchartrain Bridge at auction, (Note: Now under state control, the bridge and its approaches was designated SR C-1580.) eliminated the tolls, and renamed it after New Orleans's mayor, Robert Maestri. (Note: Adding to the list of names, the bridge is primarily referred to locally as the Five-Mile Bridge or simply the Highway 11 Bridge.) Once US 11 was routed onto the Maestri Bridge, it continued south through Irish Bayou to its present southern terminus at US 90 and continued into town cosigned with US 90. The contemporary route of US 90 followed the current route from US 11 to Michoud; Old Gentilly Road to a point formerly known as Lee Station, where it rejoined Chef Menteur Highway; Chef Menteur Highway across the Industrial Canal and onto Gentilly Boulevard; Gentilly Boulevard to Paris Avenue; then south onto Paris and St. Bernard avenues to North Broad Street; and finally, southwest onto North Broad Street to Canal Street. This routing of US 11 in Louisiana totaled 44.7 miles (71.9 km).

In May 1942, the opening of the Michoud Cutoff on Chef Menteur Highway bypassed the portion of Old Gentilly Road between Lee Station and Michoud, straightening the route of US 11-90 and eliminating two grade crossings. In 1951, the Louisiana Department of Highways eliminated several U.S. Highway concurrencies. US 51 and US 65 were removed from their concurrencies with US 61 into New Orleans, and US 11 was truncated to its present southern terminus near Irish Bayou. The number of U.S. Highway designations intersecting at Canal and North Broad streets was thus reduced from five to two (US 61 and US 90).

=== Interstate 59 ===
In July 1963, construction of I-59 was completed from Pearl River northward across the Mississippi state line with the opening of the I-59 West Pearl River Bridge. The US 11 West Pearl River Bridge, originally opened in 1926, was closed due to safety reasons in 1964 and slated for demolition. US 11 traffic was detoured onto I-59 via exit 3 at LA 1090 (Military Road). This detour became permanent the following year with US 11 assuming its current routing cosigned with I-59 between Pearl River and Nicholson, Mississippi. The move was unpopular with the St. Tammany Parish police jury and with residents of Pearl River who would now have to travel several miles out of their way to reach Picayune, Mississippi. In response, the Louisiana Department of Highways reopened the bridge to local traffic only to declare it unsafe again in 1968. After further protests, the state made temporary repairs to the bridge to serve local traffic until an additional interchange was constructed to better connect the town with northbound I-59. Exit 5A on I-59/US 11 was opened in 1971 as part of LA 41 Spur (now LA 3081), and the old US 11 bridge was demolished.

=== Aborted extensions ===
Early expressway plans in New Orleans called for an "Eastern Expressway" branching off of US 11 at the foot of the Maestri Bridge and running parallel to US 90 toward Downman Road. During the 1950s and early 1960s, the projected route was labeled on some maps as "Alternate Route US 11". However, this designation was dropped once plans for the Interstate Highway System progressed, and the expressway was later constructed as a section of I-10. The portion from US 11 west to Paris Road was opened on April 24, 1967, and the portion from there west toward Downman Road was opened on October 18, 1972.

Another proposal in the 1960s was much grander in scale and called for US 11 to be extended along existing highways from New Orleans through Texas to the Mexican border. As the northern terminus of the highway has always been located at the Canadian border at Rouses Point, New York, US 11 would have been part of an international route connecting three countries. The proposed route through southwestern Louisiana was to be part of a revival and extension of an early auto trail known as the Hug the Coast Highway. Heading west from New Orleans, the route would have been concurrent with US 90 through Houma and Morgan City to New Iberia. It would then follow LA 14 to Abbeville and LA 82 to the Texas state line at Port Arthur, Texas. The route would then proceed along the coast of the Gulf of Mexico through Galveston and Corpus Christi toward the Mexican border.

The Hug the Coast Highway Association worked with the Louisiana Department of Highways and the Texas Department of Transportation for over a decade to get the project off the ground. Louisiana made several improvements to its part of the route, most notably a high-level bridge across the Gulf Intracoastal Waterway in Vermilion Parish. A 1964 press release by the Louisiana Department of Highways indicated that the designation was anticipated by the following year and that the highway would be available for travel to the 1968 Summer Olympics in Mexico City. However, other improvements necessary to meet the standards set by the American Association of State Highway and Transportation Officials (AASHTO) for U.S. Highway numbering did not come to fruition, and the project fizzled during the 1970s.

== Future ==
=== Construction projects ===
Several construction projects are planned or in progress for US 11. These include a $21.9-million contract to recondition the two bascule spans of the Maestri Bridge over Lake Pontchartrain. The project was begun in May 2016 and is scheduled for completion in early 2021.

Additionally, a project to widen US 11 to four lanes from US 190 (Gause Boulevard) to I-12 is in the preliminary stages. This will give US 11 a four-lane corridor throughout the city of Slidell. The project will necessitate the replacement of the current two-lane overpass of the NS line, which was constructed in 1937 as part of the former SR 2.

=== Route realignment ===
DOTD is currently engaged in a program that aims to transfer about 5,000 miles (8,000 km) of state-owned roadways to local governments over the next several years. Under this plan of "right-sizing" the state highway system, the portion of US 11 between US 190 (Gause Boulevard) in Slidell and LA 41 in Pearl River is proposed for deletion as it no longer meet a significant interurban travel function.

== Junction list ==
Exit numbers reflect I-59 mileage only.

Parish	Location	mi	km	Exit	Destinations	Notes
Orleans	New Orleans	0.000	0.000		US 90 (Chef Menteur Highway) – New Orleans, Gulfport	Southern terminus; to Fort Pike State Historic Site; location also known as Irish Bayou
Orleans	New Orleans	5.175– 5.833	8.328– 9.387		I-10 – New Orleans, Slidell	Exit 254 on I-10; location also known as Point Aux Herbes
Orleans–St. Tammany parish line	New Orleans	5.887– 10.607	9.474– 17.070	Robert S. Maestri Bridge over Lake Pontchartrain		
St. Tammany	Slidell	14.725– 14.765	23.698– 23.762		LA 433 east (Old Spanish Trail) to I-10	Southern end of LA 433 concurrency
St. Tammany	Slidell	15.056	24.230		LA 433 west (Bayou Liberty Road)	Northern end of LA 433 concurrency
St. Tammany	Slidell	15.784	25.402		US 190 Bus. east (Fremaux Avenue) to I-10	Southern end of US 190 Bus. concurrency
St. Tammany	Slidell	16.421	26.427		US 190 (Gause Boulevard) to I-10 US 190 Bus. ends	Western terminus of US 190 Bus.; northern end of US 190 Bus. concurrency
St. Tammany	Slidell	17.985– 18.295	28.944– 29.443		I-12 – Bay St. Louis, Hammond	Exit 83 on I-12
St. Tammany	Pearl River	20.681	33.283		LA 1091 south (Robert Boulevard) – Haaswood	Northern terminus of LA 1091
St. Tammany	Pearl River	21.787	35.063		LA 41 north (Watts Road) LA 3081 north (Main Street)	Southern terminus of LA 41 and LA 3081
St. Tammany	Pearl River	22.416– 23.098	36.075– 37.173		I-59 south – New Orleans LA 1090 south (Military Road)	Southern end of I-59 concurrency (exit 3 on I-59); northern terminus of LA 1090
St. Tammany	Pearl River	24.265– 24.731	39.051– 39.801	5A	LA 3081 – Pearl River	Northern terminus of LA 3081
St. Tammany	Pearl River	24.806– 25.312	39.921– 40.736	Bridge over West Pearl River		
St. Tammany	Pearl River	25.359– 25.860	40.811– 41.618	5B	Honey Island Swamp	
St. Tammany		30.733– 31.053	49.460– 49.975	11	Pearl River Turnaround	
St. Tammany		31.065– 31.153	49.994– 50.136	Bridge over Pearl River		
St. Tammany		31.065– 31.153	49.994– 50.136		I-59 north / US 11 north – Hattiesburg	Continuation in Mississippi
1.000 mi = 1.609 km; 1.000 km = 0.621 mi: Concurrency terminus

== Notes ==
U.S. Route 11
Previous state: Terminus	Louisiana	Next state: Mississippi
