= Lake Pontchartrain Causeway =

Parallel bridges in Louisiana, United States

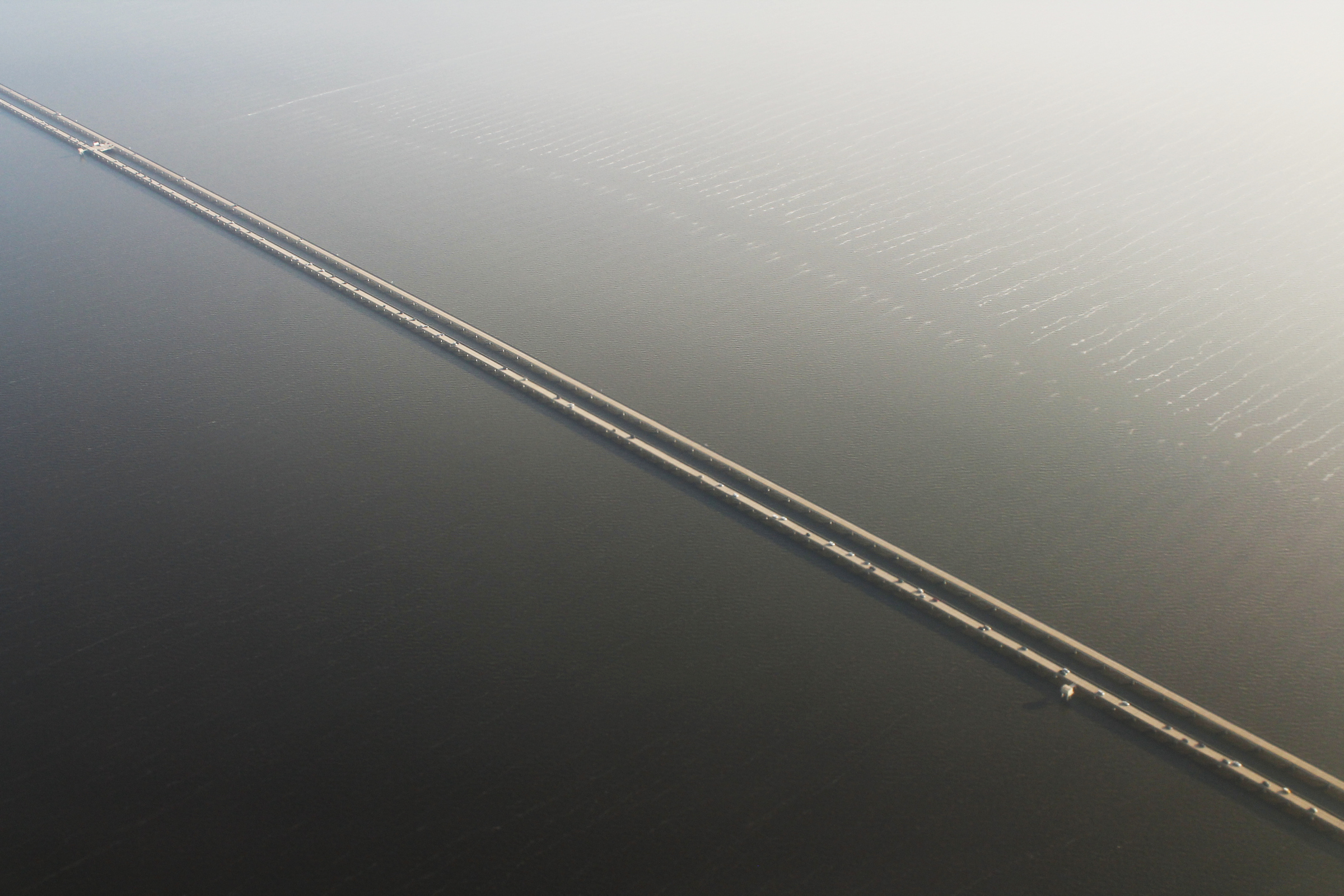
- Aerial view of the causeway
- Coordinates: 30°11′59″N 90°07′22″W
- Carries: 4 lanes of Causeway Boulevard
- Crosses: Lake Pontchartrain
- Locale: Metairie and Mandeville, Louisiana, U.S.
- Other name: The Causeway
- Maintained by: Causeway Commission

Characteristics
- Design: Low-level trestle with mid-span bascule
- Total length: 23.87 mi (38.42 km)
- Clearance above: 15 ft (4.6 m)

History
- Opened: August 30, 1956 (southbound); May 10, 1969 (northbound)

Statistics
- Daily traffic: 43,000
- Toll: $6.00 (southbound)

Location
- Interactive map of Lake Pontchartrain Causeway

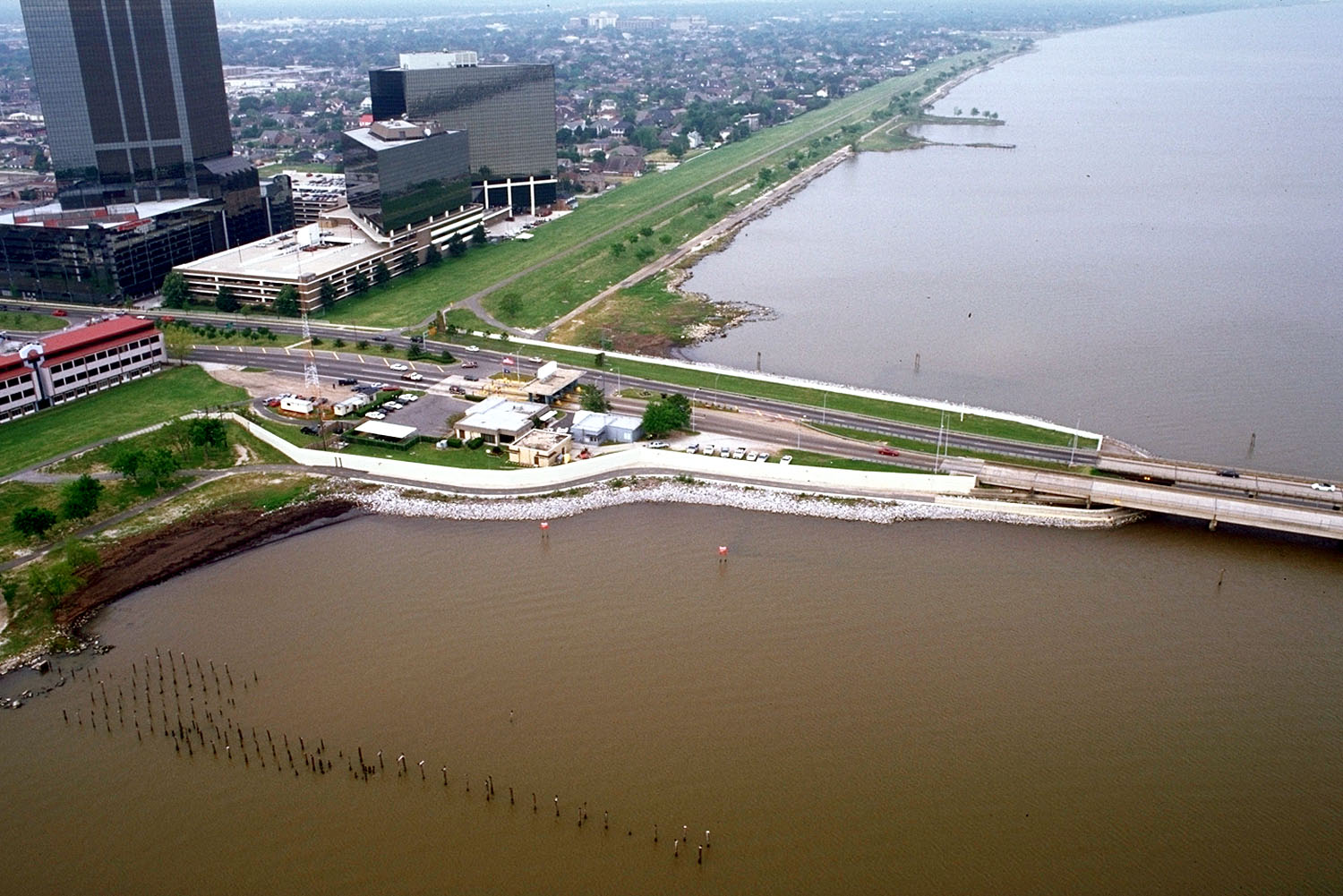
The southern end of the causeway at Metairie, Louisiana, in 1998

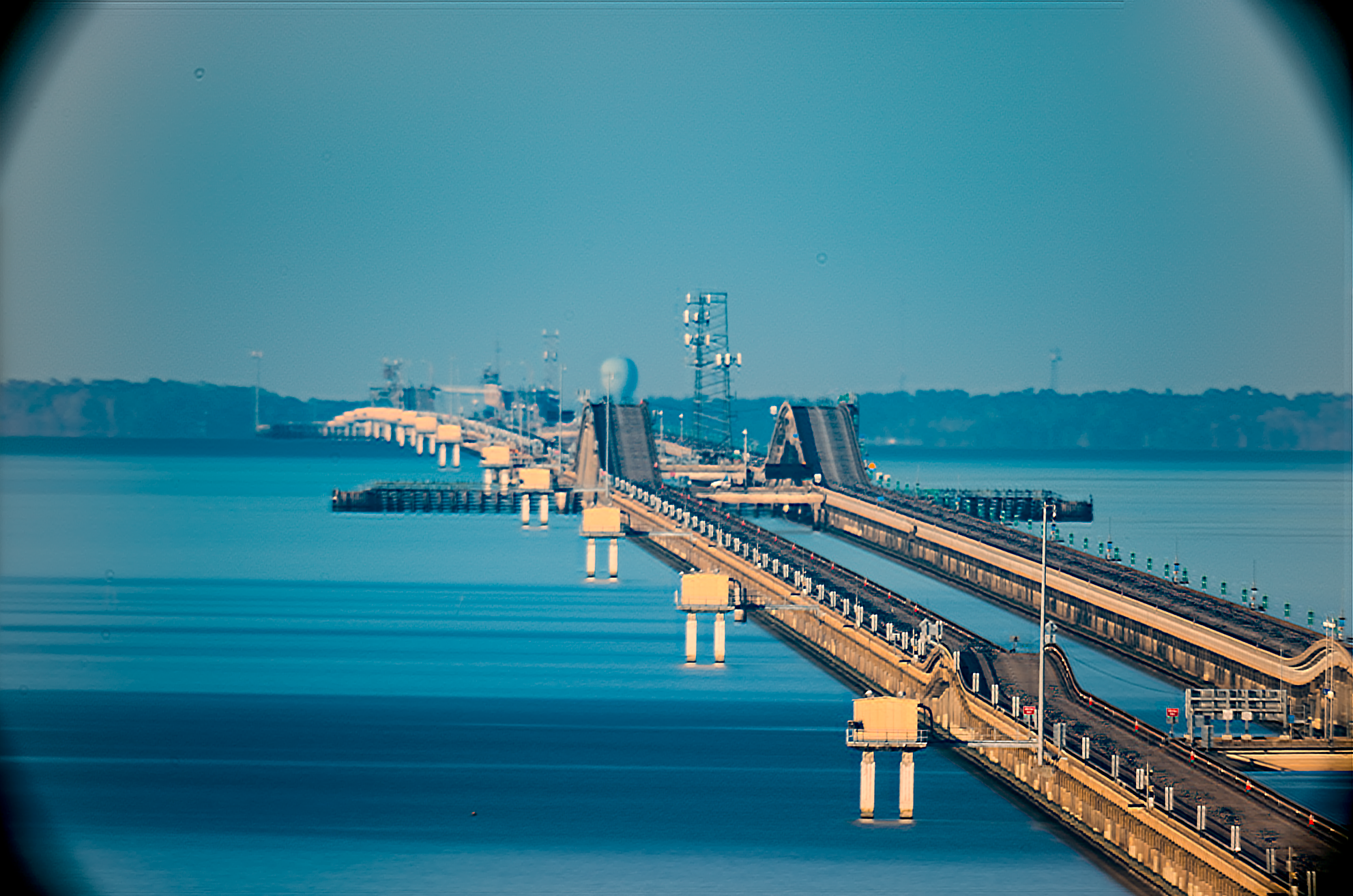
Photo of the causeway taken from a vantage point chosen to display its curvature

The Lake Pontchartrain Causeway (French: Chaussée du lac Pontchartrain), also known simply as The Causeway, is a fixed link composed of two parallel bridges crossing Lake Pontchartrain in southeastern Louisiana, United States. The longer of the two bridges is 23.83 miles (38.35 km) long. The southern terminus of the causeway is in Metairie, Louisiana, and the northern terminus is in Mandeville, Louisiana. Both are in the New Orleans metropolitan area.

The Lake Pontchartrain Causeway holds the Guinness World Record for longest continuous span over water in the world. It previously was listed as longest bridge over water in the world; in 2011, in response to the opening of the Qingdao Jiaozhou Bay Bridge in China, Guinness World Records created two categories for bridges over water: Lake Pontchartrain Causeway then became the longest bridge over water (continuous), while the Jiaozhou Bay Bridge became the longest bridge over water (aggregate).

The bridges are supported by 9,500 concrete pilings. A bascule bridge spans the navigation channel 8 miles (13 km) south of the north shore.

== History ==
The idea of a bridge across Lake Pontchartrain dates to the early 19th century and Bernard de Marigny, the founder of Mandeville. He started a ferry service that operated into the mid-1930s. In the 1920s, a proposal called for the creation of artificial islands that would then be linked by a series of bridges. The financing for this plan would come from selling home sites on the islands. The modern causeway started to take form in 1948 when Ernest M. Loëb Jr. envisioned the project. Due to his lobbying and vision, the Louisiana Legislature created what is now the Causeway Commission. The Louisiana Bridge Company was formed to construct the bridge, which in turn appointed James E. Walters Sr. to direct the project. Ernest M Loëb was assisted by his nephew, Ernest M. Loëb III, president of Ernest M. Loëb & Company, to plan the construction of the bridge

Satellite view. The Manchac Swamp Bridge can be seen on the left.

The original causeway was a two-lane span, 23.86 miles (38.40 km) long. It opened on August 30th 1956, at a cost of $56 million (equivalent to $500 million in 2024 dollars). This included the bridge, three approach roads on the north end, and a long stretch of road on the south end.

On June 16, 1964, six people died when barges tore a gap in the bridge and a bus plunged into the lake.

A parallel two-lane span, 0.01 miles (16 m) longer than the original, opened on May 10, 1969, at a cost of $30 million (equivalent to $200 million in 2024 dollars).

Since its construction, the causeway has operated as a toll bridge. Until 1999, tolls were collected from traffic going in each direction. To alleviate congestion on the south shore, toll collections were eliminated on the northbound span. In May 1999, the standard tolls for cars changed from $1.50 in each direction to a $3 toll collected on the North Shore for southbound traffic. In 2017, the toll was raised to fund safety improvements on the bridge. The toll changed from $3.00 with cash and $2.00 with a toll tag to $5.00 with cash and $3.00 with a toll tag. Toll prices increased once again in 2023 to $6.00 and $3.40 for drivers with a toll tag.

The opening of the causeway boosted the fortunes of small North Shore communities by reducing drive time into New Orleans by up to 50 minutes, bringing the North Shore into the New Orleans metropolitan area. Prior to the causeway, residents of St. Tammany Parish used either the Maestri Bridge on U.S. Highway 11 (US 11) or the Rigolets Bridge on US 90, both near Slidell, Louisiana; or on the west side, via US 51 through Manchac, Louisiana.

After Hurricane Katrina on August 29, 2005, videos collected showed damage to the bridge. The storm surge was not as high under the causeway as it was near the I-10 Twin Span Bridge, and damage was mostly limited to the turnarounds. A total of 17 spans were lost on that bridge but the structural foundations remained intact. The causeways have never sustained major damage of any sort from hurricanes or other natural occurrences, a rarity among causeways. With the I-10 Twin Span Bridge severely damaged, the causeway was used as a major route for recovery teams staying inland to the north to get into New Orleans. The causeway reopened first to emergency traffic and then to the general public—with tolls suspended—on September 19, 2005. Tolls were reinstated by mid-October of that year.

The Lake Pontchartrain Causeway is one of seven highway spans in Louisiana with a total length of 5 miles (8.0 km) or more. The others are, in order from longest to shortest, the Manchac Swamp Bridge on I-55, the Atchafalaya Basin Bridge on I-10, the Louisiana Highway 1 Bridge, the Bonnet Carré Spillway Bridge on I-10, the Chacahoula Swamp Bridge on US 90, the Lake Pontchartrain Twin Spans on I-10, and the LaBranche Wetlands Bridge on I-310. The Maestri Bridge comes close, but runs short by two-tenths of a mile at roughly 4.8 miles (7.7 km) in total length. Louisiana is also home to the Norfolk Southern Lake Pontchartrain Bridge, which at 5.8 miles (9.3 km) is one of the longest railway bridges in the United States.

The southern end of the Manchac Swamp Bridge (on the western edge of Lake Pontchartrain) is the western end of the I-10 Bonnet Carré Spillway Bridge (on the southwestern edge of Lake Pontchartrain), and the northern end of the LaBranche Wetlands Bridge is the eastern end of the I-10 Bonnet Carré Spillway Bridge; so these three bridges, by name, are in fact one contiguous bridge. The total driving distance on continuous elevated roadway is over 38 miles (61 km).

The bridge was designated as a National Historic Civil Engineering Landmark by the American Society of Civil Engineers in 2013.

=== Guinness World Records controversy ===
For decades, Lake Pontchartrain Causeway was listed by Guinness World Records as the longest bridge over water in the world. In July 2011, the Jiaozhou Bay Bridge in China was named by Guinness World Records as the 'longest bridge over water'. At that time, there was some controversy in the United States as supporters of the former holder of the record, the Lake Pontchartrain Causeway, disagreed with Guinness World Records not calling the causeway the longest. Supporters made this claim based on its own definition, i.e. the length of a bridge physically over water, and concluded that the Lake Pontchartrain Causeway spans 23.79 mi (38.28 km), and was therefore the longest. The Jiaozhou Bay Bridge spans water for only 16.1 mi (25.9 km). However, Guinness World Records, using the criteria of measurement that included aggregate structures, such as land bridges on the ends and an under-sea tunnel, stated that the Jiaozhou Bay Bridge is 26.5 mi (42.6 km) long. Following this controversy in July 2011, Guinness World Records created two categories for bridges over water: continuous and aggregate lengths over water. Lake Pontchartrain Causeway then became the longest bridge over water (continuous), while Jiaozhou Bay Bridge became the longest bridge over water (aggregate).

== Gallery ==
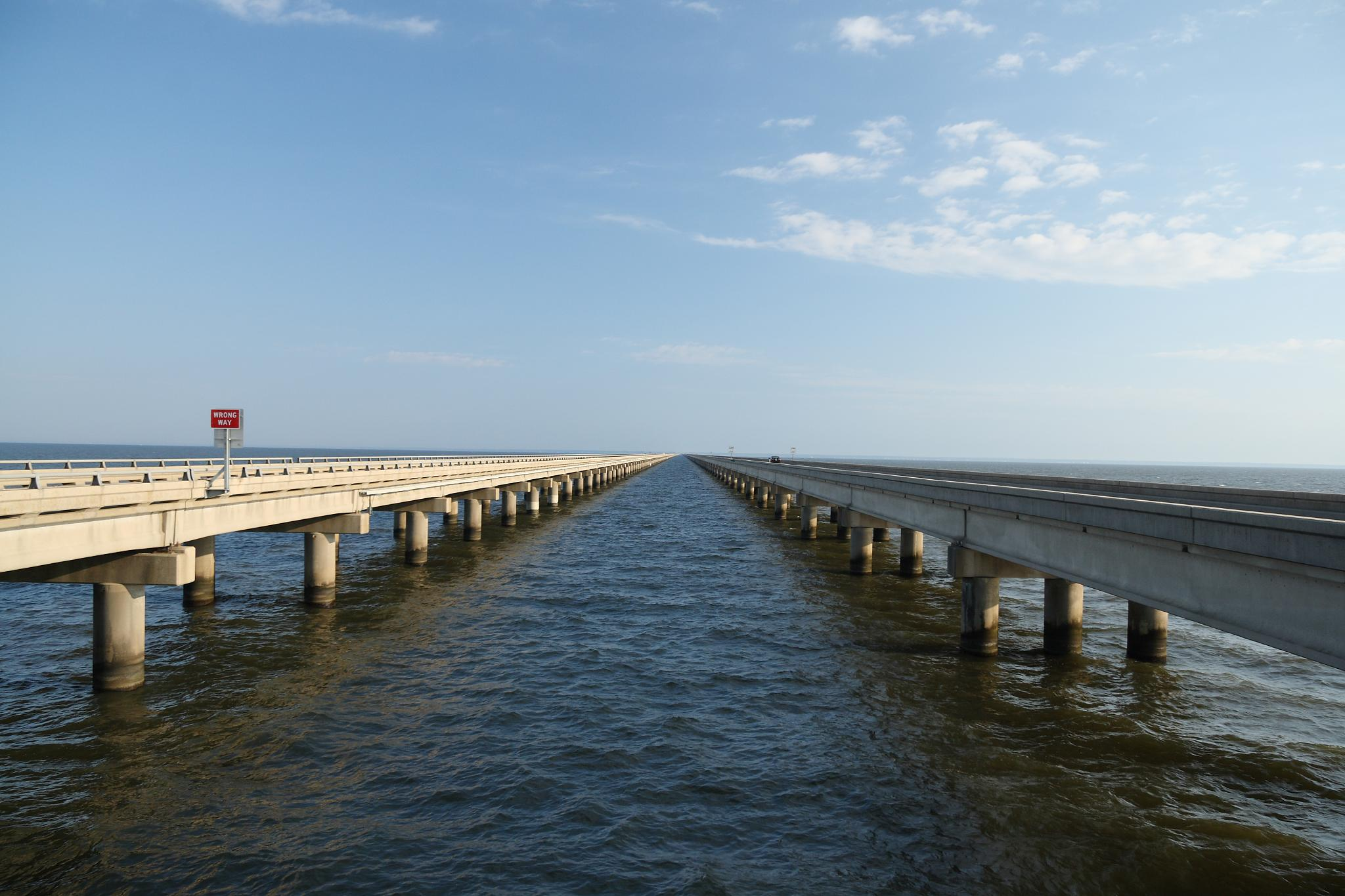

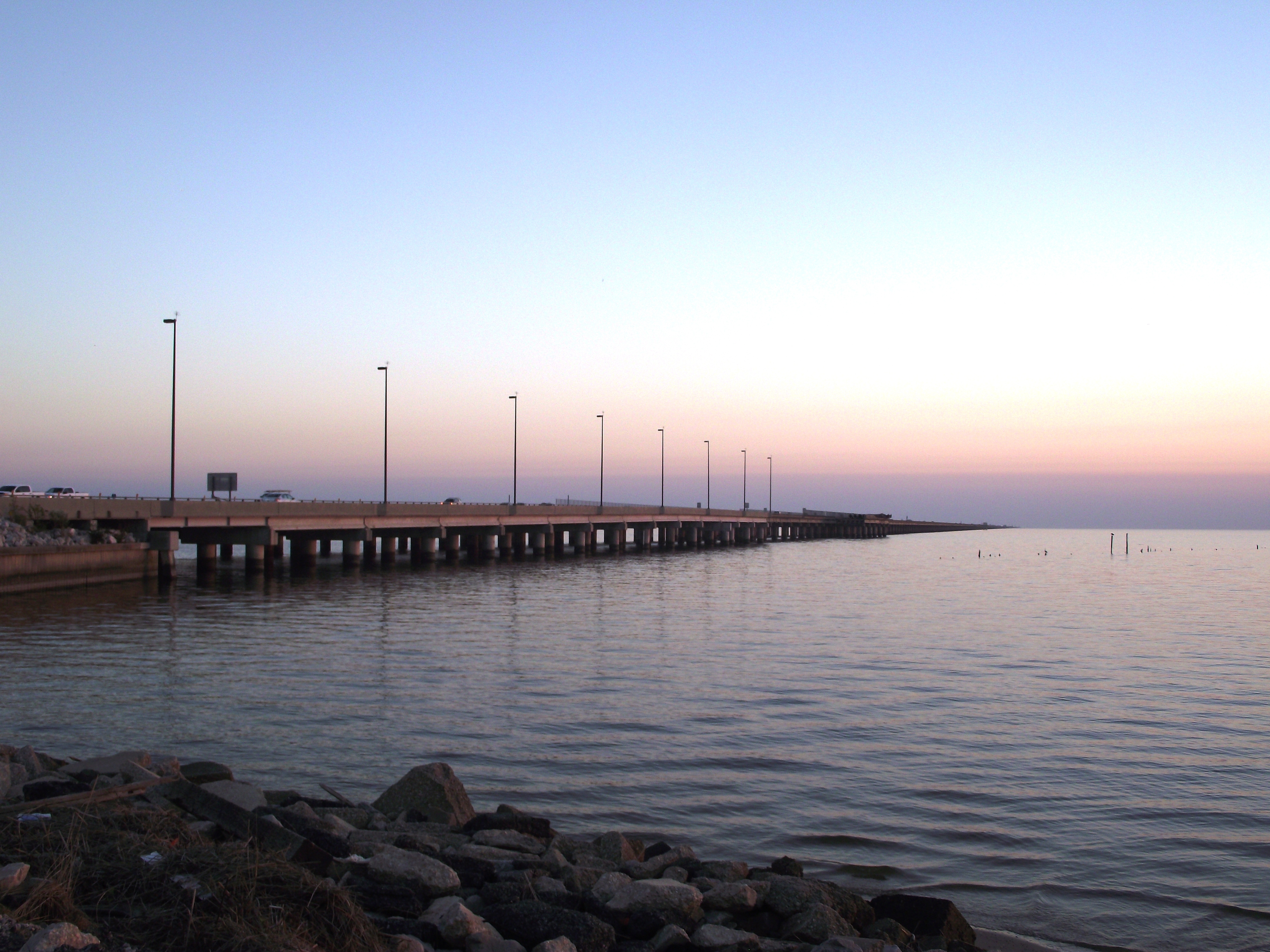
Lake Pontchartrain Causeway southbound

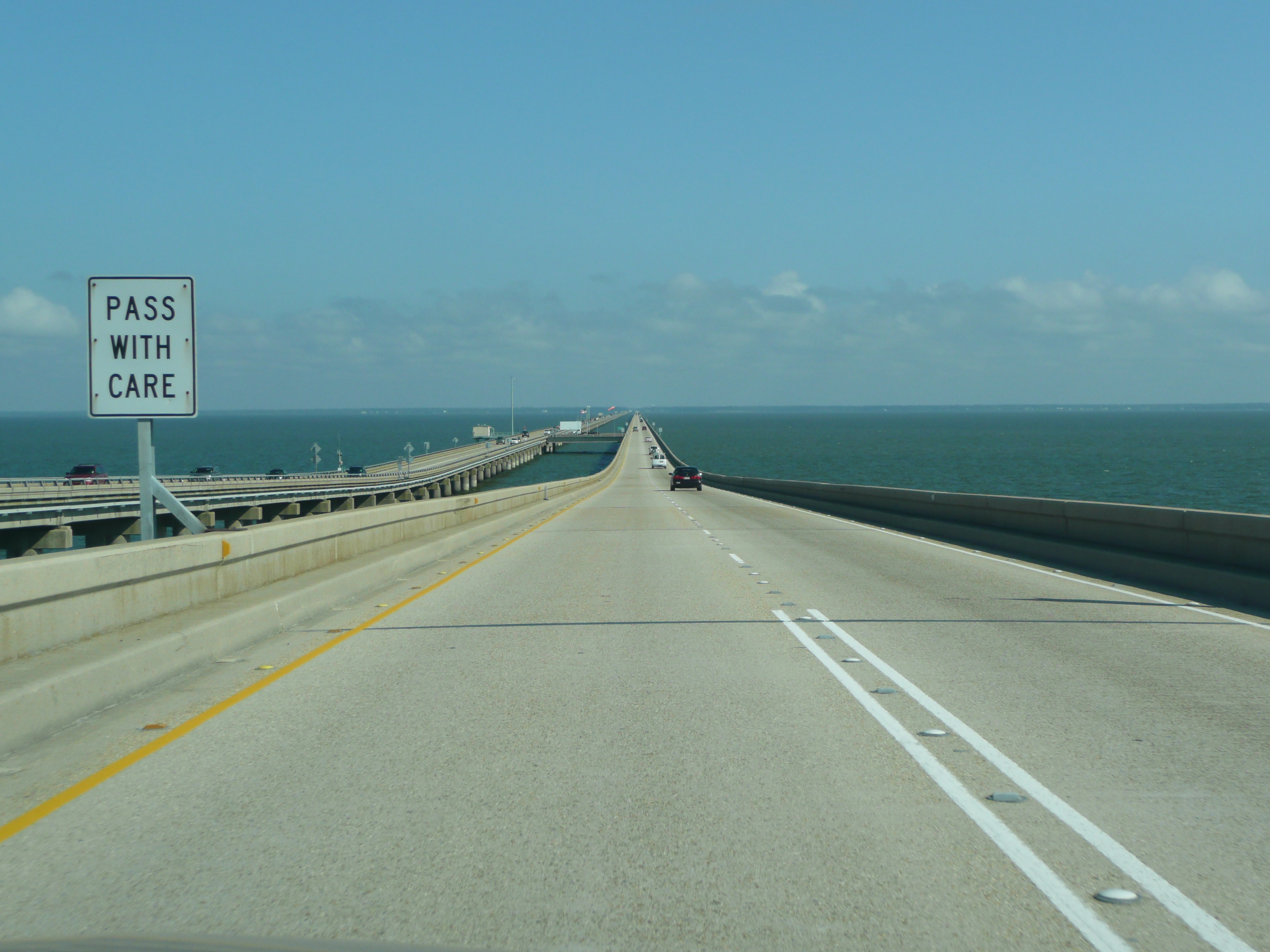
Heading north on Lake Pontchartrain Causeway

== See also ==
- List of bridges in the United States
- List of longest bridges in the world
- Megaproject
- Prestressed concrete
