= Fritchie Marsh =

Marsh in Louisiana, United States

Coordinates: 30.208°N 89.726°W

Fritchie Marsh is an area encompassing 6,291 acres of intermediate and brackish marsh located about 3 miles southeast of Slidell, Louisiana, United States. This wetland was originally documented as a freshwater marsh, but has since been identified as a mixed intermediate and brackish marsh, and it threatens to become open salt water. Through the combined efforts of conservation groups and sponsors, the Fritchie Marsh Restoration Project was created and designed to restore the area to its original state. In the early years, this project showed a positive impact but soon suffered a devastating impact during Hurricane Katrina.

== Classification ==
Although the Fritchie Marsh area was documented in 1956 as a freshwater marsh, currently the area is labeled as containing both intermediate and brackish marshland, distinguished based on the level of salinity. Brackish marshland typically averages in salinity at 8 parts per thousand of salt (ppt), whereas intermediate marshland typically averages at 3.3 ppt. For a marsh to be considered a freshwater marsh, the salinity level cannot exceed 2 ppt. With an increase in salinity comes a decrease in plant diversity and soil organic matter. Therefore, freshwater marshlands support the greatest variety of plant and animal life, followed by intermediate marshland and brackish marshland, respectively.

The intermediate marshland areas of Fritchie Marsh are dominated by salt marsh hay. Big cordgrass and alligator weed are also found there. Because salt marsh hay tolerates a wide variety of salinity levels, it is also the dominating grass found in brackish marshland areas of Fritchie Marsh. Salt grass also tolerates the higher salinity of the brackish marsh.

A shift from intermediate to brackish marshland is possible when salinity levels increase. These shifts enerally are thought to occur throughout Louisiana wetlands from the intrusion of salt water.

== Initial issues ==
The conversion and loss of marshland within Fritchie Marsh has been attributed to its enclosure by highways. US Highway 433 forms the southern and western borders of Fritchie Marsh. Louisiana Highway 90 forms the eastern border and Louisiana Highway 190 forms the northern border. Although these highways have not been proven to be to blame for the deterioration of the marshland, some strongly believe that they have had a great negative impact.

The natural hydrology of Fritchie Marsh heavily depends on deposits from the West Pearl River. The West Pearl River provides the area with freshwater, nutrients, and the sediment that is necessary to sustain a freshwater marsh. However, the enclosure of Fritchie Marsh by its bordering highways cut the area off from many of the necessary deposits coming from the West Pearl River. A small culvert placed under Louisiana Highway 90 allowed minimal input into Fritchie Marsh from the West Pearl River. At the same time, salt water spills into the area from Lake Pontchartrain through Little Lagoon and the W14 canal located along the Louisiana Highway 433 western border. The salt water penetration was not continuous but occurred frequently during strong winds and high tides. The combination of damaging salt water breaches along with the lack of freshwater and sediment input into Fritchie Marsh resulted in a shift away from freshwater marshland of 1956 towards a nearly brackish marshland visible by 1990. Some conservations believed that if allowed to continue with this trend, Fritchie Marsh would be destroyed and would be converted into an open body of salt water.

== Fritchie Marsh Restoration Project ==
The Fritchie Marsh Restoration Project was approved in 1992. The project was deemed a hydrologic restoration project that would encompass 5,941 acres of the total 6,291 acre Fritchie Marsh. The project's cost of $2.2 million was approved, as well. After 20 years, an estimated 1,040 acres of marshland would be restored to their original state. The project was placed on a priority list, and the waiting game for sponsorship began.

By October 2000, the Fritchie Marsh Restoration Project had acquired both federal and local sponsorship. Locally, the Louisiana Coastal Protection and Restoration Authority in Baton Rouge agreed to sponsor the project. The Natural Resources Conservation Service also signed on as a federal sponsor for the project.

The main idea behind the Fritchie Marsh Restoration Project was simple - returning the natural hydrology to the area would restore the area to its previous condition. However, the adjustments necessary to achieve this would not be so simple. First, deposits from the West Pearl River needed to increase drastically. This would be achieved by increasing the size of the culvert under Louisiana Highway 90. Secondly, water flow and capacity would need to be improved. Dredging portions of nearby Salt Bayou would achieve this. Finally, an additional freshwater input into the area was necessary to combat the frequent saltwater intrusion. By building a weir and diverting water from the W14 canal into it, the upland runoff from the city of Slidell could become an additional freshwater, sediment and nutrient contribution to the marsh. The project was completed in a single phase ending in February 2001.

== Monitoring and reference ==
To assure project quality and measure the positive impact to Fritchie Marsh, a plan for observation and evaluation was necessary. A monitoring plan for the project was originally established on July 2, 1996, and revised in July 1998 and again in August 2003. The first revision to the monitoring plan was done to mimic the monitoring plan for similar projects. Specifically, the plant diversity was to be quantified every three years to determine vegetative health of the area. Also, the salinity was to be monitored continuously through 2005. The second revision to the monitoring plan was done in accordance with the Breaux Act.

Measurements and quality assessments performed prior to, during, and following the Fritchie Marsh Restoration Project's completion could not be of statistical value without comparison against measurements taken at a control site. Thus, a reference area with similar ecological qualities was chosen as a control from which the project's impact to Fritchie Marsh could be compared. The reference area, located between Highway 11 and the Illinois Central Railroad, was conveniently only a few miles away from Fritchie Marsh. It shared similar vegetation, salinity, and hydrology to Fritchie Marsh, as well. At the start of the project, both Fritchie Marsh and the reference area were predominantly dominated by brackish marshland. Both areas also showed similar ratios of marshland loss. Because of these similarities, the post project values could be statistically compared to that of the control reference area, which did not receive any treatment.

Five main assessments were made in the Fritchie Marsh area and compared to the control reference area. First, habitat mapping was performed in both areas to visually display the land to water ratios prior to and throughout the project and its monitoring period. Secondly, salinity was recorded nearly continuously at several monitoring stations within the project and reference areas. Thirdly, water level was measured and recorded hourly to assess freshwater input into the project area. Fourthly, current meters were used to measure and record water flow within the project area. Finally, plant life abundance and diversity were measured in both locations as an indicator of transition between marshland types.

== Project success ==
Based on statistical analysis performed on multiple variables described above, the Fritchie Marsh Restoration Project was considered successful in its attempts to restore the area. Prior to construction (1996-2000), a net loss of 126 acres of marshland was documented. Between 2000 and 2004, the land change was +13 acres. The total acreage gained was +0.2%, which is a gain of about 3.3 acres per year. As described in the original proposal, the Fritchie Marsh Restoration Project was to provide a net gain of marshland over a period of 20 years. It would be a slow yet steady gain as depicted from the results described here. The reference area displayed a land change of -6 acres prior to construction (1996-2000) and -4 acres in the years following construction (2000-2004). This was a loss of -1.0% after construction. Clearly, the project area showed signs of improvement, while the reference area continued to lose marshland.

Although the immediate years following the construction of the Fritchie Marsh Restoration Project showed promising signs of improvement, the project did not succeed in continued growth due to Hurricane Katrina and its devastating effects in 2005. As indicated above, postconstruction and pre-Katrina acreage change was +3.3 acres per year. However, between 2004 and 2010 measurements, the land change was -916 acres. This is equivalent to 14.6% of the area being lost at a rate of 152.7 acres per year. The reference area also saw a dramatic decline in its marshland, losing at a rate of 5.2 acres per year (7.4%). Additional analyses performed on satellite imagery of Fritchie Marsh during 2004 and again in 2005 also supported the claim that this devastation was a direct result of Hurricane Katrina.
