= Old Spanish Trail =

Old Spanish Trail may refer to:

- Old Spanish Trail (trade route), connecting Santa Fe, New Mexico, with Los Angeles, California, in the 19th century
- Old Spanish Trail (auto trail), connecting St. Augustine, Florida, with San Diego, California, in the early 20th century
