= Frank Joseph Davis =

Radio and television personality in New Orleans, Louisiana USA

Frank Joseph Davis (1942—2013) was a radio and television personality in New Orleans, Louisiana, distinguished by his tag line "Naturally N'Awlins" that concluded his on-air interviews.

== Career ==
He served New Orleans television station WWL-TV and its radio affiliate WWL-AM, from 1974 until his health-related retirement in 2011. Davis's inaugural broadcast responsibility was a live sportsman's radio talk show, following a brief career with the Louisiana Department of Wildlife and Fisheries. His journalistic style shifted to on-air featured stories and interviews as his subject matter expanded from fishing in southeast Louisiana to the New Orleans Mardi Gras and the cuisine of New Orleans.

His outdoor sportsmen's reports tied together south Louisiana cuisine with the sport of fishing in a way that was said to be pioneering. Davis perennially covered Mardi Gras festivities for local television audiences from a St. Charles Avenue broadcast booth. His death was due to Chronic Inflammatory Demyelinating Polyneuropathy, a rare autoimmune disease.

External images
- Portrait of Frank Joseph Davis
- “Portrait of Davis", as published on FindAGrave

Davis authored several cookbooks and other reference guides to the cuisine of New Orleans and to South Louisiana seafood. His culinary legacy included "bronzing", a toned-down version of blackening. He invented the "Strictly N'Awlins" series of seasonings. Davis's culinary papers were donated to the SoFab Culinary Library and Institute subsequent to his death.

In 2014, the Louisiana State Legislature named the I-10 Twin Span Bridge that links Orleans Parish and St. Tammany Parish over the eastern end of Lake Pontchartrain the "Frank Davis 'Naturally N'Awlins' Memorial Bridge". This is an area where Davis often fished from boats in waters near the bridge.

== Selected books ==
- Frank Davis Makes Good Groceries: A New Orleans Cookbook, Pelican Publishing, 1985, ISBN 1589805364.
- Frank Davis Cooks Naturally N'Awlins, Pelican Publishing, 1990, ISBN 0882897721.
- Frank Davis Cooks Cajun, Creole, and Crescent City, Pelican Publishing, 1994, ISBN 1565540557.
- Fisherman's Tackle Box Bible, Pelican Publishing, 2003, ISBN 9781589801288.
- The Frank Davis Seafood Notebook, Pelican Publishing, 2008, ISBN 0882893092.
