= Greater New Orleans Expressway Commission =

The Greater New Orleans Expressway Commission (GNOEC), commonly called The Causeway Commission, is an entity responsible for the maintenance, construction, and enforcement of safety laws on the Lake Pontchartrain Causeway. It is headquartered in Metairie, a suburb of New Orleans.

The Causeway Commission consists of five commissioners from Jefferson and St. Tammany parishes.

== See also ==
- Greater New Orleans
