= Honey Island Swamp =

Marshland in Louisiana, United States

Coordinates: 30°13′02″N 89°38′59″W

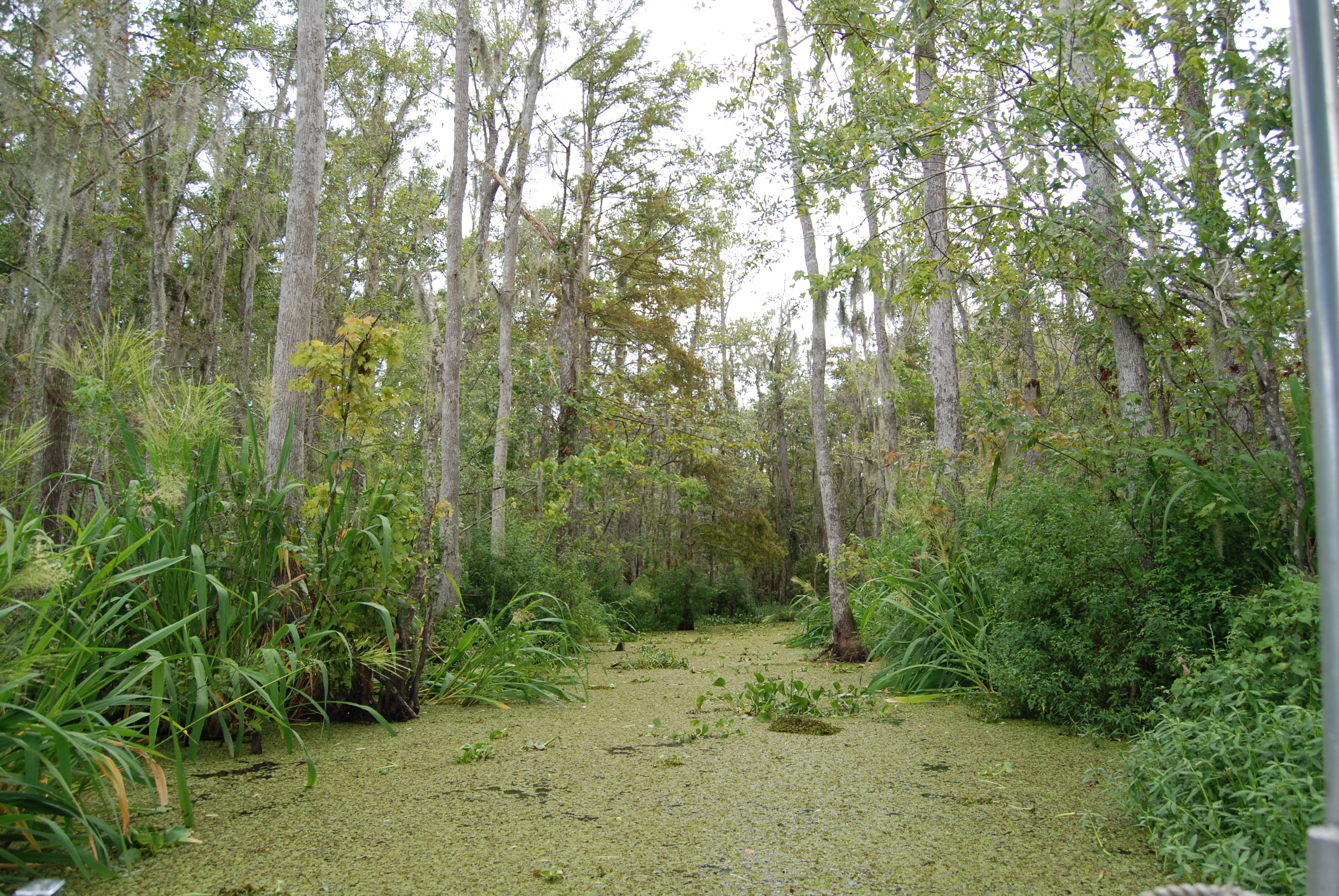
Honey Island Swamp

The Honey Island Swamp (French: Marais de l'Île-de-Miel, Spanish: Pantano de Isla de la Miel) is a marshland located in the eastern portion of the U.S. state of Louisiana in St. Tammany Parish. Honey Island earned its name due to the abundance of honey bees once seen on a nearby isle.

The swamp is bordered on the north by U.S. 11, on the south by Lake Borgne, on the east by the Pearl River and the west by the West Pearl River. The swamp is located within the Pearl River wildlife management area and managed by the Louisiana Department of Wildlife and Fisheries.

It is one of the least-altered river swamps in the United States. Considered by many to be one of the most pristine swampland habitats in the United States, the Honey Island Swamp covers an area that is over 20 miles (32 km) long and nearly seven miles (11 km) across, with 35,619 of its 70,000 acres (280 km^{2}) government sanctioned as permanently protected wildlife area.

== Fauna ==
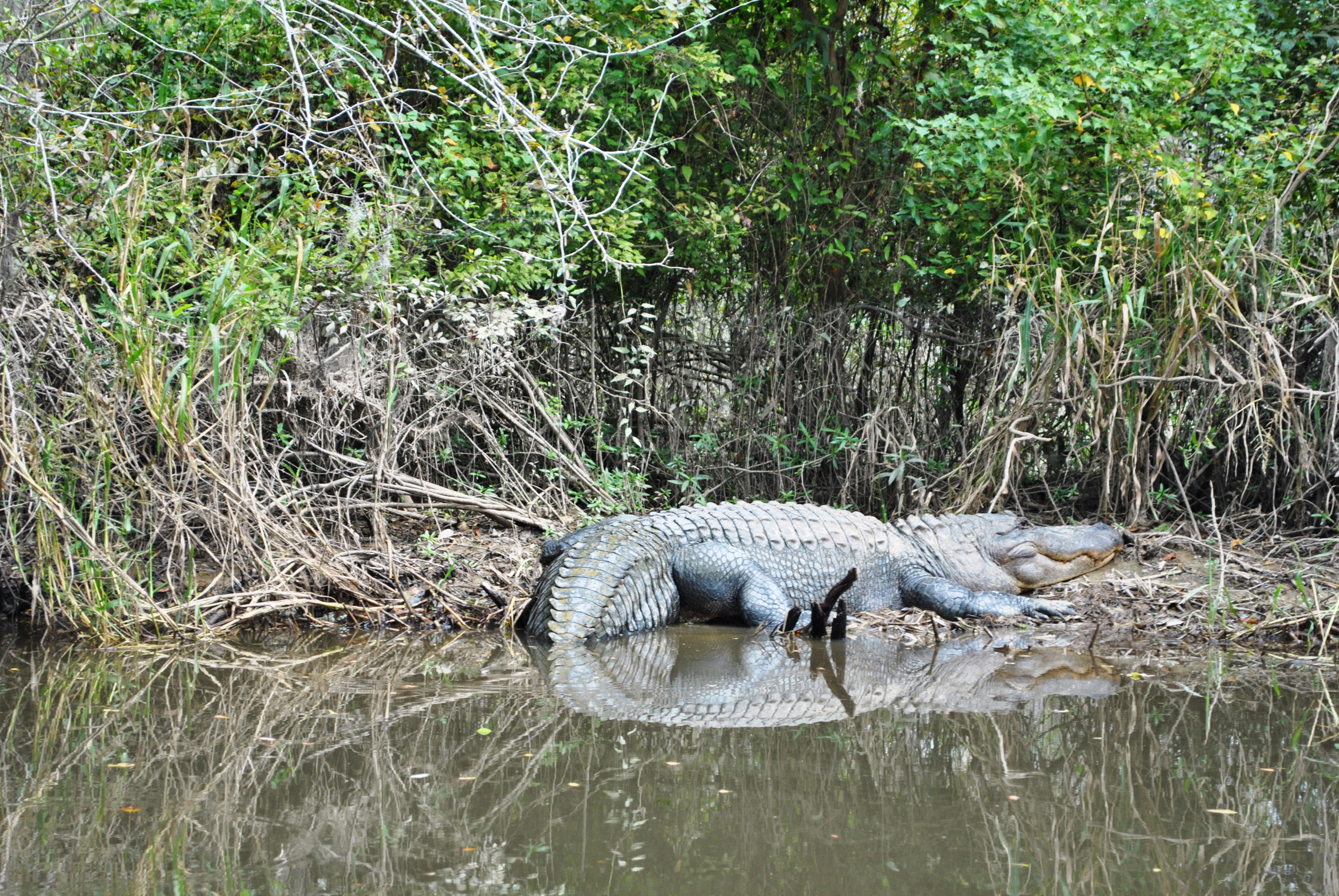
Photo of an American alligator, one of many native reptiles in the swamp

Some native fauna that inhabit the Honey Island Swamp include the American alligator, alligator snapping turtle, red-eared slider, Western cottonmouth, speckled kingsnake, coypu, red fox, Louisiana black bear, bobcat, Virginia opossum, raccoon, muskrat, American mink, brown pelican, barred owl, bald eagle, red-tailed hawk, egretta, great blue heron, alligator gar, largemouth bass, and the paddlefish.

== Swamp Monster ==
The swamp is the purported home of creature described as a large, bipedal, ape-like humanoid similar to descriptions of Bigfoot and the Skunk ape.
