= Norfolk Southern Lake Pontchartrain Bridge =

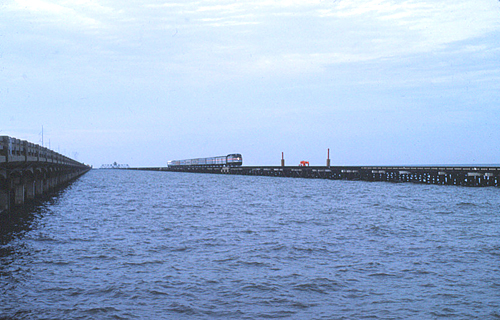
- The northbound Crescent on the bridge in 1984
- Coordinates: 30°11′00″N 89°51′08″W
- Carries: Norfolk Southern NO&NE District
- Crosses: Lake Pontchartrain
- Locale: New Orleans, Louisiana
- Owner: Norfolk Southern Railway
- Maintained by: Norfolk Southern Railway

Characteristics
- Total length: 30,264 ft (9,224 m)

History
- Construction end: 1884

Location
- Interactive map of Norfolk Southern Lake Pontchartrain Bridge

The Norfolk Southern Lake Pontchartrain Bridge is a rolling lift trunnion bridge that carries a single-track of Norfolk Southern rail line over Lake Pontchartrain between Slidell and New Orleans, Louisiana, parallel to the Maestri Bridge At 5.8 miles (9.3 km) long, it is the longest railroad bridge in the United States and the longest rail bridge over water in the world. The bridge is used by Norfolk Southern freight trains, as well as the daily Amtrak Crescent passenger train.

== See also ==
- List of bridges in the United States
- List of longest bridges in the world
