= Old Spanish Trail (auto trail) =

Auto trail across the United States

Old Spanish Trail
- Southern Borderland Trunkline; The Highway of the Southern Borderlands
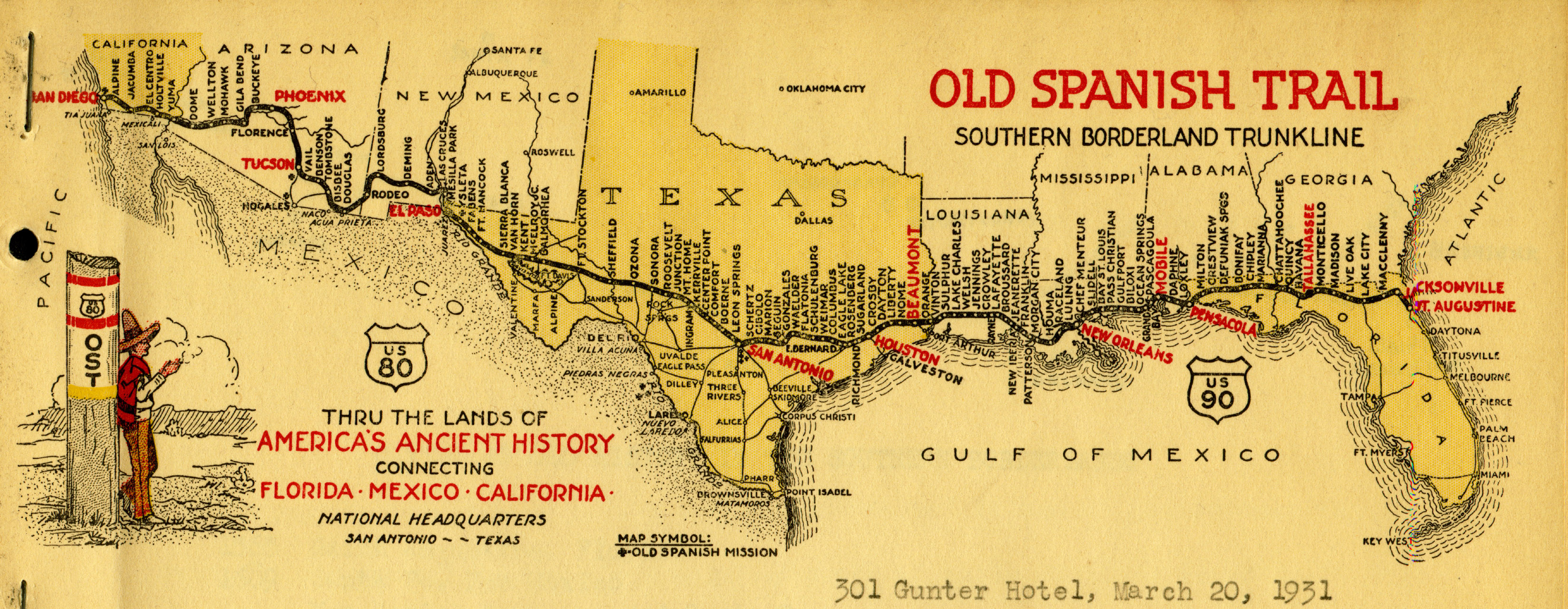

Major junctions
- West end: San Diego, California
- East end: St. Augustine, Florida

Location
- Country: United States
- States: California, Arizona, New Mexico, Texas, Louisiana, Mississippi, Alabama, Florida

Highway system
- Auto trails

The Old Spanish Trail (OST) was an auto trail that once spanned the United States with almost 2,750 miles (4,430 km) of roadway from ocean to ocean. It crossed eight states and 67 counties along the southern border of the United States. Work on the auto highway began in 1915 at a meeting held at The Battle House Hotel in Mobile, Alabama; and, by the 1920s, the trail linked St. Augustine, Florida, to San Diego, California, with its center and headquarters in San Antonio, Texas. The work was overseen at San Antonio and nationally by an executive committee consisting of prominent San Antonio businessmen which met at the Gunter Hotel weekly.

Promoters of the Old Spanish Trail claimed that it followed the route used by "Spanish Conquistadors" 400 years earlier, but there was no continuous trail from Florida to California in Spanish times.

== Archives ==
The archives of the Old Spanish Trail Association are now held in the Special Collections of the Louis J. Blume Library at St. Mary's University in San Antonio. Smaller archives are held at the St. Augustine Historical Society, Jacksonville University, and other archives along the original route.

== Future ==
A decade-long centennial celebration was planned to begin in 2019 and end with a 2029 motorcade from St. Augustine to San Diego. The volunteer Old Spanish Trail Centennial Celebration Association (OST100) is collecting oral histories, travel logs and news articles related to the Old Spanish Trail to conserve the roadways, businesses and historic sites of the original auto highway.

The current work of revitalization, historic preservation, public/private partnerships, restoration, and road enhancements, follows the example of the original promoters of the Old Spanish Trail, who involved diverse business and private interests in building and beautifying the original roadway.

== Route description ==
The historic Old Spanish Trail largely follows what became, in 1927, U.S. Highway 90 (US 90 east of San Antonio and US 80 west of the site of the Interstate 10/Interstate 20 interchange in Reeves County. Between those points, it follows portions of US 87, Texas State Highway 27 (SH 27), and a pre-1991 alignment of US 290. It began at the Huguenot Cemetery in St. Augustine, Florida, and ends at Horton Plaza Park in San Diego, California.

=== Florida ===
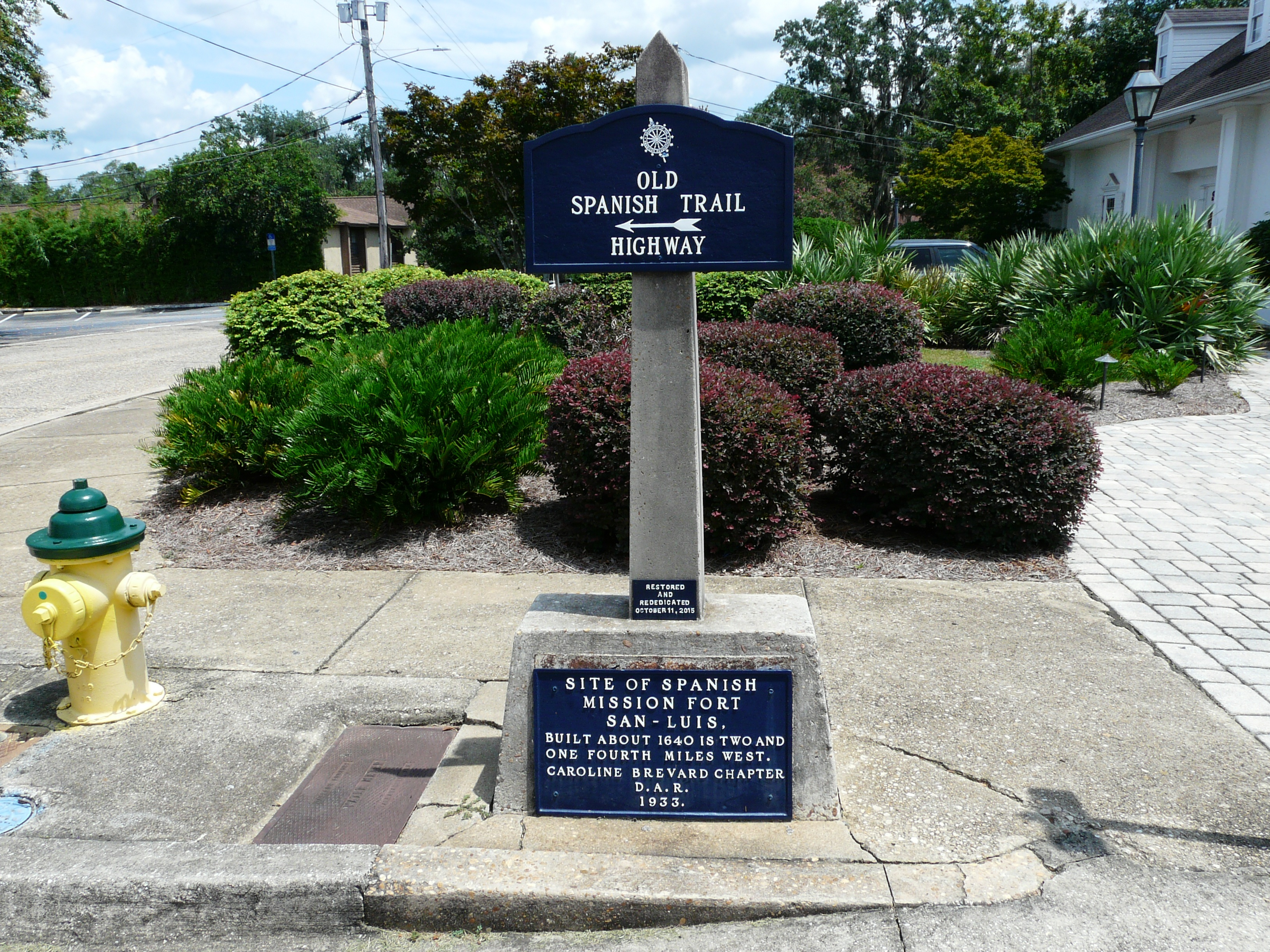
Marker in Tallahassee, Florida

The Old Spanish Trail begins at St. Augustine's Mile Marker Zero of the OST, a large stone marker made of coquina at the Huguenot Cemetery off of San Marcos Avenue. The marker states "Old Spanish Trail Zero Milestone – St. Augustine Fla to San Diego Calif – Erected and dedicated by the exchange club of St. Augustine – A.D. 1928".

From St. Augustine, the trail goes North along San Marcos, US 1's business route, and travels up U.S. Highway 1 to Jacksonville, then turning west, generally follows U.S. Highway 90. Throughout Northern Florida from Jacksonville, the Old Spanish Trail follows either U.S. Highway 90 or local streets that used to be part of US 90, many of which are designated as State Road 10A.

West of Monticello, the OST follows SR-158, SR-154, and Old St. Augustine Road into Tallahassee. The trail enters Tallahassee on Lafayette Street, which once connected directly to Monroe Street but now is cut off by the Apalachee Parkway/US-27. An older route of the Trail went North along Monroe to Brevard Street, then west along Brevard to Bainbridge Road, following Bainbridge to Havana. The trail was later aligned to follow US-27 into Havana, a grade that once carried US-90 as well. From Havana, the trail continues West on Havana Highway/SR 12 to Quincy where it went left onto Madison Street and then right on Jefferson Street to rejoin US-90. At Sneads, the trail follows SR-10A through town and bears left onto a road signed 'Old Spanish Trl'. The trail heads West along this route to State Road 71 and rejoins US-90.

East of Milton, a portion of the OST exists as a red brick road paralleling US 90. Portions of the road are drivable, signed Red Brick Rd. and Old Spanish Trail, heading into a residential area and dead-ending at a tributary to the Blackwater River where it is assumed a bridge once carried traffic into town.

=== Alabama ===
The short trip through Alabama's Mobile Bay region closely follows US-90 with a few exceptions. Between Elsanor and Loxley, the trail traveled through Rosinton prior to the establishment of the U.S. Highway System, and continued West along Alabama County Road 64 to Daphne where a ferry once carried traffic into Mobile.

=== Mississippi ===
In Mississippi, the OST travels along US-90 until Pass Christian where it turned right to head North on Henderson Ave to De Lisle, then West along Kiln Delisle Road to Kiln. At Kiln, the OST continued West to the ghost-town of Logtown, Mississippi, although the road connecting those two towns has been partially lost to the Bayou. That route likely consisted of portions of the Bayou La Croix Road, Rifle Range Road, an unmarked road once called the Bay St. Louis Road, which now closely parallels a portion of Mississippi Highway 607, and Mississippi Highway 604, then continued West along Logtown Road into town. In Logtown, a ferry carried traffic across the Pearl River to land at Indian Village in Louisiana.

=== Louisiana ===
The Louisiana section of the trail includes the Huey P. Long Bridge and various other historical sites along a path that roughly follows U.S. Route 90 in Louisiana, replacing what had been Louisiana Route 2.

Getting off the ferry at Indian Village, The Old Spanish Trail continues along Indian Village Road to what is now U.S. Highway 190 where it comes into Slidell, Louisiana. South of Slidell at North Shore, another ferry once carried autos to Chef Menteur at which point the trail followed Gentilly Road into New Orleans. Today, traffic on the OST follows Louisiana Highway 433 south to US-90 which travels Southwest to connect with Gentilly Road. From Gentilly Boulevard, the trail took a left at Bruxelles Street, now cutoff from Gentilly, and then bears onto North Broad Avenue, takes a left on Canal Street, a right on St. Charles Avenue, and then another left on Walnut Street to the now long-gone Walnut Street Ferry. The Ferry dropped autos off at Westwego, where the trail turned onto River Road, took a left on Seven Oaks Boulevard (formerly Bridge City Avenue), and bore back onto River Road. In Luling, the trail turns left onto Paul Mailard Road and bears right onto to what is now Louisiana Highway 631, still cosigned Old Spanish Trail.

Between the US-90 offramp Northeast of Raceland and Lafayette, much of Louisiana Highway 182 carries the old trail; portions of that route still retain Old Spanish Trail signage.

By the 1930s, the OST had been re-routed to follow US-90 as it existed at the time, including the use of the Huey P. Long Bridge to cross the Mississippi river out of New Orleans.

=== Texas ===
In eastern Texas the Old Spanish Trail can still be seen in many places. The trail runs alongside Interstate 10 through Orange and Vidor; when the trail reaches the Neches River, it merges with Interstate 10 crossing the Purple Heart Bridge, then detours through Downtown Beaumont. While in downtown the trail meets College Street and goes directly west from there to Liberty.

The trail enters Houston on Navigation and turns down Main Street, exiting the city as U.S. Route 90 Alternate. On the way, it passes Rice University, University of Houston, and the Astrodome. "Old Spanish Trail" is the official name for the street that follows the route from Interstate 45 south of downtown Houston until it merges with South Main Street in the Texas Medical Center.

At Eagle Lake, the trail heads Northwest along FM102, a pre-1958 alignment of U.S. 90A, where it rejoins present day U.S. 90 in Alleyton. At Waelder, the trail again departs U.S. 90, heading down Texas State Highway 97 into Gonzales and heading along U.S. 90A into Seguin. At Seguin, the OST heads towards San Antonio along a road at various points signed Seguin Road, FM78, San Antonio Street, and John E Peterson Boulevard. In San Antonio, the OST once traveled along Seguin Road directly to New Braunfels Avenue, turning south towards Houston Street, then West along Houston Street into town. Today, a portion of the Seguin Road grade is buried under I-35.

San Antonio contains several reminders of the Old Spanish Trail's existence. On the grounds of City Hall can be found a Zero Milestone marker dedicated by Governor Pat Neff on March 27, 1924. The OST headquarters once resided within the Gunter Hotel, now called the Sheraton Gunter Hotel. At the corner of Fredericksburg, which carries the trail out of town westward, and Vance Jackson Road, a marker of the Old Spanish Trail placed by the Daughters of the Republic of Texas in 1936 still stands. A few blocks Northwest of the marker lies a park named 'Old Spanish Walking Trails'. The trail continues North along Fredericksburg where it joins U.S. Highway 87 and I-10.

At Leon Springs, The Old Spanish Trail departs the highway and travels North along Boerne Stage Road. At the Bexar-Kendall County line, the remains of a stone county line OST marker can be seen on the Eastern side, just north of the bridge over Balcones Creek.

An alternate 'Tourist Route' leaves San Antonio along Bandera Road, signed SH-16. Bandera is home to the O.S.T. Restaurant, which has served travelers of the Old Spanish Trail since 1921. Outside Bandera, the trail continues north along SH-173 where it rejoins the main portion of the trail in Kerrville.

A portion of the trail remains as a segment of U.S. Route 290 west of Ozona, Texas in Crockett and Pecos Counties. This scenic loop includes the descent of Lancaster Hill, a crossing of the Pecos River at an old iron bridge, and passes through the small community of Sheffield before rejoining Interstate 10. In Sheffield on the northern side of the road near the Avenue E intersection, an old neon sign reads "OST Courts", although the Courts themselves are gone.

=== New Mexico ===
The OST continues primarily along the old grade of Historic US 80 in New Mexico from Anthony to Rodeo, leaving the state along New Mexico State Road 80.

In 1924, the trail from Las Cruces went to Mesilla and then crossed the Rio Grande at the Mesilla Dam along County Road B006. That road once ran directly to Aden, New Mexico, and can still faintly be seen on aerial and satellite maps; it is no longer used or maintained. From Aden, the trail traveled northwest parallel to the Southern Pacific Railroad through Cambray and then approximately followed what is today New Mexico State Road 549 to Deming.

=== Arizona ===
The OST crosses the state mostly along historic portions of old US 80 signed Arizona State Route 80, entering Arizona southwest of Rodeo and exiting the state by crossing the Colorado River north of Yuma. One exception to the US-80 route is at Ligurta, where the OST followed the Butterfield Stage Route up to Dome, then South down US-95 to reconnect with the US-80 route.

=== California ===
Driving West, the old road continues to follow US 80 to Boulevard and then diverts onto Campo Road, cosigned California State Route 94. In Spring Valley, the trail diverges from 94 and continues along Campo Road to Lemon Grove, where it turns left and travels down Lemon Grove Avenue, which becomes Imperial Avenue into San Diego.

By 1931 the Old Spanish Trail had been re-routed to travel along US 80, west of Boulevard, paralleling I-8 as Old Highway 80, which becomes El Cajon Blvd further west. In San Diego, the trail turns left at Park Blvd and heads downtown.

The Western terminus of the Old Spanish Trail can be found at Horton Plaza Park in San Diego on Broadway and 4th. Here, a marble column called the Pacific Milestone once marked the end of the trail. It read, "Pacific Milestone dedicated by our beloved President Calvin Coolidge Nov 17, 1923". In addition to the OST, the Pacific Milestone also marked the end of the Lee Highway, named for Confederate General Robert E. Lee, a highway that connected San Diego to New York City. Due to its association with Lee and public unrest across the United States regarding monuments bearing the names of individuals associated with the Confederacy, the milestone was removed by the San Diego Department of Parks & Recreation on June 12th, 2020.
