= Louisiana Highway 433 =

State highway in Louisiana, United States

Louisiana Highway 433

Route information
- Maintained by Louisiana DOTD
- Length: 14.8 mi (23.8 km)

Major junctions
- West end: US 190 west of Slidell
- US 11 in Slidell; I-10 in Slidell
- East end: US 90 east of Slidell

Location
- Country: United States
- State: Louisiana
- Parishes: St. Tammany

Highway system
- Louisiana State Highway System; Interstate; US; State; Scenic
← LA 432	→ LA 434

Louisiana Highway 433 (LA 433) is a state highway in Louisiana that serves St. Tammany Parish. It spans 14.8 miles (23.8 km) in a west to east direction. It is known at various points as Thompson Road, Bayou Liberty Road, Pontchartrain Drive, Old Spanish Trail, and Rigolets Road.

== Route description ==
From the west, LA 433 begins at a junction with U.S. Route 190 (US 190) near the North Shore Square mall and heads south. At this point, the roadway is also known as Thompson Road. After about two miles (3.2 km), the road crosses Bayou Liberty and turns eastward, becoming Bayou Liberty Road. As the road nears downtown Slidell, it crosses Bayou Bonfouca via a drawbridge and becomes a four-lane divided highway. Shortly thereafter, the road joins US 11 and heads southward for about a quarter of a mile before departing eastward along the Old Spanish Trail. LA 433 then intersects Interstate 10 via a diamond interchange (exit 263). Afterward it narrows to two lanes and winds through the swamps of southeast St. Tammany Parish. Heading southeastward, the highway is duly known as Rigolets Road and the Old Spanish Trail at this point. LA 433 ends at a junction with US 90 just north of the Rigolets.

LA 433 is an undivided, two-lane highway from US 190 to US 11. The route then widens to an undivided, five-lane roadway (with a middle turning lane) while concurrent with US 11. LA 433 narrows slightly to a divided, four-lane road from US 11 to just east of I-10. From just east of I-10 to its terminus at US 90, LA 433 is an undivided, two-lane highway.

== Major junctions ==
The entire highway is in St. Tammany Parish.

Location	mi	km	Destinations	Notes
	0.0	0.0	US 190 (Gause Boulevard West)	
Slidell	6.4	10.3	US 11 (Front Street)	West end of US 11 overlap
Slidell	6.7	10.8	US 11 (Pontchartrain Drive)	East end of US 11 overlap
Slidell	8.4– 8.6	13.5– 13.8	I-10 – New Orleans, Bay. St. Louis, MS	Exit 263 (I-10)
	14.8	23.8	US 90 / South 5th Street	
1.000 mi = 1.609 km; 1.000 km = 0.621 mi: Concurrency terminus
