= Pearl River Wildlife Management Area =

Protected area in Mississippi, United States

- Pearl River WMA
- IUCN category V (protected landscape/seascape)
- Location within Louisiana
- Location: St. Tammany Parish, Louisiana
- Coordinates: 30°18′30″N 89°40′19″W
- Area: 35,619 acres (144.14 km^{2})
- Governing body: Louisiana Department of Wildlife and Fisheries

Pearl River WMA

Pearl River Wildlife Management Area, also known as Pearl River WMA, is a 35,619 acres (14,414 ha) tract of protected area near Slidell in St. Tammany Parish, Louisiana, in the United States. The WMA is managed by the Louisiana Department of Wildlife and Fisheries (LDWF)

== Location ==
Pearl River WMA is located six miles east of Slidell and one mile from Pearl River. The WMA is bordered on the north by the Bogue Chitto National Wildlife Refuge. The eastern boundary is the Pearl River and the Louisiana Mississippi line. The southern boundary is the Little Lake Pass, across West Middle River, North Pass, and the east mouth of the Old Pearl River. The western boundary is the Old Pearl River.

== Lower Pearl Partnership ==
In 2002 the Lower Pearl Partnership was formed between the Louisiana and Mississippi chapters of the Nature Conservancy, the Mississippi Department of Environmental Quality, and the Louisiana Department of Environmental Quality, to address issues and concerns along the Lower Pearl River to "restore, preserve, and protect the ecological integrity of the Pearl River and its watershed". The conservancy helped acquire 22,765 acres of the Bogue Chitto National Wildlife Refuge that connected it to the WMA on the north side.

=== Wildlife ===
There are several species of wildlife that are on the threatened or endangered species list, resulting from the Endangered Species Act of 1973, in the Pearl River basin and Pearl River WMA. The ringed map turtle, also called the ringed sawback (Graptemys oculifera), was designated threatened in 1986, is only found in the Pearl River basin. The alligator snapping turtle (Macrochelys temminckii) designated threatened in 2006. The Pearl River map turtle, thought to be the Pascagoula map turtle (Graptemys gibbonsi) until 2010, but was found to be a separate species endemic to the Pearl River basin. The diamondback terrapin (Malaclemys terrapin pileata), considered a "species of concern". In 2005 twenty-seven pairs of swallow-tailed kite (Elanoides forficatus) were observed in the basin. The kite is not federally protected but the United States Fish and Wildlife Service considers the bird a "Species-at-Risk". The Gulf sturgeon (Acipenser oxyrinchus desotoi) listed in 1991. The inflated heelsplitter mussel (Potamilus inflatus), was listed in 2006. The bald eagle (Haliaeetus leucocephalus), the dusky gopher frog (Rana capito sevosa or Lithobates sevosus), the gopher tortoise (Gopherus polyphemus), and the Louisiana black bear (Ursus americanus luteolus).

Other wildlife include the white-tailed deer, rabbit, squirrel, wild turkey lottery hunts, waterfowl, snipe, and woodcock. Trapping includes beaver, nutria, mink, muskrat, opossum, raccoon, coyote, and bobcat.

== Endangered flora ==
Louisiana quillwort (Isoetes louisianensis), found in Washington and St. Tammany parishes, was classified as an endangered species in 1992. The species was identified on several creeks and bayous in Washington and St. Tammany Parish, in the Pearl River basin, including the Bogue Chitto National Wildlife Refuge and the Pearl River WMA.
