= I-10 Twin Span Bridge =

Bridge in Louisiana

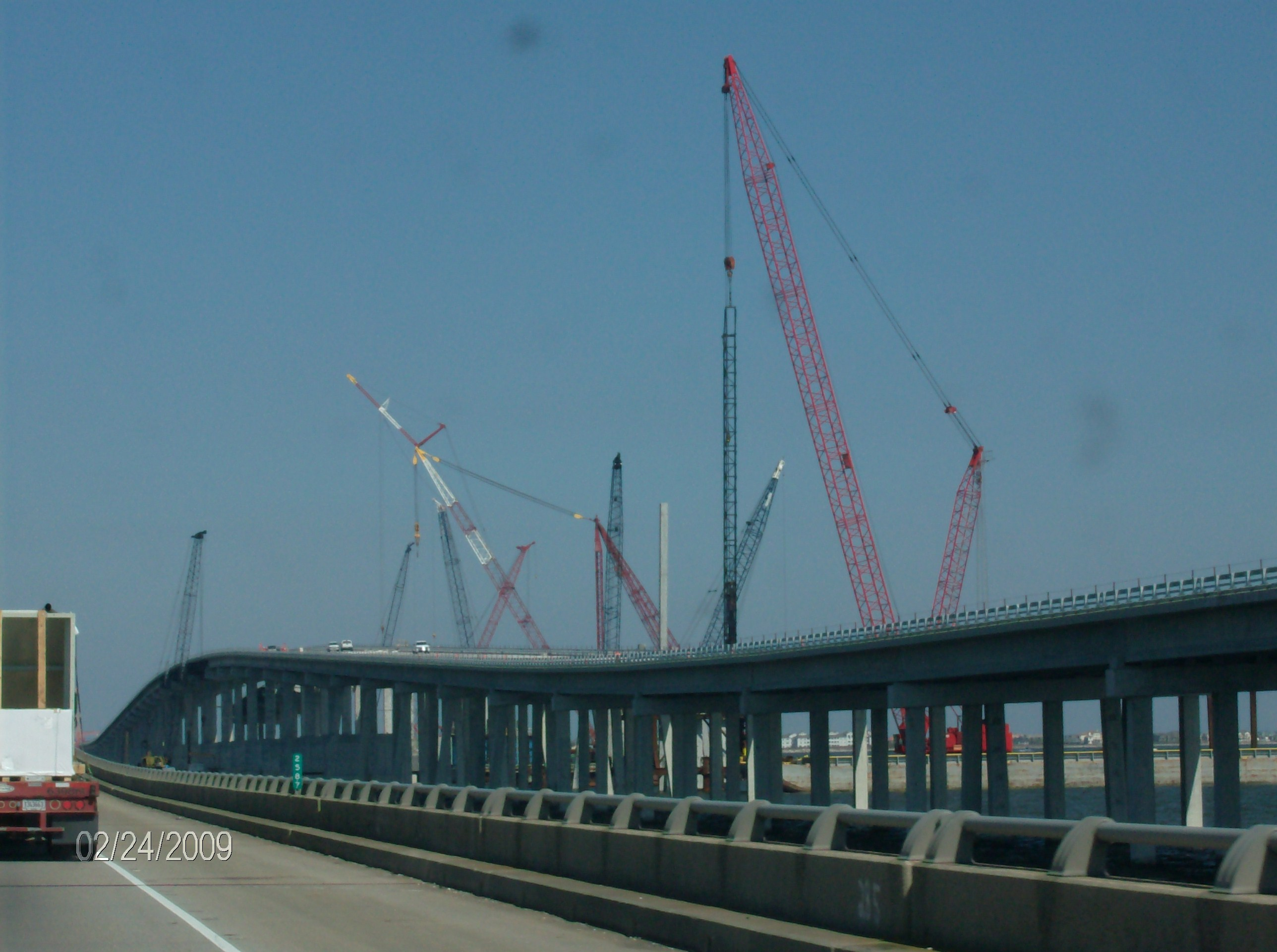
- The high-rise portion under construction near the North Shore of Lake Pontchartrain, February 2009, with the old eastbound span also visible
- Coordinates: 30°10′58″N 89°49′29″W
- Carries: 6 lanes of I-10
- Crosses: Lake Pontchartrain
- Locale: New Orleans and Slidell, Louisiana, U.S.A.
- Official name: Frank Davis Memorial Bridge
- Maintained by: LA DOTD

Characteristics
- Total length: 29,039 feet (8,851 m)
- Width: 60 feet (18 m) each span
- Clearance below: 30 feet (9.1 m) and 80-foot (24 m) at the high rise section

History
- Opened: July 9, 2009 (current eastbound); April 7, 2010 (current westbound); September 9, 2011 (current completed)

Statistics
- Daily traffic: 55,000

Location
- Interactive map of I-10 Twin Span Bridge

The I-10 Twin Span Bridge, officially known as the Frank Davis "Naturally N'Awlins" Memorial Bridge, is a nearly 5.5-mile (8.9 km) causeway near New Orleans. It consists of two parallel trestle bridges. These parallel bridges cross the eastern end of Lake Pontchartrain in southern Louisiana from New Orleans to Slidell. The current bridge spans were constructed in the second half of the 2000s after the original bridges were extensively damaged by Hurricane Katrina on August 29, 2005. The first span opened to eastbound traffic on July 9, 2009. On April 7, 2010, the second span was opened to traffic and the old twin spans were permanently closed to traffic.

The approaches to the westbound lanes were completed with a ribbon-cutting ceremony on September 8, 2011, and the opening of all six lanes the next morning. The original Twin Span bridges were demolished shortly after the replacement spans opened. A short portion remains in use as a public fishing pier in Slidell. The debris from the demolition was used to line the nearby lake bottom as an underwater reef.

On August 1, 2014, the bridge was officially named the Frank Davis "Naturally N'Awlins" Memorial Bridge to honor the former WWL-TV News personality Frank Joseph Davis (1942–2013) who often fished near the bridge.

== Original Twin Span (1965–2010) ==
The original bridges were opened at a short ceremony on December 21, 1965 and were each constructed with 433 65-foot concrete segments. Each span was two lanes wide, and they had a clearance of 8.5 feet (2.6 m) for most of the bridge, with a 65 feet (20 m) clearance at the navigational channel section.

=== Hurricane Katrina ===
After Hurricane Katrina on August 29, 2005, the old Twin Spans suffered extensive damage, as the rising storm surge pulled or shifted bridge segments off their piers. The eastbound span was missing 38 segments with another 170 misaligned, while the westbound span was missing 26 segments with 265 misaligned. The damage to the Twin Spans and to U.S. Route 90 to the east left only one route into New Orleans from the east, the U.S. Route 11 bridge just west of the Twin Spans. The Louisiana Department of Transportation & Development (DOTD) accepted a bid of $30.9 million from Boh Brothers Construction Company on September 9, 2005, to reconstruct the bridges, starting with the less damaged westbound span. Phase 1 of the project was to reestablish two-way traffic on the eastbound span within 45 days.

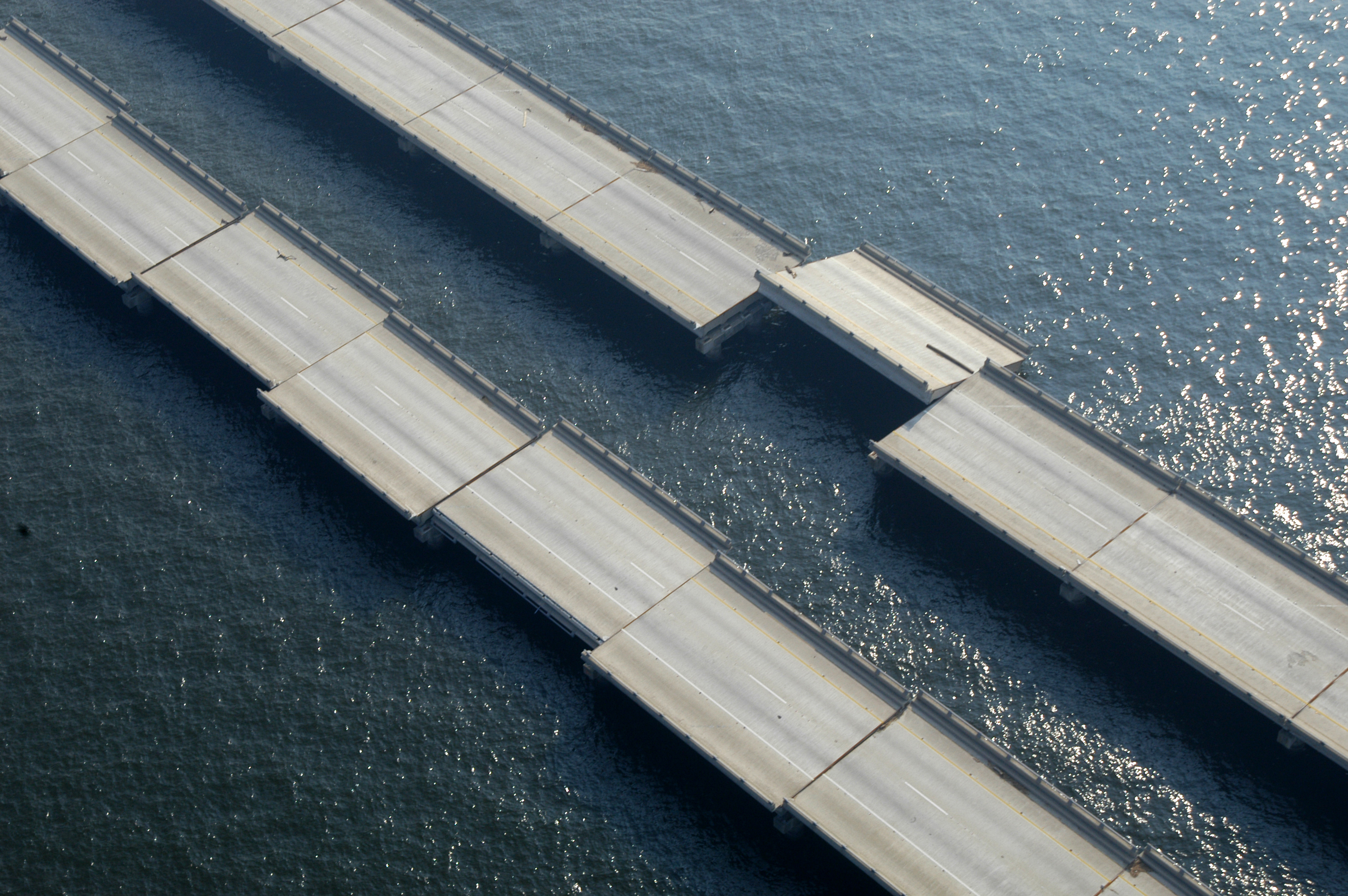
I-10 damage of old bridges over Lake Pontchartrain.

Scavenged bridge segments from the westbound span were used to fill in the gaps in the eastbound span. On October 10, 2005, the east span was reopened to traffic with one lane in each direction. The original contract planned for 43 days - the contractor completed the project 15 days ahead of schedule and was awarded a bonus of $1.1 million. Phase 2 of the project was occurring concurrently with Phase 1 and involved repairs to the westbound span. Prefabricated steel bridge spans were used on the westbound bridge in two areas to replace destroyed segments and segments used on the eastbound span. The west span reopened on January 6, 2006, returning four lanes of traffic to flow once again. Due to the prefabricated steel segments, there were both a 45-mile (72 km)-per-hour speed limit and weight restrictions on the westbound span. Additionally, the span was closed periodically for maintenance work, which is covered by Phase 3 of the original contract.

== Current Twin Span (2009–present) ==
Following the extensive damages from Hurricane Katrina, it was decided that the old Twin Spans were too vulnerable to storm surge and that the long-term solution would be to construct two new taller spans. Ground was broken on July 13, 2006, on the project, which constructed two new bridges 300 feet (91 m) east of the old spans. This $803 million project constructed two three-lane bridges 30 feet (9.1 m) above the surface of Lake Pontchartrain, with an 80-foot (24 m) high rise near Slidell. Each span is 60 feet (18 m) wide, consisting of three 12-foot (3.7 m) lanes, and 12-foot (3.7 m) shoulders on each side.

The wider bridges eliminated the bottlenecking that occurred at both ends of the old bridges and also are able to accommodate 50 percent more traffic than the old twin spans, according to the Louisiana Department of Transportation and Development. The current bridges also feature traffic cameras and electronic message boards to alert motorists of any potential problems on the bridge, much like the Lake Pontchartrain Causeway bridge.

The original twin span bridges were demolished following the opening of the new bridges. A small portion of the original twin span bridges near the northern end were preserved, and are now used as a fishing pier.

=== Construction accident ===
On October 30, 2008, as construction workers were preparing a form for a concrete pour, a girder collapsed sending 10 workers plunging into Lake Pontchartrain approximately 30 feet (9.1 m) below. One of the workers, Eric Troy Blackmon, who was tethered to the girder, died in the accident.

== See also ==
- List of bridges in the United States
- List of longest bridges
