= Maestri Bridge =

- Coordinates: 30°11′14″N 89°50′35″W
- Carries: 2 lanes of US 11
- Crosses: Lake Pontchartrain
- Locale: New Orleans and Slidell, Louisiana, United States
- Maintained by: LA DOTD

Characteristics
- Total length: 4.78 miles (8 km)
- Width: 35 feet (11 m)

History
- Opened: February 18, 1928; 98 years ago

Location
- Interactive map of Maestri Bridge

The Maestri Bridge (originally known as the Pontchartrain Bridge and later as the Watson-Williams Pontchartrain Bridge and the Five Mile Bridge) carries U.S. Route 11 (US 11) across Lake Pontchartrain between New Orleans and Slidell, Louisiana, in the United States. The 4.78-mile (7.69 km) bridge was the longest concrete bridge in the world upon completion. It is 35 feet (11 m) wide and has two bascule-type draw spans for passing vessels and barges.

== History ==
The bridge opened on February 18, 1928, as the first permanent crossing of Lake Pontchartrain. The New Orleans Stock Exchange was closed on the day of the opening, a Saturday, to allow members to attend the opening.

The bridge was originally a toll structure, costing $1.25 for a motor vehicle with one driver plus ten cents for each additional passenger. Louisiana Governor Huey Long was opposed to toll bridges and offered to have the state purchase the bridge from its private owners. The offer was rejected, so Long constructed two free bridges to the east along U.S. Route 90 (US 90) across Chef Menteur Pass and the Rigolets Pass. With a free alternative, the toll bridge faced financial ruin and was sold to the state in 1938 for $940,000. Following the purchase, the bridge's name was changed to the Maestri Bridge in honor of Robert Maestri, the mayor of New Orleans from 1936 to 1946. US 11, formerly cosigned with US 90 across the Chef Menteur and Rigolets Bridges, was rerouted onto the Maestri Bridge around 1941.

In 2005, Hurricane Katrina virtually destroyed the I-10 Twin Span Bridge to the east. However, due to its sturdy construction, the Maestri Bridge was largely undamaged and was the only route to New Orleans from the East until the Twin Spans could be temporarily fixed, as US 90 was also closed due to damage to the Fort Pike Bridge.

The bridge was closed in January 2012 for repairs. LA DOTD awarded a $5.7 million contract to rehabilitate the bridge's railings. It reopened on May 21. It was closed once more in January 2019 as part of a $28.6 million overhaul to the bridge.

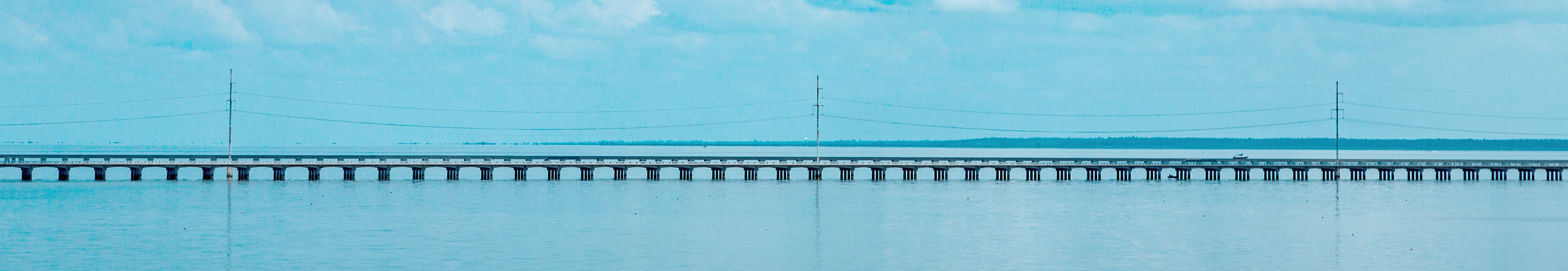
The Maestri Bridge viewed from Interstate 10

== See also ==
- List of bridges in the United States
- List of longest bridges
