= Atchafalaya =

The word Atchafalaya derives from the Choctaw term hacha falaia, meaning "long river".

Atchafalaya may refer to:

- Atchafalaya, Louisiana, Ghost town in Louisiana, U.S.
- Atchafalaya River, Louisiana, U.S.
  - Atchafalaya Basin or Atchafalaya Swamp, wetlands surrounding the lower part of the Atchafalaya River, Louisiana
    - Atchafalaya Basin Bridge
    - Atchafalaya Swamp Freeway, a portion of Interstate 10 in Louisiana that includes the bridge
  - Atchafalaya National Heritage Area
  - Atchafalaya National Wildlife Refuge
- Atchafalaya Golf Course at Idlewild, Patterson, Louisiana
- A song from the album Sylva, by jazz ensemble Snarky Puppy
