= Sherburne Complex Wildlife Management Area =

Wildlife Management Area in Louisiana

Sherburne Complex
- IUCN category IV (habitat/species management area)
- Location within Louisiana
- Location: Iberville / St. Martin Parishes, Louisiana
- Nearest city: Krotz Springs, Louisiana
- Coordinates: 30°29′00″N 91°44′00″W
- Area: 43,637 acres (17,659 ha)
- Established: 1996
- Governing body: Louisiana Department of Wildlife and Fisheries, U.S. Fish and Wildlife Service, U.S. Army Corps of Engineers
- Website: Sherburne Complex Wildlife Management Area

Sherburne WMA

The Sherburne Complex (Sherburn is a joint land management venture of the U.S. Fish and Wildlife Service, the Louisiana Department of Wildlife and Fisheries (LDWF), and the U.S. Army Corps of Engineers that began in 1983. The area consists of 43,637 acres (17,659 ha), and is managed by the Louisiana Department of Wildlife and Fisheries. The complex is located in the Morganza Flood way system of the Atchafalaya Basin about 30 miles (48 km) west of Baton Rouge, Louisiana and actually extends a little south of the I-10 Atchafalaya Basin Bridge at Whiskey Bay, Louisiana. The bridge crosses the Whiskey Bay Pilot Channel. Located on the graveled LA 975, the west boundary is on the east side of the Atchafalaya River with the east boundary being the East Protection Levee. The complex stretches just north of old highway 190, and a short distance to the south of I-10. The nearest town is Krotz Springs to the north of US 190.

== History ==
The Atchafalaya Basin is in the Lower Mississippi River area of the Mississippi River Delta. The culmination of events that eventually led to the existence of wildlife management areas in the Basin in general and the Shereburne Complex in particular began after the Great Flood of 1844 and 1851. The Great Flood of 1927 prompted the Louisiana Legislature to pass several flood control bills, including the Flood Control Act of 1928, as well as Mississippi River & Tributaries (MR&T) Project. The result was the Atchafalaya Basin Floodway system, channelization (Whiskey Bay cutoff), and bank stabilization projects. During the 1930s and 1940s extensive dredging was performed on the Atchafalaya. In 1954, after the Great Flood of 1951, major dredging was resumed by the Corps. In 1963 the Old River control structure was built to prevent the capture of the Mississippi by the Atchafalaya. In 1968, because of environmental concerns as well as a lack of funds, dredging was discontinued. In 1972 the Louisiana Legislature enacted act 365 that established the Atchfalaya Basin Division, within the Department of Public Works. The Corps was directed to develop a plan for the Atchafalaya Basin which was completed in 1982 and became the Atchafalaya Basin Floodway System Project (ABFS). In 1983, 10,232 acres (41.41 km^{2}) were purchased by the state for the creation of the Sherburne Wildlife Management Area. In 1985, Louisiana Public Law 99-88 was enacted to authorize a multipurpose plan.

=== State authorization ===
In 1986, the United States Congress approved $250,000.000 towards the creation of the Atchafalaya Basin Program and Louisiana Public Law 99-662, section 906, stated the plan to be of National interests. Governor Foster appointed the Louisiana Department of Natural Resources to work with the Corps of Engineers to produce the "Atchafalaya Basin Master Plan" for the development of the basin. In 1988 a plan was implemented and the current alliance was formed (Section 4.41-B of the Master Plan) creating the Sherburne Complex.

== Sherburne Complex ==
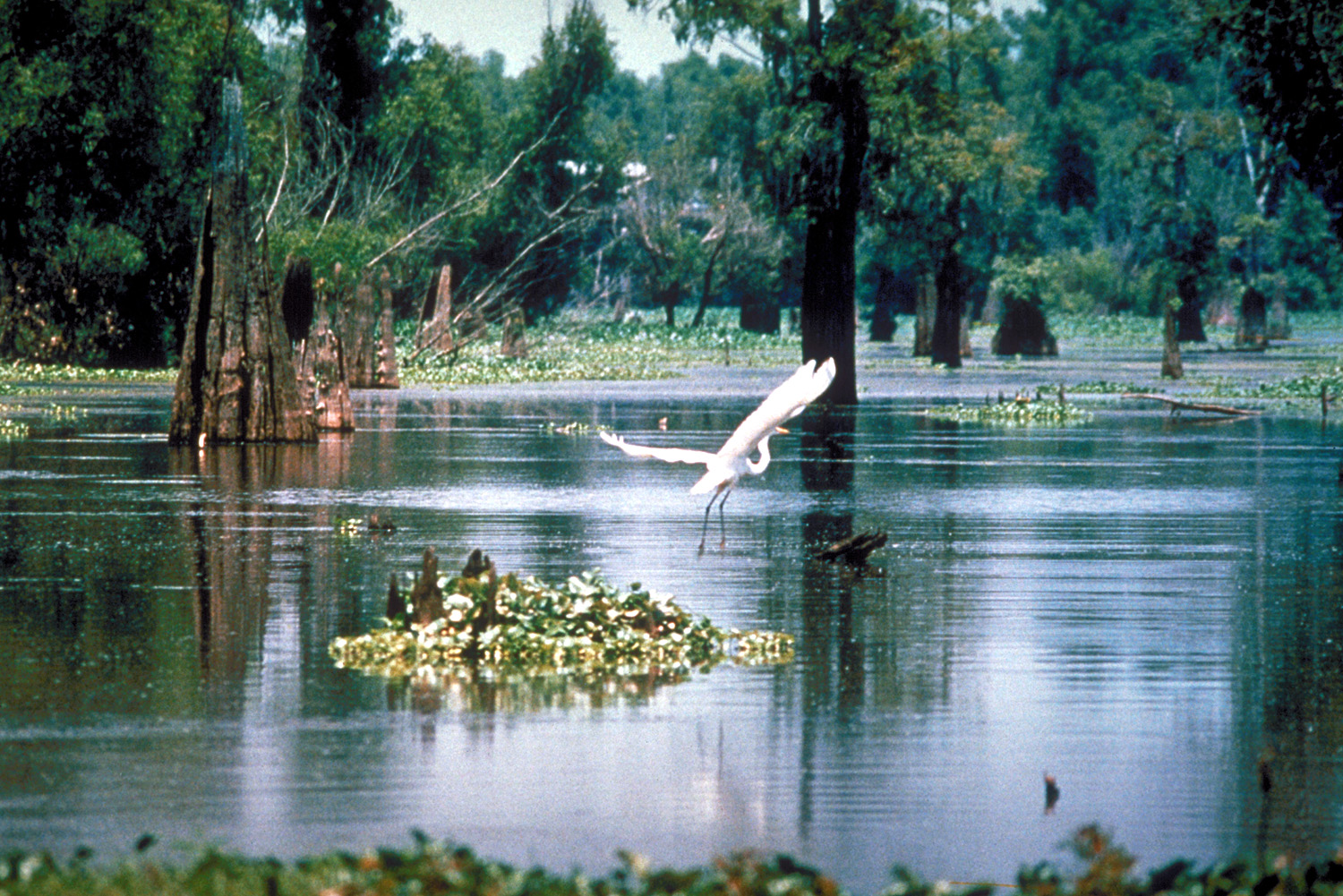
Atchafalaya Basin, Louisiana

The Sherburne Complex combines the Sherburne Wildlife Management Area (WMA), Atchafalaya National Wildlife Refuge, and the U.S. Army Corps of Engineers' Bayou Des Ourses (Bayou of the Bears), with the intent of conservation and management of all fish and wildlife within the boundaries of the complex. The entire area is classified as "bottomland hardwoods". The area contains swamps, overflow lakes, and many bayous. This provides opportunities for scientific research, environmental education, and fish- and wildlife-oriented recreation. The three combined areas offer ATV trails, two campgrounds, a shooting range and boat launches. There is also a 17-mile (27 km) marked paddling trail that lets visitors tour the bayou without a guide. Recreations also includes birding and nature watching, hunting, fishing, trapping, camping, and nature photography, all complemented by all-weather roads.

=== Sherburne WMA ===
11,780 acres (47.7 km^{2}) are owned by The Louisiana Department of Wildlife and Fisheries. The headquarters is located 3 miles (4.8 km) south of Krotz Springs on LA 975 in Pointe Coupee Parish, 15 miles (24 km) north of I-10. The office is the site of the Sherburne ghost town, which was a logging town from the 1880s to the 1930s, and ceased to exist after the timber was exhausted.

=== Atchafalaya National Wildlife Refuge ===
An area of 15,220 acres (61.6 km^{2}), set aside as a National Wildlife Refuge, established in 1986, is part of the complex. Atchafalaya is a Choctaw Native American word: hacha for river and falaia for long, or "long river". All persons older than 16 or younger than 60 using wildlife management areas in the state of Louisiana, including the refuge, for any reason other than just traveling LA 975 must purchase a Wild Louisiana Stamp, hunting, or fishing license, or pay a daily charge of $2.00.

=== Bayou Des Ourses ===
An area of 17,000 acres (69 km^{2}) is owned by the U.S. Army Corps of Engineers. The name means Bayou of the Bears and is across the Atchafalaya River from 28,500 acres (115 km^{2}) of Corps land called Indian Bayou. The area also includes the South Farm Unit.

== Atchafalaya Basin ==
The combined area of the Sherburne Complex is part of the Atchafalaya Basin, the nation's largest river swamp, containing almost one million acres (4,000 km^{2}). The basin begins near Simmesport and stretches some 140 miles (230 km) southward to the Gulf of Mexico. Currently, the Atchafalaya Basin is bound by natural ridges formed by levee building along active and abandoned courses of the Mississippi River. Around 60 species of reptiles and amphibians, along with over 250 species of birds, including the American bald eagle and the peregrine falcon, can be found in this productive region. Many types of animal life and nearly 100 different species of fish and aquatic life can also be found in the basin.

== Oil and gas ==
There are extensive gas pipe lines with names such as Gulf Central Pipeline, Dixie Pipeline, Dow Pipeline, Gas Gathering Pipeline, as well as Oil wells located in the area.

=== Controversy ===
Since 2001 and the controversy over road tree right-of-way clear cutting for oil wells, many agencies and organizations give input, oversight, and management assistance to the Louisiana Department of Wildlife and Fisheries concerning the protection and future of the complex. Right of way clearings for a new road to allow access to oil wells allowed cutting of kite nesting trees at the height of Neotropical migrant breeding season. The results, including a meeting at the Sherburne WMA headquarters August 14, 2001, resulted in many changes in the policies of the complex including that there will be no further implementation of forestry prescriptions during the breeding season. The Louisiana Natural Heritage Program, within the LDWF, is part of the Nature Conservancy, along with other organizations, with the responsibility of ensuring that the protection of the natural integrity of the complex is maintain within all aspects of planning and implementation of future decisions.

== See also ==
- List of National Wildlife Refuges: Louisiana
- Interstate 10 in Louisiana
- List of Louisiana Wildlife Management Areas

=== Great Floods ===
- Great Flood of 1844
- Flood of 1851
- Great Flood of 1951
- Great Flood of 1993
