= Interstate 310 (disambiguation) =

Interstate 310 is a freeway connecting I-10 near Louis Armstrong International Airport with U.S. Route 90 near Boutte.

Interstate 310 was also the designation for a couple of canceled highways in the United States, which were related to Interstate 10:

- The Vieux Carré Riverfront Expressway, a canceled freeway in New Orleans planned to be signed as Interstate 310
- Interstate 310 (Mississippi), a canceled freeway connecting I-10 with U.S. Route 90 in Gulfport
