= Huey P. Long Bridge (Baton Rouge) =

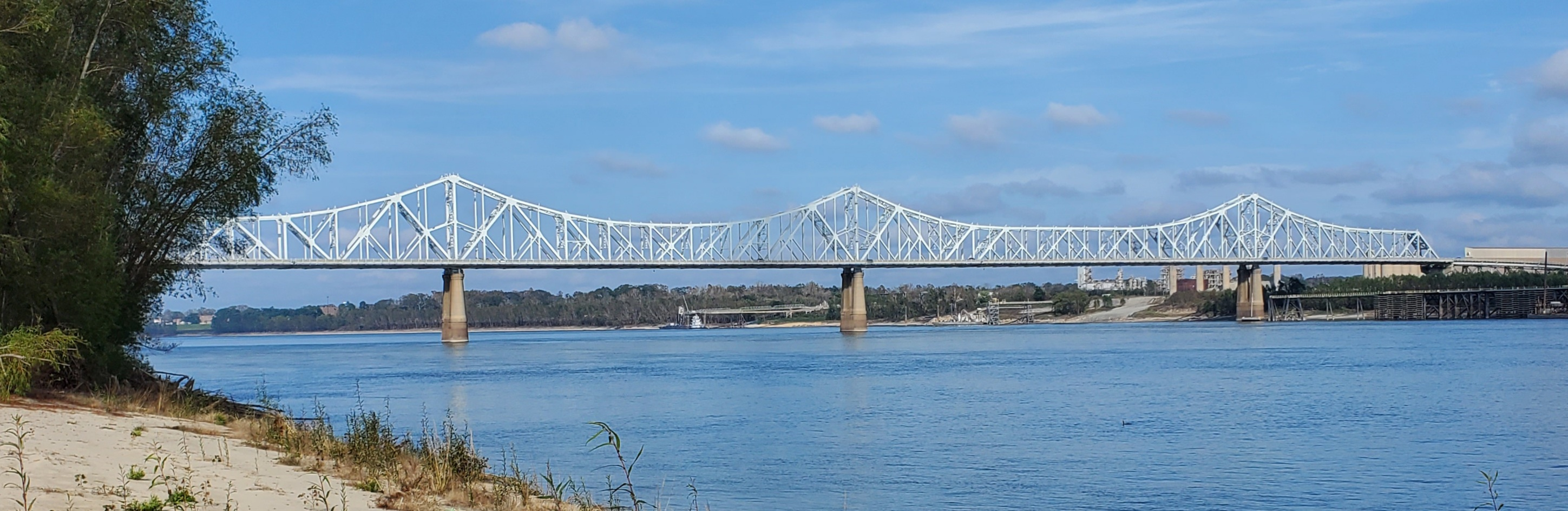
- Huey P. Long Bridge from the southwest
- Coordinates: 30°30′25″N 91°11′51″W
- Carries: 4 lanes of US 190; 1 Canadian Pacific Kansas City rail line
- Crosses: Mississippi River
- Locale: Baton Rouge, Louisiana
- Official name: Huey P. Long - O.K. Allen Bridge
- Other name(s): Old Bridge
- Maintained by: Louisiana Department of Transportation and Development
- ID number: 611700071000001

Characteristics
- Design: Cantilever truss bridge
- Total length: 5,879 feet (1,792 m)
- Width: 47.9 feet (15 m)
- Longest span: 747.8 feet (228 m)
- Clearance below: 113 feet (34 m)

History
- Construction cost: $8.4 million
- Opened: August 1940

Statistics
- Daily traffic: 26,000
- Toll: None

The Huey P. Long - O.K. Allen Bridge (locally known as the Old Bridge) is a truss cantilever bridge over the Mississippi River carrying US 190 (Airline Highway) and one rail line between East Baton Rouge Parish, Louisiana and West Baton Rouge Parish, Louisiana.

Although the bridge is named after former Louisiana governors Huey P. Long and Oscar K. Allen, it is known locally in the Baton Rouge Area as "the old bridge".

It was the only bridge across the Mississippi in Baton Rouge from its opening until April 1968, when the Horace Wilkinson Bridge ("the new bridge") carrying Interstate 10 opened. Until 2011, when the John James Audubon Bridge opened between St. Francisville and New Roads, it was the last bridge crossing the Mississippi before the Natchez-Vidalia Bridge, almost 100 miles to the north.

== Design ==
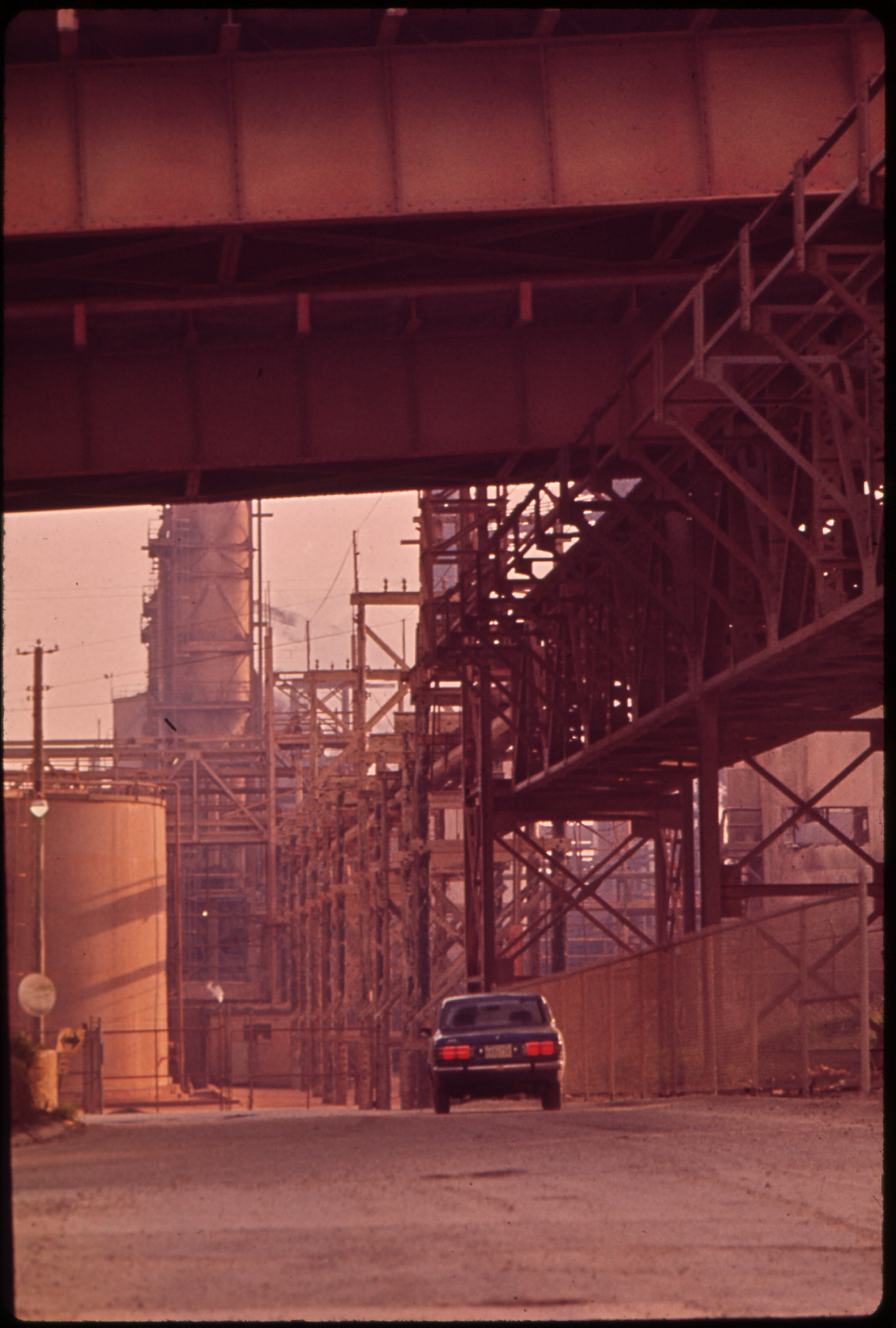
The entrance to the Kaiser Aluminum plant under the bridge in 1972

The bridge is similar in design to the Huey P. Long Bridge in Jefferson Parish, Louisiana (until the downstream bridge was widened to six lanes in 2013). Its lanes are narrow and during cold weather, it has a tendency to ice over.

Due to the low height of the bridge, Baton Rouge is the furthest inland port on the Mississippi River that can accommodate ocean-going tankers and cargo carriers. The ships transfer their cargo (grain, oil, cars, containers) at Baton Rouge onto rails and pipelines (to travel east–west) or barges (to travel north). In addition, the river depth decreases significantly just to the north, near Port Hudson.

== State of repair ==
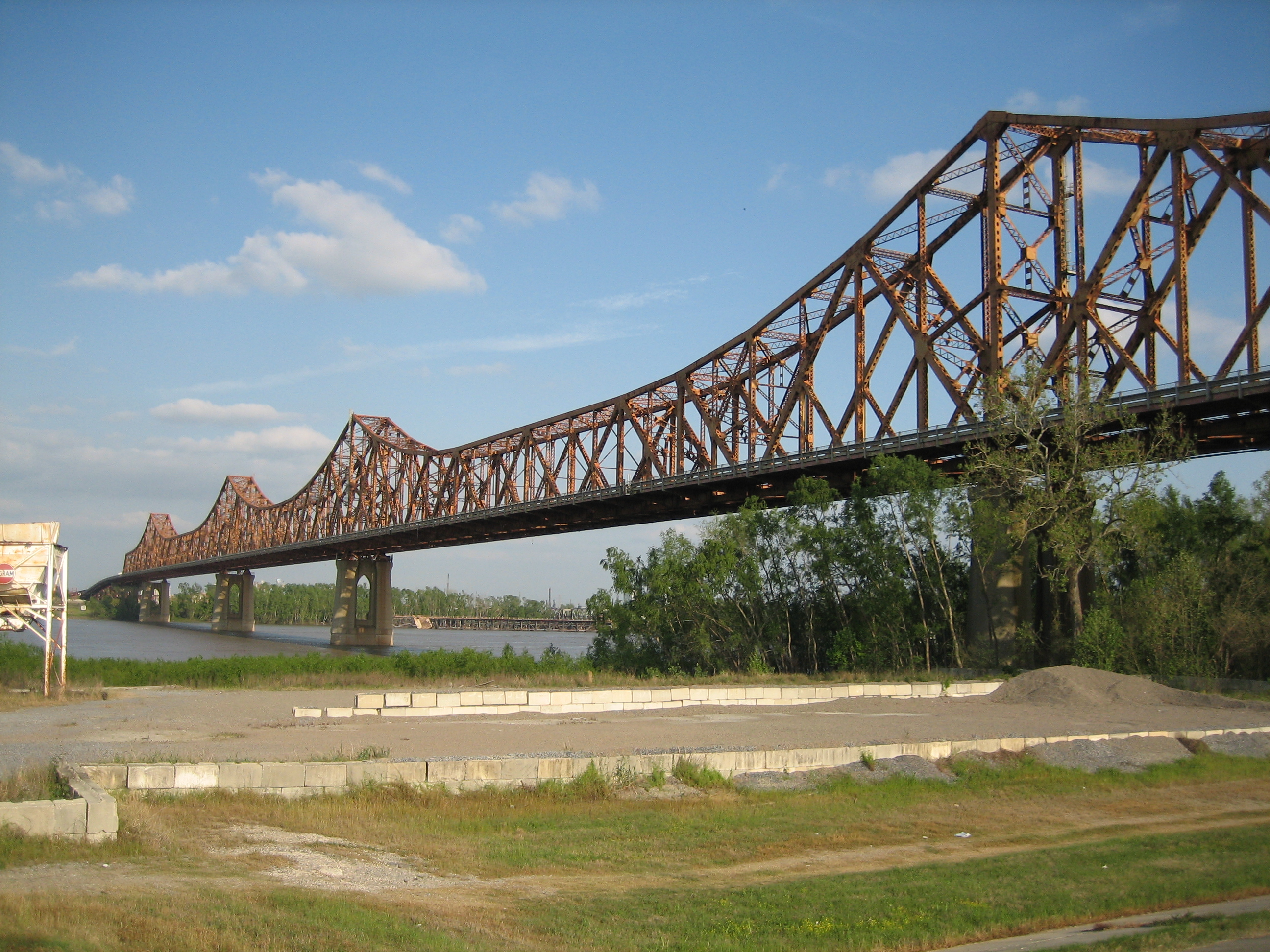
The bridge in 2006, viewed from the northwest. Here, the bridge still bears its 1960s orange paint.

The bridge itself is currently in a poor state of repair; the girder foundations on both railroad approach spans are beginning to show hairline cracks, but engineers have assured the city that the bridge is not in any imminent danger.

The bridge has been repainted several times since its construction, including in the mid-1960s when the bridge was repainted orange; this was done to match the color of dust being emitted by the Kaiser Aluminum plant on the southeast bank of the river, which continually coated the bridge with aluminum oxide (bauxite) dust. It was widened in 1989, and again repainted between 2014 and 2016 to its original color of light gray.

== Planned Interstate 410 ==
The bridge was once planned as part of an Interstate 410.

== Accidents ==
Only one person is reported to have driven off the edge of the bridge. In 1945, a cargo truck driver headed eastbound careened off the sides. The driver fell through the windshield and was crushed on a dock as his truck landed on top of him. The scars from the accident can still be seen on the dock to one's right approaching the east end of the eastbound span.

== In popular culture ==
The bridge is featured in a scene in the 1982 Richard Pryor film, The Toy.

== See also ==
- List of crossings of the Lower Mississippi River
- Kaiser Aluminum plant
