= Louisiana Highway 975 =

Highway in Louisiana

Louisiana Highway 975

Route information
- Maintained by Louisiana DOTD
- Length: 18.43 mi (29.66 km)
- Existed: 1955 renumbering–present

Major junctions
- South end: I-10 at Whiskey Bay
- North end: US 190 / LA 973 east of Krotz Springs

Location
- Country: United States
- State: Louisiana
- Parishes: Iberville, St. Martin, Pointe Coupee

Highway system
- Louisiana State Highway System; Interstate; US; State; Scenic
← LA 974	→ LA 976

Louisiana Highway 975 (LA 975) is a gravel state highway in central Louisiana. It runs north–south for 18.4 miles (29.6 km). The southern terminus is at Whiskey Bay in Iberville Parish, and the northern terminus is east of Krotz Springs at a junction with U.S. Route 190 (US 190) and the north, south LA 973, in Pointe Coupee Parish. The entire route traverses the Sherburne Complex WMA, which is a combined Sherburne WMA, Atchafalaya National Wildlife Refuge, and Bayou Des Ourse, managed by the Louisiana Department of Wildlife and Fisheries. The road runs between the Atchafalaya River and Whiskey Bay Pilot Channel on the west and the East Protection Levee on the east.

== Route description ==
The short route actually runs south of Interstate 10 (I-10) a few miles and makes a loop. The access road from I-10, exit 127 south, has been barricaded and thus the only direction of travel is north. The route is a poorly maintained gravel road that, as most roads of this type, is very dusty during the dry season. Starting in Iberville Parish, LA 975 crosses into St. Martin Parish, then Pointe Coupee Parish before intersecting with US 190. The road travels north through the swampy bottomland of the Atchafalaya Basin, that is part of the Morganza Flood way system, and prone to severe flooding with high water. LA 975 passes Bobtail Bayou, intersects with Bayou Manuel Road, which is at the split of the Atchafalaya River and the beginning of the Whiskey Bay Pilot Channel, then passes the base of Big Alabama Bayou, intersecting with River Road. Continuing north, LA 975 begins to run between the Atchafalaya River, Little Alabama Bayou, and intersects with Happytown Road. At this point Coswell Bayou begins to run in between LA 975 and the Little Alabama Bayou to a point just north of the Point Coupee Parish line. LA 975 intersects Main Road before continuing to the northern terminus at US 190 and LA 973.

== History ==
The route of LA 975 began as a simple trading trail then a lumber tram road from the Town of Sherburne that sprang up around the 1880s and that disappeared when the lumber played out in the 1930s becoming a ghost town. The Sherburne WMA headquarters is located on the old town site alongside the highway. The primary function of the road now is north and south access to the wildlife management areas the road services as well as an access road to oil and gas wells.

== Current ==
Planning has been ongoing for some time for the upgrade of the road. Ditches will be widened to minimize flooding but the ditches to the land side will have to be the focus of attention, so as not to damage nesting areas, as the entire route falls within the protected area of the Sherburn Complex.

== Major intersections ==
Parish	Location	mi	km	Destinations	Notes
Iberville	Whiskey Bay	0.00	0.00	I-10	Southern terminus at exit 127 on I-10
St. Martin	No major junctions				
Pointe Coupee	Krotz Springs	18.43	29.66	US 190	Northern terminus
1.000 mi = 1.609 km; 1.000 km = 0.621 mi
