= I-10 Bonnet Carré Spillway Bridge =

- Coordinates: 30°02′28″N 90°21′01″W
- Carries: 4 lanes of I-10
- Crosses: Bonnet Carré Spillway, Lake Pontchartrain and LaBranche Wetlands
- Locale: St. Charles Parish, St. John the Baptist Parish, Jefferson Parish
- Maintained by: LA DOTD

Characteristics
- Total length: 58,077 feet (17,702 m)
- Width: 45 feet (14 m)

History
- Opened: 1972

The I-10 Bonnet Carré Spillway Bridge is a twin concrete trestle bridge in the U.S. state of Louisiana. With a total length of 58,077 feet (17,702 m; 10.9994 mi), it is one of the longest bridges in the world.

The bridge carries Interstate 10 over the Bonnet Carré Spillway, Lake Pontchartrain, and LaBranche Wetlands in St. Charles Parish and a portion of St. John the Baptist and Jefferson Parishes. The bridge opened in 1972.

== See also ==
- List of bridges in the United States
- List of longest bridges in the world
