= I-10 High Rise Bridge =

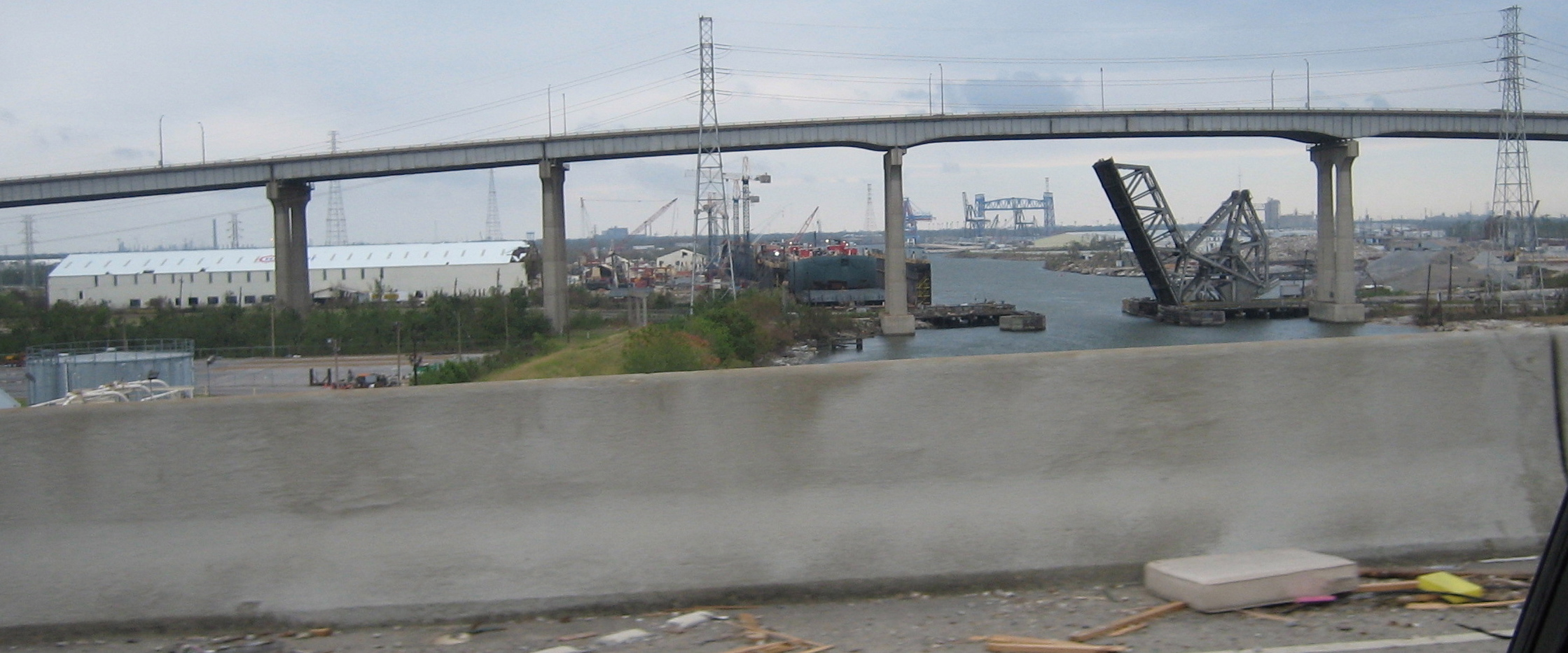
- Coordinates: 30°00′17″N 90°01′33″W
- Carries: I-10
- Crosses: Industrial Canal
- Locale: New Orleans, Louisiana
- Other name(s): High Rise

Characteristics
- Total length: 6,714 feet (2,046 m)

History
- Construction end: 1966

The I-10 High Rise Bridge, known locally as the High Rise, is a bridge carrying 6 lanes of Interstate 10 (I-10) over the Industrial Canal in New Orleans, Louisiana. It also has multiple parts.
