= Calcasieu River Bridge =

Bridge in Louisiana, United States

I-10 Calcasieu River Bridge
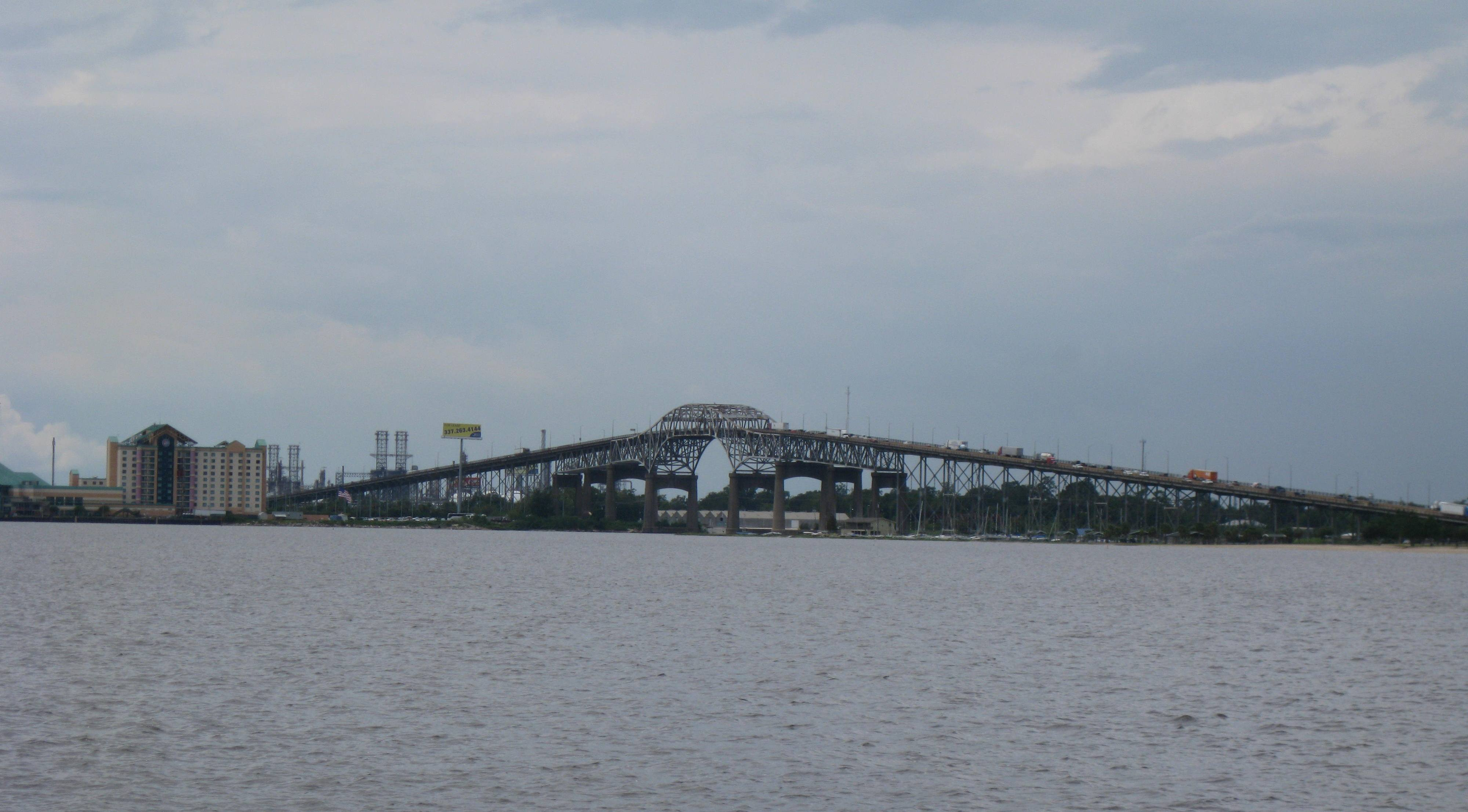
- Coordinates: 30°14′14″N 93°14′45″W
- Carries: 4 lanes of I-10 and US 90
- Crosses: Calcasieu River
- Locale: Between Lake Charles, Louisiana and Westlake, Louisiana
- Other name: I-10 bridge
- Maintained by: Louisiana Department of Transportation and Development
- ID number: 071004509127691

Characteristics
- Design: Through truss
- Total length: 6,605.1 feet (2,013.2 m)
- Width: 52.4 feet (16.0 m)
- Longest span: 420.8 feet (128.3 m)
- Clearance below: 135 feet (41 m)

History
- Designer: N.E. Lant
- Opened: 1952

Statistics
- Daily traffic: 90,000
- Toll: Free both ways

The Calcasieu River Bridge, or the Pistol bridge officially named the Louisiana Memorial World War II Bridge in June 1951 is an arched cantilever, rivet-connected Warren through truss (main span) located on Interstate 10 between Lake Charles, Louisiana, and Westlake, Louisiana. It was the only major bridge in Lake Charles, until the construction of the Lake Charles Loop with the I-210 Calcasieu River High Bridge completed in 1962. It was built under the administration of Gov. Earl K. Long and opened in 1952. It has decorative iron work with crossed guns integrated into the railings. The I-10 Bridge was originally built as the U.S. Hwy 90 bridge and later was grandfathered into Interstate 10.

The bridge has been rated structurally deficient by the Department of Transportation but was declared safe by the Louisiana Department of Transportation and Development (DOTD). There are plans to replace the bridge and improve the Westlake exit.

== History ==
Construction began in 1948 , as part of U.S. Route 90 in Louisiana, and was completed in 1952. The bridge was built before the Interstate Highway System, and included pedestrian walkways that are forbidden on interstate highways, so the bridge is also rated as functionally obsolete. Before the bridge was built, U.S. 90 traffic crossed the Calcasieu River over a draw bridge located by the Port of Lake Charles on Shell Beach Drive, which runs around the south side of the lake. The remnants of the old bridge can still be seen at the end of Shell Beach Drive by the Port.

== Condition ==
The I-10 bridge has been listed by the National Bridge Inventory (NBI) as Structurally Deficient with a rating of 3 and a Sufficiency Rating of 9.9 out of 100. Louisiana has 12,684 bridges with 1,423 (11.2%) listed as SD. It was reported in March 2017 that the sufficiency rating has dropped to 6.6 out of 100

The Federal Highway Administration (FHWA) and the Louisiana Department of Transportation and Development (LA DOTD) initiated a proposed project to replace the bridge in 1999. A feasibility study for the project was completed in 2002 with a projected cost of $450 million.

== Rating ==
As an indication of the bridge rating, a zero means that a bridge is closed. The rating of 1 is not used. The rating for the Calcasieu River Bridge has dropped significantly from 1992 to 2010. The 1992 report listed the deck condition as poor (4 out of 9), the superstructure condition as fair, with a 5 out of 9, an evaluation of structurally deficient, and a sufficiency rating of 40.9. In 2010, the deck condition was 4 out of 9 (the same), the superstructure condition was rated as serious (3 out of 9), the substructure condition was rated as serious (3 out of 9), and a sufficiency rating of 9.9 was assigned. These ratings evidence is a drastic drop in all but one area. The majority of heavy traffic SD bridges have a sufficiency rating of 50 or better. The I-35W Mississippi River bridge had a sufficiency rating of 50 in 2005, was listed again as "structurally deficient" and in possible need of replacement, and had ongoing repairs to include overlay, lighting, and guardrails, before falling in August 2007. A contributing factor has been attributed to the extra weight caused by the construction.

Because of the severe substandard rating, the speed limit has been dropped to 50 mph and heavy trucks have been limited to the right lane on the bridge. This actually causes truck traffic to have to contend with merging ramp traffic from both ways, but particularly the east-bound ramp that merges at the foot of the bridge, creating a bottleneck. With the extreme height of the bridge, trucks speeds drop considerably to as low as 20 mph, creating a steady bumper to bumper congested traffic flow across the entire bridge at times, adding a substantial amount of weight on the bridge.

=== Traffic congestion ===
There are several causes of traffic congestion on the bridge including; a bottle neck caused from three lanes of traffic dropping to two in the busy corridor, an estimated traffic of 55,000 vehicles a day, sharp curves on the east side of the bridge in Lake Charles with reduced speed limits, a narrow bridge. The bridge is listed as currently being 6,617 feet (1 1/4 mile) length with a finished grade of 152.10" elevation. The east grade is 3.8% (listed in 1982 as 3.78% both ways) and the west grade is 3.8% and 5% 600' from the crest. There are no shoulders, no turn-around in case of accidents, and an exposed elevated walk-way on either side that also contributes to the bridge being obsolete.

== Repairs ==
In June 2011, the Louisiana DOTD began a $5.7 million repair project (State Proj. No.: H.006783) on the bridge. Safety and structural repairs included replacing 48 girder pins, and the work was finished by December 22, 2012. Hangers were used for worker safety and precautions were taken to comply with environmental regulations. The existing girder pins were 4-in. (10.2 cm) and were replaced using 4.5-in. (11.4 cm) pins. To facilitate the larger pins, special custom-built drills were used. New 0.875-in. (2.2 cm) A325 structural bolts were used in the pin plate connections. Patrick Bernier, project manager for Topcor Services, LLC, general contractor for the project stated, "The bridge is safe, but it is too narrow according to modern highway standards [ . . . ] And it is too steep on its approaches.”.

Designer N.E. Lant used 5,286 pairs of crossed decorative cast iron pistols placed on the bridge railing, reportedly in homage to pirate history and legends of Jean LaFitte, being the name he preferred, and 50 to 60 pairs have been damaged or determined to be missing. As part of the project, these will be replaced, along with damaged parts of the guard rails. The original castings were done by John Lester Boone Foundry Works of Lawtell, Louisiana. Missing/stolen pistols were recast by an Alabama foundry in the late 1980s and again in the 2000s during major overhauls of the bridge. A state official in Scott, Louisiana stated in 1992 to a Boone descendant that so many people would walk up the thin sidewalks of the bridge at night to chip out and take home the crossed pistols as mantel pieces, that the ornaments had to be replaced to prevent the handrails from collapsing.

== Replacement of the bridge ==
In 2022, the Calcasieu River Bridge turned 70 years old. With over 600,000 bridges, the average bridge age in the United States is 42 years old, with one in nine rated as deficient. Louisiana has a total of 13,050 bridges, and 1,827 (14%) are considered deficient. 1,963 bridges (15%) are considered functionally obsolete.

It had been decided the bridge needed replacing since before 2002. There are several areas of concern including the age of the bridge, the low bridge ratings, steep grades, traffic congestion, amount of traffic that has been estimated at around 55,000 vehicles a day, low vertical traffic clearance, and contamination. These contributing factors rank the bridge as "a dangerous bridge" and 7th in the nation in need of replacing. In 2023, a plan was vetoed on the replacement bridge due to tolls being proposed. This made the project on hold until 2024 when a plan was approved that would include tolls, with especially high prices for trucks.

=== Bridge concepts ===
Four different concepts are being considered for a new bridge.

- Concept A: Would be a new eight lane bridge including an auxiliary lane in both directions. The center of the bridge would be 170 feet north of the center of the current bridge and would require the existing bridge to be removed. The frontage roads would merge onto the bridge and be one-way.
- Concept B: Would be a new six lane bridge with two lane service roads on each side built on the outside or the same structure. This concept includes removing the existing bridge and would be for two-way traffic on the frontage roads.
- Concept C: Would be a new six lane bridge similar to concept B but with the frontage roads on separate structures. This would also require the removal of the existing bridge. This concept would be more invasive to the environment requiring three bridges to be built and would be for two-way frontage roads.
- Concept D: This would be a new six lane bridge with the existing bridge to be rehabilitated and used for the frontage roads. This is the only concept that would require the existing bridge to remain and has some preference because the old bridge has historical significance and is a candidate for historical classification. This design would be for one-way frontage roads. A disadvantage to this concept would be invasion on the beach property and is considered one decision on a particular bridge (considered in 2002) has still not been determined and this has been pushed off until 2016. The preliminary report, subject to change and updating, shows that all the concepts and alternates have common features, calling for steel box girders for the main spans, four spans at 200', 270', 270', and 200', u-turn on the east end, improving the I-10 profile at abandoned railroad, modifying the existing ramps on the east end of the bridge for westbound traffic and eastbound exit at I-10 and US 90 (east), center-line alignment 3 (or similar), bridge profile 2, and the Ryan street ramp construction.

Four alternates, that use two of the four bridge concepts, differ depending on if one-way or two-way service roads are chosen. Alternate 1 shows a preference for bridge concept A. Alternate 2 shows a preference for bridge concept C with continuous service roads across the bridge. All the bridge profiles use models with a 95' finished grade elevation, 57.10' lower than the current bridge, and a vertical clearance of 73' that is 62' lower than the current bridge. All bridge models show a 3% grade on the west side. The east side would be 3% for bridge profile 1, with 2.25% for profile 2, and 1.65% for profile 3.

=== Conversion to pedestrian bridge ===
There is a local movement to preserve the existing bridge by converting it to pedestrian use after the replacement bridge is constructed. The group, Save Our Bridge, cites the Bridge's iconic status on the city skyline, cultural relevance in local art, and architectural heritage all as reasons for preservation. Adaptive Reuse of the bridge will also provide a key pedestrian access from the cities of Lake Charles and Westlake while drawing tourists to the area, promoting economic growth and health and wellness for locals.

While the bridge is no longer suitable for interstate traffic, it is possible to convert it to pedestrian use without significant economic investment. The Save Our Bridge effort is promoting the funding of an engineering study to determine the feasibility of preservation and pedestrian use as well as providing a conceptual design.

=== 2024 ===
After a first round of negotiations in November 2023 failed a new plan was drawn up. Louisiana Department of Transportation and Development Secretary Eric Kalivoda (La DOTD) sent letters to both Patrick McMath of the Louisiana Senate, and Mark Write to the Louisiana House of Representatives, both chairmen of their respective Senate and House Committees on Transportation, Highways, and Public Works. The letters are in accordance with Louisiana Revised Statute 48:250.4(A)(2). The letters (and emails) requesting approval to sign a public-private partnership (P3) contract, with Calcasieu Bridge Partners for the replacement of the Interstate 10 bridge, over the Calcasieu River in Calcasieu Parish. The requests were approved by the Louisiana legislature’s Joint Transportation Committee which was approved for a public-private partnership (P3) to build the bridge. Although resisted at first apparently the public and interested groups agreed to the proposal. The approved contract is for a $2.1B Calcasieu River bridge and supporting roadway from the I-210/I-10 east junction to the I-10/I-210 west. The proposal between the DOTD and Calcasieu Bridge Partners (CBP) was approved and a signed contract to include a bridge and a 5.5-mile toll corridor.

Project construction on the toll road and bridge is scheduled to last seven years and the tolls for 70 years. Governor Jeff Landry signed on after having the toll reduced. Landry stated the reduced toll he agreed to would remove any state financial liability and offer a reduced toll to area residents of five connecting parishes the toll will be $.25. There is some conflicting reports. 15% of any profits from the tolls would go to either the Lake Charles area or split between the five parishes.

Many wanted to keep the old bridge for historic reasons. The bridge qualifies for NHRP listing but the plans call for the bridge to be torn down when construction is completed.

The amount secured so far:

- $150 million from the DOTD from a federal government discretionary grant for the project,
- Department of Motor Vehicles transfers amounting to $240 million.
- $150 million from the American Rescue Plan Act,
- $85 million backed by the state’s general obligation,
- $75 million from the Federal Highway Priority Program
- $100 million from state general fund.

Project partners, according to I-10 Calcasieu Mobility partners, are CINTRA, a transportation infrastructure company based in Austin, Texas. and others in a long list of partners.

A notice to proceed on the $2.3 billion dollar super project has been authorized. 15 percent of the net toll revenue profits will be used to shorten the expected 50 year toll or to fund future projects in the five-parish area. State and federal funding will cover $1.2 billion of the project’s overall cost. The remaining costs will be covered through toll revenue.

=== Bridge details ===
The new bridge was dubbed "Alternative 5G", or State Project Number: H.003931, that was included in the December 2, 2020, DOTD fact sheet, has been chosen.

=== Construction partners ===
Calcasieu Bridge Partners Consortium consist of a joint venture of Plenary Americas US Holdings, Inc., Sacyr Infrastructure USA LLC, and Acciona Concesiones S.L.

=== Construction ===
Ground was broken for the project on April 29, 2026.

== Wildlife ==
Wildlife concerns were studied. There were instances of observation of a pair of bald eagles and aerie, American white pelicans, Belted kingfisher, Downy woodpecker, Northern flicker, Northern cardinal, Little brown skink, Red-eared slider, gray squirrels, nine-banded armadillos, and feral hogs. Although risks are considered low, mitigation measures are included.
