= Horace Wilkinson Bridge =

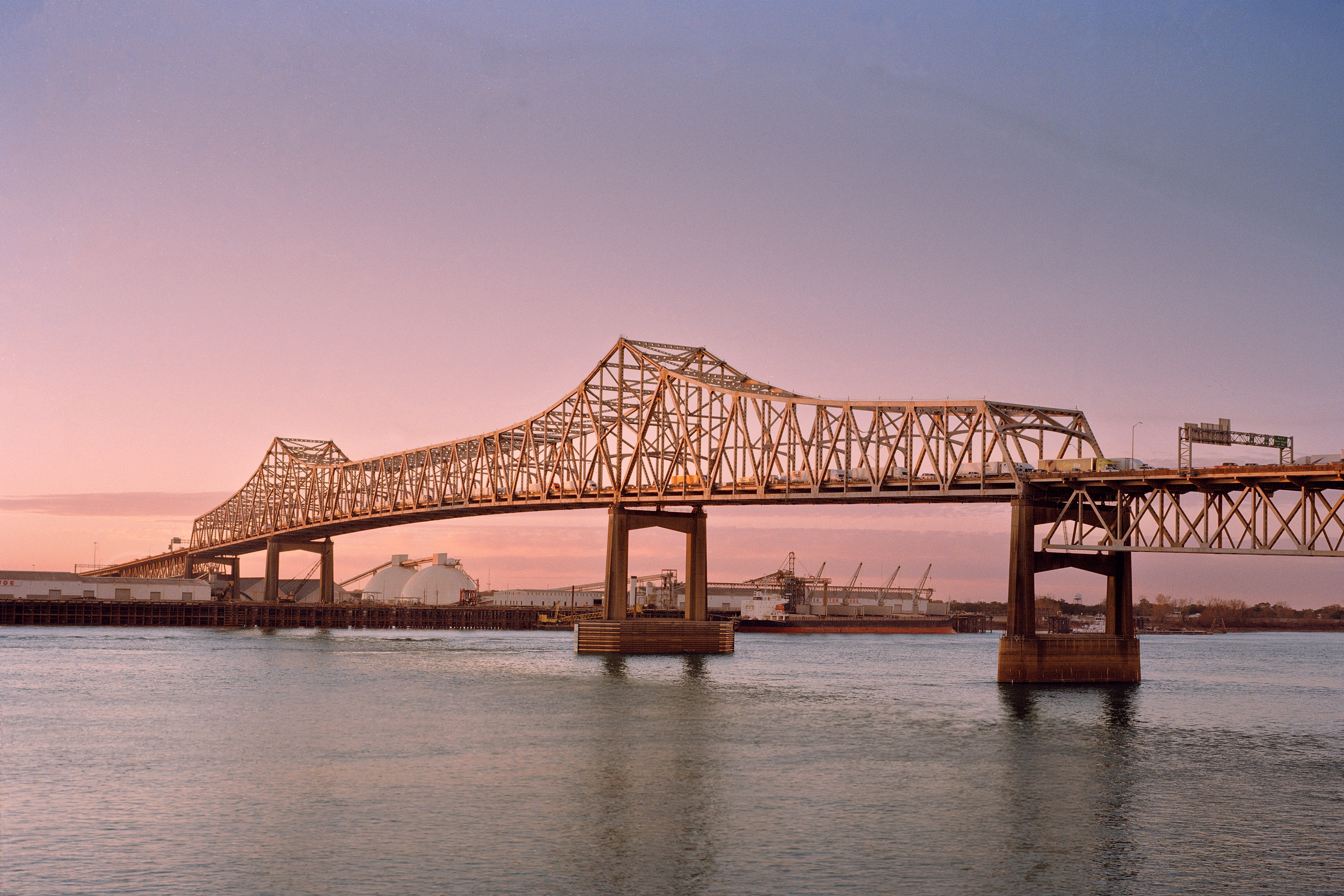
- View of the Horace Wilkinson Bridge looking northwest from the east bank of the river in January 2023.
- Coordinates: 30°26′22.2″N 91°11′47.4″W
- Carries: 6 lanes of I-10
- Crosses: Mississippi River
- Locale: Baton Rouge, Louisiana
- Other name(s): The New Bridge, Mississippi River Bridge
- Maintained by: LaDOTD
- ID number: 611704500900001

Characteristics
- Design: Cantilever bridge
- Total length: 4,550 feet (1,387 m) (superstructure); 14,150 feet (4,313 m) (overall)
- Width: 80 feet (24 m)
- Longest span: 1,235 feet (376 m)
- Clearance below: 175 feet (53 m)

History
- Engineering design by: Modjeski & Masters
- Construction cost: $46 million
- Opened: April 10, 1968

Statistics
- Daily traffic: 126,000 (2022)

The Horace Wilkinson Bridge (locally known as the New Bridge) is a cantilever bridge carrying Interstate 10 in Louisiana across the Mississippi River from Port Allen in West Baton Rouge Parish to Baton Rouge in East Baton Rouge Parish. Around the Baton Rouge metropolitan area, the bridge is more commonly known as the "New Bridge" because it is the younger of the two bridges that cross the river in Baton Rouge, downstream of the older Huey P. Long Bridge.

The structure begins at the Louisiana Highway 1 (LA 1) exit south of Port Allen. After the interstate crosses the superstructure, it remains an elevated viaduct up to the Dalrymple Drive exit to Louisiana State University. It is the highest bridge on the Mississippi River.

== Name ==
The bridge is named after three separate Horace Wilkinsons who served a total of 54 years in the Louisiana legislature. Horace Wilkinson, along with his son and grandson, were honored with the naming of the I-10 bridge by Act 206 of the Louisiana Legislature in 1968.

== Traffic ==
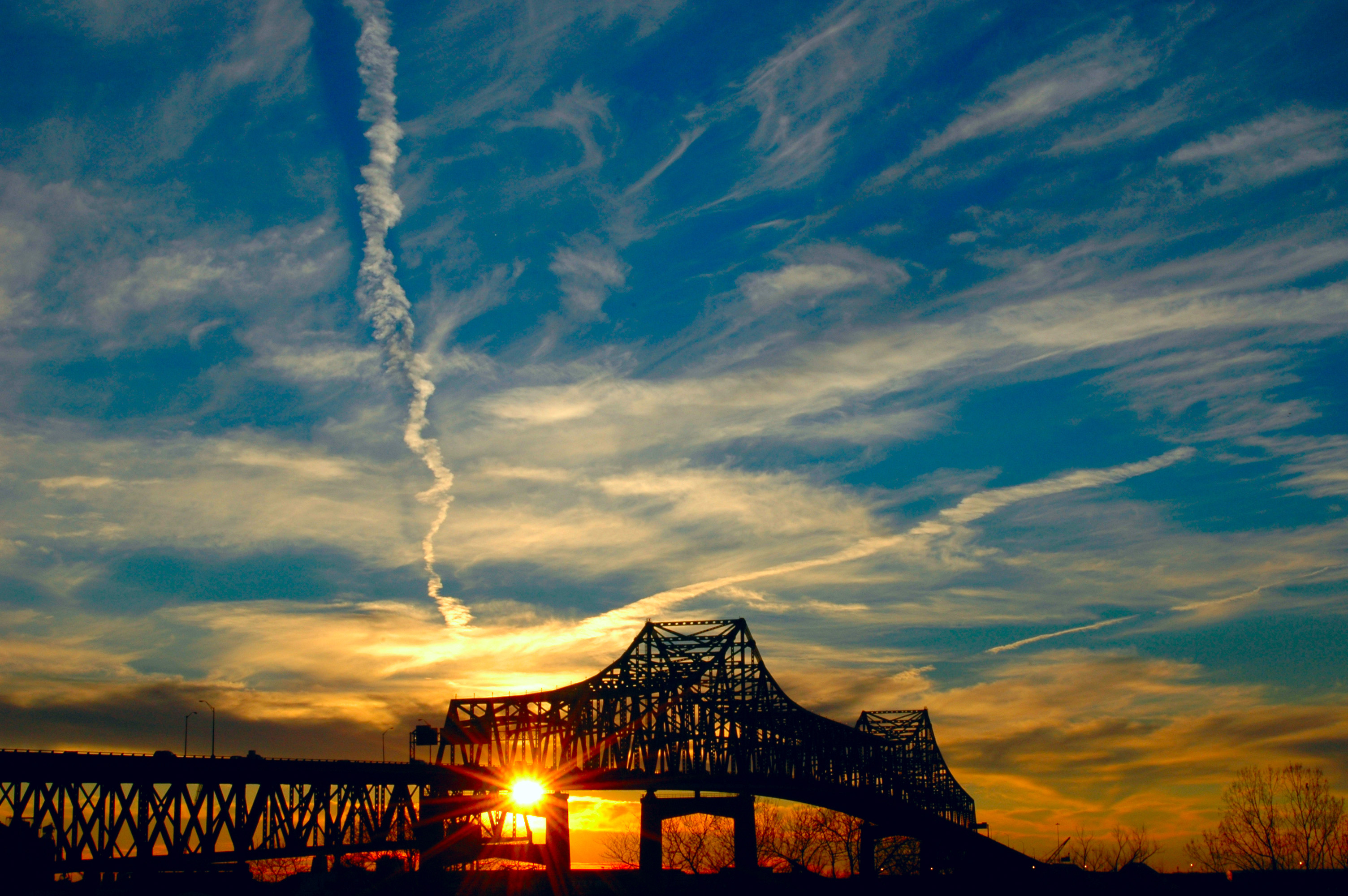
Sunset View

The bridge is notorious amongst many for daily backups stretching a few miles (several kilometers). Most traffic stems from the I-10/I-110 junction. Eastbound traffic is reduced from three lanes to one through lane and an exit lane to Washington Street around a sharp curve. Traffic must be cautious as traffic from I-110 South may cross all lanes of traffic to exit at Washington street, only 1/4 mile (0.40 km) away. Because of this junction and lack of shoulders along the entire bridge, traffic usually backs up to, at least, the LA 415 exit (Exit 151) and for three miles (4.8 km) along LA 1 northbound.

Westbound congestion occurs from slower traffic entering from the short transition zone of the St. Ferdinand Street entrance ramp and the narrowing of I-10 when it loses a lane to exit at LA 1.

In response, Sherri LeBas, secretary of the LA DOTD, said that as of November 2013, it was not looking at widening or modernizing the I-10/I-110 interchange, citing cost. Instead, the state will modernize LA 1 from I-10 to US-190 to encourage detours to the less-congested Huey Long Bridge.

== Improvements ==
Around October 2003, the I-10E/I-110S merge was re-striped to reduce I-110 South from three lanes to two lanes, allowing I-10 its own lane, no longer mandating I-10 East commuters to shift to the left to continue on I-10 East.

In August 2010, the I-10 West exit to LA 1 had been restriped to prevent the center lane from exiting. This change has since been reverted.

In 2010, the bridge's signage was replaced. These newer signs better demarcate the boundary between West Baton Rouge Parish and East Baton Rouge Parish. The installed signs also displayed the official name of the bridge.

A project began in 2015 to grind rust off the bridge.

== See also ==
- List of crossings of the Lower Mississippi River
