= Westlake, Louisiana =

- City
- Motto: A Growing Family Community
- Location of Westlake in Calcasieu Parish, Louisiana.

- Location of Louisiana in the United States
- Coordinates: 30°14′54″N 93°15′25″W
- Country: United States
- State: Louisiana
- Parish: Calcasieu
- Incorporated: 1945

Area
  - Total: 3.79 sq mi (9.82 km^{2})
  - Land: 3.79 sq mi (9.82 km^{2})
  - Water: 0 sq mi (0.00 km^{2})
- Elevation: 13 ft (4.0 m)

Population (2020)
  - Total: 4,781
  - Density: 1,261.1/sq mi (486.92/km^{2})
- Time zone: UTC-6 (CST)
  - Summer (DST): UTC-5 (CDT)
- ZIP code: 70669
- Area code: 337
- FIPS code: 22-80815
- GNIS feature ID: 2405718
- Website: www.cityofwestlake.com

Westlake is an industrial city in Calcasieu Parish, in western Louisiana, United States, and is part of the Lake Charles metropolitan statistical area. The population was 4,781 in 2020. Westlake was incorporated in 1945. There are many chemical plants and oil refineries situated around the Westlake area.

== Geography ==
Westlake is located in east-central Calcasieu Parish on the west bank of the Calcasieu River, just north of that river's entry into the water body of Lake Charles. The city of Lake Charles borders Westlake across the river, connected via the Interstate 10 bridge, Calcasieu River Bridge.

According to the United States Census Bureau, Westlake has a total area of 3.71 square miles (9.60 km^{2}), of which 3.65 square miles (9.46 km^{2}) is land and 0.05 square miles (0.14 km^{2}), or 1.49%, is water.

Moss Bluff is just to the northeast. Sulphur is to the west, after the small community of Mossville.

== Demographics ==
Historical population
| Census | Pop. | Note | %± |
|---|---|---|---|
| 1950 | 1,871 | | — |
| 1960 | 3,311 | | 77.0% |
| 1970 | 4,082 | | 23.3% |
| 1980 | 5,246 | | 28.5% |
| 1990 | 5,007 | | −4.6% |
| 2000 | 4,668 | | −6.8% |
| 2010 | 4,568 | | −2.1% |
| 2020 | 4,781 | | 4.7% |
| 2025 (est.) | 4,763 | ▼ | −0.4% |
U.S. Decennial Census

=== Racial and ethnic composition ===
Westlake city, Louisiana – Racial and Ethnic Composition (NH = Non-Hispanic) Note: the US Census treats Hispanic/Latino as an ethnic category. This table excludes Latinos from the racial categories and assigns them to a separate category. Hispanics/Latinos may be of any race.
| Race / Ethnicity | Pop 2000 | Pop 2010 | Pop 2020 | % 2000 | % 2010 | % 2020 |
|---|---|---|---|---|---|---|
| White alone (NH) | 3,688 | 3,425 | 3,340 | 79.01% | 74.98% | 69.86% |
| Black or African American alone (NH) | 836 | 897 | 925 | 17.91% | 19.64% | 19.35% |
| Native American or Alaska Native alone (NH) | 9 | 23 | 13 | 0.19% | 0.50% | 0.27% |
| Asian alone (NH) | 10 | 13 | 42 | 0.21% | 0.28% | 0.88% |
| Pacific Islander alone (NH) | 0 | 3 | 1 | 0.00% | 0.07% | 0.02% |
| Some Other Race alone (NH) | 0 | 1 | 4 | 0.00% | 0.02% | 0.08% |
| Mixed Race/Multi-Racial (NH) | 42 | 54 | 153 | 0.90% | 1.18% | 3.20% |
| Hispanic or Latino (any race) | 83 | 152 | 303 | 1.78% | 3.33% | 6.34% |
| Total | 4,668 | 4,568 | 4,781 | 100.00% | 100.00% | 100.00% |

=== 2020 census ===
As of the 2020 census, Westlake had a population of 4,781. The median age was 37.1 years. 25.0% of residents were under the age of 18 and 18.2% of residents were 65 years of age or older. For every 100 females there were 93.0 males, and for every 100 females age 18 and over there were 91.2 males age 18 and over.

100.0% of residents lived in urban areas, while 0.0% lived in rural areas.

There were 1,922 households in Westlake, including 1,178 family households, of which 34.4% had children under the age of 18 living in them. Of all households, 40.2% were married-couple households, 20.7% were households with a male householder and no spouse or partner present, and 33.7% were households with a female householder and no spouse or partner present. About 30.2% of all households were made up of individuals and 16.2% had someone living alone who was 65 years of age or older.

There were 2,188 housing units, of which 12.2% were vacant. The homeowner vacancy rate was 3.7% and the rental vacancy rate was 11.9%.

== Government ==
Westlake uses a city council consisting of five council members. As of Jan 2023, the current mayor of Westlake is Hal Mcmillin.

== Notable people ==
- Mikey Kile, racing driver
- David LaFleur, professional American football player for the Dallas Cowboys.
- Joshua Ledet earned third place on American Idol season 11.

== Education ==
Public schools in the town are operated by the Calcasieu Parish Public School System.

Elementary schools:

- Westwood Elementary School
- Western Heights Elementary School

Middle school:

- S. P. Arnett Middle School

High school:

- Westlake High School

== List of mayors ==
- 1945–1950 Gus Warren Anderson
- 1950–1954 John Warren (Jack) Grout
- 1954–1957 Gus Warren Anderson (2.)
- 1957–1974 Charles M. Carroll
- 1974–1982 Wilridge P. Doucet
- 1982–2006 Dudley Dixon
- 2007–2014 Daniel Cupit
- 2015–2022 Robert "Bob" Hardey
- 2022–2023 Dan Racca (Pro-Tem)
- 2023–Present Hal McMillin

== See also ==
- Westlake Corporation
