= Atchafalaya Basin Bridge =

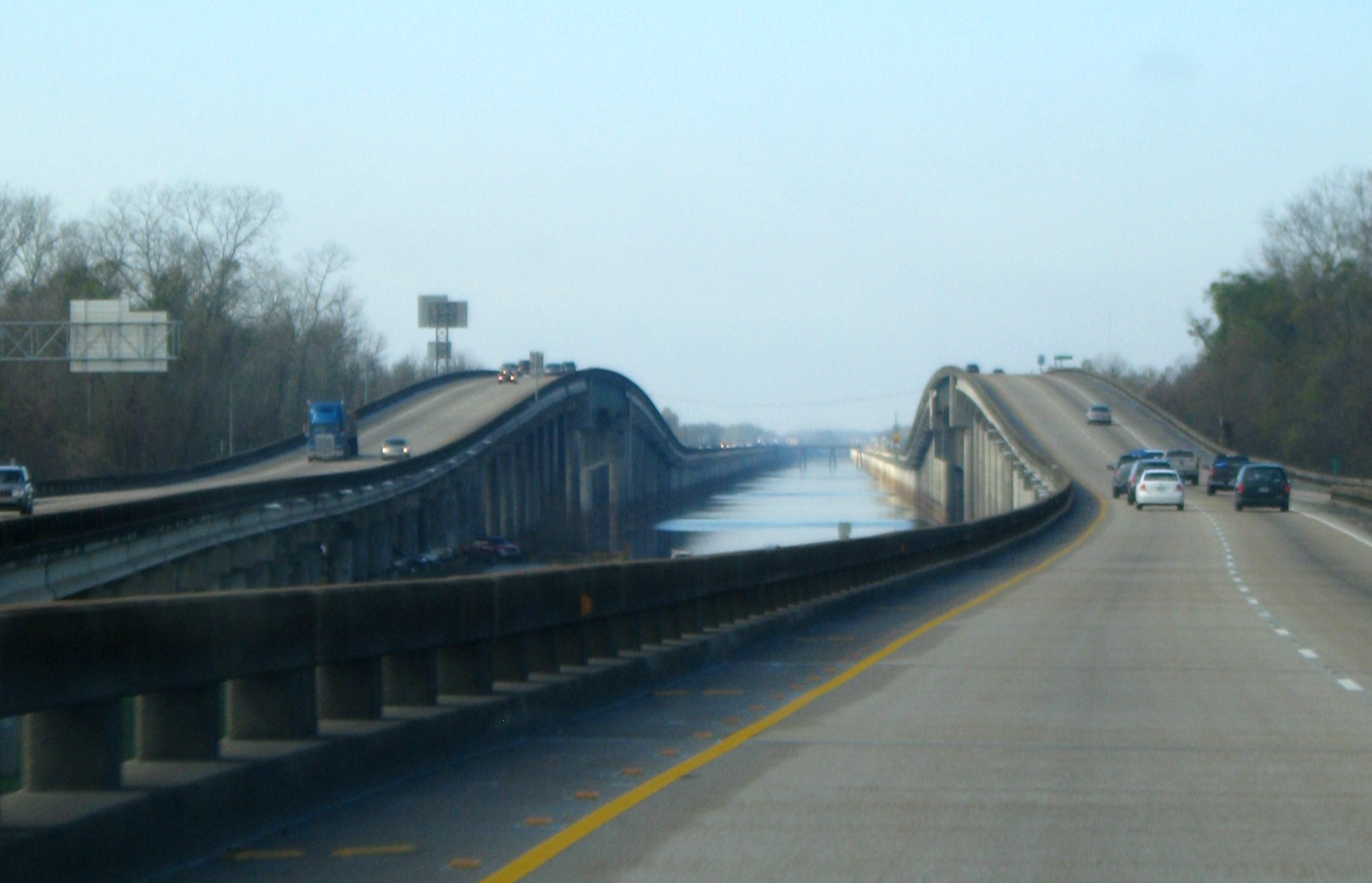
- Coordinates: 30°19′57″N 91°45′33″W
- Carries: 4 lanes of I-10
- Crosses: Atchafalaya Basin
- Locale: Iberville Parish / St. Martin Parish, Louisiana, U.S.
- Other name(s): 20 Mile Bridge; Swamp Freeway
- Maintained by: LA DOTD
- ID number: BH 46720

Characteristics
- Design: Stringer
- Total length: 96,095 ft (29,290 m)
- Width: 40.0 feet (12.2 m)

History
- Opened: 1973

Statistics
- Daily traffic: 30,420 daily (2015)
- Toll: None

Location
- Interactive map of Atchafalaya Basin Bridge

The Atchafalaya Basin Bridge, also known as the Louisiana Airborne Memorial Bridge, is a pair of parallel bridges in the U.S. state of Louisiana between Baton Rouge and Lafayette which carries Interstate 10 over the Atchafalaya Basin. With a total length of 96,095 feet (29,290 m; 18 mi; 29 km), it is the third longest bridge in the U.S., the second longest on the interstate system, and 24th-longest in the world by total length.

Construction was said to have begun in 1971, and the bridge was opened to the public in 1973. At the time of its completion, it was the second longest bridge in the United States, behind the Lake Pontchartrain Causeway Bridge. The bridge includes two exits: one for Whiskey Bay (Louisiana Highway 975) and another for Butte La Rose (LA 3177). While the bridges run parallel for most of their length, they merge when crossing the Whiskey Bay Pilot Channel and the Atchafalaya River. The average daily traffic count is (as of 2015) 30,420 vehicles.

Accidents occur frequently near the two river crossings as both are very narrow and lack shoulders. Accidents along the bridge can be problematic as the Atchafalaya Basin is sparsely inhabited. In 1999, Governor Mike Foster lowered the speed limit on the bridge from 70 to 60 mph (115 to 95 km/h). In 2003, the Louisiana Legislature enacted new traffic regulations for the bridge. The speed limit for 18-wheelers was lowered to 55 mph (90 km/h), and they must remain in the right lane while crossing the bridge.

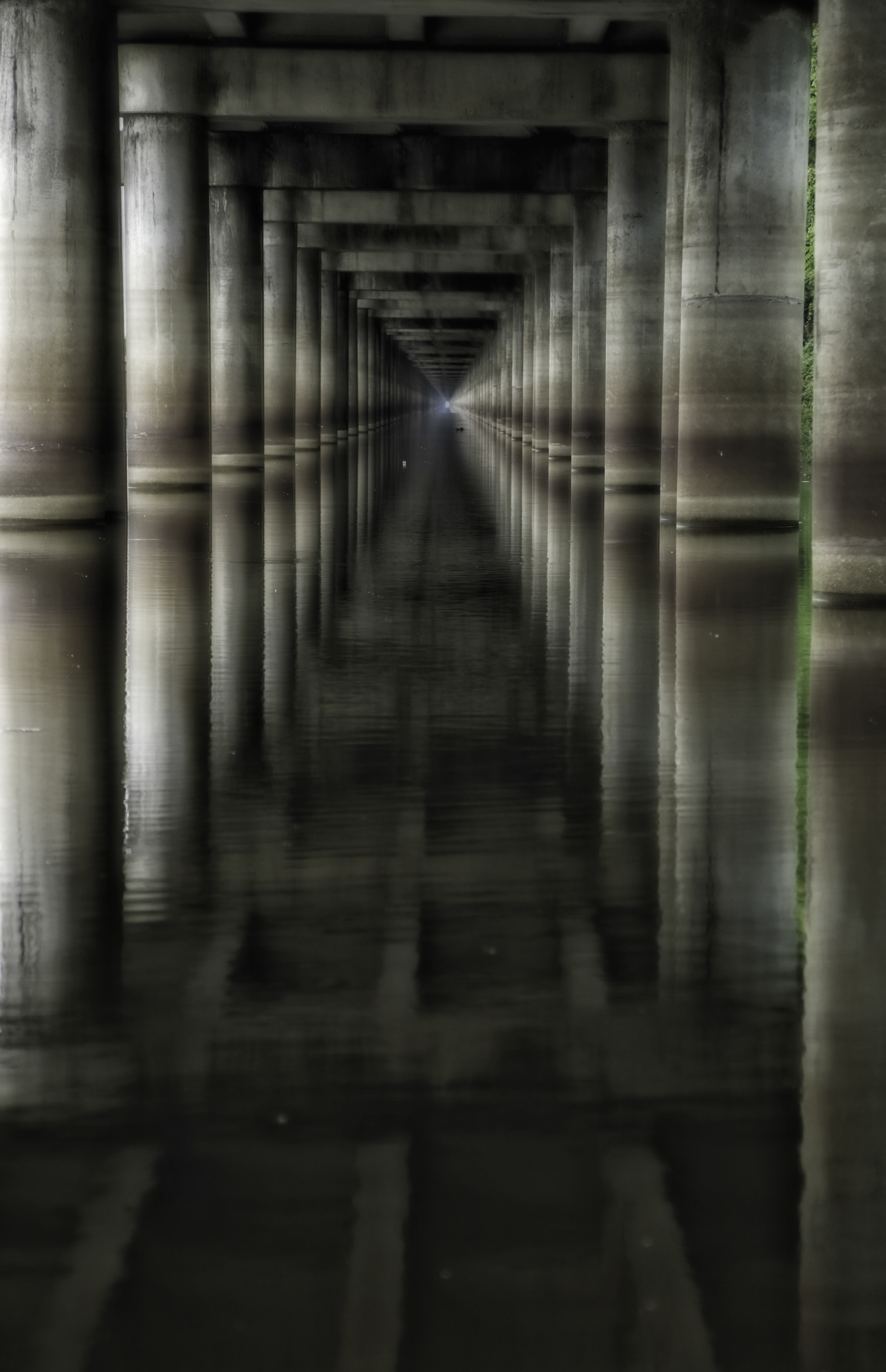
Atchafalaya Basin Bridge's structural support, I-10, Whiskey Bay

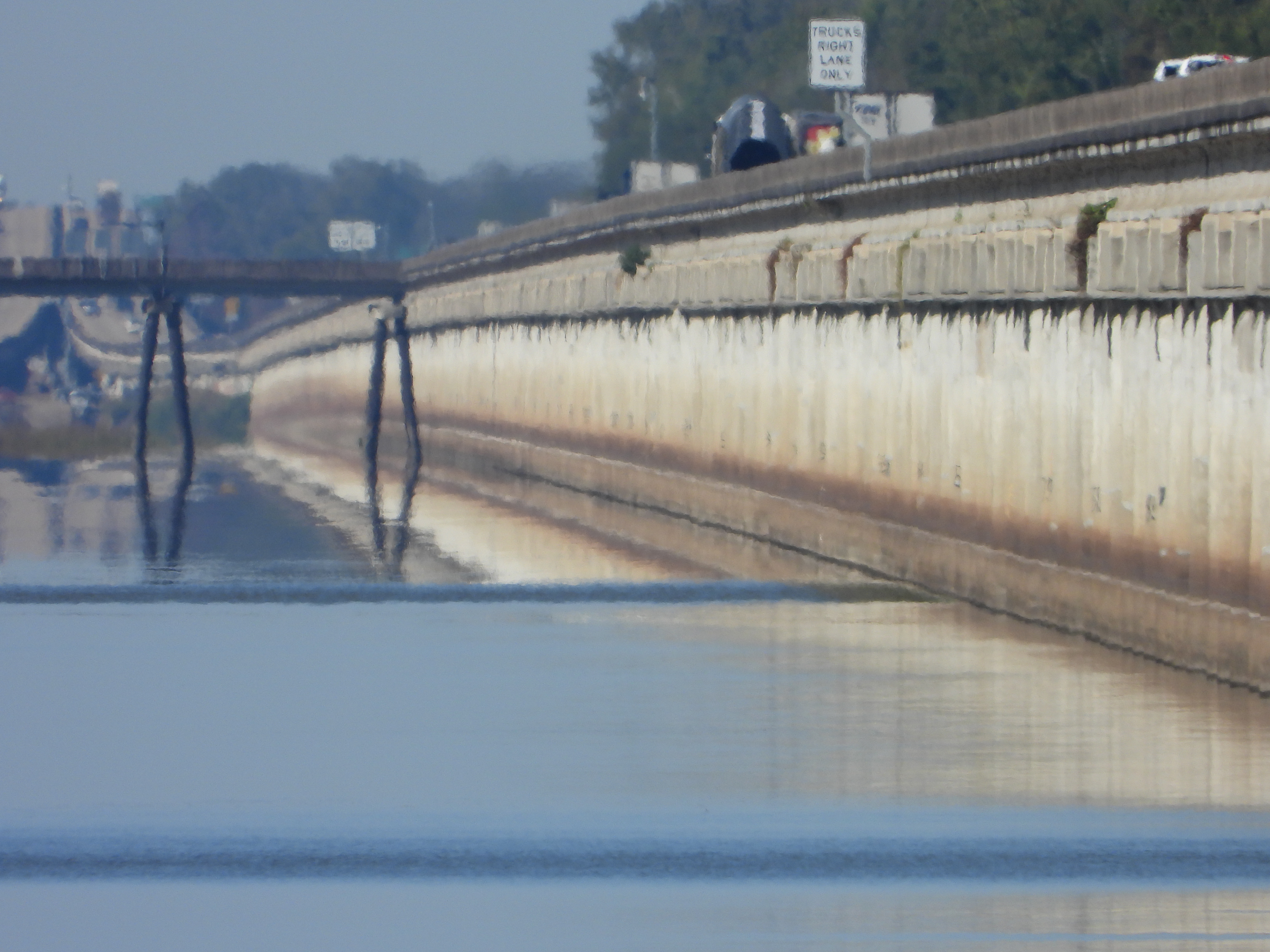
Atchafalaya Basin Bridge's structural support

== Bridge renamed ==
The United States Army Airborne Forces (paratroopers and glider soldiers) was created by executive order and the 82nd Airborne Division was formed at Camp Claiborne, Louisiana in March 1942. One of the main objectives of the division, and all airborne divisions was for paratroopers and glider borne forces to seize bridges for regular follow-on forces to use. The 82nd Airborne Division Association put forth a challenge in 1988, to member chapters in all states, to pursue having a bridge in their state designated as an Airborne Memorial Bridge.

The Acadiana Chapter of the 82nd Airborne Division Association, created January 1980, in Lafayette, Louisiana with headquarters in Lafayette, Louisiana, petitioned the Louisiana Legislature and on July 10, 1989, act 793 was passed, and the bridge was renamed the Louisiana Airborne Memorial Bridge.

=== Welcome center ===
There is a visitor center at mile marker 121 (La. Route 3177), with 18-wheeler parking. The Acadiana chapter secured funding to erect a monument to the 82nd Airborne Division which was dedicated on October 20, 1990.

== Bridge condition ==
As of September 2010, inspection showed the deck condition rating: satisfactory (6 out of 9), the superstructure condition rating: satisfactory (6 out of 9), the substructure condition rating: satisfactory (6 out of 9), and the sufficiency rating: 92.9 (out of 100)

== Cameras ==
There are multiple cameras mounted on the bridge (viewable to the public) at the beginning of the west side at mile marker 121 (LA 3177) east and west, at mile marker 124.5 east and west, at mile marker 127 (Whiskey Bay and LA 975) east and west, at mile marker 131.5 (Butte Larose east and west, and at the east end at mile marker 135 (LA 3000/Ramah Rd.) east and west.

== See also ==
- List of bridges in the United States
- List of longest bridges
