= Vieux Carré Riverfront Expressway =

Highway in Louisiana

Vieux Carré Riverfront Expressway
- Proposed Vieux Carré Riverfront Expressway corridor highlighted in red

Route information
- History: Planned 1964–1969

Location
- Country: United States
- State: Louisiana

Highway system
- Interstate Highway System; Main; Auxiliary; Suffixed; Business; Future; Louisiana State Highway System; Interstate; US; State; Scenic

The Vieux Carré Riverfront Expressway was a controversial, mostly-elevated, never-built freeway that would have cut through the French Quarter (Vieux Carré) of New Orleans, Louisiana. From 1964 to 1969, it was also designated Interstate 310 (I-310).

== Route description ==
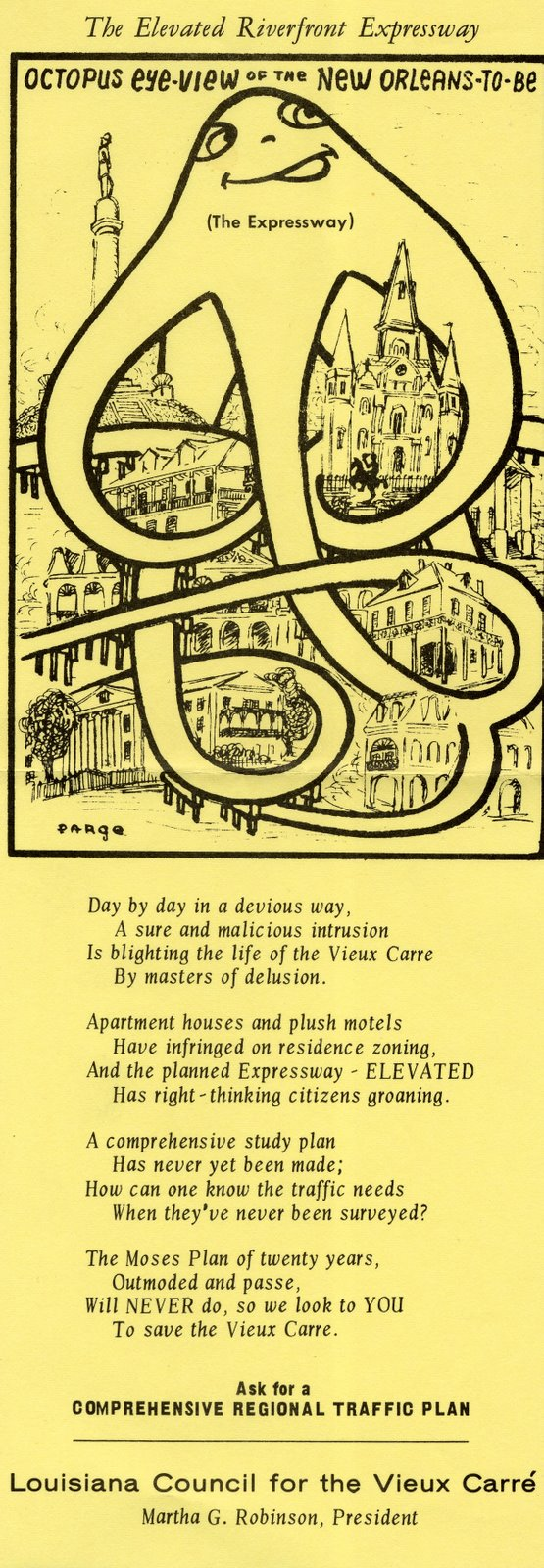
Flyer by the Louisiana Council for the Vieux Carré opposing the proposed elevated riverfront expressway in New Orleans, c. mid-1960s.

The freeway would have split from I-10 at exit 237 (Elysian Fields Avenue—Louisiana Highway 3021) and run south along Elysian Fields Avenue to the Mississippi River. There, it would turn southwest and run to a point near Lafayette Street, where ramps would connect to the Greater New Orleans Bridge (U.S. Route 90 Business). An extension, never part of the Interstate Highway System, was to continue west to meet the Earhart Expressway (Louisiana Highway 3139).

A small piece of the freeway was built as a six-lane, 690-by-98-foot-long-and-wide (210 m × 30 m) tunnel, under the Rivergate Convention Center, now Caesars New Orleans. It is now used for valet parking.

== History ==
The Louisiana Highway Department (predecessor to the Louisiana Department of Transportation and Development) hired Robert Moses as a consultant in 1946 to examine New Orleans' traffic and propose solutions. His proposals included a 40-by-108-foot-high-and-wide (12 m × 33 m) freeway running 3.5 miles (5.6 km) from I-10 near Elysian Fields Ave, following Elysian Fields at ground level to the riverfront, and continuing south, elevated to the US 90 Bus. bridge approach. It was not added to the Interstate Highway System as an urban route in the 1950s due to a lack of funding, but, by 1961, it was being considered for addition. One proposal to gain the mileage was to shift I-10 to the Riverfront route, but eventually, in 1964, the I-420 bypass of Monroe was removed from the Interstate System and the mileage transferred to the Riverfront Expressway project. It was officially added to the Interstate Highway System on October 13, 1964, as I-310.

After wide local opposition, the freeway was removed from the Interstate System on August 22, 1969. Its mileage was used in part for a new southern bypass of New Orleans—I-410—which was itself never completed.

== See also ==
- Earhart Expressway
- Freeway and expressway revolts
