= Atchafalaya National Wildlife Refuge =

Wildlife refuge in Louisiana

- IUCN category IV (habitat/species management area)
- Location within the United States
- Location: Iberville / St. Martin parishes, Louisiana
- Nearest city: Krotz Springs, Louisiana
- Coordinates: 30°29′00″N 91°44′00″W
- Area: 15,000 acres (61 km^{2})
- Established: 1986
- Governing body: U.S. Fish and Wildlife Service
- Website: Atchafalaya National Wildlife Refuge

Atchafalaya National Wildlife Refuge

The Atchafalaya National Wildlife Refuge is located about 30 miles (48 km) west of Baton Rouge, Louisiana, and one mile (1.6 km) east of Krotz Springs, Louisiana, lies just east of the Atchafalaya River. In 1988 under the administration of Governor Foster the "Atchafalaya Basin Master Plan" was implemented that combined the 11,780-acre (4,770 ha) Sherburne Wildlife Management Area (WMA), the 15,220-acre (6,160 ha) Atchafalaya National Wildlife Refuge, and the 17,000-acre (6,900 ha) U.S. Army Corps of Engineers' Bayou Des Ourses (Bayou of the Bears) into the Sherburne Complex Wildlife Management Area.

== History ==
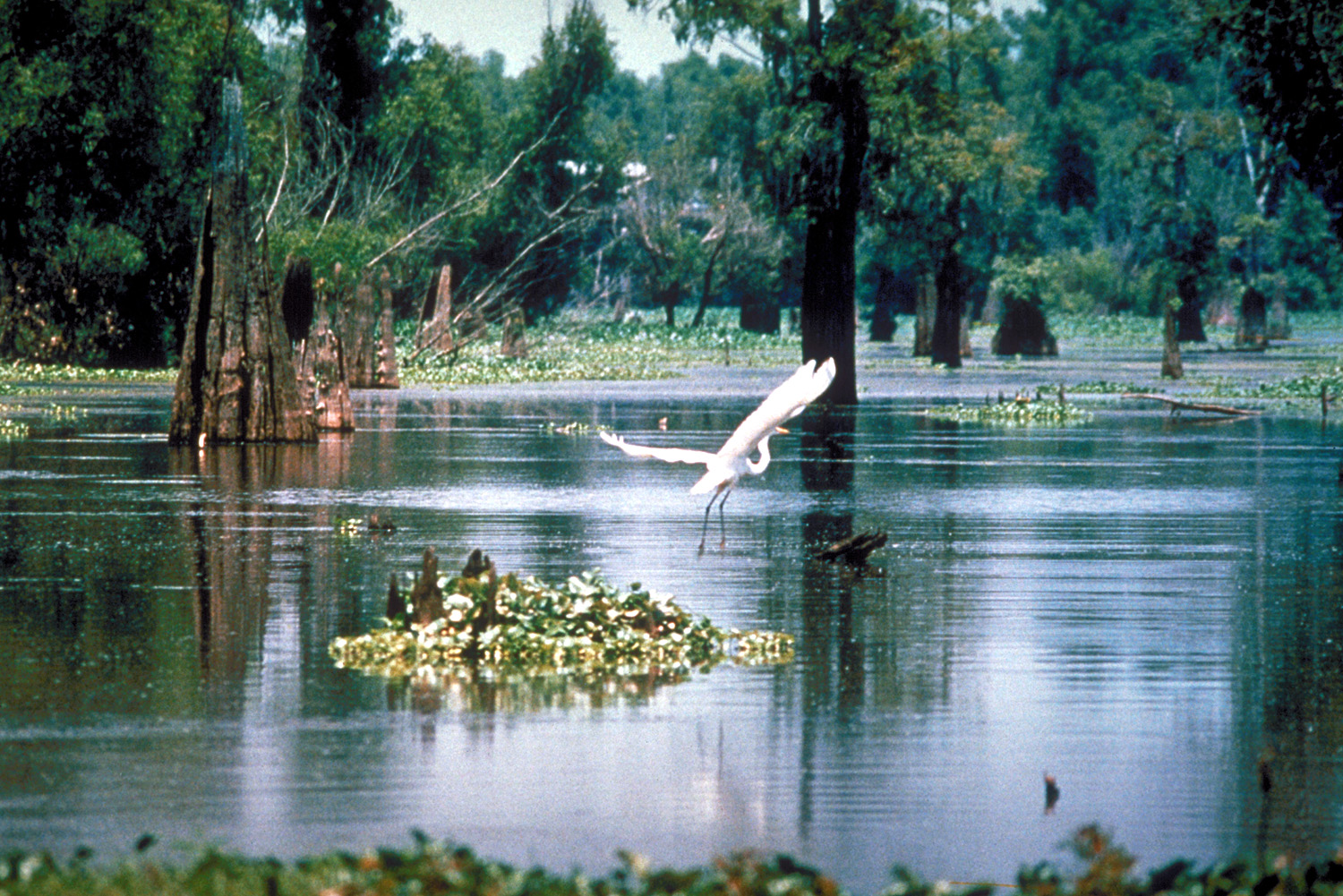
Atchafalaya Basin, Louisiana

The National Wildlife refuge system began in 1903, by executive order of President Theodore Roosevelt, with the designation of Pelican Island National Wildlife Refuge in Florida. The Atchafalaya NWR became part of a system that includes more than 150 million acres (610,000 km^{2}) in 552 national wildlife refuges, along with other units of the refuge system, and 37 wetland management districts. The refuge was established in 1986, to provide for 1) conservation and management of all fish and wildlife within the refuge, 2) to fulfill the international treaty obligations of the United States with respect to fish and wildlife, and 3) to provide opportunities for scientific research, environmental education, and fish and wildlife oriented recreation, including hunting, fishing and trapping, birdwatching, nature photography, and others.

== Wildlife and habitat ==
The refuge is encompassed within 1,500,000 acres (6,100 km^{2}) of hardwood swamps, lakes and bayous. The natural floodplain of the Atchafalaya River flows for 140 miles (230 km) south from its junction with the Mississippi River to the Gulf of Mexico. The basin's dense bottomland hardwoods, bald cypress-tupelo swamps, overflow lakes, and meandering bayous provide a tremendous diversity of habitat for more than 200 species of resident and migratory birds and numerous other wildlife and the area has been recognized as an Internationally Important Bird Area.

The basin's wooded wetlands also provide vital nesting habitat for wood duck, and support the nation's largest concentration of American woodcock. Bald eagles, ospreys, swallow-tailed kites, and Mississippi kites can occasionally be seen soaring overhead. Wild turkeys, white-tailed deer, eastern gray and fox squirrels, eastern cottontail, swamp rabbit, gray and red fox, coyote, striped skunk, and Virginia opossum inhabit the refuge, as do a small remnant population of Louisiana black bears. Furbearers found in this great swamp are raccoon, mink, bobcat, coypu, muskrat, North American river otter, and American beaver.

The lifeblood of the fishery is the basin's annual flooding and dewatering cycle. Overflows occur during the winter and spring rains, with many areas gradually becoming dewatered during the summer and fall. Sportfishing is popular throughout the basin. Largemouth bass, white crappie, black crappie, warmouth, bluegill, redear sunfish, and channel catfish are the primary species sought. More than 85 species of fish occur in the basin, and their populations frequently exceed 1,000 pounds per acre (100 g/m^{2}). Red swamp and white river crayfish are also important for both a sport and commercial harvest.

=== Refuge area ===
The combined area of the refuge, totaling 44,000 acres (180 km^{2}), classified as bottomland hardwoods, contains four dominant tree species associations: (1) cottonwood and sycamore, (2) oak, gum (American sweetgum or redgum), hackberry (sugarberry or sugar hackberry), ash (swamp or water ash), (3) willow (black willow), bald cypress, pumpkin ash, (4) overcup oak, and bitter pecan or water hickory.

== Flood of 2011 ==
Due to the flooding of the Mississippi River and the opening of the Morganza Floodway the refuge was closed to the public May 14, 2011. This was the first time since 1973, and prior to the refuge opening, that the Mississippi was diverted through the basin. Although most of the refuge remains closed the South Farm (Iberville Parish) portion of the Sherburne WMA was open July 1, 2011, to walk-in and ATV traffic. The rest of the area will be closed until further notice.

== See also ==
- Sherburne Complex Wildlife Management Area, a state-managed protected area which is partly coextensive, partly adjacent with Atchafalaya NWR
- Atchafalaya Basin
- Mississippi Alluvial_Plain (ecoregion): Inland Swamps (73n)
- List of National Wildlife Refuges: Louisiana
