= Interstate 10 in Louisiana =

Highway in Louisiana

Interstate 10
- I-10 highlighted in red

Route information
- Maintained by Louisiana DOTD
- Length: 274.42 mi (441.64 km)
- Existed: 1957–present
- History: Completed in 1978
- NHS: Entire route

Major junctions
- West end: I-10 / US 90 at the Texas state line in Orange, TX
- I-210 in Lake Charles; I-49 / US 167 / LA 182 in Lafayette; I-110 in Baton Rouge; I-12 in Baton Rouge; I-55 near LaPlace; I-310 near Kenner; I-610 in New Orleans; US 90 / Future I-49 / I-910 in New Orleans; US 11 in New Orleans; I-12 / I-59 near Slidell
- East end: I-10 at the Mississippi state line near Slidell

Location
- Country: United States
- State: Louisiana
- Parishes: Calcasieu, Jefferson Davis, Acadia, Lafayette, St. Martin, Iberville, West Baton Rouge, East Baton Rouge, Ascension, St. James, St. John the Baptist, St. Charles, Jefferson, Orleans, St. Tammany

Highway system
- Interstate Highway System; Main; Auxiliary; Suffixed; Business; Future; Louisiana State Highway System; Interstate; US; State; Scenic
← LA 9	→ LA 10
← LA 3026	3027	→ LA 3028

Interstate 10 (I-10), is a major transcontinental Interstate Highway in the Southern United States that runs across the southern part of Louisiana for 274.42 miles (441.64 km) from Texas to Mississippi. It passes through Lake Charles, Lafayette, and Baton Rouge, dips south of Lake Pontchartrain to serve the New Orleans metropolitan area, then crosses Lake Pontchartrain and goes into Mississippi.

== Route description ==
I-10 enters Louisiana at the state's southwestern corner from Orange, Texas, in a concurrency with US Route 90 (US 90), which leaves the freeway at the first exit. The two routes closely parallel each other through much of the state. The first community I-10 approaches in the state is Vinton. Between Sulphur and Lake Charles there is an interchange with I-210. I-10 crosses the Calcasieu River Bridge into Lake Charles, passing north of the center of town, before meeting the western end of I-210. Between Lake Charles and Lafayette, I-10 bypasses several small towns including Iowa, Welsh, Jennings, and Crowley. In Lafayette, I-10 meets the current southern terminus of I-49, leaving northwest out of the city and passing by the community of Breaux Bridge.

From Lafayette, the highway heads east-northeast toward Baton Rouge via the Atchafalaya Swamp Freeway, an 18.2-mile (29.3 km) bridge across the Atchafalaya River and its accompanying swamp. Between the two cities, I-10 parallels US 190, from Opelousas to Baton Rouge. This route has signs and is designated as an alternate I-10 bypass that runs from I-10/I-49 north to US 190 (exit 19B at Opelousas) then east across to Baton Rouge and back down to I-10 via I-110 south. Traffic can be diverted both ways along this route should there be the necessity to close I-10 across the Atchafalaya Swamp Freeway and is also used as a hurricane evacuation route.

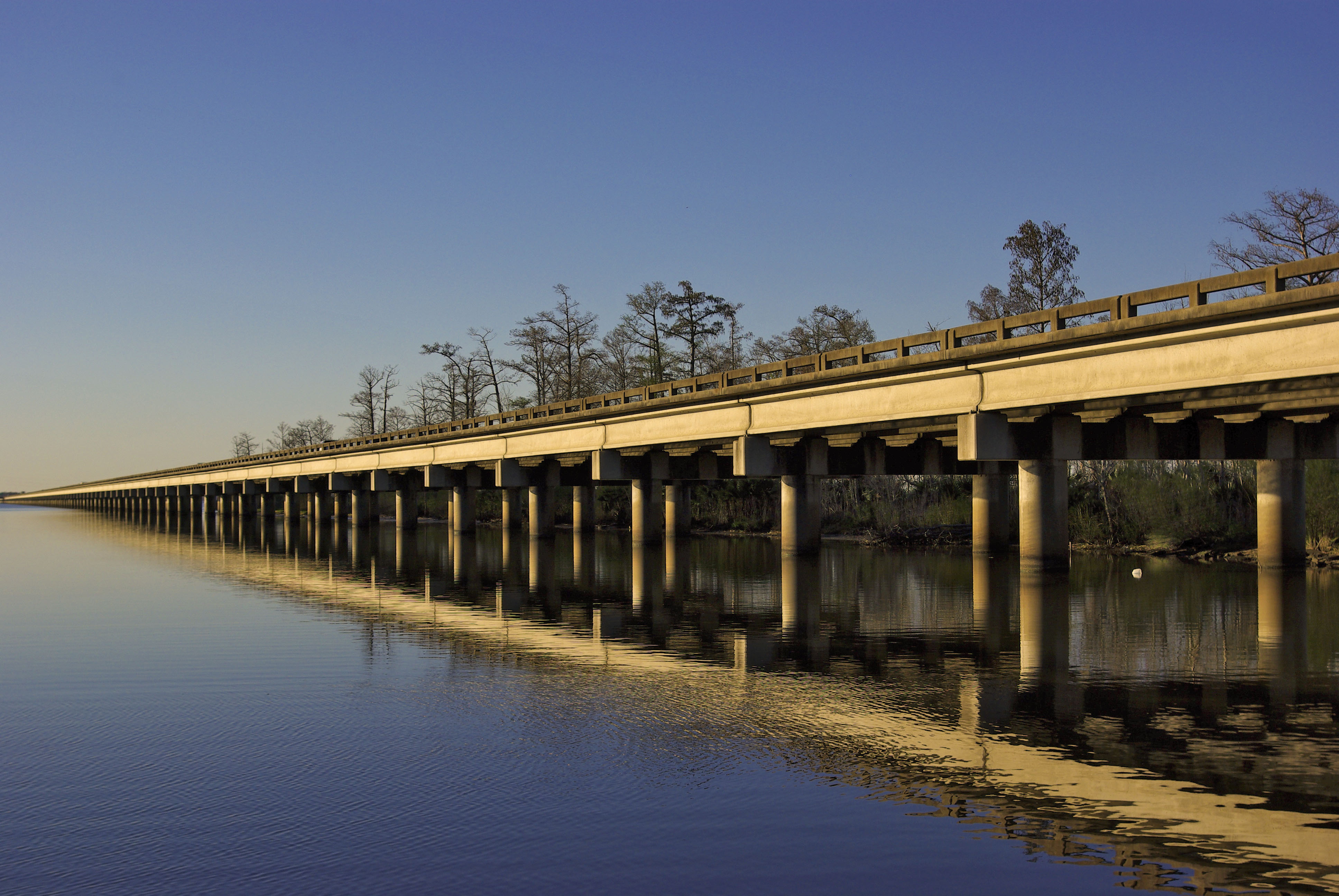
I-10 running west of New Orleans, spanning the Bonnet Carre Spillway at Lake Pontchartrain

In the capital of Baton Rouge, US 190 continues east alongside I-12 to Hammond and Slidell while I-10 turns southeastward and parallels US 61 (Airline Highway) to New Orleans. In the Crescent City, I-10 rejoins US 90 (and later US 11) as it heads toward Slidell. In Slidell, US 11 continues northeastward toward Hattiesburg, Mississippi, while I-10 and US 90 turn eastward toward coastal Mississippi.

Major bridges on I-10 in Louisiana include the Sabine River Bridge (c. 1952, replaced 2003), the Lake Charles I-10 Bridge (1952), the Atchafalaya Swamp Freeway (1973), the Horace Wilkinson Bridge over the Mississippi River (1968), the Bonnet Carré Spillway Bridge (c. 1972), the Industrial Canal Bridge (c. 1960), Frank Davis "Naturally N'Awlins" Memorial Bridge (1965, replaced 2010), and the Pearl River Bridge (c. 1970).

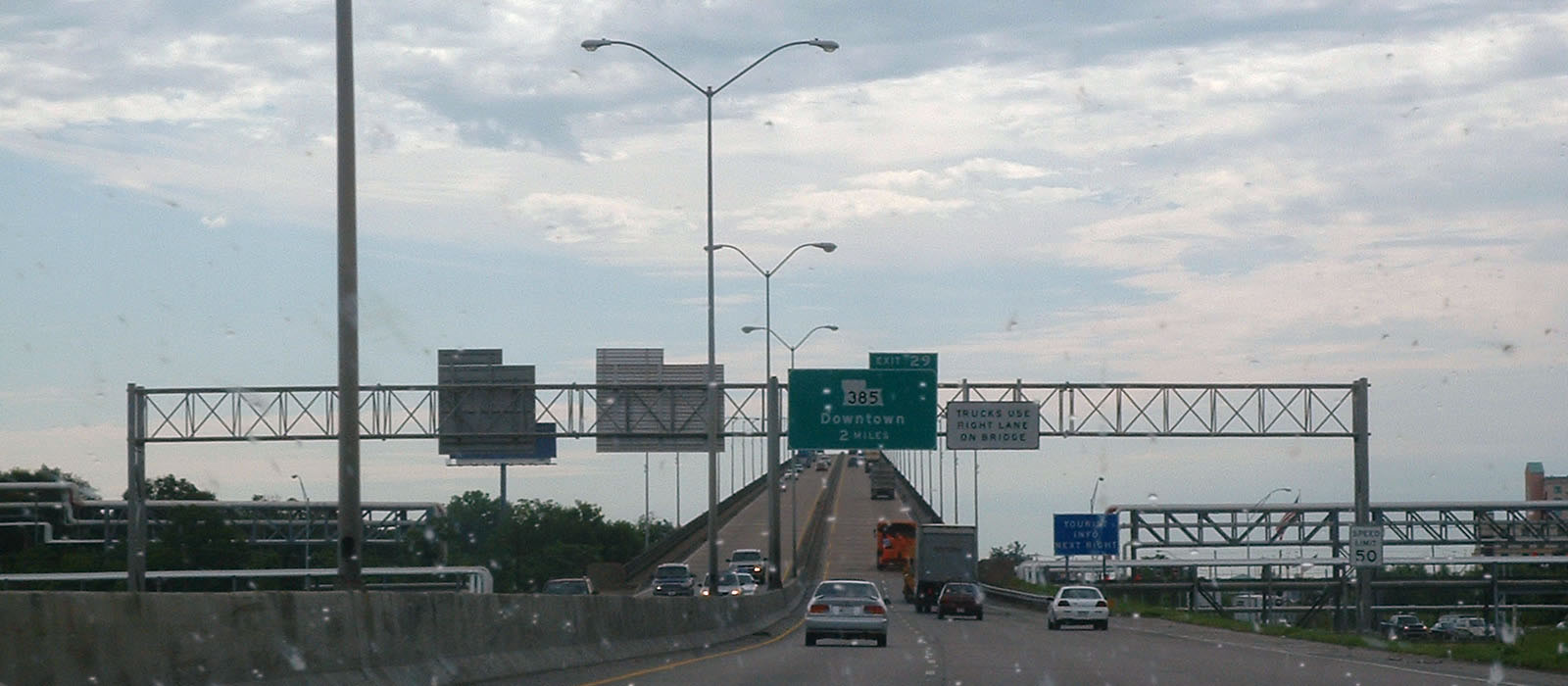
I-10 eastbound passing over Lake Charles/Calcasieu River near Lake Charles

== History ==
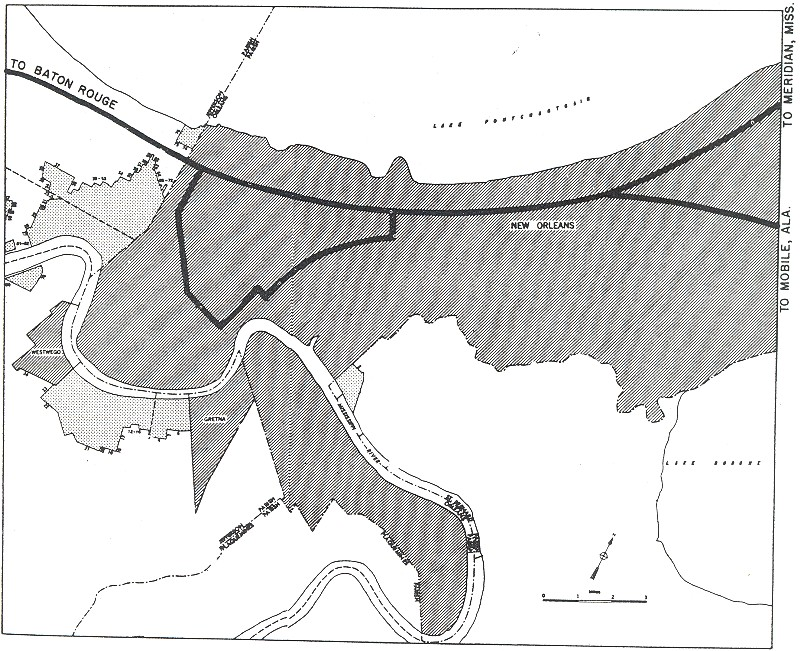
Until around 1960, I-10 and I-59 would have split near the present I-510 interchange in eastern New Orleans.

By the beginning of planning for the Interstate Highway System in 1939 (then called the Interregional Highway System), the Houston–New Orleans–Mobile corridor was part of the system. Preliminary plans took it along US 90 all the way through Louisiana, serving Lake Charles and Lafayette but not Baton Rouge. By c. 1943, it had been shifted to the north west of New Orleans, using the Louisiana Highway 12 (LA 12), US 190, and US 61 corridors, and serving Baton Rouge but not Lake Charles or Lafayette. The 1947 plan shifted it to roughly the current alignment, including the long stretch of new corridor across the Atchafalaya Swamp. The corridor was assigned the I-10 designation in mid-1957.

Prior to the gaining of federal funding for the Interstate System in the late 1950s, a toll road, the Acadian Thruway, had been proposed between Lafayette and a point near Gramercy on Airline Highway (US 61). This would have provided a shorter route than I-10, bypassing Baton Rouge to the south. The Gramercy Bridge was later built along its planned alignment, with LA 3125 connecting to Gramercy, but no road extends west from the bridge across the Atchafalaya Swamp to Lafayette.

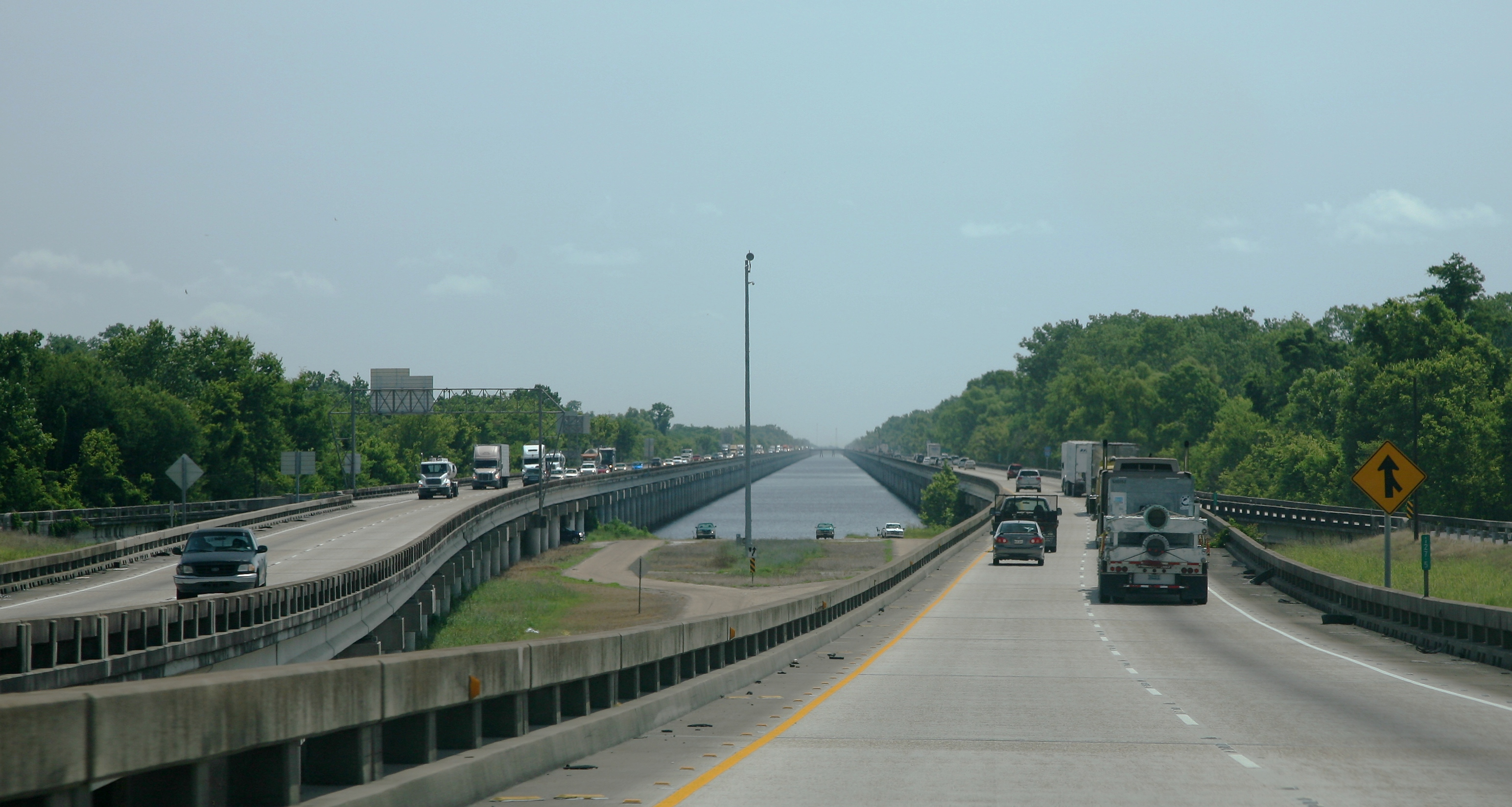
Atchafalaya Swamp Freeway in Iberville Parish

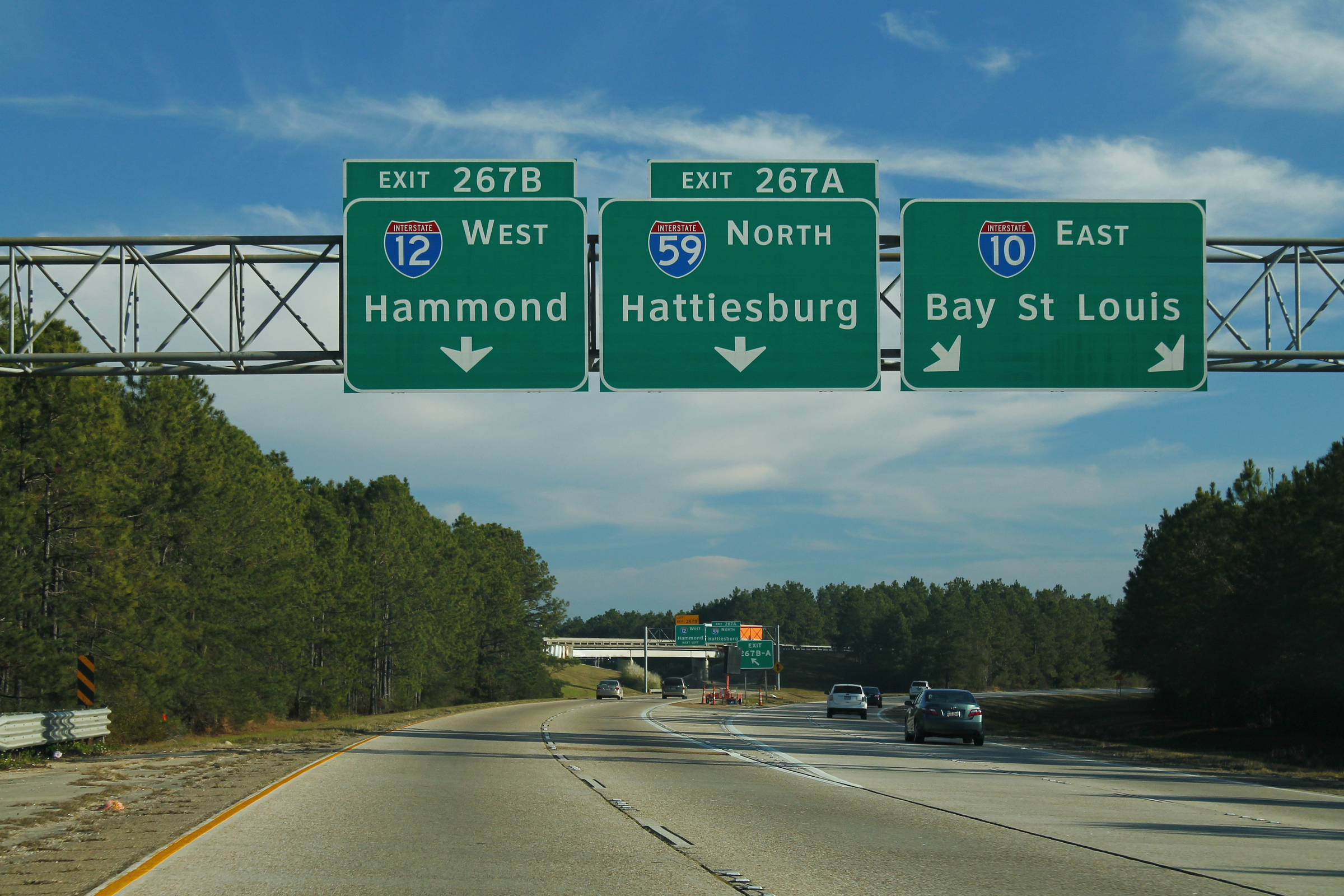
Interchange between I-10, I-12, and I-59 in Slidell

I-12, serving as a bypass of New Orleans around the north side of Lake Pontchartrain, was not added until October 17, 1957. At the time, I-10 and I-59 split in eastern New Orleans, with I-59 following present I-10 and I-10 following the US 90 corridor into Mississippi, and so I-12 only ran to I-59 north of Slidell. By the mid-1960s, the routes had been realigned to their current configuration, with I-12 and I-59 both ending at I-10 near Slidell.

Construction of the Interstate Highway System in Louisiana began in 1957. Early I-10 contracts were done under the route designation LA 3027. Much of the early construction on the I-10 corridor was concentrated on relieving traffic problems in urban centers. Several such projects were already underway and were incorporated into the route of I-10 during construction, such as the Pontchartrain Expressway in New Orleans. In addition, the two major bridges on the route in Calcasieu Parish between the Texas state line and Lake Charles were built for US 90 in the early 1950s and retrofitted for I-10 traffic. Sections of I-10 through rural areas and/or those sections already served adequately by existing highways, such as Airline Highway (US 61) between Baton Rouge and New Orleans, were constructed later in the program. By the spring of 1975, the entire route of I-10 had been opened across Louisiana except for a problem 5.5-mile (8.9 km) section between Gonzales and Sorrento that was not completed for another three years.

=== Timeline ===
Segment	Year opened
Sabine River Bridge (Texas-Louisiana state line)	Existing US 90 bridge opened May 11, 1954
Sabine River to Vinton	Existing US 90 opened May 11, 1954; upgraded to interstate standards and opened February 24, 1967
Vinton to Sulphur	September 21, 1965
Sulphur to Westlake	April 16, 1962
Calcasieu River Bridge (Westlake-Lake Charles)	Existing US 90 bridge, opened September 28, 1951
Calcasieu River to US 171 (Lake Charles)	April 3, 1963
US 171 (Lake Charles) to US 165 (Iowa)	February 17, 1964
US 165 (Iowa) to Welsh	December 9, 1964
Welsh to Jennings	Spring 1965
Jennings to Crowley	March 28, 1963
Crowley to Duson	December 19, 1966
Duson to US 167 (Lafayette)	October 30, 1968
US 167 (Lafayette) to Grosse Tete (including Atchafalaya Basin Bridge)	March 12, 1973
Grosse Tete to Lobdell	March 28, 1974
Lobdell to Port Allen	November 7, 1970
Baton Rouge Mississippi River Bridge (Port Allen-Baton Rouge)	April 10, 1968
Baton Rouge Mississippi River to Perkins Road	September 18, 1964
Baton Rouge Perkins Road to College Drive	October 1965
Baton Rouge: College Drive to Highland Road	May 31, 1974
Highland Road to Gonzales	December 19, 1974
Gonzales to Sorrento	May 5, 1978
Sorrento to LaPlace	April 16, 1975
Laplace to Williams Boulevard (Kenner) (including Bonnet Carré Spillway Bridge)	December 17, 1971
Jefferson Parish: Williams Boulevard to Veterans Highway (Metairie)	May 17, 1968
Jefferson Parish: Veterans Memorial Boulevard to Causeway Boulevard (Metairie)	December 1967
Jefferson Parish: Causeway Boulevard Metairie to Pontchartrain Expressway (New Orleans)	March 26, 1965
New Orleans: Pontchartrain Expressway from Florida Avenue to Mound Avenue	October 4, 1962
New Orleans: Pontchartrain Expressway from Mound Avenue to Airline Highway (US 61)	February 16, 1962
New Orleans: Pontchartrain Expressway from Airline Highway (US 61) to Claiborne Avenue (US 90)	February 19, 1960
New Orleans: Claiborne Expressway from Pontchartrain Expressway to Tulane Avenue	December 8, 1972
New Orleans: Claiborne Expressway from Tulane Avenue to Orleans Avenue	June 16, 1969
New Orleans: Claiborne Expressway from Orleans Avenue to St. Bernard Avenue	March 14, 1968
New Orleans: Claiborne Expressway from St. Bernard Avenue to Franklin Avenue	February 27, 1968
New Orleans: Claiborne Expressway from Franklin Avenue to Industrial Canal	April 1966
New Orleans: Industrial Canal Bridge	December 21, 1965
New Orleans: Industrial Canal to Morrison Road	December 8, 1966
New Orleans: Morrison Road to Paris Road	October 18, 1972
New Orleans: Paris Road to US 11	April 24, 1967
US 11 (New Orleans) to I-12/I-59 (Slidell) (including Lake Pontchartrain Twin Span Bridge)	December 21, 1965
I-12/I-59 (Slidell) to East Pearl River	February 16, 1971
Pearl River Bridge (Louisiana-Mississippi state line)	February 16, 1971

Reconstruction of the portion at the I-610 Split vicinity was undertaken in the late 1990s. Also in the late 1990s, further work was done on the expressway as two ramps were constructed, connecting West I-10 to West Business U.S. 90 and westbound Claiborne Avenue (West US 90), replacing an earlier, more dangerous ramp. The direct ramp from 90B East to I-10 East was completed by 1989.

In the aftermath of Hurricane Katrina, the I-10 Twin Span Bridge, a portion of I-10 between New Orleans and Slidell, spanning the eastern end of Lake Pontchartrain, was severely damaged, causing a break in I-10 at that point. Unlike the Escambia Bay Bridge (east of Pensacola, Florida and damaged by Hurricane Ivan), which is a major artery, I-12 is available to bypass New Orleans. Taking I-12 to the Lake Pontchartrain Causeway allowed entry and exit to and from the Greater New Orleans area from the East. On October 14, 2005, at 3:00 pm, the eastbound span was reopened to two way traffic. On January 6, 2006, at 6:00 am, both lanes of the westbound span were reopened to traffic using temporary metal trusses and road panels to replace damaged sections. This restored all four lanes of the I-10 Twin Span for normal traffic with a 45 mph (72 km/h) speed limit for the westbound lanes and 60 mph (97 km/h) for the eastbound lanes. Oversized and overweight traffic was prohibited until a new permanent six-lane span replaced the two temporarily repaired spans. The eastbound span opened to traffic on July 9, 2009, and the westbound span opened on April 7, 2010, with the old bridge being permanently closed. The approaches to the westbound lanes were completed with a ribbon cutting ceremony on September 8, 2011, and the opening of all six lanes the next morning. The old Twin Span will be demolished in the near future. In 2014, the Louisiana State Legislature officially named the Twin Span as the Frank Davis "Naturally N'Awlins" Memorial Bridge.

A $68.9 million three-year construction project was completed between Causeway Boulevard and the 17th Street Canal in Metairie, Louisiana. It added new lanes in both directions and improve the exit and entrance ramps at Causeway and Bonnabel Boulevard.

In 2012, the state completed a widening project between Causeway and Clearview Parkway and between the I-10/I-610 split and Airline Highway (US 61). In 2015, the additional lanes were extended in Metairie, from Clearview Parkway west to Veterans Boulevard.

I-10 was widened to three lanes in each direction from the I-10/I-12 split to Highland Road (exit 166) from late 2008 to spring 2013.

On April 8, 2017, Louisiana DOTD broke ground on the reconstruction of seven miles (11 km) of I-10 between I-49 (exit 103) and the Atchafalaya Basin. A center concrete barrier was constructed, the road was repaved, and an extra travel lane was constructed, making I-10 three lanes in each direction. Construction began May 2017, was completed in October 2021, and had a ribbon cutting ceremony on November 22, 2021.

In order to reduce the amount of congestion for travelers trying to reach the Louis Armstrong New Orleans International Airport, flyover ramps were constructed at the I-10 and Loyola Drive Interchange in Kenner. Part of the project is constructing a diverging diamond interchange where both of the roads meet as well. The project connected I-10 to the new terminal at the airport that was completed in November 2019 and allowed quick access to a planned station on the proposed Baton Rouge–New Orleans Amtrak route on the south side of the airport. Construction began after the terminal was completed and was expected to be completed in November 2022. However, supply chain problems and the damage caused by Hurricane Ida in 2021 delayed the completion of the project to early-2023. Rainy weather during the Summer of 2022 further delayed the completion of the project to the Summer of 2023. Work on the diverging diamond interchange, which will be the first ever constructed in the state, was not to be started until the completion of the flyover bridges. The I-10 westbound ramp to Loyola Drive was finally opened to traffic on September 29, 2023; the ramp from the airport to I-10 east opened two weeks later on October 13. The diverging diamond opened on October 30.

== Future ==
There are calls to remove I-10 from the Claiborne Expressway in New Orleans and rename I-610 to I-10. The entire length of the Pontchartrain Expressway would likely be renamed as I-910 or I-49. The movement to remove the expressway received backing from President Biden in April 2021. However, opponents of the removal, which could cost over $4 billion, pointed out that removing the road would increase and worsen traffic through the area as well as in other neighborhoods among other things. Instead, in October 2022, the governments of Louisiana and New Orleans introduced a $94.7 million proposal to improve the elevated freeway and the space beneath it as well remove four ramps in Tremé. They proposal asked for a $47 million grant for the project.

In 2022, the Calcasieu River Bridge turned 70 years old. With over 600,000 bridges, the average bridge age in the United States is 42 years old, with one in nine rated as deficient. Louisiana has a total of 13,050 bridges, and 1,827 out of those 13,050 (14%) are considered deficient. 1,963 bridges (15%) are considered functionally obsolete. It had been decided the bridge needed replacing since before 2002. There are several areas of concern including the age of the bridge, the low bridge ratings, steep grades, traffic congestion, amount of traffic that has been estimated at around 55,000 vehicles a day, low vertical traffic clearance, and contamination. These contributing factors rank the bridge as "a dangerous bridge" and 7th in the nation in need of replacing. In 2023, a plan was vetoed on the replacement bridge due to tolls being proposed. This made the project on hold until 2024 when a plan was approved that would include tolls, with especially high prices for trucks.

== Exit list ==
Parish	Location	mi	km	Exit	Destinations	Notes
Sabine River		0.00	0.00		I-10 west / US 90 west – Beaumont, Houston	Continuation into Orange, Texas
Sabine River		0.00– 0.5	0.00– 0.80	Louisiana–Texas line		
Calcasieu		0.6	0.97	1	Sabine River Turnaround	Westbound exit and eastbound entrance
Calcasieu	Toomey	4.0– 4.4	6.4– 7.1	4	US 90 east to LA 109 – Toomey, Starks	East end of US 90 concurrency
Calcasieu	Vinton	7.4– 7.8	11.9– 12.6	7	LA 3063 – Vinton	Southern terminus of LA 3063
Calcasieu	Vinton	8.7– 9.3	14.0– 15.0	8	LA 108 – Vinton	Western terminus of LA 108
Calcasieu	Sulphur	20.3– 21.0	32.7– 33.8	20	LA 1256 to LA 27 – Sulphur, Cameron	Northern terminus of LA 1256
Calcasieu	Sulphur	21.4– 21.9	34.4– 35.2	21	LA 27 – DeQuincy	
Calcasieu	Sulphur	23.4– 23.9	37.7– 38.5	23	LA 108 – Industries, Sulphur	
Calcasieu		24.9– 25.7	40.1– 41.4	25	I-210 east (Lake Charles By-Pass)	Western terminus of I-210 (exit 1 on I-210)
Calcasieu		26.1– 27.1	42.0– 43.6	26	US 90 west / PPG Drive / Trousdale Road	West end of US 90 concurrency; eastbound signed as "PPG Drive" only
Calcasieu	Westlake	27.7– 28.0	44.6– 45.1	27	LA 378 – Westlake	Westbound exit closed due to construction; southern terminus of LA 378
Calcasieu	Calcasieu River	28.0– 29.3	45.1– 47.2	Louisiana Memorial World War II Bridge		
Calcasieu	Lake Charles	29.5– 30.2	47.5– 48.6	29	LA 1262 (Lakeshore Drive) – Downtown Area	Northern terminus of LA 1262; signed as exit 30A westbound
Calcasieu	Lake Charles	30.4– 30.7	48.9– 49.4	30B	Ryan Street – Downtown Area	Eastbound entrance and westbound exit
Calcasieu	Lake Charles	31.0– 31.5	49.9– 50.7	31A	US 90 Bus. (Enterprise Boulevard)	Western terminus of US 90 Bus.; additional westbound entrance from Kirkman Street
Calcasieu	Lake Charles	31.7– 32.0	51.0– 51.5	31B	US 90 east to LA 14 Shattuck Street	Eastbound signage; east end of US 90 concurrency Westbound signage
Calcasieu	Lake Charles	32.4– 32.7	52.1– 52.6	32	Opelousas Street	No eastbound entrance
Calcasieu	Lake Charles	32.7– 33.3	52.6– 53.6	33	US 171 north – DeRidder, Shreveport To LA 14 – Cameron	Access to LA 14 via US 171 south; LA 14 not signed eastbound; eastbound access to US 171 south via exit 32
Calcasieu		33.8– 34.4	54.4– 55.4	34	I-210 west (Lake Charles By-Pass)	Eastern terminus of I-210 (exit 12 on I-210)
Calcasieu		35.8– 36.4	57.6– 58.6	36	LA 397 – Creole, Cameron	
Calcasieu	Iowa	42.8– 43.1	68.9– 69.4	43	LA 383 – Iowa	
Jefferson Davis		44.3– 44.6	71.3– 71.8	44	US 165 – Kinder, Alexandria	
Jefferson Davis	Lacassine	47.9– 48.2	77.1– 77.6	48	LA 101 – Lacassine	
Jefferson Davis	Welsh	54.3– 54.6	87.4– 87.9	54	LA 99 – Welsh	
Jefferson Davis	Roanoke	59.1– 59.5	95.1– 95.8	59	LA 395 – Roanoke	
Jefferson Davis	Jennings	63.6– 64.1	102.4– 103.2	64	LA 26 – Elton, Jennings	
Jefferson Davis	Jennings	65.7– 66.1	105.7– 106.4	65	LA 97 – Evangeline, Jennings	
Acadia		71.8– 72.2	115.6– 116.2	72	Egan	To LA 91/LA 100 via Trumps Road (not signed)
Acadia		75.8– 76.2	122.0– 122.6	76	LA 91 – Iota, Estherwood	
Acadia	Crowley	80.4– 81.0	129.4– 130.4	80	LA 13 – Eunice, Crowley	
Acadia	Crowley	81.8– 82.3	131.6– 132.4	82	LA 1111 – East Crowley	
Acadia	Rayne	87.5– 88.0	140.8– 141.6	87	LA 35 / LA 98 – Church Point, Rayne	
Acadia	Duson	92.2– 92.6	148.4– 149.0	92	LA 95 – Mire, Duson	
Lafayette	Scott	97.3– 97.7	156.6– 157.2	97	LA 93 – Cankton, Scott	
Lafayette	Lafayette	99.7– 100.2	160.5– 161.3	100	US 167 (Ambassador Caffery Parkway) / LA 3184	Northern terminus of LA 3184
Lafayette	Lafayette	101.6– 102.2	163.5– 164.5	101	LA 182 north (North University Avenue)	West end of LA 182 concurrency
Lafayette	Lafayette	102.9– 103.5	165.6– 166.6	103	I-49 north / US 167 north / LA 182 south to US 90 – Opelousas, Morgan City	Current southern terminus and exits 1A-B on I-49; east end of LA 182 concurrency; signed as exits 103A (south) and 103B (north)
Lafayette	Lafayette	104.1– 105.0	167.5– 169.0	104	Louisiana Avenue	
St. Martin	Breaux Bridge	109.4– 109.9	176.1– 176.9	109	LA 328 – Breaux Bridge	
St. Martin		114.6– 115.2	184.4– 185.4	115	LA 347 – Cecilia, Henderson	
St. Martin	Atchafalaya Basin	117.3	188.8	West end of Louisiana Airborne Memorial Bridge		
St. Martin	Atchafalaya Basin	121.4– 121.7	195.4– 195.9	121	LA 3177 – Butte LaRose	Northern terminus of LA 3177; to Atchafalaya Welcome Center
Iberville	Atchafalaya Basin	127.3– 127.6	204.9– 205.4	127	LA 975 – Whiskey Bay	Southern terminus of LA 975
Iberville	Atchafalaya Basin	135.1	217.4	East end of Louisiana Airborne Memorial Bridge		
Iberville	Ramah	135.2– 135.5	217.6– 218.1	135	LA 3000 – Ramah, Maringouin	Southern terminus of LA 3000; to LA 76 (not signed)
Iberville	Grosse Tête	139.3– 139.9	224.2– 225.1	139	LA 77 – Rosedale, Grosse Tete	
West Baton Rouge		151.1– 151.7	243.2– 244.1	151	LA 415 to US 190 – Lobdell	Southern terminus of LA 415
West Baton Rouge	Port Allen	153.2– 153.8	246.6– 247.5	153	LA 1 – Port Allen, Plaquemine	
Mississippi River		153.4– 155.0	246.9– 249.4	Horace Wilkinson Bridge		
East Baton Rouge	Baton Rouge	154.8	249.1	155A	LA 30 (Nicholson Drive) / Highland Road – LSU	Eastbound exit and westbound entrance
East Baton Rouge	Baton Rouge	155.1– 155.6	249.6– 250.4	155B	I-110 north – Downtown, Metro Airport	Southern terminus of I-110; exit 1I-J on I-110
East Baton Rouge	Baton Rouge	155.9	250.9	155C	Louise Street	Eastbound entrance and westbound exit
East Baton Rouge	Baton Rouge	156.2	251.4	156B	Dalrymple Drive – LSU	No eastbound entrance
East Baton Rouge	Baton Rouge	156.9– 157.1	252.5– 252.8	157A	Perkins Road	Eastbound exit and westbound entrance
East Baton Rouge	Baton Rouge	157.2– 157.7	253.0– 253.8	157B	Acadian Thruway (LA 427) – LSU	
East Baton Rouge	Baton Rouge	157.9– 158.3	254.1– 254.8	158	College Drive	
East Baton Rouge	Baton Rouge	159.3– 160.0	256.4– 257.5	159	I-12 east – Hammond	Western terminus of I-12 (exit 1A on I-12)
East Baton Rouge	Baton Rouge	160.4– 161.0	258.1– 259.1	160	LA 3064 (Essen Lane)	
East Baton Rouge	Baton Rouge	161.6– 163.3	260.1– 262.8	162	LA 1248 (Bluebonnet Boulevard); Mall of Louisiana Boulevard	Northern terminus of LA 1248; signed as exit 162A (LA 1248) and 162B (Mall of Louisiana Boulevard) both directions; exits combined westbound
East Baton Rouge		162.9– 163.8	262.2– 263.6	163	LA 3246 (Siegen Lane)	
East Baton Rouge				165	Pecue Lane	Diverging diamond interchange opened on February 18, 2026
East Baton Rouge	Kleinpeter	166.5– 167.1	268.0– 268.9	166	LA 42 (Highland Road); LA 427 (Perkins Road)	
Ascension	Prairieville	172.6– 173.2	277.8– 278.7	173	Old Jefferson Highway (LA 73) – Prairieville, Geismar	
Ascension	Gonzales	177.2– 177.9	285.2– 286.3	177	LA 30 – Gonzales, St. Gabriel	
Ascension	Gonzales	179.3– 180.0	288.6– 289.7	179	LA 44 – Gonzales, Burnside	
Ascension	Sorrento	182.3– 183.0	293.4– 294.5	182	LA 22 – Sorrento, Donaldsonville	
Ascension		186.9	300.8	187	US 61 south (Airline Highway) – Gramercy	Eastbound exit and westbound entrance
Ascension		187.5	301.8	187	US 61 north (Airline Highway) – Sorrento	Westbound exit and eastbound entrance
St. James		194.5– 195.1	313.0– 314.0	194	LA 641 south – Gramercy, Lutcher	Northern terminus of LA 641
St. John the Baptist	LaPlace	205.6– 206.3	330.9– 332.0	206	LA 3188 south – LaPlace	Northern terminus of LA 3188
St. John the Baptist	LaPlace	209.1– 209.8	336.5– 337.6	209	US 51 to I-55 north – Hammond, LaPlace	To I-55 signed eastbound only
St. John the Baptist	Bonnet Carré Spillway	209.2	336.7	West end of I-10 Bonnet Carré Spillway Bridge		
St. John the Baptist	Bonnet Carré Spillway	210.1	338.1	210	I-55 north – Hammond	Southern terminus of I-55 (exit 1 on I-55); eastbound entrance and westbound exit
St. Charles	Bonnet Carré Spillway	219.6– 220.8	353.4– 355.3	220	I-310 south – Boutte, Houma	Northern terminus and exits 1-1A on I-310
Jefferson	Bonnet Carré Spillway	221.1	355.8	East end of I-10 Bonnet Carré Spillway Bridge		
Jefferson	Kenner	221.2– 222.0	356.0– 357.3	221	Loyola Drive / N. O. Int'l Airport	Signed as exit 221A (N. O. Int'l Airport) and 221B (Loyola Drive) westbound; exits combined eastbound
Jefferson	Kenner	223.1– 224.0	359.0– 360.5	223	LA 49 (Williams Boulevard) / 32nd Street; Economy Airport Parking / Consolidated Auto Rental	Signed as exit 223A to Williams Boulevard /32nd Street and 223B to Airport; 32nd Street (westbound exit only), Airport (eastbound entrance and westbound exit)
Jefferson	Metairie	224.5– 224.7	361.3– 361.6	224	Power Boulevard	Eastbound entrance (from southbound Power Boulevard) and westbound exit
Jefferson	Metairie	224.9– 225.5	361.9– 362.9	225	Veterans Boulevard	
Jefferson	Metairie	226.5– 227.2	364.5– 365.6	226	Clearview Parkway (LA 3152 south) – Huey Long Bridge	Northern terminus of unsigned LA 3152; westbound exit to northbound Clearview Parkway also includes direct ramp onto Frontage Road
Jefferson	Metairie	228.1– 229.0	367.1– 368.5	228	Causeway Boulevard – Mandeville Bonnabel Boulevard	To Mandeville via Lake Pontchartrain Causeway
Jefferson	Metairie	229.5– 229.7	369.3– 369.7	229	Bonnabel Boulevard	Eastbound access is part of exit 228
Jefferson–Orleans parish line	Metairie–New Orleans line	230.3– 231.1	370.6– 371.9	230	I-610 east – Slidell	Western terminus of I-610 (exit 1B on I-610); no westbound exit
Jefferson–Orleans parish line	Metairie–New Orleans line	230.3– 231.1	370.6– 371.9	North end of Pontchartrain Expressway		
Orleans	New Orleans	230.7– 231.1	371.3– 371.9	231B	Florida Boulevard / West End Boulevard	West End Boulevard is a one-way street; westbound exit only
Orleans	New Orleans	230.7– 231.1	371.3– 371.9	231B	Pontchartrain Boulevard	One-way street; eastbound entrance only
Orleans	New Orleans	231.3– 232.0	372.2– 373.4	231A	Metairie Road (LA 611-9 west) / City Park Avenue	Eastern terminus of unsigned LA 611-9
Orleans	New Orleans	231.9– 233.3	373.2– 375.5	232	US 61 north (Airline Highway) US 61 south (Tulane Avenue); Carrollton Avenue	
Orleans	New Orleans	233.8– 234.1	376.3– 376.7	234A	To US 90 (Claiborne Avenue) / US 90 Bus. / Pontchartrain Expressway south – Superdome, Westbank	Eastbound exit and westbound entrance; Pontchartrain Expressway south is unsigned I-910
Orleans	New Orleans	234.3	377.1	234B	Poydras Street – Superdome	Eastbound exit and westbound entrance
Orleans	New Orleans	234.5– 234.8	377.4– 377.9	234C	US 90 west (Claiborne Avenue) US 90 Bus. west (Pontchartrain Expressway) – Westbank	Eastbound entrance and westbound exit; future southern terminus of I-49
Orleans	New Orleans	235.0	378.2	235B	Canal Street – Superdome	Eastbound entrance and westbound exit
Orleans	New Orleans	235.4– 235.9	378.8– 379.6	235A	Orleans Avenue – Vieux Carré	
Orleans	New Orleans	235.6	379.2	236A	Esplanade Avenue	Eastbound exit only
Orleans	New Orleans	236.0– 236.2	379.8– 380.1	236B	LA 39 (North Claiborne Avenue)	Northern terminus of LA 39; eastbound exit and westbound entrance
Orleans	New Orleans	236.4	380.4	236C	St. Bernard Avenue	Eastbound entrance and westbound exit
Orleans	New Orleans	236.7– 237.2	380.9– 381.7	237	Elysian Fields Avenue (LA 3021)	No eastbound entrance/exit connecting with southbound Elysian Fields Avenue or westbound entrance from northbound Elysian Fields Avenue
Orleans	New Orleans	238.0– 238.3	383.0– 383.5	238B	I-610 west – N.O. Int'l Airport, Baton Rouge	Eastern terminus of I-610; eastbound entrance and westbound exit
Orleans	New Orleans	238.0– 238.3	383.0– 383.5	238A	Franklin Avenue	Eastbound entrance and westbound exit
Orleans	New Orleans	238.5– 239.2	383.8– 385.0	239	Louisa Street / Almonaster Boulevard	Split into exits 239A (South/East) and 239B (North/West) eastbound; Almonaster Boulevard not signed westbound
Orleans	New Orleans	238.9– 240.2	384.5– 386.6	High Rise Bridge over Inner Harbor Navigation Canal (or Industrial Canal)		
Orleans	New Orleans	239.8– 240.0	385.9– 386.2	240A	Downman Road	Eastbound exit and westbound entrance
Orleans	New Orleans	240.4– 240.8	386.9– 387.5	240B	US 90 (Chef Highway)	
Orleans	New Orleans	241.5– 241.9	388.7– 389.3	241	Morrison Road (LA 1253 west)	Eastern terminus of unsigned LA 1253
Orleans	New Orleans	242.6– 243.0	390.4– 391.1	242	Crowder Boulevard	
Orleans	New Orleans	243.6– 244.2	392.0– 393.0	244	Read Boulevard	
Orleans	New Orleans	244.8– 245.3	394.0– 394.8	245	Bullard Avenue	
Orleans	New Orleans	246.3– 247.0	396.4– 397.5	246	I-510 / LA 47 south – Chalmette, NASA LA 47 north – Little Woods	Northern terminus of I-510 (exit 1A on I-510); signed as exit 246A (south) and 246B (north)
Orleans	New Orleans	247.9– 248.5	399.0– 399.9	248	Michoud Boulevard	
Orleans	New Orleans	249.3– 249.8	401.2– 402.0	249	Bayou Sauvage National Wildlife Refuge	Connecting road never constructed; would have provided access to the Bayou Sauvage National Wildlife Refuge
Orleans	New Orleans	250.7– 251.3	403.5– 404.4	251	Bayou Sauvage National Wildlife Refuge	Closed; serves gravel road open to authorized traffic only
Orleans	New Orleans	254.2– 254.9	409.1– 410.2	254	US 11 – North Shore, Irish Bayou	
Lake Pontchartrain		254.8– 260.4	410.1– 419.1	Frank Davis "Naturally N'Awlins" Memorial Bridge (or I-10 Twin Span Bridge)		
St. Tammany		260.9– 261.7	419.9– 421.2	261	Lakeshore, Oak Harbor	
St. Tammany	Slidell	263.2– 263.7	423.6– 424.4	263	LA 433 (Old Spanish Trail)	
St. Tammany	Slidell	264.8– 265.3	426.2– 427.0	265	US 190 Bus. (Fremaux Avenue)	
St. Tammany	Slidell	265.9– 266.4	427.9– 428.7	266	US 190 (Gause Boulevard)	
St. Tammany	Slidell	267.1– 268.2	429.9– 431.6	267	I-12 west / I-59 north – Hammond, Baton Rouge, Hattiesburg	Eastern terminus of I-12; exits 85A-C on I-12; southern terminus of I-59; exits 1B-C on I-59; signed as exits 267A (I-59) and 267B (I-12)
Pearl River		273.1– 273.6	439.5– 440.3	Louisiana–Mississippi line		
Pearl River		273.6	440.3		I-10 east – Bay St. Louis, Mobile	Continuation into Mississippi
1.000 mi = 1.609 km; 1.000 km = 0.621 mi: Closed/former; Concurrency terminus; Incomplete access; Unopened

== Auxiliary routes ==
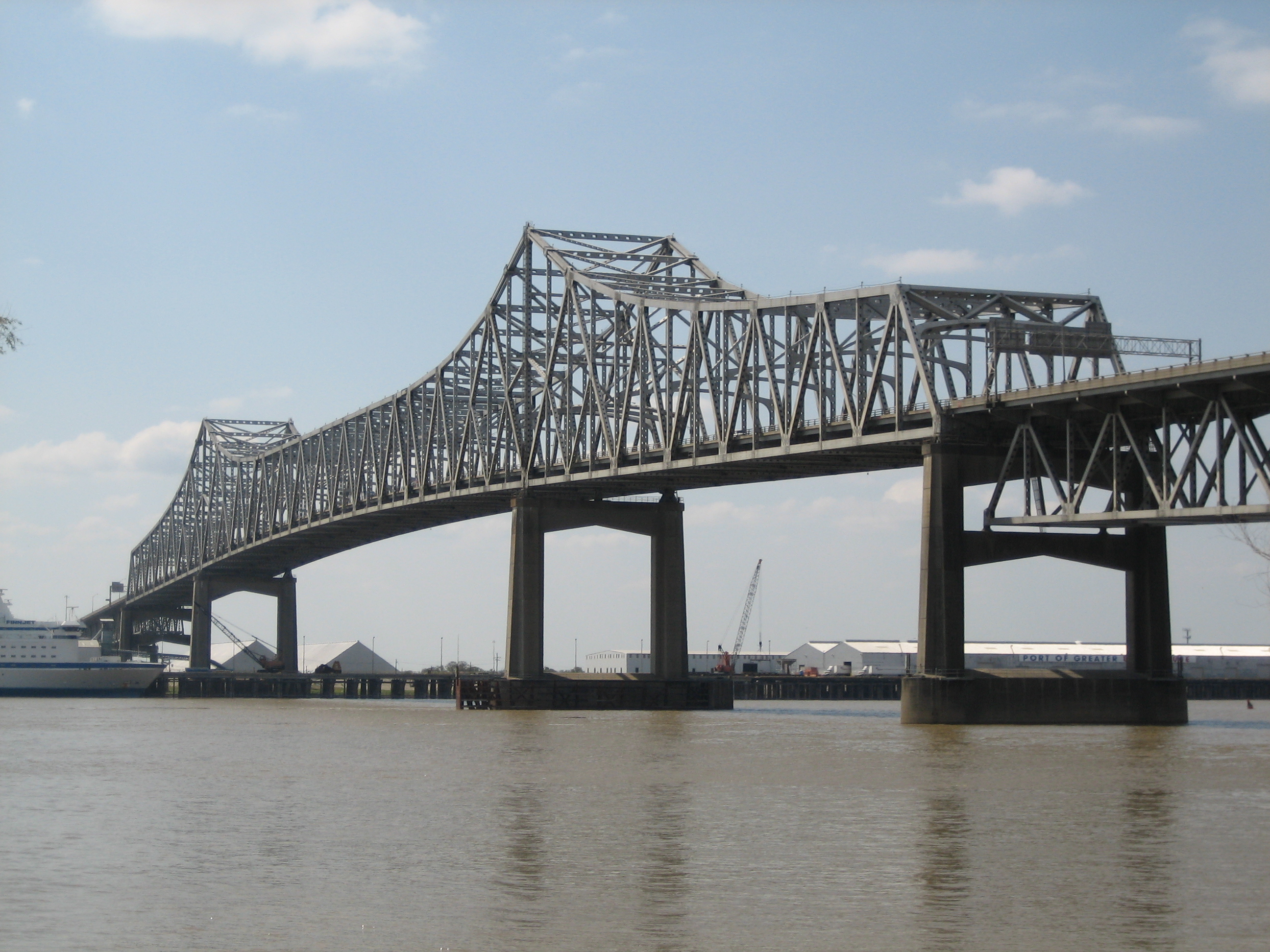
I-10 crossing the Mississippi River in Baton Rouge over the Horace Wilkinson Bridge

- I-110 is a spur northward through downtown Baton Rouge toward the northern part of the city. It was not in the original plans, but was added in the 1960s to replace the canceled I-410.
- I-210 is a bypass around the south side of Lake Charles. It was added in 1962.
- I-310 is a spur from I-10 west of New Orleans south to US 90 (future I-49). It was part of a longer I-410 from 1969 to 1977.
  - A previous I-310 was added in 1964 and canceled in 1969. It would've ran from I-10 east of downtown New Orleans south and southwest through the French Quarter to the Greater New Orleans Bridge.
- The first I-410 was a northern bypass of Baton Rouge along the Airline Highway (US 61/US 190) corridor. It was added in September 1955 and removed by the late 1960s.
  - The second I-410 was defined in 1969 as a southern bypass of New Orleans, as a sort of replacement for the canceled I-310. The southern section of I-410 was canceled in 1977, and the west and east legs became I-310 and I-510, respectively.
- I-510 is a spur from I-10 in eastern New Orleans south to the Paris Road Bridge over the Gulf Intracoastal Waterway (Mississippi River-Gulf Outlet Canal). It was part of a longer I-410 from 1969 to 1977.
- I-610 is a bypass for through traffic north of downtown New Orleans. It was added in September 1955.
- I-910 is a piece of future I-49 from downtown New Orleans south and west to Marrero. The temporary designation was assigned by the Federal Highway Administration and American Association of State Highway Officials in 1999, but is not signed and has not been accepted by the Louisiana Department of Transportation and Development.

== See also ==
- Airline Highway

Interstate 10
Previous state: Texas	Louisiana	Next state: Mississippi
