= U.S. Route 90 in Louisiana =

Highway in Louisiana

U.S. Highway 90
- US 90 highlighted in red

Route information
- Maintained by Louisiana DOTD
- Length: 297.6 mi. (478.9 km)
- Existed: 1926–present

Major junctions
- West end: I-10 / US 90 at Texas state line east of Orange, TX
- I-10 / US 171 / I-210 in Lake Charles; US 165 in Iowa; Future I-49 / US 167 / LA 182 in Lafayette; I-310 / LA 3127 in Boutte; US 90 Bus. / Future I-49 west of Westwego; I-10 / US 90 Bus. / Future I-49 / US 61 in New Orleans; I-610 in New Orleans; I-510 / LA 47 in New Orleans; US 11 in New Orleans; US 190 in White Kitchen
- East end: US 90 at Mississippi state line west of Pearlington, MS

Location
- Country: United States
- State: Louisiana
- Parishes: Calcasieu, Jefferson Davis, Acadia, Lafayette, St. Martin, Iberia, St. Mary, Assumption, Terrebonne, Lafourche, St. Charles, Jefferson, Orleans, St. Tammany

Highway system
- United States Numbered Highway System; List; Special; Divided; Louisiana State Highway System; Interstate; US; State; Scenic
← LA 89	→ LA 91

U.S. Highway 90 (US 90), one of the major east–west U.S. Highways in the Southern United States, runs through southern Louisiana for 297.6 miles (478.9 km), serving Lake Charles, Lafayette, New Iberia, Morgan City, and New Orleans. Much of it west of Lafayette and east of New Orleans has been supplanted by Interstate 10 (I-10) for all but local traffic, but the section between Lafayette and New Orleans runs a good deal south of I-10.

The stretch between Lafayette and New Orleans is planned as a southern extension of I-49 and is signed as "future corridor I-49". This part of the highway is important to the offshore petroleum industry, as it connects the cities of Lafayette and New Orleans to the port cities along the coast. Most of US 90 from New Iberia to New Orleans that has not already been improved to Interstate grade, is mainly an expressway, excepting the towns traversed through, that can be easily upgraded to freeway standards. The freeway east of Morgan City, bypassing Houma to the north, was originally built as Louisiana Highway 3052 (LA 3052); US 90 was shifted to it from its former alignment (now LA 182) once it was completed.

US 90 replaced almost all of the Louisiana section of the San Diego–St. Augustine running Old Spanish Trail. It was also designated Louisiana Highway 2 (LA 2) until the 1955 renumbering. A long section of the old road, from Lafayette to northeast of Raceland, is now LA 182.

== Route description ==
=== State line to Lafayette ===
US 90 enters Louisiana at the Texas line over the Sabine River as part of I-10. Separating at exit 4 and running parallel on the north side of I-10 through Sulphur, before rejoining I-10 east of Westlake, crossing the Calcasieu River, and again splitting from I-10 at exit 31B (running on the south side of I-10) going through Lake Charles as Fruge, West 4th, then East 4th, before leaving town. In Iowa US 90 intersects with the southern terminus of US 165 continuing east through Lacassine, Welsh, Roanoke, Jennings, and Mermentau. East of Mermentau US 90 runs north of and parallel to a section of the Old Spanish Trail through Midland, Estherwood, and Crowley. In Crowley US 90 makes a north then east jog, bringing it close and parallel to I-10, passing through Rayne, Duson, Scott, and then into Lafayette.

=== Lafayette to Raceland ===
From Lafayette, US 90 traverses a south-southeast course to Patterson, where the highway takes a more easterly direction to New Orleans. The section east (south) of Broussard, beginning east of Captain Cade road but west of LA 88, to just west of Patterson, has been improved to Interstate grade and completed in June 2011. These improvements include the completion of the overpasses at Coteau Road (LA 88), Jefferson Island Road (LA 675), Center street (LA 14), Avery Island road (LA 329), South Lewis Street (Parish Road 605), Weeks Island road (LA 83), Darnall Road (Parish Road 211), Patout Road (LA 85), and Canal Street (LA 668). This section ties into the already completed section that begins at LA 318 and terminates at East Main street (LA 182) just east of Calumet. West of Berwick US 90 is listed as Interstate grade with a 70-mile (110 km) per hour speed limit from (mile marker 174) to east of Raceland and an intersection with LA 1 (mile marker 215B), before reverting to a standard divided highway and continuing on a north/northeast direction to New Orleans.

=== New Orleans ===
US 90 enters Jefferson Parish, and after passing Avondale, heads north at an intersection with US 90 Business, called the Westbank Expressway, through Bridge City, and across the Mississippi River over the Huey P. Long Bridge. Crossing the river US 90, designated as S. Clearview Parkway, intersects with and runs east as the Jefferson Highway, that was originally part of the "Interstate Trail" and the "Pine to Palm" highway, a 2,300-mile (3,700 km) north–south transcontinental U.S interstate highway running from New Orleans to Winnipeg, Manitoba, Canada The highway terminus was at the corner of St. Charles Avenue and Common Street with a monument that was erected in 1916. The original highway was changed to follow US 90 and LA 48. After 1935 Jefferson became S. Claiborne Avenue at the Orleans Parish line and makes a sweeping south-to-north semicircle weaving through New Orleans. As the highway swings north it intersects and runs under an elevated I-10, where it turns northwest along Tulane Avenue. The highway soon turns northeast along South Broad Avenue—North Broad Avenue after the intersection with Canal Street—then runs into a pair of regular individual streets (i.e., not a street that has a median—or neutral ground in the vernacular of New Orleans—separating half of the lanes from the other half) that are from the old street grid and thus parallel at about 120 yards (110 m) from each other (named New Orleans Street & Allen Street) for about 1/4 mile (0.40 km), crossing I-610 in this tiny span, and finally turning right (east) onto Gentilly Boulevard (which has a median), which eventually becomes Chef Menteur Highway (a mainly straight highway that replaced what is now called Old Gentilly Road), then crossing I-510, and then a few miles later, loses the median and meanders (i.e., in a manner similar to the way that Old Gentily meanders) until first reaching the national southern terminus of U.S. 11, which leads to the Irish Bayou community, and then passing the Venetian Isles community (a subdivision in which homes have a canal in the backyard for easy access to the surrounding lakes), and finally becoming a two-lane highway at the bridge over the Chef Menteur Pass to go past the Lake Catherine community until reaching the bridge over the Rigolets, after which US 90 finally leaves the corporate limit of New Orleans, entering St. Tammany Parish. The stretch in the Lake Catherine community is where Jayne Mansfield was killed in a car accident on her way to New Orleans from Mississippi.

In St. Tammany Parish, US 90 then enters Slidell. After exiting Slidell it heads east and crosses the Mississippi state line at a drawbridge at the Pearl River.

- The Jefferson Highway was the first north/south transcontinental highway in America, the second interstate highway, after the Lincoln Highway that it intersects in Colo, Iowa, but was the first international interstate highway in the world.

=== Interstates 49 and 910 ===
The Business US 90 portion of the Pontchartrain Expressway is also designated as Interstate 910, however it is not signed as such. This is a temporary designation that overlaps all freeway portions of Business US 90 (the Pontchartrain Expressway, Crescent City Connection, and Westbank Expressway). When Interstate 49 is completed from Lafayette to New Orleans, Business US 90/Interstate 910 will be resigned as Interstate 49.

== History ==
The modern US 90 has its roots in an early 20th-century auto trail known as the Old Spanish Trail, which was designated as State Route 2 within Louisiana when the state first numbered its highway system in 1921. US 90 was applied to the route when the numbered U.S. Highway system was implemented in 1926. With minor exceptions, Route 2 generally remained co-signed with US 90 throughout the state until such overlapping between U.S. and state routes was eliminated in the 1955 Louisiana Highway renumbering. Prior to 1955, as US 90 was gradually relocated onto newer and improved alignments, Route 2 was often moved accordingly. Former alignments remaining in the state highway system were then designated as part of State Route 1092, with shorter pieces designated as Route 2-D, 2-E, and so on as needed.

- In Calcasieu Parish, on the border with Orange, Texas, US 90 originally crossed the Sabine River eastward into East Orange, Louisiana, a town consisting primarily of gambling, showboats, and supper clubs. The bridge over the Sabine River was removed after US 90 had been rerouted northward in Orange onto Simmons Drive and Interstate 10.
- In Lake Charles, US 90 traveled from Westlake down present-day Mike Hooks Road to cross the Calcasieu River on a bridge built in 1916. The road then traveled along Shell Beach and Lakeshore Drive to continue eastward on Broad Street. This alignment changed with the completion of the Lake Charles I-10 Bridge in 1952.
- In St. Charles Parish and Lafourche Parish, US 90 traveled down present-day LA 631, crossing the swing bridge still used by local traffic in Des Allemands.
- In Lafourche Parish, the old US 90 (now LA 182) splits off from the current US 90/Future I-49 just northeast of Raceland. Further southwest it enters Raceland, intersecting with LA 308, then immediately afterwards crosses Bayou Lafourche over a lift bridge. The route then goes to the right, through the middle of Raceland coaligned with LA 1 for a few thousand feet. It then takes a turn to the southwest as Willow Street or Old Houma Road, interchanging with US 90/Future I-49. Just south of this interchange, it travels as a four-lane highway until the junction with Prospect Boulevard/LA 3087. Old Highway 90/LA 182 then heads to Bayou Blue and on to downtown Houma as a major two-lane highway. LA 653 was US 90's original route but was supplanted in the 1950s by its current route, what is now LA 182, and most of this original road has been abandoned.
- Jefferson Parish:
  - 1926–1928: The original alignment of US 90 generally followed today's LA 18 through Jefferson Parish and crossed the Mississippi River into Orleans Parish (city of New Orleans) via the Jackson Avenue Ferry at Gretna. The exact routing was as follows:
    - LA 18 (River Road) from the St. Charles Parish line eastbound to Avondale.
    - The original road through the Avondale shipyards continued straight along the river levee and no longer exists.
    - LA 541 (continuation of River Road) and Bridge City Avenue through Bridge City.
    - LA 18 (Seven Oaks Boulevard, formerly Bridge City Avenue) to Westwego.
    - LA 541 (River Road), Sala Avenue, and LA 18 (Fourth Street) through Westwego.
    - LA 18 (Fourth Street, Barataria Boulevard, and continuation of Fourth Street) to Gretna.
    - Huey P. Long Avenue to the Gretna Ferry landing.
  - 1928–1930: US 90 was re-routed over the Walnut Street Ferry in September 1928, shortening the route in Jefferson Parish to the former ferry landing at River Road and Sala Avenue in Westwego.
  - 1930–1937: US 90 was restored to its original route through Jefferson Parish in May 1930, after widening and resurfacing of the Westwego-Gretna section was completed in April.
  - 1937–1941: The Huey P. Long Bridge was opened in December 1935. US 90 was re-routed over the bridge, following Jefferson Highway into Orleans Parish, after widening of that thoroughfare to four lanes was completed in 1937. (LA 2 remained on the old alignment until the 1955 renumbering of Louisiana highways.)
  - 1941–present: The current alignment (the "Boutte Cutoff") west of the Huey P. Long Bridge was opened in April 1941, bypassing the winding river road. This alignment was widened to four lanes in 1953.
- Orleans Parish (west of Peoples Avenue):
  - 1926–1928: US 90 originally followed this route through New Orleans, starting from the Jackson Avenue Ferry landing:
    - Jackson Avenue and South Claiborne Avenue to downtown New Orleans.
    - Canal Street, North Broad Avenue, Bruxelles Street, and Gentilly Boulevard to Peoples Avenue.
    - The above route, though signed in the field, had several problems that were mostly alleviated by a re-routing in 1928:
      - The New Basin Canal bridge on South Claiborne Avenue had been closed in 1923 due to safety concerns. A temporary bridge was opened in July 1928, but it was a traffic bottleneck.
      - Bruxelles Street became a one-way street in 1926, forcing westbound traffic to follow the unpaved Paris and St. Bernard Avenues from Gentilly to Broad.
      - Jackson Avenue was also unpaved beyond St. Charles Avenue and did not connect directly to South Claiborne Avenue westbound.
      - The Jackson Avenue Ferry service was considered to be inferior to that of the Walnut Street Ferry which the Old Spanish Trail had followed for years.
  - 1928–1930: The route of US 90 was revised above Canal Street in September 1928, utilizing a better ferry and avoiding the New Basin Canal bridge and railroad crossings on South Claiborne Avenue. From the Walnut Street Ferry landing, the revised route was as follows:
    - Walnut Street, St. Charles Avenue to Lee Circle, Howard Avenue, and Camp Street to Canal Street.
    - Because of one-way streets, westbound traffic followed Canal Street, St. Charles Avenue, and Audubon Street to the Walnut Street Ferry landing.
  - 1930–1931: In spite of protests, US 90 was routed back over the Jackson Avenue Ferry in May 1930, following Jackson Avenue, St. Charles Avenue, Washington Avenue, and South Claiborne Avenue to Canal Street.
  - 1931–1937: After Jackson Avenue was paved between St. Charles Avenue and South Claiborne Avenue in October 1931, the Washington Avenue detour was eliminated. Paving of Paris and St. Bernard Avenues was completed in March 1932, but eastbound traffic still followed Bruxelles Street.
  - 1937–1939: After being re-routed over the Huey P. Long Bridge, US 90 now entered Orleans Parish on South Claiborne Avenue, following South Carrollton Avenue and Canal Street to North Broad Avenue.
  - 1939–1946: US 90 shortly began to follow South Claiborne Avenue directly to Canal Street.
  - 1946–1956: The Bruxelles Street link was finally eliminated. Eastbound traffic now followed St. Bernard and Paris Avenues from Broad to Gentilly. Westbound traffic followed St. Bernard Avenue only.
  - 1956–1975: US 90 was re-routed over the North Broad Avenue extension and railroad underpass that had been opened in April 1952. Eastbound traffic was fed onto Allen Street to Gentilly Boulevard. Westbound traffic followed New Orleans Street from Gentilly Boulevard onto North Broad Avenue.
  - 1975–present: The final change in routing was the substitution of Tulane Avenue for Canal Street around 1975.
- Orleans Parish (east of Peoples Avenue):
  - 1926–1929: Continuing from the intersection of Gentilly Boulevard and Peoples Avenue, the original route of US 90 through eastern New Orleans was as follows:
    - Old Gentilly Road to the Industrial Canal. US 90 crossed the canal over the L&N Railroad bridge (also known as the Almonaster Avenue Bridge), a combination railroad/vehicular bridge opened in 1919 now closed to vehicular traffic. The bridge was originally connected to Old Gentilly Road via two sharp right-angle turns on either side.
    - Continuation of Old Gentilly Road to Michoud.
    - US 90 remains on its original alignment (Chef Menteur Highway) from Michoud to a point two miles west of the Chef Menteur Bridge, where the original road continued to the left along Bayou Sauvage. Portions of this road still exist as Old Chef Menteur Road and Fort Macomb Road.
    - US 90 crossed the Chef Menteur Pass by ferry, then continued along the current alignment toward the Rigolets. About a third of the way to the Rigolets, a curve on the south side of the road has been bypassed.
    - At the approach to the Rigolets Bridge, US 90 continued straight ahead on a road which no longer exists to the site of the Rigolets Ferry to St. Tammany Parish.
  - 1929–1930: The Chef Menteur Bridge was opened in September 1929, replacing the ferry service.
  - 1930–1932: The Rigolets Bridge (with new approach road) was opened in June 1930, followed shortly by the first section of Chef Menteur Highway between Downman Road and Lee Station. The route was now:
    - Old Gentilly Road to the Industrial Canal, with the dangerous bridge approaches smoothed out. The eastern approach now fed traffic onto the new Chef Menteur Highway.
    - Current US 90 (Chef Menteur Highway) to Lee Station, curving back onto Old Gentilly Road just east of present-day Crowder Boulevard.
    - Old Gentilly Road to Michoud.
    - Current US 90 (Chef Menteur Highway) and old approach (described above) to Chef Menteur Pass.
    - Current US 90 (Chef Menteur Highway) across Chef Menteur and Rigolets bridges to St. Tammany Parish.
  - 1932–1934: The Peoples Avenue-Downman Road section of Chef Menteur Highway, including a new bridge over the Industrial Canal, was opened in 1932. The original Danziger Bridge existed on the north side of the current bridge.
  - 1934–1942: The permanent approach road to the Chef Menteur Bridge was finally opened, eliminating the road along Bayou Sauvage with right-angle turn onto the bridge.
  - 1942–present: The "Michoud Cutoff," the section of Chef Menteur Highway from Lee Station to Michoud, was opened in May 1942, completing the current alignment.
- In St. Tammany Parish, US 90 originally took a much longer route toward Mississippi. After crossing the Rigolets, US 90 traveled along LA 433 (Old Spanish Trail) to Slidell, then US 11 (Front Street) to Pearl River, continuing onto LA 3081 (Main Street). The bridge across the West Pearl River no longer exists. The route continued onto Old US 11, crossing the site of current US 11/I-59. Old US 11 continues through the Pearl River State Wildlife Management Area to the Mississippi state line, where a bridge once crossed the Pearl River. This out-of-the-way alignment was bypassed around 1930 when the current alignment to Pearlington was constructed. US 11 was subsequently routed onto it.

== Future ==
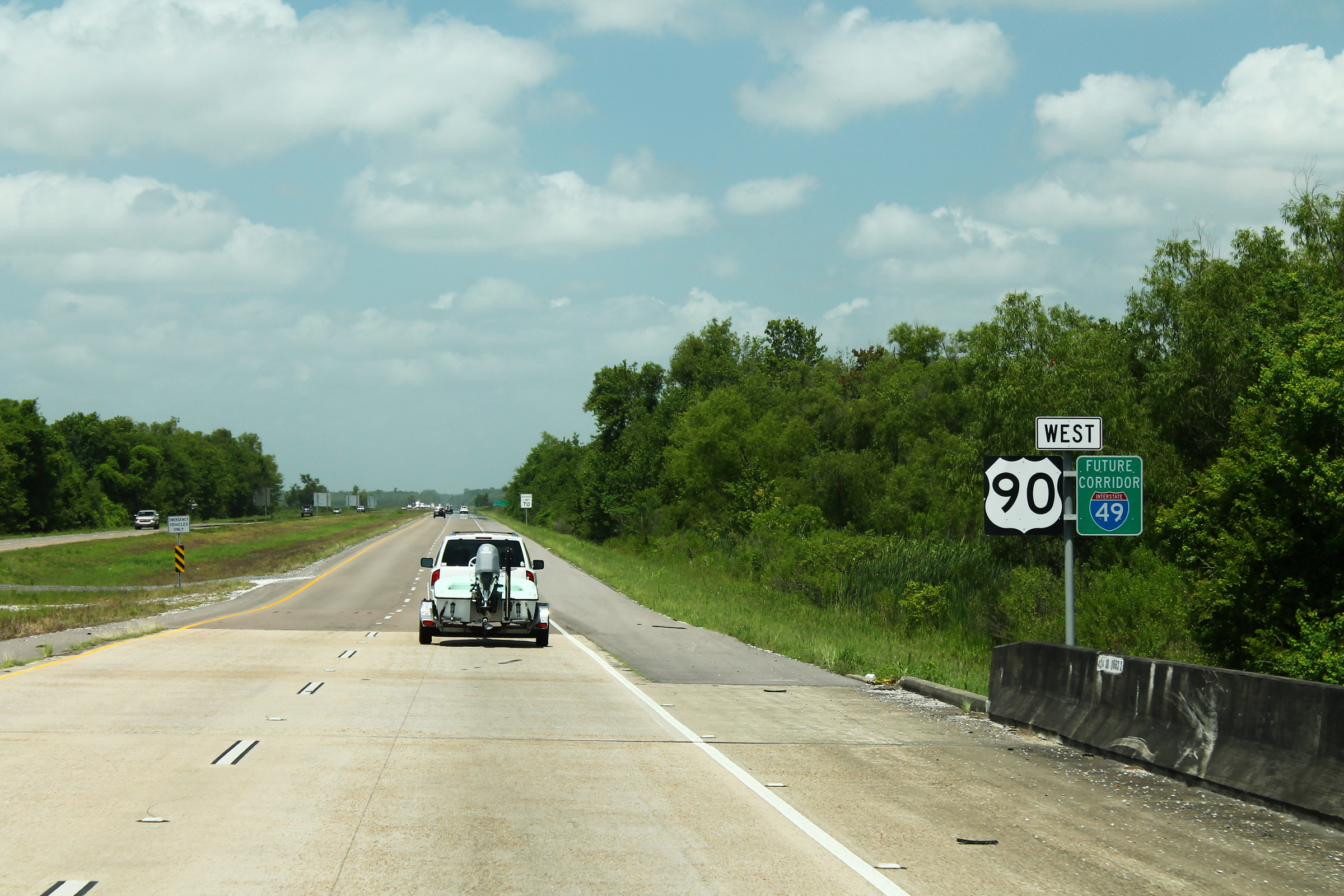
US 90 West and Future I-49 Corridor signs near Raceland in 2014.

In Louisiana, current plans call for parts of US 90 to be upgraded to Interstate Highway standards from Lafayette to just west of New Orleans and designated I-49. The stretch of US 90 to be upgraded to I-49 is listed under High Priority Corridor 37 and stretches from the West Bank Expressway (US 90 Business near Westwego) to just north of downtown Lafayette, where US 90 splits from US 167 (the two highways converge in downtown Lafayette). The stretch of US 167 from US 90 to I-10 will also be upgraded and included as part of I-49. As of March 2008, due to a $1 billion surplus in the Louisiana state budget, the legislature approved a bill which proposed capacity improvements on US 90 in the Lafayette area. US 167/US 90 is currently six-lanes from I-10 in Lafayette to LA 182 and LA 96 in Broussard.

== Major intersections ==
Parish	Location	mi	km	Exit	Destinations	Notes
Sabine River		0.000– 0.059	0.000– 0.095		I-10 west / US 90 west – Beaumont	Continuation in Texas
Sabine River		0.000– 0.059	0.000– 0.095	Bridge over Sabine River		
Calcasieu		0.144	0.232	1	Sabine River Turnaround	Eastbound entrance and westbound exit
Calcasieu	Toomey	3.448– 5.116	5.549– 8.233	4	I-10 east – Lake Charles	Eastern end of I-10 concurrency
Calcasieu	Toomey	5.237	8.428		LA 109 north – Starks LA 3112 west	Southern terminus of LA 109; eastern terminus of LA 3112
Calcasieu	Vinton	8.4	13.5		LA 3063 (West Street) to I-10	
Calcasieu	Sulphur	22.8	36.7		LA 27 (Beglis Parkway) – DeQuincy, Cameron	
Calcasieu	Sulphur	24.9	40.1		LA 108 south (North Cities Service Highway) to I-10	Northeastern terminus of LA 108
Calcasieu		27.9	44.9	26	I-10 west – Beaumont	Western end of I-10 concurrency; eastbound entrance and westbound exit
Calcasieu	Westlake	28.5– 28.9	45.9– 46.5	27	LA 378 (Sampson Street) – Westlake	Southwestern terminus of LA 378
Calcasieu	Westlake–Lake Charles line	28.9– 30.1	46.5– 48.4	Bridge over Calcasieu River		
Calcasieu	Lake Charles	30.4	48.9	29	LA 1262 – Downtown Area	Eastbound exit and westbound entrance
Calcasieu	Lake Charles	31.0	49.9	30A	LA 1262 (Lakeshore Drive)	Northern terminus of LA 1262; eastbound entrance and westbound exit
Calcasieu	Lake Charles	31.3– 31.6	50.4– 50.9	30B	Ryan Street – Downtown Area	Eastbound entrance and westbound exit
Calcasieu	Lake Charles	31.9– 32.4	51.3– 52.1	31A	US 90 Bus. east (Enterprise Boulevard)	Western terminus of US 90 Bus.
Calcasieu	Lake Charles	32.6– 32.8	52.5– 52.8	31B	I-10 east – Lafayette	Eastern end of I-10 concurrency
Calcasieu	Lake Charles	33.6	54.1		US 171 north / LA 14 south (Martin Luther King Highway) – Cameron, DeRidder	Southern terminus of US 171; western terminus of LA 14
Calcasieu	Lake Charles	34.4	55.4		US 90 Bus. west (Pamco Road)	Eastern terminus of US 90 Bus.
Calcasieu	Lake Charles	34.5	55.5		I-210 east – Lafayette	Exit 11 on I-210; eastbound entrance and exit (westbound via US 90 Bus.)
Calcasieu		36.7	59.1		LA 397 (East Ward Line Road) to I-10 – Creole, Cameron	
Calcasieu		37.6	60.5		LA 3256 (Manchester Road) – Chloe	Western terminus of LA 3256
Calcasieu	Iowa	43.5	70.0		LA 383 north (South Thompson Avenue)	Southern terminus of LA 383
Calcasieu	Iowa	44.4	71.5		US 165 north to I-10 – Kinder, Alexandria	Southern terminus of US 165
Jefferson Davis	Lacassine	48.6	78.2		LA 101 – Hayes	
Jefferson Davis		51.7	83.2		LA 1131	Northern terminus of LA 1131
Jefferson Davis	Welsh	55.0	88.5		LA 99 north (South Adams Street) – Pine Island	Western end of LA 99 concurrency
Jefferson Davis	Welsh	55.3	89.0		LA 99 south (South Simmons Street) – Thornwell, Lake Arthur	Eastern end of LA 99 concurrency
Jefferson Davis		57.8	93.0		LA 382 – Thornwell	Northern terminus of LA 382
Jefferson Davis	Roanoke	59.5	95.8		LA 395 north – Elton	Southern terminus of LA 395
Jefferson Davis	Jennings	64.5	103.8		LA 26 north (Elton Road) to I-10 – Elton LA 26 south (North Lake Arthur Avenue) – Lake Arthur	
Jefferson Davis	Jennings	65.0	104.6		LA 97 / LA 102 north (North Cutting Avenue) to I-10 – Evangeline, Lafayette	Western end of LA 102 concurrency; southern terminus of LA 97
Jefferson Davis	Jennings	65.9	106.1		LA 102 south (South Cutting Avenue) LA 3055 west (East Railroad Avenue) – Lake Arthur	Eastern end of LA 102 concurrency; eastern terminus of LA 3055
Jefferson Davis		68.6	110.4		LA 1126	Eastern terminus of LA 1126
Jefferson Davis–Acadia parish line	Mermentau	70.4	113.3	Bridge over Mermentau River		
Acadia		71.7	115.4		LA 92 south (Mermentau Cove Road)	Northwestern terminus of LA 92
Acadia	Midland	75.8	122.0		LA 91 south (South Crocker Street) – Morse, Gueydan	Western end of LA 91 concurrency
Acadia	Estherwood	77.9	125.4		LA 91 north (North Canal Street) – Iota	Eastern end of LA 91 concurrency
Acadia	Estherwood	78.1	125.7		LA 1124 south (South Leblanc Road) – Morse, Kaplan	
Acadia	Crowley	84.1	135.3		LA 13 north (North Parkerson Avenue) – Eunice	Western end of LA 13 concurrency
Acadia	Crowley	84.6	136.2		LA 13 south (North Eastern Avenue) – Kaplan LA 13 Truck begins	Eastern end of LA 13 concurrency; western end of LA 13 Truck concurrency; southern terminus of LA 13 Truck
Acadia	Crowley	85.8	138.1		LA 13 Truck / LA 1111 Spur north (Tower Road) to I-10 – Eunice	Eastern end of LA 13 Truck concurrency; southwestern terminus of LA 1111 Spur
Acadia	Crowley	86.0	138.4		LA 1111 Spur (Odd Fellows Road) to I-10 – Eunice	Northeastern terminus of LA 1111 Spur
Acadia	Rayne	91.4	147.1		LA 35 south (Abbeville Highway) – Kaplan, Abbeville	Western end of LA 35 concurrency
Acadia	Rayne	92.0	148.1		LA 35 north (North Adams Avenue) to I-10 – Opelousas	Eastern end of LA 35 concurrency
Acadia–Lafayette parish line	Duson	95.5	153.7		LA 719 (South Riceland Road)	Northern terminus of LA 719
Lafayette	Duson	96.5	155.3		LA 95 north (Austria Road) to I-10 – Church Point	Southern terminus of LA 95
Lafayette	Duson	97.5	156.9		LA 343 (South Richfield Road) – Ridge, Maurice	
Lafayette	Sadou	99.5	160.1		LA 724 (South Fieldspan Road) – Judice	
Lafayette	Scott	101.7	163.7		LA 93 north (Apollo Road) – Cankton, Sunset	Southern terminus of LA 93
Lafayette	Lafayette	104.4	168.0		LA 3184 (Ambassador Caffery Parkway) to I-10	
Lafayette	Lafayette	105.0	169.0		LA 3025 (North Bertrand Drive)	Northern terminus of LA 3025
Lafayette	Lafayette	106.2	170.9		US 90 Bus. east / LA 182 (North University Avenue) to I-10 / I-49 – Opelousas	Western terminus of US 90 Bus.
Lafayette	Lafayette	107.4	172.8		US 167 north (NW/NE Evangeline Thruway) to I-10 / I-49 – Opelousas	Western end of US 167 concurrency; future western end of I-49 concurrency
Lafayette	Lafayette	107.7	173.3		LA 176 north (Jefferson Boulevard)	Southern terminus of LA 176
Lafayette	Lafayette	108.0	173.8		US 167 south (Johnston Street) – Abbeville LA 94 east (Louisiana Avenue) – Breaux Bridge	Eastern end of US 167 concurrency; western terminus of LA 94
Lafayette	Lafayette	108.6	174.8		US 90 Bus. west (East Pinhook Road)	Eastern terminus of US 90 Bus.
Lafayette	Lafayette	109.4	176.1		LA 729 (General Mouton Avenue)	Southeastern terminus of LA 729
Lafayette	Lafayette	110.1	177.2		LA 728-2	Southern terminus of LA 728-2
Lafayette	Lafayette–Broussard line	112.2	180.6		LA 89-1 south / LA 182 west (Southpark Road) – Youngsville	Northern terminus of LA 89-1; western end of LA 182 concurrency
Lafayette	Broussard	113.1	182.0	Current Western end of freeway		
Lafayette	Broussard	115.621	186.074	115A	St. Nazaire Road / Albertson Parkway	Eastbound exit, westbound entrance
Lafayette	Broussard	115.951– 116.407	186.605– 187.339	115B	LA 182 east (East Main Street) to LA 96 – Cade, St. Martinville	Eastern end of LA 182 concurrency; signed as Exit 115A westbound
Lafayette	Broussard	116.9	188.1	117	LA 3073 (Ambassador Caffery Parkway, Corne Road)	Opened in 2026
Lafayette	Broussard	118.0	189.9		LA 92-1 west (Young Street) – Youngsville	Western end of LA 92-1 concurrency
St. Martin	Broussard	118.5	190.7		LA 92-1 east (Smede Highway) – Cade, St. Martinville	Eastern end of LA 92-1 concurrency
Iberia		120.6	194.1	Former Western end of freeway		
Iberia		121.4– 121.9	195.4– 196.2	122	LA 88	To Acadiana Regional Airport
Iberia		125.9– 126.4	202.6– 203.4	126	LA 675 (Jefferson Island Road)	Western terminus of LA 675
Iberia	New Iberia	127.8– 128.3	205.7– 206.5	128A	LA 14 (Center Street) – Avery Island, Abbeville	To Palmetto Island State Park and Lake Fausse Pointe State Park
Iberia	New Iberia	129.0	207.6	128B	LA 329 (Avery Island Road) – New Iberia, Avery Island	Eastbound entrance and westbound exit
Iberia		129.6– 130.2	208.6– 209.5	129	PR 605 (South Lewis Street) – Port of Iberia	
Iberia		130.6– 131.2	210.2– 211.1	130	LA 83 (Weeks Island Road)	
Iberia		133.9– 134.4	215.5– 216.3	134	PR 211 (Darnall Road)	To Cypremort Point State Park and Lake Fausse Pointe State Park
Iberia		136.9– 137.5	220.3– 221.3	137	LA 85 – Jeanerette, Patoutville	
Iberia		140.3– 140.8	225.8– 226.6	141	LA 668 (Canal Street) – Jeanerette	
St. Mary		144.0	231.7	144	LA 318 – Sorrel, Weeks Island	
St. Mary	Baldwin	148.2– 148.5	238.5– 239.0	148	LA 83 – Baldwin, Louisa	
St. Mary	Franklin	151.7– 152.3	244.1– 245.1	152	LA 3211 north – Franklin	Southern terminus of LA 3211
St. Mary		157.5– 157.8	253.5– 254.0	158	LA 3215 north – Garden City, Franklin	Southern terminus of LA 3215
St. Mary	Bayou Sale	159.0– 159.6	255.9– 256.9	159	LA 317 – Centerville, Burns Point	
St. Mary	Ricohoc	163.4	263.0	Eastern end of freeway		
St. Mary	Ricohoc	163.4	263.0	163	LA 182 west (East Main Street)	Western end of LA 182 concurrency; future interchange
St. Mary		164.1– 164.3	264.1– 264.4	Bridge over Wax Lake Outlet		
St. Mary	Calumet	164.8	265.2	164	LA 182 east	Eastern end of LA 182 concurrency
St. Mary	Berwick	173.676	279.504	Western end of freeway		
St. Mary	Berwick	173.756– 174.433	279.633– 280.723	173	LA 182 – Berwick	Signed as exit 174 westbound
St. Mary	Berwick–Morgan City line	174.609– 174.957	281.006– 281.566	Bridge over Lower Atchafalaya River / Berwick Bay		
St. Mary	Morgan City	175.136	281.854	175A	Federal Avenue	Eastbound exit and westbound entrance
St. Mary	Morgan City	175.446– 176.028	282.353– 283.290	175B	US 90 Bus. / LA 182 east LA 70 (9th Street) LA 182 west (Brashear Avenue) – Morgan City	Western terminus of US 90 Bus. and LA 70; signed as exit 175 westbound
St. Mary	Morgan City	176.1– 176.6	283.4– 284.2	176	Dr. Martin Luther King, Jr. Boulevard	
St. Mary	Amelia	181.1– 181.7	291.5– 292.4	181	PR 4 (Lake Palourde Bypass Road) – Amelia	
St. Mary–Assumption parish line		181.4– 182.7	291.9– 294.0	Bridge over Bayou Boeuf		
Assumption		182.4– 182.9	293.5– 294.3	182	LA 662 – Boeuf US 90 Bus. west	Eastern terminus of US 90 Bus.
Terrebonne		185.1– 185.8	297.9– 299.0	185	LA 662 to LA 182	
Terrebonne	Gibson	189.4– 190.4	304.8– 306.4	189	LA 20 – Gibson	
Terrebonne	Chacahoula	194.6– 195.0	313.2– 313.8	194	LA 20 – Chacahoula, Thibodaux	
Terrebonne		200.2– 200.4	322.2– 322.5	200	LA 311	
Terrebonne		201.8– 202.5	324.8– 325.9	202	LA 24 – Thibodaux, Houma	
Terrebonne–Lafourche parish line		203.8– 204.6	328.0– 329.3	204	LA 316 (Bayou Blue Road) – Gray, Bayou Blue	
Lafourche		210.9– 211.2	339.4– 339.9	210	LA 182 – Raceland, Houma	
Lafourche	Raceland	215.509– 215.865	346.828– 347.401	215A	LA 1 – Raceland, Lockport	Signed as exit 215 eastbound
Lafourche	Raceland	216.285	348.077	215B	LA 308 – Raceland	Eastbound entrance and westbound exit
Lafourche	Raceland	218.373	351.437	Eastern end of freeway		
Lafourche		219.2– 219.4	352.8– 353.1		LA 182 – Raceland	Southeastern terminus of LA 182
Lafourche		225.3	362.6		LA 631	Western terminus of LA 631
Lafourche–St. Charles parish line	Des Allemands	225.4– 225.9	362.7– 363.6	Bridge over Bayou Des Allemands		
St. Charles	Des Allemands	226.4	364.4		LA 632 (Levee Road, WPA Road)	
St. Charles	Des Allemands	226.5– 226.7	364.5– 364.8		LA 631 Spur (Old US 90) – Des Allemands Business District	Eastern terminus of LA 631 Spur (signed as LA 631)
St. Charles		228.8	368.2		LA 635	Eastern terminus of LA 635
St. Charles	Paradis	230.3	370.6		LA 306 – Bayou Gauche	
St. Charles	Boutte	232.8– 233.7	374.7– 376.1		I-310 north / LA 3127 – Donaldsonville, New Orleans	Southern terminus of I-310 and LA 3127
St. Charles	Boutte	234.0	376.6		LA 52 (Paul Maillard Road) – Luling; LA 633 (Magnolia Ridge Road)	Southern terminus of LA 52; northern terminus of LA 633
St. Charles	Luling	236.7	380.9		LA 3060 (Barton Avenue)	Southern terminus of LA 3060
Jefferson		246.6– 246.9	396.9– 397.3		US 90 Bus. east (West Bank Expressway) – Gretna	Interchange; western terminus of US 90 Bus.; future eastern end of I-49 concurrency
Jefferson		247.5	398.3		LA 18 west (River Road) – Avondale	Western end of LA 18 concurrency
Jefferson	Bridge City	248.3	399.6		LA 18 east (Seven Oaks Boulevard) – Bridge City, Westwego	Interchange; eastern end of LA 18 concurrency
Jefferson		248.4– 250.3	399.8– 402.8	Huey P. Long Bridge over Mississippi River		
Jefferson	Elmwood	250.3	402.8		LA 48 west (Jefferson Highway) LA 3152 north (South Clearview Parkway)	Interchange; eastern terminus of LA 48; southern terminus of LA 3152
Jefferson	Jefferson	251.6	404.9		LA 611-3 (Shrewsbury Road)	Northern terminus of LA 611-3
Jefferson	Jefferson	251.9	405.4		LA 3046 north (Causeway Boulevard)	Partial interchange; southern terminus of LA 3046
Jefferson	Jefferson	252.4	406.2		To LA 3139 south (Earhart Expressway) via Deckbar Avenue	
Orleans	New Orleans	257.2– 257.9	413.9– 415.0		I-10 – Slidell, Baton Rouge	Exit 234A, C on I-10; indirect access from westbound I-10 to eastbound US 90
Orleans	New Orleans	257.2– 257.9	413.9– 415.0		US 90 Bus. west – Mississippi River Bridge	Exit 13A–B on US 90 Bus.; indirect access from eastbound US 90
Orleans	New Orleans	257.2– 257.9	413.9– 415.0		Poydras Street – Superdome	Eastbound exit and westbound entrance
Orleans	New Orleans	258.8	416.5		US 61 north (Tulane Avenue)	Southern terminus of US 61
Orleans	New Orleans	261.3	420.5		I-610 east – Slidell	Exit 2B on I-610; eastbound entrance and westbound exit
Orleans	New Orleans	262.0	421.6		LA 3021 south (Elysian Fields Avenue)	Northern terminus of LA 3021
Orleans	New Orleans	263.7– 264.1	424.4– 425.0		France Road	Interchange
Orleans	New Orleans	263.8– 264.5	424.5– 425.7	Danziger Bridge over Industrial Canal		
Orleans	New Orleans	264.5	425.7		To I-10 west – Baton Rouge via Downman Road	Eastbound exit and westbound entrance
Orleans	New Orleans	264.9– 265.1	426.3– 426.6		I-10 – Baton Rouge, Slidell	Exit 240B on I-10
Orleans	New Orleans	269.3– 269.8	433.4– 434.2		I-510 / LA 47 (Paris Road) – Slidell, Chalmette	Exit 2 on I-510
Orleans	New Orleans	275.5	443.4		US 11 north to I-10 – Irish Bayou	Southern terminus of US 11
Orleans	New Orleans	279.2– 279.5	449.3– 449.8	Bridge over Chef Menteur Pass		
Orleans–St. Tammany parish line		288.0– 289.0	463.5– 465.1	Bridge over the Rigolets		
St. Tammany		289.3	465.6		LA 433 north (Old Spanish Trail) to I-10	Southern terminus of LA 433
St. Tammany		293.7	472.7		US 190 west to I-10 – Slidell	Eastern terminus of US 190
Pearl River		294.2– 297.6	473.5– 478.9	Five bridges over Pearl River system		
Pearl River		294.2– 297.6	473.5– 478.9		US 90 east – Bay St. Louis	Continuation into Mississippi
1.000 mi = 1.609 km; 1.000 km = 0.621 mi: Concurrency terminus; Incomplete access

== Related routes ==
- US 90 Bus. (90-X) runs mainly along the old alignment through downtown Lake Charles, while US 90 uses I-10 and the newer Fruge Street.
- US 90 Bus. (90-Y) is the old route through downtown Lafayette, mostly along LA 182.
- US 90 Bus. (90-W) is mostly the old route (LA 182) through and east of Morgan City.
- US 90 Bus. (90-Z) is more of a bypass than a business route in the New Orleans area, running along the Westbank Expressway.
- US 190 splits from US 90 east of Slidell, just west of the Mississippi state line. It heads west into Texas, staying north of US 90.

U.S. Route 90
Previous state: Texas	Louisiana	Next state: Mississippi
