= Lake St. Catherine (Louisiana) =

Brackish-water lake within the city limits of New Orleans, Louisiana

- Location within Louisiana Location within the United States
- Location: New Orleans, Louisiana
- Coordinates: 30°07′43″N 89°44′19″W
- Type: brackish water
- Primary inflows: Fort Pike Canal, Sawmill Pass, Marques Canal, Unknown Pass, Miller's Ditch, Catherine Pass and Counterfit Pass
- Basin countries: United States
- Islands: New Orleans East Land Bridge

Lake St. Catherine (French: Lac Sainte-Catherine) is a brackish-water lake that is located in eastern Orleans Parish, within the city limits of New Orleans, between Lake Pontchartrain and Lake Borgne in Louisiana. Between Lake St. Catherine and Lake Borgne was the original Town of Lake Catherine. Established between Unknown Pass and Miller's Ditch, it was settled for railroad workers, trappers, hunters and fishermen.

== New Orleans Hurricane of 1915 ==
The 1915 Hurricane destroyed the town and thirty-five people lost their lives by remaining in the town. It was rebuilt with a number of hunting and fishing clubs being established along with the railroad workers and the Rigolets Train Station. During the Great Depression, clubs like the Winchester Club, which was for gentlemen only, The Rosemary and St. James Place were boarding houses for families and sportsmen to stay and hunt and fish the area. There were a number of families who owned camps in the area prior to Hurricane Katrina in 2005. Some of their family members worked for the railroad and helped maintain the line. The town was built next to the railroad track; the last known resident of the town was Mr. Acy. The entire area was heavily damaged during Katrina.

== New Orleans East Land Bridge ==
To the north, between Lake St. Catherine and Lake Pontchartrain is a nine-mile (14 km) long populated island known as the New Orleans East Land Bridge which had been well-populated since the 1920s, with several marinas, taverns, and restaurants, boat yards and docking facilities. Pre-Katrina the area total population was 754, not counting the weekend camp owners. On a Labor Day weekend the total population of the area would reach two to three thousand with friends and family all joining together for the last big weekend before winter.

The New Orleans East Land Bridge is made up of five distinct residential areas: the Rigolets, Chef Pass, Greens Ditch, Lake St. Catherine, and Fort Pike Subdivision; all of which border Highway 90 in New Orleans East.

== Geography ==
Lake St. Catherine is a shallow lake. Inlets that feed into it include Fort Pike Canal; Sawmill Pass; Marques Canal; Unknown Pass; Miller's Pass; St. Catherine Pass; and Counterfeit Pass. The lake has excellent fresh water and salt water fishing and is also abundant in crabs, clams, and shrimp. Ponds off the main lake are ideal during hunting season for ducks and geese.

== Hurricane Katrina ==
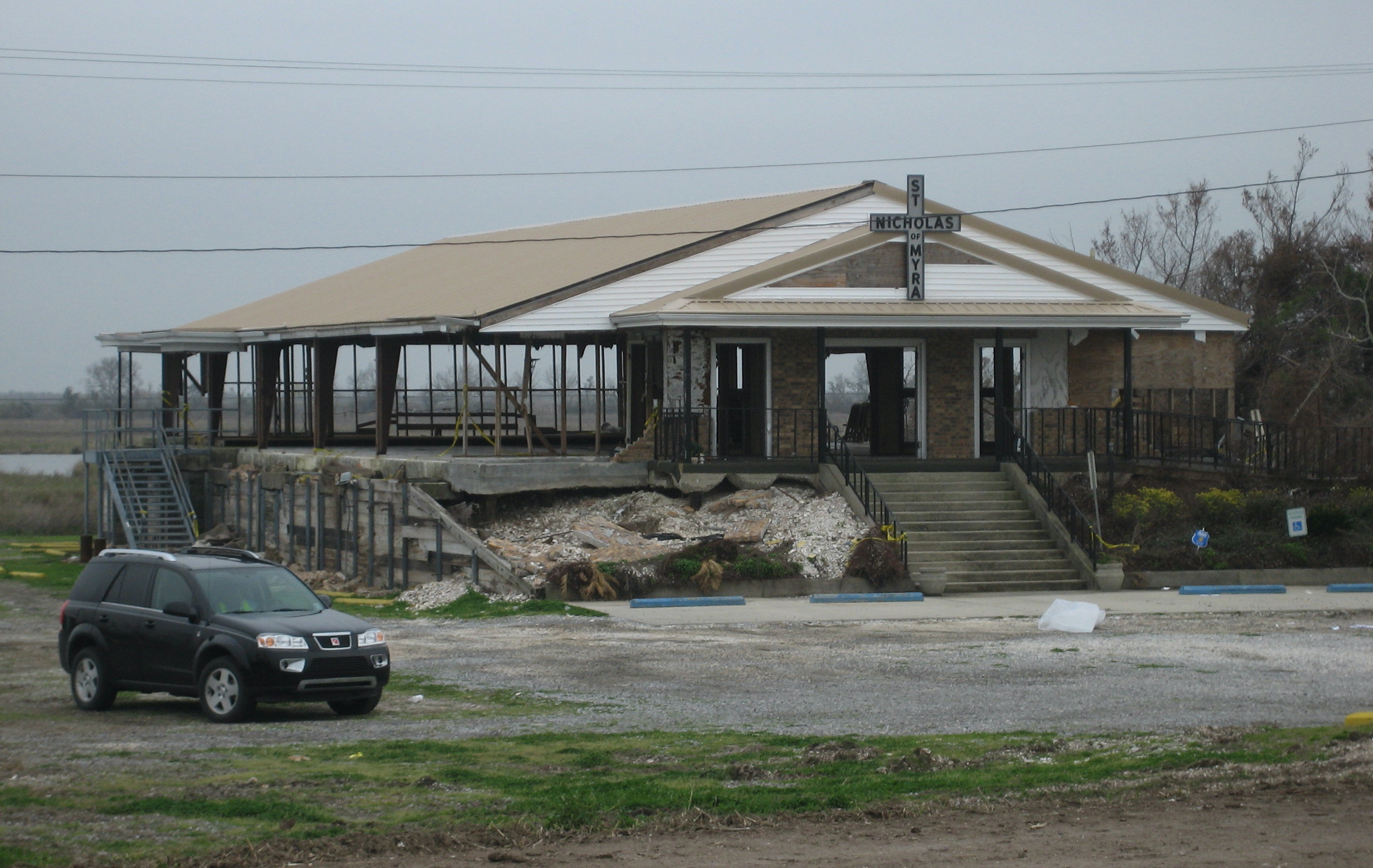
St. Nicholas of Myra Church in February 2006

Two lives were lost during Hurricane Katrina in 2005; the death toll would likely have been more severe if most people had not evacuated. Father Arthur Ginart, better known as "Father Red" to his parishioners, lost his life by choosing to remain in his church, St. Nicholas of Myra, located near Chef Menteur Pass, during the storm. It is assumed that he drowned inside the church and was washed out to sea by the retreating storm surge, which gutted the building. The church was closed, but then reopened in 2014. The second to lose his life was Wayne Aaslestad, who chose to stay with his home and was later found inside his car in Lake Pontchartrain. It is assumed he tried to evacuate too late.

== See also ==
- Fort Pike Bridge
