= U.S. Route 90 Business (Lafayette, Louisiana) =

Highway in Louisiana

U.S. Highway 90 Business

Route information
- Maintained by Louisiana DOTD
- Length: 2.6 mi (4.2 km)
- Existed: 1965–present

Major junctions
- West end: US 90 / LA 182 in Lafayette
- US 167 in Lafayette
- East end: Future I-49 / US 90 in Lafayette

Location
- Country: United States
- State: Louisiana
- Parishes: Lafayette

Highway system
- United States Numbered Highway System; List; Special; Divided; Louisiana State Highway System; Interstate; US; State; Scenic
← US 90	→ LA 91

U.S. Highway 90 Business (BUS US 90, officially 90-Y) is a state highway in Louisiana that serves Lafayette Parish. It spans 2.6 miles (4.2 km) in a northwest to southeast direction and it is signed as Business 90, with no directional shields. It is known as University Avenue and Pinhook Road. Most of the route follows the previous alignment of US 90 through downtown Lafayette.

== Route description ==
From the northwest, Business US 90 begins south towards downtown Lafayette, paired with LA 182, eventually bypassing downtown. The older alignment of US 90, it meets U.S. 167 (Johnston St.), and passes next to the University of Louisiana at Lafayette. After passing the university, US 90 Business turns to the north, while LA 182 turns to the south. US 90 Business then ends at an intersection with US 90/Future I-49.

Business US 90 is an undivided, four-lane highway for its entire length.

== History ==
The current US 90 Business is the second such route in Lafayette. The first existed in the 1940s and followed the original route of US 90 through the downtown area. At this time, US 90 had been shifted onto University Avenue, the current business route. By 1951, the original route of US 90 was restored, and the University Avenue route was designated as US 90 Bypass. In 1956, the bypass designation was dropped, and US 90 followed the University Avenue route once again. The current business route came into existence almost a decade later when US 90 was re-routed onto the Evangeline Thruway.

== Major junctions ==
The entire highway is in Lafayette, Lafayette Parish.

mi	km	Destinations	Notes
0.0	0.0	US 90 (Cameron Street) / LA 182 (North University Street)	Begin LA 182 concurrency
1.3	2.1	US 167 (Johnston Street) – Opelousas, Abbeville	
2.1	3.4	LA 182 south (Pinhook Road) / East University Avenue	End LA 182 concurrency
2.6	4.2	US 90 (Evangeline Thruway) to East Pinhook Road / I-10 / I-49	Future I-49 Corridor
1.000 mi = 1.609 km; 1.000 km = 0.621 mi: Concurrency terminus
