= List of U.S. Highways in Louisiana =

U.S. Highways of the Louisiana Highway System
- Highway markers from different years: 1928 (left), 1948 (center), 1970–present (right)

System information
- Maintained by La DOTD
- Length: 2,598.636 mi (4,182.099 km)
- Formed: November 11, 1926 (designated); February 1928 (signed)

Highway names
- US Highways: U.S. Highway X (US X)
- Special routes: U.S. Highway X Business (US X Bus.); U.S. Highway X Bypass (US X Byp.); U.S. Highway X Truck (US X Truck)

System links
- Louisiana State Highway System; Interstate; US; State; Scenic

The U.S. Highway System in Louisiana consists of 2,490.851 miles (4,008.636 km) of mainline highway routes and 107.785 miles (173.463 km) of special routes (both figures including concurrencies) that are constructed and maintained by the Louisiana Department of Transportation and Development (La DOTD).

== Mainline routes ==
Number	Length (mi)	Length (km)	Southern or western terminus	Northern or eastern terminus	Formed	Removed	Notes
US 11	31.153	50.136	US 90 in New Orleans	Mississippi state line north of Pearl River	1939	current	
US 51	68.925	110.924	US 61 in LaPlace	Mississippi state line north of Kentwood	1926	current	
US 61	121.644	195.767	US 90 in New Orleans	Mississippi state line north of St. Francisville	1926	current	
US 63	35.351	56.892	I-20/US 167/LA 146 in Ruston	Arkansas state line at Junction City	1999	current	Entire route co-signed with US 167; only U.S. highway in Louisiana with same number as a current state route (LA 63)
US 65	100.77	162.17	US 425/LA 15 in Clayton	Arkansas state line north of Lake Providence	1926	current	
US 71	231.099	371.918	US 190 west of Krotz Springs	Arkansas state line at Ida	1926	current	
US 79	88.246	142.018	Texas state line southwest of Greenwood	Arkansas state line north of Haynesville	1935	current	
US 80	199.850	321.627	Texas state line west of Greenwood	Mississippi state line at Vicksburg, MS	1926	current	
US 84	182.851	294.270	Texas state line at Logansport	Mississippi state line at Natchez, MS	1935	current	
US 90	297.6	478.9	Texas state line at Orange, TX	Mississippi state line at Pearlington, MS	1926	current	Lafayette–New Orleans segment projected to become part of I-49
US 165	228.319	367.444	US 90 east of Lake Charles	Arkansas state line north of Bonita	1926	current	
US 167	241.046	387.926	LA 14 Bus. in Abbeville	Arkansas state line at Junction City	1926	current	
US 171	177.441	285.564	US 90/LA 14 in Lake Charles	US 79/US 80/LA 3094 in Shreveport	1926	current	Only U.S. Highway completely within Louisiana; intersects US 71 via LA 3094 in Shreveport
US 190	280.8	451.9	Texas state line west of Merryville	US 90 in White Kitchen, near Slidell	1926	current	
US 371	84.140	135.410	I-49/LA 177 southwest of Coushatta	Arkansas state line at Springhill	1994	current	
US 425	120.969	194.681	Mississippi state line at Natchez, MS	Arkansas state line north of Bastrop	1989	current	

== Current special routes ==
Number	Length (mi)	Length (km)	Southern or western terminus	Northern or eastern terminus	Formed	Removed	Notes
US 51 Bus.	8.837	14.222	South of Ponchatoula	Hammond	1960	current	La DOTD designation: US 51-X
US 61 Bus.	11.098	17.860	Baton Rouge	Baton Rouge	1960	current	La DOTD designation: US 61-X; entire route duplicated by US 190 Bus.
US 71 Byp.	6.530	10.509	Alexandria	Alexandria	1994	current	Entire route follows I-49
US 79 Byp.	5.223	8.406	South of Homer	Homer	2011	current	La DOTD designation: US 79-B
US 79 Truck	4.417	7.108	Minden	Minden	—	—	Route follows combination of local roads, US 80, and LA 531
US 80 Truck	0.284	0.457	Arcadia	Arcadia	—	—	Route follows LA 798-1 and LA 151
US 80 Truck	0.158	0.254	Gibsland	Gibsland	—	—	Entire route follows LA 799
US 80 Truck	0.470	0.756	Minden	Minden	—	—	Entire route follows US 79 Truck
US 84 Bus.	0.733	1.180	Mansfield	Mansfield	2010	current	La DOTD designation: US 84-B
US 90 Bus.	2.633	4.237	Lafayette	Lafayette	1965	current	La DOTD designation: US 90-Y
US 90 Bus.	3.207	5.161	Lake Charles	Lake Charles	1963	current	La DOTD designation: US 90-X
US 90 Bus.	8.158	13.129	Morgan City	East of Amelia	1999	current	La DOTD designation: US 90-W
US 90 Bus.	14.580	23.464	West of Westwego	New Orleans	1960	current	La DOTD designation: US 90-Z
US 165 Bus.	6.073	9.774	Alexandria	Pineville	1963	current	La DOTD designation: US 165-X
US 165 Bus.	9.688	15.591	South of Richwood	Monroe	1970	current	La DOTD designation: US 165-Y
US 167 Bus.	4.306	6.930	Alexandria	Alexandria	1994	current	La DOTD designation: US 167-X
US 171 Bus.	3.113	5.010	East of Zwolle	North of Zwolle	2008	current	La DOTD designation: US 171-X
US 190 Bus.	10.982	17.674	Baton Rouge	Baton Rouge	1960	current	La DOTD designation: US 61-X; entire route duplicates US 61 Bus.
US 190 Bus.	3.306	5.320	Covington	Covington	1969	current	La DOTD designation: US 190-X
US 190 Bus.	3.937	6.336	Slidell	East of Slidell	1971	current	La DOTD designation: US 190-Y; official mileage does not reflect entire signed route
US 190 Spur	0.052	0.084	Kinder	Kinder	—	—	La DOTD designation: US 190-S; un-signed route

== Former special routes ==
Number	Length (mi)	Length (km)	Southern or western terminus	Northern or eastern terminus	Formed	Removed	Notes
US 61 Bus.	2.46	3.96	St. Francisville	St. Francisville	1960	2012	Route followed LA 3057 and LA 10 (now LA 1263)
US 61 Byp.	6.6	10.6	Baton Rouge	Baton Rouge	1947	1963	Entire route duplicated by US 65 Byp. until 1951 and US 190 Byp. after 1954; replaced by mainline US 61
US 65 Byp.	10.4	16.7	Nesser	Baton Rouge	1947	1951	Entire route duplicated US 61 Byp.; deleted when US 65 southern terminus moved to Natchez, MS
US 71 Bus.	4.5	7.2	Alexandria	Alexandria	1947	1951	Replaced by mainline US 71
US 71 Bus.	4.6	7.4	Alexandria	Alexandria	1963	1981	Replaced by re-routed US 167 and existing state highways
US 71 Byp.	4.8	7.7	Alexandria	Alexandria	1951	1963	Entire route duplicated by US 167 Byp.; replaced by mainline US 71
US 80 Alt.	3.7	6.0	East of Bossier City	Shreveport	1937	1939	Alternate Red River crossing
US 90 Alt.	3	4.8	New Orleans	New Orleans	1935	1936	
US 90 Bus.	2.7	4.3	Lafayette	Lafayette	1947	1951	Replaced by mainline US 90
US 90 Byp.	2.1	3.4	Lafayette	Lafayette	1951	1956	Replaced by mainline US 90
US 165 Byp.	8.8	14.2	Alexandria	North of Pineville	1951	1963	Replaced by mainline US 165
US 165 Byp.	7.9	12.7	Rilla	Monroe	1965	1970	Replaced by mainline US 165
US 167 Byp.	1.3	2.1	Lafayette	Lafayette	1955	1956	Entire route followed US 90 Byp.; replaced by mainline US 167
US 167 Byp.	4.8	7.7	Alexandria	Alexandria	1951	1963	Entire route duplicated US 71 Byp.; replaced by mainline US 167
US 190 Byp.	6.6	10.6	Baton Rouge	Baton Rouge	1947	1963	Entire route followed US 61 Byp. (and US 65 Byp. until 1951); replaced by mainline US 190
US 190 Spur	0.74	1.19	Hammond	Hammond	—	1991	Replaced by LA 3260
