= Fort Pike Bridge =

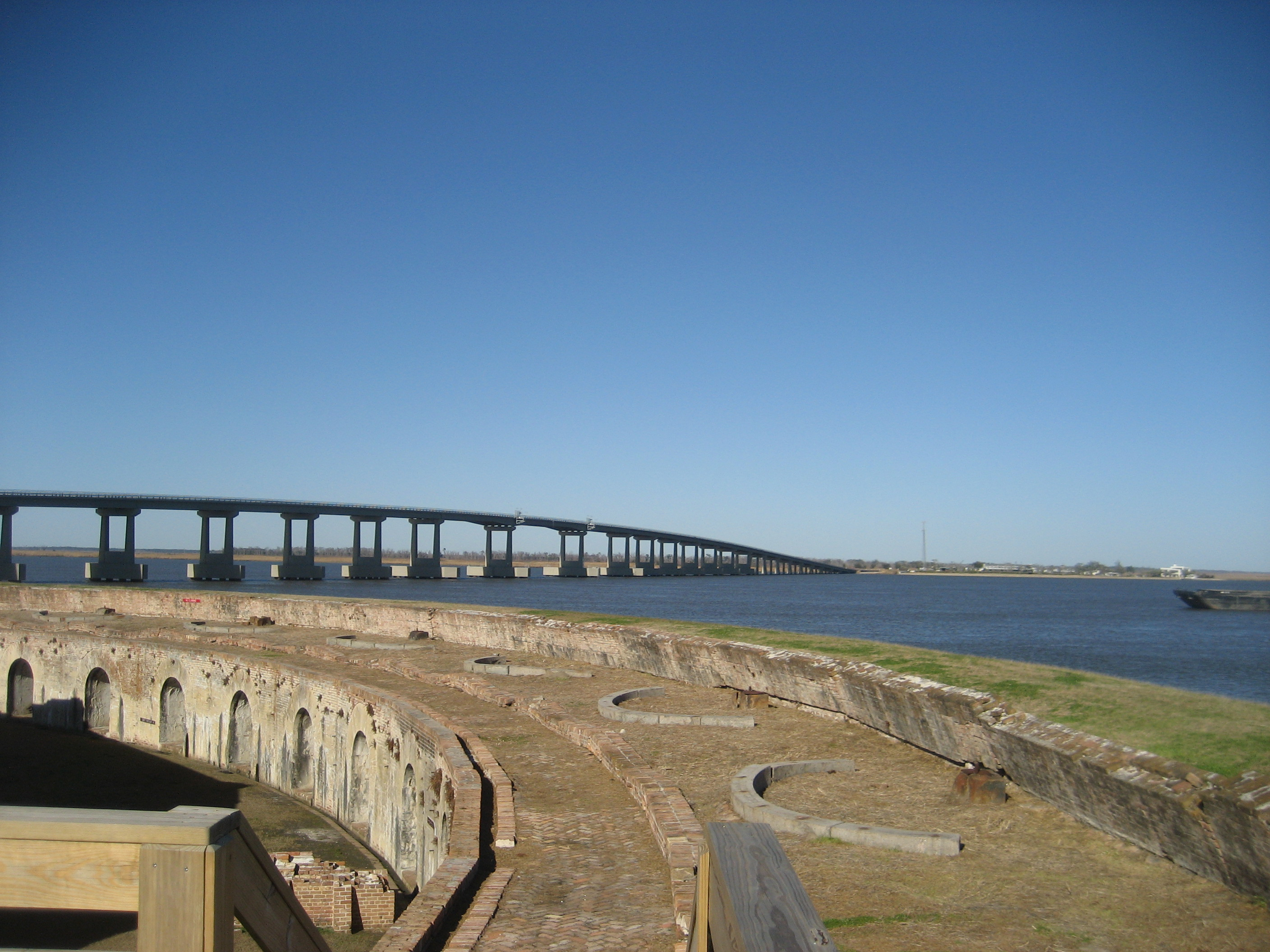
- Bridge seen from Fort Pike, 2010
- Coordinates: 30°10′21.8″N 89°43′56.9″W
- Carries: 2 lanes of US 90
- Crosses: Rigolets
- Locale: New Orleans and Slidell (Louisiana)
- Other name(s): Rigolets Bridge

Characteristics
- Design: Through truss swing bridge (old), box girder bridge (new)
- Total length: 3,877.9 feet (1,182 m)
- Width: 20 feet (6 m) (old), 40 feet (12 m)
- Longest span: 399.8 feet (122 m)
- Clearance below: 14.9 feet (5 m)(old), 72 feet (22 m) (new)

History
- Opened: June 9, 1930 (old); January 15, 2008 (new)

The Fort Pike Bridge (also known as the Rigolets Bridge), named after nearby Fort Pike, carries U.S. Route 90 across the Rigolets on the eastern side of Lake Pontchartrain between New Orleans and Slidell in Louisiana. It is owned and operated by Louisiana Department of Transportation and Development The bridge opened on June 9, 1930, and along with the Chef Menteur Bridge provided a free route between New Orleans and the Mississippi Gulf Coast. West of the bridge was the site of Jayne Mansfield's death in June 1967. A new span was constructed just to the north of the old span.

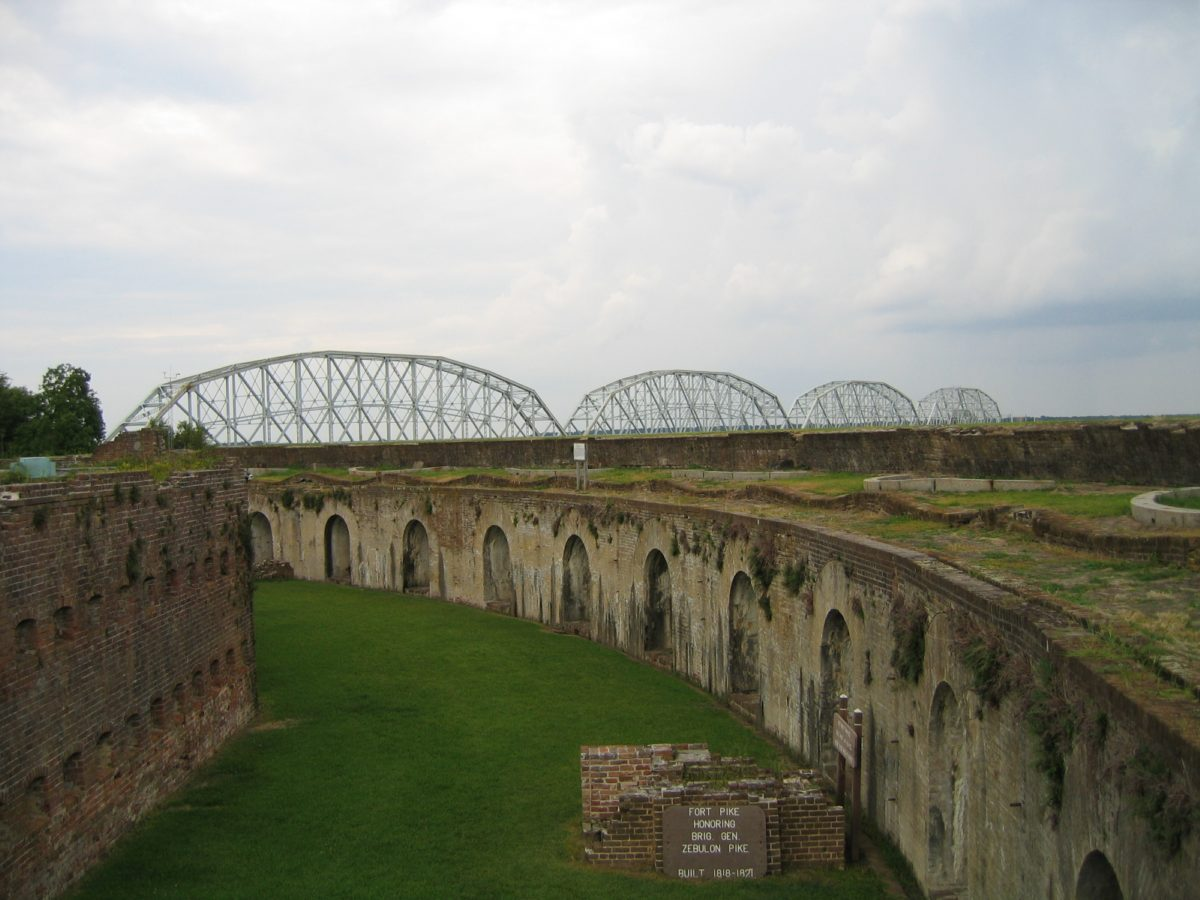
Old Rigolets Bridge seen from Fort Pike, 2003

== High-rise replacement ==
Construction of a new $50 million high-rise bridge began in October 2004. The new bridge was built by Massman Construction Co., of Kansas City, MO. It was delayed by Hurricane Katrina in 2005, which pushed a devastating storm surge through the area. The new bridge is just over one mile (1.6 km) in length and features two 12-foot (3.7 m) lanes with 8-foot (2.4 m) shoulders on both sides. The bridge rises to 72 feet (22 m) to allow marine traffic to pass without interruption of bridge traffic. The new span opened to traffic on January 15, 2008. After completion of the new span, the old bridge was demolished.
