= Sadou, Louisiana =

Unincorporated community in Louisiana, U.S.

Coordinates: 30°14′15″N 92°08′34″W

Sadou is an unincorporated community in Lafayette Parish, Louisiana, United States.

The community is located near the intersection of US Hwy 90 and LA Hwy 724.
