= Interstate 210 (Louisiana) =

Highway in Louisiana

Interstate 210
- Lake Charles Bypass; 1st Lt. Douglas B. Fournet Memorial Parkway
- I-210 highlighted in red

Route information
- Auxiliary route of I-10
- Maintained by Louisiana DOTD
- Length: 12.40 mi (19.96 km)
- Existed: 1962–present
- NHS: Entire route

Major junctions
- West end: I-10 east of Sulphur
- US 90 in Lake Charles
- East end: I-10 northeast of Lake Charles

Location
- Country: United States
- State: Louisiana
- Parishes: Calcasieu

Highway system
- Interstate Highway System; Main; Auxiliary; Suffixed; Business; Future; Louisiana State Highway System; Interstate; US; State; Scenic
← LA 191	→ I-220

Interstate 210 (I-210) in Louisiana, also known as the Lake Charles Bypass and officially known as the 1st Lt. Douglas B. Fournet Memorial Parkway, is a 12.40-mile-long (19.96 km) bypass route in Lake Charles, in the southwestern part of the state. As a bypass of I-10, both ends of I-210 meet with I-10.

== Route description ==
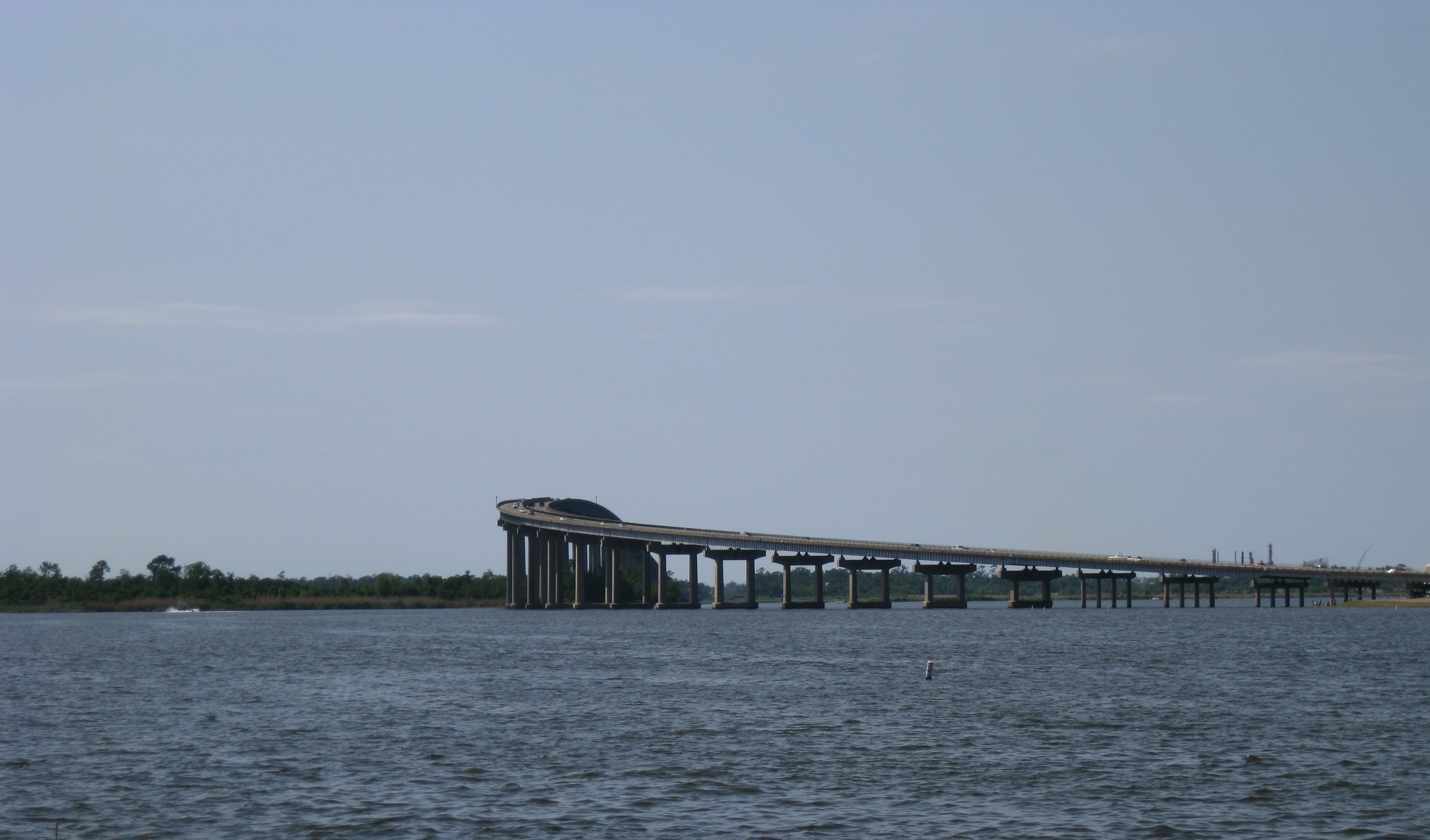
Israel LaFleur Bridge

The western terminus connects with I-10 east of Sulphur, heading southeast as it bypasses central Lake Charles around the southside. One mile (1.6 km) east of the western terminus, I-210 rises over the Israel LaFleur Bridge, one of the highest bridges in the Interstate Highway System, to pass over the Calcasieu Ship Channel. At the southeastern end of the bridge, the highway meets with exit 3, Prien Lake Road, eastbound. I-210 heads east through Lake Charles, turning 90 degrees at exit 8, LA 14/Gerstner Memorial Drive. The highway then heads north toward its eastern terminus with I-10 just east of Lake Charles. Though portions of the freeway run north–south, the entire route is signed east–west.

All of I-210 is included as part of the National Highway System, a system of roadways important to the nation's economy, defense, and mobility.

== History ==
I-210, including the Israel LaFleur Bridge, was constructed between its western terminus and Prien Lake Road circa 1963 to 1965. Initially, the western terminus at I-10 consisted solely of eastbound entrance and westbound exit ramps. The eastern remainder of I-210 was built circa 1975 to 1976, and westbound entrance / eastbound exit ramps were added to the western terminus in 1986.

Much of the area surrounding I-210 in southern Lake Charles was developed prior to construction of the freeway. As a result, many homes and businesses in its path were demolished.

The freeway remained largely unchanged from its original configuration until 2005, when construction of the L'Auberge du Lac Casino Resort resulted in the addition of a ramp linked to the Nelson Road interchange. Between 2013 and 2015, the Prien Lake Road interchange was rebuilt to allow access to the Golden Nugget Lake Charles.

During the planning phase of the freeway, it was known as the South City Bypass. Older signage (prior to the 2000s) referred to the road as the Lake Charles Loop. In 2013, I-210 was designated as the 1st Lieutenant Doug Fournet Memorial Parkway by the Louisiana Department of Transportation.

== Exit list ==
The entire highway is in Calcasieu Parish.

Location	mi	km	Exit	Destinations	Notes
	0.0– 0.7	0.0– 1.1	1B	I-10 – Beaumont, Lake Charles	Western terminus; exit number signed to I-10 east only; exit 25 on I-10
	0.5	0.80	1A	East Sulphur, Industries	Eastbound entrance and westbound exit; to Pete Manena Road (not signed)
Lake Charles	1.5– 3.1	2.4– 5.0	Israel LaFleur Bridge over Calcasieu Ship Channel / Indian Bay		
Lake Charles	3.2	5.1	3	Prien Lake Road, Golden Nugget Boulevard	
Lake Charles	4.1– 4.7	6.6– 7.6	4	LA 1138-2 (Nelson Road), L'Auberge Boulevard	
Lake Charles	5.4– 5.7	8.7– 9.2	5	Lake Street	
Lake Charles	6.1– 6.6	9.8– 10.6	6	LA 385 (Ryan Street)	
Lake Charles	6.9– 7.5	11.1– 12.1	7	Enterprise Boulevard, Louisiana Avenue	
Lake Charles	8.4– 9.0	13.5– 14.5	8	LA 14 – Cameron	To Gerstner Memorial Drive (not signed)
Lake Charles	10.1– 10.7	16.3– 17.2	10	Legion Street	Legion Street is LA 1138-3 (not signed)
Lake Charles	11.0– 11.9	17.7– 19.2	11	US 90 Bus. (Broad Street) / US 90 (Fruge Street)	Eastbound exit and westbound entrance for Broad Street; eastbound entrance and westbound exit for Fruge Street
	12.2– 12.7	19.6– 20.4	12	I-10 – Lake Charles, Lafayette	Eastern terminus; exit number signed for I-10 west only; exit 34 on I-10
1.000 mi = 1.609 km; 1.000 km = 0.621 mi: Incomplete access
