= Fort Pike =

- U.S. National Register of Historic Places
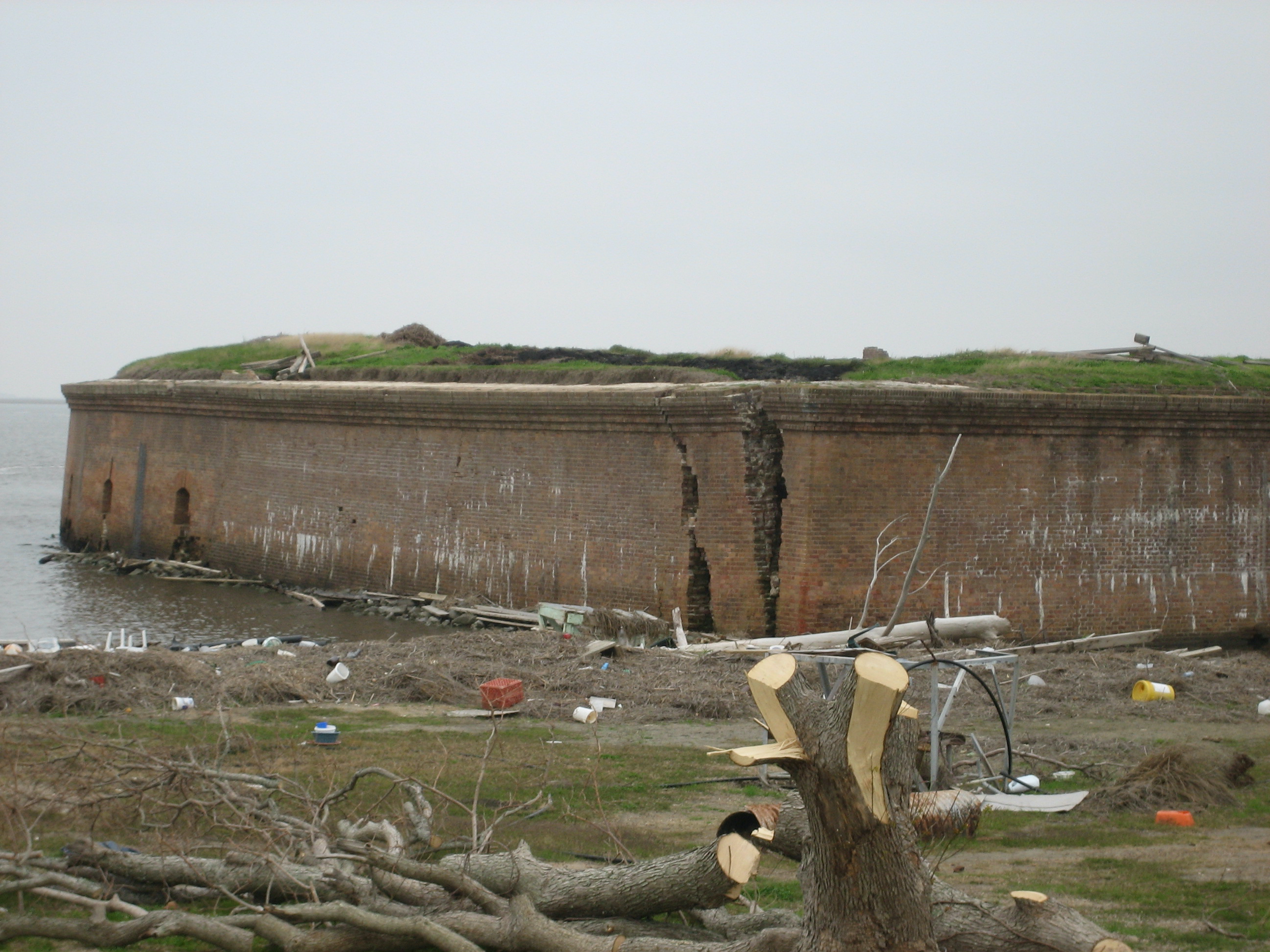
- Cracks can be seen in the brick structure of Fort Pike after Hurricane Katrina.

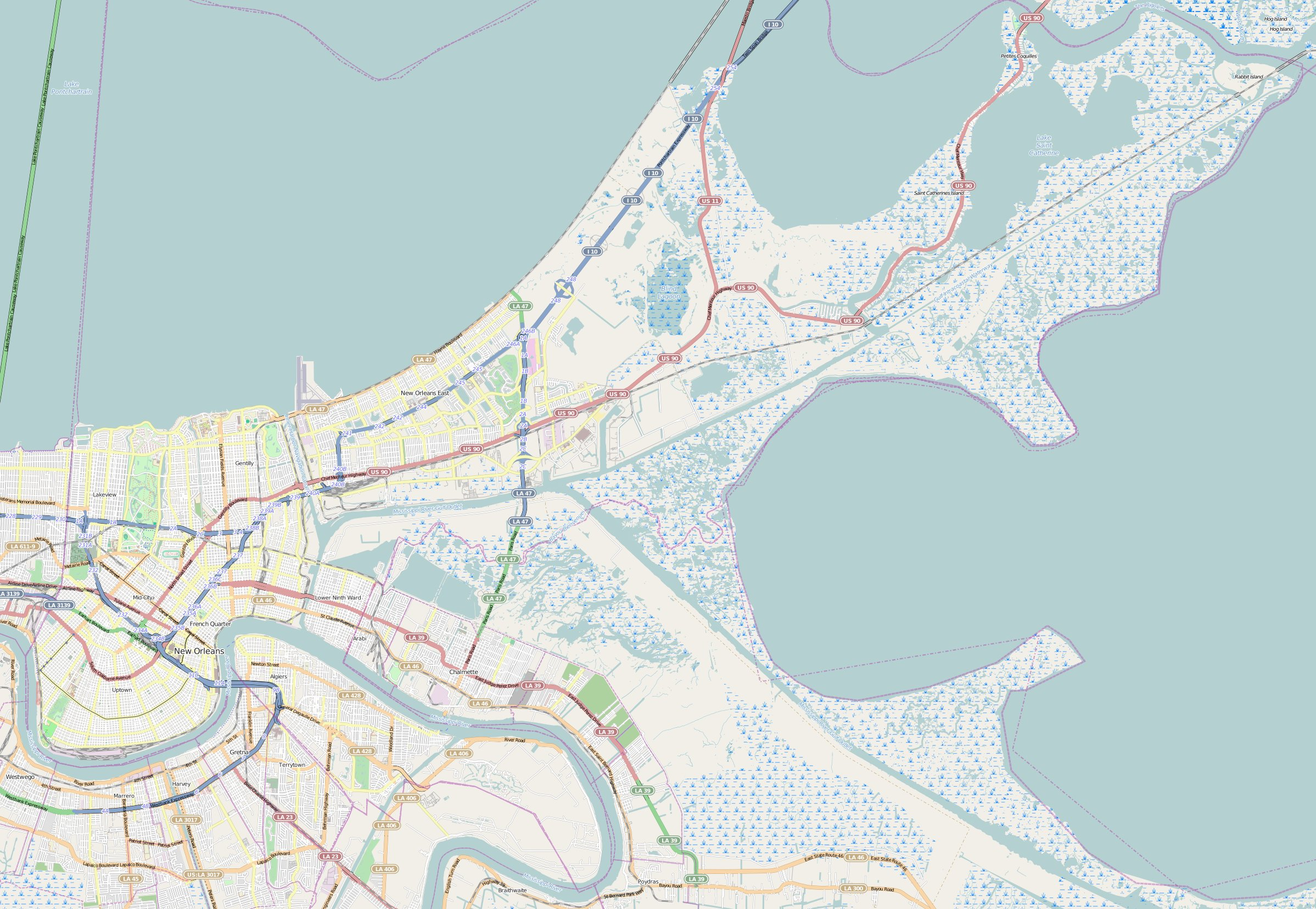
- Location within New Orleans Location within Louisiana Location within the United States
- Location: Orleans Parish, Louisiana
- Nearest city: New Orleans and Slidell
- Coordinates: 30°9′58″N 89°44′13″W
- Area: 9.6 acres (3.9 ha)
- Built: 1819
- NRHP reference No.: 72000557
- Added to NRHP: August 14, 1972

Fort Pike State Historic Site is a decommissioned 19th-century United States fort, named after Brigadier General Zebulon Pike. It was built following the War of 1812 to guard the Rigolets pass in Louisiana, a strait from the Gulf of Mexico, via Lake Borgne, to Lake Pontchartrain bordering New Orleans. It was located near the community of Petite Coquille, now within the city limits of New Orleans.

The fort's ruins have long been a tourist attraction with periods of abandonment. The fort was damaged by the Hurricane Katrina storm surge in 2005, and closed for a period. It also had to be closed following Hurricanes Gustav and Isaac in 2008 and 2012, respectively.

== History ==
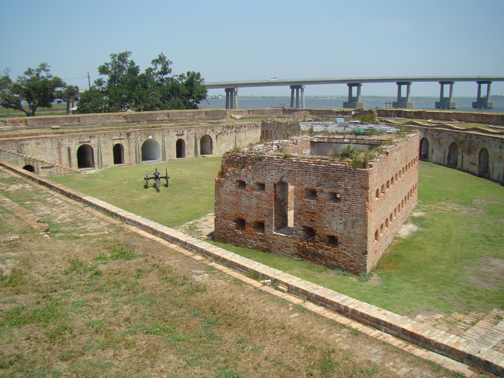
Fort Pike Citadel

A fort had been constructed in 1793 at Petit Coquilles, and was the intended destination of Jones's gunboat squadron prior to the Battle of Lake Borgne. General Jackson's engineer, Major Latour, lamented upon the state of the fort in 1814. Postwar, it was decided to improve the coastal defences with the creation of Fort Pike commencing in 1819 to replace the earlier fort. It was the first of three forts to be constructed in Louisiana under the postwar "Third System", along with Fort Jackson, Louisiana, and Fort Livingston, Louisiana. During the Seminole Wars in Florida through the 1820s, the US temporarily held Seminole Indians here who had been taken prisoner. They were eventually transported to the Seminole Reservation in Indian Territory (now Oklahoma.)

The Louisiana Continental Guard took control of the fort in 1861, just weeks before Louisiana joined the Confederacy and the American Civil War began.

When Union forces captured New Orleans in 1862, the Confederate forces evacuated Fort Pike. The Union reestablished control of the installation, using it as a base for raids. The fort also became a site for training of United States Colored Troops, established in 1864. These soldiers in the South included mostly former slaves.

The fort was abandoned by the United States Army in 1890. No cannon was ever fired in battle at Fort Pike. It was listed on the National Register of Historic Places in 1972. It was maintained as part of a state park, known as the Fort Pike State Historic Site.

Before Hurricane Katrina, the fort's brick-and-mortar structure was decaying. The 2005 storm surge exacerbated the problems. It temporarily completely submerged the entire fort, and destroyed adjacent state park buildings. The site officially reopened on May 2, 2008. However, due to damage caused by Hurricane Gustav in early September 2008, the park was closed indefinitely. As of June 2009, the fort was open. It is undergoing extensive repairs and restoration work. After Hurricane Isaac in 2012, the fort was closed indefinitely pending repairs and debris cleanup.

The fort was re-opened to visitors following Hurricane Isaac, but closed again in February 2015 due to state budget cuts.

== Representation in media ==
- The fort was used in the final sequence of the 1974 film Nightmare Honeymoon.
- The fort was used in the 2013 film G.I. Joe: Retaliation, and represented Fort Sumter of Charleston, South Carolina, where the opening shots of the Civil War were fired.
- The fort was used in a scene of the 2016 NCIS: New Orleans episode "Second Chances" (season 2, episode 16).
- The fort was also used in the movie Jonah Hex

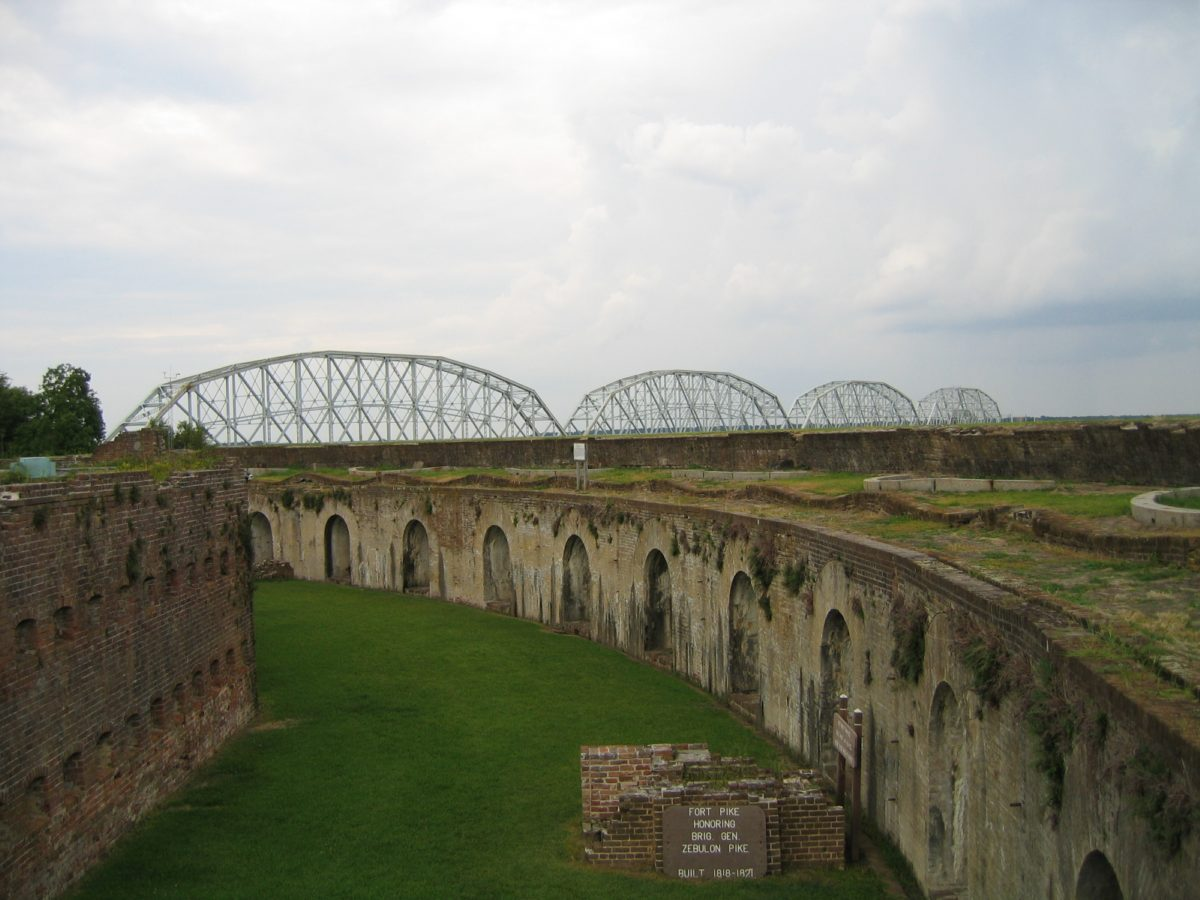
Picture of Fort Pike, before Hurricane Katrina, looking toward the Old Rigolets Bridge (US 90)

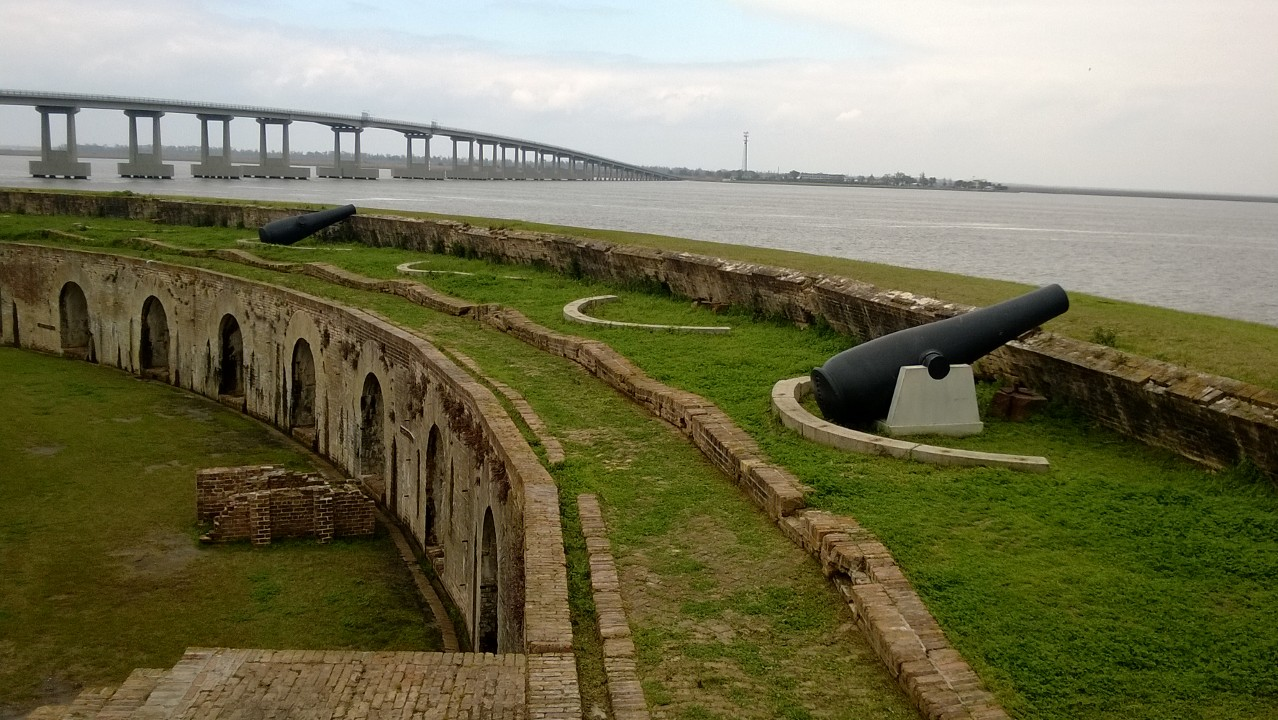
Picture of Fort Pike, post-Katrina (New Hwy 90 Bridge in Background)

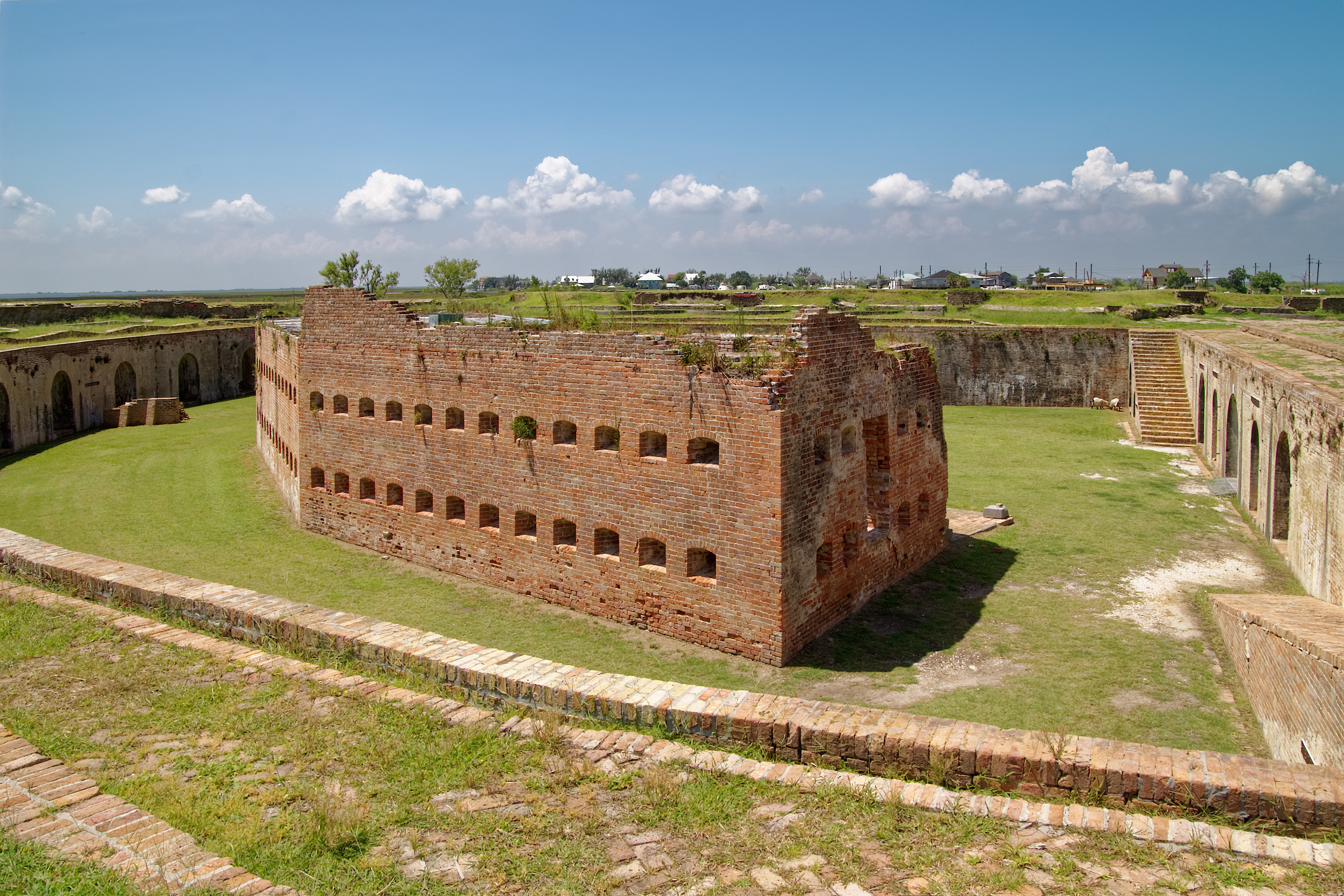
Fort Pike's citadel as seen from atop its rampart (above casemates along the Rigolets, looking south-southwest)

Fort Pike, showing tunnel to casemate northeast of main entrance, casemate itself, gun port, and cannon on display across moat from gun port, between main fort and glacis

Fort Pike's casemates along the Rigolets, December 28, 2002

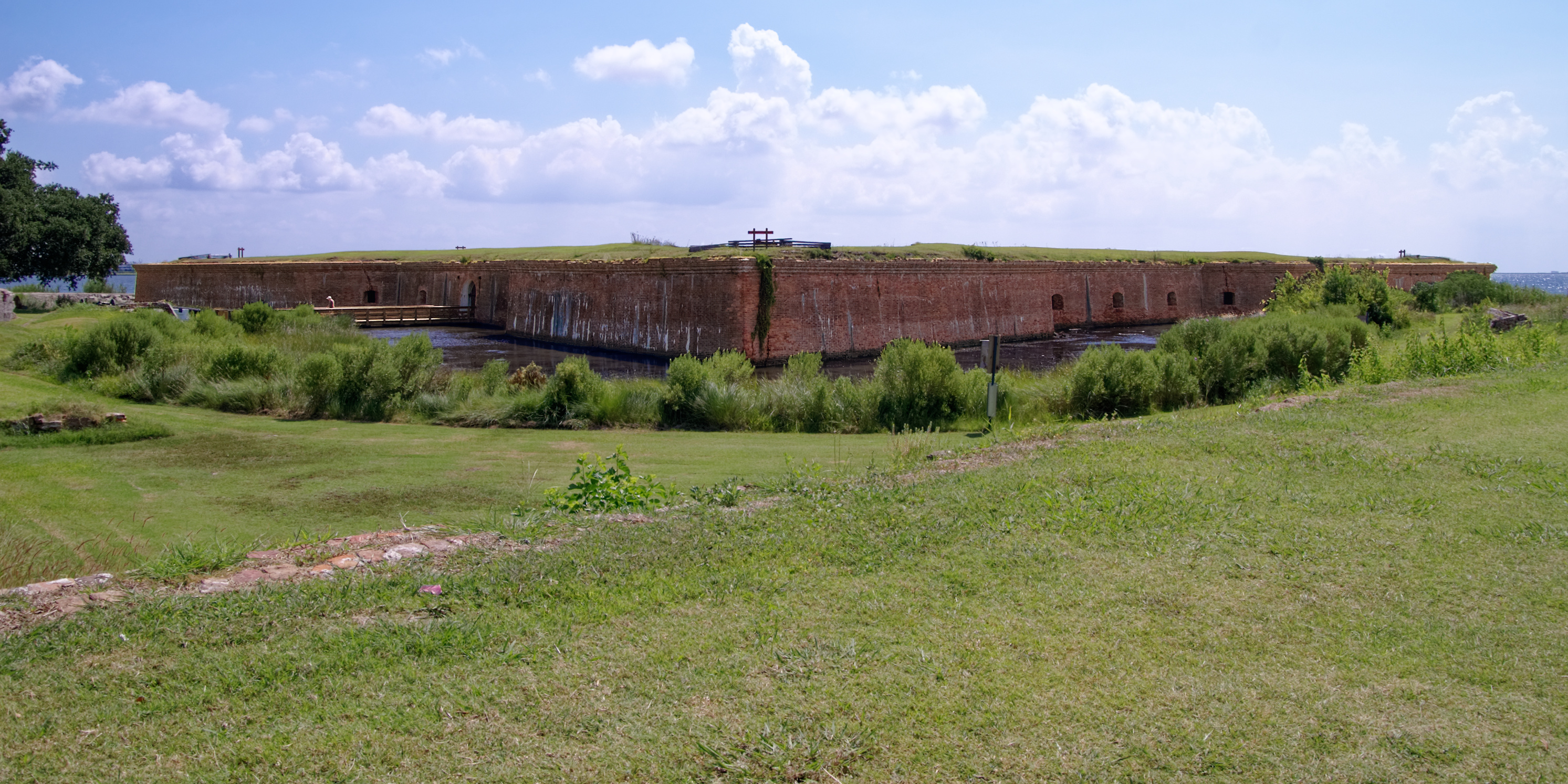
Fort Pike's landward sides, seen from its glacis, July 2008

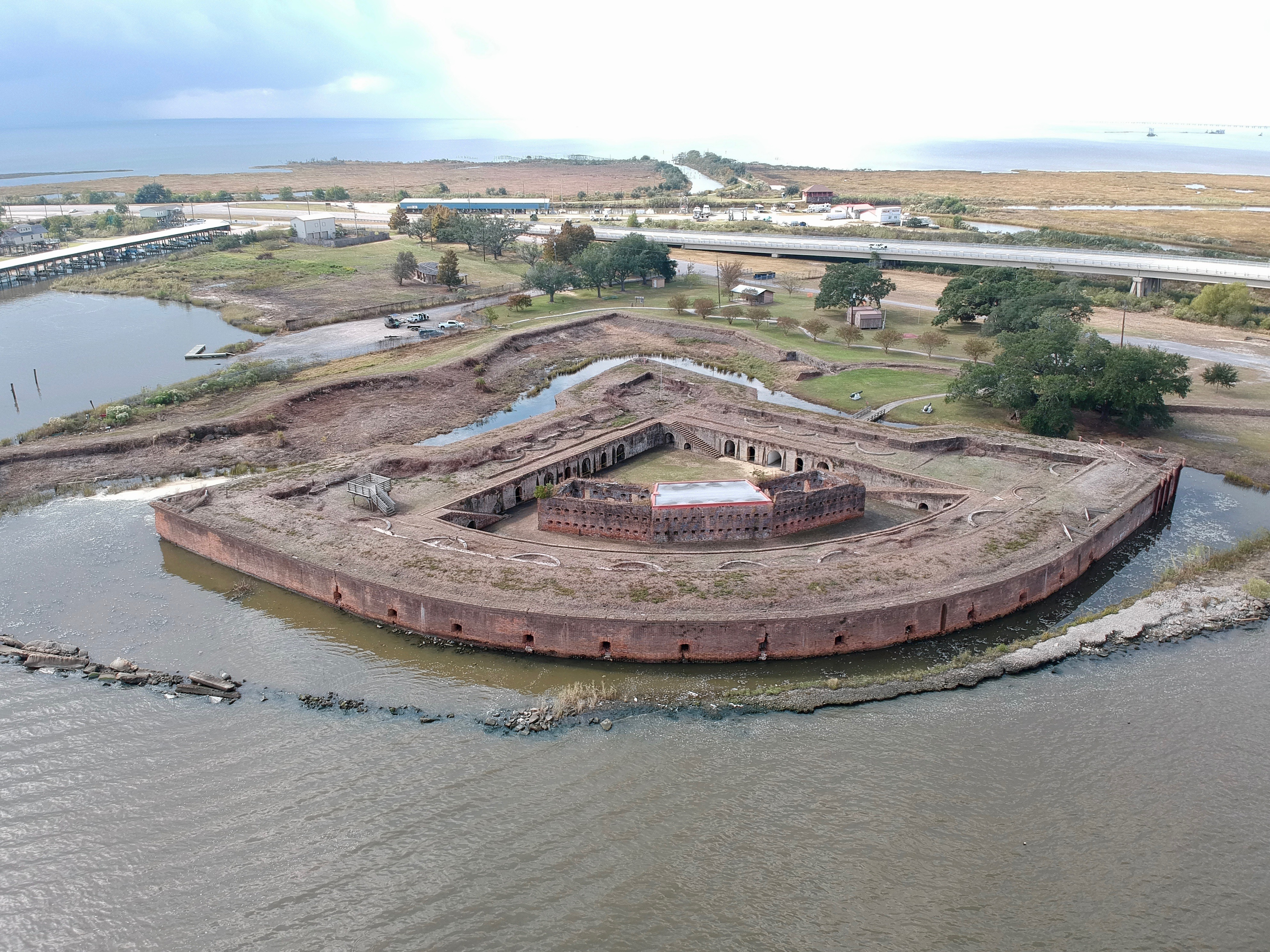
Aerial view of Fort Pike taken November 2019

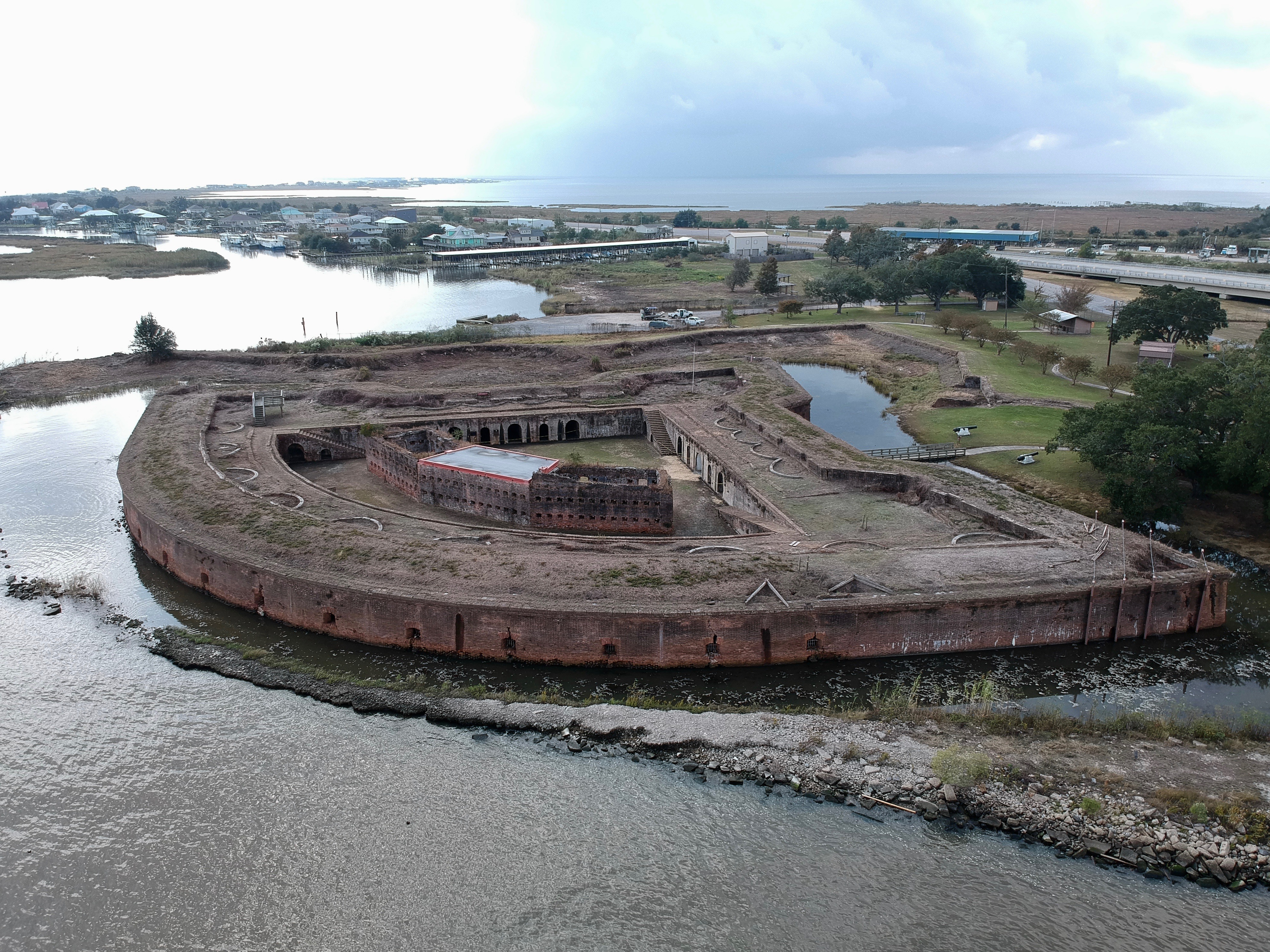
Aerial view of Fort Pike taken November 2019

== See also ==
- Fort Macomb
- List of Louisiana state historic sites
