= White Kitchen, Louisiana =

Unincorporated community in Louisiana

- Unincorporated community
- The old sign at White Kitchen photographed in 1982.

- Location within Louisiana Location within the United States
- Coordinates: 30°13′41″N 89°40′38″W
- Country: United States
- State: Louisiana
- Parish: St. Tammany
- Elevation: 7 ft (2.1 m)
- Time zone: UTC-6 (Central (CST))
  - Summer (DST): UTC-5 (CDT)
- ZIP code: 70435
- Area code: 985
- GNIS feature ID: 1628494
- FIPS code: 22-81525

White Kitchen is an unincorporated community in St. Tammany Parish, Louisiana, United States. The community is located at the intersection of U.S. Route 90 and U.S. Route 190 and approximately 7 miles (11 kilometres) southeast of Slidell. The West Pearl River flows past about one mile to the east and Pearlington, Mississippi is about five miles to the east.

== Etymology ==
The name of the community is derived from a local restaurant that was built in 1931.
