= Chef Menteur Bridge =

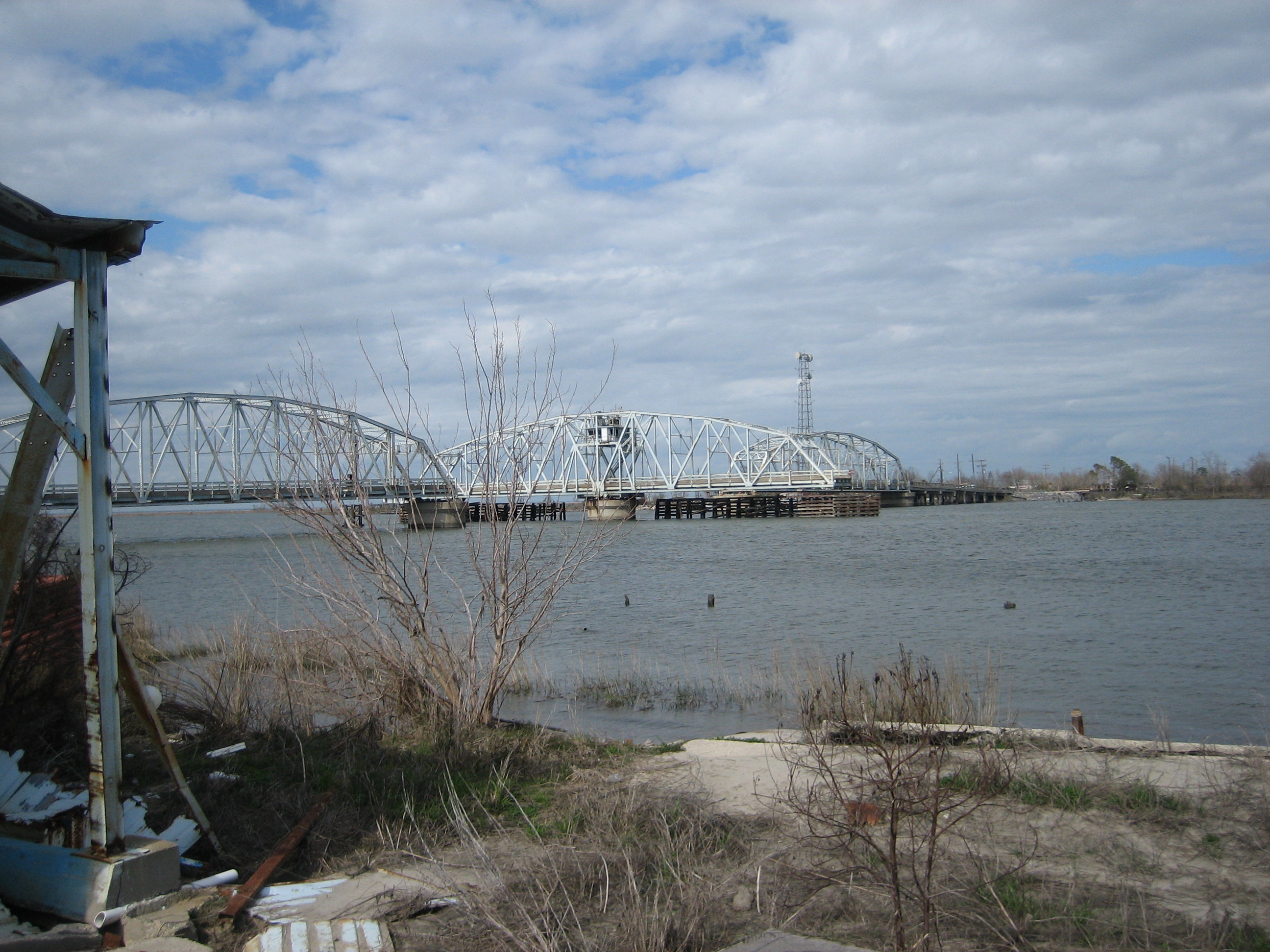
- Coordinates: 30°04′04″N 89°48′15″W
- Carries: 2 lanes of US 90
- Crosses: Chef Menteur Pass
- Locale: New Orleans and Slidell, Louisiana

Characteristics
- Design: Truss swing bridge
- Total length: 1,174.5 feet (358.0 m)
- Width: 20 feet (6.1 m)
- Longest span: 269.9 feet (82.3 m)
- Clearance above: 14.2 feet (4.3 m)

History
- Opened: 1929

Statistics
- Daily traffic: 3,500

The Chef Menteur Bridge (also known as the Chef Menteur Pass Bridge) is a bridge which connects between New Orleans and Slidell, Louisiana. It carries U.S. Route 90 (US 90) across Chef Menteur Pass on the eastern side of Lake Pontchartrain.
