= U.S. Route 90 =

Highway in the United States

U.S. Route 90
- US 90 highlighted in red

Route information
- Length: 1,633 mi (2,628 km)
- Existed: 1926–present

Major junctions
- West end: I-10 BL in Van Horn, TX
- I-10 / I-35 in San Antonio, TX; I-45 in Houston, TX; I-69 / US 59 in Houston, TX; I-10 in New Orleans, LA; US 11 in New Orleans, LA; US 49 in Gulfport, MS; I-65 in Mobile, AL; I-75 in Lake City, FL; I-95 in Jacksonville, FL; US 1 in Jacksonville, FL
- East end: SR A1A in Jacksonville Beach, FL

Location
- Country: United States
- States: Texas, Louisiana, Mississippi, Alabama, Florida

Highway system
- United States Numbered Highway System; List; Special; Divided
← US 89	→ US 91

U.S. Route 90 or U.S. Highway 90 (US 90) is an east–west major United States highway in the Southern United States. Despite the "0" in its route number, US 90 never was a full coast-to-coast route. It generally travels near Interstate 10 (I-10) and passes through the southern states of Texas, Louisiana, Mississippi, Alabama, and Florida. US 90 also includes part of the DeSoto Trail between Tallahassee and Lake City, Florida.

With the exception of a short-lived northward extension to US 62/US 180 near Pine Springs, Texas, that existed for less than one year, its western terminus has always been at Van Horn, Texas; this is an intersection with I-10 Business (formerly US 80) just north of an interchange with I-10. Its eastern terminus is at Florida State Road A1A in Jacksonville Beach, Florida, three blocks from the Atlantic Ocean.

On August 29, 2005, a number of the highway's bridges in Mississippi and Louisiana were destroyed or damaged due to Hurricane Katrina, including the Bay St. Louis Bridge, the Biloxi Bay Bridge, and the Fort Pike Bridge which have been replaced.

== Route description ==
Lengths
	mi	km
TX	763	1228
LA	300	483
MS	79	128
AL	77	124
FL	409	658
Total	1633	2628

=== Texas ===
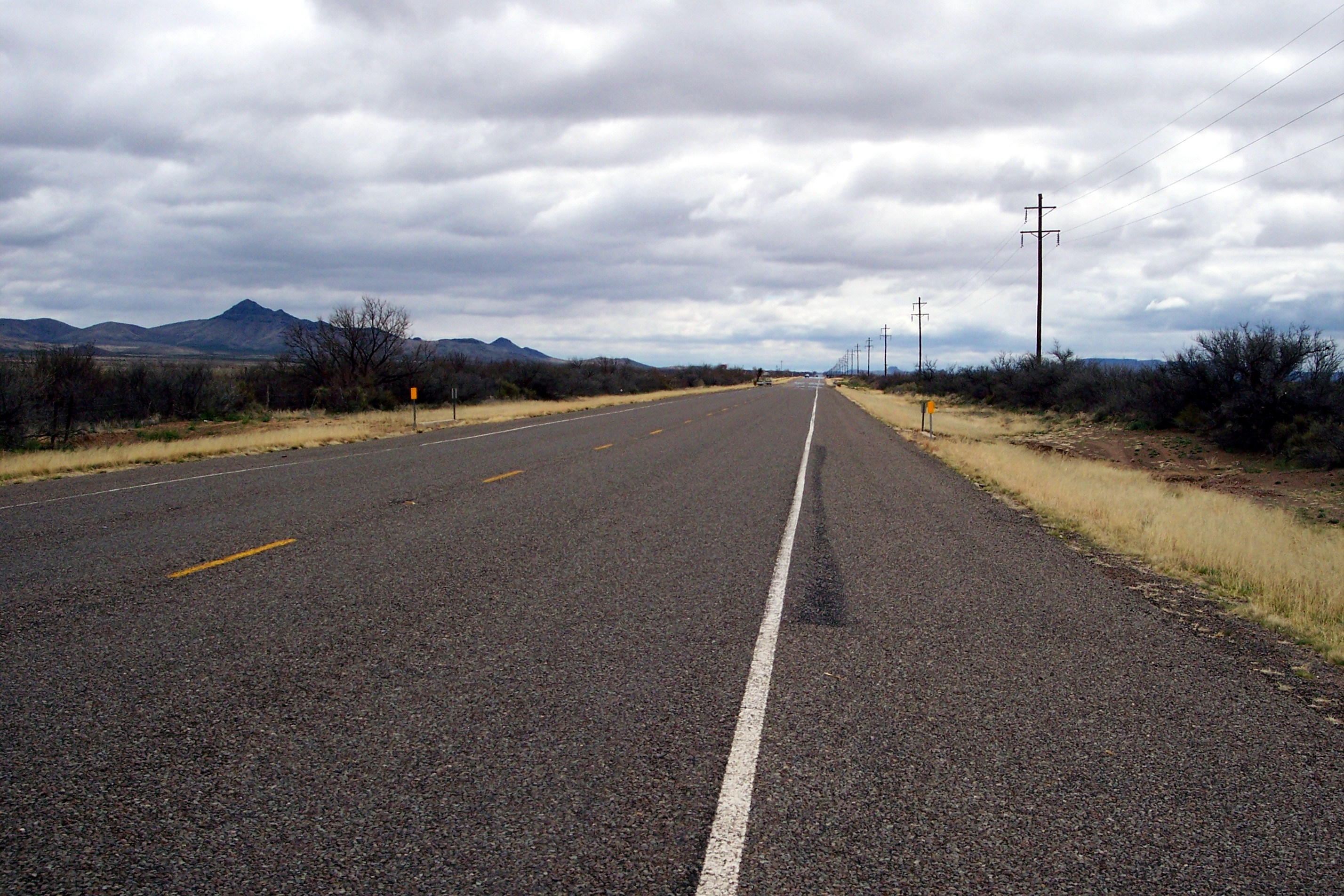
US 90 south of Van Horn

US 90 begins at an intersection with BL I-10 and SH 54 in downtown Van Horn. It then heads south-southeast towards Marfa, where the route begins to head generally east. The route mostly consists of two lanes west of Uvalde. At this point, it becomes a four-lane surface road until it reaches western Bexar County where it becomes a freeway, joining I-10 in Downtown San Antonio. This concurrency with I-10 continues intermittently into western Houston, where US 90 follows the Katy Freeway. The section of US 90 that is multiplexed with I-10 through Houston is the only section of the route that is unsigned. In eastern Houston, US 90 splits from I-10 and heads northeast towards Liberty, eventually traveling through downtown Beaumont where it rejoins I-10 for the rest of its routing through Texas.

The speed limit on US 90 between Van Horn and Del Rio is mainly 75 miles per hour (121 km/h). Beginning at Seguin, US 90 Alternate splits from US 90 and travels parallel to the south, rejoining the main route in northeast Houston.

In 1991, the construction on a four- to six-lane freeway northeast of Houston in Harris County was completed along a new routing for US 90; that portion was designated the Crosby Freeway. This segment traveled from just inside Beltway 8 to east of the town of Crosby. Construction began in 2006 to extend the freeway westward to the intersection of I-10 (East Freeway) and the I-610 (East Loop). On January 24, 2011, the new extension officially opened. Due to lack of funds, overpasses were not built over Greens Bayou and over future Purple Sage Road, leaving traffic to briefly exit to the frontage roads before rejoining the freeway.

=== Louisiana ===
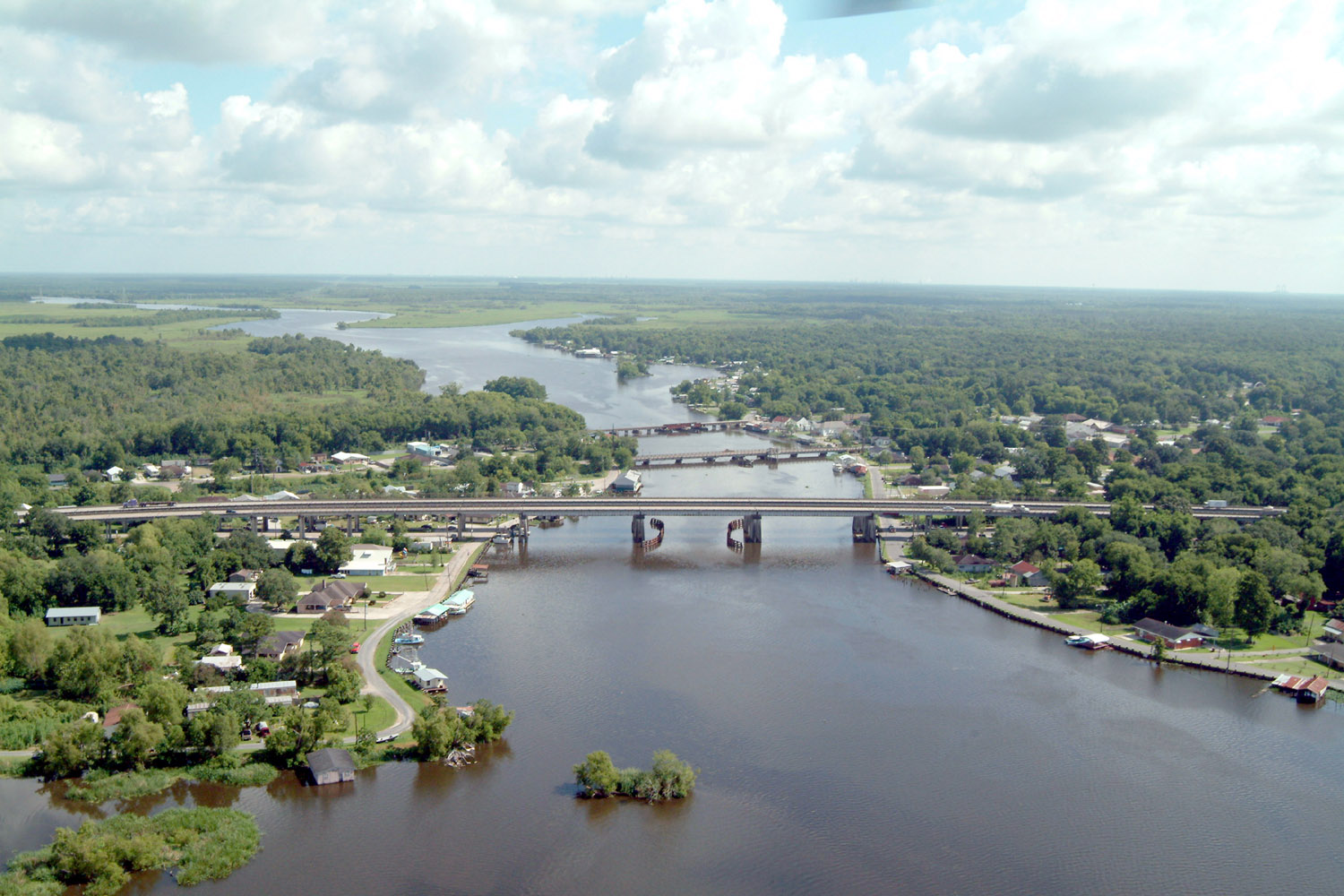
US 90 (foreground) crossing Bayou des Allemands at the town of Des Allemands in Louisiana

Entering Louisiana from the west, US 90 and I-10 travel side by side through Lake Charles to Lafayette. In Lafayette, US 90 and I-10 part ways: I-10 proceeds east to Baton Rouge, while US 90 takes a southern turn and passes through New Iberia, Franklin, Morgan City, and the Houma – Bayou Cane – Thibodaux metropolitan area before reaching New Orleans. The four-laning of US 90 was pushed in the 1990s by former State Senator Carl W. Bauer through his role as the chairman of the Governor's Interstate 49 Task Force while also a member of the Greater Lafayette Chamber of Commerce.

The portion of US 90 from Lafayette to New Orleans is designated to become the corridor for I-49. In New Orleans, US 90 again meets up with I-10, and the two highways follow a similar path into Mississippi.

=== Mississippi ===
The description of US 90's route in Mississippi is explained in State Code § 65-3-3.

Prior to Hurricane Katrina, Mississippi's portion of US 90 was entirely four-lanes except for a very short segment at the state's west end leading to the old Pearl River Bridge into Louisiana. That segment of old highway is obviated for most purposes by an extension of the four-lane roadway from its split with US 90 to I-10 just east of the much newer Pearl Bridge.

Before Hurricane Camille in 1969, the 26-mile (42 km) stretch of US 90 from the Bay St. Louis Bridge at the west end to the Biloxi Bay Bridge at the east had views of the Gulf of Mexico on its south side and mansions — some antebellum — on its north. The median featured many old oak trees, a number of which survived the storm.

Many segments and important bridges were heavily damaged or destroyed by Hurricane Katrina in 2005. With the opening of two lanes of the Biloxi Bay Bridge on November 1, 2007, the entire route is now restored. Reconstruction projects continue on much of the highway and lane closures are common. Substantial completion of all US 90 Katrina-related road work in this state was scheduled to have been completed by now.

'US Highway 90 Project History' recounts in some detail this roadway's colorful past in Mississippi, dating back to the early 20th century when it was part of the Old Spanish Trail. The pdf document is available at the 'Project Updates' page of the Mississippi Department of Transportation's website (www.gomdot.com).

=== Alabama ===
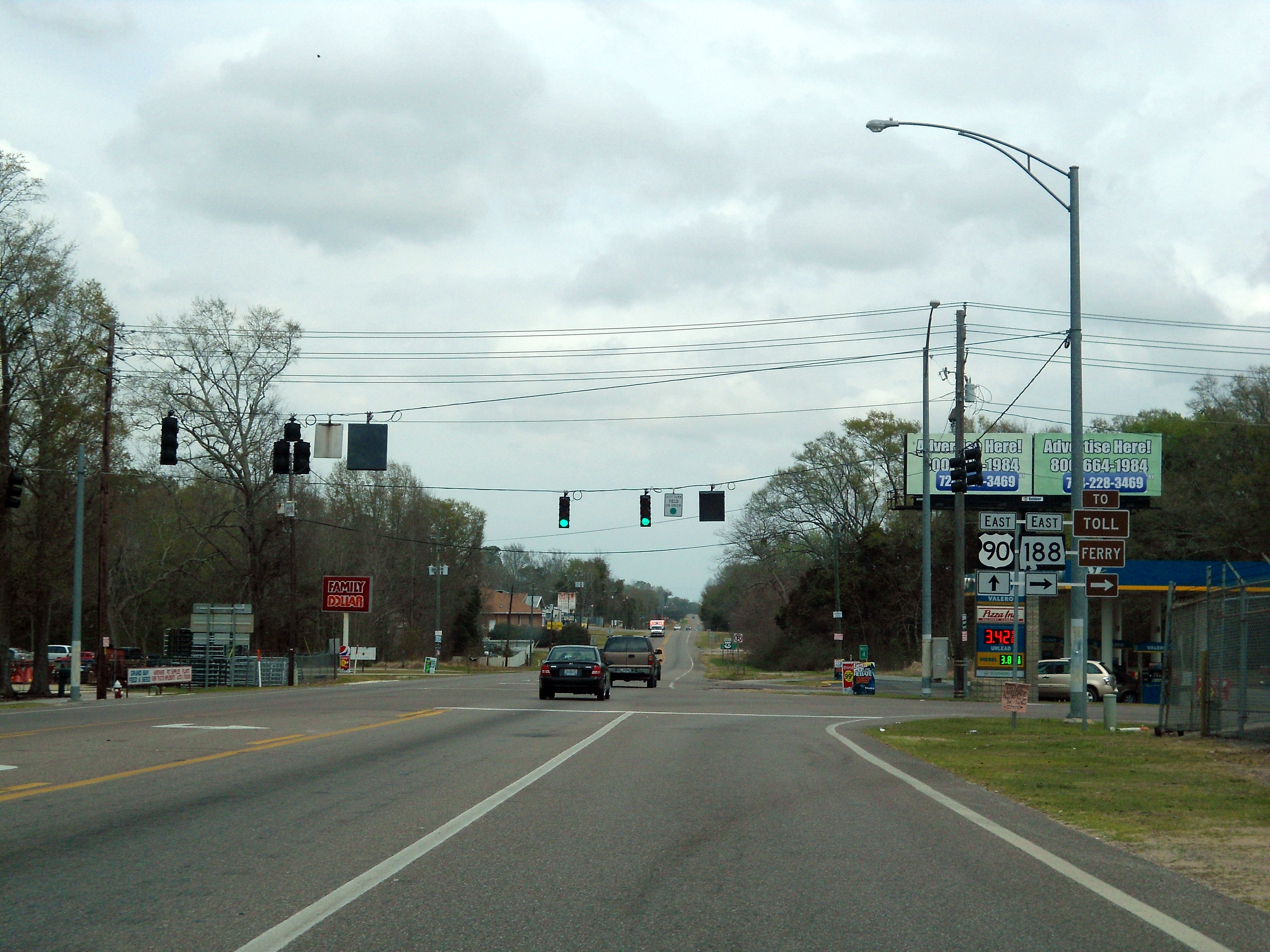
US 90/Alabama State Route 188 concurrency ends in Grand Bay.

US 90, internally designated by the Alabama Department of Transportation as State Route 16 (SR 16), is a major east–west state highway across the southern part of the U.S. state of Alabama. US 90/SR 16 crosses the extreme southern part of the state, covering approximately 77 miles (124 km). The routes pass through Baldwin County before entering the city of Mobile where it gains a wrong way concurrency with US 98. and later joins US Truck Route 98, briefly also overlapping Interstate 165. The portion of US 90 that crosses Mobile Bay is locally referred to as the "Causeway". With the completion of I-10, US 90/SR 16 serves primarily as a local route connecting the towns along its path.

=== Florida ===
A US 90 shield used in Florida prior to 1993

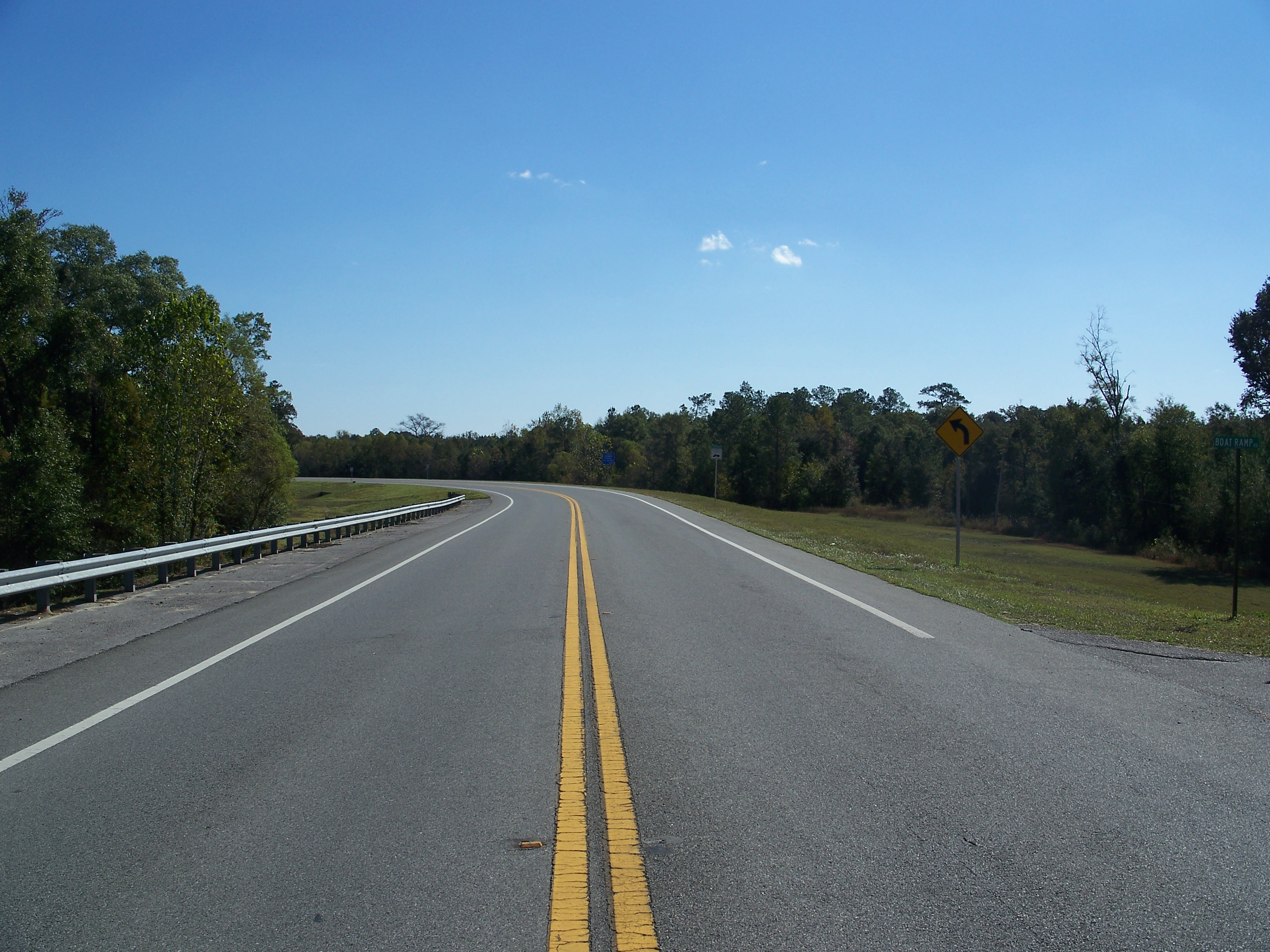
US 90, near the Choctawhatchee River, looking east

As it enters the Sunshine State, US 90 shifts south towards Pensacola while US 90 Alternate stays to the north of the city. This stretch of highway is also known as Nine Mile Road. After Hurricane Ivan destroyed the I-10 Bridge in Northwest Florida, motorists waited as long as two hours to cross the Escambia bridge between Santa Rosa and Escambia counties.

The highway's route continues to the north of I-10 as a two-lane highway through most of the sparsely populated inland areas of the panhandle, becoming four lanes through and near several towns. In Gadsden County, US 90 cuts to the southeast toward downtown Tallahassee, where it passes the north entrance of Florida State University and expands to six lanes until its intersection with US 27.

In 2026, a portion of the highway, between Lancelot Road and Oakridge Way, was named “Deputy William May Memorial Highway”, in honor of fallen police officer William May. The portion of the highway that extends through Midway has been designated as the Alfred Lawson, Jr. Highway. Continuing east, the highway is a two-lane road north of I-10 along the rest of its route, except as it turns to the south to pass through Lake City at I-75. After going through the Osceola National Forest, it passes I-295 heading into Jacksonville, becoming four lanes through the industrialized west side as Beaver Street, and through downtown as Union Street. It crosses the St. Johns River on the Main Street Bridge and continues east as Beach Boulevard to its terminus at Florida State Road A1A in Jacksonville Beach.

US 90 passes through the county seats of 15 counties on its course in Florida, and is never more than 6 miles (9.7 km) from I-10 throughout the state. The highway's hidden state road designation is primarily Florida State Road 10 (Florida State Road 10A in Pensacola), but along Beach Boulevard in Jacksonville it becomes Florida State Road 212.

The speed limit is 55 mph (89 km/h) for all rural points west of Monticello, Florida, and it is 60 mph (97 km/h) on all rural points beginning in Madison County to Glen St. Mary.

== History ==
=== Hurricane Katrina ===
The US 90 bridge between Bay Saint Louis, Mississippi, and Pass Christian, Mississippi, as well as the bridge between Biloxi, Mississippi, and Ocean Springs, Mississippi, were destroyed by Hurricane Katrina in August 2005. During the storm, the St. Louis Bay bridge was under water and destroyed. Portions of US 90 were damaged along the Battleship Parkway on Mobile Bay in Baldwin County, Alabama. Sections of the highway in Harrison County, Mississippi, including other bridges and much of the roadbed, were damaged or destroyed. Both the Rigolets Bridge and the Chef Menteur Bridge across Chef Menteur Pass in New Orleans East were damaged, but have since been reopened. Some sections of the highway in New Orleans were impassable under flood waters for weeks due to the general flooding of that city; see Effect of Hurricane Katrina on New Orleans. The Crescent City Connection bridge over the Mississippi River in Sector 49, also known as US 90 Business, remained intact and was the only usable route out of that city in the immediate aftermath of the storm until the section of Leake Avenue/River Road between New Orleans and Metairie was able to be cleared of heavy debris, but was blocked off by Jefferson Parish and Gretna law enforcement officials in a politically controversial move to prevent the looting and general anarchy from spreading to the relatively intact west bank of the Mississippi River.

New US 90 bridge between Biloxi and Ocean Springs under construction

In mid-2006, construction began on the replacement for the Bay St. Louis bridge. It was completed on January 4, 2008, and includes four traffic lanes plus emergency shoulders and a bicycle/pedestrian path. It also stands 85 feet (26 m) high at its highest point. Two-way traffic resumed on the eastbound lanes of the bridge on May 17, 2007, after an afternoon ceremony, effectively ending the temporary ferry service. The remaining half of the bridge opened to traffic on January 4, 2008.

On June 6, 2006, a $338.6 million contract was let for the Biloxi-Ocean Springs replacement. The bridge will be 95 feet (29 m) tall at its highest point and will carry six traffic lanes, 8-foot-wide (2.4 m) inside and 10-foot-wide (3.0 m) outside shoulders, and a bicycle/pedestrian path. To many area residents' and leaders' delight, the bridge's westbound lanes opened to two-way traffic after a ceremony and parade on November 1, 2007, two weeks ahead of schedule. Total bridge construction, including the opening of all six lanes of traffic, was scheduled to be completed by April 2008.

After it was closed due to storm damage, the 1929 vintage bridge carrying US 90 over Chef Menteur Pass was repaired and opened to traffic on August 11, 2006.

=== Florida State Road 1 ===
- Florida State Road No. 1
- U.S. National Register of Historic Places
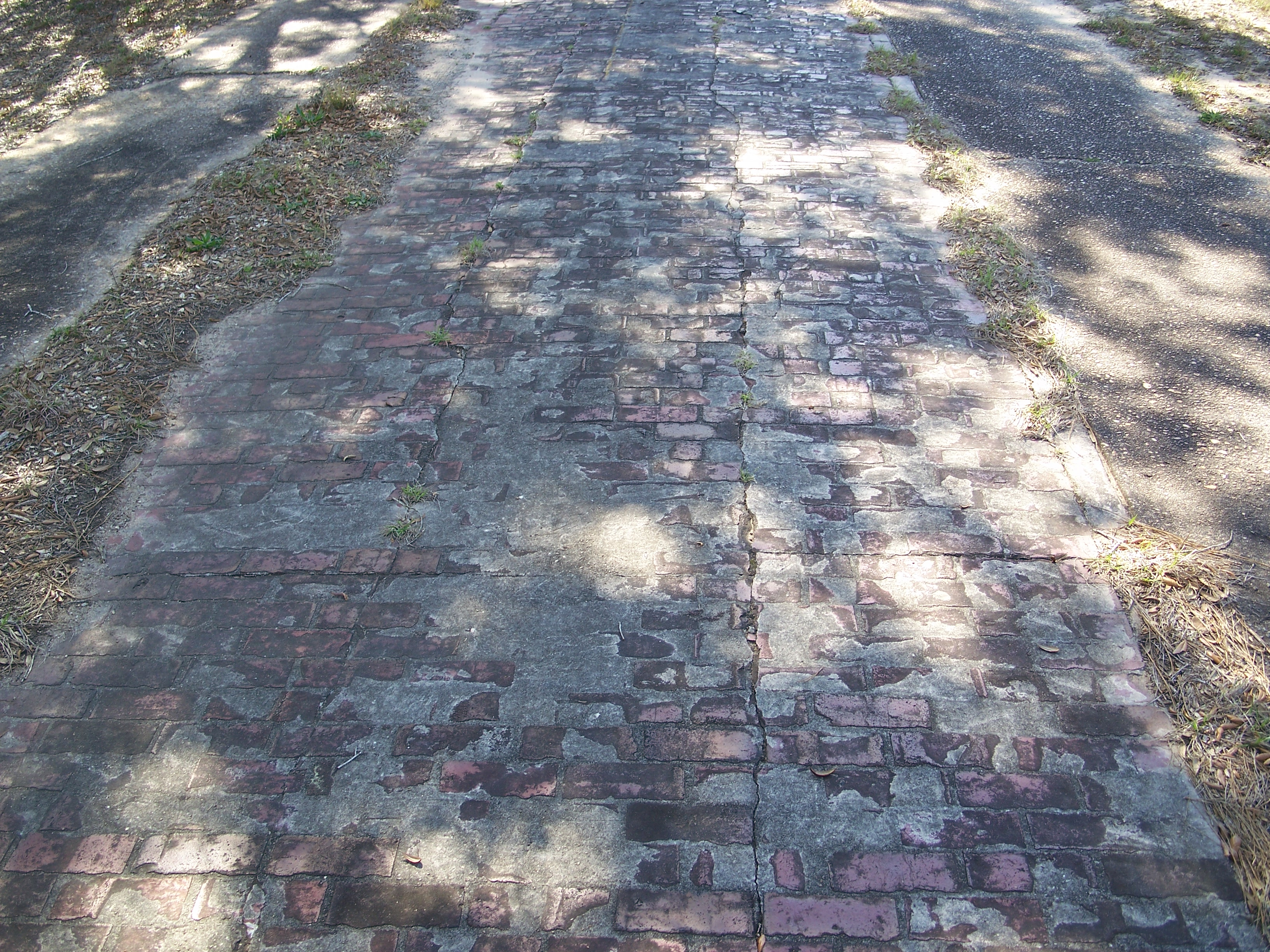
- Location: Santa Rosa County, Florida, US
- Nearest city: Milton, Florida
- NRHP reference No.: 94000626
- Added to NRHP: June 23, 1994

The Florida State Road No. 1 (also known as the Old Brick Road, Red Brick Road, U.S. Highway 90, or Old Spanish Trail) is a historic road near Milton, Florida. It is located, roughly, in three sections east of Milton, parallel to US 90, between Marquis Bayou and Harold. On June 23, 1994, it was added to the National Register of Historic Places.

== Major intersections ==
Texas
I-10 BL in Van Horn
I-10 in Van Horn
US 67 in Marfa. The highways travel concurrently to east-northeast of Alpine.
US 385 in Marathon. The highways travel concurrently to east of Marathon.
US 285 in Sanderson
US 277 / US 377 in Del Rio. The highways travel concurrently through Del Rio.
US 83 in Uvalde
I-410 in San Antonio
I-10 / I-35 / US 87 in San Antonio. I-10/US 90 travels concurrently to west-southwest of Seguin. US 87/US 90 travels concurrently through San Antonio.
I-37 / US 281 in San Antonio
I-410 in San Antonio
I-10 in Seguin
US 183 in Luling. The highways travels concurrently through Luling.
I-10 east of Waelder
US 77 in Schulenburg
I-10 east-northeast of Schulenburg
I-10 west-southwest of Glidden
I-10 east of Columbus. The highways travel concurrently to Sealy.
I-10 in Sealy. The highways travel concurrently to west-southwest of Brookshire.
I-10 in Katy. The highways travel concurrently to Houston.
I-610 in Houston
I-45 in Houston. The highways travel concurrently, but on different lanes, through Houston.
I-69 / US 59 in Houston
I-10 / I-610 in Houston
I-10 / US 69 / US 96 / US 287 in Beaumont
I-10 in Beaumont. The highways travel concurrently to Toomey, Louisiana.
Louisiana
I-10 west-southwest of Westlake. The highways travel concurrently to Lake Charles.
US 171 in Lake Charles
I-210 in Lake Charles
US 165 in Iowa
I-49 / US 167 in Lafayette. I-49/US 90 will travel concurrently to the Avondale–Bridge City city line. US 90/US 167 travels concurrently through Lafayette.
I-310 in Boutte
I-10 / I-49 / I-910 in New Orleans
US 61 in New Orleans
I-610 in New Orleans
I-10 in New Orleans
I-510 in New Orleans
US 11 in New Orleans
US 190 southeast of Slidell
Mississippi
I-310 / US 49 in Gulfport
I-110 in Biloxi
Alabama
I-10 on the Theodore–Tillmans Corner city line.
I-65 in Mobile
US 98 in Mobile. The highways travel concurrently through Mobile.
I-165 in Mobile. The highways travel concurrently through Mobile.
US 98 in Mobile. The highways travel concurrently to Spanish Fort.
I-10 in Mobile
I-10 in Spanish Fort
US 31 in Spanish Fort
I-10 / US 98 in Daphne. US 90/US 98 travels concurrently through Daphne.
Florida
US 98 in Pensacola. The highways travel concurrently through Pensacola.
US 29 in Pensacola
I-110 in Pensacola
I-10 in Ferry Pass
US 331 in DeFuniak Springs. The highways travel concurrently through DeFuniak Springs.
US 231 in Cottondale
I-10 in Midway
US 27 in Tallahassee
US 319 in Tallahassee
I-10 in Tallahassee
US 19 in Monticello
US 221 in Greenville. The highways travel concurrently through Greenville.
I-10 southeast of Falmouth
US 129 in Live Oak
I-75 in Lake City
US 41 in Lake City
US 441 in Lake City
I-10 southwest of Sanderson
US 301 in Baldwin. The highways travel concurrently through Baldwin.
I-95 in Jacksonville
US 1 in Jacksonville. the highways travel concurrently through Jacksonville.
I-95 in Jacksonville
I-295 in Jacksonville
SR A1A in Jacksonville Beach

== Special routes ==
- US 90 Bus. - Houston to Barrett, Texas
- US 90 Bus. - Orange, Texas
- US 90 Alt. - Quincy, Florida to Tallahassee, Florida
- US 90 Alt. - Seguin, Texas to Houston, Texas
- US 90 Alt. - Jacksonville, Florida
- US 90 Bus. - New Orleans, Louisiana

== See also ==
Browse numbered routes
← SH 89	TX	→ SH 90
← US 84	MS	→ US 98
← SR 15	SR 16	→ SR 17
← SR 89	AL	→ SR 91
← SR 87	FL	→ SR 90
