= List of state highways in Louisiana (750–799) =

The following is a list of state highways in the U.S. state of Louisiana designated in the 750–799 range.

== Louisiana Highway 750 ==
Louisiana Highway 750
- Location: St. Landry Parish
- Length: 3.7 mi (6.0 km)
- Existed: 1955–c. 1957

Louisiana Highway 750 (LA 750) ran 3.7 miles (6.0 km) in a general east–west direction from US 190 east of Swords to a second junction with US 190 west of Lawtell.

The entire route was in St. Landry Parish.

mi	km	Destinations	Notes
0.0	0.0	US 190 – Opelousas, Eunice	Western terminus
2.4	3.9	LA 103	
3.7	6.0	US 190 – Opelousas, Eunice	Eastern terminus
1.000 mi = 1.609 km; 1.000 km = 0.621 mi

== Louisiana Highway 751 ==
Louisiana Highway 751
- Location: St. Landry Parish
- Length: 5.726 mi (9.215 km)
- Existed: 1955–present

Louisiana Highway 751 (LA 751) runs 5.73 miles (9.22 km) in a general north–south direction from LA 35 to LA 752 north of Church Point. The route's mileposts increase from the northern end contrary to common practice.

Parish	Location	mi	km	Destinations	Notes
Acadia–St. Landry parish line		0.000	0.000	LA 35 (Lawtell Highway) – Church Point, Lawtell	Southern terminus
Acadia–St. Landry parish line		4.536	7.300	LA 358 (Brigman Highway)	
St. Landry		5.726	9.215	LA 752	Northern terminus
1.000 mi = 1.609 km; 1.000 km = 0.621 mi

== Louisiana Highway 752 ==
Louisiana Highway 752
- Location: St. Landry Parish
- Length: 5.361 mi (8.628 km)
- Existed: 1955–present

Louisiana Highway 752 (LA 752) runs 5.36 miles (8.63 km) in an east–west direction from US 190 at Swords to LA 35 south of Lawtell.

The entire highway is in St. Landry Parish.

Location	mi	km	Destinations	Notes
Swords	0.000– 0.013	0.000– 0.021	US 190 – Opelousas, Eunice	Western terminus
	1.514	2.437	LA 751	Northern terminus of LA 751
	5.361	8.628	LA 35 – Lawtell, Church Point	Eastern terminus
1.000 mi = 1.609 km; 1.000 km = 0.621 mi

== Louisiana Highway 753 ==
Louisiana Highway 753
- Location: St. Landry Parish
- Length: 1.5 mi (2.4 km)
- Existed: 1955–c. 1957

Louisiana Highway 753 (LA 753) ran 1.5 miles (2.4 km) in an east–west direction from LA 357 to US 167 south of Opelousas.

The entire route was in St. Landry Parish.

mi	km	Destinations	Notes
0.0	0.0	LA 357	Western terminus
1.5	2.4	US 167 – Opelousas, Lafayette	Eastern terminus
1.000 mi = 1.609 km; 1.000 km = 0.621 mi

== Louisiana Highway 754 ==
Louisiana Highway 754
- Location: Church Point–Sunset
- Length: 7.793 mi (12.542 km)
- Existed: 1955–present

Louisiana Highway 754 (LA 754) runs 7.79 miles (12.54 km) in an east–west direction from LA 95 south of Church Point, Acadia Parish to LA 182 west of Sunset, St. Landry Parish.

Parish	Location	mi	km	Destinations	Notes
Acadia		0.000	0.000	LA 95 (Peach Bloom Highway) – Church Point, Mire	Western terminus
Acadia		0.871	1.402	LA 1104 (Old Sunset Road)	Eastern terminus of LA 1104
St. Landry		7.793	12.542	LA 182 – Sunset, Opelousas	Eastern terminus
1.000 mi = 1.609 km; 1.000 km = 0.621 mi

== Louisiana Highway 755 ==
Louisiana Highway 755
- Location: Eunice
- Length: 5.143 mi (8.277 km)
- Existed: 1955–present

Louisiana Highway 755 (LA 755) runs 5.14 miles (8.27 km) in a north–south direction from LA 368 south of Eunice, Acadia Parish to LA 91 within the city limits in St. Landry Parish. The route has a spur that travels 0.94 miles (1.51 km) along College Road from LA 755 to LA 91 in Eunice.

Parish	Location	mi	km	Destinations	Notes
Acadia		0.000	0.000	LA 368 (Rupert Lake Road)	Southern terminus
Acadia	Eunice	4.022	6.473	LA 3123 (Tiger Lane)	Western terminus of LA 3123; to Eunice Airport
St. Landry	Eunice	4.669	7.514	LA 755 Spur (College Road)	Southwestern terminus of LA 755 Spur
St. Landry	Eunice	5.143	8.277	LA 91 (West Maple Street)	Northern terminus
1.000 mi = 1.609 km; 1.000 km = 0.621 mi

== Louisiana Highway 756 ==
Louisiana Highway 756
- Location: Eunice
- Length: 1.6 mi (2.6 km)
- Existed: 1955–c. 1957

Louisiana Highway 756 (LA 756) consisted of three road segments with a total length of 1.6 miles (2.6 km) that were located in the St. Landry Parish city of Eunice.

- LA 756-1 ran 0.7 miles (1.1 km) along West Maple Avenue from LA 91 at South 12th Street to LA 13 at South 2nd Street.
- LA 756-2 ran 0.1 miles (0.16 km) along Camellia Avenue from the junction of LA 13 and LA 29 at North 2nd Street to North 1st Street.
- LA 756-3 ran 0.8 miles (1.3 km) along 1st Street from Maple Avenue to LA 756-2 (Camellia Avenue).

== Louisiana Highway 757 ==
Louisiana Highway 757
- Location: Eunice
- Length: 7.573 mi (12.188 km)
- Existed: 1955–present

Louisiana Highway 757 (LA 757) runs 7.57 miles (12.18 km) in a general east–west direction from LA 3277 northeast of Basile, Evangeline Parish to LA 91 in Eunice, St. Landry Parish.

Parish	Location	mi	km	Destinations	Notes
Evangeline		0.000	0.000	LA 3277 (Old Basile Highway, George Soileau Road) – Basile, Mamou	Western terminus
St. Landry	Eunice	7.060	11.362	US 190 (West Laurel Avenue)	
St. Landry	Eunice	7.573	12.188	LA 91 (West Maple Avenue)	Eastern terminus; to LSU Eunice
1.000 mi = 1.609 km; 1.000 km = 0.621 mi

== Louisiana Highway 758 ==
Louisiana Highway 758
- Location: St. Landry Parish
- Length: 4.642 mi (7.471 km)
- Existed: 1955–present

Louisiana Highway 758 (LA 758) runs 4.64 miles (7.47 km) in a general north–south direction from the junction of US 190/LA 95 and LA 95 Spur east of Eunice, St. Landry Parish to LA 95 south of Chataignier, Evangeline Parish. The route has a spur that travels 0.09 miles (0.14 km) along Woodstone Road from LA 29 to LA 758 southwest of Chataignier.

Parish	Location	mi	km	Destinations	Notes
St. Landry		0.000– 0.012	0.000– 0.019	US 190 / LA 95 – Eunice, Opelousas LA 95 Spur (Tasso Loop)	Southern terminus of LA 758; northern terminus of LA 95 Spur
Evangeline		3.109	5.003	LA 758 Spur (Woodstone Road)	Eastern terminus of LA 758 Spur (signed as LA 758)
Evangeline		4.642	7.471	LA 95 (St. Julien Road, Clinne Road) – Chataignier, Church Point	Northern terminus
1.000 mi = 1.609 km; 1.000 km = 0.621 mi

== Louisiana Highway 759 ==
Louisiana Highway 759
- Location: Lewisburg
- Length: 0.492 mi (792 m)
- Existed: 1955–present

Louisiana Highway 759 (LA 759) runs 0.49 miles (0.79 km) in an east–west direction from a local road to a junction with LA 357 in Lewisburg. The route's mileposts increase from the eastern end contrary to common practice.

The entire highway is in Lewisburg, St. Landry Parish.

mi	km	Destinations	Notes
0.492	0.792	Begin state maintenance at Bourque Road	Western terminus
0.000	0.000	LA 357 – Church Point, Opelousas	Eastern terminus
1.000 mi = 1.609 km; 1.000 km = 0.621 mi

== Louisiana Highway 760 ==
Louisiana Highway 760
- Location: Grand Coteau–Sunset
- Length: 2.038 mi (3.280 km)
- Existed: 1955–present

Louisiana Highway 760 (LA 760) consists of two road segments with a total length of 2.04 miles (3.28 km) that are located in the adjacent St. Landry Parish towns of Grand Coteau and Sunset.

- LA 760-1 runs 1.215 miles (1.955 km) along Church and Academy Streets from LA 93 (East Martin Luther King, Jr. Drive) to a dead end at Schools of the Sacred Heart in Grand Coteau.
- LA 760-2 runs 0.823 miles (1.324 km) along Bellemin Street from LA 182 (Napoleon Avenue) in Sunset to LA 93 (East Martin Luther King, Jr. Drive) in Sunset.

== Louisiana Highway 761 ==
Louisiana Highway 761
- Location: St. Landry Parish
- Length: 2.538 mi (4.085 km)
- Existed: 1955–present

Louisiana Highway 761 (LA 761) runs 2.54 miles (4.09 km) in an east–west direction from LA 365 southwest of Cankton to LA 93 south of Cankton.

Parish	Location	mi	km	Destinations	Notes
Acadia–St. Landry parish line		0.000	0.000	LA 365 (Osage Trail)	Western terminus
St. Landry		1.016	1.635	LA 343 – Bosco, Bristol	
St. Landry		2.538	4.085	LA 93 – Cankton, Scott	Eastern terminus
1.000 mi = 1.609 km; 1.000 km = 0.621 mi

== Louisiana Highway 762 ==
Louisiana Highway 762
- Location: St. Landry Parish
- Length: 1.0 mi (1.6 km)
- Existed: 1955–c. 1957

Louisiana Highway 762 (LA 762) ran 1.0 mile (1.6 km) in an east–west direction from a local road to LA 343 southwest of Cankton.

Parish	Location	mi	km	Destinations	Notes
Acadia–St. Landry parish line		0.0	0.0	Begin state maintenance	Western terminus
Acadia–St. Landry parish line	Bosco	1.0	1.6	LA 343	Eastern terminus
1.000 mi = 1.609 km; 1.000 km = 0.621 mi

== Louisiana Highway 763 ==
Louisiana Highway 763
- Location: Stanley
- Length: 2.348 mi (3.779 km)
- Existed: 1955–present

Louisiana Highway 763 (LA 763) runs 2.35 miles (3.78 km) in a north–south direction from LA 191 south of Stanley to US 84 within the village limits.

The entire highway is in DeSoto Parish.

Location	mi	km	Destinations	Notes
	0.000	0.000	LA 191	Southern terminus
Stanley	2.348	3.779	US 84 – Logansport, Mansfield	Northern terminus
1.000 mi = 1.609 km; 1.000 km = 0.621 mi

== Louisiana Highway 764 ==
Louisiana Highway 764
- Location: Logansport
- Length: 3.669 mi (5.905 km)
- Existed: 1955–present

Louisiana Highway 764 (LA 764) runs 3.67 miles (5.91 km) in a north–south direction along Marshall Road from US 84 in Logansport to a local road north of the town limits.

The entire highway is in DeSoto Parish.

Location	mi	km	Destinations	Notes
Logansport	0.000	0.000	US 84 (Main Street)	Southern terminus
	3.382– 3.429	5.443– 5.518	LA 765 – Carthage, Marshall	Eastern terminus of LA 765
	3.669	5.905	End state maintenance at junction of Marshall Road and State Line Road	Northern terminus
1.000 mi = 1.609 km; 1.000 km = 0.621 mi

== Louisiana Highway 765 ==
Louisiana Highway 765
- Location: DeSoto Parish
- Length: 2.208 mi (3.553 km)
- Existed: 1955–present

Louisiana Highway 765 (LA 765) runs 2.21 miles (3.56 km) in a northwest to southeast direction from the Texas state line to LA 764 north of Logansport.

The entire route is in DeSoto Parish.

mi	km	Destinations	Notes
0.000	0.000	FM 31 – Carthage	Western terminus; continuation in Texas
2.163– 2.208	3.481– 3.553	LA 764 (Marshall Road) – Logansport	Eastern terminus
1.000 mi = 1.609 km; 1.000 km = 0.621 mi

== Louisiana Highway 766 ==
Louisiana Highway 766
- Location: Keachi
- Length: 2.0 mi (3.2 km)
- Existed: 1955–1961

Louisiana Highway 766 (LA 766) ran 2.0 miles (3.2 km) in a southeast to northwest direction along Keachi Road from LA 172 in Keachi to a local road at the Caddo Parish line.

Parish	Location	mi	km	Destinations	Notes
DeSoto	Keachi	0.0	0.0	LA 172	Southern terminus
DeSoto–Caddo parish line		2.0	3.2	End state maintenance on Keachi Road	Northern terminus
1.000 mi = 1.609 km; 1.000 km = 0.621 mi

== Louisiana Highway 767 ==
Louisiana Highway 767
- Location: Mooringsport
- Length: 0.402 mi (647 m)
- Existed: 1955–present

Louisiana Highway 767 (LA 767) runs 0.40 miles (0.64 km) in a general north–south direction from LA 169 to LA 538 in Mooringsport.

The entire highway is in Mooringsport, Caddo Parish.

mi	km	Destinations	Notes
0.000	0.000	LA 169 (Greenwood Street, Jennings Street)	Southern terminus
0.402	0.647	LA 538 (West Croom Street, Latimer Street)	Northern terminus
1.000 mi = 1.609 km; 1.000 km = 0.621 mi

== Louisiana Highway 768 ==
Louisiana Highway 768
- Location: Grant Parish
- Length: 1.5 mi (2.4 km)
- Existed: 1955–1969

Louisiana Highway 768 (LA 768) ran 1.5 miles (2.4 km) in an east–west direction from a local road to a junction with US 165 south of Pollock.

The entire highway was in Grant Parish.

Location	mi	km	Destinations	Notes
Simms	0.0	0.0	Begin state maintenance	Western terminus
	1.5	2.4	US 165 – Alexandria, Monroe	Eastern terminus
1.000 mi = 1.609 km; 1.000 km = 0.621 mi

== Louisiana Highway 769 ==
Louisiana Highway 769
- Location: Myrtis–Mira
- Length: 6.3 mi (10.1 km)
- Existed: 1955–1970

Louisiana Highway 769 (LA 769) ran 6.3 miles (10.1 km) in an east–west direction from LA 1 at Myrtis to US 71 at Mira.

The entire highway was in Caddo Parish.

Location	mi	km	Destinations	Notes
Myrtis	0.0	0.0	LA 1 – Rodessa, Vivian	Western terminus
Mira	6.3	10.1	US 71 – Shreveport, Texarkana	Eastern terminus
1.000 mi = 1.609 km; 1.000 km = 0.621 mi

== Louisiana Highway 770 ==
Louisiana Highway 770
- Location: LaSalle Parish
- Length: 1.892 mi (3.045 km)
- Existed: 1955–present

Louisiana Highway 770 (LA 770) runs 1.89 miles (3.04 km) in a general north–south direction from the junction of two local roads to a junction with LA 127 south of Olla. The route's mileposts increase from the northern end contrary to common practice.

The entire route is in LaSalle Parish.

mi	km	Destinations	Notes
1.892	3.045	Begin state maintenance at junction of Troyville (or Rebel) Road and Industrial Park 30	Southern terminus
0.000	0.000	LA 127 – Olla, Jena	Northern terminus
1.000 mi = 1.609 km; 1.000 km = 0.621 mi

== Louisiana Highway 771 ==
Louisiana Highway 771
- Location: LaSalle Parish
- Length: 4.516 mi (7.268 km)
- Existed: 1955–present

Louisiana Highway 771 (LA 771) runs 4.52 miles (7.27 km) in a general north–south direction from LA 503 to a local road north of Jena.

The entire route is in LaSalle Parish.

mi	km	Destinations	Notes
0.000	0.000	LA 503	Southern terminus
4.516	7.268	End state maintenance	Northern terminus
1.000 mi = 1.609 km; 1.000 km = 0.621 mi

== Louisiana Highway 772 ==
Louisiana Highway 772
- Location: Jena
- Length: 10.623 mi (17.096 km)
- Existed: 1955–present

Louisiana Highway 772 (LA 772) runs 10.62 miles (17.09 km) in a general east–west direction from LA 8 west of Jena to the junction of two local roads east of Jena. Much of the route, including its entirety within the Jena town limits, is concurrent with US 84.

LA 772 heads north from LA 8 to a junction with US 84 in the community of Trout. US 84 and LA 772 travel eastward concurrently through the small community of Midway and into the town of Jena, where the route travels along Oak Street. In the center of Jena, US 84/LA 772 intersects LA 127 (North 1st Street) and begins a concurrency with LA 8. Just beyond LA 459 (Aimwell Road), US 84 and LA 8 curve to the southeast while LA 772 branches due east onto Old Harrisonburg Road. After existing Jena, LA 772 proceeds northeast and follows Hatchery Road into an area known as Routon, where state maintenance ends at an intersection with Pritchard Road. The route continues straight ahead as Routon Road under local control.

The entire highway is in LaSalle Parish.

Location	mi	km	Destinations	Notes
	0.000	0.000	LA 8 – Jena, Pollock	Western terminus
Trout	2.113	3.401	US 84 west (Church Road) – Tullos	West end of US 84 concurrency
Midway	3.615	5.818	LA 778 (West Southern Avenue)	Western terminus of LA 778
Midway	3.636	5.852	LA 3104	Northern terminus of LA 3104
Jena	4.997	8.042	LA 8 west / LA 127 (North 1st Street)	West end of LA 8 concurrency
Jena	5.890	9.479	LA 459 north (Aimwell Road) – Aimwell	Southern terminus of LA 459
Jena	5.993	9.645	US 84 east / LA 8 east (East Oak Street) – Jonesville	East end of US 84 and LA 8 concurrencies
Routon	10.623	17.096	End state maintenance at junction of Routon Road and Pritchard Road	Eastern terminus
1.000 mi = 1.609 km; 1.000 km = 0.621 mi: Concurrency terminus

== Louisiana Highway 773 ==
Louisiana Highway 773
- Location: LaSalle Parish
- Length: 3.117 mi (5.016 km)
- Existed: 1955–present

Louisiana Highway 773 (LA 773) runs 3.12 miles (5.02 km) in a north–south direction from a local road to a junction with LA 8 southwest of Jena. The route's mileposts increase from the northern end contrary to common practice.

The entire route is in LaSalle Parish.

mi	km	Destinations	Notes
3.117	5.016	Begin state maintenance on Alonzo Road	Southern terminus
2.916	4.693	LA 774	Eastern terminus of LA 774
0.000	0.000	LA 8 – Jena, Pollock	Northern terminus
1.000 mi = 1.609 km; 1.000 km = 0.621 mi

== Louisiana Highway 774 ==
Louisiana Highway 774
- Location: LaSalle Parish
- Length: 1.844 mi (2.968 km)
- Existed: 1955–present

Louisiana Highway 774 (LA 774) runs 1.84 miles (2.96 km) in a northwest to southeast direction from LA 8 to LA 773 southwest of Jena.

The entire highway is in LaSalle Parish.

Location	mi	km	Destinations	Notes
Eden	0.000	0.000	LA 8 – Jena, Pollock	Western terminus
	1.844	2.968	LA 773	Eastern terminus
1.000 mi = 1.609 km; 1.000 km = 0.621 mi

== Louisiana Highway 775 ==
Louisiana Highway 775
- Location: LaSalle Parish
- Length: 2.3 mi (3.7 km)
- Existed: 1955–1973

Louisiana Highway 775 (LA 775) ran 2.3 miles (3.7 km) in an east–west direction from LA 774 to LA 773 southwest of Jena.

The entire route was in LaSalle Parish.

mi	km	Destinations	Notes
0.0	0.0	LA 774	Western terminus
2.3	3.7	LA 773	Eastern terminus
1.000 mi = 1.609 km; 1.000 km = 0.621 mi

== Louisiana Highway 776 ==
Louisiana Highway 776
- Location: LaSalle Parish
- Length: 3.834 mi (6.170 km)
- Existed: 1955–present

Louisiana Highway 776 (LA 776) runs 3.83 miles (6.16 km) in a north–south direction from the junction of two local roads to a junction with LA 127 east of Catahoula Lake.

The entire route is in LaSalle Parish.

mi	km	Destinations	Notes
0.000	0.000	Begin state maintenance at junction of Rock Bar Road and Russell's Landing Road	Southern terminus
3.834	6.170	LA 127 – Jena	Northern terminus
1.000 mi = 1.609 km; 1.000 km = 0.621 mi

== Louisiana Highway 777 ==
Louisiana Highway 777
- Location: LaSalle Parish
- Length: 1.022 mi (1.645 km)
- Existed: 1955–present

Louisiana Highway 777 (LA 777) runs 1.02 miles (1.64 km) in a north–south direction from LA 127 to a local road south of Jena. The route's mileposts increase from the northern end contrary to common practice.

The entire route is in LaSalle Parish.

mi	km	Destinations	Notes
1.022	1.645	Begin state maintenance on Indian Bluff Road	Southern terminus
0.000	0.000	LA 127 – Jena	Northern terminus
1.000 mi = 1.609 km; 1.000 km = 0.621 mi

== Louisiana Highway 778 ==
Louisiana Highway 778
- Location: Jena
- Length: 3.167 mi (5.097 km)
- Existed: 1955–present

Louisiana Highway 778 (LA 778) runs 3.17 miles (5.10 km) in a general east–west direction from US 84 in Midway to LA 127 in Jena.

The entire highway is in LaSalle Parish.

Location	mi	km	Destinations	Notes
Midway	0.000	0.000	US 84 – Jena, Tullos	Western terminus
Jena	1.372	2.208	LA 127 (North 1st Street)	
Jena	3.167	5.097	LA 127 (North 1st Street)	Eastern terminus
1.000 mi = 1.609 km; 1.000 km = 0.621 mi

== Louisiana Highway 779 ==
Louisiana Highway 779
- Location: LaSalle Parish
- Length: 1.1 mi (1.8 km)
- Existed: 1955–c. 1957

Louisiana Highway 779 (LA 779) ran 1.1 miles (1.8 km) in a north–south direction from a dead end to a junction with US 165 east of Tullos.

The entire route was in LaSalle Parish.

mi	km	Destinations	Notes
0.0	0.0	Dead end at New Union Church	Southern terminus
1.1	1.8	US 165 – Tullos, Olla	Northern terminus
1.000 mi = 1.609 km; 1.000 km = 0.621 mi

== Louisiana Highway 780 ==
Louisiana Highway 780
- Location: Caddo Parish
- Length: 4.9 mi (7.9 km)
- Existed: 1955–c. 1957

Louisiana Highway 780 (LA 780) ran 4.9 miles (7.9 km) in a general east–west direction from LA 168 west of Ida to US 71 south of Ida.

The entire route was in Caddo Parish.

mi	km	Destinations	Notes
0.0	0.0	LA 168 – Ida, Rodessa	Western terminus
4.9	7.9	US 71 – Texarkana, Shreveport	Eastern terminus
1.000 mi = 1.609 km; 1.000 km = 0.621 mi

== Louisiana Highway 781 ==
Louisiana Highway 781
- Location: St. Landry Parish
- Length: 0.9 mi (1,400 m)
- Existed: 1955–c. 1957

Louisiana Highway 781 (LA 781) ran 0.9 miles (1.4 km) in a north–south direction from US 190 to LA 104 west of Opelousas.

The entire route was in St. Landry Parish.

mi	km	Destinations	Notes
0.0	0.0	US 190 – Opelousas, Eunice	Southern terminus
0.9	1.4	LA 104 – Opelousas, Prairie Ronde	Northern terminus
1.000 mi = 1.609 km; 1.000 km = 0.621 mi

== Louisiana Highway 782 ==
Louisiana Highway 782
- Location: Bossier City
- Length: 1.539 mi (2.477 km)
- Existed: 1955–present

Louisiana Highway 782 (LA 782) consists of one road segment with a total length of 1.54 miles (2.48 km) that is located in the Bossier Parish city of Bossier City. Two of the original three segments have been deleted since the 1955 Louisiana Highway renumbering.

- LA 782-1 ran 0.8 miles (1.3 km) along Patricia Drive from Waller Avenue to LA 185 (Northgate Road). The route was deleted in 2000.
- LA 782-2 runs 1.54 miles (2.48 km) along Industrial Drive from LA 72 (Old Minden Road) to the concurrent US 79/US 80 (East Texas Street).
- LA 782-3 ran 0.4 miles (0.64 km) along Traffic Street from US 71 (Barksdale Boulevard) to the concurrent US 79/US 80 (East Texas Street). The route was deleted in 1967.

== Louisiana Highway 783 ==
Louisiana Highway 783
- Location: Coushatta–Woodardville
- Length: 16.756 mi (26.966 km)
- Existed: 1955–present

Louisiana Highway 783 (LA 783) runs 16.76 miles (26.97 km) in a north–south direction from US 71 north of Coushatta, Red River Parish to US 371 south of Ringgold, Bienville Parish.

Parish	Location	mi	km	Destinations	Notes
Red River		0.000	0.000	US 71 – Coushatta, Bossier City	Southern terminus
Red River		9.549	15.368	LA 514 – Hall Summit, Cross Roads	
Bienville	Woodardville	16.756	26.966	US 371 – Ringgold, Coushatta	Northern terminus
1.000 mi = 1.609 km; 1.000 km = 0.621 mi

== Louisiana Highway 784 ==
Louisiana Highway 784
- Location: Red River Parish
- Length: 6.353 mi (10.224 km)
- Existed: 1955–present

Louisiana Highway 784 (LA 784) runs 6.35 miles (10.22 km) in an east–west direction from the concurrent US 71/US 84 east of Coushatta to LA 507 south of Martin.

The entire route is in Red River Parish.

mi	km	Destinations	Notes
0.000	0.000	US 71 / US 84 – Coushatta, Campti	Western terminus
1.694– 1.785	2.726– 2.873	Bridge over Grand Bayou Reservoir	
6.353	10.224	LA 507 – Martin, Fairview Alpha	Eastern terminus
1.000 mi = 1.609 km; 1.000 km = 0.621 mi

== Louisiana Highway 785 ==
Louisiana Highway 785
- Location: Caddo Parish
- Length: 3.8 mi (6.1 km)
- Existed: 1955–c. 1957

Louisiana Highway 785 (LA 785) ran 3.8 miles (6.1 km) in a north–south direction from LA 538 northwest of Blanchard to a dead end east of Mooringsport.

The entire route was in Caddo Parish.

mi	km	Destinations	Notes
0.0	0.0	LA 538 – Mooringsport, Shreveport	Southern terminus
2.5	4.0	LA 1 – Oil City, Shreveport	
3.8	6.1	Dead end between Fish Lake and Egan Lake	Northern terminus
1.000 mi = 1.609 km; 1.000 km = 0.621 mi

== Louisiana Highway 786 ==
Louisiana Highway 786
- Location: Martin
- Length: 5.125 mi (8.248 km)
- Existed: 1955–present

Louisiana Highway 786 (LA 786) runs 5.13 miles (8.26 km) in an east–west direction from US 371 west of Martin to LA 507 within the village limits.

The entire highway is in Red River Parish.

Location	mi	km	Destinations	Notes
	0.000	0.000	US 371 – Coushatta, Ringgold	Western terminus
Martin	5.125	8.248	LA 507 – Martin, Womack	Eastern terminus
1.000 mi = 1.609 km; 1.000 km = 0.621 mi

== Louisiana Highway 787 ==
Louisiana Highway 787
- Location: Martin
- Length: 3.542 mi (5.700 km)
- Existed: 1955–present

Louisiana Highway 787 (LA 787) runs 3.54 miles (5.70 km) in a north–south direction from LA 507 south of Martin to LA 155 within the village limits.

The entire highway is in Red River Parish.

Location	mi	km	Destinations	Notes
	0.000	0.000	LA 507 – Martin, Fairview Alpha	Southern terminus
Martin	3.542	5.700	LA 155 – Martin, Ashland	Northern terminus
1.000 mi = 1.609 km; 1.000 km = 0.621 mi

== Louisiana Highway 788 ==
Louisiana Highway 788
- Location: Hall Summit
- Length: 2.280 mi (3.669 km)
- Existed: 1955–present

Louisiana Highway 788 (LA 788) runs 2.28 miles (3.67 km) in a northwest to southeast direction from LA 514 in Hall Summit to US 371 southeast of the village limits.

The entire highway is in Red River Parish.

Location	mi	km	Destinations	Notes
Hall Summit	0.000	0.000	LA 514 (Duke Avenue)	Western terminus
	2.280	3.669	US 371 – Ringgold, Coushatta	Eastern terminus
1.000 mi = 1.609 km; 1.000 km = 0.621 mi

== Louisiana Highway 789 ==
Louisiana Highway 789
- Location: Keachi–Spring Ridge
- Length: 8.687 mi (13.980 km)
- Existed: 1955–present

Louisiana Highway 789 (LA 789) runs 8.69 miles (13.99 km) in a north–south direction from the junction of LA 5 and LA 172 in Keachi, DeSoto Parish to a junction with LA 169 south of Spring Ridge, Caddo Parish.

Parish	Location	mi	km	Destinations	Notes
DeSoto	Keachi	0.000	0.000	LA 5 – Logansport, Shreveport LA 172 west – Carthage	Southern terminus
Caddo		8.687	13.980	LA 169 (Four Forks Road, Greenwood-Spring Ridge Road) – Spring Ridge, Greenwood	Northern terminus
1.000 mi = 1.609 km; 1.000 km = 0.621 mi

== Louisiana Highway 790 ==
Louisiana Highway 790
- Location: Bienville Parish
- Length: 3.808 mi (6.128 km)
- Existed: 1955–present

Louisiana Highway 790 (LA 790) runs 3.81 miles (6.13 km) in an east–west direction from LA 4 to US 371 south of Ringgold.

The entire highway is in Bienville Parish.

Location	mi	km	Destinations	Notes
	0.000	0.000	LA 4 – Ringgold, Loggy Bayou	Western terminus
Tullis	3.808	6.128	US 371 – Ringgold, Coushatta	Eastern terminus
1.000 mi = 1.609 km; 1.000 km = 0.621 mi

== Louisiana Highway 791 ==
Louisiana Highway 791
- Location: Bienville Parish
- Length: 4.5 mi (7.2 km)
- Existed: 1955–c. 1957

Louisiana Highway 791 (LA 791) ran 4.5 miles (7.2 km) in a northwest to southeast direction from the Webster Parish line to a junction with LA 7 north of Ringgold.

Parish	Location	mi	km	Destinations	Notes
Webster–Bienville parish line		0.0	0.0	Begin state maintenance	Western terminus
Bienville		4.5	7.2	LA 7 – Ringgold, Minden	Eastern terminus
1.000 mi = 1.609 km; 1.000 km = 0.621 mi

== Louisiana Highway 792 ==
Louisiana Highway 792
- Location: Castor–Heflin
- Length: 15.852 mi (25.511 km)
- Existed: 1955–present

Louisiana Highway 792 (LA 792) runs 15.85 miles (25.51 km) in a north–south direction from LA 4 in Castor, Bienville Parish to LA 531 in Heflin, Webster Parish.

Parish	Location	mi	km	Destinations	Notes
Bienville	Castor	0.000	0.000	LA 4 – Castor, Ringgold	Southern terminus
Bienville	Jamestown	6.730	10.831	LA 154 – Ringgold, Bienville	
Bienville	Fryeburg	11.995	19.304	LA 516	
Webster	Heflin	15.852	25.511	LA 531 – Dubberly, Minden	Northern terminus
1.000 mi = 1.609 km; 1.000 km = 0.621 mi

== Louisiana Highway 793 ==
Louisiana Highway 793
- Location: Bienville Parish
- Length: 5.247 mi (8.444 km)
- Existed: 1955–present

Louisiana Highway 793 (LA 793) runs 5.25 miles (8.45 km) in an east–west direction from a local road to a junction with LA 154 southeast of Mount Lebanon.

Parish	Location	mi	km	Destinations	Notes
Webster		0.000	0.000	Begin state maintenance on Black Lake Bottom Road	Western terminus
Bienville		2.656	4.274	LA 794 north	Southern terminus of LA 794
Bienville		3.456	5.562	LA 795 north	Southern terminus of LA 795
Bienville	Pleasant Hill	5.247	8.444	LA 154 – Gibsland, Ringgold	Eastern terminus
1.000 mi = 1.609 km; 1.000 km = 0.621 mi

== Louisiana Highway 794 ==
Louisiana Highway 794
- Location: Gibsland
- Length: 7.218 mi (11.616 km)
- Existed: 1955–present

Louisiana Highway 794 (LA 794) runs 7.22 miles (11.62 km) in a southwest to northeast direction from LA 793 southwest of Mount Lebanon to LA 154 in Gibsland.

The entire highway is in Bienville Parish.

Location	mi	km	Destinations	Notes
	0.000	0.000	LA 793	Southern terminus
Gibsland	7.218	11.616	LA 154 (Main Street)	Northern terminus
1.000 mi = 1.609 km; 1.000 km = 0.621 mi

== Louisiana Highway 795 ==
Louisiana Highway 795
- Location: Mount Lebanon
- Length: 4.492 mi (7.229 km)
- Existed: 1955–present

Louisiana Highway 795 (LA 795) runs 4.49 miles (7.23 km) in a southwest to northeast direction from LA 793 southwest of Mount Lebanon to LA 154 north of the town limits.

The entire route is in Bienville Parish.

mi	km	Destinations	Notes
0.000	0.000	LA 793	Southern terminus
4.492	7.229	LA 154 – Gibsland, Ringgold	Northern terminus; 0.03 miles (0.048 km) north of Mount Lebanon
1.000 mi = 1.609 km; 1.000 km = 0.621 mi

== Louisiana Highway 796 ==
Louisiana Highway 796
- Location: Bienville Parish
- Length: 2.897 mi (4.662 km)
- Existed: 1955–present

Louisiana Highway 796 (LA 796) runs 2.90 miles (4.67 km) in an east–west direction from LA 508 to LA 155 east of Bienville.

The entire highway is in Bienville Parish.

Location	mi	km	Destinations	Notes
Liberty Hill	0.000	0.000	LA 508 – Bienville	Western terminus
	2.863– 2.897	4.608– 4.662	LA 155 – Mt. Olive, Friendship	Eastern terminus
1.000 mi = 1.609 km; 1.000 km = 0.621 mi

== Louisiana Highway 797 ==
Louisiana Highway 797
- Location: Bienville Parish
- Length: 3.792 mi (6.103 km)
- Existed: 1955–present

Louisiana Highway 797 (LA 797) runs 3.79 miles (6.10 km) in a north–south direction from LA 507 northeast of Bienville to LA 147 east of Bryceland.

Parish	Location	mi	km	Destinations	Notes
Bienville		0.000	0.000	LA 507 – Bienville, Simsboro	Southern terminus
Lincoln		3.792	6.103	LA 147 – Arcadia, Jonesboro	Northern terminus
1.000 mi = 1.609 km; 1.000 km = 0.621 mi

== Louisiana Highway 798 ==
Louisiana Highway 798
- Location: Arcadia
- Length: 2.339 mi (3.764 km)
- Existed: 1955–present

Louisiana Highway 798 (LA 798) consists of three road segments with a total length of 2.34 miles (3.77 km) that are located in the Bienville Parish town of Arcadia.

- LA 798-1 runs 0.230 miles (0.370 km) along Second Street from the junction of US 80/LA 9 and LA 519 at Beech Street to LA 151 (North Hazel Street). The route is co-signed as US 80 Truck.
- LA 798-2 runs 1.651 miles (2.657 km) along Sixth Street from LA 9 to LA 151 (North Hazel Street).
- LA 798-3 runs 0.458 miles (0.737 km) primarily along Locust Street off of LA 9 (South Hazel Street). The route also makes a loop around a block of public buildings, traveling along Maple, Chestnut, and Beech Streets.

== Louisiana Highway 799 ==
Louisiana Highway 799
- Location: Gibsland
- Length: 0.158 mi (254 m)
- Existed: 1955–present

Louisiana Highway 799 (LA 799) runs 0.16 miles (0.26 km) in a southeast to northwest direction from the junction of US 80 and LA 154 to a second junction with US 80 in Gibsland. The route is co-signed as US 80 Truck.

The entire highway is in Gibsland, Bienville Parish.

mi	km	Destinations	Notes
0.000	0.000	US 80 west / LA 154 (South Main Street) to I-20 – Bryceland, Minden US 80 east (South 3rd Street) – Arcadia US 80 Truck begins	Southern terminus; south end of US 80 Truck concurrency
0.158	0.254	US 80 (South 1st Street) US 80 Truck ends	Northern terminus; north end of US 80 Truck concurrency
1.000 mi = 1.609 km; 1.000 km = 0.621 mi: Concurrency terminus

The route originally consisted of two distinct road segments, but these were combined into a shorter linear route soon after the 1955 Louisiana Highway renumbering:

- LA 799-1 ran 0.6 miles (0.97 km) along Gibbs Street from LA 794 (Oak Grove Road) to US 80 (South First Street).
- LA 799-2 ran 0.1 miles (0.16 km) along South Third Street from LA 799-1 (Gibbs Street) to the junction of US 80 and LA 154 at South Main Street.
