= Louisiana Highway 93 =

Highway in Louisiana

Louisiana Highway 93
- LA 93 in red and LA 93-1 in blue

Route information
- Maintained by Louisiana DOTD
- Length: 23.427 mi (37.702 km)
- Existed: 1955 renumbering–present
- Tourist routes: Louisiana Scenic Byway: Zydeco Cajun Prairie Byway

Major junctions
- South end: US 90 in Scott
- I-10 in Scott; I-49 / US 167 in Grand Coteau
- North end: LA 31 in Arnaudville

Location
- Country: United States
- State: Louisiana
- Parishes: Lafayette, St. Landry, St. Martin

Highway system
- Louisiana State Highway System; Interstate; US; State; Scenic
← LA 92	→ LA 94

Louisiana Highway 93 (LA 93) is a state highway located in southern Louisiana. It runs 23.427 miles (37.702 km) in a southwest to northeast direction from US 90 in Scott to LA 31 in Arnaudville.

The majority of the route travels north–south, connecting the small city of Scott with the twin towns of Sunset and Grand Coteau. It then follows an east–west path between Grand Coteau and Arnaudville, located on Bayou Teche. The north–south directional banners are generally absent from the highway's signage over this latter portion. Over the course of its route, LA 93 crosses two Interstate Highways and two U.S. Highways: I-10 and US 90 in Scott and the concurrent I-49/US 167 in Grand Coteau.

LA 93 was designated in the 1955 Louisiana Highway renumbering, replacing three shorter former routes: State Route 538, State Route 161, and State Route 245. Prior to 2015, LA 93 was slightly longer on its southern end, as it once followed Ridge Road east of LA 342 to a junction with US 167. This portion of the route was returned to local control as part of the state highway department's recently adopted Road Transfer program. In the future, the entire route south of Scott is planned to be deleted from the state highway system. Part of this was realized in 2021, when most of LA 93 between US 90 in Scott and LA 342 in Lafayette, was transferred to local jurisdictions, truncating the highway to its southern current terminus. The remaining state-owned section, which extends 1.819 miles (2.927 km) north of LA 342, was redesignated as LA 93-1.

== Route description ==
=== Scott to Sunset ===
LA 93 begins at the intersection of US 90 and Apollo Road in Scott, on the northwest side of town. LA 93 heads north, through a roundabout onto St. Mary Street, and immediately enters a diamond interchange with I-10 at exit 97. I-10 parallels the route of US 90 through the region, connection with Lafayette to the east and Lake Charles to the west.

North of Scott, LA 93 enters more rural surroundings as it passes through areas known as Ossun and Vatican. Between the two communities is a junction with LA 98 (West Gloria Switch Road), which leads eastward into Carencro. Just north of Vatican, LA 93 crosses from Lafayette Parish into St. Landry Parish. Shortly afterward, the highway passes through the village of Cankton, where it is known locally as Main Street.

=== Sunset to Arnaudville ===
Just north of Cankton, LA 93 curves to the northeast at a junction with LA 356 and proceeds into the town of Sunset, gaining the local name of Sunset Strip. The route turns east briefly onto Napoleon Avenue and runs concurrent with LA 182. Within a short distance, LA 93 turns northeast again onto Duffy Avenue, an undivided four-lane highway with a center turning lane. It then crosses into the adjacent town of Grand Coteau and passes through a diamond interchange with the concurrent I-49/US 167 at exit 11. The interstate provides another connection to Lafayette as well as the city of Opelousas. Now traveling along Martin Luther King Drive, LA 93 returns to two-lane capacity and makes a sharp turn to the southeast through Grand Coteau.

Heading eastward from the small town, LA 93 crosses Bayou Fusilier into St. Martin Parish. The highway then parallels the bayou (and the parish line) for about three miles (4.8 km) before reaching its terminus at a T-intersection with LA 31 in Arnaudville. From this junction, LA 31 heads north on Faculty Street into the town and south on Neblet Street along Bayou Teche toward Breaux Bridge.

=== Route classification and data ===
LA 93 is classified by the Louisiana Department of Transportation and Development (La DOTD) as an urban minor arterial from the southern terminus to LA 98 and as a rural major collector for the remainder of the route. Daily traffic volume in 2013 peaked at 15,800 vehicles in Scott and 11,300 in Sunset with most of the route averaging less than 5,000 vehicles. The posted speed limit is 55 mph (90 km/h) in rural areas but is reduced as low as 30 or 35 mph (50 or 55 km/h) through town.

The portion of LA 93 between Grand Coteau and Arnaudville is part of the Zydeco Cajun Prairie Byway in the state-designated system of tourist routes known as the Louisiana Scenic Byways.

== History ==
In the original Louisiana Highway system in use between 1921 and 1955, LA 93 was part of three shorter routes: State Route 538 from the southern terminus to Scott; State Route 161 to Sunset; and State Route 245 to Arnaudville. All three routes originated from various acts of the Louisiana Legislature between 1926 and 1930. These highway segments were joined under the single designation of LA 93 when the Louisiana Department of Highways renumbered the state highway system in 1955.

La 93—From a junction with La-US 167 southwest of Lafayette through or near Scott, Vatican, Sunset and Grand Coteau to a junction with La 31 at or near Arnaudville.

— 1955 legislative route description

As the above description indicates, the southern terminus of LA 93 was originally a junction with US 167 southwest of Lafayette. It was located at the modern intersection of Johnston Street and Ridge Road, which is now within the Lafayette city limits. The portion of Ridge Road between US 167 and LA 342 had been a small part of State Route 176 prior to the 1955 renumbering. It became part of LA 93 until being transferred to local control in 2015 as part of La DOTD's Road Transfer program. As of 2018, the portion of LA 93 from US 90 to Dulles Drive is under agreement to be removed from the state highway system and transferred to local control. In the future, the remainder of LA 93 between the roundabout and US 90 in Scott is to be similarly removed from the state highway system. The current southern terminus is located at a roundabout that was constructed in 2003, replacing a standard four-way intersection. It is believed to be the first modern roundabout built in the state of Louisiana and has since been followed by several more within Lafayette Parish.

Since the 1955 renumbering, most changes to LA 93 have involved the smoothing of various zigzags along the route, a typical feature of the rural farm roads the highway was originally aligned with. Several right-angle turns were eliminated between Scott and Cankton prior to 1958. At the same time, a short section of highway was constructed in Sunset, reducing the number of right-angle turns heading into town from five to one. The original alignment followed Churchill Street, MacArthur Drive, Anna Street, and Landry Street to Napoleon Avenue.

The most significant realignment occurred in Scott, where LA 93 was moved from its original path along St. Mary Street onto Apollo Road. This road had been constructed in 1981 as a truck route officially designated as LA 3168 and co-signed as LA 93 Truck. Sometime afterward, St. Mary Street was transferred to local control, and the signage for LA 93 was removed from the route. However, Apollo Road continued to be signed as LA 93 Truck and LA 3168 until new signage identifying the route solely as mainline LA 93 was installed in 2013 in connection with another roundabout project at the junction of Apollo Road and St. Mary Street. In 2021, most of LA 93 south of US 90 was retired from the state highway system, with the small remainder becoming auxiliary route LA 93-1.

== Future ==
La DOTD is currently engaged in a program that aims to transfer about 5,000 miles (8,000 km) of state-owned roadways to local governments over the next several years. Under this plan of "right-sizing" the state highway system, the portion of LA 93 south of US 90 in Scott was deleted as it no longer met a significant interurban travel function.

== Major intersections ==
Parish	Location	mi	km	Destinations	Notes
Lafayette	Scott	0.000	0.000	US 90 west (Cameron Street) – Duson	Southern terminus
Lafayette	Scott	0.749– 1.125	1.205– 1.811	I-10 – Lafayette, Lake Charles	Exit 97 on I-10
Lafayette	Ossun	2.998	4.825	LA 723 (Wyman Road)	
Lafayette		4.597	7.398	LA 98 (West Gloria Switch Road) – Carencro, Rayne	Roundabout
St. Landry		6.663	10.723	LA 761	Eastern terminus of LA 761; 0.3 miles (0.48 km) south of Cankton
St. Landry		10.177	16.378	LA 356 – Bristol, Bosco	Eastern terminus of LA 356
St. Landry	Sunset	13.975	22.491	LA 182 north (Napoleon Avenue)	Southern end of LA 182 concurrency
St. Landry	Sunset	14.145	22.764	LA 178 (Pershing Highway)	Eastern terminus of LA 178
St. Landry	Sunset	14.675	23.617	LA 182 south (Napoleon Avenue)	Northern end of LA 182 concurrency
St. Landry	Grand Coteau	15.181– 15.370	24.431– 24.736	I-49 / US 167 – Opelousas, Lafayette	Exit 11 on I-49/US 167
St. Landry	Grand Coteau	15.912	25.608	LA 760-1 (Church Street)	Southern terminus of LA 760-1
St. Landry	Grand Coteau	16.477	26.517	LA 760-2 (Bellemin Street)	Northern terminus of LA 760-2
St. Martin	Arnaudville	23.427	37.702	LA 31 (Neblet Street, Faculty Street) – Breaux Bridge, Krotz Springs	Northern terminus
1.000 mi = 1.609 km; 1.000 km = 0.621 mi: Concurrency terminus

== Auxiliary route ==
Louisiana Highway 93-1
- Location: Lafayette–Scott
- Length: 1.819 mi (2.927 km)
- Existed: 2021–present

Louisiana Highway 93-1 (LA 93-1) is a 1.819-mile (2.927 km) long auxiliary route of LA 93. When most of LA 93 between LA 342 in Lafayette and US 90 in Scott was decommissioned and transferred to local jurisdiction in 2021, the remaining state-owned highway became LA 93-1. The entire route runs in a north–south direction along Rue de Belier, from a roundabout with the eastern terminus of LA 342 (Ridge Road), to a point immediately south of Dulles Drive in Scott. This was done under the La DOTD's Road Transfer Program to streamline the state highway system by retiring and transferring various non-essential state highways to local jurisdictions. The entirety of LA 93-1 is slated to be retired to local authority in the future, with the northern section undergoing a transition as of 2022.

Major intersections

The entire route is in Lafayette Parish.

Location	mi	km	Destinations	Notes
Lafayette	0.000– 0.049	0.000– 0.079	LA 342 west (Ridge Road)	Southern terminus of LA 93-1; eastern terminus of LA 342; roundabout
Scott	1.819	2.927	Rue de Belier to US 90	Northern terminus; road continues as Rue de Belier; former LA 93 north
1.000 mi = 1.609 km; 1.000 km = 0.621 mi
