= Lafayette Parish Correctional Center =

Parish jail in Louisiana, United States

Lafayette Parish Correctional Center (LPCC)
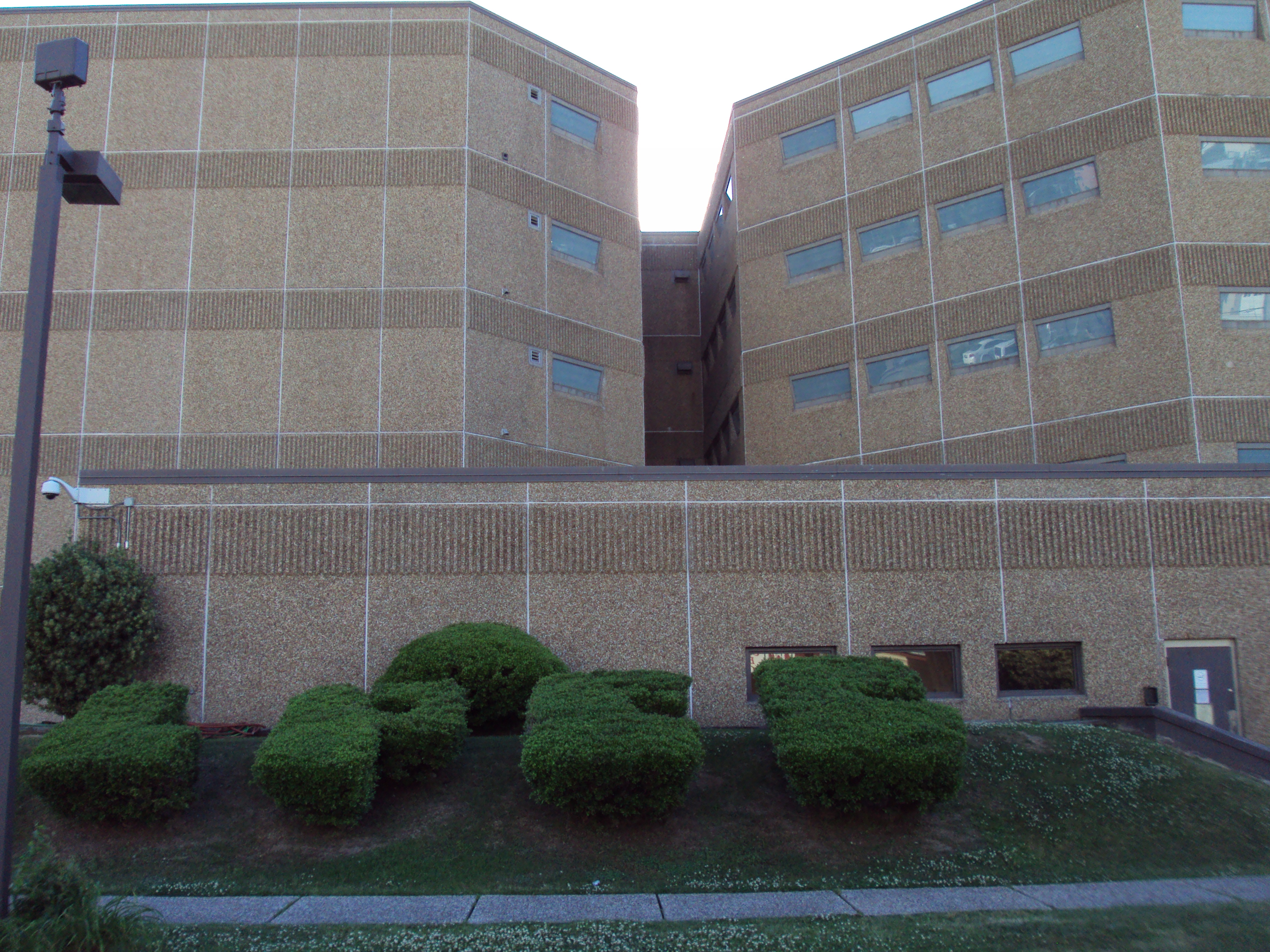
- LPCC
- Interactive map of Lafayette Parish Correctional Center (LPCC)
- Location: Lafayette, Louisiana; 30.223333°N 92.021389°W
- Status: Operational
- Managed by: Lafayette Parish Sheriff's Office

The Lafayette Parish Correctional Center (LPCC) is the parish jail for Lafayette Parish located in downtown Lafayette in the US state of Louisiana. It is run by the Lafayette Parish Sheriff's Office, led by Sheriff Mark Garber. The jail serves the cities of Lafayette, Scott, Carencro, Broussard, Youngsville and the town of Duson, and the unincorporated areas of Lafayette Parish.

The LPCC is operated under the Corrections Division of the LPSO. The jail holds all male and female parish inmates, both sentenced and awaiting trial, as well as a population of Louisiana Department of Corrections (DoC) inmates. The jail operates many work programs for its inmates. These include a work release program, a kitchen crew, laundry crew, general work crew and several road crews. These road crews contribute to the beauty of Lafayette Parish by routinely picking up litter around the parish. LPCC also provides GED services, job-seeking education, counseling services, religious services, recreation, social visiting, commissary, library, and mail distribution to the inmates housed there. LPCC is accredited by the American Correctional Association.

The Corrections Division also operates LAPCORR Industries (Lafayette Parish Correctional Industries), a program where inmates work in a factory like setting making plastic liners and cardboard boxes for government and non-profit customers. This program promotes successful re-integration of inmates into the community by training inmates in quality, safety, productivity, and good work ethics. The revenue made by LAPCORR helps offset the costs of incarceration, reducing the costs to taxpayers. LAPCORR also recycles old inmate uniforms and makes pet beds out of them, donating them to government and non-profit groups.
