= Pont Des Mouton, Louisiana =

Unincorporated community in Louisiana, U.S.

Coordinates: 30°16′20″N 91°59′00″W

Pont Des Mouton (bridge of the Moutons) is an unincorporated community in Lafayette Parish, Louisiana, United States.

The community, bridge, and access road are named after Jean and Marin Mouton, two local landowners who settled the area during the 1770s. The community is located near the intersection of East Pont Des Mouton Road and Louisiana Avenue near I-10. The road leads to Mouton.
