= LPCC =

LPCC can refer to:

== Computing ==
- Low-priority congestion control, such as Low Extra Delay Background Transport (LEDBAT).

== Medicine ==
- Lafayette Parish Correctional Center
- Licensed Professional Clinical Counselor

== Others ==
- Lakshadweep Pradesh Congress Committee or Lakshadweep Territorial Congress Committee (LTCC), branch of the Indian National Congress in Lakshadweep
