= Lafayette Parish, Louisiana =

Parish in Louisiana, United States

Lafayette Parish
- Consolidated city-parish
- Parish of Lafayette; Paroisse de Lafayette (French)
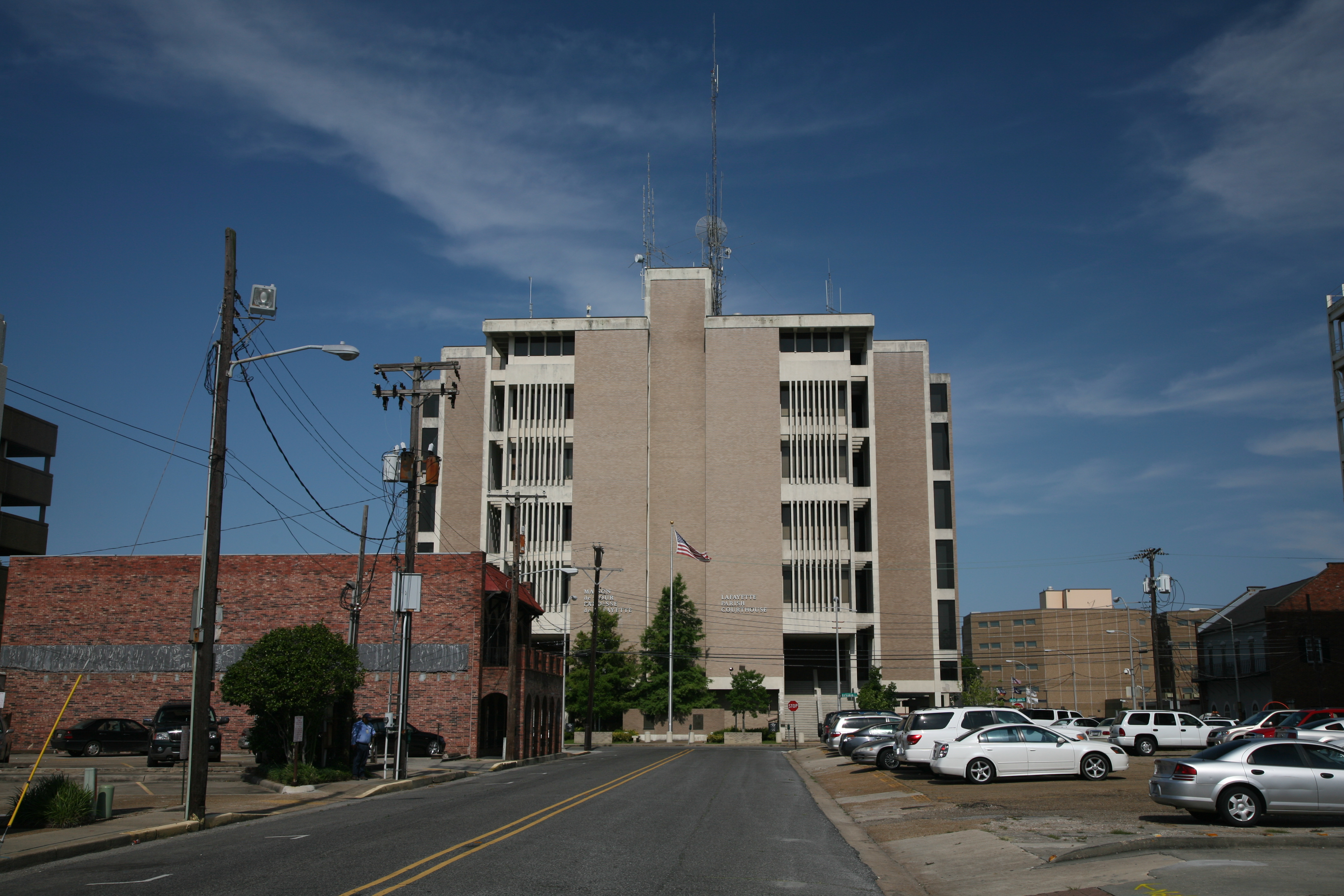
- Lafayette Parish Courthouse

- Location within the U.S. state of Louisiana
- Coordinates: 30°13′N 92°04′W
- Country: United States
- State: Louisiana
- Founded: January 17, 1823
- Named for: Marquis de la Fayette
- Seat: Lafayette
- Largest city: Lafayette

Government
  - President: Monique Blanco Boulet (R)

Area
  - Total: 269 sq mi (700 km^{2})
  - Land: 269 sq mi (700 km^{2})
  - Water: 0.5 sq mi (1.3 km^{2}) 0.2%

Population (2020)
  - Total: 241,753
  - Estimate (2025): 257,949 ▲
  - Density: 899/sq mi (347/km^{2})
- Time zone: UTC−6 (Central)
  - Summer (DST): UTC−5 (CDT)
- Congressional districts: 3rd, 6th
- Website: www.lafayettetravel.com

Lafayette Parish (French: Paroisse de Lafayette) is a parish located in the U.S. state of Louisiana. According to the 2020 U.S. census, the parish had a population of 241,753, up from 221,578 at the 2010 United States census. The parish seat and largest city is Lafayette. The parish was founded in 1823. Lafayette Parish is part of the Acadiana region, which boasts high numbers of French Speakers who keep the Acadian culture alive in Louisiana to this day. Since 1996, the city and parish have operated as a consolidated government.

== Etymology ==
The city and parish of Lafayette were named in honor of the Marquis de Lafayette, the French general who took part in the Continental Army in the American Revolutionary War and financially aided it.

== Geography ==
Lafayette Parish is a part of the region of Acadiana in southern Louisiana, along the Gulf Coast. According to the U.S. Census Bureau, the parish has a total area of 269 square miles (700 km^{2}), of which 269 square miles (700 km^{2}) is land and 0.5 square miles (1.3 km^{2}) (0.2%) is water. It is the fifth-smallest parish in Louisiana by land area and third-smallest by total area.

=== Major highways ===
- Interstate 10
- Interstate 49
- U.S. Highway 90
- U.S. Highway 167
- Louisiana Highway 35
- Louisiana Highway 89
- Louisiana Highway 89-1
- Louisiana Highway 92
- Louisiana Highway 92-1
- Louisiana Highway 93
- Louisiana Highway 93-1
- Louisiana Highway 94
- Louisiana Highway 95
- Louisiana Highway 96
- Louisiana Highway 98
- Louisiana Highway 176
- Louisiana Highway 182
- Louisiana Highway 339
- Louisiana Highway 342
- Louisiana Highway 343
- Louisiana Highway 353
- Louisiana Highway 700
- Louisiana Highway 719
- Louisiana Highway 720
- Louisiana Highway 723
- Louisiana Highway 725
- Louisiana Highway 726
- Louisiana Highway 728-2
- Louisiana Highway 728-3
- Louisiana Highway 729
- Louisiana Highway 733
- Louisiana Highway 1096
- Louisiana Highway 1252
- Louisiana Highway 3025
- Louisiana Highway 3073
- Louisiana Highway 3184

=== Adjacent parishes ===
- St. Landry Parish (north)
- St. Martin Parish (east)
- Iberia Parish (southeast)
- Vermilion Parish (south)
- Acadia Parish (west)

=== National protected area ===
- Jean Lafitte National Historical Park and Preserve (part, in Lafayette)

=== Communities ===
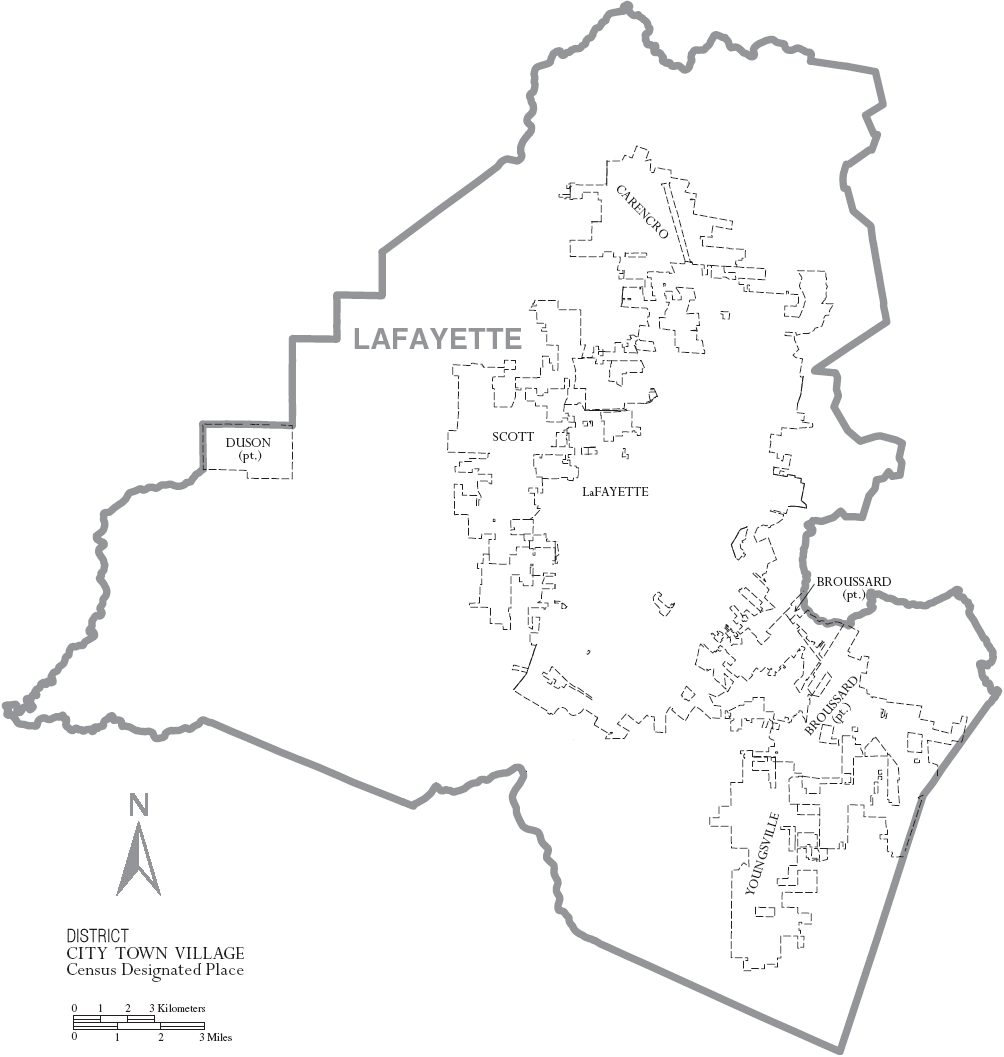
Map of Lafayette Parish, with municipal labels

==== Cities ====
- Broussard (partly in St. Martin Parish)
- Carencro
- Lafayette (parish seat and largest municipality)
- Scott
- Youngsville

==== Town ====
- Duson (partly in Acadia Parish)

==== Census-designated places ====
- Milton
- Ossun

==== Other communities ====
- Billeaud
- Capitan
- Elks
- Judice
- Larabee
- Mouton
- Pilette
- Pont Des Mouton
- Ridge
- River Ranch
- Sadou
- Stekey
- Vatican
- Walroy

== Demographics ==
Historical population
Census	Pop.	Note	%±
1830	5,653		—
1840	7,841		38.7%
1850	6,720		−14.3%
1860	9,003		34.0%
1870	10,388		15.4%
1880	13,235		27.4%
1890	15,966		20.6%
1900	22,825		43.0%
1910	28,733		25.9%
1920	30,841		7.3%
1930	38,827		25.9%
1940	43,941		13.2%
1950	57,743		31.4%
1960	84,656		46.6%
1970	109,716		29.6%
1980	150,017		36.7%
1990	164,762		9.8%
2000	190,503		15.6%
2010	221,578		16.3%
2020	241,753		9.1%
2025 (est.)	257,949	▲	6.7%
U.S. Decennial Census; 1790-1960 1900-1990; 1990-2000 2010-2019

Lafayette Parish, Louisiana – Racial and ethnic composition Note: the US Census treats Hispanic/Latino as an ethnic category. This table excludes Latinos from the racial categories and assigns them to a separate category. Hispanics/Latinos may be of any race.
Race / Ethnicity (NH = Non-Hispanic)	Pop 1980	Pop 1990	Pop 2000	Pop 2010	Pop 2020	% 1980	% 1990	% 2000	% 2010	% 2020
White alone (NH)	114,922	123,436	137,762	148,972	150,475	76.61%	74.92%	72.31%	67.23%	62.24%
Black or African American alone (NH)	29,963	36,652	45,149	56,633	60,677	19.97%	22.25%	23.70%	25.56%	25.10%
Native American or Alaska Native alone (NH)	214	340	498	683	716	0.14%	0.21%	0.26%	0.31%	0.30%
Asian alone (NH)	681	1,563	2,041	3,293	5,212	0.45%	0.95%	1.07%	1.49%	2.16%
Native Hawaiian or Pacific Islander alone (NH)	x	x	47	57	68	x	x	0.02%	0.03%	0.03%
Other race alone (NH)	516	158	197	373	904	0.34%	0.10%	0.10%	0.17%	0.37%
Mixed race or Multiracial (NH)	x	x	1,489	2,970	7,718	x	x	0.78%	1.34%	3.19%
Hispanic or Latino (any race)	3,721	2,613	3,320	8,597	15,983	2.48%	1.59%	1.74%	3.88%	6.61%
Total	150,017	164,762	190,503	221,578	241,753	100.00%	100.00%	100.00%	100.00%	100.00%

According to the 2020 United States census, there were 241,753 people, 94,490 households, and 59,937 families residing in the parish. According to the 2019 American Community Survey, there were 244,390 people living in the parish. The racial and ethnic makeup of Lafayette Parish was 65.7% non-Hispanic white, 25.9% Black and African American, 0.2% American Indian and Alaska Native, 1.9% Asian, 0.3% some other race, 1.5% two or more races, and 4.6% Hispanic and Latino American of any race. In 2020, the racial and ethnic makeup was 62.24% non-Hispanic white, 25.1% Black and African American, 0.3% American Indian and Alaska Native, 2.16% Asian, 0.03% Pacific Islander, 3.57% multiracial or some other race, and 6.61% Hispanic or Latino American of any race.

In 2019, the median age was 35.2 and 76.2% of the population were aged 18 and older; 12.7% of the population were aged 65 and older. Of its population, 4.2% were foreign born, with the majority coming from Latin America, Asia, and Europe. Among the population, 10.1% spoke another language other than English at home; Spanish was the second most-spoken language in 2019, and French was third.

There were 91,543 households at the 2019 census estimates, and 44.4% were married couples living together; 8.0% of households were cohabiting couples, 17.8% male households with no female present, 12.7% single-person households, and 29.7% female households with no female present. The average household size was 2.59 and the average family size was 3.22. There was an employment rate of 62.5% and 28,206 businesses operating in the parish; 5,734 businesses were minority-owned and 2,774 were veteran-owned.

Out of the 102,491 housing units in 2019, the median gross rent was $874, and median housing value was $185,300. At the 2019 American Community Survey, the median household income was $56,999; males had a median income of $54,653 versus $38,378 for females. An estimated 17.3% of the population lived at or below the poverty line.

== Education ==
Lafayette Parish School System operates public schools for the parish. Its boundaries parallel those of the parish.

Lafayette Parish is home to the University of Louisiana at Lafayette, Louisiana's second largest public university behind Louisiana State University. It is also home to the main campus of South Louisiana Community College (the parish is in the community college's service area), a Remington College in Lafayette, a Blue Cliff College in Lafayette, an Aveda Institute, and a Louisiana Technical College in Lafayette.

== Politics ==
The parish voters often supported Democratic presidential candidates before the 1970s, but the majority of conservative whites has trended Republican since that time. Before 1965 and passage of the Voting Rights Act by the U.S Congress, most African Americans were disenfranchised, as they had been since 1898, when Louisiana passed a new constitution establishing barriers to voter registration and voting. After regaining the power to register and vote, black voters tended to affiliate with and support national Democratic Party candidates.

The majority of the parish voted for the Republican presidential candidates from 1992 to 2020, and did so by generally increasing margins. The results in 2004 gave Republican George W. Bush 64% of the vote and 57,732 votes while Democrat John F. Kerry won 35% of the vote and 31,210 votes. In the 2008 election Lafayette Parish cast the majority of its votes for Republican John McCain. He won 65% of the vote and 62,055 votes. Democrat Barack Obama was strongly supported by African Americans and won 34% of the vote, some 32,145 votes.

United States presidential election results for Lafayette Parish, Louisiana
Year	Republican		Democratic		Third party(ies)	
Year	No.	%	No.	%	No.	%
1912	244	23.95%	646	63.40%	129	12.66%
1916	73	4.52%	1,066	66.01%	476	29.47%
1920	1,045	55.94%	823	44.06%	0	0.00%
1924	531	28.97%	978	53.36%	324	17.68%
1928	592	15.62%	3,197	84.38%	0	0.00%
1932	291	6.75%	4,019	93.21%	2	0.05%
1936	306	6.28%	4,570	93.72%	0	0.00%
1940	1,850	22.64%	6,323	77.36%	0	0.00%
1944	742	13.39%	4,801	86.61%	0	0.00%
1948	2,068	27.21%	1,787	23.52%	3,744	49.27%
1952	6,470	50.10%	6,443	49.90%	0	0.00%
1956	6,711	57.10%	4,695	39.95%	347	2.95%
1960	6,047	26.66%	14,132	62.30%	2,505	11.04%
1964	12,398	46.11%	14,487	53.89%	0	0.00%
1968	10,669	35.12%	7,983	26.28%	11,723	38.59%
1972	22,939	69.10%	8,740	26.33%	1,519	4.58%
1976	22,805	52.19%	19,918	45.58%	976	2.23%
1980	31,429	58.72%	19,694	36.79%	2,403	4.49%
1984	44,344	68.80%	19,265	29.89%	849	1.32%
1988	36,648	59.44%	24,133	39.14%	877	1.42%
1992	32,406	45.16%	28,583	39.83%	10,773	15.01%
1996	36,419	48.91%	32,504	43.65%	5,545	7.45%
2000	48,491	61.94%	27,190	34.73%	2,612	3.34%
2004	57,732	64.20%	31,210	34.71%	981	1.09%
2008	62,055	64.88%	32,145	33.61%	1,442	1.51%
2012	64,992	65.89%	31,768	32.21%	1,882	1.91%
2016	68,195	64.58%	32,726	30.99%	4,682	4.43%
2020	72,519	63.32%	39,685	34.65%	2,317	2.02%
2024	72,007	64.82%	37,170	33.46%	1,909	1.72%

== Law enforcement ==
Lafayette Parish Sheriff's Office
- Common name: Sheriff's Office
- Abbreviation: LPSO
- Motto: "Serving the community with courtesy, professionalism, and respect."

Jurisdictional structure
- Legal jurisdiction: Parish (County)
- General nature: Local civilian police

Operational structure
- Headquarters: Lafayette, Louisiana
- Deputy Sheriffs: 500
- Unsworn employees: 250
- Agency executive: Mark T. Garber, Sheriff
- Divisions: 7: Corrections; Enforcement; Finance/Technology/Civil; Human Resources; Training/Professional Development; Internal Affairs

Facilities
- Stations: 4
- Jails: 1
- Patrol Cars: Ford Crown Victoria Police Interceptor, Chevrolet Impala
- Patrol Motorcycles: Harley Davidson

Website
- http://www.lafayettesheriff.com/

The Lafayette Parish Sheriff's Office (LPSO) is the sheriff's department in Lafayette Parish, Louisiana. The department, headed by Sheriff Mark T. Garber, consists of around 750 sworn and non-sworn employees. Although the LPSO's jurisdiction consists of the entire parish of Lafayette, in order to not duplicate services provided by local city police, the primary patrol area is the unincorporated areas of the parish. It also runs the Lafayette Parish Correctional Center. The LPSO is CALEA (Commission on Accreditation for Law Enforcement Agencies) accredited and has taken part in Operation FALCON.

In 2003, the Lafayette Parish Sheriff's Office joined with the University of Louisiana to create ALETA, the Acadiana Law Enforcement Training Academy. This academy trains new LPSO deputies and UL Police officers, as well as recruits from several other police agencies in South Louisiana, to become P.O.S.T. certified law enforcement officers. The program is an eleven-week course that provides physical training and conditioning along with classroom instruction.

Lafayette Parish is further served by the Lafayette Police Department, University of Louisiana at Lafayette Police Department, and the Lafayette City Marshal.

== National Guard ==
The HQ and other units of the 256th IBCT reside in the city of Lafayette, Louisiana. This unit of over 3,500 Soldiers has deployed twice to Iraq, 2004-5 and 2010. This unit has also responded to disasters such as: Hurricane Katrina, Hurricane Gustav, Hurricane Isaac, and the Gulf of Mexico Oil Spill.

== Notable people ==
- Lauren Daigle, (born 1991), Grammy-nominated CCM singer
- Jefferson Caffery, (1886-1974), U.S. Ambassador to El Salvador, Colombia, Cuba, Brazil, France and Egypt.
- Gladys Clark, (1918–2011), Cajun spinner and weaver
- Benjamin Flanders, (1816-1896), politician, Alderman of New Orleans (1847-1852), founder of the Republican Party of Louisiana in 1864, appointed governor of Louisiana in 1867, retired in 1880s to his Ben Alva plantation here.
- Jerry Luke LeBlanc (born 1956), former state legislator and vice president of administration and finance at the University of Louisiana at Lafayette.
- Alexandre Mouton, (1804–1885), born in Attakapas, United States Senator and Governor of Louisiana.
- Frank Schmitz, (1945-1966), four time NCAA champion gymnast and silver medal winner at the 1965 Trampoline World Championships.
- Fred Prejean, (1946-2022) community leader and American activist.
- Dustin Poirier, (born 1989), professional mixed martial artist. Ultimate Fighting Championship Lightweight competitor and former Interim UFC Lightweight Champion.

== See also ==
- Lafayette Parish Sheriff's Office
- National Register of Historic Places listings in Lafayette Parish, Louisiana
