= Gladys Clark =

Cajun spinner and weaver

Gladys LeBlanc Clark
- Born: October 31, 1918; Lafayette Parish, Louisiana
- Died: September 10, 2011 (aged 92)
- Style: Spinning, weaving
- Awards: National Heritage Fellowship

Gladys LeBlanc Clark (October 31, 1918 – September 10, 2011) was a Cajun spinner and weaver. Born in Lafayette Parish, Louisiana, she learned to grow and spin cotton at a young age. In 1997 she was awarded a National Heritage Fellowship by the National Endowment for the Arts for her traditional Cajun spinning and weaving skills. Clark was one of the last traditional Acadian weavers of coton jaune in Louisiana.

== Biography ==
Gladys LeBlanc was born on October 31, 1918, in Lafayette Parish, Louisiana into a Cajun family of farmers and weavers. Her father Ambrose LeBlanc was a farmer, and her mother Colastie Hebert LeBlanc was a multigenerational weaver and spinner. Gladys was one of nine children and learned to comb and card cotton at an early age, encouraged by her mother, aunts and female relatives. By age eight she could spin cotton and in her teens she became a proficient weaver.

=== Cajun weaving ===
Cotton domestic ware held a great importance in Cajun homes and families. When Gladys LeBlanc married her husband Alexis "Blacko" Clark, she was gifted a trousseau of linens by her mother. The trousseau, known as L’Amour de Maman, comprised the traditional dowry for Cajun brides, comprised a set of textiles for the couple that would last for marriage. As she had children, Gladys Clark began work on building the trousseaus of her children.

In the 1940s Clark and her family members began to demonstrate Cajun weaving techniques for Louisiana State University's Louisiana Handicrafts Project, specifically the use of Acadian "coton jaune" or brown cotton. Around this time, she became serious about developing her craft. She grew, picked, carded and spun cotton on her farm with her husband. In the 1970s and 1980s, she began to exhibit her works at festivals and museums. In the 1990s, she expanded her range of handicrafts beyond domestic items, creating scarves. Clark resided in Duson, Louisiana.

=== Honors and legacy ===
In 1997 Clark was honored with a National Heritage Fellowship by the National Endowment for the Arts. On October 21, 2006, Clark was inducted into the Order of Living Legends of the Acadian Museum.

Gladys Clark died on September 10, 2011.

In the 1980s, Clark took on an apprentice to pass on her traditional skills, Elaine Larcade Bourque. Lacarde Bourque collected Clark's brown cotton seeds and continued to grow the crop in Lafayette, Louisiana. Today, Lacarde Bourque is a Louisiana tradition bearer for Acadian weaving.

== Exhibitions ==
- 2024, “Woven Louisiana History: Acadian Textiles" Louisiana State University
