= Judice, Louisiana =

- Unincorporated community
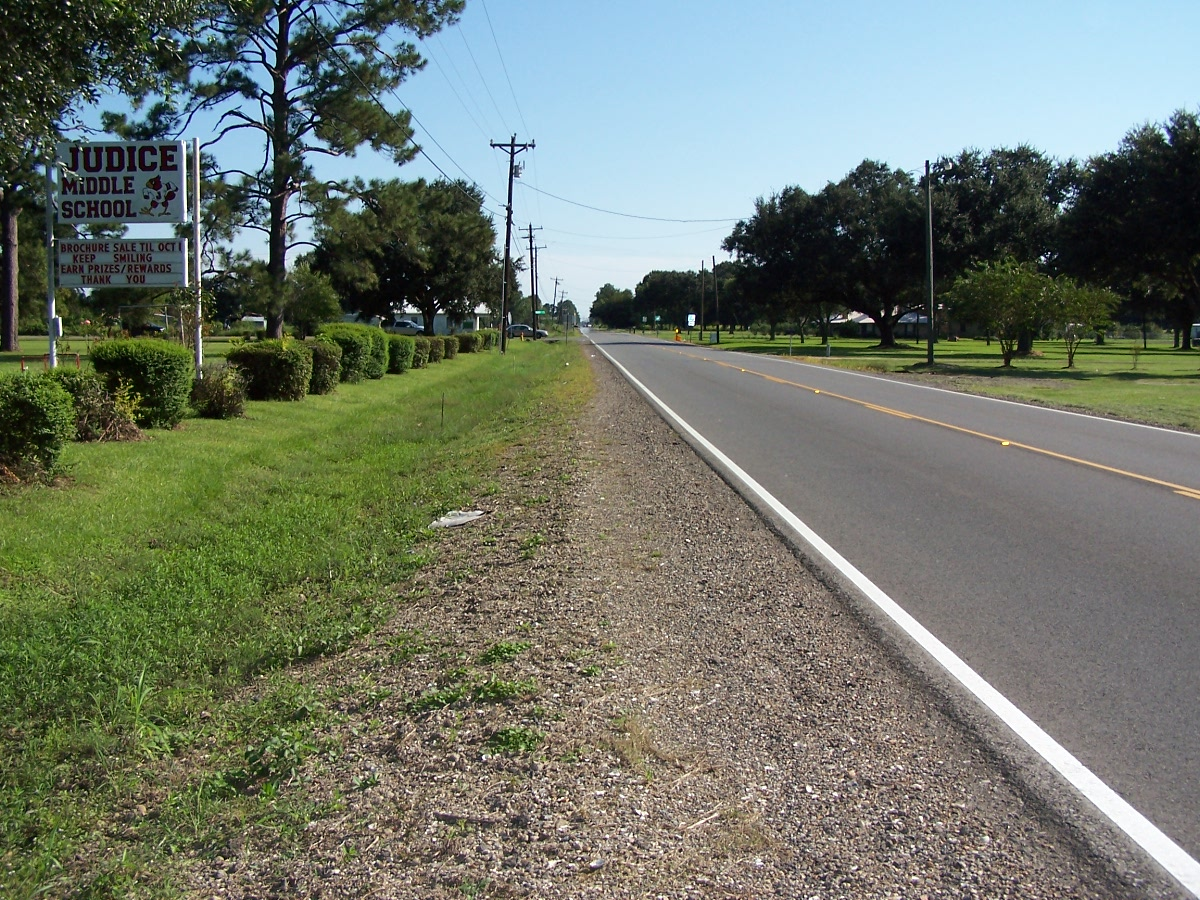
- Downtown Judice

- Location in Louisiana Location in the United States
- Coordinates: 30°14′17″N 92°05′31″W
- Country: United States
- State: Louisiana
- Parish: Lafayette
- Founded: 1858 (168 years ago) as Foreman Flats
- Renamed: 1929 (97 years ago) as Judice

Area
  - Total: 8.9 sq mi (23 km^{2})
  - Land: 8.9 sq mi (23 km^{2})
  - Water: 0.0 sq mi (0 km^{2})
- Elevation: 36 ft (11 m)
- Time zone: UTC-6 (CST)
  - Summer (DST): UTC-5 (CDT)
- Area code: 337

Judice is an unincorporated community in Lafayette Parish, Louisiana, United States.

"Foreman Flats" was the original name of the area, which included Ridge Road in the north, Doc Duhon Road in the south, Lagneaux Road in the east, and South Fieldspan Road in the west. However, the Judice area is known as residing between W. Congress street, Coulee Isle des Cannes/Johnston Street, S. Richfield, and Percy Bourque Road/John LeBlanc Road in Lafayette Parish. The community is located near the intersection of Louisiana Highway 342 and Louisiana Highway 724.

The first settler was Edward G. F. Broussard in 1858 when he bought 160 acres (0.65 km^{2}). Other original settlers of the area came from Georgia, South Carolina, and North Carolina. John C. Smith was also one of the early settlers and he was the only known slave owner. After the end of slavery, many of Smith's slaves stayed on the land and worked as tenant farmers and continue to live in the Judice area today.

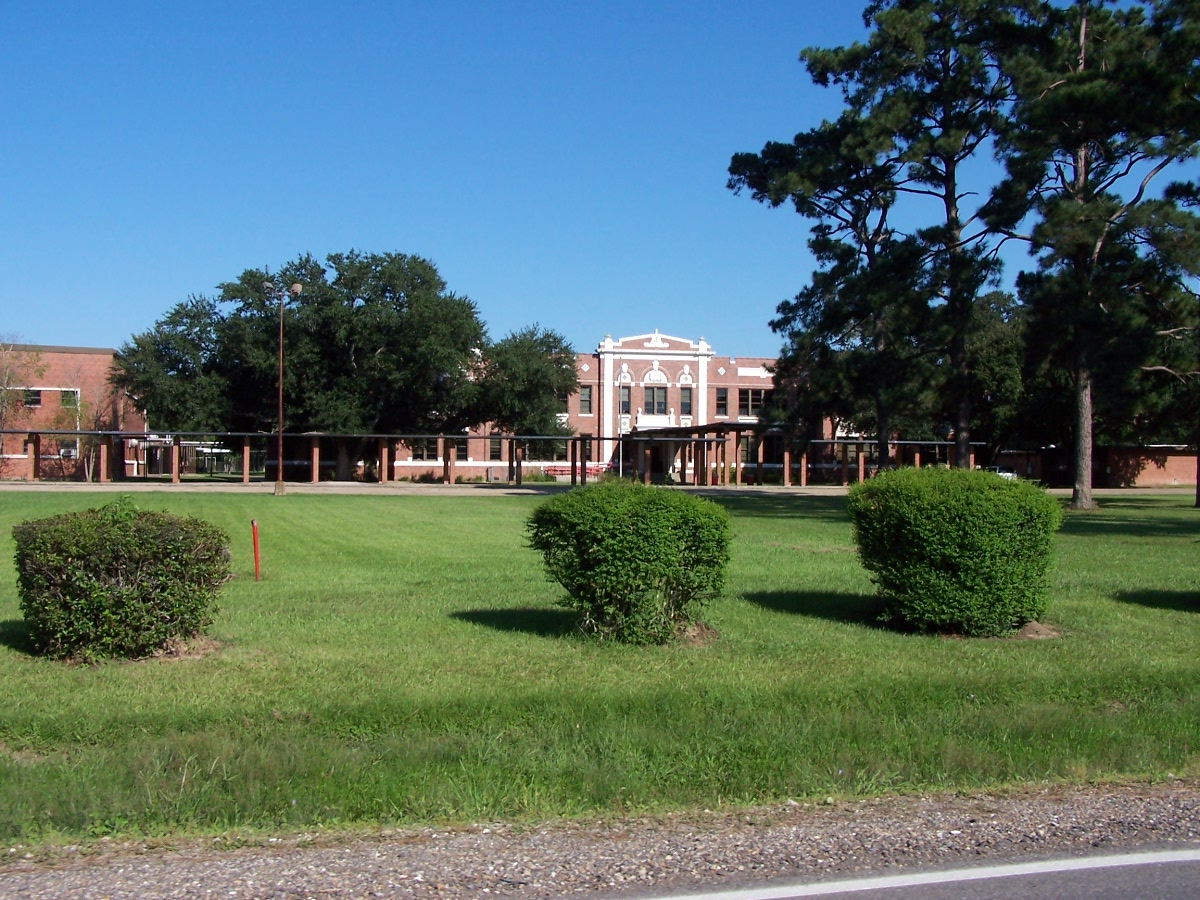
Judice Middle School today.

In 1900, increasing school enrollment led to the construction of three new schools in the area; the Burke School, Alex Broussard School, and Alcide Judice School. These were meant to replace the one-room schools that were scattered in this part of the parish.

During the Great Depression of the 1930s, Gerard Foreman's land was repossessed for the purpose of building Judice High School, named after Alcide Judice, a successful merchant and political activist who contributed to the parish's education. Within a short time, people began referring to the area as Judice.

== Today ==
This area of Lafayette Parish was, as it is today, mostly rural, and still involved in agricultural pursuits. Today, rice and crawfish are the major uses of agricultural property in the vicinity, along with dairy farming, oil and mineral leases, and horse training. Judice is also a very common name in Louisiana.
