= Vatican, Louisiana =

Unincorporated community in Louisiana, U.S.

Coordinates: 30°18′34″N 92°06′59″W

Vatican is an unincorporated community in Lafayette Parish, Louisiana, United States.

The community is named after Vatican City with street names such as Vatican Road, Vatican Square Drive, Pope Drive, and Bishop Street. It is located near the intersection of Louisiana Highway 93 and Vatican Road.
