= Voorhies Trahan =

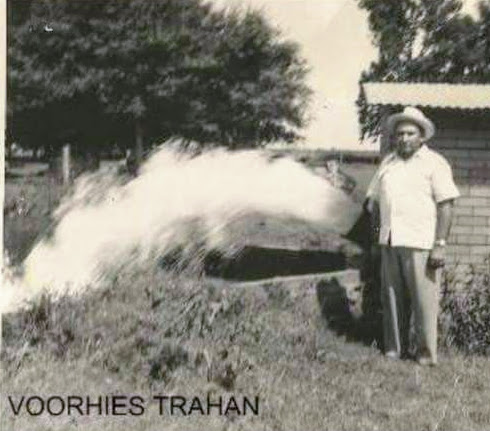
Voorhies Trahan standing near the water well he used to flood rice fields (January 2, 1956)

Voorhies Trahan (July 1, 1897 – September 16, 1963), along with his second wife Aloncel "Ciel" Trahan (Credeur), was instrumental in pioneering the crawfish farming industry in Louisiana rice fields.

Shortly after the end of World War II, Trahan was the first farmer in the state of Louisiana to start producing crawfish in the same fields that he planted rice. This was done by rotating the crops. The rice was a summer crop, while the crawfish were a winter crop. According to biologist Percy Viosca Jr., Trahan was given "full credit" for pioneering this method of producing a crawfish crop. Trahan's rice fields were located about six miles south of Duson, Louisiana. This method of crawfish farming continues today and has grown into Louisiana's largest freshwater crustacean industry, with annual revenues that exceed US$300 million.
