= Elks, Louisiana =

Unincorporated community in Louisiana, U.S.

Coordinates: 30°10′58″N 91°59′21″W

Elks is an unincorporated community in Lafayette Parish, Louisiana, United States.

The community is located near the intersection of US 90 and East Verot School Road.
