= Grand Bayou Reservoir =

Lake in Louisiana, United States

- Location within Louisiana Location within the United States
- Location: Fairview Alpha, Louisiana, United States
- Coordinates: 32.004°N 93.254°W

Grand Bayou Reservoir is a lake in Fairview Alpha, Louisiana.
