= Ossun, Louisiana =

- Census-designated place
- Location within Louisiana Location within the United States
- Country: United States
- States: Louisiana
- Parish: Lafayette

Area
  - Total: 3.39 sq mi (8.79 km^{2})
  - Land: 3.39 sq mi (8.79 km^{2})
  - Water: 0 sq mi (0.00 km^{2})
- Elevation: 39 ft (12 m)

Population (2020)
  - Total: 2,145
  - Density: 630/sq mi (244/km^{2})
- Time zone: UTC-6 (CST)
  - Summer (DST): UTC-5 (CDT)
- Area code: 337
- FIPS code: 22-58360

Ossun is an unincorporated community and census-designated place in Lafayette Parish, Louisiana, United States. In 2020, its population was 2,145. The community is named after the area of Ossun, France, near Lourdes.

== Geography ==
Ossun is in northwestern Lafayette Parish, around the intersection of Louisiana Highway 93 and Louisiana Highway 723. It is 8 miles (13 km) northwest of Lafayette, the parish seat, 3 miles (5 km) north of Scott, and 6 miles (10 km) southwest of Carencro.

According to the U.S. Census Bureau, the Ossun CDP has an area of 3.39 square miles (8.79 km^{2}), all of it recorded as land.

== Demographics ==
Historical population
Census	Pop.	Note	%±
2010	2,144		—
2020	2,145		0.0%
U.S. Decennial Census

Ossn was first listed as a census designated place in the 2010 U.S. census.

Ossun racial composition as of 2020
Race	Number	Percentage
White (non-Hispanic)	1,045	48.72%
Black or African American (non-Hispanic)	957	44.62%
Asian	1	0.05%
Other/Mixed	59	2.75%
Hispanic or Latino	83	3.87%

As of the 2020 United States census, there were 2,145 people, 609 households, and 406 families residing in the CDP.
