= Mira, Louisiana =

- Unincorporated community
- Location within Louisiana Location within the United States
- Coordinates: 32°56′31″N 93°53′21″W
- Country: United States
- State: Louisiana
- Parish: Caddo
- Elevation: 226 ft (69 m)
- Time zone: UTC-6 (Central (CST))
  - Summer (DST): UTC-5 (CDT)
- Area code: 318
- GNIS feature ID: 543476

Mira is an unincorporated community in Caddo Parish, Louisiana, United States.
