= Stanley, Louisiana =

- Village
- Village of Stanley
- Location of Stanley in De Soto Parish, Louisiana.

- Location of Louisiana in the United States
- Coordinates: 31°57′39″N 93°53′58″W
- Country: United States
- State: Louisiana
- Parish: DeSoto

Area
  - Total: 2.19 sq mi (5.68 km^{2})
  - Land: 2.17 sq mi (5.62 km^{2})
  - Water: 0.019 sq mi (0.05 km^{2})
- Elevation: 299 ft (91 m)

Population (2020)
  - Total: 132
  - Density: 60.8/sq mi (23.47/km^{2})
- Time zone: UTC-6 (CST)
  - Summer (DST): UTC-5 (CDT)
- Area code: 318
- FIPS code: 22-72800
- GNIS feature ID: 2407554

Stanley is a village in DeSoto Parish, Louisiana, United States. As of the 2020 census, Stanley had a population of 132. It is part of the Shreveport–Bossier City Metropolitan Statistical Area.

== Geography ==
Stanley is located in western DeSoto Parish. U.S. Route 84 passes through the center of the village, leading west 6 miles (10 km) to Logansport and northeast 14 miles (23 km) to Mansfield, the parish seat.

According to the United States Census Bureau, the village of Stanley has a total area of 2.2 square miles (5.7 km^{2}), of which 0.02 square miles (0.05 km^{2}), or 0.95%, is water.

== Demographics ==
Historical population
Census	Pop.	Note	%±
1960	234		—
1970	145		−38.0%
1980	151		4.1%
1990	131		−13.2%
2000	145		10.7%
2010	107		−26.2%
2020	132		23.4%
2025 (est.)	126	▼	−4.5%
U.S. Decennial Census

As of the census of 2000, there were 145 people, 56 households, and 43 families residing in the village. The population density was 66.2 inhabitants per square mile (25.6/km^{2}). There were 63 housing units at an average density of 28.7 per square mile (11.1/km^{2}). The racial makeup of the village was 88.97% White, 10.34% African American, 0.69% from other races. Hispanic or Latino of any race were 1.38% of the population.

There were 56 households, out of which 33.9% had children under the age of 18 living with them, 60.7% were married couples living together, 14.3% had a female householder with no husband present, and 23.2% were non-families. 23.2% of all households were made up of individuals, and 12.5% had someone living alone who was 65 years of age or older. The average household size was 2.59 and the average family size was 3.02.

In the village, the population was spread out, with 28.3% under the age of 18, 6.2% from 18 to 24, 26.9% from 25 to 44, 19.3% from 45 to 64, and 19.3% who were 65 years of age or older. The median age was 36 years. For every 100 females, there were 85.9 males. For every 100 females age 18 and over, there were 82.5 males.

The median income for a household in the village was $31,477, and the median income for a family was $57,500. Males had a median income of $20,833 versus $13,500 for females. The per capita income for the village was $19,083. There were 19.4% of families and 22.2% of the population living below the poverty line, including 55.9% of under eighteens and 16.2% of those over 64.
