= Mouton, Louisiana =

Unincorporated community in Louisiana, U.S.

Coordinates: 30°16′27″N 92°01′59″W

Mouton is an unincorporated community in Lafayette Parish, Louisiana, United States.

The community is named after Jean and Marin Mouton, two local land owners who settled the area during the 1770s. It is located along West Pont Des Mouton Road between LA Hwy 182 and I-49.
