= Scott, Louisiana =

- City
- City of Scott
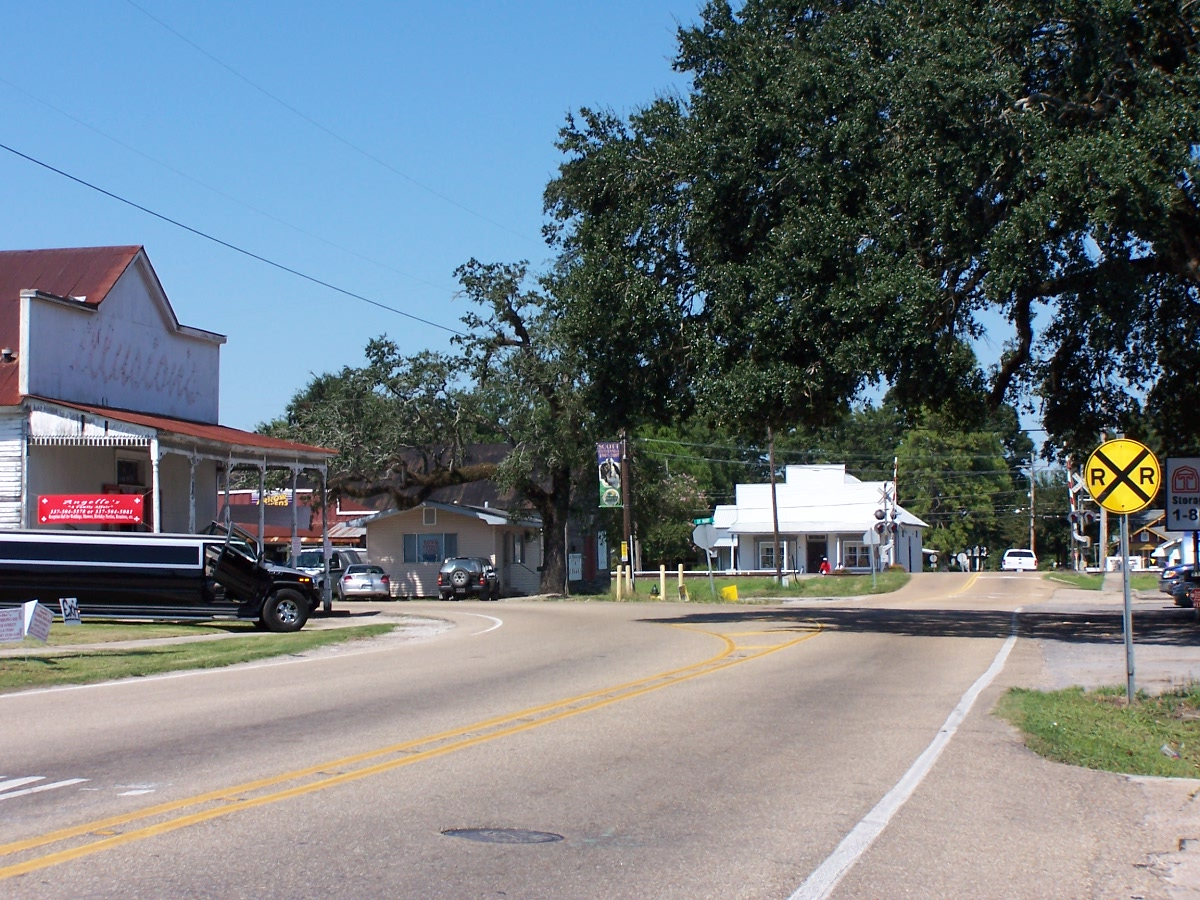
- Downtown

- Flag
- Mottoes: "Boudin capital of the world" "Where the West begins"
- Location in Lafayette Parish, Louisiana

- Location of Louisiana in the United States
- Coordinates: 30°14′17″N 92°05′31″W
- Country: United States
- State: Louisiana
- Parish: Lafayette

Government
  - Mayor: Purvis Morrison (D) (defeated 2018); Jan-Scott Richard (R)
  - Police Chief: Chad Leger

Area
  - Total: 11.73 sq mi (30.39 km^{2})
  - Land: 11.73 sq mi (30.39 km^{2})
  - Water: 0 sq mi (0.00 km^{2})
- Elevation: 36 ft (11 m)

Population (2020)
  - Total: 8,119
  - Density: 691.9/sq mi (267.16/km^{2})
- Time zone: UTC-6 (CST)
  - Summer (DST): UTC-5 (CDT)
- ZIP code: 70583
- Area code: 337
- FIPS code: 22-68475
- Website: cityofscott.org

Scott is the fourth largest municipality in Lafayette Parish, Louisiana, United States. The population was 8,614 as of the 2010 U.S. census, and 8,119 at the 2020 census, up from 7,870 at the 2000 census. Scott is a suburban community of Lafayette and is part of the Lafayette metropolitan statistical area in Acadiana.

== History ==
In 1902, Gabby Anderson built a western-style saloon to serve as "an exclusive, all-men's bar and a meeting place for old folks." His reason for the saloon is because he believed "this is where the West begins." However, it is believed that the slogan started because Scott was where eastern train fare rates ended and western train, referred to as the "West Line", fare rates began.

The Union Pacific Railroad, formerly the Southern Pacific Railroad, cuts the town in two. The first settler of Scott was Alexander Delhomme, who took land in the northern part of the town. Delhomme owned the first hay-mowing machine, grist mill and cotton gin. By 1880, the train depot was completed and the town became a village. In 1907, the town was incorporated and named after J. B. Scott, who was division superintendent of the Southern Pacific Railroad. The village became a town in 1960, and the town became a city in 1990.

On April 12, 2012, Scott was designated by the Louisiana State Legislature as the "Boudin Capital of the World", referring to Cajun sausage, which Scott produces more of than any other city in Louisiana. This meant that two other Louisiana towns needed to relinquish their titles. Jennings, in Jefferson Davis Parish, owns the title of "Boudin Capital of the Universe", while Broussard, also in Lafayette Parish, is now known as the "former Boudin Capital of the World", although it has also proclaimed itself the "Intergalactic Boudin Capital of Positive Infinity".

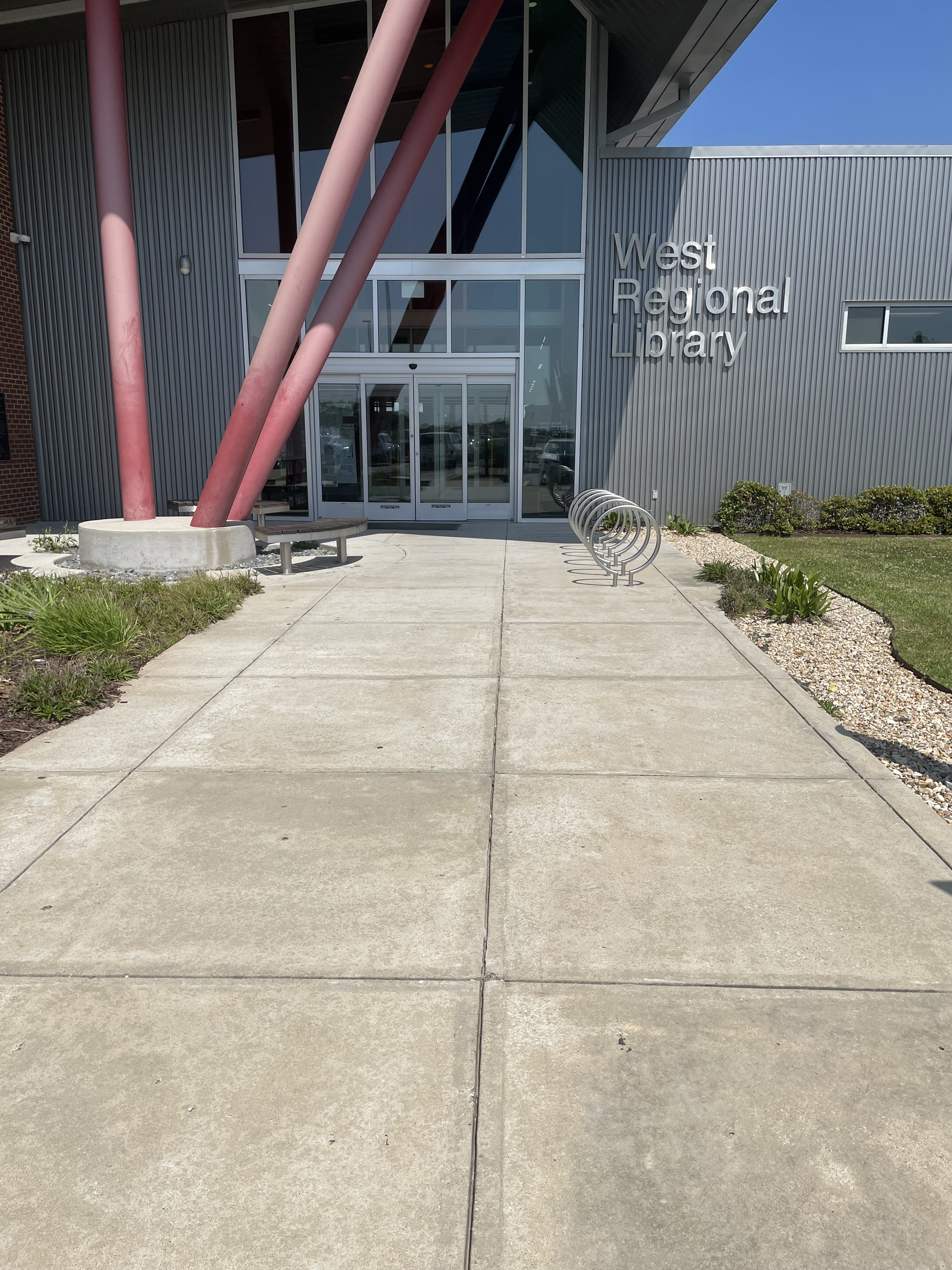
The Lafayette Parish West Regional Library serves Scott, Louisiana

== Geography ==
Scott is located in west-central Lafayette Parish at 30°14′17″N 92°5′31″W (30.237951, -92.091996). It shares its eastern and southern borders with Lafayette, the parish seat, and its northern border with unincorporated coummunity of Ossun.

U.S. Route 90 traverses the heart of Scott as Cameron Street, leading east 5 miles (8 km) to the center of Lafayette and the same distance west to Duson. Interstate 10 runs along the northern edge of Scott, accessible via Exit 97 (Louisiana Highway 93). This interstate stretches 58 miles (93 km) east to Baton Rouge, the state capital, and 67 miles (108 km) west to Lake Charles. Louisiana Highway 93 also cuts through the center of Scott, extending 23 miles (37 km) north and east to Arnaudville and 6 miles (10 km) south to the southern Lafayette.

According to the United States Census Bureau, the city of Scott encompasses a total area of 11.6 square miles (30.1 km^{2}), all of it recorded as land.

== Demographics ==
Historical population
Census	Pop.	Note	%±
1910	239		—
1920	324		35.6%
1930	344		6.2%
1940	407		18.3%
1950	688		69.0%
1960	902		31.1%
1970	1,334		47.9%
1980	2,239		67.8%
1990	4,912		119.4%
2000	7,870		60.2%
2010	8,614		9.5%
2020	8,119		−5.7%
2025 (est.)	9,635	▲	18.7%
U.S. Decennial Census

Scott racial composition as of 2020
Race	Number	Percentage
White (non-Hispanic)	5,586	68.8%
Black or African American (non-Hispanic)	1,344	16.55%
Native American	22	0.27%
Asian	131	1.61%
Pacific Islander	2	0.02%
Other/Mixed	297	3.66%
Hispanic or Latino	737	9.08%

As of the 2020 United States census, there were 8,119 people, 3,391 households, and 2,291 families residing in the city. At the 2019 American Community Survey, the racial and ethnic makeup of the city was 77.6% non-Hispanic white, 11.7% Black and African American, 0.3% American Indian and Alaska Native, 5.3% Asian, 2.2% some other race, and 2.9% multiracial. Hispanics and Latin Americans of any race made up 11.6% of the population. In 2019, the median household income was $54,551 and the poverty rate was 12.5%.

According to the 2000 census, there were 7,870 people, 2,920 households, and 2,143 families residing in the city. The population density was 885.6 inhabitants per square mile (341.9/km^{2}). There were 3,154 housing units at an average density of 354.9 per square mile (137.0/km^{2}). The racial makeup of the city was 85.78% White, 11.56% African American, 0.33% Native American, 0.95% Asian, 0.01% Pacific Islander, 0.50% from other races, and 0.86% from two or more races. Hispanic or Latin Americans of any race were 1.30% of the population.

There were 2,920 households, out of which 42.5% had children under the age of 18 living with them, 54.5% were married couples living together, 14.6% had a female householder with no husband present, and 26.6% were non-families. 20.8% of all households were made up of individuals, and 5.7% had someone living alone who was 65 years of age or older. The average household size was 2.69 and the average family size was 3.13.

In the city, the population was spread out, with 30.0% under the age of 18, 10.8% from 18 to 24, 33.1% from 25 to 44, 18.9% from 45 to 64, and 7.2% who were 65 years of age or older. The median age was 31 years. For every 100 females, there were 93.0 males. For every 100 females age 18 and over, there were 87.2 males.

The median income for a household in the city was $37,320, and the median income for a family was $41,538. Males had a median income of $31,446 versus $22,229 for females. The per capita income for the city was $15,469. About 11.9% of families and 14.2% of the population were below the poverty line, including 15.2% of those under age 18 and 22.9% of those age 65 or over.

== Notable person ==
- Zachary Richard, Cajun singer, songwriter and poet
- Addison Duplantis, Miss Scott Louisiana 2025-2026, Acadiana High School 2026
