= Cankton, Louisiana =

- Village
- Village of Cankton
- Location of Cankton in St. Landry Parish, Louisiana.

- Location of Louisiana in the United States
- Coordinates: 30°20′33″N 92°07′15″W
- Country: United States
- State: Louisiana
- Parish: St. Landry

Area
  - Total: 2.04 sq mi (5.28 km^{2})
  - Land: 2.04 sq mi (5.28 km^{2})
  - Water: 0 sq mi (0.00 km^{2})
- Elevation: 39 ft (12 m)

Population (2020)
  - Total: 583
  - Density: 286.0/sq mi (110.42/km^{2})
- Time zone: UTC-6 (CST)
  - Summer (DST): UTC-5 (CDT)
- Area code: 337
- FIPS code: 22-12420
- GNIS feature ID: 2407426
- Website: canktonla.org

Cankton is a village in St. Landry Parish, Louisiana, United States. As of the 2020 census, Cankton had a population of 583. It is part of the Opelousas–Eunice Micropolitan Statistical Area.

== Geography ==
According to the United States Census Bureau, the village has a total area of 2.0 square miles (5.2 km^{2}), all land.

== Origins ==
Cankton, a small bedroom community located at the southern tip of St Landry Parish, was incorporated in 1960. It received its name from a prominent citizen here by the name of Dr. Lois Aristide Guidry, known to all as "Dr. Cank". It seems when he was just a boy, there were ducks and other game in the woods surrounding the property he grew up on. He loved to hunt ducks and would signify his return from a hunt by using the duck call which made the nasal sound of cank, cank, cank. When the old folks heard the call, they would say "Cank est revenue." (Cank is back) He kept the name all through childhood and apparently into adulthood as well.

When he finished high school, he went on to medical school. After receiving his degree in medicine from Tulane, he think of no better place to practice medicine than his beloved little community of "Coulee Croche" as it was known then. His first office was on Guidry Street. As the practice grew, he built a bigger office, which still stands today, on Main Street, next door to his home, which he shared with his wife, Cecile. Dr "Cank" died in July 1951 at the age of 69.

In early 1960, incorporation procedures were started and was finalized in October 1960. The community to be incorporated consisted of an elementary school, a Catholic church, a grocery store, and several homes. When looking for a name, none seemed more suitable than that of their beloved Dr. "Cank", who was always proud of his community. Freddie Miller was appointed the first mayor with George Elmo Broussard, and Jerome Guidry as the first board of alderman. In 1961, the first elections were held and Wilhelmina Savoie was elected the first mayor of Cankton as well as the first female mayor in St. Landry Parish. Former mayors include Elmo Broussard, Donald Menard, and Susan Menard. The Cankton City Hall was built in 1979 and houses the clerk's office, the police department, and community center.

== Demographics ==
Historical population
Census	Pop.	Note	%±
1970	260		—
1980	303		16.5%
1990	323		6.6%
2000	362		12.1%
2010	484		33.7%
2020	583		20.5%
2025 (est.)	563	▼	−3.4%
U.S. Decennial Census

As of the 2010 United States census, there were 484 people living in the village. The racial makeup of the village was 86.0% White, 9.1% Black, 0.8% from some other race and 1.4% from two or more races. 2.7% were Hispanic or Latino of any race.

As of the census of 2000, there were 362 people, 154 households, and 97 families living in the village. The population density was 178.7 inhabitants per square mile (69.0/km^{2}). There were 161 housing units at an average density of 79.5 per square mile (30.7/km^{2}). The racial makeup of the village was 94.20% White, 5.25% African American, 0.28% Asian, and 0.28% from two or more races.

There were 154 households, out of which 33.1% had children under the age of 18 living with them, 51.9% were married couples living together, 5.2% had a female householder with no husband present, and 37.0% were non-families. 33.1% of all households were made up of individuals, and 16.2% had someone living alone who was 65 years of age or older. The average household size was 2.35 and the average family size was 2.93.

In the village, the population was spread out, with 24.6% under the age of 18, 11.3% from 18 to 24, 29.3% from 25 to 44, 21.3% from 45 to 64, and 13.5% who were 65 years of age or older. The median age was 34 years. For every 100 females, there were 88.5 males. For every 100 females age 18 and over, there were 93.6 males.

The median income for a household in the village was $22,500, and the median income for a family was $36,250. Males had a median income of $26,731 versus $15,000 for females. The per capita income for the village was $12,225. About 19.8% of families and 26.2% of the population were below the poverty line, including 30.8% of those under age 18 and 38.0% of those age 65 or over.
