= Duson, Louisiana =

- Town
- Town of Duson
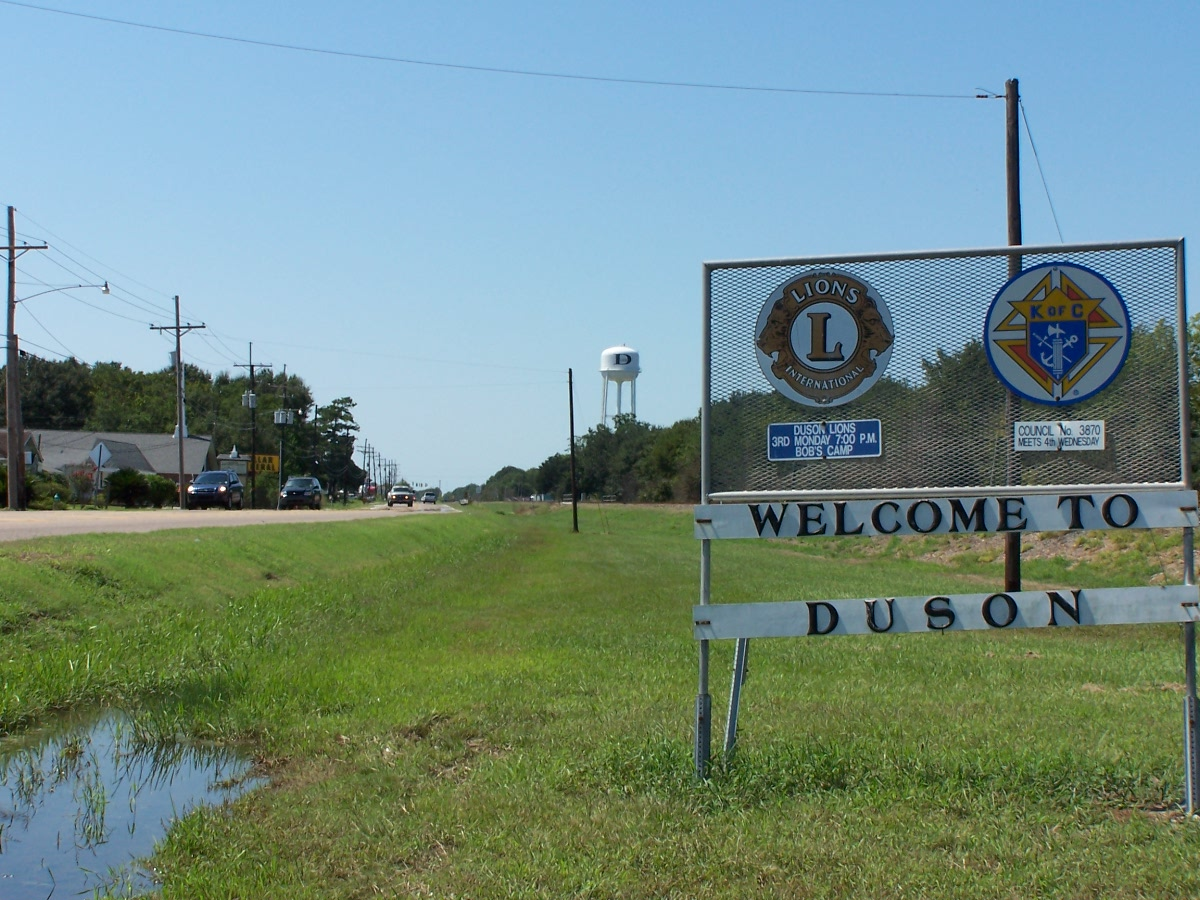
- Downtown Duson

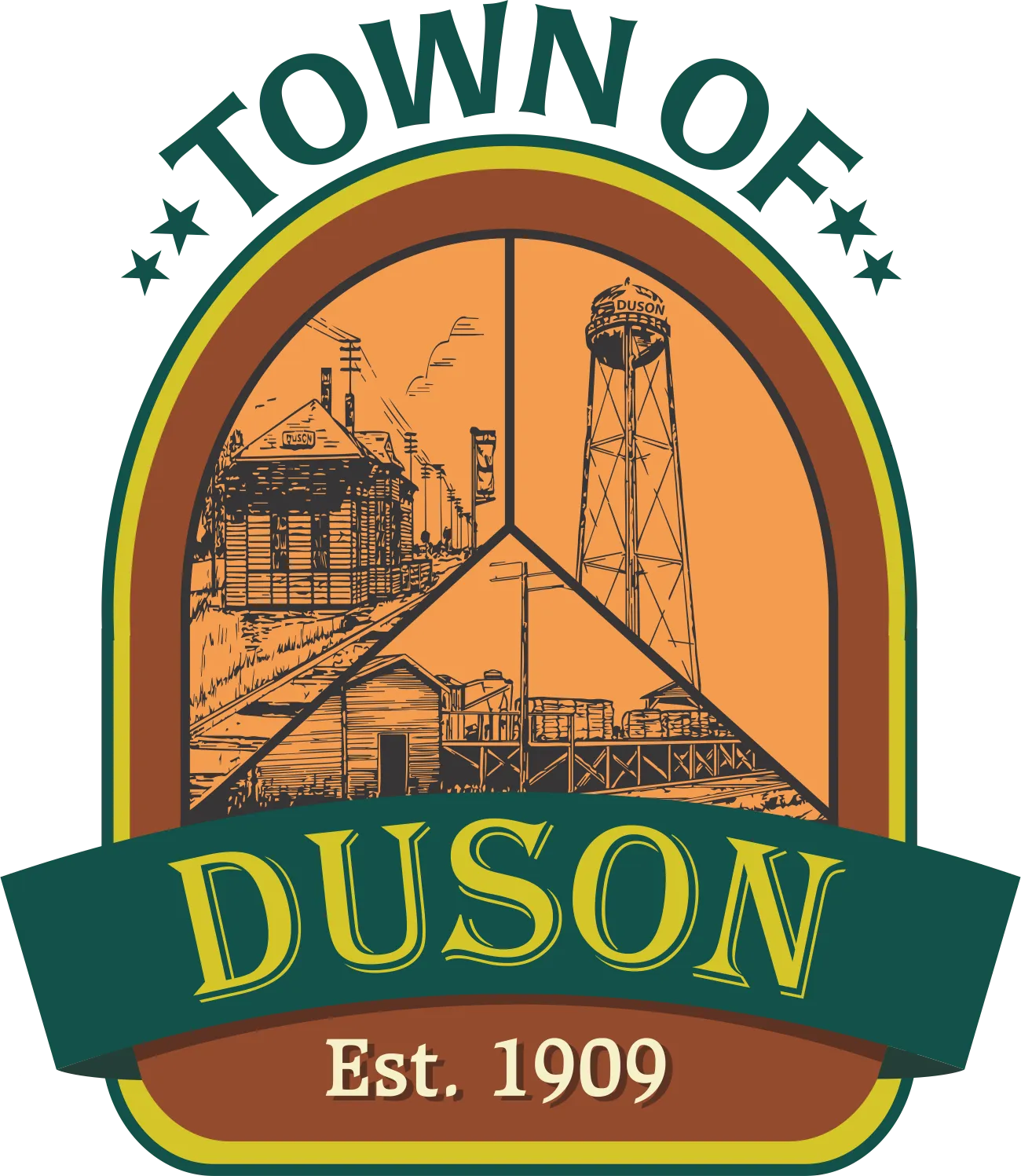
- Logo

- Location of Duson in Acadia and Lafayette Parishes, Louisiana.

- Location of Louisiana in the United States
- Coordinates: 30°14′38″N 92°11′36″W
- Country: United States
- State: Louisiana
- Parish: Acadia, Lafayette
- Named after: Cornelius C. Duson

Area
  - Total: 3.02 sq mi (7.81 km^{2})
  - Land: 3.01 sq mi (7.79 km^{2})
  - Water: 0.0077 sq mi (0.02 km^{2})
- Elevation: 33 ft (10 m)

Population (2020)
  - Total: 1,326
  - Density: 440.8/sq mi (170.21/km^{2})
- Time zone: UTC-6 (CST)
  - Summer (DST): UTC-5 (CDT)
- ZIP code: 70529
- Area code: 337
- FIPS code: 22-22255
- GNIS feature ID: 2406407
- Website: townofduson.com

Duson is a town in Acadia and Lafayette parishes in the U.S. state of Louisiana. The town was named after Curley Duson, a sheriff of St. Landry Parish. At the 2010 U.S. census, the town had a population of 1,716; in 2020, at the population estimates program, its population was 1,761. The Lafayette Parish portion of Duson is part of the Lafayette metropolitan statistical area, while the Acadia Parish portion is part of the Crowley micropolitan statistical area. Duson also has a ghost town affiliated with it, a tiny neighborhood that was made but never finished. It is currently blocked off by the town's police.

== History ==
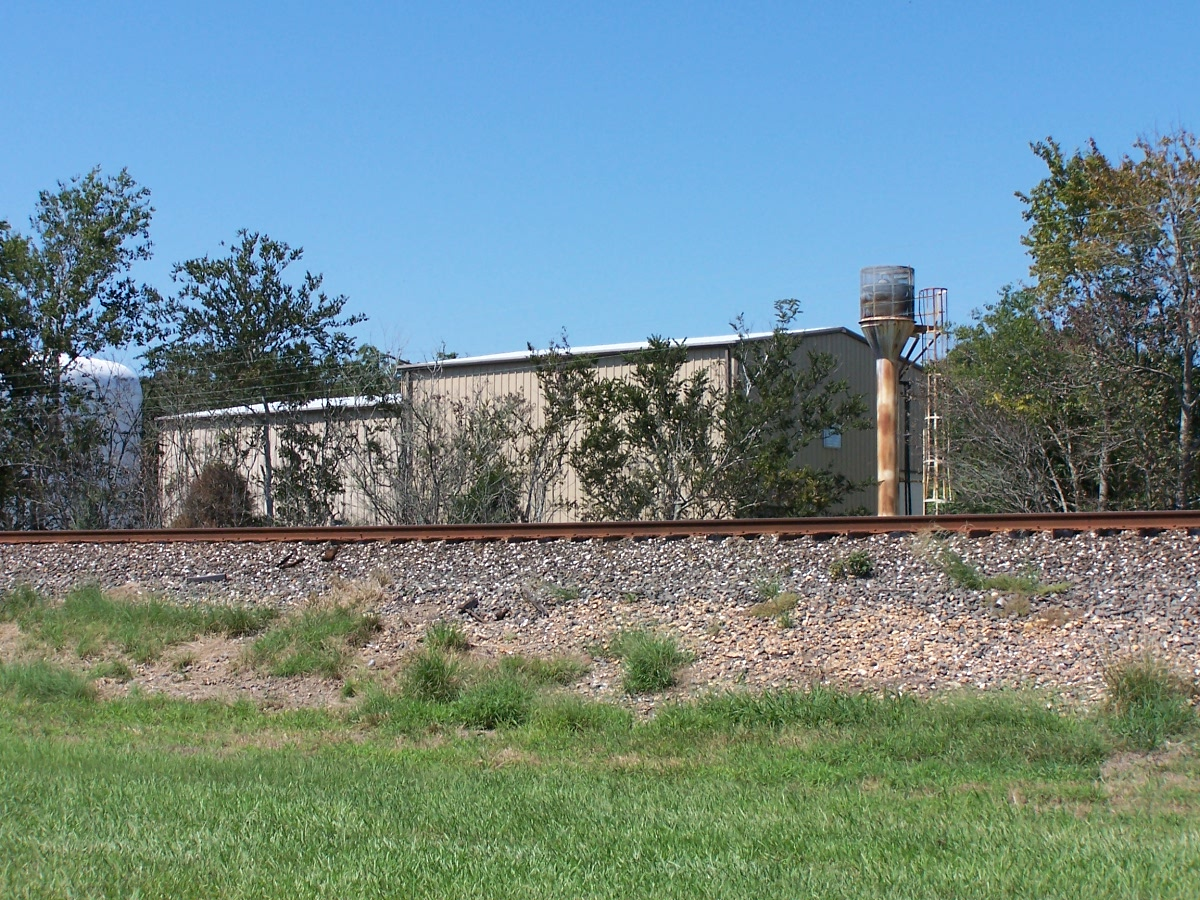
A typical cotton mill along the railroad in Duson

Originally known as "Duson Station", the town was laid out by J.G. Parkerson, general manager of the Louisiana Western Railroad. By August 30, 1880, the railroad line from New Orleans to Houston was completed, and passenger and freight service began. It merged with the Southern Pacific Railroad in 1900. The village of Duson was incorporated on December 16, 1909, named after the land developer Curley Duson, and installed Adolph De Jean as the first mayor.

In 1927, St. Theresa Catholic Church was completed. Cotton farming was the main agriculture for the area. Three cotton gins were in Duson until the mid-1960s. Fires destroyed two and the third was torn down. After World War II, small lots east of Duson were developed, with small houses using brick siding paper on the exterior. Because of that, the area became known as "Paper Town."

== Geography ==
According to the United States Census Bureau, the town has a total area of 2.8 square miles (7.2 km^{2}), of which 0.0077 square miles (0.02 km^{2}), or 0.32%, is water.

== Demographics ==
Historical population
Census	Pop.	Note	%±
1910	120		—
1920	192		60.0%
1930	396		106.3%
1940	463		16.9%
1950	707		52.7%
1960	1,033		46.1%
1970	1,199		16.1%
1980	1,253		4.5%
1990	1,465		16.9%
2000	1,672		14.1%
2010	1,716		2.6%
2020	1,326		−22.7%
2025 (est.)	1,357	▲	2.3%
U.S. Decennial Census

Duson racial composition as of 2020
Race	Number	Percentage
White (non-Hispanic)	743	56.03%
Black or African American (non-Hispanic)	354	26.7%
Native American	4	0.3%
Asian	6	0.45%
Other/Mixed	77	5.81%
Hispanic or Latino	142	10.71%

As of the 2020 United States census, there were 1,326 people, 586 households, and 415 families residing in the town. At the 2019 American Community Survey, the racial and ethnic makeup of the town was 56.7% non-Hispanic white, 38.0% Black and African American, 0.4% American Indian or Alaska Native, 1.0% two or more races, and 3.9% Hispanic and Latin American of any race. Of the population, 13.7% spoke a language other than English at home, and the median age was 31.2. In 2019, the township had a median household income of $27,604 and males had a median income of $38,403 versus $26,029 for females.

At the 2000 United States census, there were 1,672 people, 644 households, and 452 families residing in the town. The population density was 651.4 inhabitants per square mile (251.5/km^{2}). There were 724 housing units at an average density of 282.1 per square mile (108.9/km^{2}). The racial makeup of the town was 73.98% White, 25.24% African American, 0.06% Native American, 0.06% from other races, and 0.66% from two or more races. Hispanic or Latin Americans of any race were 0.36% of the population.

There were 644 households, out of which 38.2% had children under the age of 18 living with them, 41.6% were married couples living together, 20.5% had a female householder with no husband present, and 29.7% were non-families. 25.3% of all households were made up of individuals, and 8.9% had someone living alone who was 65 years of age or older. The average household size was 2.59 and the average family size was 3.07.

In the town, the population was spread out, with 30.0% under the age of 18, 10.5% from 18 to 24, 29.3% from 25 to 44, 19.6% from 45 to 64, and 10.6% who were 65 years of age or older. The median age was 32 years. For every 100 females, there were 93.3 males. For every 100 females age 18 and over, there were 85.1 males.

The median income for a household in the town was $21,071, and the median income for a family was $24,886. Males had a median income of $26,250 versus $15,476 for females. The per capita income for the town was $10,520. About 27.5% of families and 31.5% of the population were below the poverty line, including 42.7% of those under age 18 and 29.5% of those age 65 or over.

== Festivals ==
Like many other towns and cities in the Acadiana region, Duson has a local Mardi Gras celebration that includes a parade through the town. Many residents of nearby Lafayette, Scott and Rayne will converge on the town, as most parades in the region are scheduled as to not occur simultaneously.

== Notable residents ==
- Gladys Clark, Cajun spinner and weaver
- Sheri Sam, a WNBA veteran.
- Voorhies Trahan, crawfish and rice farmer
