= Fairview Alpha, Louisiana =

Fairview Alpha
- Unincorporated community
- Location within Louisiana Location within the United States Location within North America
- Coordinates: 31°58′16″N 93°11′12″W
- Country: United States
- State: Louisiana
- Parish: Natchitoches, Red River
- Time zone: UTC-6 (Central (CST))
  - Summer (DST): UTC-5 (CDT)
- Area code: 318
- GNIS feature ID: 541142

Fairview Alpha is an unincorporated community in Natchitoches and Red River parishes in the U.S. state of Louisiana. At one time, it was known as Messick and Alpha.

== History ==
According to the United States Geological Survey, Fairview Alpha was "originally named Messick for a family that owned a store here, however, when the Alpha School (Natchitoches Parish) and Fairview School (Red River Parish) were combined in 1912, the new name came into use".

== Education ==
The community is served by the Natchitoches Parish School Board.

== Transportation ==
=== U.S. highways ===
U.S. 71
U.S. 84
