= Louisiana Highway 14 =

Highway in Louisiana

Louisiana Highway 14
- LA 14 in red, business routes in blue

Route information
- Maintained by Louisiana DOTD
- Length: 100.096 mi (161.089 km)
- Existed: 1955 renumbering–present
- Tourist routes: National Scenic Byway: Creole Nature Trail; Louisiana Scenic Byways: Flyway Byway, Cajun Corridor

Major junctions
- West end: US 90 / US 171 in Lake Charles
- I-210 in Lake Charles; LA 27 at Holmwood; LA 26 in Lake Arthur; LA 13 west of Kaplan; LA 35 in Kaplan; US 167 in Abbeville; Future I-49 / US 90 in New Iberia
- East end: LA 182 in New Iberia

Location
- Country: United States
- State: Louisiana
- Parishes: Calcasieu, Jefferson Davis, Vermilion, Cameron, Iberia

Highway system
- Louisiana State Highway System; Interstate; US; State; Scenic
← LA 13	→ LA 15
← SR 97	98	→ SR 99

Louisiana Highway 14 (LA 14) is a state highway located in southern Louisiana. It runs 100.10 miles (161.10 km) in an east–west direction from the junction of U.S. Highways 90 and 171 in Lake Charles to LA 182 in New Iberia.

The highway connects a string of small communities and cities in the Acadiana region of the state at a distance of roughly 20 to 25 miles (32 to 40 km) from the Gulf of Mexico. It connects three parish seats and traverses four parishes, briefly passing through the corner of a fifth. The majority of the route runs parallel and to the south of the busier Interstate 10 (I-10) and US 90 corridor. The biggest population centers are located on either end of the route with the intervening territory being largely rural. Apart from Lake Charles and New Iberia, LA 14 passes through the cities of Abbeville and Kaplan, as well as the towns of Lake Arthur, Gueydan, and Delcambre.

LA 14 marks the southern terminus of US 171 in Lake Charles. The highway also has interchanges with I-210 and US 90 in Lake Charles and New Iberia, respectively.

== Route description ==
=== Lake Charles to Abbeville ===
From the west, LA 14 begins at an intersection with US 90 (Fruge Street) and US 171 (North Martin Luther King Highway) in Lake Charles. This intersection, located directly east of the downtown area, also marks the southern terminus of US 171, which heads north toward DeRidder. Signs direct motorists to two nearby interchanges with I-10: north on US 171 for eastbound I-10 to Lafayette and west on US 90 for westbound I-10 to Beaumont, Texas. LA 14 travels south on South Martin Luther King Highway, an undivided four-lane commercial thoroughfare with a center turning lane. After several blocks, it intersects US 90 Bus. at Broad Street, and the local name changes to Gerstner Memorial Drive. 2 miles (3.2 km) later, LA 14 passes through a diamond interchange with I-210 (Exit 8), a southern bypass of Lake Charles. South of the interstate, the surroundings begin to take on a more rural character. An intersection with LA 3186 (East McNeese Street) provides a connection to nearby McNeese State University. Shortly after crossing the city limits, LA 14 intersects LA 3092 and turns east, becoming an undivided two-lane highway. Here, the directional banners for LA 14 change from north–south to east–west for the remainder of its journey. Over the next 21 miles (34 km), LA 14 zigzags through southeastern Calcasieu Parish along rural section line roads. During this stretch, the highway intersects LA 27 at a point known as Holmwood, connecting with Cameron on the Gulf of Mexico. LA 14 also passes through the tiny unincorporated communities of Bell City and Hayes. Between them is an intersection with LA 101, which heads north toward I-10 and US 90 at Lacassine. In Hayes, the highway turns south and crosses into Jefferson Davis Parish soon afterward.

Entering the southwestern corner of Jefferson Davis Parish, LA 14 turns to resume its eastward course and crosses a high-rise fixed span bridge (built in 2013 to replace an aging swing bridge) over the wide and serpentine Bayou Lacassine. Over the 12 miles (19 km) between the bridge and the town of Lake Arthur, LA 14 intersects two other state highways. The first is LA 99, which heads north to junctions with I-10 and US 90 in Welsh. The second is LA 3056, leading to the nearby Lacassine National Wildlife Refuge to the south. After curving to the northeast, LA 14 reaches a T-intersection with LA 380 along the northern border of Lake Arthur, a small town located on a body of water with the same name. The route turns south onto Iowa Avenue, running concurrent with LA 380, then east onto 8th Street to Arthur Avenue. From this intersection, through traffic may bypass the center of town by continuing straight ahead on LA 380 for a short distance to LA 26. LA 14 turns south onto Arthur Avenue then east onto 3rd Street to Calcasieu Avenue. Located at this intersection is the southern terminus of LA 26, connecting with I-10 and US 90 in Jennings. LA 14 turns southeast, continuing the route of LA 26 out of Lake Arthur. It then proceeds across a continuous beam bridge over the Mermentau River and into Vermilion Parish.

Just inside Vermilion Parish, LA 14 briefly passes through the northeastern corner of Cameron Parish. It then turns due east to re-enter Vermilion Parish, throughout which the route is generally designated as Veterans Memorial Drive. After 6 miles (9.7 km), LA 14 reaches the small town of Gueydan and an intersection with southbound LA 91. LA 14 turns north onto 1st Street, briefly running concurrent with LA 91 along the west end of town. After three blocks, LA 91 continues northward toward Morse while LA 14 turns east to follow Main Street, a divided four-lane thoroughfare, through Gueydan. On the east end of town, LA 14 narrows again to an undivided two-lane highway and proceeds to curve south then east along rural section line roads. Over the next 11 miles (18 km), the highway passes through points such as Wright and Mulvey, intersecting several minor state routes. Shortly after curving to the southeast, LA 14 intersects LA 13, connecting with I-10 and US 90 in Crowley, and widens to accommodate a center turning lane. The highway then immediately enters the city of Kaplan, serving as its principal east–west thoroughfare. Near the center of town is an intersection with LA 35 (Cushing Avenue), another connection to I-10 and US 90, this time in Rayne. LA 35 also heads south toward remote points along the Gulf of Mexico. Upon exiting Kaplan, LA 14 loses its center lane and proceeds due east through the tiny community of Nunez. 4 miles (6.4 km) later, the highway enters the city of Abbeville, the seat of Vermilion Parish.

=== Abbeville to New Iberia ===
Just inside the Abbeville city limits, LA 14 Bus. branches off of highway to head through the historic downtown area. The mainline route, West Summers Drive, proceeds straight ahead and widens to a four-lane highway with a center turning lane. After a short distance, the highway intersects US 167 (Park Avenue), which heads north toward Lafayette. It then crosses a wide vertical lift bridge over Bayou Vermilion, also known as the Vermilion River. Now passing to the north of the downtown area, LA 14 intersects LA 82 (North State Street), connecting with points south of town such as Perry and Intracoastal City. Passing through a mixed residential and commercial area, the highway intersects LA 338 and curves southeast to rejoin the business route. On the east end of town, LA 14 passes the Abbeville Chris Crusta Memorial Airport and intersects LA 3267 (South Airport Road), also signed as the LA 82 truck route.

As LA 14 approaches the town of Erath, the center lane gives way to a median, and the highway begins to parallel the Louisiana and Delta Railroad (LDRR) line. LA 14 proceeds to make a gentle curve around the north side of town while LA 14 Bus. branches off to follow Lastie Street through town along the rail line. Between the local roads Old Railroad Road and North Suire Street, a center turning lane briefly replaces the highway's median. Leaving Erath, an intersection with LA 339 connects the town with the Youngsville area south of Lafayette. The business route rejoins the mainline route, and LA 14 proceeds into the neighboring town of Delcambre. Here, the route intersects LA 89, another connection to Youngsville, and regains its center lane through the remainder of Delcambre. LA 14 crosses from Vermilion Parish into Iberia Parish midway through town. Leaving Delcambre, the route crosses a vertical lift bridge over the Delcambre Canal, also known as Bayou Carlin, and the surroundings become largely rural once more.

In Iberia Parish, LA 14 becomes a divided four-lane highway once more and curves to the northeast away from the rail line in an area known as Bob Acres. After 7 miles (11 km), LA 14 passes through an interchange with US 90 at Exit 128A, simultaneously entering the parish seat, the city of New Iberia. US 90 connects with Lafayette to the northwest and Morgan City to the southeast. Gaining a center turning lane for a final time, LA 14 proceeds east and intersects LA 83, connecting to Weeks Island. The highway continues through town on Center Street and intersects LA 674 (East Admiral Doyle Drive). LA 14 gradually narrows to two lanes as it approaches its eastern terminus at LA 182 opposite Bayou Teche. LA 182 follows a one-way pair along St. Peter and Main Streets, located two blocks apart.

=== Route classification and data ===
LA 14 is generally classified by the Louisiana Department of Transportation and Development (La DOTD) as an urban principal arterial within the cities of Lake Charles, Abbeville, and New Iberia. Otherwise, the route serves as a rural major collector west of Lake Arthur and as a rural or urban minor arterial east of Lake Arthur. Daily traffic volume in 2013 peaked at 29,200 vehicles in Lake Charles and 20,800 in New Iberia. The lowest figure reported was 1,040 vehicles in rural Jefferson Davis Parish.

The posted speed limit is 55 mph (90 km/h) in rural areas, usually reduced to between 35 mph (55 km/h) and 45 mph (70 km/h) through town.

The western portion of LA 14 from Lake Charles to south of Hayes is part of the Creole Nature Trail, a National Scenic Byway All-American Road. Two additional portions of LA 14 are included in the state-designated system of tourist routes known as the Louisiana Scenic Byways. The first spans from south of Hayes eastward to Lake Arthur and is part of the Flyway Byway. The second portion, running from Gueydan to Delcambre, makes up the entirety of the Cajun Corridor.

== History ==
=== Pre-1955 route numbering ===
In the original Louisiana Highway system in use between 1921 and 1955, the modern LA 14 was part of three separate routes.

==== Western and eastern sections ====
The section from Lake Charles to Holmwood was a small part of State Route 42. Route 42 followed the modern US 171 corridor from Lake Charles as far north as Mansfield in DeSoto Parish. South of Holmwood, it followed the current LA 27 south and west to Cameron on the Gulf of Mexico. The portion of Route 42 now followed by LA 14 remained the same during the pre-1955 era.

The eastern half of LA 14 from Lake Arthur to New Iberia was also part of a much longer pre-1955 route, State Route 25. It was the middle portion of a U-shaped route that also included the modern corridor of LA 26 to Oberlin on the west end and LA 31 to Opelousas on the east end. The portion of Route 25 now followed by LA 14 had some minor differences in the pre-1955 era. Southeast of the Mermentau River bridge at Lake Arthur, the highway made a jog at LA 717 east onto Cypress Point Road then south onto Clesmae Road to rejoin the present alignment. On the east side of Gueydan, the highway turned south from Main Street onto 13th Street, then east onto Maree Michel Road, and south onto Hair Road to rejoin the current alignment. This portion of the route was re-aligned by the time of the 1955 Louisiana Highway renumbering. Further east, the pre-1955 route generally followed the current business routes through Abbeville and Erath. Sharp turns have been smoothed out over several portions of the route, most notably in Iberia Parish, where short segments of the original route bypassed during the 1920s are now local roads known as Old LA 25 Road.

==== Middle section ====
State Route 98
- Location: Holmwood–Lake Arthur
- Length: 37.7 mi (60.7 km)
- Existed: 1921–1955

The intervening section of present-day LA 14 from Holmwood to Lake Arthur made up the majority of former State Route 98. It was created in 1921 by an act of the state legislature as one of the original 98 state highway routes.

Route No. 98. Beginning at an intersection of the Grand Lake Road in Calcasieu Parish at a point immediately North of the Cameron Parish line thence East along the Cameron-Calcasieu line to the Jefferson Davis Parish line thence continuing East along the Jefferson Davis-Cameron line to a point West of Lake Arthur thence in a northeasterly direction to the town of Lake Arthur.

— 1921 legislative route description

This route also extended south from Holmwood along LA 27 (former State Route 42), then west along current LA 397 and a local road to a dead end at the Gulf Intracoastal Waterway. As the route description indicates, Route 98 was projected to connect with the Grand Lake Road, LA 384 (former State Route 211), but this portion of the route was apparently not improved before being bisected by the Gulf Intracoastal Waterway in the 1930s. By the time of the 1955 renumbering, the western terminus had been truncated to the point where current LA 397 turns to the north.

The portion of Route 98 now followed by LA 14 remained the same during the pre-1955 era. It differed from the modern route only due to a small re-alignment between Holmwood and Bell City. The route originally turned south onto Lavoi Road through an area known as Rossignol then turned east onto Rossignol Road to rejoin the current alignment at Bell City.

=== Post-1955 route history ===
LA 14 was created in 1955 as a collective renumbering of the majority of former State Route 98, as well as portions of Routes 25 and 42.

Class "A": La 14—From a junction with La 13 at or near Kaplan through or near Abbeville to a junction with La-US 90 at or near New Iberia.
Class "B": La 14—From a junction with US 90 at or near Lake Charles through or near Holmwood, Lake Arthur and Guydan[sic] to a junction with La 13 at or near Kaplan.

— 1955 legislative route description

With the 1955 renumbering, the state highway department initially categorized all routes into three classes: "A" (primary), "B" (secondary), and "C" (farm-to-market). This system has since been updated and replaced by a more specific functional classification system.

Since the 1955 renumbering, the route of LA 14 has generally remained the same. Improvements to the route began with a minor re-alignment bypassing Rossignol in Calcasieu Parish around 1959. In 1963, the western terminus in Lake Charles was moved several blocks north from Broad Street to Fruge Street when US 90 was moved onto I-10 through the downtown area. Around 1964, the route southeast of the Mermentau River bridge at Lake Arthur was smoothed out. In about 1966, the four-lane bypass of Abbeville was opened, allowing truck and other through traffic to avoid having to navigate around both the Magdalen and Courthouse Squares as well as a narrow lift bridge across the Vermilion River. Around 1990, the portion of LA 14 between Delcambre and New Iberia was widened to four lanes. The portion of the route through Lake Charles followed soon afterward. In the late 1990s, the route between Abbeville and Delcambre was four-laned, necessitating a bypass of the main road through Erath. The original alignment has since been retained as a business route.

== Future ==
La DOTD is currently engaged in a program that aims to transfer about 5,000 miles (8,000 km) of state-owned roadways to local governments over the next several years. Under this plan of "right-sizing" the state highway system, the business routes of LA 14 through Abbeville and Erath are proposed for deletion as they do not meet a significant interurban travel function.

== Major intersections ==
Parish	Location	mi	km	Destinations	Notes
Calcasieu	Lake Charles	0.000– 0.041	0.000– 0.066	US 90 (Fruge Street) to I-10 west – Beaumont US 171 north (Martin L. King Highway) to I-10 east – DeRidder, Lafayette	Western terminus of LA 14; southern terminus of US 171
Calcasieu	Lake Charles	0.506	0.814	US 90 Bus. (Broad Street)	
Calcasieu	Lake Charles	1.256	2.021	LA 1138-3 east (Legion Street)	Western terminus of LA 1138-3
Calcasieu	Lake Charles	2.529– 2.665	4.070– 4.289	I-210 – Beaumont, Lafayette	Exit 8 on I-210
Calcasieu	Lake Charles	4.048	6.515	LA 3186 west (East McNeese Street)	Eastern terminus of LA 3186
Calcasieu		5.298	8.526	LA 3092 south (Tom Hebert Road)	Eastern terminus of LA 3092
Calcasieu		7.314	11.771	LA 397 south	West end of LA 397 concurrency
Calcasieu		8.356	13.448	LA 397 north to I-10	East end of LA 397 concurrency
Calcasieu	Holmwood	13.339	21.467	LA 27 south – Cameron	Southern terminus of LA 27 (signed as northern terminus)
Calcasieu	Hayes	23.371	37.612	LA 101 north – Lacassine	Southern terminus of LA 101
Jefferson Davis		28.828– 28.982	46.394– 46.642	Bridge over Bayou Lacassine	
Jefferson Davis		32.154	51.747	LA 99 north – Welsh	Southern terminus of LA 99
Jefferson Davis		35.222	56.684	LA 3056	Northern terminus of LA 3056; to Lacassine National Wildlife Refuge
Jefferson Davis	Lake Arthur	40.846	65.735	LA 380 west – Thornwell	West end of LA 380 concurrency
Jefferson Davis	Lake Arthur	41.255	66.393	LA 380 east (8th Street) – Jennings, Abbeville	East end of LA 380 concurrency
Jefferson Davis	Lake Arthur	42.571	68.511	LA 26 north (Calcasieu Avenue) – Jennings	Southern terminus of LA 26
Jefferson Davis–Vermilion parish line	Lake Arthur	43.241– 43.929	69.590– 70.697	Bridge over Mermentau River	
Vermilion		45.163	72.683	LA 717	Northern terminus of LA 717
Cameron		47.246	76.035	LA 717	Southern terminus of LA 717
Vermilion	Gueydan	54.834	88.247	LA 91 south – Florence	West end of LA 91 concurrency
Vermilion	Gueydan	55.137	88.734	LA 91 north (1st Street) – Morse, Midland	East end of LA 91 concurrency
Vermilion		59.318	95.463	LA 711	Northern terminus of LA 711
Vermilion	Wright	61.323	98.690	LA 712 (Wright Road)	Southern terminus of LA 712
Vermilion	Mulvey	62.327	100.306	LA 3093 (Meridian Line Road)	Northern terminus of LA 3093
Vermilion		68.493	110.229	LA 13 north – Crowley, Eunice	Southern terminus of LA 13
Vermilion	Kaplan	70.015	112.678	LA 35 (Cushing Avenue) – Indian Bayou, Pecan Island	
Vermilion	Nunez	73.718	118.638	LA 695	
Vermilion		76.260	122.729	LA 343 – Meaux, Leroy	Southern terminus of LA 343
Vermilion	Abbeville	77.773	125.164	LA 14 Bus. east (West Port Street)	Western terminus of LA 14 Bus.
Vermilion	Abbeville	78.751	126.737	US 167 (Park Avenue) – Lafayette	
Vermilion	Abbeville	78.845– 78.918	126.889– 127.006	Bridge over Bayou Vermilion (or Vermilion River)	
Vermilion	Abbeville	79.205	127.468	LA 82 (North State Street) – Perry, Intracoastal City LA 82 Truck begins	Northern terminus of LA 82 Truck; west end of LA 82 Truck concurrency
Vermilion	Abbeville	80.353	129.316	LA 338 (North John M. Hardy Drive, Lafitte Road)	
Vermilion	Abbeville	81.228	130.724	LA 14 Bus. west (Charity Street)	Eastern terminus of LA 14 Bus.
Vermilion	Abbeville	81.984	131.940	LA 3267 / LA 82 Truck south (South Airport Road)	Eastern terminus of LA 3267; east end of LA 82 Truck concurrency
Vermilion	Erath	84.048	135.262	LA 14 Bus. east	Western terminus of LA 14 Bus.
Vermilion	Erath	86.139	138.627	LA 339 – Youngsville, Lafayette	
Vermilion		86.538	139.269	LA 14 Bus. west	Eastern terminus of LA 14 Bus.
Vermilion	Delcambre	87.826	141.342	LA 89 north – Lozes, Youngsville	Southern terminus of LA 89
Iberia	Delcambre	88.371	142.219	LA 330 (North Railroad Street)	Eastern terminus of LA 330
Iberia	Delcambre	88.683– 88.724	142.721– 142.787	Bridge over Delcambre Canal (or Bayou Carlin)	
Iberia		95.095	153.041	LA 676 (Valery Road)	Eastern terminus of LA 676
Iberia	New Iberia	96.876– 97.112	155.907– 156.287	US 90 – Morgan City, Lafayette	Exit 128A on US 90
Iberia	New Iberia	97.792	157.381	LA 329 south (Avery Island Road) – Avery Island	Northern terminus of LA 329; location also known as Brannon
Iberia	New Iberia	98.114	157.899	LA 83 (Weeks Island Road) – Lydia, Weeks Island	Northern terminus of LA 83
Iberia	New Iberia	98.729	158.889	LA 674 (East Admiral Doyle Drive) – Jeanerette	
Iberia	New Iberia	99.973– 100.096	160.891– 161.089	LA 182 east (East St. Peter Street) – Jeanerette, Franklin LA 182 west (East Main Street) – Lafayette	Eastern terminus; one-way pair
1.000 mi = 1.609 km; 1.000 km = 0.621 mi: Concurrency terminus

== Auxiliary routes ==
=== Abbeville business route ===
Louisiana Highway 14 Business
- Location: Abbeville
- Length: 3.895 mi (6.268 km)
- Existed: 2013–present

Louisiana Highway 14 Business (LA 14 Bus.) runs 3.90 miles (6.28 km) in an east–west direction through Abbeville, a city in Vermilion Parish. The highway follows the original route of LA 14 through the downtown area, traversing a narrow two-lane vertical lift bridge across Bayou Vermilion and navigating around two town squares located only one block apart.

LA 14 Bus. branches off of mainline LA 14 (West Summers Drive) just inside the Abbeville city limits and travels along Port Street. Just before reaching Bayou Vermilion, also known as the Vermilion River, LA 14 Bus. intersects US 167 (Park Avenue) at the latter's southern terminus. It then crosses a vertical lift bridge over the bayou and into downtown Abbeville. Over the next several blocks, the route forms the northern border of the city's Historic District, passing many of its historic landmarks and government buildings. After briefly traveling along Pere Magret Street, the highway separates into a one-way pair around Magdalen Square, located between Washington and Jefferson Streets. It then travels for one block along Concord Street before separating again to travel around the courthouse square with east and westbound traffic following Peace and Tivoli Streets, respectively. The courthouse square also marks an intersection with LA 82, which follows the one-way pair of St. Charles and State Streets north toward Lafayette. To the south, State Street carries two-way traffic for southbound LA 82 toward Perry and Intracoastal City. LA 14 Bus. proceeds along Charity Street and gains a center turning lane. After passing LA 338 (North John M. Hardy Drive), the highway widens to four lanes with center lane intact. Several blocks later, LA 14 Bus. rejoins the mainline route just to the west of Abbeville Chris Crusta Memorial Airport.

LA 14 Bus. is classified as an urban principal arterial by the Louisiana Department of Transportation and Development (La DOTD). The average daily traffic in 2013 ranged from 2,800 to 10,600 vehicles compared to about double that number on the mainline route. The posted speed limit ranges from 35 mph (55 km/h) in the downtown area to 50 mph (80 km/h) further east.

Prior to 1955, the route was part of State Route 25. It became part of the original route of LA 14 with the 1955 Louisiana Highway renumbering and remained the principal east–west highway through Abbeville until the construction of the present route around the north side of town in the mid-1960s. The new route was originally designated as LA 14 Byp., while the old route was eventually signed in the field as LA 14 Bus. This designation became official in 2013 when the bypass designation was dropped from what is now the mainline route.

The entire highway is in Abbeville, Vermilion Parish.

mi	km	Destinations	Notes
0.000– 0.306	0.000– 0.492	LA 14 (West Summers Drive)	Western terminus
1.375	2.213	US 167 north (Park Avenue) – Lafayette	Southern terminus of US 167
1.426	2.295	LA 335 west	Eastern terminus of LA 335
1.506– 1.552	2.424– 2.498	Bridge over Bayou Vermilion (or Vermilion River)	
1.834– 1.918	2.952– 3.087	LA 82 north (North St. Charles Street, North State Street) – Lafayette LA 82 south (South State Street) – Perry, Intracoastal City	One-way pair on northbound LA 82
3.160	5.086	LA 338 (North John M. Hardy Drive)	Southern terminus of LA 338
3.895	6.268	LA 14 / LA 82 Truck (Veterans Memorial Drive)	Eastern terminus
1.000 mi = 1.609 km; 1.000 km = 0.621 mi

=== Erath business route ===
Louisiana Highway 14 Business
- Location: Erath
- Length: 2.420 mi (3.895 km)
- Existed: c. 1999–present

Louisiana Highway 14 Business (LA 14 Bus.) runs 2.42 miles (3.89 km) in an east–west direction through Erath, a town in Vermilion Parish. It follows the original route of LA 14 through Erath before the construction of a bypass just to the north during the late 1990s.

From the west, LA 14 Bus. begins at an intersection with LA 14 (Veterans Memorial Drive) at the western edge of town. It heads eastward on West Lastie Street along the Louisiana and Delta Railroad (LDRR) tracks. After crossing a bridge over a small waterway, the route passes through the commercial center of town and intersects two state highways located one block apart. They are LA 331 and LA 685, which both lead to rural areas south of town. At the eastern edge of Erath, LA 14 Bus. intersects LA 339, which heads north toward Youngsville. Shortly afterward, the highway reaches its eastern terminus as it reconnects with the mainline route.

LA 14 Bus. is an undivided two-lane highway for its entire length. It is classified as an urban minor arterial by the Louisiana Department of Transportation and Development (La DOTD). The average daily traffic volume in 2013 was reported as 4,500 vehicles. The posted speed limit is 45 mph (70 km/h).

Prior to 1955, the route was part of State Route 25. It became part of the original route of LA 14 with the 1955 Louisiana Highway renumbering and remained so until the late 1990s. At this time, a slight northern bypass of Erath was opened as part of a project to widen LA 14 to four lanes between Abbeville and Delcambre. The bypass was opposed by many officials and residents of Erath who feared that it would be detrimental to the businesses in the town. However, the state highway department claimed it was necessary because the highway's proximity to the parallel rail line would not allow for a four-lane corridor. Upon its completion, the bypass was designated as the mainline route of LA 14 with the original route retained in the state highway system as a business route.

The entire highway is in Vermilion Parish.

Location	mi	km	Destinations	Notes
Erath	0.000	0.000	LA 14 (Veterans Memorial Drive) – Abbeville, New Iberia	Western terminus
Erath	1.318	2.121	LA 331 (South Kibbe Street) – Boston, Henry	Northern terminus of LA 331
Erath	1.405	2.261	LA 685 (South Broadway Street)	Northern terminus of LA 685
Erath	2.119	3.410	LA 339 – Youngsville, Lafayette	Southern terminus of LA 339
	2.420	3.895	LA 14 (Veterans Memorial Drive) – Abbeville, New Iberia	Eastern terminus
1.000 mi = 1.609 km; 1.000 km = 0.621 mi

=== Abbeville bypass route ===
Louisiana Highway 14 Bypass
- Location: Abbeville
- Length: 3.450 mi (5.552 km)
- Existed: c. 1966–2013

Louisiana Highway 14 Bypass (LA 14 Byp.) ran 3.45 miles (5.55 km) in an east–west direction through Abbeville, a city in Vermilion Parish. The highway provided a bypass of the downtown area for truck traffic and other through traffic prior to being signed as the mainline route in 2013. The former mainline route, now signed as a business route, traverses a narrow two-lane vertical lift bridge across Bayou Vermilion. It then navigates around two town squares located only one block apart. The bypass was constructed in the mid-1960s to alleviate traffic through the downtown area, but it has since been blamed as a factor in its decline.

From the west, LA 14 Byp. began at an intersection with its parent route on the west side of Abbeville. It headed east, almost immediately widening from an undivided two-lane highway to a four-lane highway with a center turning lane. After a short distance, the highway intersected US 167 (Park Avenue), which heads north toward Lafayette. It then crossed a wide vertical lift bridge over Bayou Vermilion, also known as the Vermilion River. Now passing to the north of the downtown area, LA 14 Byp. intersected LA 82 (North State Street), connecting with points south of town such as Perry and Intracoastal City. Passing through a mixed residential and commercial area, the highway intersected LA 338 and curved southeast to reconnect with the mainline route on the east side of town.

LA 14 Byp. was classified as an urban principal arterial by the Louisiana Department of Transportation and Development (La DOTD). The average daily traffic in 2013 ranged from 9,000 to 20,700 vehicles compared to about half that number on the mainline (now business) route. The posted speed limit was 45 mph (70 km/h).

The entire highway was in Abbeville, Vermilion Parish.

mi	km	Destinations	Notes
0.000	0.000	LA 14 west (West Summers Drive) – Kaplan, Gueydan LA 14 east (Port Street)	Western terminus
0.977	1.572	US 167 (Park Avenue) – Lafayette	
1.071– 1.145	1.724– 1.843	Bridge over Bayou Vermilion (or Vermilion River)	
1.431	2.303	LA 82 (North State Street) – Perry, Intracoastal City LA 82 Truck begins	Northern terminus of LA 82 Truck; west end of LA 82 Truck concurrency
2.579	4.150	LA 338 (North John M. Hardy Drive, Lafitte Road)	
3.450	5.552	LA 14 west (Charity Street) LA 14 east / LA 82 Truck south (Veterans Memorial Drive) – Delcambre, New Iberia	Eastern terminus; east end of LA 82 Truck concurrency
1.000 mi = 1.609 km; 1.000 km = 0.621 mi: Concurrency terminus
