= Louisiana Highway 82 =

State highway in Louisiana, United States

Louisiana Highway 82

- Route of LA 82 highlighted in red

Route information
- Maintained by Louisiana DOTD
- Length: 142.87 mi (229.93 km)
- Existed: 1955 renumbering–present
- Tourist routes: National Scenic Byway: Creole Nature Trail

Major junctions
- West end: SH 82 at Texas state line east of Port Arthur, TX
- LA 27 in Holly Beach; LA 27 in Creole; LA 35 north of Forked Island; LA 14 in Abbeville
- East end: LA 339 southwest of Youngsville

Location
- Country: United States
- State: Louisiana
- Parishes: Cameron, Vermilion

Highway system
- Louisiana State Highway System; Interstate; US; State; Scenic
← LA 81	→ LA 83
← SR 291	292	→ SR 293

Louisiana Highway 82 (LA 82) is a state highway located in southern Louisiana. It runs 142.87 miles (229.93 km) in a general east–west direction from the Texas state line east of Port Arthur to the Vermilion–Lafayette parish line southwest of Youngsville.

The route parallels the coastline of the Gulf of Mexico for the majority of its length. On its eastern end, LA 82 becomes a north–south route as it turns away from the coast toward the Vermilion Parish city of Abbeville, located along LA 14. Connections are made here to the U.S. Highway 90 (US 90) corridor along Bayou Teche as well as the Lafayette metropolitan area via US 167.

LA 82 serves as a vital route for both the area's oil and gas as well as seafood and fishing industries. It is also the only east–west route spanning the coastal portions of Cameron and Vermilion parishes. This sparsely populated area in the southwestern part of the state contains a string of small settlements and communities located along natural ridges in the vast marshland, known locally as cheniers. LA 82 connects several of these cheniers, allowing them access to the cities of Port Arthur on the west and Abbeville on the northeast. The only other land-based routes to the area are via LA 27, which loops around Calcasieu Lake providing an important connection to Lake Charles, the largest city in southwestern Louisiana. LA 82 also passes through Cameron, the seat of Cameron Parish, where it runs concurrent with LA 27 for several miles. LA 82 and the communities along its path have survived despite their vulnerability to storm surge, which caused extensive damage most recently by Hurricanes Rita and Ike.

The highway passes through a wide variety of surroundings. Besides the coastal marshes, LA 82 traverses inland prairies, rural farmland, and the longest stretch of sandy beach in the state. Several navigable waterways and industrial channels are encountered along the way, including the Gulf Intracoastal Waterway. Four are crossed by way of movable bridges and another, Calcasieu Pass, is crossed at Cameron by toll ferry. The area's distinctive abundance of wildlife is reflected in the highway's designation through Cameron Parish as part of the Creole Nature Trail, an All-American Road in the National Scenic Byways Program.

== Route description ==
=== Sabine Lake to Cameron ===
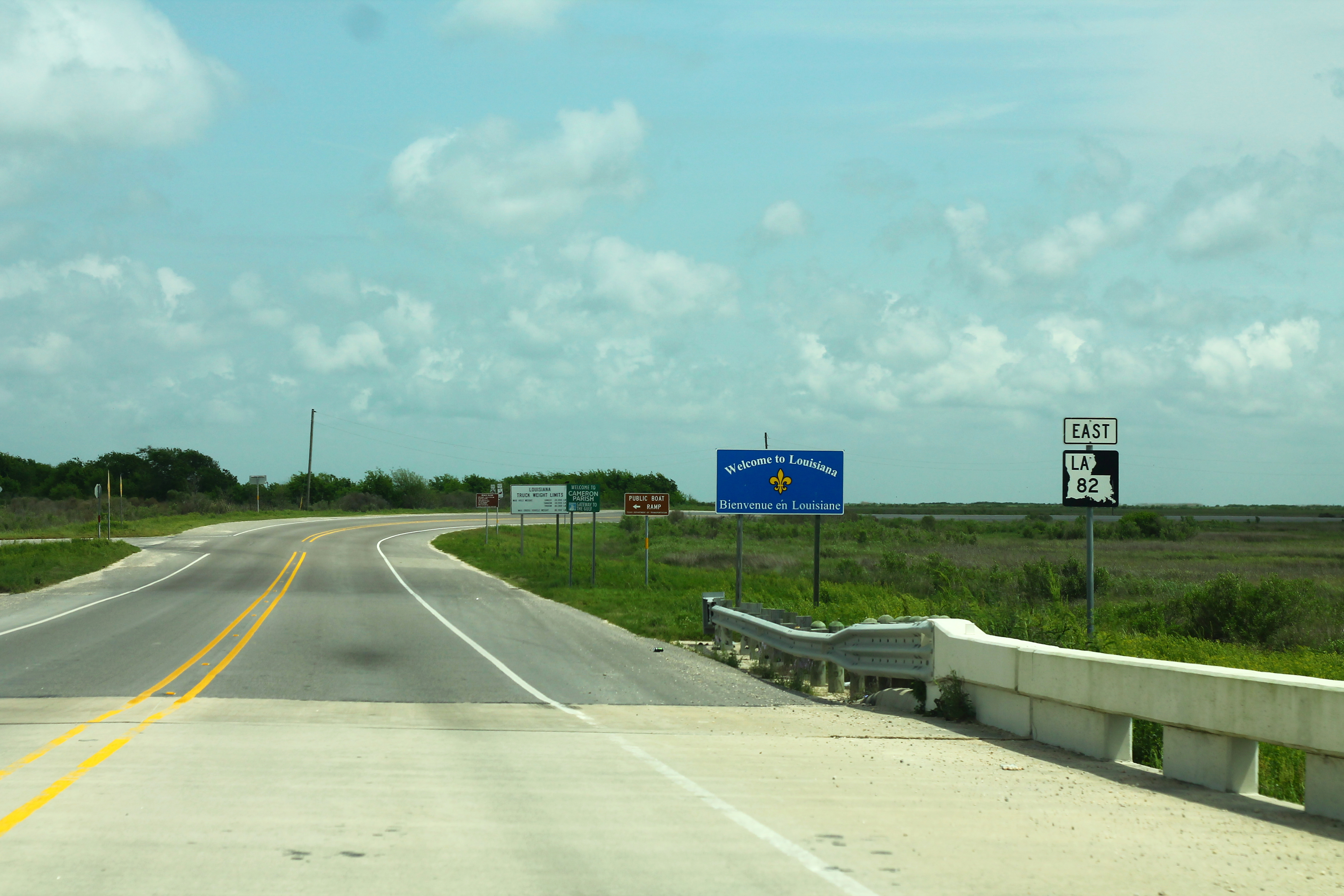
Start of Louisiana Highway 82 while crossing Sabine Lake.

From the west, LA 82 begins at the Texas state line continuing the route of Texas State Highway 82 (SH 82) midway across a bridge over Sabine Lake. The bridge connects Jefferson County, Texas and Cameron Parish, Louisiana just offshore of the city limits of Port Arthur, Texas near the Gulf of Mexico. Heading northeast off of the bridge, LA 82 (co-signed as the Creole Nature Trail) immediately curves to the southeast and passes the Chevron Sabine Gas Plant and Cheniere Energy liquefied natural gas facility located on the Sabine Pass. The highway then curves to the east and heads through the desolate marshes of Cameron Parish initially along an artificial embankment flanked by drainage canals. As the highway begins to approach the coastline of the Gulf of Mexico, however, it transitions onto the Blue Buck Ridge, a narrow strip of natural dry land. A few homes begin to dot the landscape, most of which are raised on piers and set back a distance from the road.

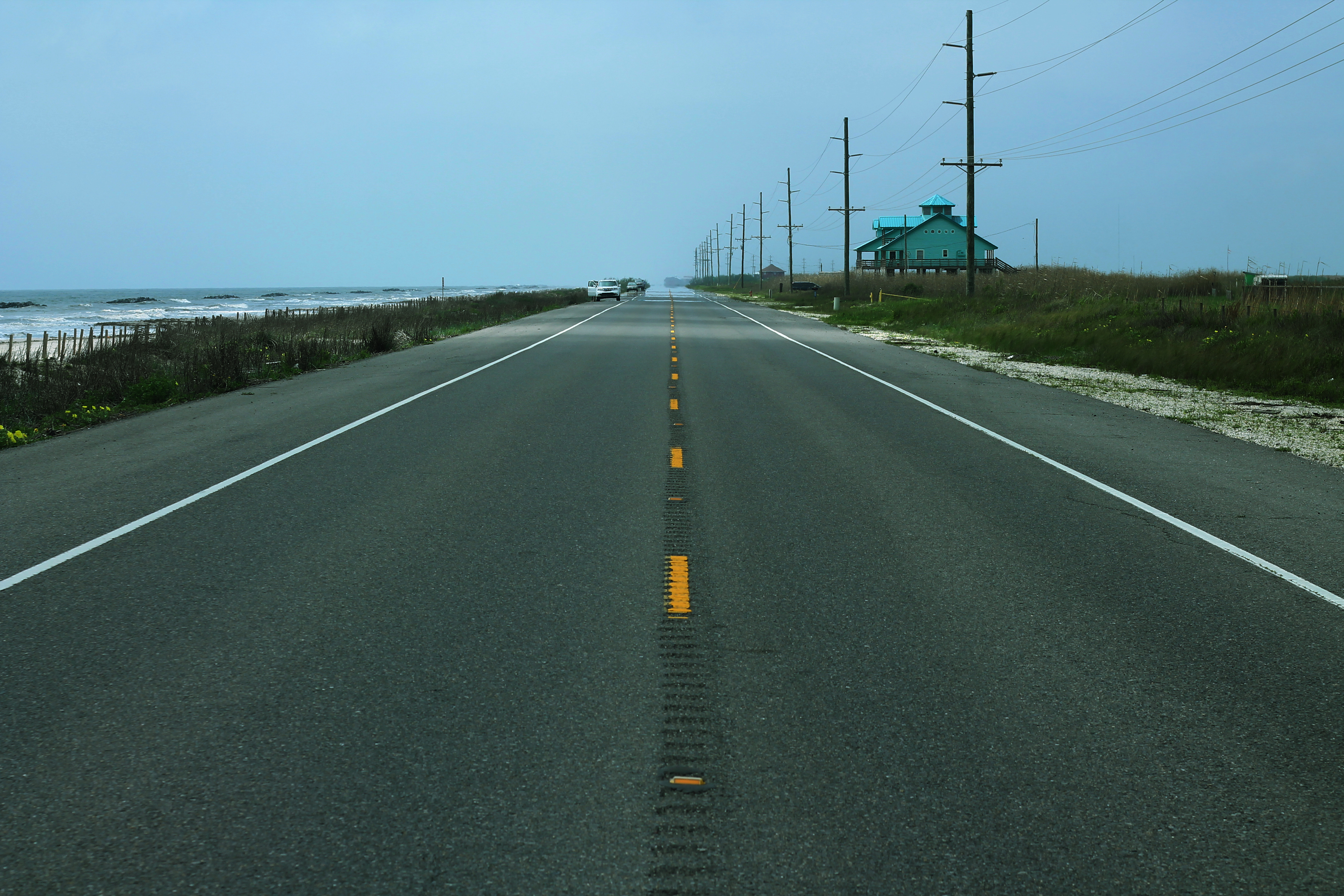
Center line of Louisiana Highway 82 alongside the Gulf of Mexico, near Holly Beach.

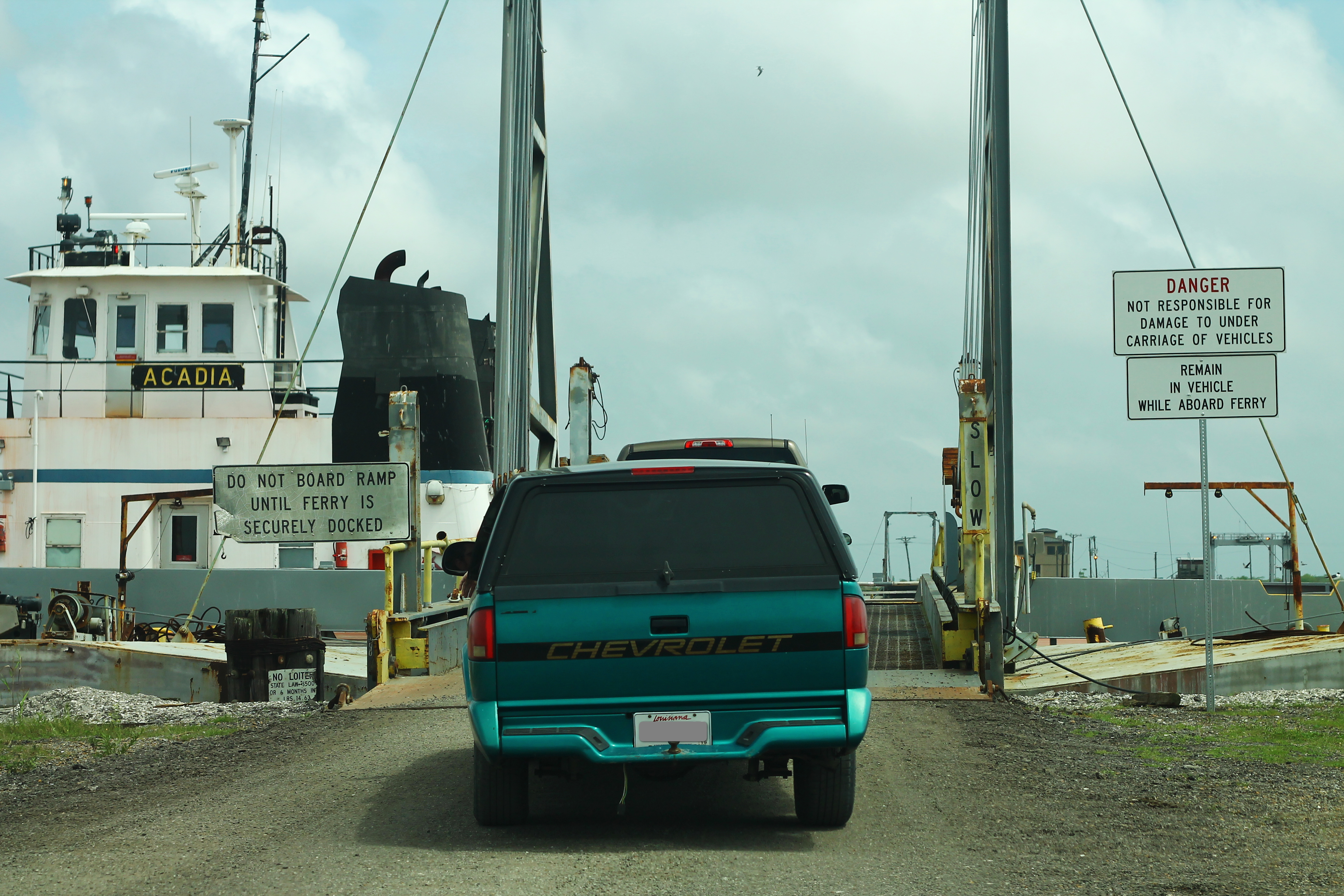
Boarding the LaDOTD Acadia Ferry, which is used for crossing the Calcasieu Ship Channel on Louisiana Highway 82.

Passing through the small community of Johnson Bayou, located about 14 miles (23 km) from the Sabine Lake bridge, LA 82 becomes known as the Gulf Beach Highway. The sandy beaches of the gulf coast come into view approximately 6 miles (9.7 km) east of Johnson Bayou in an area known as Constance Beach. LA 82 proceeds eastward flanked by the beach and the uninhabited marsh for another 6 miles (9.7 km) before curving into a T-intersection with LA 27 at Holly Beach. This leg of LA 27 heads north to Sulphur outside the larger city of Lake Charles and provides one of only two inland connections from the Cameron Parish gulf coast. LA 82 turns to resume its eastward course as it runs concurrently with LA 27 past the cluster of raised waterfront homes comprising Holly Beach. After 5 miles (8.0 km), the highway curves to the northeast away from the coastline and then due north alongside the Calcasieu Ship Channel. 2 miles (3.2 km) later, the road curves east to cross the channel via ferry. The Cameron Ferry charges $1 per vehicle and 25 cents per bicycle or pedestrian.

=== Cameron to Grand Chenier ===
After crossing the channel, the highway enters Cameron, the unincorporated parish seat and largest community in the sparsely populated parish. Heading through town on Marshall Street, the road parallels the Calcasieu Pass for a short distance. An unmarked intersection with LA 1141 once connected with a ferry across the pass to the now largely abandoned Monkey Island. LA 27 and LA 82 proceed through Cameron, passing its local government offices and commercial services. An intersection with LA 1142 (Beach Road) leads south to an area along the shoreline. The east side of town consists of intermittent residential development along a natural ridge set back from the beach. Upon leaving Cameron, the highway turns north onto the first of several short zigzags as it begins to take a general northeast course toward Creole. This portion of the route is signed as an alternate route of the Creole Nature Trail. Signs direct travelers straight ahead onto Trosclair Road, a more direct local road, to follow the preferred route.

About 8.5 miles (13.7 km) later, the highway reaches Creole, a four-way junction where LA 27 turns back to the north, providing the second and last connection to the Lake Charles area. Signs also direct travelers to follow LA 27 to reach the Cameron Prairie National Wildlife Refuge. From this intersection, LA 1143 (a state-maintained local road) heads east while LA 82 turns due south toward the coastline. After 2 miles (3.2 km), LA 82 turns east again at Oak Grove, the location of the region's high school as well as the Catfish Point Control Structure, a saltwater intrusion barrier. 6 miles (9.7 km) east of Oak Grove, LA 82 crosses a swing bridge over the Mermentau River into Grand Chenier. The highway travels along a grassy ridge ("chenier") through the community, which consists of a string of homes on the north side of the road that are interspersed with large oak trees. After 12 miles (19 km), LA 82 passes the entrance to the Rockefeller Wildlife Refuge, located on the south side of the highway. As LA 82 nears the end of the Grand Chenier ridge, it passes through two sparsely populated areas known as Tiger Island and North Island.

=== Coastal Vermilion Parish ===
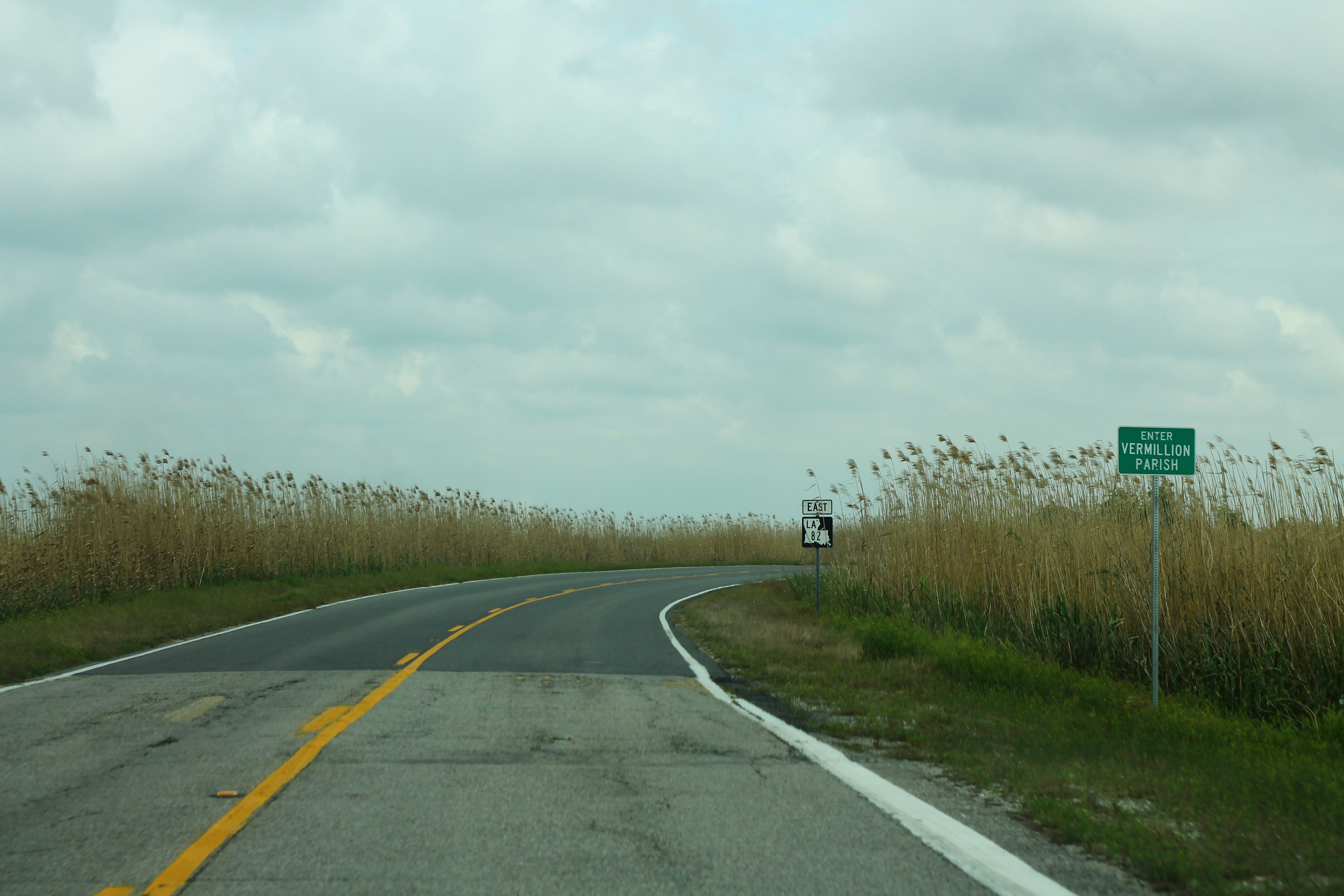
Eastbound between Vermilion Parish and Cameron Parish.

Continuing through the desolate marsh, LA 82 crosses the Superior Canal by way of a second swing bridge. After crossing from Cameron Parish into Vermilion Parish, LA 82 continues through the marsh for about 7 miles (11 km) before reaching another populated chenier known as Pecan Island, located between the coastline and the large White Lake. In the center of this community, which has homes on either side of the highway, the ridge divides into a front and back ridge. LA 82 curves due east to follow the latter, which is farther from the gulf. After 5 miles (8.0 km), the highway curves to the north and merges with LA 3147, a gravel route connecting to a remote location on the coastline known as Freshwater City. The directional signage for LA 82, when utilized, changes here from east–west to north–south for the remainder of the route. Proceeding northward, LA 82 once again travels atop a man-made embankment through the marsh for about 6.5 miles (10.5 km) before crossing a third swing bridge over the Schooner Bayou Canal, also known as the Old Intracoastal Canal.

LA 82 proceeds northward along Little Prairie Ridge for about 7.5 miles (12.1 km) to an area known as Forked Island. Here, the highway crosses a high-level fixed bridge over the Gulf Intracoastal Waterway. Shortly afterward, LA 82 reaches a T-intersection with LA 35, which heads north to the city of Kaplan. LA 82 turns east at this intersection and proceeds for about 7.5 miles (12.1 km) through an area of farmland mixed with light residential development. It then reaches another T-intersection in the small community of Esther. From this intersection, LA 333 heads south to Intracoastal City located on the canal of the same name. LA 82 turns north and travels for 7 miles (11 km) toward Perry, located on the Vermilion River just south of Abbeville. On the way, the highway intersects LA 690, which provides access to the nearby Palmetto Island State Park. LA 82 follows Elm Street through the three block-long community of Perry then crosses the Vermilion River by way of a vertical lift bridge. It then curves eastward briefly onto Perry Drive and into the suburban outskirts of Abbeville. At a T-intersection with LA 330, LA 82 turns north and immediately intersects LA 3267 (Jacqulyn Street). LA 3267 is signed as the truck route of LA 82 around the southeast side of Abbeville. It allows through traffic to bypass the city to connect with LA 14, leading to Delcambre and New Iberia.

=== Abbeville to Lafayette Parish line ===
LA 82 crosses the Abbeville city limits just north of LA 3267 and follows South State Street toward the center of town. The roadway gains a center turning lane for the few blocks between 5th Street and Railroad Avenue. Entering the city's downtown Historic District, the route passes a series of historic storefronts and municipal buildings. LA 82 intersects LA 14 Bus. at the southwest corner of the courthouse square. From the west, LA 14 Bus. follows Concord Street to the square then divides onto the one-way pair of Peace and Tivoli Streets around the square before combining again to proceed east on Charity Street. LA 82 also divides to navigate the square, becoming a divided four-lane highway as northbound traffic makes a jog from State Street onto the parallel St. Charles Street. This one-way pair lasts for four blocks through the residential neighborhood north of the square. North St. Charles Street then merges back onto North State Street, which becomes an undivided four-lane thoroughfare. A few blocks later, LA 82 intersects LA 14 (Veterans Memorial Drive), a four-lane highway that contains most of the city's commercial services. Just west on LA 14 across the Vermilion River is an intersection with US 167, the main route to Lafayette.

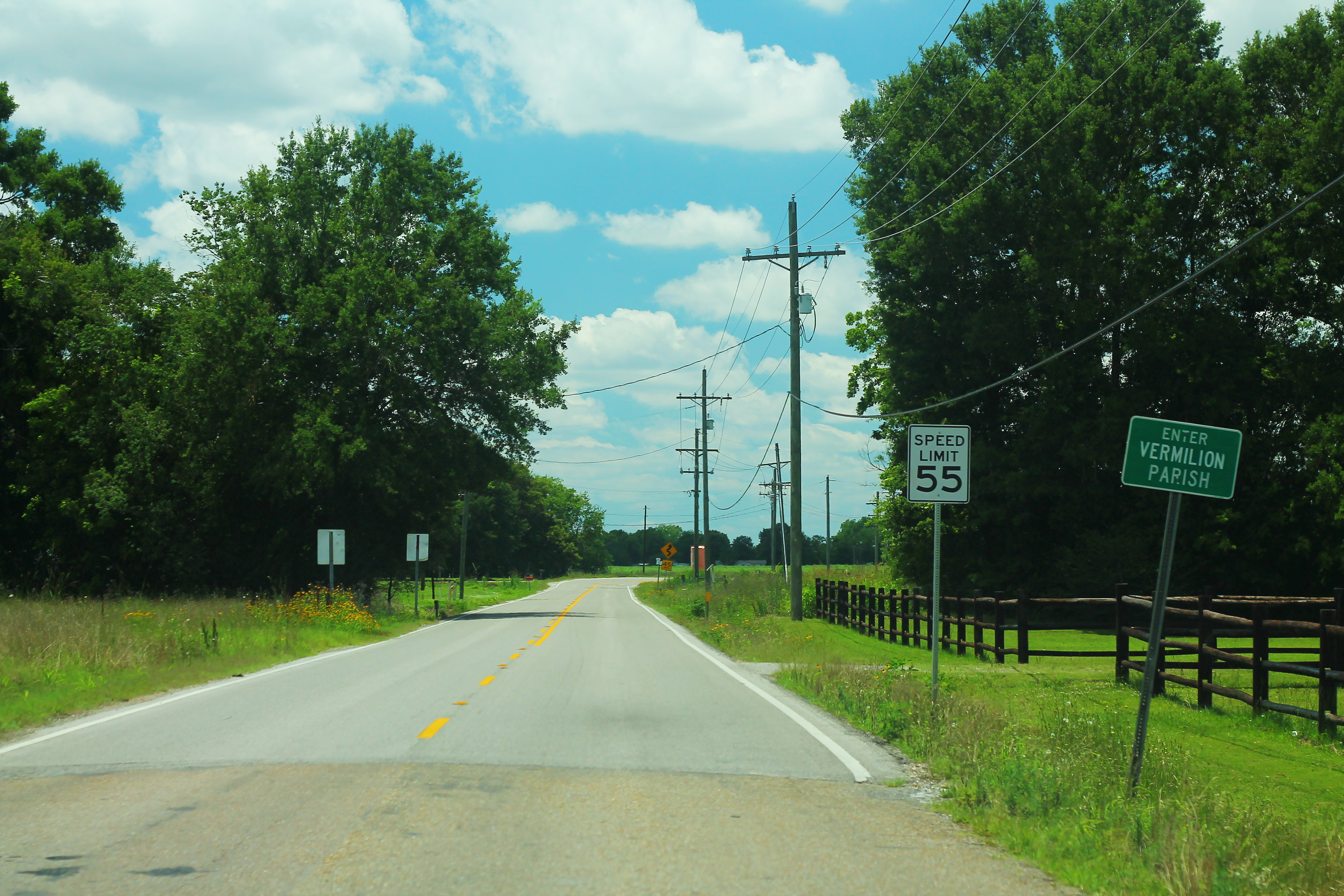
Westbound at the eastern terminus of Louisiana Highway 82 between Vermilion and Lafayette Parishes.

LA 82 proceeds across LA 14, narrowing to a two-lane highway once again, and exits the Abbeville city limits. The route begins to parallel the Vermilion River (also known as Bayou Vermilion) in a general northeast direction as the surrounding area takes on a mostly rural character. After 8 miles (13 km), the highway reaches a T-intersection with Lulu Road where a swing bridge signed as LA 1246 crosses the river immediately to the west. The route turns east and proceeds for another 2 miles (3.2 km) to the Lafayette Parish line where state maintenance and the LA 82 designation officially end. Local roads carry traffic for the short distance between there and LA 339, which connects to Youngsville and other areas of urban sprawl south of nearby Lafayette.

=== Route classification and data ===
The majority of LA 82 is classified as a rural major collector by the Louisiana Department of Transportation and Development (La DOTD). On its east end, it becomes an urban minor arterial in Perry and an urban principal arterial through Abbeville. The remainder of the route beyond Abbeville is classified as a rural local road. Daily traffic volume in 2013 averaged between 1,360 and 2,000 vehicles over most of the route. This figure doubles on the portion carrying traffic between Abbeville and Intracoastal City, ultimately reaching a peak of 9,300 vehicles per day through downtown Abbeville. The lowest figure reported was 1,060 vehicles through the Pecan Island area.

LA 82 is an undivided two-lane highway except the brief portion between LA 14 Bus. and mainline LA 14 in Abbeville. The posted speed limit is generally 55 mph (90 km/h) but is reduced as low as 25 mph (40 km/h) in Cameron and 35 mph (55 km/h) in Abbeville.

The entirety of LA 82 within Cameron Parish is part of the Creole Nature Trail, which is designated as a National Scenic Byway All-American Road.

== History ==
=== Pre-1955 route numbering ===
State Route 292
- Location: Sabine Lake–Esther
- Length: 104.6 mi (168.3 km)
- Existed: 1928–1955

In the original Louisiana Highway system in use between 1921 and 1955, the majority of present-day LA 82 from the Sabine River bridge to Esther was originally designated as State Route 292. It was added to the state highway system in 1928 by an act of the state legislature.

Route 292. Connecting the southern terminus of State Highway Routes No. 26 and 43 at or near the Intracoastal Canal, and from the joint terminus extending the highway southward to the Gulf of Mexico, and from that point westward through Pecan Island, Grand Chenier and Leesburg, thence in a westerly direction through Johnson Bayou Settlement to the Texas line at a point on Sabine Lake to intersect the proposed causeway from Port Arthur, Texas, over said Sabine Lake.

— 1928 legislative route description

When the numbered state highway system was created in 1921, there was no east–west highway route through Cameron and Vermilion parishes south of the present LA 14 corridor. There was only the southern loop around Calcasieu Lake through Cameron and Creole that is now part of LA 27. This highway was still under construction in 1928 when Route 292 was created. The addition of Route 292, projected to follow the gulf coast through the entire southwestern portion of the state, would open up much of Cameron Parish to automobile travel. As the route description indicates, the highway was also projected to extend inland from the Gulf of Mexico to connect with existing north–south highways (pre-1955 State Routes 26 and 43) running to the Vermilion Parish cities of Kaplan and Abbeville. The route to Abbeville would also be incorporated into the modern LA 82 in the 1955 Louisiana Highway renumbering while the route to Kaplan would become part of LA 35.

==== Planning and early construction ====
When Route 292 was created in 1928, it almost entirely existed on paper only. The small communities along its path were located along natural ridges in the marsh locally known as "cheniers." (Note: The spelling varies between "chenier" and "cheniere" in both regular usage and in place names.) Some of these ridges existed right along the shore of the Gulf of Mexico while others were set back in the marsh as remnants of the changing shoreline at various points in history. These narrow linear islands in the marsh would have to be connected by long stretches of man-made roadway embankment to create a continuous route through the area. Additionally, a number of waterways would have to be crossed by either bridge or ferry. After three decades of construction and improvement, a continuous surfaced route was finally achieved between 1958 and 1960.

The first improvements were made to the aforementioned section through Cameron, which is called by its original name of Leesburg in the official route description. It consisted of metalling (gravel surfacing) the southern portion of State Route 104, a federal aid route which provided the parish seat with its first highway connection to what was essentially the mainland. Route 104 followed what is now the western leg of LA 27 south from Sulphur in neighboring Calcasieu Parish and around the west side of Calcasieu and Mud Lakes to the gulf coast at Holly Beach. It then turned east to Cameron, running concurrent with the future Route 292. This work was completed by 1930. Then, as now, a ferry service provided the necessary crossing at Calcasieu Pass.

By the following year, the gravel road had been extended east from Cameron to Creole and then southeast through Grand Chenier to the end of the ridge near Tiger Island. The Mermentau River was crossed by ferry at Grand Chenier until a bridge was constructed in the late 1940s. The section of Route 292 between Cameron and Creole was concurrent with State Route 42, which was projected to turn north from Creole to provide a second connection to Calcasieu Parish. However, this road, which is now the eastern leg of LA 27, would not be completed until the end of the decade. West of Cameron, the gravel road was extended from Holly Beach along the ridge containing the settlement of Johnson Bayou around 1936. The dirt embankment for the remainder of the distance west of Johnson Bayou existed by this time, but it was not surfaced until the mid-1950s when the planned bridge across the Sabine Lake at the Texas state line was finally placed under construction.

==== Vermilion Parish construction ====
In Vermilion Parish where much of the route was projected through uninhabited marshland, the highway developed more slowly and in several disconnected segments. A gravel road traversing the Pecan Island ridge was completed by 1937. From there, the highway was slated to proceed eastward for a distance to a T-intersection with a north–south road. The southern leg of this road would travel toward the gulf on an alignment east of the present LA 3147, connecting with Chenier Au Tigre. This was a small settlement located on a ridge that jutted in from the beach and contained a popular health resort prior to World War II. The northern leg would traverse the marsh midway between White Lake and Vermilion Bay to connect with Routes 26 and 43, the main highways to Kaplan and Abbeville, respectively.

The nature and location of this junction changed several times during its planning stages. When ultimately constructed around 1952, the alignment of the gravel road was shifted closer to White Lake and connected with Route 26 via Forked Island. An existing gravel road between this junction and Esther built around 1931 provided the necessary connection with Route 43. A direct connection to Route 43 through Intracoastal City was planned but never built. The spur to Chenier Au Tigre also never came to fruition. A gravel road traversing the chenier was constructed in the mid-1930s, but it was never connected with the rest of Route 292. (Note: The disconnected road segment was designated on departmental maps as Route 292-E until its elimination from the state highway system prior to the 1955 renumbering.) Both it and the direct connection to Intracoastal City disappeared from highway maps during the following decade. The settlement of Chenier Au Tigre is now mostly abandoned. The final gap in Route 292, located on either side of the parish line between Grand Chenier and Pecan Island, would not be closed until after the 1955 renumbering.

==== Later improvements ====
Later improvements included the paving of the stretch between Cameron and the gap east of Grand Chenier during the late 1940s. A movable bridge was constructed across the Gulf Intracoastal Waterway at Forked Island by 1955, replacing a ferry service at that location. The only alignment change to Route 292 occurred shortly before the 1955 renumbering. The Calcasieu Ship Channel was cut across the route in the mid-1940s in order to bypass a sharp bend in the Calcasieu Pass at Cameron. This created what became known as Monkey Island and made a second ferry crossing necessary for auto traffic heading into Cameron. The situation was remedied around 1954 when the highway was re-routed to cross the pass at its present location. The original alignment traversing Monkey Island remains in the state highway system today as LA 1141.

==== Esther to Lafayette Parish line ====
The portion of LA 82 from Esther to Abbeville was a small part of State Route 43 in the pre-1955 system. It was created in 1921 by an act of the state legislature as one of the original 98 state highway routes. Route 43 also followed the US 167 corridor northward from Abbeville to Lafayette. From Lafayette, it headed northeast along the modern route of LA 94 to Breaux Bridge. On its south end, Route 43 also followed the present LA 333 from Esther through Intracoastal City. The portion of the route now followed by LA 82 was gravel surfaced in the late 1920s. Paving was completed between Perry and Abbeville around 1946 and between Esther and Perry shortly before the 1955 renumbering. The route remained largely the same during the pre-1955 era other than a sharp zigzag that was smoothed out just north of Little Bayou during the early 1930s. However, the highway crossed the Vermilion River in Perry at a different location just downstream from the present span. The original movable span was reached by turning east onto Main Street and connected with Orange Drive on the opposite bank.

The remainder of LA 82 north of Abbeville was not part of the pre-1955 state highway system.

=== Post-1955 route history ===
LA 82 was created in 1955 as a collective renumbering of State Route 292 and a portion of State Route 43. A single route designation now carried the gulf coast highway into Abbeville on its east end.

La 82—From the Texas State Line at or near Sabine Pass easterly to a junction with La 27 at or near Holly Beach and from a junction with La 27 at or near Creole through or near Pecan Island, Forked Island and Esther to a junction with La 14 at or near Abbeville.

— 1955 legislative route description

Shortly after the 1955 renumbering, the LA 82 designation was extended north from Abbeville along a former local road on the east bank of the Vermilion River to the Lafayette Parish line. Near the end of the decade, the last gaps in the route between Port Arthur, Texas and Abbeville were finally closed after three decades of planning. A swing bridge across the Sabine Lake at the state line was completed in 1958, and a gravel road connecting Grand Chenier and Pecan Island was completed soon afterward. Other improvements during this time include the construction of two more movable bridges along the route, beginning with a swing bridge across the Superior Canal east of Grand Chenier in 1956. The Mermentau River bridge at Grand Chenier was also replaced with the current span in 1959.

Paving of the route continued after the 1955 renumbering, extending south from Forked Island and west from Cameron. Most of the work was completed by the mid-1960s. The route on the east side of Pecan Island was shortened slightly by following the back ridge rather than the established road along the front ridge. The last section of gravel road, located between Grand Chenier and Pecan Island, was hard surfaced around 1967. The last ferry service on the Vermilion Parish portion of the highway was discontinued when a bridge was completed across the Schooner Bayou Canal (or Old Intracoastal Waterway) in 1965. In 1976, the original movable bridge across the Intracoastal Waterway at Forked Island was replaced with the current high-level fixed span. The location of the new bridge also allowed the straightening of the route through the area. The most recent bridge replacement occurred in 2009 when a new fixed bridge was built spanning the Sabine Lake at the state line. The original swing bridge had been damaged by Hurricanes Rita and Ike and was replaced with the help of federal relief funds.

== Future ==
La DOTD is currently engaged in a program that aims to transfer about 5,000 miles (8,000 km) of state-owned roadways to local governments over the next several years. Under this plan of "right-sizing" the state highway system, the portion of LA 82 north of Abbeville is proposed for elimination as it does not meet a significant interurban travel function. Additionally, the portion of the route between Cameron and Creole is planned to be swapped with Trosclair Road, a parallel local road.

== Major intersections ==
Parish	Location	mi	km	Destinations	Notes
Cameron		0.0	0.0	SH 82 west – Port Arthur	Western terminus; continuation in Texas
Cameron		0.0– 0.3	0.0– 0.48	Bridge over Sabine River	
Cameron	Holly Beach	26.2	42.2	LA 27 north – Sulphur	West end of LA 27 concurrency
Cameron	Cameron	35.2– 35.5	56.6– 57.1	Cameron Ferry across Calcasieu Ship Channel (tolled)	
Cameron	Cameron	36.6	58.9	LA 1141	Northern terminus of LA 1141 (unsigned)
Cameron	Cameron	38.3	61.6	LA 1142 south (Beach Road)	Northern terminus of LA 1142
Cameron	Creole	50.8	81.8	LA 27 north – Lake Charles LA 1143 east (East Creole Highway)	East end of LA 27 concurrency; western terminus of LA 1143; to Cameron Prairie National Wildlife Refuge via LA 27 north
Cameron	Grand Chenier	59.0– 59.2	95.0– 95.3	Bridge over Mermentau River	
Cameron		79.9	128.6	Bridge over Superior Canal	
Vermilion		99.0	159.3	LA 3147 – Fresh Water City	Northern terminus of LA 3147
Vermilion		105.9	170.4	Bridge over Schooner Bayou Canal	
Vermilion	Forked Island	113.3– 114.0	182.3– 183.5	Bridge over Gulf Intracoastal Waterway	
Vermilion		114.4	184.1	LA 35 north – Kaplan	Southern terminus of LA 35
Vermilion	Esther	122.0	196.3	LA 333 – Intracoastal City	Northern terminus of LA 333
Vermilion		125.2	201.5	LA 690	Western terminus of LA 690
Vermilion	Perry	129.4	208.2	LA 694 (Hare Street)	Northern terminus of LA 694
Vermilion	Perry	129.6	208.6	Bridge over Vermilion River	
Vermilion		130.7	210.3	LA 330 east (South State Street) – Henry	Western terminus of LA 330
Vermilion		130.8	210.5	LA 82 Truck / LA 3267 (Jacqulyn Street) – Delcambre, New Iberia	Southern terminus of LA 82 Truck; western terminus of LA 3267
Vermilion	Abbeville	132.2	212.8	LA 14 Bus. (Concord Street, Charity Street)	
Vermilion	Abbeville	132.8	213.7	LA 14 / LA 82 Truck (Veterans Memorial Drive) – New Iberia, Lafayette	Northern terminus of LA 82 Truck
Vermilion		141.0	226.9	LA 1246 (Lulu Road)	Eastern terminus of LA 1246
Vermilion	Vermilion–Lafayette parish line	143.0	230.1	End state maintenance on Racca Road	Eastern terminus
1.000 mi = 1.609 km; 1.000 km = 0.621 mi: Concurrency terminus; Tolled

== Truck route ==
Louisiana Highway 82 Truck
- Location: Abbeville
- Length: 6.5 mi (10.5 km)

Louisiana Highway 82 Truck (LA 82 Truck) runs 6.5 miles (10.5 km) in a general north–south direction, looping around the east side of Abbeville, the seat of Vermilion Parish. The route diverts truck traffic around the business section of the city via other state-maintained roadways, eliminating the need for large trucks to navigate several right-angle turns around the courthouse square. It also allows through traffic from the industrial corridor of Intracoastal City to reach LA 14 east of Abbeville more directly. Unlike its parent route, the signage for LA 82 Truck carries no directional banners.

From the south, LA 82 Truck begins at an intersection with LA 82 (South State Street) immediately south of the Abbeville city limits. It heads east on Jacqulyn Street, an undivided two-lane thoroughfare, running concurrent with LA 3267. After 2.8 miles (4.5 km), the route turns northeast onto South Airport Road. Passing through a point known as Grosse Isle, the highway has a grade crossing with the Louisiana and Delta Railroad (LDRR). Shortly afterward, LA 82 Truck and LA 3267 intersect LA 14 (Veterans Memorial Drive) near Abbeville Chris Crusta Memorial Airport on the east end of town. To the east, LA 14 heads through Erath and Delcambre toward US 90 in New Iberia.

The truck route turns west onto LA 14 and becomes an undivided four-lane highway with center turning lane. Curving to the northwest, the highway has a T-intersection with LA 14 Bus. (Charity Street). The business route follows Charity Street into the historic downtown area. LA 82 Truck proceeds along mainline LA 14, the modern commercial corridor of Abbeville, and curves back to the west at LA 338 (North Lafitte Road). one mile (1.6 km) later, the truck route ends at a second intersection with mainline LA 82 at North State Street. LA 14 proceeds across the Vermilion River (also known as Bayou Vermilion) to US 167, connecting with Lafayette to the north.

The portion of LA 82 Truck concurrent with LA 3267 is classified by the La DOTD as an urban collector west of John M. Hardy Drive and a rural minor collector otherwise. Daily traffic volume along this stretch was reported as 6,200 vehicles in 2013. The remainder of the route following LA 14 is classified as an urban principal arterial with daily traffic volume averaging between 18,400 and 20,700 vehicles. The posted speed limit is 45 mph (70 km/h) within the Abbeville city limits, generally increased to 55 mph (90 km/h) otherwise.

The portion of the route following LA 14 was constructed around 1966, while that running concurrent with LA 3267 consists of existing local roads added to the state highway system during the 1990s.

The entire highway is in Vermilion Parish.

Location	mi	km	Destinations	Notes
	0.0	0.0	LA 82 (South State Street) – Perry, Intracoastal City LA 3267 begins	Southern terminus of LA 82 Truck; western terminus of LA 3267; south end of LA 3267 concurrency
Abbeville	3.8	6.1	LA 14 east (Veterans Memorial Drive) – Delcambre, New Iberia LA 3267 ends	North end of LA 3267 concurrency; south end of LA 14 concurrency; eastern terminus of LA 3267
Abbeville	4.5	7.2	LA 14 Bus. west (Charity Street)	Eastern terminus of LA 14 Bus.
Abbeville	5.4	8.7	LA 338 (North Lafitte Road, North John M. Hardy Drive)	
Abbeville	6.5	10.5	LA 82 (North State Street) – Perry, Intracoastal City LA 14 west (Veterans Memorial Drive) – Kaplan, Lafayette	Northern terminus; north end of LA 14 concurrency
1.000 mi = 1.609 km; 1.000 km = 0.621 mi: Concurrency terminus
