= Geography of Lafayette, Louisiana =

Lafayette, Louisiana is part of the Gulf Coastal Plain region of the United States and is located at coordinates 30°12′50″N 92°01′46″W. It has an elevation of 36 feet (11.0 m). One of the physical characteristics of the geography include many streams that drain the parish. The primary river that runs through the city is the Vermilion River. This river was formed by the confluence of a few small bayous, stretches about 70 miles long, and drains into the Gulf of Mexico. Most of Lafayette's landscape is urban; however its humid and subtropic climate during the summer allow it to house many species of birds, alligators, and fish. The winter season is mild. While Lafayette is situated in a geographic location that is overall relatively safe, the city is susceptible to flooding; hurricanes are also a common natural disaster.

== Geography ==
Lafayette is located at 30°12′50″N 92°01′46″W and has an elevation of 36 feet (11.0 m).

According to the United States Census Bureau, the city has a total area of 47.7 square miles (123.5 km^{2}), of which, 47.6 square miles (123.3 km^{2}) is land and 0.1 square miles (0.2 km^{2}, or 0.19%) is water.

Lafayette is located on the West Gulf Coastal Plain. What is now Lafayette was part of the seabed during the Quaternary Period. During this time, the Mississippi River cut a 325-foot-deep (99 m) valley between what is now Lafayette and Baton Rouge. This valley was filled and is now the Atchafalaya Basin. Lafayette is located on the western rim of this valley. This land, called the southwestern Louisiana Prairie Terrace, is higher in elevation, and not made of wetland like much of the surrounding areas to the south and east of Lafayette. Because of this, Lafayette does not suffer significant flooding problems.

The Vermilion River runs through the center of Lafayette. Other significant waterways in the city are Isaac Verot Coulee, Coulee Mine, Coulee des Poches and Coulee Ile des Cannes, which are natural drainage canals that lead to the Vermilion River.

=== Climate ===
Lafayette's climate is described as humid subtropical using Köppen climate classification. Lafayette is typical of areas along the Gulf of Mexico in that it has hot, humid summers and mild winters. (See table below for average temperatures for Lafayette.)

Climate data for Lafayette Regional Airport, Louisiana (1991–2020 normals, extremes 1893–present)
Month	Jan	Feb	Mar	Apr	May	Jun	Jul	Aug	Sep	Oct	Nov	Dec	Year
Record high °F (°C)	87 (31)	87 (31)	93 (34)	93 (34)	98 (37)	106 (41)	107 (42)	110 (43)	103 (39)	98 (37)	92 (33)	89 (32)	110 (43)
Mean maximum °F (°C)	76.4 (24.7)	78.1 (25.6)	82.7 (28.2)	86.9 (30.5)	92.0 (33.3)	95.3 (35.2)	96.6 (35.9)	97.6 (36.4)	94.9 (34.9)	90.4 (32.4)	83.7 (28.7)	79.1 (26.2)	98.3 (36.8)
Mean daily maximum °F (°C)	62.2 (16.8)	66.1 (18.9)	72.6 (22.6)	79.0 (26.1)	85.9 (29.9)	90.2 (32.3)	91.5 (33.1)	92.3 (33.5)	89.0 (31.7)	81.3 (27.4)	71.5 (21.9)	64.4 (18.0)	78.8 (26.0)
Daily mean °F (°C)	52.8 (11.6)	56.8 (13.8)	62.9 (17.2)	69.2 (20.7)	76.5 (24.7)	81.6 (27.6)	83.3 (28.5)	83.5 (28.6)	79.7 (26.5)	70.7 (21.5)	60.8 (16.0)	54.9 (12.7)	69.4 (20.8)
Mean daily minimum °F (°C)	43.5 (6.4)	47.4 (8.6)	53.3 (11.8)	59.3 (15.2)	67.2 (19.6)	73.1 (22.8)	75.1 (23.9)	74.7 (23.7)	70.4 (21.3)	60.1 (15.6)	50.2 (10.1)	45.3 (7.4)	60.0 (15.6)
Mean minimum °F (°C)	26.4 (−3.1)	32.0 (0.0)	35.1 (1.7)	42.7 (5.9)	54.3 (12.4)	66.0 (18.9)	70.6 (21.4)	69.1 (20.6)	57.9 (14.4)	42.8 (6.0)	33.0 (0.6)	29.2 (−1.6)	24.6 (−4.1)
Record low °F (°C)	4 (−16)	6 (−14)	22 (−6)	32 (0)	42 (6)	51 (11)	59 (15)	58 (14)	41 (5)	27 (−3)	21 (−6)	9 (−13)	4 (−16)
Average precipitation inches (mm)	5.92 (150)	4.07 (103)	3.72 (94)	4.91 (125)	5.44 (138)	7.09 (180)	6.27 (159)	6.26 (159)	5.02 (128)	4.76 (121)	4.39 (112)	4.96 (126)	62.81 (1,595)
Average precipitation days (≥ 0.01 in)	10.0	9.3	8.7	7.5	8.4	12.2	14.1	12.2	9.4	7.6	8.3	9.8	117.5
Source: NOAA
