= Louisiana Highway 101 =

State highway in Louisiana, United States

Louisiana Highway 101

- Route of LA 101 highlighted in red

Route information
- Maintained by Louisiana DOTD
- Length: 17.278 mi (27.806 km)
- Existed: 1955 renumbering–present

Major junctions
- South end: LA 14 in Hayes
- US 90 in Lacassine; I-10 in Lacassine; US 165 in Woodlawn
- North end: LA 383 north of Iowa

Location
- Country: United States
- State: Louisiana
- Parishes: Calcasieu, Jefferson Davis

Highway system
- Louisiana State Highway System; Interstate; US; State; Scenic
← LA 100	→ LA 102

Louisiana Highway 101 (LA 101) is a state highway located in southwestern Louisiana. It runs 17.28 miles (27.81 km) in a general north–south direction from LA 14 in Hayes to LA 383 north of Iowa.

An entirely rural route traveling midway between the cities of Lake Charles and Jennings, LA 101 intersects three major highways: U.S. Highway 90 (US 90), Interstate 10 (I-10), and US 165. The majority of the route, running from the southern terminus across I-10, is bannered north–south. The remainder of the route on either side of US 165 runs east–west and is bannered accordingly.

LA 101 was designated in the 1955 Louisiana Highway renumbering, replacing portions of four shorter former routes. These included State Route 1156, State Route 728, State Route 744, and State Route 24-D, a former alignment of US 165.

== Route description ==
From the south, LA 101 begins at a junction with LA 14 on the west side of Hayes, an unincorporated community located in Calcasieu Parish. It heads north along a rural section line road and crosses into Jefferson Davis Parish after three miles (4.8 km).

Passing just to the west of Lacassine, LA 101 intersects US 90 and crosses the BNSF/UP railroad line at grade. Shortly afterward, the highway passes through a diamond interchange with the parallel I-10 at exit 48, connecting with the metropolitan areas of Lake Charles to the west and Lafayette to the east.

Three miles (4.8 km) north of I-10, LA 101 curves due west onto another section line road and through the tiny community of Woodlawn. Here, it crosses another rail line at grade and then immediately crosses US 165, a divided four-lane highway. US 165 connects with Iowa, its southern terminus, to the south and Kinder to the north. LA 101 continues just over three miles (4.8 km) further west to its northern terminus at an intersection with LA 383 north of Iowa.

=== Route classification and data ===
LA 101 is an undivided two-lane highway for its entire length. It is classified as a rural minor collector by the Louisiana Department of Transportation and Development (La DOTD). Daily traffic volume in 2013 peaked at 3,200 vehicles between US 90 and I-10 in Lacassine with a low of 1,120 reported through the Woodlawn area. The posted speed limit is 55 mph (90 km/h).

== History ==
In the original Louisiana Highway system in use between 1921 and 1955, the modern LA 101 made up parts of several routes, including State Route 1156 from Hayes to Lacassine; State Route 728 from Lacassine to the curve east of Woodlawn; State Route 744 from the curve to Woodlawn; and State Route 24-D west of Woodlawn. The first three were additions to the state highway system in 1930. The last, Route 24-D, indicates an earlier alignment of State Route 24, which was one of the original 98 state highways created in 1921. In 1926, Route 24 was selected to carry the southern portion of US 165 when the numbered U.S. Highway system was implemented. The portion of what is now LA 101 west of Woodlawn was therefore a small part of the original alignment of US 165 until the present alignment alongside the Missouri Pacific Railroad (now the Union Pacific Railroad) line was completed in 1939.

LA 101 was created when the Louisiana Department of Highways renumbered the state highway system in 1955, bringing the entire route under a single designation.

Class "B": La 101—From a junction with La 14 at or near Haynes[sic] to a junction with La-US 90 at or near Lacassine.
Class "C": La 101—From a junction with La-US 90 at or near Lacassine through or near Woodlawn to a junction with La 383.

— 1955 legislative route description

With the 1955 renumbering, the state highway department initially categorized all routes into three classes: "A" (primary), "B" (secondary), and "C" (farm-to-market). This system has since been updated and replaced by a more specific functional classification system.

Since the 1955 Louisiana Highway renumbering, the only change to the route of LA 101 has been the addition of the I-10 interchange at Lacassine. The diamond interchange, which includes a two-lane bridge carrying LA 101 over the interstate, was opened to traffic when the portion of I-10 between Iowa and Welsh was completed in December 1964.

== Major intersections ==
Parish	Location	mi	km	Destinations	Notes
Calcasieu	Hayes	0.000	0.000	LA 14 – Lake Charles, Lake Arthur	Southern terminus
Jefferson Davis	Lacassine	8.256	13.287	US 90 – Iowa, Welsh	
Jefferson Davis	Lacassine	9.155– 9.419	14.734– 15.158	I-10 – Lake Charles, Lafayette	Exit 48 on I-10
Jefferson Davis	Woodlawn	14.018– 14.038	22.560– 22.592	US 165 – Lake Charles, Kinder	
Jefferson Davis		17.278	27.806	LA 383	Northern terminus
1.000 mi = 1.609 km; 1.000 km = 0.621 mi
