= Flyway Byway =

The Flyway Byway is a Louisiana Scenic Byway that follows several different state highways:

- LA 14 from south of Hayes to Lake Arthur;
- LA 26 from Lake Arthur to Jennings;
- LA 99 from west of Lake Arthur to Welsh;
- LA 3056 from west of Lake Arthur to the Lacassine National Wildlife Refuge; and
- US 90 from Welsh to Jennings.
