= Abbeville Airport =

Abbeville Airport may refer to:

- Abbeville Airfield serving Abbeville, France (ICAO: LFOI)
- Abbeville Chris Crusta Memorial Airport in Abbeville, Louisiana, US (FAA: 0R3)
- Abbeville Municipal Airport in Abbeville, Alabama, US (FAA: 0J0)
