= Texas State Highway 82 =

State highway in Jefferson County, Texas, United States

State Highway 82
- SH 82 highlighted in red

Route information
- Maintained by TxDOT
- Length: 13.009 mi (20.936 km)
- Existed: January 29, 1975–present

Major junctions
- South end: LA 82 over Sabine River
- SH 87 in Port Arthur
- North end: SH 73 in Port Arthur

Location
- Country: United States
- State: Texas
- Counties: Jefferson

Highway system
- Highways in Texas; Interstate; US; State; Former; Toll; Loops; Spurs; FM/RM; Park; Rec
← US 82	→ US 83

State Highway 82 (SH 82) is a 13.009-mile (20.936 km) state highway in Jefferson County, Texas, United States, that connects Louisiana Highway 82 (LA 82) at the Louisiana state line (on the Causeway Bridge over the Sabine River) with Texas State Highway 73 (SH 73) in Port Arthur. A roadway existed from at least 1970, when the Gulfgate Bridge (later renamed Martin Luther King Bridge) was completed; the route was designated SH 82 in 1975. The designation had previously applied to a route in West Texas, from 1923 to 1958.

== History ==
=== Pecos, Ward, and Winkler counties ===

SH 82 was originally designated on August 21, 1923, on a route from the West Texas town of Monahans south to Fort Stockton, with a planned extension south to Sanderson, replacing part of SH 17. On October 16, 1928, SH 82 was extended north to Kermit. On June 25, 1929, SH 82 was extended north to the New Mexico state line. The planned extension to Sanderson was transferred to newly designated U.S. Highway 285 (cosigned since 1935) on September 26, 1939. On February 27, 1958, the remainder of the route was renumbered as SH 18, to coordinate with its intersection with New Mexico State Road 18.

=== Jefferson County ===
On January 29, 1975, SH 82 was designated over its current route in Jefferson County from SH 87 to Louisiana Highway 82. On January 7, 1987, the route was extended 2.1 miles (3.4 km) to SH 73 incorporating the former Spur 214. The section west of Sabine Pass was previously proposed on September 19, 1956, as SH 362 (for access to the proposed levee; to be cancelled when construction was completed), but the designation was changed to FM 1900 on December 13, 1956 (still was to be cancelled when construction was completed), and FM 1900 was completed, and FM 1900 was cancelled on October 30, 1958, due to completion of construction.

== Major junctions ==
The entire route is in Jefferson County.

Location	mi	km	Destinations	Notes
	0.000	0.000	LA 82 east – Cameron	Continuation east into Louisiana from southern terminus
	0.000	0.000	Sabine River	Southern terminus
Port Arthur			SH 87 north (Dowling Road) – Orange SH 87 south (Dowling Road) – Sabine Pass, Sea Rim State Park	
Port Arthur	13.009	20.936	SH 73 east – Groves SH 73 west (H O Mills Highway) – Houston, Galveston	Northern terminus; trumpet interchange
1.000 mi = 1.609 km; 1.000 km = 0.621 mi

== See also ==
- List of state highways in Texas
