= Hayes, Louisiana =

- Census-designated place
- Location within Louisiana
- Coordinates: 30°06′40″N 92°55′25″W
- Country: United States
- State: Louisiana
- Parish: Calcasieu
- Founded: 1832 as Dugas Pasture
- Named: 1904
- Named after: Thomas Hayes

Area
  - Total: 2.82 sq mi (7.31 km^{2})
  - Land: 2.78 sq mi (7.20 km^{2})
  - Water: 0.042 sq mi (0.11 km^{2})
- Elevation: 7 ft (2.1 m)

Population (2020)
  - Total: 676
  - Density: 243.1/sq mi (93.88/km^{2})
- Time zone: UTC-6 (CST)
  - Summer (DST): UTC-5 (CST)
- ZIP Codes: 70646
- Area Code: 337
- FIPS code: 22-33490
- GNIS feature ID: 2586684

Hayes (pronounced heɪz) is an unincorporated community and census-designated place (CDP) located in Calcasieu Parish, Louisiana, United States. As of the 2020 census, Hayes had a population of 676. It is part of the Lake Charles Metropolitan Statistical Area.

== Geography ==
Hayes is located in the southeastern corner of Calcasieu Parish, on the west bank of Bayou Lacassine, which forms the boundary with Jefferson Davis Parish. Louisiana Highway 14 runs through the center of the community, leading west 3 miles (5 km) to Bell City and south then east 18 miles (29 km) to Lake Arthur. Lake Charles, the Calcasieu Parish seat, is 26 miles (42 km) to the northwest.

According to the U.S. Census Bureau, the community has a total area of 2.8 square miles (7.3 km^{2}), of which 0.039 square miles (0.1 km^{2}), or 1.52%, is water.

== History ==
In the beginning, Hayes was known as Dugas Pasture or "La Savanne des Dugas", named for a cattle grazer from Andrus Cove who discovered this bountiful pasture land. Cattle could be kept here without supervision because the area was bounded on the east by the Lacassine Bayou, on the north and west by swampland, and on the south by marsh. In 1832 Thomas Hayes moved into Dugas Pasture and became the first while settler there. He married Mary Ann Foreman of Andrus Cove, and they settled near the Lacassine Bayou.

The next settler was William Holland, born in Tennessee in 1809. Holland, pioneer and father of nine children, established a school in what was now becoming known as Hayes (for Thomas Hayes, the first settler). Using a team of oxen, he moved an old slave cabin onto his properly, and he hired his friend Tom Cannon as the teacher. The next settler in Dugas Pasture was a widow with seven sons and one daughter. In 1854, Mrs. Bazeline Derouen of New Iberia bought a piece of property from the U.S. government, near the Lorrain settlement. On her property, the first Methodist church was established in 1898. It was a simple, one-room structure with a small, foot-operated organ. The first pastor was the Rev. Robert P. Howell. Prior to that, as far back as 1835, Methodist circuit riders had come into the area on horseback and held meetings in the Hayes and Holland homes. In 1905, after the railroad came to Hayes and the population shifted, the Methodist congregation decided the location was out of the way, so Bill Cox loaded the church building on a logging wagon and moved it to its present site in Hayes.

Francois, Louis, and Eugene Lorrain came from France and settled in the Hayes area in 1860, in what was known as the Lorrain Settlement. The Lorrain Settlement had a brick mill, sugar mill, grits mill and sawmill which operated before steam boilers and used two men with cross-saws to work the mill. Louis Lorrain built a school in the settlement about 1860 and hired a teacher from France named Pierre Lenoir. The school was kept open by Paul Lorrain, who hired Marcelne Goodeaux as a teacher. She boarded with the family. Other teachers were Glady Kinsey and Miss Dicarlo. Then the school was moved to Hayes; early teachers there were Helen Bienvieu, Veva Stribling (Thom), J.R. Logan, Irma Howarton and Misses Freeman, Landreneaux, and Roy. There was a post office at Lorrain around 1880, with mail brought up the bayou by schooner. Mrs. Aueline Lorrain was the postmistress.

Another family moved into the Hayes area in 1885: Ophelien Primeaux, grandfather of Eloi Primeaux. In 1875, the first Gibbs made his appearance. Mr. and Mrs. George Gibbs moved to Hayes from Lowry and opened a general store, with living quarters upstairs. Kinney Gibbs was manager of the Island Plantation near Hayes which was owned by the Rice Plantation and Canal Company.

Others settling in the area in the earliest days included families named Brown, Atkinson, Moore, Mitchell, Duhon, Verret, Lemelle, Andrus, and Trahan. They were followed, after the turn of the century, by Gossett, Morgan, Gravelle, Carmouche, Fruge, Kent, Derouen, Theriot and Walker. Groups of northern farmers were brought down by J.B. Watkins' extensive advertising of the "Garden of Eden" in the Deep South.

This area remained isolated for many years. Midwives delivered most of the children. A Cherokee "medicine woman" used concoctions prepared from herbs and plants to treat everything from snake bites to toothaches. The first doctor, Leroy Lambert, did not come until 1916.

The Louisiana Western Railroad, through Lake Charles, Holmwood, Bell City, Hayes, and Lake Arthur, was completed in 1904. Overnight, Hayes became a thriving little community. Toliver Hayes, son of the original settler, sold the rights-of-way and a depot site to the Railroad Company and 40 acres (16 ha) of land to be used as a town site. Thus, the name of Hayes became permanent for the area. In March 1906, a new saw mill was established by Frank Dearborn and Jesse Thom called Hayes Cypress and Lumber Co. Less than two years later, J.M. Nugent of Alexandria purchased controlling interest.

A rice mill was built and a post office opened. In March 1911, Felix Hebert became postmaster after the resignation of Hayes' first postmaster, Solomon Hayes. Jesse Leo Thom was postmaster for 20 years until his death in 1948. Evelyn Hayes, niece of the first postmaster, served through 1981.

A small school near the big "S" curve on the edge of Hayes was believed to have been established in 1895.

=== 20th century time-line ===
1903 Toliver Hayes transferred to M.E. Shaddock land for First Baptist Church of Hayes.

1906 By a vote of 42 to 1 the Hayes precinct prohibited the sale of liquor, making Hayes a dry town.

1910 The first public school, under the supervision of the Calcasieu School Board, was opened.

1923 Marked the beginning of the "Lafitte Cut-Off Old Spanish Trail" highway project, extending from New Iberia to Lake Charles, via Abbeville, Kaplan, Gueydan, Lake Arthur, Hayes, and Holmwood. On the elected committee to represent Hayes in this highway project was J. W. Gardiner. By July 1925 only 3 miles (5 km) on each side of Bayou Lacassine remained incomplete.

1930 Talking and sound picture equipment was installed in the Magnolia Theater by Felix Hebert, owner. Mr. Hebert reported to the Lake Charles American Press he was convinced that Hayes, with a population of only 80 persons, is the smallest town in the U.S. to have this up-to-date type of entertainment. With no electric lines, a private power plant was established to run the theater.

1934 oil was discovered.

1938 electricity was brought into Hayes.

1941 Hayes Elementary school had 140 students

1944 The Hayes Library opened on April 10. It was located in Martin's Store, and Mrs. Emma Martin was the first branch manager.

1946 Natural gas plant established.

1947 The first PTA was organized, with Mrs. Elias Lorrain as president.

1948 A gas heating system was installed in Hayes School.

1950 Researcher Eloi Primeaux documented 300 registered voters among the 1,200 people living in Hayes.

1953 St. Daniel Catholic Chapel was dedicated and named in honor of Father Daniel Habetz.

1955 The Hayes Branch of the Calcasieu Parish library celebrated the use of a new building. The new building was owned by Miss Evelyn Hayes, local postmaster, and Mrs. Horace Hebert was the local librarian.

1968 The Hayes Water System was incorporated.

1971 January 4 Consolidation of Hayes and Bell City Schools.

== Climate ==
Residents of Hayes always stay aware of the possibility of evacuations during the official hurricane season from June 1 to November 30.

On average, the warmest month is July with an average high of 91 °F (33 °C). The highest recorded temperature was 105 °F (41 °C) in 2000. On average, the coolest month is January with an average low of 41 °F (5 °C). The lowest recorded temperature was 11 °F (−12 °C) in 1951.

The maximum average precipitation occurs in May with average rainfall of 6.06 inches (15.4 cm), and the minimum average precipitation occurs in February with average rainfall of 3.27 inches (8.3 cm).

== Demographics ==
Historical population
| Census | Pop. | Note | %± |
|---|---|---|---|
| 2010 | 780 | | — |
| 2020 | 676 | | −13.3% |
U.S. Decennial Census

Hayes was first listed as a census designated place in the 2010 U.S. census. The 2010 United States census population was 780.

2000 United States census Demographic Profile Highlights:

| General Characteristics - for 70646 | Number |
|---|---|
| Total population | 418 |
| Male | 205 |
| Female | 213 |
| Median age (years) | 40 |
| Under 5 years | 21 |
| 18 years and over | 307 |
| 65 years and over | 59 |
| White | 405 |
| Black or African American | 4 |
| Asian | 1 |
| Other Race | 3 |
| Two or more races | 5 |
| Hispanic or Latino | 7 |
| Average household size | 2.65 |
| Average family size | 3.24 |
| Total housing units | 200 |
| Owner occupied | 138 |
| Renter-occupied | 20 |
| Vacant | 42 |
| Social characteristics | Number |
| Civilian veterans ( 18 years and over) | 15 |
| Disability status (5 years and over) | 93 |
| Male, Now married, except separated (population 15 years and over) | 57 |
| Female, Now married, except separated (population 15 years and over) | 67 |
| Speak a language other than English at home (population 5 years and over) | 103 |
| Economic characteristics | Number |
| Mean travel time to work in minutes (workers 16 years and older) | 38.7 |
| Median household income in 1999 | $14,844 |
| Individuals below poverty level | 78 |

2009 OASDI beneficiaries for Hayes, La - 70646 Social Security refers to the federal Old-Age, Survivors, and Disability Insurance (OASDI) program.

In 2009 beneficiaries total was 150. The breakdown of this total is: Retired workers 70, Disabled workers 20, Widow(er)s 30, Spouses 15, Children 15

Monthly benefits are $141,000. The breakdown of this total is: Retired workers $73,000, Widow(er)s $28,000, Aged 65 or older $95,000

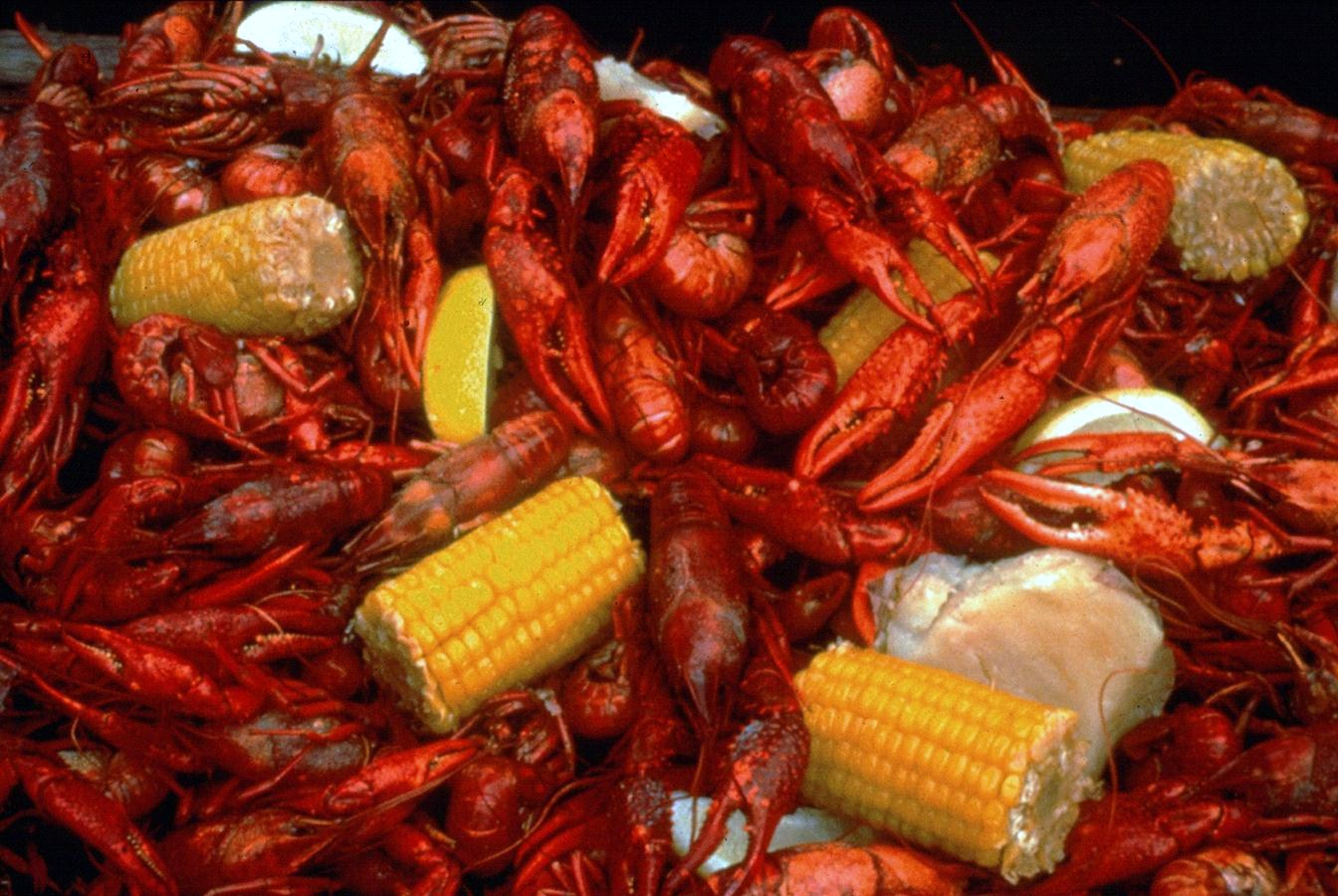
Crawfish - Cajun Cuisine

== Culture ==
Hayes has a strong Cajun culture and retains a unique dialect of the Cajun-French language and numerous other cultural traits that distinguish them as an ethnic group.

The Cajun cuisine of the region is one of the most famous regional cuisines in the United States.

== Outdoor recreation ==
=== Lorrain Park ===
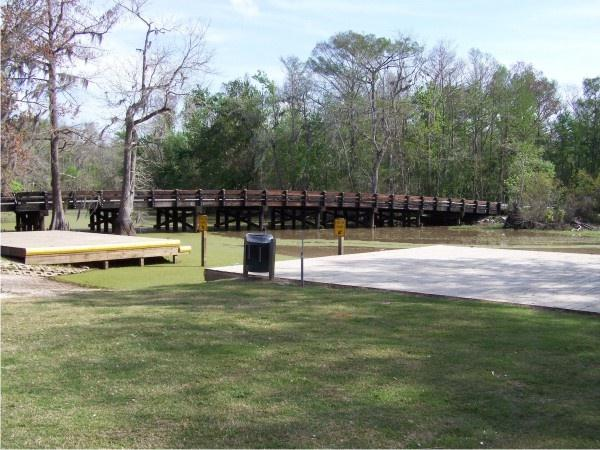
Lorrain Park

Lorrain Park is located at the foot of Lorrain Bridge. Because of its unique design and construction, Lorrain Bridge is in the National Register of Historical Places. The site was acquired in 1894, and a wooden drawbridge was constructed around 1895. In 1920 it was re-constructed, still as a wooden drawbridge. It was damaged in 1950, repaired in 1951, and in 1955 the drawbridge portion was disabled. The bridge remained open and connected Calcasieu Parish and Jefferson Davis Parish until it was closed to traffic in March 1998. Due to joint efforts of the Lorrain Bridge Association, the Calcasieu Parish Police Jury and Jeff Davis Police Jury, the bridge was rebuilt and opened to traffic on July 1, 2004.

Lorrain Park has a public boat launch allowing access into the Lacassine Bayou. Two wharves are available at the launch site. A fish cleaning area is also provided for the convenience of park users. The park has tent camp sites and nine RV camper sites with electricity available. A dump station is available for RV campers.

=== Hayes Park ===
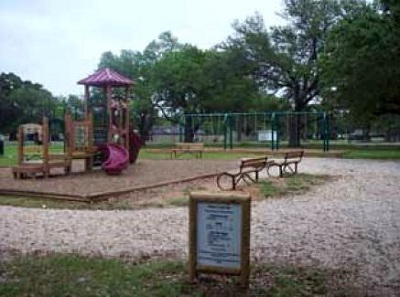
Hayes Park

Hayes Park includes a swing set, swing safety surround, trash bins, picnic tables, a walking trail, landscaping, and playground equipment for small children. It is located behind the Calcasieu Parish Library-Hayes Branch.

In February 2010, the Bell City FFA was awarded a grant from the Lt. Governor's Learn and Serve Commission to construct the park. The FFA teamed up with several community partners for the project, including the Calcasieu Parish Ward Recreation Board.

=== Hunting and fishing ===
Hunting is concentrated on ducks and specklebelly geese. Hunting in Bayou Lacassine and area rice fields can be found within a five-minute drive of Hayes. There are many hunting packages available to a visitor from area hunting guides.

Lacassine National Wildlife Refuge - Lacassine Pool, photo a 16,000-acre (6,500 ha) freshwater impoundment and major feature of the refuge, is at the end of Illinois Plant Road, 4.5 miles (7.2 km) south of Highway 14 and 3 miles (5 km) south of Hayes.

Hunting and fishing are two of the most popular refuge activities. A nature drive, foot trails, and observation towers are available year-round. Bird watching is also very popular, with a bird list available at the refuge. Most wildlife species found on the refuge are those indigenous to the marshes of coastal Louisiana. Nesting colonies of wading birds, alligators, mink, otter, and raccoon are found on the refuge.

=== ABT Tournament ===
The ABT Tournament is a local competition where sportsmen may fish any public body of water within 25 miles (40 km) (driving) of the registration site, located at Aucoin's Cajun Restaurant in Hayes. During the 2009 tournament the regulation was set to allow three bass, 11 in (28 cm) minimum catch and release, with a penalty for any dead fish. These fish were released back into a local public body of water by the tournament director. Most of the fishermen entered in the tournament fished Lacassine Pool. During the spring that year, there were two stringers of 18 lb + (8.2 kg) weighed in by fishermen targeting fish by sight fishing.

=== Up and Coming Outdoors ===
This open fishing team tournament takes place in March starting at the registration site, Aucoin's Cajun Restaurant. Teams can fish any public body of water within 15 miles (24 km) of Hayes.

=== Lorrain Bridge Queens and Kings Pageant ===
2010 marked the eighth annual Lorrain Bridge King and Queen's Pageant held annually in June.

== Government ==
Voting Precinct: 262

As per state law, the Calcasieu Parish Police Jury has the authority to appoint special districts, boards, commissions, etc. for the purpose of providing specific services for a designated area within the Parish. Each of these districts and boards governs its own activities and has its own budget.

Special districts for Hayes:

Fire Protection District No. One of Ward Two (located on Galley Rd, Hayes), Gravity Drainage District No. Nine of Ward Two, and Community Center (Parks) / Recreation District No. Seven of Ward Two.

Elected officials

Justice of the Peace (Ward 2) and Constable (Ward 2)

== Education ==
K-12 attend Bell City High School, in Bell City, 3 miles (5 km) west of Hayes.

== Musicians ==
Rufus Thibodeaux musician

== Churches ==
- First Baptist Church, 7718 E Highway 14
- Faith Christian Fellowship, 7769 Georgia Avenue

== Cemeteries ==
- Hayes Cemetery; oldest known grave-site: Thomas Hayes, 1809–1870
- Derouen Cemetery; oldest known grave-site: Natalie Derouen, 08 Mar 1824 - 15 Mar 1868
