= Lacassine, Louisiana =

- Census-designated place
- Location within Louisiana Location within the United States
- Coordinates: 30°14′6″N 92°55′19.2″W
- Country: United States
- State: Louisiana
- Parish: Jefferson Davis

Area
  - Total: 1.75 sq mi (4.53 km^{2})
  - Land: 1.75 sq mi (4.53 km^{2})
  - Water: 0 sq mi (0.00 km^{2})
- Elevation: 21 ft (6.4 m)

Population (2020)
  - Total: 490
  - Density: 280.0/sq mi (108.11/km^{2})
- Time zone: UTC-6 (CST)
  - Summer (DST): UTC-5 (CDT)
- ZIP Code: 70650
- Area code: 337
- FIPS code: 22-40595
- GNIS feature ID: 554960

Lacassine (French: La Cassine) is an unincorporated community and census-designated place (CDP) in Jefferson Davis Parish in the U.S. state of Louisiana. As of the 2020 census, Lacassine had a population of 490.

== Etymology ==
One story about the name of the community is that a tribe of Comanche Indians, led by their chief Lacassine, migrated to southwest Louisiana to hunt and fish in the early 19th century, settling near this place.

Another story about the name states that the part of the parish where the community is located was visited regularly by different tribes of the area, including the Atakapa and Choctaw people. Game was abundant here, and the Indians called it their "hunting ground", or, in the Choctaw language, La Cassine. However, the phrase sounds more French than Indian. La Cassine means "the small house" in French. According to Monsignor Jules Daigle, noted authority of the Cajun language, it was named for a small house built by an Indian chief in that location.

== Geography ==
Lacassine is in western Jefferson Davis Parish along U.S. Route 90, which leads west 6 miles (10 km) to Iowa and east the same distance to Welsh. Interstate 10 runs along the northern edge of Lacassine, with access from Exit 48 (Louisiana Highway 101). I-10 leads west 18 miles (29 km) to Lake Charles and east the same distance to Jennings, the Jefferson Davis parish seat.

According to the U.S. Census Bureau, the Lacassine CDP has an area of 1.7 square miles (4.5 km^{2}), all of it land. West Bayou Lacassine flows southward along the eastern edge of the community, reaching tidewater at Lacassine National Wildlife Refuge 15 miles (24 km) to the south.

== Demographics ==
Historical population
Census	Pop.	Note	%±
2010	480		—
2020	490		2.1%
U.S. Decennial Census

Lacassine was first listed as a census designated place in the 2010 U.S. census.

== Economics ==
The Little Kahuna Water Park was being constructed off Interstate 10 in Lacassine, but was never completed due to monetary problems. Lacassine is home of the Louisiana Spirits Distillery, where Bayou Rum, a popular adult beverage in Louisiana, is distilled. Construction began in 2011 and Bayou Rum was created in 2013.
