= Holmwood, Louisiana =

- Unincorporated community
- Location within Louisiana Location within the United States
- Coordinates: 30°07′27″N 93°04′32″W
- Country: United States
- State: Louisiana
- Parish: Calcasieu
- Elevation: 16 ft (4.9 m)
- Time zone: UTC-6 (Central (CST))
  - Summer (DST): UTC-5 (CDT)
- Area code: 337
- GNIS feature ID: 535746

Holmwood is an unincorporated community in Calcasieu Parish, Louisiana, United States. Holmwood is located at the junction of Louisiana highways 14 and 27, 10.8 miles (17.4 km) southeast of Lake Charles.
