= Bell City, Louisiana =

Bell City
- Unincorporated community
- Interactive map of Bell City
- Coordinates: 30°06′48″N 92°57′46″W
- Country: United States
- State: Louisiana
- Parish: Calcasieu
- Named: 1902
- Named for: A. E. Bell

Area
  - Land: 143.85 sq mi (372.6 km^{2})
  - Water: 2.75 sq mi (7.1 km^{2})
- Elevation: 07 ft (2.1 m)

Population
  - Total: 418
  - Density: 2.91/sq mi (1.12/km^{2})
- Time zone: UTC-6 (CST)
  - Summer (DST): UTC-5 (CST)
- ZIP Code: 70630
- Area Code: 337
- GNIS feature ID: 553581

Bell City is an unincorporated community located in the southeast corner of Calcasieu Parish, Louisiana, United States. It is part of the Lake Charles metropolitan area.

Bell City is in Calcasieu Parish, however the documented statistics are for ZIP Code 70630 which has segments in two parishes, Calcasieu and Cameron. The 70630 ZIP Code is at latitude 30.098 and longitude -93.013. Bell City is in the Central Time Zone (UTC -6 hours) and observes daylight saving time. According to the 2000 United States census, the population in ZIP Code 70630 was 892 with 385 housing units; a land area of 143.85 sq. miles; a water area of 2.75 sq. miles; and a population density of 6.20 people per sq. mile.

== History 1902 ==
The 1902 Welsh Rice Belt Journal says:

“The new town, on the Lacassine extension of the Louisiana Western (R.R.), has been named Bell City, after A. E. Bell of this place, one of the founders and promoters of the town that will henceforth bear his name.”

“Sites for a railroad depot, post office and a large school building have been donated and the work of building will begin as soon as proper arrangements can be made and the material hauled to the ground. Twelve lots have been sold, on which business houses will be erected, and scores of residence lots have been sold. The town has been nicely laid off and the work of grading the streets is now in progress.”

“Messrs. P. W. Daniels and I. E. Wesson, of this city, are at present erecting a large feed store and implement warehouse, and it is only a matter of a short time until Bell City will be one of the busiest little places in this section”.

“The new town is located fifteen miles southwest of Welsh, and is in the midst of a rice growing section and will be a boon to that portion of Calcasieu. The building of the new railroad from Lake Charles to Lake Arthur will open a new country adapted to rice culture and adds considerably to the area of the cultivation of that cereal in southwest Louisiana.”

== Events and Charters ==
About 1895 Christian College was built on the present site of the Bell City ball park by Martin and Willie Hebert and Dallas and Dan Hayes. It consisted of at least four buildings; two dormitories, one for teachers and workers, and one for classrooms.

1907 Jan 17 The Charter of Bell City Mercantile Co. with a capital stock of $10,000 for conducting general merchandise business. Isaac Derouen is president, Stephen E. Stine is vice president, Placide Derouen in Secretary and treasurer. Along with Paul W. Daniels they are the first board of directors.

1908 Mar 24 The Charter of Bell City College with a domicile at Bell City, Louisiana was filed with the district clerk.

1909 May 31 The Railroad Commission reports Louisiana Western railway is to build a combination depot at Bell City

1918 The present Bell City School began operation. LD Bayne was first principal, followed by TS Cooley, Thompson, James Dent and Stanford Cox who was principal for 32 years.

During World War II (1939–1945), a prisoner of war camp was erected in the center of Bell City, furnishing laborers for area farmers whose sons and farm hands had gone off to war.

1944 April 4 The Bell City Library opened and was originally housed in the Bell City Elementary School. In August 1944, the Library moved into a small office owned by Andrew Delaney, husband of the Library's Branch Manager, Hanan V. Delaney. It was housed in the office until 1990 when the Capitol Improvement Program allowed purchase of land, renovation and expansion of a new building. Work was completed and the new library opened in January 1994.
The Calcasieu Parish Public Library merged the Bell City and Hayes branches on December 28. The merger of the two branches, which are 1.2 miles apart, a two-minute trip by car, enables more enhanced service to the area. The last day of operation for the Bell City branch was December 23, 2009.

1950 Jun 05 A Charter for the official Association of Lions Clubs was presented to the Bell City-Hayes-Holmwood Lions Club at the Bell City High gymnasium.

1951 Jan 28 The Broussard Dairy, at Bell City, received grade A rating for their pasteurization plant.

1969 Clarence Theriot became principal of Bell City Schools when Hayes and Bell City schools were combined and following the retirement of Stanford Cox. A lifelong supporter of Bell City academics and athletics, the new gym and floor at Bell City was named for Clarence Theriot following his death in June 2022. His grandson, TJ Hoffpauir continues his legacy of service at the school as a teacher, coach, and athletic director.

== Climate ==
Residents of Bell City always stay aware of the possibility of evacuations during the official hurricane season from June 1 to November 30.

On average, the warmest month is July with an average high of 91 °F. The highest recorded temperature was 105 °F in 2000.

On average, the coolest month is January with an average low of 41 °F. The lowest recorded temperature was 11 °F in 1951.

The maximum average precipitation occurs in May with average rainfall of 6.06 inches and the minimum average precipitation occurs in February with average rainfall of 3.27 inches.

== Demographics ==
2000 United States census Demographic Profile Highlights

General Characteristics - for 70630	Number
Total population	892
Male	445
Female	447
Median age (years)	33.9
Under 5 years	57
18 years and over	639
65 years and over	91
White	878
Black or African American	8
Other Race	2
Two or more races	4
Hispanic or Latino	11
Average household size	2.75
Average family size	3.24
Total housing units	385
Owner occupied	258
Renter-occupied	66
Vacant	61
Social Characteristics	Number
Civilian veterans ( 18 years and over)	90
Disability status (5 years and over)	75
Male, Now married, except separated (population 15 years and over)	282
Female, Now married, except separated (population 15 years and over)	285
Speak a language other than English at home (population 5 years and over)	96
Economic Characteristics	Number
Mean travel time to work in minutes (workers 16 years and older)	33.2
Median household income in 1999	$37,250
Individuals below poverty level	52

== Outdoor recreation ==
Bell City Drainage Ditch allows access to hunting and fishing. It makes up the west border of the Lacassine National Wildlife Refuge which was created in 1937 as a habitat for wintering waterfowl in the coastal prairie of southwestern Louisiana.

== Government ==
As per state law, the Calcasieu Parish Police Jury has the authority to appoint special districts, boards, commissions, etc. for the purpose of providing specific services for a designated area within the Parish. Each of these districts and boards governs its own activities and has its own budget.

Bell City is in Calcasieu Parish Police Jury District 10.

== Education ==
K-12 attend Bell City High School, Bell City, La. The 2000 Census recorded 604 adults in Bell City (70630) over the age of 25. Of those, 403 are high school graduates or higher and 64 had bachelor's degrees or higher.

== Churches ==
St John Vianney Church

Founded in 1939

St. John Vianney Parish occupies the southeastern portion of Calcasieu Civil Parish, a predominantly agricultural area. The parish was officially established in 1939 by the Most Rev. Jules B. Jeanmard, Bishop of Lafayette, and it serves three communities—Bell City, Hayes and Holmwood.

Prior to the establishment of the parish, Catholics in the area were served by priests from Our Lady Help of Christians Parish in Jennings, Louisiana. Later priests from Our Lady of Seven Dolors Parish in Welsh, Louisiana and then from St. Raphael Parish in Iowa, Louisiana celebrated Mass in the area.

A chapel dedicated to Saint Joseph was built about 1900, and served until it was destroyed by a storm in 1939.

The founding pastor, the Rev. Mathias J. Cramers, arrived in April 1938 to get things moving. A hall which the Altar Society had built to hold fund-raising bazaars was transformed into a temporary chapel for the celebration of Mass. First item on Father Cramer's agenda was the construction of a rectory, which was completed in August 1939.

The next project was a church, and the groundbreaking was held on Aug. 8, 1940. The building was completed, and was dedicated by Bishop Jeanmard on Dec. 1 of the same year. The first parish trustees were Ferdinand Nunez and Harry Verret. The first official parish records began in May 1939. Earlier records were kept in Jennings, beginning in 1892, in Welsh from 1904 and Iowa from 1930.

In 1950 the Rev. Daniel Habetz succeeded Father Cramers as pastor, and one of his first projects was the construction of St. Daniel Chapel in Hayes, on property donated by Mr. and Mrs. Felix Hebert. The chapel was dedicated on April 16, 1953, and St. Daniel Mission was officially attached to St. John Vianney Parish.

Over the years, many improvements have been made on church facilities. In 1981 the church in Bell City was renovated. There is also a Catechism center behind the rectory, and halls in Bell City and Hayes.

In 2000, the parish served a congregation of 375 families and the pastor was the Rev. V. Wayne LeBleu, assigned in 1999. 250 students from kindergarten through grade 12 attended instruction.

Another major organization is Bell City's Knights of Columbus Council 3048, which was organized and chartered on April 9, 1957, with Matthew Fruge as the charter Grand Knight.

The Bell City Ladies Altar Society was formed in 1905, with Mrs. Dulva Derouen as first president. The Ladies Altar Society in Hayes, Louisiana was organized in 1952, with Mrs. Elias Lorrain as the first president.
