= Bell City High School (Louisiana) =

Location
- 7161 Highway 14 East; Bell City, Louisiana 70630; United States; 30.1254°N 92.9631°W

Information
- School type: Public high school
- Motto: "To Create Lifelong Learners in a Caring Community"
- Founded: 1922
- School district: Calcasieu Parish School Board
- Principal: Jason Foolkes
- Staff: 59.93 (FTE)
- Grades: K–12
- Enrollment: 815 (2023–2024)
- Student to teacher ratio: 13.60
- Colors: Royal blue, Columbia blue, and white
- Athletics conference: LHSAA Class B
- Mascot: Bruin
- Nickname: Bruins
- Yearbook: Le Petit Ours (The Little Bear)
- Website: bellcity.cpsb.org

Bell City High School is a public K-12 school located in Bell City, Louisiana, United States and is a part of the Calcasieu Parish School Board.

The school mascot is the Bruins.

== Facts and figures ==
Enrollment Data as of Oct. 2010
Category	Number
Total students	600
Male	307 - 51.17%
Female	293 - 48.83%
Kindergarten	40
Grade 1	50
Grade 2	45
Grade 3	46
Grade 4	44
Grade 5	44
Grade 6	52
Grade 7	39
Grade 8	59
Grade 9	50
Grade 10	53
Grade 11	43
Grade 12	35

== School organizations ==
- 4-H Club
- Chess Club
- Future Business Leaders of America
- Fellowship of Christian Athletes
- Future Farmers of America
- French Club
- Literary Rally
- Quiz Bowl
- Student Council
- Beta Club
- Yearbook

== Athletics ==
Bell City High athletics competes in the LHSAA.

Sports sponsored:

- Baseball
- Boys/Girls Basketball
- Boys/Girls Cross Country
- Boys Golf
- Boys/Girls Rodeo
- Softball
- Boys/Girls Track & Field
- Esports
