= Intracoastal City, Louisiana =

Intracoastal City
- Unincorporated community
- Location of Intracoastal City in Louisiana
- Coordinates: 29°47′31″N 92°08′49″W
- Country: United States
- State: Louisiana
- Parish: Vermilion
- Time zone: UTC-6 (CST)
  - Summer (DST): UTC-5 (CDT)

Intracoastal City (French: Ville Intercôtière) is an unincorporated community in Vermilion Parish, Louisiana, United States. It is situated on the west bank of the Vermilion River at its junction with the Gulf Intracoastal Waterway and has various port facilities and some permanent residents.

Intracoastal City is approximately 13 miles (21 km) south of Abbeville, the Vermilion Parish seat. It is part of the Abbeville Micropolitan Statistical Area as well as the Acadiana region of Louisiana.

On September 4, 2011 Tropical Storm Lee made landfall south-west of the area.

On July 13, 2019 Hurricane Barry made landfall in the area.

== Culture ==
Its facilities include heliports, a shrimp docking facility, and dry docks. As it stands on the coast of the Gulf of Mexico somewhat remote from major settlements, it is often used by the National Hurricane Center as a breakpoint for tropical cyclone warnings and watches which affect the bayous of eastern Louisiana but not the west of the state. It also plays a major part in Louisiana's oil and gas industry by supporting offshore personnel, platforms and drilling rigs.

== Climate ==
The climate in this area is characterized by hot, humid summers and generally mild to cool winters. According to the Köppen Climate Classification system, Intracoastal City has a humid subtropical climate, abbreviated "Cfa" on climate maps.
