= Vermilion River (Louisiana) =

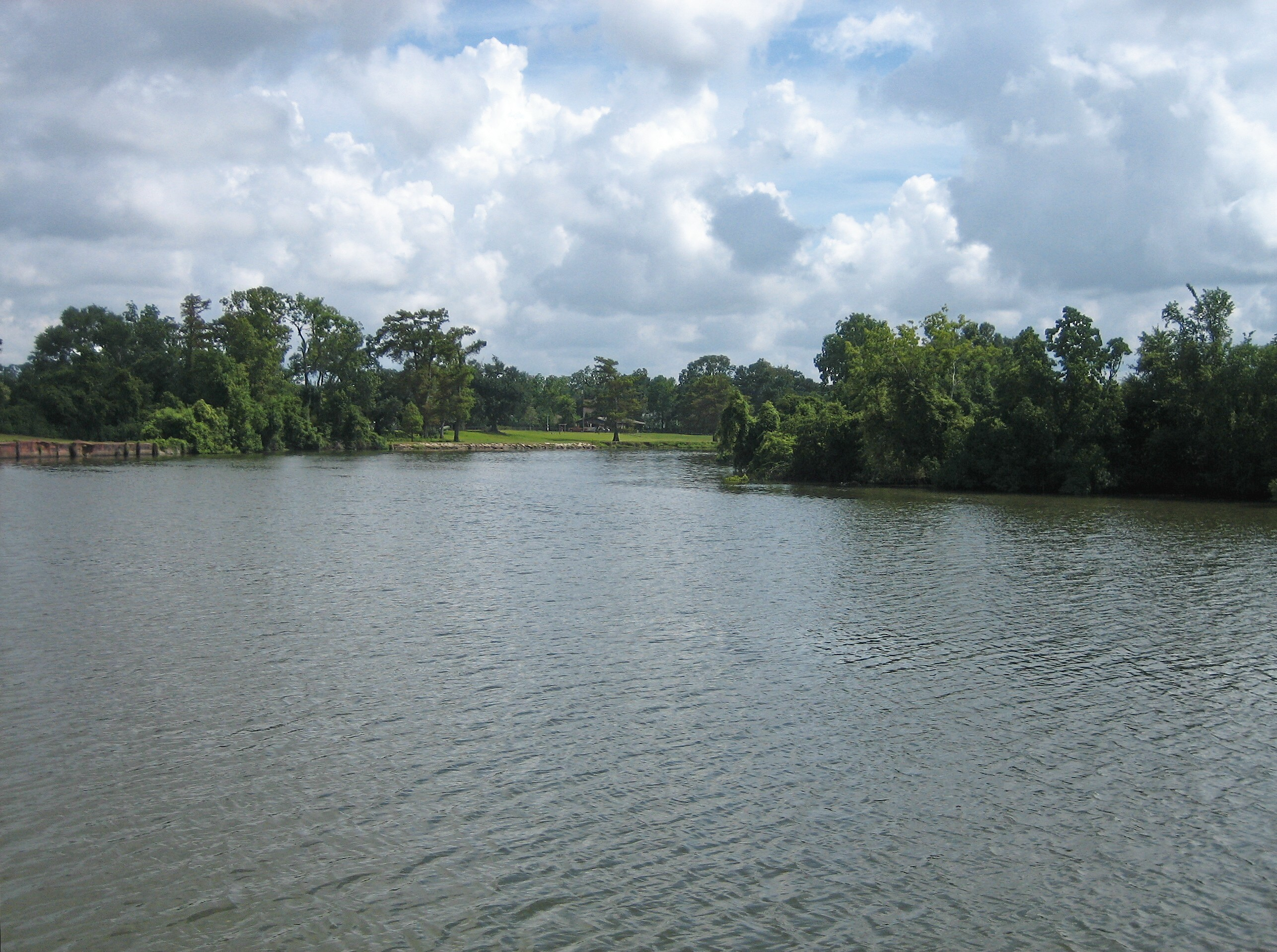
- Vermilion River in Abbeville.
- Vermilion River

Location
- Country: United States
- State: Louisiana
- Parishes: Lafayette; St. Martin; Vermilion

Physical characteristics
- Source: Confluence of unnamed bayous
  - location: Intersection of St. Landry, St. Martin, and Lafayette Parish boundaries
  - coordinates: 30°22′07″N 91°59′20″W
- Mouth: Vermilion Bay
  - location: Intracoastal City
  - coordinates: 29°45′54″N 92°09′14″W
- Length: 70 mi (110 km)

Basin features
- Cities: Lafayette; Abbeville; Intracoastal City

The Vermilion River, or the Bayou Vermilion (French: Rivière Vermillon), is a 70.0-mile-long (112.7 km) bayou in southern Louisiana in the United States. It is formed on the common boundary of Lafayette and St. Martin Parishes by a confluence of small bayous flowing from St. Landry Parish, and flows generally southward through Lafayette and Vermilion Parishes, past the cities of Lafayette and Abbeville. At the port of Intracoastal City, the Gulf Intracoastal Waterway crosses the river before the latter flows into Vermilion Bay, an inlet of the Gulf of Mexico. The river originates at Bayou Fusilier, which is fed by Bayou Teche; winds its way through Lafayette Parish; and drains into the Vermilion Bay below Vermilion Parish.

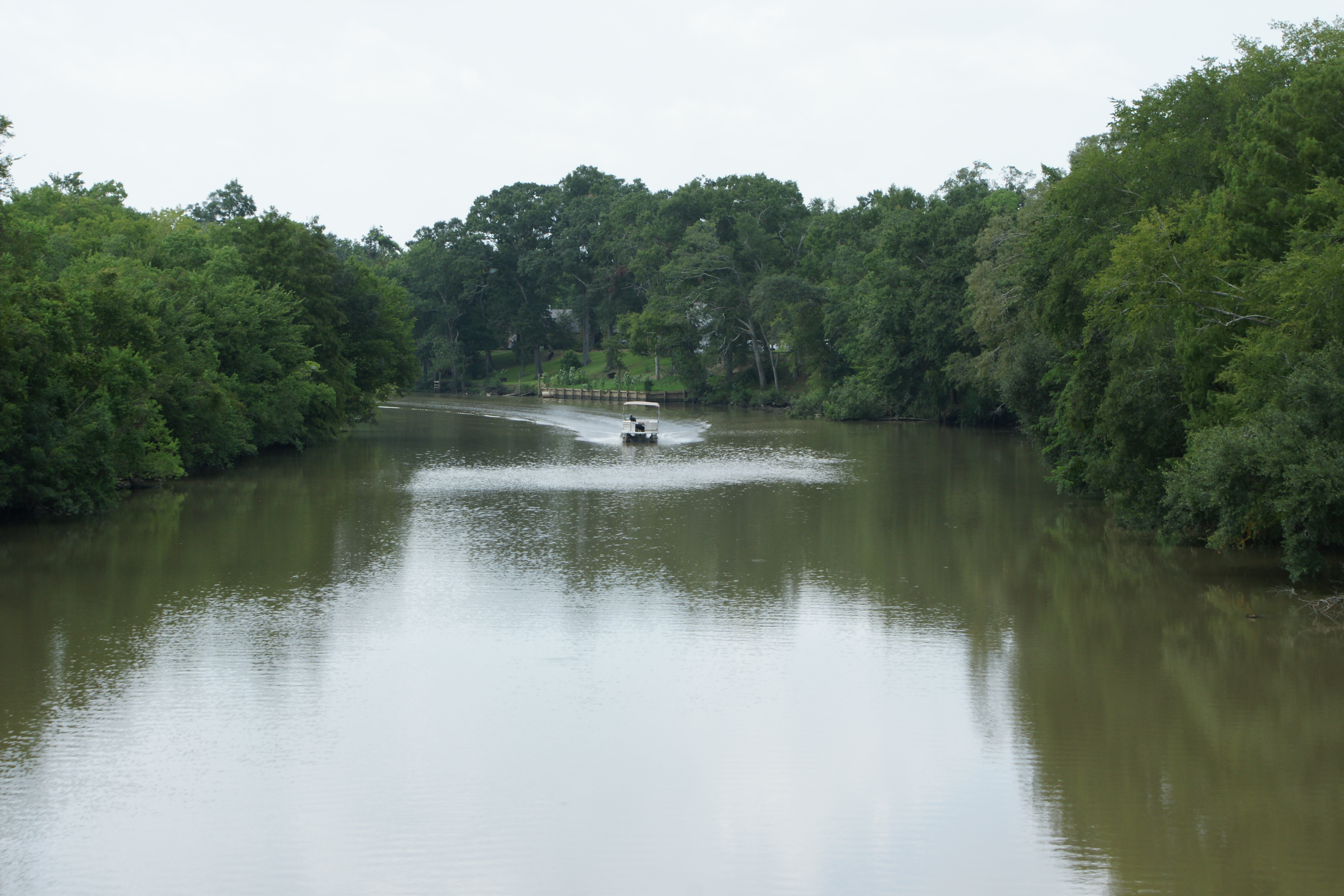
Vermilion River viewed from the Milton bridge.

The river is a "consequent stream" or a "tidal river," which means that the Vermilion was formed from the bottom up. The river was created by Vermilion Bay: tides and other natural actions in the bay slowly eroded the marshes and other features of the landscape as the river crept northward. The process brought the channel that would one day become the Vermilion River as far north as Lafayette, Louisiana. Much later, a distributary of Bayou Teche made its way south and eventually linked up with the consequent stream, forming a true north-south flowing river.

During times of heavy rain, parts of the Vermilion experience negative discharge, reverse direction, and flow north. At the Surrey Street stream gauge in Lafayette, Louisiana, the maximum historic positive discharge was 6,280 ft³/s on July 17, 1989. The maximum negative discharge, -11,300 ft³/s, occurred on August 13, 2016 during the 2016 Louisiana floods. The reverse-flow phenomenon occurs because the watershed areas in the city of Lafayette are highly developed. Rainfall runoff from the urban area enters the Vermilion River with larger volumes and at a faster rate than runoff upstream. That raises the water level in the Vermilion River along the southern areas of Lafayette. The rise in water levels sometimes exceeds the water level in reaches upstream of Lafayette, thus causing the reverse-flow effect. Also, when water levels in the Vermilion River exceed certain stages, water begins to enter the Bayou Tortue Swamp Area. The swamp has a great capacity to hold water, which also contributes to the reverse flow effect. The water from the Vermilion River enters Bayou Tortue Swamp through two coulees. Coulee Crow and Bayou Tortue are located upstream of the Surrey Street bridge on the Vermilion River.

In its early stage of development, the only point in the city that water transportation could be secured was at the site of the Pinhook Bridge. Consequently, property owners and businesses were located there. In later years, steamboats ran on the bayou. However, low water levels and submerged logs hampered their ability to travel.

The importance of the Vermilion as a means of transportation and commerce declined with the introduction of the railroad and the paving in 1936 of all highways leading into Lafayette. The Army Corps of Engineers also had a significant impact on Bayou Vermilion. Their dredging, completed in 1944, gave the bayou a depth of 9 feet (3 m) and a bottom width of 100 feet (30 m). Water from the Vermilion River is used primarily for rice irrigation and for the dilution of municipal and industrial chemicals and sewage.

A pumping station operated by the Teche-Vermilion Freshwater District was built on the Atchafalaya River West Protection Levee near Krotz Springs with the capacity to pump up to 1,040 cubic feet (29 m^{3}) of fresh water per second into Bayou Courtableu and eventually into the Vermilion River. The Teche-Vermilion Freshwater Project began in 1976 and was completed in 1982.

In the 1970s, the Vermilion gained a reputation as the most polluted river in the United States. Since then, improved sewage treatment, low flow streamflow augmentation, and regular in-stream trash collection have changed the public perception to that of a celebrated recreational resource. A Bayou Vermilion Paddle Trail map has been developed to facilitate and enhance the public’s enjoyment of Bayou Vermilion.

== Towns along the river ==
- Lafayette Parish
  - Stekey, Louisiana
  - Pont Des Mouton, Louisiana
  - Anse La Butte, Louisiana
  - Long Bridge, Louisiana
  - Lafayette, Louisiana
  - Milton, Louisiana
- Vermilion Parish
  - Abbeville, Louisiana
  - Perry, Louisiana
  - Rose Hill, Louisiana
  - Banker, Louisiana

== See also ==
- List of Louisiana rivers
