= Louisiana and Delta Railroad =

Overview
- Parent company: Genesee and Wyoming
- Headquarters: New Iberia, Louisiana
- Reporting mark: LDRR
- Locale: Louisiana
- Dates of operation: 1987–present

Technical
- Track gauge: 4 ft 8 1/2 in (1,435 mm) standard gauge
- Length: 165 mi (266 km)

Other
- Website: Official website

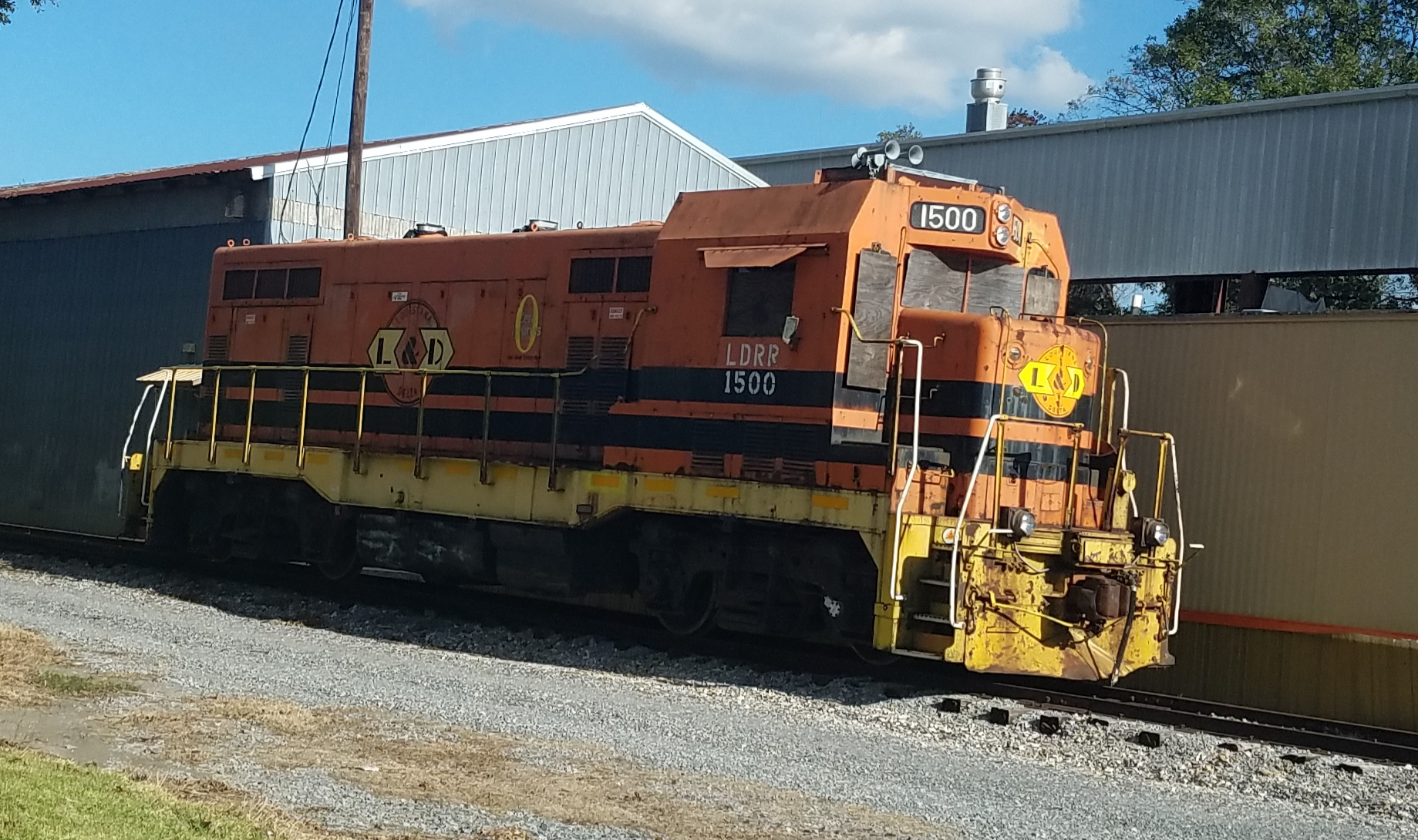
The Louisiana & Delta's only surviving ATSF CF7 locomotive, formerly LDRR 1500.

The Louisiana and Delta Railroad (reporting mark LDRR) is a short-line railroad headquartered in New Iberia, Louisiana.

LDRR operates over 165 miles (266 km) of branch line in southern Louisiana between Lafayette, Louisiana and Raceland, Louisiana, with most of the lines near US 90. LDRR operates via trackage rights on the BNSF Railway. LDRR traffic generally consists of bauxite ore, carbon black, fertilizer, molasses, oilfield supplies, paper products, pipe, sugar and rice.

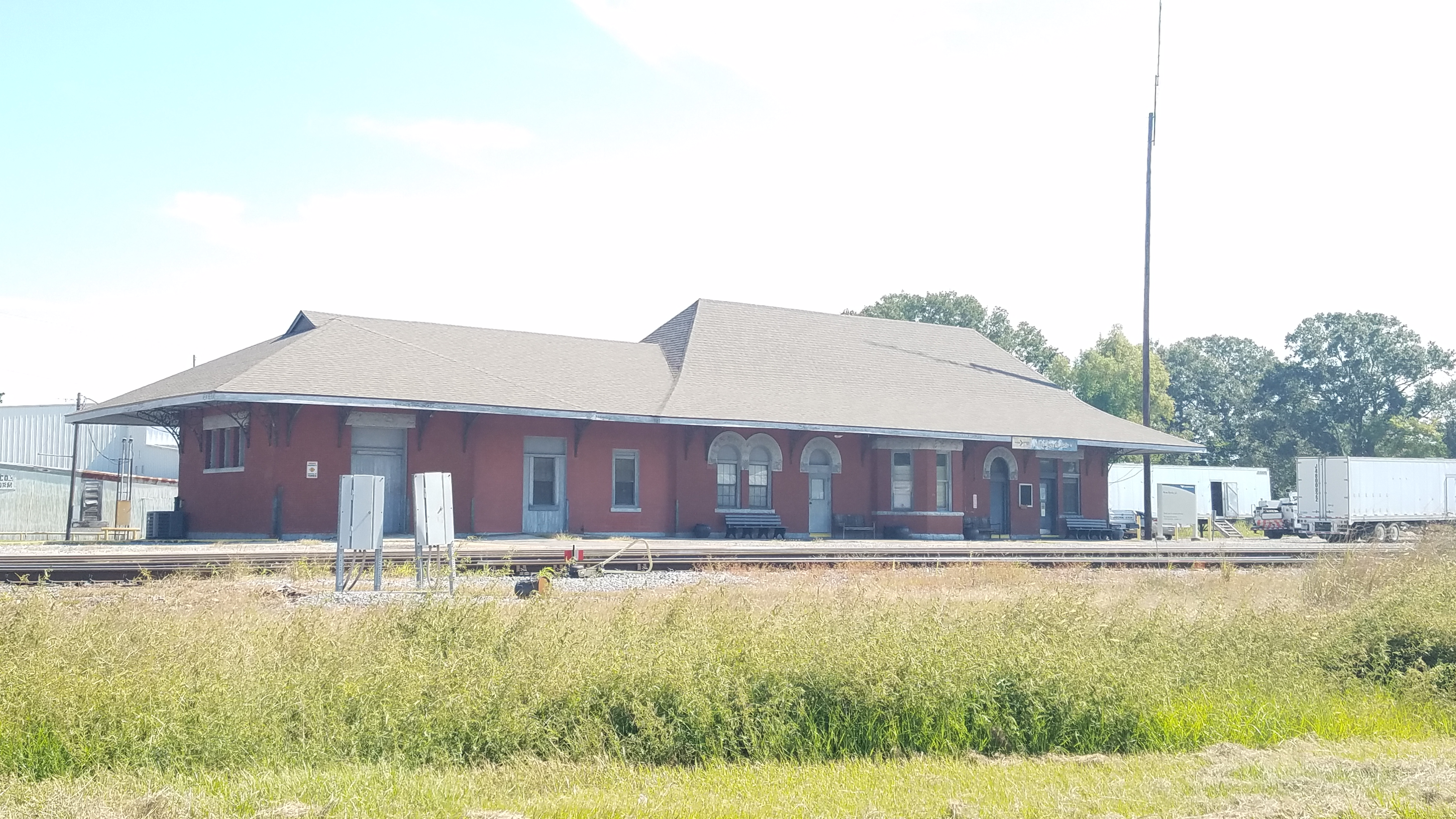
This is current Amtrak New Iberia Station, headquarters of the Louisiana & Delta railroad.

The railroad's current headquarters is at New Iberia station, formerly the Southern Pacific train station. There, you can find the building, a small yard, and further down a siding, the Locomotive Workshop.

The lines were built between 1880 and 1890. LDRR started in 1987 with the sale of seven Southern Pacific lines to Genesee and Wyoming. It has an all EMD locomotive fleet. EMD CF7s, GP10s, GP10-1s, GP38-2s, a single SW1200, a GP38, and a GP8 make up their active roster. As of July 2021, the roster is made up of 1 GP15-1 (1536), 7 GP10-1s (1702, 1703, 1707, 1708, 1709, 1850, and 1852), 3 GP8s (1710, 1712, and 1717), and 2 GP18-1s (1846 and 1847). Plus, 2 CF7s (1500 and 1504), are at the shops, with 1500 being in decent condition, and 1504 having its carbody and engine removed, plus other parts.

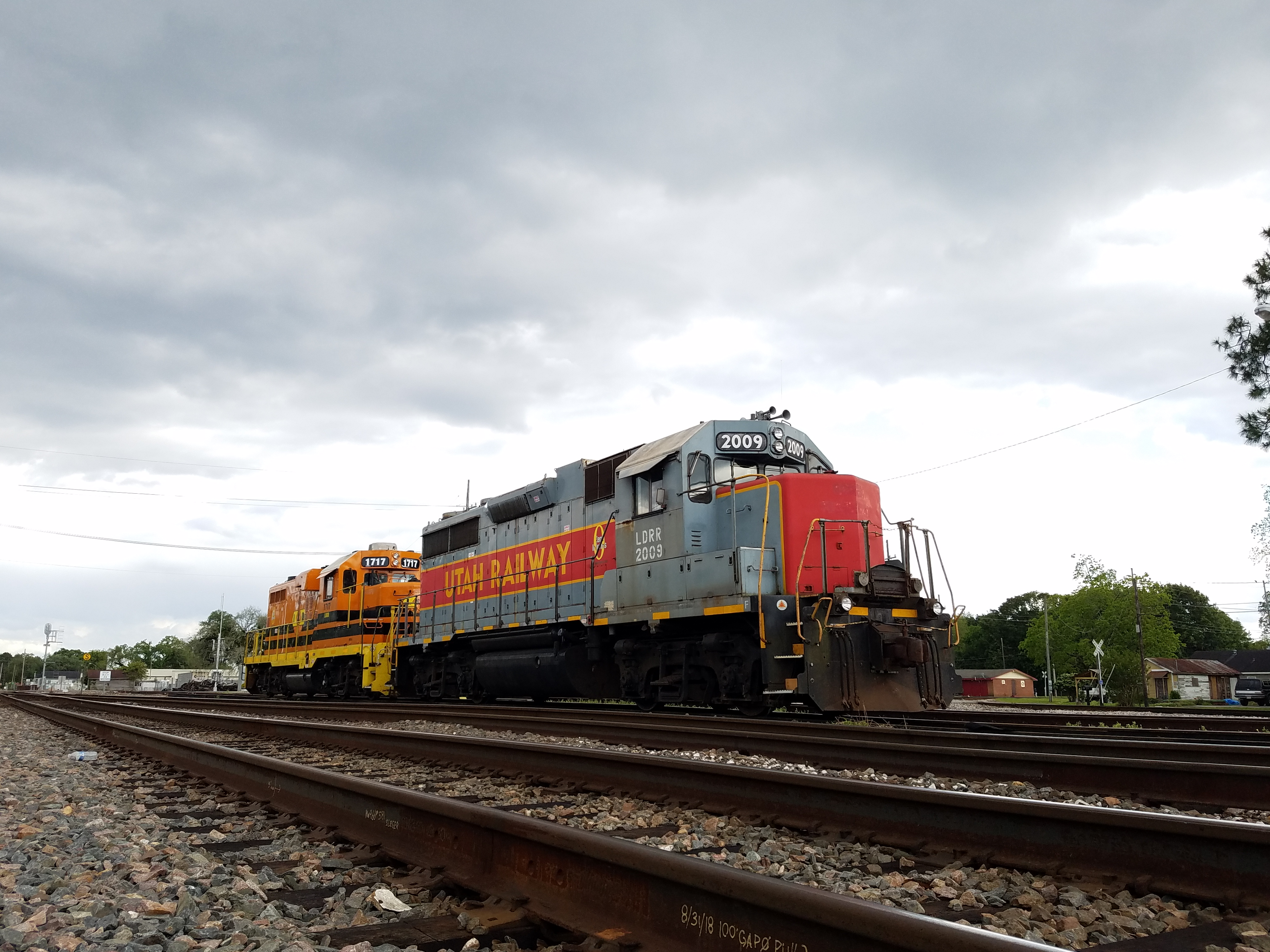
Louisiana & Delta GP38 and GP10

As of 2025, Genesee & Wyoming holds 165 miles. The Louisiana & Delta Railroad interchanges at a few locations. It interchanges with BNSF in Lafayette, Louisiana and Schriever, Louisiana, and with Union Pacific in New Iberia, Louisiana and Raceland, Louisiana. It can hold up to 263,000 pounds of supplies.
