= Abbeville Chris Crusta Memorial Airport =

- IATA: none; ICAO: KIYA; FAA LID: IYA

Summary
- Airport type: Public
- Owner: City of Abbeville
- Serves: Abbeville, Louisiana
- Elevation AMSL: 16 ft (4.9 m)
- Coordinates: 29°58′33″N 092°05′03″W
- Interactive map of Abbeville Chris Crusta Memorial Airport

Runways
Direction	Length		Surface
Direction	ft	m	Surface
16/34	5,000	1,524	Asphalt

Statistics (2022)
- Aircraft operations (year ending 5/20/2022): 91,595
- Based aircraft: 62
- Source: Federal Aviation Administration

Abbeville Chris Crusta Memorial Airport (ICAO: KIYA, FAA LID: IYA, formerly 0R3) is a city-owned, public-use airport located three nautical miles (4 mi, 6 km) east of the central business district of Abbeville, a city in Vermilion Parish, Louisiana, United States.

Although most U.S. airports use the same three-letter location identifier for the FAA and IATA, this airport is assigned IYA by the FAA but has no designation from the IATA.

== Facilities and aircraft ==
Abbeville Chris Crusta Memorial Airport covers an area of 216 acres (87 ha) at an elevation of 16 feet (5 m) above mean sea level. It has one runway designated 16/34 with an asphalt surface measuring 5,000 by 75 feet (1,524 x 23 m).

For the 12-month period ending May 20, 2022, the airport had 91,595 aircraft operations, an average of 251 per day: 53% air taxi, 47% general aviation and <1% military. At that time there were 62 aircraft based at this airport: 40 single-engine, 4 multi-engine, 1 jet, 16 helicopter, and 1 glider.

== See also ==
- List of airports in Louisiana
