= Perry, Louisiana =

Perry
- Census-designated place
- Location within Louisiana Location within the United States
- Coordinates: 29°57′07″N 92°09′14″W
- Country: United States
- State: Louisiana
- Parish: Vermilion
- Elevation: 7 ft (2.1 m)

Population (2020)
  - Total: 1,171
- Time zone: UTC-6 (Central (CST))
  - Summer (DST): UTC-5 (CDT)
- GNIS feature ID: 2805371

Perry (also Perrys Bridge, Pont Berry) is an unincorporated community and census-designated place in Vermilion Parish, Louisiana, United States. It was first listed as a CDP in the 2020 census with a population of 1,171.

== History ==
Perry's Bridge originated sometime after 1817, when Robert Perry was given a contract by the St. Martin Parish Police Jury to build a bridge across the river. By 1827, Perry, who was first appointed Sheriff of Vermilion Parish, serving 1844 to 1848, owned stores on each side of the river at Perry's Bridge, maintained a tannery there, and had other landholdings. In 1844, Perry laid out the little town.

== Demographics ==
Historical population
Census	Pop.	Note	%±
2020	1,171		—
U.S. Decennial Census; 2020

Perry was first listed as a census designated place in the 2020 U.S. census.

=== 2020 census ===
Perry CDP, Louisiana – Demographic Profile (NH = Non-Hispanic)
Race / Ethnicity	Pop 2020	% 2020
White alone (NH)	951	81.21%
Black or African American alone (NH)	79	6.75%
Native American or Alaska Native alone (NH)	2	0.17%
Asian alone (NH)	51	4.36%
Pacific Islander alone (NH)	0	0.00%
Some Other Race alone (NH)	1	0.09%
Mixed Race/Multi-Racial (NH)	26	2.22%
Hispanic or Latino (any race)	61	5.21%
Total	1,171	100.00%

Note: the US Census treats Hispanic/Latino as an ethnic category. This table excludes Latinos from the racial categories and assigns them to a separate category. Hispanics/Latinos can be of any race.
