= List of state highways in Louisiana (1100–1149) =

The following is a list of state highways in the U.S. state of Louisiana designated in the 1100–1149 range.

All are owned and maintained by the Louisiana Department of Transportation and Development (La DOTD) and were designated in the 1955 Louisiana Highway renumbering. All but three of the routes on this list are proposed for deletion as part of La DOTD's Road Transfer Program.

== Louisiana Highway 1100 ==
Louisiana Highway 1100
- Location: Acadia Parish
- Length: 2.124 mi (3.418 km)
- Existed: 1955–present

Louisiana Highway 1100 (LA 1100) runs 2.12 miles (3.41 km) in a north–south direction along Higginbotham Highway from LA 98 east of Castille to LA 95 south of Higginhotham. It is currently proposed for deletion as part of La DOTD's Road Transfer program.

The entire route is in Acadia Parish.

| mi | km | Destinations | Notes |
|---|---|---|---|
| 0.000 | 0.000 | LA 98 (Grand Prairie Highway) – Rayne, Carencro | Southern terminus |
| 2.124 | 3.418 | LA 95 (Higginbotham Highway, Mire Highway) – Church Point, Duson | Northern terminus |
1.000 mi = 1.609 km; 1.000 km = 0.621 mi

== Louisiana Highway 1101 ==
Louisiana Highway 1101
- Location: Acadia Parish
- Length: 4.299 mi (6.919 km)
- Existed: 1955–present

Louisiana Highway 1101 (LA 1101) runs 4.30 miles (6.92 km) in a north–south direction from LA 98 in Castille to LA 365 east of Branch. It is currently proposed for deletion as part of La DOTD's Road Transfer program.

The entire highway is in Acadia Parish.

| Location | mi | km | Destinations | Notes |
|---|---|---|---|---|
| Castille | 0.000 | 0.000 | LA 98 (Grand Prairie Highway) – Rayne, Carencro | Southern terminus |
| | 3.209 | 5.164 | LA 1102 west (J. E. Pelton Road) | Eastern terminus of LA 1102 |
| | 4.299 | 6.919 | LA 365 (Branch Highway) – Branch, Higginbotham | Northern terminus |
1.000 mi = 1.609 km; 1.000 km = 0.621 mi

== Louisiana Highway 1102 ==
Louisiana Highway 1102
- Location: Acadia Parish
- Length: 1.120 mi (1.802 km)
- Existed: 1955–present

Louisiana Highway 1102 (LA 1102) runs 1.12 miles (1.80 km) in an east–west direction along J. E. Pelton Road from LA 35 south of Branch to LA 1101 southeast of Branch. It is currently proposed for deletion as part of La DOTD's Road Transfer program.

The entire route is in Acadia Parish.

| mi | km | Destinations | Notes |
|---|---|---|---|
| 0.000 | 0.000 | LA 35 (Church Point Highway) – Church Point, Rayne | Western terminus |
| 1.120 | 1.802 | LA 1101 (J. E. Pelton Road, Castille Highway) | Eastern terminus |
1.000 mi = 1.609 km; 1.000 km = 0.621 mi

== Louisiana Highway 1103 ==
Louisiana Highway 1103
- Location: Acadia Parish
- Length: 3.1 mi (5.0 km)
- Existed: 1955–1961

Louisiana Highway 1103 (LA 1103) ran 3.1 miles (5.0 km) in a general north–south direction from LA 365 west of Higginbotham to LA 95 north of Higginbotham. It was transferred to local control in 1961.

The entire route was in Acadia Parish.

| mi | km | Destinations | Notes |
|---|---|---|---|
| 0.0 | 0.0 | LA 365 – Higginbotham, Branch | Southern terminus |
| 3.1 | 5.0 | LA 95 – Higginbotham, Church Point | Northern terminus |
1.000 mi = 1.609 km; 1.000 km = 0.621 mi

== Louisiana Highway 1104 ==
Louisiana Highway 1104
- Location: Church Point
- Length: 1.085 mi (1.746 km)
- Existed: 1955–present

Louisiana Highway 1104 (LA 1104) runs 1.09 miles (1.75 km) in a northwest to southeast direction along Old Sunset Road from LA 178 in Church Point to LA 754 east of Church Point. It is currently proposed for deletion as part of La DOTD's Road Transfer program.

The entire highway is in Acadia Parish.

| Location | mi | km | Destinations | Notes |
|---|---|---|---|---|
| Church Point | 0.000 | 0.000 | LA 178 (East Ebey Street) | Western terminus |
| | 1.085 | 1.746 | LA 754 (Deanne Highway) – Mire, Sunset | Eastern terminus |
1.000 mi = 1.609 km; 1.000 km = 0.621 mi

== Louisiana Highway 1105 ==
Louisiana Highway 1105
- Location: Acadia Parish
- Length: 5.686 mi (9.151 km)
- Existed: 1955–present

Louisiana Highway 1105 (LA 1105) runs 5.69 miles (9.16 km) in a general north–south direction from LA 367 southwest of Richard to LA 95 northwest of Church Point. It is currently proposed for deletion as part of La DOTD's Road Transfer program.

The entire highway is in Acadia Parish.

| Location | mi | km | Destinations | Notes |
|---|---|---|---|---|
| | 0.000 | 0.000 | LA 367 (White Oak Highway) – Eunice, Rayne | Southern terminus |
| Richard | 3.127 | 5.032 | LA 370 east / LA 1107 (Richard School Road) | Southern end of LA 370 concurrency; eastern terminus of LA 1107 |
| | 3.627 | 5.837 | LA 370 west (Academy Road) | Northern end of LA 370 concurrency |
| | 5.686 | 9.151 | LA 95 (Britany Highway, Prudhomme Road) – Church Point, Eunice | Northern terminus |
1.000 mi = 1.609 km; 1.000 km = 0.621 mi: Concurrency terminus

== Louisiana Highway 1106 ==
Louisiana Highway 1106
- Location: Acadia Parish
- Length: 2.004 mi (3.225 km)
- Existed: 1955–present

Louisiana Highway 1106 (LA 1106) runs 2.004 miles (3.225 km) in an east–west direction along Henry Bieber Road from Gumpoint Road to LA 367 southwest of Richard. The route's mileposts increase from the eastern end contrary to common practice. It is currently proposed for deletion as part of La DOTD's Road Transfer program.

The entire route is in Acadia Parish.

| mi | km | Destinations | Notes |
|---|---|---|---|
| 2.004 | 3.225 | Begin state maintenance at intersection of Henry Bieber Road and Gumpoint Road | Western terminus |
| 0.000 | 0.000 | LA 367 (White Oak Highway) – Eunice, Rayne | Eastern terminus |
1.000 mi = 1.609 km; 1.000 km = 0.621 mi

== Louisiana Highway 1107 ==
Louisiana Highway 1107
- Location: Richard
- Length: 1.054 mi (1.696 km)
- Existed: 1955–present

Louisiana Highway 1107 (LA 1107) runs 1.05 miles (1.69 km) in an east–west direction along Richard School Road from LA 367 west of Richard to the junction of LA 370 and LA 1105 at Richard. It is currently proposed for deletion as part of La DOTD's Road Transfer program.

The entire highway is in Acadia Parish.

| Location | mi | km | Destinations | Notes |
|---|---|---|---|---|
| | 0.000 | 0.000 | LA 367 (Bayou Mallet Highway) – Eunice, Rayne | Western terminus |
| Richard | 1.054 | 1.696 | LA 370 east (Richard School Road) LA 370 west / LA 1105 (Charlene Highway) | Eastern terminus |
1.000 mi = 1.609 km; 1.000 km = 0.621 mi

== Louisiana Highway 1108 ==
Louisiana Highway 1108
- Location: Acadia Parish
- Length: 2.634 mi (4.239 km)
- Existed: 1955–present

Louisiana Highway 1108 (LA 1108) runs 2.63 miles (4.23 km) in a north–south direction along Pitreville Highway from LA 95 northwest of Church Point to LA 358 at Pitreville. It is currently proposed for deletion as part of La DOTD's Road Transfer program.

| Parish | Location | mi | km | Destinations | Notes |
|---|---|---|---|---|---|
| Acadia | | 0.000 | 0.000 | LA 95 (Pitreville Highway, Britany Highway) – Church Point, Eunice | Southern terminus |
| Acadia–St. Landry parish line | Pitreville | 2.634 | 4.239 | LA 358 (Brigman Highway) | Northern terminus |
1.000 mi = 1.609 km; 1.000 km = 0.621 mi

== Louisiana Highway 1109 ==
Louisiana Highway 1109
- Location: Acadia Parish
- Length: 3.012 mi (4.847 km)
- Existed: 1955–present

Louisiana Highway 1109 (LA 1109) runs 3.01 miles (4.84 km) in a north–south direction from LA 98 east of Maxie to LA 365 northeast of Maxie. It is currently proposed for deletion as part of La DOTD's Road Transfer program.

The entire route is in Acadia Parish.

| mi | km | Destinations | Notes |
|---|---|---|---|
| 0.000 | 0.000 | LA 98 (Roberts Cove Road) – Maxie, Iota | Southern terminus |
| 3.012 | 4.847 | LA 365 (Branch Highway) – Branch, Higginbotham | Northern terminus |
1.000 mi = 1.609 km; 1.000 km = 0.621 mi

== Louisiana Highway 1110 ==
Louisiana Highway 1110
- Location: Acadia Parish
- Length: 2.906 mi (4.677 km)
- Existed: 1955–present

Louisiana Highway 1110 (LA 1110) runs 2.91 miles (4.68 km) in a southwest to northeast direction along Providence Highway from LA 98 east of Maxie to LA 367 at Link. It is currently proposed for deletion as part of La DOTD's Road Transfer program.

The entire highway is in Acadia Parish.

| Location | mi | km | Destinations | Notes |
|---|---|---|---|---|
| | 0.000 | 0.000 | LA 98 (Roberts Cove Road) – Maxie, Rayne | Western terminus |
| Link | 2.906 | 4.677 | LA 367 (White Oak Highway) – Rayne, Eunice | Eastern terminus |
1.000 mi = 1.609 km; 1.000 km = 0.621 mi

== Louisiana Highway 1111 ==
Louisiana Highway 1111
- Location: Crowley
- Length: 6.009 mi (9.671 km)
- Existed: 1955–present

Louisiana Highway 1111 (LA 1111) runs 6.01 miles (9.67 km) in a southwest to northeast direction from LA 13 in Crowley to LA 98 west of Roberts Cove. The route has a spur that consists of two road sections forming a Y-intersection with US 90. The majority of mainline LA 1111 is currently proposed for deletion as part of La DOTD's Road Transfer program. A transfer agreement is pending for the east–west portion parallel to I-10.

The entire highway is in Acadia Parish.

| Location | mi | km | Destinations | Notes |
|---|---|---|---|---|
| Crowley | 0.000– 0.009 | 0.000– 0.014 | LA 13 (North Parkerson Avenue) – Crowley, Eunice LA 13 Truck begins | Southern terminus of LA 1111; northern terminus of LA 13 Truck; southern end of LA 13 Truck concurrency |
| Crowley | 1.194 | 1.922 | LA 13 Truck south / LA 1111 Spur (Tower Road) to US 90 west LA 1111 Spur (Odd Fellows Road) to US 90 east | Northern end of LA 13 Truck concurrency |
| Crowley | 1.265– 1.782 | 2.036– 2.868 | I-10 – Lafayette, Lake Charles | Exit 82 on I-10 |
| | 6.009 | 9.671 | LA 98 (Roberts Cove Road) – Rayne, Eunice | Northern terminus |
1.000 mi = 1.609 km; 1.000 km = 0.621 mi

== Louisiana Highway 1112 ==
Louisiana Highway 1112
- Location: Acadia Parish
- Length: 3.021 mi (4.862 km)
- Existed: 1955–2018

Louisiana Highway 1112 (LA 1112) ran 3.02 miles (4.86 km) along Bayou Plaquemine Road in a loop off of LA 1111 north of Crowley. It was transferred to local control as part of the La DOTD Road Transfer program in 2018.

The entire route was in Acadia Parish.

| mi | km | Destinations | Notes |
|---|---|---|---|
| 0.000 | 0.000 | LA 1111 (Tower Road) | Southern terminus |
| 3.021 | 4.862 | LA 1111 (Bayou Plaquemine Road, Tower Road) | Northern terminus |
1.000 mi = 1.609 km; 1.000 km = 0.621 mi

== Louisiana Highway 1113 ==
Louisiana Highway 1113
- Location: Roberts Cove
- Length: 1.283 mi (2.065 km)
- Existed: 1955–present

Louisiana Highway 1113 (LA 1113) runs 1.28 miles (2.06 km) in a north–south direction from LA 98 at Roberts Cove to LA 367 northeast of Roberts Cove. The route has a spur that travels 0.35 miles (0.56 km) along Wabash Road from LA 1113 to LA 98 northwest of Roberts Cove. Both LA 1113 and its spur are currently proposed for deletion as part of La DOTD's Road Transfer program.

The entire highway is in Acadia Parish.

| Location | mi | km | Destinations | Notes |
|---|---|---|---|---|
| Roberts Cove | 0.000 | 0.000 | LA 98 (Roberts Cove Road) – Rayne, Maxie | Southern terminus |
| | 0.414 | 0.666 | LA 1113 Spur (Wabash Road) | Eastern terminus of LA 1113 Spur |
| | 1.283 | 2.065 | LA 367 (White Oak Highway) – Rayne, Eunice | Northern terminus |
1.000 mi = 1.609 km; 1.000 km = 0.621 mi

== Louisiana Highway 1114 ==
Louisiana Highway 1114
- Location: Acadia Parish
- Length: 2.0 mi (3.2 km)
- Existed: 1955–c. 1957

Louisiana Highway 1114 (LA 1114) ran 2.0 miles (3.2 km) in an east–west direction from a local road to LA 13 south of Lyons Point. It was transferred to local control by 1958.

The entire route was in Acadia Parish.

| mi | km | Destinations | Notes |
|---|---|---|---|
| 0.0 | 0.0 | Begin state maintenance | Western terminus |
| 2.0 | 3.2 | LA 13 – Kaplan, Crowley | Eastern terminus |
1.000 mi = 1.609 km; 1.000 km = 0.621 mi

== Louisiana Highway 1115 ==
Louisiana Highway 1115
- Location: Morse–Lyons Point
- Length: 8.830 mi (14.211 km)
- Existed: 1955–present

Louisiana Highway 1115 (LA 1115) runs 8.83 miles (14.21 km) in an east–west direction along Lyons Point Highway from LA 91 south of Morse to LA 13 east of Lyons Point. It is currently proposed for deletion as part of La DOTD's Road Transfer program.

The entire route is in Acadia Parish.

| mi | km | Destinations | Notes |
|---|---|---|---|
| 0.000 | 0.000 | LA 91 (South Jackson Avenue) – Midland, Gueydan | Western terminus; 0.04 miles (0.064 km) south of Morse |
| 8.830 | 14.211 | LA 13 – Kaplan, Crowley | Eastern terminus |
1.000 mi = 1.609 km; 1.000 km = 0.621 mi

== Louisiana Highway 1116 ==
Louisiana Highway 1116
- Location: Acadia Parish
- Length: 2.8 mi (4.5 km)
- Existed: 1955–c. 1957

Louisiana Highway 1116 (LA 1116) ran 2.8 miles (4.5 km) in a north–south direction from a local road southwest of Crowley to US 90 west of Crowley. It was transferred to local control by 1958.

The entire route was in Acadia Parish.

| mi | km | Destinations | Notes |
|---|---|---|---|
| 0.0 | 0.0 | Begin state maintenance | Southern terminus |
| 2.8 | 4.5 | US 90 – Crowley, Estherwood | Northern terminus |
1.000 mi = 1.609 km; 1.000 km = 0.621 mi

== Louisiana Highway 1117 ==
Louisiana Highway 1117
- Location: Mermentau–Estherwood
- Length: 6.0 mi (9.7 km)
- Existed: 1955–1963

Louisiana Highway 1117 (LA 1117) ran 6.0 miles (9.7 km) in an east–west direction along Old Spanish Trail from LA 92 east of Mermentau to US 90 in Estherwood. It was transferred to local control in 1963.

The entire highway was in Acadia Parish.

| Location | mi | km | Destinations | Notes |
|---|---|---|---|---|
| | 0.0 | 0.0 | LA 92 – Mermentau, Morse | Western terminus |
| Estherwood | 6.0 | 9.7 | US 90 – Midland, Crowley | Eastern terminus |
1.000 mi = 1.609 km; 1.000 km = 0.621 mi

== Louisiana Highway 1118 ==
Louisiana Highway 1118
- Location: Acadia Parish
- Length: 1.7 mi (2.7 km)
- Existed: 1955–1963

Louisiana Highway 1118 (LA 1118) ran 1.7 miles (2.7 km) in a north–south direction from a local road to LA 1117 west of Midland. It was transferred to local control in 1963.

The entire route was in Acadia Parish.

| mi | km | Destinations | Notes |
|---|---|---|---|
| 0.0 | 0.0 | Begin state maintenance | Southern terminus |
| 1.7 | 2.7 | LA 1117 (Old Spanish Trail) | Northern terminus |
1.000 mi = 1.609 km; 1.000 km = 0.621 mi

== Louisiana Highway 1119 ==
Louisiana Highway 1119
- Location: Acadia Parish
- Length: 1.006 mi (1.619 km)
- Existed: 1955–present

Louisiana Highway 1119 (LA 1119) runs 1.01 miles (1.63 km) in a north–south direction along Vincent Road from Legros Road to LA 92 south of Mermentau. The route's mileposts increase from the northern end contrary to common practice.

LA 1119 begins at a T-intersection with Legros Road, a local road. It heads north on Vincent Road to a point on LA 92 located about two miles (3.2 km) south of the village of Mermentau. At this junction, LA 92 turns east from Mermentau Cove Road onto West Whitney Street. LA 1119 is an undivided two-lane highway for its entire length.

In the pre-1955 state highway system, LA 1119 was designated as State Route C-1566. LA 1119 was created in the 1955 Louisiana Highway renumbering, and its route has remained the same to the present day. It is currently proposed for deletion as part of La DOTD's Road Transfer program.

The entire route is in Acadia Parish.

| mi | km | Destinations | Notes |
|---|---|---|---|
| 1.006 | 1.619 | Begin state maintenance at Legros Road | Southern terminus |
| 0.000 | 0.000 | LA 92 (Mermentau Cove Road, West Whitney Street) – Mermentau, Morse | Northern terminus |
1.000 mi = 1.609 km; 1.000 km = 0.621 mi

== Louisiana Highway 1120 ==
Louisiana Highway 1120
- Location: Acadia Parish
- Length: 6.208 mi (9.991 km)
- Existed: 1955–present

Louisiana Highway 1120 (LA 1120) runs 6.21 miles (9.99 km) in a north–south direction from the junction of LA 91 and LA 100 east of Egan to LA 98 east of Iota. The route's mileposts increase from the northern end contrary to common practice. It is currently proposed for deletion as part of La DOTD's Road Transfer program.

The entire route is in Acadia Parish.

| mi | km | Destinations | Notes |
|---|---|---|---|
| 6.208 | 9.991 | LA 91 north / LA 100 (Egan Highway) – Egan, Crowley LA 91 south (Estherwood Highway) to I-10 | Southern terminus |
| 0.000 | 0.000 | LA 98 (Maxie Highway) – Iota | Northern terminus |
1.000 mi = 1.609 km; 1.000 km = 0.621 mi

== Louisiana Highway 1121 ==
Louisiana Highway 1121
- Location: Acadia Parish
- Length: 1.517 mi (2.441 km)
- Existed: 1955–present

Louisiana Highway 1121 (LA 1121) runs 1.52 miles (2.45 km) in a north–south direction from LA 100 at Lawson to LA 13 north of Crowley.

The route begins on LA 100, which closely follows the north side of I-10 between Crowley and Egan. From this junction, located about one mile (1.6 km) west of the Crowley city limit, LA 1121 heads north on Oro Trail Road and proceeds to a junction with LA 13 north of town. LA 1121 is an undivided two-lane highway for its entire length.

In the pre-1955 state highway system, LA 1121 was designated as State Route 26-D. LA 1121 was created in the 1955 Louisiana Highway renumbering, and its route has remained the same to the present day. The main purpose was served for a quicker route for LA-100 users to merge onto North LA-13, but it is now currently proposed for deletion as part of La DOTD's Road Transfer program.

The entire highway is in Acadia Parish.

| Location | mi | km | Destinations | Notes |
|---|---|---|---|---|
| Lawson | 0.000 | 0.000 | LA 100 (Egan Highway) – Crowley, Egan | Southern terminus |
| | 1.517 | 2.441 | LA 13 (Crowley-Eunice Highway) – Crowley, Eunice | Northern terminus |
1.000 mi = 1.609 km; 1.000 km = 0.621 mi

== Louisiana Highway 1122 ==
Louisiana Highway 1122
- Location: Acadia Parish
- Length: 7.2 mi (11.6 km)
- Existed: 1955–1961

Louisiana Highway 1122 (LA 1122) ran 7.2 miles (11.6 km) in an east–west direction from LA 91 south of Iota to LA 13 at Ellis. It was transferred to local control in 1961.

The entire highway was in Acadia Parish.

| Location | mi | km | Destinations | Notes |
|---|---|---|---|---|
| | 0.0 | 0.0 | LA 91 – Iota, Egan | Western terminus |
| | 1.6 | 2.6 | LA 1120 | |
| Ellis | 7.2 | 11.6 | LA 13 – Crowley, Eunice | Eastern terminus |
1.000 mi = 1.609 km; 1.000 km = 0.621 mi

== Louisiana Highway 1123 ==
Louisiana Highway 1123
- Location: Acadia Parish
- Length: 5.582 mi (8.983 km)
- Existed: 1955–present

Louisiana Highway 1123 (LA 1123) runs 5.58 miles (8.98 km) in a general north–south direction from the junction of LA 97 and LA 98 west of Iota to a second junction with LA 97 northwest of Iota. It is currently proposed for deletion as part of La DOTD's Road Transfer program.

The entire route is in Acadia Parish.

| mi | km | Destinations | Notes |
|---|---|---|---|
| 0.000 | 0.000 | LA 97 (Evangeline Highway) – Jennings, Basile LA 98 east (Des Cannes Highway) – Iota | Southern terminus |
| 5.582 | 8.983 | LA 97 (Evangeline Highway) – Basile, Evangeline | Northern terminus |
1.000 mi = 1.609 km; 1.000 km = 0.621 mi

== Louisiana Highway 1124 ==
Louisiana Highway 1124
- Location: Estherwood
- Length: 3.863 mi (6.217 km)
- Existed: 1955–present

Louisiana Highway 1124 (LA 1124) runs 3.86 miles (6.21 km) in a north–south direction along South Leblanc Street from LA 92 east of Morse to US 90 in Estherwood. It is currently proposed for deletion as part of La DOTD's Road Transfer program.

The entire highway is in Acadia Parish.

| Location | mi | km | Destinations | Notes |
|---|---|---|---|---|
| | 0.000 | 0.000 | LA 92 (East Whitney Street) – Morse, Indian Bayou | Southern terminus |
| Estherwood | 3.863 | 6.217 | US 90 (Front Avenue) – Crowley, Mermentau | Northern terminus |
1.000 mi = 1.609 km; 1.000 km = 0.621 mi

== Louisiana Highway 1125 ==
Louisiana Highway 1125
- Location: Jefferson Davis Parish
- Length: 2.8 mi (4.5 km)
- Existed: 1955–1963

Louisiana Highway 1125 (LA 1125) ran 2.8 miles (4.5 km) in an east–west direction from a local road to a junction with LA 99 south of Welsh. It was transferred to local control in 1963.

The entire route was in Jefferson Davis Parish.

| mi | km | Destinations | Notes |
|---|---|---|---|
| 0.0 | 0.0 | Begin state maintenance | Western terminus |
| 2.8 | 4.5 | LA 99 – Welsh, Lake Arthur | Eastern terminus |
1.000 mi = 1.609 km; 1.000 km = 0.621 mi

== Louisiana Highway 1126 ==
Louisiana Highway 1126
- Location: Jefferson Davis Parish
- Length: 12.202 mi (19.637 km)
- Existed: 1955–present

Louisiana Highway 1126 (LA 1126) runs 12.20 miles (19.63 km) in an east–west direction from LA 99 south of Welsh to US 90 southeast of Jennings. The portion east of LA 26 is currently proposed for deletion as part of La DOTD's Road Transfer program.

The route primarily follows a rural section line road south of and parallel to US 90. It has a brief concurrency with LA 26, which connects with Jennings to the north and Lake Arthur to the south. LA 1126 is an undivided two-lane highway for its entire length.

The entire route is in Jefferson Davis Parish.

| mi | km | Destinations | Notes |
|---|---|---|---|
| 0.000 | 0.000 | LA 99 – Welsh | Western terminus |
| 2.545 | 4.096 | LA 382 | |
| 8.914 | 14.346 | LA 26 south – Lake Arthur | Western end of LA 26 concurrency |
| 9.218 | 14.835 | LA 26 north – Jennings | Eastern end of LA 26 concurrency |
| 9.843 | 15.841 | LA 102 – Jennings | |
| 11.351 | 18.268 | LA 3166 | Northern terminus of LA 3166 |
| 12.202 | 19.637 | US 90 – Jennings, Mermentau | Eastern terminus |
1.000 mi = 1.609 km; 1.000 km = 0.621 mi: Concurrency terminus

== Louisiana Highway 1127 ==
Louisiana Highway 1127
- Location: Jefferson Davis Parish
- Length: 6.8 mi (10.9 km)
- Existed: 1955–1963

Louisiana Highway 1127 (LA 1127) ran 6.8 miles (10.9 km) in a north–south direction from a local road southeast of Roanoke to LA 395 north of Roanoke. It was transferred to local control in 1963.

The entire route was in Jefferson Davis Parish.

| mi | km | Destinations | Notes |
|---|---|---|---|
| 0.0 | 0.0 | Begin state maintenance | Southern terminus |
| 1.7 | 2.7 | US 90 – Roanoke, Jennings | |
| 6.8 | 10.9 | LA 99 – Welsh, Lake Arthur | Northern terminus |
1.000 mi = 1.609 km; 1.000 km = 0.621 mi

== Louisiana Highway 1128 ==
Louisiana Highway 1128
- Location: Panchoville
- Length: 1.5 mi (2.4 km)
- Existed: 1955–1973

Louisiana Highway 1128 (LA 1128) ran 1.5 miles (2.4 km) in a general north–south direction from LA 102 east of Hathaway to a local road at Panchoville. It was transferred to local control in 1973.

The entire highway was in Jefferson Davis Parish.

| Location | mi | km | Destinations | Notes |
|---|---|---|---|---|
| | 0.0 | 0.0 | LA 102 – Hathaway, Jennings | Southern terminus |
| Panchoville | 1.5 | 2.4 | End state maintenance | Northern terminus |
1.000 mi = 1.609 km; 1.000 km = 0.621 mi

== Louisiana Highway 1129 ==
Louisiana Highway 1129
- Location: St. Tammany Parish
- Length: 5.368 mi (8.639 km)
- Existed: 1955–present

Louisiana Highway 1129 (LA 1129) runs 5.37 miles (8.64 km) in a north–south direction along Lee Road from LA 40 to Louisiana Tung Road north of Covington. It is currently proposed for deletion as part of La DOTD's Road Transfer program.

The entire route is in St. Tammany Parish.

| mi | km | Destinations | Notes |
|---|---|---|---|
| 0.000 | 0.000 | LA 40 (Lee Road) – Covington, Folsom | Southern terminus |
| 5.368 | 8.639 | End state maintenance at intersection of Lee Road and Louisiana Tung Road | Northern terminus |
1.000 mi = 1.609 km; 1.000 km = 0.621 mi

== Louisiana Highway 1130 ==
Louisiana Highway 1130
- Location: Elton
- Length: 1.491 mi (2.400 km)
- Existed: 1955–present

Louisiana Highway 1130 (LA 1130) runs 1.49 miles (2.40 km) in an east–west direction from US 190 in Elton to LA 26 east of Elton. It is currently proposed for deletion as part of La DOTD's Road Transfer program.

The entire highway is in Jefferson Davis Parish.

| Location | mi | km | Destinations | Notes |
|---|---|---|---|---|
| Elton | 0.000 | 0.000 | US 190 (Main Street) | Western terminus |
| | 1.491 | 2.400 | LA 26 – Oberlin, Jennings | Eastern terminus |
1.000 mi = 1.609 km; 1.000 km = 0.621 mi

== Louisiana Highway 1131 ==
Louisiana Highway 1131
- Location: Jefferson Davis Parish
- Length: 3.081 mi (4.958 km)
- Existed: 1955–present

Louisiana Highway 1131 (LA 1131) runs 3.08 miles (4.96 km) in a north–south direction from a local road southwest of Welsh to a junction with US 90 west of Welsh. The route's mileposts increase from the northern end contrary to common practice. It is currently proposed for deletion as part of La DOTD's Road Transfer program.

The entire route is in Jefferson Davis Parish.

| mi | km | Destinations | Notes |
|---|---|---|---|
| 3.081 | 4.958 | Begin state maintenance at intersection of Simons Road and Ardoin Cove Road | Southern terminus |
| 0.000 | 0.000 | US 90 – Welsh, Lacassine | Northern terminus |
1.000 mi = 1.609 km; 1.000 km = 0.621 mi

== Louisiana Highway 1132 ==
Louisiana Highway 1132
- Location: Jefferson Davis Parish
- Length: 1.8 mi (2.9 km)
- Existed: 1955–1961

Louisiana Highway 1132 (LA 1132) ran 1.8 miles (2.9 km) in an east–west direction from LA 26 to a local road south of Jennings. It was transferred to local control in 1961.

The entire route was in Jefferson Davis Parish.

| mi | km | Destinations | Notes |
|---|---|---|---|
| 0.0 | 0.0 | LA 26 – Jennings, Lake Arthur | Western terminus |
| 1.0 | 1.6 | LA 102 – Jennings, Lake Arthur | |
| 1.8 | 2.9 | End state maintenance | Eastern terminus |
1.000 mi = 1.609 km; 1.000 km = 0.621 mi

== Louisiana Highway 1133 ==
Louisiana Highway 1133
- Location: Calcasieu Parish
- Length: 4.278 mi (6.885 km)
- Existed: 1955–present

Louisiana Highway 1133 (LA 1133) runs 4.28 miles (6.89 km) in a general north–south direction from the junction of LA 27 and LA 108 to a second junction with LA 108 in Carlyss. It is currently proposed for deletion as part of La DOTD's Road Transfer program.

The entire highway is in Carlyss, Calcasieu Parish.

| mi | km | Destinations | Notes |
|---|---|---|---|
| 0.000 | 0.000 | LA 27 / LA 108 – Sulphur, Hackberry | Southern terminus |
| 4.269– 4.278 | 6.870– 6.885 | LA 108 – Sulphur | Northern terminus |
1.000 mi = 1.609 km; 1.000 km = 0.621 mi

== Louisiana Highway 1134 ==
Louisiana Highway 1134
- Location: Calcasieu Parish
- Length: 3.5 mi (5.6 km)
- Existed: 1955–1962

Louisiana Highway 1134 (LA 1134) ran 3.5 miles (5.6 km) in a north–south direction from LA 108 south of Hollywood to US 90 in Maplewood. It was transferred to local control in 1962.

The entire highway is in Calcasieu Parish.

| Location | mi | km | Destinations | Notes |
|---|---|---|---|---|
| | 0.0 | 0.0 | LA 108 | Southern terminus |
| Maplewood | 3.5 | 5.6 | US 90 – Sulphur, Lake Charles | Northern terminus |
1.000 mi = 1.609 km; 1.000 km = 0.621 mi

== Louisiana Highway 1135 ==
Louisiana Highway 1135
- Location: Calcasieu Parish
- Length: 4.1 mi (6.6 km)
- Existed: 1955–1962

Louisiana Highway 1135 (LA 1135) ran 4.1 miles (6.6 km) in a southwest to northeast direction in a loop off of LA 384 south of Lake Charles. It was transferred to local control in 1962.

The entire route was in Calcasieu Parish.

| mi | km | Destinations | Notes |
|---|---|---|---|
| 0.0 | 0.0 | LA 384 – Lake Charles, Grand Lake | Southwestern terminus |
| 4.1 | 6.6 | LA 384 – Lake Charles, Grand Lake | Northeastern terminus |
1.000 mi = 1.609 km; 1.000 km = 0.621 mi

== Louisiana Highway 1136 ==
Louisiana Highway 1136
- Location: Calcasieu Parish
- Length: 6.1 mi (9.8 km)
- Existed: 1955–1963

Louisiana Highway 1136 (LA 1136) ran 6.1 miles (9.8 km) in a northwest to southeast direction from LA 385 at Prairieland to LA 397 southwest of Holmwood. It was transferred to local control in 1963.

The entire highway was in Calcasieu Parish.

| Location | mi | km | Destinations | Notes |
|---|---|---|---|---|
| Prairieland | 0.0 | 0.0 | LA 385 – Grand Lake, Lake Charles | Northwestern terminus |
| | 6.1 | 9.8 | LA 397 | Southeastern terminus |
1.000 mi = 1.609 km; 1.000 km = 0.621 mi

== Louisiana Highway 1137 ==
Louisiana Highway 1137
- Location: Sabine Parish
- Length: 4.7 mi (7.6 km)
- Existed: 1955–c. 1957

Louisiana Highway 1137 (LA 1137) ran 4.7 miles (7.6 km) in a north–south direction from LA 473 north of Toro to a local road at Rattan. It was transferred to local control by 1958, but the southern portion later became part of LA 191.

The entire highway was in Sabine Parish.

| Location | mi | km | Destinations | Notes |
|---|---|---|---|---|
| | 0.0 | 0.0 | LA 473 – Toro, Hornbeck | Southern terminus |
| Rattan | 4.7 | 7.6 | End state maintenance | Northern terminus |
1.000 mi = 1.609 km; 1.000 km = 0.621 mi

== Louisiana Highway 1138 ==
Louisiana Highway 1138
- Location: Lake Charles
- Length: 4.875 mi (7.846 km)
- Existed: 1955–present

Louisiana Highway 1138 (LA 1138) consists of three road segments with a total length of 4.88 miles (7.85 km) that are located in the Calcasieu Parish city of Lake Charles. Approximately half the mileage is currently proposed for deletion as part of La DOTD's Road Transfer program.

- LA 1138-1 runs 0.416 miles (0.669 km) along Nelson Road from LA 1138-2 to a point just beyond the entrance to L'Auberge Casino Resort.
- LA 1138-2 runs 3.847 miles (6.191 km) along Nelson Road from LA 384 north to LA 1138-1, then east along West Prien Lake Road to LA 385.
- LA 1138-3 runs 0.612 miles (0.985 km) along Legion Street from LA 14 (Gerstner Memorial Drive) to I-210.

Routes deleted since the 1955 Louisiana Highway renumbering include:

- LA 1138-1 formerly ran 0.3 miles (0.48 km) along Harrison Street from the I-10/US 90 frontage road south of Westlake to LA 379 in Westlake. It was transferred to local control in 1964, and its designation was given to the current route in 2009.
- LA 1138-4 ran 0.8 miles (1.3 km) along Moeling Street from North Prater Street to US 171 in Lake Charles. It was transferred to local control in 1975.
- LA 1138-5 ran 1.2 miles (1.9 km) along North Simmons, Medora, and Graham Streets from LA 1138-4 (Moeling Street) to US 171 in Lake Charles. It was transferred to local control in 1975.

== Louisiana Highway 1139 ==
Louisiana Highway 1139
- Location: Calcasieu Parish
- Length: 2.1 mi (3.4 km)
- Existed: 1955–c. 1957

Louisiana Highway 1139 (LA 1139) ran 2.1 miles (3.4 km) in a north–south direction from LA 27 west of Iowa to a local road northwest of Iowa. It was transferred to local control by 1958.

The entire route was in Calcasieu Parish.

| mi | km | Destinations | Notes |
|---|---|---|---|
| 0.0 | 0.0 | LA 27 – Iowa, Chloe | Southern terminus |
| 2.1 | 3.4 | End state maintenance | Northern terminus |
1.000 mi = 1.609 km; 1.000 km = 0.621 mi

== Louisiana Highway 1140 ==
Louisiana Highway 1140
- Location: Johnsons Bayou
- Length: 0.2 mi (320 m)
- Existed: 1955–c. 1957

Louisiana Highway 1140 (LA 1140) ran 0.2 miles (0.32 km) in a north–south direction from LA 82 to a local road in Johnsons Bayou. It was transferred to local control by 1958.

The entire highway was in Johnsons Bayou, Cameron Parish.

| mi | km | Destinations | Notes |
|---|---|---|---|
| 0.0 | 0.0 | LA 82 – Holly Beach, Cameron | Southern terminus |
| 0.2 | 0.32 | End state maintenance | Northern terminus |
1.000 mi = 1.609 km; 1.000 km = 0.621 mi

== Louisiana Highway 1141 ==
Louisiana Highway 1141
- Location: Cameron
- Length: 1.521 mi (2.448 km)
- Existed: 1955–present

Louisiana Highway 1141 (LA 1141) runs 1.49 miles (2.40 km) in a north–south direction from a dead end at the Calcasieu Ship Channel to a junction with the concurrent LA 27 and LA 82 in Cameron. It is currently proposed for deletion as part of La DOTD's Road Transfer program.

LA 1141 heads northeast across the largely abandoned Monkey Island for 1.5 miles (2.4 km) from the Calcasieu Ship Channel to an abandoned ferry landing on Calcasieu Pass. Across the pass, the roadway resumes and proceeds a short distance to a junction with LA 27/LA 82 (Marshall Street) in Cameron, the unincorporated seat of Cameron Parish. LA 1141 is an undivided two-lane highway for its entire length.

Once part of the main highway running along the Gulf of Mexico through Cameron Parish, this section of roadway was severed from the mainland in the mid-1940s when the Calcasieu Ship Channel was dug across its right-of-way. This bypassed a sharp bend in Calcasieu Pass and created what became known as Monkey Island. A second ferry crossing was necessary to carry automobile traffic through Cameron until the highway was re-aligned to the north of the island around 1954. The additional ferry remained in service on the original alignment, designated as LA 1141 in the 1955 Louisiana Highway renumbering, maintaining the connection between the island and LA 27/LA 82 on the mainland. By the mid-1990s, the Monkey Island Ferry had become a source of controversy, and state legislators complained about this expenditure of public funds which benefited only the seven families then living on the island. Discontinuation of the service had been threatened for several years when, in 2005, Hurricane Rita destroyed all structures on Monkey Island, displacing its residents and forcing the ferry's abandonment. As of 2017, LA 1141 remains in the state highway system though the roadway is heavily damaged and mostly inaccessible.

The entire highway is in Cameron, Cameron Parish.

| mi | km | Destinations | Notes |
|---|---|---|---|
| 0.000 | 0.000 | Dead end at Calcasieu Ship Channel | Southern terminus |
| 1.472 | 2.369 | Dead end at Calcasieu Pass | End state maintenance |
Gap in LA 1141; Monkey Island Ferry across Calcasieu Pass discontinued
| 1.472 | 2.369 | Dead end at Calcasieu Pass | Resume state maintenance |
| 1.521 | 2.448 | LA 27 / LA 82 (Marshall Street) | Northern terminus |
1.000 mi = 1.609 km; 1.000 km = 0.621 mi

== Louisiana Highway 1142 ==
Louisiana Highway 1142
- Location: Cameron
- Length: 0.843 mi (1,357 m)
- Existed: 1955–present

Louisiana Highway 1142 (LA 1142) runs 0.84 miles (1.35 km) in a north–south direction along Beach Road from the intersection of Gayle Street and Broussard Beach Road to the concurrent LA 27 and LA 82 in Cameron. It is currently proposed for deletion as part of La DOTD's Road Transfer program.

The entire highway is in Cameron, Cameron Parish.

| mi | km | Destinations | Notes |
|---|---|---|---|
| 0.000 | 0.000 | Begin state maintenance at intersection of Beach Road, Gayle Street (PR 3115), and Broussard Beach Road | Southern terminus |
| 0.843 | 1.357 | LA 27 / LA 82 (Marshall Street) | Northern terminus |
1.000 mi = 1.609 km; 1.000 km = 0.621 mi

== Louisiana Highway 1143 ==
Louisiana Highway 1143
- Location: Cameron Parish
- Length: 7.156 mi (11.516 km)
- Existed: 1955–present

Louisiana Highway 1143 (LA 1143) runs 7.16 miles (11.52 km) in an east–west direction from the junction of LA 27 and LA 82 at Creole to a local road east of Creole. It is currently proposed for deletion as part of La DOTD's Road Transfer program.

The entire highway is in Cameron Parish.

| Location | mi | km | Destinations | Notes |
|---|---|---|---|---|
| Creole | 0.000 | 0.000 | LA 27 south / LA 82 west (West Creole Highway) – Cameron LA 27 north / LA 82 east – Oak Grove, Lake Charles, Abbeville | Western terminus; to Cameron Prairie National Wildlife Refuge |
| | 7.156 | 11.516 | End state maintenance at intersection of LA 1143, PR 216, and PR 202 | Eastern terminus |
1.000 mi = 1.609 km; 1.000 km = 0.621 mi

== Louisiana Highway 1144 ==
Louisiana Highway 1144
- Location: Cameron Parish
- Length: 6.855 mi (11.032 km)
- Existed: 1955–present

Louisiana Highway 1144 (LA 1144) runs 6.86 miles (11.04 km) in a northwest to southeast direction along Big Pasture Road from LA 384 to a dead end southeast of Grand Lake. It is currently proposed for deletion as part of La DOTD's Road Transfer program.

The entire route is in Cameron Parish.

| mi | km | Destinations | Notes |
|---|---|---|---|
| 0.000 | 0.000 | LA 384 – Big Lake, Lake Charles | Northwestern terminus |
| 6.855 | 11.032 | Dead end at Number Three Canal | Southeastern terminus |
1.000 mi = 1.609 km; 1.000 km = 0.621 mi

== Louisiana Highway 1145 ==
Louisiana Highway 1145
- Location: West Baton Rouge Parish
- Length: 1.412 mi (2.272 km)
- Existed: 1955–present

Louisiana Highway 1145 (LA 1145) runs 1.41 miles (2.27 km) in a north–south direction from LA 76 west of Port Allen to the concurrent US 190 and LA 1 at Westover.

The route heads due north from LA 76 (Rosedale Road) along Calumet Road, traveling through rural farmland. After 0.3 miles (0.48 km), LA 1145 curves slightly northeast and maintains this heading for the remainder of its length. Immediately after crossing the Union Pacific Railroad (UP) line at grade, the highway reaches its northern terminus at US 190/LA 1 (Airline Highway), connecting with Baton Rouge to the east and Opelousas to the west. LA 1145 is an undivided two-lane highway for its entire length.

In the pre-1955 state highway system LA 1145 was designated as State Route C-1409. LA 1145 was created in the 1955 Louisiana Highway renumbering, and its route has remained the same to its present day. It is currently proposed for deletion as part of La DOTD's Road Transfer program.

The entire highway is in West Baton Rouge Parish.

| Location | mi | km | Destinations | Notes |
|---|---|---|---|---|
| | 0.000 | 0.000 | LA 76 (Rosedale Road) to I-10 – Port Allen, Rosedale | Southern terminus |
| Westover | 1.397– 1.412 | 2.248– 2.272 | US 190 / LA 1 (Airline Highway) – Baton Rouge, Opelousas | Northern terminus |
1.000 mi = 1.609 km; 1.000 km = 0.621 mi

== Louisiana Highway 1146 ==
Louisiana Highway 1146
- Location: Ikes–Rosepine
- Length: 7.826 mi (12.595 km)
- Existed: 1955–present

Louisiana Highway 1146 (LA 1146) runs 7.83 miles (12.60 km) in a southeast to northwest direction from LA 112 east of DeRidder to US 171 in Rosepine. It is currently proposed for deletion as part of La DOTD's Road Transfer program.

| Parish | Location | mi | km | Destinations | Notes |
|---|---|---|---|---|---|
| Beauregard | | 0.000 | 0.000 | LA 112 – DeRidder, Oakdale | Southern terminus |
| Vernon | Rosepine | 7.826 | 12.595 | US 171 (Johnnie B. Hall Memorial Highway) | Northern terminus |
1.000 mi = 1.609 km; 1.000 km = 0.621 mi

== Louisiana Highway 1147 ==
Louisiana Highway 1147
- Location: Beauregard Parish
- Length: 9.269 mi (14.917 km)
- Existed: 1955–present

Louisiana Highway 1147 (LA 1147) runs 9.27 miles (14.92 km) in a southeast to northwest direction from LA 113 at Bundick to LA 26 east of DeRidder. It is currently proposed for deletion as part of La DOTD's Road Transfer program.

The entire highway is in Beauregard Parish.

| Location | mi | km | Destinations | Notes |
|---|---|---|---|---|
| Bundick | 0.000 | 0.000 | LA 113 – Dry Creek, Wye | Southern terminus |
| | 9.269 | 14.917 | LA 26 – DeRidder, Oberlin | Northern terminus |
1.000 mi = 1.609 km; 1.000 km = 0.621 mi

== Louisiana Highway 1148 ==
Louisiana Highway 1148
- Location: Iberville Parish
- Length: 4.064 mi (6.540 km)
- Existed: 1955–present

Louisiana Highway 1148 (LA 1148) runs 4.06 miles (6.53 km) in an east–west direction from a local road southwest of Addis to LA 988 north of Plaquemine. The route's mileposts increase from the eastern end contrary to common practice. It is currently proposed for deletion as part of La DOTD's Road Transfer program. LA 1148 has a truck route that runs 0.70 miles (1.13 km) along Industrial Boulevard, a local road, on the western side of LA 1.

The entire route is in Iberville Parish.

| mi | km | Destinations | Notes |
|---|---|---|---|
| 4.064 | 6.540 | Begin state maintenance | Western terminus |
| 1.241 | 1.997 | LA 1148 Truck (Industrial Boulevard) | Western terminus of LA 1148 Truck |
| 0.978– 0.965 | 1.574– 1.553 | LA 1 north – Port Allen | Western end of LA 1 concurrency |
| 0.866– 0.854 | 1.394– 1.374 | LA 1 south – Plaquemine LA 1148 Truck (Industrial Boulevard) | Eastern end of LA 1 concurrency; eastern terminus of LA 1148 Truck |
| 0.000 | 0.000 | LA 988 (Warren Street) | Eastern terminus |
1.000 mi = 1.609 km; 1.000 km = 0.621 mi: Concurrency terminus

== Louisiana Highway 1149 ==
Louisiana Highway 1149
- Location: Indian Village–Kinder
- Length: 10.1 mi (16.3 km)
- Existed: 1955–1963

Louisiana Highway 1149 (LA 1149) ran 10.1 miles (16.3 km) in a southwest to northeast direction from a local road at the Jefferson Davis–Allen in Indian Village to US 165 in Kinder. It became part of LA 383 in 1963.

| Parish | Location | mi | km | Destinations | Notes |
|---|---|---|---|---|---|
| Jefferson Davis–Allen parish line | | 0.0 | 0.0 | Begin state maintenance | Southwestern terminus |
| Allen | Kinder | 10.1 | 16.3 | US 165 – Oberlin, Lake Charles | Northeastern terminus |
1.000 mi = 1.609 km; 1.000 km = 0.621 mi
