= Louisiana Highway 92 =

State highway in Louisiana, United States

Louisiana Highway 92

- Route of LA 92 highlighted in red

Route information
- Maintained by Louisiana DOTD
- Length: 40.720 mi (65.532 km)
- Existed: 1955 renumbering–present

Major junctions
- West end: US 90 east of Mermentau
- LA 91 in Morse; LA 13 south of Crowley; LA 35 west of Indian Bayou; US 167 in Maurice
- East end: LA 339 in Youngsville

Location
- Country: United States
- State: Louisiana
- Parishes: Acadia, Vermilion, Lafayette

Highway system
- Louisiana State Highway System; Interstate; US; State; Scenic
← LA 91	→ LA 93

Louisiana Highway 92 (LA 92) is a state highway located in southern Louisiana. It runs 40.72 miles (65.53 km) in an east–west direction from U.S. Highway 90 (US 90) east of Mermentau to LA 339 in Youngsville.

The route passes through several small villages and unincorporated communities, such as Morse, Indian Bayou, Maurice, and Milton. It traverses the rural area between the parallel US 90 and LA 14 corridors. Many of the highways intersecting LA 92, such as US 167 and LA 35, connect the two corridors and provide access to Interstate 10 (I-10) to the north. The eastern terminus of LA 92 is located just within the corporate limits of Youngsville, a suburban city south of Lafayette.

LA 92 was created in the 1955 Louisiana Highway renumbering from portions of several former state routes. Through most of its existence, the route continued through Youngsville and across US 90 to a junction with LA 31 just south of St. Martinville. This eastern segment became LA 92-1 in 2013 when much of the route within Youngsville was transferred to the city following a highway improvement project, which created a gap in state maintenance. In the future, more of LA 92, extending west from Youngsville to Maurice, is to be eliminated from the state highway system as part of the Louisiana Department of Transportation and Development's (La DOTD) Road Transfer Program.

== Route description ==
From the west, LA 92 begins at a junction with US 90 less than 0.5 miles (0.80 km) east of the village of Mermentau. It heads south along the winding Mermentau Cove Road for 3.4 miles (5.5 km) before turning due east. After making a zigzag onto a parallel section line road, LA 92 follows Whitney Street through the village of Morse, where it intersects LA 91 (Jackson Avenue). LA 92 continues east through rural Acadia Parish for another 11 miles (18 km), intersecting LA 1124 south of Estherwood and LA 13 south of Crowley. The highway then crosses Bayou Queue De Tortue into Vermilion Parish.

LA 92 passes through the northern portion of Vermilion Parish, where it makes several more right-angle turns. This stretch includes brief concurrencies with three other highways. The first is LA 35, connecting with Rayne to the north and Kaplan to the south. The second is with LA 700 and is located in an area known as Indian Bayou. Further east, LA 92 intersects LA 343 and follows West Lafayette Street into the village of Maurice. Here, the route makes another zigzag via US 167, connecting with Lafayette to the north and Abbeville to the south.

Heading east from Maurice, LA 92 crosses a vertical lift bridge over Bayou Vermilion and into the small Lafayette Parish community of Milton. The highway proceeds 2.9 miles (4.7 km) further to a roundabout junction with LA 339 (Verot School Road) at the western edge of Youngsville, a small suburban city. East Milton Avenue continues straight ahead into town as a local road.

=== Route classification and data ===
LA 92 is an undivided two-lane highway for its entire length, except the brief concurrency with US 167 in Maurice, where it is four lanes with a center turning lane. It is generally classified by the Louisiana Department of Transportation and Development (La DOTD) as a rural minor or major collector west of Maurice and as an urban minor arterial between Maurice and Youngsville. Daily traffic volume in 2013 ranged from 400 vehicles near Mermentau to 8,800 vehicles near Youngsville. The posted speed limit is generally 55 mph (90 km/h), reduced to 40 mph (65 km/h) in Maurice.

== History ==
In the original Louisiana Highway system in use between 1921 and 1955, the modern LA 92 was part of several routes, including State Route 1018 from Mermentau to Morse, State Route 294 from Indian Bayou to Maurice, and State Route 175 from Maurice to Youngsville. The remainder of the route between Morse and Indian Bayou consisted of local roads during this time.

LA 92 was designated in the 1955 renumbering, creating a continuous route through the communities midway between US 90 and LA 14. It also extended through the center of Youngsville and included the route of LA 92-1 as far as Cinco.

La 92—From a junction with La-US 90 at or near Mermentau through or near Morse, Maurice, Youngsville and Cade to a junction with La 31 at or near Cinco.

— 1955 legislative route description

For a time, LA 92 followed a more serpentine path through Acadia Parish east of Morse and passed through Lyons Point, located at a junction with LA 13. The route was straightened by utilizing parallel section line roads taken into the state highway system after the 1955 renumbering. The eastern terminus was extended slightly from LA 31 at Cinco when a swing bridge was constructed across Bayou Teche in 1984. In 2011, an arrangement was made to transfer the 4.2 miles (6.8 km) of LA 92 through Youngsville to the city following a highway improvement project that featured the construction of a new roundabout at the junction with LA 89. Several right-angle turns were also eliminated by extending Iberia Street eastward from the junction to connect directly with Young Street. The project, completed in 2013, created a discontinuity in state maintenance of LA 92, and the portion of the highway east of Youngsville was re-designated as LA 92-1.

== Future ==
La DOTD is currently engaged in a program that aims to transfer about 5,000 miles (8,000 km) of state-owned roadways to local governments over the next several years. Under this plan of "right-sizing" the state highway system, the portion of LA 92 between Maurice and Youngsville is proposed for deletion as it no longer meets a significant interurban travel function.

== Major intersections ==
Parish	Location	mi	km	Destinations	Notes
Acadia		0.000	0.000	US 90 – Jennings, Crowley	Western terminus; 0.3 miles (0.48 km) east of Mermentau
Acadia		3.361	5.409	LA 1119 (Vincent Road)	Northern terminus of LA 1119
Acadia	Morse	9.421	15.162	LA 91 (Jackson Avenue) – Midland, Gueydan	
Acadia		11.474	18.466	LA 1124 (South LeBlanc Road) – Estherwood	Southern terminus of LA 1124
Acadia		17.645	28.397	LA 13 – Crowley, Kaplan	
Vermilion		22.402	36.053	LA 699	Western terminus of LA 699
Vermilion		23.446	37.733	LA 35 south – Kaplan	West end of LA 35 concurrency
Vermilion		24.467	39.376	LA 705	Eastern terminus of LA 705
Vermilion		24.976	40.195	LA 35 north – Rayne	East end of LA 35 concurrency
Vermilion	Indian Bayou	26.478	42.612	LA 700 north – Rayne	West end of LA 700 concurrency
Vermilion		27.518	44.286	LA 700 south – Kaplan	East end of LA 700 concurrency
Vermilion		31.546	50.768	LA 343 – Abbeville, Duson	
Vermilion	Maurice	34.578	55.648	US 167 north (Maurice Avenue) – Lafayette	West end of US 167 concurrency
Vermilion	Maurice	34.998	56.324	US 167 south (Maurice Avenue) – Abbeville	East end of US 167 concurrency
Vermilion–Lafayette parish line	Milton	37.769– 37.833	60.783– 60.886	Bridge over Vermilion River	
Lafayette	Milton	39.067	62.872	LA 733 (East Broussard Road)	Eastern terminus of LA 733
Lafayette	Youngsville	40.691– 40.720	65.486– 65.532	LA 339 (Verot School Road) – Lafayette, Erath	Eastern terminus; roundabout; location also known as New Flanders
1.000 mi = 1.609 km; 1.000 km = 0.621 mi: Concurrency terminus

== Auxiliary route ==
Louisiana Highway 92-1
- Location: Youngsville–St. Martinville
- Length: 10.188 mi (16.396 km)
- Existed: 2013–present

Louisiana Highway 92-1 (LA 92-1) runs 10.19 miles (16.40 km) in an east–west direction from the junction of two local roads in Youngsville to LA 347 south of St. Martinville. It was part of LA 92 until a portion of the route in Youngsville was transferred to local control in 2013, creating a gap in state maintenance.

From the west, LA 92-1 begins at the junction of Young Street and Larrivere Road near the eastern edge of Youngsville in Lafayette Parish. The route heads due east to a junction with US 90 and turns south onto that highway, crossing into St. Martin Parish. After a short distance, LA 92-1 turns east again and follows Smede Highway as it zigzags to a junction with LA 182 (Old Spanish Trail Highway) at Cade. 4.3 miles (6.9 km) later, LA 92-1 crosses LA 31 just south of St. Martinville at a point known as Cinco. The route proceeds a short distance further across a swing bridge spanning Bayou Teche to a terminus at LA 347 (Cemetery Road) on the opposite bank.

LA 92-1 is an undivided two-lane highway for its entire length, with the exception of the US 90 concurrency, which is an undivided four-lane highway. It is generally classified as a rural major collector by the Louisiana Department of Transportation and Development (La DOTD). The average daily traffic volume in 2013 ranged between 2,500 and 3,600 vehicles over the entire route. The posted speed limit is 55 mph (90 km/h).

Prior to the 1955 Louisiana Highway renumbering, LA 92-1 was part of State Route 175 between Youngsville and Cade. The portion between Cade and Cinco was designated as State Route C-1491. The entire route was part of LA 92 from 1955 until 2013, when the portion of LA 92 through Youngsville was transferred to the city and eliminated from the state highway system, creating a gap in state maintenance. The transfer was part of a highway improvement project that straightened the route of LA 92 through town and converted the junction with LA 89 to a roundabout. Upon its completion, the eastern portion of LA 92 became LA 92-1. In the future, LA 92-1 is planned to be truncated on its west end to the junction with US 90 near the Lafayette–St. Martin parish line as part of La DOTD's Road Transfer Program.

Major intersections

Parish	Location	mi	km	Destinations	Notes
Lafayette	Youngsville	0.000	0.000	Young Street / Larrivere Road	Western terminus
Lafayette	Broussard	1.899– 1.916	3.056– 3.084	US 90 west – Lafayette	West end of US 90 concurrency
0.504-mile (0.811 km) concurrency with US 90 not counted in official route mileage
St. Martin	Broussard	1.916– 1.932	3.084– 3.109	US 90 east – New Iberia	East end of US 90 concurrency
St. Martin	Cade	5.006	8.056	LA 182 (Old Spanish Trail Highway) – New Iberia, Lafayette	
St. Martin	Cinco	9.283	14.940	LA 31 (Main Highway) – St. Martinville, New Iberia	
St. Martin		9.771– 9.840	15.725– 15.836	Bridge over Bayou Teche	
St. Martin		10.188	16.396	LA 347 (Cemetery Road) – Loreauville, Catahoula	Eastern terminus
1.000 mi = 1.609 km; 1.000 km = 0.621 mi
