= Louisiana Highway 102 =

Highway in Jefferson Davis Parish, Louisiana

Louisiana Highway 102

Route information
- Maintained by Louisiana DOTD
- Length: 35.4 mi (57.0 km)
- Existed: 1955 renumbering–present

Major junctions
- Northwest end: US 165 in Fenton
- LA 26 in Hathaway; US 90 / LA 97 in Jennings
- Southeast end: LA 26 north of Lake Arthur

Location
- Country: United States
- State: Louisiana
- Parishes: Jefferson Davis

Highway system
- Louisiana State Highway System; Interstate; US; State; Scenic
← LA 101	→ LA 103

Louisiana Highway 102 (LA 102) is a state highway located in Jefferson Davis Parish. It runs 35.4 miles (57.0 km) in a northwest to southeast direction from U.S. Highway 165 (U.S. 165) in Fenton to LA 26 north of Lake Arthur. The route is bannered west–east from Fenton to a point just east of the first junction with LA 26 at Hathaway. From this point to its terminus north of Lake Arthur, LA 102 travels in a north–south direction and is bannered accordingly. A largely rural route following section line roads, LA 102 passes through the city of Jennings in the southern portion of its route.

== Route description ==
From the northwest, LA 102 begins at an intersection with U.S. 165 in Fenton between Iowa and Kinder. It proceeds east along a section line road known as Fenton Highway and immediately crosses the Union Pacific Railroad tracks. It then continues east for two sections to Manuel Road, curves south for two sections to Estes Road, and curves back east for another two sections to an intersection with LA 99 at Radio Tower Road. From this intersection, LA 99 heads south to Welsh, and LA 102 turns north, running concurrent with LA 99 along Chaisson Road. After one section, the two highways intersect LA 3086 at the latter's southern terminus. LA 102 and LA 99 then turn east onto Pine Island Highway and continue for three sections to Pine Island. The concurrency ends here as LA 99 turns north toward Lauderdale and LA 102 continues eastward. After two sections, LA 102 intersects LA 395 (Liberty Cemetery Road) which heads south to Roanoke. LA 395 turns east and begins a short concurrency with LA 102 that lasts for two sections at which point LA 395 turns north at Raymond toward Elton. LA 102 continues east for another two sections and intersects LA 26 at a point known as Hathaway. LA 26 also runs to Elton on the north. After one more section, LA 102 turns to the south and parallels LA 26 to Jennings. Its bannering likewise changes from west–east to north–south.

Reaching the northern border of Jennings, LA 102 crosses over, but does not connect with, Interstate 10 (I-10). Just to the west, LA 26 engages in a full interchange with I-10 at Exit 64. Continuing south into town, LA 102 travels along North Cutting Avenue. At Roberts Avenue, LA 102 intersects LA 97, and the two highways run concurrent for a short distance to the intersection with U.S. 90 (East Shankland Avenue). Here, LA 97 reaches its southern terminus, and U.S. 90 continues west parallel with I-10 toward Lake Charles. LA 102 continues south in a final concurrency with U.S. 90. At East Division Street, the local name changes from North Cutting Avenue to South Cutting Avenue. Shortly thereafter, LA 102 and U.S. 90 intersect South Railroad Avenue at the BNSF/Union Pacific Railroad crossing. Here LA 3055 proceeds to the northwest and connects with LA 26 while U.S. 90 turns to the southeast toward Mermentau. LA 102 then continues south across the railroad tracks. After crossing the southern limit of Jennings, LA 102 intersects LA 1126. It continues south for four more sections then turns west onto Dugas Road and shortly ends at an intersection with LA 26 about 2.5 miles (4.0 km) north of Lake Arthur.

== History ==
In the original Louisiana Highway system in use between 1921 and 1955, the modern LA 102 made up parts of several routes, including State Route 105 from Fenton to the west end of the present LA 99 concurrency; State Route 735 to Raymond; State Route 2030 to Hathaway; State Route 702 to the change in direction east of Hathaway; State Routes 701 and 703 to a point just north of Jennings; and State Route 731 through Jennings to its southeastern terminus.

LA 102 was created with the 1955 Louisiana Highway renumbering, and its route has remained unchanged to the present day.

== Major intersections ==
The entire highway is in Jefferson Davis Parish.

Location	mi	km	Destinations	Notes
Fenton	0.0	0.0	US 165 – Lake Charles, Kinder	Northwestern terminus
	7.3	11.7	LA 99 south – Welsh	West end of LA 99 concurrency
	8.3	13.4	LA 3086 north	Southern terminus of LA 3086
Pine Island	11.4	18.3	LA 99 north (Lauderdale Highway) – Lauderdale	East end of LA 99 concurrency
	13.4	21.6	LA 395 south (Liberty Cemetery Road) – Roanoke	West end of LA 395 concurrency
Raymond	15.5	24.9	LA 395 north (Raymond Highway) – Elton	East end of LA 395 concurrency
Hathaway	17.6	28.3	LA 26 – Jennings, Elton	
Jennings	26.7	43.0	LA 97 north (Roberts Avenue) – Evangeline	North end of LA 97 concurrency
Jennings	26.8	43.1	US 90 west (East Shankland Avenue) – Welsh; LA 97	South end of LA 97 concurrency; north end of US 90 concurrency; southern terminus of LA 97
Jennings	27.8	44.7	US 90 east / LA 3055 (South Railroad Avenue) – Mermentau, Lake Arthur	South end of US 90 concurrency; eastern terminus of LA 3055
	30.0	48.3	LA 1126	
	35.4	57.0	LA 26 – Lake Arthur, Jennings	Southeastern terminus
1.000 mi = 1.609 km; 1.000 km = 0.621 mi: Concurrency terminus
