= Louisiana Highway 100 =

State highway in Louisiana, United States

Louisiana Highway 100

- Route of LA 100 highlighted in red

Route information
- Maintained by Louisiana DOTD
- Length: 14.831 mi (23.868 km)
- Existed: 1955 renumbering–present

Major junctions
- West end: LA 97 in Evangeline
- LA 91 east of Egan
- East end: LA 13 in Crowley

Location
- Country: United States
- State: Louisiana
- Parishes: Acadia

Highway system
- Louisiana State Highway System; Interstate; US; State; Scenic
← LA 99	→ LA 101
← SR 1044	1045	→ SR 1046

Louisiana Highway 100 (LA 100) is a state highway located in Acadia Parish, Louisiana. It runs 14.83 miles (23.87 km) in an east–west direction from LA 97 in Evangeline to LA 13 in Crowley.

The western section of the route connects the rural community of Evangeline with LA 91 at a point south of Iota. LA 91 and LA 100 then engage in a concurrency through the community of Egan, located near Interstate 10 (I-10) between Jennings and Crowley. East of Egan, LA 100 parallels the interstate to the northwest corner of Crowley, the parish seat. Here, the highway serves as an access road to the various services located around exit 80 on I-10. Though LA 100 has an overall east–west route, its signage does not carry directional banners.

== Route description ==
From the west, LA 100 begins at an intersection with LA 97 (Evangeline Highway) in an area known as Evangeline, northeast of Jennings. It proceeds eastward along Old Evangeline Highway and crosses Bayou Des Cannes and Bayou Pointe Aux Loups. Now known as Shelly Road, LA 100 continues east as the area transitions from pine forest to farmland. It then intersects LA 91 (Iota Highway) at a point 3.4 miles (5.5 km) south of Iota.

LA 100 turns south and begins a concurrency with LA 91. After 1.0 mile (1.6 km), the route curves southwest off of its section line road alignment onto Aspen Road. Reaching the small community of Egan, LA 91 and LA 100 turn east onto Egan Highway, running north of and parallel to I-10. The concurrency ends just north of exit 76 at Estherwood Highway, where LA 91 turns south toward Estherwood and LA 1120 heads to the north. Continuing east and closely following I-10, LA 100 intersects LA 3070 (McCain Road).

The highway then passes through a point known as Lawson, where it crosses the Acadiana Railway (AKDN) tracks and intersects LA 1121 (Oro Trail Road). After crossing a bridge over Bayou Plaquemine Brule, the highway briefly skirts the northern city limit of Crowley, the parish seat. LA 100 ends shortly afterward at an intersection with LA 13 adjacent to exit 80 on I-10. LA 13 connects Crowley with the city of Eunice to the north.

LA 100 is classified by the Louisiana Department of Transportation and Development (La DOTD) as a rural minor collector with the exception of the final 0.65 miles (1.05 km) in Crowley, which is classified as an urban collector. Average daily traffic volume in 2013 is reported as 1,780 vehicles between Evangeline and the junction with LA 91 and LA 1120 east of Egan. It then increases to 5,300 for the remainder of the route to Crowley. The posted speed limit is generally 55 mph (90 km/h) between points, decreased to 45 mph (70 km/h) through Evangeline and Crowley and 35 mph (55 km/h) through Egan. LA 100 is an undivided two-lane highway for its entire length.

== History ==
=== Pre-1955 route numbering ===
In the original Louisiana Highway system in use between 1921 and 1955, the modern LA 100 was part of two separate state highways, State Route 1045 and State Route 370.

State Route 1045
- Location: Acadia Parish
- Length: 5.3 mi (8.5 km)
- Existed: 1930–1955

State Route 1045 followed the current route of LA 100 from the western terminus to the first intersection with LA 91 north of Egan. It served as a connector between what was then State Route 370 and State Route 371. Route 1045 was created in 1930 by an act of the state legislature, and it remained the same up to the 1955 Louisiana Highway renumbering.

Route 1045. Connecting Rt. No. 370 to Rt. No. 371 at John Regan's corner to Evangeline Oil Field.

— 1930 legislative route description

State Route 370 followed the remainder of the modern LA 100 through Egan to Crowley. Like LA 100, Route 370 had a western section that ran east–west, but it was located 4.5 miles (7.2 km) to the north and passed through Iota rather than Evangeline. The route also remained unchanged up to the 1955 renumbering.

=== Post-1955 route history ===
LA 100 was created with the 1955 renumbering, following the entirety of former State Route 1045 and the portion of former State Route 370 running through Egan to Crowley.

La 100—From a junction with La 97 at or near Evangeline through or near Egan to a junction with La 13 at or near Lawson.

— 1955 legislative route description

With the exception of minor improvements, the route has remained the same to the present day. A small curve in the roadway at Sensat Cove Road (formerly LA 369) has been straightened. The eastern terminus at LA 13 was also slightly altered to accommodate the diamond interchange with I-10 constructed in 1963.

== Future ==
La DOTD is currently engaged in a program that aims to transfer about 5,000 miles (8,000 km) of state-owned roadways to local governments over the next several years. Under this plan of "right-sizing" the state highway system, the western and eastern ends of LA 100 are proposed for deletion as they do not meet a significant interurban travel function. Only the middle section of the route from the first junction with LA 91 to the junction with LA 3070 is to be retained.

== Major intersections ==
The entire highway is in Acadia Parish.

Location	mi	km	Destinations	Notes
Evangeline	0.000	0.000	LA 97 (Evangeline Highway) – Jennings, Basile	Western terminus
Egan	5.321	8.563	LA 91 north (Iota Highway) – Iota	West end of LA 91 concurrency
Estherwood	10.130	16.303	LA 91 south / LA 1120 north (Estherwood Highway) to I-10 – Estherwood, Iota	East end of LA 91 concurrency; southern terminus of LA 1120
	12.167	19.581	LA 3070 (McCain Road)	Southern terminus of LA 3070
Lawson	13.726	22.090	LA 1121 (Oro Trail Road)	Southern terminus of LA 1121
Crowley	14.822– 14.831	23.854– 23.868	LA 13 (Crowley–Eunice Highway) – Crowley, Eunice	Eastern terminus
1.000 mi = 1.609 km; 1.000 km = 0.621 mi: Concurrency terminus
