= Louisiana Highway 26 =

State highway in Louisiana, United States

Louisiana Highway 26

- Route of LA 26 highlighted in red

Route information
- Maintained by Louisiana DOTD
- Length: 75.861 mi (122.086 km)
- Existed: 1955 renumbering–present
- Tourist routes: Louisiana Scenic Byways: Flyway Byway; Myths & Legends Byway

Major junctions
- Northwest end: US 171 / US 190 southeast of DeRidder
- US 165 in Oberlin; US 190 east of Elton; I-10 in Jennings; US 90 in Jennings
- Southeast end: LA 14 in Lake Arthur

Location
- Country: United States
- State: Louisiana
- Parishes: Beauregard, Allen, Jefferson Davis

Highway system
- Louisiana State Highway System; Interstate; US; State; Scenic
← LA 25	→ LA 27

Louisiana Highway 26 (LA 26) is a state highway located in southwestern Louisiana. It runs 75.86 miles (122.08 km) in a northwest to southeast direction from a junction with the concurrent U.S. Highways 171 and 190 southeast of DeRidder to LA 14 in Lake Arthur.

The route initially follows an east–west path, connecting DeRidder with Oberlin. Just east of Oberlin, however, LA 26 turns due south for the remainder of its journey, and its directional banners change accordingly. During this portion of the route, LA 26 serves as the main north–south highway through Jennings, where it intersects both Interstate 10 (I-10) and the parallel US 90. Other notable junctions include US 165 in Oberlin and a second junction with US 190 in Elton. LA 26 traverses very sparsely populated territory outside the few towns it encounters.

LA 26 was designated in the 1955 Louisiana Highway renumbering, replacing the entirety of former State Route 52. It also took over the western leg of State Route 25, a long U-shaped route that was further split among the modern LA 14 and LA 31. Portions of the route had also carried US 190 briefly from 1935 to 1939.

== Route description ==
=== DeRidder to Oberlin ===
From the northwest, LA 26 begins at a junction with the concurrent US 171/US 190 approximately two miles (3.2 km) southeast of the DeRidder city limits. The route heads eastward as an undivided two-lane highway through rural Beauregard Parish. After eight miles (13 km), it intersects LA 1147, which provides access to several recreational facilities on nearby Bundick Lake. LA 26 then curves to the southeast and crosses LA 113, which connects to the small communities of Sugartown and Dry Creek. Shortly afterward, the highway crosses from Beauregard Parish into Allen Parish.

Just across the parish line, LA 26 intersects LA 377, which heads north toward the town of Elizabeth. In an area known as Mittie, LA 26 crosses the Whiskey Chitto (or Ouisca Chitto) Creek. The next several miles remain very sparsely populated until the highway crosses the Calcasieu River just outside the town of Oberlin. Here, the route curves due east onto 7th Avenue through a residential neighborhood. It then zigzags south onto North 5th Street and east again into the business district on 6th Avenue, a divided two-lane thoroughfare with continuous parking bays.

=== Oberlin to Jennings ===
After three blocks, LA 26 reaches the town's main junction at US 165, connecting with Kinder and Oakdale. The roadway narrows again as the highway immediately crosses the Union Pacific Railroad (UP) tracks at grade. After passing through another residential section for a few blocks, LA 26 curves southeast out of town then due east again to follow a section line road. four miles (6.4 km) later, the highway curves due south and will keep this trajectory for the remainder of its journey, its directional banners changing accordingly from east–west to north–south. 1.5 miles (2.4 km) along the way, LA 26 intersects LA 104, which heads east toward Mamou in neighboring Evangeline Parish.

About seven miles (11 km) later, LA 26 enters Jefferson Davis Parish and almost immediately crosses US 190 just east of Elton. Like US 165, this portion of US 190 closely follows the UP rail line, which necessitates another grade crossing. nine miles (14 km) south of US 190, LA 26 intersects LA 102 (Pine Island Highway) at Hathaway, then continues for another 7 miles (11 km) to the city of Jennings. At the northern city limits, LA 26 widens to a divided four-lane highway as it passes through a diamond interchange with I-10 at exit 64, connecting with Lake Charles to the west and Lafayette to the east. The roadway narrows slightly as the median disappears, and LA 26 continues south on Elton Road, serving as a corridor for newer commercial development.

=== Jennings to Lake Arthur ===
At Shankland Avenue, LA 26 crosses US 90, the de facto business route of I-10 through the region. The local name changes to Lake Arthur Avenue, and LA 26 proceeds through a residential neighborhood, passing a few blocks west of the city's traditional downtown area. Just after crossing the BNSF/UP tracks, LA 26 intersects LA 3055 (West Division Street), a short connector to eastbound US 90, and the highway narrows again to two lanes. Just south of the city limits, LA 26 zigzags to align itself with another section line road and has a brief concurrency with LA 1126, a minor rural route. four miles (6.4 km) later, it intersects the southern terminus of LA 102, having run parallel to that highway since Hathaway.

LA 26 proceeds a short distance further and gains a center turning lane just prior to entering the small town of Lake Arthur, which is situated on a body of water by the same name. An intersection with LA 380 (8th Street) facilitates a connection to westbound LA 14. One block after merging onto Calcasieu Avenue, LA 26 ends at a junction with LA 14 at 3rd Street. From this junction, LA 14 heads west on 3rd Street into the downtown area and also straight ahead on Calcasieu Avenue towards a bridge spanning the Mermentau River.

=== Route classification and data ===
LA 26 is classified by the Louisiana Department of Transportation and Development (La DOTD) as an urban principal arterial through Jennings and as a rural minor arterial otherwise. Daily traffic volume in 2013 peaked at 18,800 vehicles in Jennings and generally averaged less than 6,000 vehicles through the remainder of the route. A low count of 1,480 was reported east of Oberlin. The posted speed limit is 55 mph (90 km/h) for most of the route but is reduced as low as 25 or 35 mph (40 or 55 km/h) through town.

Two portions of LA 26 are included in the state-designated system of tourist routes known as the Louisiana Scenic Byways. The southeastern section from Lake Arthur to Jennings is part of the Flyway Byway, while the northwestern section from Oberlin to DeRidder is part of the Myths & Legends Byway.

== History ==
=== Pre-1955 route numbering ===
In the original Louisiana Highway system in use prior to 1955, LA 26 was part of two different routes. The east–west section from DeRidder to Oberlin made up the entirety of State Route 52. The north–south section from Oberlin to Lake Arthur was part of State Route 25, a long U-shaped route that continued east along the present LA 14 to New Iberia then north along LA 31 to Opelousas. Both Routes 25 and 52 were included in the first 98 state highway routes designated by the Louisiana Legislature in 1921 as part of an act which also created the Louisiana Highway Commission, an early forerunner of the Louisiana Department of Transportation and Development (La DOTD). Additionally, the stretch between DeRidder and Elton served briefly as part of US 190 when that highway was extended westward from Baton Rouge in 1935. However, the roadway was still gravel west of Oberlin and dirt from Oberlin to Elton. In the late 1930s, US 190 was shifted twice to take advantage of paved roadways in the area. It was ultimately routed via US 171 from DeRidder south to Ragley and what was then State Route 7 through Kinder, eliminating the longest stretch of the unpaved roadway on US 190 within the state.

=== Post-1955 route history ===
The modern LA 26 was created in 1955 when the Louisiana Department of Highways, the successor to the Highway Commission, renumbered the entire state highway system.

Class "A": La 26—From a junction with La-US 171 at or near DeRidder through or near Oberlin and Elton to a junction with La-US 90 at or near Jennings.
Class "B": La 26—From a junction with La-US 90 at or near Jennings to a junction with La 14 at or near Lake Arthur.

— 1955 legislative route description

With the 1955 renumbering, the state highway department initially categorized all routes into three classes: "A" (primary), "B" (secondary), and "C" (farm-to-market). This system has since been updated and replaced by a more specific functional classification system.

At the time of the renumbering, a project was underway to improve the last remaining unpaved stretches of the roadway, mostly in Allen Parish. A gravel section between LA 113 and Mittie was paved in 1955, as was a longer section of gravel roadway from LA 104 east of Oberlin to Elton the following year. The final unpaved section, a roadway alternating between dirt and gravel between the Oberlin line and LA 104, was paved around 1959. LA 26 has experienced no alignment changes during its existence, these improvements all having been carried out on the existing roadbed.

Additionally, the construction of I-10 parallel to US 90 through Jennings led to a diamond interchange being built to connect with LA 26. This interchange was partially opened in March 1963 with the completion of I-10 from Jennings east to Crowley. It was completely opened to traffic in the spring of 1965 when I-10 was completed west from Jennings to Welsh.

== Major intersections ==
Parish	Location	mi	km	Destinations	Notes
Beauregard		0.000– 0.038	0.000– 0.061	US 171 / US 190 – DeRidder, Lake Charles	Northwestern terminus
Beauregard		7.958	12.807	LA 1147 east – Bundick Lake	Western terminus of LA 1147
Beauregard		14.187	22.832	LA 113 – Sugartown, Dry Creek	
Allen		18.775	30.215	LA 377 north – Grant, Elizabeth	Southern terminus of LA 377
Allen		29.383– 29.583	47.287– 47.609	Bridge over Calcasieu River	
Allen	Oberlin	32.778	52.751	LA 1151 south (South 5th Street)	Northern terminus of LA 1151
Allen	Oberlin	33.075	53.229	US 165 – Kinder, Oakdale	
Allen		40.144	64.606	LA 104 east – Mamou	Western terminus of LA 104
Jefferson Davis		47.586	76.582	LA 1130 west	Eastern terminus of LA 1130
Jefferson Davis		47.629	76.651	US 190 – Elton, Basile	
Jefferson Davis	Hathaway	56.649– 56.702	91.168– 91.253	LA 102 (Pine Island Highway) – Panchoville, Pine Island	
Jefferson Davis	Jennings	64.052– 64.254	103.082– 103.407	I-10 – Lake Charles, Lafayette	Exit 64 on I-10
Jefferson Davis	Jennings	65.191	104.915	US 90 (Shankland Avenue) – Roanoke	
Jefferson Davis	Jennings	65.943	106.125	LA 3055 east (West Division Street)	Western terminus of LA 3055
Jefferson Davis		68.387	110.058	LA 1126 east	North end of LA 1126 concurrency
Jefferson Davis		68.691	110.547	LA 1126 west	South end of LA 1126 concurrency
Jefferson Davis		72.784	117.134	LA 102 north	Southeastern terminus of LA 102
Jefferson Davis	Lake Arthur	75.160	120.958	LA 380 west (8th Street) to LA 14 west	Eastern terminus of LA 380
Jefferson Davis	Lake Arthur	75.861	122.086	LA 14 (3rd Street, Calcasieu Avenue) – Downtown, Abbeville	Southeastern terminus
1.000 mi = 1.609 km; 1.000 km = 0.621 mi: Concurrency terminus
