= Louisiana Highway 35 =

State highway in Louisiana, United States

Louisiana Highway 35

Route information
- Maintained by Louisiana DOTD
- Length: 52.152 mi (83.931 km)
- Existed: 1955 renumbering–present

Major junctions
- South end: LA 82 in Forked Island
- I-10 in Rayne
- North end: US 190 in Lawtell

Location
- Country: United States
- State: Louisiana
- Parishes: Vermilion, Lafayette, Acadia, St. Landry

Highway system
- Louisiana State Highway System; Interstate; US; State; Scenic
← LA 34	→ LA 36

Louisiana Highway 35 (LA 35) is a 52.3 miles (84.2 km)-long north–south state highway in Louisiana that serves Vermilion, Lafayette, Acadia, and Saint Landry parishes, extending from Louisiana Highway 82, intersecting with exit 87 of Interstate 10, ending at US Route 190.

== Route description ==
From the south, LA 35 begins at a junction with LA 82 located just north of the Gulf Intracoastal Waterway and an area known as Forked Island. The route heads northward and crosses LA 14 in the city of Kaplan. North of Kaplan, LA 35 briefly overlaps LA 92 to the west of Indian Bayou. About 7 miles (11 km) later, LA 35 passes through the city of Rayne, where it runs concurrent with US 90 through the center of town. After US 90 departs to the east, LA 35 passes through a diamond interchange with I-10 (exit 87) at the north end of town. This interchange is followed immediately by a junction with LA 98. Continuing northward, LA 35 passes through the rural community of Branch en route to the town of Church Point. The route zigzags through the center of town, overlapping the route of LA 95. North of Church Point, LA 35 meanders into St. Landry Parish and reaches its northern terminus at US 190 in Lawtell.

== History ==
Prior to the 1955 Louisiana Highway renumbering, LA 35 was a road from Amite to Bogalusa via Franklinton. In 1955 the Amite-to-Franklinton segment became part of LA 16, and the Franklinton-to-Bogalusa segment became part of LA 10.

== Major intersections ==
Parish	Location	mi	km	Destinations	Notes
Vermilion		0.000	0.000	LA 82 – Esther, Pecan Island	Southern terminus; 1.0 mile (1.6 km) north of Forked Island
Vermilion		8.215	13.221	LA 335 – Perry, Abbeville	
Vermilion		11.433	18.400	LA 708	Eastern terminus of LA 708
Vermilion	Kaplan	11.862	19.090	LA 14 (Veterans Memorial Drive) – Abbeville, Gueydan	
Vermilion	Kaplan	13.848	22.286	LA 696 east – Meaux	Western terminus of LA 696
Vermilion		14.832	23.870	LA 700 north – Indian Bayou	Southern terminus of LA 700
Vermilion		17.878	28.772	LA 699 – Crowley	
Vermilion		19.904	32.032	LA 92 west – Morse	South end of LA 92 concurrency
Vermilion		20.924	33.674	LA 705	Eastern terminus of LA 705
Vermilion		21.434	34.495	LA 92 east – Indian Bayou	North end of LA 92 concurrency
Lafayette	No major junctions				
Acadia		24.614	39.612	LA 342 east (Golden Grain Road) – Ridge	Western terminus of LA 342
Acadia	Rayne	28.549	45.945	US 90 west (West Branche Street) – Crowley	South end of US 90 concurrency
Acadia	Rayne	29.129	46.879	US 90 east (East Texas Avenue) – Duson; LA 3076 (American Legion Drive)	North end of US 90 concurrency; eastern terminus of LA 3076
Acadia	Rayne	29.620	47.669	LA 98 east (West Jeff Davis Avenue)	South end of LA 98 concurrency
Acadia	Rayne	30.265– 30.403	48.707– 48.929	I-10 – Lafayette, Lake Charles	Exit 87 on I-10
Acadia	Rayne	30.429	48.971	LA 98 west (Roberts Cove Road) – Roberts Cove, Maxie	North end of LA 98 concurrency
Acadia		36.326	58.461	LA 1102 east (J.E. Pelton Road)	Western terminus of LA 1102
Acadia	Branch	37.249	59.946	LA 365 (Branch Highway) – Higginbotham, Mowata	
Acadia		40.764	65.603	LA 370 west (Roxie Highway) – Richard	Eastern terminus of LA 370
Acadia	Church Point	42.239	67.977	LA 95 south (South Main Street) – Opelousas	South end of LA 95 concurrency
Acadia	Church Point	42.561	68.495	LA 95 north (North Main Street) – Eunice	North end of LA 95 concurrency
Acadia–St. Landry parish line		45.083	72.554	LA 751 (St. Margaret Road)	Southern terminus of LA 751
St. Landry		47.528	76.489	LA 358	
St. Landry		51.336	82.617	LA 752	Eastern terminus of LA 752
St. Landry	Lawtell	52.087– 52.152	83.826– 83.931	US 190 (Prejean Highway, Lawler Highway) – Opelousas, Eunice	Northern terminus; one-way pair
1.000 mi = 1.609 km; 1.000 km = 0.621 mi: Concurrency terminus
