= Louisiana Highway 97 =

State highway in Louisiana, United States

Louisiana Highway 97

- Route of LA 97 highlighted in red

Route information
- Maintained by Louisiana DOTD
- Length: 21.553 mi (34.686 km)
- Existed: 1955 renumbering–present

Major junctions
- South end: US 90 / LA 102 in Jennings
- I-10 in Jennings
- North end: US 190 at the Acadia-Evangline parish line east of Basile

Location
- Country: United States
- State: Louisiana
- Parishes: Jefferson Davis, Acadia

Highway system
- Louisiana State Highway System; Interstate; US; State; Scenic
| ← LA 96 | → LA 98 |
| ← SR 370 | SR 371 | → SR 372 |

Louisiana Highway 97 (LA 97) is a state highway located in southwestern Louisiana. It runs 21.55 miles (34.68 km) in a north–south direction from the junction of U.S. Highway 90 (US 90) and LA 102 in Jennings to U.S. Highway 190 (US 190) east of Basile.

The highway connects Jennings, the seat of Jefferson Davis Parish, to one of two interchanges with Interstate 10 (I-10) that serve the small city. Outside of Jennings, LA 97 travels through a sparsely populated area as it parallels Bayou Nezpique at a distance of roughly two miles (3.2 km). This portion of the route, located in neighboring Acadia Parish, is known as Evangeline Highway and connects the rural community of Evangeline to the US 190 corridor.

== Route description ==
From the south, LA 97 begins at an intersection with US 90 and LA 102 in the city of Jennings, the seat of Jefferson Davis Parish. From this T-intersection, US 90 heads west on Shankland Avenue toward Welsh and south on Cutting Avenue co-signed with LA 102 toward Mermentau. LA 97 heads north on Cutting Avenue, an undivided two-lane thoroughfare, running concurrent with LA 102 for a short distance. It then turns east onto Roberts Avenue, gaining a center turning lane. After a few blocks, LA 97 curves to the northeast and passes a large cemetery as the surroundings become more rural. Reaching the northeast corner of town, the center lane disappears as LA 97 passes through an interchange with I-10 at exit 65. In the process, LA 97 crosses over the interstate, which connects with Lake Charles to the west and Lafayette to the east. Immediately beyond the interchange, LA 97 crosses a bridge over Bayou Nezpique, a tributary of the nearby Mermentau River, into Acadia Parish.

Having crossed the parish line, LA 97 turns due north through an area known as Evangeline, where it intersects LA 100 (Old Evangeline Highway). LA 100 generally parallels I-10 to the nearby city of Crowley. After 4.7 miles (7.6 km), LA 97 reaches an intersection with LA 98, connecting with the small town of Iota to the east. LA 1123, a minor rural route, also heads west from this intersection then loops back to LA 97 about 3.0 miles (4.8 km) later. Continuing north through rural farmland, LA 97 departs from its straight section line alignment and curves through a point known as Redich. Here, an intersection with LA 368 connects with the parallel LA 91 north of Iota. After intersecting another minor state route, LA 3068 (Barwick Road), LA 97 snakes its way to the northwest for about 2.0 miles (3.2 km). It then straightens out once more and proceeds due north to its terminus at US 190 on the Evangeline Parish line just east of Basile.

=== Route classification and data ===
LA 97 is classified by the Louisiana Department of Transportation and Development (La DOTD) as an urban minor arterial within Jennings and as a rural major collector for the remainder of its route. Daily traffic volume in 2013 reported an average of 7,000 vehicles through Jennings, peaking at 11,400 near US 90. Outside of Jennings, the traffic volume steadily dropped off until it reached an average of 1,170 vehicles as the route approaches US 190.

The posted speed limit is generally 55 mph (90 km/h), reduced to 35 mph (55 km/h) through Jennings.

== History ==
=== Pre-1955 route numbering ===
State Route 371
- Location: Jennings–Basile
- Length: 22.5 mi (36.2 km)
- Existed: 1928–1955

In the original Louisiana Highway system in use between 1921 and 1955, the modern LA 97 was designated as State Route 371. It was added to the state highway system by an act of the state legislature in 1928.

Route 371. Jennings to Basile via Evangeline.

— 1928 legislative route description

The southern terminus of Route 371 was located three blocks west from that of the present LA 97. At the time, US 90 followed Main Street rather than the parallel Cutting Avenue. The route remained the same until the 1955 Louisiana Highway renumbering, although unnecessary concurrencies with the designations of State Route 222 and State Route 370 were eliminated at some point.

=== Post-1955 route history ===
LA 97 was created in 1955 as a straight renumbering of former State Route 371.

La 97—From a junction with La-US 90 at or near Jennings through or near Evangeline and Redich to a junction with La-US 190 at or near Basile.

— 1955 legislative route description

Although no major changes have been made to the route of LA 97 since its creation, there have been several improvements. Shortly following the 1955 renumbering, a series of right-angle turns were smoothed out, most notably between Redich and Basile in Acadia Parish. By the 1980s, the portion of Main Street in Jennings carrying US 90 was returned to local control. The highway was realigned to follow the parallel Cutting Avenue co-signed with LA 102, and the southern terminus of LA 97 was then moved three blocks east to its present location. The bridge across Bayou Nezpique at the Jefferson Davis–Acadia parish line was replaced around 1990. An additional improvement occurred when I-10 was constructed through the area in the early 1960s. The interstate was opened to traffic eastward from Jennings to Crowley in March 1963, partially opening the interchange with LA 97. The interchange was completed with the opening of the section from Jennings westward to Welsh two years later.

== Future ==
La DOTD is currently engaged in a program that aims to transfer about 5,000 miles (8,000 km) of state-owned roadways to local governments over the next several years. Under this plan of "right-sizing" the state highway system, the portion of LA 97 between US 90 and I-10 in Jennings is proposed for deletion as it does not meet a significant interurban travel function.

== Major intersections ==
| Parish | Location | mi | km | Destinations | Notes |
|---|---|---|---|---|---|
| Jefferson Davis | Jennings | 0.000 | 0.000 | US 90 west (East Shankland Avenue) – Welsh US 90 east / LA 102 south (North Cutting Avenue) – Mermentau | Southern terminus; south end of LA 102 concurrency |
| Jefferson Davis | Jennings | 0.157 | 0.253 | LA 102 north (North Cutting Avenue) – Panchoville | North end of LA 102 concurrency |
| Jefferson Davis | Jennings | 1.506– 2.026 | 2.424– 3.261 | I-10 – Lake Charles, Lafayette | Exit 65 on I-10 |
| Jefferson Davis–Acadia parish line | | 2.080– 2.229 | 3.347– 3.587 | Bridge over Bayou Nezpique | |
| Acadia | Evangeline | 5.939 | 9.558 | LA 100 east (Old Evangeline Highway) – Iota | Western terminus of LA 100 |
| Acadia | | 10.599 | 17.057 | LA 98 east / LA 1123 (Des Cannes Highway) – Iota | Western terminus of LA 98; southern terminus of LA 1123 |
| Acadia | | 13.677 | 22.011 | LA 1123 (Reed Road) | Northern terminus of LA 1123 |
| Acadia | Redich | 16.477 | 26.517 | LA 368 east (Redich Road) – Iota | Western terminus of LA 368 |
| Acadia | | 18.231 | 29.340 | LA 3068 (Barwick Road) | Southern terminus of LA 3068 |
| Acadia–Evangeline parish line | | 21.553 | 34.686 | US 190 (Basile–Eunice Highway) – Basile, Eunice | Northern terminus |
1.000 mi = 1.609 km; 1.000 km = 0.621 mi: Concurrency terminus
