= Louisiana Highway 99 =

State highway in Louisiana, United States

Louisiana Highway 99

- Route of LA 99 highlighted in red

Route information
- Maintained by Louisiana DOTD
- Length: 32.439 mi (52.206 km)
- Existed: 1955 renumbering–present
- Tourist routes: Louisiana Scenic Byway: Flyway Byway

Major junctions
- South end: LA 14 west of Lake Arthur
- US 90 in Welsh; I-10 in Welsh
- North end: US 190 east of Kinder

Location
- Country: United States
- State: Louisiana
- Parishes: Jefferson Davis, Allen

Highway system
- Louisiana State Highway System; Interstate; US; State; Scenic
← LA 98	→ LA 100
← SR 104	SR 105	→ SR 106
← SR 713	SR 714	→ SR 715

Louisiana Highway 99 (LA 99) is a state highway located in southwestern Louisiana. It runs 32.44 miles (52.21 km) in a north–south direction from LA 14 west of Lake Arthur to U.S. Highway 190 (US 190) east of Kinder.

The highway bisects the sparsely populated Jefferson Davis Parish as it zigzags along rural section line roads. Roughly halfway along its route, LA 99 passes through the town of Welsh and an interchange with Interstate 10 (I-10), the region's main east–west highway. It also intersects US 90, an older parallel corridor that now acts largely as a business route in the area.

== Route description ==
From the south, LA 99 begins at an intersection with LA 14 approximately 8.5 miles (13.7 km) west of the town of Lake Arthur. Signs direct motorists to the nearby Lacassine National Wildlife Refuge located to the south. LA 99 proceeds due north as an undivided two-lane highway in a rural area of southern Jefferson Davis Parish. After 2.0 miles (3.2 km), it intersects LA 380, which passes through the small community of Thornwell. After another 2.0 miles (3.2 km), the highway curves east briefly then back to the north amidst a small cluster of farm houses. LA 99 crosses a bridge over Bayou Chene then intersects LA 1126 a distance of 2.8 miles (4.5 km) later.

As the surroundings become more residential, the highway enters the town of Welsh and travels along Simmons Street. US 90 passes through town on Russell Avenue, its primary east–west thoroughfare, connecting with Jennings to the east and Lake Charles to the west. LA 99 turns west to run concurrently with US 90 for a brief distance before turning north again onto Adams Street. Now following the town's primary north–south thoroughfare, LA 99 passes a series of historic brick storefronts and crosses the BNSF/Union Pacific Railroad line at grade. Shortly after passing the local cemetery, the surroundings abruptly become rural again. LA 99 immediately passes through a spread diamond interchange with I-10 at exit 54, crossing over the interstate in the process. I-10 parallels the US 90 corridor, connecting with Lake Charles to the west and Lafayette to the east.

LA 99 continues due north and makes a quick shift west then north again at an intersection with a section line road. 4.0 miles (6.4 km) later, the route intersects LA 102, which connects to Fenton on nearby US 165. The two highways proceed north concurrently for 1.0 mile (1.6 km), at which point the road continues straight ahead as LA 3086. LA 99 and LA 102 turn due east into a lightly populated community known as Pine Island. LA 102 continues straight ahead toward Hathaway while LA 99 turns to resume its northward course. After 6.0 miles (9.7 km), the highway begins to skirt the Jefferson Davis–Allen parish line. LA 99 proceeds for another 3.0 miles (4.8 km) to a point known as Lauderdale. Here, it reaches its northern terminus at US 190 between Kinder and Elton.

=== Route classification and data ===
LA 99 is classified by the Louisiana Department of Transportation and Development (La DOTD) as a rural major collector from its southern terminus to Pine Island. Between Pine Island and Lauderdale, it is classified as a rural minor collector. Daily traffic volume in 2013 averaged between 1,430 and 1,680 vehicles over most of the route. However, lower figures of 410 and 830 vehicles were reported at the south and north ends of the route, respectively.

The posted speed limit is generally 55 mph (90 km/h), reduced to either 30 mph (50 km/h) or 35 mph (55 km/h) through Welsh.

The portion of LA 99 from the southern terminus through Welsh is part of the Flyway Byway in the state-designated system of tourist routes known as the Louisiana Scenic Byways.

== History ==
=== Pre-1955 route numbering ===
In the original Louisiana Highway system in use between 1921 and 1955, the modern LA 99 was part of three separate routes.

==== Southern section ====
State Route 105
- Location: Jefferson Davis Parish
- Length: 26.9 mi (43.3 km)
- Existed: 1926–1955

The section from the southern terminus west of Lake Arthur to the present intersection with LA 102 southeast of Fenton made up the majority of State Route 105. It was designated in 1926 by an act of the state legislature.

Route 105. Beginning at a point on State Highway Route No. 98 approximately two miles southwest of Thornwell in Jefferson Davis Parish, thence proceeding in a northerly direction through the town of Welsh, thence in the same general direction to its intersection with State Highway Route No. 24 near Fenton, Jefferson Davis Parish, along the gravel highway as presently located.

— 1926 legislative route description

North of Welsh, Route 105 turned west to follow the modern route of LA 102 to Fenton, located along US 165. The route description identifies the northern terminus as State Route 24, which was co-signed with US 165 throughout the pre-1955 era. The portion of Route 105 that is now followed by LA 99 has remained virtually the same apart from the route through Welsh. Just before crossing into the south end of town, the pre-1955 route made a brief jog eastward onto a parallel road. After about 0.5 miles (0.80 km), it made a second jog back onto the current alignment at Frey Road. The route then continued into Welsh, where it turned west onto Derouen Street then north onto Adams Street, continuing straight across US 90 onto the current alignment. This part of the route was smoothed out shortly after the 1955 Louisiana Highway renumbering.

==== Northern section ====
State Route 714
- Location: Jefferson Davis Parish
- Length: 9.2 mi (14.8 km)
- Existed: 1930–1955

From the point where former State Route 105 turned west toward Fenton, a section of State Route 735 continued the modern route of LA 99 north then east for 4.1 miles (6.6 km) to Pine Island. State Route 714 then covered the remainder of the present LA 99 north to Lauderdale. Route 714 was added to the state highway system by an act of the state legislature in 1930.

Route 714. Beginning at N. W. corner Sec 3, Twp 7 S. R. 4 W on Evangeline Highway, thence South on section lines to SW corner Sec 15 Twp 8 S. R. 4 W.

— 1930 legislative route description

The route description reflects the fact that prior to 1935, when US 190 was extended west of the Mississippi River over former State Route 7, its route was generally called the Evangeline Highway. Route 714 remained virtually the same up to the 1955 renumbering.

=== Post-1955 route history ===
LA 99 was created in 1955 as a collective renumbering of former State Route 714 and the majority of former State Route 105, with a small portion of State Route 735 to connect them.

La 99—From a junction with La 14 at or near Thornwell through or near Welsh and Pine Island to a junction with La-US 190 at or near Lauderdale.

— 1955 legislative route description

The route through Welsh was changed less than a year following the 1955 renumbering. LA 99 now proceeded due north from LA 1126 directly to US 90 via Simmons Street. This eliminated several right-angle turns along the route but also necessitated a brief jog onto US 90 in order to proceed north onto Adams Street. The route of LA 99 has otherwise remained the same to the present day. However, a major improvement occurred when I-10 was constructed through the area in the early 1960s. The interstate was opened to traffic westward from Welsh to US 165 in Iowa in December 1963, partially opening the interchange with LA 99. The interchange was completed with the opening of the section from Welsh eastward to Jennings the following spring.

== Major intersections ==
Parish	Location	mi	km	Destinations	Notes
Jefferson Davis		0.000	0.000	LA 14 – Lake Arthur, Lake Charles	Southern terminus; to Lacassine National Wildlife Refuge
Jefferson Davis		2.005	3.227	LA 380 east – Thornwell	Western terminus of LA 380
Jefferson Davis		8.633	13.893	LA 1126 east	Western terminus of LA 1126
Jefferson Davis	Welsh	11.751	18.911	US 90 east (East Russell Avenue) – Jennings	South end of US 90 concurrency
Jefferson Davis	Welsh	12.011	19.330	US 90 west (West Russell Avenue) – Lake Charles	North end of US 90 concurrency
Jefferson Davis	Welsh	12.835– 13.210	20.656– 21.259	I-10 – Lake Charles, Lafayette	Exit 54 on I-10
Jefferson Davis		19.233– 19.279	30.953– 31.027	LA 102 west – Fenton	South end of LA 102 concurrency
Jefferson Davis		20.291	32.655	LA 3086 north	Southern terminus of LA 3086
Jefferson Davis	Pine Island	23.349	37.577	LA 102 east (Pine Island Highway)	North end of LA 102 concurrency
Jefferson Davis–Allen parish line	Lauderdale	32.439	52.206	US 190 – Kinder, Eunice	Northern terminus
1.000 mi = 1.609 km; 1.000 km = 0.621 mi: Concurrency terminus
