= Louisiana Highway 98 =

State highway in Louisiana, United States

Louisiana Highway 98

- Route of LA 98 highlighted in red

Route information
- Maintained by Louisiana DOTD
- Length: 47.756 mi (76.856 km)
- Existed: 1955 renumbering–present

Major junctions
- West end: LA 97 / LA 1123 west of Iota
- LA 13 east of Maxie; LA 35 in Rayne; I-10 in Rayne; LA 93 north of Scott; I-49 / US 167 at Carencro–Lafayette line
- East end: LA 354 at the Lafayette–St. Martin parish line east of Carencro

Location
- Country: United States
- State: Louisiana
- Parishes: Acadia, Lafayette

Highway system
- Louisiana State Highway System; Interstate; US; State; Scenic
← LA 97	→ LA 99

Louisiana Highway 98 (LA 98) is a state highway located in southern Louisiana. It runs 47.76 miles (76.86 km) in an east–west direction from the junction of LA 97 and LA 1123 west of Iota to the Lafayette–St. Martin parish line east of Carencro.

The route traverses the rural area north of and parallel to Interstate 10 (I-10) and U.S. Highway 90 (US 90) between Jennings and Lafayette. It briefly dips southward into the city of Rayne and intersects I-10 by way of a concurrency with LA 35. Otherwise, LA 98 largely passes through small rural communities, such as Iota, Maxie, Roberts Cove, and Mire. Near the east end of its route, LA 98 cuts between the adjacent cities of Lafayette and Carencro.

LA 98 was designated in the 1955 Louisiana Highway renumbering from portions of ten former routes. It thus takes a segmented and serpentine path through much of Acadia Parish. In Lafayette Parish, however, the route was almost entirely relocated onto the straight alignment of Gloria Switch Road around 1990. Rather the terminating in the center of Carencro, the current route passes through an interchange with I-49/US 167 south of town and extends eastward to what was formerly LA 354. Most of LA 98 is planned to be eliminated from the state highway system as part of the Louisiana Department of Transportation and Development's (La DOTD) Road Transfer Program.

== Route description ==
=== Iota to Rayne ===
From the west, LA 98 begins at a junction with LA 97 (Evangeline Highway) and LA 1123 (Des Cannes Highway) west of Iota, a small town in Acadia Parish. The route heads due east as an undivided two-lane highway on Des Cannes Highway through rural farmland, broken briefly by a wooded area on either side of Bayou des Cannes. LA 98 follows West Kennedy Avenue into Iota and intersects LA 91. The two highways zigzag through town concurrently, south onto Frey Street, southeast onto Duson Avenue (the main street), and southwest onto 5th Street. About 0.5 miles (0.80 km) beyond the local high school, LA 98 turns due east onto St. Joseph Avenue and heads out of town.

LA 98 crosses the Acadiana Railway (AKDN) line at Maxie and zigzags briefly onto LA 13, connecting with Crowley to the south and Eunice to the north. For the next 11 miles (18 km), the highway takes a winding course southeastward through Roberts Cove and into the city of Rayne.

=== Rayne to Carencro ===
In Rayne, LA 98 intersects LA 35 just north of that highway's interchange with I-10 (exit 87), connecting with Lafayette to the east and Lake Charles to the west. LA 98 turns south and overlaps LA 35 through the diamond interchange, where the roadway is briefly widened to a divided four-lane capacity. Once the highway leaves the commercial corridor situated near the exit, the median is discontinued as LA 35 and LA 98 proceed south along what is locally known as The Boulevard. After about six blocks, LA 98 turns east onto Jeff Davis Avenue and returns to two-lane capacity while LA 35 continues ahead toward the downtown area situated along US 90.

Shortly after exiting the Rayne city limits, LA 98 turns north onto Grand Prairie Highway and crosses back over I-10 without intersecting it. After passing through Arceneaux, LA 98 resumes its eastward course at Castille and crosses LA 95 at Mire, north of Duson. The highway has a brief concurrency with LA 343 that ends at a T-intersection marking the boundary of three parishes: Acadia, Lafayette, and St. Landry.

LA 98 continues due east into Lafayette Parish and intersects LA 93 at a roundabout located north of Scott. The route follows Gloria Switch Road into the sprawling, rural city of Carencro, located adjacent to the larger city of Lafayette. LA 98 intersects LA 182 (North University Avenue) then begins to straddle the line between the two cities. Shortly after making two 90° turns, LA 98 passes through a diamond interchange with the concurrent I-49/US 167 at exit 2. The highway continues east for another 4.4 miles (7.1 km) until reaching its terminus at a T-intersection with Sawmill Highway, a local road.

=== Route classification and data ===
LA 98 has several functional classifications over the course of its route, as determined by the Louisiana Department of Transportation and Development (La DOTD). It is classified as an urban principal arterial in Carencro and an urban minor arterial in Rayne. Outside of these cities, the highway ranges from a rural major collector through the Iota area to a rural local road over the lightly traveled portions near Maxie and Mire. Daily traffic volume in 2013 peaked at 18,500 vehicles in Rayne and 7,000 through Carencro. The rural portions of the route generally averaged less than 3,000 vehicles daily with a low of 970 reported between Maxie and Roberts Cove. The posted speed limit is generally 55 mph (90 km/h) in rural areas, reduced to between 30 mph (50 km/h) and 45 mph (70 km/h) through town.

== History ==
In the original Louisiana Highway system in use between 1921 and 1955, LA 98 was part of a number of different routes including: State Route 370 from the western terminus to Iota, State Route 1044 to Maxie, State Route 368 to Roberts Cove, State Route 365 to Rayne, State Route 363 to Castille, State Route 1021 to Mire, State Route 117 just east of Mire, State Route 989 into Lafayette Parish, State Route 161 to Vatican, and State Route 178 to Carencro. These route segments were joined under the single designation of LA 98 when the Louisiana Department of Highways renumbered the state highway system in 1955.

La 98—From a junction with La 97 west of Iota through or near Iota, Maxie, Rayne and Castille to a junction with La-US 167 at or near Carencro.

— 1955 legislative route description

The two significant changes to the route since the 1955 renumbering have resulted from the nearby construction of interstate highways. In December 1966, I-10 was completed through the Rayne area with an interchange that disrupted the right-of-way of LA 98. The highway was re-routed to make a longer loop through town that included a concurrency with LA 35. Three years earlier, US 167 was moved from what is now LA 182 onto a new four-lane alignment through Carencro with partial access control. It included an interchange with Gloria Switch Road, a local road, located south of town. Between 1981 and 1983, the new alignment of US 167 was upgraded to interstate standards as part of I-49. Around 1990, LA 98 was moved from its original serpentine route that terminated in the center of Carencro. It was re-routed to follow Gloria Switch Road to the I-49/US 167 interchange, a more logical traffic pattern, and continue to the parish line at what was once LA 354 (Sawmill Highway, now a local road).

== Future ==
La DOTD is currently engaged in a program that aims to transfer about 5,000 miles (8,000 km) of state-owned roadways to local governments over the next several years. Under this plan of "right-sizing" the state highway system, most of LA 98 is proposed for deletion as it no longer meets a significant interurban travel function. The main exception is the portion of the route west of Maxie, which passes through the town of Iota. Two other short portions near Rayne and Mire are to be retained and will likely be incorporated into the routes of connecting highways. As of 2017, the portion in Rayne from LA 35 to Llama Road is under agreement to be removed from the state highway system and transferred to local control.

== Major intersections ==
Parish	Location	mi	km	Destinations	Notes
Acadia		0.000	0.000	LA 97 (Evangeline Highway) – Jennings, Basile LA 1123 north (Des Cannes Highway)	Western terminus of LA 98; southern terminus of LA 1123
Acadia	Iota	5.260	8.465	LA 91 north – Eunice, Basile	West end of LA 91 concurrency
Acadia	Iota	5.868	9.444	LA 370 east (Duson Avenue)	Western terminus of LA 370
Acadia	Iota	6.610	10.638	LA 91 south (South 5th Street) – Egan	East end of LA 91 concurrency
Acadia		7.935	12.770	LA 1120 (Gravot Road)	Northern terminus of LA 1120
Acadia		10.452	16.821	LA 3070 (McCain Road)	
Acadia	Maxie	12.823	20.637	LA 13 north (Crowley-Eunice Highway) – Eunice	West end of LA 13 concurrency
Acadia	Maxie	12.913	20.781	LA 13 south (Crowley-Eunice Highway) – Crowley	East end of LA 13 concurrency
Acadia		13.902	22.373	LA 1109 (Schule Road)	Southern terminus of LA 1109
Acadia		15.622	25.141	LA 1110 (Providence Highway)	Western terminus of LA 1110
Acadia		18.446	29.686	LA 1111 (Bayou Plaquemine Road) – Crowley	Northern terminus of LA 1111
Acadia	Roberts Cove	20.741	33.379	LA 1113 Spur (Wabash Road)	Western terminus of LA 1113 Spur
Acadia	Roberts Cove	21.131	34.007	LA 1113 (Candy Lane)	Southern terminus of LA 1113
Acadia		22.149	35.645	LA 367 (White Oak Highway) – Church Point	Southern terminus of LA 367
Acadia	Rayne	24.069– 24.080	38.735– 38.753	LA 35 north (Church Point Highway) – Church Point	West end of LA 35 concurrency
Acadia	Rayne	24.107– 24.239	38.796– 39.009	I-10 – Lafayette, Lake Charles	Exit 87 on I-10
Acadia	Rayne	24.890	40.057	LA 35 south (Clegg Street)	East end of LA 35 concurrency
Acadia	Arceneaux	30.259	48.697	LA 1097 (Heritage Road)	Western terminus of LA 1097
Acadia	Castille	31.339	50.435	LA 1101 north (Castille Highway)	Southern terminus of LA 1101
Acadia		32.070	51.612	LA 1100 (Higginbotham Highway)	Southern terminus of LA 1100
Acadia	Mire	33.113	53.290	LA 95 (Mire Highway) – Duson, Church Point	
Acadia		35.148	56.565	LA 365 (Osage Trail)	Eastern terminus of LA 365
Acadia		35.175	56.609	LA 343 south (Credeur Road)	West end of LA 343 concurrency
Acadia–Lafayette– St. Landry parish tripoint		36.181	58.228	LA 343 north (Bosco Highway)	East end of LA 343 concurrency
Lafayette		37.688	60.653	LA 93 – Scott, Cankton	Roundabout
Lafayette	Carencro	41.702	67.113	LA 182 (North University Avenue)	
Lafayette	Carencro–Lafayette line	43.237– 43.372	69.583– 69.800	I-49 / US 167 – Lafayette, Opelousas	Exit 2 on I-49/US 167
Lafayette	Carencro–Lafayette line	44.376	71.416	LA 176 (Moss Street)	Northern terminus of LA 176
Lafayette–St. Martin parish line		47.756	76.856	LA 354 (Sawmill Highway)	Eastern terminus
1.000 mi = 1.609 km; 1.000 km = 0.621 mi: Concurrency terminus
