= Branch, Louisiana =

- Census-designated place
- Location within the state of Louisiana
- Coordinates: 30°20′42″N 92°16′23″W
- Country: United States
- State: Louisiana
- Parish: Acadia

Area
  - Total: 7.38 sq mi (19.11 km^{2})
  - Land: 7.36 sq mi (19.05 km^{2})
  - Water: 0.023 sq mi (0.06 km^{2})
- Elevation: 39 ft (12 m)

Population (2020)
  - Total: 431
  - Density: 58.6/sq mi (22.62/km^{2})
- Time zone: UTC-6 (Central (CST))
  - Summer (DST): UTC-5 (CST)
- ZIP code: 70516
- FIPS code: 22-09235
- GNIS feature ID: 2586670

Branch is an unincorporated community and census-designated place in Acadia Parish, Louisiana, United States. As of the 2020 census, Branch had a population of 431.

Branch is located on LA-35 near the LA-365 intersection, approximately 5 miles (8 km) south of the town of Church Point and 8 miles (13 km) north of the city of Rayne.

== Demographics ==
Historical population
Census	Pop.	Note	%±
2010	388		—
2020	431		11.1%
U.S. Decennial Census

Branch first appeared as a census designated place in the 2010 U.S. census.
