= Forked Island, Louisiana =

Unincorporated community in Louisiana, U.S.

Coordinates: 29°49′53″N 92°18′00″W

Forked Island is an unincorporated community in Vermilion Parish, Louisiana, United States. The island was severely affected by Hurricane Rita in 2005.
