= Estherwood, Louisiana =

- Village
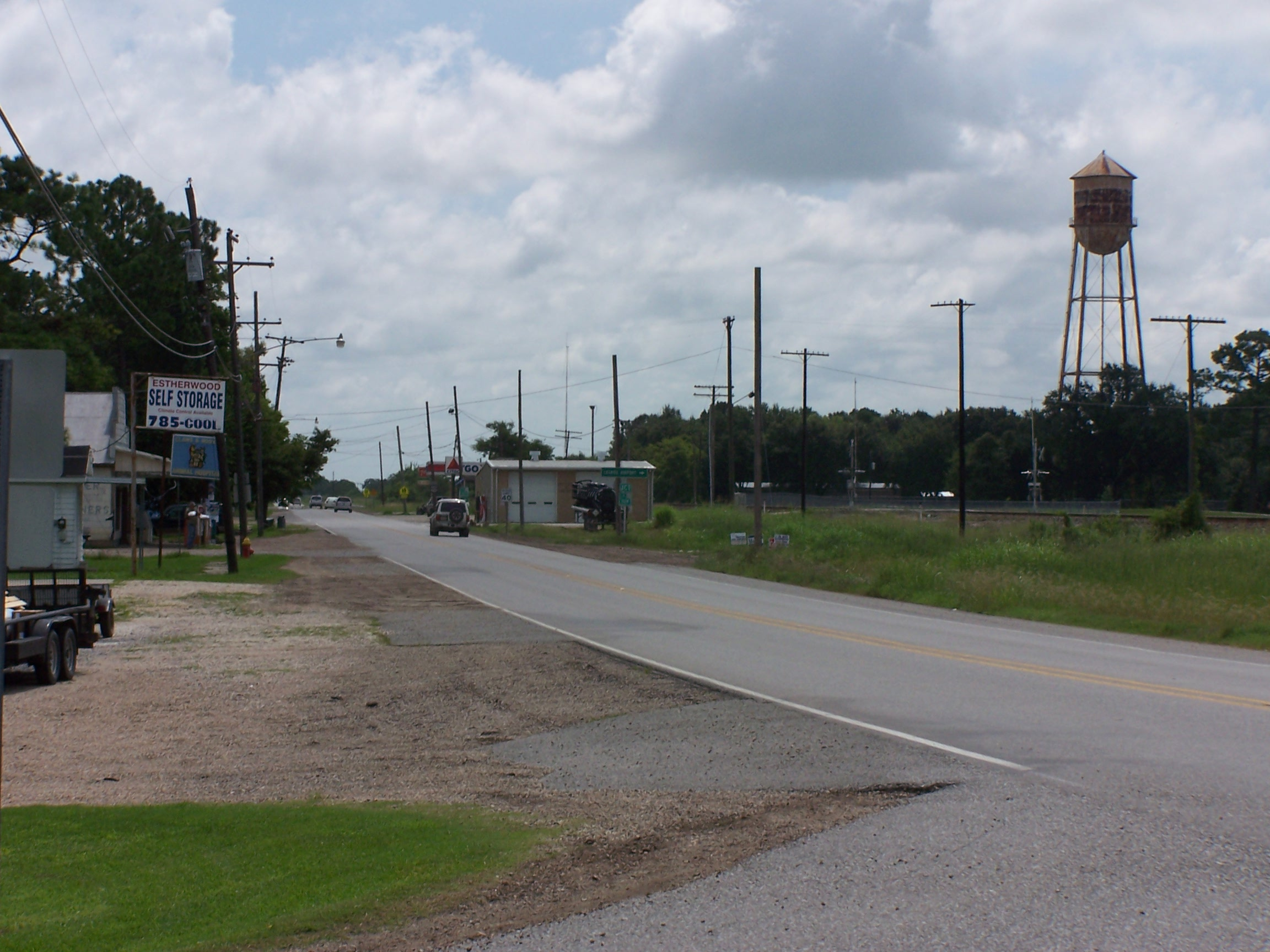
- Downtown Estherwood

- Location of Estherwood in Acadia Parish, Louisiana.

- Location of Louisiana in the United States
- Coordinates: 30°10′54″N 92°27′48″W
- Country: United States
- State: Louisiana
- Parish: Acadia

Area
  - Total: 1.86 sq mi (4.83 km^{2})
  - Land: 1.86 sq mi (4.83 km^{2})
  - Water: 0 sq mi (0.00 km^{2})
- Elevation: 16 ft (4.9 m)

Population (2020)
  - Total: 694
  - Density: 372.3/sq mi (143.76/km^{2})
- Time zone: UTC-6 (CST)
  - Summer (DST): UTC-5 (CDT)
- Area code: 337
- FIPS code: 22-24460
- GNIS feature ID: 2407451
- Website: villageofestherwood.org

Estherwood is a village in Acadia Parish, Louisiana, United States. As of the 2020 census, Estherwood had a population of 694. It is part of the Crowley Micropolitan Statistical Area.

== History ==
The Estherwood area had two earlier names, Tortue, after the Indian chief, and Coulée Trief or Trive. The Coulée Trief name involves Jean-Baptiste Trief, a mysterious person believed to have been one of Jean Lafitte's pirates, who built a cabin on the coulee, about 6 miles (10 km) west of Crowley, Louisiana, about 1816. He was described as a "tall, dark, sinister-looking" man who wore large earrings like pirates once did.

There are several stories about how Estherwood got its name. A likely one is that it is the combination of two names: Wood, for a Dr. Wood who was once prominent in the area, and Esther, for the wife of a railroad executive. Another is the wood part may come from the fact that the trains stopped for fuel wood here.

Jacob Kollitz and A. D. LeBlanc established stores near the Trief cabin in the early 1890s, and a little settlement began to grow around them. Kollitz also operated the 15-room Estherwood Hotel for a time, but it was closed in 1907.

The settlement began to grow just after the turn of the century with the Miller-Morris Canal, one of the first large rice irrigation systems, which helped establish the rice industry in the area, followed in 1900 by the opening of the Eureka rice mill at Estherwood.

By the spring of 1900, there were more than 30 residences in the town, new streets were being graded, and sidewalks were being put down. A chapel was finished there in 1910 and ministered as a mission of St. John the Evangelist Church in Mermentau. Estherwood was incorporated as a village on March 12, 1901, and Henry Feitel was elected its first mayor.

== Geography ==
According to the United States Census Bureau, the village has a total area of 1.9 square miles (4.8 km^{2}), all land.

== Demographics ==
Historical population
Census	Pop.	Note	%±
1910	544		—
1920	571		5.0%
1930	572		0.2%
1940	539		−5.8%
1950	547		1.5%
1960	639		16.8%
1970	661		3.4%
1980	691		4.5%
1990	745		7.8%
2000	807		8.3%
2010	889		10.2%
2020	694		−21.9%
2025 (est.)	675	▼	−2.7%
U.S. Decennial Census

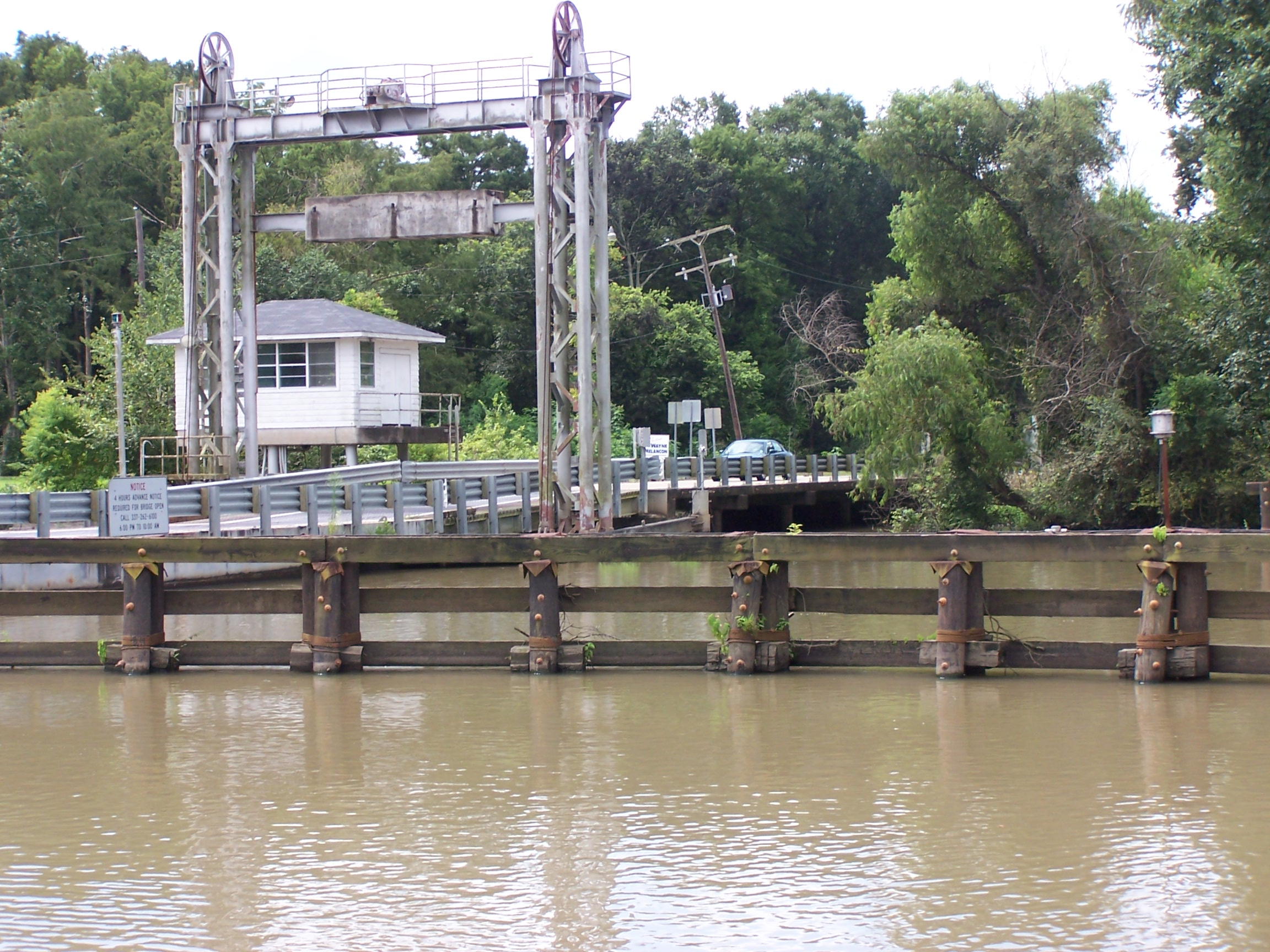
The pontoon bridge that leads into Estherwood

As of the census of 2000, there were 807 people, 291 households, and 215 families residing in the village. The population density was 432.1 inhabitants per square mile (166.8/km^{2}). There were 314 housing units at an average density of 168.1 per square mile (64.9/km^{2}). The racial makeup of the village was 93.06% White, 4.71% African American, 0.74% Native American, 0.12% Asian, and 1.36% from two or more races. Hispanic or Latino of any race were 0.25% of the population.

There were 291 households, out of which 38.5% had children under the age of 18 living with them, 60.1% were married couples living together, 11.0% had a female householder with no husband present, and 25.8% were non-families. 22.7% of all households were made up of individuals, and 11.0% had someone living alone who was 65 years of age or older. The average household size was 2.77 and the average family size was 3.28.

In the village, the population was spread out, with 29.5% under the age of 18, 11.5% from 18 to 24, 27.4% from 25 to 44, 21.1% from 45 to 64, and 10.5% who were 65 years of age or older. The median age was 32 years. For every 100 females, there were 94.5 males. For every 100 females age 18 and over, there were 92.9 males.

The median income for a household in the village was $29,444, and the median income for a family was $33,125. Males had a median income of $24,821 versus $16,250 for females. The per capita income for the village was $12,211. About 13.6% of families and 15.0% of the population were below the poverty line, including 8.8% of those under age 18 and 44.0% of those age 65 or over.
