= Lyons Point, Louisiana =

Lyons Point
- Unincorporated community
- Location of Lyons Point in Louisiana
- Coordinates: 30°05′41″N 92°22′41″W
- Country: United States
- State: Louisiana
- Parish: Acadia
- Elevation: 16 ft (4.9 m)
- Time zone: UTC-6 (CST)
  - Summer (DST): UTC-5 (CDT)
- Area code: 337

Lyons Point is a small unincorporated community in Acadia Parish, Louisiana, United States, located at the intersection of LA 1115 and Benton Road. The community is part of the Crowley Micropolitan Statistical Area.
