= Evangeline, Louisiana =

- Unincorporated community
- Location within Louisiana Location within the United States
- Coordinates: 30°15′45″N 92°34′14″W
- Country: United States
- State: Louisiana
- Parish: Acadia
- Elevation: 30 ft (9.1 m)
- Time zone: UTC-6 (Central (CST))
  - Summer (DST): UTC-5 (CDT)
- ZIP code: 70537
- Area code: 337
- GNIS feature ID: 543191

Evangeline is an unincorporated community in Acadia Parish, Louisiana, United States. The community is located at the junction of Louisiana Highways 97 and 100, 5.9 miles (9.5 km) east-northeast of Jennings. Evangeline has a post office with ZIP code 70537.
