= Roanoke, Louisiana =

- Unincorporated community
- Location within Louisiana Location within the United States
- Coordinates: 30°14′13″N 92°44′50″W
- Country: United States
- State: Louisiana
- Parish: Jefferson Davis

Area
  - Total: 0.43 sq mi (1.11 km^{2})
  - Land: 0.43 sq mi (1.11 km^{2})
  - Water: 0 sq mi (0.00 km^{2})
- Elevation: 26 ft (7.9 m)

Population (2020)
  - Total: 491
  - Density: 1,148.5/sq mi (443.42/km^{2})
- Time zone: UTC-6 (Central (CST))
  - Summer (DST): UTC-5 (CDT)
- Area code: 337
- GNIS feature ID: 555810

Roanoke is an unincorporated community and census-designated place in Jefferson Davis Parish, Louisiana, United States. As of the 2020 census, Roanoke had a population of 491.

The Roanoke post office was established in 1895.

== Geography ==
According to the U.S. Census Bureau, the community has an area of 0.428 square miles (1.11 km^{2}), all land.

== Demographics ==
Historical population
| Census | Pop. | Note | %± |
|---|---|---|---|
| 2010 | 546 | | — |
| 2020 | 491 | | −10.1% |
U.S. Decennial Census

Roanoke was first listed as a census designated place in the 2010 U.S. census.
