= Egan, Louisiana =

- Census-designated place
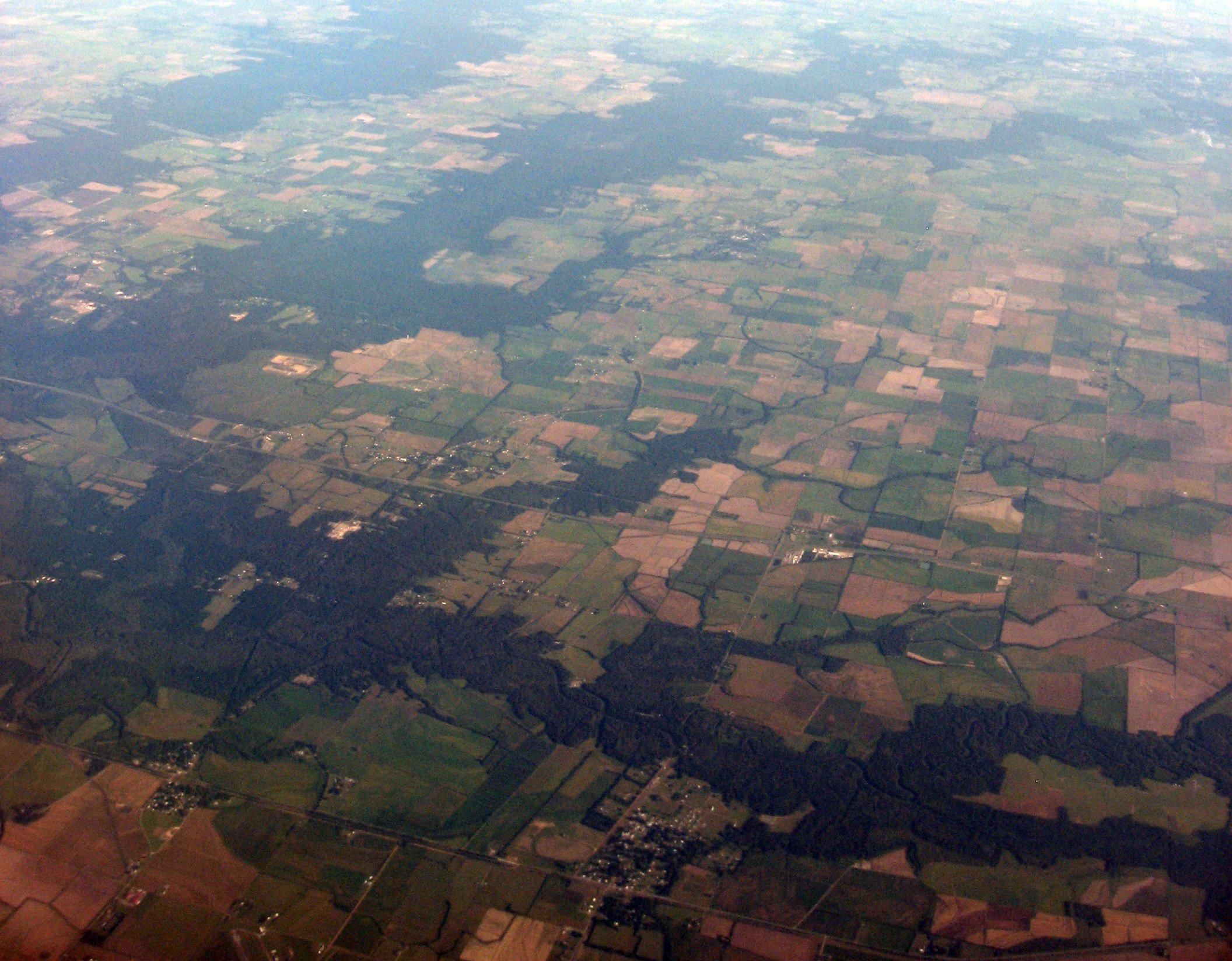
- 2009 aerial photo of Egan

- Location of Egan in Louisiana
- Coordinates: 30°14′40″N 92°30′28″W
- Country: United States
- State: Louisiana
- Parish: Acadia

Area
  - Total: 4.86 sq mi (12.59 km^{2})
  - Land: 4.85 sq mi (12.56 km^{2})
  - Water: 0.012 sq mi (0.03 km^{2})
- Elevation: 23 ft (7.0 m)

Population (2020)
  - Total: 618
  - Density: 127.5/sq mi (49.21/km^{2})
- Time zone: UTC-6 (CST)
  - Summer (DST): UTC-5 (CDT)
- ZIP Code: 70531
- Area code: 337
- FIPS code: 22-23025
- GNIS feature ID: 2586676

Egan is an unincorporated community and census-designated place in Acadia Parish, Louisiana, United States, located between Crowley and Jennings along Louisiana Highway 100, approximately two and one-half miles north of Midland near Bayou Jonas. The community is a part of the Crowley Micropolitan Statistical Area. As of the 2020 census, Egan had a population of 618.

The community was named for William M. Egan, a businessman of Crowley, Louisiana.

== History ==
The town of Egan was first known as Jonas Cove. After the postmaster of the time, it became known as Regan for a short while. In 1899, the settlement acquired the name Canal Switch when canal workers for W. W. Duson built a warehouse for the convenience of rice farmers in the area. The Southern Pacific Railroad operated a switch there to handle shipping, hence the name. The final name change was in honor of William M. Egan, the president of the company that built the rice mill at Egan and developed the town.

In the early 1870s, roadbed for the Louisiana Western railroad was constructed from Lafayette to Egan. It later decided to re-route the railroad south of the Egan area to eliminate bridging across Bayous Plaquemine Brûlée and des Cannes. The roadbed, constructed by convict labor, remained and the dirt left from it was used to build Acadia Parish roads. Interstate 10 was constructed on, or nearly on, the old roadbed.

In the spring of 1903, John W. Smith & Frank Scanlan purchased 600 acres from W. W. Duson for $30,000, comprising nearly all of the lots in the town. Smith & Scanlan owned a general merchandise store in Egan, known simply as the Smith & Scanlan store, which handled general merchandise, farm equipment, grain, & feed. The store burned down in February 1904, and was not rebuilt. The Smith & Scanlan store was not the first store of Egan, however; in 1901, A. Rose and Son operated a general store there. Other businessmen of Egan were G. E., Joe, E. D., & Frank Truax, brothers from Michigan who operated a sawmill some time before 1900. By 1902, the Truax Brothers general store was in operation, and it included a dance hall and a saloon. Later, the business was separated into two stores, operated by G. E. and E. D. Truax. In 1909, the E. D. Truax store also housed the post office. Other businesses in operation prior to World War I were the J. J. Regan store and warehouse; J. N. and Dominique Leger's warehouse and feed company; the Egan branch of Farmer's Mercantile, operated by Armas Bourgeois, F. A. Roy, & Aurelien Hebert.

The first church at Egan was constructed by the United Brethren in Christ Church in the summer of 1906. Catholics of Egan attended Mass at the Iota church six miles north of the community.

Early settlers of the Egan area were families of Regan, Trumps, Sensat, Leger, and Clements.

== Demographics ==
Historical population
Census	Pop.	Note	%±
2010	631		—
2020	618		−2.1%
U.S. Decennial Census

Egan first appeared as a census designated place in the 2010 U.S. census.
