= Roberts Cove, Louisiana =

Roberts Cove
- Unincorporated community
- Location of Roberts Cove in Louisiana
- Coordinates: 30°16′28.8″N 92°18′6.48″W
- Country: United States
- State: Louisiana
- Parish: Acadia

Area
  - Total: 3.5 sq mi (9.1 km^{2})
  - Land: 3.5 sq mi (9.1 km^{2})
  - Water: 0.0 sq mi (0 km^{2})
- Elevation: 36 ft (11 m)
- Time zone: UTC-6 (CST)
  - Summer (DST): UTC-5 (CDT)
- Area code: 337

Roberts Cove (formerly German Cove; French: Anse-Robert) is an unincorporated community in Louisiana, United States.

Roberts Cove is not a town, but rather a scattered rural community with the St. Leo's Catholic church complex as a community and cultural center which is located three miles northwest of Rayne in Acadia Parish. It is part of the Crowley Micropolitan Statistical Area.

== History ==
In 1867, Rev. Peter Leonard Thevis, a native priest of Langbroich, Nordrhein-Westfalen, Germany, was asked to come to New Orleans by Archbishop Jean-Marie Odin, mainly because of the large number of German immigrants there.

It was on January 13, 1880, that Fr. Thevis, accompanied by his brother Peter Joseph Thevis, his nephew, John Gerhard Thevis and Herman Grein, came on this railway to Rayne, and to the prairie land three miles north of Rayne to look over the area. The site selected for the future colony was known as "Roberts Cove" named for Benjamin Roberts, the original owner of a Spanish land grant.

Thereafter, thirteen families joined them in 1881. These German Catholics were fleeing the Gangelt, Geilenkirchen district of Germany to avoid religious persecution and military impressments.

Fr. Hennemann purchased land that included a house which served as both rectory and chapel and another building which served as a school house in the spring of 1883. The Benedictines helped to established the parish of St. Leo IV in 1885.

Roberts Cove was staunchly German until the World War I era when harsh anti-German wartime legislation initiated a decline of the German language and other cultural elements. The Louisiana state legislature passed Act 114 which made all expressions of German culture and heritage, especially the printed or spoken use of the German language, illegal in the state. Consequently, there are few remaining German speakers and relatively few overt manifestations of German culture yet the community is still viewed as a German ethnic enclave.

== Culture ==
Roberts Cove is known for its annual Germanfest in October. The event is held the first weekend in October at St. Leo's Catholic Church. Visitors are treated to local German food, heritage and genealogy. German singing and German Folk dancing performed by descendants from 8 to 80 years old are special attractions. The Roberts Cove German Heritage Museum is open for visitors.

== See also ==
- German American
