= Morse, Louisiana =

- Village
- Location of Morse in Acadia Parish, Louisiana.

- Location of Louisiana in the United States
- Coordinates: 30°07′20″N 92°29′54″W
- Country: United States
- State: Louisiana
- Parish: Acadia
- Incorporated: 1906

Area
  - Total: 1.40 sq mi (3.63 km^{2})
  - Land: 1.40 sq mi (3.63 km^{2})
  - Water: 0 sq mi (0.00 km^{2})
- Elevation: 10 ft (3.0 m)

Population (2020)
  - Total: 599
  - Density: 428/sq mi (165.1/km^{2})
- Time zone: UTC-6 (CST)
  - Summer (DST): UTC-5 (CDT)
- Area code: 337
- FIPS code: 22-52320
- GNIS feature ID: 2407507

Morse is a village in Acadia Parish, Louisiana, United States. As of the 2020 census, Morse had a population of 599. It is part of the Crowley Micropolitan Statistical Area.

Laid out in 1898 on land owned by J. M. Crabtree, Morse was settled by farmers from Illinois and Iowa and incorporated as a village in 1906. The Southern Pacific Railroad had built a line here in 1895 connecting Midland and Gueydan and named it Morse Station after the railroad's New Orleans–based passenger agent, Col. Samuel Finley Breese Morse, a cousin of the inventor of the telegraph. Morse had promoted immigration efforts targeting the area.

== Geography ==
According to the United States Census Bureau, the village has a total area of 1.4 square miles (3.6 km^{2}), all land.

== Demographics ==
Historical population
Census	Pop.	Note	%±
1910	237		—
1920	482		103.4%
1930	549		13.9%
1940	742		35.2%
1950	679		−8.5%
1960	682		0.4%
1970	759		11.3%
1980	835		10.0%
1990	782		−6.3%
2000	759		−2.9%
2010	812		7.0%
2020	599		−26.2%
2025 (est.)	618	▲	3.2%
U.S. Decennial Census

As of the census of 2000, there were 759 people, 279 households, and 201 families residing in the village. The population density was 541.9 inhabitants per square mile (209.2/km^{2}). There were 313 housing units at an average density of 223.5 units per square mile (86.3 units/km^{2}). The racial makeup of the village was 98.29% White, 1.05% African American, 0.26% from other races, and 0.40% from two or more races. Hispanic or Latino of any race were 0.40% of the population.

There were 279 households, out of which 40.5% had children under the age of 18 living with them, 51.6% were married couples living together, 12.5% had a female householder with no husband present, and 27.6% were non-families. 23.7% of all households were made up of individuals, and 9.7% had someone living alone who was 65 years of age or older. The average household size was 2.72 and the average family size was 3.18.

In the village, the population was spread out, with 31.8% under the age of 18, 9.2% from 18 to 24, 29.1% from 25 to 44, 20.2% from 45 to 64, and 9.7% who were 65 years of age or older. The median age was 32 years. For every 100 females, there were 101.9 males. For every 100 females age 18 and over, there were 106.4 males.

The median income for a household in the village was $24,922, and the median income for a family was $28,750. Males had a median income of $27,083 versus $16,875 for females. The per capita income for the village was $12,346. About 20.8% of families and 22.9% of the population were below the poverty line, including 23.6% of those under age 18 and 18.6% of those age 65 or over.
