= Hathaway, Louisiana =

Coordinates: 30°20′59″N 92°40′18″W

Hathaway is a rural farming community about 10 miles (16 km) north of Jennings, Louisiana in Jefferson Davis Parish, with a population of approximately 1,500. There is one school with approximately 800 students that is Pre-K through 12th grade.
