= Mermentau, Louisiana =

- Village

- Location of Louisiana in the United States
- Coordinates: 30°11′15″N 92°35′02″W
- Country: United States
- State: Louisiana
- Parish: Acadia

Area
  - Total: 2.30 sq mi (5.96 km^{2})
  - Land: 2.13 sq mi (5.52 km^{2})
  - Water: 0.17 sq mi (0.44 km^{2})
- Elevation: 13 ft (4.0 m)

Population (2020)
  - Total: 516
  - Density: 242.1/sq mi (93.47/km^{2})
- Time zone: UTC-6 (CST)
  - Summer (DST): UTC-5 (CDT)
- Area code: 337
- FIPS code: 22-49870
- GNIS feature ID: 2407501

Mermentau is a village in Acadia Parish, Louisiana, United States. As of the 2020 census, Mermentau had a population of 516. It is part of the Crowley Micropolitan Statistical Area.

== History ==
In the last quarter of the 18th century, there was an Atakapa chief named Nementou. On April 16, 1784, he sold land on Bayou Plaquemine Brule to Antoin Blanc for $100. Nementou is later mentioned as chief of a village on a river with the same name. Eventually, through a clerical error, Nementou became Mementou and this was then corrupted into Mermentau through confusion with the French word mer, which means "sea".

The Mermentau area was once reputedly a refuge for smugglers. It was a crossing point for brave travelers on the Old Spanish Trail, but had such a bad reputation that until the Louisiana Purchase no one would go there to see how many people there were.

John Landreth was a surveyor who was sent from Washington, D.C., in 1818 to look for timber in Acadiana that could be harvested for the use of building Navy ships. He kept a journal and had this to say: "...these places, particularly the Mermentau and Calcasieu are the harbours and Dens of the most abandoned wretches of the human race... smugglers and Pirates who go about the coast of the Gulph (sic) of vessels of a small draught of water and rob and plunder without distinction every vessel of every nation they meet and are able to conquer and put to death every soul they find on board without respect of persons age or sex and then their unlawful plunder they carry all through the country and sell at a very low rate and find plenty of purchasers."

=== Early settlement ===
During the Civil War and the years immediately after it there were widespread reports of bushwhackers, robbers, and other fugitives hiding in the Mermentau woods and tales of hidden treasures in the area. According to one of the stories, a man named Frank Quebedeaux once found an iron pot filled with coins. The cache had been hidden between four copal trees that had grown close together.

One of the earliest known settlers was John Webb, an English seaman who came in 1827. It is said that Webb was a member of the crew of Lord Nelson's flagship at the famous Battle of Trafalgar (Oct. l, 1805) in which the British defeated French and Spanish fleets but during which Nelson was killed. Webb lived in an area that came to be known as Webb's Cove, near the junction of the Mermentau River and Bayou Queue de Tortue. Cornelius Duson McNaughton, who was running from the law in Quebec, joined Webb there about 1837.

Jean Castex, a native of France, came to Mermentau around 1856. He opened a mercantile business in 1859 and later became one of Acadia Parish's leading merchants. He was also a cotton and rice farmer and built what may have been the first cotton gin in the parish in 1860. A sawmill was also built at the town about that time. The Mermentau post office was established on September 2, 1859.

Victorin Maignaud, another native of France, came to Mermentau in 1866 and opened a dry goods store. Maignaud operated the river ferry for some 40 years, was postmaster for 17 years, and eventually owned a store, hotel, sawmill, and rice mill.

Timber from the Mermentau area provided much of the building material and fencing used by the prairie settlers. The lumber was hauled by oxcart to places as far away as Opelousas.

On May 18, 1872, the Opelousas Courier reported: "For the last two weeks the streets of our town have been almost daily crowded with carts and wagons loaded with pieux, boards, and shingles coming from Pointe-aux-Loups and Mermento (sic). Never has there been such a crowd at one time, and so successively we counted eleven ox-wagons in one expedition in one day this week. Eight feet pieux are worth $12 per 100; six feet pieux, $6, and shingles, $6 per 1,000."

Jesuit priests from Grand Coteau began to visit Mermentau in the 1860s. In 1871, Father Joseph Anthonioz had begun to gather lumber to build a chapel there, but it was never finished. The first church was built in 1882, next to the Maignaud Cemetery on what is now Hwy. 90. It burned down in 1886.

In 1891, a temporary chapel was built at another location. Property for the church in its present location was donated in 1889 by Jean Castex and Mrs. Marie U. Duhon, widow of Aurelien Duhon. A larger church was built there, but in August 1900 it was blown off its foundation by a storm and damaged beyond use. It was finally rebuilt in 1908.

=== Later years ===
The Louisiana Western Railroad reached Mermentau in 1880. In February of that year only 4 miles (6 km) of roadbed remained to be graded between Lafayette and Mermentau. Some 150 convicts were at work on the stretch near Bayou Blanc. By the end of July the road was completed from Mermentau westward to the Texas line.

By the end of August 1880, the railroad line from New Orleans to Houston was open for freight business. Passenger trains with sleepers attached were running a regular schedule from New Orleans to Houston by the end of September.

The trains, however, did not solve all transportation problems in the area. Produce, lumber, and cattle had to be transported to the rail line. Capt. George W. Caldwell began carrying freight on the Mermentau about 1890, eventually owning a fleet of small boats and 24 barges. The barges hauled rice, oil, cattle, cotton, wood, and general freight. Capt Caldwell also operated a commissary on the river front and issued metal tokens in denominations of 5,10, 25 and 50 cents and $1. These became known as "Mermentau Money".

During the 1890s, the 96-ton Olive operated as a popular passenger and freight hauler on the Mermentau River, making round trips every other day from Mermentau to Lake Arthur. People from Crowley and elsewhere would take the train to Mermentau, then board the Olive for a weekend trip to Lake Arthur. The boat was described as "a splendid sternwheel packet". The Louisiana Press Association members and their wives, meeting in Crowley in 1894, were entertained on one such excursion. Fares were 50 cents one-way or 75 cents for a round-trip ticket.

Mermentau achieved legal village status on November 11, 1899.

=== Today ===
Mermentau is known for where Captain James Campbell, pirate Jean Laffite's most trusted lieutenant, stashed $9,000 in gold coins.

== Geography ==
According to the United States Census Bureau, the village has a total area of 2.3 square miles (6.0 km^{2}), of which 2.1 square miles (5.5 km^{2}) is land and 0.15 square miles (0.4 km^{2}) (7.39%) is water.

Situated along the Mermentau River, Mermentau supplies freshwater for the Mermentau Basin. The basin contains about 450,000 acres (1,820 km^{2}) of wetlands, consisting of 190,000 acres (770 km^{2}) of fresh marsh, 135,000 acres (546 km^{2}) of intermediate marsh, and 101,000 acres (409 km^{2}) of brackish marsh. A total of 104,380 acres (422 km^{2}) of marsh has converted to open water since 1932, a loss of 19 percent of the historical wetlands in the basin.

== Demographics ==
Historical population
Census	Pop.	Note	%±
1910	323		—
1920	364		12.7%
1930	394		8.2%
1940	571		44.9%
1950	636		11.4%
1960	334		−47.5%
1970	716		114.4%
1980	771		7.7%
1990	760		−1.4%
2000	721		−5.1%
2010	661		−8.3%
2020	516		−21.9%
2025 (est.)	490	▼	−5.0%
U.S. Decennial Census

As of the census of 2000, there were 721 people, 277 households, and 204 families residing in the village. The population density was 337.9 inhabitants per square mile (130.5/km^{2}). There were 344 housing units at an average density of 161.2 per square mile (62.2/km^{2}). The racial makeup of the village was 85.99% White, 12.48% African American, 0.42% Native American, 0.42% from other races, and 0.69% from two or more races. Hispanic or Latino of any race were 2.08% of the population.

There were 277 households, out of which 34.3% had children under the age of 18 living with them, 50.5% were married couples living together, 16.2% had a female householder with no husband present, and 26.0% were non-families. 21.7% of all households were made up of individuals, and 11.2% had someone living alone who was 65 years of age or older. The average household size was 2.60 and the average family size was 3.02.

In the village, the population was spread out, with 28.8% under the age of 18, 7.6% from 18 to 24, 27.7% from 25 to 44, 24.0% from 45 to 64, and 11.8% who were 65 years of age or older. The median age was 35 years. For every 100 females, there were 93.3 males. For every 100 females age 18 and over, there were 95.1 males.

The median income for a household in the village was $26,786, and the median income for a family was $31,250. Males had a median income of $32,917 versus $13,977 for females. The per capita income for the village was $11,408. About 25.0% of families and 26.4% of the population were below the poverty line, including 31.3% of those under age 18 and 39.3% of those age 65 or over.

== Education ==
Acadia Parish School Board serves Mermentau.
