= Section line road =

In many jurisdictions in the United States, roads run along every section line, giving access to previously remote areas and serving in many instances as firebreaks. A road or arterial in which the centerline is laid out along a section line boundary is often referred to as a section line road or section line arterial. In Lubbock, Texas, Oklahoma City; Boise, Idaho; metropolitan areas of Arizona (most notably Phoenix and Tucson); and much of the Las Vegas Valley, all major thoroughfares run along section lines, producing a readily identifiable grid.

In some locales, section lines were designated as the basis for the street numbering system. For example, in the state of North Dakota the Burkle addressing system is used to name the section line roads and other rural roads across the state for consistency in emergency services. The state of South Dakota uses a similar system, but it numbers starting from the northwest corner of the state, rather than from the geographical center as in the Burkle system.

== See also ==
- Section (United States land surveying)
