= Acadia Parish, Louisiana =

Parish in Louisiana, United States

Acadia Parish
- Parish
- Parish of Acadia; Paroisse de l'Acadie (French)
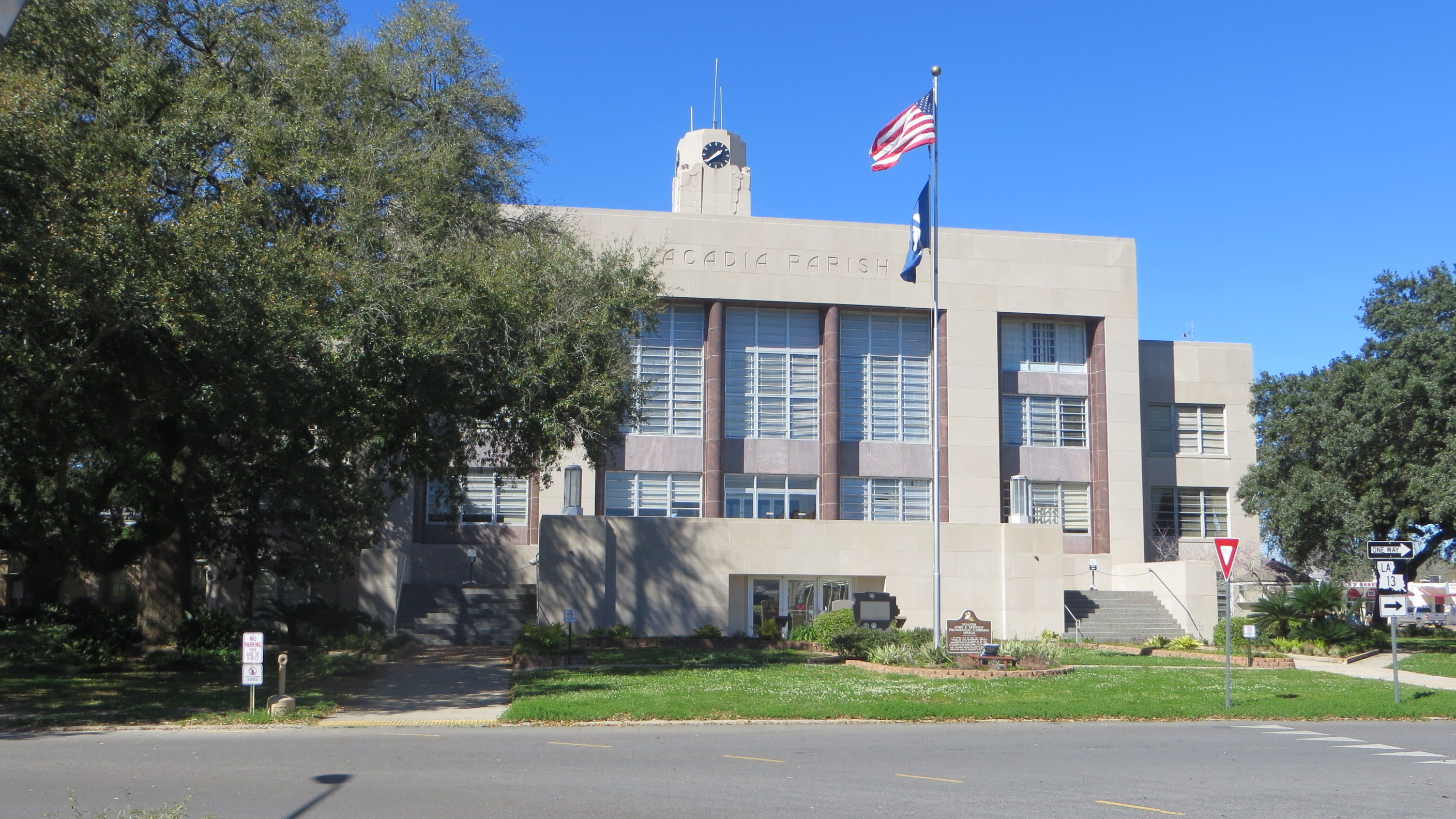
- Acadia Parish Courthouse

- Seal

- Location within the U.S. state of Louisiana
- Coordinates: 30°16′N 92°24′W
- Country: United States
- State: Louisiana
- Founded: June 30, 1886
- Named for: The Acadians
- Seat: Crowley
- Largest city: Crowley

Area
  - Total: 657 sq mi (1,700 km^{2})
  - Land: 655 sq mi (1,700 km^{2})
  - Water: 2.3 sq mi (6.0 km^{2}) 0.4%

Population (2020)
  - Total: 57,576
  - Estimate (2025): 57,032 ▼
  - Density: 87.9/sq mi (33.9/km^{2})
- Time zone: UTC−6 (Central)
  - Summer (DST): UTC−5 (CDT)
- Congressional district: 3rd
- Website: appj.org

Acadia Parish (French: Paroisse de l'Acadie) is a parish located in the U.S. state of Louisiana. At the 2020 U.S. census, the population was 57,576. The parish seat and the most populous municipality is Crowley. The parish was founded from parts of St. Landry Parish in 1886, and later an election was held to determine the parish seat, ending when Crowley beat Rayne and Prairie Hayes. Acadia Parish is included in the Lafayette metropolitan statistical area.

== History ==
The name of the parish is derived from the former French colony of Acadia in Canada (which consisted of the modern provinces of Nova Scotia, Prince Edward Island, New Brunswick, and much of Maine). After Britain defeated France in the Seven Years' War, they took control of their North American colonies east of the Mississippi River. They required ethnic French Acadians to take a loyalty oath and never got over their suspicions of them. They deported many of the French-speaking inhabitants to France. From there, some joined others who had migrated directly to the French colony of La Louisiane (Louisiana) in what was known as the Great Upheaval. (see Cajuns).

The parish was formed from the southwestern portion of St. Landry Parish, Louisiana. On May 19, 1886, a bill was introduced in the Louisiana state house entitled "An act to create the parish of Nicholls, and to provide for the organization thereof." The title was later changed to read: "An act to create the parish of Acadia." Father Joseph Anthonioz, the first pastor of the Catholic Church at Rayne, is credited with having suggested the name, Acadia Parish. The bill passed the house on June 11, the senate on June 28, and was approved by Governor Samuel D. McEnery on June 30.

On October 6, an election was held to affirm the creation of the parish, with 2,516 votes for and 1,521 votes against the creation. The population of the new parish was from 10,000 to 12,000. Acadia Parish population in 1890 was 13,231.

After a close election held on March 1, 1887, Crowley was chosen as the parish seat, gathering 698 votes to Rayne's and Prairie Hayes' 560 and 519, respectively. The election also determined the first officers in the parish: Elridge W. Lyons, first sheriff of Acadia; and R. T. Clark, first clerk of court. The first courthouse was constructed in Crowley and completed on June 30, 1888. It continued to be used until May 1, 1902, when it was destroyed to make way for the second building.

== Geography ==
According to the U.S. Census Bureau, the parish has a total area of 657 square miles (1,700 km^{2}), of which 655 sq mi (1,700 km^{2}) are land and 2.3 sq mi (6.0 km^{2}) (0.4%) are covered by water.

=== Major highways ===
- Interstate 10
- U.S. Highway 90
- U.S. Highway 190
- Louisiana Highway 13
- Louisiana Highway 35
- Louisiana Highway 91
- Louisiana Highway 92
- Louisiana Highway 95
- Louisiana Highway 97
- Louisiana Highway 98
- Louisiana Highway 100
- Louisiana Highway 178
- Louisiana Highway 343
- Louisiana Highway 356
- Louisiana Highway 358
- Louisiana Highway 365
- Louisiana Highway 367
- Louisiana Highway 368
- Louisiana Highway 370
- Louisiana Highway 723
- Louisiana Highway 751
- Louisiana Highway 754
- Louisiana Highway 755
- Louisiana Highway 1096
- Louisiana Highway 1097
- Louisiana Highway 1098
- Louisiana Highway 1099
- Louisiana Highway 1100
- Louisiana Highway 1101
- Louisiana Highway 1102
- Louisiana Highway 1104
- Louisiana Highway 1105
- Louisiana Highway 1106
- Louisiana Highway 1107
- Louisiana Highway 1108
- Louisiana Highway 1109
- Louisiana Highway 1110
- Louisiana Highway 1111
- Louisiana Highway 1113
- Louisiana Highway 1115
- Louisiana Highway 1119
- Louisiana Highway 1120
- Louisiana Highway 1121
- Louisiana Highway 1123
- Louisiana Highway 1124
- Louisiana Highway 3007
- Louisiana Highway 3067
- Louisiana Highway 3070
- Louisiana Highway 3116
- Louisiana Highway 3123
- Louisiana Highway 3289-1
- Louisiana Highway 3289-2

=== Adjacent parishes ===
- Evangeline Parish (north)
- St. Landry Parish (northeast)
- Lafayette Parish (east)
- Vermilion Parish (south)
- Jefferson Davis Parish (west)

== Communities ==
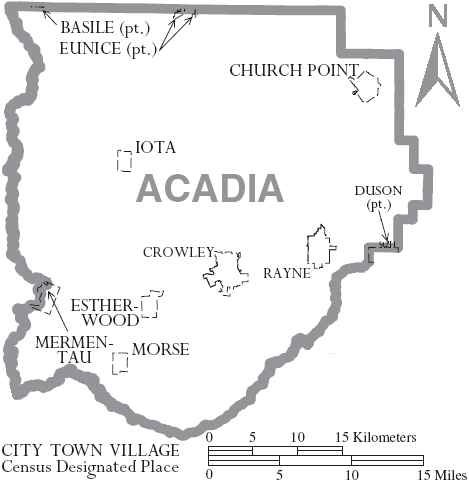
Map of Acadia Parish, with municipal labels

=== Cities ===
- Crowley (parish seat and largest municipality)
- Eunice (partly in St. Landry Parish)
- Rayne

=== Towns ===
- Basile (partly in Evangeline Parish)
- Church Point
- Duson (partly in Lafayette Parish)
- Iota

=== Villages ===
- Estherwood
- Mermentau
- Morse

=== Unincorporated areas ===
==== Census-designated places ====
- Branch
- Egan
- Midland

==== Other communities ====
- Arceneaux
- Bates
- Bluff
- Castile
- Deshotel
- Ebenezer
- Ellis
- Evangeline
- Frey
- Gatte's Cove
- Gumpoint
- Hundley
- Judd
- Keystone
- LeJeune Cove
- Link
- Little Japan
- Lyons Point
- Maxie
- Mermentau Cove
- Millerville
- Mire (formerly Marais Bouleur and Bosco)
- Mowata
- Peach Bloom
- Pitreville
- Pointe Noire
- Prairie Hayes
- Prudhomme
- Richard
- Ritchie
- Robert's Cove
- Rork
- Shortbread
- Tepetate
- Tortue
- Tee Mamou
- Whitehouse
- Williams

== Demographics ==
Historical population
Census	Pop.	Note	%±
1890	13,231		—
1900	23,483		77.5%
1910	31,847		35.6%
1920	34,820		9.3%
1930	39,326		12.9%
1940	46,260		17.6%
1950	47,050		1.7%
1960	49,931		6.1%
1970	52,109		4.4%
1980	56,427		8.3%
1990	55,882		−1.0%
2000	58,861		5.3%
2010	61,773		4.9%
2020	57,576		−6.8%
2025 (est.)	57,032	▼	−0.9%
U.S. Decennial Census; 1790–1960 1900–1990; 1990–2000 2010–2013

Acadia Parish, Louisiana – Racial and ethnic composition Note: the US Census treats Hispanic/Latino as an ethnic category. This table excludes Latinos from the racial categories and assigns them to a separate category. Hispanics/Latinos may be of any race.
Race / Ethnicity (NH = Non-Hispanic)	Pop 1980	Pop 1990	Pop 2000	Pop 2010	Pop 2020	% 1980	% 1990	% 2000	% 2010	% 2020
White alone (NH)	45,936	45,240	47,150	48,555	44,115	81.41%	80.96%	80.10%	78.60%	76.62%
Black or African American alone (NH)	9,734	10,140	10,705	11,133	9,946	17.25%	18.15%	18.19%	18.02%	17.27%
Native American or Alaska Native alone (NH)	23	47	110	155	145	0.04%	0.08%	0.19%	0.25%	0.25%
Asian alone (NH)	43	73	87	137	163	0.08%	0.13%	0.15%	0.22%	0.28%
Native Hawaiian or Pacific Islander alone (NH)	x	x	3	5	2	x	x	0.01%	0.01%	0.00%
Other race alone (NH)	28	10	29	43	99	0.05%	0.02%	0.05%	0.07%	0.17%
Mixed race or Multiracial (NH)	x	x	239	685	1,465	x	x	0.41%	1.11%	2.54%
Hispanic or Latino (any race)	663	372	538	1,060	1,641	1.17%	0.67%	0.91%	1.72%	2.85%
Total	56,427	55,882	58,861	61,773	57,576	100.00%	100.00%	100.00%	100.00%	100.00%

As of the 2020 United States census, there were 57,576 people, 22,236 households, and 15,519 families residing in the parish. At the 2010 United States census, 61,773 people were residing in the parish, and 58,861 people at the 2000 United States census. In 2019, the American Community Survey estimated 62,045 people lived in the parish.

According to the 2019 American Community Survey, the racial and ethnic makeup of the parish was 77.4% non-Hispanic white, 17.4% Black and African American, 0.1% American Indian and Alaska Native, 0.1% Asian alone, 0.3% some other race, 2.8% two or more races, and 2.6% Hispanic and Latin American of any race. In 2010, 79.5% were White American, 18.1% Black and African American, 0.3% American Indian and Alaska Native, 0.6% some other race, and 1.3% of two or more races; 1.7% were Hispanic or Latin American of any race.

Among the population in 2019, 73.8% were aged 18 and older, and 14.9% aged 65 and older; 7.0% were aged 5 and under. The median age was 36.7, and 27.4% were of French heritage; 9.3% were German, 4.2% English, 4.1% Irish, 0.5% sub-Saharan African, 0.4% Scottish, 0.1% Norwegian, and 0.1% Polish in ancestry. Among the population in 2010, 43.7% were of French, French Canadian or Cajun, 10.8% American, and 8.0% German ancestry. Approximately 10% of the parish spoke a language other than English at home.

There were 22,236 households spread among 26,435 housing units. There was a home-ownership rate of 71.1% with an average of 3.31 people per household; an estimated 32% of the population living in the parish were never married, and 26.2% of households had children under the age of 18 living in them. The median gross rent was $662, and the median household value was $118,000. The median monthly cost with a mortgage was $1,083, and $312 without a mortgage.

An estimated 1,120 businesses operated in the parish, and the median household income was $43,396; the mean income was $61,465. The parish had a 52.6% employment rate, and 24.2% of the total population lived at or below the poverty line in 2019.

== Arts and culture ==
Many festivals and cultural celebrations are held annually in Acadia Parish, including the International Rice Festival in Crowley, Frog Festival in Rayne, and Germanfest in Roberts Cove. Cajun food and music, both specialties of the local population, feature prominently in these festivals.

Several communities in Acadia Parish celebrate the tradition of Courir de Mardi Gras. Disguised with masks and costumes, Cajuns travel through their rural neighborhoods, making merry while begging for gumbo ingredients. The gumbo is the centerpiece of a communal supper and dance.

== Education ==
Acadia Parish is served by Acadia Parish Schools.

- Acadia Parish Head Start - Church Point
- Church Point Elementary (grades PK-5) (Church Point)
- Church Point Middle (grades 6–8) (Church Point)
- Church Point High (grades 9–12) (Church Point)
- Acadia Parish Head Start - Rayne
- Central Rayne Kindergarten (grades PK-1) (Rayne)
- Martin Petitjean Elementary (grades 1–3) (Rayne)
- South Rayne Elementary (grades 4–5) (Rayne)
- Armstrong Middle (grades 6–8) (Rayne)
- Rayne High (grades 9–12) (Rayne)
- Acadia Parish Head Start - Crowley
- Crowley Kindergarten (grades PK-K) (Crowley)
- North Crowley Elementary (grades K-5) (Crowley)
- Ross Elementary (grades K-5) (Crowley)
- South Crowley Elementary (grades K-5) (Crowley)
- Crowley Middle (grades 6–8) (Crowley)
- Iota Elementary (grades PK-5) (Iota)
- Iota Middle (grades 6–8) (Iota)
- Iota High (grades 9–12) (Iota)
- Acadia Parish Head Start - Estherwood
- Branch Elementary (grades PK-8) (Branch)
- Egan Elementary (grades PK-8) (Egan)
- Estherwood Elementary (grades PK-7) (Estherwood)
- Evangeline Elementary (grades PK-8) (Evangeline)
- Mermentau Elementary (grades PK-7) (Mermentau)
- Mire Elementary (grades PK-8) (unincorporated Rayne)
- Morse Elementary (grades PK-7) (Morse)
- Richard Elementary (grades PK-8) (unincorporated Church Point)
- Crowley High (grades 9–12) (unincorporated Crowley)
- Midland High (grades 8–12) (unincorporated Midland)

Acadia Parish is also served by the Roman Catholic Diocese of Lafayette with five schools:

- St. Francis School (grades PK-8) (Iota)
- Rayne Catholic Elementary School (grades PK-8) (Rayne)
- St. Michael Elementary School (grades PK-8) (Crowley)
- Our Mother of Peace Elementary School (grades PK-8) (Church Point)
- Notre Dame High School (grades 9–12) (Crowley)

Additionally, Acadia Parish is served by one unaffiliated private school:

- Northside Christian School (grades PK-12) (Crowley)

Acadia Parish is served by two institutions of higher education:

- Louisiana State University, Eunice (Eunice)
- South Louisiana Community College service area: Acadian Campus (Crowley)

Acadia Parish Library operates branches in the parish.

== National Guard ==
C Company 3-156TH Infantry Battalion resides in Crowley, Louisiana. As part of the 256th IBCT, this unit deployed to Iraq twice, 2004-5 and 2010.

== Politics ==
Historically, along with the rest of Louisiana, Acadia Parish strongly supported the Democratic Party, with support waning throughout the latter half of the 20th century. Following Bill Clinton's 1996 re-election bid, Acadia Parish has voted exclusively for Republican candidates at the presidential level.

United States presidential election results for Acadia Parish, Louisiana
Year	Republican		Democratic		Third party(ies)	
Year	No.	%	No.	%	No.	%
1912	51	3.34%	1,147	75.07%	330	21.60%
1916	202	14.54%	1,165	83.87%	22	1.58%
1920	1,141	51.75%	1,058	47.98%	6	0.27%
1924	691	30.20%	1,481	64.73%	116	5.07%
1928	1,071	22.77%	3,633	77.23%	0	0.00%
1932	351	8.92%	3,583	91.08%	0	0.00%
1936	441	8.92%	4,504	91.08%	0	0.00%
1940	719	12.44%	5,058	87.52%	2	0.03%
1944	1,023	18.73%	4,439	81.27%	0	0.00%
1948	784	11.74%	2,382	35.67%	3,512	52.59%
1952	4,167	41.55%	5,863	58.45%	0	0.00%
1956	4,204	39.97%	6,122	58.21%	191	1.82%
1960	2,616	17.34%	11,440	75.84%	1,028	6.82%
1964	6,706	41.47%	9,463	58.53%	0	0.00%
1968	3,178	18.70%	4,098	24.12%	9,715	57.18%
1972	9,698	63.83%	4,406	29.00%	1,090	7.17%
1976	6,296	35.68%	10,814	61.28%	538	3.05%
1980	11,533	52.19%	9,948	45.01%	619	2.80%
1984	14,906	60.59%	9,262	37.65%	434	1.76%
1988	11,319	48.98%	11,510	49.81%	281	1.22%
1992	9,017	36.70%	12,276	49.97%	3,275	13.33%
1996	9,246	38.64%	12,300	51.41%	2,381	9.95%
2000	13,814	59.45%	8,892	38.26%	532	2.29%
2004	16,083	63.75%	8,937	35.42%	210	0.83%
2008	19,229	71.99%	7,028	26.31%	454	1.70%
2012	19,931	74.27%	6,560	24.45%	344	1.28%
2016	21,162	77.26%	5,638	20.58%	589	2.15%
2020	22,596	79.49%	5,443	19.15%	386	1.36%
2024	21,783	81.52%	4,695	17.57%	242	0.91%

== Notable people ==
- Tommy Casanova (born 1950), former All-Pro NFL defensive back
- Wayne Toups (born 1958), popular Cajun musician, singer, and songwriter
- Bill Cleveland (1902–1974), real estate developer and former member of both houses of the Louisiana State Legislature
- Jo-El Sonnier (1946–2024), country and Cajun singer, songwriter, and accordionist
- Tony Thibodeaux (1938–2010), Cajun fiddler
- Joe Werner (1909–1978), early Cajun musician and member of the Hackberry Ramblers
- Camey Doucet (born 1939), Cajun musician and disc jockey
- Victory "Trey" Trahan, architect and Fellow of the American Institute of Architects
- George Stanley (1903–1970), sculptor for the design of the Oscar statue and the Muse Sculpture at the Hollywood Bowl
- Rosie Ledet (born 1971), Creole and zydeco musician and singer
- Jack Brooks (1922–2012), longtime U.S. Representative for Texas
- Seth Thibodeaux (born 1980), college baseball coach
- J. Bert Sonnier (born 1938), retired trainer of thoroughbred racehorses
- Taylor Ri'chard (born 1980), film director, screenwriter, executive producer, and actor
- Clint Brown (born 1963), gospel musician
- Barry Jean Ancelet (born 1951), Cajun folklorist in Louisiana French and ethnomusicologist in Cajun music
- Godfrey Zaunbrecher (born 1946), former NFL center
- Dudley Wilkins (1914–1989), 1934 United States triple jump champion and participant at 1936 Summer Olympics
- Gary Lavergne (born 1955), author
- J. Roy White (1907–1985), architect and artist
- Belton Richard (1939–2017), Cajun accordionist and vocalist
- Josh Reed (born 1980), former NFL wide receiver and 2001 recipient of the Biletnikoff Award
- Dave Petitjean (1928–2013), actor and humorist of Cajun stories
- Elvis Perrodin (1956–2012), jockey in Thoroughbred horse racing
- Byron Mouton (born 1978), former professional basketball player and member of 2002 national championship team at the University of Maryland
- Gerard Melancon (born 1967), jockey in Thoroughbred horse racing
- Mark Carrier (born 1965), former NFL wide receiver and current Buffalo Bills player engagement director
- Victoria Anne Kennedy (born 1954), current United States Ambassador to Austria
- Elmore Nixon (1933–1975), jump blues pianist and singer
- Kidd Jordan (1935–2023), jazz saxophonist and music educator
- Chris John (born 1960), lobbyist and former U.S. Representative
- Lee Benoit (born 1959), Cajun musician
- Donnie Meche (born 1974), jockey in Thoroughbred horse racing
- Leroy Leblanc (1915–1988), Cajun swing musician
- Mike Heinen (born 1967), professional golfer
- Alyson Habetz (born 1971), current softball head coach at the University of Louisiana-Lafayette
- Mary Alice Fontenot (1910–2003), journalist and author of children's books and books on Louisiana history
- Orlando Thomas (1972–2014), former NFL defensive back
- Johnny Rebel (1938–2016), controversial singer, songwriter, and musician who performed songs that were supportive of white supremacy
- John Stefanski (born 1984), attorney and member of Louisiana House of Representatives
- Johnnie Allan (born 1938), musician and singer who pioneered the swamp pop musical genre
- Sherman Andrus (born 1942), gospel singer and former member of The Imperials
- J.D. "Jay" Miller (1922–1996), record producer and songwriter
- Larry Miller (born 1936), retired Cajun accordion maker
- Buford Jordan (born 1962), former NFL running back
- Ed Zaunbrecher (born 1950), former college football coach
- Sidney Brown (1906–1981), musician and noted Cajun accordion builder
- Jim Gueno (born 1954), former NFL linebacker
- John Breaux (born 1944), lobbyist, attorney and retired former U.S. Representative and U.S. Senator
- Edwin Edwards (1927–2021), 50th Governor of Louisiana who started his political career on the Crowley City Council
- Tony Robichaux (1961–2019), former head baseball coach at University of Louisiana at Lafayette and McNeese State University
- Irene Whitfield Holmes (1900–1993), ethnomusicologist and educator

== See also ==
- National Register of Historic Places listings in Acadia Parish, Louisiana
