= Acadia Parish School Board =

School district in Louisiana, United States

Address
- Physical: 2402 North Parkerson Avenue; Crowley, LA 70526 (337) 783-3664 Mailing: PO Drawer 309; Crowley, LA 70527-0309 Acadia Parish United States
- Coordinates: 30.229735°N 92.381362°W

District information
- Type: Public
- Motto: Reaching Every Child Every Day
- Grades: K-12
- Established: July 11, 1887
- President: James Higginbotham
- Vice-president: James Etta David
- Superintendent: Carol Tall
- Schools: 27
- NCES District ID: 2200030
- District ID: LA-001

Students and staff
- Students: 9,834
- Teachers: 484.48
- Staff: 540.1
- Student–teacher ratio: 20.30

Other information
- Website: www.acadia.k12.la.us

Acadia Parish School Board is a school district headquartered in Crowley, Louisiana, United States. The district serves all of Acadia Parish.

== Current board members ==
As of 2023:

- District 1: James Etta David
- District 2: Frances Reagan Miller
- District 3: Delo Hebert
- District 4: Rebecca Foux Atkinson
- District 5: Steve Jones
- District 6: Ike Richard
- District 7: James Higginbotham
- District 8: Milton R. Simar

== Notable board members ==
- John Travis Nixon (1867-1909), publisher of what became The Crowley Post Signal

== School uniforms ==
Beginning in the 1999–2000 school year, the school district requires all students to wear school uniforms." Acadia Parish School Board.

== Schools ==
=== Preschool ===
- Central Rayne Kindergarten (Rayne)
- Crowley Kindergarten (Crowley)

=== Elementary schools ===
- Branch Elementary (Branch)
- Church Point Elementary (Church Point)
- Egan Elementary (Egan)
- Estherwood Elementary (Estherwood)
- Evangeline Elementary (Evangeline)
- Iota Elementary (Iota)
- Martin Petitjean Elementaryl (Rayne)
- Mermentau Elementary (Mermentau)
- Mire Elementary (Rayne)
- Morse Elementary (Morse)
- North Crowley Elementary (Crowley)
- Richard Elementary (Church Point)
- Ross Elementary (Crowley)
- South Crowley Elementary (Crowley)
- South Rayne Elementary (Rayne)

=== Middle schools ===
- Armstrong Middle (Rayne)
- Church Point Middle (Church Point)
- Crowley Middle (Crowley)
- Iota Middle (Iota)

=== High schools ===
- Church Point High (Church Point)
- Crowley High (Crowley)
- Iota High (Iota)
- Midland High (Midland)
- Rayne High School (Rayne)

=== Alternative Education ===
- Acadia Parish Alternative (Crowley)
