= Iota, Louisiana =

- Town
- Town of Iota
- Location of Iota in Acadia Parish, Louisiana

- Location of Louisiana in the United States
- Coordinates: 30°19′35″N 92°29′56″W
- Country: United States
- State: Louisiana
- Parish: Acadia

Area
  - Total: 1.27 sq mi (3.29 km^{2})
  - Land: 1.27 sq mi (3.29 km^{2})
  - Water: 0 sq mi (0.00 km^{2})
- Elevation: 30 ft (9.1 m)

Population (2020)
  - Total: 1,304
  - Density: 1,026.7/sq mi (396.42/km^{2})
- Time zone: UTC-6 (CST)
  - Summer (DST): UTC-5 (CDT)
- Zip Code: 70543
- Area Code: 337
- FIPS code: 22-37410
- GNIS feature ID: 2405891

Iota is a town in Acadia Parish, Louisiana. The population was 1,304 in 2020. Iota is part of the Crowley Micropolitan Statistical Area.

== History ==
The history of Iota is identified with Pointe-aux-Loups (French for Wolf Point), one of the oldest place names in southwest Louisiana, and the location of mineral springs that attracted many visitors beginning about 1858. The older settlement was located on Bayou des Cannes about two miles west of the present Town of Iota. A post office named Cartville, for the first postmaster Samuel Cart, was established in the vicinity of Pointe-aux-Loups in 1884. Ten years later, a railroad branch line from Midland to Eunice bypassed Cartville by a mile or so to the east. The railroad company built a depot at a point on the line nearest to the Cartville and Pointe-aux-Loups settlements, naming it Iota. The Cartville post office was changed to Iota in 1900.

C.C. Duson is credited with being the founder of Iota. It was he who promoted the construction of the Southern Pacific rail line to Eunice, the new town that he founded in St. Landry Parish. At the same time, 1894, Duson acquired the land on which Iota now stands, a 160-acre tract which had been homesteaded by Archille Doucet in 1835. Duson divided the land into town lots and sold them. Duson was the prime mover in the establishment of the Acadia Canal Company in the vicinity of Iota, and president of the town's first rice mill in 1901—two businesses said to have been responsible for Iota's early economic development.

Iota and its people continued to prosper throughout the 20th century, with agriculture and petroleum as the primary sectors of the local economy. During this time, rice and later crawfish developed as the main cash crops of the area.

In the 1990s, it was discovered that Iota has an unusually high number of people carrying Tay–Sachs disease, a rare genetic disorder.

Iota was represented in the novel No Place Louisiana by Martin Pousson, published in 2002.

Iota is the home of American Legion Post No. 371 and many veterans of foreign wars.

== Geography ==
According to the United States Census Bureau, the town has a total area of 1.3 square miles (3.3 km^{2}), all land.

== Demographics ==
Historical population
Census	Pop.	Note	%±
1910	769		—
1920	802		4.3%
1930	827		3.1%
1940	1,000		20.9%
1950	1,162		16.2%
1960	1,245		7.1%
1970	1,271		2.1%
1980	1,326		4.3%
1990	1,256		−5.3%
2000	1,376		9.6%
2010	1,500		9.0%
2020	1,304		−13.1%
2025 (est.)	1,253	▼	−3.9%
U.S. Decennial Census

Iota racial composition as of 2020
Race	Number	Percentage
White (non-Hispanic)	1,169	89.65%
Black or African American (non-Hispanic)	68	5.21%
Native American	2	0.15%
Other/Mixed	34	2.61%
Hispanic or Latino	31	2.38%

As of the 2020 United States census, there were 1,304 people, 648 households, and 409 families residing in the town.

== Arts and culture ==
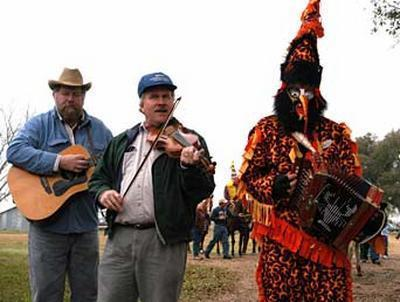
Mardi Gras celebration near Iota

The annual Iota Mardi Gras Folklife Festival attracts thousands of tourists and visitors, offering authentic Cajun food, music and crafts. In contrast to the elaborate costumes and parades of urban Carnival krewes, in Iota and nearby rural communities like Tee Mamou and LeJeune Cove, Cajuns celebrate Courir de Mardi Gras. Disguised with masks, costumes, and conical hats called capuchons, the townspeople travel through the surrounding countryside, making merry while begging for money and gumbo ingredients. The gumbo is the centerpiece of a communal supper and dance, where the Mardi Gras riders sing the Chanson de Mardi Gras, an old Cajun French drinking and begging song, and then take off their masks to reveal, ostensibly for the first time that day, the identity of each rider.

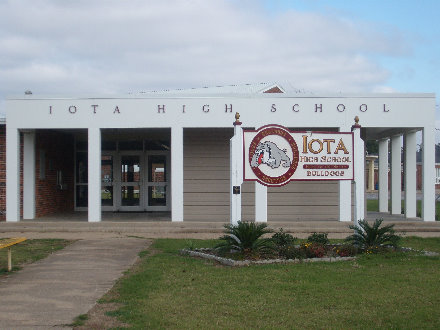
Iota High School

== Education ==
Acadia Parish School Board serves Iota, operating Iota High School. St. Francis Catholic School is also located in the district.
