= Crowley High School =

Crowley High School may refer to:

- Crowley High School (Louisiana) in Crowley, Louisiana
- Crowley High School (Texas) in Crowley, Texas

Schools with similar names include:

- North Crowley High School in Fort Worth, Texas

In fiction:

- Crowley High School is the name of the fictional high school in the television series Todd and the Book of Pure Evil.
- Crowley High School is the name of a fictional high school in the episode "Die Hand Die Verletzt" of the television series The X-Files.
