= Notre Dame High School (Crowley, Louisiana) =

Location
- 910 North Eastern Avenue; Crowley, (Acadia Parish), Louisiana 70526; United States; 30°13′18″N 92°22′3″W

Information
- Type: Private, Coeducational
- Religious affiliation: Catholic
- Established: 1967
- Status: Open
- Principal: John Wendell Prudhomme
- Chancellor: Fr. Brent Smith
- Grades: 9–12
- Colors: Scarlet and navy
- Athletics: Football; Men's Basketball; Women's Basketball; Baseball; Softball; Men's Golf; Women's Golf; Men's Tennis; Women's Tennis; Men's Track & Field; Women's Track & Field; Women's Volleyball; Bowling; Power-lifting
- Mascot: Pioneer
- Nickname: Pios
- Team name: Pioneers
- Accreditation: Southern Association of Colleges and Schools
- Yearbook: The Image
- Feeder schools: St. Michael Elementary (Crowley); Rayne Catholic School (Rayne); St. Francis School (Iota); Our Mother of Peace Elementary (Church Point)
- Website: ndpios.com

Notre Dame High School is a private, Catholic high school in Crowley, Louisiana. It was formed in 1967 by consolidating the three Catholic high schools in Acadia Parish; St. Michael of Crowley, St. Joseph of Rayne, and St. Francis of Iota. It is located in the Roman Catholic Diocese of Lafayette.

== Notre Dame's shield ==
Notre Dame's shield symbolizes the three principal Catholic ethnic groups which originally settled the area of Acadia: The German people are symbolized by the heraldic eagle, displayed with wings and outstretched legs; the Lebanese are represented by the Lebanon Cedar; and the Fleur-de-lis (or white lily), a religious symbol, is the national symbol of France.

== History ==
Notre Dame High School of Acadia Parish began its operation as a Catholic, co-educational school for students in grades 9–12 in September 1967. It was formed by consolidating the three Catholic high schools in Acadia Parish; Saint Michael in Crowley, Saint Joseph in Rayne, and Saint Francis in Iota. At the time of consolidation it was decided that the facilities of St. Michael be used until Notre Dame could build its own facility or make some other arrangements. On January 31, 1977, the Notre Dame School Board of Directors and seven church parishes purchased proportionate shares of Notre Dame from St. Michael Parish thus giving Notre Dame a permanent home.

Preceding the consolidation, committees under the direction of Father Robert Sibille, composed of faculty members and students from all three schools, met and selected possible uniforms, school colors, mascots, emblems and size. A school philosophy was written and curriculum and faculty began to take shape.

The Catholic Church parishes actively participating in the government of the school are: St. Michael, Crowley; St. Joseph, Rayne; St. Francis, Iota; Immaculate Heart of Mary, Crowley; St. Lawrence, Mowata; St. Leo IV, Roberts Cove; St. John the Baptist, Lyons Point; and Immaculate Conception, Morse. Each church parish provides leadership in the government of the school and each financially subsidizes the school based on the number of students who attend the school from the parish. Board members are elected lay people from each parish and a priest-chancellor who represents the pastors of the eight church parishes.

Notre Dame is accredited by Southern Association of Colleges and Schools (SACS), the Louisiana State Board of Education, and it is a diocesan school under the direction of the Office of Catholic Schools of the Diocese of Lafayette. The school undergoes periodic professional self-study under the direction of the Diocesan School Board's professional staff and the SACS accreditation team.

== The meaning of Notre Dame ==
"Notre Dame" is French for Our Lady. Mary, the Mother of Christ is the patroness of the school, and her statue stands in the center of the campus.

== Athletics ==
Notre Dame High athletics competes in the LHSAA.

=== Championships ===
The Notre Dame football program has won six state championships in 1973, 1976, 2000, 2009, 2015, and 2018.

Non-football state championships include: baseball, softball, men's tennis, men's track & field, and women's volleyball.

=== Football ===
==== Coaches ====
- Lewis Cook - Cook has won four state championships at Notre Dame in 2000, 2009, 2015 and 2018. Cook also won the 1989 3A state championship at Crowley High School.

== Notable alumni ==
- Tommy Casanova (Born 1950), former NFL player, politician
- Chris John (Born 1960), former Louisiana and U.S. representative
- Tyler Shelvin (Born 1998), former NFL player
- Tony Robichaux (1961–2019), former head baseball coach at McNeese State University and University of Louisiana at Lafayette
