= Tyler Shelvin =

American football player (born 1998)

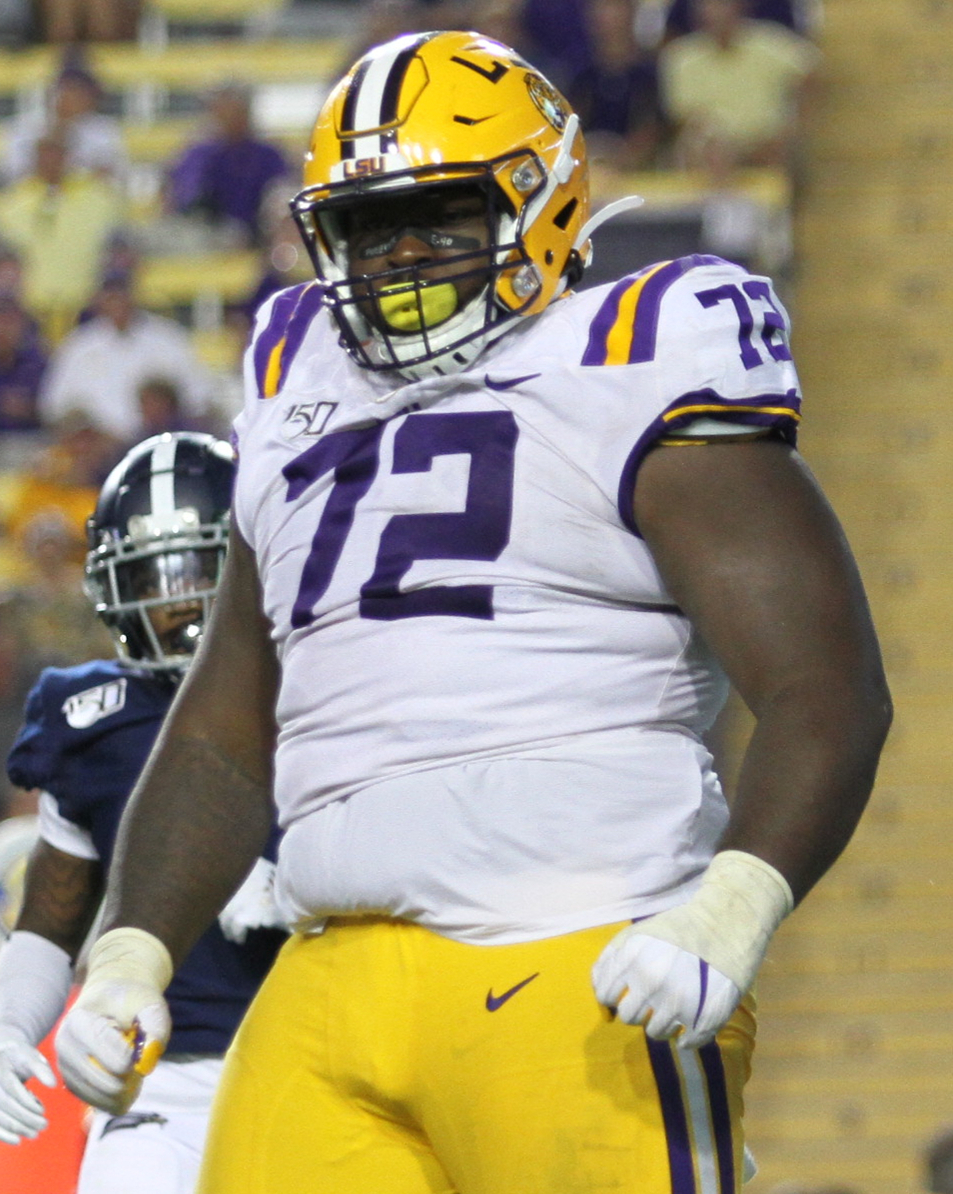
- Shelvin with the LSU Tigers in 2019

Profile
- Position: Nose tackle

Personal information
- Born: July 22, 1998 (age 28); Lafayette, Louisiana, U.S.
- Listed height: 6 ft 2 in (1.88 m)
- Listed weight: 350 lb (159 kg)

Career information
- High school: Notre Dame (Crowley, Louisiana)
- College: LSU (2017–2020)
- NFL draft: 2021: 4th round, 122nd overall pick

Career history
- Cincinnati Bengals (2021–2022); Tennessee Titans (2023)*
- * Offseason or practice squad member only

Awards and highlights
- CFP national champion (2019)

Career NFL statistics
- Total tackles: 4
- Stats at Pro Football Reference

Tyler Shelvin (born July 22, 1998) is an American professional football nose tackle. He played college football at LSU.

== Early life ==
Shelvin started his high school career at Northside High School in Lafayette, Louisiana, playing kicker, punter and defensive lineman in addition to playing on the basketball team. At Northside, Shelvin participated in the Under Armour Future 50 in early 2016. After academic issues led to a transfer to Notre Dame High School in Crowley, Louisiana, Shelvin was the number one recruit in the state of Louisiana and a four-star prospect according to 247Sports.com. He committed to Louisiana State on March 11, 2015, choosing the Tigers over offers from Alabama and Nebraska. After committing, however, Shelvin visited the Alabama campus and also received interest from Mississippi State and Texas A&M. Shelvin participated in the Under Armour All-America Game after his senior season.

== College career ==
Due to NCAA rules, Shelvin was an academic redshirt during his true freshman season. Sitting at third-string on the depth chart at nose tackle during his redshirt freshman season, Shelvin was suspended for two weeks by the team for discipline issues. He cracked the starting lineup during his sophomore season. He won a national championship with LSU during his 2019 sophomore season. On January 15, 2020, Shelvin announced his intention to stay in college for his junior season.

== Professional career ==
Pre-draft measurables
Height	Weight	Arm length	Hand span	40-yard dash	10-yard split	20-yard split	20-yard shuttle	Three-cone drill	Vertical jump	Broad jump
6 ft 2 1/8 in (1.88 m)	350 lb (159 kg)	33 5/8 in (0.85 m)	10 1/4 in (0.26 m)	5.38 s	1.90 s	3.13 s	5.08 s	8.15 s	28.5 in (0.72 m)	8 ft 1 in (2.46 m)
All values from Pro Day

=== Cincinnati Bengals ===
Shelvin was drafted by the Cincinnati Bengals in the fourth round, 122nd overall, of the 2021 NFL draft. He signed his four-year rookie contract with Cincinnati on May 17.

Playing sparingly, Shelvin played in 3 regular season games as a rookie, recording 4 tackles in a week 18 loss to the Cleveland Browns. After being declared inactive during the Bengals' Wild Card win against the Las Vegas Raiders, Shelvin would play in the Bengals' playoff wins against the Tennessee Titans and Kansas City Chiefs respectively, however Shelvin recorded no stats in either playoff game. Shelvin did not play in the Bengals' 23–20 loss in Super Bowl LVI.

On August 30, 2022, Shelvin was waived by the Bengals and signed to the practice squad the next day. He was released on December 6.

=== Tennessee Titans ===
On January 23, 2023, Shelvin signed a reserve/future contract with the Titans. He was waived on August 29.
