= Victoria Reggie Kennedy =

American diplomat, attorney, and activist (born 1954)

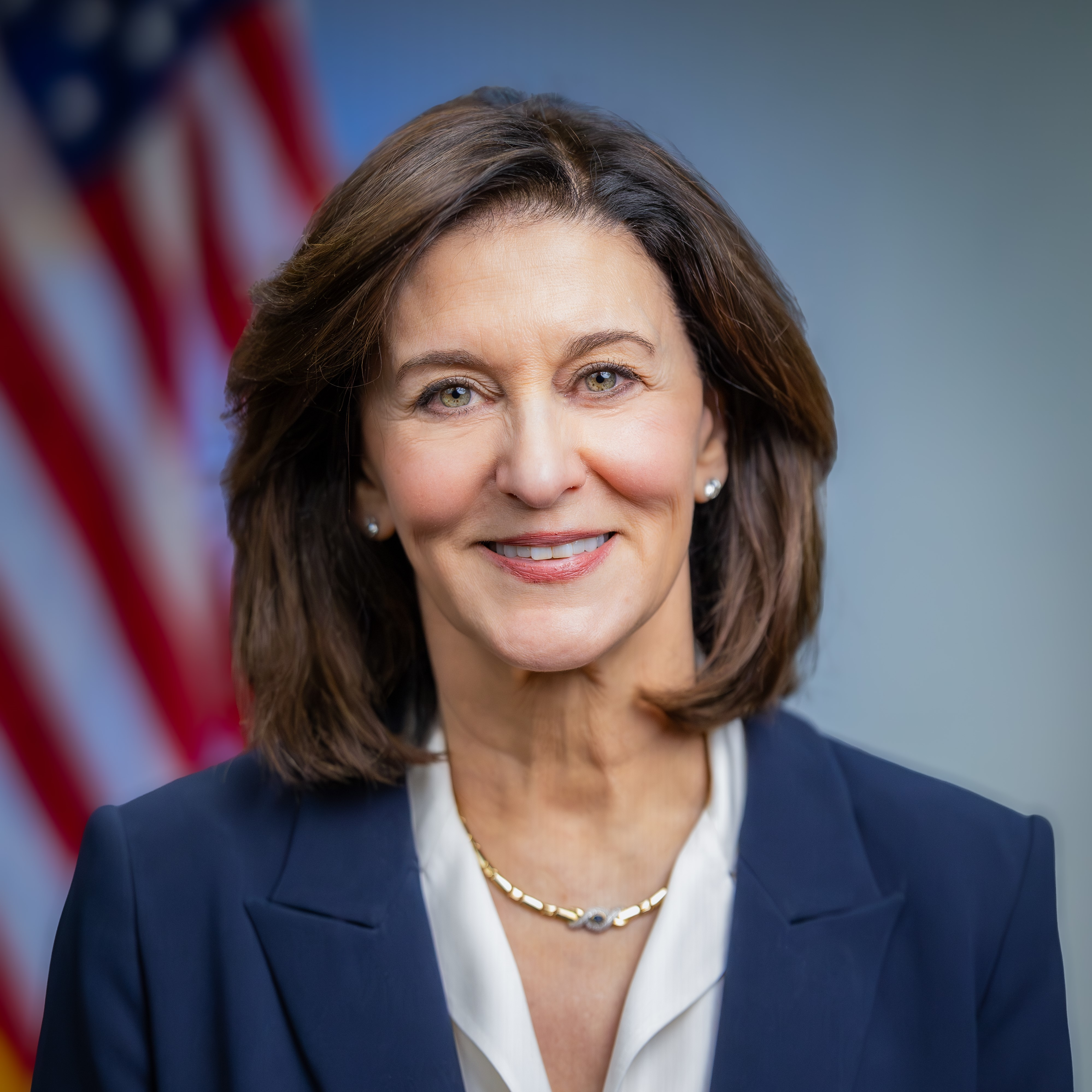
- Official portrait, 2024

United States Ambassador to Austria
- In office January 12, 2022 – January 20, 2025
- President: Joe Biden
- Preceded by: Trevor Traina
- Succeeded by: Arthur Fisher

Personal details
- Born: Victoria Anne Reggie; February 26, 1954 (age 72) Crowley, Louisiana, U.S.
- Party: Democratic
- Spouses: Grier Raclin (m. 1981; div. 1990) Ted Kennedy (m. 1992; died 2009)
- Children: 2
- Relatives: Kennedy family (by marriage)
- Education: Tulane University (BA, JD)

Victoria Anne Reggie Kennedy (née Reggie; born February 26, 1954) is an American diplomat, attorney, and activist who served as the United States Ambassador to Austria from 2022 to 2025. She is the widow and the second wife of longtime U.S. senator Ted Kennedy.

A member of the Kennedy family through her late husband, Kennedy was born in Louisiana and became a practicing attorney after attending Tulane University Law School. As a partner at Keck, Mahin & Cate, she specialized in financial law. She was appointed as ambassador by President Joe Biden in 2021 and confirmed unanimously by the US Senate.

== Early life and education ==
The second of six children, Victoria Anne Reggie was born in Crowley in Acadia Parish in southwestern Louisiana. Her father, Edmund Reggie (1926–2013), was a Louisiana judge and banker, and her mother, Doris Ann (née Boustany), was a Democratic National committeewoman. Reggie is of Lebanese descent, as all of her grandparents were Maronites from Lebanon who immigrated to the United States and later settled to Louisiana. Reggie's grandparents became important members of the local Roman Catholic church, and later their children became involved in business and politics. Her brother is Denis Reggie, a photographer who popularized the genre of wedding photojournalism.

Reggie's immediate family was wealthy because of money from her maternal family's interest in the Bunny Bread baking concern in New Orleans. She was raised in a family that was constantly involved in politics and campaigns. At the 1956 Democratic National Convention, her father helped deliver his state for John F. Kennedy's unsuccessful bid for the vice-presidential nomination. Over time, John Kennedy developed a close social relationship with the Reggies. Her mother cast the only Louisiana delegate vote for Ted Kennedy at the 1980 Democratic National Convention.

Victoria Reggie attended parochial schools growing up and was a straight-A student. She attended Newcomb College at Tulane University in New Orleans, where she graduated with a Bachelor of Arts in English, magna cum laude, was elected to Phi Beta Kappa and was president of the Kappa Alpha Theta sorority. She then received her Juris Doctor degree, summa cum laude in 1979 from Tulane University Law School. There she was a member of the Tulane Law Review. Her education at Tulane, along with twenty years of Tulane tuition for her brothers and sisters, was paid for by scholarships awarded by a political ally of her father.

== Career ==
After law school, Reggie clerked for Judge Robert Arthur Sprecher at the U.S. Court of Appeals for the Seventh Circuit in Chicago. As an attorney, she specialized in banking law.

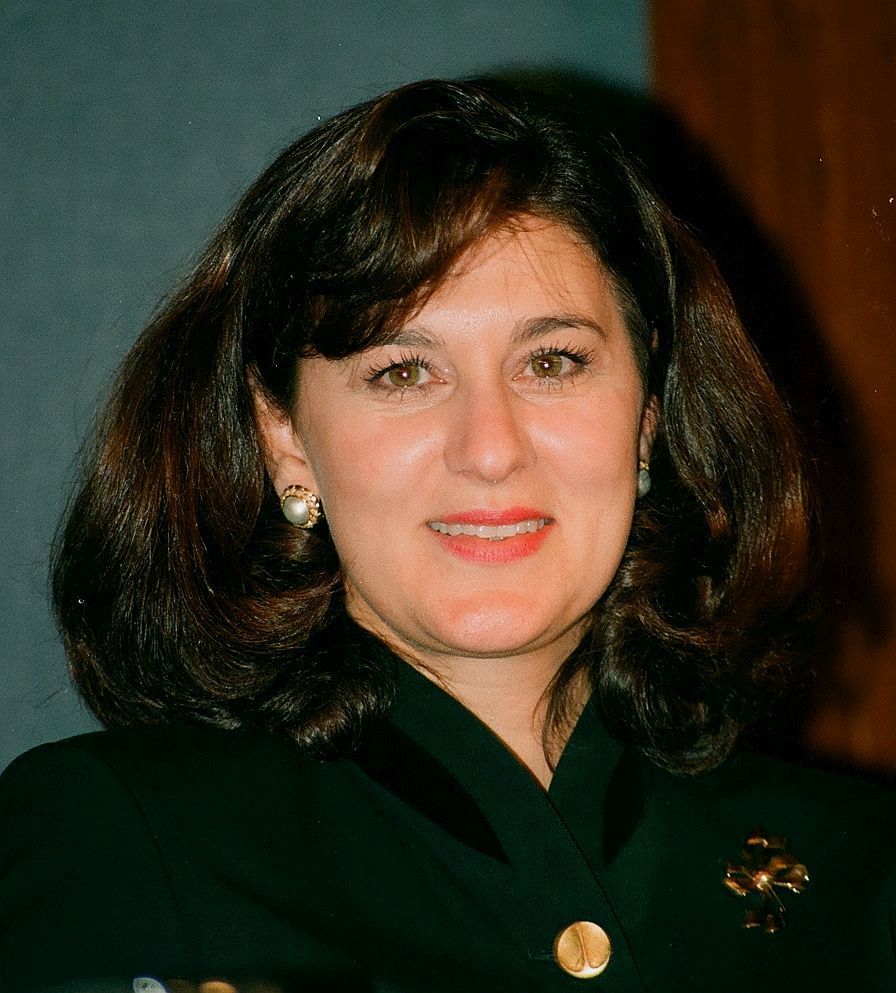
Kennedy in 2002

=== Gun control advocacy ===
Kennedy is president and co-founder of Common Sense about Kids and Guns, an advocacy group begun in 1999 which seeks to reduce gun deaths and injuries to children in the U.S. She is a member of the board of trustees of the Brady Center to Prevent Gun Violence, and has served on the board of Stop Handgun Violence in Boston. She is a board member of Catholic Democrats and authored the preface for their 2009 book The Catholic Case for Obama.

=== Activities ===
Reports indicated that the Senator Kennedy expressed the wish that his wife would succeed him in office, and speculation towards that possibility continued during his illness.

Upon his death, some thought that she would be appointed by then-Governor Deval Patrick to take the Senator's seat until the special election could take place, but she declined and the governor instead appointed long-time Kennedy associate Paul G. Kirk. Some Democratic officials hoped she would agree to run for Senate to finish out her husband's term, but she declined again and instead endorsed Martha Coakley for the special election to fill the vacant seat. Coakley was defeated by Scott Brown. A year later, speculation continued as some noted Democrats saw her as their best chance to take back Senator Kennedy's former seat from Brown and the Republicans in the 2012 election; however, she again declined, and the Democratic nomination was awarded to Elizabeth Warren, who went on to defeat Brown in November 2012.

Kennedy was invited to speak at the spring commencement of the Catholic Anna Maria College in Paxton, Massachusetts, but at the request of Bishop Robert Joseph McManus of the Diocese of Worcester, Kennedy was disinvited by the college. The bishop and other Catholic organizations had expressed reservations about a stalwart pro-choice advocate like Kennedy speaking at a Catholic university.

In February 2014, U.S. President Barack Obama nominated her to serve as a governor of the United States Postal Service (a member of the Board of Governors of the United States Postal Service), for a term expiring December 8, 2016. Had she been confirmed, Kennedy would assume the board seat being vacated by Carolyn L. Gallagher. The nomination expired with the end of Obama's term as president.

=== U.S. ambassador to Austria ===
In 2021, U.S. President Joe Biden nominated Kennedy to serve as the Ambassador Extraordinary and Plenipotentiary to Austria. In mid-June, the office of Austrian President Alexander Van der Bellen had confirmed the required "agreement" for Kennedy's appointment was issued. On October 5, 2021, a hearing on her nomination was held before the Senate Foreign Relations Committee. On October 19, 2021, her nomination was reported favorably out of committee. On October 26, 2021, Kennedy was confirmed by the Senate by voice vote. Her swearing in as the United States Ambassador to Austria took place at Edward M. Kennedy Institute for the United States Senate on November 16, 2021, with Supreme Court Justice Stephen Breyer administering her oath of office. She arrived in Vienna on January 7, 2022, and presented her credentials to President Alexander Van der Bellen on January 12, 2022.

== Personal life ==
She met her first husband, Grier C. Raclin, a telecommunications attorney (who later became a senior executive at Charter Communications in St. Louis, Missouri), when they clerked together at the Everett McKinley Dirksen Federal Courthouse. Their 1981 church wedding was in Crowley and "feted four hundred guests with a week's worth of parties."

Following marriage, the couple moved to Washington, D.C., where she practiced banking and savings and loan law and restructuring and bankruptcy law for Keck, Mahin & Cate. She was made partner there, and was known to be "charismatic and hard-driving" and a tough negotiator in settlement talks and "as a real star" for her ability to work on complicated financial transactions. Reggie and Raclin had two children, Curran (born 1982) and Caroline (born 1985). They were divorced in 1990. Upon her divorce, she was left to juggle her career as a lawyer with her role as a single mother of two young children.

In 2011, Reggie made an effort to transfer the Massachusetts Kennedy compound to the Edward M. Kennedy Institute. Her desire to transfer the Kennedy compound put Reggie at odds with her two stepsons through her marriage to Ted Kennedy.

=== Marriage to Ted Kennedy ===
Kennedy and Reggie began dating in June 1991 after meeting at a party celebrating her parents' 40th wedding anniversary. Ted Kennedy said of this meeting, "I had known Vicki before, but this was the first time I think I really saw her." The relationship became serious in September 1991. They were engaged in March 1992, and married July 3, 1992, in a civil ceremony at his home in McLean, Virginia. His political career had suffered from a long period of womanizing, drinking, and adverse publicity, and she is credited with allegedly stabilizing his personal life and helping him resume a productive career in the Senate. Kennedy was also reportedly devoted to her two children.

In Ted Kennedy's 1994 senatorial re-election campaign against moderate Republican Mitt Romney, she was credited by The New York Times with "giving him a political advantage in a difficult contest." For a Boston, Massachusetts, reception she organized, 1,200 influential New England women met five of Kennedy's Senate colleagues. Reggie became Ted's principal assistant and closest political advisor. By 1997, she no longer practiced law. Following Ted Kennedy's May 2008 diagnosis of brain cancer, Reggie became his primary caregiver.

== Footnotes ==
Diplomatic posts
| Preceded by Trevor Traina | United States Ambassador to Austria; 2022–2025 | Succeeded by Arthur Fisher |
