= Le Vieux Presbytere =

- U.S. National Register of Historic Places
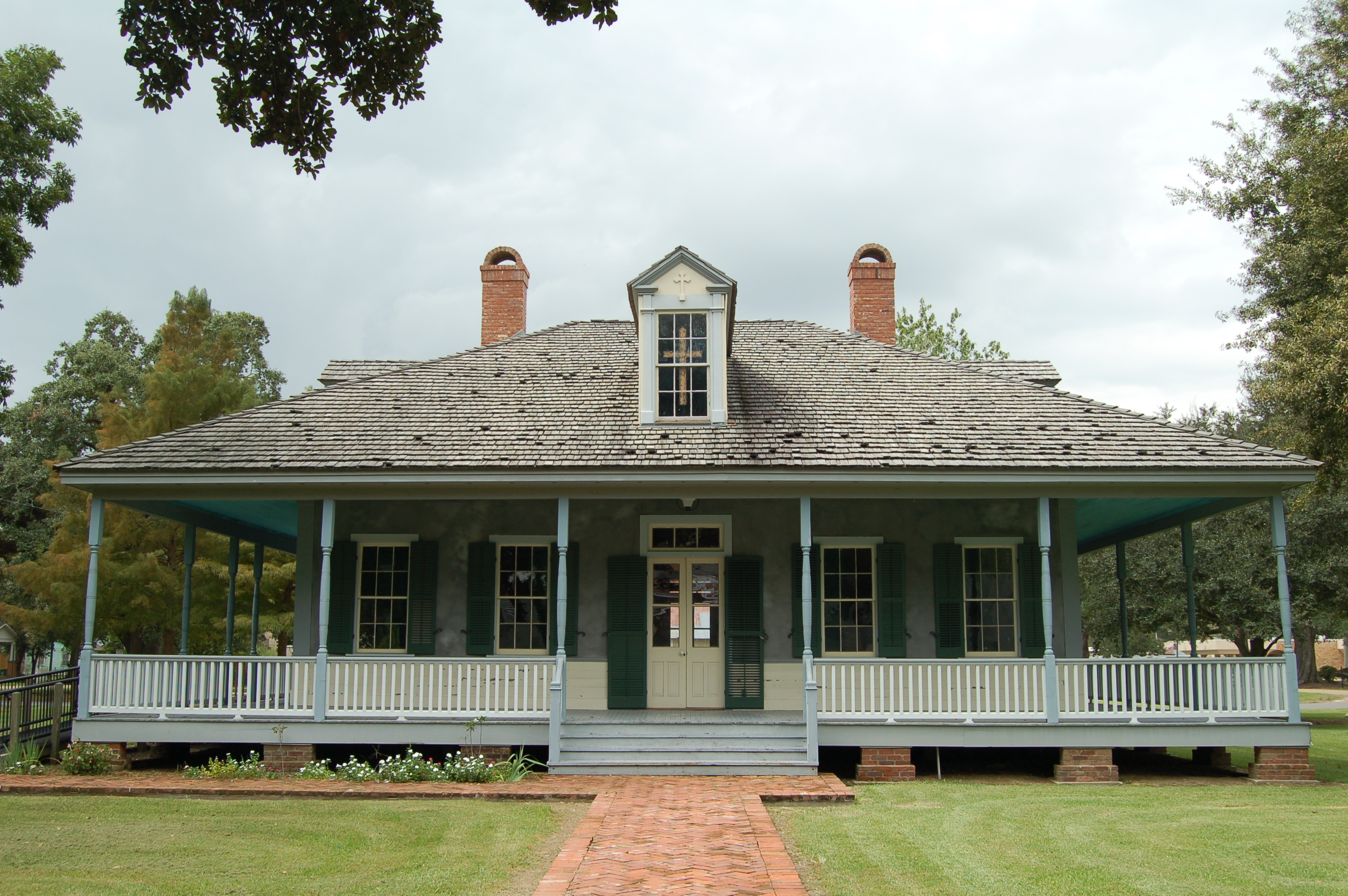

- Location within Louisiana
- Location: 205 Rue Iry Lejeune, Church Point, Louisiana
- Coordinates: 30.40621°N 92.21544°W
- Area: less than one acre
- Built: 1887
- Architectural style: Stick/eastlake, Italianate
- MPS: Louisiana's French Creole Architecture MPS
- NRHP reference No.: 97000508
- Added to NRHP: May 30, 1997

Le Vieux Presbytere, is a house located in Church Point in Acadia Parish, Louisiana. It was listed on the National Register of Historic Places in 1997. It originally served as a presbytery, and now stands as the town's museum.

It was located at 205 Rue Iry Lejeune, and had been moved twice from its original location.

It is a one-and-one-half story frame bousillage house, across from the church square in the small community of Church Point.

== History and structure ==
In 1883, French priest Auguste Vincente Eby took over the pastorship of the Catholic parish in Church Point, and decided to build a new church structure over the existing Jesuit chapel that was there before. Eby then built a home for himself in 1887.

As a presbytery, the building housed Church Point's priests for at least 100 years. The building is 40 ft. by 40 ft., made of bousillage and is surrounded on all sides by a wide porch.
