= Church Point High School =

Public school in Church Point, Louisiana, United States

Location
- 305 East Lougarre Street; Church Point, Louisiana 70525; United States; 30.4000°N 92.2103°W

Information
- Type: Public, coeducational
- Status: Open
- School board: Acadia Parish School Board
- Superintendent: Carol Tall
- Principal: Lee Ward Bellard
- Staff: 32.05 (FTE)
- Grades: 9–12
- Student to teacher ratio: 16.69
- Hours in school day: 7
- Campus type: Open/partial security
- Colors: Black and gold
- Slogan: "Committed to the Success of ALL Students"
- Athletics conference: LHSAA
- Mascot: Louisiana Black Bear
- Team name: Bears
- Rival: Kaplan Pirates; Livonia Wildcats; Eunice Bobcats; Rayne Wolves; Iota Bulldogs
- Yearbook: L’Ours
- Feeder schools: Church Point Middle School (Church Point); Richard Elementary School (unincorporated Church Point)
- Website: cphs.acadia.k12.la.us

Church Point High School (CPHS) is a senior high school serving students in grades 9–12 in Church Point, Louisiana, and other communities, such as Richard, Branch, and Mire. It is a part of the Acadia Parish School Board.

Its mascot is the Louisiana black bear.

== Athletics ==
Church Point High athletics competes in the LHSAA.

list of sports:

- M baseball
- M/W basketball
- Cheerleading
- Dance team
- M football
- M/W golf
- M/W powerlifting
- W softball
- M/W athletics
- W volleyball
- M wrestling

== Notable alumni ==
- Gary Lavergne, author
