= Jim Gueno =

American football player (born 1954)

No. 51
- Position: Linebacker

Personal information
- Born: January 15, 1954 (age 72); Crowley, Louisiana, U.S.
- Listed height: 6 ft 2 in (1.88 m)
- Listed weight: 220 lb (100 kg)

Career information
- High school: Crowley
- College: Tulane
- NFL draft: 1976: 9th round, 245th overall pick

Career history
- Green Bay Packers (1976–1980)

Career NFL statistics
- Sacks: 1
- Fumble recoveries: 4
- Stats at Pro Football Reference

James Andre Gueno (born January 15, 1954) is an American former professional football player who was a linebacker in the National Football League (NFL). He played college football for the Tulane Green Wave.

== Early life ==
Gueno was born James Andre Gueno on January 15, 1954, in Crowley, Louisiana.

== Career ==
Gueno played football at the collegiate level for Tulane University.

Gueno was selected by the Green Bay Packers in the ninth round of the 1976 NFL draft and played with the team for five seasons. His main contributions were on the Packers' special teams, eventually earning the title of special teams captain.
