= Mowata, Louisiana =

Mowata
- Unincorporated community
- Location of Mowata in Louisiana
- Coordinates: 30°23′31″N 92°24′43″W
- Country: United States
- State: Louisiana
- Parish: Acadia
- Elevation: 46 ft (14 m)
- Time zone: UTC-6 (CST)
  - Summer (DST): UTC-5 (CDT)
- Area code: 337

Mowata is a small farming unincorporated community in Acadia Parish, Louisiana, United States, located between Crowley and Eunice along LA Hwy 13. The community is part of the Crowley Micropolitan Statistical Area. The community includes the St. Lawrence Catholic church with a baseball park on the grounds. A small grocery store near the church is called "The Mowata Store" and is a popular place to buy boudin.
