= Keck, Mahin & Cate =

Keck, Mahin & Cate was a law firm based in Chicago, Illinois that was founded in 1886 and stopped operations in 1997.

The firm worked in general practice, banking and bankruptcy law, corporate finances, mergers and acquisitions, and the like. By 1985, it employed 95 lawyers.

The firm had branches in nine other cities, including San Francisco, Houston, New York, and Washington, D.C. In the early 1990s, former Democratic vice-presidential nominee Geraldine Ferraro was a managing partner of its New York office. During the 1980s, Victoria Reggie worked at and became a partner in its Washington office. Former Governor of Texas Mark White worked in its Houston location after he left office in 1987.

By the mid-1990s, Keck, Mahin & Cate had grown rapidly to have some 350 lawyers and faced financial difficulties. In 1994, it was found guilty of having conspired to defraud investors in a Texas jail construction project and was liable for a share of a $36 million judgment. By early 1996, the firm faced being cut off from a $10 million line of credit from its chief lender, Northern Trust Company.

By summer 1997, the firm had lost more than 90 attorneys in four years, and key defections to Chicago rival Rudnick & Wolfe and Chapman and Cutler LLP occurred. The firm considered halting its operations, and vacated its Chicago Loop offices on Wacker Drive.

Keck, Mahin & Cate effectively ended later in 1997, as in December 1997 several creditors filed an involuntary Chapter 7 bankruptcy action against it. By the end of the month, this was converted to a Chapter 11 bankruptcy. It remained there for a number of years. In 2002, the bankruptcy court ruled that some former partners could not escape liability for the firm's debts. That year Bracewell & Patterson successfully defended Keck remnants against a legal malpractice claim dating back to 1992.
