= Church Point, Louisiana =

- Town
- Town of Church Point
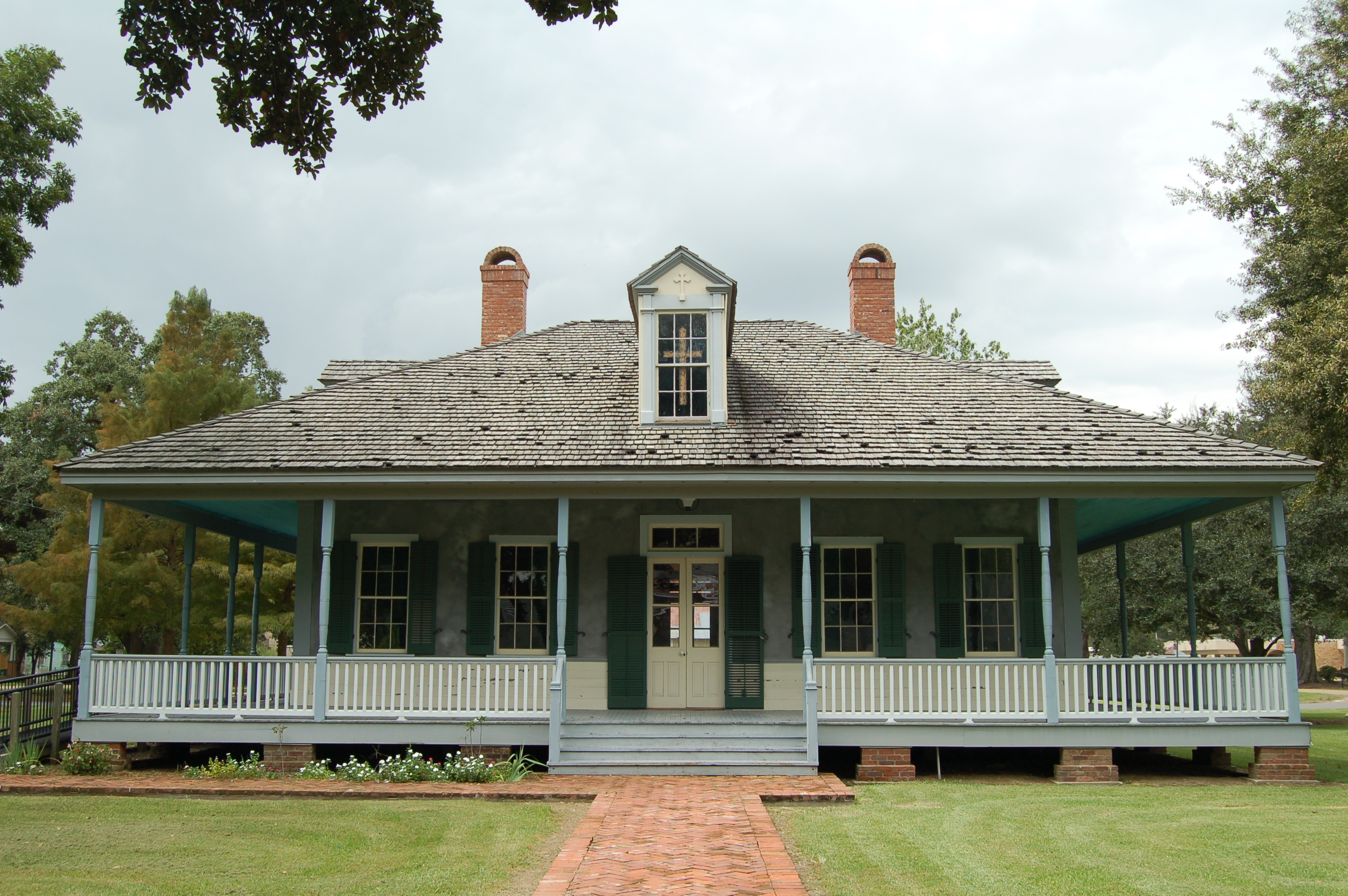
- Le Vieux Presbytere in Church Point
- Motto: "Buggy Capital U.S.A."
- Location of Church Point in Acadia Parish, Louisiana.

- Location of Louisiana in the United States
- Coordinates: 30°24′13″N 92°12′52″W
- Country: United States
- State: Louisiana
- Parish: Acadia

Government
  - Type: Town Hall

Area
  - Total: 2.90 sq mi (7.50 km^{2})
  - Land: 2.90 sq mi (7.50 km^{2})
  - Water: 0 sq mi (0.00 km^{2})
- Elevation: 46 ft (14 m)

Population (2020)
  - Total: 4,179
  - Density: 1,443.8/sq mi (557.46/km^{2})
- Time zone: UTC-6 (CST)
  - Summer (DST): UTC-5 (CDT)
- ZIP code: 70525
- Area code: 337
- FIPS code: 22-15465
- GNIS feature ID: 2406269
- Website: www.churchpoint.org

Church Point (French: Pointe-à-l'Église) is a town in Acadia Parish, Louisiana, United States. As of the 2020 census, Church Point had a population of 4,179. It is part of the Crowley Micropolitan Statistical Area. Church Point is known as the Buggy Capital of the World as it used to be host to the annual Buggy Festival which has since gone defunct.

== History ==
In the late 18th century, French settlers from Nova Scotia (Acadie) Canada, created clearings by burning the underbrush, leaving what they called a brûlé, or "burn", much as the Native Americans in the area had created a "burn" to promote new grass to attract bison and other grazing and browsing animals.

One of these clearings was created on a slough off Bayou Mermentau, near where the slough came to a point. This new clearing became known as Plaquemine Brûlé in 1843 when Etienne d'Aigle III, a descendant of immigrants from Quebec, became the first settler in the area, which at that time was in the middle of Opelousas Parish (later St. Landry Parish), which stretched from the Atchafalaya River to the Sabine River.

Plaquemine is an Atakapa word for the native Louisiana persimmon. The French term Plaquemine Brûlé is translated into English as "Burnt Persimmon"—a result of the burning of the brush and other woody growth, which apparently contained persimmon trees, during the widening of a slough off Bayou Mermentau to accommodate barge travel for local farmers.

As more families were attracted to the area, Jesuit missionaries fulfilled their spiritual needs by establishing a chapel in 1848 on land donated by the d'Aigle brothers Etienne (III) and Joseph ("José"). The church was known as La Chapelle de la pointe de Plaquemine Brûlé (in English, "The Church at the point of Burnt Persimmon"). The English term was later shortened to "Church Point" to refer to the spire on top of the church which could be seen, and traversed to, for miles in this frontier area, and translated back into French as La Pointe de l'Eglise.

"Plaquemine Brûlé was considered part of the frontier for the next several decades, as there were no railroads and the swampy terrain made overland travel difficult. Early pioneers to the area requested land grants along the bayou only large enough to satisfy their families' immediate needs. Many families raised cattle, which roamed freely on the open range of the prairie."

The town's first school was established in 1856, providing encouragement for the community to grow further. The first post office for the town of "Church Point" was established in the area on September 29, 1873, marking the settlement's first official recognition as a community; Jules Gilbert David (1840-1892) was the town's first postmaster. Thirteen years later, residents of the town voted with those of surrounding communities to form a new parish known as Acadia.

== Geography ==
According to the United States Census Bureau, the town has a total area of 2.9 square miles (7.5 km^{2}), all land.

== Demographics ==
Historical population
Census	Pop.	Note	%±
1900	278		—
1910	481		73.0%
1920	557		15.8%
1930	1,037		86.2%
1940	1,892		82.4%
1950	2,897		53.1%
1960	3,606		24.5%
1970	3,865		7.2%
1980	4,599		19.0%
1990	4,677		1.7%
2000	4,756		1.7%
2010	4,560		−4.1%
2020	4,179		−8.4%
2025 (est.)	4,036	▼	−3.4%
U.S. Decennial Census

Church Point racial composition as of 2020
Race	Number	Percentage
White (non-Hispanic)	2,308	55.23%
Black or African American (non-Hispanic)	1,533	36.68%
Native American	4	0.1%
Asian	6	0.14%
Other/Mixed	162	3.88%
Hispanic or Latino	166	3.97%

As of the 2020 United States census, there were 4,179 people, 1,823 households, and 1,064 families residing in the town.

== Economy ==
As Interstate 10 and Interstate 49 are less than 15 miles (24 km) from town, many of the people who live in Church Point work in larger surrounding communities. Many of those who work in the area are farmers, growing rice, soybeans, corn, milo, sugarcane or crawfish.

Church Point is home to Church Point Wholesale, a grocery distributor that transports goods in the southern United States. Also, Richard’s Cajun Foods, who has called Church Point its home since 1981, creates a variety of smoked meats and pre-packaged Cajun meat mixes that is in stores around the United States. Since 2021, Cajun Family Traditions, owned by the original Richard’s Cajun Foods owners, also has ties to the Cajun meat industry and delivers their foods regionally at this time.

== Arts and culture ==
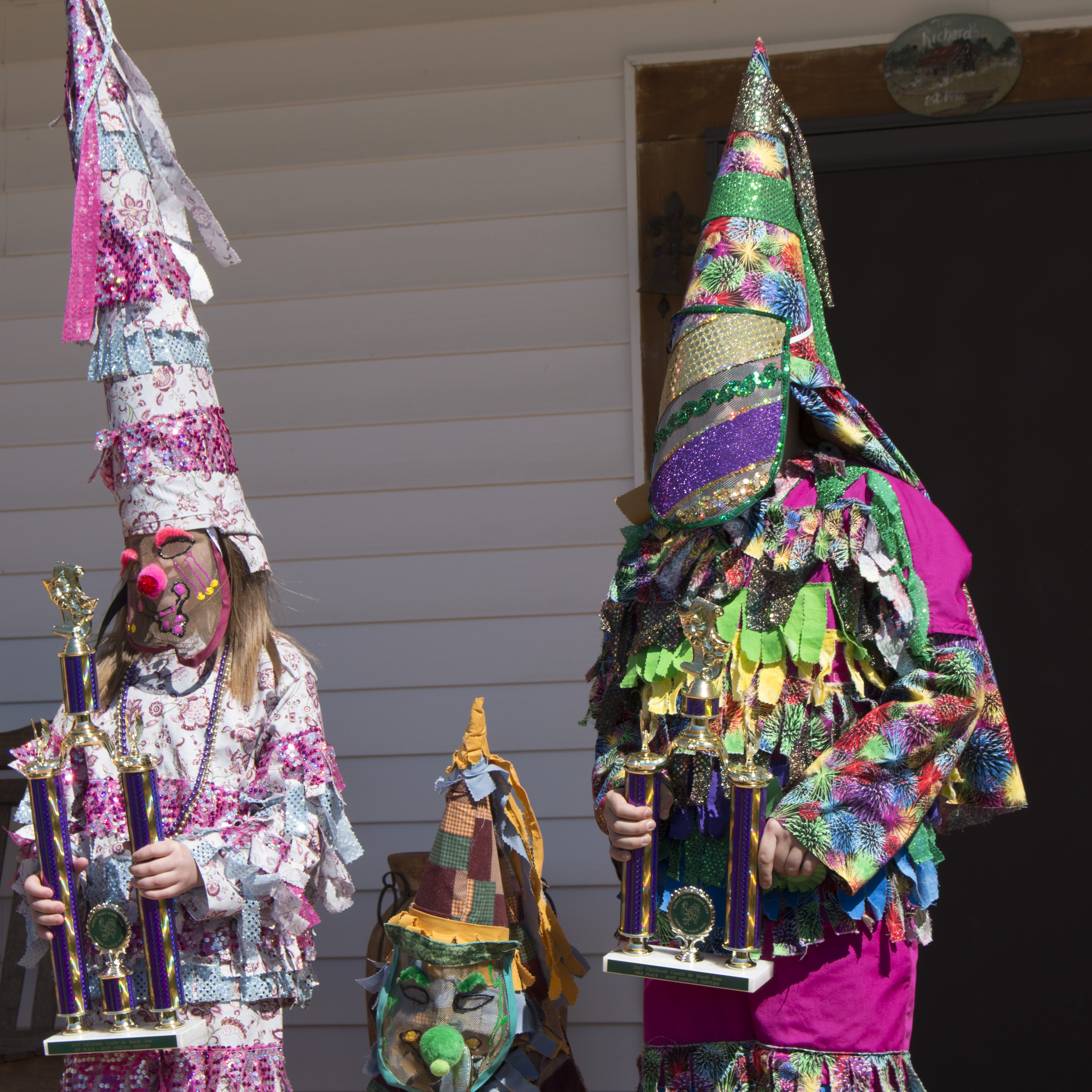
Award for "Most Original Costume" is given at the 2017 Children's Courir de Mardi Gras

Since 1981, the Acadia St. Landry Medical Foundation, which supports the Acadia St. Landry Hospital, has organized an annual Buggy Festival held in Church Point on the first weekend in June. The town was chosen because residents had used buggies as their main means of transportation until the early 1950s, earning Church Point the nickname "Buggy Capital of the world" in 1927. In its first 25 years, the festival earned over $440,000 in profits, which were distributed among the hospital, the parks department of the city of Church Point, and various civic organizations. Two scholarships are also awarded annually. The festival, which includes a Sunday parade, gives visitors the opportunity to explore various horse-drawn vehicles. Cajun musicians perform throughout the weekend, while Cajun cuisine is featured. The festival also often includes a French speaking contest and a Cajun French accordion contest. Each year the town holds a Courir de Mardi Gras.

In 1987 Church Point established a relationship with Church Point, Nova Scotia, bringing about a revival of interest in its French culture. The town now proudly calls itself the "Cajun Music Capital of the World", based on "having the greatest number of professional Cajun musicians of any place on earth". A different Cajun musician is honored each year on Cajun Day, the second Sunday in November.

Iry LeJeune born in Church Point, October 28, 1929. One of the most popular Cajun musicians in the mid to late 1940s into the early 1950s.

Boozoo Chavis born in Church Point, October 23, 1930. Accordion player, singer, songwriter and bandleader. Boozoo Chavis was one of the pioneers of zydeco music.

Rosie Ledet born Mary Roszela Bellard, in Church Point, October 25, 1971. An American Creole, Zydeco Accordion player and singer. She is currently playing with her band, the Zydeco Playboys.

== Government ==
Church Point is organized under the Louisiana Lawrason Act and is governed by an elected mayor and five members of the Board of Aldermen. These officials are responsible for implementing and carrying out laws for the advancement of interest, welfare, health, comfort, safety, and convenience of the community and its citizens. Elections are held every four years, with candidates taking office on the first day of July following the election and remaining in power for the next four years.
The current mayor of Church Point is:

- Ryan "Spanky" Meche (R), a local businessowner and entrepreneur

Aldermen include:

- Gene Malbrough (D) – District 1
- Joy Daigle (R) – District 2
- Patrick "Pat" O'Pry (I) – District 3
- Dale Wimberley (R) – District 4
- Jerome Landry – District 5 (interim)

== Education ==
Public

- Church Point High School (9–12)
- Church Point Middle School (6–8)
- Church Point Elementary (PK–5)

Private

- Our Mother of Peace Elementary (PK4–8)

== Athletics ==
The town of Church Point has one high school, which fields these sports:

Church Point High School

- Men's Football (Varsity, Junior Varsity, and Freshman)
- Men's Baseball (Varsity)
- Men's Basketball (Varsity)
- Men's Wrestling (Varsity)
- Men's Powerlifting (Varsity)
- Women's Softball (Varsity)
- Women's Basketball (Varsity)
- Women's Volleyball (Varsity, Junior Varsity)
- Men's and Women's Track and Field

(Not including club sports)

NFL Wide Receiver Mark Carrier was born in Church Point, October 28, 1965. Mark was selected by the Tampa Bay Buccaneers the third round of the 1987 NFL Draft, 57th overall. He was a 3-sport athlete at Church Point High School, playing football, basketball and track. Carrier went on to play college football at Nicholls State University.

Louisiana Ragin' Cajuns baseball assistant head coach and former Nicholls Colonels baseball head coach Seth Thibodeaux is originally from Church Point. He was the head coach at Nicholls from 2011 until 2021 and began his tenure at Louisiana in 2022. He has an overall career record of 229–220–1 and has reached the Southland Conference baseball tournament four times in his head coaching job.

The Town of Church Point also hosts recreational softball and baseball during the spring time as well as FNA, Football N' America, a youth flag football league created by Drew Brees during the summer and fall. Church Point's FNA is one of the first leagues to be played in a small town.
