= Cornelius C. Duson =

American law enforcement officer

Cornelius C. "Curley" Duson (August 31, 1846 - October 19, 1910) was a Louisiana lawman. He was the sheriff of St. Landry Parish, Louisiana from 1874 to 1888. During his career, he was known for his dogged determination.

== Famous exploits ==
In one case, he single-handedly chased two fugitives from Opelousas to the Red River. There he killed one of them in a hand-to-hand fight. He wounded the other man and brought him back to Opelousas to face justice.

His most famous case was his capture of Louis Rousseau. Rousseau had fled the state after allegedly committing a murder in the town of Ville Platte. Duson tracked Rousseau for months, and found him in the Indian Territory of Oklahoma. Louis Rousseau was captured and brought to trial. Louis Rousseau was hanged on June 8, 1877, in what was the first execution of a white man in St. Landry parish in 30 years.

In another well known case, a John Sonnier eluded capture for nine years after being indicted on two counts of murder in 1871. Several years after his indictment, Sonnier returned to St. Landry Parish. He narrowly escaped Sheriff Duson and disappeared. After some determined questioning, Duson located Sonnier in Brazoria County, Texas, where he was working as a prison guard. Sheriff Duson enlisted the help of two Texas officers to capture Sonnier. John Sonnier was captured and sentenced to life in prison.

== History ==
C.C. Duson was the son of Cornelius Duson McNaughton, an Irish Scotch Canadian infamous for rebelling against the English in Canada. At age 21, he started work as a deputy sheriff in 1867, under Sheriff James G. Hayes. Hayes and Duson had been friends since the Civil War when they met as POWs in a POW camp in Washington, Louisiana. James Hayes was assassinated, and the job of sheriff went to his younger brother Egbert Hayes. As sheriff, Egbert appointed Curley as his executive assistant. Curley Duson held this job until 1872, when he campaigned for the office of sheriff in 1872. During his career Duson was known as a crack shot with a pistol. In 1882, an Opelousas newspaper reported that Sheriff Duson has killed 96 alligators with 96 shots from a boat near Morgan City, Louisiana. The same article mentioned "Duson got his man in Texas, for murder north of Chicot." The wording and placement of the news implied that his capture of the wanted man was commonplace.

In 1906, Curley Duson was appointed to the position of U.S. marshal for the Western District of Louisiana by President Theodore Roosevelt.

Among Curley Duson's accomplishments, he was instrumental in founding three towns in SW Louisiana; Eunice, Crowley and Mamou. He also helped found Acadia Parish in 1886.
