= Midland High School (Louisiana) =

Public school in Louisiana, United States

Location
- 735 South Crockett Street; Midland, (Acadia Parish), Louisiana 70559; United States; 30.16778°N 92.49739°W

Information
- Type: Public high school
- School district: Acadia Parish School Board
- Principal: Sherri Lacoste
- Staff: 24.29 (FTE)
- Enrollment: 310 (2023-2024)
- Student to teacher ratio: 12.76
- Colors: Red and gray
- Mascot: Rebel
- Nickname: Rebels
- Website: mhs.acadia.k12.la.us

Midland High School is a rural high school in Midland, an unincorporated area in Acadia Parish, Louisiana, United States. It is administered by the Acadia Parish School Board.

In 2005 it had 330 students, and 20 teachers. 4% of the students were African American, and the remainder white.

== School uniforms ==
Beginning in the 1999–2000 school year the school district required all students to wear school uniforms.

== Athletics ==
Midland High athletics competes in the LHSAA.

== See also ==
- List of high schools in Louisiana
