= Victor Trahan =

American architect

- Born: Victor F. Trahan III; Crowley, Louisiana, US
- Other name: Trey Trahan
- Education: Louisiana State University
- Occupation: Architect
- Practice: Trahan Architects
- Projects: Louisiana Sports Hall of Fame Coca-Cola Stage at the Alliance Theatre Caesars Superdome
- Website: trahanarchitects.com

Victor F. "Trey" Trahan III FAIA is an American architect and Fellow of the American Institute of Architects. Trahan is the founder and CEO of Trahan Architects, a New Orleans–based architecture firm, founded in 1992, with an additional studio in New York City.

In 2019, Trahan Architects was ranked the No. 1 design firm in the U.S. for 2019, by Architect 50, a national ranking of architecture firms published by Architect Magazine, the official magazine of the AIA.

Trahan’s best-known works are The Coca-Cola Stage at The Alliance Theatre located within the Woodruff Arts Center (Atlanta, Georgia) which won the 2021 Interior Architecture Award from the American Institute of Architects (AIA. The Caesars Superdome (formerly the Mercedes-Benz Superdome) New Orleans, Louisiana, The Louisiana State Museum and Sports Hall of Fame (Natchitoches, Louisiana) and Magnolia Mound Turner Family Visitor’s Center (Baton Rouge, Louisiana).

== Early life ==
Trahan grew up on a rice farm near Crowley Louisiana.

He earned his architecture degree from Louisiana State University in 1983.

== Career ==
In 1992, Trahan formed Trahan Architects. From 2015 to 2017, Trahan served as a member of the International Council of the Van Alen Institute in New York.

=== Caesars Superdome ===
Following Hurricane Katrina, Trahan was selected as the lead architect for the renovation of the two-million square feet Mercedes-Benz Superdome. The project, funded in part by FEMA, was completed in less than a year, receiving engineering awards for its custom solutions.

Trahan Architects was also chosen as the lead architectural behind the $450 million renovation of the Caesars Superdome (formerly known as the Mercedes-Benz Superdome) in New Orleans. 'Phase 1' plans were approved by the Louisiana Stadium and Exposition District (commonly known as the Superdome Commission) in late 2019, and work began January 2020. The firm is currently engaged in ‘Phase 3’ of this multi-phase interior renovation of this building which consists of the interior renovation of approximately 89,300 square feet of the 1,989,807 gross square footage of occupiable floor space. "Across five years leading up to Super Bowl LIX in February 2025, an expansive interior overhaul will be carried out to enhance the quality of game spectatorship, food service and hospitality services and the overall patron experience."

=== Coca Cola Stage at the Alliance Theatre ===
The Coca Cola Stage at the Alliance Theatre was completed in 2019 and is located in Atlanta, Georgia. This was the first major project at the theatre since 1968 when it was built. Trahan Architects focused on patron experience, technology, and infrastructure in the redesign. This project was part of the Phase 1 of the Woodruff Arts Center; the entire project had a $100 million budget. The stage was completed at $300 per square foot.

The balcony and orchestra are united, eliminating historic notions of segregation of the expensive and "cheap2 seats. A cascading set of terraces connects the audience in the balcony to the spectators at orchestra level and the performers on stage. New staircases and terraces improve circulation and allow greater access for people with disabilities.

Isolated entrances were eliminated that previously were dedicated to specific seating zones, recognizing that the experience of taking a seat inherently divides socio-economic communities. The new circulation network puts all patrons on a shared path to their seat regardless of ticket value—ensuring that people seated in the boxed terraces won’t have a higher quality experience relative to those in the balcony. By using an innovative network of sloping ramps, all seats can be accessed by elderly patrons and those with disabilities. Wheelchair lifts are eliminated, and ramps were installed so that everyone has the same circulatory routes. Wheelchair seating is located at each seating level including the center of the lower orchestra. The perimeter ramp establishes a communal path. The design exceeded ADA seating by 25 percent.

=== Louisiana State Museum and Sports Hall of Fame ===
The Louisiana State Museum and Sports Hall of Fame in Natchitoches, Louisiana, completed in 2013, has received the National AIA Honor Award for Interior Architecture (2015), International Architecture Awards from the Chicago Athenaeum (2014), the "2013 Annual Design Review Honor" by Architect Magazine, the "2013 Best of the Year Award for Civic" by Interior Design magazine, and the "2013 Architecture Project of the Year" by Azure magazine.

The project has sports and Louisiana history collections. It is located in a historic area of Louisiana dating back to the Louisiana Purchase. The state paid $12.6 million to have the museum built and is 2800 cubic meters.

== Awards and honors ==
- 2021: Laureate of the American Prize for Architecture by both the Chicago Athenaeum: Museum of Architecture and Design and The European Centre for Architecture Art Design and Urban Studies.
- 2015: AIA Institute Honor Awards for Interior Architecture for Louisiana State Museum
- 2013: Best of the Year Winner: Civic, Interior Design for Louisiana Sports Hall of Fame & Northwest Louisiana History Museum
