= International Rice Festival =

Festival in Crowley, Louisiana

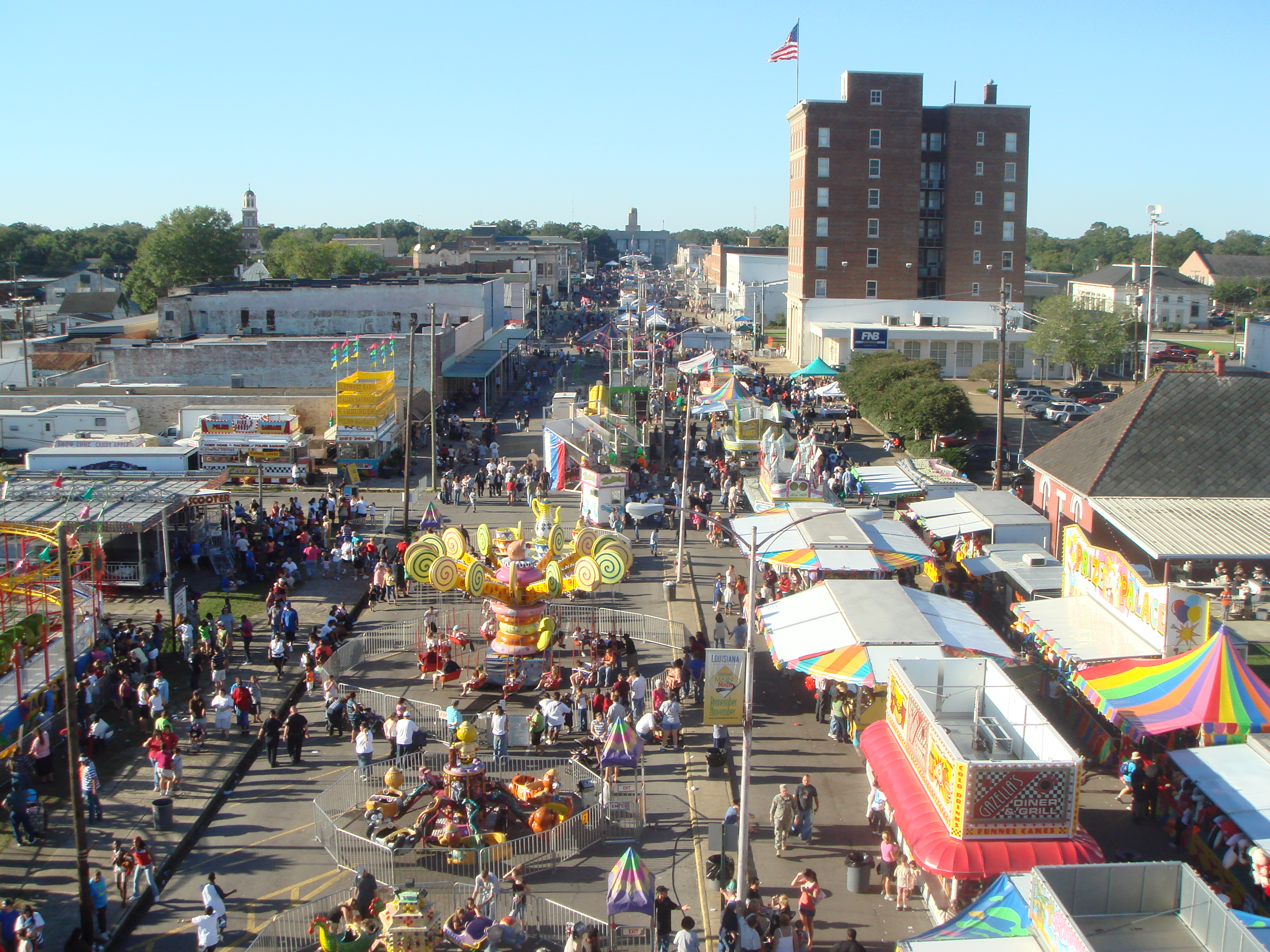
Crowley's Main Street in the International Rice Festival, 2007

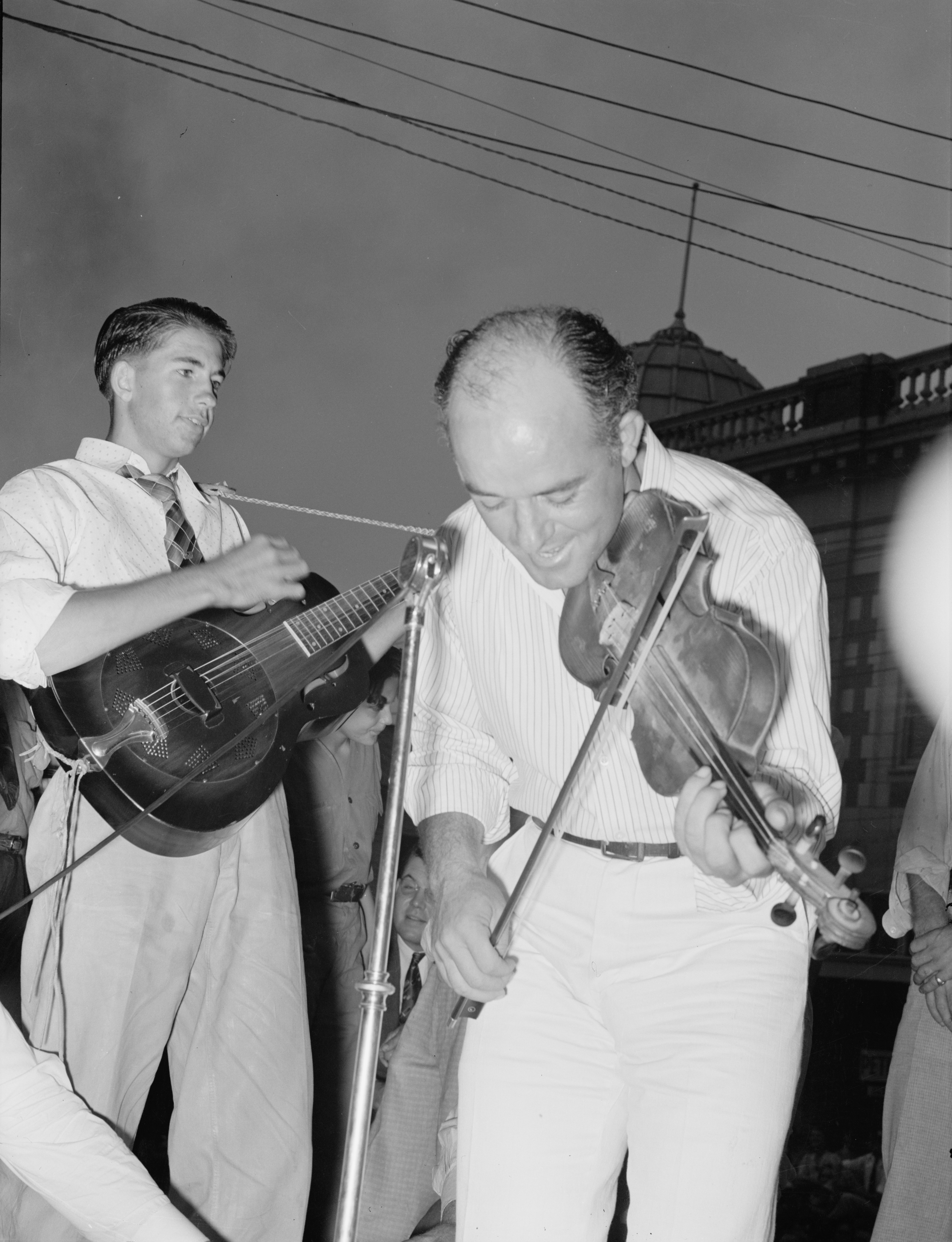
Cajun fiddler at 1938 National Rice Festival, photographed by Russell Lee.

The International Rice Festival is an annual festival held during the third weekend in October in Crowley, Louisiana, celebrating rice. The event is Louisiana's oldest agricultural festival, and one of the state's largest. The first festival was held on October 5, 1937, as the National Rice Festival; it was renamed the "International Rice Festival" in 1946 when the festival was resumed after a hiatus during World War II (1942–1945). Since the Festival's beginnings, over seven million people have attended the annual event.

There are two parades. The second is on Saturday and is the Grand Parade. There is a rice cooking contest where contestants compete for the title of Chef de Riz, rice eating contest, farmers' banquet and the Queens' Ball. There is also entertainment continuously from early morning to midnight and an arts and crafts exhibit, which is held adjacent to the festival grounds and also on Main Street.

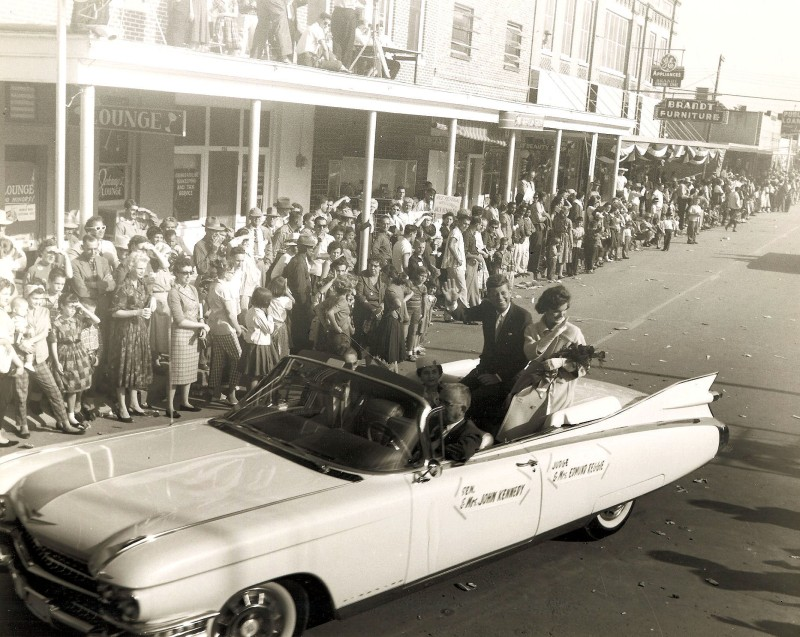
John F. Kennedy and Jacqueline visiting in 1959, while seated in a Cadillac Eldorado Biarritz convertible

This festival went on hiatus in 2020 due to the COVID-19 pandemic and returned in 2021.
