= Iota High School =

Coordinates: 30.326058°N 92.494682°W

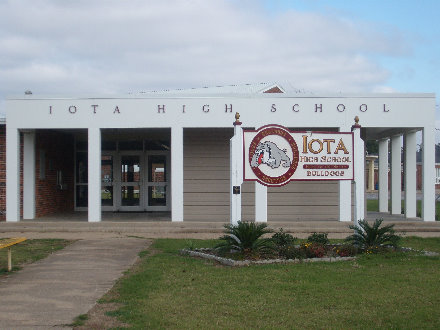

Location
- 456 South 5th Street; Iota, (Acadia Parish), Louisiana 70543; United States

Information
- Type: Public, Coeducational
- Status: Open
- School board: Acadia Parish School Board
- Superintendent: Scott M. Richard
- Principal: Colby Wallace
- Teaching staff: 30.11 (FTE)
- Grades: 9–12
- Student to teacher ratio: 19.30
- Colors: Maroon and Gold
- Athletics conference: LHSAA
- Mascot: American Bulldog
- Nickname: Bulldogs
- Feeder schools: Iota Middle School (Iota); Evangeline Elementary School (Evangeline); Egan Elementary School (Egan)
- Website: ihs.acadia.k12.la.us

Iota High School is a high school located in Iota, Louisiana, United States. The school is a part of the Acadia Parish School Board. Pencil

== School uniforms ==
Beginning in the 1999–2000 school year, the school district required all students to wear school uniforms.

== Athletics ==
Iota High athletics competes in the LHSAA.

Sports sponsored by the school include:

- Men's Football
- Men's Basketball
- Women's Basketball
- Men's Baseball
- Women's Softball
- Men's Powerlifting
- Women's Powerlifting
- Men's Tennis
- Women's Tennis
- Men's Track & Field
- Women's Track & Field
- Women's Volleyball

=== State Championships ===
Football

- (1) 1999

Girls Basketball

- (4) 1981, 1992, 2007, 2008

=== State Runners-Up ===
Baseball

- (1) 2018

Football

- (2) 2001, 2002

Girls Basketball

- (4) 1970, 1994, 2006, 2012
