= Johnny Rebel (musician) =

American singer-songwriter (1938–2016)

- Also known as: Johnny Blaine; Jericho Jones; Pee Wee; Jimmy Krebs; Tommy Todd; Johnny Trahan / Trayhan; Filthy McNasty
- Born: Clifford Joseph Trahan; September 25, 1938; Moss Bluff, Louisiana, U.S.
- Died: September 3, 2016 (aged 77) Rayne, Louisiana, U.S.
- Genres: Country; white power music; swamp pop; folk
- Occupations: Singer; songwriter; musician
- Instruments: Vocals; guitar
- Years active: 1959–2003
- Labels: AggWood; Flyright; Try It Man; Johnny Rebel; Reb Rebel; Todd; Master-Trak; Viking; Wildwood; Zynn

Clifford Joseph Trahan (September 25, 1938 – September 3, 2016), better known by the stage names Johnny Rebel, Pee Wee Trahan, Filthy McNasty, Jericho Jones, and many other pseudonyms, was an American singer-songwriter known for his openly racist songs. Trahon used a number of pseudonyms throughout his career; he used the Johnny Rebel name to voice sympathy for racial segregation, the KKK, and the Confederacy, and frequently used the racial slur "nigger". He used Pee Wee Trahan for more mainstream, family-friendly country music that focused on themes such as love, dancing, and rural life, and Filthy McNasty for sexually explicit lyrics. The Johnny Rebel name, inspired by Johnny Reb, the national personification of the common soldier of the Confederate States Army, was used for J. D. "Jay" Miller's Reb Rebel label in the 1960s in response to the civil rights movement.

After retiring in 2003, Trahan stated that he "just did it for the money" and that he "didn't set out to spread hate or start trouble". He said, "At that time, there was a lot of resentment – whites toward blacks and blacks toward whites. So, everybody had their own feelings. Lots of people changed their feelings over the years. I basically changed my feelings over the years up to a point."

== Early life ==
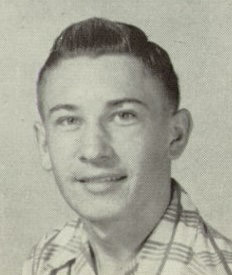
Junior yearbook photo of Trahan, 1955

Clifford Joseph Trahan was born in Moss Bluff, Louisiana, on September 25, 1938, the son of Elizabeth Breaux Taylor and Homer Trahan. Following his parents' divorce, he moved with his mother to Crowley, Louisiana, where he picked up an interest in music and received his first guitar as a gift at the age of 12. He graduated from Crowley High School in 1956.

== Career ==
Trahan became close with record producer J. D. "Jay" Miller, a cousin of his, and recorded several country songs under the alias of Tommy Todd. Those songs never became commercial successes and Trahan moved to Nashville, Tennessee, to record with newly founded Todd Records. He became close with Murray Nash, a songwriter for country singer George Morgan, and in 1959 recorded four songs (as 'Jericho Jones') with Todd Records, but the label folded in 1964.

Trahan then worked as a shipyard inspector in Mississippi before returning to Louisiana. Miller had founded Reb Rebel Records, which recorded segregationist music, and urged Trahan to record songs with the new label. Trahan obliged, recording under the alias of Johnny Rebel, a name Miller had selected. It was inspired by Johnny Reb, the national personification of the common soldier of the Confederate States Army. Miller produced the sessions and issued the recordings through Reb Rebel. Under that name, Trahan voiced sympathy for racial segregation, the KKK, and the Confederacy, and frequently used the racial slur "nigger".

Trahan's first release—the fifth for the Reb Rebel label—was a 45 RPM single of "Lookin' for a Handout" and "Kajun Ku Klux Klan". He then recorded more singles for the label: "Nigger, Nigger", "In Coon Town", "Who Likes a Nigger?", "Nigger Hatin' Me", "Still Looking for a Handout", "Some Niggers Never Die (They Just Smell That Way)", "Stay Away from Dixie", and "Move Them Niggers North".

Few of Trahan's songs as Johnny Rebel concern topics other than race. These exceptions include "Keep a-Workin' Big Jim", about the efforts of Louisiana district attorney Jim Garrison to solve the assassination of John F. Kennedy, and "(Federal Aid Hell!) The Money Belongs to Us", a song critical of U.S. federal aid programs. Two of these songs were eventually issued in album format by Reb Rebel Records under the title For Segregationists Only. Under other pseudonyms, he focused on different material. He used Pee Wee Trahan for more mainstream, family-friendly country music that focused on themes such as love, dancing, and rural life, and Filthy McNasty for sexually explicit lyrics.

Johnny Rebel's songs found some popularity in some Southern juke joints, but never received radio airplay, and in time Trahan largely forgot about the venture. Because of bootlegged records and Internet interest, Johnny Rebel's career continued; in the late 1990s he was rediscovered, and he re-released his music on CD and promoted it with his own website. With the emergence of the Internet, Johnny Rebel gained newfound fame, and Trahan hired fan Brad Herman as his new manager in 2001. He then recorded and released a new song titled "Infidel Anthem", describing the "whipping" America should lay on Osama bin Laden following the September 11 attacks. Herman booked him on The Howard Stern Show, where he promoted the song and his new compilation CD. This led to increased interest in his music. Trahan eventually cut ties with Herman, but released two records in 2003.

Johnny Rebel is often misidentified as the pseudonym of country singer David Allan Coe, who achieved popularity during the 1970s and 1980s. The confusion stems in part from the song "Nigger Fucker", which appears on Coe's Underground Album.

== Later comments and views ==
In a 2003 interview, Trahan claimed that he "[just made the music] for the money" and that he "didn't set out to spread hate or start trouble". He said, "At that time, there was a lot of resentment – whites toward blacks and blacks toward whites. So, everybody had their own feelings. Lots of people changed their feelings over the years. I basically changed my feelings over the years up to a point." However, he did have an issue with reparations for slavery and said, "Blacks develop an attitude towards the whites, and they won't let it go. They won't let go of what happened. Why should we pay reparations for things that happened 200 years ago? I was run out of my country. [...] My ancestors were run out of Nova Scotia."

== Death ==
Trahan died in Rayne, Louisiana, on September 3, 2016, at the age of 77. He is buried in Woodlawn Cemetery in nearby Crowley.

== Legacy ==
An Anti-Defamation League report noted that "since the 1960s, when racist country singer Johnny Rebel recorded songs such as 'N-- Hatin' Me,' [sic] more than 500 hate rock bands have formed worldwide".

Johnny Rebel's songs have been covered by other singers such as Big Reb and the German neo-Nazi band Landser, which covered his "Coon Town" under the title "Kreuzberg" in 1997 (in the cover, the song's "target" was shifted from African-Americans towards German Turks and punks).

In 2003, the website of white supremacist record label Resistance Records listed Johnny Rebel's Klassic Klan Kompositions album as its No. 2 seller, second only to their video game Ethnic Cleansing.

== Discography ==
=== Studio albums ===
Year	Album details
1971	For Segregationists Only: Release date: 1971; Label: Reb Rebel Records
2003	The Complete Johnny Rebel Collection: Release date: 2003; Label: Johnny Rebel Records
2003	It's the Attitude, Stupid!: Release date: 2003; 2006; Label: Try It Man Records; Johnny Rebel Records

=== Singles ===
Year	Title	Album
1966	"Kajun Ku Klux Klan / Lookin' for a Handout" (Reb Rebel 504)	For Segregationists Only (Sunwheel SWCD001, 1994)
1966	"Nigger Hatin' Me / Who Likes a Nigger" (Reb Rebel 508)	For Segregationists Only (Sunwheel SWCD001, 1994)
1967	"(Federal Aid Hell!) The Money Belongs to Us / Keep a Workin' Big Jim" (Reb Rebel 511)	
1968	"Nigger, Nigger / Move Them Niggers North" (Reb Rebel 514)	
1969	"Still Looking for a Handout / In Coon Town" (Reb Rebel 515)	
1970	"Some Niggers Never Die / Stay Away from Dixie" (Reb Rebel 518)	
