= Bill Cleveland =

American politician (1902–1974)

William Jennings Cleveland, Sr.

Louisiana State Representative for Acadia Parish
- In office 1944–1956
- Preceded by: Angelos Chaisson; N. C. Petitjean
- Succeeded by: E. C. Frémaux; Bernard Regan

Louisiana State Senator for Acadia Parish and in first term St. Landry Parish too
- In office 1956–1964
- Preceded by: Edward M. Boagni, Jr. Guy C. Gardiner
- Succeeded by: Edwin Edwards

Personal details
- Born: October 19, 1902 Lena Station, Rapides Parish, Louisiana, US
- Died: December 16, 1974 (aged 72) New Orleans, Louisiana
- Resting place: Woodlawn Cemetery in Crowley, Louisiana
- Party: Democratic
- Spouse(s): (1) Willie Mae Dean Cleveland (divorced) (2) Patricia Williamson Cleveland (died 2010)
- Relations: Pap Dean (nephew by marriage)
- Children: 6
- Occupation: Real estate developer

William Jennings Cleveland, Sr. (October 19, 1902 – December 16, 1974), served in both houses of the Louisiana State Legislature from 1944 to 1964. He was also acting governor for one day in 1959.

Political offices
Preceded by Angelos Chaisson; N. C. Petitjean	Louisiana State Representative for Acadia Parish; William Jennings "Bill" Cleveland, Sr. (alongside Angelos Chaisson, C. E. Whipp, and E. C. Frémaux); 1944 – 1956	Succeeded by E. C. Frémaux; Bernard Regan
Preceded by Edward M. Boagni, Jr. Guy C. Gardiner	Louisiana State Senator for Acadia Parish and St. Landry Parish in first term William Jennings "Bill" Cleveland, Sr. (alongside Henry D. Larcade, Jr., in first term); 1956 – 1964	Succeeded by Edwin Edwards
