= Denis Reggie =

American photographer

Denis Reggie is an American photographer who popularized the genre of wedding photojournalism.

== Life and career ==
Denis Reggie was born into a prominent family of Lebanese descent in Crowley, Louisiana. His father, Edmund Reggie, was a local judge and banker, and his mother, Doris Ann Boustany, was a Democratic National committeewoman. His mother's family was wealthy from a Louisiana bakery business.

At the 1956 Democratic National Convention, Edmund Reggie helped deliver his state's delegates for the vice-presidential nomination to Senator John F. Kennedy, which sparked a lifelong alliance with the Kennedy family, to whom he was a close advisor. Kennedy visited the Reggies in Crowley in 1959. Years later, Doris Ann Boustany would cast the only Louisiana delegate vote for Ted Kennedy at the 1980 Democratic National Convention.

Denis Reggie attended Tulane University, where he took photographs for the yearbook and local newspapers.

Reggie became a full-time wedding photographer, specializing in society weddings. He started photographing Kennedy family weddings in 1980 when Ethel Kennedy hired him to photograph her daughter Courtney Kennedy Hill's wedding." A 1987 profile in The New York Times said that he "might be the hottest photographer of the moment." In 1996 he took the photograph of John Kennedy Jr. kissing the hand of Carolyn Bessette that was described by The Wall Street Journal as the watershed image that transformed wedding photography forever.

Reggie is based in Atlanta and travels to photograph a wedding nearly every weekend.

In April 2011 Reggie told The Wall Street Journal he had photographed 1,900 weddings. He has produced instruction material and video tutorials for camera and photographic manufacturers, Canon, and PocketWizard.

In addition to more than 21 Kennedy weddings, Reggie's clients have included Oprah Winfrey, Vera Wang, Mariah Carey, James Taylor, Don Henley, Chris O'Donnell, Noah Wyle, Alan Greenspan and Andrea Mitchell, Dominick Dunne, Tom Clancy, Karenna Gore, Carey Lowell, Ted Turner, Peter Jennings, Bob Schieffer, Mary Matalin and James Carville, Holly Hunter, John Kerry, Paula Abdul, Fran Tarkenton, Susan Lucci, Emilio Estevez, Maria Shriver and Arnold Schwarzenegger, Kenneth Cole, Mario Cuomo, and Rudolph Giuliani.

Reggie has appeared on Entertainment Tonight, The Oprah Winfrey Show, and the Today show. A series of his photos is now part of the permanent collection of the National Museum of American History of the Smithsonian Institution.
