= Midland, Louisiana =

Midland
- Census-designated place
- Location of Midland in Louisiana
- Coordinates: 30°10′51″N 92°30′10″W
- Country: United States
- State: Louisiana
- Parish: Acadia
- Elevation: 16 ft (4.9 m)

Population (2020)
  - Total: 249
- Time zone: UTC-6 (CST)
  - Summer (DST): UTC-5 (CDT)
- Area code: 337

Midland (French: Moyen-Terre) is a farming unincorporated community and census-designated place in Acadia Parish, Louisiana, United States. It was first listed as a CDP in the 2020 census with a population of 249.

It is located at the intersection of U.S. Highway 90 and Louisiana Highway 91. It is also located at the intersection of the former Louisiana Western Railroad (later a Southern Pacific Transportation Company subsidiary and now a joint BNSF Railway/Union Pacific Railroad line) and its branches to Eunice and Gueydan.

The community is part of the Crowley Micropolitan Statistical Area.

== History ==
Some people say it was given its name because it was the halfway point on the old railroad running westward from New Orleans to Houston. Midland first appeared on an Acadia Parish map as Midland Junction.

During the 1870s, Frank Quebodeaux operated a horse-and-buggy ferry over Bayou Plaquemine Brûlée built of cypress logs and was hauled across the bayou by ropes.

In 1896, the railroad was extended from Midland to Gueydan, Louisiana and then from Gueydan to Abbeville, Louisiana in 1902. Southern Pacific began plans to put a railroad roundhouse at Midland due to Charles H. Cowen, one of the area's most successful rice farmers, developing the town. Cowen was an Illinois native who bought 160 acres (0.65 km^{2}) of land in the Midland area in 1892, and bought another 600 acres (2.4 km^{2}) shortly after that. In 1902, he formed the Midland Development Co. and the Midland Rice Milling Co.. and on April 22 of that year, sold 156 town lots at auction. After Cowen lost a leg in a rice threshing accident and died soon after, Southern Pacific withdrew plans to place a roundhouse in Midland.

Midland's first post office was opened on June 13, 1902, in the Callahan general store, with Eugene T. Callahan as postmaster. The first school at Midland was established in 1903.

== Demographics ==
Historical population
| Census | Pop. | Note | %± |
|---|---|---|---|
| 2020 | 249 | | — |
U.S. Decennial Census; 2020

Midland first appeared as a census designated place in the 2020 U.S. census.

=== 2020 census ===
Midland CDP, Louisiana – Racial and ethnic composition Note: the US Census treats Hispanic/Latino as an ethnic category. This table excludes Latinos from the racial categories and assigns them to a separate category. Hispanics/Latinos may be of any race.
| Race / Ethnicity (NH = Non-Hispanic) | Pop 2020 | % 2020 |
|---|---|---|
| White alone (NH) | 234 | 93.98% |
| Black or African American alone (NH) | 2 | 0.80% |
| Native American or Alaska Native alone (NH) | 1 | 0.40% |
| Asian alone (NH) | 0 | 0.00% |
| Pacific Islander alone (NH) | 0 | 0.00% |
| Other race alone (NH) | 0 | 0.00% |
| Mixed race or Multiracial (NH) | 5 | 2.01% |
| Hispanic or Latino (any race) | 7 | 2.81% |
| Total | 249 | 100.00% |

== See also ==
- Midland High School (Louisiana)
