= Orlando Thomas =

American football player (1972–2014)

No. 42, 43
- Position: Safety

Personal information
- Born: October 21, 1972; Crowley, Louisiana, U.S.
- Died: November 9, 2014 (aged 42); Crowley, Louisiana, U.S.
- Listed height: 6 ft 1 in (1.85 m)
- Listed weight: 222 lb (101 kg)

Career information
- High school: Crowley
- College: Louisiana
- NFL draft: 1995: 2nd round, 42nd overall pick

Career history
- Minnesota Vikings (1995–2001)

Awards and highlights
- NFL Interceptions leader (1995); PFWA All-Rookie Team (1995); First-team All-American (1994); Third-team All-American (1993); 2× Big West Defensive Player of the Year (1993, 1994); 2× First-team All-Big West (1993, 1994)

Career NFL statistics
- Tackles: 457
- Interceptions: 22
- Touchdowns: 2
- Stats at Pro Football Reference

Orlando Paul Thomas (October 21, 1972 – November 9, 2014) was an American professional football player who was a defensive back for the Minnesota Vikings of the National Football League (NFL) from 1995 until 2001. He played college football for the Louisiana Ragin' Cajuns.

== Career ==
Thomas stood 6-1 and weighed 225 pounds during his playing career. He was a second-round draft pick out of the University of Southwestern Louisiana (now University of Louisiana at Lafayette) in 1995. In a wild-card game of the 1996 NFL playoffs, Thomas was injured against the Dallas Cowboys. He intercepted a deflected pass, but his knee stuck to the turf at Texas Stadium and he was carted off. He started 87 of 98 games for the Vikings, intercepting 22 passes, including 9 during his rookie season. He retired following the 2001 season.

On June 29, 1997, he was arrested in his hometown of Crowley, Louisiana and charged with inciting a riot and two counts of disturbing the peace. The charges were reduced to one count of disturbing the peace, and Thomas pleaded no contest. He was ordered to pay a $100 fine, pay court costs, and perform 50 hours of community service.

Thomas married his wife Demetra on February 27, 1998, only two months after their first date and five months after first meeting at Cheese Car Wash in north Minneapolis. He has four children, Alexis, Angelle, Orlando Jr., and Alana, Demetra has a child from a previous relationship.

In 1999, Thomas was charged after allegedly assaulting his wife Demetra. He later pleaded no contest to the misdemeanor charge of simple battery.

Thomas revealed in June 2007 that he was suffering from amyotrophic lateral sclerosis (ALS). On October 28, 2009, it was reported on the Minnesota Vikings' website that Thomas had died, but the organization withdrew the report and apologized to Thomas and his family after it proved to be false. Thomas died of complications from ALS on November 9, 2014.

== NFL career statistics ==
Legend
	Led the league
**Bold**	Career high

=== Regular season ===
Year	Team	Games		Tackles					Interceptions					Fumbles			
Year	Team	GP	GS	Cmb	Solo	Ast	Sck	TFL	Int	Yds	TD	Lng	PD	FF	FR	Yds	TD
1995	MIN	**16**	11	51	41	10	0.0	—	**9**	**108**	**1**	**45**	—	1	**4**	19	**1**
1996	MIN	**16**	**16**	**83**	**65**	18	0.0	—	5	57	0	34	—	**2**	1	0	0
1997	MIN	15	13	70	57	13	0.0	—	2	1	0	1	—	1	2	**26**	**1**
1998	MIN	**16**	**16**	69	60	9	0.5	—	2	27	0	27	—	0	0	0	0
1999	MIN	13	12	72	53	**19**	0.0	0	2	32	**1**	27	4	**2**	1	0	0
2000	MIN	9	9	37	30	7	**1.0**	**1**	1	0	0	0	5	0	2	0	0
2001	MIN	13	10	61	45	16	0.0	0	1	0	0	0	**7**	0	0	0	0
Total		98	87	443	351	92	1.5	1	22	225	2	45	16	6	10	45	2

=== Playoffs ===
Year	Team	Games		Tackles					Interceptions					Fumbles			
Year	Team	GP	GS	Cmb	Solo	Ast	Sck	TFL	Int	Yds	TD	Lng	PD	FF	FR	Yds	TD
1996	MIN	1	1	2	2	0	0.0	—	**1**	**4**	0	**4**	0	0	0	0	0
1997	MIN	**2**	0	3	3	0	0.0	—	0	0	0	0	0	0	0	0	0
1998	MIN	**2**	**2**	**4**	**4**	0	0.0	—	0	0	0	0	0	0	0	0	0
2000	MIN	1	1	1	1	0	0.0	0	0	0	0	0	0	0	0	0	0
Total		6	4	10	10	0	0.0	0	1	4	0	4	0	0	0	0	0
