= Rayne High School =

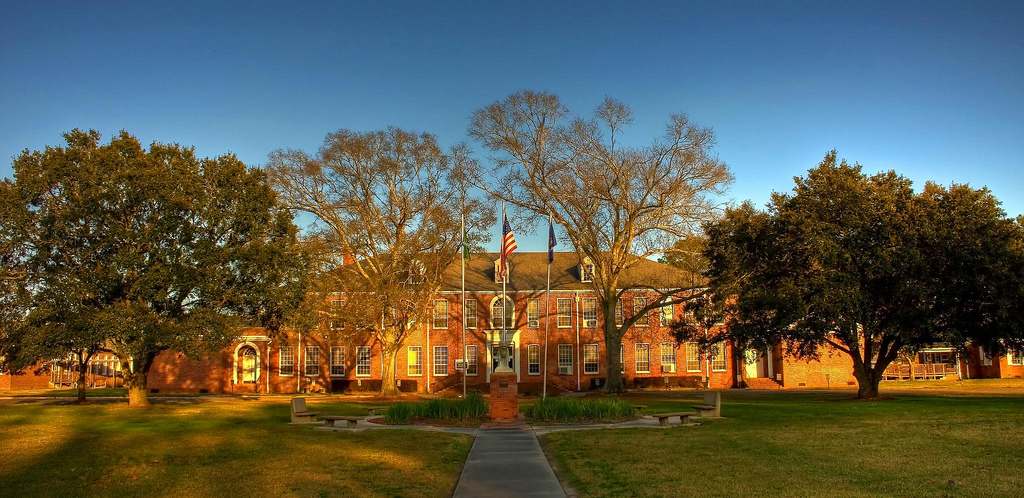

Location
- 1016 North Polk Street; Rayne, (Acadia Parish), Louisiana 70578; United States

Information
- Type: Public, Coeducational
- Motto: A School of Excellence, Transforming Learners into Leaders
- Status: Open
- School board: Acadia Parish School Board
- Superintendent: Scott M. Richard
- Principal: Benny Fontenot
- Teaching staff: 42.76 (FTE)
- Grades: 9–12
- Student to teacher ratio: 15.20
- Colors: Purple and Gold
- Athletics: baseball, basketball, football, golf, powerlifting, softball, track and field, volleyball, and wrestling
- Athletics conference: LHSAA
- Mascot: Wolf
- Team name: Wolves
- Yearbook: Wolves' Echo
- Feeder schools: Armstrong Middle School (Rayne); Branch Elementary School (unincorporated Rayne); Mire Elementary School (unincorporated Rayne)
- Website: rhs.acadia.k12.la.us

Rayne High School is located in Rayne, Louisiana, United States. The school is a part of the Acadia Parish School Board. Mighty Wolves are the mascot. The school has the largest enrollment of any school in the parish.

== History ==
The current high school building was opened in 1938 at a cost of $112,071.50 and initially enrolled grades 8–11. Designed by the architecture firm of Baron and Roberts, it was funded by the Public Works Administration. Previously, all grades had been taught at the current location of Central Rayne Kindergarten, first in a wooden building built in 1888, then in a brick building erected in 1912.

== Athletics ==
Rayne High athletics compete in the Louisiana High School Athletic Association. The school fields teams in baseball, basketball, football, golf, powerlifting, softball, track and field, volleyball, and wrestling.

=== State championships ===
- Baseball, 1993
- Boys' basketball, 1995
- Girls' basketball, 1990

== Notable alumni ==
- Gerald Paddio (class of 1984), basketball small forward for UNLV and the Cleveland Cavaliers, Seattle SuperSonics, Indiana Pacers, New York Knicks, and Washington Bullets
- Byron Mouton (class of 1997), starting forward for the University of Maryland, 2002 NCAA men's basketball national champions
- Josh Reed (class of 1998), American football wide receiver for LSU and the Buffalo Bills
