= Crowley High School (Louisiana) =

High school in Louisiana, United States

Location
- 263 Hensgens Road; Crowley, Louisiana, (Acadia Parish), Louisiana 70526; United States; 30.258975°N 92.401694°W

Information
- Type: Public
- Established: 1904
- Status: Open
- School district: Acadia Parish School Board
- NCES District ID: 2200030
- Superintendent: Carol Tall
- NCES School ID: 220003000006
- Principal: Troy Harmon
- Grades: 9–12
- Enrollment: 546
- Student to teacher ratio: 10.92
- Colors: Green and gold
- Athletics conference: LHSAA District 5-3A
- Mascot: Gents/Ladies
- Website: chs.acadia.k12.la.us

Crowley High School is a public junior and senior high school in Crowley, Louisiana, United States. It is overseen by the Acadia Parish School Board.

Fighting Gents are the school's mascot. Strength and reason is its motto. It was established in 1904.

== History ==
H. C. Ross established a school for African Americans in the area.

Crowley High School was one the first high schools built in Louisiana. It was led by lawyer J. W. Mobley. In 1904, its first graduation was held at the Grand Opera House in Crowley. Rose Wilder read Edgar Allan Poe's The Raven in Latin at the ceremony.

Recognized by the Louisiana State Board of Education in 1908, the high school's initial yearly state appropriation was set at $5,000.

Crowley High School was racially integrated in 1971. The current school was built in 1973.

== Athletics ==
Crowley High athletics competes in the LHSAA.

=== Championships ===
Football championships

- (1) State Championships: 1989

=== Football ===
Coaches

- Lewis Cook - Cook won the 1989 3A state championship at Crowley and he coached teams that played for state championships in 1991 and 1996.
- Brent Indest - Crowley High won district championships in 2005, 2006 and 2015 under Coach Indest.

== Alumni ==
- Rose Wilder Lane
- Orlando Thomas, football defensive back, part of the school's 1989 state champion team
- Johnny Rebel
