= Crowley, Louisiana =

- City
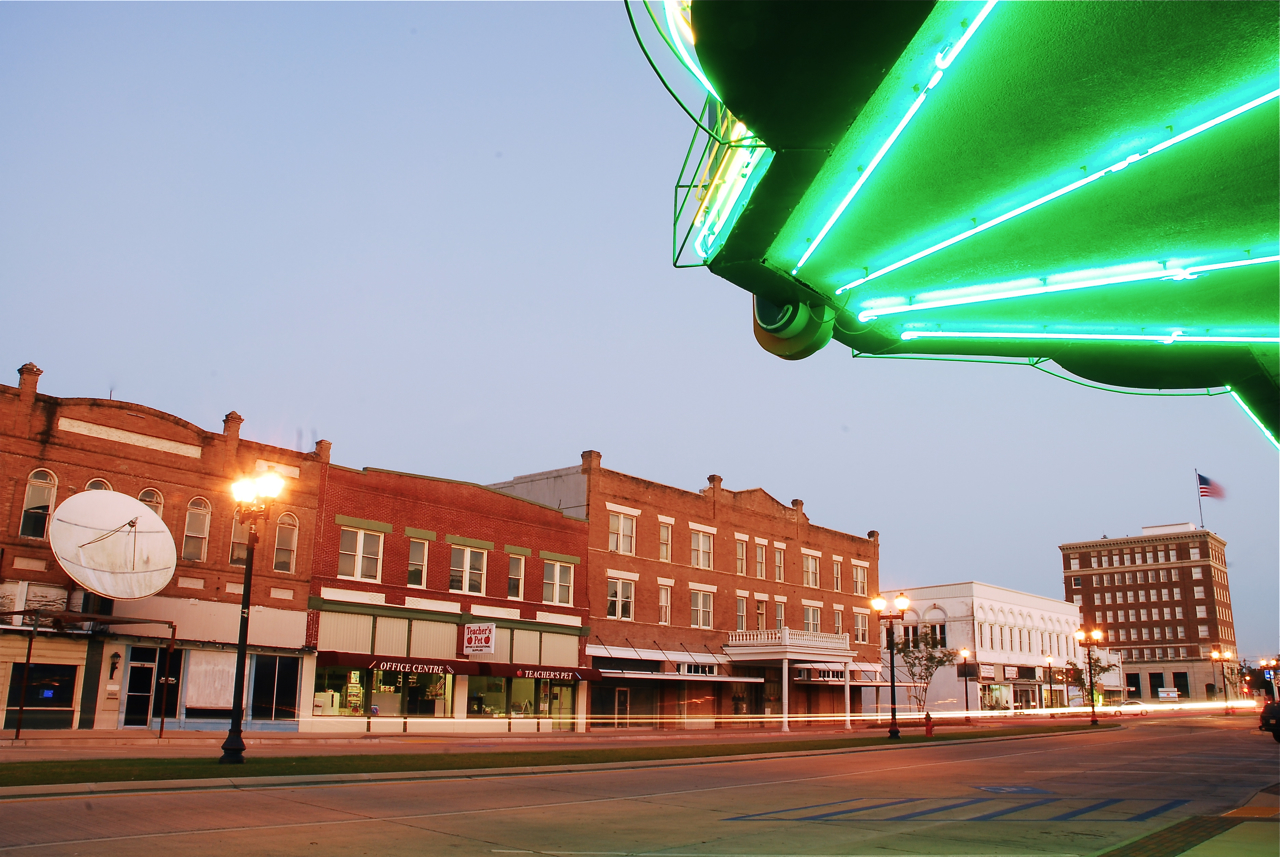
- Downtown Crowley
- Nickname: Rice Capital of America
- Motto: Where Life Is Rice And Easy
- Location of Crowley in Acadia Parish, Louisiana.

- Location of Louisiana in the United States
- Coordinates: 30°13′30″N 92°22′14″W
- Country: United States
- State: Louisiana
- Parish: Acadia
- Incorporated: 1887
- Founded by: C.C. Duson and W.W. Duson
- Named after: Patrick Crowley, railroad owner

Area
  - Total: 5.85 sq mi (15.16 km^{2})
  - Land: 5.85 sq mi (15.15 km^{2})
  - Water: 0 sq mi (0.00 km^{2})
- Elevation: 16 ft (4.9 m)

Population (2020)
  - Total: 11,710
  - Density: 2,001/sq mi (772.7/km^{2})
- Time zone: UTC-6 (CST)
  - Summer (DST): UTC-5 (CDT)
- ZIP code: 70526
- Area code: 337
- FIPS code: 22-18650
- GNIS feature ID: 2404162
- Website: crowley-la.com

Crowley (Local pronunciation: /ˈkræli/) is a city in, and the parish seat of, Acadia Parish in the U.S. state of Louisiana. At the 2020 United States census, Crowley had a population of 11,710. Crowley is the principal city of the Crowley micropolitan statistical area, which includes all of Acadia Parish. It is also part of the larger Lafayette–Acadiana combined statistical area.

== History ==
Crowley was founded in 1886 by brothers C.C. "Curley" Duson and W.W. Duson. Curley Duson was sheriff of St. Landry Parish, of which the Crowley townsite was then a part. Incorporated in 1887, W.W. Duson, General Manager of Southwest Louisiana Land Company, plotted and developed Crowley. W.W. Duson's daughter, Maime Duson, married Percy Lee Lawrence, who founded the First National Bank of Crowley. The 7-story building was once the tallest building between Houston and New Orleans.

The town was named after Patrick E. Crowley (1850-1909), an Irish-born employee of the Louisiana Western Rail Road. Crowley was in charge of a small facility nicknamed "Crowley's Switch" near Estherwood. The Dusons persuaded Crowley to move the switch about seven miles east to the Dusons' land in exchange for naming the town for him.

== Geography ==
According to the United States Census Bureau, the city has a total area of 5.85 square miles (15.2 km^{2}), all land.

Louisiana Highway 13 passes through the city with Kaplan, which is located in Vermilion Parish, being located 19 miles southeast and Eunice, located in both Acadia and St. Landry parishes, is located 20 miles north. The city of Rayne is located 9 miles east of Crowley via U.S. Highway 90 and I-10. The city of Jennings is located 17 miles west via U.S. Highway 90 and I-10.

=== Climate ===
Crowley has a humid subtropical climate (Köppen: Cfa) with long, hot summers and short, mild winters.

Climate data for Crowley 2 NE, Louisiana (1991–2020 normals, extremes 1906–2019)
Month	Jan	Feb	Mar	Apr	May	Jun	Jul	Aug	Sep	Oct	Nov	Dec	Year
Record high °F (°C)	82 (28)	83 (28)	95 (35)	94 (34)	97 (36)	106 (41)	102 (39)	105 (41)	106 (41)	96 (36)	88 (31)	84 (29)	106 (41)
Mean maximum °F (°C)	75.7 (24.3)	77.4 (25.2)	82.2 (27.9)	86.1 (30.1)	91.6 (33.1)	95.5 (35.3)	96.2 (35.7)	97.6 (36.4)	94.9 (34.9)	90.2 (32.3)	83.5 (28.6)	78.3 (25.7)	97.9 (36.6)
Mean daily maximum °F (°C)	60.6 (15.9)	64.4 (18.0)	71.2 (21.8)	77.5 (25.3)	84.3 (29.1)	89.2 (31.8)	90.7 (32.6)	91.5 (33.1)	88.1 (31.2)	80.7 (27.1)	70.4 (21.3)	62.9 (17.2)	77.6 (25.3)
Daily mean °F (°C)	51.1 (10.6)	54.8 (12.7)	61.6 (16.4)	68.1 (20.1)	75.6 (24.2)	80.9 (27.2)	82.4 (28.0)	82.5 (28.1)	78.7 (25.9)	69.9 (21.1)	59.9 (15.5)	53.3 (11.8)	68.2 (20.1)
Mean daily minimum °F (°C)	41.6 (5.3)	45.2 (7.3)	52.0 (11.1)	58.8 (14.9)	67.0 (19.4)	72.5 (22.5)	74.1 (23.4)	73.5 (23.1)	69.2 (20.7)	59.1 (15.1)	49.3 (9.6)	43.7 (6.5)	58.8 (14.9)
Mean minimum °F (°C)	26.0 (−3.3)	30.9 (−0.6)	34.8 (1.6)	42.2 (5.7)	54.1 (12.3)	65.5 (18.6)	69.4 (20.8)	68.2 (20.1)	56.4 (13.6)	43.2 (6.2)	34.0 (1.1)	29.1 (−1.6)	24.3 (−4.3)
Record low °F (°C)	6 (−14)	14 (−10)	22 (−6)	34 (1)	44 (7)	54 (12)	62 (17)	57 (14)	41 (5)	29 (−2)	22 (−6)	9 (−13)	6 (−14)
Average precipitation inches (mm)	6.40 (163)	4.26 (108)	3.84 (98)	5.34 (136)	5.58 (142)	6.68 (170)	5.77 (147)	6.21 (158)	4.95 (126)	4.69 (119)	5.04 (128)	4.77 (121)	63.53 (1,614)
Average precipitation days (≥ 0.01 in)	10.4	8.7	7.8	7.0	7.6	11.2	12.8	11.3	8.8	7.0	7.7	9.7	110.0
Source: NOAA

== Demographics ==
Historical population
Census	Pop.	Note	%±
1890	420		—
1900	4,214		903.3%
1910	5,099		21.0%
1920	6,108		19.8%
1930	7,656		25.3%
1940	9,523		24.4%
1950	12,784		34.2%
1960	15,617		22.2%
1970	16,104		3.1%
1980	16,036		−0.4%
1990	13,983		−12.8%
2000	14,225		1.7%
2010	13,265		−6.7%
2020	11,710		−11.7%
2025 (est.)	11,223	▼	−4.2%
U.S. Decennial Census

Crowley racial composition as of 2020
Race	Number	Percentage
White (non-Hispanic)	7,059	60.28%
Black or African American (non-Hispanic)	3,834	32.74%
Native American	25	0.21%
Asian	51	0.44%
Other/Mixed	348	2.97%
Hispanic or Latino	393	3.36%

At the 2020 United States census, there were 11,710 people, 4,807 households, and 2,934 families residing in the city. At the 2019 American Community Survey, there were 4,807 households.

In 2019, the racial and ethnic makeup of the city was 58.5% non-Hispanic or Latino white, 34.8% Black or African American, <0.0% Asian, 0.4% some other race, 1.9% two or more races, and 4.4% Hispanic and Latin American of any race. At the 2000 U.S. census, the racial and ethic makeup was 67.83% White American, 30.98% Black or African American, 0.15% American Indian and Alaska Native, 0.29% Asian, 0.01% Native Hawaiian or other Pacific Islander, 0.23% from other races, and 0.51% from two or more races. Hispanics and Latin Americans were 1.10% of the population.

There were 4,807 households, and 33.5% were married couples living together, 18.5% male households with no female present, and 41.8% female households with no male present. The average family size was 3.34.

In the city, the population was spread out, with 5.4% aged 5 and under, 72.4% aged 18 and older, and 17.2% aged 65 and older. The median age was 37.7 years, up from 35 years at the 2000 United States census.

The median income for a household in the city was $26,972. Family households had a median income of $31,168, married couples had a median income of $50,066, and non-family households had a median income of $19,138. An estimated 37.1% of the population lived at or below the poverty line.

== Arts and culture ==
Crowley is noted for its annual International Rice Festival. Crowley has the nickname of "Rice Capital of the World", because at one time it was a major center for rice harvesting and milling. Today, Crowley still has a number of rice mills and rice is the main crop of many local farmers.

== Education ==
The Crowley High School "Fighting Gents" were State Division 3A champions in the 1989 football season and had an 8–2 regular season.

Crowley is also the home of Notre Dame High School. Notre Dame is an Acadia Parish-wide Catholic high school whose football program has won six state championships and numerous District Champion titles, in addition to numerous state championships in other sports, such as men's baseball, women's softball, men's tennis, men's track & field, and women's volleyball.

== Notable people ==
- John Breaux, member of United States Senate and House of Representatives
- Jack Brooks, member of the United States House of Representatives
- Pimp C, record producer and rapper
- Tommy Casanova, football player and former Louisiana State Senator.
- Bill Cleveland, Crowley real estate developer and member of Louisiana state legislature
- Denis Reggie, wedding photographer
- Edwin Edwards, former governor of Louisiana, U.S. representative, and state senator
- Jim Gueno, Green Bay Packers linebacker
- Winsor Harmon, soap opera actor
- Eric Hetzel, former pitcher for the Boston Red Sox
- Chris John, Democratic member of the United States House of Representatives
- Edward "Kidd" Jordan, jazz saxophonist
- Victoria Reggie Kennedy, second wife of Senator Edward M. Kennedy
- Rose Wilder Lane, author
- J. D. "Jay" Miller, composer, musician, recording engineer
- Phil Phillips, American singer and songwriter
- Orlando Thomas, Minnesota Vikings defensive back
- Clifford Joseph "Pee Wee" Trahan, singer
- Godfrey Zaunbrecher, American football player
