= Joseph Bernard =

Joseph Bernard may refer to:

- Joseph Bernard (sculptor) (1866–1931), modern classical French sculptor
- Joseph Bernard (actor) (1923–2006), American actor
- Joseph E. Bernard (1880–1958), American character actor
- Joseph Alphonsus Bernard (1881–1962), Canadian politician
- Joseph Karl Bernard (1780–1850), Austrian journalist and librettist
- Joe Bernard (baseball) (1882–1960), American baseball player
- Joe Bernard (American football) (born c. 1963), American college football coach

== See also ==
- Hans Zatzka (1859–1945), Austrian painter who used the pseudonym 'Joseph Bernard'
- Joseph D. Bernard House, Rayne, Louisiana
