= List of Art Deco architecture in Louisiana =

This is a list of buildings that are examples of the Art Deco architectural style in Louisiana, United States.

Louisiana State Capitol, Baton Rouge

== Baton Rouge ==
- Baton Rouge Savings and Loan Association, Baton Rouge
- Campbell Apartment Building, Baton Rouge, 1930
- Howard Auditorium, Louisiana State University, Baton Rouge, 1940
- S. H. Kress and Co. Building, Baton Rouge, 1935, 1960
- Lincoln Theater, Baton Rouge, 1950
- Louisiana State Capitol, Baton Rouge, 1932
- United States Post Office and Courthouse, Baton Rouge, 1932

== Lake Charles ==
- Artists Civic Theatre and Studio (ACTS) Theatre, Lake Charles, 1940
- Bulber Auditorium, McNeese State University, Lake Charles, 1940
- Kaufman Hall, McNeese State University, Lake Charles, 1941

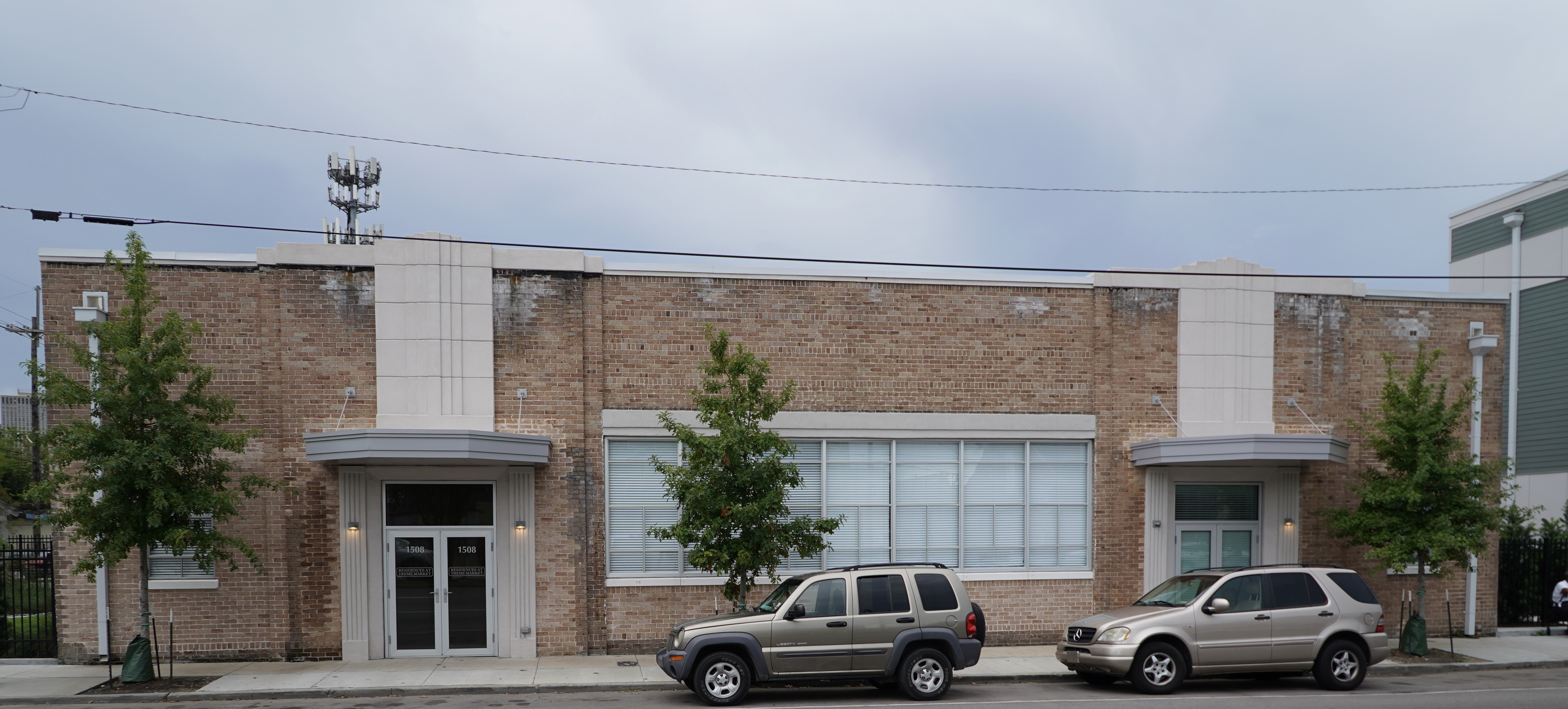
Tremé Market, New Orleans

== New Orleans ==
- Algy Theater, New Orleans, 1940s
- Alvar Street Library, New Orleans, 1940
- Ashton B&B (former Ashton Theater), New Orleans, 1927
- Blue Plate Building, New Orleans, 1941
- Carver Theater, New Orleans, 1950
- Charity Hospital, New Orleans, 1939
- Eleanor McMain Secondary School, New Orleans, 1932
- F. Edward Hebert Federal Building, New Orleans, 1939
- Flint-Goodridge Hospital of Dillard University, New Orleans, 1931
- Gem Theater, New Orleans, 1947
- General Laundry Cleaners & Dryers, New Orleans, 1929
- Gus Mayer Department Store, New Orleans, 1948
- Joy Theater, New Orleans, 1947
- Lakefront Airport, New Orleans, 1930s
- Mangel's, New Orleans
- National American Bank Building, New Orleans, 1929
- Orleans Parish Criminal Court, New Orleans, 1931
- Rosetree Blown Glass Studio and Gallery (former Rosetree Theater), 1930s
- Sister Stanislaus Memorial Building, New Orleans, 1938
- Tivoli Theatre, New Orleans, 1927
- Tremé Market, New Orleans
- William Frantz Elementary School, New Orleans, 1937

== New Iberia ==
- Evangeline Theater (now Sliman Theatre for the Performing Arts), 129 East Main Street, Downtown New Iberia Commercial Historic District, New Iberia, 1929 and 1940
- Iberia Parish Courthouse and Jail, New Iberia, 1940
- Wormser's Department Store, New Iberia

== Shreveport ==
- Capri Theatre (former Saenger Theatre), Shreveport, 1911 and 1940s
- Louisiana State Exhibit Building, Shreveport, 1937
- Masonic Temple, Shreveport, 1937
- Salvation Army, Shreveport, 1937
- Shreveport Municipal Memorial Auditorium, Shreveport, 1929

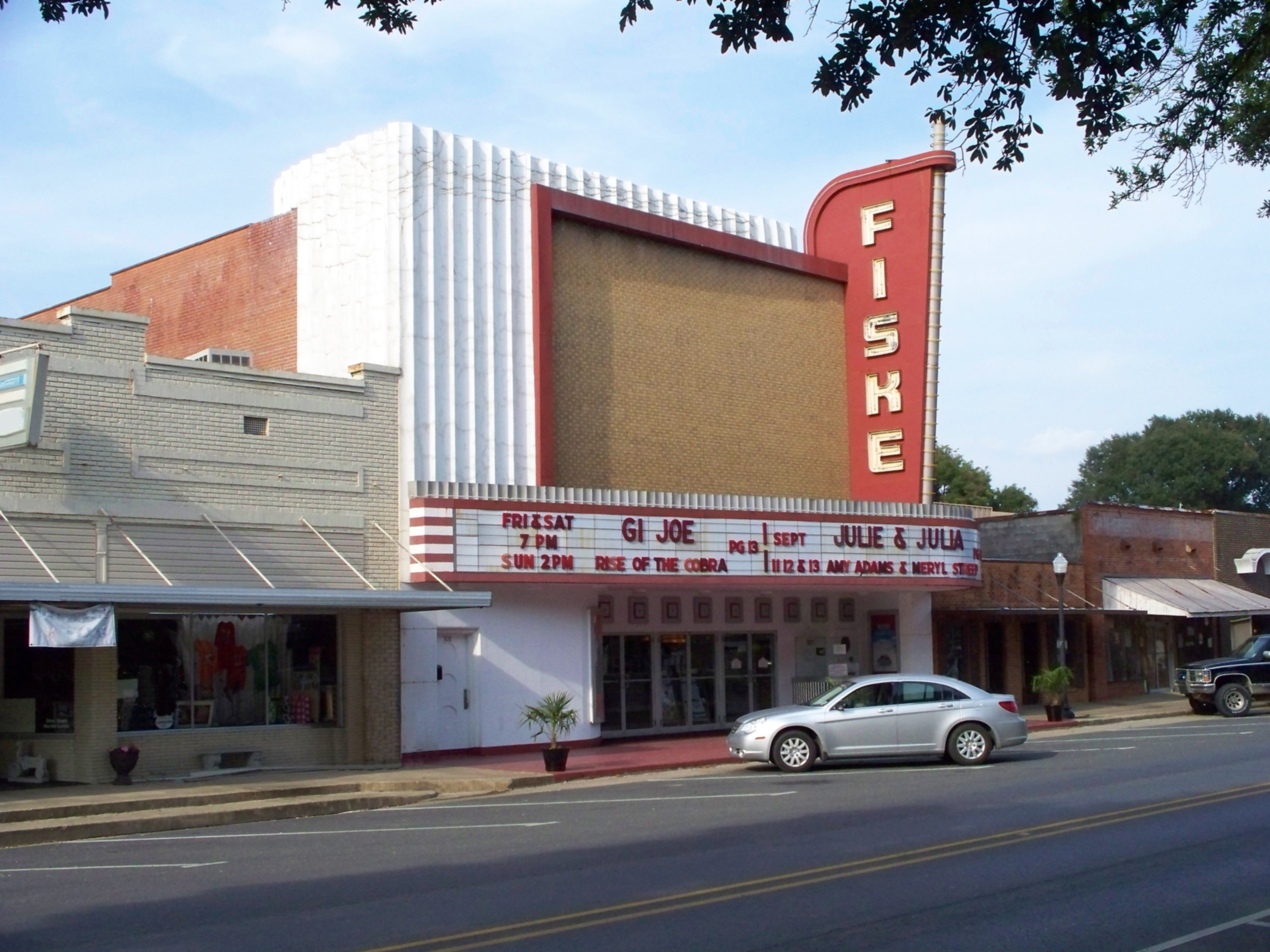
Fiske Theatre, Oak Grove, West Carroll Parish

== Other cities ==
- Acadia City Hall, Crowley Historic District, Crowley, 1931
- Acadia Parish Courthouse, Crowley Historic District, Crowley, 1952
- Big D Corral Theatre, DeRidder Commercial Historic District, DeRidder, 1940
- Caldwell Parish Courthouse, Columbia, 1937
- City Hall, Winnfield, 1937
- Concordia Parish Courthouse, Vidalia, 1939
- Denham Springs City Hall, Denham Springs, 1940
- Dixie Center for the Arts, Ruston, 1928 and 1933
- Dual State Monument, Union County, 1931
- East Carroll Parish Courthouse and Jail, Lake Providence, 1938
- Fiske Theatre, Oak Grove, West Carroll Parish, 1950
- Gymnasium, Napoleonville, 1930s
- Jackson Parish Courthouse and Jail, Jonesboro, 1938
- Lafayette International Center, Lafayette, 1939
- Lafourche Parish Jail, Thibodoaux, 1940s
- Mama's Place, Metairie
- More Mileage Gas Station, Jennings, 1938
- Napoleon Middle School Gymnasium, Napoleonville, 1939
- Natchitoches Parish Courthouse, Natchitoches, 1940
- Old Brusly High School Gymnasium, Brusly, 1937
- Palace Theatre, Jonesboro, 1929
- Port Allen High School, Port Allen, 1937
- Rapides Parish Courthouse and Jail, Alexandria, 1940
- Rayville Light & Water Plant, Rayville, 1940
- Rice Theatre, Crowley Historic District, Crowley, 1941
- Ruston High School, Ruston, 1921 and 1940
- St. Bernard Parish Courthouse, Chalmette, 1939
- St. Helena Parish Courthouse, Greensburg, 1937
- St. Landry Parish Courthouse, Opelousas Historic District, Opelousas, 1940
- Strand Theatre, Jennings, 1939
- United States Post Office, Leesville, 1936
- United States Post Office and Courthouse, Alexandria, 1932
- United States Post Office and Courthouse, Arcadia, 1937
- United States Post Office and Courthouse, Monroe, 1934

== See also ==
- List of Art Deco architecture
- List of Art Deco architecture in the United States
