= National Register of Historic Places listings in Acadia Parish, Louisiana =

Location of Acadia Parish in Louisiana

This is a list of the National Register of Historic Places listings in Acadia Parish, Louisiana.

This is intended to be a complete list of the properties on the National Register of Historic Places in Acadia Parish, Louisiana, United States. The locations of National Register properties for which the latitude and longitude coordinates are included below, may be seen in a map.

There are 12 properties listed on the National Register in the parish. Another property was once listed, but has been removed.

This National Park Service list is complete through NPS recent listings posted May 22, 2026.

== Current listings ==
	Name on the Register	Image	Date listed	Location	City or town	Description
1	Joseph D. Bernard House	Joseph D. Bernard House	June 29, 2001 (#01000119)	1023 The Boulevard; 30°14′51″N 92°16′12″W	Rayne	
2	Bunche Library		March 6, 2026 (#100012783)	1100 Section Street; 30°14′51″N 92°16′15″W	Rayne	
3	Colorado Southern Railroad Depot	Colorado Southern Railroad Depot	March 26, 1980 (#80001693)	Corner of North Avenue G and East Front Street; 30°12′36″N 92°22′12″W	Crowley	Also a contributing property to Crowley Historic District
4	Crowley Historic District	Crowley Historic District	March 12, 1982 (#82002751)	Roughly bounded by East 6th Street, North Avenue M, East 2nd Street, South Avenue H, East Ash Street, South Avenue G, East Mill Street and North Avenue F; also roughly bounded by West 7th St., the rear property lines in the 600 blk. of North Parkerson Ave., West 6th St., North Avenue F, and North Avenue G. 30°12′39″N 92°22′18″W	Crowley	When first listed, the 210 acres (85 ha) area historic district comprised a total of 266 buildings constructed between 1887 and 1931. A boundary increase was approved January 25, 2024.
5	Emile L. Daboval Jr. House		October 10, 2023 (#100008747)	305 East Louisiana Ave. 30°14′09″N 92°15′59″W	Rayne	
6	Ellis Hoffpauir House	Ellis Hoffpauir House	June 5, 1997 (#97000467)	210 LeBlanc Street; 30°10′56″N 92°27′52″W	Estherwood	
7	Istre Cemetery Grave Houses	Istre Cemetery Grave Houses	February 21, 2008 (#07000545)	Along Swift Road, about 0.68 miles (1.09 km) south of intersection with Legros Road; 30°06′56″N 92°33′55″W	Morse	
8	Le Vieux Presbytere	Le Vieux Presbytere	May 30, 1997 (#97000508)	101 South Rogers Street; 30°24′22″N 92°12′56″W	Church Point	
9	Rayne Historic District		May 26, 2026 (#100011959)	Roughly bounded by Clegg Street, Edwards Street, Parkerson Street, Arenas Street, Bernard Street, Gabriel's Alley, Perrodin Street, 4th street, West South 1st Street, and the railroad tracks. 30°14′06″N 92°16′07″W	Rayne	
10	David L. and Jeanette Ross May House	David L. and Jeanette Ross May House	February 27, 2019 (#100003380)	576 N. Western Ave. 30°12′43″N 92°22′54″W	Crowley	
11	St. Theresa Catholic Church and School	St. Theresa Catholic Church and School	June 19, 2018 (#100002576)	417 West 3rd Street; 30°12′36″N 92°22′32″W	Crowley	
12	Shrine of Our Mother of Mercy Catholic Church and School		September 20, 2025 (#100010045)	707 Lyman Avenue; 30°14′32″N 92°16′26″W	Rayne	

== Former listings ==
	Name on the Register	Image	Date listed	Date removed	Location	City or town	Description
1	Lewis & Taylor Lumberyard Office	Lewis & Taylor Lumberyard Office	July 14, 1995 (#95000812)	July 22, 2016	403 E. Louisiana Ave. 30°14′10″N 92°15′56″W	Rayne	Building demolished or heavily altered.

== See also ==
- List of National Historic Landmarks in Louisiana
- National Register of Historic Places listings in Louisiana
