= Bunche Library =

Historical African American library in Louisiana

Coordinates: 30°14′50.4″N 92°16′13.9″W

Bunche Library is a historic library in Rayne, Louisiana. It opened in 1953 as a library for African American patrons during segregation. The library is listed on the National Register of Historic Places and is located at 1100 Section Street.

The library was named for civil rights leader Ralph Bunche. It closed in the 1980s and later stood vacant. After the building was purchased, it was used for storage before being restored. Following its restoration, the library reopened for monthly service on the first Saturday of each month.

Bunche Library was rededicated on Juneteenth in 2024. Tours of former Rayne mayor Bernard Bertrand's house were also held as part of the celebration.

A newspaper clipping published before the library opened identified Montez Guidry as the librarian for the Acadia Parish library unit for African American residents. The clipping stated that the library was expected to open for four to six hours each week and gave its location as 305 Reynolds Street.

== See also ==
- National Register of Historic Places listings in Acadia Parish, Louisiana
