= Emile L. Daboval Jr. House =

Historic home in Rayne, Louisiana, US

Coordinates: 30.2361°N 92.2664°W

Emile L. Daboval Jr. House is a historic home in Rayne, Louisiana (Acadia Parish). Built in the Victorian Eastlake style architecture, it is listed on the National Register of Historic Places. It is at 305 East Louisiana Avenue.

The home is in the proposed Rayne Historic District.

Daboval and his father were in the rice milling business. He also owned a hotel and worked as a rice broker. He served as mayor of Rayne, Louisiana. The home is across from railroad trace and two blocks from the Rayne Rice Mill.

== See also ==
- National Register of Historic Places listings in Acadia Parish, Louisiana
