= David L. and Jeanette Ross May House =

Historic house in Crowley, Louisiana

- U.S. National Register of Historic Places
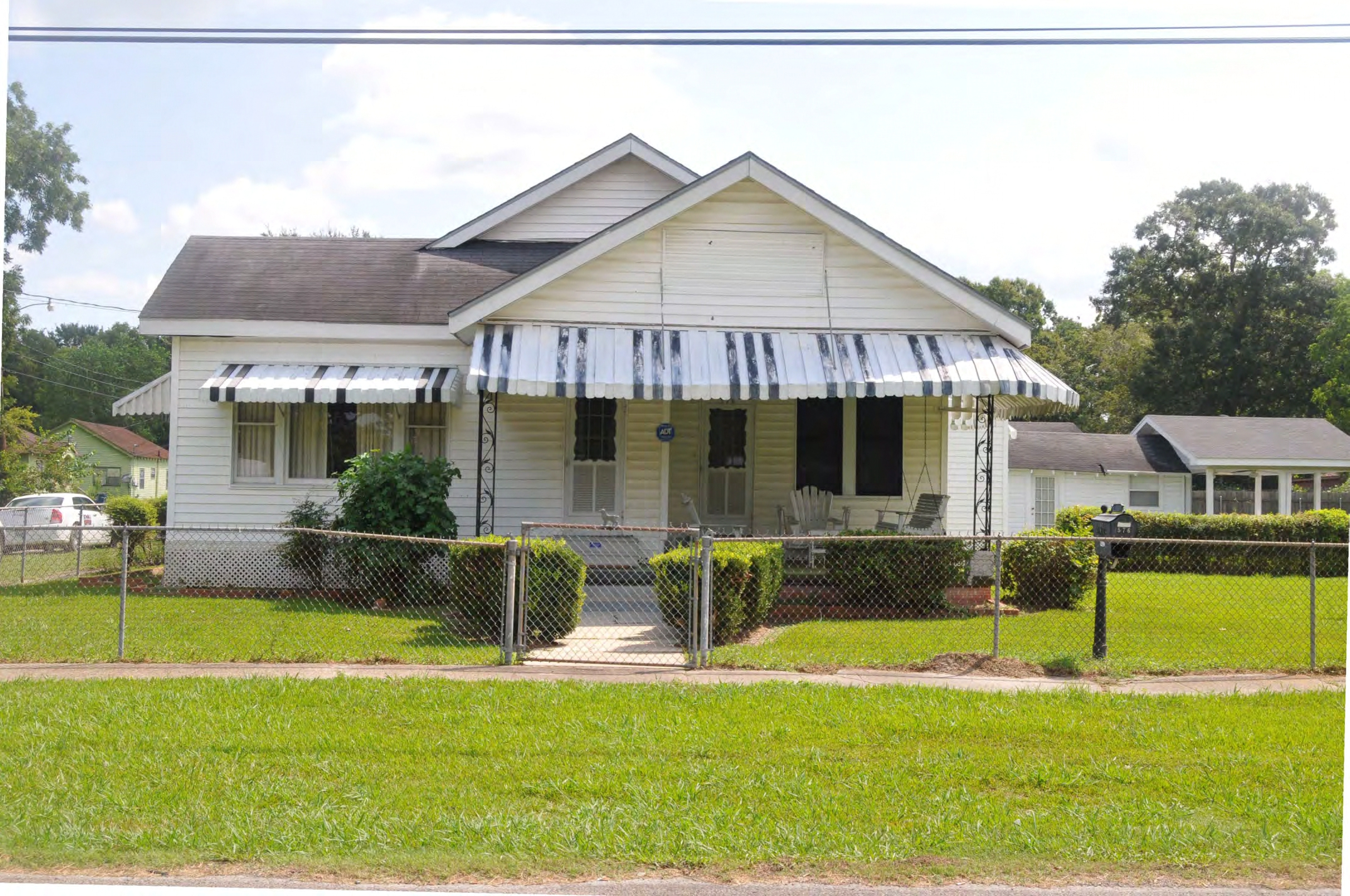

- Location within Louisiana Location within the United States
- Location: 576 North Western Avenue, Crowley, Louisiana
- Coordinates: 30.212195°N 92.381503°W
- Area: Less than 1 acre
- Built: c. 1935
- Architectural style: Bungalow/American Craftsman
- NRHP reference No.: 100003380
- Added to NRHP: February 27, 2019

The David L. and Jeanette Ross May House is a historic residence in Crowley, Louisiana. Built around 1935, the house was the home of educators and civic leaders David L. May and Jeanette Ross May, two prominent figures in Crowley's African American community during the era of segregation. It was listed on the National Register of Historic Places on February 27, 2019.

The property is significant for its association with the Mays, who were longtime educators at Crowley's Black public schools and community leaders whose home served as a meeting place for students, teachers, and civic organizations. It is also associated with David May's service as one of the first two African American aldermen elected in Louisiana since Reconstruction.

== Description ==
The house stands on a large corner lot at North Western Avenue and West 6th Street, about six blocks from the Acadia Parish Courthouse in downtown Crowley. It is a one-story frame dwelling in the bungalow/Craftsman tradition, with a cross-gabled roof, an inset half-width front porch, and wood windows that include 2/2, 1/1, and picture-window configurations. Other surviving features include multi-light entry doors, original wood trim, picture rails, wood floors, French doors, five-panel interior doors, glass doorknobs, and built-in cabinetry in David May's former office.

Although the house has been altered, it retains a high degree of integrity. The exterior has vinyl siding placed over the original siding, and some interior rooms were updated in the mid-20th century with paneling and acoustic ceiling tiles. A rear porch was enclosed in the 1950s to create a den; because this work was completed during the house's period of significance, it is considered part of the property's historic evolution.

The property includes a contributing one-car detached garage, probably built soon after the house, and a non-contributing two-car garage of later date.

== History ==
The house was built sometime between 1930 and 1935. The 1930 United States census recorded David and Jeanette May living with Jeanette's father, Henry Clay Ross, on Avenue G in Crowley, while the 1940 census placed the couple at their later home on North Western Avenue; Sanborn fire insurance maps also indicate that the present house was constructed between 1931 and 1948. Based on those records and the building's architectural character, the nomination used a construction date of about 1935.

The lot was closely tied to Black education in Crowley even before the house was built. A school formerly stood on the site in the early 20th century, and the Mays' house later stood one block from Ross High School, where both David and Jeanette May worked for decades.

=== Jeanette Ross May ===
Jeanette Ross May, the daughter of educator and minister Henry Clay Ross, attended Southern University High School and later earned teaching credentials from Southern University. She returned to Crowley and joined the faculty of the Crowley Industrial School, later known as Ross High School, where she taught several subjects, coached girls' basketball, directed music, and eventually became the school's first librarian. She also provided library services for other schools in the area on Saturdays.

Outside the classroom, she was active in organizations including the Order of the Eastern Star, the National Association of University Women, church groups, and the Retired Teachers Association. She taught for 46 years before retiring in 1967.

=== David L. May ===
David L. May was also an educator at Crowley's Black schools and served in the U.S. Army during World War II. After teaching for several years, he was appointed principal in 1942 by Henry Clay Ross and later became principal of Ross High School, serving until 1967. During his tenure he participated in district educational meetings and school improvement efforts and was recognized as an important local school leader.

In 1954, May and businessman Joseph A. Pete were elected to the Crowley City Council, becoming the first two African American Aldermen elected in Louisiana since Reconstruction. May served from 1954 to 1962 and maintained his alderman office in the house. In later years he was appointed by Governor Edwin Edwards as the first Black member of the Louisiana Board of Examiners of Nursing Home Administrators.

May was also active in numerous civic bodies, including the Acadia Parish Library Board, the Council on Aging, the Housing Authority Board, the People's Investment Company, the American Legion, and alumni and retired teachers' organizations.

== Significance ==
The house is locally significant under Criterion B in the areas of education and politics/government for its association with David and Jeanette Ross May. The nomination identified the Mays as two of the most significant African American educators and leaders in Crowley during segregation, noting that their home functioned not only as a residence but also as a center of community activity. Former students and residents remembered the house as a place for meetings, luncheons, school-related activities, and gatherings connected to civic organizations.

Because of its proximity to Ross High School and its use by the Mays during their long educational careers, the house was described in the nomination as an extension of the school itself. Its significance was strengthened by David May's political career, particularly his barrier-breaking election in 1954 and his use of the house as an office while in public service.

The property's period of significance extends from about 1935, when the house was built and occupied by the Mays, to 1968, following the National Register's 50-year guideline at the time of nomination.

== See also ==
- National Register of Historic Places listings in Acadia Parish, Louisiana
