= Hans Zatzka =

Austrian academic and fantasy painter

Hans Zatzka (8 March 1859 – 17 December 1945 or 1949) was an Austrian Academic and fantasy painter. He has sometimes been known as P. Ronsard, Pierre de Ronsard, or H. Zabateri, and signed many of his works as Joseph Bernard, J. Bernard, or Bernard Zatzka. The purpose of Zatzka's vast array of pseudonyms was to avoid penalties for breaking contracts which limited the amount of artwork he could sell. This has caused some art databases to conflate Zatzka's work under the pseudonym Joseph Bernard with the French sculptor with the same name.

== Biography ==
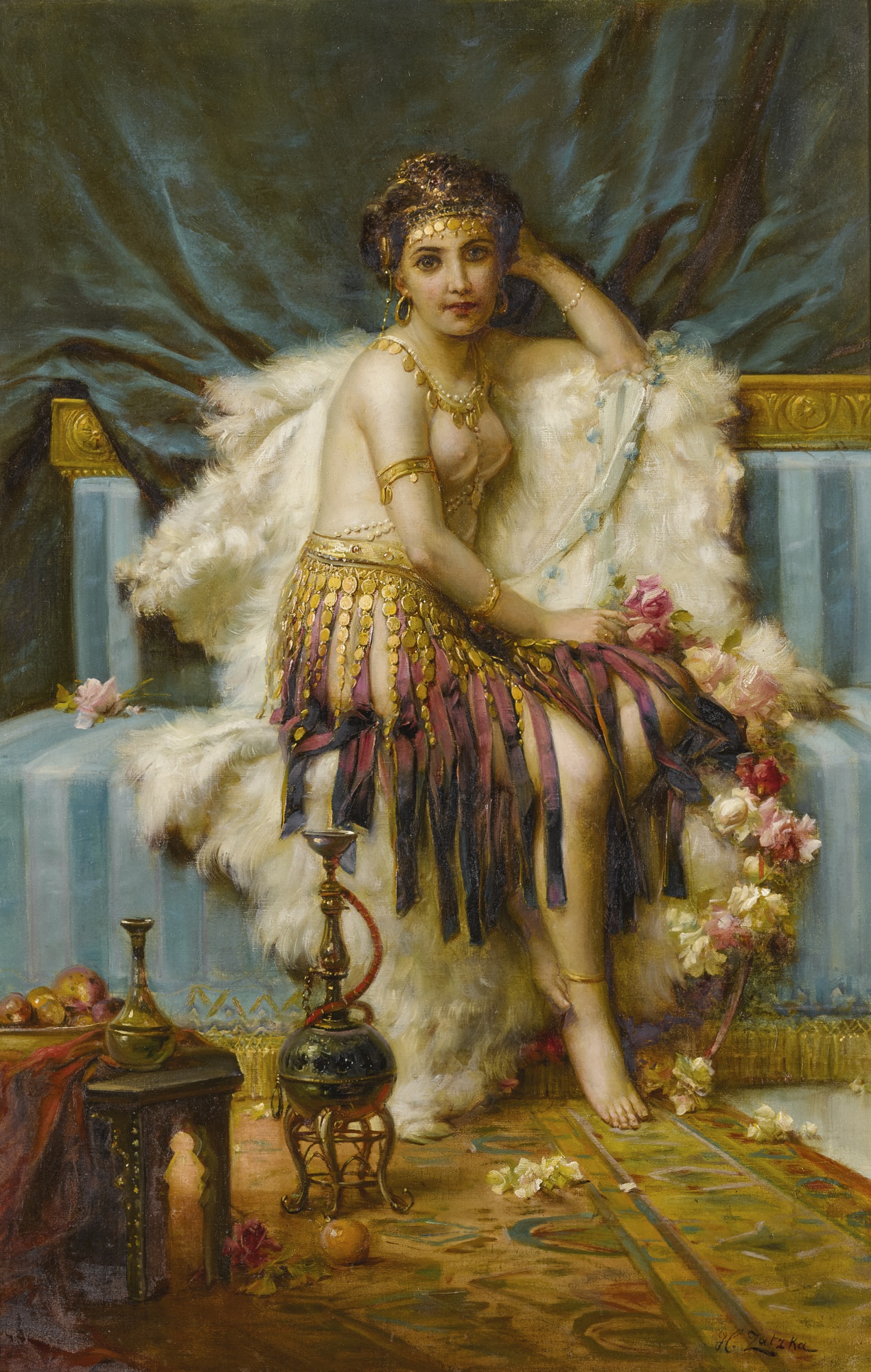
Beauty with Flowers in an Interior

Hans Zatzka was born on 8 March 1859 in Vienna. His father Bartholomaüs was a construction worker, and his mother was Marie Karpischek Zatzka. Between 1877 and 1882, he studied at the Academie des Beaux-Arts, under Christian Griepenkerl, Carl Wurzinger, and Karl von Blaas. Zatzka was able to earn a living through the production of frescoes for churches and other institutions.

In 1885, Zatzka was commissioned to create the ceiling fresco The Naiad of Baden at Kurhaus Baden.

== Artwork ==
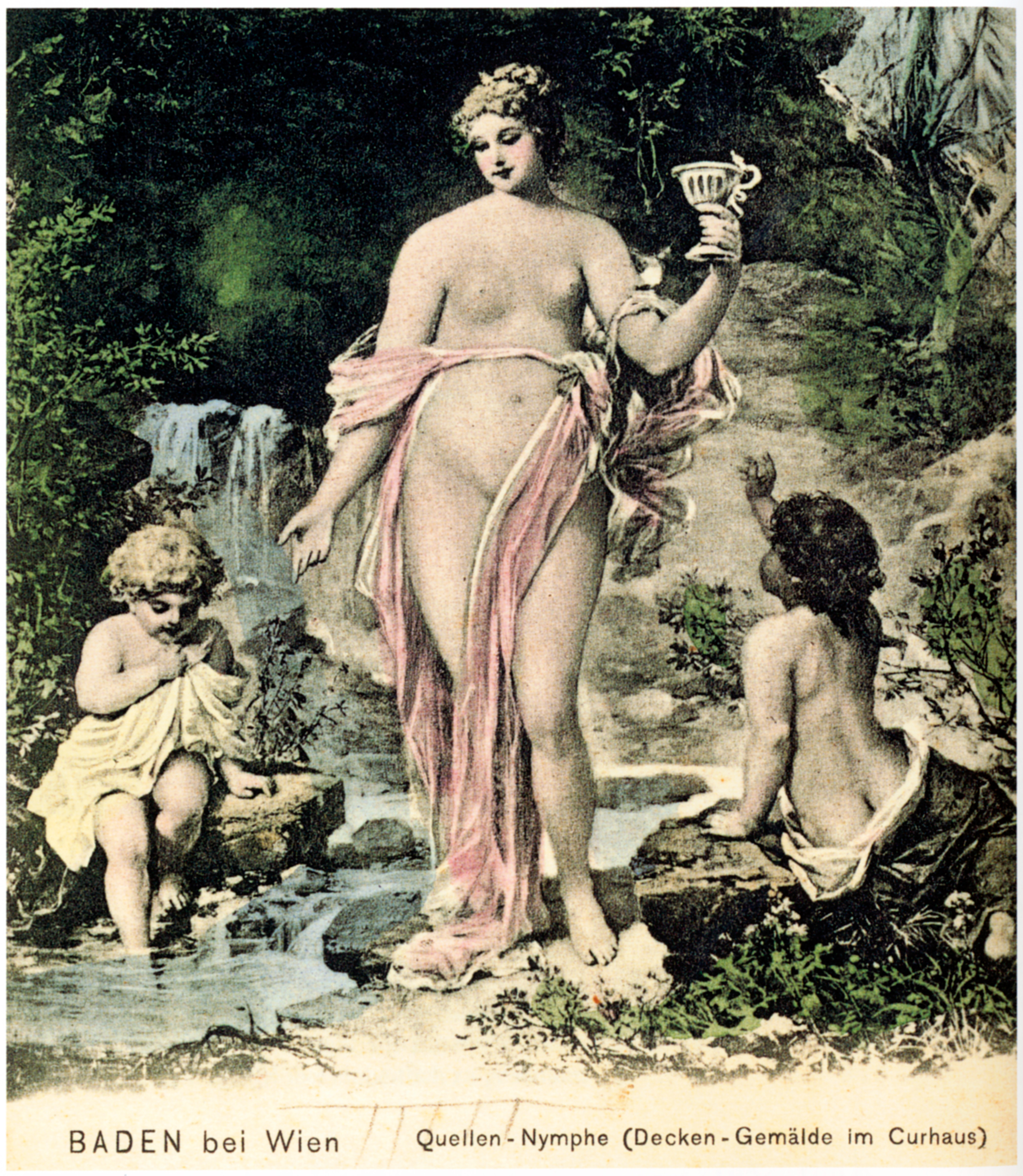
Die Quellnymphe, as reproduced on a postcard in 1890

Many of Zatzka's works were religious paintings and altar pieces dedicated to various churches in Austria. However, he is more known for his paintings of women, fairies, and other fantastical scenes. Often, he would draw inspiration from the works of Richard Wagner and the fairy tales of the Brothers Grimm.

In the late 19th and early 20th century, several pieces by Zatzka were photographed and made into commercial and collectable postcards.

During the 1920s, Zatzka's style became the decor of choice throughout Europe. In addition, the previous thirty years held a resurgence for Zatzka.

Currently, most of Zatzka's paintings reside in private collections.

=== Sales ===
Between 1997 and 2008, 619 of his paintings had been sold, amounting to a total value of $945,495. On average his paintings sell for $49,762. The greatest sum a painting has garnered in auction was $176,988.

In 2007, Zatka's 'A superb pair of oval paintings on canvas' sold at the Aspire Auctions for $53,763.

== Legacy ==
In 2004, Somalia created stamps with four Zatzka motifs: a harem dancer, a few nymphs, a spring goddess, and the night sky.

=== Awards ===
- 1880: Golden Fügermedal

== Gallery ==
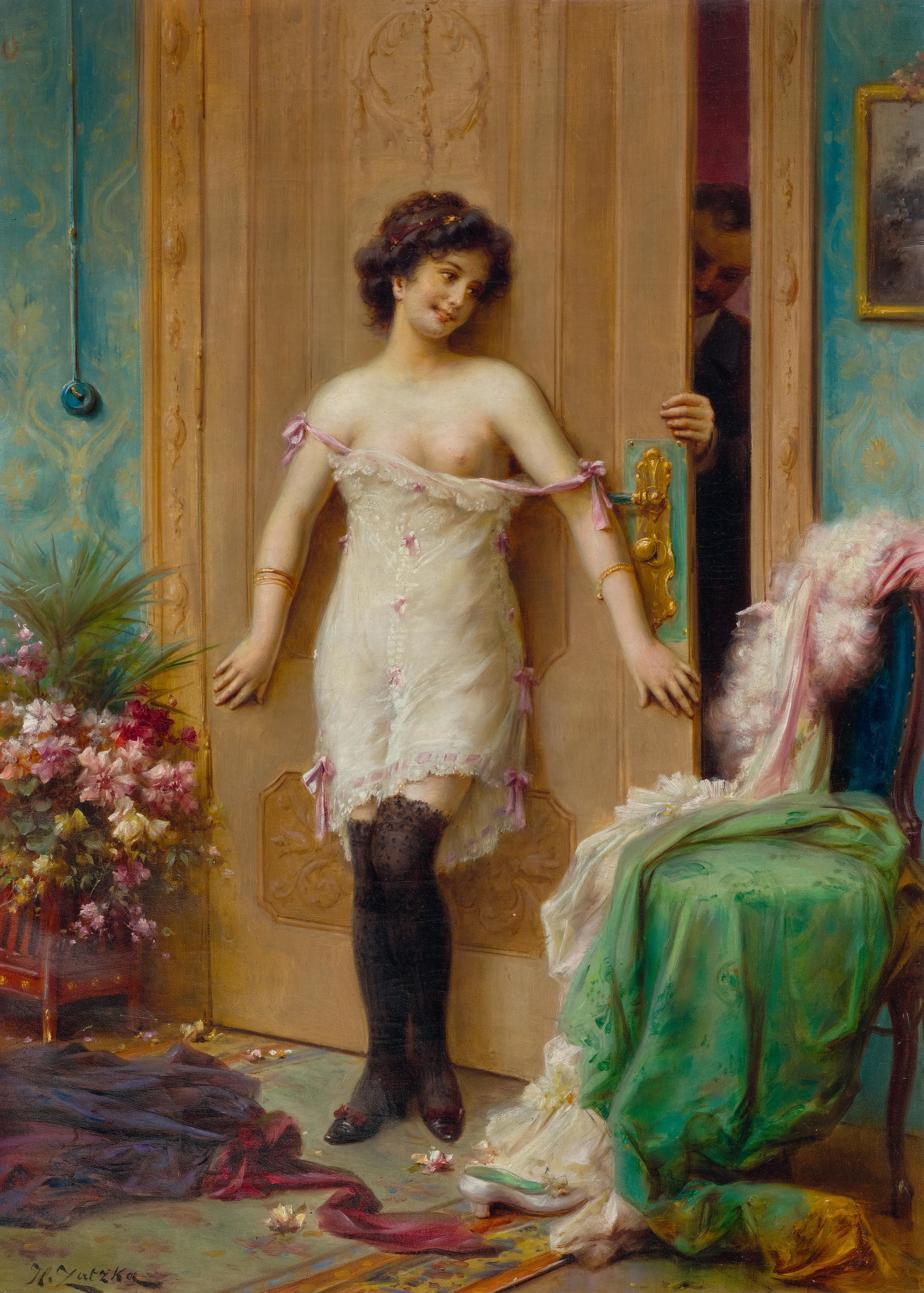
The Temptation

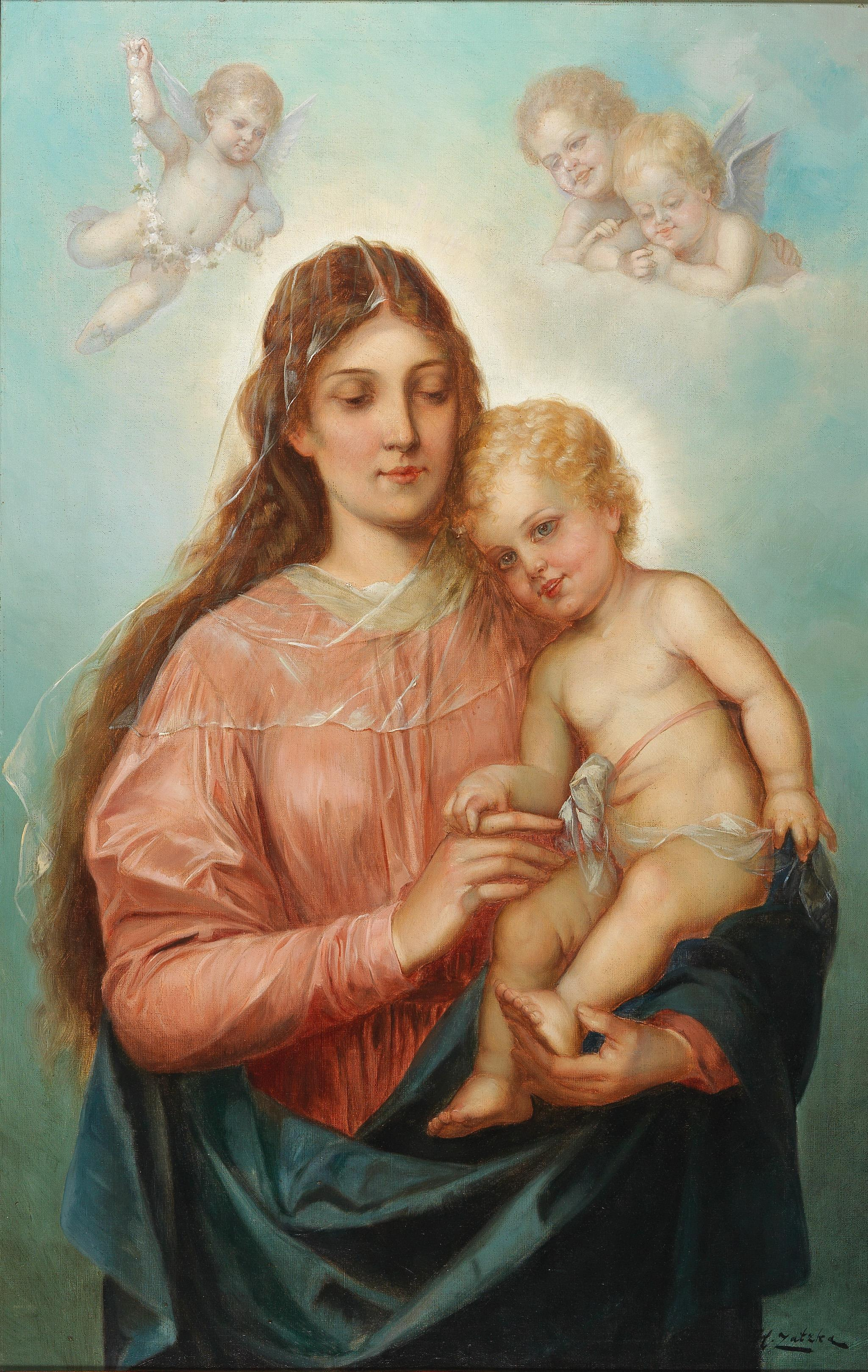
Madonna and Child with Angels

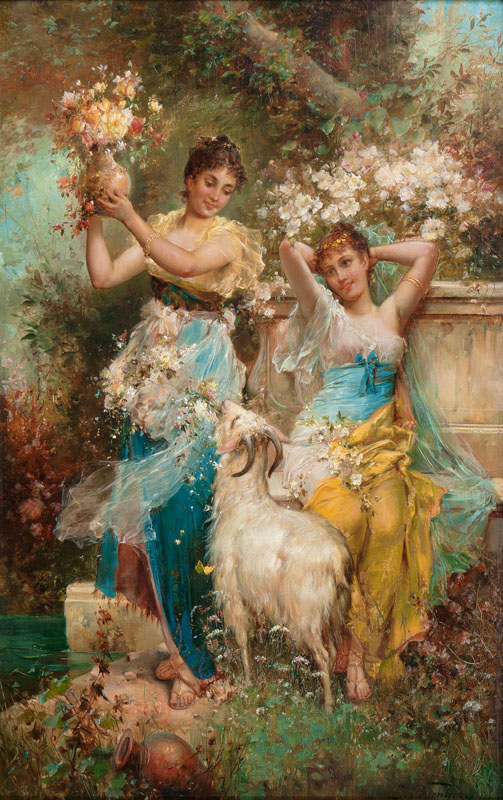
Two Women and a Goat

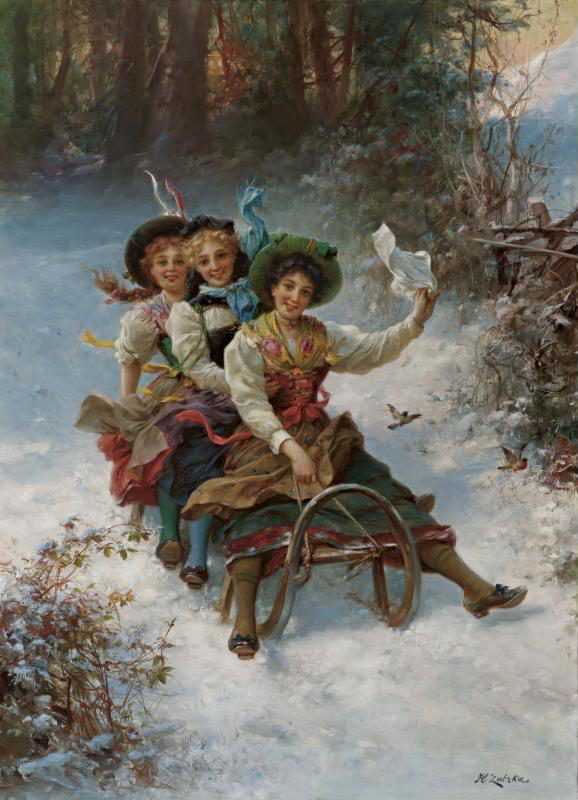
Sledding

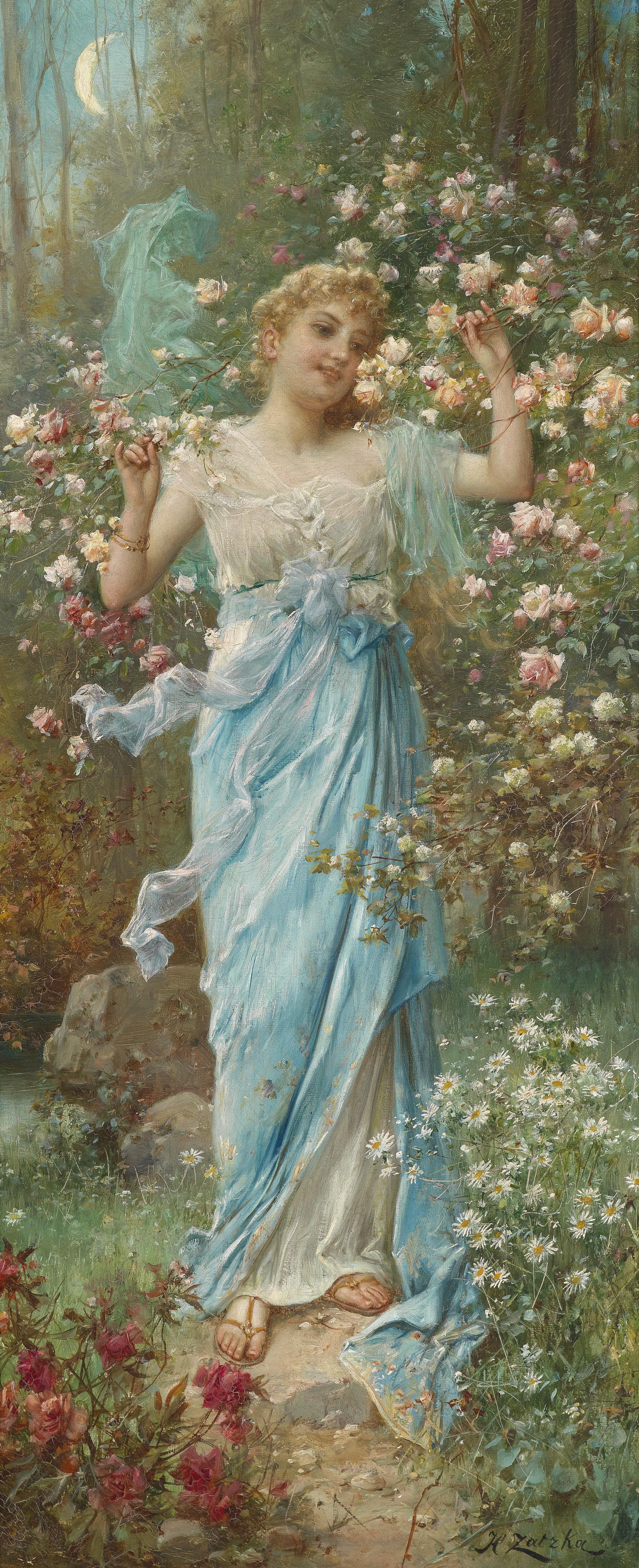
Blumenreigen, ca. 1900
