= St. Theresa Catholic Church and School =

Historic church and school in Crowley, Louisiana

- U.S. National Register of Historic Places
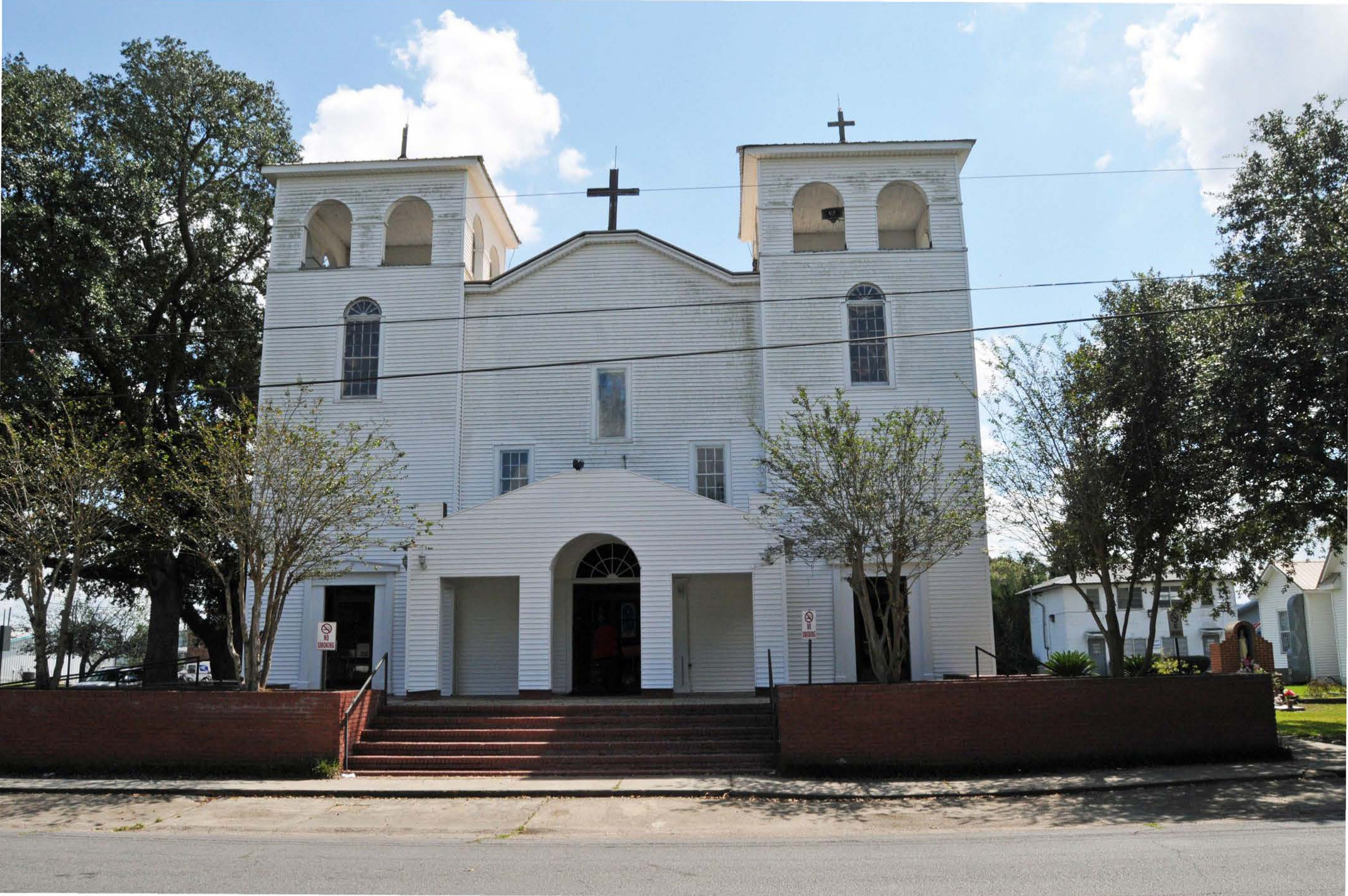

- Location within Louisiana Location within the United States
- Location: 417 West 3rd Street, Crowley, Louisiana
- Coordinates: 30.209877°N 92.376469°W
- Area: 1.4 acres (0.57 ha)
- Built: 1922–1957
- Architectural style: Classical Revival, American Craftsman, Modern Movement
- NRHP reference No.: 100002576
- Added to NRHP: June 19, 2018

St. Theresa Catholic Church and School is a historic church and former school complex in Crowley, Louisiana. Established in 1922, it served as a center of religious, educational, and community life for African Americans in Crowley during the era of segregation. The property was listed on the National Register of Historic Places in 2018.

The campus includes four contributing buildings—the church, rectory, sisters’ house, and former kindergarten building—which were used for both worship and education. From 1922 to 1971, the site operated as a Catholic school for Black students, providing one of the few educational opportunities available to African Americans in the area at the time.

== Description ==
St. Theresa Catholic Church and School occupies a 1.4-acre site just west of downtown Crowley in a residential neighborhood. The complex consists of five buildings, four of which are contributing: the church, rectory, sisters’ residence, and a former kindergarten building later used as a prayer chapel. A modern parish hall, constructed after 2005, is considered non-contributing.

The church, expanded to its present form by about 1931, features elements of Classical Revival design, including a symmetrical façade and twin bell towers. Alterations include the addition of vinyl siding and stained glass windows, though the overall design and form remain intact.

The rectory, built in 1922, is a two-story American Craftsman-style residence with a projecting front porch supported by columns and a central entrance flanked by windows. The sisters’ house, also constructed in 1922, is a T-shaped building with simple detailing and replacement windows.

The kindergarten building, completed in 1957, reflects more modern design and was used for classroom instruction. Together, these buildings retain sufficient integrity to convey their historic appearance and use.

== History ==
St. Theresa Catholic Church was established in 1920 as the first parish in Crowley serving African American Catholics. At the time, educational opportunities for Black students were limited, and no Catholic school existed for them locally.

Construction of the church began in 1922 and was completed later that year through community fundraising and volunteer labor during a period of economic hardship. The parish quickly expanded, and by 1923 the Sisters of the Holy Ghost had arrived to teach at the newly established school, which enrolled more than 200 students.

Classes were initially held in multiple buildings on the campus, including the church itself. Over time, additional facilities were constructed or expanded, including a two-story school building that later served as an auditorium and cafeteria. The campus continued to develop through the mid-20th century, reflecting the growth of the parish and school.

The church and school played a central role in the community. Contemporary reporting documented school activities, meetings, and community involvement tied to African American education in Crowley, including district school gatherings and educational programs.

Local newspaper coverage also reflected broader educational conditions and community organization among African Americans in Crowley during segregation, including school enrollment and civic efforts tied to education.

The school operated until 1971, when desegregation and consolidation within the Catholic school system led to its closure. Afterward, the parish continued to provide religious education programs for local youth.

== Significance ==
St. Theresa Catholic Church and School is significant under Criterion A in the areas of education and African American history. The complex represents the development of educational opportunities for Black students in Crowley during segregation, when access to schooling was limited and often unequal.

The school provided instruction from kindergarten through eighth grade and, for a period, offered high school-level education. It served as the primary Catholic educational institution for African Americans in the area and contributed to the advancement of many students who later became educators and professionals.

Newspaper accounts from the mid-20th century demonstrate the broader educational environment in which the school operated, including district coordination among Black schools and graduation programs that reflected increasing access to structured education.

In addition to its educational role, the church functioned as a central gathering place for the African American community. As noted in historical context studies, Black churches in Louisiana often served religious, social, and civic roles, a function fulfilled by St. Theresa throughout its history.

The period of significance extends from 1922, when the church and school were established, to 1971, when the school closed.

== See also ==
- National Register of Historic Places listings in Acadia Parish, Louisiana
