= Colorado Southern Railroad Depot =

Former railroad depot in Louisiana

- U.S. National Register of Historic Places
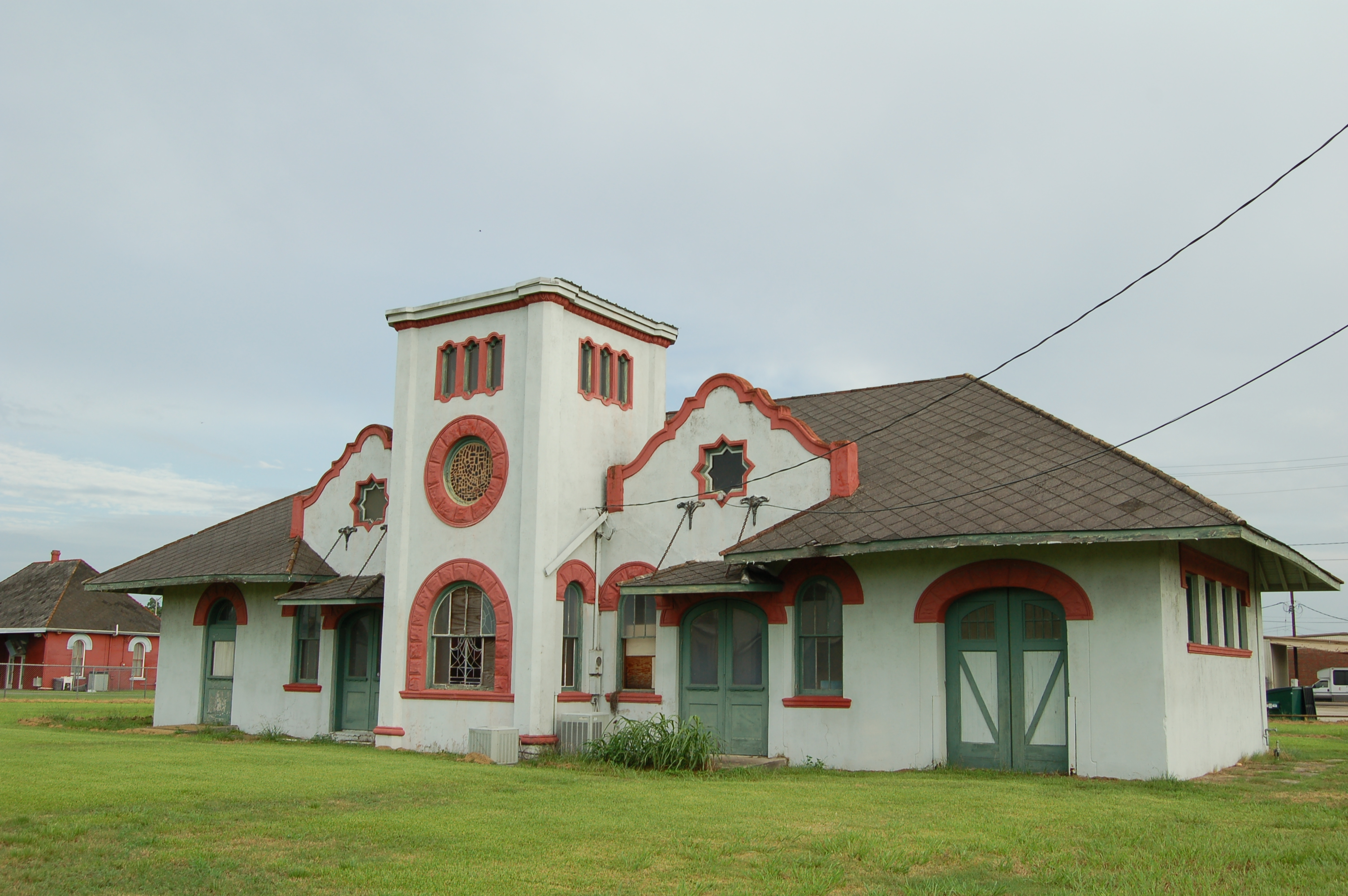

- Location within Louisiana
- Location: N. Avenue G and E. Front Street, Crowley, Louisiana
- Coordinates: 30°12′22″N 92°23′10″W
- Area: 0.7 acres (0.28 ha)
- Built: 1907
- Built by: W. C. Whitney
- Architect: C. H. Page
- Architectural style: Mission Revival
- NRHP reference No.: 80001693
- Added to NRHP: March 26, 1980

The Colorado Southern Railroad Depot, also known as the Old Missouri Pacific Railroad Depot, is a historic railroad depot located at the corner of North Avenue G and East Front Street in Crowley, Louisiana. It was listed on the National Register of Historic Places on March 26, 1980.

The depot is significant in the areas of architecture and transportation as an early Mission Revival–style railroad station and for its role in Crowley’s development as a regional transportation center in the early twentieth century.

== History ==
The Colorado Southern Railroad Depot was constructed in 1907, the same year the Eunice-to-Crowley rail line was completed as part of the Colorado Southern, New Orleans and Pacific Railroad. Later that year, the line became part of the Frisco Railroad system.

The railroad’s arrival enabled Crowley to develop as a milling and transportation center for southwest Louisiana’s rice industry.

The building was designed by architect C. H. Page of Austin, Texas, and constructed by contractor W. C. Whitney of Beaumont, at a reported cost of approximately $15,000.

The depot served both passenger and freight traffic and was a central transportation facility for the town. During peak rice production years, railroad traffic included trains with multiple engines and large numbers of freight cars loaded with rice.

By the 1930s, the building ceased operating as a passenger depot and was leased to American Legion Post No. 15 for one dollar per year, serving for several years as the local American Legion home. In 1978, the property was purchased by new owners who planned its restoration and adaptive reuse as a commercial showroom.

== See also ==
- National Register of Historic Places listings in Acadia Parish, Louisiana
