= Ellis Hoffpauir House =

- U.S. National Register of Historic Places
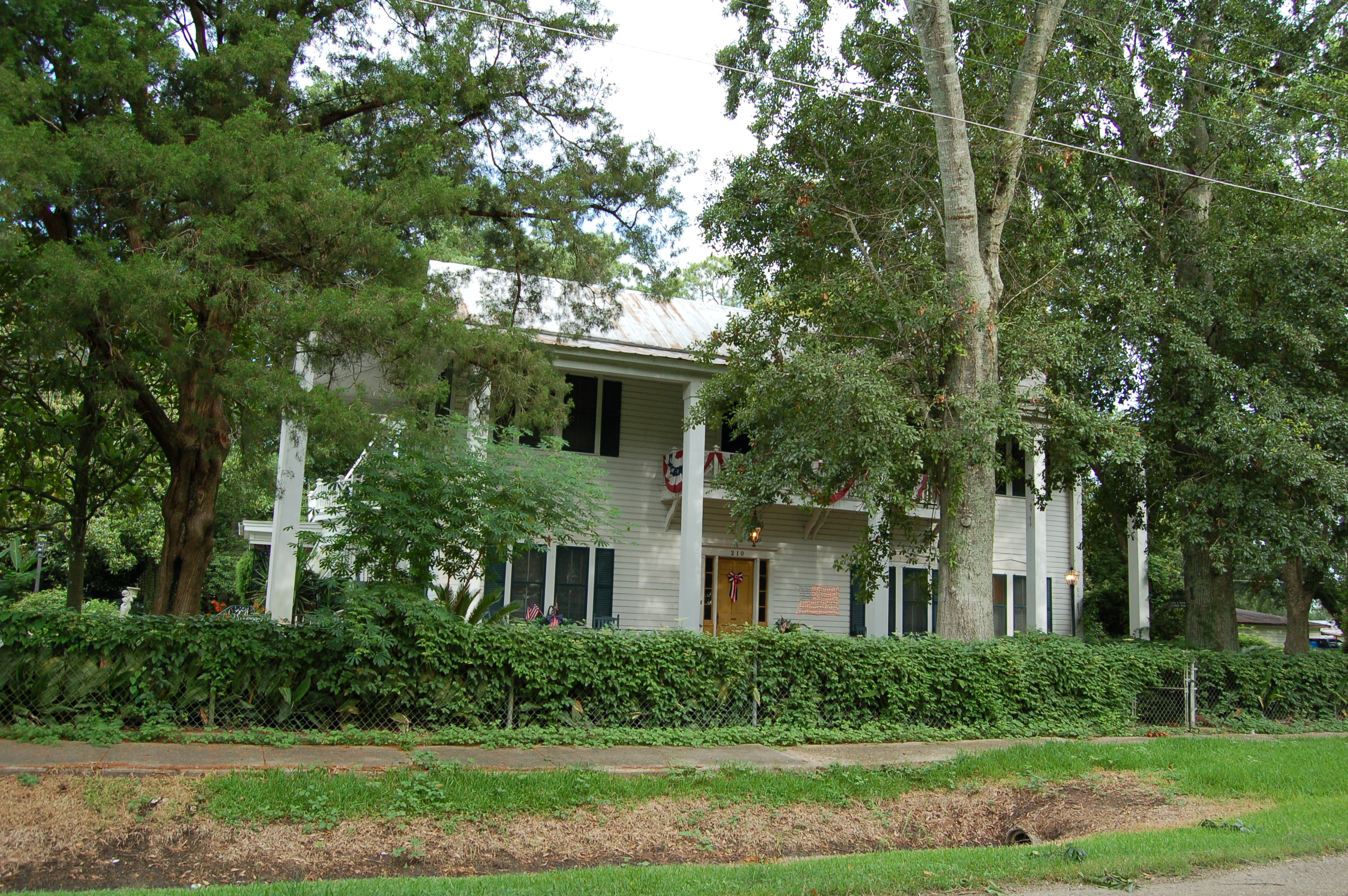

- Location within Louisiana
- Location: 210 LeBlanc St., Estherwood, Louisiana
- Coordinates: 30°10′55″N 92°27′51″W
- Area: 0.7 acres (0.28 ha)
- Built: 1905
- Architect: unknown
- Architectural style: Colonial Revival
- NRHP reference No.: 97000467
- Added to NRHP: June 5, 1997

Ellis Hoffpauir House, also known as Estherwood Manor, is a historic residence in Estherwood, Louisiana. It is listed on the National Register of Historic Places. At 210 LeBlanc Street, the two story wood frame neo-classical home has had various modifications and alterations during its history, including to its front columns.

Ellis Hoffpauir, who died in 1954, was president of the Zigler Dredgeboat Company in 1915. He was from a locally prominent family and worked in the rice business. Hoffpauir served as mayor of Estherwood from 1907 to 1912 and was a leader of the local school board. He was also active in the Methodist Episcopal Church.

== See also ==
- National Register of Historic Places listings in Acadia Parish, Louisiana
