= Fiske Theatre =

- U.S. National Register of Historic Places
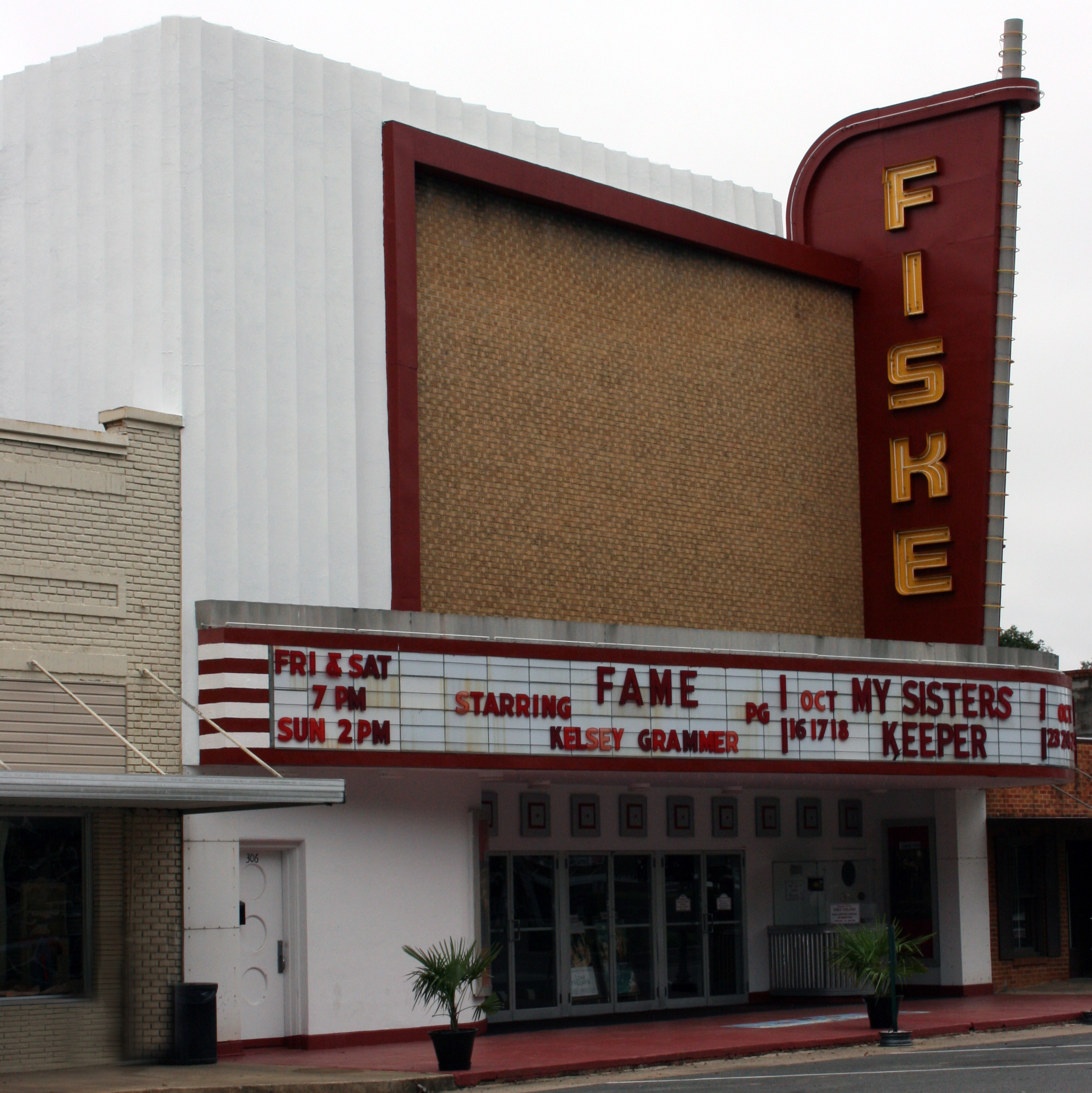

- Location within Louisiana Location within the United States
- Location: 306 E. Main St., Oak Grove, Louisiana
- Coordinates: 32°51′40″N 91°23′15″W
- Built: 1928; 1950
- Architectural style: Moderne
- NRHP reference No.: 13001130
- Added to NRHP: January 29, 2014

The Fiske Theatre in Oak Grove, Louisiana is a theatre that was built in 1928 and rebuilt in 1950.

It was rebuilt in 1950 into the Moderne style, to design by architect Bradford W. Stevens.

It was renovated in 2008.

It was listed on the U.S. National Register of Historic Places in 2014.
