= Joseph D. Bernard House =

Historic house in Louisiana, United States

- U.S. National Register of Historic Places
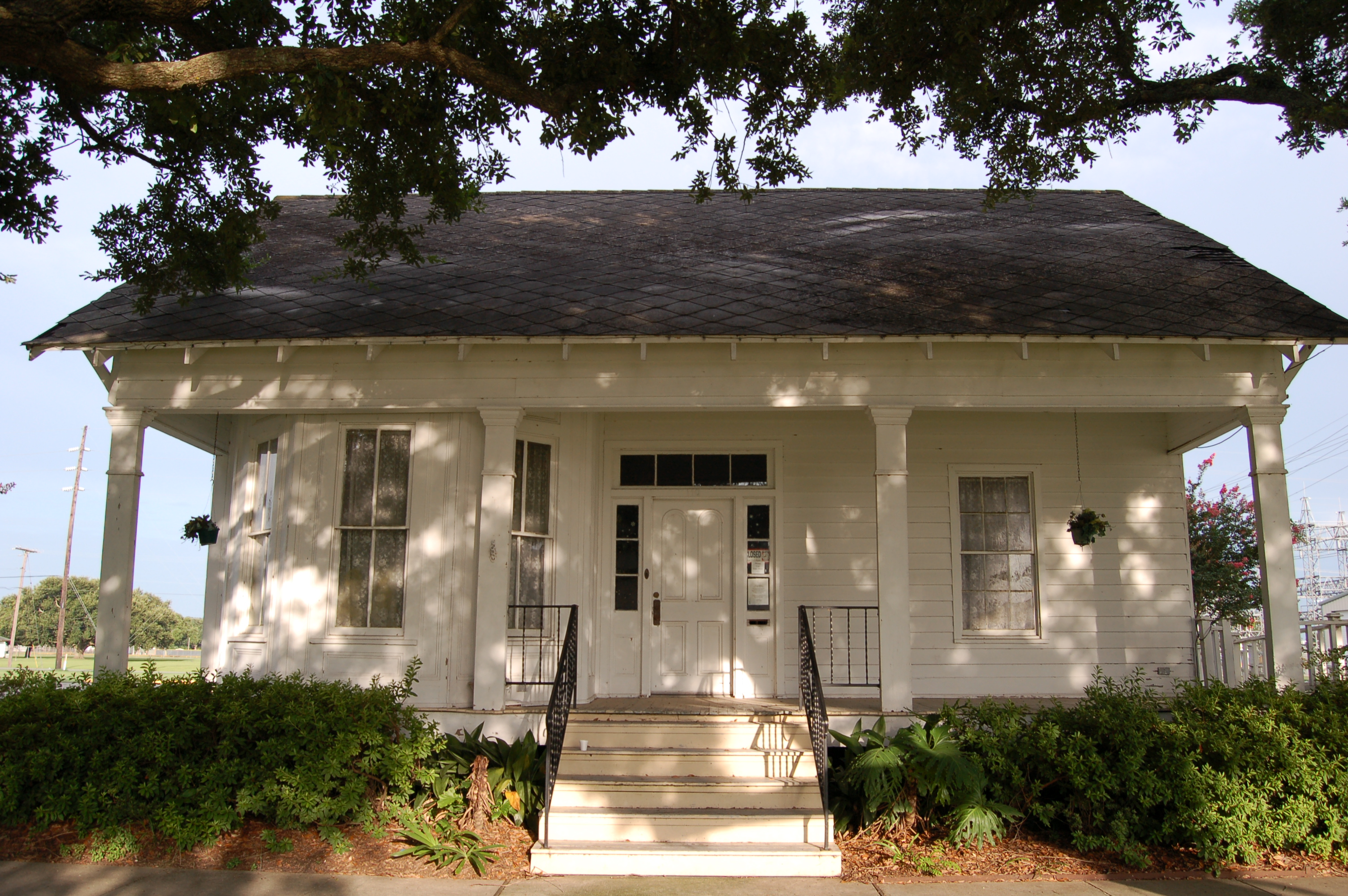
- The house in 2010

- Location within Louisiana
- Location: 1023 The Boulevard, Rayne, Louisiana
- Coordinates: 30°14′51″N 92°16′12″W
- Area: less than one acre
- Built: 1881
- Architectural style: Italianate
- NRHP reference No.: 01000119
- Added to NRHP: June 29, 2001

The Joseph D. Bernard House (also known as the Bernard-Bertrand House) is a historic house located in Rayne, Louisiana in the United States. The house is the former home of the first mayor of the city of Rayne, Joseph Bernard. As one of the oldest homes in Rayne. Today, the house serves as the Rayne Cultural Center.

The house was listed on the National Register of Historic Places on June 29, 2001.

== History ==
The house, built in 1881, is the former home of Joseph D. Bernard, co-founder and first mayor of Rayne, Louisiana, which was incorporated in 1883. The house was built on West South 1st Street. Bernard sold the house in 1918 to E.J. Bertrand, who ran the town power plant. Around 1999, the house was threatened to be demolished. That year, it was moved to its current location to avoid demolition.

== See also ==
- National Register of Historic Places listings in Acadia Parish, Louisiana
