= Crowley Historic District =

Historic district in Louisiana, United States

- U.S. National Register of Historic Places
- U.S. Historic district
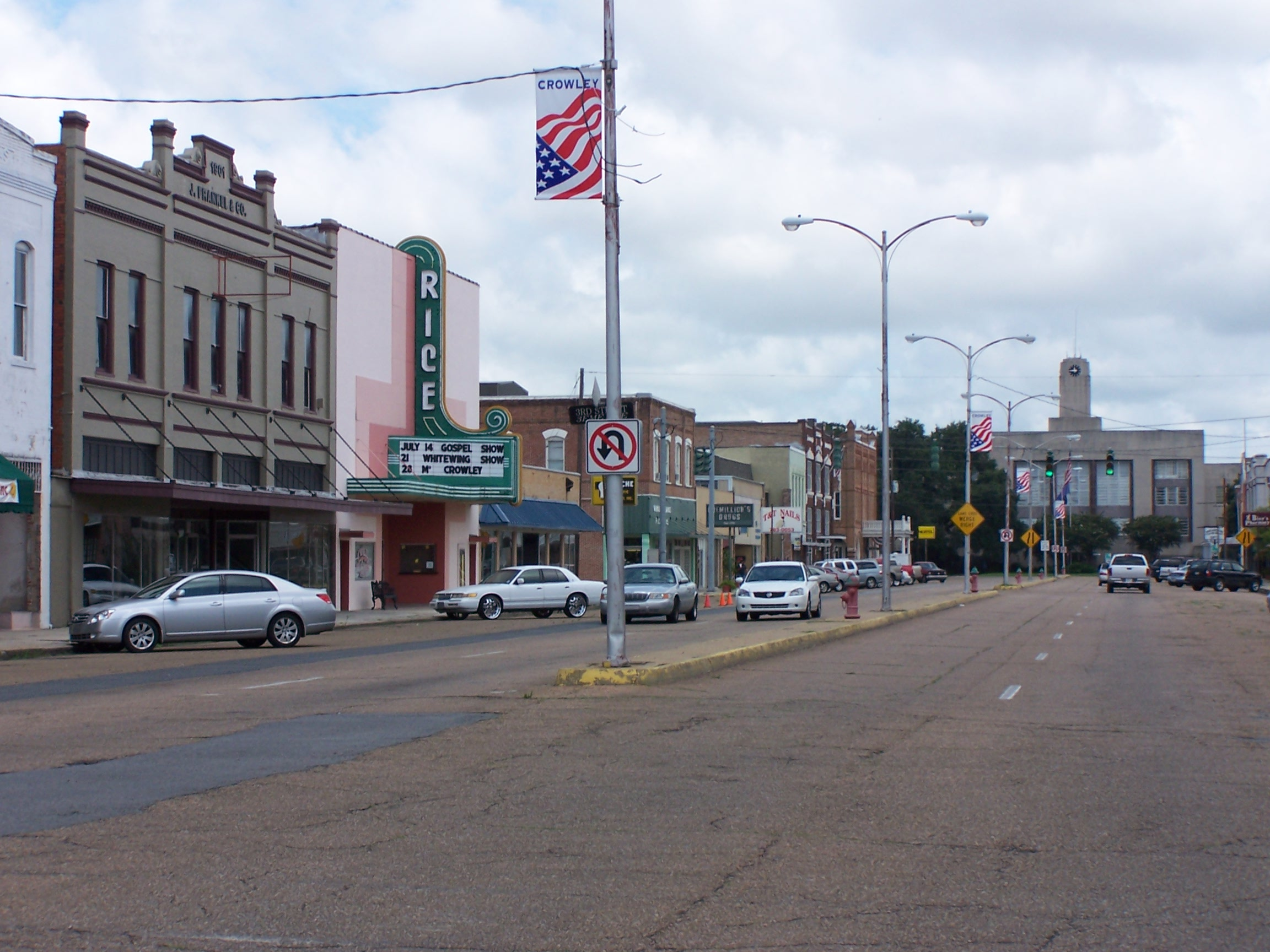

- Location within Louisiana
- Location: LA 13 and U.S. 90, Crowley, Louisiana
- Coordinates: 30°12′39″N 92°22′18″W
- Area: 210 acres (85 ha)
- Built: 1887
- Architectural style: Bungalow/craftsman, Queen Anne
- NRHP reference No.: 82002751 (original); 100009258 (increase)

Significant dates
- Added to NRHP: March 12, 1982
- Boundary increase: January 24, 2024

The Crowley Historic District, in Crowley in Acadia Parish, Louisiana, is a historic district which was listed on the National Register of Historic Places in 1982. The initial listing covered 210 acres (85 ha) and included 270 contributing buildings. The listing was enlarged in 2024.

It was deemed "significant in the area of architecture as the largest, most complete, architecturally pretentious and visually impressive example of a late-nineteenth to early-twentieth century town in a 7 parish area. These include the parishes of Acadia, Lafayette, Jefferson, Davis, Allen, Evangeline, St. Landry and Vermilion. It is the only historic town in this region in which the residential area and the commercial area are both well preserved and impressive."

The 210 acres (85 ha) area historic district comprises a total of 266 buildings constructed between 1887 and 1931.

It includes Bungalow/craftsman and Queen Anne architecture.

The district includes the eastern part of downtown Crowley, and is roughly bounded by East 6th Street, North Avenue M, East 2nd Street, South Avenue H, East Ash Street, South Avenue G, East Mill Street and North Avenue F.

It includes one seven-story early skyscraper building, the First National Bank Building (1920) on Parkerson, which stands out from the usual two- to three-story scale of buildings in its area.
