= Joseph Bernard (sculptor) =

French sculptor

Joseph Bernard (1866, Vienne, Isère – 1931) was a modern classical French sculptor, featured on the frontispiece of Elie Faure's 1927 survey of modern art, "Spirit of Forms". Bernard was trained at the École des Beaux-Arts in the atelier of Pierre-Jules Cavelier.

== Gallery ==
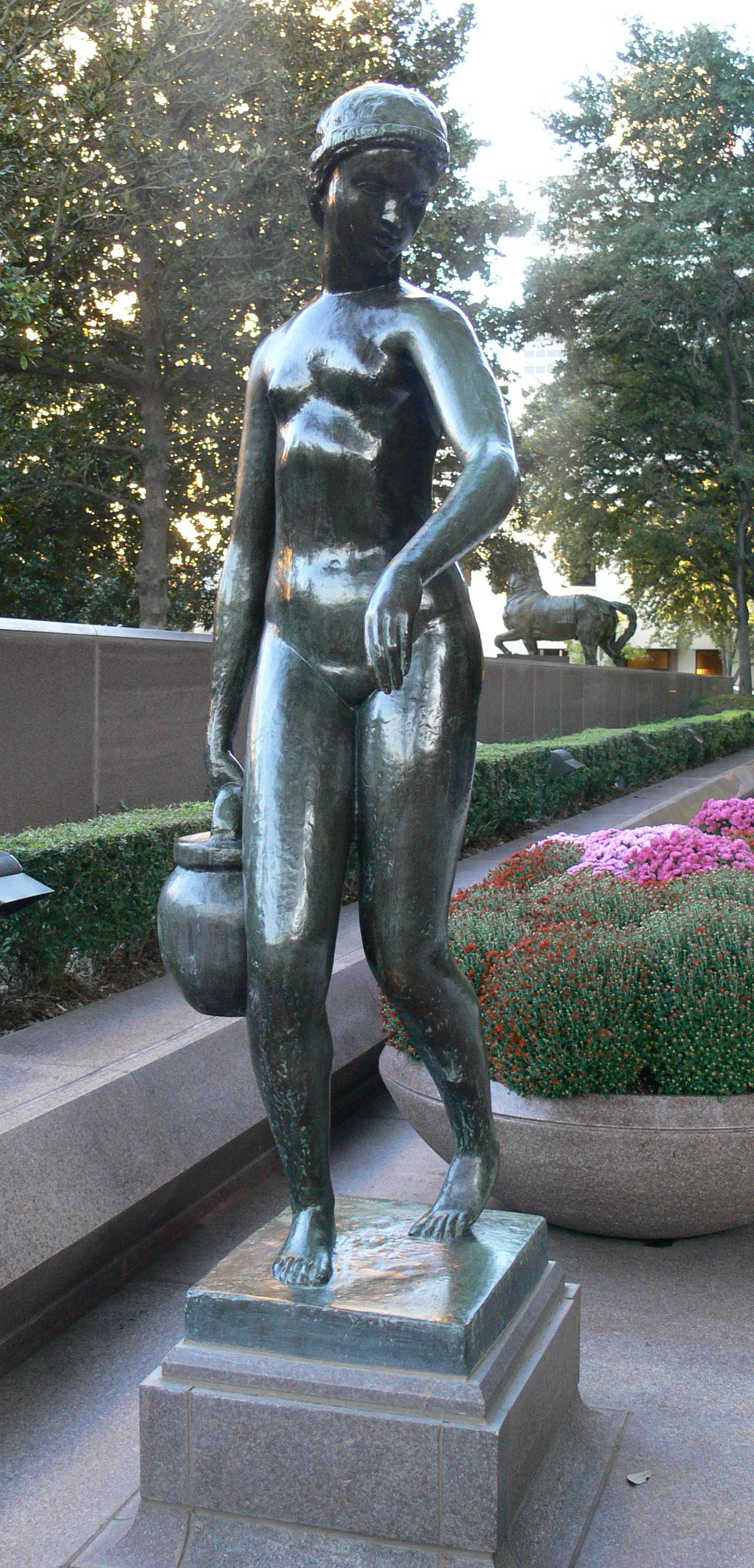
Young Girl Carrying Water
Crow Center, Dallas

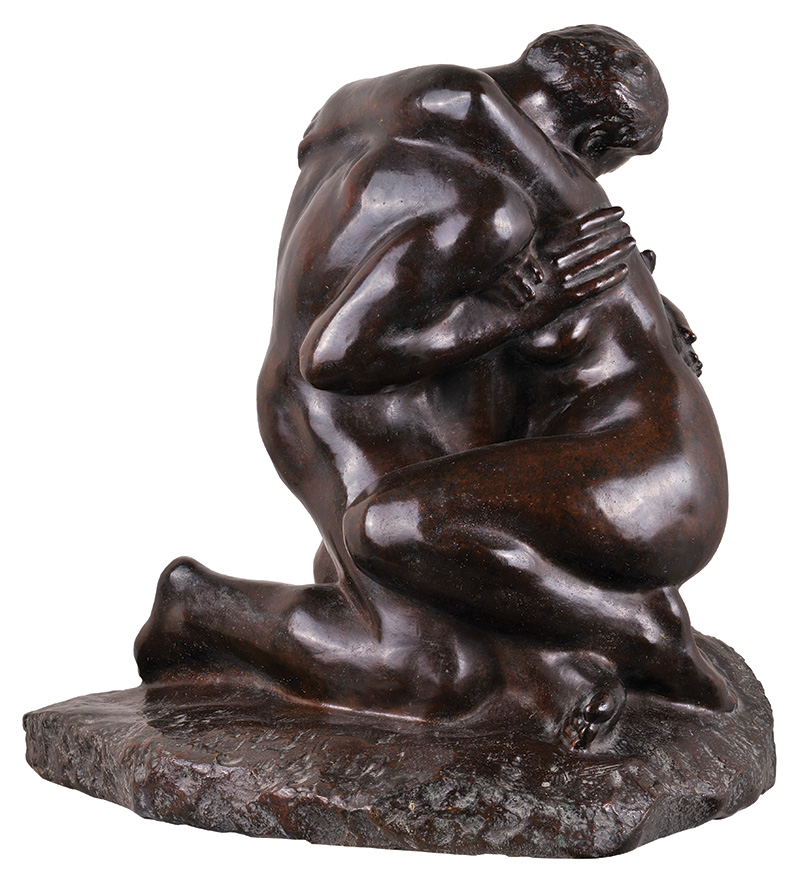
Kiss

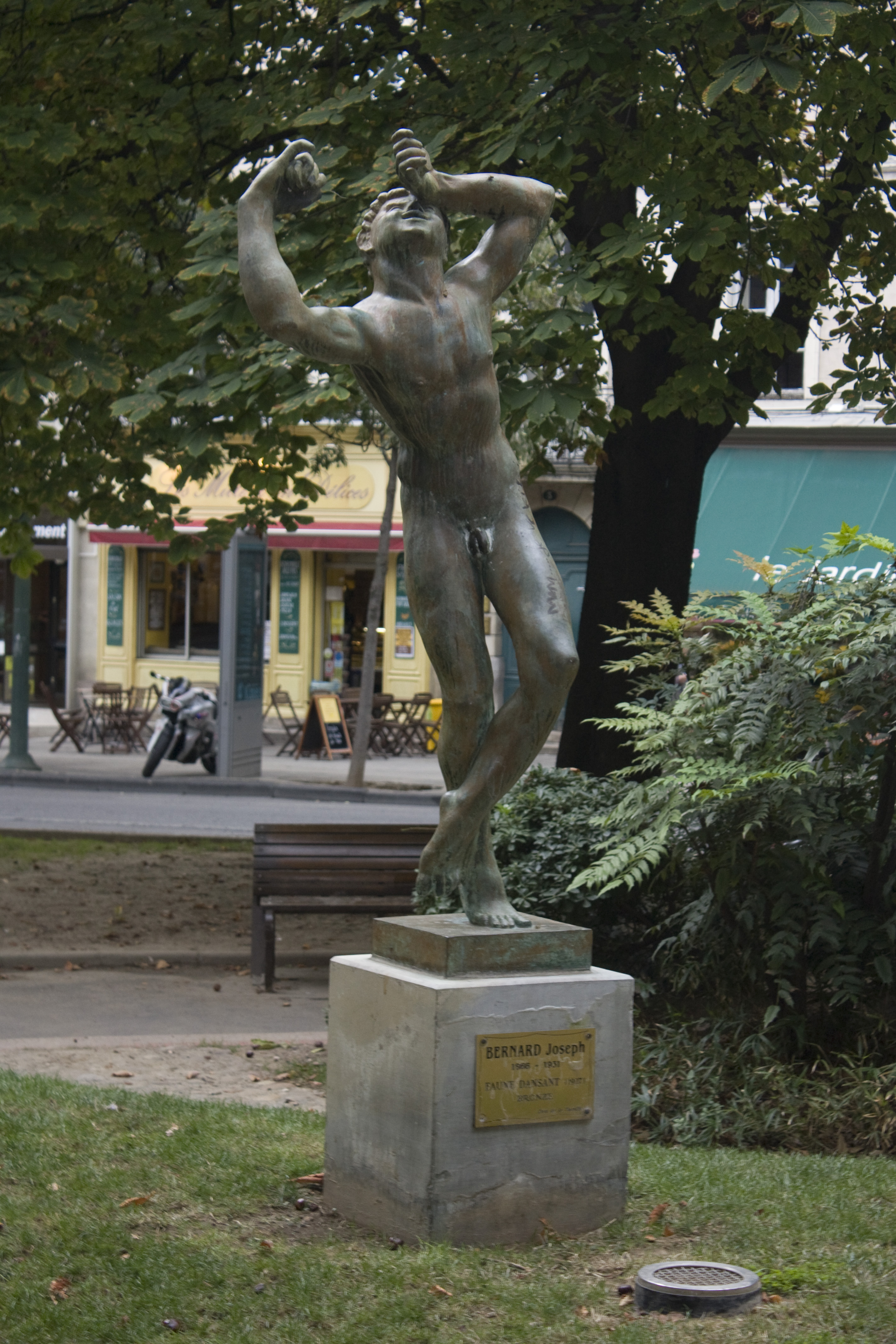
Faune Dansant

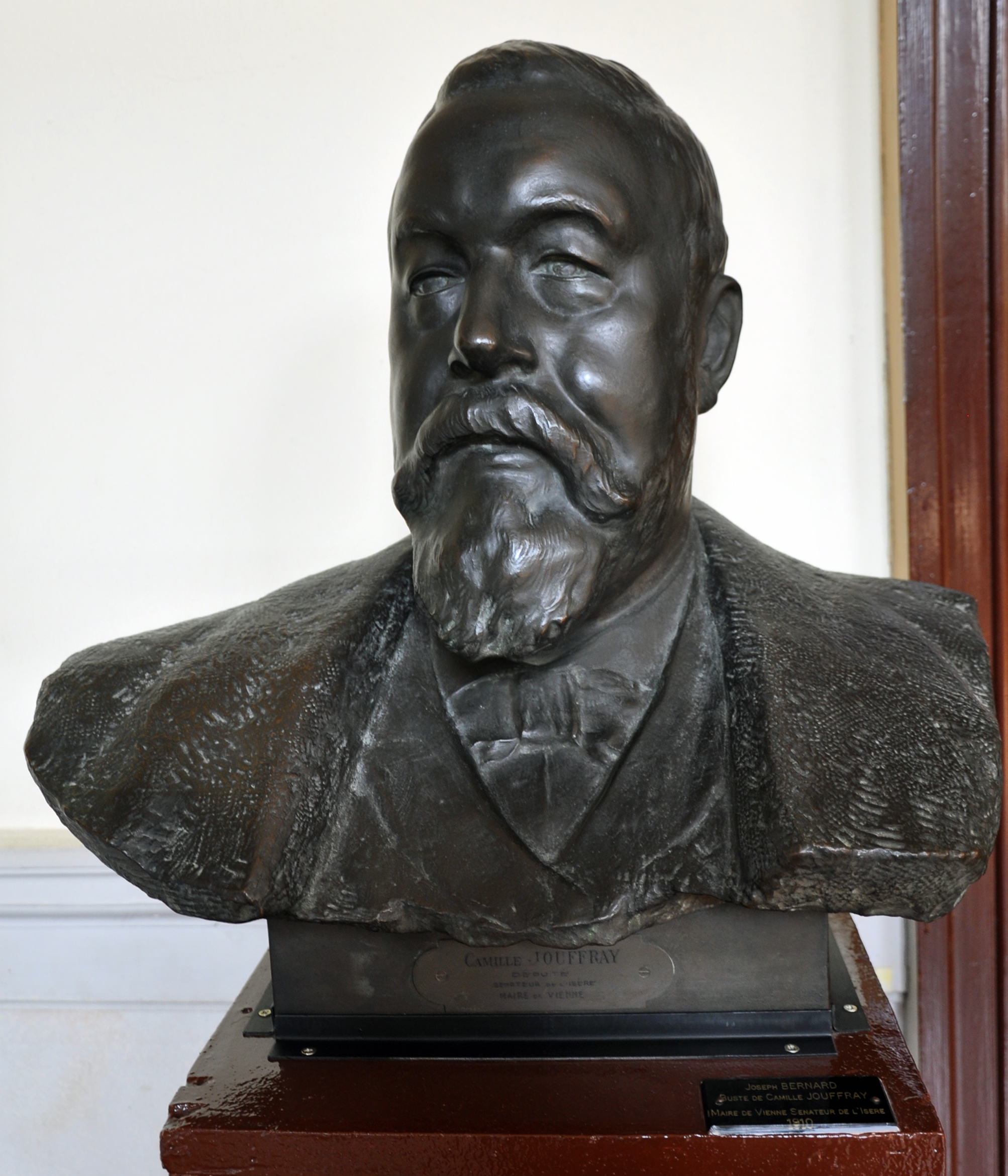
Camille Jouffray

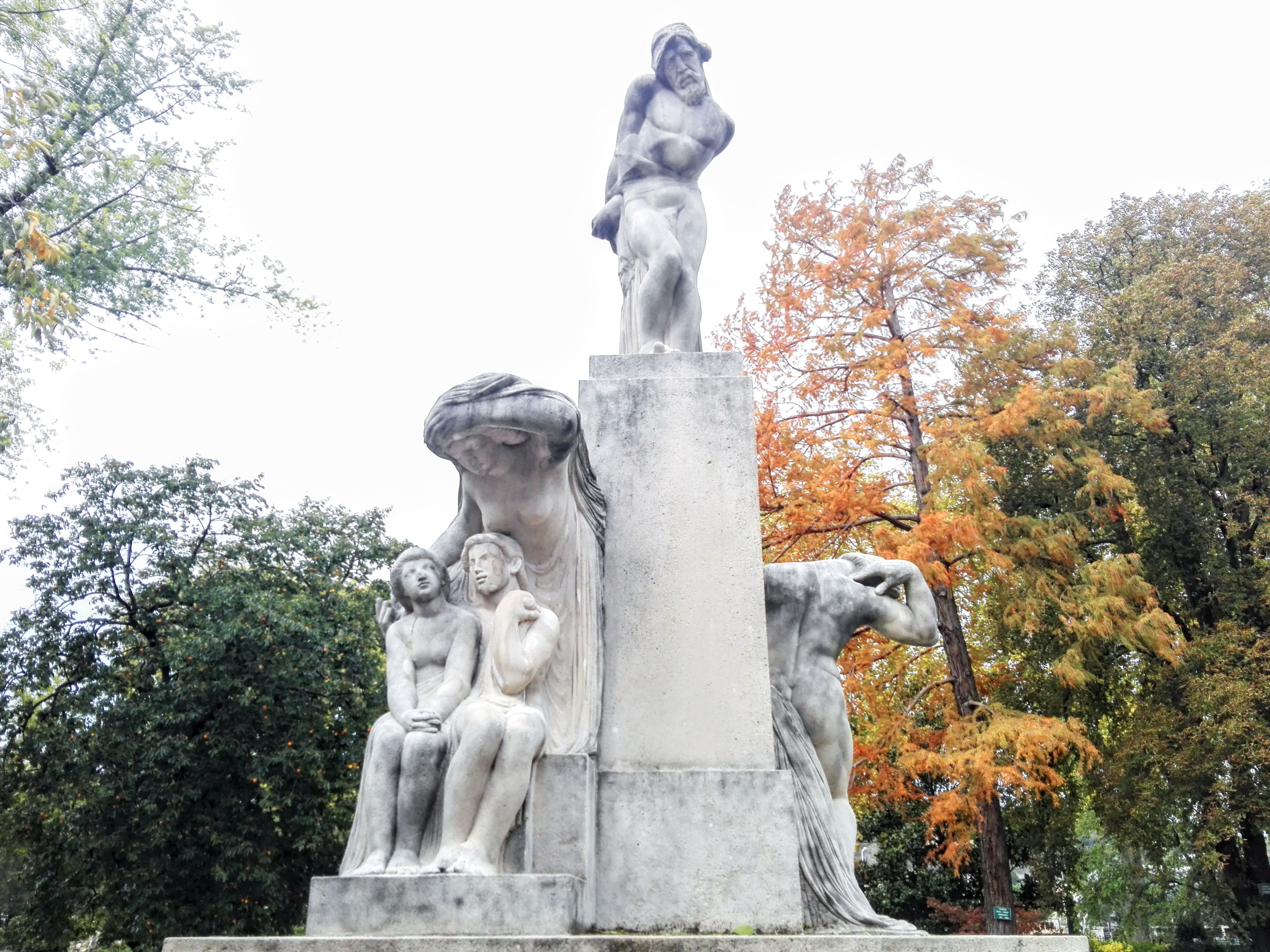
Monument to Michel Servet (1908-1911), Vienne (Isère), public garden

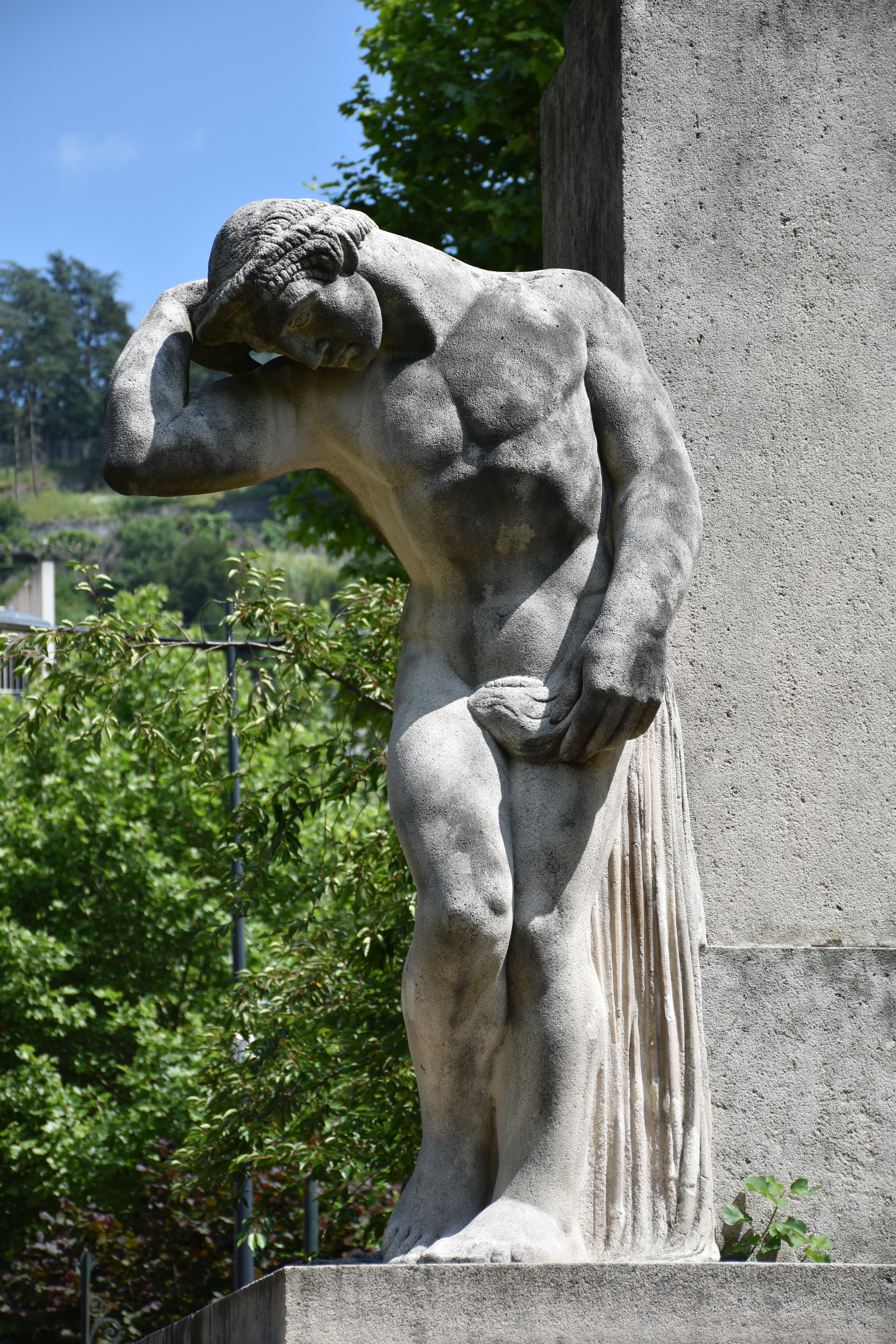
Remorse from the Monument to Michel Servet
