= List of Louisiana state high school football champions =

Louisiana high school sports award

Allstate Sugar Bowl LHSAA Prep Classic
- Allstate Sugar Bowl LHSAA Prep Classic Presented by Allstate Sugar Bowl and New Orleans Saints
- Prep Classic
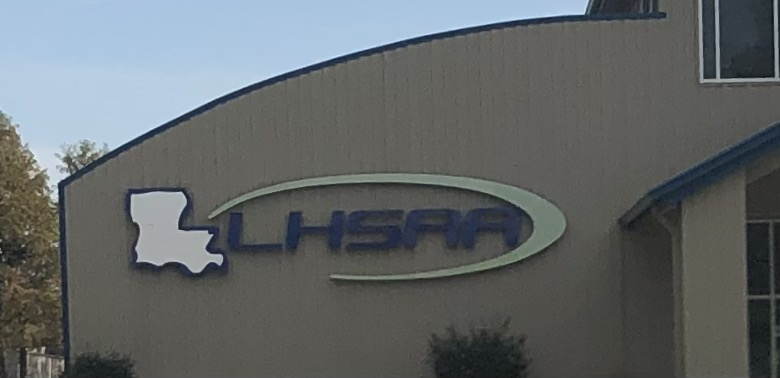
- Stadium: Caesars Superdome (1981–2004, 2006–2019, 2021–Present)
- Location: New Orleans, Louisiana, U.S. (1981–2004, 2006–2019, 2021–Present)
- Previous locations: Independence Stadium, Shreveport (2005); Cougar Stadium, Lafayette (2019); Yulman Stadium, New Orleans (2019, 2021); Cajun Field, Lafayette (2019, 2021); Harry Turpin Stadium, Natchitoches (2020)
- Operated: 1981–Present

Sponsors
- Gatorade (1986–1999); Nokia Sugar Bowl (2000–2005); State Farm (2006–2013); Ochsner (2021–2023); Allstate Sugar Bowl (2014–2019, 2026–Present)

Former names
- Superdome Classic (1981–1985); Gatorade Superdome Classic (1986–1999); Nokia Sugar Bowl Prep Classic (2000–2005); State Farm Prep Classic (2006–2010); LHSAA/State Farm Prep Classic (2011–2013); Allstate Sugar Bowl/LHSAA Prep Classic (2014–2019); Ochsner/LHSAA Prep Classic (2021–2023); LHSAA Prep Classic (2020, 2024–2025)

Louisiana

Below is a list of Louisiana state high school football champions sanctioned by various organizations since they began holding formal high school football state championship games in Louisiana in 1909, as well as informal state championship games held since 1907. High schools in the state are currently divided between the Louisiana High School Athletic Association, a small number of independent private schools, and those private schools that choose to compete across state lines for Midsouth Association of Independent Schools honors. In the past schools also competed under the auspices of the Louisiana Interscholastic Athletic and Literary Organization, the Louisiana Independent School Association, the Louisiana Christian School Athletic Association, and the Association of Christian Educators of Louisiana.

== Background ==
Although numerous late-season games are known to have been hastily scheduled between prominent teams and informally dubbed "state championship" games back in high school football's early years, these games generally based their authority solely on general acclamation and were held without formal, independent third-party sponsors. Several early games are notable exceptions to this, but even then these games usually featured a home team as a draw; neutral playing sites may have given this series of games a stronger sense of legitimacy.

For what it is worth, in high school football's earliest days multiple New Orleans-area regional organizations—that were at times administered by Tulane University—came and went that could have theoretically also determined de facto state champions based sheerly on the lack of existing teams in other parts of the state. The first of these organizations, the Interscholastic Football League, was sponsored by the Tulane Athletic Association and began play for the city's pennant during the 1895 campaign.

== Former championship selectors ==
=== Unsponsored state championship games (1907–1929) ===
In high school football's early years, a number of prominent schools added late season games against other strong teams and claimed that these games would be for the "state championship." In some cases a third team that felt unfairly left out of the process would then challenge the winner of that state championship contest to a game of their own shortly afterward, essentially meaning that there would be a second state championship game that very same season—effectively creating a de facto early form of playoffs, just without the sponsorship of a controlling legal authority that could award a trophy. In 1914 and 1917, there were three or even four games that had been designated as state championships, as the annual State Fair of Louisiana in Shreveport and National Farm and Live Stock Show in New Orleans respectively had staged games for the title that had been considered too early in the season by some schools to truly settle the issue of crowning a champion.

The first ever champion, Jefferson College of Convent, had a campus that consisted of a high school, junior college, and college. At the time, the school regularly scheduled a mixture of high school and university-level club, junior varsity, and varsity teams. It defeated Boys High (later called Warren Easton) of New Orleans in 1907 for the first high school state title, by a score of 27–0.

=== Louisiana High School Rally (1909) ===
In 1909, the state rally for interscholastic academic and athletic competitions, hosted annually by Louisiana State University, sponsored a state championship game, complete with a trophy. The hometown school, Baton Rouge High, defeated Boys High in the game, 17–5.

=== Calcasieu–Louisiana Fair (1910) ===
The first annual Calcasieu–Louisiana Fair scheduled a high school football game between the hometown Lake Charles High team and Boys High, billing it as being for the state championship. The game was a very successful draw, as 3,000 of the fair's 10,000 attendees watched LCHS' 17–11 victory.

=== State Fair of Louisiana (1914–1915) ===
The Shreveport-based State Fair of Louisiana, which was known to host football games in conjunction with the fair—the Louisiana State Fair Classic for college teams, for example—also sponsored a series of games involving high school teams in the 1910s. Although earliest teams do not appear to have been billed as facing off for the state crown, the fair began to promote later games as being for a formal state championship. However, even these games did not necessarily resolve the issue of a true state champion—and indeed may have even actually helped generate further controversy—since the annual fair always scheduled its championship game participants well before the end of the high school football season (meaning that the games may have only reflected the best teams from the first half of the season). Also, the local team from Shreveport High (later called C. E. Byrd) was usually invited to play as the representative of North Louisiana in the state fair's game, which was a particular concern in 1916 when SHS had a down year. Also, the newly-created LHSAA was largely rendering it obsolete any way.

=== Times–Picayune (1915) ===
The New Orleans Times–Picayune sponsored a game (for the state championship) between two city schools, Easton and New Orleans Jesuit. The two schools had tied 6–6 earlier in the season, so the game was seen as an opportunity to both break the tie and to serve as a fundraiser for the newspaper's Doll and Toy Fund drive for needy children's Christmas presents at the same time. However, Jesuit's starting quarterback had been injured in the first game and was not able to recover in time to participate in the second game. Easton won, 13–12.

What set this state championship game apart from the state fair's game earlier that season is that this one included a private school, the first time that a private school had been allowed to compete for a state crown. Easton had actually approached Shreveport High, the state fair's champion, about playing earlier in the season but was turned down. It is not immediately clear what, if anything, of Easton's offer to play was considered objectionable to SHS.

This game was a forerunner to the annual "Toy Bowl" that the Times–Picayune began sponsoring annually in 1933 to raise money for its Doll and Toy Fund—and was occasionally held in conjunction with state championship games.

=== National Farm and Live Stock Show and Live Stock Buyers' Convention (1917) ===
The 1917 National Farm and Live Stock Show was held in New Orleans, complete with a relatively early-season state championship football game between Easton and Minden High that was won by Easton, 44–7.

=== Spalding's Official Foot Ball Guide (1918) ===
Despite the various wartime shortages and Spanish Flu-related travel restrictions and disbandments of teams, apparently enough games did manage to be held in 1918 that Easton would later be described as state champions by a national publication. Otherwise, the new LHSAA passed on designating its own champion, and a proposed, unsponsored championship game between Easton and Winnfield never got past the planning stages.

=== Texas–Louisiana Football Series (1922–1923) ===
In 1922 and 1923, attempts were made to pair the state champions of Louisiana and Texas in a postseason event.

In 1922, however, without any official explanation, the LHSAA issued a simple statement that it would not endorse any playoff games or otherwise declare a champion for that season (speculation was that the primary playoff contenders were just simply too far spread out geographically from one another to make it worth the effort, especially since they had fared only modestly better over the course of the season than the non-contenders had. With no named LHSAA champion, as far as the Texas–Louisiana Series organizers were concerned, Shreveport High (which had managed to beat, or tie, all of its in-state opponents; its only loss was to an out-of-state team) should be considered the champion of Louisiana for the sake of the game.

The following year, the LHSAA declined to recognize the already-scheduled state championship game between Homer and Morgan City, and declared Morgan City its champion instead. The game was played any way, with Homer winning. Homer was then designated as Louisiana's representative for the planned New Year's Day face-off between the Louisiana and Texas champions at Centenary College, under the proposed backing of the Shreveport Chamber of Commerce.

=== Louisiana Interscholastic Athletic and Literary Association (1936–1949) ===
The Louisiana Interscholastic Athletic and Literary Association (LIALA) was created for African American high schools in 1935, with the merging of two regional interscholastic organizations and the backing of Southern University. It sponsored its first football championship in 1936.

=== Magnolia Bowl (1940) ===
An early power in black high school football was McKinley of Baton Rouge, which included a stretch with Eddie Robinson at quarterback. After a McKinley loss in 1941, the game was described by a newspaper account as "the Panthers' first defeat in thirteen years."

McKinley initially declined to join the fledgling LIALA, instead retaining an independent status that would allow it to continue scheduling a slate of elite teams from the surrounding states of Texas, Arkansas, and Mississippi. Despite the distinguished honor of not losing to any of these regional powers during this era, a downside was that McKinley was also not able to acquire any trophies to permanently display in its case since it was not actually a member of an athletic association that awarded any.

In 1939, the Capital City Free Workers offered to host a black state championship game that would include McKinley matched against the LIALA championship game's winner (Bogalusa Central) in a fundraiser for the local Lions Club. In turn, its winner would host a black national championship game on New Year's Day. Ultimately, McKinley ended up opting out of postseason play, leaving Central the overall state champion of record by default and ending any hopes of holding a national championship game.

By the next season McKinley had given in and joined the LIALA but was still ineligible for its state crown because the Panthers did not play enough conference games. The media described that team as being unscored upon and the program as a whole as undefeated going back eight seasons as well as heading into the 1940 postseason. This time McKinley accepted its invitation to the Magnolia Bowl, which was to be played against unbeaten Monroe Colored High.

McKinley was finally able to capture the title of the LIALA as a member in 1942.

=== Louisiana Interscholastic Athletic and Literary Organization (1950–1969) ===
In 1950, after the LIALA rechristened itself as the "Louisiana Interscholastic Athletic and Literary Organization" (LIALO), it openly worked with the LHSAA to restructure itself from a coordinating body into more of a governing body, with stronger rules and enforcement power. However, by 1951 the LIALO had already been accused by the principal of Winnfield Winn Training (later called Pinecrest) of "trying to purge certain members of vocal opposition to friendship politics;" he threatened to join with the other "purged" members to create a new high school athletic association. The LIALO was again accused by him in 1956 of selectively enforcing its rules with a tilt toward the southern part of the state, and thirty North Louisiana schools attempted to break away from the LIALO to form the "Louisiana Secondary School Association" as an alternative, competing organization. During the years 1965 and 1966, a tragic but also inspiring story arose out of DeQuincy as four members of their small, Class A-sized Grand Avenue team died in a car wreck just two hours after returning from winning the state championship game over Good Pine, 27–0. However, the team was able to pull together the next year and persevere as repeat-champs by an even larger margin of victory over Good Pine, this time 56–6. At the end of the 1967–68 school year, New Orleans St. Augustine left the LIALO to join the LHSAA as part of the process of desegregation efforts within the New South. Further accelerating the disbanding of the LIALO was the 1968 revelation that the association had never formally incorporated and was therefore technically not even a legally-recognized entity under Louisiana law—leading to questions over who exactly was running the organization and what they were using its membership fees for. This concern came to light when H. C. Ross of Crowley attempted to challenge the LIALO in court over one of its rulings but was then informed that there was no such organization to serve lawsuit papers to; Ross promptly withdrew from the LIALO and applied for admission to the LHSAA. By early December 1969, a rumor spread that the LIALO would disband with its remaining members joining the LHSAA—this, despite the difficulties that St. Aug faced when transitioning over to LHSAA rules (19 football players quickly lost eligibility). Furthermore, what ended up being the last-ever LIALO state championship game was delayed a full month until mid-January 1970, as it "had been plagued with protests, courts suits, and counter-protests." Some dialogue began between the two organizations and, by the end of the 1969–70 school year, all remaining LIALO members had moved over to the LHSAA. The LHSAA is apparently in possession of few, if any, archival records from the organization, and surviving records are otherwise scarce. In addition, in 2016 the LHSAA's offices in Baton Rouge received major damage from a flood, which could have potentially destroyed any remaining records. It is not immediately clear if Southern, which helped sustain the organization, has retained any documents concerning the LIALO (Southern appears to have at least remained distant enough from the LIALO over that time period to have avoided being pulled directly into its aforementioned legal disputes). However, there is at least some LIALO-related paperwork among the Charles B. Roussève papers maintained by the Amistad Research Center at Tulane.

=== Louisiana Prep Grid Standard (1957–1959) ===
Lee L. Meade, Sr., a Minnesotan who would later become sports editor of The Denver Post and then help form the American Basketball Association, World Hockey Association, World TeamTennis, Major League Volleyball, and International Basketball Association sports leagues, briefly worked in Louisiana with the Lafayette Daily Advertiser and the Lake Charles American Press. While in Lake Charles he established a sports rating system that could both rank LHSAA teams and also determine possible point spreads of upcoming games, similar to what the Dunkel System and Jeff Sagarin do for various sports, most notably college football. His mathematical system, dubbed the "Louisiana Prep Grid Standard" (LPGS), was considered quite accurate by his journalistic peers. It correctly projected the results of 80% of the 1957 playoff games, including 100% of the four championship games. One of the LPGS' more notable game predictions in 1959 was that one team would beat another by a seemingly absurd point margin of 74 points; the team actually ended up winning by 75 points. In January 1960 the Baton Rouge Morning Advocate drew up a man-made postseason ranking of the top ten LHSAA Class AAA teams from 1959 to compare with the findings of the LPGS mathematical system; the two rankings ended up very similar, as all ten teams were the same with few noteworthy disagreements in the order of those ten. At the time, the Associated Press only ranked the LHSAA's Class AAA, while Meade ranked teams in all of the classifications of the LHSAA. While the season's final AP poll was announced before the LHSAA playoffs, Meade's final rankings were issued after the playoffs—and while usually matching the actual LHSAA champions, did occasionally deviate from them, much to the benefit of several Baton Rouge-area schools (and the dismay of his local readers from Lake Charles High). Baton Rouge Istrouma, for example, won all LHSAA Class AAA titles between 1955 and 1959 except for 1958—but was then able to grab the top spot in Class AAA in the LPGS' 1958 final postseason ratings as well.

=== Morning Advocate (1959) ===
Though the Baton Rouge Morning Advocate was normally content to just let the LHSAA teams determine the championships among themselves within the framework of the playoffs, shortly after the 1959 season they did issue a one-time postseason ranking of the top ten Class AAA teams to compare with the results of the Louisiana Prep Grid Standard mathematical system. The two rankings ended up "almost identical" with the same exact ten teams, although in a slightly different arrangement.

=== Louisiana Independent School Association (1970–1991) ===
In 1970 twenty private schools, many of which could probably be classified as segregation academies, formed the "Louisiana Independent School Association" (LISA). By 1971 LISA had increased its membership to 54 schools. It also included at least one Arkansas school during its existence. When LISA disbanded many of its member schools joined the Midsouth Association of Independent Schools (known at the time as the Mississippi Private School Association), with some joining the LHSAA (the only past LISA champions to join the LHSAA were Riverside Academy of Reserve, and False River Academy of New Roads).

Below is a listing of all LISA football champions.

=== Louisiana Christian School Athletic Association (2006–2011) ===
The Louisiana Christian School Athletic Association (LCSAA) began competition during the 1981–82 school year, with formal championship competition between its 24 member schools coming during the 1984–85 term. Although very similar in nature to the make-up of the LISA, it differed slightly in that LISA schools were not necessarily parochial schools while LCSAA schools always were. Regardless, LISA schools did have a tendency to be Protestant-based academies, concentrated within Protestant-majority North Louisiana; LCSAA schools—also largely Protestant academies—were more often clustered in Louisiana's predominantly Catholic Acadiana region, giving its schools much fewer potential students to draw from. With smaller schools than the LISA, it initially could not sustain eleven-man football programs (although it did manage to foster six-man and eight-man football competition). It did eventually attempt to add eleven-man football as a league sport for the 2006 season, starting with four teams.

=== Association of Christian Educators of Louisiana (2012–2014) ===
In 2012 the LCSAA was "reformed" as the "Association of Christian Educators of Louisiana" (ACEL). Although it had more than 30 member schools in 2013, most did not field football teams. It actually featured two "divisions" for football, however, including one for eight-man football that contained 7 schools. However, after three seasons it no longer had enough schools sustaining eleven-man football teams to warrant sanctioning further championship competition and, following multiple seasons, had not resumed sponsoring the sport. However, with five schools still fielding eight-man teams, the ACEL has been able to continue fostering competition for that particular form of the sport.

== Current championship selectors ==
=== Louisiana High School Athletic Association (since 1916) ===
The Louisiana High School Athletic Association (LHSAA) was founded in 1915 to serve as an interscholastic governing organization for white public high schools (since private schools were not included, a similar, competing regional organization called the "Prep School Athletic Association" was formed for New Orleans-area private schools later on that same year). Additional discussions continued on into 1916 for improving and strengthening the new body (including the drafting of a constitution). Among the earliest controversies that the fledgling LHSAA would be called upon to resolve were competing claims to the 1916 football crown. Shreveport High's regular season shutout loss to Minden High suddenly made the state fair's previously scheduled game between SHS and Easton seem far less useful for determining the state championship. MHS and Easton quickly attempted to fit a replacement match into their existing schedules, but no firm playing date could be arranged; the LHSAA ended up siding with Easton's claim to the title. The LHSAA also faced much more serious issues in its early years, with older students enrolling in the military for the war effort and with Spanish Flu victims in general. Numerous teams were disbanded and games canceled during the outbreak, and a travel ban greatly limited the remaining active teams.

The association split into classifications based upon enrollment numbers in 1921. Private schools (1929) and schools with enrollments that were entirely African American (1968) were later extended membership relatively without incident (integrated schools, however, had never been expressly prevented from joining). The association also survived two major attempts at schisms. In 1946 the stronger public school football programs of the then-top class (Class AA) attempted to form a "Big 12" that would play a round-robin schedule to determine its champion instead of using the playoff system. After being decisively outvoted at the next LHSAA meeting, the Big 12 was not particularly forthcoming about its future plans. One of the private school representatives at the meeting likened the effort to having "bordered on fascism" for acting without private schools. In 2013 the association moved schools that had selective student body enrollments into separate divisions; the move was driven by the principal of Winnfield Senior High to minimize the impact of successful private schools John Curtis Christian of River Ridge and Evangel Christian of Shreveport (however, despite now having a much smaller pool of teams to compete against in the playoffs, Curtis and Evangel have only won three championships combined since the split). Schools deemed as "selective" included charter, dual-curriculum, laboratory, magnet, and private schools (it did not, however, include schools with gifted education programs or, notably, schools allowed to have a parish-wide attendance zone for football players if designated as the sole football-playing public school within that parish; Winnfield Senior High is the only football-playing school in Winn Parish). Though largely opposed to the split, in 2019 select schools voted to create their own "Louisiana Select Association" (LSA) to manage issues that they felt had not been properly addressed by the LHSAA membership as a whole. Shortly afterward, this new LSA—led by a number of South Louisiana schools that accused the LHSAA of not living up to its obligations to share revenue from the football championship games held at the Caesars Superdome—then declined to use the Superdome for its own select division championship games, starting with the 2019 event. However, all select championship games moved back to the Superdome in 2022.

The LHSAA, which is based in Baton Rouge, has been recognized as Louisiana's sole representative to the National Federation of State High School Associations over other competing private school associations. The 2016 Louisiana floods caused extensive damage to the LHSAA's offices. Shortly before that event the LHSAA "was legally deemed a private organization"—which could hold future ramifications over the transparency of its inside activities, as well as its member schools' ability to internally and publicly challenge its decisions in a court of law.

The listing below includes all LHSAA football champions since its founding. In recent years, six championship games (played between 2005 and 2020) were ordered forfeited by the LHSAA. In each early case, as per LHSAA rules, the runner-up was recognized as the new state champion and awarded its respective trophy, except for Baton Rouge University Lab's 2013 team, which could only be nominally acknowledged as champion since Curtis sought to challenge its forfeiture in court—and the LHSAA physically awarding the championship trophy to University Lab could not be "revisited" until the pending lawsuit was decided. Curtis did eventually lose the suit but has since refused to return the trophy for reissuing. Early indications are that Baton Rouge Catholic's recently forfeited 2017 and 2020 Select Division I titles may not necessarily be reissued to the respective runners-up, as publicly-available LHSAA paperwork has not been updated to reflect those changes. It is not immediately clear why that is, given the past precedents. Curtis would actually stand to benefit by receiving the 2017 trophy.

=== Mississippi Private School Association / Mississippi Association of Independent Schools / Midsouth Association of Independent Schools (since 1988) ===
The Mississippi Private School Association was formed in 1968, and individual Louisiana schools have been participating in it since at least 1988. When the LISA disbanded after the 1991–92 school year, a number of former LISA schools joined it. The association changed its name to the "Mississippi Association of Independent Schools" (MAIS) in 2009, and then to the "Midsouth Association of Independent Schools" in 2019 to more fully reflect its member institutions from Alabama, Arkansas, Louisiana, Mississippi, and Tennessee. As of 2020 there are thirteen MAIS schools located in Louisiana. Due to restrictions issued by the state government, Louisiana's MAIS schools were initially the only Louisiana high schools that could play football during the COVID-19 pandemic, provided that they not play their games within the borders of Louisiana.

Below is a listing of all Louisiana-based MAIS football champions (beginning with the 2019 season, classes 1A and 2A were reorganized to reflect the winners of MAIS' eight-man football championships and, as such, is not included with this listing).

=== Louisiana Independent Football Tournament (since 2015) ===
With the ACEL membership no longer fielding enough eleven-man football teams to merit additional formal championships, some remaining teams (primarily those with homeschooling backgrounds, which are able to rely on a growing number of students) went outside the association to continue participating in championship competition. They formed the "Louisiana Independent Football Tournament" (LIFT) to compete in.

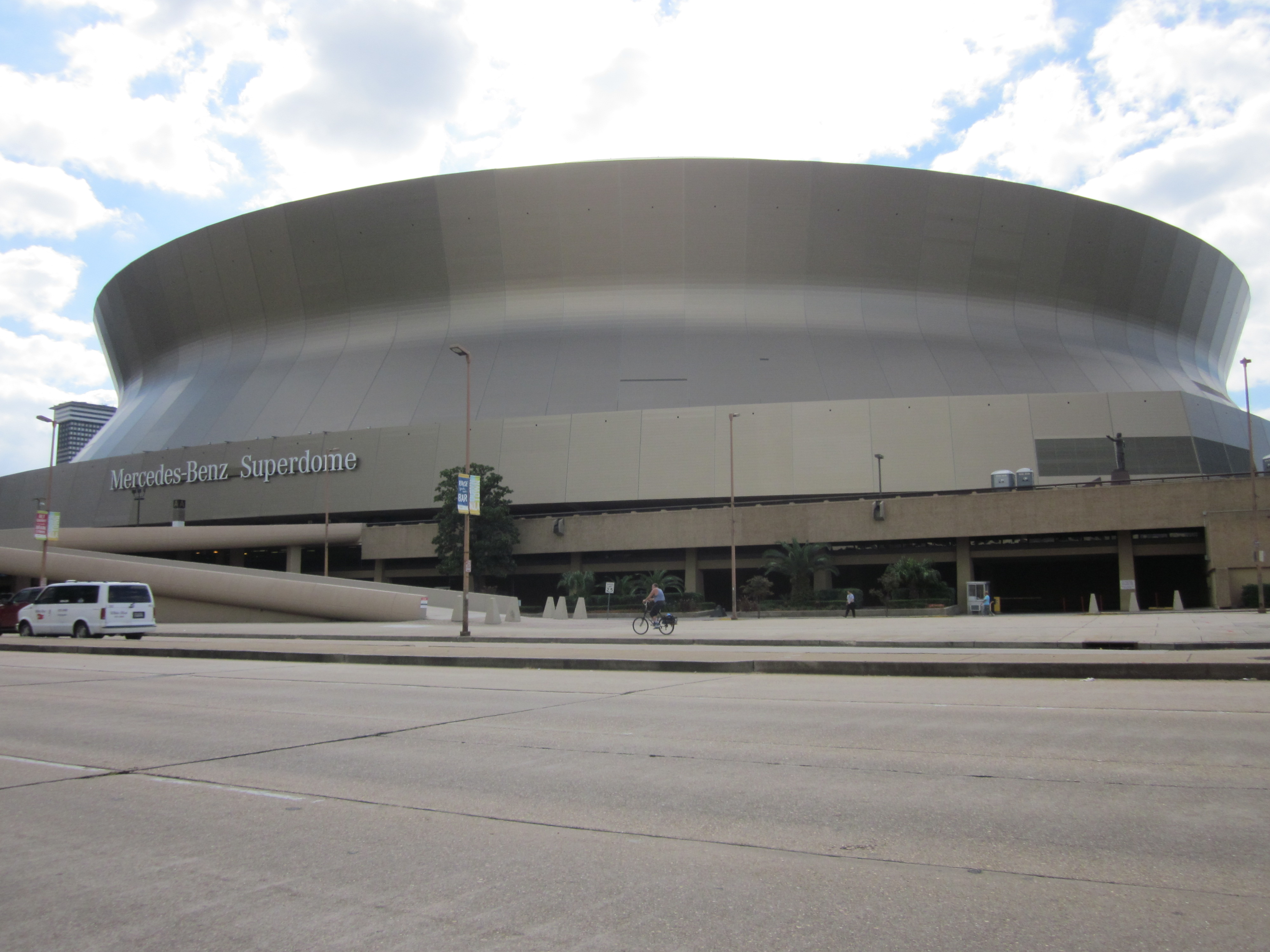
The Caesars Superdome in New Orleans: a regular venue for LHSAA Prep Classic state championship football games since 1981.

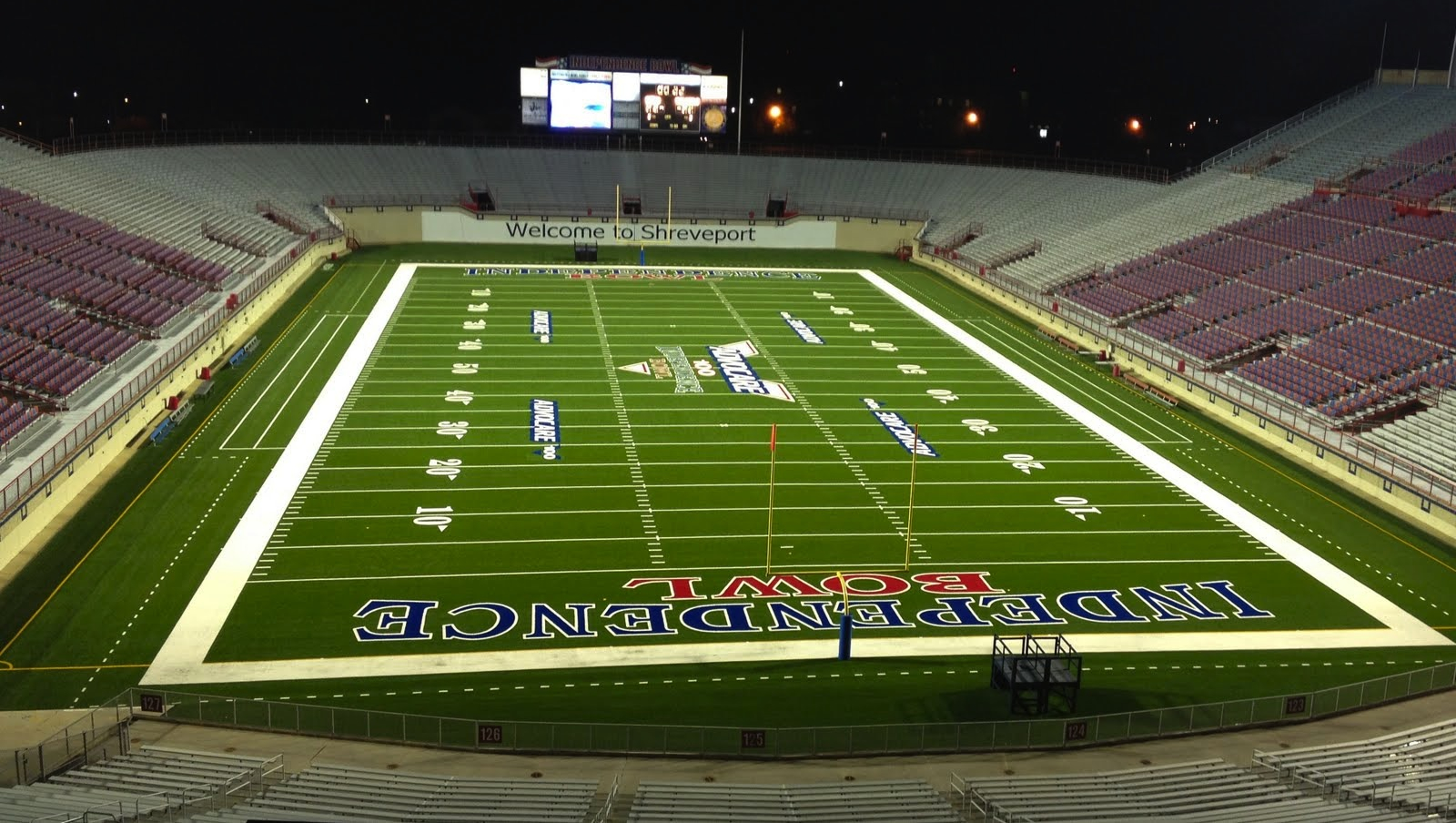
Independence Stadium in Shreveport: a temporary venue for LHSAA Nokia Sugar Bowl Prep Classic state championship football games in 2005, due to the aftermath of Hurricane Katrina.

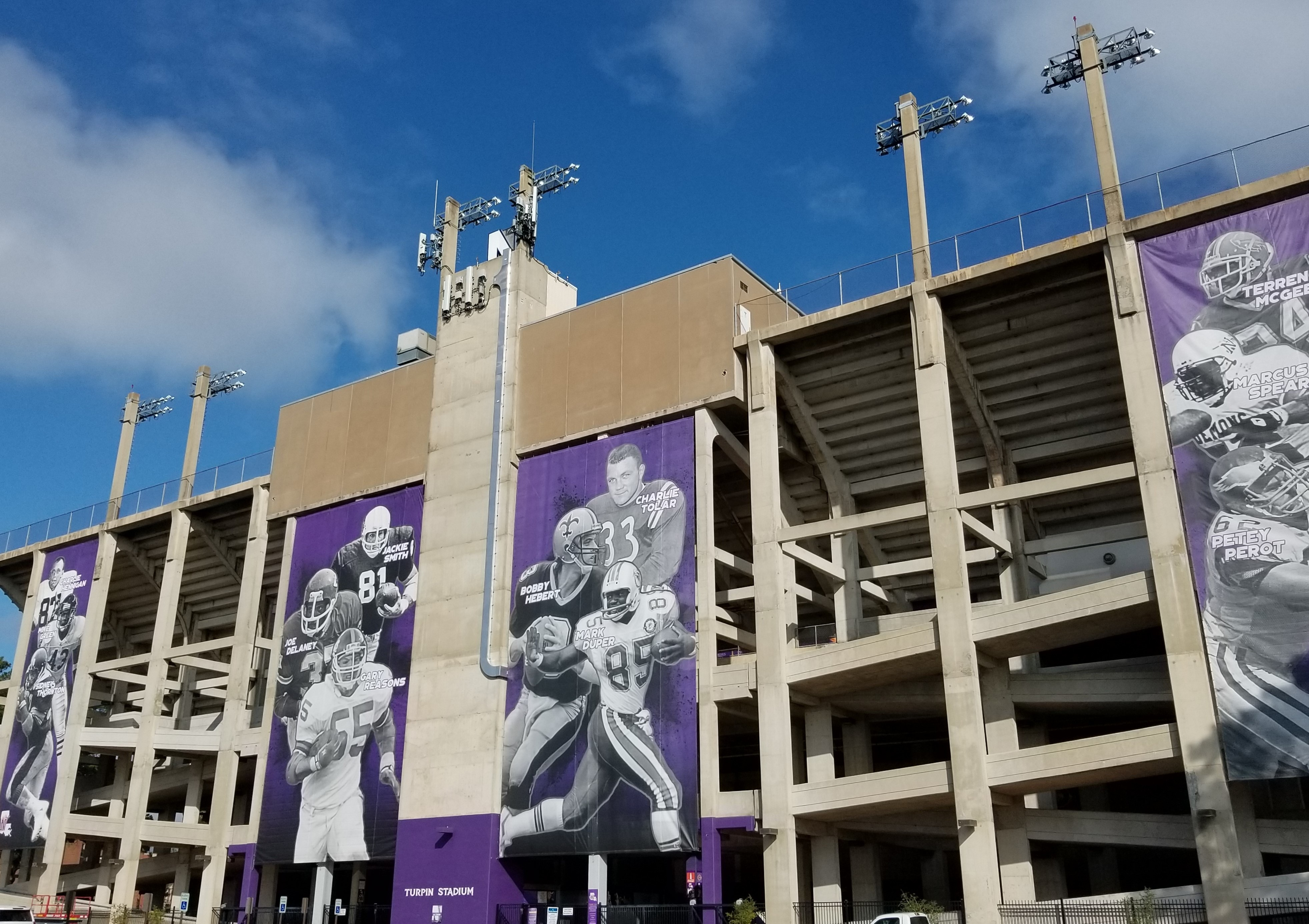
Harry Turpin Stadium in Natchitoches: a temporary venue for LHSAA Prep Classic state championship football games in 2020, due to the COVID-19 pandemic.

== State championships by year * ==
Note: *—although MPSA/MAIS championships are not, strictly speaking, "state" championships per se, those titles are included with these totals for comparative purposes

| Year | Unsponsored State Championship Game |
|---|---|
| 1907 | Convent/Jefferson College |

| Year | Nº | Unsponsored State Championship Games |
|---|---|---|
| 1908 | first game | Jennings |
| 1908 | second game | Jennings |

| Year | Unsponsored State Championship Game | Louisiana High School Rally |
|---|---|---|
| 1909 | Baton Rouge | Baton Rouge |

| Year | Calcasieu–Louisiana Fair |
|---|---|
| 1910 | Lake Charles |

| Year | Unsponsored State Championship Game |
|---|---|
| 1911 | Baton Rouge |

| Year | Nº | Unsponsored State Championship Games |
|---|---|---|
| 1912 | first game | New Orleans/Easton |
| 1912 | second game | New Orleans/Easton |
| 1913 | first game | Baton Rouge |
| 1913 | second game | Baton Rouge |

| Year | State Fair of Louisiana | Nº | Unsponsored State Championship Games |
|---|---|---|---|
| 1914 | Shreveport * | first game | Baton Rouge |
| 1914 | Shreveport * | second game | New Orleans/Easton |
| 1914 | Shreveport * | third game | New Orleans/Easton |

Note: *—championship disputed (Baton Rouge High later maintained that shortly before game time Shreveport High, later called C. E. Byrd, acknowledged fielding an ineligible player, so BRHS only agreed to continue if the game would be re-designated as an informal exhibition game; neither SHS nor the State Fair of Louisiana is known to have been documented as having corroborated this claim)

| Year | State Fair of Louisiana | Times–Picayune |
|---|---|---|
| 1915 | Shreveport | New Orleans/Easton |

| Year | LHSAA |
|---|---|
| 1916 | New Orleans/Easton * |

Note: *—association withheld formal sanctioning of postseason games but declared champion instead

| Year | LHSAA | National Farm and Live Stock Show and Live Stock Buyers' Convention | Nº | Unsponsored State Championship Games |
|---|---|---|---|---|
| 1917 | (none) * | New Orleans/Easton | first game | Baton Rouge |
| 1917 | (none) * | New Orleans/Easton | second game | Baton Rouge |

Note: *—association withheld formal sanctioning of postseason games but also declined to declare champions

| Year | LHSAA | Spalding’s Official Foot Ball Guide |
|---|---|---|
| 1918 | (none) * | New Orleans/Easton |

Note: *—association withheld formal sanctioning of postseason games but also declined to declare champions

| Year | LHSAA | Unsponsored State Championship Game |
|---|---|---|
| 1919 | (none) * | Baton Rouge |

Note: *—association withheld formal sanctioning of postseason games but also declined to declare champions

| Year | LHSAA | Unsponsored State Championship Game |
|---|---|---|
| 1920 | New Orleans/Easton | New Orleans/Easton |

| Year | LHSAA Class A |
|---|---|
| 1921 | New Orleans/Easton |

| Year | LHSAA Class A | Texas–Louisiana Series |
|---|---|---|
| 1922 | (none) * | Shreveport ** |
| 1923 | Morgan City † | Homer ** |

Notes: *—association withheld formal sanctioning of postseason games but also declined to declare champion; **—declared champions by the organizers for the purposes of the series; †—association withheld formal sanctioning of postseason games but declared champions instead

| Year | LHSAA Class A |
|---|---|
| 1924 | Haynesville * |
| 1925 | Ruston ** |

Notes: *—championship game ceded, by Shreveport High (later called C. E. Byrd); **—association withheld formal sanctioning of postseason games but declared champions instead

| Year | LHSAA Class A | Unsponsored State Championship Game |
|---|---|---|
| 1926 | Shreveport/Byrd * | Baton Rouge Colored |
| 1927 | Bastrop | Baton Rouge/McKinley |

Note: *—association withheld formal sanctioning of postseason games but declared champions instead

| Year | LHSAA Class A | LHSAA Class B | Unsponsored State Championship Game |
|---|---|---|---|
| 1928 | Homer | Kentwood | Ruston/Lincoln |
| 1929 | Haynesville | Rayville | Baton Rouge/McKinley |

| Year | LHSAA Class A | LHSAA Class B |
|---|---|---|
| 1930 | Shreveport/Byrd | Jonesboro |
| 1931 | Shreveport/Byrd | Rayville |
| 1932 | Lake Charles | Tallulah |
| 1933 | New Orleans/Jesuit * | Tallulah |
| 1934 | Shreveport/Byrd | Tallulah |
| 1935 | Shreveport/Byrd | Vinton |

Note: *—championship game tie broken by total 20-yard line penetrations

| Year | LHSAA Class A | LHSAA Class B | LIALA |
|---|---|---|---|
| 1936 | Haynesville | Vinton | New Orleans/Xavier Prep |

| Year | LHSAA Class AA | LHSAA Class A | LHSAA Class B | LIALA |
|---|---|---|---|---|
| 1937 | Shreveport/Byrd | Homer | Columbia | New Orleans/Xavier Prep |
| 1938 | Baton Rouge/Istrouma | Minden | Lake Charles/LaGrange | Bogalusa/Central |
| 1939 | Jennings * | Homer ** | Kentwood | Bogalusa/Central |

Notes: *—championship game ceded, by Baton Rouge/Istrouma; **—championship game tie broken by total first downs

| Year | LHSAA Class AA | LHSAA Class A | LHSAA Class B | LIALA | Magnolia Bowl |
|---|---|---|---|---|---|
| 1940 | New Orleans/Jesuit | Ponchatoula | Arcadia | New Orleans/Xavier Prep | Baton Rouge/McKinley |

| Year | LHSAA Class AA | LHSAA Class A | LHSAA Class B | LIALA Class AA | LIALA Class A |
|---|---|---|---|---|---|
| 1941 | New Orleans/Jesuit | Ruston | Donaldsonville Catholic | New Orleans/Xavier Prep | Baton Rouge/Southern |

| Year | LHSAA Class AA | LHSAA Class A | LHSAA Class B | LIALA |
|---|---|---|---|---|
| 1942 | New Orleans/Easton * | Bossier | Lake Charles/Landry Memorial | Baton Rouge/McKinley |
| 1943 | New Orleans/Jesuit | Sulphur | Waterproof ** | Ruston/Lincoln |
| 1944 | Baton Rouge | Sulphur | Slidell | (none) † |
| 1945 | New Orleans/Holy Cross | Jonesboro–Hodge | Slidell | Bogalusa/Central Memorial ‡ |
| 1946 | New Orleans/Jesuit | Sulphur | Tallulah | Bogalusa/Central Memorial § |

Notes: *—championship game played under "Toy Bowl" moniker; **—championship game ceded, by New Orleans Academy; †—championship game not held but league also declined to declare champion; ‡—New Orleans Gilbert Academy is described by a modern source as having won the championship, but contemporary sources have not been documented as having corroborated this claim; §—New Orleans Booker T. Washington is described by a modern source as having won the championship, but contemporary sources have not been documented as having corroborated this claim

| Year | LHSAA Class AA | LHSAA Class A | LHSAA Class B | LIALA Class AA | LIALA Class A |
|---|---|---|---|---|---|
| 1947 | Bogalusa | Ruston | Baker | Baton Rouge/Southern | Bossier City Colored * |
| 1948 | New Orleans/Fortier ** | Bossier | Tallulah | Ruston/Lincoln | Bossier City Colored |

Notes: *—championship determined by declaration because North Louisiana champion had no available opponents (no members of Class A were located in the southern part of the state); **—championship game played under "Toy Bowl" moniker

| Year | LHSAA Class AA | LHSAA Class A | LHSAA Class B | LIALA Class AA | LIALA Class A | LIALA Class B |
|---|---|---|---|---|---|---|
| 1949 | Shreveport/Byrd | Destrehan | Boutte/Hahnville | New Orleans/Booker T. Washington | Baton Rouge/Southern | Bernice Colored |

| Year | LHSAA Class AA | LHSAA Class A | LHSAA Class B | LIALO Class AA | LIALO Class A | LIALO Class B |
|---|---|---|---|---|---|---|
| 1950 | Baton Rouge/Istrouma | Baker | Clinton | New Orleans/Booker T. Washington * | Lake Charles/W. O. Boston | Winnfield/Winn Training ** |
| 1951 | Baton Rouge/Istrouma | Ruston | Delhi | Shreveport/Booker T. Washington | Winnfield/Winn Training | Haynesville Colored |

Notes: *—championship game tie broken by total first downs; **—championship disputed (Winnfield Winn Training, later called Pinecrest, claimed that it was the legitimate champion because it maintained that its scheduled championship game opponent, Lake Charles W. O. Boston, had acknowledged having too many students to participate in Class B and had not even played any conference games before being considered for South Louisiana's automatic bid to the contest—neither WOBHS nor the league is known to have been documented as having corroborated this claim, but Pinecrest is known to have refused to play the game; notably, the 1951 WOBHS annual yearbook describes its school as having won the 1950 Class A state championship instead)

| Year | LHSAA Class AA | LHSAA Class A | LHSAA Class B | LIALO Class AA | LIALO Class A |
|---|---|---|---|---|---|
| 1952 | Shreveport/Fair Park | Springhill | Kenner | Shreveport/Booker T. Washington | Jonesboro Colored |
| 1953 | New Orleans/Jesuit | Westlake | Ferriday | Monroe/Carroll * | Lutcher/Cypress Grove |

Note: *—championship game tie broken by total penetrations

| Year | LHSAA Class AAA | LHSAA Class AA | LHSAA Class A | LHSAA Class B | LIALO Class AA | LIALO Class A |
|---|---|---|---|---|---|---|
| 1954 | Lake Charles | Minden | Ferriday | Donaldsonville | Baton Rouge/McKinley | Haynesville Colored |
| 1955 | Baton Rouge/Istrouma | Monroe/Neville | Ferriday | New Orleans/Holy Name | Baton Rouge/Capitol Avenue | Haynesville Colored |
| 1956 | Baton Rouge/Istrouma | Minden | Ferriday | Mangham | Mansfield/DeSoto * | Zachary/Northwestern |

Note: *—championship game tie broken by total yardage

| Year | Selector | Overall | Class AAA | Class AA | Class A | Class B | LIALO Class AAA | LIALO Class AA | LIALO Class A |
|---|---|---|---|---|---|---|---|---|---|
| 1957 | LHSAA | | Baton Rouge/Istrouma | Morgan City | Tallulah | Delhi | Mansfield/DeSoto | Clinton/East Feliciana Industrial Training | Marion Industrial |
| 1957 | LPGS | Baton Rouge/Istrouma | Baton Rouge/Istrouma | Morgan City | Baton Rouge/University Lab | Delhi | Mansfield/DeSoto | Clinton/East Feliciana Industrial Training | Marion Industrial |
| 1958 | LHSAA | | Lake Charles | Reserve/Godchaux | Tallulah | Greensburg | Mansfield/DeSoto | Lake Charles/W. O. Boston | DeQuincy/Grand Avenue |
| 1958 | LPGS | Baton Rouge/Istrouma | Baton Rouge/Istrouma | Reserve/Godchaux | Tallulah | Vacherie/St. James | Mansfield/DeSoto | Lake Charles/W. O. Boston | DeQuincy/Grand Avenue |
| 1959 | LHSAA | | Baton Rouge/Istrouma | Monroe/Neville | Houma/St. Francis | Vacherie/St. James | New Orleans/Landry | Bastrop/Morehouse | Lillie/Westside |
| 1959 | LPGS | Baton Rouge/Istrouma | Baton Rouge/Istrouma | Monroe/Neville | Baton Rouge/Redemptorist | Vacherie/St. James | New Orleans/Landry | Bastrop/Morehouse | Lillie/Westside |
| 1959 | Morning Advocate | | Baton Rouge/Istrouma | | | | New Orleans/Landry | Bastrop/Morehouse | Lillie/Westside |

| Year | LHSAA Class AAA | LHSAA Class AA | LHSAA Class A | LHSAA Class B | LIALO Class AAA | LIALO Class AA | LIALO Class A |
|---|---|---|---|---|---|---|---|
| 1960 | New Orleans/Jesuit | Pineville | Tallulah | Vacherie/St. James | Lake Charles/Washington | Rosedale/Levy | Westlake/Mossville |
| 1961 | Baton Rouge/Istrouma | Monroe/Neville | Tallulah | Oberlin | Monroe/Carroll | Homer/Mayfield * | Shreveport/Notre Dame |
| 1962 | Baton Rouge/Istrouma | Monroe/Neville | New Iberia/Catholic | Clinton | Monroe/Carroll | Monroe/Richwood | Shreveport/Notre Dame |
| 1963 | New Orleans/Holy Cross | Minden High School (Louisiana) | Amite | Lockport | New Orleans/St. Augustine | Monroe/Richwood | Leesville/Vernon |
| 1964 | Baton Rouge | Napoleonville/Assumption | Lockport | Metairie/Ridgewood Prep | Shreveport/Booker T. Washington | Monroe/Richwood | Angie/Ray |
| 1965 | Sulphur | Larose–Cutoff | Lake Charles/Landry Memorial | Arcadia | New Orleans/St. Augustine | Baton Rouge/Southern Lab | DeQuincy/Grand Avenue |
| 1966 | Baton Rouge/Broadmoor | Central | Buras | Vacherie/St. James | New Orleans/St. Augustine | West Monroe/Richardson | DeQuincy/Grand Avenue |
| 1967 | Bossier City/Airline | Shreveport/Jesuit | Kinder | Ville Platte/Sacred Heart | Marrero/Lincoln | West Monroe/Richardson | Leesville/Vernon |
| 1968 | Shreveport/Woodlawn | Boutte/Hahnville | Thibodaux/E. D. White Catholic | Clinton | Monroe/Carroll | Baton Rouge/Southern Lab | Leesville/Vernon |
| 1969 | Bogalusa | Natchitoches | Thibodaux/E. D. White Catholic | Kentwood | Baton Rouge/Scotlandville | Princeton | Farmerville/Eastside |

Note: *—championship game determined by forfeit, by Bogalusa Central Memorial

| Year | LHSAA Class AAAA | LHSAA Class AAA | LHSAA Class AA | LHSAA Class A | LISA |
|---|---|---|---|---|---|
| 1970 | Harvey/West Jefferson | Hammond | Haynesville | Elton | Amite City/Valley Forge |

| Year | LHSAA Class AAAA | LHSAA Class AAA | LHSAA Class AA | LHSAA Class A | LISA Class AA | LISA Class A |
|---|---|---|---|---|---|---|
| 1971 | New Orleans/Brother Martin | Cut Off/South Lafourche | Haynesville * | Edgard/Second Ward | Ferriday/Huntington | St. Joseph/Tensas Academy |
| 1972 | Monroe/Neville | Boutte/Hahnville ** | Lake Charles/W. O. Boston | Edgard/Second Ward | Reserve/Riverside | Tallulah Academy |
| 1973 | Shreveport/Captain Shreve | Destrehan | Crowley/Notre Dame | Donaldsonville/Ascension Catholic | Reserve/Riverside | Natchitoches Academy |
| 1974 | Baton Rouge/Tara | Monroe/Richwood | Opelousas Catholic | Baton Rouge/University Lab | Clinton/Silliman | Hammond/Southwood Academy |
| 1975 | New Orleans/St. Augustine | Lutcher | River Ridge/John Curtis Christian | Gilbert | Reserve/Riverside | Opelousas/Belmont |
| 1976 | Covington | Shreveport/Jesuit | Crowley/Notre Dame | Franklin/Hanson Memorial | Metairie/Barthe | Gonzales/East Ascension Academy |
| 1977 | Cut Off/South Lafourche | Haughton | River Ridge/John Curtis Christian | Natchitoches/St. Mary's Catholic | Rayville/Riverfield | St. Joseph/Tensas Academy |
| 1978 | New Orleans/St. Augustine | Lutcher | Kinder | New Roads/Catholic | Hammond/Southwood Academy | St. Joseph/Tensas Academy |
| 1979 | New Orleans/St. Augustine | Vacherie/St. James † | River Ridge/John Curtis Christian | Port Sulphur | Lake Providence/Briarfield | Tallulah Academy |
| 1980 | Reserve/East St. John | Minden | River Ridge/John Curtis Christian | Baton Rouge/Southern Lab | Reserve/Riverside | Tallulah Academy |
| 1981 | Marrero/Ehret | St. Martinville | River Ridge/John Curtis Christian | Port Sulphur | Plain Dealing Academy | Haynesville/Claiborne |
| 1982 | Ruston | Eunice | Winnfield | Baton Rouge/Southern Lab | Amite City/Valley Forge | St. Joseph/Tensas Academy |
| 1983 | Monroe/Neville | Lutcher | River Ridge/John Curtis Christian | Kentwood | Reserve/Riverside | Franklinton/Bowling Green |
| 1984 | Monroe/Neville | St. Martinville | River Ridge/John Curtis Christian | Haynesville | Reserve/Riverside | West Monroe/Ridgedale |
| 1985 | Marrero/Ehret | River Ridge/John Curtis Christian | Springhill | Monroe/Ouachita Christian | Reserve/Riverside | Shreveport/First Baptist |
| 1986 | Ruston ‡ | Monroe/Wossman | Kentwood | Baton Rouge/Southern Lab | Reserve/Riverside | Plain Dealing Academy |
| 1987 | Marrero/Shaw | River Ridge/John Curtis Christian | Jonesboro–Hodge | Haynesville | West Monroe/Ridgedale | Haynesville/Claiborne |

Notes: *—championship game tie broken by total first downs; **—championship game tie broken by total first downs; †—championship game determined by overtime; ‡—championship game determined by overtime

| Year | LHSAA Class AAAA | LHSAA Class AAA | LHSAA Class AA | LHSAA Class A | LISA Class AA | LISA Class A | MPSA (if won by a Louisiana school) |
|---|---|---|---|---|---|---|---|
| 1988 | Ruston | River Ridge/John Curtis Christian | Jonesboro–Hodge | Baton Rouge/University Lab | Bastrop/Prairie View | Plain Dealing Academy | (none) * |
| 1989 | Monroe/Ouachita Parish | Crowley | Jonesboro–Hodge | Oak Grove | New Roads/False River | Lake Providence/Briarfield | (none) * |
| 1990 | Ruston | River Ridge/John Curtis Christian | Buras | Haynesville | Monroe/River Oaks | Haynesville/Claiborne | (none) * |

Note: *—no championship games won by Louisiana schools

| Year | LHSAA Class 5A | LHSAA Class 4A | LHSAA Class 3A | LHSAA Class 2A | LHSAA Class 1A | LISA Class AA | LISA Class A | MPSA (if won by a Louisiana school) |
|---|---|---|---|---|---|---|---|---|
| 1991 | Thibodaux * | Bourg/South Terrebonne | Mansfield | Haynesville | Oak Grove | Rayville/Riverfield | Lake Providence/Briarfield | (none) ** |

Notes: *—championship game determined by overtime; **—no championship games won by Louisiana schools

| Year | LHSAA Class 5A | LHSAA Class 4A | LHSAA Class 3A | LHSAA Class 2A | LHSAA Class 1A | MPSA (if won by a Louisiana school) |
|---|---|---|---|---|---|---|
| 1992 | Lafayette/Carencro * | Boutte/Hahnville | Jennings | Coushatta | Donaldsonville/Ascension Catholic | Class A: Tallulah Academy |
| 1993 | West Monroe | River Ridge/John Curtis Christian | New Orleans/Karr * | Haynesville | Shreveport/Evangel Christian | (none) ** |
| 1994 | Boutte/Hahnville | Slidell/Salmen | Amite | Haynesville | Shreveport/Evangel Christian | (none) ** |
| 1995 | Monroe/Neville | Slidell/Salmen | Breaux Bridge/Cecilia | Haynesville | Logansport | (none) ** |
| 1996 | West Monroe | River Ridge/John Curtis Christian | Shreveport/Evangel Christian | Haynesville | Baton Rouge/Southern Lab † | Class AAA: Clinton/Silliman |
| 1997 | West Monroe | River Ridge/John Curtis Christian | Shreveport/Evangel Christian | Monroe/Ouachita Christian | Kentwood | Class AA: Franklinton/Bowling Green |
| 1998 | West Monroe | River Ridge/John Curtis Christian | Shreveport/Evangel Christian | Edgard/West St. John | Kentwood | (none) ** |
| 1999 | Shreveport/Evangel Christian | River Ridge/John Curtis Christian | Amite | Iota | Oak Grove | (none) ** |
| 2000 | West Monroe | Slidell/Salmen | Crowley/Notre Dame | Monroe/Ouachita Christian | Haynesville | (none) ** |
| 2001 | Shreveport/Evangel Christian | River Ridge/John Curtis Christian | Baton Rouge/Parkview Baptist | Farmerville | Oak Grove | Class AAA: Clinton/Silliman |
| 2002 | Shreveport/Evangel Christian | River Ridge/John Curtis Christian | Baton Rouge/Redemptorist | Port Barre | Port Sulphur | Class AA: Amite City/Oak Forest |
| 2003 | Boutte/Hahnville | Baton Rouge/Redemptorist | Lutcher | Edgard/West St. John | Abbeville/Vermilion Catholic | (none) ** |
| 2004 | Shreveport/Evangel Christian | River Ridge/John Curtis Christian | Amite | Edgard/West St. John | St. George/Dunham | Class A: Haynesville/Claiborne |
| 2005 | West Monroe | Breaux Bridge ‡ | Baton Rouge/Redemptorist | River Ridge/John Curtis Christian | Shreveport/Evangel Christian | Class A: Monroe/River Oaks |

Notes: *—championship game determined by overtime; **—no championship games won by Louisiana schools; †—championship game determined by double-overtime; ‡—championship game determined by forfeit, by Bastrop

| Year | LHSAA Class 5A | LHSAA Class 4A | LHSAA Class 3A | LHSAA Class 2A | LHSAA Class 1A | MPSA (if won by a Louisiana school) | LCSAA |
|---|---|---|---|---|---|---|---|
| 2006 | Lafayette/Acadiana | Bastrop | Lutcher | River Ridge/John Curtis Christian | Shreveport/Evangel Christian | (none) * | Baton Rouge/Christian Home Educators Fellowship |
| 2007 | Destrehan | Bastrop | Baton Rouge/Parkview Baptist | River Ridge/John Curtis Christian | Buras/South Plaquemines | Class A: Minden/Glenbrook | Baton Rouge/Christian Home Educators Fellowship |
| 2008 | Destrehan | Belle Chasse | Lutcher | River Ridge/John Curtis Christian | Buras/South Plaquemines | (none) * | Abbeville/Lighthouse Christian Prep |

Note: *—no championship games won by Louisiana schools

| Year | LHSAA Class 5A | LHSAA Class 4A | LHSAA Class 3A | LHSAA Class 2A | LHSAA Class 1A | MAIS (if won by a Louisiana school) | LCSAA |
|---|---|---|---|---|---|---|---|
| 2009 | West Monroe | Monroe/Neville | Crowley/Notre Dame | Shreveport/Evangel Christian | Haynesville | (none) * | Breaux Bridge Christian |
| 2010 | Lafayette/Acadiana | Franklinton ** | Baton Rouge/Parkview Baptist | Shreveport/Evangel Christian | White Castle | Class AA: Monroe/River Oaks | Houma/Covenant Christian |
| 2011 | West Monroe | Monroe/Neville | LaPlace/St. Charles Catholic | River Ridge/John Curtis Christian | Monroe/Ouachita Christian | (none) * | Houma/Covenant Christian |

Notes: *—no championship games won by Louisiana schools; **—championship game determined by overtime

| Year | LHSAA Class 5A | LHSAA Class 4A | LHSAA Class 3A | LHSAA Class 2A | LHSAA Class 1A | MAIS (if won by a Louisiana school) | ACEL |
|---|---|---|---|---|---|---|---|
| 2012 | Metairie/Rummel | New Orleans/Karr | Baton Rouge/Parkview Baptist | River Ridge/John Curtis Christian | Monroe/Ouachita Christian | (none) * | Lafayette/Acadiana Home School Athletics |

Note: *—no championship games won by Louisiana schools

| Year | LHSAA Non-select Class 5A | LHSAA Non-select Class 4A | LHSAA Non-select Class 3A | LHSAA Non-select Class 2A | LHSAA Non-select Class 1A | LHSAA Select Division I | LHSAA Select Division II | LHSAA Select Division III | LHSAA Select Division IV | MAIS (if won by a Louisiana school) | ACEL |
|---|---|---|---|---|---|---|---|---|---|---|---|
| 2013 | Lafayette/Acadiana | Metairie/East Jefferson | Farmerville/Union Parish * | Kinder | Haynesville | Metairie/Rummel | Baton Rouge/University Lab ** | Shreveport/Calvary Baptist | Abbeville/Vermilion Catholic | (none) † | Baton Rouge/Christian Home Educators Fellowship |
| 2014 | Lafayette/Acadiana | Monroe/Neville | Livonia | Many | Haynesville | New Orleans/Jesuit | Baton Rouge/University Lab | Shreveport/Calvary Baptist | Monroe/Ouachita Christian | Class AAA—Division II: Amite City/Oak Forest | Baton Rouge/Christian Home Educators Fellowship |

Notes: *—championship game determined by double-overtime; **—championship game determined by forfeit, by River Ridge John Curtis Christian; †—no championship games won by Louisiana schools

| Year | LHSAA Non-select Class 5A | LHSAA Non-select Class 4A | LHSAA Non-select Class 3A | LHSAA Non-select Class 2A | LHSAA Non-select Class 1A | LHSAA Select Division I | LHSAA Select Division II | LHSAA Select Division III | LHSAA Select Division IV | MAIS (if won by a Louisiana school) | LIFT |
|---|---|---|---|---|---|---|---|---|---|---|---|
| 2015 | Zachary | Monroe/Neville | Lutcher | Kinder | Kentwood | Baton Rouge/Catholic | Baton Rouge/Parkview Baptist | Crowley/Notre Dame | Natchitoches/St. Mary's Catholic * | Class AAA: Clinton/Silliman | Baton Rouge/Christian Home Educators Fellowship |
| 2016 | New Orleans/Landry–Walker Prep | New Orleans/Karr | Lutcher | Monroe/Sterlington | Logansport | Shreveport/Evangel Christian | Lafayette/St. Thomas More Catholic | Reserve/Riverside | Youngsville/Ascension Episcopal * | (none) ** | Baton Rouge/Christian Home Educators Fellowship |
| 2017 | Zachary | New Orleans/Karr | St. Francisville/West Feliciana | Welsh | Edgard/West St. John | ~~Baton Rouge/Catholic~~ † | Baton Rouge/University Lab | New Iberia/Catholic | Lafayette Christian | (none) ** | Lafayette/Acadiana Christian Athletics |
| 2018 | Zachary | New Orleans/Karr | Eunice | Amite | Kentwood | River Ridge/John Curtis Christian | Baton Rouge/University Lab | Crowley/Notre Dame | Lafayette Christian | (none) ** | Lafayette/Acadiana Christian Athletics |

Notes: *—championship game determined by forfeit, by Baton Rouge Southern Lab; **—no championship games won by Louisiana schools; †—championship game determined by forfeit, by Baton Rouge Catholic (the LHSAA is not yet documented as having formally recognized runner-up River Ridge John Curtis Christian as the new champion)

| Year | LHSAA Non-select Class 5A | LHSAA Non-select Class 4A | LHSAA Non-select Class 3A | LHSAA Non-select Class 2A | LHSAA Non-select Class 1A | LHSAA Louisiana Select Association Division I | LHSAA Louisiana Select Association Division II | LHSAA Louisiana Select Association Division III | LHSAA Louisiana Select Association Division IV | MAIS (if won by a Louisiana school) | LIFT |
|---|---|---|---|---|---|---|---|---|---|---|---|
| 2019 | Lafayette/Acadiana | New Orleans/Karr | Vacherie/St. James | Ferriday | Oak Grove | Metairie/Rummel | Lafayette/St. Thomas More Catholic | Lafayette Christian | Monroe/Ouachita Christian | Class AAAA: Rayville/Riverfield | Lafayette/Acadiana Christian Athletics |
| 2020 | Lafayette/Acadiana | Lafayette/Carencro | Baton Rouge/Madison Prep | Many | Oak Grove | ~~Baton Rouge/Catholic~~ * | Lafayette/St. Thomas More Catholic | Lafayette Christian | Shreveport/Calvary Baptist | Class AAAA: Rayville/Riverfield | Lafayette/Acadiana Christian Athletics |
| 2021 | Zachary | New Iberia/Westgate | Monroe/Sterlington | Amite | Homer | Baton Rouge/Catholic | Baton Rouge/University Lab | LaPlace/St. Charles Catholic | Baton Rouge/Southern Lab | (none) ** | Lafayette/Acadiana Christian Athletics |

Notes: *—championship game determined by forfeit, by Baton Rouge Catholic (the LHSAA is not yet documented as having formally recognized runner-up Shreveport Byrd as the new champion); **—no championship games won by Louisiana schools

| Year | LHSAA Non-select Division I | LHSAA Non-select Division II | LHSAA Non-select Division III | LHSAA Non-select Division IV | LHSAA Select Division I | LHSAA Select Division II | LHSAA Select Division III | LHSAA Select Division IV | MAIS (if won by a Louisiana school) | LIFT |
|---|---|---|---|---|---|---|---|---|---|---|
| 2022 | Destrehan | Lutcher | Many | Oak Grove | River Ridge/John Curtis Christian | Lafayette/St. Thomas More | LaPlace/St. Charles Catholic | Monroe/Ouachita Christian | Class 5A: Amite City/Oak Forest | Lafayette/Acadiana Christian Athletics |
| 2023 | Ruston | Opelousas | Farmerville/Union Parish | Oak Grove | Baton Rouge/Catholic | Lafayette/St. Thomas More | Shreveport/Calvary Baptist | Baton Rouge/Southern Lab | (none) * | Baton Rouge/Christian Home Educators Fellowship ** |
| 2024 | Central | Cecilia | Monroe/Sterlington | Buras/South Plaquemines | New Orleans/Karr | Marrero/Shaw | New Iberia/Catholic | Abbeville/Vermilion Catholic | (none) * | Baton Rouge/Christian Home Educators Fellowship |
| 2025 | Monroe/Ouachita Parish | Iowa | Monroe/Sterlington | Haynesville | New Orleans/Karr | LaPlace/St. Charles Catholic | St. George/Dunham | Reserve/Riverside | (none) * | Baton Rouge/Christian Home Educators Fellowship |

Notes: *—no championship games won by Louisiana schools; **—championship game determined by forfeit, by Lafayette Acadiana Christian Athletics

== State championships by school * ** ==
Notes: *—although MPSA/MAIS championships are not, strictly speaking, "state" championships per se, those titles are included with these totals for comparative purposes; **—most recent school name is used, when available

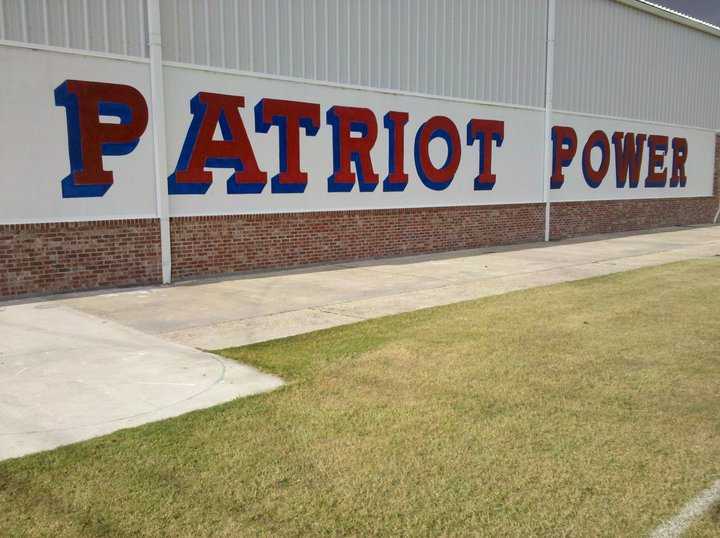
Wall of the John Curtis Christian School gymnasium: The school has the most football state championships in LHSAA history

| Nº | School | Municipality | Parish | Season(s) | Note(s) |
|---|---|---|---|---|---|
| 27 | John Curtis Christian Patriots | River Ridge | Jefferson | 1975, 1977, 1979, 1980, 1981, 1983, 1984, 1985, 1987, 1988, 1990, 1993, 1996, 1997, 1998, 1999, 2001, 2002, 2004, 2005, 2006, 2007, 2008, 2011, 2012, ~~2013~~, 2018, 2022 | presumably eligible for 2017 championship that Baton Rouge Catholic forfeited, based upon past precedent |
| 18 | Haynesville Golden Tornado | Haynesville | Claiborne | 1924, 1929, 1936, 1970, 1971, 1984, 1987, 1990, 1991, 1993, 1994, 1995, 1996, 2000, 2009, 2013, 2014, 2025 | |
| 14 | Evangel Christian Academy Eagles | Shreveport | Caddo | 1993, 1994, 1996, 1997, 1998, 1999, 2001, 2002, 2004, 2005, 2006, 2009, 2010, 2016 | |
| 12 | Neville Tigers | Monroe | Ouachita | 1955, 1959, 1961, 1962, 1972, 1983, 1984, 1995, 2009, 2011, 2014, 2015 | |
| 11 | Southern Lab Kittens | Baton Rouge | East Baton Rouge | 1941, 1947, 1949, 1965, 1968, 1980, 1982, 1986, 1996, ~~2015~~, ~~2016~~, 2021, 2023 | won in 1941, 1947, and 1949 as Southern High |
| 10 | C. E. Byrd Yellow Jackets | Shreveport | Caddo | 1914, 1915, 1922, 1926, 1930, 1931, 1934, 1935, 1937, 1949 | won in 1914, 1915, and 1922 as Shreveport High; presumably eligible for 2020 championship that Baton Rouge Catholic forfeited, based upon past precedent |
| 10 | Istrouma Indians | Baton Rouge | East Baton Rouge | 1938, 1950, 1951, 1955, 1956, 1957, 1958, 1959, 1961, 1962 | |
| 10 | Riverside Academy Rebels | Reserve | St. John the Baptist | 1972, 1973, 1975, 1980, 1983, 1984, 1985, 1986, 2016, 2025 | |
| 9 | Christian Home Educators Fellowship Patriots | Baton Rouge | East Baton Rouge | 2006, 2007, 2013, 2014, 2015, 2016, 2023, 2024, 2025 | |
| 9 | Kentwood Kangaroos | Kentwood | Tangipahoa | 1928, 1939, 1969, 1983, 1986, 1997, 1998, 2015, 2018 | |
| 9 | Lutcher Bulldogs | Lutcher | St. James | 1975, 1978, 1983, 2003, 2006, 2008, 2015, 2016, 2022 | |
| 9 | Ruston Bearcats | Ruston | Lincoln | 1925, 1941, 1947, 1951, 1982, 1986, 1988, 1990, 2023 | |
| 9 | Tallulah Trojans | Tallulah | Madison | 1932, 1933, 1934, 1946, 1948, 1957, 1958, 1960, 1961 | |
| 9 | Warren Easton Eagles | New Orleans | Orleans | 1912, 1914, 1915, 1916, 1917, 1918, 1920, 1921, 1942 | |
| 8 | Baton Rouge Golden Bulldogs | Baton Rouge | East Baton Rouge | 1909, 1911, 1913, 1914, 1917, 1919, 1944, 1964 | |
| 8 | Edna Karr Cougars | New Orleans | Orleans | 1993, 2012, 2016, 2017, 2018, 2019, 2024, 2025 | |
| 8 | Jesuit Blue Jays | New Orleans | Orleans | 1933, 1940, 1941, 1943, 1946, 1953, 1960, 2014 | |
| 8 | Oak Grove Tigers | Oak Grove | West Carroll | 1989, 1991, 1999, 2001, 2019, 2020, 2022, 2023 | |
| 8 | Ouachita Christian Eagles | Monroe | Ouachita | 1985, 1997, 2000, 2011, 2012, 2014, 2019, 2022 | |
| 8 | University Lab Cubs | Baton Rouge | East Baton Rouge | 1957, 1974, 1988, 2013, 2014, 2017, 2018, 2021 | |
| 8 | West Monroe Rebels | West Monroe | Ouachita | 1993, 1996, 1997, 1998, 2000, 2005, 2009, 2011 | |
| 6 | Acadiana Wreckin' Rams | Lafayette | Lafayette | 2006, 2010, 2013, 2014, 2019, 2020 | |
| 6 | Acadiana Christian Athletics Defenders | Lafayette | Lafayette | 2017, 2018, 2019, 2020, 2021, 2022 | |
| 6 | Amite Warriors | Amite City | Tangipahoa | 1963, 1994, 1999, 2004, 2018, 2021 | |
| 6 | Hahnville Tigers | Boutte | St. Charles | 1949, 1968, 1972, 1992, 1994, 2003 | |
| 6 | McKinley Panthers | Baton Rouge | East Baton Rouge | 1926, 1927, 1929, 1940, 1942, 1954 | won in 1926 as Baton Rouge Colored High |
| 6 | Notre Dame Pioneers | Crowley | Acadia | 1973, 1976, 2000, 2009, 2015, 2018 | |
| 6 | St. Augustine Purple Knights | New Orleans | Orleans | 1963, 1965, 1966, 1975, 1978, 1979 | |
| 6 | St. James Wildcats | Vacherie | St. James | 1958, 1959, 1960, 1966, 1979, 2019 | |
| 5 | Destrehan Fighting Wildcats | Destrehan | St. Charles | 1949, 1973, 2007, 2008, 2022 | |
| 5 | Ferriday Trojans | Ferriday | Concordia | 1953, 1954, 1955, 1956, 2019 | |
| 5 | Homer Fighting Pelicans | Homer | Claiborne | 1923, 1928, 1937, 1939, 2021 | |
| 5 | Jonesboro–Hodge Tigers | Jonesboro | Jackson | 1930, 1945, 1987, 1988, 1989 | won in 1930 as Jonesboro High |
| 5 | Minden Crimson Tide | Minden | Webster | 1938, 1954, 1956, 1963, 1980 | |
| 5 | Parkview Baptist Eagles | Baton Rouge | East Baton Rouge | 2001, 2007, 2010, 2012, 2015 | |
| 5 | St. Thomas More Catholic Cougars | Lafayette | Lafayette | 2016, 2019, 2020, 2022, 2023 | |
| 4 | Calvary Baptist Academy Cavaliers | Shreveport | Caddo | 2013, 2014, 2020, 2023 | |
| 4 | Carroll Bulldogs | Monroe | Ouachita | 1953, 1961, 1962, 1968 | |
| 4 | Central Memorial Spartans | Bogalusa | Washington | 1938, 1939, 1945, 1946, ~~1961~~ | won in 1938 and 1939 as Central High |
| 4 | Claiborne Academy Rebels | Haynesville | Claiborne | 1981, 1987, 1990, 2004 | |
| 4 | Kinder Yellow Jackets | Kinder | Allen | 1967, 1978, 2013, 2015 | |
| 4 | Lake Charles Wildcats | Lake Charles | Calcasieu | 1910, 1932, 1954, 1958 | |
| 4 | Lafayette Christian Academy Knights | Lafayette | Lafayette | 2017, 2018, 2019, 2020 | |
| 4 | Redemptorist Wolves | Baton Rouge | East Baton Rouge | 1959, 2002, 2003, 2005 | |
| 4 | Richwood Rams | Monroe | Ouachita | 1962, 1963, 1964, 1974 | |
| 4 | Riverfield Academy Raiders | Rayville | Richland | 1977, 1991, 2019, 2020 | |
| 4 | St. Charles Catholic Comets | LaPlace | St. John the Baptist | 2011, 2021, 2022, 2025 | |
| 4 | Silliman Institute Wildcats | Clinton | East Feliciana | 1974, 1996, 2001, 2015 | |
| 4 | Sterlington Panthers | Monroe | Ouachita | 2016, 2021, 2024, 2025 | |
| 4 | Sulphur Golden Tornadoes | Sulphur | Calcasieu | 1943, 1944, 1946, 1965 | |
| 4 | Tallulah Academy Trojans | Tallulah | Madison | 1972, 1979, 1980, 1992 | |
| 4 | Tensas Academy Chiefs | St. Joseph | Tensas | 1971, 1977, 1978, 1982 | |
| 4 | West St. John Rams | Edgard | St. John the Baptist | 1998, 2003, 2004, 2017 | consolidation of Edgard High and Second Ward High |
| 4 | Xavier Prep Yellow Jackets | New Orleans | Orleans | 1936, 1937, 1940, 1941 | |
| 4 | Zachary Broncos | Zachary | East Baton Rouge | 2015, 2017, 2018, 2021 | |
| 3 | Archbishop Rummel Raiders | Metairie | Jefferson | 2012, 2013, 2019 | |
| 3 | Ascension Catholic Bulldogs | Donaldsonville | Ascension | 1941, 1973, 1992 | won in 1941 as Donaldsonville Catholic High |
| 3 | Bastrop Rams | Bastrop | Morehouse | 1927, ~~2005~~, 2006, 2007 | |
| 3 | Booker T. Washington Lions | Shreveport | Caddo | 1951, 1952, 1964 | |
| 3 | Briarfield Academy Rebels | Lake Providence | East Carroll | 1979, 1989, 1991 | |
| 3 | Carter G. Woodson Tigers | Haynesville | Claiborne | 1951, 1954, 1955 | won in 1951, 1954, and 1955 as Haynesville Colored High |
| 3 | Catholic Bears | Baton Rouge | East Baton Rouge | 2015, ~~2017~~, ~~2020~~, 2021, 2023 | |
| 3 | Catholic Panthers | New Iberia | Iberia | 1962, 2017, 2024 | |
| 3 | Clinton Eagles | Clinton | East Feliciana | 1950, 1962, 1968 | |
| 3 | DeSoto Tigers | Mansfield | DeSoto | 1956, 1957, 1958 | |
| 3 | Grand Avenue Tigers | DeQuincy | Calcasieu | 1958, 1965, 1966 | |
| 3 | Jennings Bulldogs | Jennings | Jefferson Davis | 1908, 1939, 1992 | |
| 3 | Lincoln Black Bears | Ruston | Lincoln | 1928, 1943, 1948 | |
| 3 | Many Tigers | Many | Sabine | 2014, 2020, 2022 | |
| 3 | Oak Forest Academy Yellow Jackets | Amite City | Tangipahoa | 2002, 2014, 2022 | |
| 3 | Plain Dealing Academy Lions | Plain Dealing | Bossier | 1981, 1986, 1988 | |
| 3 | Port Sulphur Bronchos | Port Sulphur | Plaquemines | 1979, 1981, 2002 | consolidated into South Plaquemines High |
| 3 | River Oaks Mustangs | Monroe | Ouachita | 1990, 2005, 2010 | |
| 3 | Salmen Spartans | Slidell | St. Tammany | 1994, 1995, 2000 | |
| 3 | South Plaquemines Hurricanes | Buras | Plaquemines | 2007, 2008, 2024 | consolidation of Boothville–Venice High, Buras High, and Porth Sulphur High |
| 3 | Union Parish Fightin' Farmers | Farmerville | Union | 2001, 2013, 2023 | won in 2001 as Farmerville High |
| 3 | Vermilion Catholic Eagles | Abbeville | Vermilion | 2003, 2013, 2024 | |
| 3 | Vernon Lions | Leesville | Vernon | 1963, 1967, 1968 | |
| 3 | W. O. Boston Panthers | Lake Charles | Calcasieu | 1950, 1958, 1972 | |
| 2 | Arcadia Hornets | Arcadia | Bienville | 1940, 1965 | |
| 2 | Archbishop Shaw Eagles | Marrero | Jefferson | 1987, 2024 | |
| 2 | Baker Buffaloes | Baker | East Baton Rouge | 1947, 1950 | |
| 2 | Bogalusa Lumberjacks | Bogalusa | Washington | 1947, 1969 | |
| 2 | Booker T. Washington Lions | New Orleans | Orleans | 1949, 1950 | |
| 2 | Bossier Bearkats | Bossier City | Bossier | 1942, 1948 | |
| 2 | Bowling Green Buccaneers | Franklinton | Washington | 1983, 1997 | |
| 2 | Buras Wildcats | Buras | Plaquemines | 1966, 1990 | consolidated into South Plaquemines High |
| 2 | Carencro Bears | Lafayette | Lafayette | 1992, 2020 | |
| 2 | Cecilia Bulldogs | Cecilia | St. Martin | 1995, 2024 | |
| 2 | Central Wildcats | Central | East Baton Rouge | 1966, 2024 | |
| 2 | Charlotte A. Mitchell Grizzly Bears | Bossier City | Bossier | 1947, 1948 | won in 1947 and 1948 as Bossier City Colored High |
| 2 | Covenant Christian Academy Lions | Houma | Terrebonne | 2010, 2011 | |
| 2 | Delhi Bears | Delhi | Richland | 1951, 1957 | |
| 2 | Dunham Tigers | St. George | East Baton Rouge | 2004, 2025 | |
| 2 | East St. John Wildcats | Reserve | St. John the Baptist | 1958, 1980 | won in 1958 as Godchaux High |
| 2 | E. D. White Catholic Cardinals | Thibodaux | Lafourche | 1968, 1969 | |
| 2 | Eunice Bobcats | Eunice | St. Landry | 1982, 2018 | |
| 2 | Holy Cross Tigers | New Orleans | Orleans | 1945, 1963 | |
| 2 | John Ehret Patriots | Marrero | Jefferson | 1981, 1985 | |
| 2 | Landry Memorial Tigers | Lake Charles | Calcasieu | 1942, 1965 | |
| 2 | Lockport Pirates | Lockport | Lafourche | 1963, 1964 | |
| 2 | Logansport Tigers | Logansport | DeSoto | 1995, 2016 | |
| 2 | Loyola Prep Flyers | Shreveport | Caddo | 1967, 1976 | won in 1967 and 1976 as Jesuit High |
| 2 | Morgan City Tigers | Morgan City | St. Mary | 1923, 1957 | |
| 2 | Notre Dame Bloodhounds | Shreveport | Caddo | 1961, 1962 | |
| 2 | Ouachita Parish Lions | Monroe | Ouachita | 1989, 2025 | |
| 2 | Pinecrest Yellow Jackets | Winnfield | Winn | 1950, 1951 | won in 1950 and 1951 as Winn Training |
| 2 | Rayville Hornets | Rayville | Richland | 1929, 1931 | |
| 2 | Richardson Bears | West Monroe | Ouachita | 1966, 1967 | |
| 2 | Ridgedale Academy Raiders | West Monroe | Ouachita | 1984, 1987 | |
| 2 | St. Martinville Tigers | St. Martinville | St. Martin | 1981, 1984 | |
| 2 | St. Mary's Catholic Tigers | Natchitoches | Natchitoches | 1977, 2015 | |
| 2 | Second Ward Eagles | Edgard | St. John the Baptist | 1971, 1972 | consolidated into West St. John High |
| 2 | Slidell Tigers | Slidell | St. Tammany | 1944, 1945 | |
| 2 | South Lafourche Tarpons | Galliano | Lafourche | 1971, 1977 | consolidation of LaRose–Cut Off High and Golden Meadow High |
| 2 | Southwood Academy Spartans | Hammond | Tangipahoa | 1974, 1978 | |
| 2 | Springhill Bulldogs | Springhill | Webster | 1952, 1985 | |
| 2 | Valley Forge Academy Rebels | Amite City | Tangipahoa | 1970, 1982 | |
| 2 | Vinton Lions | Vinton | Calcasieu | 1935, 1936 | |
| 1 | Acadiana Home School Athletics Commandos | Lafayette | Lafayette | 2012 | |
| 1 | Airline Vikings | Bossier City | Bossier | 1967 | |
| 1 | Alcée Fortier Tarpons | New Orleans | Orleans | 1948 | |
| 1 | Ascension Episcopal Blue Gators | Youngsville | Lafayette | 2016 | |
| 1 | Assumption Mustangs | Napoleonville | Assumption | 1964 | |
| 1 | Belle Chasse Cardinals | Belle Chasse | Plaquemines | 2008 | |
| 1 | Belmont Academy Eagles | Opelousas | St. Landry | 1975 | |
| 1 | Breaux Bridge Tigers | Breaux Bridge | St. Martin | 2005 | |
| 1 | Breaux Bridge Christian Academy Knights | Breaux Bridge | St. Martin | 2009 | |
| 1 | Broadmoor Buccaneers | Baton Rouge | East Baton Rouge | 1966 | |
| 1 | Brother Martin Crusaders | New Orleans | Orleans | 1971 | |
| 1 | Capitol Golden Lions | Baton Rouge | East Baton Rouge | 1955 | won in 1955 as Capitol Avenue High |
| 1 | Captain Shreve Gators | Shreveport | Caddo | 1973 | |
| 1 | Catholic Hornets | New Roads | Pointe Coupee | 1978 | |
| 1 | Columbia Crimson Tide | Columbia | Caldwell | 1937 | |
| 1 | Coushatta Choctaws | Coushatta | Red River | 1992 | |
| 1 | Covington Fighting Lions | Covington | St. Tammany | 1976 | |
| 1 | Crowley Fighting Gents | Crowley | Acadia | 1989 | |
| 1 | Cypress Grove Bobcats | Lutcher | St. James | 1953 | |
| 1 | Donaldsonville Tigers | Donaldsonville | Ascension | 1954 | |
| 1 | East Tigers | Clinton | East Feliciana | 1957 | won in 1957 as East Feliciana Industrial Training |
| 1 | East Ascension Academy Broncos | Gonzales | Ascension | 1976 | |
| 1 | East Jefferson Warriors | Metairie | Jefferson | 2013 | |
| 1 | Eastside Demons | Farmerville | Union | 1969 | consolidation of Marion Industrial and Union Parish Training |
| 1 | Elliot Giants | Bernice | Union | 1949 | won in 1949 as Bernice Colored High; consolidated into Westside High |
| 1 | Elton Indians | Elton | Jefferson Davis | 1970 | |
| 1 | Fair Park Indians | Shreveport | Caddo | 1952 | |
| 1 | False River Academy Gators | New Roads | Pointe Coupee | 1989 | |
| 1 | First Baptist Academy Patriots | Shreveport | Caddo | 1985 | |
| 1 | Franklinton Demons | Franklinton | Washington | 2010 | |
| 1 | Gilbert Demons | Gilbert | Franklin | 1975 | |
| 1 | Glenbrook Academy Apaches | Minden | Webster | 2007 | |
| 1 | Greensburg Tigers | Greensburg | St. Helena | 1958 | |
| 1 | Hammond Tornadoes | Hammond | Tangipahoa | 1970 | |
| 1 | Hanson Memorial Tigers | Franklin | St. Mary | 1976 | |
| 1 | Haughton Buccaneers | Haughton | Bossier | 1977 | |
| 1 | Holy Name Blue Knights | New Orleans | Orleans | 1955 | |
| 1 | Huntington Hounds | Ferriday | Concordia | 1971 | |
| 1 | Iota Bulldogs | Iota | Acadia | 1999 | |
| 1 | Iowa Yellow Jackets | Iowa | Calcasieu | 2025 | |
| 1 | Jackson Wahas | Jonesboro | Jackson | 1952 | won in 1952 as Jonesboro Colored High |
| 1 | Jefferson College Blue Backs | Convent | St. James | 1907 | |
| 1 | Kenner Thunderbolts | Kenner | Jefferson | 1952 | |
| 1 | L. B. Landry Buccaneers | New Orleans | Orleans | 1959 | consolidated into Landry–Walker Prep |
| 1 | LaGrange Gators | Lake Charles | Calcasieu | 1938 | |
| 1 | Landry–Walker Prep Charging Buccaneers | New Orleans | Orleans | 2016 | consolidation of L. B. Landry High and O. Perry Walker High |
| 1 | Larose–Cut Off Bulldogs | Larose | Lafourche | 1965 | consolidated into South Lafourche High |
| 1 | Lighthouse Christian Prep Eagles | Abbeville | Vermilion | 2008 | |
| 1 | Lincoln Trojans | Marrero | Jefferson | 1967 | |
| 1 | Livonia Wildcats | Livonia | Pointe Coupee | 2014 | |
| 1 | Madison Prep Academy Chargers | Baton Rouge | East Baton Rouge | 2020 | |
| 1 | Mangham Dragons | Mangham | Richland | 1956 | |
| 1 | Mansfield Wolverines | Mansfield | DeSoto | 1991 | |
| 1 | Marion Industrial Golden Lions | Marion | Union | 1957 | Consolidated into Eastside High |
| 1 | Mayfield Raiders | Homer | Claiborne | 1961 | |
| 1 | Morehouse Tigers | Bastrop | Morehouse | 1959 | |
| 1 | Mossville Pirates | Westlake | Calcasieu | 1960 | |
| 1 | Natchitoches Red Devils | Natchitoches | Natchitoches | 1969 | |
| 1 | Natchitoches Academy Trojans | Natchitoches | Natchitoches | 1973 | |
| 1 | Northwestern Braves | Zachary | East Baton Rouge | 1956 | |
| 1 | Oberlin Tigers | Oberlin | Allen | 1961 | |
| 1 | Opelousas Tigers | Opelousas | St. Landry | 2023 | |
| 1 | Opelousas Catholic Vikings | Opelousas | St. Landry | 1974 | |
| 1 | Pineville Rebels | Pineville | Rapides | 1960 | |
| 1 | Ponchatoula Green Wave | Ponchatoula | Tangipahoa | 1940 | |
| 1 | Port Barre Red Devils | Port Barre | St. Landry | 2002 | |
| 1 | Prairie View Academy Spartans | Bastrop | Morehouse | 1988 | |
| 1 | Princeton Dragons | Princeton | Bossier | 1969 | |
| 1 | Ridgewood Prep Golden Eagles | Metairie | Jefferson | 1964 | |
| 1 | Sacred Heart Trojans | Ville Platte | Evangeline | 1967 | |
| 1 | Sam Barthe Hornets | Metairie | Jefferson | 1976 | |
| 1 | Scotlandville Hornets | Baton Rouge | East Baton Rouge | 1969 | |
| 1 | South Terrebonne Gators | Bourg | Terrebonne | 1991 | |
| 1 | Tara Trojans | Baton Rouge | East Baton Rouge | 1974 | |
| 1 | Thibodaux Tigers | Thibodaux | Lafourche | 1991 | |
| 1 | Thomas A. Levy Tigers | Rosedale | Iberville | 1960 | |
| 1 | Vandebilt Catholic Fightin' Terriers | Houma | Terrebonne | 1959 | won in 1959 as St. Francis |
| 1 | Washington Indians | Lake Charles | Calcasieu | 1960 | |
| 1 | Waterproof Tigers | Waterproof | Tensas | 1943 | |
| 1 | Welsh Greyhounds | Welsh | Jefferson Davis | 2017 | |
| 1 | Wesley Ray Eagles | Angie | Washington | 1964 | |
| 1 | West Feliciana Saints | St. Francisville | West Feliciana | 2017 | |
| 1 | West Jefferson Buccaneers | Harvey | Jefferson | 1970 | |
| 1 | Westgate Tigers | New Iberia | Iberia | 2021 | |
| 1 | Westlake Rams | Westlake | Calcasieu | 1953 | |
| 1 | Westside Tigers | Lillie | Union | 1959 | consolidation of Douglas High and Elliot High |
| 1 | White Castle Bulldogs | White Castle | Iberville | 2010 | |
| 1 | Winnfield Tigers | Winnfield | Winn | 1982 | |
| 1 | Woodlawn Knights | Shreveport | Caddo | 1968 | |
| 1 | Wossman Wildcats | Monroe | Ouachita | 1986 | |

== National championships by school ==
Several Louisiana high schools have also won national championships.

The state of Louisiana itself actually had a direct impact on several early high school national crowns as the Louisiana Sports Association hosted a series of games at Tiger Stadium in Baton Rouge called the "National High School Championship" in 1938 and 1939, the latter of which included an appearance by Louisiana's own Baton Rouge High. McKinley had the chance to host a similar national championship game for black schools but, after deciding against participating in the postseason, went to watch the Baton Rouge High game instead.

Acadiana Christian Athletics of Lafayette and the Louisiana School for the Deaf of Baton Rouge won national titles reserved specifically for homeschooled students and deaf schools respectively.

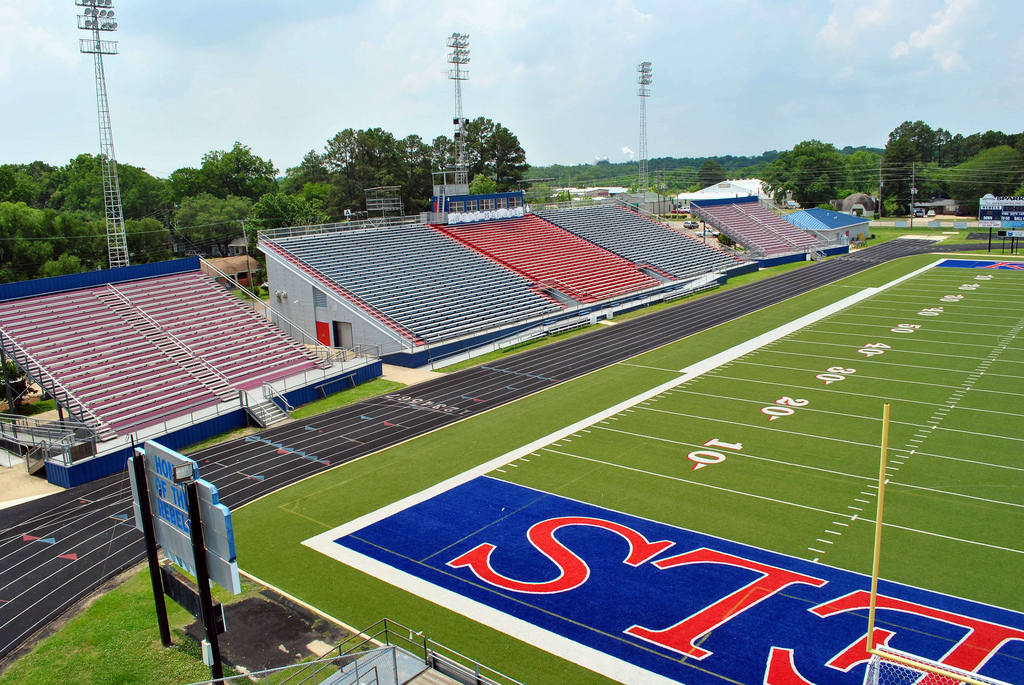
Rebel Stadium at West Monroe High School: The school has the most football national championships in LHSAA history

| Nº | School | Municipality | Parish | Season(s) |
|---|---|---|---|---|
| 4 | Acadiana Christian Athletics Defenders | Lafayette | Lafayette | 2019, 2020, 2021, 2022 |
| 2 | West Monroe Rebels | West Monroe | Ouachita | 1998, 2000 |
| 1 | Bogalusa Lumberjacks | Bogalusa | Washington | 1969 |
| 1 | Evangel Christian Academy Eagles | Shreveport | Caddo | 1999 |
| 1 | John Curtis Christian Patriots | River Ridge | Jefferson | 2012 |
| 1 | Louisiana School for the Deaf Mustangs | Baton Rouge | East Baton Rouge | 1961 |
| 1 | Ruston Bearcats | Ruston | Lincoln | 1990 |

== Team and coaching superlatives ==
Nineteen different schools in the parish of East Baton Rouge have won 80 total titles, including 14 different schools within the city limits of Baton Rouge that have won 69 total titles (this city total does not include, however, 4 championships later forfeited—or any won by Central High or Dunham, which used Baton Rouge postal ZIP Codes in the past but are now considered part of the newly-incorporated cities of Central and St. George respectively).

Curtis is the school with the most championships (27), and Lafayette Acadiana Christian Athletics is the school with the most consecutive championships (6). Haynesville is the public school with the most championships (18)—and most consecutive LHSAA championships (4), tied with Ferriday and Edna Karr of New Orleans (although Istrouma as a public school actually won 5 consecutive crowns when counting its 1955, 1956, 1957, and 1959 LHSAA titles along with its top-place finish in the 1958 Louisiana Prep Grid Standard final postseason rankings). Istrouma is the school with the most championships within the LHSAA's highest classification (9). Curtis is now a member of the New Orleans Catholic League, a district within the LHSAA that is well-represented on the listings above.

Long-term successful teams like Curtis, Haynesville, and Istrouma are known for having programs with extensive family ties. Curtis' head coach, John T. Curtis Jr.—the second-winningest head coach in high school football history—is the son of the school's founder and has had numerous family members serve as assistant coaches or players for the team. He has also won more state championships than any other coach in the country. Haynesville has had a very successful transition of its head coaching position from Red Franklin to his son, David. Istrouma similarly had a very successful transition of its head coaching position from Ellis A. "Little Fuzzy" Brown to his twin brother, James E. "Big Fuzzy" Brown. In addition, Robert Andrew "Racer" Holstead, Sr., formerly the winningest high school football head coach in the state, coached Tallulah High to four LHSAA football championships, Tallulah Academy to three LISA championships and one MAIS championship—and even Plaquemine to one LHSAA basketball championship; recently his grandson, Chad Mahaffey, also coached University Lab to four state championships. Like Holstead, Baton Rouge Christian Home Educators Fellowship (LCSAA, ACEL, and LIFT), Easton (Times–Picayune, National Farm and Live Stock Show, and LHSAA), and Southern Lab (LIALA, LIALO, and LHSAA) have also won trophies from three different sources.

Records from schools and coaches with documented all-time won–loss standings, however, indicate that having programs among the winningest in the state does not necessarily always correlate with earning state championships. For example, among the 600-win and 300-win clubs for teams and coaches respectively:

| Nº | School | Years | Wins | Losses | Ties | Pct. | State championship(s) |
|---|---|---|---|---|---|---|---|
| 1 | Haynesville | 1907–2025 | 882 | 312 | 34 | .732 | 18 |
| 2 | Monroe/Neville | 1931–2025 | 809 | 270 | 20 | .745 | 12 |
| 3 | New Orleans/Jesuit | 1895–2025 | 757 | 380 | 34 | .661 | 8 |
| 4 | Shreveport/Byrd | 1905–2025 | 697 | 449 | 35 | .605 | 9 |
| 5 | River Ridge/John Curtis Christian * | 1963–2025 | 635 | 82 | 6 | .882 | 28 |
| 6 | Winnfield | 1909–2025 | 625 | 469 | 36 | .569 | 1 |

Note: *—school ordered to forfeit 30 wins and 1 state championship by LHSAA

| Nº | Coach | School(s) | Years | Wins | Losses | Tie(s) | Pct. | State championship(s) |
|---|---|---|---|---|---|---|---|---|
| 1 | John T. Curtis Jr. * | River Ridge/John Curtis Christian | 54 | 642 | 88 | 6 | .876 | 28 |
| 2 | Jim Hightower | New Roads/Catholic | 51 | 490 | 142 | 1 | .775 | 6 |
| 2 | Jim Hightower | Lafayette/St. Thomas More Catholic | 51 | 490 | 142 | 1 | .775 | 6 |
| 3 | Lewis Cook | Rayne | 40 | 407 | 101 | 0 | .801 | 5 |
| 3 | Lewis Cook | Crowley | 40 | 407 | 101 | 0 | .801 | 5 |
| 3 | Lewis Cook | Crowley/Notre Dame | 40 | 407 | 101 | 0 | .801 | 5 |
| 4 | Red Franklin | Haynesville | 35 | 365 | 75 | 9 | .823 | 11 |
| 5 | Don Shows | Farmerville | 32 | 345 | 78 | 0 | .817 | 8 |
| 5 | Don Shows | Jonesboro–Hodge | 32 | 345 | 78 | 0 | .817 | 8 |
| 5 | Don Shows | Pineville | 32 | 345 | 78 | 0 | .817 | 8 |
| 5 | Don Shows | West Monroe | 32 | 345 | 78 | 0 | .817 | 8 |
| 6 | Hank Tierney | Marrero/Shaw | 33 | 331 | 128 | 0 | .721 | 2 |
| 6 | Hank Tierney | Harvey/West Jefferson | 33 | 331 | 128 | 0 | .721 | 2 |
| 6 | Hank Tierney | Ponchatoula | 33 | 331 | 128 | 0 | .721 | 2 |
| 6 | Hank Tierney | Marrero/Shaw | 33 | 331 | 128 | 0 | .721 | 2 |
| 7 | Vic Dalrymple | Oak Grove | 32 | 320 | 99 | 0 | .763 | 4 |
| 8 | Dale Weiner | Plaquemine/St. John | 35 | 317 | 109 | 0 | .744 | 1 |
| 8 | Dale Weiner | St. George/Trafton | 35 | 317 | 109 | 0 | .744 | 1 |
| 8 | Dale Weiner | New Roads/Catholic | 35 | 317 | 109 | 0 | .744 | 1 |
| 8 | Dale Weiner | Baton Rouge/Catholic | 35 | 317 | 109 | 0 | .744 | 1 |
| 9 | Racer Holstead | Tallulah | 40 | 309 | 146 | 8 | .676 | 8 |
| 9 | Racer Holstead | Tallulah Academy | 40 | 309 | 146 | 8 | .676 | 8 |

Note: *—school ordered to forfeit 30 wins and 1 state championship by LHSAA

== Six-man, eight-man, and flag football championships ==
The LHSAA, LCSAA, MPSA/MAIS, ACEL, and Arkansas Louisiana Christian Athletic League (ALCAL) have each sanctioned championship play for six-man or eight-man football in Louisiana over the years.

The LHSAA transitioned from six-man to eight-man in 1964. However, eight-man football was discontinued by the LHSAA after only four seasons as school administrators figured that if teams were increasing to eight players any way, then they might as well continue on to a full eleven-man roster. With desegregation also ongoing, some schools may have expected an influx of newly-available student athletes as well.

It is not immediately clear exactly which individual seasons that the old LCSAA and ALCAL associations offered six-man or eight-man football as a competitive sport. In at least one case, for the 2006 season, ALCAL used the final regular season standings to determine the organization's six-man title. However, at least one postseason (2008) saw ALCAL holding separate eight-man state championship games for both Louisiana and Arkansas and then pairing the winners of those games in a matchup for ALCAL's overall championship (which was won by the Arkansas school).

The LCSAA began sanctioning flag football in 1986. However, the LCSAA added 11-man tackle football in 2006 and discontinued flag football after that 2006 season, replacing it with 8-man tackle football.

As part of outreach efforts by the National Football League, the New Orleans Saints NFL franchise has sponsored a state championship tournament for Louisiana high school girls' flag football teams. The LHSAA has agreed to begin administering the tournament starting with the 2027 spring semester.

Lafayette Christian Academy has managed to acquire state trophies in each of the flag, six-man, eight-man, and eleven-man versions of the sport.

=== Six-man state championships by year ===
| Year | Unsponsored State Championship Game |
|---|---|
| 1939 | Greenwood |

| Year | LHSAA |
|---|---|
| 1940 | Buras |
| 1941 | Destrehan |
| 1942 | Geismar/Dutchtown |
| 1943 | Jeanerette |
| 1944 | Rayne |

| Year | LHSAA Class A | LHSAA Class B |
|---|---|---|
| 1945 | Lafayette/Cathedral | New Iberia/St. Peter's |

| Year | LHSAA |
|---|---|
| 1946 | Ville Platte/Sacred Heart |

| Year | LHSAA Class A | LHSAA Class B |
|---|---|---|
| 1947 | Kaplan | Ville Platte/Sacred Heart |

| Year | LHSAA |
|---|---|
| 1948 | St. Martinville |

| Year | LHSAA Class A | LHSAA Class B |
|---|---|---|
| 1949 | Church Point * | Geismar/Dutchtown |

Note: *—possible championship game opponents declined to challenge, so association declared champion instead

| Year | LHSAA |
|---|---|
| 1950 | Basile |
| 1951 | Buras |
| 1952 | Larose–Cutoff |
| 1953 | Basile |
| 1954 | Iota |
| 1955 | Morganza |
| 1956 | Livonia |
| 1957 | St. Gabriel |
| 1958 | St. Gabriel |
| 1959 | Clinton/Woodland |
| 1960 | Clinton/Woodland |
| 1961 | Clinton/Woodland |
| 1962 | Livonia |
| 1963 | Livonia |

| Year | LCSAA * |
|---|---|
| 1984 | |
| 1985 | |
| 1986 | |
| 1987 | |
| 1988 | |
| 1989 | |
| 1990 | |
| 1991 | |
| 1992 | |
| 1993 | |
| 1994 | |

Note: *—it is not immediately clear which, if any, of these seasons that the association sponsored six-man football as an official league sport

| Year | LCSAA * | ALCAL (if won by a Louisiana school) ** |
|---|---|---|
| 1995 | | |
| 1996 | | |
| 1997 | | |
| 1998 | | |
| 1999 | | |
| 2000 | | |
| 2001 | | |
| 2002 | | |
| 2003 | | |
| 2004 | | |
| 2005 | | |
| 2006 | | (none) † |
| 2007 | | |
| 2008 | | |

Notes: *—it is not immediately clear which, if any, of these seasons that the association sponsored six-man football as an official league sport; **—it is not immediately clear which of these seasons, besides 2006, that the association sponsored six-man football as an official league sport; †—regular season standings not won by a Louisiana school

| Year | LCSAA * |
|---|---|
| 2009 | Lafayette Christian |
| 2010 | |
| 2011 | |

Note: *—it is not immediately clear which of these seasons, besides 2009, that the association sponsored six-man football as an official league sport

=== Six-man state championships by school * ** ===
Notes: *—although most ALCAL and MPSA/MAIS championships are not, strictly speaking, "state" championships per se, those titles are included with these totals for comparative purposes; **—most recent school name is used, when available

| Nº | School | Municipality | Parish | Year(s) | Note(s) |
|---|---|---|---|---|---|
| 3 | Livonia Wildcats | Livonia | Pointe Coupee | 1956, 1962, 1963 | |
| 3 | Woodland Bulldogs | Clinton | East Feliciana | 1959, 1960, 1961 | |
| 2 | Basile Bearcats | Basile | Evangeline | 1950, 1953 | |
| 2 | Buras Wildcats | Buras | Plaquemines | 1940, 1951 | |
| 2 | Dutchtown Eagles | Geismar | Ascension | 1942, 1949 | not to be confused with contemporary Dutchtown High; consolidated into East Ascension High |
| 2 | Sacred Heart Trojans | Ville Platte | Evangeline | 1946, 1947 | |
| 2 | St. Gabriel Broncos | St. Gabriel | Iberville | 1957, 1958 | |
| 1 | Cathedral–Carmel Tigers | Lafayette | Lafayette | 1945 | won in 1945 as Cathedral High |
| 1 | Church Point Bears | Church Point | Acadia | 1949 | |
| 1 | Destrehan Fighting Wildcats | Destrehan | St. Charles | 1941 | |
| 1 | Greenwood Frogs | Greenwood | Caddo | 1939 | |
| 1 | Iota Bulldogs | Iota | Acadia | 1954 | |
| 1 | Jeanerette Tigers | Jeanerette | Iberia | 1943 | |
| 1 | Kaplan Pirates | Kaplan | Vermilion | 1947 | |
| 1 | Lafayette Christian Academy Knights | Lafayette | Lafayette | 2009 | |
| 1 | Larose–Cutoff Bulldogs | Larose | Lafourche | 1952 | consolidated into South Lafourche High |
| 1 | Morganza Tigers | Morganza | Pointe Coupee | 1955 | |
| 1 | Rayne Wolves | Rayne | Acadia | 1944 | |
| 1 | St. Martinville Tigers | St. Martinville | St. Martin | 1948 | |
| 1 | Catholic Panthers | New Iberia | Iberia | 1945 | won in 1945 as St. Peter's |

=== Eight-man state championships by year ===
| Year | LHSAA |
|---|---|
| 1964 | Livonia |
| 1965 | Livonia |
| 1966 | White Castle |
| 1967 | Clinton/Woodland |

| Year | ALCAL (if won by a Louisiana school) * |
|---|---|
| 1995 | |
| 1996 | |
| 1997 | |
| 1998 | |
| 1999 | |
| 2000 | |
| 2001 | |
| 2002 | |
| 2003 | |
| 2004 | |
| 2005 | |
| 2006 | |

Note: *—it is not immediately clear which, if any, of these seasons that the association sponsored eight-man football as an official league sport

| Year | MPSA (if won by a Louisiana school) | LCSAA | ALCAL (if won by a Louisiana school) * |
|---|---|---|---|
| 2007 | (none) ** | | |
| 2008 | (none) ** | | Louisiana: West Monroe/Northeast Baptist |
| 2008 | (none) ** | | Overall: (none) ** |

Notes: *—it is not immediately clear which of these seasons, besides 2008, that the association sponsored eight-man football as an official league sport; **—championship game not won by a Louisiana school

| Year | MAIS (if won by a Louisiana school) | LCSAA |
|---|---|---|
| 2009 | (none) * | |
| 2010 | (none) * | Lafayette Christian |
| 2011 | St. Joseph/Tensas Academy | Abbeville/Harvest Time Christian |

Notes: *—championship game not won by a Louisiana school

| Year | MAIS (if won by a Louisiana school) | ACEL |
|---|---|---|
| 2012 | (none) * | Abbeville/Harvest Time Christian |
| 2013 | (none) * | West Monroe/Northeast Baptist |
| 2014 | (none) * | West Monroe/Northeast Baptist |
| 2015 | Tallulah Academy | Lafayette/John Paul the Great |
| 2016 | Tallulah Academy | Lafayette/John Paul the Great |
| 2017 | Lake Providence/Briarfield | Grand Coteau/Berchmans |
| 2018 | Tallulah Academy | Grand Coteau/Berchmans |

Note: *—championship game not won by a Louisiana school

| Year | MAIS (if won by a Louisiana school) | ACEL |
|---|---|---|
| 2019 | Class 1A: Lake Providence/Briarfield | Grand Coteau/Berchmans |
| 2020 | Class 1A: Lake Providence/Briarfield | Grand Coteau/Berchmans |
| 2021 | Class 2A: Bastrop/Prairie View | Grand Coteau/Berchmans |
| 2022 | (none) * | Lafayette/John Paul the Great |
| 2023 | (none) * | Lafayette/John Paul the Great |
| 2024 | Class 1A: Lake Providence/Briarfield | Lafayette/John Paul the Great |
| 2025 | Class 1A—Division I: Monroe/River Oaks | Lafayette/John Paul the Great |

Note: *—no championship games won by Louisiana schools

=== Eight-man state championships by school * ** ===
Notes: *—although most ALCAL and MPSA/MAIS championships are not, strictly speaking, "state" championships per se, those titles are included with these totals for comparative purposes; **—most recent school name is used, when available

| Nº | School | Municipality | Parish | Year(s) |
|---|---|---|---|---|
| 6 | John Paul The Great Academy Guardians | Lafayette | Lafayette | 2015, 2016, 2022, 2023, 2024, 2025 |
| 5 | Berchmans Academy Saints | Grand Coteau | St. Landry | 2017, 2018, 2019, 2020, 2021 |
| 4 | Briarfield Academy Rebels | Lake Providence | East Carroll | 2017, 2019, 2020, 2024 |
| 3 | Northeast Baptist Knights | West Monroe | Ouachita | 2008, 2013, 2014 |
| 3 | Tallulah Academy Trojans | Tallulah | Madison | 2015, 2016, 2018 |
| 2 | Harvest Time Christian Academy Lions | Abbeville | Vermilion | 2011, 2012 |
| 2 | Livonia Wildcats | Livonia | Pointe Coupee | 1964, 1965 |
| 1 | Lafayette Christian Academy Knights | Lafayette | Lafayette | 2010 |
| 1 | Prairie View Academy Spartans | Bastrop | Morehouse | 2021 |
| 1 | River Oaks Mustangs | Monroe | Ouachita | 2025 |
| 1 | Tensas Academy Chiefs | St. Joseph | Tensas | 2011 |
| 1 | White Castle Bulldogs | White Castle | Iberville | 1966 |
| 1 | Woodland Bulldogs | Clinton | East Feliciana | 1967 |

=== Eight-man national championships by school ===
Multiple Louisiana schools have won eight-man national championships. Several have won titles from among the various divisions within the National Association of Christian Athletes, and LSD has won two national championships for state deaf schools, the latter of which was coached by Susan Gremillion (Louisiana's second female football coach—the first since Mary McMichael in 1944).

| Nº | School | Municipality | Parish | Year(s) |
|---|---|---|---|---|
| 2 | Cornerstone Academy Cardinals | Baton Rouge | East Baton Rouge | 1985, 1987 |
| 2 | Louisiana School for the Deaf War Eagles | Baton Rouge | East Baton Rouge | 2005, 2016 |
| 2 | Reserve Christian Eagles | Reserve | St. John the Baptist | 1990, 1991 |
| 1 | Ben's Ford Christian Eagles | Bogalusa | Washington | 1987 |
| 1 | Parkview Christian Patriots | Sulphur | Calcasieu | 1990 |

=== Boys' flag football state championships by year ===
| Year | LCSAA |
|---|---|
| 1986 | |
| 1987 | |

| Year | LCSAA Class AA | LCSAA Class A |
|---|---|---|
| 1988 | | New Iberia/Assembly Christian |
| 1989 | Lafayette Christian | Baldwin Christian |

| Year | LCSAA |
|---|---|
| 1990 | |
| 1990 | |
| 1991 | |
| 1992 | Crowley/Northside Christian |
| 1993 | |
| 1994 | |
| 1995 | Crowley/Northside Christian * |
| 1996 | |
| 1997 | |
| 1998 | |
| 1999 | |
| 2000 | Houma Christian |
| 2001 | Crowley/Northside Christian |
| 2002 | |
| 2003 | |
| 2004 | |
| 2005 | |
| 2006 | |

*—championship game determined by overtime

=== Boys' flag football state championships by school * ===
Note: *—most recent school name is used, when available

| Nº | School | Municipality | Parish | Year(s) |
|---|---|---|---|---|
| 3 | Northside Christian Warriors | Crowley | Acadia | 1992, 1995, 2001 |
| 1 | Assembly Christian Lions | New Iberia | Iberia | 1988 |
| 1 | Baldwin Christian Academy Beacons | Baldwin | St. Mary | 1989 |
| 1 | Houma Christian Warriors | Houma | Terrebonne | 2000 |
| 1 | Lafayette Christian Academy Knights | Lafayette | Lafayette | 1989 |

=== Boys' flag football national championships by school ===
| Nº | School | Municipality | Parish | Year |
|---|---|---|---|---|
| 1 | Believer's Life Christian Academy Lions | Harvey | Jefferson | 2003 |
| 1 | Denham Road Christian Falcons | Central | East Baton Rouge | 1982 |
| 1 | Fundamental Baptist Christian Academy | Livingston | Livingston | 1997 |
| 1 | Marrero Christian Academy Knights | Marrero | Jefferson | 1998 |
| 1 | Victory Baptist Academy Falcons | Lake Charles | Calcasieu | 1998 |

=== Girls' flag football state championships by year ===
| Year | New Orleans Saints |
|---|---|
| 2024 | New Orleans/De La Salle |
| 2025 | New Orleans/De La Salle |
| 2026 | New Orleans/De La Salle |

=== Girls' flag football state championships by school * ===
Note: *—most recent school name is used, when available

| Nº | School | Municipality | Parish | Years |
|---|---|---|---|---|
| 3 | De La Salle Lady Cavaliers | New Orleans | Orleans | 2024, 2025, 2026 |

== See also ==
- List of Alabama High School Athletic Association championships
- List of Arkansas state high school football champions
- List of California state high school football champions
- List of Missouri state high school football champions
- List of PIAA football state champions
- West Virginia High School Football State Championships and playoff history
- High School Football National Championship
