= HMHS =

HMHS may refer to:

- Humana Military Healthcare Services, an American military health care provider
- Her or His Majesty's Hospital Ship, a ship prefix; see List of hospitals and hospital ships of the Royal Navy

== Schools ==
- Haddonfield Memorial High School, Camden County, New Jersey, United States
- Hanson Memorial High School, Franklin, Louisiana, United States
- Harvey Milk High School, New York City, United States
- Hercules Middle/High School, Hercules, California, United States
