= Louisiana Interscholastic Athletic and Literary Organization =

Defunct student organization in Louisiana

The Louisiana Interscholastic Athletic and Literary Organization (LIALO) was a segregated student competition league in Louisiana during the 20th-century. It was created as an alternative to the Louisiana High School Athletic Association (LHSAA), which was segregated during that time. At its peak, the LIALO had a membership of 280 schools.

== History ==
=== Founding ===
The LIALO was founded at Peabody High School in Alexandria, Louisiana in 1935 by William H. Gray, a professor at Southern University. Initially created solely for athletic competition, in 1940 it began sponsoring academic competition as well. Academic competitions included speech, woodworking, bookkeeping, mathematics, and music. These competitions went up to the state level, offering a complete alternative to the LHSAA.

=== Fight for desegregation ===
In 1962, the LHSAA removed the "whites only" membership clause from their charter, however, it continued to maintain an unofficial policy of exclusion. St. Augustine High School was one of the first predominantly Black schools to try and switch affiliations to the LHSAA, applying for membership in 1964. In response, the LHSAA voted to only accept new member schools every two years. St. Augustine reapplied in 1965 following a third charter change to require new member schools be subjected to a vote by other member schools. St. Augustine's application was rejected by an 11–185 vote.

In response to its rejection, St. Augustine sued the LHSAA for membership. In their lawsuit, which targeted the LHSAA and the Louisiana Board of Elementary and Secondary Education, they claimed that predominantly Black schools had been "systematically denied membership in the LHSAA" and asked for the courts to order the LHSAA's integration. The case was heard by Frederick J. R. Heebe in 1967. The LIALO argued that LHSAA benefited from public funds and property and thus was required to desegregate. By contrast, the LHSAA claimed that their member schools were allowed to play games against LIALO member schools and that some LIALO schools were desegregated. The case was decided in favor of St. Augustine and upheld on appeal in 1968, with the ruling stating that St. Augustine be immediately admitted and that the LHSAA cease discriminating against predominantly Black schools. The LHSAA's discrimination was plainly upheld, with the decision stating "no other reasonable inference is supported by the record and no other explanation is offered to us."

=== Dissolution and legacy ===
Following the decision, a large number of schools began to leave the LIALO in favor of the LHSAA in 1969. Before the end of the year, its membership had declined from a historic 280 schools to only 109. The 1969–1970 school year was the LIALO's final year of operation.

The LIALO did not have a well-documented structure during its existence and, during its dissolution, many of its records went missing. In 2015, a California schoolteacher who grew up participating in the LIALO began an effort to gather and maintain as many of the LIALO's remaining records as possible.

== Schools ==
- Booker T. Washington High School, Shreveport
- Crepe Myrtle High School, Pineville
- Cypress Grove High School, Lutcher
- George Washington Carver High School, New Orleans
- McKinley High School, Baton Rouge
- Richwood High School, Monroe
- St. Augustine High School, New Orleans

== See also ==
- List of Louisiana state high school football champions
