= Petey Perot =

American football player and coach (born 1957)

No. 62, 71
- Position: Guard

Personal information
- Born: April 28, 1957 (age 69); Natchitoches, Louisiana, U.S.
- Listed height: 6 ft 4 in (1.93 m)
- Listed weight: 285 lb (129 kg)

Career information
- High school: St. Mary's (Natchitoches)
- College: Northwestern State
- NFL draft: 1979: 2nd round, 48th overall pick

Career history

Playing
- Philadelphia Eagles (1979–1984); New Orleans Saints (1985)

Coaching
- Louisiana Tech (1986–1987) Volunteer assistant; Louisiana Tech (1988–1996) Offensive line coach; Southern Miss (1997–1999) Offensive line coach; Louisiana Tech (2000–2012) Offensive line coach; Southern Miss (2013) Offensive line coach

Career NFL statistics
- Games played: 74
- Games started: 38
- Stats at Pro Football Reference

Edward Joseph "Petey" Perot (born April 28, 1957) is an American former professional football player who was an offensive lineman in the National Football League (NFL). He started in Super Bowl XV for the Philadelphia Eagles. Perot played college football for the Northwestern State Demons and was selected in the second round of the 1979 NFL draft by the Eagles. He also played for the New Orleans Saints in 1985.

Following his playing career, Perot coached at Southern Miss and Louisiana Tech.
