= Catholic High School of Pointe Coupee =

Catholic of Pointe Coupee
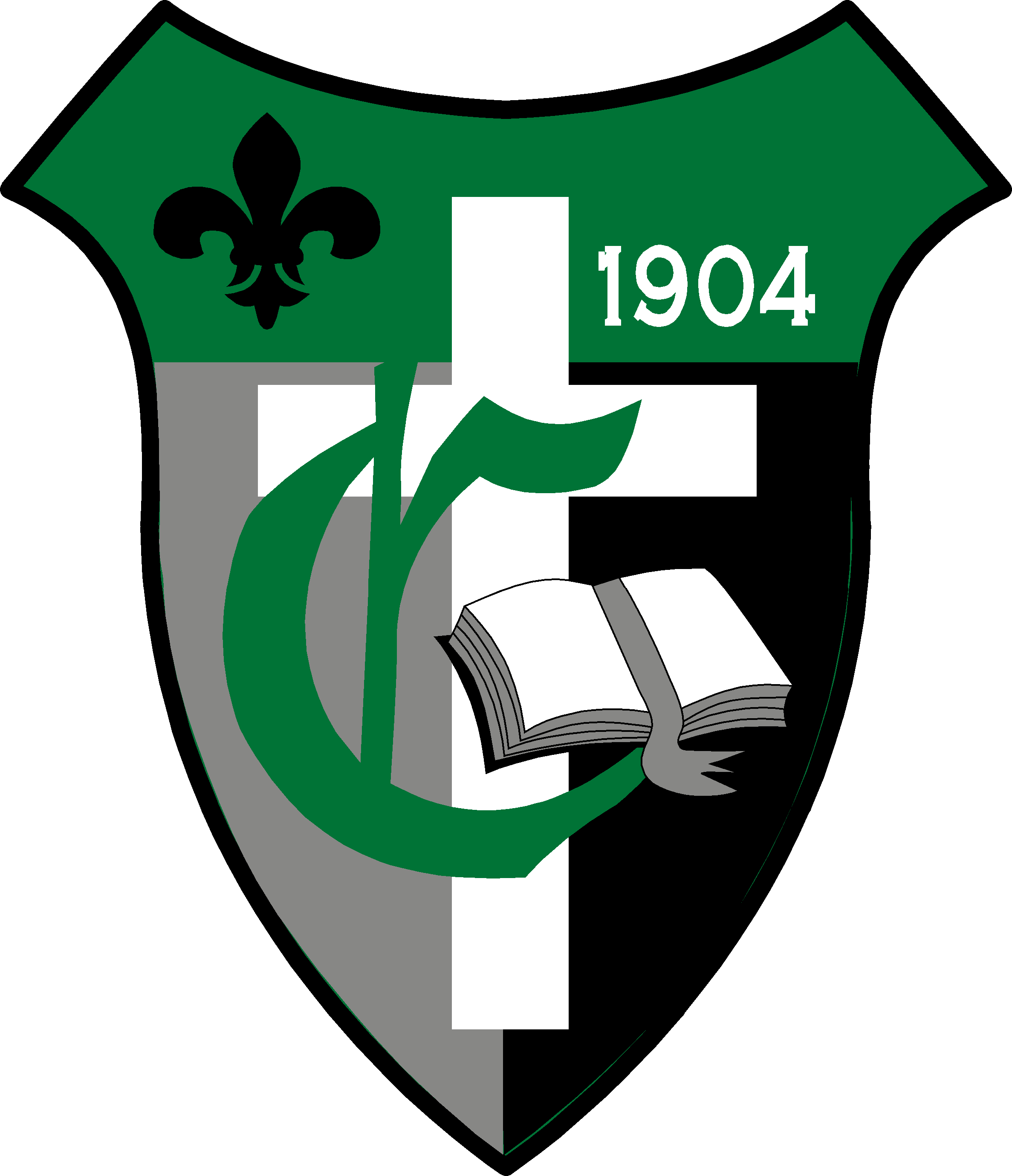

Location
- 504 Fourth Street West, P.O. Box 146; New Roads, Louisiana 70760; United States; 30°41′46″N 91°26′20″W

Information
- Type: Private, Coeducational
- Religious affiliations: Roman Catholic; Sisters of St. Joseph
- Established: 1904
- Principal: Fran Olinde
- Teaching staff: 25.0 (FTE)
- Grades: PK3-12
- Enrollment: 305 (2013-2014)
- Student to teacher ratio: 12.2
- Colors: Green and white
- Nickname: Hornets
- Accreditation: Southern Association of Colleges and Schools
- Website: www.catholicpc.com

Catholic of Pointe Coupee is a Catholic Interparochial school in New Roads, Louisiana. It was founded in 1904 by the Sisters of St. Joseph who were commissioned to bring Catholic education to Pointe Coupee Parish.

== History ==
Catholic of Pointe Coupee has been affiliated with the Sisters of St. Joseph since its conception. The school has been housed in several different buildings over its lifetime, beginning in a small four-room cottage on St. Mary Street, then moving up to a slightly larger building which was destroyed by fire in 1929. Then the school moved into a large wood-framed building donated by the Richey Family. The School/convent remained in that building until the early 1960s when a modern facility was completed on Fourth Street which houses the school to this day.

In 2005 and 2006, the School was host to many students from Hurricane Katrina destroyed Catholic schools in the New Orleans area, including Redeemer Seton High.

== Demographics ==
The demographic breakdown of the 305 students enrolled for the 2013–2014 school year was:

- Asian/Pacific islanders - 0.4%
- Black - 13.1%
- Hispanic - 1.6%
- White - 84.9%

== Athletics ==
Catholic High athletics competes in the LHSAA.

The school competes in 1A and offers a number of sports and after school programs, including football, soccer, power lifting, baseball, softball, basketball, cross-country, track, cheer and dance.

=== Championships ===
Football championships

- (1) State Championship: 1978

Baseball

- (2) State Championships: 1972, 1986

Boys' power lifting

- (5) State Championships: 1988, 1992, 2007, 2008, 2009

Girls' power lifting

- (4) State Championships: 1992, 2005, 2008, 2009

== Notable alumni ==
- Donald J. Cazayoux, Jr. - politician
- Robert M. Marionneaux - politician
