= Ascension Catholic High School =

Location
- 311 St. Vincent Street; Donaldsonville, (Ascension Parish), Louisiana 70346; United States; 30°6′9″N 90°59′9″W

Information
- Type: Private, Coeducational
- Motto: Honor ∙ Truth ∙ Loyalty
- Religious affiliation: Roman Catholic
- Established: 1845; 181 years ago
- Principal: Tammy Crochet
- Chaplain: Fr. Matthew Dupre
- Grades: Pre K - 12th grade
- Language: English
- Hours in school day: 8 am- 3 pm
- Colors: Purple and gold
- Sports: golf, basketball (boys and girls), tennis, football, softball, cross country, track, and volleyball (boys and girls)
- Mascot: Bulldog
- Nickname: Bulldogs
- Rival: St. John and Ascension Christian
- Accreditation: Southern Association of Colleges and Schools
- Yearbook: The Bulldog
- Website: www.acbulldogs.org

Ascension Catholic High School is a private, Roman Catholic high school in Donaldsonville, Louisiana. It is the oldest Catholic school in the Roman Catholic Diocese of Baton Rouge

== History ==
Ascension Catholic was established in 1845 as St. Vincent Institute by the Daughters of Charity.

== Athletics ==
Ascension Catholic athletics competes in the LHSAA.

=== Championships ===
Football championships

- (3) State Championships: 1941, 1973, 1992

== Notable alumni ==
- James Carville - Nationally recognized political consultant and campaign adviser to President Bill Clinton
- Jack P. F. Gremillion - Attorney General of Louisiana
