= Ridgewood Preparatory School =

Private school in Metairie, Louisiana, U.S.

Coordinates: 29°58′34.5″N 90°10′22″W

Location
- 201 Pasadena Ave; Metairie, LA 70001; U.S.

Information
- Type: Private, college preparatory
- Established: 1948; 78 years ago
- Closed: 2023; 3 years ago
- Headmaster: M. J. Montgomery Jr.
- Faculty: 35
- Gender: Coeducational
- Enrollment: 270
- Average class size: 16 students
- Student to teacher ratio: 8:1
- Campus: Suburban, 4 buildings
- Colors: Blue & Gold
- Slogan: Once an Eagle, Always an Eagle
- Athletics conference: LHSAA 1A
- Sports: 8 sports
- Mascot: Golden Eagle

Ridgewood Preparatory School was a university-preparatory private school located in Metairie, an unincorporated community in Jefferson Parish, Louisiana. It included grades PreK-12, with a student-teacher ratio of 10:1. Ridgewood was approved by the State Department of Education and accredited by the Southern Association of Colleges and Schools.

Ridgewood's diverse student body came from six parishes, as well as, from countries around the world. In 2007, fifteen percent of students were foreign citizens coming from nations as far-ranging as Argentina, Nigeria, Norway, Japan, Vietnam, and Egypt. The school was organized as a primary, middle, and high school. The academic year consisted of two semesters, each divided into three six-week grading periods. The school was operated as a non-profit corporation aided by an advisory board.

By June 2021, the student population of Ridgewood is 194 students, with an average grade size of 13 students. In the same year, the annual tuition was reported to be $7,400.

After 75 years, the school closed in January 2023 due to "persistent low enrollment" and financial issues.

== History ==
Ridgewood Preparatory School was founded in 1948 by Ottis O. Stuckey as a college preparatory school for boys in grades kindergarten through twelve. The original address was 201 Northline in Old Metairie. The school became co-educational in 1952. The campus was moved in 1972 to the present address at 201 Pasadena Avenue in Metairie, Louisiana. M.J. Montgomery Jr. was the last headmaster.

=== Hurricane Katrina ===
Although the school did not flood, Ridgewood is part of the Greater New Orleans Metro area, and thus felt some effects of Hurricane Katrina. It was one of the first schools in the New Orleans Metro Area to re-open following the storm, opening on September 26, 2005. The school had more than 600 students before the incident, now it has 210.

== Athletics ==
Ridgewood competed as a member of the Louisiana High School Athletic Association (LHSAA).

Students competed in football, baseball, softball, basketball, track, tennis, volleyball, and soccer. The Ridgewood extracurricular sports program began in middle school, with a soccer program available for children in grades 5-8. Junior varsity participation in volleyball, basketball, softball, and baseball usually beginning at the eighth grade level. Students were not restricted from joining one sport by participation in another sport, other than by seasonal and scheduling constraints. Ridgewood followed the LHSAA guidelines regarding student academic requirements for participation: a student must have a minimum GPA of 1.5 and passing grades in 5 out of 6 subjects.

=== State Championships ===
Baseball

- (1) 1975

Football

- (1) 1964

Girls Basketball

- (7) 1991, 1992, 1993, 1996, 1998, 1999, 2000

Softball

- (3) 1988, 1990, 2004

== Controversies ==
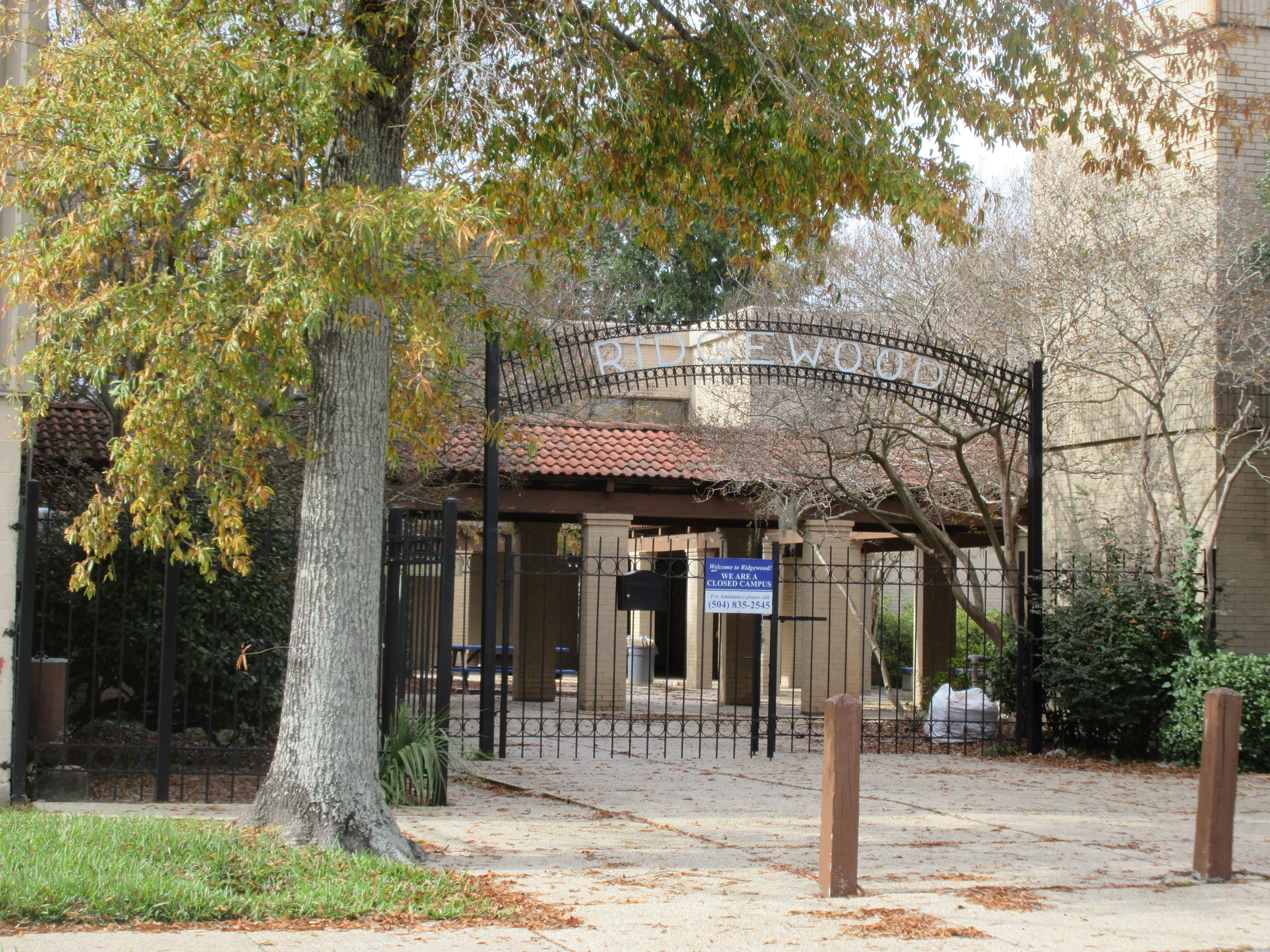
Closed Ridgewood School in January 11, 2023

=== Barring of a student with disabilities ===
On July 30, 2020, The Justice Department reached a settlement agreement with Ridgewood. Ridgewood Preparatory School violated the Americans with Disabilities Act by denying a child with spina bifida admission to its pre-kindergarten and kindergarten class because of his disability.

The school failed to change its policies, practices, and procedures to enable the child to access the school’s programs. The buildings and facilities also fail to cater people with disabilities. The Department of Justice investigated and found that the school, among lots of other things, had inaccessible doors, walkways, and bathrooms. Under the agreement, Ridgewood had to offer the child two years of tuition-free enrollment and, upon enrollment, provide him with reasonable modifications.

=== Unsafe school tires ===
A FOX 8 investigation revealed that three tires on a school bus are almost 15 years old. The bus takes students on field trips and the football team to games. The Tire Safety Group says that schools should remove all front bus tires after six years but under no scenario should a tire be on a bus longer than 10. The headmaster, M.J. Montgomery, Jr, wouldn't speak to FOX 8 on camera. He invited them into his office but said that their entire discussion was off the record. The only thing that they were allowed to say is that he has no comment on the issue.

== Closure ==
Late on January 9, 2023, the school announced it would be closing in 2 days as of the afternoon of 11 January. Out of 145 students, only 114 returned after the holiday break. The nonprofit school can no longer afford to pay its more than two dozen teachers. Additionally, its 89-year-old headmaster's health was deteriorating, and couldn't get a personal loan. Many parents and students were startled by the short notice. To compensate, Ridgewood made tuition and class arrangements for another Metairie school, Ecole Classique.
