= Haynesville Junior/Senior High School =

High school in Louisiana, United States

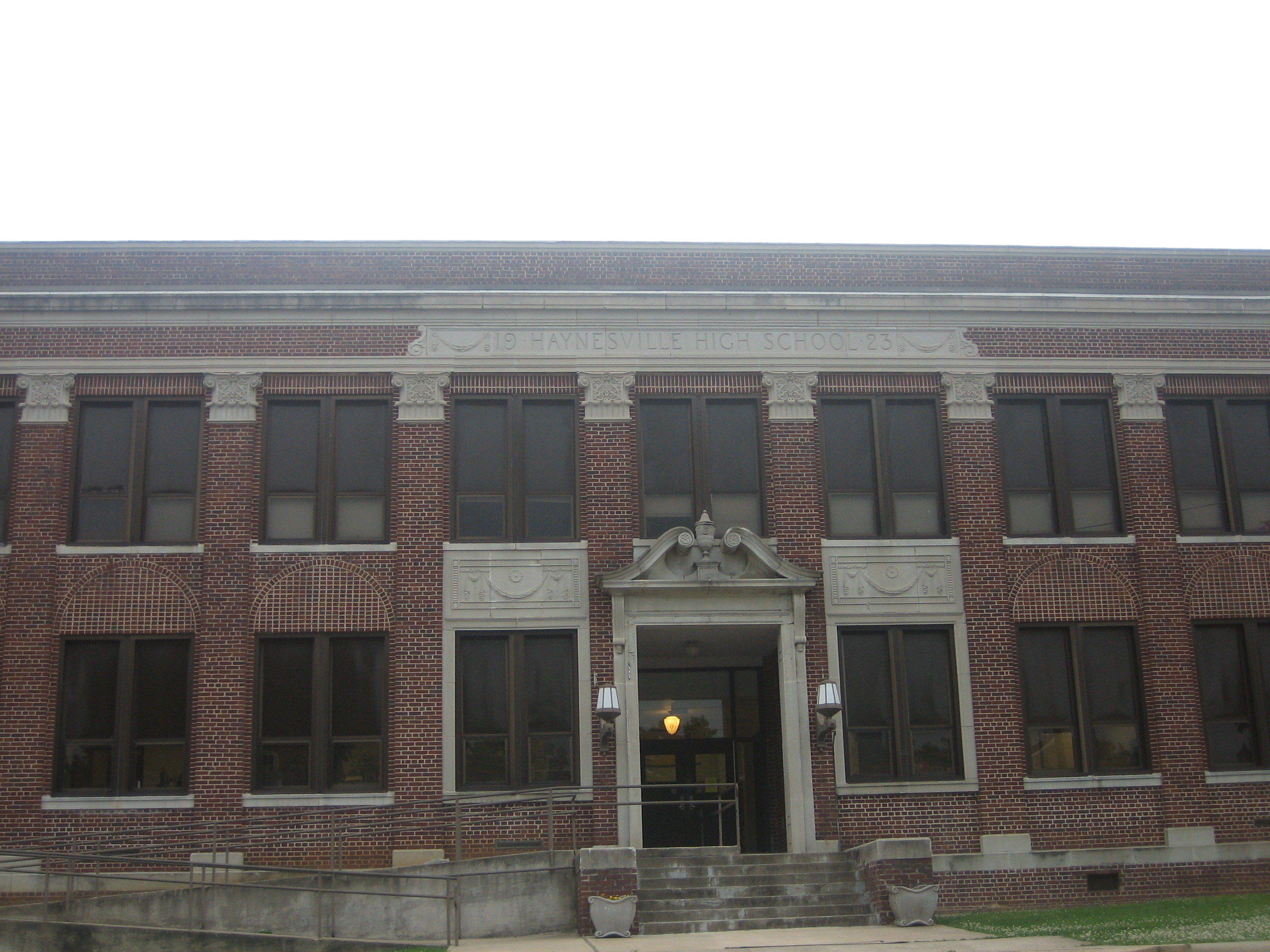
- Haynesville Junior-Senior High School

Location
- 9930 US-79; Haynesville, (Claiborne Parish), Louisiana 71038; United States; 32.9582°N 93.1369°W

Information
- Type: Public
- School district: Claiborne Parish School Board
- Teaching staff: 18.51 (FTE)
- Grades: 5–12
- Enrollment: 251 (2023-2024)
- Student to teacher ratio: 13.56
- Colors: Yellow and black
- Athletics conference: LHSAA District 1-1A
- Mascot: Golden Tornado
- Website: www.claibornepsb.org/our-schools/haynesville-jr-sr-high-school

Haynesville Junior/Senior High School is a public junior and senior high school in Haynesville, Louisiana, United States, and a part of the Claiborne Parish School Board.

== Athletics ==
Haynesville Senior High athletics competes in the LHSAA.

- Baseball
- Basketball
- Cross Country
- Football
- Powerli
- Softball
- Track and Field
- Cheer
- Dance line

=== Championships ===
Football championships

- (17) State Championships: 1924, 1929, 1936, 1970, 1971, 1984, 1987, 1990, 1991, 1993, 1994, 1995, 1996, 2000, 2009, 2013, 2014

Coaches

- Joe Aillet - Won three state championships during his tenure as head football coach from 1927 to 1935.
- Red Franklin - LHSAA Hall of Fame Head Coach, Alton "Red" Franklin, won eleven state championships (1970, 1971, 1984, 1987, 1990, 1991, 1993, 1994, 1995, 1996, 2000) and were state runners-up four times in thirty-five seasons. He finished with a record of 366–76–8 and a .822 winning percentage with eight perfect seasons at Haynesville. Franklin was also an assistant coach at Marksville High School and head coach at Springhill High School. During his playing career, Franklin played football for the University of Alabama and at Louisiana College.

== Notable alumni ==
- Cam Jackson, NFL defensive tackle
