= Kentwood High Magnet School =

High school in Louisiana, United States

Location
- 603 Ninth Street; Kentwood, (Tangipahoa Parish), Louisiana 70444; United States; 30.9374°N 90.5149°W

Information
- Type: Public high school
- School district: Tangipahoa Parish School Board
- Principal: Sharess Baptiste
- Staff: 24.75 (FTE)
- Enrollment: 313 (2023-2024)
- Student to teacher ratio: 12.65
- Colors: Blue, orange and white
- Mascot: Kangaroo
- Nickname: Kangaroos

Kentwood High Magnet School is a senior high school in Kentwood, Louisiana, United States. It is a part of the Tangipahoa Parish School Board.

== History ==
In 1889, the first school building in Kentwood opened. In 1896 the Kentwood Collegiate Institution was established, and its first graduating class was in 1906. After Kentwood Collegiate opened it gained a two-story building adjacent to the original one. The Southern Association of Colleges and Schools accredited the school in 1923. A high school building opened in 1931 was destroyed by a fire in 1938, and replaced by the current high school building in 1940.

A gymnasium was opened in 1942, and a stadium was added in 1950. Kentwood High consolidated with W. Dillon High School in 1969, adding grades 1 though 3 and 9 through 12. In 1971, elementary grades were removed, leaving only grades 7 through 12. The current high school building was renovated in 1979 and the American football building was renovated in 1984. In 1995, a vocational building opened. In 2011, the school was renamed after becoming a magnet fine and performing arts school.

== Athletics ==
Kentwood High athletics competes in the LHSAA.

=== Championships ===
Football championships

- (9) State Championships: 1928, 1939, 1969, 1983, 1986, 1997, 1998, 2015, 2018
