= Vermilion Catholic High School =

Private, coeducational school in Abbeville, Louisiana, United States

Location
- 425 Park Avenue; Abbeville, (Vermilion Parish), Louisiana 70510; United States
- Coordinates: 29°58′53″N 92°8′25″W

Information
- Type: Private, Coeducational
- Motto: Enter to Learn Christ. Leave to serve Christ.
- Religious affiliation: Roman Catholic
- CEEB code: 190-020
- Principal: Dr. Stella Arabie
- Grades: K–12
- Enrollment: 241 (2017)
- Colors: Maroon, Grey and White
- Team name: Screaming Eagles
- Accreditation: Southern Association of Colleges and Schools
- Yearbook: Eagle
- Tuition: 6520
- Athletic Director: Kim Guidry
- Website: www.vermilioncatholic.com

Vermilion Catholic High School is a private, Roman Catholic high school in Abbeville, Louisiana. It is located in the Roman Catholic Diocese of Lafayette.

== Athletics ==
Vermilion Catholic athletics competes in the LHSAA.

=== Championships ===
Football championships

- (3) State Championships: 2003, 2013, 2024

== Notable alumni ==
- Bob Hensgens, Louisiana state representative
