= Charles B. Roussève =

Charles B. Roussève (1902–1993) was a teacher, principal, historian, musician, poet, and writer in New Orleans, Louisiana. The Amistad Research Center has a collection of his papers.

== Early years ==
He was the oldest of eight children born to Barthelemy and Valentine Mansion Rousseve. Lucien Mansion, a "militant civic worker" and writer during the Civil War and Reconstruction era was his great-grandfather. Dominique Foster who served under general Andrew Jackson at the Battle of New Orleans in 1815 was his great-great-grandfather.

He graduated valedictorian from Xavier Preparatory School, received an undergraduate degree Straight College, a master's degree in history from Xavier University, and did graduate studies at the University of Chicago. He received an honorary PhD from Xavier University.

== Personal life ==
He married Valerie Theresa Bowie of New Orleans February 2, 1924. She died January 3, 1929. He married teacher and librarian Mildred Celeste Robichaux January 31, 1931 and they had five children together: Charles S. Rousseve, Theresa R. Glass, twins Roland and Ronald Rousseve, and Yolande R. Eugere.

He was Catholic, and also a member of the Knights of Peter Claver.

== Career ==
Rousseve worked in the New Orleans Public Schools for 45 years, twenty-one of them as a teacher. He was principal of Julius Rosenwald and Johnson Lockett elementary schools, Samuel J. Green and Carter G. Woodson Junior High Schools, and Booker T. Washington Senior High School. He retired from Booker T. High School in 1966. During summers and evenings he taught French, English, and education at Straight, Xavier, and Southern.

For his research on African Americans in Louisiana, he wrote to Horace Mann Bond in 1934.

He was a musician, poet, and translator. He was published in The Louisiana Weekly, Columbia Magazine, and in poetry anthologies. His book The Negro in Louisiana: Aspects of His History and His Literature published in 1937 was the first book-length work published by the Xavier University Press. It was a pioneering work, the first book about black history in the state.

He belonged to the NAACP, New Orleans Urban League, Knights of Peter Clavier, Alpha Phi Alpha fraternity, Friends of the Amistad Research Center, B-Sharp Music Club, Orleans Principals Association, High School Principals Association, Louisiana Education Association, and National Education Association. He served on the board of directors of the Amistad Research Center.

== Work ==
- The Negro in Louisiana: Aspects of His History and His Literature (1937)
