= St. Mary's Catholic School (Natchitoches, Louisiana) =

St. Mary's School

Location
- 1101 East 5th Street; Natchitoches, Louisiana; United States; 31°46′9″N 93°4′38″W

Information
- Type: Private, Coeducational
- Religious affiliation: Roman Catholic
- Patron saint: St. Mary
- Established: 1888
- Authority: Diocese of Alexandria
- Principal: Jason Lachica
- Grades: PK–12
- Colors: Royal Blue and White
- Song: The Bells of St. Mary's
- Athletics conference: District 3-1A
- Sports: Football, Basketball, Baseball/Softball, Golf, Tennis, Track and Field
- Mascot: Max the Tiger
- Nickname: Tigers
- Rivals: Lakeview, LaSalle, Logansport, Montgomery, Northwood-Lena
- Yearbook: Au Revoir
- Tuition: $4,515
- Website: www.smstigers.org

St. Mary's Catholic School is a private coeducational Roman Catholic PK-12 school in Natchitoches, Louisiana, United States, located in the Diocese of Alexandria.

== Extracurricular activities ==
Extracurricular activities include quiz bowl, 4-H, drama club, FCA, FBLA, BETA, and student council. Student organizations perform community service, attend conferences and conventions, sponsor activities on campus, and participate in fundraising.

== Athletics ==
St. Mary's athletics competes in the LHSAA. St. Mary's mascot is the tiger, and its school colors are blue and white.

Sports sponsored by the school include: football, girls' and boys' basketball, baseball, softball, track and field, cross country, tennis, golf, danceline, baton twirling, and cheerleading.

=== Championships ===
Football Championships

- (2) State Championships: 1977, 2015

Baseball Championships

- (2) State Championships: 2011, 1965

Gril's Basketball Championship

- (1) State Championship: 2020

== Notable alumni ==
- Petey Perot - NFL player
- Eugene P. Watson - Former head librarian and professor of library science at Northwestern State University
