= Bowling Green School =

Location
- Franklinton; 30°50′19″N 90°9′25″W

Information
- Type: Non-sectarian college prep
- Established: 1969
- Principal: Kim Burris
- Grades: PreK - 12
- Enrollment: 900
- Colors: Green, Gold and White
- Team name: Campers
- Website: www.bgsbucs.com

Bowling Green School is a Pre-K through 12th Grade, college prep, segregation academy located in Franklinton, Louisiana, United States, in Washington parish.

The school colors are green, gold and white. The school mascot is the Buccaneer.

== History ==
The school was founded in 1969 as a segregation academy by white parents seeking to avoid racially integrated public schools. In 1975, a federal court ordered the state of Louisiana to stop providing textbooks and school bus service to Bowling Green school. The court ruled that substantial state assistance to the racially segregated Bowling Green School violated of the equal protection clause of the Fourteenth Amendment

In 1999, Bowling Green enrolled its first black student. The same year, the school applied to state of Louisiana Department of Education to be certified as no longer racially discriminatory thus make its graduates eligible for the TOPS scholarship program. After the federal Justice Department directed the state not to certify the school as nondiscriminatory, Bowling Green School filed suit in federal court. The district court found that Bowling Green had not demonstrated a good faith commitment to eliminating the vestiges of past discrimination and has not made meaningful progress toward becoming a nondiscriminatory school. In 2004, the ruling was upheld by the 5th Circuit Court of Appeals

== Athletics ==
=== Championships ===
Football championships

- (2) Championships: 1983, 1997
