= Briarfield Academy =

Location
- Lake Providence, Louisiana; 32.8309868°N 91.1882044°W

Information
- Type: Private
- Established: 1970
- Grades: PK-12
- Colors: Blue, Red and Grey
- Team name: Rebels
- Website: briarfieldacademy.com

Briarfield Academy is a non-sectarian, private school admitting pre-Kindergarten through twelfth grade students. It is located on Riddle Lane in Lake Providence in East Carroll Parish in northeastern Louisiana, United States. The school has more than 180 students.

== History ==
The school was founded as a segregation academy in 1970 after a federal court ordered the racial integration of East Carroll Parish public schools. This was 16 years after the US Supreme Court had ruled that segregated public schools were unconstitutional, in Brown v. Board of Education (1954).

When it first opened, the school enrolled 400 students in kindergarten through 8th grade. By the end of 1970, Briarfield Academy enrolled 565 students at two campuses. Many of the Briarfield Academy's teachers in the early years were former employees of the public schools system. They resigned and took pay cuts to avoid having to teach in racially integrated classrooms.

== Athletics ==
Briarfield Academy is known for its success in athletics

8-Man Football

- 3 State Championships in 4 years in football while being Runner-Up in 2022 under Coach Beau Travis's tenure.

Girls' Basketball

- Coach Cherie Morara has coached two state championship teams in 2020 and 2022.

Boys' Basketball

- Coach Blake Ratcliff led the boys to their first Championship win in 49 years in 2024.

Fast Pitch Softball

- Briarfield's Softball has won state championships under Head Coach, Thad Travis, with assistant coaches Matt Harper and Paige Harper in 2018 and 2019, and again under Head Coach, Matt Harper with assistant coach Paige Harper and Lindsey Hodgkins in 2022 and 2023 and again in 2024 under Head coach Matt Harper with assistant coaches Paige Harper, Chris Forman, Bonnie Travis, and Thad Travis.

=== Championships ===
Football championships

- (3) LISA Football: 1979, 1989, 1991
- (3) MAIS Football: 2017, 2019, 2020, 2021 Runner-Up, 2024

Basketball championships

- (2) Girls Basketball: 2020, 2022
- (1) Boys' Basketball: 2024

Softball championships

- (5) MAIS Softball: 2018, 2019, 2022, 2023, 2024
