= Hanson Memorial High School =

Location
- 903 Anderson Street; South Louisiana; Franklin, (St. Mary Parish), Louisiana 70538; United States; 29°47′41″N 91°30′28″W

Information
- Type: Private, Coeducational
- Religious affiliation: Roman Catholic
- Established: 1925
- Founder: Minnie Hanson Conolly
- School district: St.Mary Parish
- Authority: Diocese of Lafayette
- Dean: Tommy Schexnayder
- Principal: Connie Daigle
- Grades: 6–12
- Colors: Royal Blue and Gold
- Fight song: HMS Fight Song
- Mascot: Fighting Tiger
- Nickname: Tigers
- Accreditation: Southern Association of Colleges and Schools
- Website: www.hansonmemorial.com

Hanson Memorial High School is a private, Roman Catholic high school in Franklin, Louisiana. It is located in the Roman Catholic Diocese of Lafayette.

== History ==
Hanson Memorial High School began opening its doors to the youth of Franklin since 1925. Mrs. Minnie Hanson Conolly presented the main school as well as the acreage in memory of her father, Albert Hanson, and her brother, Eddie Hanson. In 1931, Mrs. Conolly established an endowment fund dedicated to facility upkeep. The addition of a library and cafeteria building in the early fifties and the construction of a gym/science structure in 1962 completed the facilities for the school. The late Mrs. J. C. Blevins continued the work begun by her aunt. In the spring of 1967, the Christian Brothers, after forty years of work in the education of boys in Franklin, withdrew from the faculty at Hanson because of a greater need in other areas of the Province. In August 1967, St. John Academy and Hanson Memorial High School were consolidated and Hanson opened as a junior and senior coeducational high school. The Marianites of Holy Cross, who had been at St. John since 1871, agreed to become a part of Hanson's staff. Currently, Hanson Memorial High School educates students in grades six through twelve. In 1999 a Capital Campaign raised nearly one million dollars. That money was used to build a modern eight room "junior high wing" to the school. In the fall of 2011 a new library was completed, dedicated to Fr. Oniell Landry. Today, Hanson Memorial is run by laymen and women of Franklin and surrounding areas.

== Athletics ==
Hanson Memorial High athletics competes in the LHSAA.

HMS offers nine sports for student-athletes to participate in.

=== Championships ===
Football championships

- (1) State Championship: 1976

Girls' basketball championships

- (1) State Championship: 1978

Championship history
HMS Athletics has tallied a total 12 team state championships in the sports of football, softball, girls' basketball, cross country and golf. Several HMS athletes have been crowned individual state champions in the sports of golf, track and field, and power-lifting.

=== Coaches ===
==== Football ====
- Richard McCloskey - LHSAA Hall of Fame Head Coach, Richard "Dick" McCloskey, won a state championship in 1976. He finished with a record of 286–141–6 and a .667 winning percentage in 39 seasons.

==== Girls' basketball ====
Girls Basketball has enjoyed long time success, especially under the direction of alumnus, Billie Jean Talbot.
