= Louisiana's 32nd House of Representatives district =

American legislative district

Louisiana's 32nd State House of Representatives district
Representative
R. Dewith Carrier; R–Oakdale

Louisiana's 32nd House of Representatives district is one of 105 Louisiana House of Representatives districts. It is currently represented by Republican R. Dewith Carrier of Oakdale.

== Geography ==
HD32 includes the communities of DeQuincy, Elizabeth, Oberlin, Reeves and Starks.

== Election results ==
Year	Winning candidate	Party	Percent	Opponent	Party	Percent	Opponent	Party	Percent
2011	Dorothy Hill	Democratic	78.3%	John Arthur Williams	Independent	21.7%			
2015	Dorothy Hill	Democratic	55.2%	Llewellyn Smith	Republican	44.8%			
2019	R. Dewith Carrier	Republican	64.3%	Herman Ray Hill	Democratic	26.8%	Kristian Poncho	Democratic	8.9%
2023	R. Dewith Carrier	Republican	Cancelled						
