= Kinder High School =

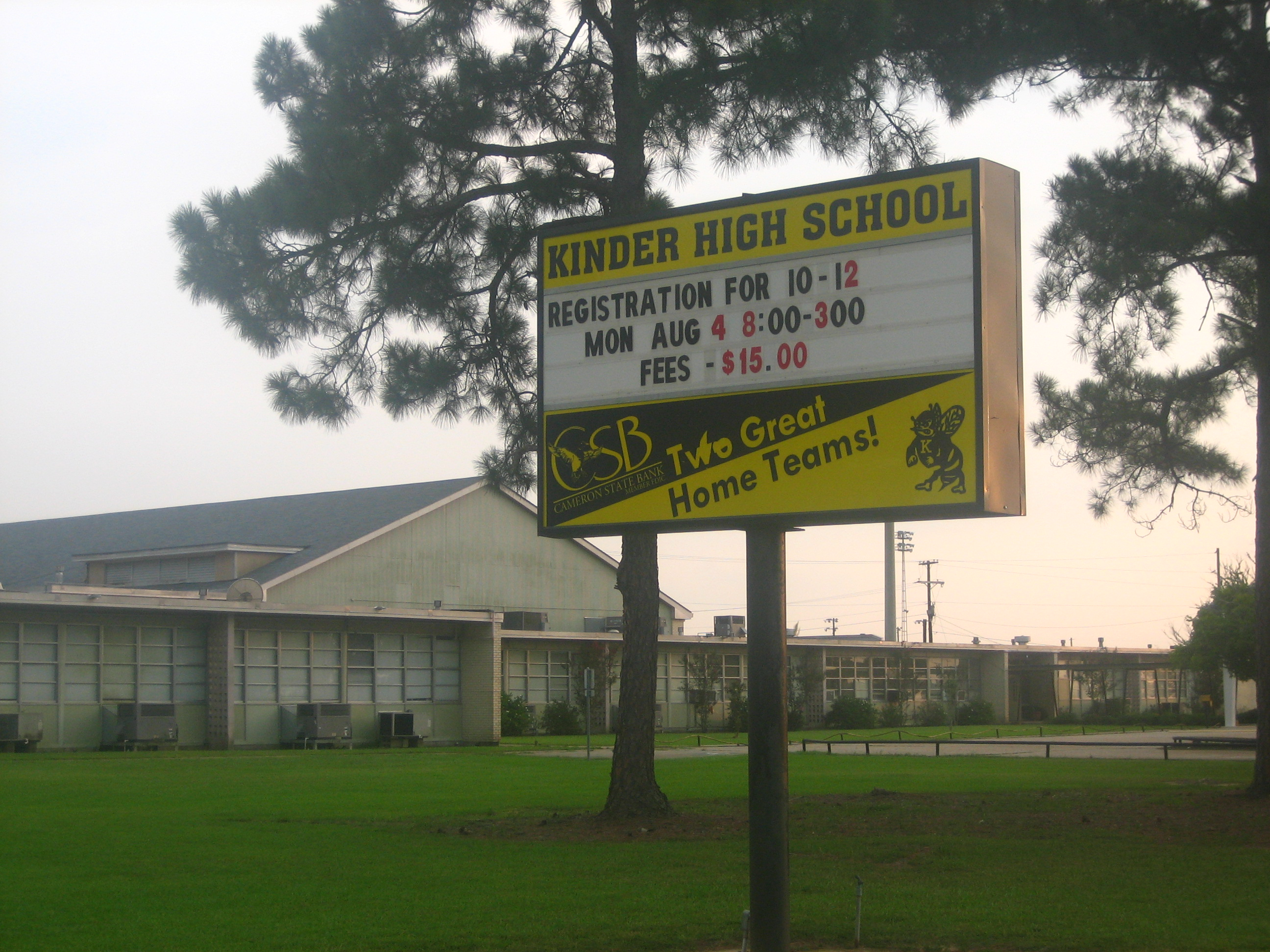

Location
- 145 Highway 383; Kinder, (Allen Parish), Louisiana 70648; United States; 30.4817°N 92.8616°W

Information
- Type: Public high school
- Established: 1913
- School district: Allen Parish School Board
- Principal: Billie Bruchhaus
- Staff: 27.50 (FTE)
- Enrollment: 408 (2023-24)
- Student to teacher ratio: 14.84
- Colors: Black and gold
- Athletics conference: District 3-3A
- Mascot: Yellow Jackets
- Yearbook: Yellow Jacket

Kinder High School is a senior high school (grades 9–12) in Kinder, Louisiana. It is a part of Allen Parish Public Schools.

== History ==
The first school for white children in the area was established in the Green Oak community, located north of modern-day Kinder and just west of what would become the Coushatta Casino Resort. The one-room school was established around 1890 with a Professor Philbrick as its first schoolmaster.

Kinder's first purpose-built schoolhouse was constructed in 1893 and the school graduated its first senior class in 1914.

Education for Black students in Kinder began with the efforts of Mr. Julian Captain, a native of St. Landry Parish who moved to the Hickory Flats area of then Imperial Calcasieu Parish after the Civil War. In 1878, Captain established the first school for local Black students in his home 4 miles north of Kinder and hiring Lawrence Shaw of Oklahoma as the school's teacher. In 1900, Captain deeded 2 acres of his own land to build a church house which also doubled as the school for Black students and one of his own daughters became the school's teacher.

A "training school" for Black students had been established in the 1920s by the Allen Parish School Board and named the Morehead School. Solomon Cole, who had attended the Tuskegee Institute and Southern University was named principal. The Morehead School closed in 1938.

In 1945, a training school for Black elementary school students was opened in Kinder while students in grades 5-12 were bused to the segregated schools at Pecan Grove and Oberlin.

In 1949, Kinder's first segregated Black high school was opened and named after George Washington Carver and saw its first graduating class in 1951.

In 1965, in response to federal judiciary orders to speed along the integration of public schools across Louisiana, the Allen Parish School Board voted to adopt the federal plan for school integration, allowing a window of time in which students could transfer schools if they so desired. However, Carver High School would not permanently close until after the 1968–69 school year.

Kinder's high school played a key role in the United States military's preparedness for combat in the run-up to World War II. The United States Army held in August and September 1941 a series of exercises called the Louisiana Maneuvers, designed to evaluate U.S. training, logistics, doctrine, and commanders. Some 400,000 troops and their commanders were sent to northern and west-central Louisiana to participate, including some of the most senior officers in the Army like Omar Bradley, George S. Patton, and Dwight D. Eisenhower. Eisenhower, then a colonel acting as Chief of Staff to Lieutenant General Walter Krueger, was headquartered with the rest of Kreuger's staff in the Kinder High School building while Kreuger himself took the school's home economics cottage as his office. A historical marker commemorating this period of history was erected at the town's American Legion hall.

== Athletics ==
The Kinder High Yellow Jackets compete in District 3-3A of the LHSAA.

Kinder's football stadium is named after longtime head coach Johnny Buck (1930–2005), one of the all-time winningest head coaches in Louisiana high school football history. Buck won 271 games in his 36-year career between Kinder and Opelousas Catholic and was named Louisiana Sports Writers Association Coach of the Year twice (1967, 1978).

=== State Championships ===
Baseball

- (3) 2014, 2015, 2019

Football

- (4) 1967, 1978, 2013, 2015

== Notable alumni ==
- Blake Trahan (2011), former MLB shortstop for the Cincinnati Reds
