= Preston Frank =

- Born: 1947 (age 78–79); Oberlin, Louisiana, U.S.
- Origin: Soileau, Louisiana, U.S.
- Genres: Zydeco
- Labels: Arhoolie, Lanor, Soulwood
- Formerly of: The Preston Frank Soileau Band

Preston Frank (born 1947) is an American zydeco musician.

Frank was born in Oberlin, Louisiana, of Louisiana Creole ancestry, and grew up in Soileau, Louisiana. Frank's great-grandfather, Joseph Frank Jr., played accordion, and his great-great-grandfather, Joseph Frank Sr., played fiddle, sometimes with fiddler Dennis McGee. Though both Joseph Sr. and Joseph Jr. were known musicians in the area, neither ever recorded. His father, Paul Frank, worked with and played guitar with fiddler Canray Fontenot. Paul Frank was from Duralde, Louisiana prior to settling the family in Soileau. Paul's wife, Preston's mother, was named Rose Frank (née Victoria).

As a child, Frank's family all made a living farming cotton. His father also played house dances. Frank attended Oberlin High School in Oberlin, Louisiana.

Frank began listening to live music at the insistence of his father and his uncle Carlton Frank, who was a fiddler. Once Preston Frank became interested in music, he purchased a Hohner diatonic accordion from a drugstore in Kinder, Louisiana. He learned by listening to records and with some assistance from his father.

== Music career ==
In 1977, Frank assembled The Preston Frank Soileau Band, which included Preston Frank (accordion), his uncles Carlton (fiddle) and Hampton (guitar) Frank, and brothers Charles (guitar) and "Slim" (bass) Prudhomme. The Prudhommes would go on to play in John Delafose's band.

Frank made his first recordings at Savoy Music Center with Arhoolie producer Chris Strachwitz. In 1981, Frank released two singles with Arhoolie, "Shake What You Got" / "Why You Want to Make Me Cry" and "Swallow Special" / "Hey My Little Woman." "Swallow" in both the band name and song title was a homophonous misspelling of Frank's hometown, Soileau. Arhoolie also released Zydeco Vol. 2 in 1985, an LP whose A side consisted of 1981 recordings of Frank's group.

In 1982, Frank and the family band recorded an album with producer Lee Lavergne of Lanor Records. The Preston Frank Family Band released several more albums until 1991's Let's Dance.

Preston Frank has played at festivals including the New Orleans Jazz & Heritage Festival, Festival International, Blackpot Festival, Festivals Acadiens et Créoles, Finger Lakes GrassRoots Festival of Music and Dance, the Southwest Louisiana Zydeco Music Festival, and the Atlanta Harvest Festival.

Frank cultivated an early interest in music in his son, Keith Frank, who would go on to lead the family band at accordion. In an interview, Frank said, "I started Keith young, him. He played my style at first, then he changed to Boozoo’s style, then he went to another style, then he went to his own style. But there’s still some of me in there."

Frank worked in a plywood plant for a living. Shiftwork limited his involvement, and Keith subsequently took over leadership of the band. Preston Frank has still made public appearances with the band, however, playing for example at the Acadiana Center for the Arts in 2023.

In 2023, Preston Frank & the Frank Family Band released Seventy-Five, an album to celebrate Frank's 75th birthday. A reviewer referred to Frank as "one of the last living links to traditional Creole music."

== Discography ==
Shake What You Got / Why Do You Want to Make Me Cry (Preston Frank and the Swallow Playboys)

- Released: 1981
- Format: 45rpm
- Label: Arhoolie Records 545

Swallow Special / Hey My Little Woman (Preston Frank and the Swallow Playboys)

- Released: 1981
- Format: 45rpm
- Label: Arhoolie Records 546

Zydeco Vol. 2 (Preston Frank's Soileau Band, A side)

- Released: 1985
- Format: LP
- Label: Arhoolie Records 1090
- Tracks: "Shake What You Got", "Bals de Lake Charles", "Mon Chere 'Tite Monde", "'Tanta Na-Na", "Ton Aller Là Bas", "Font Kilo", "Why Do You Want to Make Me Cry"

Went To A Dance Last Night / Zydeco Party (Preston Frank and his Zydeco Family)

- Released: 1991
- Format: 45rpm
- Label: Lanor Records 637

Let's Dance (Preston Frank and his Zydeco Family Band)

- Released: 1991
- Format: LP, cassette
- Label: Lanor Records
- Tracks: "Let's Dance", "Why You Wanna Leave Me", "Big Butt Woman", "I'm Glad To Be A Zydeco Man", "Get On The Band Wagon", "Going To The Zydeco", "Why You Wanna Make Me Cry", "Somebody Stole My Rabbit", "Frank Family Band", "Money's Hard To Come By", "Went To A Dance Last Night", "Zydeco Party"

Seventy-Five (Preston Frank & the Frank Family Band)

- Released: 2023
- Format: CD
- Label: Soulwood
- Tracks: "Choupique Two Step," "Why You Wanna Make Me Cry," "Midland Two Step," "Born in the Country," "Gone to Lafayette," "You Used to Call Me," "Heartbreak Eyes," "You Act Sick," "You Don't Like the Way I Dress," "The Mule," "Shake What You Got," "Green Grass"
