= Whiskey Chitto Creek =

Creek in Allen, Beauregard, and Vernon parishes, Louisiana, United States

Whiskey Chitto Creek, or Ouiska Chitto Creek, also known officially as Whisky Chitto Creek is an 86.4-mile-long (139.0 km) spring-fed creek located in Allen, Beauregard, and Vernon parishes, Louisiana, in the United States. It is a tributary to the Calcasieu River and begins at present-day Fort Polk (Vernon Parish), flows near Sugartown (Beauregard Parish), near Grant (Allen Parish), down to Mittie and near Leblanc (east of Reeves).

== Description ==
Whiskey Chitto Creek is part of the Calcasieu River Basin. The creek is surrounded by a mixed pine-hardwood mid-growth forest and passes through low hills. Common wildlife around this creek are livestock, turkeys, deer, and raccoons. It contains largemouth bass, spotted bass, bream, catfish, turtles, and many other species.

The northern section in Vernon Parish passes through the Kisatchie National Forest, and is a landmark and common vacation spot for many locals in the region. It is overseen by the Vernon Unit of the Calcasieu Ranger District. Kisatchie National Forest has much appeal for its wilderness-like qualities. The stream is a designated "scenic waterway" by the Louisiana Scenic Rivers Act of 1970, administered by Louisiana Wildlife and Fisheries. The U.S. Army Corps of Engineers declared it to be a 'navigable stream of the United States' in 2008.

The stream near Mittie, Louisiana, is the site of where a federal agent found evidence of illegal cutting and floating of logs off federal lands that began the Calcasieu Log War of 1877-1879 <article published by Dr. Tom Watson, Dept. of History, McNeese State University, Lether Frazar Library Archives>. Federal agents shut down logging operations on streams in Imperial Calcasieu Parish for some time until issues were resolved. Until World War I, many logs were floated down the stream to Lake Charles mills. The Mittie area section of the stream is also the location of two historic bridge crossings. The La 26 bridge near Mittie is the modern wide concrete replacement of the old narrow wooden structure built in 1929 and destroyed by fire. The concrete bridge replacement, built in the early 1970s, was purposedly built to be 777 feet in length, and can be considered the "Lucky Bridge." This crossing is also the site of a public boat launch and put-in point for watercraft utilizing the stream. Downstream is Carpenter's Bridge, a takeout point for canoes, kayaks, and other small fishing boats and an important access site for traditional camping, swimming, and fishing. The Carpenter family settled this area in the early 1870s. Many wooden bridges existed since the late 1800s, making this crossing one of the oldest still in existence along the entire stream. In 2024, a modern wide concrete structure replaced the deteriorating wooden bridge. The Allen Parish Police Jury owns a two-acre property on the northeast corner of the bridge, and is seeking funding to further develop this property for public use (development of a public boat launch) and enhanced emergency services and law enforcement access to protect recreational users along this section of the stream, one of the most well-known segments of Louisiana's Scenic Rivers.

Based on census records and earliest cemeteries near the stream, the lower section of this stream (from near Mittie to near Leblanc) was permanently settled during the 1850s and 1860s. Early cemeteries established in the 1850s and 1860s along the lower part of stream are named after or connected to these families: Leblanc, Cole, Simmons, and Young (LeJeune) The central section near Sugartown was settled in the 1820s and is the oldest settlement area in what is now Beauregard Parish. Sugartown was an important settlement in early Imperial Calcasieu Parish (1840-1912). The sandy soil along the stream is famous for growing "Sugartown Watermelons." The section near Mittie is famous for canoeing and fishing.

Ernest S. Clements (1898-1987), famous local politician, who served as a Senator in the Louisiana Legislature, as Secretary of Louisiana Wildlife and Fisheries, and as Louisiana Public Service Commissioner, had a camp along the stream near Mittie and enjoyed his time on the stream and interacting with those who enjoyed this natural resource. The United Methodist Church (Louisiana Conference) operates the UskiChitto Retreat Center (URC) along the stream north of Leblanc, Louisiana. The natural beauty of the stream corridor is an important aspect of the facility's 120 acres. Visitors to URC can imagine a time when this area was a virtual wilderness and visualize the large log rafts floated down the stream between the 1870s and World War I.

Ouiska Chitto, meaning "Big Cane Creek," is a transliteration of the name given to the creek by the Choctaw people (Chahta), the original settlers in this area. The Choctaw words were uski for cane and chito for large. French-speaking and Anglo-American settlers adopted this derivation. It was eventually called "Whiskey Chitto Creek." The Choctaws were displaced from Mississippi in the early 1800s by settlers and found the stream to be very suitable as it was similar to colder and fast-running streams they lived along in Mississippi and in a wilderness area. In the 1830s, a Choctaw village was located south of Sugartown along Indian Branch which empties into Whiskey Chitto. The Choctaw are often referred to as "River People." They may have also found the stream to be attractive as a source of cane for making baskets. Even today, many of the descendants of early settlers see themselves as "River People" who have a deep connection with the stream for fishing and recreational activities, an important part of their cultural heritage. Some have even heard family stories that they have some Choctaw in their DNA.

The United States Board on Geographic Names, the official arbiter of geographic names in the United States, decided in 1963 that the official name for the creek is spelled Whisky Chitto Creek.
