= Camp Johnson =

Camp Johnson could refer to any of U.S. military facilities:

- Camp Leroy Johnson in New Orleans, Louisiana, a facility which is now part of the University of New Orleans
- Camp Gilbert H. Johnson, one of the satellite facilities that comprises Camp Lejeune in North Carolina; it was originally known as Montford Point
- Camp Johnson (Vermont) in Colchester, Vermont
