= Leroy Johnson (Medal of Honor) =

United States Army Medal of Honor recipient

- Born: December 6, 1919; Caney Creek, Allen Parish, Louisiana
- Died: December 15, 1944 (aged 25); Limon, Leyte, the Philippines
- Burial place: Manila American Cemetery, Philippines
- Military career
- Allegiance: United States of America
- Branch: United States Army
- Service years: 1943–1944
- Rank: Sergeant
- Units: 126th Infantry Regiment, 32nd Infantry Division
- Conflicts: World War II
- Awards: Medal of Honor; Silver Star; Purple Heart (2)

Leroy Johnson (December 6, 1919 – December 15, 1944) was a United States Army soldier and a recipient of the United States military's highest decoration, the Medal of Honor, for his actions in World War II. Camp Leroy Johnson in New Orleans, LA, was renamed after him in 1947.

== Biography ==
Johnson joined the Army from Oakdale, Louisiana on November 26, 1941 and was assigned to the 32nd Infantry Division. On April 6, 1943, Sgt. Johnson was awarded the Silver Star for gallantry in action against entrenched Japanese at Senananda. By December 15, 1944, he was serving as a Sergeant in Company K, 126th Infantry Regiment, 32nd Infantry Division during the Battle of Leyte. On that day, near Limon, Leyte, the Philippines, he smothered the blast of two enemy-thrown grenades with his body, sacrificing himself to protect those around him. For this action, he was posthumously awarded the Medal of Honor ten months later, on October 2, 1945.

Johnson was buried at the Manila American Cemetery in the Philippines. A bronze memorial plaque in his honor was mounted on the wall of the Allen Parish courthouse in Oberlin, Louisiana, a few miles south of his native Oakdale.

== Medal of Honor citation ==
Sergeant Johnson's official Medal of Honor citation reads:

He was squad leader of a 9-man patrol sent to reconnoiter a ridge held by a well-entrenched enemy force. Seeing an enemy machinegun position, he ordered his men to remain behind while he crawled to within 6 yards of the gun. One of the enemy crew jumped up and prepared to man the weapon. Quickly withdrawing, Sgt. Johnson rejoined his patrol and reported the situation to his commanding officer. Ordered to destroy the gun, which covered the approaches to several other enemy positions, he chose 3 other men, armed them with hand grenades, and led them to a point near the objective. After taking partial cover behind a log, the men had knocked out the gun and begun an assault when hostile troops on the flank hurled several grenades. As he started for cover, Sgt. Johnson saw 2 unexploded grenades which had fallen near his men. Knowing that his comrades would be wounded or killed by the explosion, he deliberately threw himself on the grenades and received their full charge in his body. Fatally wounded by the blast, he died soon afterward. Through his outstanding gallantry in sacrificing his life for his comrades, Sgt. Johnson provided a shining example of the highest traditions of the U.S. Army.

== Awards and decorations ==

Badge	Combat Infantryman Badge		
1st row	Medal of Honor	Silver Star	Bronze Star Medal
2nd row	Purple Heart with one oak leaf cluster	Army Good Conduct Medal	American Campaign Medal
3rd row	Asiatic-Pacific Campaign Medal with one campaign star	World War II Victory Medal	Philippine Liberation Medal

== See also ==
- List of Medal of Honor recipients for World War II
