= Fairview High School (Louisiana) =

Location
- 2310 North Sherman Street; Grant, (Allen Parish), Louisiana 70644; United States; 30.7891°N 92.9483°W

Information
- Type: Public high school
- School district: Allen Parish School Board
- Principal: Joshua Sampey
- Teaching staff: 36.00 (FTE)
- Enrollment: 387 (2024-2025)
- Student to teacher ratio: 10.75
- Colors: Black, gold, and white
- Mascot: Panther
- Nickname: Panthers
- Website: fhs.allen.k12.la.us

Fairview High School is a PK-12 school in Grant, unincorporated Allen Parish, Louisiana, United States. As of 2016 it usually has around 425 students. It is a part of the Allen Parish School Board.

== Athletics ==
Fairview High athletics competes in the LHSAA.
