= Oberlin High School (Louisiana) =

Public high school in Oberlin, LA, US

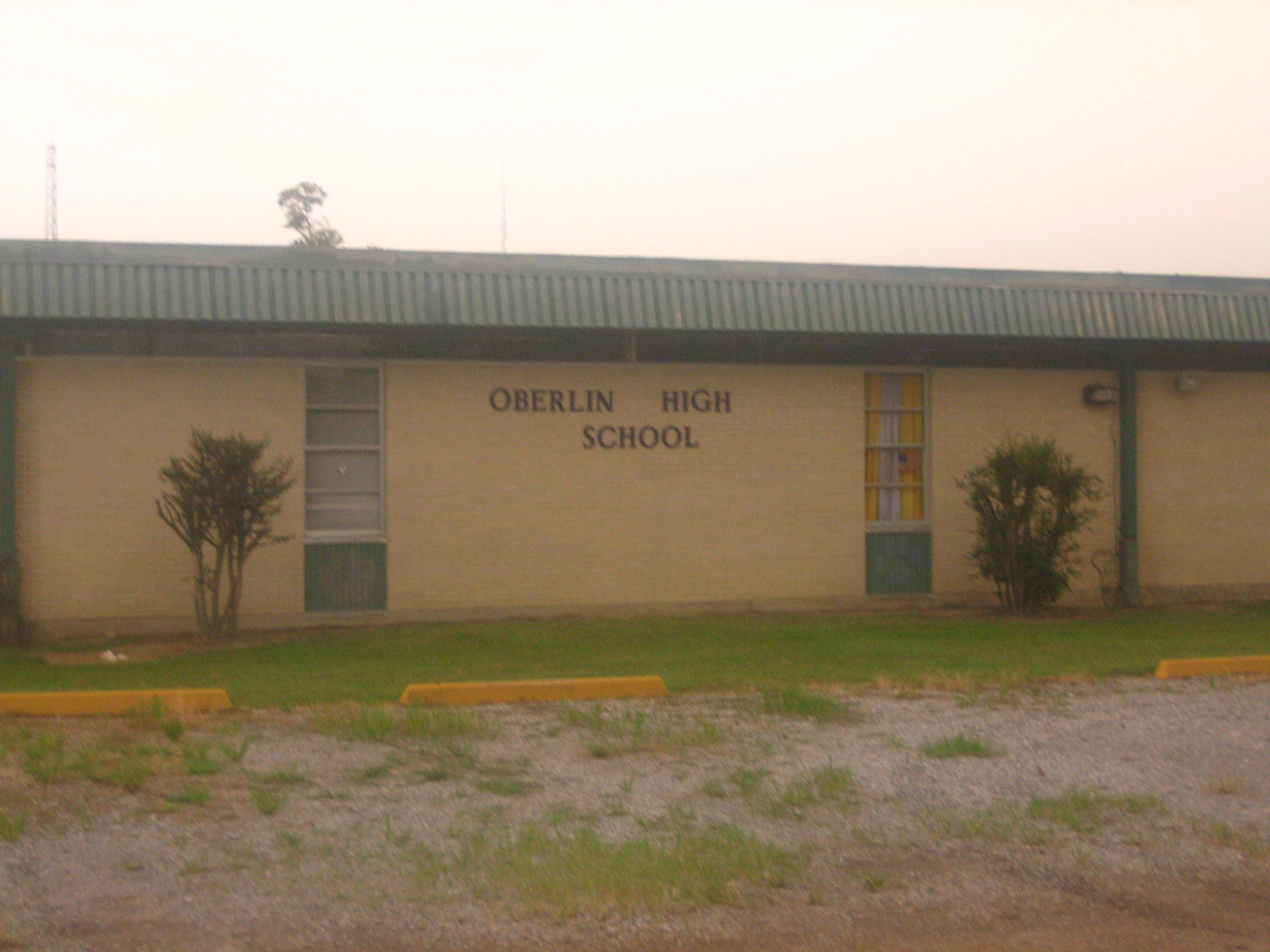

Location
- 1 Tiger Lane; Oberlin, (Allen Parish), Louisiana 70655; United States; 30.6188°N 92.7687°W

Information
- Type: Public high school
- Established: 1916
- School district: Allen Parish School Board
- Principal: Pam LeBoeuf
- Staff: 25.00 (FTE)
- Enrollment: 195 (2023-2024)
- Student to teacher ratio: 7.80
- Colors: Purple and gold
- Athletics conference: District 5-1A
- Mascot: Tiger
- Nickname: Tigers
- Website: Official website

Oberlin High School is a public high school for students in grades 7-12 in Oberlin, Louisiana. There are 223 students attending the school as of 2024, 40 percent of whom are minority students.

== History ==
A school was established in Oberlin even before the town's incorporation in 1900, with students attending a public school under teacher Mary Burger as far back as 1896. The Allen Parish Police Jury held its first meeting after the parish was cleaved from Imperial Calcasieu in 1912 in the old schoolhouse, which was loaned for the occasion by the town's board of education. The Oberlin school became a state-approved high school in 1916 with Mr. Hiram Lyles serving as the school's first official principal. The school's original gymnasium was built by the Works Progress Administration and designed by Charles T. Roberts. The building was finished in 1939, but torn down.

The earliest educational opportunities for Black members of the community came around the turn of the 20th century from local farmer Simmon Morehead, who taught the basics of arithmetic and writing. The first formal school for Blacks in Oberlin was held at the First Baptist Church of Oberlin. The school taught students in grades 1-7; any student wishing to continue their education were went to the Allen Parish Training School. Oberlin Colored School opened in 1943 for grades 1-7 with older students attending the segregated Allen High School in Oakdale. Oberlin got its own segregated high school in 1963 when the Oberlin Colored School was expanded by the Allen Parish School Board. The new school was named after Charles Phillip Adams, founding president of the Colored Industrial and Agricultural School, which later became Grambling State University. The school closed in 1970 after Allen Parish schools were integrated.

== Student achievement ==
Fifty-two percent of Oberlin High students scored at or above the proficient level in reading according to data gathered by U.S. News & World Report. However, just 22 percent of Oberlin students were proficient or above in math. This was well above the state average for reading, but slightly below state average for math.

== Incidents ==
On October 6, 2015, a man was found dead from a gunshot wound under the main awning at the front of the school. It was later determined the man was a parent of an Oberlin High student. Further investigation by the Allen Parish Sheriff's Office determined the man committed suicide.

In February 2018, a student was investigated for making potentially terroristic threats when the student commented in math class that the square root symbol resembled a firearm. Authorities then said the student being investigated made a comment that could be interpreted as a threat when taken out of context. Authorities conducted a full investigation and searched the student's home, but concluded there was no evidence that suggested the student had any intent to cause harm. The incident came just days after the Parkland high school shooting.

== Notable people ==
- Hoyle Granger (1961), former AFL and NFL running back.
