= Oakdale High School (Louisiana) =

High school in Louisiana, United States

Location
- 101 North 13th Street; Oakdale, (Allen Parish), Louisiana 71463; United States; 30.8157°N 92.6570°W

Information
- Type: Public high school
- Established: 1923
- School district: Allen Parish School Board
- Principal: Wilda Lynn Deville
- Staff: 23.00 (FTE)
- Enrollment: 322 (2023-2024)
- Student to teacher ratio: 14.00
- Colors: Purple and gold
- Athletics conference: District 4-2A
- Mascot: Warrior, specifically Native American
- Nickname: Warriors
- Yearbook: Tomahawk
- Website: okhs.allen.k12.la.us

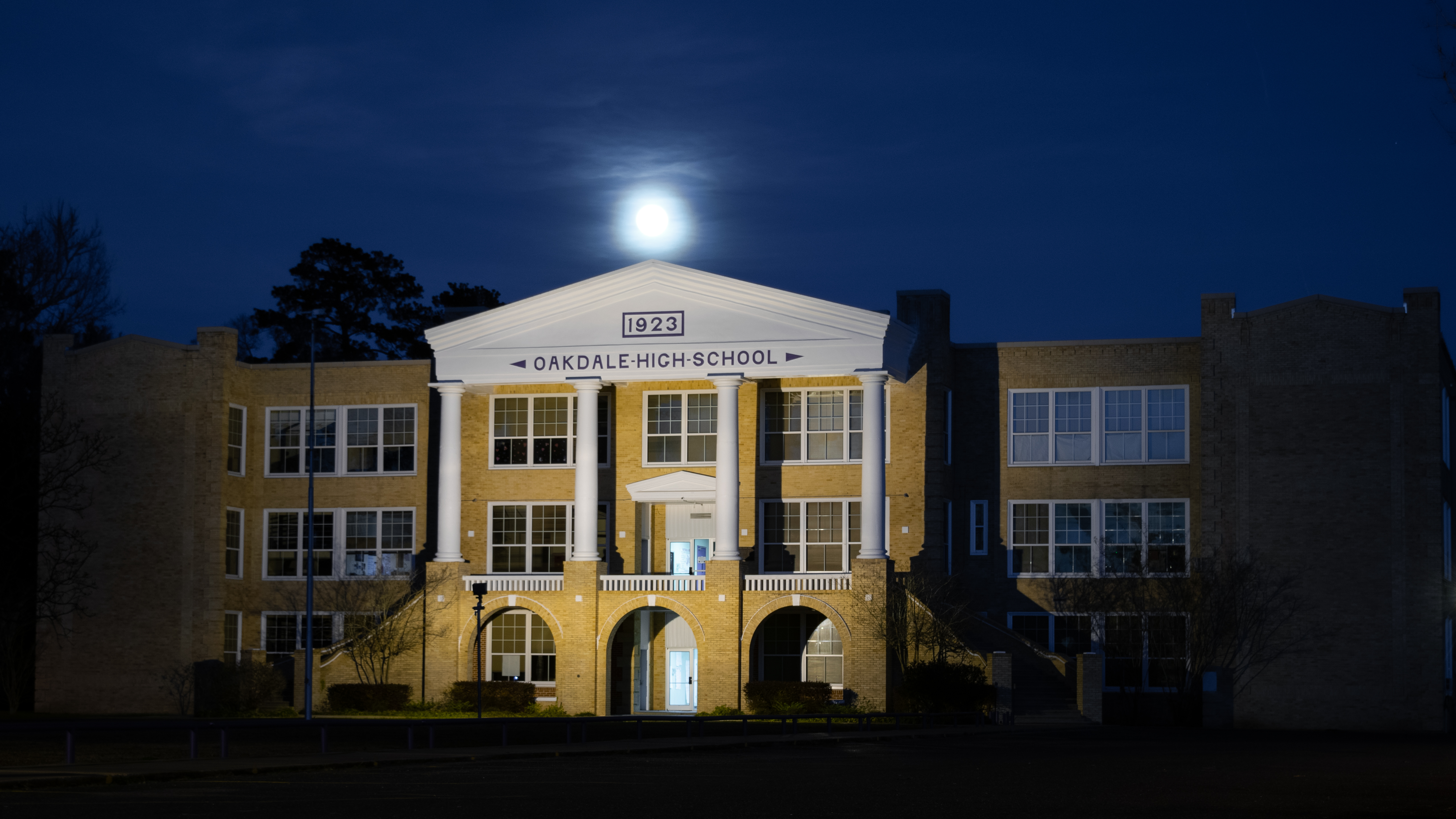
Oakdale High School

Oakdale High School is a senior high school in downtown Oakdale, Louisiana, United States. The current structure was established in 1923. OHS is a part of the Allen Parish School Board and opened in 1923.

== Athletics ==
Oakdale High athletics compete in the .

=== State Championships ===
Girls Basketball

- (8) 2023 & 2025

=== State Runners-Up ===
Boys Basketball

- (9) 1962
