= Leblanc, Louisiana =

Leblanc, Louisiana may refer to the following places in the U.S. state of Louisiana:

- LeBlanc, Louisiana, in Iberville Parish
- Le Blanc, Louisiana, in Acadia Parish
