= Grant, Louisiana =

- Unincorporated community
- Location within Louisiana Location within the United States
- Coordinates: 30°47′19″N 92°56′55″W
- Country: United States
- State: Louisiana
- Parish: Allen
- Elevation: 125 ft (38 m)
- Time zone: UTC-6 (Central (CST))
  - Summer (DST): UTC-5 (CDT)
- ZIP code: 70644
- Area code: 337
- GNIS feature ID: 543254

Grant is an unincorporated community in Allen Parish, Louisiana, United States. The community is located on Louisiana Highway 377, 16 miles (26 km) northwest of Oberlin. Grant has a post office with ZIP code 70644, which opened on July 3, 1894.

The Allen Parish School Board operates Fairview High School in Grant. Also, Allen Parish Fire Protection District 3 operates its main station and training facility in Grant. Northwest Allen Water District has its office in Grant as well. Both the fire district complex and water district office are just south of the high school on LA 377. Grant is considered the center of Ward Four of Allen Parish, although it is not an incorporated community. Two cemeteries serve the community: Palestine Cemetery beside Palestine Baptist Church and Hamilton Cemetery, both south of the high school. Historically, the bluff bank of Whiskey Chitto Creek near Palestine Baptist Church and Cemetery is considered the first area settled by "Saddler" Johnson in about 1816 and may be older than any permanent white settlement in Beauregard and western Allen parishes. It is not known if a native American village preceded it, although historical records show that at least two other early settlements in neighboring Beauregard Parish were located near prior existing native American villages.
