= Camp Leroy Johnson =

Coordinates: 30°01′49″N 90°02′44″W

Camp Leroy Johnson in New Orleans, Louisiana, was located on the south shore of Lake Pontchartrain in the area bounded west by Franklin Avenue, and east by Inner Harbor Navigation Canal. The camp was opened in 1942 as the New Orleans Army Air Base. The site was across the Inner Harbor Navigation Canal from the New Orleans Municipal Airport. In 1947 a formal ceremony was held at the New Orleans Port of Embarkation Personnel Center to rename the base after World War II Medal of Honor recipient Leroy Johnson. After 22 years of service the camp was closed on July 1, 1964, "for economic reasons".

Johnson was a native of Caney Creek near Oakdale, Louisiana, and served as a Sergeant, U.S. Army. He died on December 15, 1944, near Limon, Leyte, Philippine Islands, shortly after he threw himself on two unexploded Japanese grenades during an assault thus saving two comrades.

Portions of the original property retain military function with the James H. Diamond United States Army Reserve Center located on Leroy Johnson, Drive. The original site also houses the Federal Bureau of Investigation New Orleans Field Office, a portion of the Southern University of New Orleans campus, and the University of New Orleans East Campus including the Lakefront Arena. In 1987 portions of the former camp hosted 130,000 people as part of a pastoral visit by Pope John Paul II. Camp Leroy Johnson is sometimes confused with the original New Orleans Naval Air Station which was located further to the west at the site of the current main campus of the University of New Orleans.
