= Reeves High School =

Coordinates: 30°31′22″N 93°2′58″W

Location
- 13770 Highway 113; Reeves, Louisiana 70658; United States

Information
- School district: Allen Parish School Board
- CEEB code: 192520
- Principal: Brenda Green
- Teaching staff: 28.00 (FTE)
- Grades: PK–12
- Enrollment: 287 (2024-2025)
- Student to teacher ratio: 10.25
- Colors: Red, black, and white
- Athletics: LHSAA C
- Mascot: Raider
- Nickname: Red Raiders
- Website: rhs.apsb.us

Reeves High School is a primary and secondary school in Reeves, Louisiana, United States. The school serves approximately 300 students in pre-kindergarten through grade 12.

== History ==
Robert L. Frye, the Republican candidate for state education superintendent in 1972, began his educational career at Reeves High School in the late 1940s.

Reeves High went 8 years with a block schedule which consisted of four-day weeks which ran from 7:45 to 3:30. After low test scores the Allen Parish school board voted against it, which was met by negative reactions by village inhabitants and students alike. The new schedule consists of five-day weeks which run from 7:40 to 3:05 with seniors only leaving until after they got all the credits that they need to have to graduate. Few decided to get off of LA core 4 and go to basic so those few seniors only go to school for about 3–4 hours. Most of the seniors get out of school after 5th hour.

== Athletics ==
The school's athletic teams, known as the Reeves Red Raiders, compete in Louisiana High School Athletic Association size classification C.

Teams are fielded in baseball, basketball, softball, and track and field.
