= Mittie, Louisiana =

- Unincorporated community
- Location within Louisiana Location within the United States
- Coordinates: 30°42′25″N 92°54′25″W
- Country: United States
- State: Louisiana
- Parish: Allen
- Elevation: 92 ft (28 m)
- Time zone: UTC-6 (Central (CST))
  - Summer (DST): UTC-5 (CDT)
- ZIP code: 70654
- Area code: 337
- GNIS feature ID: 543479

Mittie is an unincorporated community in Allen Parish, Louisiana, United States. The community is located on Louisiana Highway 26, 10.5 miles (16.9 km) northwest of Oberlin. Mittie has a post office with ZIP code 70654.

Mittie is named after Mittie Burnett (Burnitt), the first postmaster. The post office was once located on the east side of Whiskey Chitto, but was moved to the west side by Clinton Smith and his wife Oma Simmons Smith, who had the post office located inside Smith's Grocery, now Highway 26 Convenience. Mittie has been located in present site since 1929. The original post office was the Simmons post office near south Ten Mile Road established in 1890. This post office was renamed the Mittie post office in late 1916. Albert Burnett served as postmaster of Simmons post office and his daughter Mittie as first postmaster of Mittie. Whiskey Chitto Creek runs between the two locations of Mittie. This section of the stream was the site of the beginning of the Calcasieu Log War of 1877-1879, when federal agents virtually shut down logging operations along the streams of Imperial Calcasieu Parish. See article on Whiskey Chitto Creek. Simmons Settlement on the east side of Whiskey Chitto was settled by the Simmons family just before the Civil War. Simmons Cemetery dates back to November 17, 1862.
