= Allen Parish School Board =

School district in Louisiana, United States

Coordinates: 30°37′20″N 92°46′6″W

Address
- 1111 West 7th Avenue PO Drawer C Oberlin, Allen Parish, Louisiana, 70655; United States

District information
- Type: Public
- Grades: PK-12
- Superintendent: Brad Soileau

Students and staff
- Students: Approximately of 4,300

Other information
- Website: www.apsb.us

Allen Parish School Board is a school district headquartered in Oberlin in Allen Parish in southwestern Louisiana, United States.

Its boundaries are that of the entire parish.

From 1960 to 1969, Dorothy Sue Hill, the state representative for Allen, Beauregard, and Calcasieu parishes, taught home economics for Allen Parish schools.

== History ==
In 1992, the district was progressing on plans to open a new headquarters.

== Schools ==
=== PK-12 schools ===
- Elizabeth High School (Elizabeth)
- Fairview High School (Grant, Unincorporated area)
- Reeves High School (Reeves)

=== 7-12 schools ===
- Oberlin High School (Oberlin)

=== High schools ===
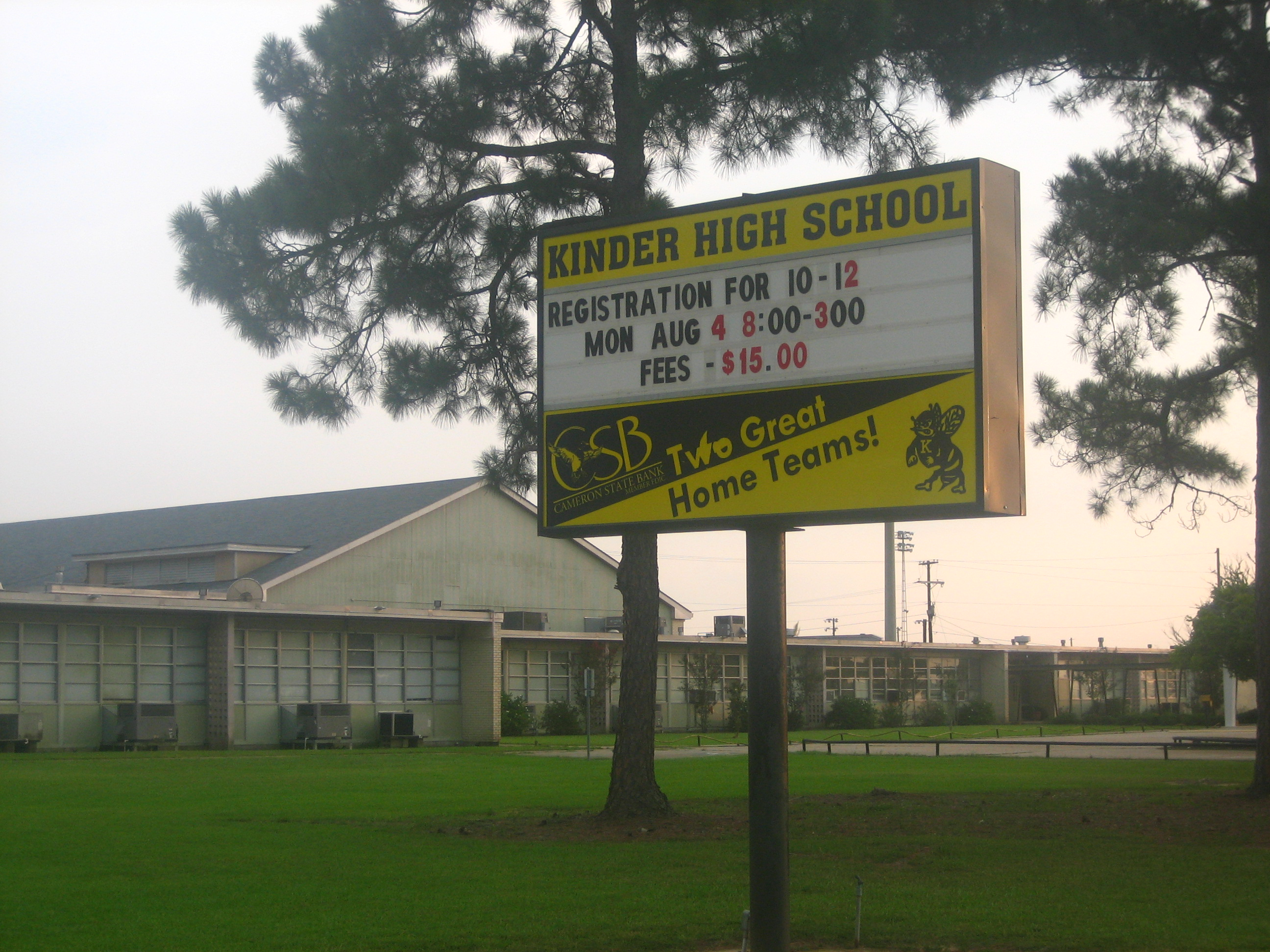
Kinder High School

- Kinder High School (Unincorporated area)
- Oakdale High School (Oakdale)

=== Middle schools ===
==== 5-8 ====
- Oakdale Middle School (Oakdale)

==== 5-8 ====
- Kinder Middle School (Kinder)

=== Elementary schools ===
==== PK-6 ====
- Oberlin Elementary School (Oberlin)

==== PK-4 ====
- Kinder Elementary School (Kinder)

==== PK-4 ====
- Oakdale Elementary School (Oakdale)
