= Genius Brothers Building =

- U.S. National Register of Historic Places
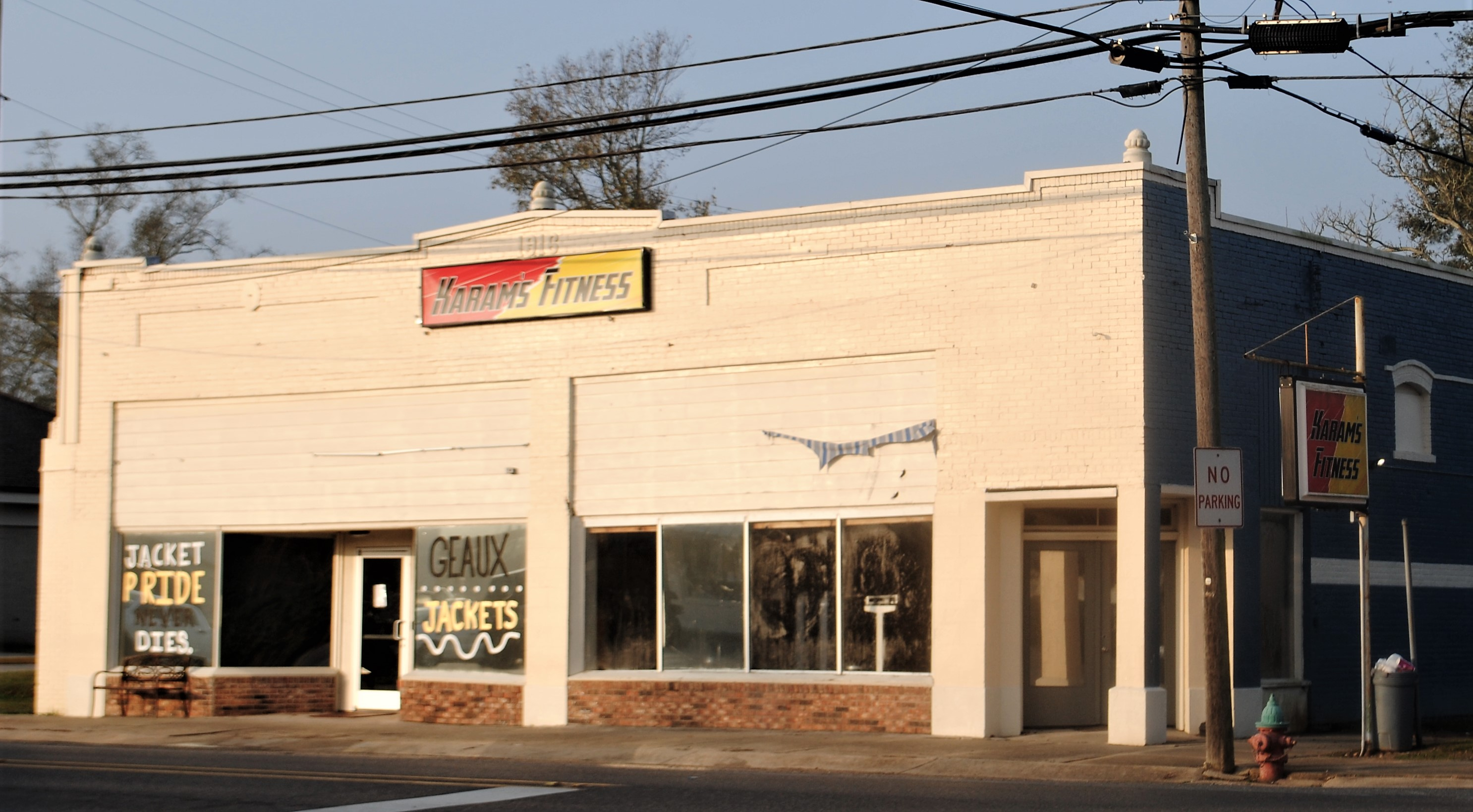
- The building in 2021

- Location within Louisiana
- Location: Jct. of 8th St. and 4th Ave., Kinder, Louisiana
- Coordinates: 30°29′14″N 92°51′01″W
- Area: less than one acre
- Built: 1916
- Architectural style: Vernacular Commercial
- NRHP reference No.: 90000909
- Added to NRHP: June 27, 1990

The Genius Brothers Building, in Kinder, Louisiana, was built in 1916 and was listed on the National Register of Historic Places in 1990.

It is located at the corner of 8th St. and 4th Ave. in Kinder.

Architecture: Vernacular Commercial

It "is a single story brick commercial vernacular structure located on Eighth Street in the small town of Kinder. There have been some alterations over the years, but the building's architectural identity survives well intact. / Laid up in common bond brick, the building features two shopfronts, one of which has a corner entrance. Originally, it contained two separate stores. The original metal fixed awning is surmounted by a transom level (windows covered over) and a paneled parapet. The parapet top culminates in a central pediment shape and is surmounted by three concrete pineapple finials. The shopfronts retain their original shape and configuration, although the glass and kickplates are replacements. An interesting feature of the shopfront level is that the piers are coated with concrete which is lightly scored to resemble cut stone. The rear and north side of the building feature segmentally arched openings, most of which have been bricked in, although the outlines are clearly visible. The south side of the building is a party wall which formerly divided it from an adjacent commercial building. This adjacent building was recently demolished. To prevent moisture penetration at the top of the former party wall, the present owner applied a strip of standing seam metal sheathing (about 3 feet in height). The interior is modern looking, with plywood paneling and a lowered acoustical tile ceiling. The original pressed metal ceiling is still in place above the acoustical tiles. In addition, the old beaded board walls appear to be still intact beneath the plywood paneling. The only other noteworthy interior alteration has been the removal of the brick wall which previously divided the two shops."
