= R. Dewith Carrier =

American politician

Member of the Louisiana House of Representatives from the 32nd district
- Incumbent
- Assumed office January 13, 2020
- Preceded by: Dorothy Hill

Personal details
- Party: Republican
- Education: McNeese State University

R. Dewith Carrier is an American politician serving as a member of the Louisiana House of Representatives from the 32nd district, representing parts of Allen Parish, Beauregard Parish, Calcasieu Parish, and Jefferson Davis Parish. He first assumed office on January 13, 2020, as well as January 8, 2023.

== Career ==
Carrier was first elected to the 32nd district after receiving 64.3% of the vote on October 12, 2019, leaving Herman Ray Hill with 26.8% and Kristian Poncho with 8.9%. In 2023, he was re-elected after running unopposed.
