= Kinder, Louisiana =

- Town
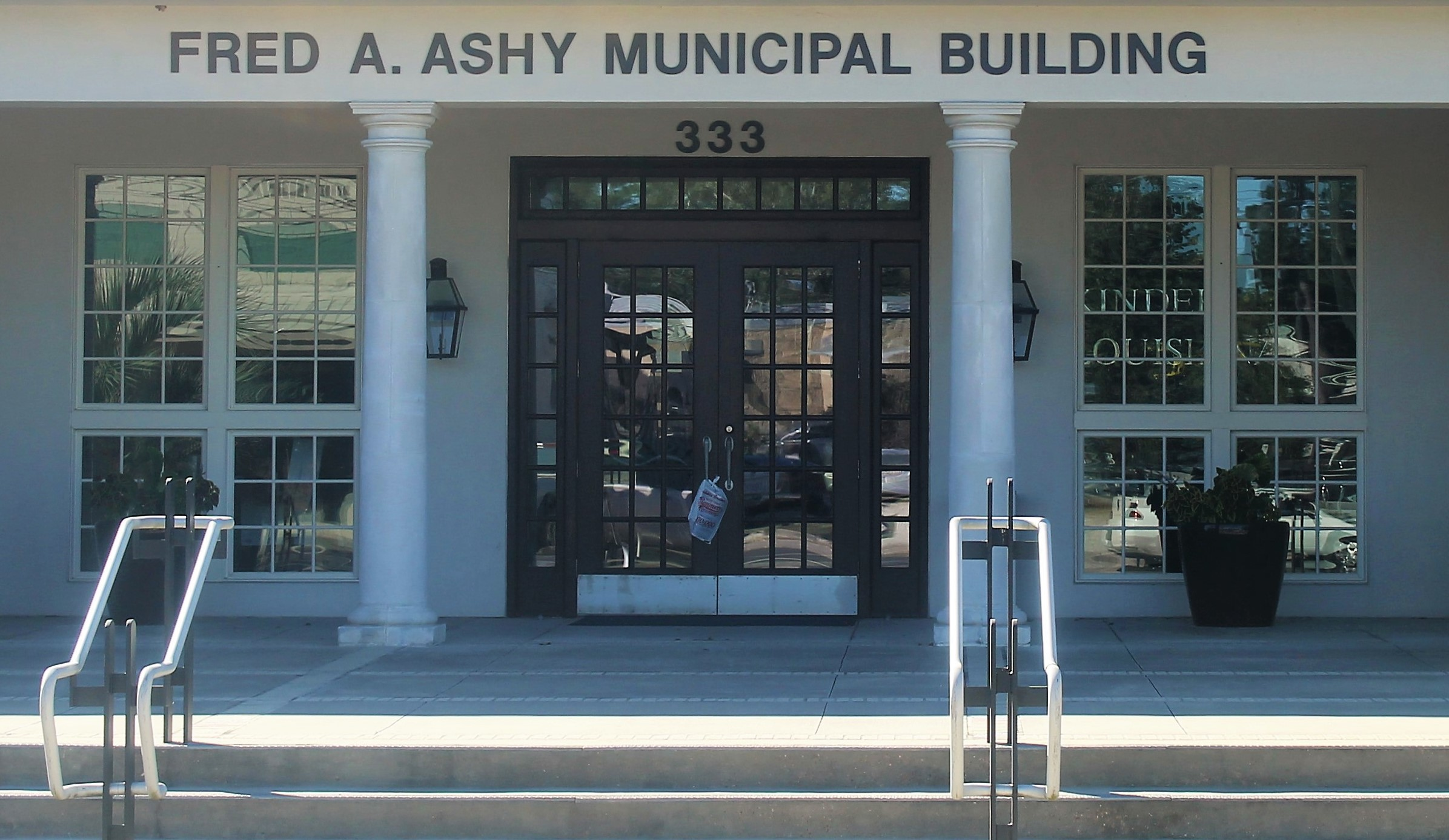
- Ashy Municipal Building is named for former Kinder Mayor Fred A. Ashy

- Location of Kinder in Allen Parish, Louisiana.

- Location of Louisiana in the United States
- Coordinates: 30°29′01″N 92°51′03″W
- Country: United States
- State: Louisiana
- Parish: Allen
- Town: 1911

Government
  - Type: Mayor and Town Council

Area
  - Total: 5.53 sq mi (14.31 km^{2})
  - Land: 5.53 sq mi (14.31 km^{2})
  - Water: 0 sq mi (0.00 km^{2})
- Elevation: 46 ft (14 m)

Population (2020)
  - Total: 2,170
  - Density: 392.7/sq mi (151.64/km^{2})
- Time zone: UTC-6 (CST)
  - Summer (DST): UTC-5 (CDT)
- ZIP code: 70648
- Area code: 337
- FIPS code: 22-39755
- GNIS feature ID: 2405949
- Website: townofkinder.com

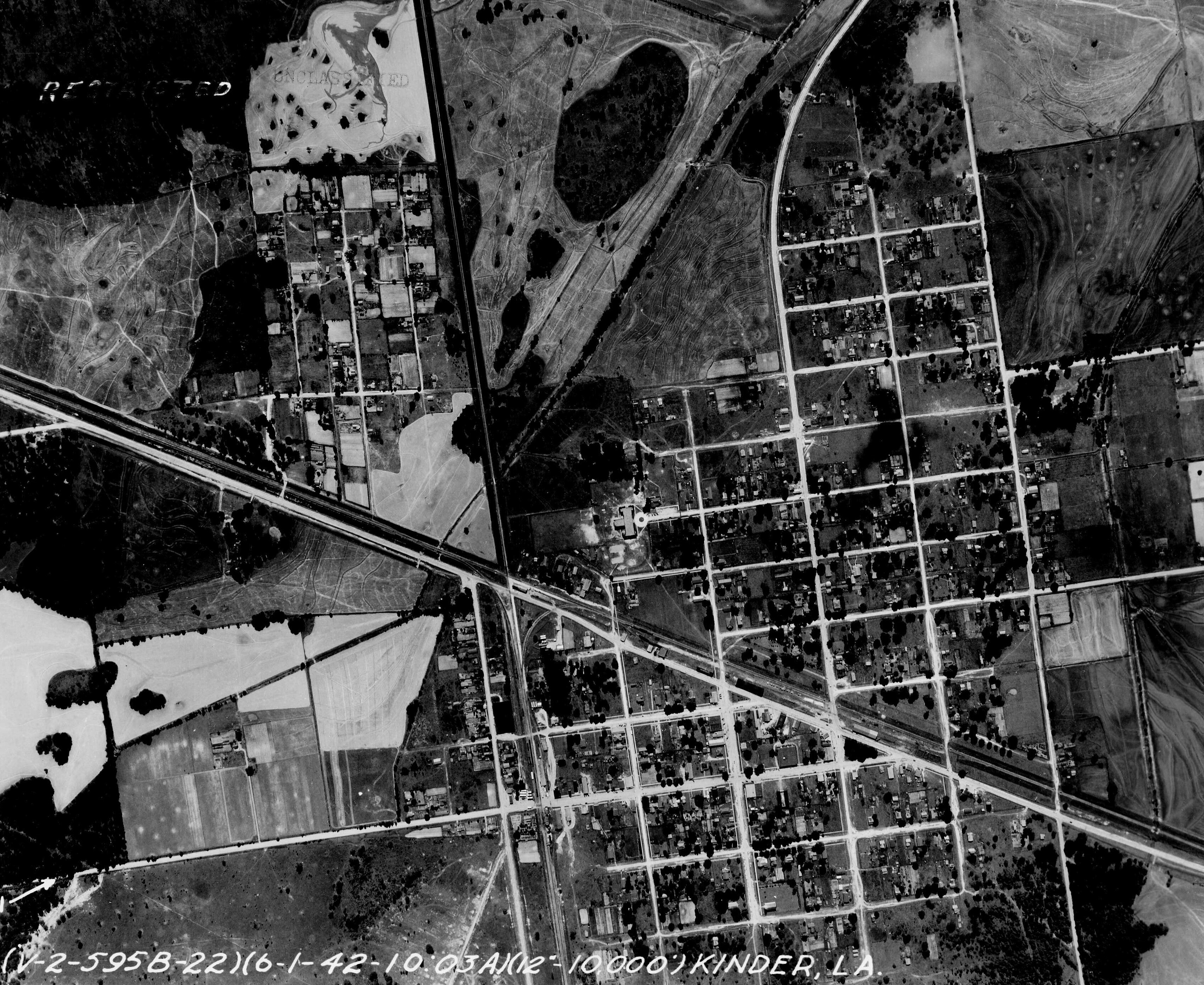
Kinder in 1942

Kinder is a small town in Allen Parish, Louisiana, in the United States. As of the 2020 census, Kinder had a population of 2,170.

The Lieutenant Douglas B. Fournet Memorial Park, an American Legion enterprise, was dedicated on June 11, 1988, in Kinder to remember those who died in military service to the nation.

Kinder was the birthplace of the late Mayor J. Rayburn Bertrand of Lafayette, who served from 1960 to 1972 and presided over the near doubling of the municipal population.

Kinder is home to Coushatta Casino Resort, the largest casino resort in Louisiana. The resort includes Koasati Pines, an 18-hole par 72 championship layout golf course.

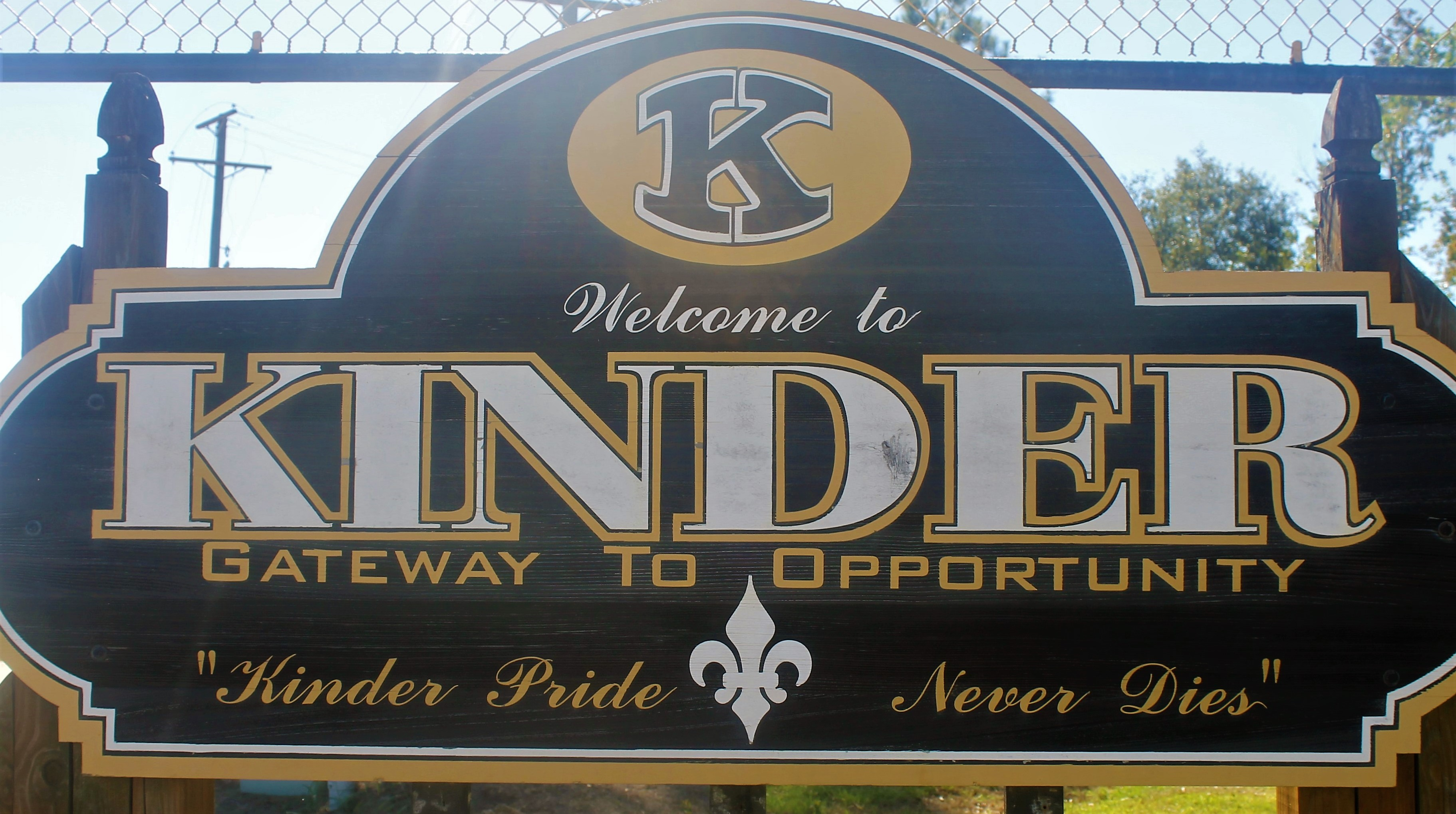
Kinder welcome sign

== History ==
James A. Kinder, a Union soldier, went south during the Civil War and after the war, he returned to the state, settling first in Rapides Parish in 1870, then moving south to Kinder. He homesteaded a Soldier's Land Grant of 138.77 acres (56.16 ha) and built a home and store where Highway 165 and Highway 190 now intersect. His customers called the store Kinder's Store.

Jabez Bunting Watkins brought the Watkins, Kansas City and Gulf Railroad through Kinder, and purchased Kinder's land in 1892. Kinder moved to Lake Charles.

After buying Kinder's property, JB Watkins brought in a surveyor, John W. Rhorer, to make a plat and lay out town streets for a company town. In 1903, Louisiana Gov. William Heard issued a proclamation declaring the site the Village of Kinder.

Among the first families who came to Kinder, all employees of Watkins Enterprises, were Milton B. McRill, John M. Houston and Philetus Philbrick. McRill joined JB Watkins' venture as a railroad contractor. His job was to build 100 miles (160 km) of railway from Alexandria to Lake Charles. McRill bought lots at the corner of Ninth Street and Fourth Avenue and built the first home in Kinder. McRill, who became one of the early mayors of Kinder, often provided lodging and meals for teachers because he believed strongly in education.

John M. Houston came south to serve as office manager and surveyor for the railroad Watkins was building. About 35 miles (56 km) before the railroad reached Lake Charles, Houston selected and purchased a tract of timber land. He built a sawmill and commissary on the tract north of Kinder, alongside the railroad, to enable him to ship logs to other states. Houston's commissary became known as the "Houston spur".

Philetus Philbrick came south from the University of Iowa, where he had helped set up the Department of Engineering and taught there for 14 years. It was Philbrick's knowledge of railroading that brought him in contact with Watkins, then south to Kinder as a railroad surveyor. Philetus wrote to his brother Franklin, telling him of the available and fertile farmland. Franklin brought his family south and bought a farm north of Kinder. There was no school then, and the state would not furnish a teacher until the school had operated for three months. Franklin Philbrick opened the school and taught without pay in the small, rough-plank building.

Many other settlers came from the Midwestern states during the JB Watkins era of 1880 to 1900. At that time Watkins was spending enormous sums of money promoting his "Garden of Eden" in southwest Louisiana. Among the new settlers were families named Storer, Mayfield, Jones, Phelps, Mayes, Reynolds, Johnson, Harvey, Leeds and Oden.

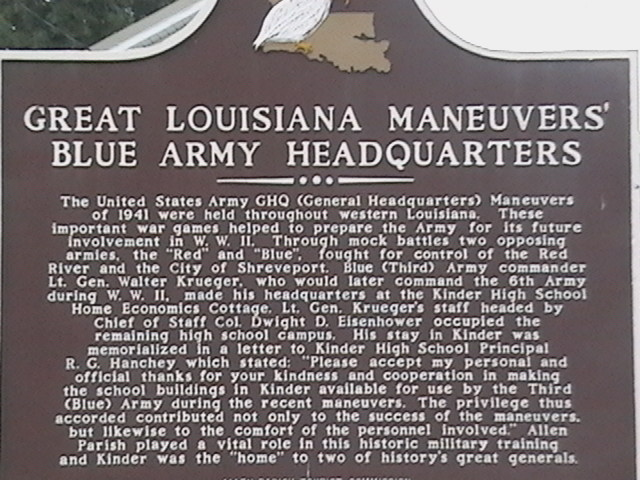

By 1903, when Kinder officially became a village, other families had arrived. They included Patrick E. Moore, who was appointed the first mayor, and four men who became aldermen Dr. R.E. Oden, Fred Moore, Edoc Roza and J.W. Kingrey.

In 1911, Kinder had a population of 1,088, thereby entitling it to be classified as a town. Gov. Jared Young Sanders proclaimed Kinder a town on March 4, 1911.

The mayors from 1903 on were Patrick Moore, Jack Dempsey, Dr. R.E. Oden, W.C. McNann, M.B. McRill, Randall H. Odom, J. W. Kingrey, S.R. Kingrey, D.T. Slocum, W.D. Horn, William Marcantel, E.E. Migues, Percy LeLand, Lee St. Romain, Cledius LaFargue, Fred Ashy, for whom the municipal building is named, and Estes Ledoux.

=== Louisiana Maneuvers ===
Kinder was used as the headquarters for the Blue Army during the Louisiana Maneuvers preceding the United States entry into WWII. A roadside marker commemorates the occasion.

== Geography ==
According to the United States Census Bureau, the town has a total area of 5.5 square miles (14.3 km^{2}), all land.

== Demographics ==
Historical population
Census	Pop.	Note	%±
1910	635		—
1920	1,148		80.8%
1930	962		−16.2%
1940	1,416		47.2%
1950	2,003		41.5%
1960	2,299		14.8%
1970	2,307		0.3%
1980	2,603		12.8%
1990	2,246		−13.7%
2000	2,148		−4.4%
2010	2,477		15.3%
2020	2,170		−12.4%
2025 (est.)	2,091	▼	−3.6%
U.S. Decennial Census

=== 2020 census ===
Kinder racial composition
Race	Number	Percentage
White (non-Hispanic)	1,480	68.2%
Black or African American (non-Hispanic)	453	20.88%
Native American	44	2.03%
Asian	27	1.24%
Pacific Islander	1	0.05%
Other/Mixed	100	4.61%
Hispanic or Latino	65	3.0%

As of the 2020 United States census, there were 2,170 people, 973 households, and 649 families residing in the town.

=== 2000 census ===
As of the census of 2000, there were 2,148 people, 848 households, and 576 families residing in the town. The population density was 1,311.4 inhabitants per square mile (506.3/km^{2}). There were 950 housing units at an average density of 580.0 per square mile (223.9/km^{2}). The racial makeup of the town was 73.79% White, 22.30% African American, 1.26% Native American, 1.07% Asian, 0.09% Pacific Islander, 0.19% from other races, and 1.30% from two or more races. Hispanic or Latino of any race were 1.02% of the population.

There were 848 households, out of which 36.4% had children under the age of 18 living with them, 44.0% were married couples living together, 19.8% had a female householder with no husband present, and 32.0% were non-families. 28.9% of all households were made up of individuals, and 13.9% had someone living alone who was 65 years of age or older. The average household size was 2.42 and the average family size was 2.97.

In the town, the population was spread out, with 28.6% under the age of 18, 8.1% from 18 to 24, 26.2% from 25 to 44, 19.4% from 45 to 64, and 17.7% who were 65 years of age or older. The median age was 35 years. For every 100 females, there were 84.1 males. For every 100 females age 18 and over, there were 75.3 males.

The median income for a household in the town was $25,493, and the median income for a family was $31,799. Males had a median income of $28,015 versus $19,015 for females. The per capita income for the town was $13,187. About 19.6% of families and 20.2% of the population were below the poverty line, including 23.6% of those under age 18 and 25.8% of those age 65 or over.

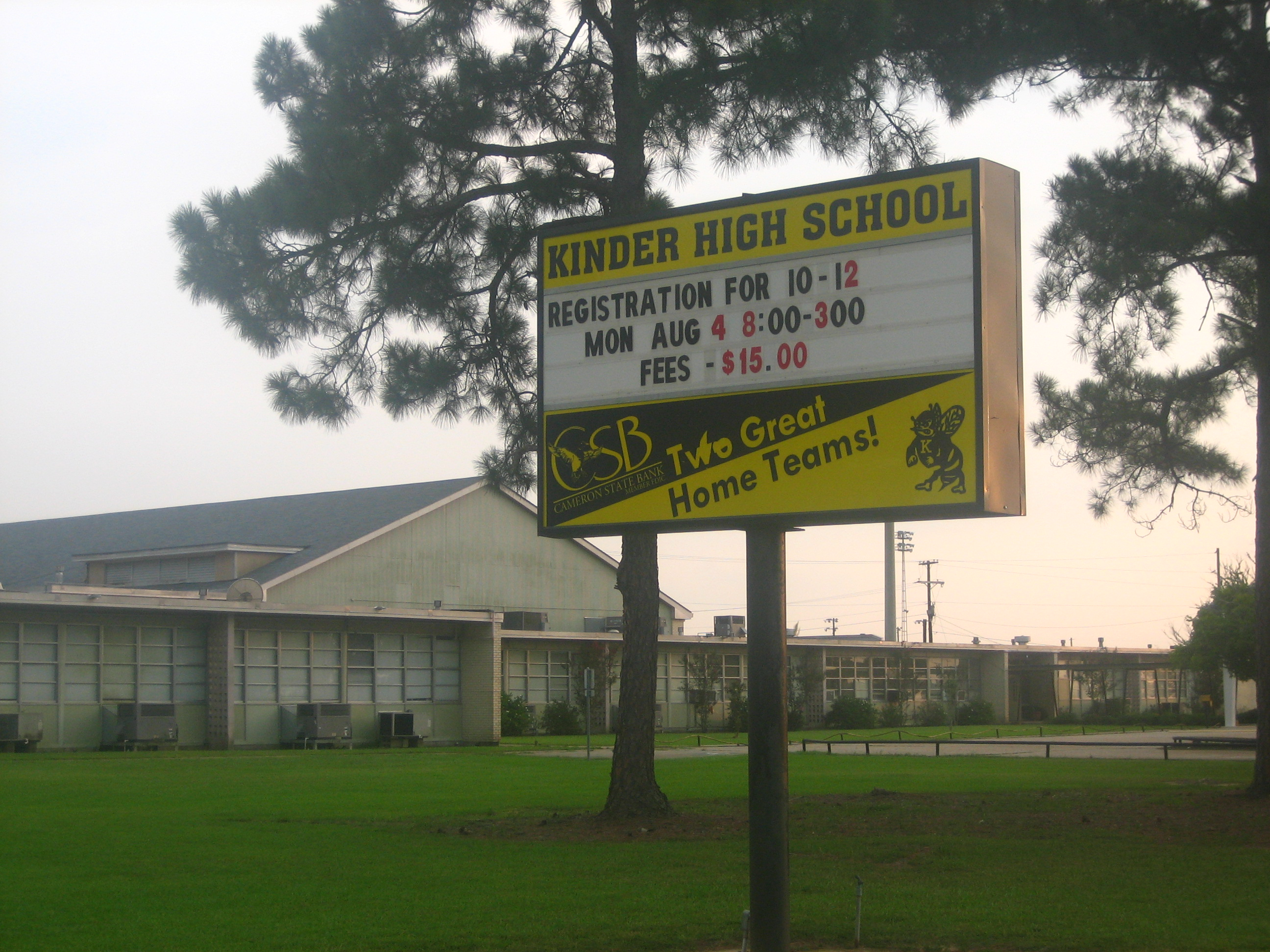
Kinder High School

== Education ==
Allen Parish Public Schools operates:

- Kinder High School
- Kinder Middle School
- Kinder Elementary School

== Notable people ==
- Roy Brown, Blues musician
- Douglas B. Fournet, United States Army officer and posthumous recipient of the Medal of Honor during the Vietnam War
- Beau Jocque, zydeco musician
- Blake Trahan, former professional baseball player

== See also ==
- Genius Brothers Building
