= Douglas B. Fournet =

Douglas Bernard Fournet
- Army Medal of Honor
- Born: May 7, 1943; Lake Charles, Louisiana, US
- Died: May 4, 1968 (aged 24); A Shau Valley, Republic of Vietnam
- Military career
- Allegiance: United States
- Branch: United States Army
- Service years: 1966–1968
- Rank: First Lieutenant
- Units: Company B, 1st Battalion, 7th Cavalry Regiment, 1st Cavalry Division (Airmobile)
- Conflicts: Vietnam War †
- Awards: Medal of Honor; Bronze Star; Purple Heart

Douglas Bernard Fournet (May 7, 1943 – May 4, 1968) was a United States Army officer and a recipient of the United States military's highest decoration—the Medal of Honor—for his actions in the Vietnam War.

== Biography ==
Born on May 7, 1943, in Kinder, Louisiana, Fournet attended McNeese State University in Lake Charles, Louisiana.

Fournet joined the Army from New Orleans, Louisiana in 1966, and went through Officer Candidate School at Fort Benning. By May 4, 1968, was serving as a first lieutenant in Company B, 1st Battalion, 7th Cavalry Regiment, 1st Cavalry Division (Airmobile). During a firefight on that day, in the A Shau Valley, South Vietnam, during Operation Delaware, Fournet was killed while attempting to disable an enemy Claymore mine. He shielded his fellow soldiers from the blast with his body, preventing serious wounds to everyone but himself. His squadron leader, Bill Krahl, recovered his body, for which Krahl was awarded a Bronze Star.

He and his wife Marilyn Grissett had a son, Bill Fournet, who was born after his father's death.

A portion of Interstate 210 which loops around Lake Charles was named the "Douglas Fournet Expressway" in the fall of 2001. On July 3, 2010, he and four other Medal of Honor recipients with ties to Louisiana were inducted into the Louisiana Military Hall of Fame and Museum in Abbeville.

== Medal of Honor citation ==
First Lieutenant Fournet's official Medal of Honor citation reads:

For conspicuous gallantry and intrepidity in action at the risk of his life above and beyond the call of duty. 1st Lt. Fournet, Infantry, distinguished himself in action while serving as rifle platoon leader of the 2d Platoon, Company B. While advancing uphill against fortified enemy positions in the A Shau Valley, the platoon encountered intense sniper fire, making movement very difficult. The right flank man suddenly discovered an enemy claymore mine covering the route of advance and shouted a warning to his comrades. Realizing that the enemy would also be alerted, 1st Lt. Fournet ordered his men to take cover and ran uphill toward the mine, drawing a sheath knife as he approached it. With complete disregard for his safety and realizing the imminent danger to members of his command, he used his body as a shield in front of the mine as he attempted to slash the control wires leading from the enemy positions to the mine. As he reached for the wire the mine was detonated, killing him instantly. Five men nearest the mine were slightly wounded, but 1st Lt. Fournet's heroic and unselfish act spared his men of serious injury or death. His gallantry and willing self-sacrifice are in keeping with the highest traditions of the military service and reflect great credit upon himself, his unit, and the U.S. Army.

== See also ==
- List of Medal of Honor recipients for the Vietnam War
- Cemetery Memorial by La-Cemeteries
