= Reeves, Louisiana =

- Village
- Location of Reeves in Allen Parish, Louisiana.

- Location of Louisiana in the United States
- Coordinates: 30°31′18″N 93°02′34″W
- Country: United States
- State: Louisiana
- Parish: Allen

Area
  - Total: 2.42 sq mi (6.27 km^{2})
  - Land: 2.42 sq mi (6.26 km^{2})
  - Water: 0.0039 sq mi (0.01 km^{2})
- Elevation: 59 ft (18 m)

Population (2020)
  - Total: 221
  - Density: 91/sq mi (35.3/km^{2})
- Time zone: UTC-6 (CST)
  - Summer (DST): UTC-5 (CDT)
- Area code: 337
- FIPS code: 22-64100
- GNIS feature ID: 2407535
- Website: reevesla.gov

Reeves is a village in Allen Parish, Louisiana, United States. As of the 2020 census, Reeves had a population of 221.

== Geography ==
According to the United States Census Bureau, the village has a total area of 2.4 square miles (6.3 km^{2}), all land.

== Demographics ==
Historical population
| Census | Pop. | Note | %± |
|---|---|---|---|
| 1920 | 243 | | — |
| 1930 | 139 | | −42.8% |
| 1940 | 120 | | −13.7% |
| 1950 | 106 | | −11.7% |
| 1960 | 151 | | 42.5% |
| 1970 | 214 | | 41.7% |
| 1980 | 199 | | −7.0% |
| 1990 | 188 | | −5.5% |
| 2000 | 209 | | 11.2% |
| 2010 | 232 | | 11.0% |
| 2020 | 221 | | −4.7% |
| 2025 (est.) | 227 | ▲ | 2.7% |
U.S. Decennial Census

As of the census of 2000, there were 209 people, 82 households, and 57 families residing in the village. The population density was 86.9 inhabitants per square mile (33.6/km^{2}). There were 91 housing units at an average density of 37.8 per square mile (14.6/km^{2}). The racial makeup of the village was 97.61% White, 0.96% African American, 0.96% from other races, and 0.48% from two or more races.

There were 82 households, out of which 40.2% had children under the age of 18 living with them, 46.3% were married couples living together, 17.1% had a female householder with no husband present, and 29.3% were non-families. 28.0% of all households were made up of individuals, and 12.2% had someone living alone who was 65 years of age or older. The average household size was 2.55 and the average family size was 3.03.

In the village, the population was spread out, with 30.6% under the age of 18, 7.7% from 18 to 24, 29.2% from 25 to 44, 21.1% from 45 to 64, and 11.5% who were 65 years of age or older. The median age was 35 years. For every 100 females, there were 99.0 males. For every 100 females age 18 and over, there were 90.8 males.

The median income for a household in the village was $19,375, and the median income for a family was $20,000. Males had a median income of $26,667 versus $13,750 for females. The per capita income for the village was $9,101. About 26.1% of families and 30.3% of the population were below the poverty line, including 46.6% of those under the age of eighteen and 9.1% of those 65 or over.

== Education ==
Allen Parish School Board operates the PK-12 school Reeves High School.
