= LeBlanc, Louisiana =

- Unincorporated community
- Location within Louisiana Location within the United States
- Coordinates: 30°14′20″N 91°05′08″W
- Country: United States
- State: Louisiana
- Parish: Iberville
- Elevation: 16 ft (4.9 m)
- Time zone: UTC-6 (Central (CST))
  - Summer (DST): UTC-5 (CDT)
- Area code: 225
- GNIS feature ID: 555008

LeBlanc is an unincorporated community in Iberville Parish, Louisiana, United States. The community is 1.5 miles (2.4 km) southeast of St. Gabriel.
