= Allen Parish, Louisiana =

Parish in Louisiana, United States

Allen Parish
- Parish
- Parish of Allen; Paroisse d'Allen (French)
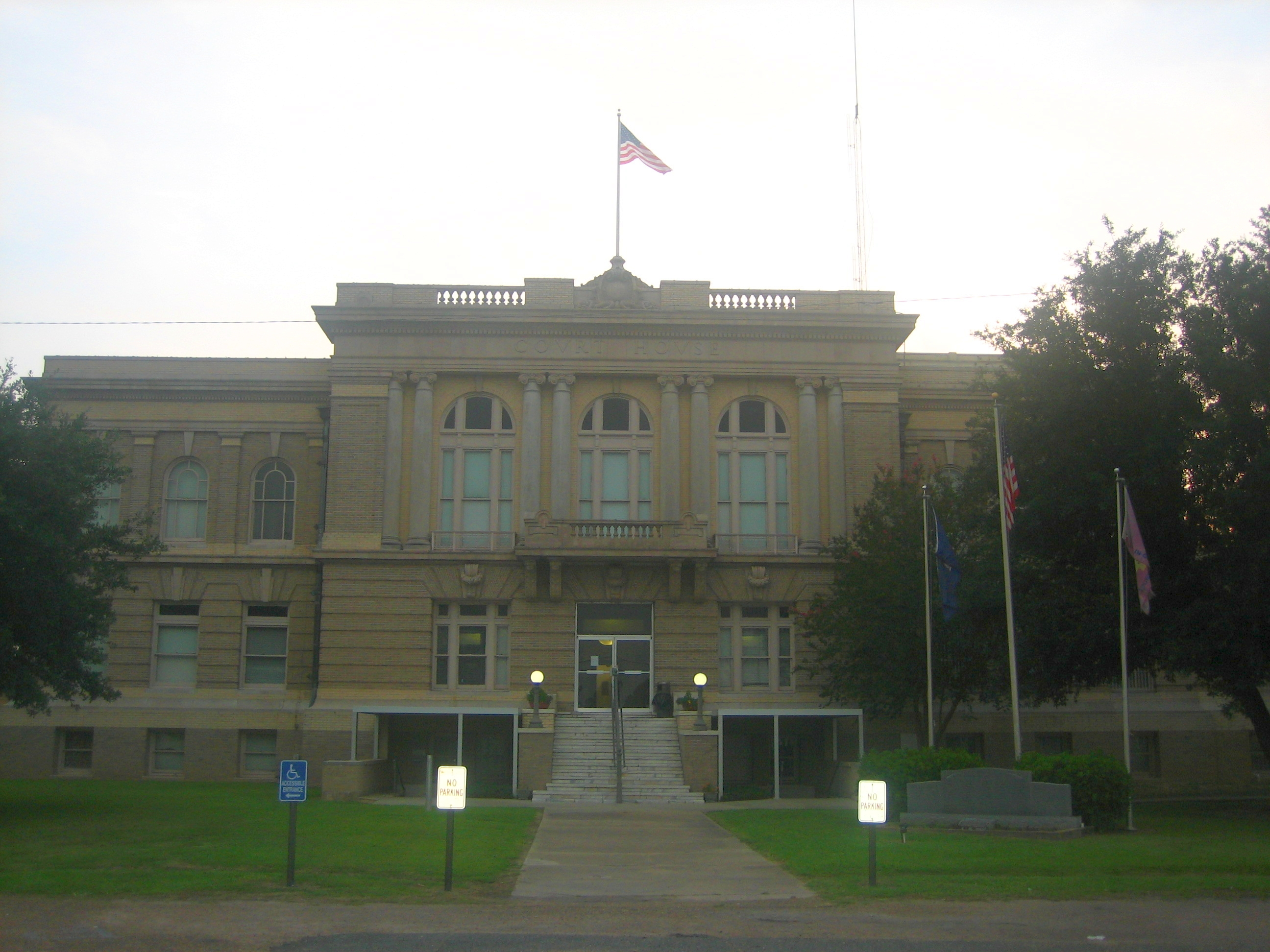
- Allen Parish Courthouse in Oberlin (near sunset)

- Seal Logo

- Location within the U.S. state of Louisiana
- Coordinates: 30.66°N 92.83°W
- Country: United States
- State: Louisiana
- Founded: 1912
- Named for: Henry Watkins Allen
- Seat: Oberlin
- Largest city: Oakdale

Area
  - Total: 766 sq mi (1,980 km^{2})
  - Land: 762 sq mi (1,970 km^{2})
  - Water: 4.1 sq mi (11 km^{2}) 0.5%

Population (2020)
  - Total: 22,750
  - Estimate (2025): 22,672 ▼
  - Density: 29.9/sq mi (11.5/km^{2})
- Time zone: UTC−6 (Central)
  - Summer (DST): UTC−5 (CDT)
- Area code: 318; 337
- Congressional district: 4th
- Website: www.allenparish.com

Allen Parish (French: Paroisse d'Allen) is a parish located in the U.S. state of Louisiana. As of the 2020 census, the population was 22,750. The parish seat is Oberlin and the largest city is Oakdale. Allen Parish is in southwestern Louisiana, southwest of Alexandria.

Allen Parish is named for former Confederate States Army general and Governor of Louisiana Henry Watkins Allen. It was separated in 1912 from the larger Calcasieu Parish to the southwest.

== Geography ==
According to the U.S. Census Bureau, the parish has a total area of 766 square miles (1,980 km^{2}), of which 762 square miles (1,970 km^{2}) is land and 4.1 square miles (11 km^{2}) (0.5%) is water.

Allen Parish is bordered on the east by Evangeline Parish, on the south by Jefferson Davis Parish, and on the west by Beauregard Parish. Rapides Parish and Vernon Parish both border Allen Parish on the north. Allen Parish may be considered to belong to either the Southwest Louisiana region or to Central Louisiana. It is bordered on the east by Acadiana (Evangeline Parish). Part of Allen Parish, west of the Calcasieu River, lies within the historical "No Man's Land" or Neutral Ground of disputed territory between the US and Spain.

The geologic composition of Allen Parish, like most of Louisiana, is clay and mud.

Ecoregionally, Allen Parish primarily lies within the South Central Plains (USGS ecoregion 35), particularly the Flatwoods (ecoregion 35f), but also a bit of the Southern Tertiary Uplands (35e) in the northwestern corner of the parish. The southeastern corner of the parish, is in the Western Gulf Coastal Plain (ecoregion 34), specifically the Northern Humid Gulf Coastal Prairies (34a). The Calcasieu river forms the primary boundary between the piney woods and prairie regions of the parish.

=== Waterways ===
- Bundick Creek
- Calcasieu River
- Ouiski Chitto Creek
- Six Mile Creek
- Ten Mile Creek

=== Protected area ===
- West Bay Wildlife Management Area

=== Climate ===
Allen Parish, Louisiana

Climate chart (precipitation, max. and min. temperature)
J	F	M	A	M	J	J	A	S	O	N	D
6.4 59 39	4.7 63 43	4.1 70 50	5.1 77 56	5.1 83 64	5.8 89 70	5.6 90 72	5.1 91 72	5.1 87 67	4.6 79 57	4.8 69 47	5.5 61 42
- █ Average max. and min. temperatures in °F
- █ Precipitation totals in inches
- Source: National Weather Service
Metric conversion
J	F	M	A	M	J	J	A	S	O	N	D
163 15 4	118 17 6	104 21 10	130 25 13	130 29 18	146 31 21	141 32 22	129 33 22	129 31 19	116 26 14	122 20 8	140 16 5
- █ Average max. and min. temperatures in °C
- █ Precipitation totals in mm

=== Adjacent parishes ===
- Rapides Parish (northeast)
- Vernon Parish (northwest)
- Evangeline Parish (east)
- Jefferson Davis Parish (south)
- Beauregard Parish (west)

== Demographics ==
Historical population
Census	Pop.	Note	%±
1920	18,382		—
1930	15,261		−17.0%
1940	17,540		14.9%
1950	18,835		7.4%
1960	19,867		5.5%
1970	20,794		4.7%
1980	21,390		2.9%
1990	21,226		−0.8%
2000	25,440		19.9%
2010	25,764		1.3%
2020	22,750		−11.7%
2025 (est.)	22,672	▼	−0.3%
U.S. Decennial Census; 1790-1960 1900-1990; 1990-2000 2010

=== 2020 census ===
As of the 2020 census, the parish had a population of 22,750, with 7,851 households and 5,566 families, and the median age was 39.6 years.

23.0% of residents were under the age of 18 and 15.6% were 65 years of age or older. For every 100 females there were 121.2 males, and for every 100 females age 18 and over there were 125.8 males age 18 and over.

There were 9,484 housing units, of which 17.2% were vacant. Among occupied housing units, 73.1% were owner-occupied and 26.9% were renter-occupied. The homeowner vacancy rate was 1.5% and the rental vacancy rate was 10.6%.

29.5% of residents lived in urban areas, while 70.5% lived in rural areas.

=== Racial and ethnic composition ===
Allen Parish, Louisiana – Racial and ethnic composition Note: the US Census treats Hispanic/Latino as an ethnic category. This table excludes Latinos from the racial categories and assigns them to a separate category. Hispanics/Latinos may be of any race.
Race / Ethnicity (NH = Non-Hispanic)	Pop 1980	Pop 1990	Pop 2000	Pop 2010	Pop 2020	% 1980	% 1990	% 2000	% 2010	% 2020
White alone (NH)	16,618	15,824	17,329	18,276	15,146	77.69%	74.55%	68.12%	70.94%	66.58%
Black or African American alone (NH)	4,308	4,402	6,175	5,957	4,016	20.14%	20.74%	24.27%	23.12%	17.65%
Native American or Alaska Native alone (NH)	234	284	436	603	525	1.09%	1.34%	1.71%	2.34%	2.31%
Asian alone (NH)	20	38	142	176	183	0.09%	0.18%	0.56%	0.68%	0.80%
Native Hawaiian or Pacific Islander alone (NH)	x	x	3	5	7	x	x	0.01%	0.02%	0.03%
Other race alone (NH)	12	7	9	31	61	0.06%	0.03%	0.04%	0.12%	0.27%
Mixed race or Multiracial (NH)	x	x	200	374	919	x	x	0.79%	1.45%	4.04%
Hispanic or Latino (any race)	198	671	1,146	342	1,893	0.93%	3.16%	4.50%	1.33%	8.32%
Total	21,390	21,226	25,440	25,764	22,750	100.00%	100.00%	100.00%	100.00%	100.00%

=== 2000 census ===
As of the census of 2000, there were 25,440 people, 8,102 households, and 5,930 families residing in the parish. The population density was 33 people per square mile (13 people/km^{2}). There were 9,157 housing units at an average density of 12 per square mile (4.6/km^{2}). The racial makeup of the parish was 71.90% White, 24.60% Black or African American, 1.72% Native American, 0.57% Asian, 0.01% Pacific Islander, 0.24% from other races, and 0.96% from two or more races. 4.50% of the population were Hispanic or Latino of any race. 6.22% reported speaking French or Cajun French at home, while 4.68% speak Spanish.

There were 8,102 households, out of which 36.90% had children under the age of 18 living with them, 54.00% were married couples living together, 15.20% had a female householder with no husband present, and 26.80% were non-families. 24.30% of all households were made up of individuals, and 11.10% had someone living alone who was 65 years of age or older. The average household size was 2.62 and the average family size was 3.12.

In the parish the population was spread out, with 24.60% under the age of 18, 9.30% from 18 to 24, 33.40% from 25 to 44, 20.80% from 45 to 64, and 11.80% who were 65 years of age or older. The median age was 35 years. For every 100 females there were 126.40 males. For every 100 females age 18 and over, there were 133.50 males.

The median income for a household in the parish was $27,777, and the median income for a family was $33,920. Males had a median income of $32,371 versus $17,154 for females. The per capita income for the parish was $13,101. About 17.90% of families and 19.90% of the population were below the poverty line, including 22.60% of those under age 18 and 21.50% of those age 65 or over.

The most populated city as of the 2000 census was Oakdale, LA.

== Economy ==
Allen Parish had 303 employer establishments in 2021, with a total employment of 3,513. Allen Parish's gross domestic product in 2022 was $898,617.

Lumber production is a strong industry in the parish, particularly in the area of Oakdale.

The Coushatta Casino Resort, owned and operated by the Coushatta Tribe of Louisiana, is located in Kinder and employs about 2,600 people.

According to the Kinder Chamber of Commerce, "the gaming and hospitality industries, along with a plywood manufacturing facility, three prison facilities and a natural gas relay facility are the major private sector employers in the parish." The primary crops are rice and soybeans.

Allen Parish is home to the Allen Parish Public Safety Complex, which has hosted ICE detainees since 2016. In 2018, a dedicated ICE facility was added to the complex. In a 2025 contract, the facility charged the federal government $347,000 to operate on a yearly basis, plus $21.95 per detainee per day, increasing to $19.75 when there are over 170 detainees. Allen Parish Public Safety Complex has the longest average detention time of any detention center in Louisiana, and has been the subject of detainee mistreatment allegations since 2021.

== Arts and culture ==
The Coushatta Tribe of Louisiana's territory is bounded within Allen and Jefferson Davis parishes, and the tribe maintains traditional creative expressions such as music, dance, and fiber arts. An annual powwow celebrating these arts takes place at the Coushatta Casino Resort near Kinder.

Allen Parish is the origin of several notable musicians: blues singer Roy Brown, and zydeco musicians Preston Frank and his son Keith Frank.

The Allen Parish Tourism Commission operates the Allen Parish Cultural Center near Kinder.

On September 27, 2008, the Allen Parish Tourist Commission opened Leatherwood Museum in Oakdale in a two-story house which served during the early 20th century as a hospital where women waited on the second-floor balcony to deliver their babies. The museum focuses on the history of agriculture and timber.

== Politics ==
Allen was a strongly Democratic parish in Presidential and Congressional elections; the last Republican to win a majority in the parish before 2000 was Richard Nixon in 1972. Starting in 2000, when George W. Bush narrowly won the parish, Allen has become a Republican stronghold; John McCain won nearly two-thirds of the parish's vote in 2008.

Allen is part of Louisiana's 4th congressional district, held by Republican Mike Johnson. In the Louisiana House of Representatives Allen is part of the 32nd district, held by Republican R. DeWitt Carrier. In the Louisiana Senate Allen is part of the 28th district, held by Republican Heather Cloud.

United States presidential election results for Allen Parish, Louisiana
Year	Republican		Democratic		Third party(ies)	
Year	No.	%	No.	%	No.	%
1916	81	10.24%	708	89.51%	2	0.25%
1920	242	19.36%	1,008	80.64%	0	0.00%
1924	410	28.83%	1,012	71.17%	0	0.00%
1928	725	35.66%	1,308	64.34%	0	0.00%
1932	130	5.89%	2,075	93.93%	4	0.18%
1936	324	12.80%	2,207	87.20%	0	0.00%
1940	277	9.65%	2,592	90.35%	0	0.00%
1944	336	13.22%	2,205	86.78%	0	0.00%
1948	241	7.49%	1,996	62.01%	982	30.51%
1952	1,461	28.02%	3,754	71.98%	0	0.00%
1956	2,469	50.46%	2,284	46.68%	140	2.86%
1960	1,676	26.97%	3,719	59.84%	820	13.19%
1964	2,704	41.66%	3,787	58.34%	0	0.00%
1968	1,004	13.83%	2,026	27.91%	4,229	58.26%
1972	3,581	59.41%	2,029	33.66%	418	6.93%
1976	2,080	27.11%	5,373	70.02%	220	2.87%
1980	3,328	34.80%	6,057	63.33%	179	1.87%
1984	4,474	47.69%	4,842	51.61%	66	0.70%
1988	3,674	40.87%	5,204	57.89%	111	1.23%
1992	3,069	30.64%	5,626	56.16%	1,322	13.20%
1996	2,589	29.27%	4,930	55.74%	1,325	14.98%
2000	4,035	48.66%	3,914	47.20%	343	4.14%
2004	5,140	56.33%	3,791	41.55%	193	2.12%
2008	6,333	66.90%	2,891	30.54%	243	2.57%
2012	6,495	69.79%	2,617	28.12%	195	2.10%
2016	6,867	74.28%	2,106	22.78%	272	2.94%
2020	7,574	77.21%	2,108	21.49%	128	1.30%
2024	7,003	80.03%	1,661	18.98%	87	0.99%

== Education ==
Residents are zoned to Allen Parish Schools

There is a private school, Oberlin Covenant School, in Oberlin. As of 1992 it was the parish's sole private school.

It is in the service area of Sowela Technical Community College.

== Media ==
Allen Parish's newspapers are The Oakdale Journal and The Kinder Courier News, owned by Louisiana State Newspapers, Inc.

Allen Parish is home to one FM radio station, KKST-FM, an urban contemporary station in Oakdale. Oakdale listeners receive signals from Alexandria and Lafayette stations, while those in Kinder tend to receive from Lafayette and Lake Charles.

For television, Oakdale is served by Alexandria stations KATC (ABC and CW), and KALB (NBC, CBS, and CW). Kinder and Oberlin primarily receive Lake Charles station KPLC (NBC and CW).

== Transportation ==
Transportation in Allen Parish relies on highways and parish roads. The nearest long-distance bus stations are in Alexandria, Opelousas, Lafayette, and Lake Charles.

US 165 runs North–South. The other major highways, which are US 190, LA 10, and LA 26, run East–West.

=== Major highways ===
- U.S. Highway 165
- U.S. Highway 190
- Louisiana Highway 10
- Louisiana Highway 26
- Louisiana Highway 104
- Louisiana Highway 112
- Louisiana Highway 113
- Louisiana Highway 372
- Louisiana Highway 377
- Louisiana Highway 383
- Louisiana Highway 1150
- Louisiana Highway 1151
- Louisiana Highway 1152
- Louisiana Highway 1153
- Louisiana Highway 1156
- Louisiana Highway 3205
- Louisiana Highway 3206

== National Guard ==
Detachment 1, B Company 3-156TH Infantry Battalion of the 256TH IBCT resided in Oakdale, Louisiana. This unit deployed twice to Iraq in 2004-5 and 2010. Armory was closed, elements moved to Camp Beauregard.

== Communities ==
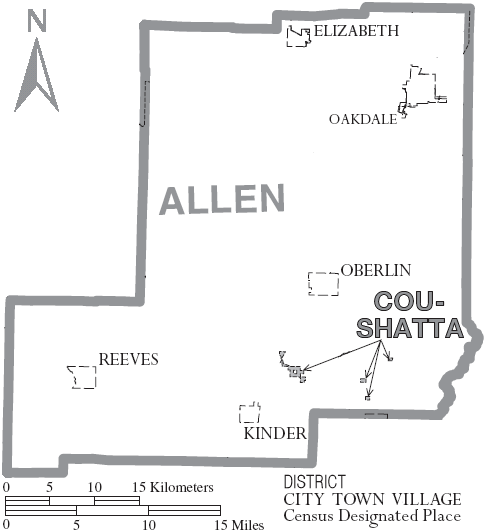
Map of Allen Parish, Louisiana With Municipal Labels

=== City ===
- Oakdale (largest municipality)

=== Towns ===
- Kinder
- Oberlin (parish seat)

=== Village ===
- Elizabeth
- Reeves

=== Unincorporated communities ===
- Bond
- Canton
- Cherry Grove
- Elder
- Grant
- Lauderdale
- LeBlanc
- Mittie
- Soileau

== Notable people ==
- Roy Brown (1925–1981), R&B singer, songwriter, and musician
- William J. "Bill" Dodd (1909–1991), Louisiana lieutenant governor from 1948 to 1952 and Louisiana state representative from 1940 to 1948
- Faye Emerson (1917–1983), film and stage actress and television interviewer
- Beau Jocque (1953–1999), Louisiana French Creole zydeco musician and songwriter
- Herb Metoyer (1935–2015), singer, songwriter, novelist and former U.S. Army officer
- J.B. Fuselier (1901–1976), Cajun musician
- John McNeese (1843–1914), first superintendent of schools of Imperial Calcasieu Parish and namesake of McNeese State University
- Douglas B. Fournet (1943–1968), posthumous recipient of the Medal of Honor during the Vietnam War
- Joe N. Ballard (born 1942), former U.S. Army lieutenant general and first African-American to serve as Chief of Engineers
- Cloves Campbell Sr. (1931–2004), politician and newspaper operator; first African-American to serve as a member of the Arizona Senate
- Preston Frank (born 1947), zydeco accordionist and band leader
- Keith Frank (born 1972), zydeco accordionist and band leader
- Hoyle Granger (born 1944), former American football player in the NFL. Member of the Mississippi Sports Hall of Fame and Louisiana Sports Hall of Fame
- Gilbert Franklin Hennigan (1883–1960), Louisiana state senator from 1944 to 1956.
- Ollie Shepard (1909–1960), blues pianist, vocalist, and songwriter
- Dorothy Sue Hill (born 1939), rancher and retired educator. Former Louisiana state representative for the 32nd District.
- Leroy Johnson (1919–1944), posthumous recipient of the Medal of Honor during World War II
- E. Holman Jones (1926–2014), United States Navy veteran of World War II and Louisiana state representative from 1968 to 1972
- Coleman Lindsey (1892–1968), Louisiana state senator from 1924 to 1928 and 1932–1939. Lieutenant Governor of Louisiana from 1939 to 1940
- Mary Evelyn Parker (1920–2015), first female Treasurer of Louisiana from 1968 to 1987
- R.C. Slocum (born 1944), former head football coach at Texas A&M
- Blake Trahan (born 1993), former professional baseball shortstop with the Cincinnati Reds

== See also ==
- National Register of Historic Places listings in Allen Parish, Louisiana
