= Blake Trahan =

American baseball player (born 1993)

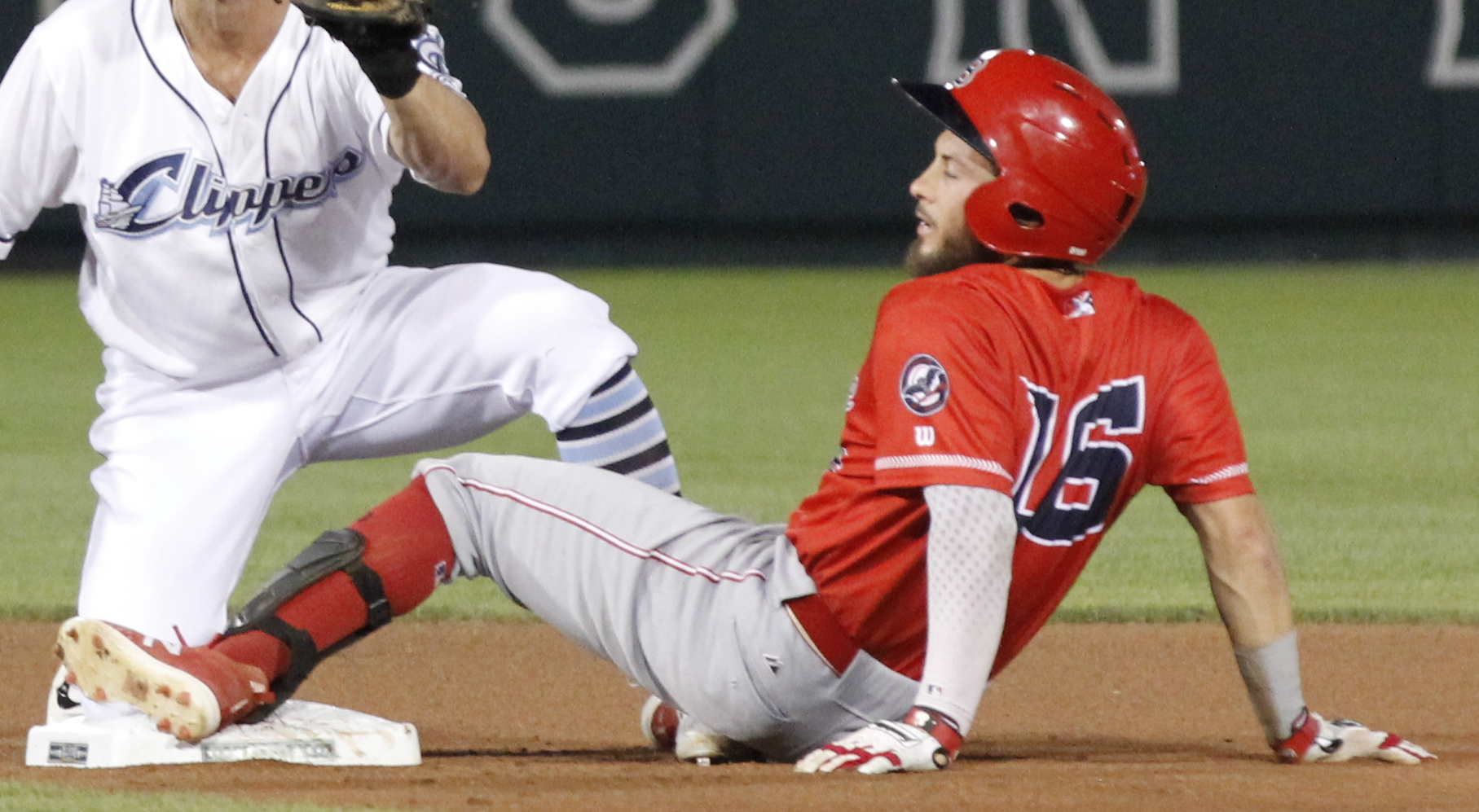
- Trahan with the Louisville Bats in 2018
- Shortstop
- Born: September 5, 1993 (age 32); Lake Charles, Louisiana, U.S.
- Batted: Right Threw: Right

MLB debut
- September 3, 2018, for the Cincinnati Reds

Last MLB appearance
- September 30, 2018, for the Cincinnati Reds

MLB statistics
- Batting average: .214
- Home runs: 0
- Runs batted in: 0
- Stats at Baseball Reference

Teams
- Cincinnati Reds (2018)

Blake Matthew Trahan (born September 5, 1993) is an American former professional baseball shortstop. He played in Major League Baseball (MLB) for the Cincinnati Reds in 2018.

== Amateur career ==
Trahan attended Kinder High School in Kinder, Louisiana. He enrolled at the University of Louisiana at Lafayette to play college baseball for the Louisiana-Lafayette Ragin' Cajuns baseball team. In 2015, Trahan was named the Sun Belt Conference Baseball Player of the Year.

== Professional career ==
Considered a potential first round draft pick in the 2015 MLB draft, the Cincinnati Reds selected Trahan in the third round, with the 84th overall selection. Trahan signed with the Reds, receiving a $708,900 signing bonus, and began his professional career with the Billings Mustangs of the Rookie-level Pioneer League. After posting a .312 batting average with a .803 OPS, he was promoted to the Daytona Tortugas of the High-A Florida State League to end the season, where he struggled, batting .139 in 11 games. In 2016, Trahan returned to Daytona, where he posted a .263 batting average, along with four home runs, 47 RBI, and 25 stolen bases.

Trahan played for the Pensacola Blue Wahoos of the Double-A Southern League in 2017 where he batted .222 with two home runs and 27 RBI in 136 games. In 2018, he played for the Louisville Bats of the Triple-A International League. On September 1, 2018, Trahan was selected to the 40-man roster and promoted to the major leagues for the first time. He made 11 appearances for Cincinnati during his rookie campaign, going 3-for-14 (.214). After the season, Trahan won the Minor League Baseball Rawlings Gold Glove Award.

Trahan began the 2019 season with Louisville. On August 5, 2019, Trahan was designated for assignment by Cincinnati following the promotion of Brian O'Grady. He cleared waivers and was sent outright to Triple-A Louisville on August 8.

Trahan participated in 2020 spring training with the Reds, which was canceled due to the COVID-19 pandemic. Upon the resumption of the MLB season in July, Trahan was invited to return to the team on June 28, but opted to retire from baseball.
