= Oakdale, Louisiana =

Oakdale
- City
- City of Oakdale
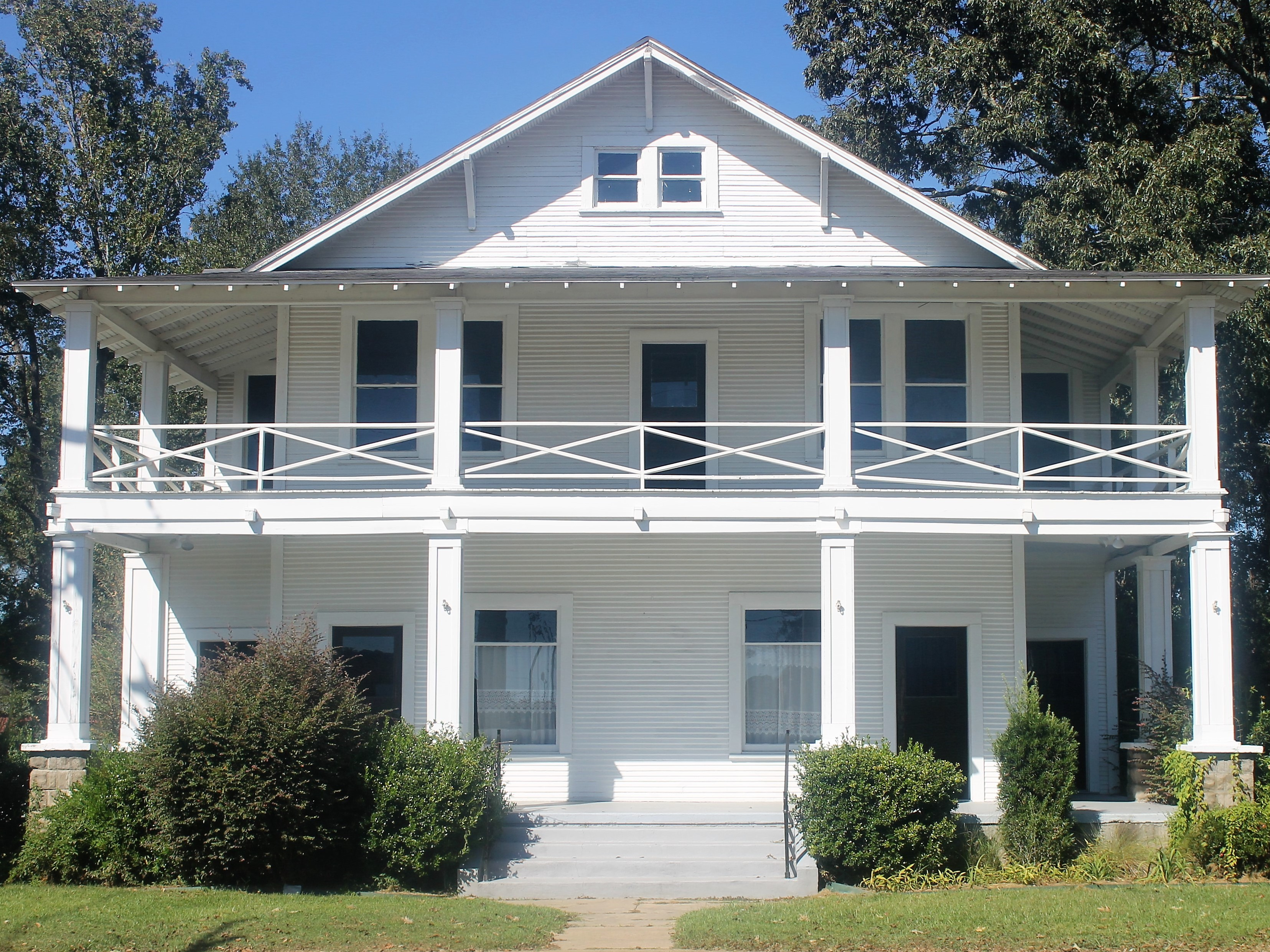
- The Leatherwood Museum in Oakdale is the site of the Allen Parish Tourist Commission.

- Location of Oakdale in Allen Parish, Louisiana.

- Location within Louisiana Location within the United States
- Coordinates: 30°48′38″N 92°38′22″W
- Country: United States
- State: Louisiana
- Parish: Allen

Area
  - Total: 5.25 sq mi (13.61 km^{2})
  - Land: 5.19 sq mi (13.45 km^{2})
  - Water: 0.062 sq mi (0.16 km^{2})
- Elevation: 118 ft (36 m)

Population (2020)
  - Total: 6,692
  - Density: 1,288.9/sq mi (497.64/km^{2})
- Time zone: UTC-6 (CST)
  - Summer (DST): UTC-5 (CDT)
- ZIP code: 71463
- Area code: 318
- FIPS code: 22-56540
- GNIS feature ID: 2404410
- Website: www.cityofoakdalela.org

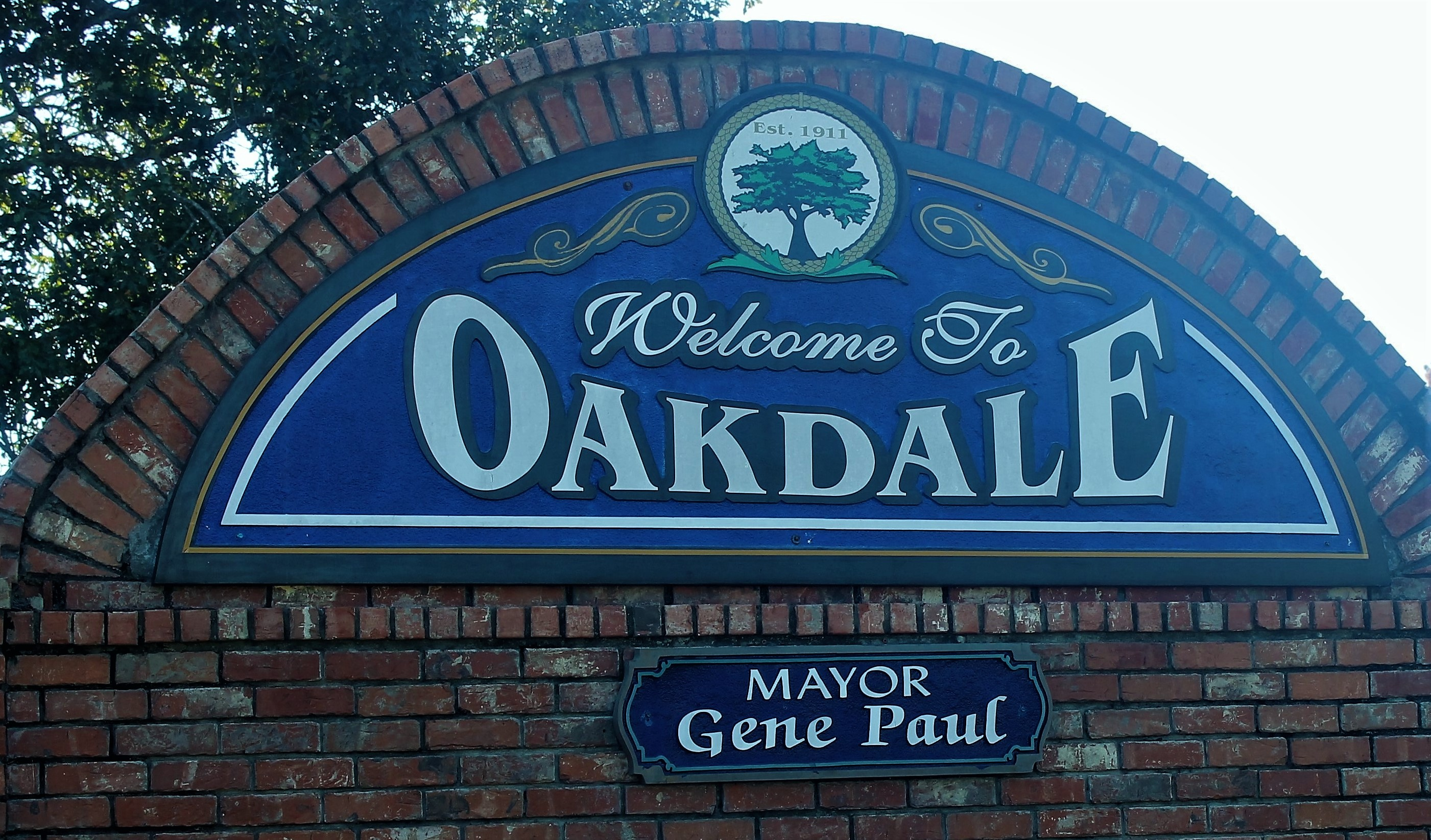
Oakdale welcome sign

Oakdale is a city in Allen Parish in south Louisiana, United States. As of the 2020 census, Oakdale had a population of 6,692.

Oakdale was founded as "Dunnsville" by William T. Dunn. The history of Allen Parish is preserved at the Leatherwood Museum, which reopened on September 27, 2008, in a renovated facility at 202 E. 7th Ave. in Oakdale.

== Geography ==
According to the United States Census Bureau, the city has a total area of 5.3 square miles (13.6 km^{2}), of which 5.2 square miles (13.4 km^{2}) is land and 0.077 square miles (0.2 km^{2}), or 1.18%, is water. Oakdale's closest neighbor in Allen Parish is Elizabeth, located just west of Oakdale.

== Demographics ==
Historical population
| Census | Pop. | Note | %± |
|---|---|---|---|
| 1920 | 4,016 | | — |
| 1930 | 3,188 | | −20.6% |
| 1940 | 3,933 | | 23.4% |
| 1950 | 5,598 | | 42.3% |
| 1960 | 6,618 | | 18.2% |
| 1970 | 7,301 | | 10.3% |
| 1980 | 7,155 | | −2.0% |
| 1990 | 6,832 | | −4.5% |
| 2000 | 8,137 | | 19.1% |
| 2010 | 7,780 | | −4.4% |
| 2020 | 6,692 | | −14.0% |
| 2025 (est.) | 6,526 | ▼ | −2.5% |
U.S. Decennial Census

=== Racial and ethnic composition ===
Oakdale city, Louisiana – Racial and ethnic composition Note: the US Census treats Hispanic/Latino as an ethnic category. This table excludes Latinos from the racial categories and assigns them to a separate category. Hispanics/Latinos may be of any race.
| Race / Ethnicity (NH = Non-Hispanic) | Pop 2000 | Pop 2010 | Pop 2020 | % 2000 | % 2010 | % 2020 |
|---|---|---|---|---|---|---|
| White alone (NH) | 4,168 | 4,831 | 3,197 | 51.22% | 62.10% | 47.77% |
| Black or African American alone (NH) | 2,769 | 2,640 | 2,117 | 34.03% | 33.93% | 31.63% |
| Native American or Alaska Native alone (NH) | 46 | 94 | 71 | 0.57% | 1.21% | 1.06% |
| Asian alone (NH) | 98 | 60 | 66 | 1.20% | 0.77% | 0.99% |
| Native Hawaiian or Pacific Islander alone (NH) | 1 | 1 | 2 | 0.01% | 0.01% | 0.03% |
| Other race alone (NH) | 0 | 7 | 27 | 0.00% | 0.09% | 0.40% |
| Mixed race or Multiracial (NH) | 61 | 84 | 262 | 0.75% | 1.08% | 3.92% |
| Hispanic or Latino (any race) | 994 | 63 | 950 | 12.22% | 0.81% | 14.20% |
| Total | 8,137 | 7,780 | 6,692 | 100.00% | 100.00% | 100.00% |

=== 2020 census ===
As of the 2020 United States census, there were 6,692 people, 2,112 households, and 1,418 families residing in the city.

=== 2000 census ===
As of the census of 2000, there were 8,137 people, 2,246 households, and 1,525 families residing in the city. The population density was 1,603.6 inhabitants per square mile (619.2/km^{2}). There were 2,512 housing units at an average density of 495.1 per square mile (191.2/km^{2}). The racial makeup of the city was 62.07% White, 34.94% African American, 0.57% Native American, 1.23% Asian, 0.01% Pacific Islander, 0.33% from other races, and 0.85% from two or more races. Hispanic or Latino of any race were 12.22% of the population.

There were 2,246 households, out of which 34.5% had children under the age of 18 living with them, 40.6% were married couples living together, 23.0% had a female householder with no husband present, and 32.1% were non-families. 29.0% of all households were made up of individuals, and 13.7% had someone living alone who was 65 years of age or older. The average household size was 2.54 and the average family size was 3.13.

In the city, the population was spread out, with 21.2% under the age of 18, 10.3% from 18 to 24, 38.6% from 25 to 44, 18.3% from 45 to 64, and 11.6% who were 65 years of age or older. The median age was 34 years. For every 100 females, there were 157.4 males. For every 100 females age 18 and over, there were 179.2 males.

The median income for a household in the city was $22,826, and the median income for a family was $28,506. Males had a median income of $32,179 versus $16,039 for females. The per capita income for the city was $10,288. About 21.7% of families and 23.4% of the population were below the poverty line, including 25.1% of those under age 18 and 22.9% of those age 65 or over.

== Notable people ==
- Bill Dodd, former lieutenant governor of Louisiana
- Leroy Johnson, posthumous recipient of the Medal of Honor
- Coleman Lindsey, former lieutenant governor of Louisiana
- Mary Evelyn Parker, former Louisiana State Treasurer
- R.C. Slocum, former head football coach at Texas A&M

== Education ==
Allen Parish School Board operates public schools:

- Oakdale High School
- Oakdale Middle School
- Oakdale Elementary School

== Notable facilities ==
Oakdale is home to the Oakdale Federal Correctional Complex.

In April 2009, the Roy O. Martin Lumber Company, doing business as Martco, unveiled a $200 million oriented-strand-board plant near Oakdale. The largest plant of its kind in the world, the facility initially employed 170 persons, according to company president Roy O. Martin, III.

== Gallery ==
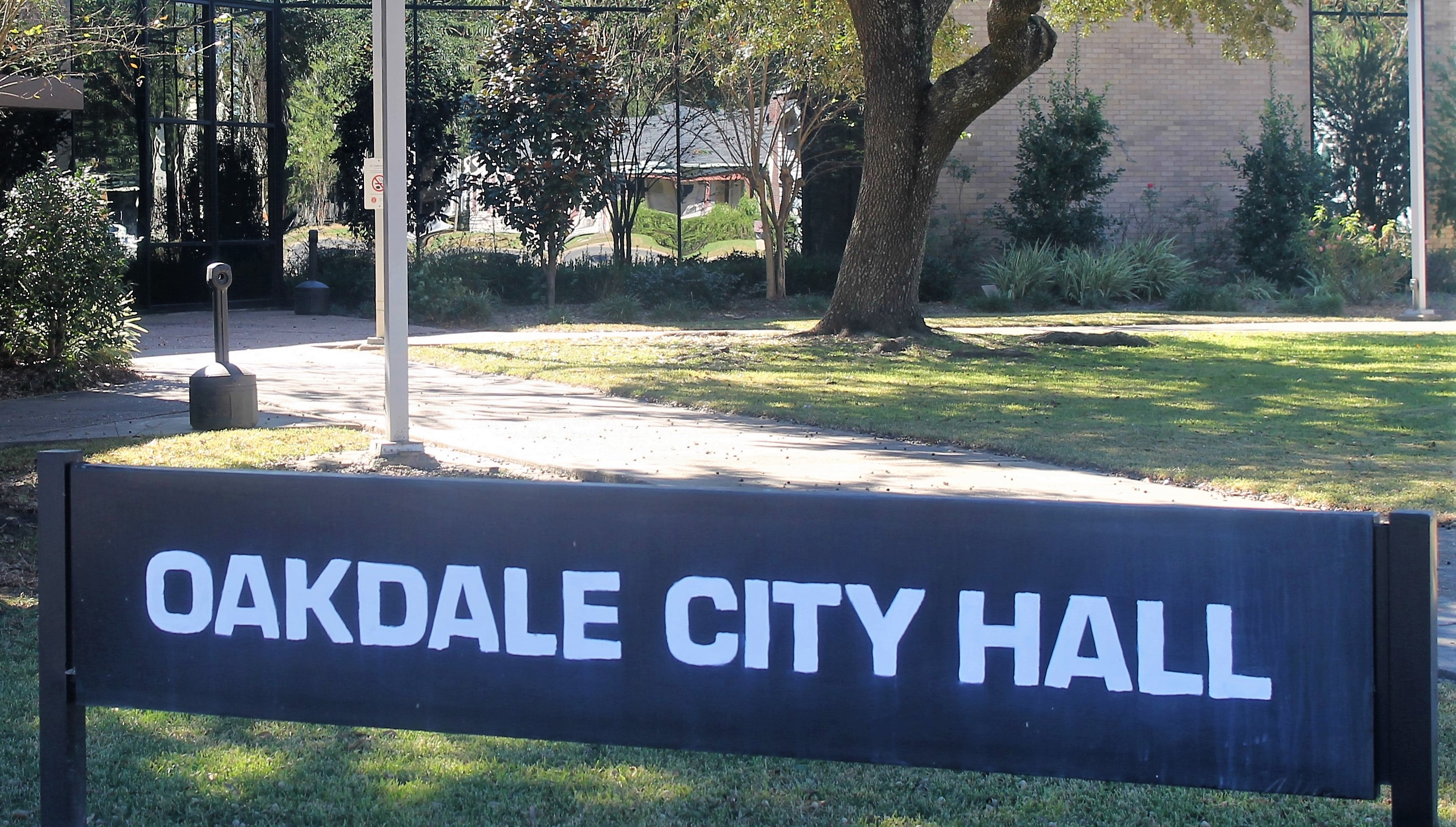
Entrance to Oakdale City Hall at 333 E. 6th Ave.

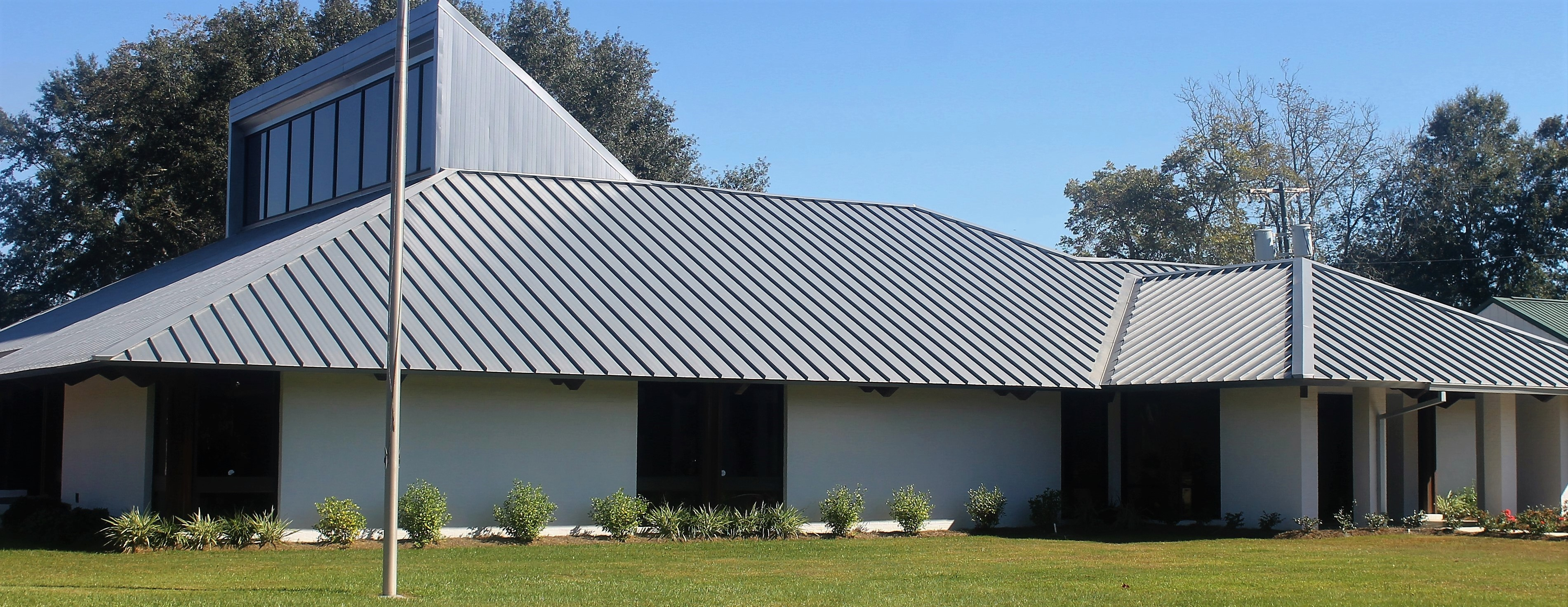
Oakdale branch of the Allen Parish Library at 405 E 6th Ave.

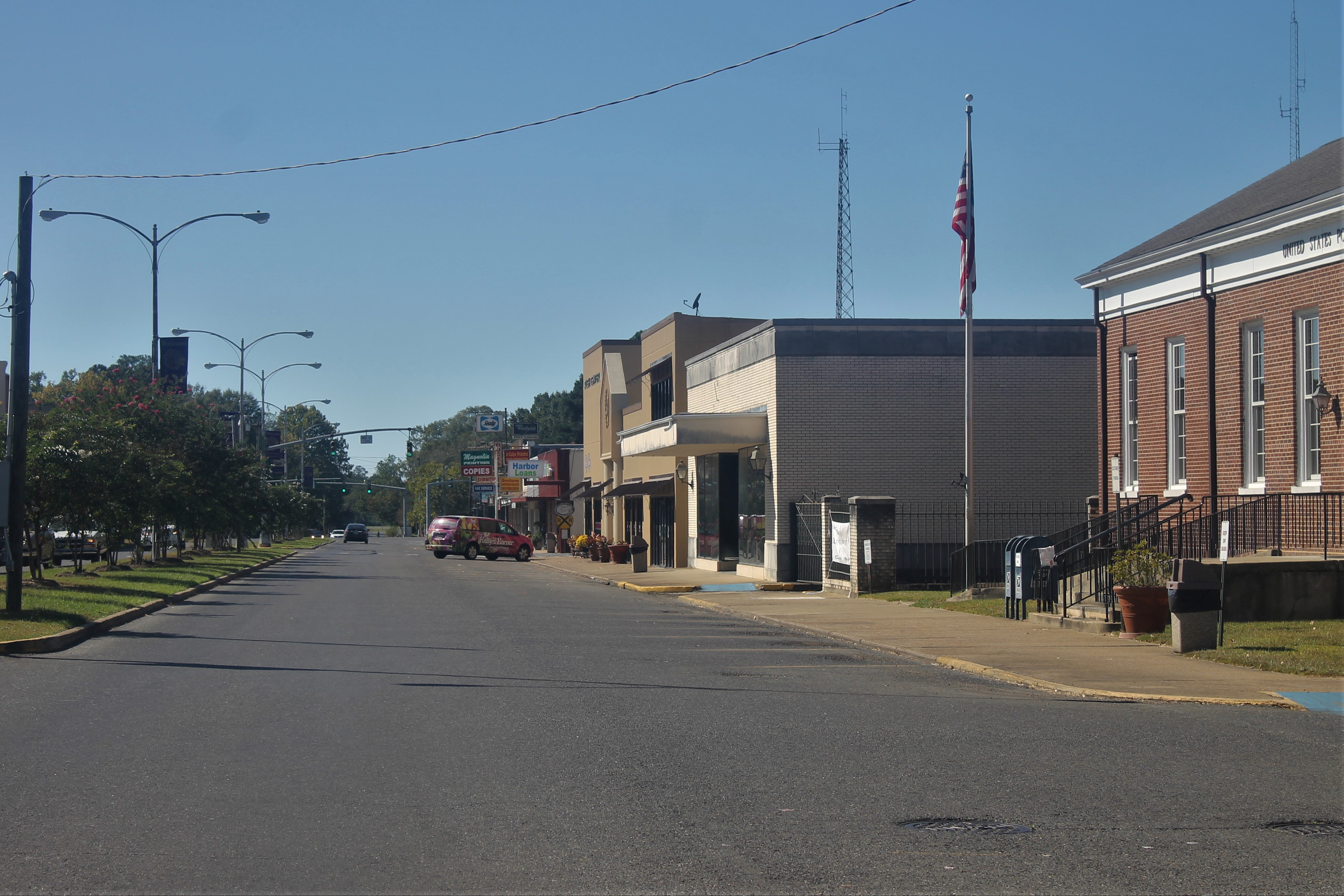
Downtown Oakdale, with the United States Post Office at the front right

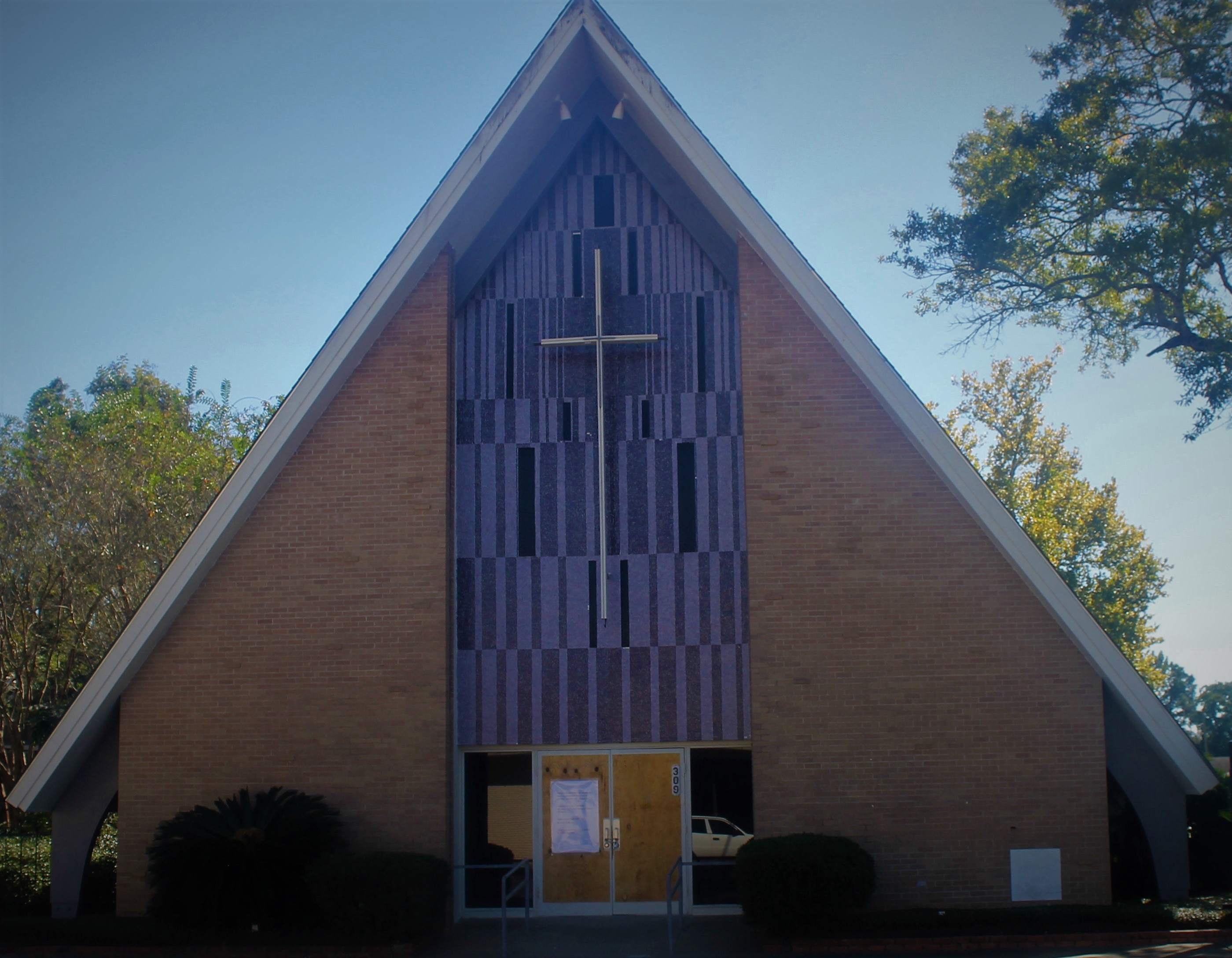
First United Methodist Church at 309 E 6th Ave. in Oakdale

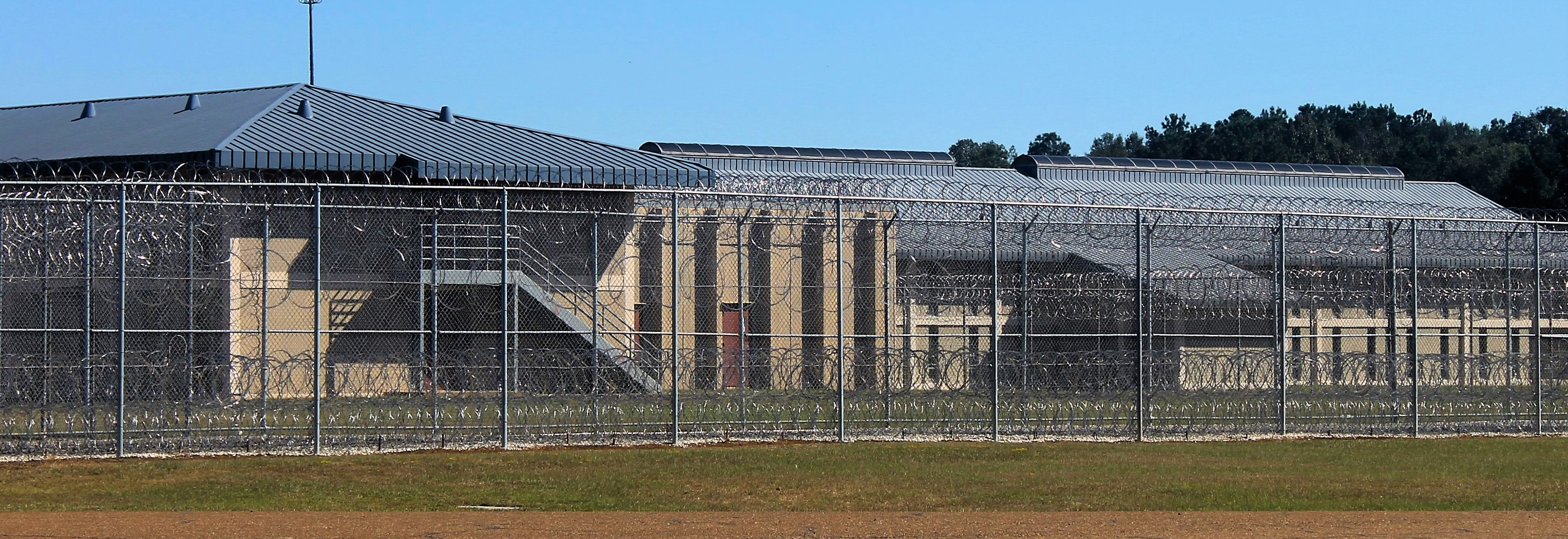
Behind the barricades at the Federal Correctional Institution, Oakdale
