= Oberlin, Louisiana =

Town in the United States

- Town
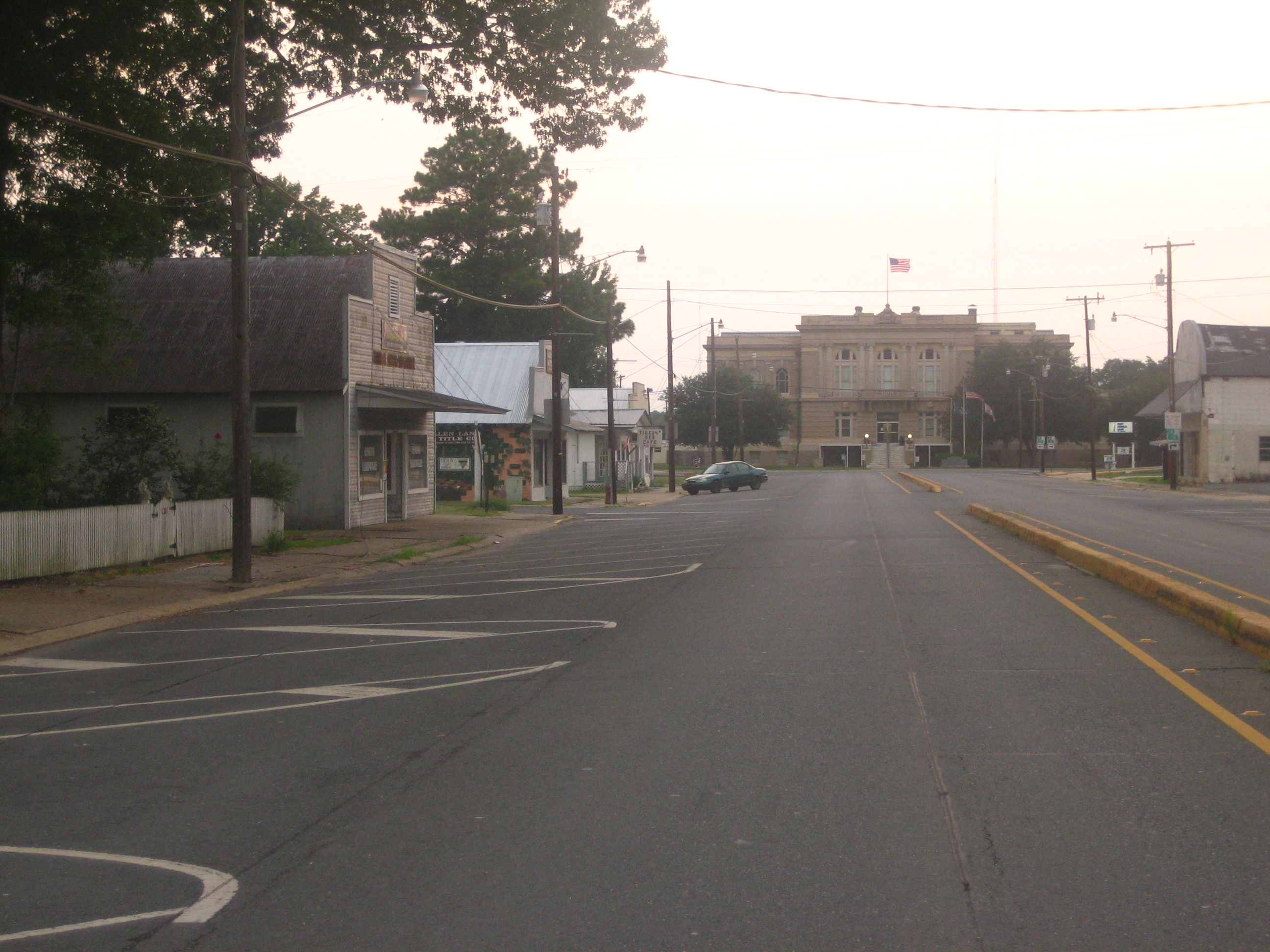
- Downtown Oberlin with the Allen Parish Courthouse in the background

- Location of Oberlin in Allen Parish, Louisiana.

- Location of Louisiana in the United States
- Coordinates: 30°37′10″N 92°45′50″W
- Country: United States
- State: Louisiana
- Parish: Allen

Area
  - Total: 4.38 sq mi (11.35 km^{2})
  - Land: 4.38 sq mi (11.35 km^{2})
  - Water: 0.0039 sq mi (0.01 km^{2})
- Elevation: 66 ft (20 m)

Population (2020)
  - Total: 1,402
  - Density: 320.0/sq mi (123.55/km^{2})
- Time zone: UTC-6 (CST)
  - Summer (DST): UTC-5 (CDT)
- ZIP Code: 70655
- Area code: 337
- FIPS code: 22-57450
- GNIS feature ID: 2407029
- Website: oberlin.municipalimpact.com

Oberlin is a town in and the parish seat of Allen Parish, Louisiana, United States. As of the 2020 census, Oberlin had a population of 1,402. The town is named after Johann Friedrich Oberlin.

Oberlin was the home of Ernest S. Clements, a Democratic member of the Louisiana State Senate and, later, the Louisiana Public Service Commission. He ran unsuccessfully in 1944 for governor of Louisiana.

== Geography ==
According to the United States Census Bureau, the town has a total area of 4.4 square miles (11.4 km^{2}), all land. Oberlin is located on U.S. Route 165 at LA 26.

=== Climate ===
Oberlin has a humid subtropical climate (Köppen: Cfa) with long, hot summers and short, mild winters.

Climate data for Oberlin, Louisiana (1991–2020 normals, extremes 1953–present)
Month	Jan	Feb	Mar	Apr	May	Jun	Jul	Aug	Sep	Oct	Nov	Dec	Year
Record high °F (°C)	82 (28)	85 (29)	89 (32)	93 (34)	99 (37)	102 (39)	102 (39)	106 (41)	108 (42)	96 (36)	90 (32)	83 (28)	108 (42)
Mean maximum °F (°C)	75.4 (24.1)	77.9 (25.5)	82.4 (28.0)	86.4 (30.2)	91.3 (32.9)	94.8 (34.9)	96.5 (35.8)	97.3 (36.3)	94.8 (34.9)	89.2 (31.8)	83.0 (28.3)	77.6 (25.3)	98.3 (36.8)
Mean daily maximum °F (°C)	59.2 (15.1)	63.4 (17.4)	70.2 (21.2)	76.7 (24.8)	83.3 (28.5)	88.5 (31.4)	90.3 (32.4)	91.1 (32.8)	86.9 (30.5)	78.6 (25.9)	68.6 (20.3)	61.3 (16.3)	76.5 (24.7)
Daily mean °F (°C)	49.2 (9.6)	53.3 (11.8)	60.0 (15.6)	66.3 (19.1)	73.5 (23.1)	79.1 (26.2)	81.1 (27.3)	81.3 (27.4)	76.9 (24.9)	67.6 (19.8)	57.8 (14.3)	51.4 (10.8)	66.5 (19.2)
Mean daily minimum °F (°C)	39.2 (4.0)	43.3 (6.3)	49.7 (9.8)	56.0 (13.3)	63.7 (17.6)	69.8 (21.0)	71.9 (22.2)	71.5 (21.9)	66.9 (19.4)	56.5 (13.6)	47.1 (8.4)	41.5 (5.3)	56.4 (13.6)
Mean minimum °F (°C)	24.6 (−4.1)	28.9 (−1.7)	33.2 (0.7)	40.3 (4.6)	50.8 (10.4)	62.7 (17.1)	67.6 (19.8)	66.5 (19.2)	55.0 (12.8)	40.7 (4.8)	31.5 (−0.3)	27.8 (−2.3)	23.2 (−4.9)
Record low °F (°C)	9 (−13)	16 (−9)	21 (−6)	31 (−1)	39 (4)	49 (9)	56 (13)	56 (13)	40 (4)	28 (−2)	20 (−7)	8 (−13)	8 (−13)
Average precipitation inches (mm)	6.42 (163)	4.66 (118)	4.09 (104)	5.10 (130)	5.12 (130)	5.75 (146)	5.57 (141)	5.08 (129)	5.06 (129)	4.58 (116)	4.81 (122)	5.51 (140)	61.75 (1,568)
Average snowfall inches (cm)	0.0 (0.0)	0.0 (0.0)	0.0 (0.0)	0.0 (0.0)	0.0 (0.0)	0.0 (0.0)	0.0 (0.0)	0.0 (0.0)	0.0 (0.0)	0.0 (0.0)	0.0 (0.0)	0.1 (0.25)	0.1 (0.25)
Average precipitation days (≥ 0.01 in)	10.8	9.3	8.3	7.5	7.8	11.1	10.6	10.3	8.8	6.9	7.8	10.1	109.3
Average snowy days (≥ 0.1 in)	0.0	0.0	0.0	0.0	0.0	0.0	0.0	0.0	0.0	0.0	0.0	0.1	0.1
Source: NOAA

== Demographics ==
Historical population
Census	Pop.	Note	%±
1900	213		—
1910	232		8.9%
1920	623		168.5%
1930	790		26.8%
1940	962		21.8%
1950	1,544		60.5%
1960	1,794		16.2%
1970	1,857		3.5%
1980	1,764		−5.0%
1990	1,808		2.5%
2000	1,853		2.5%
2010	1,770		−4.5%
2020	1,402		−20.8%
2025 (est.)	1,286	▼	−8.3%
U.S. Decennial Census

=== 2020 census ===
Oberlin racial composition
Race	Number	Percentage
White (non-Hispanic)	700	49.93%
Black or African American (non-Hispanic)	528	37.66%
Native American	17	1.21%
Asian	16	1.14%
Pacific Islander	3	0.21%
Other/Mixed	55	3.92%
Hispanic or Latino	83	5.92%

As of the 2020 United States census, there were 1,402 people, 496 households, and 313 families residing in the town.

=== 2000 census ===
As of the census of 2000, there were 1,853 people, 702 households, and 464 families residing in the town. The population density was 602.0 inhabitants per square mile (232.4/km^{2}). There were 789 housing units at an average density of 256.3 per square mile (99.0/km^{2}).

The racial makeup of the town was 60.28% White, 37.61% African American, 0.76% Native American, 0.27% Asian, 0.16% from other races, and 0.92% from two or more races. Hispanic or Latino of any race were 0.70% of the population.

There were 702 households, out of which 34.5% had children under the age of 18 living with them, 45.0% were married couples living together, 17.7% had a female householder with no husband present, and 33.8% were non-families. 31.3% of all households were made up of individuals, and 13.0% had someone living alone who was 65 years of age or older. The average household size was 2.43 and the average family size was 3.06.

In the town, the population was spread out, with 26.4% under the age of 18, 8.0% from 18 to 24, 25.1% from 25 to 44, 24.5% from 45 to 64, and 16.0% who were 65 years of age or older. The median age was 38 years. For every 100 females, there were 90.1 males. For every 100 females age 18 and over, there were 83.8 males.

The median income for a household in the town was $23,333, and the median income for a family was $30,583. Males had a median income of $28,558 versus $16,923 for females. The per capita income for the town was $12,050. About 18.3% of families and 25.5% of the population were below the poverty line, including 30.3% of those under age 18 and 31.1% of those age 65 or over.

== Education ==
Allen Parish School Board operates Oberlin High School and Oberlin Elementary School in Oberlin.

There is a private school, Oberlin Covenant School, which opened circa 1986. In 1992, two people worked to operate the school, and there were five teachers who worked full time. That year, its enrollment was 40, and there were six students per teacher, a ratio lower than those of public schools.

== Notable people ==
- Hoyle Granger- former AFL and NFL player
