= List of high schools in Louisiana =

This is a list of high schools in the state of Louisiana.

== Acadia Parish ==
- Church Point High School, Church Point
- Iota High School, Iota
- Midland High School, Midland
- Rayne High School, Rayne

=== Crowley ===
- Crowley High School
- Northside Christian School
- Notre Dame High School

== Allen Parish ==
- Elizabeth High School, Elizabeth
- Fairview High School, Grant
- Kinder High School, Kinder
- Oakdale High School, Oakdale
- Oberlin High School, Oberlin
- Reeves High School, Reeves

== Ascension Parish ==
- Dutchtown High School, Geismar
- St. Amant High School, St. Amant

=== Donaldsonville ===
- Ascension Catholic High School
- Donaldsonville High School

=== Gonzales ===
- Ascension Christian High School
- East Ascension High School

== Assumption Parish ==
- Assumption High School, Napoleonville

== Avoyelles Parish ==
- Avoyelles High School, Moreauville
- Avoyelles Public Charter School, Mansura
- Marksville High School, Marksville
- St. Joseph School, Plaucheville

=== Bunkie ===
- Bunkie High School
- Louisiana School for the Agricultural Sciences

== Beauregard Parish ==
- DeRidder High School, DeRidder
- East Beauregard High School, Dry Creek
- Merryville High School, Merryville
- Singer High School, Singer
- South Beauregard High School, Longville

== Bienville Parish ==
- Arcadia High School, Arcadia
- Castor High School, Castor
- Gibsland–Coleman High School, Gibsland
- Ringgold High School, Ringgold
- Saline High School, Saline

== Bossier Parish ==
- Benton High School, Benton
- Haughton High School, Haughton
- Plain Dealing Middle/High School, Plain Dealing

=== Bossier City ===
- Airline High School
- Bossier High School
- Parkway High School

== Caddo Parish ==
- North Caddo High School, Vivian

=== Shreveport ===
==== Public ====
- Booker T. Washington High School
- C. E. Byrd High School
- Caddo Career & Technology Center
- Caddo Magnet High School
- Captain Shreve High School
- Green Oaks High School
- Huntington High School
- Northwood High School
- Southwood High School
- Woodlawn High School

==== Private/Charter ====
- Calvary Baptist Academy
- Evangel Christian Academy
- Kingston Christian Academy
- Loyola College Prep
- Magnolia School of Excellence
- Pathways in Education (Southern Hills & North Market)
- Word of God Academy

== Calcasieu Parish ==
- Bell City High School, Bell City
- DeQuincy High School, DeQuincy
- Iowa High School, Iowa
- Starks High School, Starks
- Vinton High School, Vinton
- Westlake High School, Westlake

=== Lake Charles ===
- A. M. Barbe High School
- Calcasieu Career Center
- Hamilton Christian School
- LaGrange High School
- Lake Charles College Prep
- Lake Charles-Boston Academy of Learning
- Sam Houston High School
- St. Louis Catholic High School
- Washington-Marion Magnet High School

=== Sulphur ===
- Parkview Christian School
- Sulphur High School

== Caldwell Parish ==
- Caldwell Parish High School, Columbia

== Cameron Parish ==
- Grand Lake High School, Grand Lake
- Hackberry High School, Hackberry
- Johnson Bayou High School, Johnson Bayou
- South Cameron High School, Creole

== Catahoula Parish ==
- Harrisonburg High School, Harrisonburg
- Sicily Island High School, Sicily Island

=== Jonesville ===
- Block High School
- Central High School

== Claiborne Parish ==
- Homer High School, Homer
- Summerfield High School, Summerfield

=== Haynesville ===
- Claiborne Academy
- Haynesville Junior/Senior High School

== Concordia Parish ==
- Concordia Parish Academy of Math, Science & Technology Ridgecrest
- Monterey High School, Monterey
- Vidalia High School, Vidalia

=== Ferriday ===
- Delta Charter School
- Ferriday High School

== De Soto Parish ==
- Mansfield High School, Mansfield
- North DeSoto High School, Stonewall

=== Logansport ===
- Logansport High School
- Stanley High School

== East Baton Rouge Parish ==
- Baker High School, Baker
- Northeast High School, Pride
- Zachary High School, Zachary

=== Baton Rouge ===
==== Public ====
- Baton Rouge Magnet High School
- Belaire High School
- Broadmoor High School
- Capitol High School
- GEO Next Generation High School
- Glen Oaks High School
- Istrouma High School
- Liberty Magnet High School
- Louisiana School for the Deaf
- Louisiana School for the Visually Impaired
- McKinley High School
- Northdale Alternative Magnet Academy
- Scotlandville Magnet High School
- Tara High School
- Woodlawn High School

==== Private ====
- The Brighton School
- Catholic High School
- Collegiate Baton Rouge
- The Dunham School
- Episcopal High School
- Family Christian Academy
- Greater Baton Rouge Hope Academy
- Helix Aviation Academy
- Jehovah-Jireh Christian Academy
- Madison Preparatory Academy
- Mentorship Academy of Digital Arts
- Parkview Baptist High School
- St Joseph's Academy
- Southern University Laboratory School
- St. Michael the Archangel High School
- Thrive Academy
- University Lab High School

=== Central ===
- Central High School
- Central Private School

== East Carroll Parish ==
=== Lake Providence ===
- Briarfield Academy
- General Trass High School

== East Feliciana Parish ==
- East Feliciana High School, Jackson
- Silliman Institute, Clinton
- Slaughter Community Charter School, Slaughter

== Evangeline Parish ==
- Basile High School, Basile
- Mamou High School, Mamou
- Pine Prairie High School, Pine Prairie

=== Ville Platte ===
- Sacred Heart High School
- Ville Platte High School

== Franklin Parish ==
=== Winnsboro ===
- Family Community Christian School
- Franklin Academy
- Franklin Parish High School

== Grant Parish ==
- Georgetown High School, Georgetown
- Montgomery High School, Montgomery

=== Dry Prong ===
- Grant Academy
- Grant High School

== Iberia Parish ==
- Delcambre High School, Delcambre
- Jeanerette Senior High School, Jeanerette
- Loreauville High School, Loreauville

=== New Iberia ===
- Catholic High School
- Highland Baptist Christian School
- New Iberia Senior High School
- Westgate High School

== Iberville Parish ==
- North Iberville High School, Rosedale
- White Castle High School, White Castle

=== Plaquemine ===
- Mathematics, Science, and Arts Academy - West
- Plaquemine High School
- St. John High School

=== St. Gabriel ===
- East Iberville High School
- Mathematics, Science, and Arts Academy - East

== Jackson Parish ==
- Jonesboro-Hodge High School, Jonesboro
- Quitman High School, Quitman
- Weston High School, Weston

== Jefferson Parish ==
- Fisher Middle-High School, Jean Lafitte
- Grand Isle School, Grand Isle
- JCFA West Campus, Terrytown
- John Curtis Christian School, River Ridge

=== Gretna ===
- A Different World Academy
- Thomas Jefferson High School
- Muslim Academy

=== Harvey ===
- JCFA Main Campus
- Jefferson RISE Charter School
- West Jefferson High School

=== Jefferson ===
- JCFA East Campus
- Patrick F. Taylor Science and Technology Academy
- Riverdale High School

=== Kenner ===
- Alfred Bonnabel High School
- Kenner Discovery Health Sciences Academy

=== Marrero ===
- Academy of Our Lady
- Archbishop Shaw High School
- Cuillier Career Center
- John Ehret High School
- L. W. Higgins High School

=== Metairie ===
- Archbishop Chapelle High School
- Archbishop Rummel High School
- Crescent City Christian School
- East Jefferson High School
- Ecole Classique School
- Haynes Academy for Advanced Studies
- John Martyn Alternative School
- Lutheran High School of Greater New Orleans
- Metairie Park Country Day School
- St. Martin's Episcopal School
- St. Therese Academy

== Jefferson Davis Parish ==
- Elton High School, Elton
- Hathaway High School, Hathaway
- Jennings High School, Jennings
- Lacassine High School, Lacassine
- Lake Arthur High School, Lake Arthur
- Welsh High School, Welsh

== La Salle Parish ==
- Jena High School, Jena
- LaSalle High School, Olla

== Lafayette Parish ==
=== Lafayette ===
- Acadiana High School
- Ascension Episcopal School
- Carencro High School
- David Thibodaux STEM Magnet Academy
- John Paul The Great Academy
- Lafayette Christian Academy
- Lafayette Renaissance Charter High School
- Lafayette High School
- Northside High School
- Ovey Comeaux High School
- St. Thomas More Catholic High School
- Teurlings Catholic High School
- Westminster Christian Academy

=== Youngsville ===
- Acadiana Renaissance Charter School
- Southside High School

== Lafourche Parish ==
- Central Lafourche High School, Raceland
- South Lafourche High School, Galliano

=== Thibodaux ===
- Edward Douglas White Catholic High School
- Thibodaux High School

== Lincoln Parish ==
- Choudrant High School, Choudrant
- Lincoln Preparatory School, Grambling
- Simsboro High School, Simsboro

=== Ruston ===
- Bethel Christian School
- Cedar Creek School
- Ruston High School

== Livingston Parish ==
- Albany High School, Albany
- Denham Springs High School, Denham Springs
- Doyle High School, Livingston
- French Settlement High School, French Settlement
- Holden High School, Holden
- Live Oak High School, Watson
- Maurepas High School, Maurepas
- Springfield High School, Springfield

=== Walker ===
- Livingston Parish Literacy & Technology Center
- Walker High School

== Madison Parish ==
=== Tallulah ===
- Madison High School
- Tallulah Academy/Delta Christian School

== Morehouse Parish ==
=== Bastrop ===
- Bastrop High School
- Beekman Charter School
- Prairie View Academy

== Natchitoches Parish ==
- Lakeview High School, Campti

=== Natchitoches ===
- Louisiana School for Math, Science, and the Arts
- Natchitoches Central High School
- Natchitoches Parish Career & Technical Center
- St. Mary's High School

== Orleans Parish (New Orleans) ==
=== Public Charter ===
- Abramson Sci Academy
- Benjamin Franklin High School
- Booker T. Washington High School
- Cohen College Prep High School
- Collegiate Academies (Abramson Sci Academy, Collegiate Baton Rouge, G. W. Carver, Livingston, Opportunities, Rosenwald)
- Delores Taylor Arthur School for Young Men
- Dr. King Charter School
- Edna Karr High School
- Eleanor McMain Secondary School
- G. W. Carver High School
- International High School of New Orleans
- John F. Kennedy High School
- KIPP New Orleans Schools (Booker T. Washington, Frederick A. Douglass, John F. Kennedy)
- McDonogh 35 High School
- L.B. Landry College and Career Preparatory High School
- Livingston Collegiate Academy
- The Willow School
- Lycée Français de la Nouvelle-Orléans
- Morris Jeff Community School
- The NET Charter High Schools (Central City, Gentilly, East)
- New Harmony High School
- New Orleans Center for Creative Arts (NOCCA)
- New Orleans Charter Science and Mathematics High School
- New Orleans Military & Maritime Academy
- Rooted School
- Rosenwald Collegiate Academy
- Sarah T. Reed High School
- Sophie B. Wright Charter School
- Warren Easton Charter High School

=== Private ===
- Academy of the Sacred Heart
- Brother Martin High School
- Cabrini High School
- De La Salle High School
- Holy Cross High School
- Isidore Newman School
- Jesuit High School
- Life of Christ Christian Academy
- Light City Christian Academy
- McGehee School
- Mount Carmel Academy
- St. Augustine High School
- St. Katharine Drexel Preparatory School
- St. Mary's Academy
- St. Mary's Dominican High School
- Ursuline Academy

== Ouachita Parish ==
=== Monroe ===
- Carroll High School
- Neville High School
- New Vision Learning Academy
- Ouachita Christian High School
- Ouachita Parish High School
- Richwood High School
- River Oaks School
- St. Frederick High School
- Sterlington High School
- Wossman High School

=== West Monroe ===
- Claiborne Christian School
- West Monroe High School
- West Ouachita High School

== Plaquemines Parish ==
- Belle Chasse High School, Belle Chasse
- South Plaquemines High School, Port Sulphur
- Phoenix High School, Braithwaite

== Pointe Coupee Parish ==
- Livonia High School, Livonia

=== New Roads ===
- Catholic High School of Pointe Coupee
- False River Academy

== Rapides Parish ==
- Buckeye High School, Deville
- Northwood High School, Lena
- Oak Hill High School, Hineston
- Pineville High School, Pineville
- Rapides High School, Lecompte
- Tioga High School, Tioga

=== Alexandria ===
- Alexandria Country Day School
- Alexandria Senior High School
- Bolton High School
- Grace Christian School
- Holy Savior Menard Central High School
- Peabody Magnet High School

=== Glenmora ===
- Glenmora High School
- Plainview High School

== Red River Parish ==
=== Coushatta ===
- Red River Senior High School
- Riverdale Academy

== Richland Parish ==
- Mangham High School, Mangham

=== Delhi ===
- Delhi Charter School
- Delhi High School

=== Rayville ===
- Rayville High School
- Riverfield Academy

== Sabine Parish ==
- Converse High School, Converse
- Ebarb School, Ebarb
- Florien High School, Florien
- Many High School, Many
- Negreet High School, Negreet
- Pleasant Hill High School, Pleasant Hill
- Zwolle High School, Zwolle

== St. Bernard Parish ==
- Chalmette High School, Chalmette

== St. Charles Parish ==
- Destrehan High School, Destrehan
- Hahnville High School, Boutte

== St. Helena Parish ==
- St. Helena College and Career Academy, Greensburg

== St. James Parish ==
- Lutcher High School, Lutcher
- St. James High School, St. James

== St. John the Baptist Parish ==
- East St. John High School, Reserve
- West St. John High School, Edgard
- Riverside Academy, Reserve
- St. Charles Catholic High School, Laplace

== St. Landry Parish ==
- Beau Chene High School, Arnaudville
- North Central High School, Lebeau
- Port Barre High School, Port Barre

=== Eunice ===
- Eunice High School
- St. Edmund High School

=== Grand Coteau ===
- Academy of the Sacred Heart
- Berchmans Academy

=== Opelousas ===
- J. S. Clark Leadership Academy
- Magnet Academy for Cultural Arts
- Northwest High School
- Opelousas Catholic School
- Opelousas Senior High School
- Westminster Christian Academy

== St. Martin Parish ==
- Breaux Bridge High School, Breaux Bridge
- Cecilia High School, Cecilia
- Episcopal School of Acadiana, Cade
- St. Martinville Senior High School, St. Martinville

== St. Mary Parish ==
- Berwick High School, Berwick
- Centerville High School, Centerville
- Patterson High School, Patterson
- West St. Mary High School, Baldwin

=== Franklin ===
- Franklin Senior High School
- Hanson Memorial High School
- V.B. Glencoe Charter School

=== Morgan City ===
- Central Catholic High School
- Morgan City High School

== St. Tammany Parish ==
- Pearl River High School, Pearl River

=== Covington ===
- Archbishop Hannan High School
- Christ Episcopal School
- Covington High School
- Northlake Christian School
- St. Paul's School
- St. Scholastica Academy

=== Mandeville ===
- Fontainebleau High School
- Lakeshore High School
- Mandeville High School

=== Slidell ===
- First Baptist Christian School
- Northshore High School
- Pope John Paul II High School
- Salmen High School
- Slidell High School

== Tangipahoa Parish ==
- Amite High Magnet School, Amite
- Independence High Magnet School, Independence
- Loranger High School, Loranger
- Ponchatoula High School, Ponchatoula

=== Hammond ===
- Hammond High Magnet School
- Saint Thomas Aquinas Regional Catholic High School

=== Kentwood ===
- Jewel Sumner High School
- Kentwood High Magnet School

== Tensas Parish ==
=== St. Joseph ===
- Tensas Academy
- Tensas High School

== Terrebonne Parish ==
- H. L. Bourgeois High School, Gray
- South Terrebonne High School, Bourg

=== Houma ===
- Covenant Christian Academy
- Houma Christian School
- Ellender Memorial High School
- Terrebonne High School
- Vandebilt Catholic High School

== Union Parish ==
- Downsville High School, Downsville

=== Farmerville ===
- D'Arbonne Woods Charter School
- Union Parish High School

== Vermilion Parish ==
- Erath High School, Erath
- Gueydan High School, Gueydan
- Kaplan High School, Kaplan
- North Vermilion High School, Maurice

=== Abbeville ===
- Abbeville High School
- Harvest Time Christian Academy
- Vermilion Catholic High School

== Vernon Parish ==
- Anacoco High School, Anacoco
- Evans High School, Evans
- Hornbeck High School, Hornbeck
- Pitkin High School, Pitkin
- Rosepine High School, Rosepine
- Simpson High School, Simpson

=== Leesville ===
- Faith Training Christian Academy
- Hicks High School
- Leesville High School
- Pickering High School

== Washington Parish ==
- Bogalusa High School, Bogalusa
- Mount Hermon High School, Mount Hermon
- Varnado High School, Varnado

=== Franklinton ===
- Bowling Green School
- Franklinton High School
- Pine Junior/Senior High School

== Webster Parish ==
- Doyline High School, Doyline
- Lakeside High School, Sibley
- North Webster High School, Springhill

=== Minden ===
- Glenbrook School
- Minden High School

== West Baton Rouge Parish ==
- Brusly High School, Brusly
- Port Allen High School, Port Allen
- The Christian Academy of Louisiana, Addis

== West Carroll Parish ==
- Forest High School, Forest
- Oak Grove High School, Oak Grove

== West Feliciana Parish ==
- West Feliciana High School, St. Francisville

== Winn Parish ==
- Calvin High School, Calvin
- Dodson High School, Dodson
- Winnfield Senior High School, Winnfield

== See also ==
- List of school districts in Louisiana
- List of former high schools in Louisiana
- List of former high schools in New Orleans
