= List of school districts in Louisiana =

This is a list of school districts in Louisiana.

Most Louisiana school districts are parish school districts while some are city school districts. The U.S. Census Bureau counts both types as independent governments. Recovery School District, which was created to take over failing schools, is directly under the authority of the state government, not counted by the Census Bureau as its own government. The state does not have any public school systems directly dependent on another layer of government like a parish government or a municipal government. The following are Louisiana's city school districts: Baker, Bogalusa, Central, Monroe, and Zachary.

== East Baton Rouge Parish ==
- City of Baker School System
- Central Community School System
- East Baton Rouge Parish School Board
- Zachary Community School District

== Ouachita Parish ==
- City of Monroe School Board
- Ouachita Parish School Board

== Washington Parish ==
- City of Bogalusa School Board
- Washington Parish School Board

== Single-district parishes ==
- Acadia Parish School Board
- Allen Parish School Board
- Ascension Parish School Board
- Assumption Parish School Board
- Avoyelles Parish School Board
- Beauregard Parish School Board
- Bienville Parish School Board
- Bossier Parish School Board
- Caddo Parish School Board
- Calcasieu Parish School Board
- Caldwell Parish School Board
- Cameron Parish School Board
- Catahoula Parish School Board
- Claiborne Parish School Board
- Concordia Parish School Board
- DeSoto Parish School Board
- East Carroll Parish School Board
- East Feliciana Parish School Board
- Evangeline Parish School Board
- Franklin Parish School Board
- Grant Parish School Board
- Iberia Parish School Board
- Iberville Parish School Board
- Jackson Parish School Board
- Jefferson Davis Parish School Board
- Jefferson Parish Public Schools
- Lafayette Parish Public Schools
- Lafourche Parish Public Schools
- LaSalle Parish School Board
- Lincoln Parish School Board
- Livingston Parish School Board
- Madison Parish School Board
- Morehouse Parish School Board
- Natchitoches Parish School Board
- New Orleans Public Schools (Orleans Parish)
- Plaquemines Parish School Board
- Pointe Coupee Parish School Board
- Rapides Parish School Board
- Red River Parish School Board
- Richland Parish School Board
- Sabine Parish School Board
- Saint Bernard Parish School Board
- Saint Charles Parish School Board
- Saint Helena Parish School Board
- Saint James Parish School Board
- Saint John the Baptist Parish School Board
- Saint Landry Parish School Board
- Saint Martin Parish School Board
- Saint Mary Parish School Board
- Saint Tammany Parish School Board
- Tangipahoa Parish School Board
- Tensas Parish School Board
- Terrebonne Parish Public School System
- Union Parish School Board
- Vermilion Parish School Board
- Vernon Parish School Board
- Webster Parish School Board
- West Baton Rouge Parish School Board
- West Carroll Parish School Board
- West Feliciana Parish School Board
- Winn Parish School Board
