= Matt Middleton (American football) =

American football coach (born c.1979)

Current position
- Title: Head coach
- Team: Kansas Wesleyan
- Conference: KCAC
- Record: 7–4

Biographical details
- Born: c. 1979 (age 46–47); West Monroe, Louisiana, U.S.
- Education: Louisiana Tech University (2002)

Playing career
- 1997: Mississippi College
- Position: Wide receiver

Coaching career (HC unless noted)
- 2001–2002: Louisiana Tech (GA)
- 2003–2004: Evangel Christian (LA) (WR)
- 2005–2006: Caldwell Parish HS (LA)
- 2007–2008: Arkansas–Monticello (AHC/OC)
- 2009–2010: Central Arkansas (OC)
- 2011–2013: Arkansas–Monticello (AHC/OC)
- 2015–2016: Prairie View (LA)
- 2017–2020: West Ouachita HS (LA)
- 2021: Cedar Creek (LA)
- 2022 (spring): Southern Arkansas (OC/QB)
- 2022: Cedar Creek (LA)
- 2023–2024: Harding (QB/FB)
- 2025–present: Kansas Wesleyan

Administrative career (AD unless noted)
- 2005–2007: Caldwell Parish HS (LA)
- 2021–2022: Cedar Creek (LA)

Head coaching record
- Overall: 7–4 (college); 60–44 (high school)

Matthew Middleton (born c. 1979) is an American college football coach. He is the head football coach for Kansas Wesleyan University, a position he has held since 2025. He was the head football coach for Caldwell Parish High School from 2005 to 2006, Prairie View Academy from 2015 to 2016, West Ouachita High School from 2017 to 2020, and Cedar Creek School from 2021 to 2022. He also coached for Louisiana Tech, Evangel Christian Academy, Arkansas–Monticello, Central Arkansas, Southern Arkansas, and Harding. He played college football for Mississippi College as a wide receiver.

== Head coaching record ==
=== College ===
Year	Team	Overall	Conference	Standing	Bowl/playoffs
Kansas Wesleyan Coyotes (Kansas Collegiate Athletic Conference) (2025–present)
2025	Kansas Wesleyan	7–4	3–2	T–3rd (Bissell)	
2026	Kansas Wesleyan	0–0	0–0	(Bissell)	
Kansas Wesleyan:		7–4	3–2		
Total:		7–4			

=== High school ===
Year	Team	Overall	Conference	Standing	Bowl/playoffs
Caldwell Parish Spartans () (2005–2006)
2005	Caldwell Parish	6–5	2–3	4th	
2006	Caldwell Parish	8–3	3–2	3rd	
Caldwell Parish:		14–8	5–5		
Prairie View Spartans () (2015–2016)
2015	Prairie View	10–2	4–0	1st	
2016	Prairie View	9–2	4–0	1st	
Prairie View:		19–4	8–0		
West Ouachita Chiefs () (2017–2020)
2017	West Ouachita	3–7	1–2	3rd	
2018	West Ouachita	4–6	0–3	4th	
2019	West Ouachita	6–5	1–4	5th	
2020	West Ouachita	3–3	0–3	6th	
West Ouachita:		16–21	2–10		
Cedar Creek Cougars () (2021–2022)
2021	Cedar Creek	6–4	6–2	2nd	
2022	Cedar Creek	7–5	2–2	3rd	
Cedar Creek:		13–9	8–4		
Total:		62–42			
National championship Conference title Conference division title or championship game berth
