= Dry Creek Airport =

Dry Creek Airport may refer to:

- Dry Creek Airport (Texas) a private use airport in Cypress, Texas, United States
- Dry Creek Airpark a private use airport in Prineville, Oregon, United States

Airports in places named Dry Creek:

- B T & K H Ranch Airport a private use airport in Dry Creek, Louisiana, United States
