= Ryan Cross (disambiguation) =

Ryan Cross may refer to:

- Ryan Cross (basketball), (born c. 1972), American basketball player and coach
- Ryan Cross (footballer) (born 1972), English footballer, see List of Bury F.C. players (25–99 appearances)
- Ryan Cross (born 1979) Rugby Union footballer
