= BPSB =

BPSB may refer to:

- Beauregard Parish School Board
- Bienville Parish School Board
