= WPSB =

WPSB may refer to:

- WPSB-LP, a low-power radio station (99.5 FM) licensed to serve Ocean City, Maryland, United States
- WENN (AM), a radio station (1320 AM) licensed to serve Birmingham, Alabama, United States, which held the call sign WPSB from 2006 to 2009
- Winn Parish School Board in Louisiana
