= Atlanta High School =

Atlanta High School may refer to:

- Atlanta High School (Louisiana), Atlanta, Louisiana
- Atlanta High School (Missouri), Atlanta, Missouri
- Atlanta High School (Texas), Atlanta, Texas
