= Louisiana Independent School Association =

Louisiana private school athletic league

LISA logo

The Louisiana Independent School Association (1970–1992), more commonly known as LISA, was an athletic association created to offer interscholastic sports at all-white segregation academies in the state of Louisiana. The organization is no longer in existence.

In its ruling on Brumfield v. Dodd (1975), the U.S. District Court for the Eastern District of Louisiana described LISA as "an organization of private schools which publicly maintains a racist policy and has advised its members openly how to discourage Black enrollment".

== History ==
The organization was founded amid a wave of new private schools that were being opened in response to most Louisiana public schools being desegregated in the 1969-70 or 1970-71 school year. Its public-school equivalent was the Louisiana High School Athletic Association. In 1970, LISA's secretary said in response to the loss of tax exemptions due to the refusal to include Black students, "We are not interested in an IRS exemption under those conditions".

Its charter meeting was held in April 1970; it launched that fall with 20 member schools, a number that increased to 54 by the following school year. LISA's logo, reflecting its segregated origins and location in what was formerly the Confederacy, featured an adaptation of the Confederate battle flag, which has been described as a White supremacist hate symbol. No Black athlete played in a LISA all-star game until 1991.

By the 1980s, as segregation academies closed or moved to the LHSAA, membership declined. In October 1991, LISA's members voted unanimously to merge into the equivalent association in Mississippi, the Mississippi Private School Association (now the Midsouth Association of Independent Schools). LISA held its last competition in 1992 and ceased to exist as a corporate entity on November 17, 1997.

== Organization ==
Schools competed in two divisions, A and AA, according to enrollment, with districts arranged by geography and traditional rivalries. Postseason all-star games were held in football and basketball.

LISA’s competitive sports programs included baseball, softball, basketball, cross country, track and field, and football.

== Former member schools ==
- American Academy (Bogalusa)
- Amy Bradford Ware (Opelousas)
- Baptist Christian Academy (Shreveport)
- Belmont Academy (Opelousas)
- Bienville Academy (Bryceland)
- Bowling Green School (Franklinton)
- Briarfield Academy (Lake Providence)
- Calvary Baptist Academy (Shreveport)
- Cedar Creek School (Ruston)
- Central Private School (Baton Rouge)
- Central School (Grand Cane)
- Claiborne Academy (Haynesville)
- East Ascension Academy (Gonzales)
- East Union Academy (Marion)
- False River Academy (New Roads)
- First Baptist Academy (Shreveport)
- Forest Hill Academy (Forest Hill)
- Franklin Academy (Winnsboro)
- Friendship Academy (Shreveport)
- Glenbrook School (Minden)
- Grawood Christian School (Keithville)
- Huntington School (Ferriday)
- Montrose Christian (Montrose, Arkansas)
- Monroe Christian School (Monroe)
- Mount Olive Christian School (Athens)
- Natalbany Baptist Christian School(Hammond)
- Natchitoches Academy (Natchitoches)
- Oak Forest Academy (Amite)
- Parkview Baptist School (Baton Rouge)
- Plain Dealing Academy (Plain Dealing)
- Prairie View Academy (Bastrop)
- Prytania Academy (New Orleans)
- Ridgedale Academy (West Monroe)
- Riverdale Academy (East Point)
- Riverfield Academy (Rayville)
- Riverside Academy (Reserve)
- River Oaks High School (Monroe)
- Sam Barthe School for Boys (New Orleans)
- Sam Crowe (Oak Grove)
- St. Martin Academy (St. Martinville)
- Silliman Institute (Clinton)
- Shreve Christian (Shreveport)
- South Rapides Academy (Lecompte)
- Southland Academy (Dubach)
- Southwood Academy (Hammond)
- Starlet Academy
- Tallulah Academy (Tallulah)
- Tensas Academy (St. Joseph)
- Trinity Heights Christian Academy (Shreveport)
- Valley Forge Academy (Amite)
- Westhill Academy (Marthaville)
- Winn Academy (Winnfield)
