= Campti (YTB-816) =

Tugboat of the United States Navy

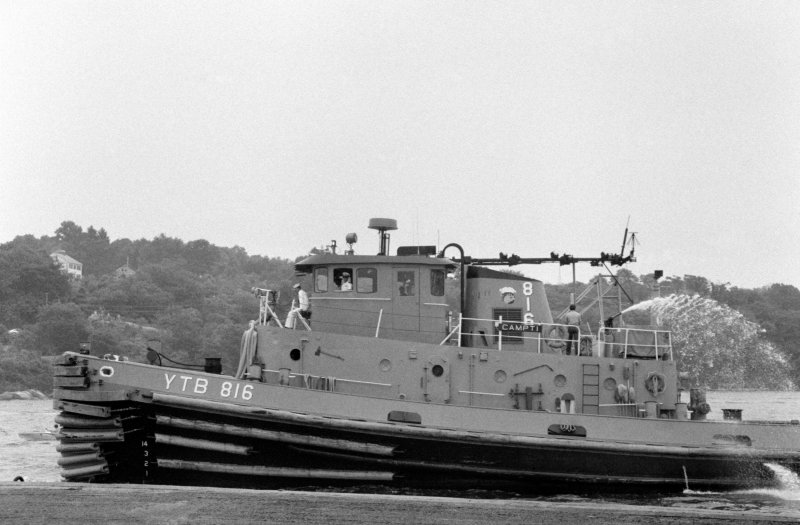
- Port broadside view of Campti (YTB-816) underway. Campti is assisting in the maneuvering of ex-USS Nautilus (SSN-571) into a berth at pier 33. Naval Submarine Base, New London, 6 July 1985.

History

United States
- Awarded: 9 August 1971
- Builder: Marinette Marine, Marinette, Wisconsin
- Laid down: 21 May 1972
- Launched: 4 November 1972
- Acquired: 22 December 1972
- Stricken: 9 November 1999
- Identification: IMO number: 8991671; MMSI number: 366798810; Callsign: WDA3468
- Fate: Sold 27 September 2000

General characteristics
- Class & type: Natick-class large harbor tug
- Displacement: 286 long tons (291 t) (light); 346 long tons (352 t) (full)
- Length: 109 ft (33 m)
- Beam: 31 ft (9.4 m)
- Draft: 14 ft (4.3 m)
- Speed: 12 knots (14 mph; 22 km/h)
- Complement: 12
- Armament: None

Campti (YTB-816) was a United States Navy Natick-class large harbor tug named for Campti, Louisiana.

== Construction ==
The contract for Campti was awarded 9 August 1971. She was laid down on 21 May 1972 at Marinette, Wisconsin, by Marinette Marine and launched 4 November 1972.

== Operational history ==
Delivered to the navy 22 December 1972, Campti was assigned to the Naval Submarine Base New London, Connecticut. Sometime between 1985 and 1990, she was reassigned to Naval Amphibious Base Little Creek Virginia, where she served the rest of her career until retirement.

Stricken from the Navy List 9 November 1999, ex-Campti was sold by Defense Reutilization and Marketing Service (DRMS) 27 September 2000 to Hartley Marine. She was renamed Seguin and served Hartley until at least 2007.
