= River Oaks School =

Private school in Louisiana, United States

Location
- 600 Finks Hideaway Rd; Monroe address, (Ouachita Parish), Louisiana 71203; United States; 32.5680°N 92.0616°W

Information
- Type: Private
- Motto: Deus Patria Ipse (God himself is my homeland)
- Established: 1969
- Headmaster: David Nordman
- Grades: K–12
- Gender: Coeducational
- Language: English
- Colors: Blue and Silver
- Song: Oaks and Rivers
- Sports: Football, Baseball, Softball, Basketball, Soccer, Golf, Tennis, Track/Field, Cheer-leading, Dance
- Team name: Mustangs
- Rivals: Riverfield Academy (Rayville, LA), Prairie View Academy (Bastrop, LA), Glenbrook School (Minden, LA)
- Accreditation: Mississippi Association of Independent Schools

River Oaks School is a private PK3–12 school in unincorporated Ouachita Parish, Louisiana, with a Monroe postal address, that was founded as a segregation academy.

== History ==
River Oaks School was as founded in 1969 as a segregation academy in response to the court ordered desegregation of public schools. In 1984, the school's alleged racially discriminatory admission policy formed part of the basis of the Supreme Court case Allen v. Wright.

== Athletics ==
River Oaks School athletics competes in the MAIS (Midsouth Association of Independent Schools).

=== Football ===
Football championships

- (1) LISA State Championship: 1990
- (2) MPSA/MAIS State Championships: 2005, 2010

Football championship history
The River Oaks Mustangs football team won its first championship was in 1990, when it was still part of the now defunct Louisiana Independent School Association with a 12–0 season, defeating Central Private School 28–6. In 2005, the football team led to another undefeated season with 14–0, along with its first MPSA championship, winning against Lee Academy (AR) 32–29 in overtime. In 2010, the football team again led to a championship with a 13–1 record, defeating Leake Academy (MS) 40–13 in MAIS.

Football facilities
The football team plays at Woody Boyles Memorial Stadium at Robert Hannah Field.

=== Soccer ===
The River Oaks soccer team has won six MAIS state titles, in 2005, 2006, 2007, 2008, 2011, and in 2020.

== Notable alumni ==
- Kevin Griffin, frontman of Better Than Ezra
- Gene Johnson, football player and coach

== Notable faculty ==
- Frank Scelfo, Head Football Coach of Southeastern Louisiana Lions football, football coach from 1985-1986
