= Gene Johnson (quarterback) =

American football player (born 1969)

Profile
- Position: Quarterback

Personal information
- Born: August 30, 1969 (age 57); Shreveport, Louisiana, U.S.
- Listed height: 6 ft 0 in (1.83 m)
- Listed weight: 205 lb (93 kg)

Career information
- High school: River Oaks (Monroe, Louisiana)
- College: Louisiana Tech (1988–1991)
- NFL draft: 1992: undrafted

Career history

Playing
- Arizona Rattlers (1992); Memphis Pharaohs (1995)

Coaching
- Southern Miss (1994–1995) Graduate assistant; Klein Forest High School (1997–1999) Assistant coach; Klein Forest High School (2000–2003) Head coach; Arizona (2004) Graduate assistant; Hightower High School (2005–2007) Head coach; Cypress Ranch High School (2008–2018) Head coach; Waller High School (2019–present) Head coach

Career AFL statistics
- Comp. / Att.: 163 / 301
- Passing yards: 1,764
- TD–INT: 24–11
- Passer rating: 76.34
- Rushing TDs: 2
- Stats at ArenaFan.com

Gene Johnson (born August 30, 1969) is an American former professional football quarterback who played two seasons in the Arena Football League (AFL) with the Arizona Rattlers and Memphis Pharaohs. He played college football at Louisiana Tech University.

== Early life and college ==
Johnson was born on August 30, 1969. He played high school football at River Oaks High School in Monroe, Louisiana.

Johnson lettered for the Louisiana Tech Bulldogs from 1988 to 1991. He completed 75 of 183 passes (41.0%) for 870 yards, four touchdowns, and 13 interceptions his freshman year in 1988. He recorded 147 completions on 296 passing attempts (49.7%) for 1,779 yards, 12 touchdowns, and ten interceptions as a sophomore in 1989. Johnson completed 165 of 297 passes (55.6%) for 2,129 yards, 13 touchdowns, and nine interceptions his junior year in 1990. He totaled 118 completions on 207 attempts (57.0%) for 1,281 yards, ten touchdowns, and six interceptions his senior season in 1991.

== Professional career ==
After going undrafted in the 1992 NFL draft, Johnson signed with the Arizona Rattlers of the Arena Football League (AFL). He played in all ten games for the Rattlers during the 1992 season, completing 163 of 301 passes (54.2%) for 1,764 yards, 24 touchdowns, and 11 interceptions while also scoring two rushing touchdowns. The Rattlers finished the season with a 4–6 record.

Johnson played in seven games for the Memphis Pharaohs of the AFL in 1995 but did not record any statistics.

== Coaching career ==
Johnson began his coaching career as a graduate assistant for the Southern Miss Golden Eagles from 1994 to 1995. He was a coach at Klein Forest High School in Houston, Texas from 1997 to 2003, including four seasons as head coach from 2000 to 2003, accumulating a record of 37–10. He joined the Arizona Wildcats as an offensive graduate assistant in January 2004 but left in May 2004. He then returned to the Greater Houston area and was the assistant principal at Klein Oak High School. In 2005, Johnson became the head coach at Hightower High School in Missouri City, Texas and served in that role through the 2007 season. He was then the head coach at Cypress Ranch High School from the school's founding in 2008 until 2018. In 2019, he became the head coach at Waller High School.
