= Harley Bozeman =

American politician (1891–1971)

Harley Bernard Bozeman

Louisiana State Representative for Winn Parish
- In office 1928–1929
- Preceded by: J. W. Gaar
- Succeeded by: A. Lawson McDonald

Personal details
- Born: May 3, 1891 Arkadelphia, Arkansas, US
- Died: May 16, 1971 (aged 80) Winnfield, Louisiana
- Resting place: Winnfield Cemetery
- Party: Democratic
- Spouse: Annabell Estes Bozeman (married 1922–1956, her death)
- Children: 2
- Education: Winnfield Senior High School
- Occupation: Farmer; salesman; historian

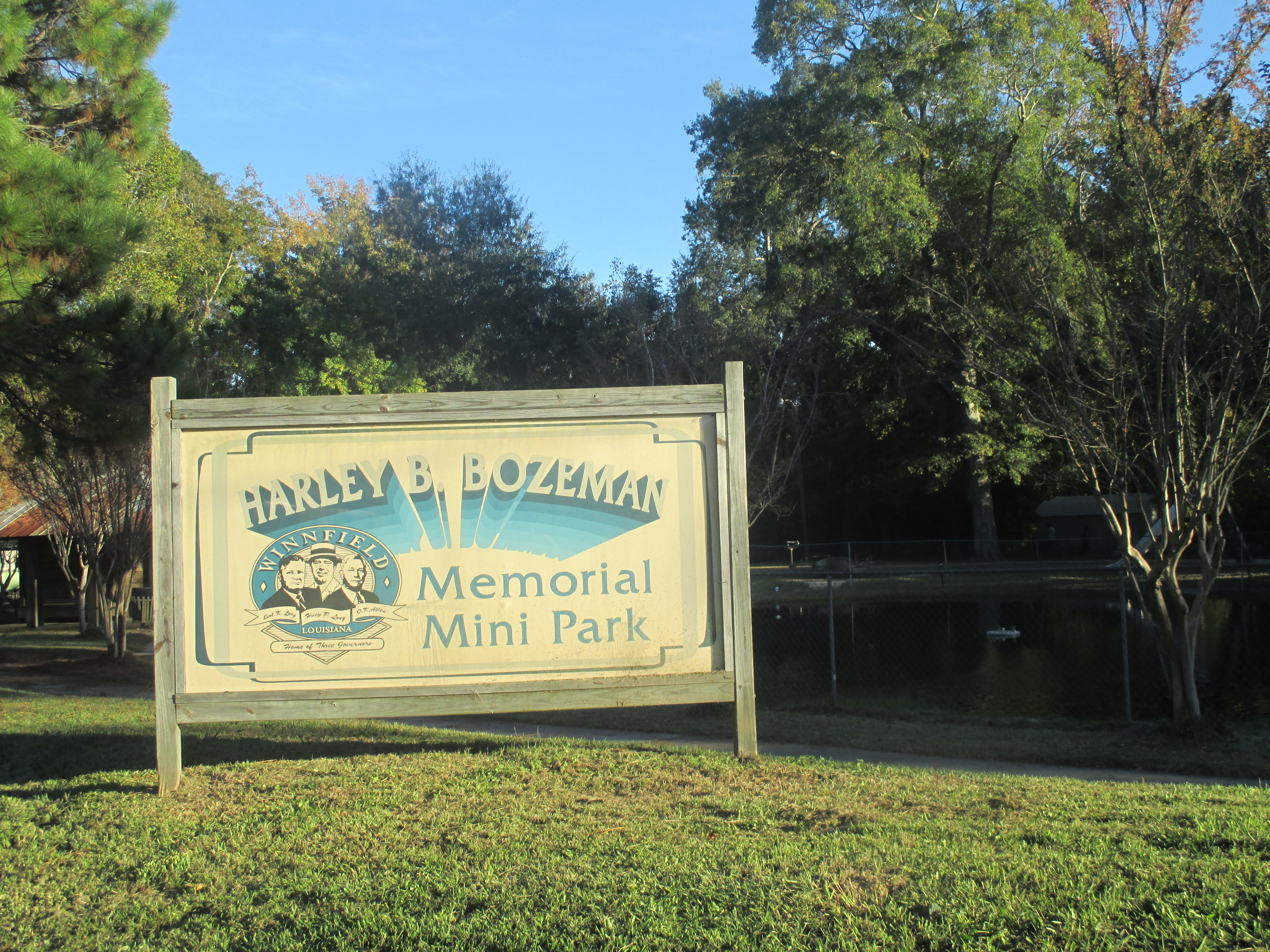
Bozeman is honored by the naming of a mini-park in Winnfield.

Harley Bernard Bozeman (May 3, 1891 – May 16, 1971) was a salesman, tree farmer, politician, and historian from Winnfield, Louisiana, who served in the Louisiana House of Representatives from 1928 to 1929. He was a confidant of Democratic Governors Huey Pierce Long Jr., and Earl Kemp Long, who were also from Winn Parish in North Louisiana.

== Background ==
Bozeman was born at the Montroy Steamboat landing located between Arkadelphia in Clark County and Camden in Ouachita County in south Arkansas. He had two brothers and three sisters.

Martin and Caroline Bozeman moved their family to Dodson in Winn Parish when Harley was ten years of age. When he was fourteen, they relocated to the larger Winnfield, the parish seat of government. There Bozeman graduated in 1910 from Winnfield High School, now known as Winnfield Senior High School, where he was involved in student debates with his young friend Huey Long and exhibited a great interest in the study of history. After leaving high school, Bozeman was a traveling salesman of items such as baking powder, starch, and pharmaceutical supplies. He often was joined by Huey Long in such pursuits. Bozeman served briefly in 1918 the United States Army, but a case of influenza and pneumonia soon returned him to Winnfield.

With his pharmacist brother Mike, Bozeman for a time operated the old Winnfield Drug Company. Bozeman returned temporarily to the life of a traveling salesman. In Tyler, Texas, he met and soon married in 1922 Annabell Estes. Back in Winnfield, he was sales manager for the Southern Minerals Company until the company quarry was sold in 1923. Harley and Annabell Bozeman had two children.

== Public life ==
In 1928, newly elected Representative Bozeman was named chairman of the House Appropriations Committee. He introduced a bill for taxpayer-funded textbooks, a change also associated with John Sparks Patton and the Long political dynasty. He soon resigned from the House to become chairman of the Louisiana Tax Commission. In private life, he purchased cut-over timberlands and was one of the first in Winn Parish to have a designated tree farm. For many years, Bozeman was an unpaid observer for the National Weather Service. He subsequently served on the Winnfield City Council, in which capacity he worked to establish the municipally owned electric system in 1942.

A charter member of First Federal Savings and Loan Association in Winnfield, he served on the board of directors until October 1970, when his son, Estes, succeeded him.

== Historian ==
Annabell Bozeman was a founder of the Winn Parish Library. Before her death she prodded her husband to begin writing the history that he had lived. In 1956, Bozeman hence launched a series of historical articles which ran in the weekly Winn Parish Enterprise-News-American newspaper under the name "Winn Parish As I Have Known It." These articles continued until March 1971, but were sporadic in the last months of his life because of illness.

Bozeman's articles in The Enterprise covered many previously unknown facets of Winn Parish history. He conducted many interviews with old-timers and pored over old manuscripts, letters, and other historical sources. He possessed a personal memory of the past, and his work was often accompanied by rare pictures, drawings, maps, and letters. His articles were sometimes entertaining and frequently replete with humor. In addition to his writing, Bozeman helped libraries even beyond Winn Parish to build up their historical files. He became a source authority of historical materials. His local, regional, and state history was so highly regarded that the Louisiana State University professor T. Harry Williams quoted extensively from Bozeman in Williams' Huey Long (1969). Bozeman tried to answer personally the large volume of mail that he received regarding his historical work but at times was overwhelmed in doing so.

== Death and legacy ==
Bozeman was a long time member of the First Baptist Church in downtown Winnfield. He died in Winnfield General Hospital at the age of eighty. He is interred beside his wife, who preceded him in death by fourteen years, at Winnfield Cemetery.

The Harley Bozeman Mini-Park in Winnfield is named in his honor. In 2002, Bozeman was posthumously inducted into the Louisiana Political Museum and Hall of Fame, located in Winnfield. Huey and Earl Long were among the original inductees to the hall of fame in 1993. Inducted with Bozeman nine years later were two other Longite figures, Bill Dodd and Jesse Bankston, who was then still living.

| Preceded by J. W. Gaar | Louisiana State Representative from Winn Parish; Harley Bernard Bozeman; 1928–1929 | Succeeded by A. Lawson McDonald |
