= Friendship Academy, Shreveport =

Defunct school in Louisiana, United States

Location
- 32.47889°N 93.88789°W

Information
- Established: 1970
- Closed: 1985
- Grades: K-12
- Yearbook: Eyrie

Friendship Academy, Shreveport was a school on the west side of Shreveport (Caddo Parish), Louisiana. The school opened on Winderweedle Road on the west side of Shreveport for the 1970–71 school year. It was a member of the Louisiana Independent School Association, an athletic conference of segregation academies formed in 1970. Friendship Academy merged with West Shreveport Academy beginning with the 1971–72 school year, with a new building on Jefferson Paige Road. It had 430 students at that time. The school closed in 1985, by which time enrollment had decreased to 140.
