= Zach Watson =

American baseball player (born 1997)

Free agent
- Outfielder
- Born: June 25, 1997 (age 29); West Monroe, Louisiana, U.S.
- Bats: Right Throws: Right
- Stats at Baseball Reference

Zachary Layne Watson (born June 25, 1997) is an American professional baseball outfielder who is a free agent. He was drafted by the Baltimore Orioles in the 3rd round of the 2019 Major League Baseball draft. He currently plays with the Texas Tailgaters, one of the Savannah Bananas' opposing teams in its inaugural season.

== Amateur career ==
Watson attended West Ouachita High School in West Monroe, Louisiana where he played baseball. He played shortstop and was the team's closer. As a senior, he batted .481 with ten home runs, 46 RBIs, and 18 doubles and was named the All-Northeast Louisiana Big School Offensive Player of the Year for the third year in a row as West Ouachita finished as the Class 4A state runner-up. He was not drafted out of high school in the 2016 Major League Baseball draft and he enrolled at Louisiana State University where he played college baseball for the LSU Tigers.

As a freshman at LSU, Watson transitioned to the outfield and began playing mainly center field. He started the season as a bench player and did not start his first game until March 11, when he went 3-for-4 with one home run and four RBIs, earning him the starting center field job. He was named the SEC Freshman of the Week on May 8 after going 5-for-10 with four RBIs and a .583 on-base percentage in three games versus South Carolina. Watson finished the season batting .317 with nine home runs, 37 RBIs, and 12 stolen bases in 64 games, earning him a spot on the 2017 Freshman All-SEC Team. In the 2017 NCAA tournament, he batted .333 with five home runs, ten RBIs, four steals, and 12 runs in 12 games, and he was named to the 2017 College World Series All-Tournament team. After the season, Watson was named a Freshman All-American by Perfect Game, Baseball America, Collegiate Baseball Newspaper, and D1Baseball.com. That summer, he played in the Northwoods League for the Rockford Rivets where he batted .342 with two home runs, 14 RBIs, four doubles, and 11 runs scored in 38 at-bats, earning him the title of number one prospect in the league.

Prior to the 2018 season, Watson was named a preseason All-American by Perfect Game, Collegiate Baseball Newspaper, and D1Baseball.com. He was also considered a top prospect for the 2018 Major League Baseball draft. He returned as LSU's starting center fielder to begin the season, but missed nine games from late February to early March to a strained oblique muscle suffered during LSU's first series of the season. He was named to the SEC All-Defensive Team and won an ABCA/Rawlings Gold Glove. Watson finished his sophomore year batting .308 with seven home runs, 34 RBIs, and 14 stolen bases in 57 games (all starts). He was chosen in the 40th and last round of the draft by the Boston Red Sox but did not sign. He played for the USA Baseball Collegiate National Team that summer along with playing for the Harwich Mariners of the Cape Cod Baseball League. In 2019, Watson's junior year at LSU, he hit .308 with seven home runs, 42 RBIs, and 11 stolen bases in 60 games. He earned a Gold Glove and was named to the SEC All-Defensive Team for the second consecutive year.

== Professional career ==
=== Baltimore Orioles ===
Watson was selected by the Baltimore Orioles in the third round, with the 79th overall pick, of the 2019 Major League Baseball draft and he signed for $780,400. He made his professional debut with the Aberdeen IronBirds of the Low–A New York–Penn League before being promoted to the Delmarva Shorebirds of the Single–A South Atlantic League in July. A wrist injury ended his season prematurely in August. Over 36 games between the two clubs, he hit .226 with five home runs, 17 RBIs, and five stolen bases.

Watson did not play a game in 2020 due to the cancellation of the minor league season because of the COVID-19 pandemic. To begin the 2021 season, he was assigned to Aberdeen, now members of the High-A East. He was promoted to the Bowie Baysox of the Double-A Northeast in mid-July. Over 105 games between the two clubs, Watson slashed .248/.294/.468 with 21 home runs, 66 RBIs and 24 stolen bases. He returned to Bowie for the 2022 season. Over 95 games, he batted .199 with eight home runs, 32 RBIs, and five stolen bases.

Watson began the 2023 season back in Bowie, his third straight season with the affiliate. In 52 games, he batted .209/.265/.396 with 8 home runs, 31 RBI, and 11 stolen bases. On July 10, 2023, Watson was released by the Orioles organization.

=== Lexington Counter Clocks ===
On August 5, 2023, Watson signed with the Lexington Counter Clocks of the Atlantic League of Professional Baseball. In 28 appearances for Lexington, he batted .309/.346/.463 with three home runs, 15 RBI, and six stolen bases. Watson became a free agent following the season.
