= Danny Johnson (American football) =

American football player (born 1995)

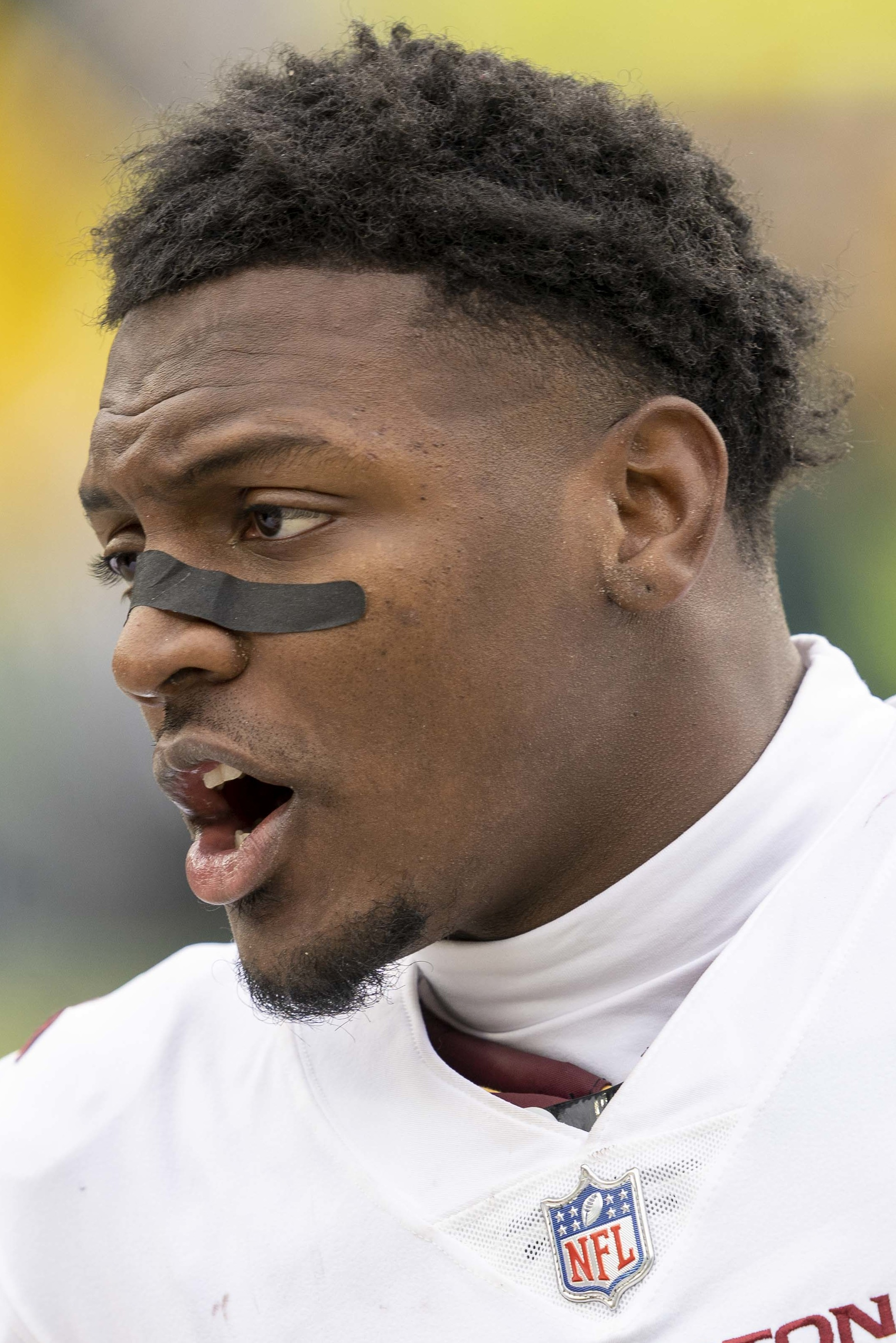
- Johnson in 2021

Profile
- Position: Cornerback

Personal information
- Born: November 17, 1995 (age 30); Jackson, Louisiana, U.S.
- Listed height: 5 ft 9 in (1.75 m)
- Listed weight: 190 lb (86 kg)

Career information
- High school: East Feliciana (Jackson)
- College: Southern
- NFL draft: 2018: undrafted

Career history
- Washington Redskins / Football Team / Commanders (2018–2023)

Awards and highlights
- Third-team FCS All-American (2016); 3× First-team All-SWAC (2015, 2016, 2017)

Career NFL statistics
- Total tackles: 96
- Sacks: 1
- Pass deflections: 14
- Interceptions: 1
- Forced fumbles: 1
- Stats at Pro Football Reference

Danny Johnson (born November 17, 1995) is an American professional football cornerback. He played college football at Southern and was signed by Washington as an undrafted free agent in 2018.

== College career ==
Johnson played college football at Southern University as a cornerback and return specialist. He was named First-team All-SWAC as a cornerback in three consecutive seasons, from 2015–2017, and was named Second-team All-SWAC as a return specialist in 2017. Johnson was also named Third-team FCS All-American as a cornerback in 2016.

Johnson was invited to the 2018 Senior Bowl, becoming the first player from that school to receive an invitation in two decades.

== Professional career ==
Pre-draft measurables
Height	Weight	Arm length	Hand span	40-yard dash	10-yard split	20-yard split	20-yard shuttle	Three-cone drill	Vertical jump	Broad jump	Bench press
5 ft 9 1/4 in (1.76 m)	181 lb (82 kg)	31 1/8 in (0.79 m)	9 1/4 in (0.23 m)	4.44 s	1.53 s	2.58 s	4.30 s	7.23 s	35.5 in (0.90 m)	10 ft 3 in (3.12 m)	15 reps

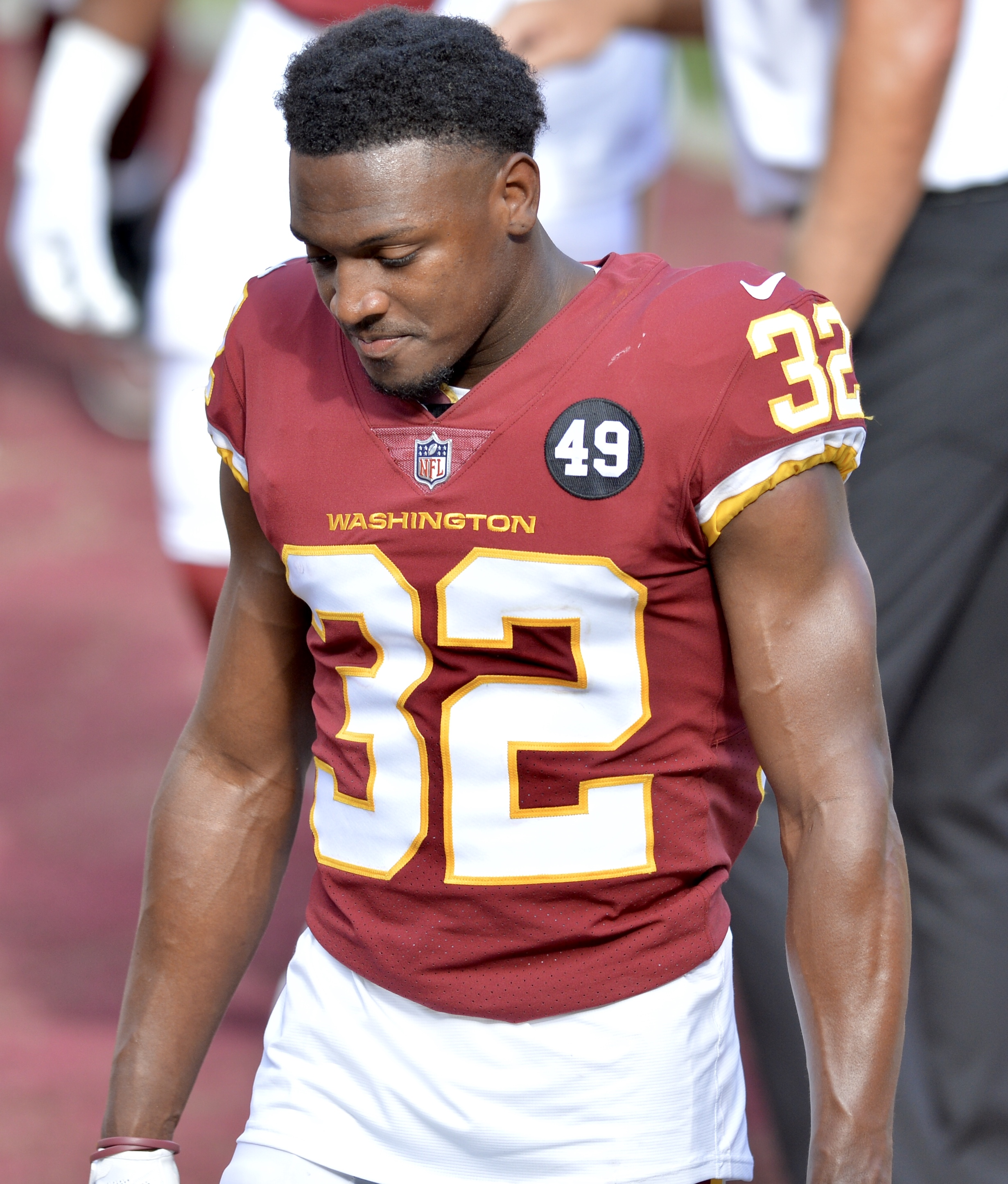
Johnson in 2020

Johnson participated in the 2018 NFL Combine. Johnson went unselected in the 2018 NFL draft, but signed an undrafted free agent contract with the Washington Redskins soon after. He made his NFL debut in the Redskins' season opener against the Arizona Cardinals. He had a 24-yard kick return in the 24–6 victory. He was placed on injured reserve on December 19, 2018.

Johnson was placed on the physically unable to perform list to start the 2019 season while recovering from injury. He was activated on December 10, 2019. He started two games before being placed on injured reserve on December 24, 2019. He re-signed with the team on March 23, 2021, but was waived on August 31, 2021, and re-signed to the practice squad the following day. Johnson was signed to the active roster on October 5, 2021.

Johnson re-signed with the team on March 23, 2022. He was waived on August 30, 2022, and signed to the practice squad the following day. He was promoted back to the active roster on October 25, 2022. In Week 9 of the 2022 season, Johnson recorded his first career interception against the Minnesota Vikings off a pass deflected by Benjamin St-Juste in the end zone.

Johnson signed a two-year contract extension with the Commanders on March 16, 2023. Following first round rookie, Emmanuel Forbes, being benched in Week 5 and downgraded on the team's depth chart, Johnson was elevated into the defense's starting lineup. He was released on December 13.
