= Ryan Cross (basketball) =

American basketball coach

Current position
- Title: Head coach
- Team: Louisiana–Monroe
- Conference: Sun Belt
- Record: 2–5 (.286)

Playing career
- 1991–1992: Santa Fe CC
- 1992–1995: Buffalo

Coaching career (HC unless noted)
- 1995–1996: Buffalo (GA)
- 1996–1998: Barton County CC (assistant)
- 1998–1999: Barton County CC
- 1999–2003: Chipola
- 2003–2006: Louisiana Tech (assistant)
- 2006–2011: Caldwell Parish HS
- 2011–2012: Bossier Parish CC (assistant)
- 2012–2018: Louisiana–Monroe (assistant)
- 2018–2020: Louisiana–Monroe (associate HC)
- 2020–2023: UAB (assistant)
- 2023–2026: UAB (associate HC)
- 2026–present: Louisiana–Monroe

Administrative career (AD unless noted)
- 1999–2003: Chipola

Head coaching record
- Overall: 3–5 (.375) (NCAA); 115–45 (.719) (JUCO); 109–57 (.657) (high school)

Ryan Cross is an American basketball coach and former player. He is currently the head coach of the Louisiana–Monroe Warhawks men's basketball team.

== Career ==
Cross played college basketball at Buffalo from 1992 to 1995. He began his coaching career serving as a graduate assistant for a season at his alma mater, before becoming an assistant at Barton County Community College. Cross took his first head coaching job at Barton County in 1998, leading the team to a 35–3 record in his first and only season. He then became the head coach at Chipola recording an 80–42 record across four seasons, before leaving to take an assistant coaching position at Louisiana Tech.

In May 2006, Cross admitted to being guilty of committing wire fraud while coaching for Barton County. He was sentenced to four months in federal prison followed by three years of probation. From 2006 to 2011, Cross served as the head coach at Caldwell Parish High School, totaling a 109–57 record. He joined Louisiana–Monroe as an assistant coach in 2012. Entering the 2018–19 season, Cross was promoted to associate head coach.

In April 2020, Cross was hired as an assistant at UAB under head coach Andy Kennedy. He was promoted to associate head coach prior to the start of the 2023–24 season. During the 2025–26 season, Cross served as the Blazer's interim head coach for a game while Kennedy was out with an illness.

On March 25, 2026, Cross was named the next head coach at Louisiana–Monroe, replacing Phil Cunningham.

== Head coaching record ==
Record table
Season	Team	Overall	Conference	Standing	Postseason
UAB (American Conference) (2025–2026)
2025–26	UAB (Note: Served as acting head coach for one game while head coach Andy Kennedy was out with illness)	1–0	1–0		
UAB:		1–0 (1.000)	1–0 (1.000)		
Louisiana–Monroe Warhawks (Sun Belt) (2026–present)
2026–27	Louisiana–Monroe	2–5	0–0		
ULM:		2–5 (.286)	0–0 (–)		
Total:		3–5 (.375)			
National champion Postseason invitational champion Conference regular season champion Conference regular season and conference tournament champion Division regular season champion Division regular season and conference tournament champion Conference tournament champion
