= South Beauregard High School =

Location
- 151 Longville Church Road; Longville, (Beauregard Parish), Louisiana 70652; United States; 30.5689°N 93.2345°W

Information
- Type: Public high school
- School district: Beauregard Parish School Board
- Principal: Dwight Hudler
- Staff: 48.31 (FTE)
- Grades: 7-12
- Enrollment: 796 (2023-2024)
- Student to teacher ratio: 16.48
- Colors: Purple and gold
- Athletics conference: . Sec fcs
- Mascot: Knight
- Nickname: Golden Knights
- Website: sbhs.beau.k12.la.us

South Beauregard High School is a middle and high school in Longville, Louisiana. It is a part of Beauregard Parish Schools.

== History ==
Joey Bartz became the principal of South Beauregard High School for the 2017–18 school year, after his predecessor, Tammy Crain, moved into the district office as an instructional supervisor. As of 2019, South Beauregard High School has been ranked as one of the highest rated public high schools in the state of Louisiana.and current principle Dwight Hudler (2024–present).

== Athletics ==
South Beauregard High athletics compete in the LHSAA.

=== State Championships ===
Baseball

- (2) 2017, 2024

Girls Basketball

- (2) 1971, 2017

Softball

- (2) 1999, 2004

=== State Runners-Up ===
Baseball

- (2) 2016, 2019

Girls Basketball

- (3) 1992, 1995, 2009

Softball

- (2) 2003, 2005
