= Richland Parish School Board =

School district in Louisiana, United States

Coordinates: 32.4690°N 91.7531°W

The Richland Parish School Board is an entity responsible for the operation of public schools in Richland Parish, Louisiana, United States. It is headquartered in the town of Rayville.

== Schools ==
=== High schools ===
- Grades 9–12
  - Delhi High School (Delhi)
  - Mangham High School (Mangham)
  - Rayville High School (Rayville)

=== Middle/junior high schools ===
- Grades 5–8
  - Delhi Middle School (Delhi)
  - Mangham Junior High School (Mangham)
  - Rayville Junior High School (Rayville)

=== Elementary schools ===
- Grades PK–4
  - Delhi Elementary School (Delhi)
- Grades PK–5
  - Mangham Elementary School (Mangham)
  - Rayville Elementary School (Rayville)
- Grades K–8
  - Holly Ridge Elementary School (Unincorporated area)
  - Start Elementary School (Unincorporated area)

=== Alternative schools ===
- Richland Alternative School (Unincorporated area)

== Demographics ==
- Total students (as of October 1, 2007): 3,397
- Gender
  - Male: 52%
  - Female: 48%
- Race/ethnicity
  - African American: 53.14%
  - White: 45.92%
  - Hispanic: 0.74%
  - Asian: 0.12%
  - Native American: 0.09%
- Socio-economic indicators
  - At-Risk: 74.27%
  - Free Lunch: 68.44%
  - Reduced Lunch: 5.83%

== See also ==
- List of school districts in Louisiana
