= Mount Hermon High School =

High school in Washington Parish, Louisiana, United States

Location
- 36119 Highway 38; Mount Hermon, (Washington Parish), Louisiana 70450; United States
- Coordinates: 30.9570°N 90.2949°W

Information
- Type: Public high school
- School district: Washington Parish School Board
- Principal: Stacy Bond
- Staff: 30.58 (FTE)
- Enrollment: 373 (2024-2025)
- Student to teacher ratio: 12.20
- Colors: Gold and black
- Mascot: Yellow jacket
- Nickname: Yellow Jackets

Mount Hermon High School is located in Mount Hermon, Louisiana, United States. The high school is currently housed out of the same facility as the Mount Hermon elementary and junior high schools. The first Mount Hermon School, constructed in the mid-19th century, held classes in a log cabin near the Mount Hermon Cemetery. A new building was constructed for the school in 1885, and that structure is currently located in the Mile Branch Settlement at the Washington Parish Fairgrounds.

== Overview ==
At Mt. Hermon School, the student body makeup is 52 percent male and 48 percent female, and the total minority enrollment is 34 percent. Mt. Hermon School is 1 of 3 high schools in the Washington Parish.

== Notable alumni ==
- Lionel Ott, former member of the Louisiana State Senate and the last New Orleans finance commissioner
- Yun Young-sun (minister), USA name was Allen Yun. South Korean politicians. Agriculture and Forestry Minister of South Korea, in 1950.

== See also ==
- Washington Parish School Board
