= Calvin, Louisiana =

- Village
- Village of Calvin
- Location of Calvin in Winn Parish, Louisiana.

- Location of Louisiana in the United States
- Coordinates: 31°57′42″N 92°46′33″W
- Country: United States
- State: Louisiana
- Parish: Winn

Area
  - Total: 2.29 sq mi (5.94 km^{2})
  - Land: 2.29 sq mi (5.94 km^{2})
  - Water: 0 sq mi (0.00 km^{2})
- Elevation: 161 ft (49 m)

Population (2020)
  - Total: 242
  - Density: 105.5/sq mi (40.75/km^{2})
- Time zone: UTC-6 (CST)
  - Summer (DST): UTC-5 (CDT)
- Area code: 318
- FIPS code: 22-11930
- GNIS feature ID: 2407425

Calvin is a village in Winn Parish, Louisiana, United States. As of the 2020 census, Calvin had a population of 242.

== Geography ==
According to the United States Census Bureau, the village has a total area of 2.3 square miles (6.0 km^{2}), all land.

== Demographics ==
Historical population
Census	Pop.	Note	%±
1960	232		—
1970	286		23.3%
1980	263		−8.0%
1990	207		−21.3%
2000	236		14.0%
2010	238		0.8%
2020	242		1.7%
2025 (est.)	267	▲	10.3%
U.S. Decennial Census

As of the census of 2000, there were 236 people, 93 households, and 69 families residing in the village. The population density was 103.2 inhabitants per square mile (39.8/km^{2}). There were 111 housing units at an average density of 48.5 per square mile (18.7/km^{2}). The racial makeup of the village was 77.97% White, 17.37% African American, 2.54% Native American, 0.85% Asian, and 1.27% from two or more races. Hispanic or Latino of any race were 0.42% of the population.

There were 93 households, out of which 31.2% had children under the age of 18 living with them, 52.7% were married couples living together, 18.3% had a female householder with no husband present, and 25.8% were non-families. 23.7% of all households were made up of individuals, and 10.8% had someone living alone who was 65 years of age or older. The average household size was 2.54 and the average family size was 3.03.

In the village, the population was spread out, with 27.1% under the age of 18, 8.1% from 18 to 24, 22.5% from 25 to 44, 28.4% from 45 to 64, and 14.0% who were 65 years of age or older. The median age was 37 years. For every 100 females, there were 95.0 males. For every 100 females age 18 and over, there were 93.3 males.

The median income for a household in the village was $24,750, and the median income for a family was $30,536. Males had a median income of $31,250 versus $13,750 for females. The per capita income for the village was $12,751. About 18.3% of families and 26.2% of the population were below the poverty line, including 35.8% of those under the age of eighteen and 46.9% of those 65 or over.

== Government and infrastructure ==
The U.S. Postal Service maintains the Calvin Post Office.

== Education ==
Students are within the Winn Parish School Board school district. Residents are assigned to Calvin High School, a PreK-12 school.

The Winn Parish Library maintains the Calvin Library Branch.
