= Grant Parish School Board =

School district in Louisiana, United States

Coordinates: 31.5214°N 92.6991°W

The Grant Parish School Board is an entity responsible for the operation of public schools in all of Grant Parish, Louisiana, United States. It is headquartered in the town of Colfax. The parish is named for Ulysses S. Grant (1822-1885), General-in-Chief of the United States Army / Union Army during the American Civil War (1861-1865) and later 18th President of the United States, served 1869–1877.

== Schools ==
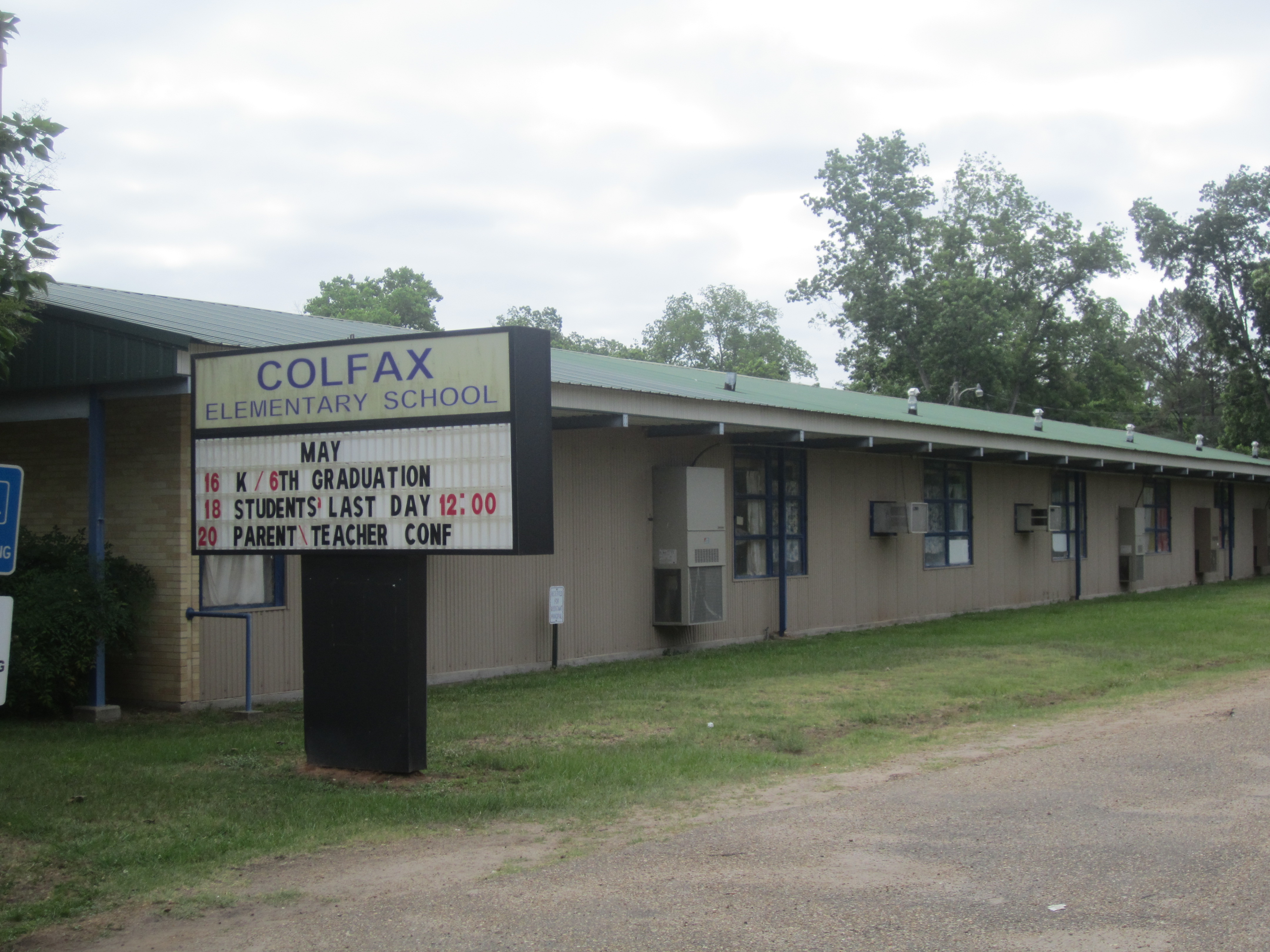
Colfax Elementary School

PK-12 Schools

- Georgetown High School (Georgetown)

Secondary schools

- Grades 7-12
  - Montgomery High School (Montgomery)
- Grades 9-12
  - Grant High School (Unincorporated area)
  - Grant Academy (Unincorporated area)
- Grades 7-8
  - Grant Junior High School (Dry Prong)

Primary schools (Grades PK-6)

- Colfax Elementary School (Colfax)
- Pollock Elementary School (Pollock)
- South Grant Elementary School (Unincorporated area)
- Verda Elementary School (Unincorporated area)

== Demographics ==
- Total Students (as of October 1, 2007): 3,422
- Gender
  - Male: 53%
  - Female: 47%
- Race/Ethnicity
  - White: 85.13%
  - African American: 13.35%
  - Hispanic: 0.67%
  - Native American: 0.44%
  - Asian: 0.41%
- Socio-Economic Indicators
  - At-Risk: 61.37%
  - Free Lunch: 49.85%
  - Reduced Lunch: 11.51%

== See also ==
- List of school districts in Louisiana
