= False River Academy =

Coordinates: 30.68821°N 91.45400°W

Location
- 201 Major Parkway; New Roads, Louisiana 70760; United States

Information
- Type: Private School
- Motto: Where Excellence meets Honor and Tradition
- Established: 1969
- CEEB code: 192214
- NCES School ID: 01650295
- Principal: Mary Horner
- Grades: Pre-K–12
- Enrollment: app. 339 (2026)
- Student to teacher ratio: 15.6
- Campus size: 22.57 acres (9.13 ha)
- Campus type: Suburban
- Colors: Maroon and gold
- Mascot: Gators
- Accreditations: Louisiana Board of Elementary and Secondary Education, Southern Association of Colleges and Schools
- Website: School website

False River Academy (commonly False River, or FRA) is a nonsectarian private school located in New Roads, Louisiana, in Pointe Coupee Parish. It serves grades Pre-K through 12. The school is independent, and has its own school board. Its enrollment is drawn from Pointe Coupee and surrounding parishes. It is one of two private schools and one of three high schools in the parish.

It was founded as a segregation academy in 1969. Its first non-white students enrolled in the late 1990s. In 2005, somewhat more students of ethnic minorities enrolled after Hurricane Katrina displaced them from the New Orleans area. As of 2014, the school was 96% white. In 2022, the school was 75% white in a city and parish that were 60% and 35% Black, respectively, in the most recent census.

During the 2013-2014 school year, the school had 483 students and 29.4 classroom teachers (on an FTE basis), for a student-teacher ratio of 15.6:1.

== History ==
False River Academy Campus in 1969

False River Academy was founded in the summer of 1969 as a segregation academy by white residents of Pointe Coupee and surrounding parishes, who were upset by desegregation. Although segregation academies were forced to eliminate explicitly racial admissions policies in the 1970s, all of False River's students were white until the late 1990s. In 2018, the student body was more than 84% white. As part of an effort to increase diversity, the school offers several minority scholarships.

When the school was founded, it operated in temporary buildings on the edge of a sugar cane field in New Roads a short distance from False River. The school took its name from this nearby ox-bow lake. At the time, it was one of nine high schools located in Pointe Coupee Parish. Permanent brick buildings and a gymnasium were added in the 1970s as the school grew.

The school is accredited by the Louisiana Board of Elementary and Secondary Education (BESE), and holds membership in Louisiana Citizens for Educational Freedom. In 2012, the school became accredited by the Southern Association of Colleges and Schools Council on Accreditation and School Improvement (SACS CASI).

Beginning in 2015, the school began offering dual enrollment courses for college credit. The dual enrollment courses offered include: College Algebra, Trigonometry, Chemistry, English, Social Studies, and Spanish. Credit for the courses can be earned with Louisiana State University, Southeastern Louisiana University, Franciscan Missionaries of Our Lady University or Northwestern State University.

== Student body ==
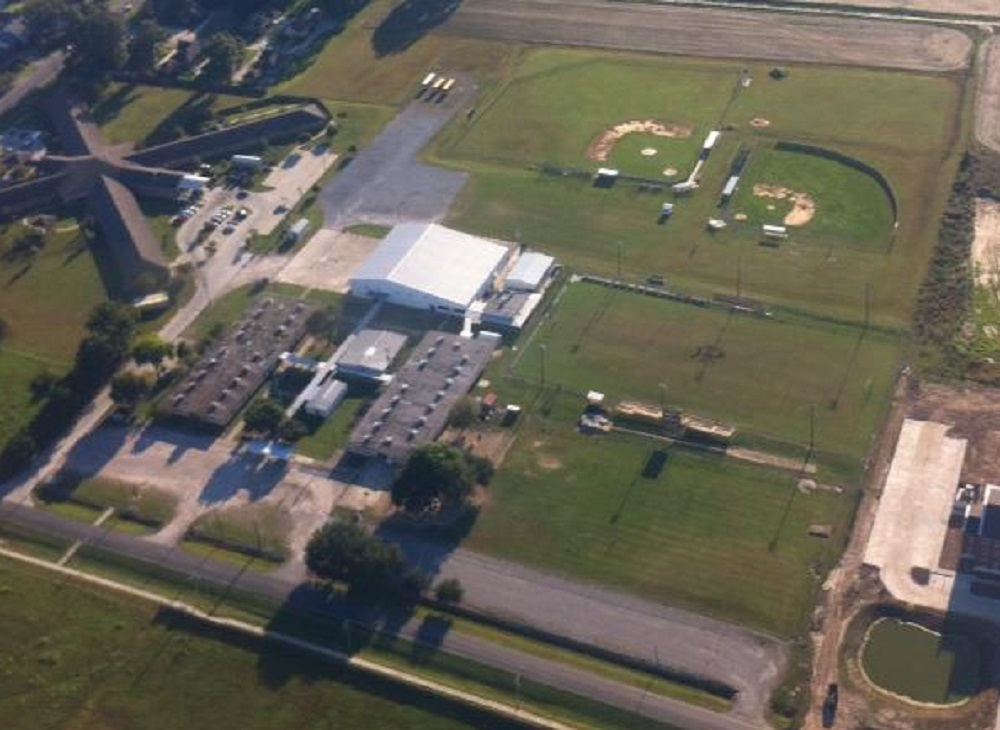
False River Academy in October 2013

Students live in the local New Roads area, Pointe Coupee Parish, and surrounding parishes.

The school enrolls students in grades pre-kindergarten through 12th grade.

During the 2005 and 2006 school years, many students arrived from New Orleans-area schools destroyed by Hurricane Katrina. During this time, the school had its largest number of ethnic minority students than any time prior.

In 2010, the average composite ACT score for the school was 21.6, second among the parish's four high schools, according to a Pointe Coupee Parish Chamber of Commerce Report that cited Louisiana Department of Education data.

=== Demographics ===
In the 2022-2023 school year, the demographic breakdown of the school's students was:

- Male - 45.1%
- Female - 54.9%
- Native American/Alaskan - 0.4%
- Asian/Pacific Islander - 0.0%
- African American - 23.4%
- Hispanic - 1.2%
- White - 75.0%
- Multiracial - 0%
- Not Specified - 0.0%

== Academics ==
False River Academy offers courses designed to meet the requirements for high school graduation set forth by the Louisiana Board of Elementary and Secondary Education, as well as the requirements for Louisiana's TOPS Opportunity Award college scholarship program.

The school is part of a vocational training program where students may take courses at a nearby satellite campus of Baton Rouge Community College for high school credit. In addition, it is also part of dual enrollment programs with Louisiana State University, Southeastern Louisiana University, Franciscan Missionaries of Our Lady University, and Northwestern State University. In these dual enrollment programs, students in grades 11 and 12 may elect to take college level courses that are counted for both high school and college credit simultaneously.

== Extracurricular activities ==
The extracurricular activities include a Student Council, Spanish Club; and chapters of national organizations, such as the Beta Club, Junior Beta Club, Fellowship of Christian Athletes (FCA), Students Against Destructive Decisions (SADD), and 4-H Club. Service organizations such as Key Club coexist alongside clubs which have a primarily social or recreational purpose. Other extracurricular activities include cheerleading, and a dance team known as the Gatorettes. Journalism students produce and edit a school newspaper, the Gator Gazette, and the school yearbook, the Gator Tale.

== Athletics ==
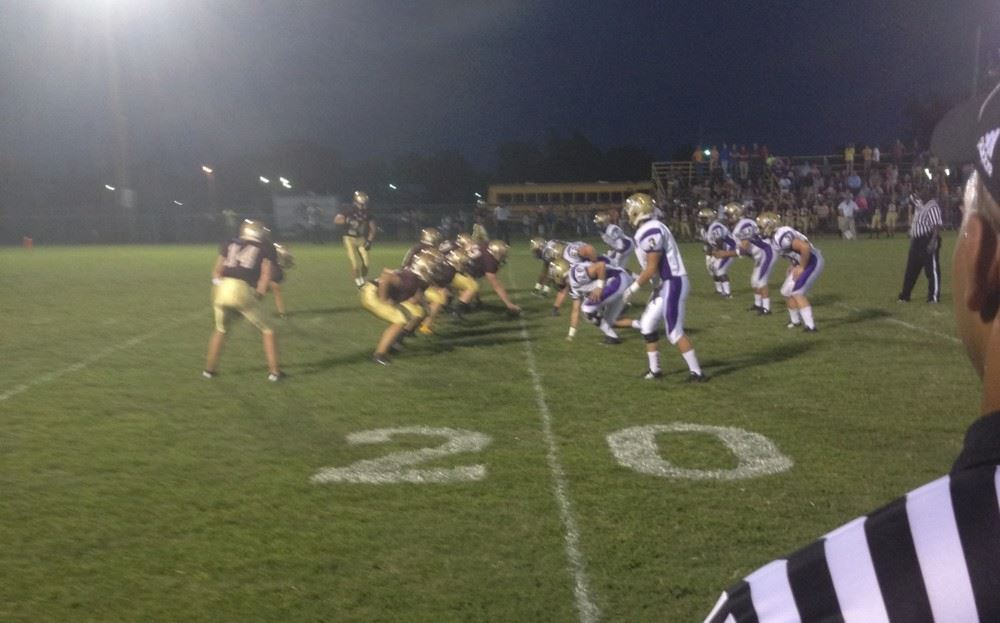
Photo of play during a False River Academy home football game against Ascension Catholic High School on September 26, 2014.

False River Academy is a member of the Louisiana High School Athletic Association (LHSAA) and has been competing in this league since 1991. The school competed as a Class single 'A' member of the LHSAA from 1991-2024. In 2024, the school moved to a Class C classification within the LHSAA. Prior to LHSAA membership in 1991, the school competed in the Louisiana Independent School Association (LISA).

The school competes in the following sports:

- Football
- Baseball
- Basketball
- Softball
- Track & Field
- Cross-country
- Volleyball
- Power Lifting
- Cheerleading

=== Championships ===
Football championships

- (1) LISA Football State Championship: 1989

Baseball championships

- (1) LISA Baseball State Championship: 1991

Basketball championships

- (2) LISA Boys' basketball State Championships: 1977, 1978

Boys' Cross Country championships

- (1) LHSAA Cross Country State Championship: 1995

Boys' Powerlifting championships

- (4) LHSAA Boys' Powerlifting State Championships: 1999, 2000, 2010, 2015

Girls' Powerlifting championships

- (3) LHSAA Girls' Powerlifting State Championships: 2006, 2007, 2010

Softball championships

- (2) LISA Softball State Championships: 1987, 1989

The softball team was LHSAA state runner-up in 2018.

== See also ==
List of Louisiana state high school football champions
