= Dodson, Louisiana =

- Village
- Village of Dodson
- Location of Dodson in Winn Parish, Louisiana.

- Location of Louisiana in the United States
- Coordinates: 32°04′51″N 92°39′31″W
- Country: United States
- State: Louisiana
- Parish: Winn

Area
  - Total: 2.25 sq mi (5.84 km^{2})
  - Land: 2.25 sq mi (5.84 km^{2})
  - Water: 0 sq mi (0.00 km^{2})
- Elevation: 259 ft (79 m)

Population (2020)
  - Total: 294
  - Density: 130.5/sq mi (50.37/km^{2})
- Time zone: UTC-6 (CST)
  - Summer (DST): UTC-5 (CDT)
- Area code: 318
- FIPS code: 22-21170
- GNIS feature ID: 2407441
- Website: dodson.myruralwater.com

Dodson is a village in Winn Parish, Louisiana, United States. As of the 2020 census, Dodson had a population of 294.

== Geography ==
According to the United States Census Bureau, the village has a total of area 2.2 square miles (5.7 km^{2}), all land.

== Demographics ==
Historical population
Census	Pop.	Note	%±
1910	845		—
1920	410		−51.5%
1930	436		6.3%
1940	442		1.4%
1950	375		−15.2%
1960	512		36.5%
1970	457		−10.7%
1980	469		2.6%
1990	350		−25.4%
2000	357		2.0%
2010	337		−5.6%
2020	294		−12.8%
2025 (est.)	337	▲	14.6%
U.S. Decennial Census

As of the census of 2000, there were 357 people, 140 households, and 102 families residing in the village. The population density was 158.4 inhabitants per square mile (61.2/km^{2}). There were 167 housing units at an average density of 74.1 per square mile (28.6/km^{2}). The racial makeup of the village was 75.07% White, 22.41% African American, 0.28% Native American, and 2.24% from two or more races. Hispanic or Latino of any race were 2.80% of the population.

There were 140 households, out of which 29.3% had children under the age of 18 living with them, 54.3% were married couples living together, 12.9% had a female householder with no husband present, and 27.1% were non-families. 24.3% of all households were made up of individuals, and 12.1% had someone living alone who was 65 years of age or older. The average household size was 2.55 and the average family size was 3.03.

In the village, the population was spread out, with 28.6% under the age of 18, 7.3% from 18 to 24, 24.1% from 25 to 44, 27.5% from 45 to 64, and 12.6% who were 65 years of age or older. The median age was 36 years. For every 100 females, there were 100.6 males. For every 100 females age 18 and over, there were 90.3 males.

The median income for a household in the village was $25,536, and the median income for a family was $30,625. Males had a median income of $29,000 versus $21,250 for females. The per capita income for the village was $10,452. About 19.2% of families and 29.9% of the population were below the poverty line, including 46.7% of those under age 18 and 11.5% of those age 65 or over.

== Government and infrastructure ==
The U.S. Postal Service maintains the Dodson Post Office.

== Education ==
Students are within the Winn Parish School Board school district. Residents are assigned to Dodson High School, a PreK-12 school.

The Winn Parish Library maintains the Dodson Library Branch.

== Reputation as a speed trap ==
Dodson has a long-standing reputation as a notorious speed trap, with more than half of its revenue generated by traffic citations with a total of $717 in citation revenue per resident, the fourth highest in the state. Dodson was cited in a state audit in 2007 for issuing excessive speeding violations.

== Notable people ==
- Harley Bozeman, Winn Parish state representative from 1928 to 1929, spent part of his boyhood in Dodson
