= Lakeview Junior-Senior High School (Louisiana) =

Lakeview Junior/Senior High School
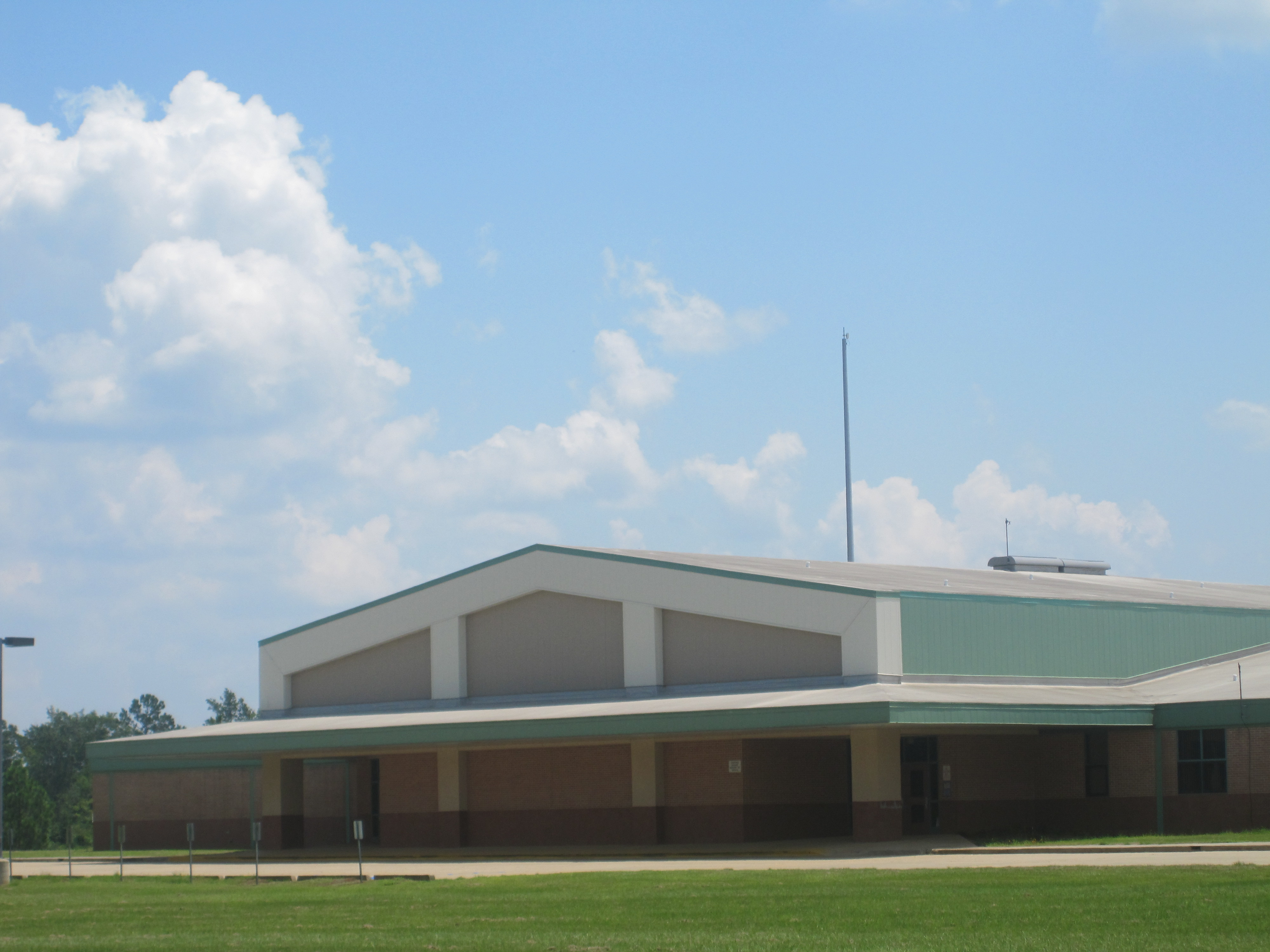
- Lakeview Junior/Senior High school in August 2009

Location
- 7305 Highway 9 Campti, (Natchitoches Parish), Louisiana 71411; United States; 31.9239°N 93.0883°W

Information
- Type: Public high school
- School district: Natchitoches Parish School Board
- Principal: Chase Stepp
- Staff: 29.95 (FTE)
- Enrollment: 301 (2023-2024)
- Student to teacher ratio: 10.05
- Colors: Green, orange, and white
- Mascot: Gators
- Website: www.npsb.la/o/lv

Lakeview Junior-Senior High School is a public secondary school, serving junior and senior high school grades, in Campti, Louisiana, United States. It is a part of the Natchitoches Parish School Board.

It is located east of Campti on Louisiana Highway 9. The school is 55 percent white in enrollment, drawing students from around the parish. Students from as far north as Ashland attend Lakeview.

== Athletics ==
Lakeview Senior High athletics competes in the LHSAA.
