= East Feliciana Public Schools =

School district in Louisiana, United States

Coordinates: 30.862°N 91.013°W

East Feliciana Public Schools is a school district headquartered in Clinton, Louisiana, United States. The district serves students in East Feliciana Parish.

== School uniforms ==
The district requires all students to wear school uniforms.

== Schools ==
=== High school (Grades 9-12) ===
- East Feliciana High School (Jackson)

Principal: Candace Bailey

=== Middle school (Grades 7-8) ===
- East Feliciana Middle School (Clinton)

Principal: Kimberly Jackson

=== Elementary schools (Grades Pre-K-6) ===
- Clinton Elementary School (Clinton)

Principal: Casey Edwards

- Jackson Elementary School (Jackson)

Principal: Megan Phillips

- Slaughter Elementary School (Slaughter)

Principal: Jennifer Thornton

=== Alternative programs ===
- East Feliciana Enrichment Academy (Clinton)

Principal: Ella Philson

- East Feliciana STEAM Academy (6th-8th Grade)(Clinton)

Principal: Kenyetta Washington

=== Charter school (Grades 7-12) ===
- Slaughter Community Charter School (Slaughter)

Principal: Stephanie Goudeau

== School culture ==
In 2010, State Superintendent of Education Paul Pastorek led staff and school board members from the Saint Helena Parish School Board on a bus tour that included stops at Jackson Elementary School and East Feliciana Middle School. The purpose of the tour was to help Saint Helena replicate the success of what Pastorek described as "high-quality, high-performing schools."

In December 2014, local television station WBRZ further recognized the outstanding climate and culture of East Feliciana Public Schools when they highlighted Jackson Elementary School as a WBRZ "Cool School."

In October 2021, the Louisiana Department of Education recognized East Feliciana Public Schools' EF Accelerate Summer Learning Program as a Model of Excellence. Later that year, three East Feliciana Public Schools teachers were among eight educators statewide recognized as Exemplary Educators by the Louisiana Department of Education In 2024, two additional educators earned the same recognition, cementing East Feliciana Public Schools as the state's most-recognized district for this honor.

Statewide recognitions of the district's commitment to the whole child continued in 2024 when Slaughter Elementary was one of just eight schools statewide recognized by the Louisiana Department of Education with the Louisiana School Physical Activity Award.

== Student achievement ==
During the 2012-13 school year, East Feliciana Public Schools ranked second in the state in proficiency growth on the 3rd-8th grade Louisiana Educational Assessment Program (LEAP) and integrated Louisiana Educational Assessment Program (iLEAP) spring assessments.

During the 2016-17 school year, East Feliciana Public Schools ranked first in the state among all school districts for growth in ACT scores.

== Notable graduates ==
- Kendell Beckwith
- Danny Johnson (American football)
