= East Beauregard High School =

Location
- 5364 Highway 113; Dry Creek, (Beauregard Parish), Louisiana 70634; United States; 30.7447°N 93.0266°W

Information
- Type: Public high school
- Established: 1962
- School district: Beauregard Parish School Board
- Principal: Jason Anderson
- Staff: 33.93 (FTE)
- Enrollment: 430 (2023-2024)
- Student to teacher ratio: 12.67
- Colors: Columbia blue and red
- Athletics conference: District 5-1A
- Nickname: Trojans

East Beauregard High School (EBHS) is a public school located in Dry Creek, Louisiana, a rural, unincorporated area of Beauregard Parish, Louisiana, United States.

== History ==
Formal education in the piney, sparsely populated eastern portions of Beauregard Parish, then a part of Imperial Calcasieu Parish, began to take shape with the close of the American Civil War. In 1865, a Baptist minister, B.J. Ford, began holding school in a log-cabin near the Smyrna community, approximately 5 miles northwest of Sugartown.

Several years later, a co-educational academy at Sugartown came and went before, in the last decade of the 19th century, another school was built in Sugartown which lasted until 1909 when the first two-story schoolhouse in the area was built. The original Sugartown School building built in the 1890s burned to the ground not long thereafter.

An angry farmer destroyed the first school in the Dry Creek area, blaming boys from the school for frightening his hogs. A new school was erected near the Dry Creek Bridge before being sold to the Dry Creek Methodist Church in 1910. In that year, a six-room, two-story schoolhouse was built out of virgin, longleaf pine and painted white. Locals called the building "The White House" after its brilliant paint job.

High schools at Sugartown and Dry Creek developed separately until the early 1960s, when the Beauregard Parish School Board acted on a report generated by the George Peabody College for Teachers which stated that a consolidated high school was needed in the area.

In 1961, the Beauregard Parish School Board purchased land along Highway 113 between Sugartown and Dry Creek and began construction on a new consolidated high school for the eastern part of the parish.

East Beauregard High School opened in September 1962 with an enrollment of 446 students in grades 1–12. Frank Hennigan served as the consolidated high school's first principal.

The original "White House" school building was later purchased by the Dry Creek Baptist Camp and was used as a meeting hall and retreat space for Baptists across Southwest Louisiana. The building burned to the ground on the afternoon of February 17, 2021. Investigators with the Beauregard Parish Sheriff's Office suspected that lightning from thunderstorms in the area at the time of the fire potentially caused the blaze.

== Athletics ==
The East Beauregard Trojans currently compete in District 5-1A of the Louisiana High School Athletic Association.

=== State championships ===
Girls' basketball

- (4) 1974, 1986, 1989, 1990

=== State runners-up ===
Boys' basketball

- (2) 1969, 1984

Girls' basketball

- (6) 1972, 1980, 1982, 1983, 1987, 1988
