= Loranger =

Loranger is a surname. Notable people with the surname include:

- Del Loranger (1920–2003), American basketball player and coach
- Diane Loranger (1920–2004), Canadian geologist and paleontologist
- Donna Loranger, American politician
- Louis-Onésime Loranger (1837–1917), Canadian lawyer, politician and judge
- Thomas-Jean-Jacques Loranger (1823–1885), Canadian judge and politician

== See also ==
- Loranger, Michigan, a former community
  - Edward Loranger House
