= Merryville High School =

Location
- 7061 Highway 110 West; Merryville, (Beauregard Parish), Louisiana 70653; United States; 30.7467°N 93.5370°W

Information
- Type: Public high school
- School district: Beauregard Parish School Board
- Principal: Kara Wynn
- Staff: 40.54 (FTE)
- Enrollment: 496 (2023-24)
- Student to teacher ratio: 12.23
- Colors: Maroon and white
- Mascot: Panther
- Nickname: Panthers
- Website: mhs.beau.k12.la.us

Merryville High School is a K-12 school located in the town of Merryville, Louisiana. It is part of the Beauregard Parish School Board district and is one of 14 schools in Beauregard Parish.

Kara Wynn serves as the principal, and Scott Cornes serves as the Assistant Principal.

== Students ==
The graduation rate for Merryville High School stands at 97%, surpassing the Beauregard Parish overall graduation rate of 93.9%. Among the 478 students, 48% are female and 52% are male. 16% of the students are minorities, primarily African American, which is below the state average of 54%. There are 41 full-time teachers currently instructing at the school. The student-to-teacher ratio is 12:1, a ratio that has remained consistent for five years. In comparison, the Louisiana average student-to-teacher ratio is 16:1.

== Athletics ==
Merryville High athletics competes in the LHSAA. The team mascot is a black Panther.

Sports sponsored include football, softball, baseball, and basketball.

Football
The football field at Merryville High School is named Keener-Cagle Stadium in honor of Christian Keener, a former Methodist church bishop and Chris Cagle. Currently head coach is Bryan Barbay.

=== State Championships ===
Baseball

- (1) 2018

Softball

- (3) 1986, 1992, 2005

Basketball (Girls)

- 1 (2026)

== Notable people ==
- Chris Cagle was an All-American football player at the United States Military Academy and spent time in the NFL as a player and coach in the 1930s and was inducted into the College Football Hall of Fame in 1954.
