= Dry Creek, Louisiana =

- Unincorporated community
- Hamlet of Dry Creek
- Interactive map of Dry Creek, Louisiana
- Coordinates: 30°40′09″N 93°02′44″W
- Country: United States
- State: Louisiana
- Parish: Beauregard
- Elevation: 98 ft (30 m)
- Time zone: UTC-6 (Central (CST))
  - Summer (DST): UTC-5 (CDT)
- ZIP code: 70637
- Area code: 337
- GNIS feature ID: 554268

Dry Creek is a rural unincorporated community in the east-central portion of Beauregard Parish, Louisiana, United States. It lies 20 miles (32 km) southeast of DeRidder on the corner of Louisiana highways 113 and 394.

The geography of the area is slightly hilly, ranging from 80 to 135 feet (24 to 41 m) above sea level, consisting of mostly sandy soils with many creeks (not all dry) and ponds.

Dry Creek is at the beginning of the "piney woods" of central Louisiana. Logging is the major industry in the area. The area is locally noted for Sugartown melons.

The Mayor is Rob Carnahan

== Areas of interest ==
Bundick Lake is located approximately 5 miles (8.0 km) north/northwest of "downtown" Dry Creek.

Dry Creek Baptist Camp is located at the corner of the two highways across from the only grocery store in the community, with a Pentecostal Church on the north side and a Bible Church on the south side of its boundary.

== Education ==
Dry Creek is a part of the Beauregard Parish School Board. Children in the area attend East Beauregard Elementary School and East Beauregard High School, 5 miles (8.0 km) north.

== History ==
=== Historic buildings ===
Referred to as the "White House", the Dry Creek School, owned by Dry Creek Baptist Camp, was an imposing neo-Greco building. Built in 1912, the wings and columns of the building were added in 1919–1920. The school closed in 1962 when the Sugartown school and the Dry Creek school consolidated into East Beauregard School. The building was listed on the National Register of Historic Places in 1988. The building caught fire and burned to the ground on February 17, 2021.

=== Early history ===
Although no longer existing, the Dry Creek sawmill was built in 1841 for the expressed purpose of supplying lumber for doors and furnishings of the first Calcasieu Parish courthouse, was located on Mill Bayou, about one-fourth mile south of the current Dry Creek Cemetery. Both the sawmill site and Dry Creek Cemetery are located near a trail connecting Lake Charles to Natchitoches and used as a mail route between Lake Charles, Sugartown, and Vernon Parish communities in the 1840s. Legend has it that the first burial in Dry Creek Cemetery occurred in 1860 or 1861 and was an eleven or twelve-year-old girl whose family was traveling through the area and buried her by a small young cedar tree in a pasture area near the trail. Some believe the old trail runs through the middle of the cemetery and slightly east of the cedar tree. The Spears family (L.D. Spears, Sr.) came to Dry Creek in the 1870s, bought federally-owned property including the site of the cemetery, and established the Dry Creek Cemetery (formerly Spears Cemetery) as a community cemetery in 1880. It is believed that L.D. Spears, Sr., gave permission for Ella Burnett, the infant niece of Lucy Cooper (discussed later), to be buried near the cedar tree in 1880. During the early years of Dry Creek, the Lindsey Cemetery, established in 1861, recorded several 1860s and 1870s burials. Thomas Williams, founder of Dry Creek, and his wife are believed to be buried somewhere on the original William Hanchey property, formerly Williams' homestead. Williams and his wife died in the 1850s, and their children left Dry Creek before 1860.

The historic sawmill was built by Williams, who was considered the first settler of Dry Creek in the 1830s and first police juror of Ward 7 (Sugartown Ward) of Imperial Calcasieu Parish, created in 1840 from St. Landry Parish. The Hanchey family is said to have acquired Williams' property years after his death in latter half of 1850s. The Hanchey family settled in Dry Creek between 1861 and 1865. Sources indicate that the Hanchey family may have lived in the Topsy area near Marsh Bayou for a short period of time before moving to Dry Creek, probably in early 1860s. Another notable family that owned and operated Dry Creek sawmill was Robert Campbell father of James Emory Campbell, who were early Scottish settlers that immigrated in the mid 1800s. The Campbell family is especially known for bringing folk country music to the area. Julian Campbell grandson of Robert and, son to James passed down the family’s style of guitar finger picking where it is still played to this day.

=== Beginning of Dry Creek Cemetery: what records indicate ===
The Hanchey, associated Pate and Bradford families, and Cooper family came to northern Vernon from Holmes County, Florida (along the Florida and Alabama boundary), at the same time in 1860 (1850 Fl. Census records and 1860 La. Census records). The 1860 Census records these families living in neighboring houses northeast of Leesville near the intersection of two trails (one from Natchitoches to Lake Charles and another extending from Cotile Landing (present-day Boyce), a steamboat landing on the Red River, to East Texas. Census records and Turner genealogy also show that Edith Crumpler Cooper, mother of Lucy, had family members living in the same northern Vernon area since 1852 (three sisters married to the Turners who later moved to present-day Allen Parish and a brother). The Turners and Crumpler sisters and brother lived in Holmes County, Florida, before they took a long journey by wagon to Louisiana in 1852. Also, there is mention in genealogy of the Hanchey family that ancestors traveled by boat from Mobile to Louisiana. It is likely that all four of these families may have been traveling together and may have continued to travel southward by wagon through Dry Creek in the summer of 1860 (July or August) on their way to Marsh Bayou, northeast of Lake Charles. Several old Hanchey obituaries (over 100 years old) indicate the family first settled a few miles northeast of Lake Charles near the Calcasieu River in 1860. Although this is only speculation, one Hanchey family member believes that there is some connection to the girl buried under the cedar tree. The grave by the cedar is in the center of the original Cooper family plot with marked graves dating back to the 1880s on three sides, and appears to be the grave of an 11 to 12-year-old girl described in the legend and identified in 1860 Census records of the Cooper family as Lucy Ann Cooper, approximately 12 years of age. It is not known if the Cooper family remained long at Marsh Bayou or returned to northern Vernon, as tax and property records for these areas were destroyed by the burning of Alexandria during the Civil War and the Lake Charles Fire in the early 1900s, but Property Tax Records of Angelina County, Texas, show that the family lived in Angelina County, Texas (Lufkin area) after the Civil War (1866-1873), then returning to Dry Creek. All four families returned to Dry Creek, and many were buried within the shade or sight of the now ancient cedar tree, estimated to be 162–178 years old, a witness tree to the long history of Dry Creek.

=== One of the oldest communities in Beauregard Parish ===
Both the Lindsey and Dry Creek cemeteries in the community recorded their first burials in 1860-61 and are still used today. The first church/school was said to have been built in 1860. The 1860-61 time period records developments indicating the beginning of a community. Dry Creek is one of the oldest communities in Beauregard Parish. Sugartown (1820s) is the oldest, and the Hopewell community established a church and cemetery in the 1850s, with the first log church erected near Dollar Branch in 1852. Other than the Williams family whose members were either deceased or had left the community by the late 1850s, the Iles, Lindsey, and Miller families were the first to live in Dry Creek before 1860 (late 1850s). One source on Lindsey family genealogy lists 1859 as the year the Lindsey and Miller families came to Dry Creek from north Louisiana. The 1860 Census records of Imperial Calcasieu Parish do confirm that these three families were living in Dry Creek in the summer of 1860.
