= Campti, Louisiana =

- Town
- Town of Campti
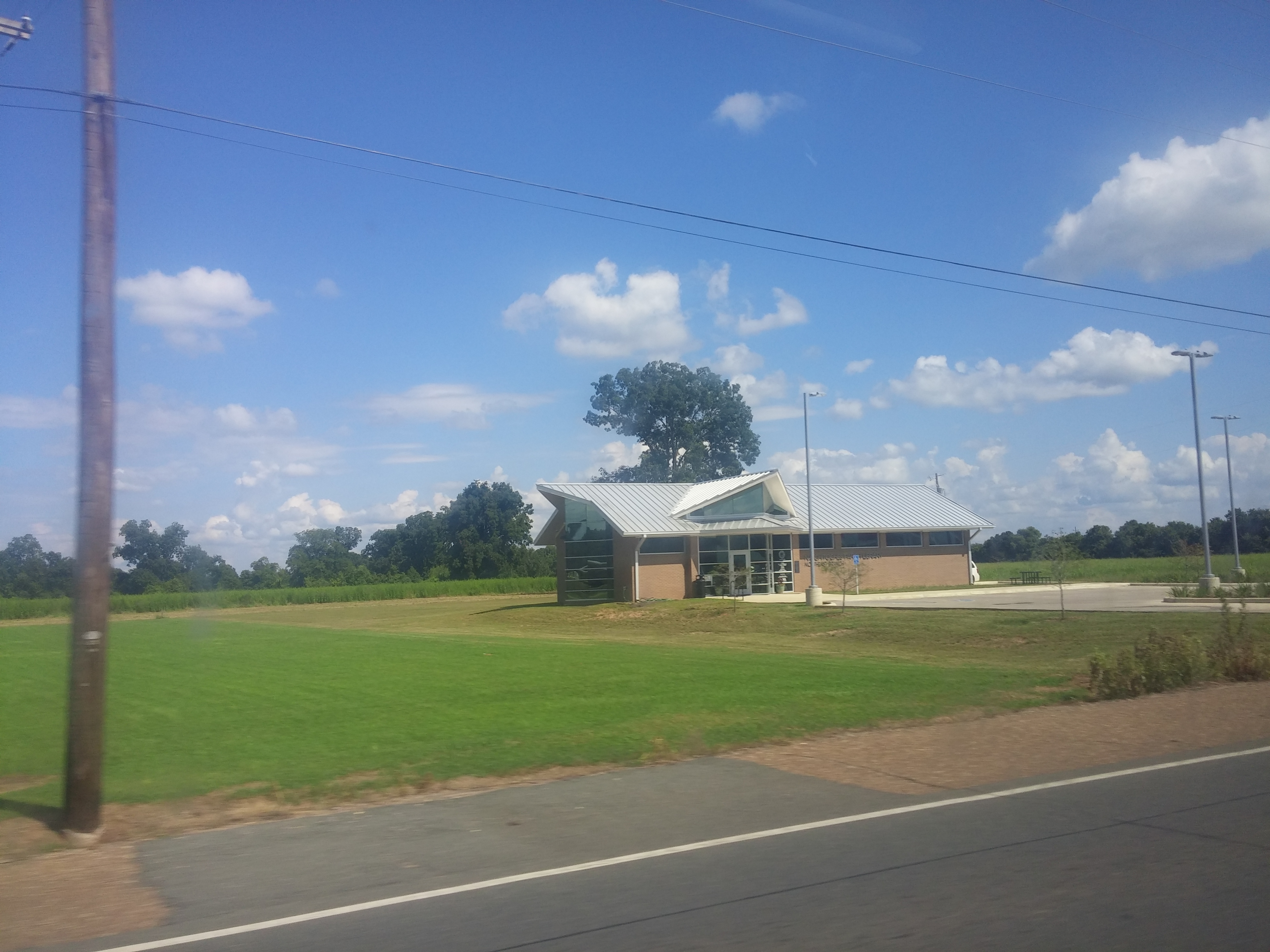
- Natchitoches Parish Library off Hwy 71/84

- Location of Campti in Natchitoches Parish, Louisiana.

- Location of Louisiana in the United States
- Coordinates: 31°53′50″N 93°07′18″W
- Country: United States
- State: Louisiana
- Parish: Natchitoches
- Founded: 1745
- Incorporated as a village: 1857

Government
  - Mayor: Katrina Evans (D)

Area
  - Total: 1.04 sq mi (2.70 km^{2})
  - Land: 1.04 sq mi (2.70 km^{2})
  - Water: 0 sq mi (0.00 km^{2})
- Elevation: 144 ft (44 m)

Population (2020)
  - Total: 887
  - Density: 851.5/sq mi (328.75/km^{2})
- Time zone: UTC-6 (CST)
  - Summer (DST): UTC-5 (CDT)
- ZIP Code: 71411
- Area code: 318
- FIPS code: 22-12280
- GNIS feature ID: 2405373

Campti is a town in the northern part of Natchitoches Parish, Louisiana, United States. As of the 2020 census, Campti had a population of 887. It is part of the Natchitoches Micropolitan Statistical Area. Campti is a flat area of mostly farmland. It is located on the eastern bank of the Red River. Considerable herds of cattle are also raised in the general area.

== Etymology ==
Tradition maintains that the name "Campti" was derived from the name of a Natchitoches Indian chief, known to the French colonists as "Le Roi Campti" (The King Campti). Church records in Natchitoches show that a French missionary, Père Valentin, visited the community of Campti around 1745. This was the first written record of Campti during the period of French Louisiana.

== History ==
The rural parish was developed for large cotton plantations, and a majority of the population were enslaved African Americans in the antebellum years. But by the time of the American Civil War, a number of free people of color also lived in Campti and the area. They were known to be related to several of the longtime white families, who acknowledged them, and they were generally well accepted. According to one authority on this area, they lived nearly as white. At least nine men of color, and likely more, enlisted in the Confederate Army during the Civil War and "easily entered a predominately white military company."

During the war, Union Brigadier-General A. J. Smith, with two brigades, reached Campti to assist Rear-Admiral David D. Porter's gunboats on the Red River there. Confederate Brigadier-General St. John R. Liddell's scattered troops had been harassing the Union fleet but quickly retreated as Smith's overwhelming force arrived on April 13, 1864. Smith and his men burned what was left of Campti, on April 14, 1864. The gunboats were returned safely upriver to Grand Ecore in Natchitoches Parish.

In the postwar years, cotton and agriculture continued as mainstays of the economy. Later cattle raising was introduced. Large-scale agriculture and ranching have reduced economic opportunities in the rural area. The population of Campti has continued to be majority African American, reflecting the history of its development. The City of Campti also serves as the tribal headquarters of the Natchitoches Tribe of Louisiana.

== Geography ==
According to the United States Census Bureau, the town has a total area of 1.0 square mile (2.6 km^{2}), all land.

== Demographics ==
Historical population
Census	Pop.	Note	%±
1880	101		—
1890	310		206.9%
1910	664		—
1920	670		0.9%
1930	999		49.1%
1940	1,004		0.5%
1950	1,014		1.0%
1960	1,045		3.1%
1970	1,078		3.2%
1980	1,069		−0.8%
1990	929		−13.1%
2000	1,057		13.8%
2010	1,056		−0.1%
2020	887		−16.0%
2025 (est.)	879	▼	−0.9%
U.S. Decennial Census

=== 2020 census ===
Campti racial composition
Race	Number	Percentage
White (non-Hispanic)	157	17.7%
Black or African American (non-Hispanic)	679	76.55%
Native American	6	0.68%
Other/Mixed	32	3.61%
Hispanic or Latino	13	1.47%

As of the 2020 United States census, there were 887 people, 427 households, and 192 families residing in the town.

=== 2000 census ===
As of the census of 2000, there were 1,057 people, 385 households, and 269 families residing in the town. The population density was 1,080.2 inhabitants per square mile (417.1/km^{2}). There were 462 housing units at an average density of 472.1 per square mile (182.3/km^{2}). The racial makeup of the town was 24.88% White, 74.46% African American, 0.09% Native American, 0.28% from other races, and 0.28% from two or more races. Hispanic or Latino of any race were 0.85% of the population.

There were 385 households, out of which 42.9% had children under the age of 18 living with them, 30.4% were married couples living together, 35.3% had a female householder with no husband present, and 29.9% were non-families. 26.0% of all households were made up of individuals, and 6.2% had someone living alone who was 65 years of age or older. The average household size was 2.74 and the average family size was 3.36.

In the town, the population was spread out, with 38.5% under the age of 18, 8.5% from 18 to 24, 25.8% from 25 to 44, 18.0% from 45 to 64, and 9.2% who were 65 years of age or older. The median age was 27 years. For every 100 females, there were 81.9 males. For every 100 females age 18 and over, there were 75.2 males.

The median income for a household in the town was $14,844, and the median income for a family was $15,781. Males had a median income of $25,750 versus $14,000 for females. The per capita income for the town was $7,219. About 47.3% of families and 45.4% of the population were below the poverty line, including 55.9% of those under age 18 and 33.0% of those age 65 or over.

In 2010, Campti had the eighth-lowest median household income of all places in the United States with a population over 1,000. The town of Campti is 75 percent African American in population.

== Education ==
Natchitoches Parish School Board operates public schools, including Fairview Alpha Elementary School and Lakeview Junior-Senior High School.

Natchitoches Parish Library operates the Northeast Branch in Campti.

== Notable people ==
- Maxine Brown Russell, country singer, was born in Campti.
- Robert Hilburn, music journalist, spent his early childhood on a farm near Campti.

== See also ==
- Campti (YTB-816): ship named after the town
