= West Ouachita High School =

Location
- 4061 Caples Road; West Monroe, Louisiana; United States; 32.428°N 92.33676°W

Information
- Type: Public
- Established: 1989
- Principal: Rusty Farrar
- Teaching staff: 72.94 (FTE)
- Grades: 9 - 12
- Enrollment: 1,048 (2023-2024)
- Student to teacher ratio: 14.37
- Colors: Red and Blue
- Mascot: Chief
- Nickname: Chiefs
- Rival: Neville High School
- Yearbook: WOHS Legend
- Website: Official website

West Ouachita High School It is administered by the Ouachita Parish School Board, which ranks second out of sixty-six school systems in Louisiana. The school is located in unincorporated Ouachita Parish with a West Monroe address. It is fully accredited by the Southern Association of Colleges and Schools. The sports team's mascot is the Chief.

== History ==
When West Ouachita High School opened in the fall of 1989, it was an ultra-modern facility designed around a courtyard and amphitheater. Architects capitalized on the thirty-six acre sloping site to construct a multi-leveled building with 121,000 square feet (11,200 m^{2}) of heated area. The total cost amounted to eight million dollars. The library was equipped with a computerized service are and some 15,000 volumes. The athletic facilities are also modern and include a gymnasium, a football stadium, six tennis courts, an all-weather track, a baseball diamond, and a softball diamond.

Enrollment began with 720 students the first year, and the enrollment continues to increase to the present enrollment of 1152 students. Because of this increased enrollment, there was a need for more classrooms. Consequently, the Ouachita Parish School Board purchased an additional twenty-one acres of land and authorized an 11.5 million dollar expansion program which began in the summer of 2002 and was completed in the spring of 2003. This expansion included ten classrooms, an expanded main office area, an auditorium, a new room and practice area for its award-winning band, and a new athletic field house. In addition, the former athletic facilities were remodeled for the schools award-winning NJROTC and the old band room was remodeled for the expanding choir.

In 2009, the school expanded to include an Agricultural center and green house, and again in 2010, when a new turf football field was laid. Also, in 2011 the school added a new conference room.

In 2015, the school made plans to expand the campus again. This expansion includes a new 2-story state of the art gymnasium, 6 new tennis courts, and 2 new parking lots; all to accommodate the school's growing population. Completion is expected in 2017.

== Athletics ==
West Ouachita High athletics competes in the LHSAA.

=== Championships ===
In 2005, the Chiefs baseball team won the LHSAA 4A State Championship, defeating Northwood High School 11-3.

The Chiefs also hold 5 individual track and field State Championships. Of these were Jacob Heckford, winning the 4A Boys 800m run in 2009. In 2014, Andre Johnson, David Lee, Terrell Russell, and Gabriel Tumey took home the 4A Boys 1600m relay with a winning time of 3:21.87. In 2016, Corbin Wiley won the 4A Boys State Championship in the Javelin Throw. In 2026, Madison Boyd captured the Class 4A state title in the girls’ 300-meter hurdles, while Jack Kelley earned the Class 4A state championship in the boys’ 3200-meter run.

The 2026 track and field season proved to be one of the program’s most successful campaigns, highlighted by the boys team earning Class 4A state runner-up honors after capturing the Class 4A Region 1 championship and finishing first at the Class 4A District 2 championships alongside the girls team

== Notable alumni ==
- Zach Watson (Class of 2016) — outfielder for the LSU Tigers

== Notable faculty ==
- Leonard Griffin — former professional football player, defensive line coach

== See also ==
- List of high schools in Louisiana
