= Quitman High School (Louisiana) =

Location
- 181 Wolverine Drive; Quitman, Jackson Parish, Louisiana 71268; United States; 32.3457098°N 92.7204199°W

Information
- School type: Public school
- Motto: In hoc signo vinces (In this sign thou shalt conquer)
- Established: c. 1900
- School board: Jackson Parish School Board
- School district: Jackson Parish
- NCES School ID: 220078000556
- Principal: Chris Cavin
- Grades: PreK–12
- Enrollment: 737 (2023–2024)
  - Pre-kindergarten: 23
  - Kindergarten: 50
  - Grade 1: 51
  - Grade 2: 49
  - Grade 3: 68
  - Grade 4: 58
  - Grade 5: 49
  - Grade 6: 63
  - Grade 7: 61
  - Grade 8: 62
  - Grade 9: 55
  - Grade 10: 58
  - Grade 11: 35
  - Grade 12: 55
- Student to teacher ratio: 14.85
- Hours in school day: 392 Instructional minutes per day
- Campus size: 20 acres (8.1 ha)
- Campus type: Rural
- Colors: Blue and Yellow
- Nickname: Wolverines
- USNWR ranking: #202–307 in Louisiana
- National ranking: #13,383–17,843
- Website: qhs.jpsb.us

Quitman High School is an American primary and secondary school in Quitman, Louisiana, serving grades Pre-K through twelfth grade, and is one of two PreK–12 schools in the Jackson Parish School District, and one of three high schools in the district. The school opened c. 1900 as a public school.

== History ==
=== First school (Pre–1903) ===
The first school was built around the year 1900, but possibly dates back to as early as the mid-1800s and was a single room log building.

=== Second school (1903–1919) ===
When the railroad was built in Quitman, the post office and businesses were relocated to downtown Quitman, which included the relocation of the school, which moved into a small log building adjacent to the post office. The school at this time consisted of one teacher and approximately twenty-five students across eight grades.

During the 1906–1907 school year a two-room building with unlevel floors was built as an expansion for the school, and the number of grades taught expanded to ten. In 1907 the number of teachers increased to two, and though the specific teachers changed through each year, the number of teachers remained at two until 1914. In 1914 two additional rooms were built onto the school which doubled the amount of space in the school, and by the 1916–1917 school year there were approximately one hundred students and six teachers. Due to space constraints, two of the elementary teachers taught at a nearby Baptist church and a nearby Methodist church.

=== Third school (1920–1953) ===
A new three story brick building for the school was built in 1920 at a cost of $40,000, raised from a tax voted in by Quitman's citizens for the building of the school. The enrollment of the school in 1921 was approximately 150 and the number of grades taught had expanded to 11. In 1929 the enrollment in the school was 215, and in 1935 the school also had an enrollment of 215. By 1952 the enrollment was 284.

By the early 1920s, the school had a boys football team as well as boys and girls basketball teams, A baseball team that for the school was organized in 1922. A high school band was formed in 1937 and gave its first public performance the following year, in 1938.

A gymnasium was built in 1939 at a cost of $40,000, and the first lunch program was introduced to the school in 1943, with a dedicated lunch room built for $20,000 during the 1948–1949 school year and formally opened in 1950.

A school newspaper called The Blue and Gold Booster began during the 1950–1951 school year.

A severe storm caused significant damage to the school building in May 1953 and while initially it seemed as if the storm only blew out the windows and window frames of the third floor and damaged a stairwell, the building was later deemed unsafe for use.

The Jackson Parish School Board accepted a bid in August 1953 for the demolition of the damaged school building and accepted a bid in October 1953 for the construction of a new school.

=== Fourth school (1954–Present) ===
Construction began on the fourth and present building in late 1953 and was completed in 1954 as a single-story brick school on 20 acres (8.1 ha) of land at a cost of $142,000. Students used the school's gymnasium and another unused school building called the Ansley School during the construction of the new school. The new school was built in the same location was the previous school as reused the undamaged cafeteria and gymnasium that was previously used.

In November 1954, Quitman High School became a member of the Southern Association of Colleges and Schools (SACS), though is presently no longer accrediated through SACS or Cognia.

In 1964, Principal Clyde Aswell, who had at that point been the principal for fourteen years was asked by the school board via resolution to resign, a request mirrored by a petition of teachers at the school who stated that it was "very difficult to teach...with Mr. Aswell as principal" and asked that the principal be either transferred or removed from the high school. The school board passed a resolution on August 6, 1964 "charging him with willful neglect of duty" and on August 25, 1964 transferred him out of the position of principal of the school and into the position of Director of Guidance Services and Supervisor of Adult Education. Aswell filed a successful lawsuit, Clyde W. Aswell v. Jackson Parish School Board, against the school board which he also won on appeal, which forced the school board by mandamus to reinstate him as principal of the school in June 1965. In March 1966, Aswell left Quitman High School to become a teacher at Calhoun High School in Ouachita Parish and was replaced with a new principal.

== Academics ==
As of the 2020–2021 school year, the school had an enrollment of 724 students and 43 teachers for a student–teacher ratio of 16.78. 309 of the students were eligible for free school meals, while 23 were eligible for reduced-price meals. The graduation rate for the school year was 85%.

The per pupil expenditure for the 2020–2021 school year was $10,385 per student, compared to a statewide average of $11,708 per student.

== Extracurricular activities ==
There are several officially recognized clubs are Quitman High School:

- 4-H – The 4-H club at Quitman High School first began in 1928.
- National Beta Club
- Future Business Leaders of America – The school has had an FBLA chapter since 1964.
- Future Farmers of America – The school has had an FFA chapter since at least 1935.

Social clubs are not allowed at the school.

== Athletics ==
Quitman High athletics competes in the LHSAA.

Athletics teams for the school include baseball, basketball, cheerleading, cross country, fishing, golf, softball, tennis, and track and field.

== Notable alumni ==
- Toby Borland, Major League Baseball pitcher
- Jimmie Davis, American politician and singer/songwriter, and Governor of Louisiana from 1960 to 1964
