= East Carroll Parish School Board =

School district in Louisiana, United States

Coordinates: 32.7951°N 91.1850°W

East Carroll Parish School Board is a school district headquartered in Lake Providence, Louisiana, United States. The district's boundaries are that of East Carroll Parish.

In the 2012–2013 school year, East Carroll Parish public schools had the third highest rate of improvement statewide in the annual end-of-course examinations administered in Algebra I and English II.

== School uniforms ==
The district requires all students in grades Kindergarten through 8 to wear school uniforms.

== Schools ==
Schools:

- General Trass High School (Lake Providence)
- Griffin Middle Academy (Lake Providence)
- Southside Elementary School (Lake Providence)

Former schools:

- G. W. Griffin High School (Lake Providence)
- Monticello High School
- Northside Elementary School
- Transylvania Elementary School (Transylvania) - By 2005 it had stopped operations and was abandoned.
