= Jackson Parish School Board =

School district in Louisiana, United States

Coordinates: 32.2481°N 92.7193°W

Jackson Parish School Board is a school district headquartered in Jonesboro, Louisiana, United States. The district serves Jackson Parish.

In the 2012–2013 school year, Jackson Parish public schools had the fifth-highest rate of improvement statewide in the annual end-of-course examinations administered in Algebra I and English II.

== School uniforms ==
All district students are required to wear school uniforms.

== Schools ==
=== PreK–12 schools ===
- Quitman High School (Quitman)
- Weston High School (Unincorporated area)

=== 9–12 schools ===
- Jonesboro-Hodge High School (Jonesboro)

=== 5–8 schools ===
- Jonesboro-Hodge Middle School (Jonesboro)

=== PreK–4 schools ===
- Southside Elementary School (Jonesboro)
