= Central Private School =

Location
- 12801 Centerra Court; Baker, Louisiana; United States; 30°33′58.27″N 91°3′37.56″W

Information
- Type: Private School
- Established: 1967
- Headmaster: Dana Russell
- Grades: Pre-K–12
- Enrollment: 470 (2016)
- Colors: Red and grey
- Mascot: Redhawks (formerly Rebels)
- Website: www.centralprivate.org

Central Private School (CPS) or Central Private (CP) is a private education institution located in Central, Louisiana.

== History ==
The school was founded in the 1967 amidst the court ordered desegregation of public schools. CPS is one of several private schools located in East Baton Rouge Parish.

== Faculty ==
The school's faculty is composed of 44.5 FTE teachers.

== Curriculum ==
Subjects include science, art, mathematics, language arts, physical education, social studies, and foreign languages.

== Athletics ==
Central Private joined the Louisiana High School Athletic Association (LHSAA) on July 1, 2019, and competes in the 1-A classification.

Sports offered:

- Baseball
- Basketball
- Football
- Golf
- Tennis

=== Athletics history ===
The school left the Louisiana Independent School Association in 1992 to join the Mississippi Private School Association (MPSA). The MPSA changed its name in 2009 to the Mississippi Association of Independent Schools (MAIS), which renamed itself the Mid-South Association of Independent Schools the day Central Private departed.

=== Championships ===
Baseball Championships

- (12) Championships

The school has won 12 championships since the school's opening including the years 1997, 1998, 1999, 2000, 2005, 2006, 2007, 2008, and 2013.

Basketball Championships

- (5) Championships

The school won four consecutive titles from 1998 to 2002. In 2013, Central Private's boys basketball team became the first boys team from the state of Louisiana to win the MAIS Overall Championship. The Riverdale Academy (Class A) girls won the Overall Tournament in 2003 making them the first Louisiana school to win the MAIS Overall Championship.

=== Mascot ===
In 2019, the school changed its athletic team name from The Rebels to The Redhawks.

== Notable alumni ==
- Lane Mestepey, LSU Tigers baseball pitcher
- Josh Wall, MLB player (Los Angeles Dodgers)
