= Catahoula Parish School Board =

School district in Louisiana, United States

Coordinates: 31.7729°N 91.8211°W

Catahoula Parish School Board is a school district headquartered in Harrisonburg, Louisiana, United States.

The district serves Catahoula Parish.

== Schools ==
=== K-12 schools ===
- Harrisonburg High School

(Harrisonburg)

=== 6-12 schools ===
- Block High School

(Jonesville)

=== PK-5 schools ===
Jonesville Elementary School (Jonesville)
