= Webster Parish School Board =

School district in Louisiana, United States

Coordinates: 32.6180°N 93.2719°W

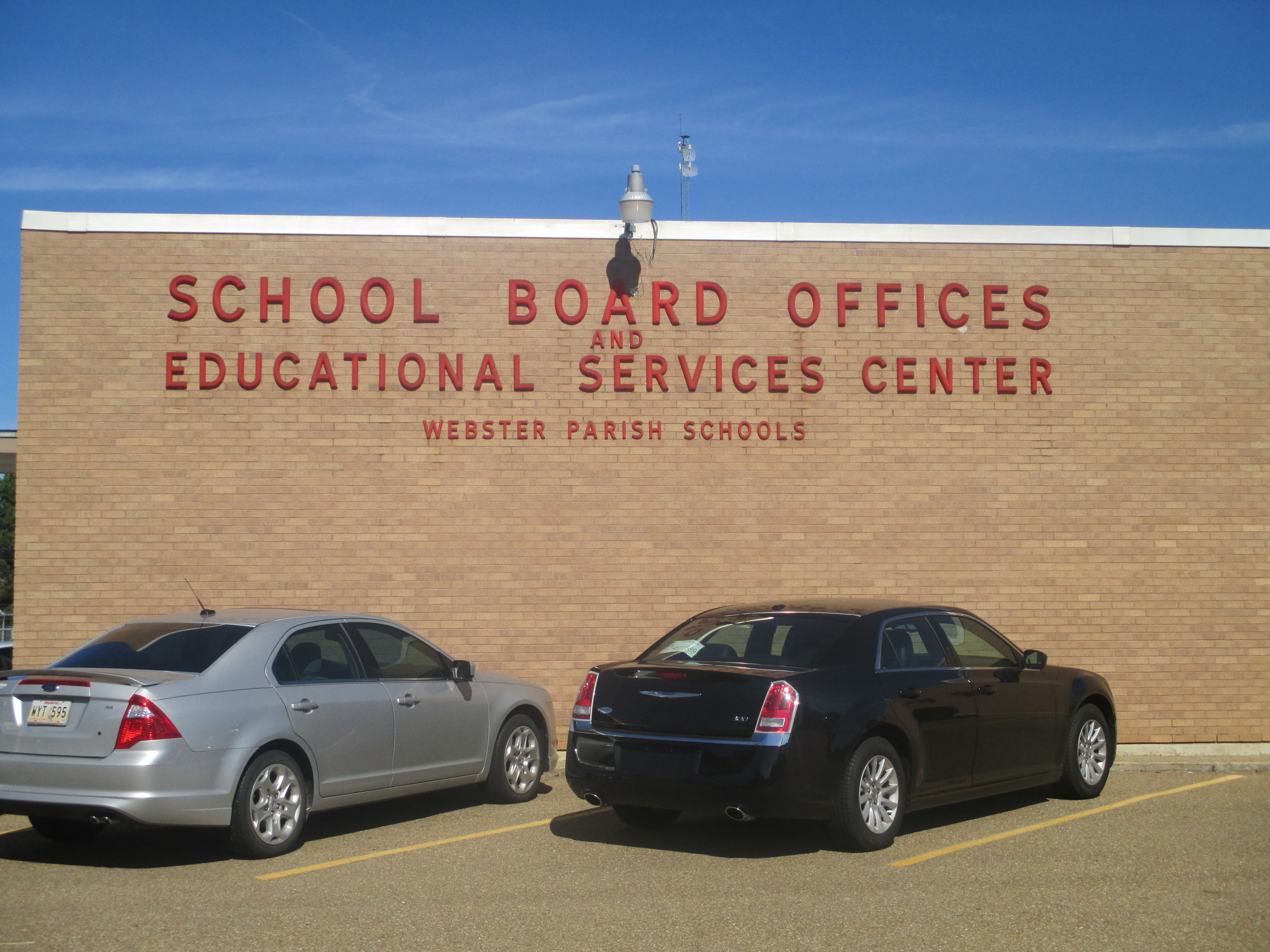
The Webster Parish School Board operates from offices at 1442 Sheppard Street in Minden, Louisiana.

Webster Parish School Board is a school district headquartered in Minden in northwestern Louisiana, United States. The district operates public schools in Webster Parish.

The district is governed by an elected and compensated school board. Daniel R. Rawls begins duties as superintendent on January 7, 2014. In 2017, Johnny Rowland, Jr., was unanimously chosen by the school board as the superintendent to succeed Rawls.

== Schools ==
=== Primary schools ===
PK-6

- Central Elementary School (Unincorporated area/near Heflin)

5-6

- Brown Upper Elementary School (Springhill)

PK and 6

- Philips Middle School (Minden)

K-5

- J. E. Harper Elementary School (Minden) opened in 1971 as a "new concept" school with one large open space without separate classroom and doors. Joe Windham, the former elementary school supervisor, became the first Harper principal.
- Jones Elementary School (Minden)
- E.S. Richardson Elementary School (Minden), grades 4 and 5
- William G. Stewart Elementary School (Minden), closed and razed in 2011
- Union Elementary School (Doyline), closed 2011

=== Secondary schools ===
6-8

- North Webster Jr. High School (Sarepta)

7-8

- Webster Junior High School (Minden)

6-12

- Doyline High School (Doyline)

7-12

- Lakeside Junior-Senior High School (Unincorporated area/south of Sibley)

9-12

- Minden High School (Minden)
- North Webster High School (Springhill)

=== Alternative ===
- Hope Youth Ranch (Evergreen Community), closed
- Webster Parish Achievement Center (Minden)
