= Natchitoches Parish School Board =

School board for district in Louisiana, US

Address
- 310 Royal Street Natchitoches, Natchitoches Parish, Louisiana, 71457; United States
- Coordinates: 31.7487°N 93.0810°W

District information
- Type: Public
- Grades: PK-12
- Superintendent: Dr Grant Eloi

Other information
- School uniform: Required
- Website: www.npsb.la

Natchitoches Parish School Board (NPSB) is a school district headquartered in Natchitoches, Louisiana, United States. The current Superintendent is Dr. Grant Eloi.

== Schools ==
=== PK-2 Schools ===
- L.P. Vaughn Elementary School (Natchitoches, Louisiana)

=== PK-5 Schools ===
- NSU Elementary Lab School (Natchitoches, Louisiana)
- Fairview Alpha Elementary School (Campti, Louisiana)

=== PK-8 Schools ===
- Marthaville Elementary/Jr. High School (Marthaville, Louisiana)
- Natchitoches Magnet School (Natchitoches, Louisiana)
- Provencal Elementary/Jr. High School (Provencal, Louisiana)

=== 3-5 Schools ===
- M.R. Weaver Elementary School (Natchitoches, Louisiana)

=== 6-8 Schools ===
- NSU Middle Lab School (Natchitoches, Louisiana
- Natchitoches Junior High (Natchitoches, Louisiana)

=== 6-12 Schools ===
- Lakeview Junior-Senior High School (Campti, Louisiana)

=== High Schools ===
- Natchitoches Central High School (Natchitoches, Louisiana)

=== Alternative Schools ===
- Natchitoches Provisional Learning Center (Natchitoches, Louisiana)

The former Ashland High School in the village of Ashland closed in 1981 as part of a school consolidation effort. High school pupils from that area attend Lakeview Jr./Sr. High School.
