= St. Helena Parish School System =

Louisiana school district

Coordinates: 30.8285°N 90.6666°W

The St. Helena Parish School District is a public school district headquartered in Greensburg, Louisiana, United States.

The district serves all of St. Helena Parish. The district's mascot is the Hawk.

== Schools ==
There are three schools in the St. Helena Parish School System. One is located within the town of Greensburg. The other two are located in unincorporated areas of St. Helena Parish, but have Greensburg addresses.

- Grades 7-12
  - St. Helena College and Career Academy (Greensburg)
- Grades 3-6
  - St. Helena Arts and Technology Academy (Unincorporated area)
- Grades PK-2
  - St. Helena Early Learning Center (Unincorporated area)

== Integration ==
St. Helena Parish schools were not considered integrated until January 6, 1989, more than four decades after the passing of Brown v. Board of Education in 1954. School segregation ended because the system could no longer keep the separate schools running, with many of the buildings falling into disrepair. Under a plan approved by U.S. District Judge John Victor Parker in Baton Rouge, classes from seven segregated schools were consolidated into three buildings. Judge Parker's 1989 decision ended a lawsuit first filed in 1952 by resident John Hall and the NAACP, who sued the city when he was told by the school district that there was not enough money to furnish a new school and instead, he and other black residents would have to build one to replace an inferior facility.

== Demographics ==
- Total Students (as of October 1, 2007): 1,278
- Gender
  - Male: 53%
  - Female: 47%
- Race/Ethnicity
  - African American: 95.15%
  - White: 4.54%
  - Hispanic: 0.16%
  - Native American: 0.16%
- Socio-Economic Indicators
  - At-Risk: 94.21%
  - Free Lunch: 91.86%
  - Reduced Lunch: 2.35%

== See also ==
- List of school districts in Louisiana
