= Beauregard Parish School Board =

School district in Louisiana, United States

Coordinates: 30°50′41″N 93°17′21″W

Location
- DeRidder, Louisiana; United States

Other information
- Website: www.beau.k12.la.us

Beauregard Parish School Board is a school district headquartered in DeRidder in Beauregard Parish in southwestern Louisiana, United States.

From 1933 to 1944, Gilbert Franklin Hennigan, then of DeRidder, was the school board president. In 1943, he was elected the president of the Louisiana School Board Association. He left the board to serve from 1944 to 1956 in the Louisiana State Senate. A strong advocate of public education, Hennigan worked to make McNeese State University in Lake Charles a four-year college and to pass legislation creating the state teacher retirement system. He died at age 77 in 1960 in Calcasieu Parish.

From 1969 to 1992, Dorothy Sue Hill, the state representative for Allen, Beauregard, and Calcasieu parishes, taught home economics for Beauregard Parish schools. Her husband and legislative predecessor, Herman Ray Hill, was a teacher and coach for the school district.

The district's boundary is that of Beauregard Parish. Military families associated with Fort Johnson, including those on and off post, may choose this district for education of dependents for grades 5-12.

== Schools ==
=== PK-12 schools ===
- Merryville High School (unincorporated area)
- Singer High School (unincorporated area)

=== 6-12 schools ===
- East Beauregard High School (unincorporated area)
- South Beauregard High School (unincorporated area)

=== High schools ===
- DeRidder High School (DeRidder)

=== Junior high schools ===
- DeRidder Junior High School (DeRidder)

=== Elementary schools ===
PK-5

- East Beauregard Elementary School (unincorporated area)
- South Beauregard Elementary School (unincorporated area)

4-5

- Pine Wood Elementary School (DeRidder)

2-3

- G. W. Carver Elementary School (DeRidder)

PK-1

- K. R. Hanchey Elementary School (DeRidder)
