= Caldwell Parish School Board =

School district in Caldwell Parish, Louisiana, U.S.

Location
- Columbia, Louisiana; United States
- Coordinates: 32.1022°N 92.0812°W

District information
- Type: Public School District
- Grades: K-12
- Superintendent: John Sartin
- School board: Caldwell Parish School Board

Students and staff
- District mascot: Spartan
- Colors: Red and White

Other information
- Website: www.caldwelledu.org

Caldwell Parish School Board is a school district headquartered in Columbia, Louisiana, United States. The district serves Caldwell Parish.

== About ==
The Caldwell Parish School Board has split the elementary school into three distinct campuses: K–1st, 2–3rd, and 4–5th campuses.

The school board decreased the school week to four days, with the permission of the superintendent the new shortened school week is planned to save this rural district about $135,000 per year.

The district requires all of its students to wear school uniforms.

== Schools ==
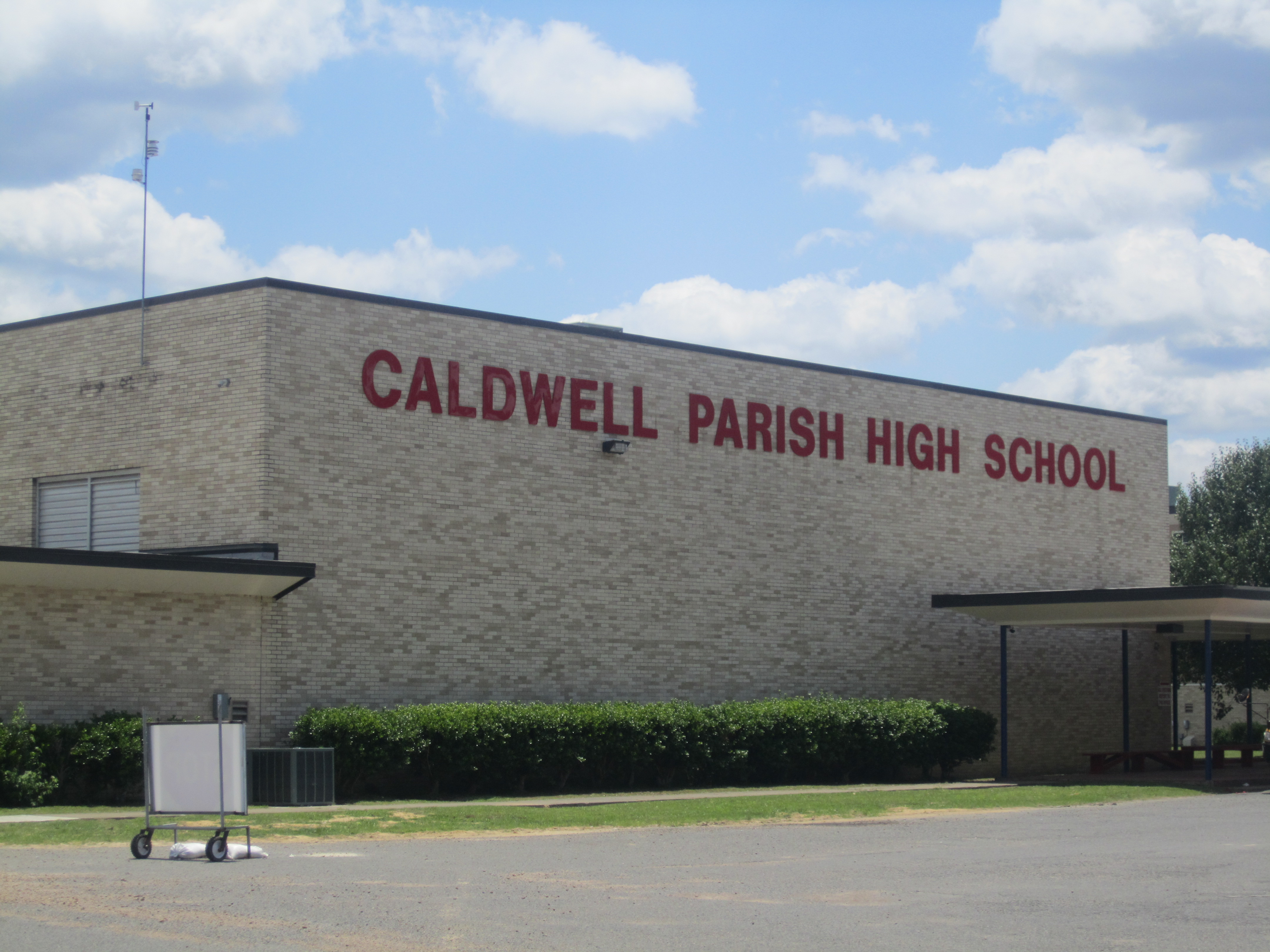
Caldwell Parish High School

=== Secondary schools ===
- Caldwell Parish High School (unincorporated area)
- Caldwell Parish Junior High School (unincorporated area)

=== Primary schools ===
- Columbia Elementary School (Columbia, grades 2–3)
- Grayson Elementary School (Grayson, grades K–1)
- Kelly Elementary School (unincorporated area)
- Union Central Elementary School (unincorporated area, grades 4–5)

=== Preschools ===
- Caldwell Parish Pre-School (unincorporated area)
