= Winn Parish School Board =

School district in Louisiana, United States

Location
- 304 E Court St, Winnfield, Louisiana, United States
- Coordinates: 31.9253°N 92.6365°W

District information
- Grades: K–12
- Superintendent: Steve Bartlett

Other information
- Website: www.winnpsb.org

Winn Parish School Board is a school district headquartered in Winnfield, Louisiana, United States.

The district serves Winn Parish.

== School uniforms ==
The district requires all students to wear school uniforms.

== Schools ==
=== PK–12 schools ===
- Calvin High School (Calvin)
- Dodson High School (Dodson)

=== Secondary schools ===
- 9–12: Winnfield Senior High School (unincorporated area)
- 5–8: Winnfield Middle School (unincorporated area)

=== Primary schools ===
- 1–4: Winnfield Primary School (Winnfield)

=== Former schools ===
- PreK–12: Atlanta High School (Atlanta)
  - The board of trustees closed Atlanta High School in 2023. In June 2023 the board voted to keep the school open. However, in July 2023, the board voted to close the school. Six board members voted to close, while five voted to keep it open. The attendance boundary of the school was reassigned to campuses in Winfield. The closure took into effect right after the vote. Al Simmons, the superintendent, stated that the fact that the school had, of all of the district's schools, the smallest number of students, was a reason why the board closed the school.
- 4–5: Winnfield Intermediate School (Winnfield)
- PreK–K: Winnfield Kindergarten School (Winnfield)
  - In 2018 the board of education stated that it was not closing the school.
