= 2023 Louisiana wildfires =

Natural disasters in the USA

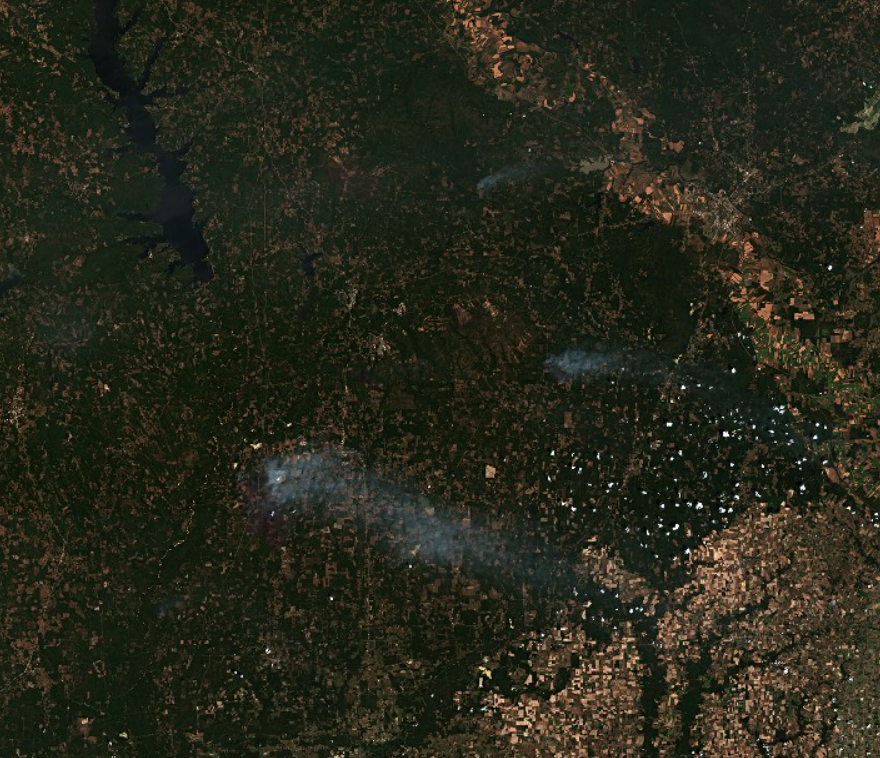
- Wildfires burning in southwest Louisiana on August 26
- Location: Louisiana

Statistics
- Burned area: 33,000

Impacts
- Deaths: 2
- Evacuated: 1,500+
- Structures destroyed: 21

In a three-month period from August to October 2023, wildfires in Louisiana burned more than 60,000 acres (94 sq mi), and forced evacuations across several towns in the state, including Merryville and Singer. First burning on August 22, at least 441 wildfires burned across 17 parishes, they burned at least 21 buildings, prompting the Federal Emergency Management Agency to approve an assistance grant in Beauregard Parish, Louisiana. At least 100 Louisiana National Guard troops were deployed on standby as several wildfires were contained. The most significant fire, the Tiger Island fire in Beauregard Parish, was the largest wildfire recorded in the state, burning over 31,000 acres.

== Preparations and impact ==
Merryville High School closed, and a high school in Singer, Louisiana was closed. Several state routes across Beauregard Parish were closed, including portions of Louisiana highways 27, 110, and 389. In DeRidder, nursing homes were evacuated as a precaution due to the fast-moving Tiger Island fire.

On August 21, a red flag warning was issued for southwestern Louisiana. Wildfire smoke from the Louisiana wildfires was observed as far as Lafayette and Acadiana. Wildfire smoke also caused hazy skies across the New Orleans metropolitan area, and wildfire smoke was observed as far east as southern Mississippi. Several fires started across Calcasieu, Sabine, Tangipahoa, and Vernon parishes, where an arrest was made in connection to the Vernon Parish fire. The wildfire in Tangipahoa parish burned 171 acres (7,400,000 sq ft). As of August 26, all fires across Calcasieu, Sabine, Tangipahoa, and Vernon parishes were contained. A mandatory evacuation was issued for portions of Vernon parish. The wildfires also occurred in an area where an "extreme" or "exceptional" drought was occurring. 17 parishes where wildfires were occurring declared a state of emergency. Water infrastructure near Singer was damaged, leading to significant losses in pressure and causing outages. At least two fatalities occurred.

=== Tiger Island fire ===
On August 22, a fire started in Beauregard Parish, before spreading to numerous areas of the Parish. Power outages occurred in Singer, Louisiana, and a main water line north of Singer burned due to the fires, forcing the Beauregard Parish Police Jury to shut off water from the connecting water lines, including water lines to Merryville. The fire spread further after a gusty thunderstorm produced wind gusts of over 40 miles per hour (64 km/h). At least ten buildings were destroyed by the fires. The town of Evans was also under a mandatory evacuation order. 348 loads of water and nearly 161,000 gallons were used with firefighting efforts. On August 25, evacuation orders were issued for Bancroft and Junction. Two days later, on August 27, the fire grew in size, and, according to officials, eventually became the largest wildfire ever recorded in the state. On August 29, the fire was only 50 percent contained. The Louisiana State Department of Agriculture and Forestry said the fire had been caused by arson. Rainfall across western portions of the fire in early September 2023 helped firefighters to increase the containment of the wildfire to 65 percent. The community of Neale was also burned. One death occurred in Singer.

=== Pitkin fire ===
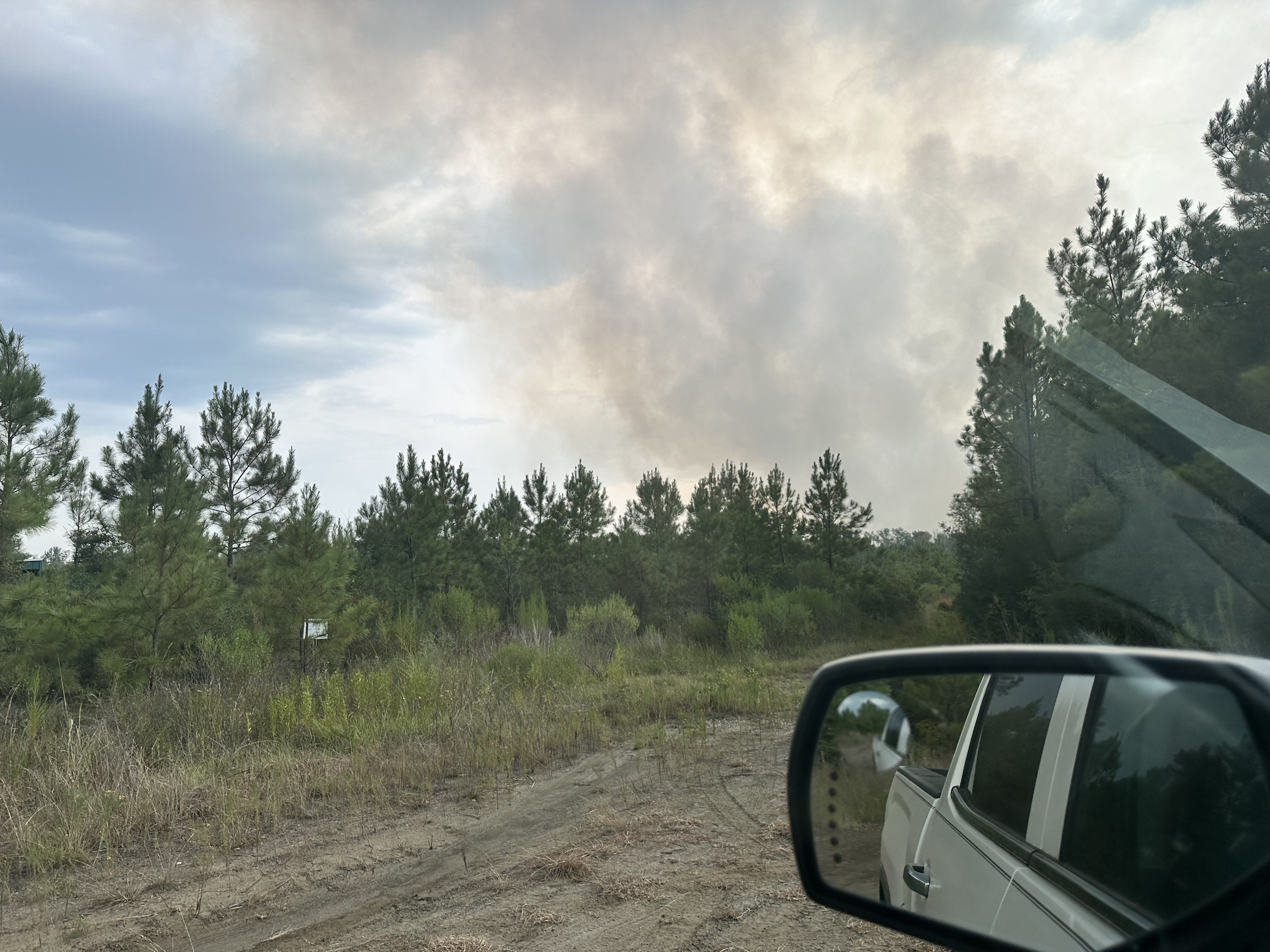
Smoke plumes from the fire near Pitkin on August 26th.

On August 24, a fire described as "out of control" was reported in Vernon Parish, near Pitkin, Louisiana. Nearby residents were evacuated, and multiple structures began to burn.

== Response ==
The Federal Emergency Management Agency approved the Fire Management Assistance Grant in Beauregard Parish. The American Red Cross assisted with relief efforts, and the United States Army Blackhawk helicopters assisted with firefighting operations in addition to Fort Johnson Crash Trucks. Assistance also came from Texas, Oklahoma, Arkansas, and Tennessee, and 161 bulldozers from the National Guard were deployed. A Boeing CH-47 Chinook was also deployed to help with efforts to drop water onto the fires; at least 161,000 gallons of water were dropped from the CH-47. Four strike teams were to arrive from Florida with 160 firefighters and 20 bulldozers. Merryville, Louisiana was under a mandatory evacuation order that has since been lifted. Emergency operations centers were activated on August 23, and a church was opened for a temporary shelter in DeRidder, Louisiana. On August 25, Texas governor Greg Abbott announced that firefighters and emergency personnel would be dispatched to Merryville, Louisiana to assist in firefighting efforts. More than 200 Louisiana National Guard troops were dispatched to assist in firefighting efforts. Louisiana governor John Bel Edwards stated that "Nobody alive in Louisiana has ever seen these conditions." Governor Edwards also assessed damage across Vernon and Sabine parishes. Toledo Bend Army Recreation Park near the Toledo Bend Reservoir was closed. The United Way of southwest Louisiana started a fire fund for collecting donations to assist wildfire victims. On August 29, Beauregard Parish School Board schools resumed operations and classes.
