= National Register of Historic Places listings in Beauregard Parish, Louisiana =

Location of Beauregard Parish in Louisiana

This is a list of the National Register of Historic Places listings in Beauregard Parish, Louisiana.

This is intended to be a complete list of the properties on the National Register of Historic Places in Beauregard Parish, Louisiana, United States. The locations of National Register properties for which the latitude and longitude coordinates are included below, may be seen in a map.

There are 12 properties listed on the National Register in the parish, and one former listing.

This National Park Service list is complete through NPS recent listings posted September 12, 2025.

== Current listings ==
	Name on the Register	Image	Date listed	Location	City or town	Description
1	Beauregard Parish Courthouse	Beauregard Parish Courthouse	September 22, 1983 (#83000490)	201 West 1st Street; 30°50′46″N 93°17′16″W	DeRidder	
2	Beauregard Parish Jail	Beauregard Parish Jail	December 17, 1981 (#81000711)	205 West 1st Street; 30°50′47″N 93°17′18″W	DeRidder	
3	Beauregard Parish Training School	Beauregard Parish Training School	March 1, 1996 (#96000190)	Corner of Martin Luther King Drive and Alexander Street; 30°50′33″N 93°16′20″W	DeRidder	
4	Burks House	Burks House	September 8, 1987 (#87001512)	637 North Railroad Avenue; 30°45′15″N 93°32′30″W	Merryville	
5	DeRidder Commercial Historic District	DeRidder Commercial Historic District	August 9, 1983 (#83000491)	Roughly bounded by Washington Street, West 2nd Street, Stewart Street, and West Port Street; 30°50′51″N 93°17′12″W	DeRidder	
6	DeRidder USO Building	DeRidder USO Building	February 25, 1992 (#92000037)	250 West 7th Street; 30°50′26″N 93°17′19″W	DeRidder	
7	First Street School	First Street School	November 19, 1998 (#98001380)	401 West 1st Street; 30°50′47″N 93°17′23″W	DeRidder	
8	First United Methodist Church	First United Methodist Church	November 21, 1991 (#91001659)	Southwest corner of North Pine Street and West Port Street; 30°50′55″N 93°17′21″W	DeRidder	
9	Hudson River Lumber Company General Manager's House	Hudson River Lumber Company General Manager's House	February 21, 2007 (#07000068)	411 South Washington Street; 30°50′34″N 93°17′13″W	DeRidder	
10	Shady Grove School and Community Building	Shady Grove School and Community Building	December 20, 2002 (#02001545)	2400 Louisiana Highway 26; 30°48′14″N 93°10′30″W	DeRidder	
11	Sills House	Sills House	February 21, 2007 (#07000067)	211 West 4th Street; 30°50′39″N 93°17′19″W	DeRidder	
12	Toy House	Toy House	February 21, 2007 (#07000066)	205 West 4th Street; 30°50′38″N 93°17′17″W	DeRidder	

== Former listings ==
	Name on the Register	Image	Date listed	Date removed	Location	City or town	Description
1	Dry Creek High School Building	Dry Creek High School Building	January 28, 1988 (#87002572)	March 13, 2024	East side of Louisiana Highway 113, about 300 yards (270 m) south of junction with Louisiana Highway 394; 30°40′10″N 93°02′42″W	Dry Creek	Destroyed by fire on February 17, 2021

== See also ==
- List of National Historic Landmarks in Louisiana
- National Register of Historic Places listings in Louisiana
