= Bob McCoy =

American basketball player (1934–2016)

Personal information
- Born: November 28, 1934 Longville, Louisiana
- Died: July 2, 2016 (aged 81) DeRidder, Louisiana
- Listed height: 6 ft 6 in (1.98 m)
- Listed weight: 210 lb (95 kg)

Career information
- High school: Beauregard Parish (DeRidder, Louisiana)
- College: Grambling State (1953–1957)
- NBA draft: 1957: 2nd round, 10th overall pick
- Drafted by: Detroit Pistons
- Position: Forward

Career history

Coaching
- 1958–1970: George Washington Carver HS
- Stats at Basketball Reference

Robert Lee McCoy (November 28, 1934 – July 2, 2016) was an American basketball player and coach. He was born in Longville, Louisiana, and attended Beauregard Parish Training School in nearby DeRidder. McCoy played college basketball for the Grambling State Tigers from 1953 to 1957. He set a Louisiana state record for rebounds in a single game when he grabbed 34 during a 1954 game against Tougaloo College. McCoy was selected by the Detroit Pistons as the 10th overall pick of the 1957 NBA draft and became the first black player from Louisiana to be drafted into the National Basketball Association (NBA). Pistons head coach Charley Eckman asserted that "even such a highly regarded prospect as McCoy" would find it difficult to make the team's 10-player roster and McCoy ultimately never played in the NBA.

McCoy served in the United States Army from 1957 to 1958. He returned to DeRidder to become a teacher and basketball coach at George Washington Carver High School from 1958 to 1970. He also taught and coached at DeRidder High School and in Calcasieu Parish, Louisiana.
