= Beauregard Parish Training School =

- U.S. National Register of Historic Places
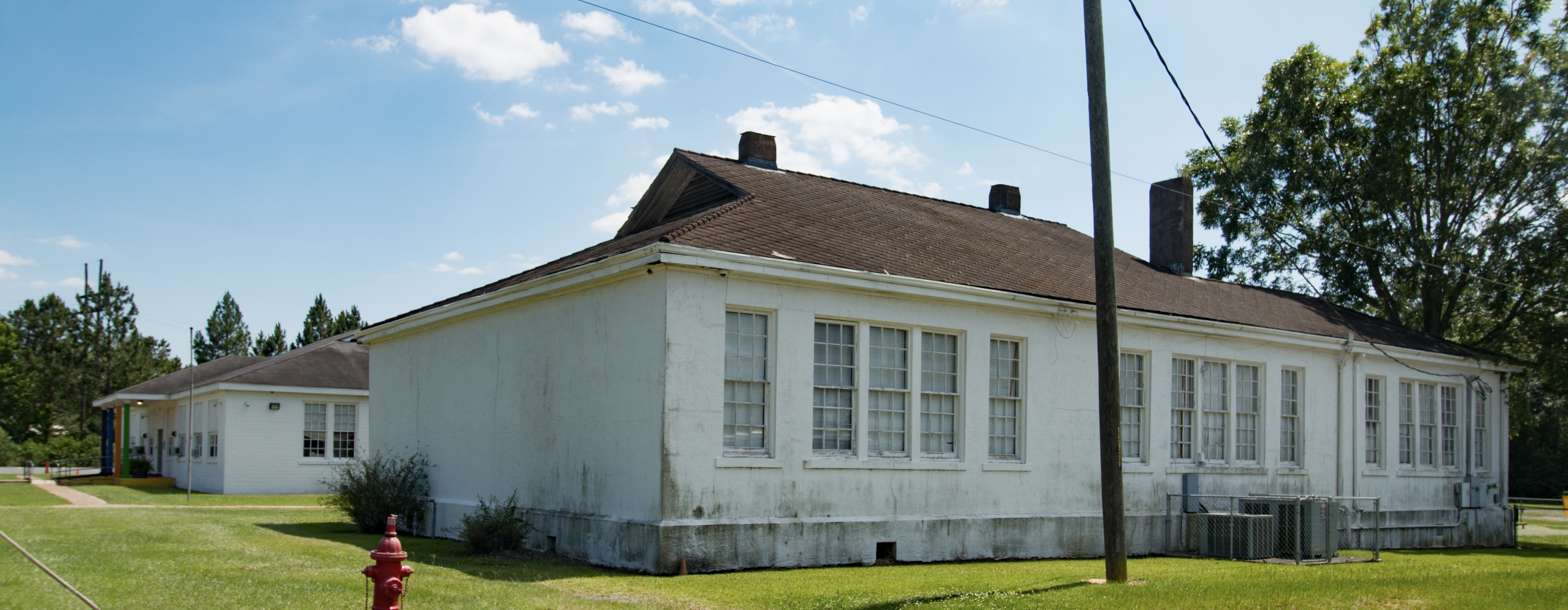

- Location within Louisiana Location within the United States
- Location: Corner of Martin Luther King Drive and Alexander Street, DeRidder, Louisiana
- Coordinates: 30°50′33″N 93°16′20″W
- Area: 1.6 acres (0.65 ha)
- Built: 1929; 1938
- Built by: P. Olivier & Sons
- NRHP reference No.: 96000190
- Added to NRHP: March 1, 1996

The Beauregard Parish Training School (1929–1970) in DeRidder, Louisiana, was a school for black students and black teachers in training. The school's buildings are located on the original property at the corner of Martin Luther King Drive and Alexandria Street, and were the first African-American related structures in southwestern Louisiana to be listed in the National Register of Historic Places, on March 1, 1996.

== Teachers training ==
Teacher preparation was an important goal of the Beauregard Parish Training School from its founding until the mid-1930s when the program was discontinued. Subsequently, students were required to attend one or two years at a normal school in order to obtain a teaching certificate.

The parish training school movement for training black teachers began in 1911. By school year 1919–1920 Beauregard Parish Training School became one of 107 Training schools in the South. The curriculum included regular courses such as math, science, and English, as well as instruction in how to teach. Although each student completing the teaching program was awarded a certificate stating that he or she was qualified to teach at the elementary level in black schools, it was necessary for each to pass a test given by the state Department of Education before that certification was considered valid. After the teaching program was discontinued in the mid-1930s, students were required to attend one or two years at a normal school in order to obtain a teaching certificate. The school curriculum offered and its teachers were highly valued by the black citizens of Beauregard Parish.

== History ==
The concept of the parish training school created in 1911 was made possible through the efforts of four philanthropic foundations interested in the education of African-American youth. These foundations: the General Education Board, the John F. Slater Fund, and Anna T. Jeanes Fund, and the Rosenwald Fund, convinced state education officials throughout the South to work with them to improve educational opportunities for blacks. The training school movement had several goals. The first was to provide each parish with a central public school for blacks. With its good physical facilities and carefully chosen curriculum, this school would serve as a model for other black schools in the area. Another goal was to provide a more thorough education by offering more courses. Thus, students could attend a training school two or three years longer than they could one of their smaller rural cousins. Early in the movement training schools offered at least eight grades; later they offered ten or eleven. A third goal was to provide industrial and manual training for African-American children,"..laying particular emphasis upon subject pertaining to home and farm." The final goal of the parish training school movement was to prepare teachers who would then serve in the region's rural black elementary schools. The first training school in the nation opened in Louisiana's Tangipahoa Parish in 1911.

One of the reasons the training school concept worked was because the General Education Board placed agents within the state education departments and, in some cases, within the parishes themselves. In order to obtain a training school, parishes had to own the property where the building would be erected, recognize the school as part of the public school system, and commit at least $750 from public funds toward its maintenance each year. Beauregard Parish met the first requirement when the Longbell Lumber Company conveyed a tract of land to the School Board on February 6, 1917. However, the parish did not receive its first "Supervisory Agent for Negroes" until July 3, 1919. This person's primary tasks were to assist teachers in writing lesson plans and to create support for black schools. The Beauregard Parish Training School opened in 1920 with a physical plant consisting of two buildings. A large two-story structure served as a high school while a smaller one-story building held the elementary level classes.

Schools for African-American students had existed in the Beauregard Parish towns of Merryville, Ludington, Bon Ami, Carson, Longville, Center Hill, Bancroft and DeRidder at least as early as the 1917-1918 term. Although attendance figures for each year are not available, those for the 1923-1924 nine month indicate that an average of 420 students attended the school with as many as 450 having attended at one time. Average daily attendance was around 318 children. State Board of Education records indicate that 19 of the Training School's students boarded within the DeRidder community during that school year.

== Fire of 1929 and architecture ==
The original elementary and high school buildings were destroyed by a fire of unknown origin in 1929. Bids for replacement buildings were opened on July 23, 1929, with the contract awarded to P. Olivier & Son for $20,300. This amount underwrote the construction of twin, one-story, hollow tile buildings with stuccoed exterior surfaces. The State Board of Education annual report for 1930-31 shows that each of these buildings contained five classrooms. Part of the curriculum at that time : reading, writing, and math (grades 2-3); history and geography (grade 4); English, history and literature (grade 7) and algebra and geometry (the high school grades).

The 1929 building's massing is that of a rectangle beneath a low, slightly overhanging tripped roof. This roof is broken by a low pediment-like gable on the facade, by gablets on each end, and by three tall chimneys. The smooth walls are pierced by bands of windows with concrete sills, on the front and rear. The entrance, which features sidelights, is located at the rear of a small vestibule whose door-less opening is distinguished by a bracketed cornice. The vestibule and entrance are located in the center of the facade within a bay which projects from the rest of the building about 4 inches. A small wing is attached to the northwest corner of the structure. The interior originally consisted of five classrooms organized around an L-shaped hallway. Each room had a high ceiling, plaster walls, and a door with a six-light transom above.

The 1938 one-story brick building has a T-shaped footprint. Two large classrooms with a lobby in between take up the front portion of the building, while a gymnasium is provided for in the rear wing. The building features a series of paired windows on both the classroom and gym sections. The end allows the gym to double as an auditorium.

== Rosenwald School ==
The Beauregard Parish Training School would be considered a Rosenwald School. Funds of $500.00 was given to the parish to assist in building a school by the Rosenwald Fund.

In 2002, the National Trust for Historic Preservation named Rosenwald Schools near the top of the country's most endangered places and created a campaign to raise awareness and money for preservation.

== George Washington Carver High School ==
In 1953 the R.H. Crosby family donated a school building to Beauregard Parish to relieve crowding at the training school. This became known as George Washington Carver High School, and remained in operation until the public schools were integrated in 1970.

== Historical importance and current usage ==
The Beauregard Parish Training School was placed on the National Register of Historic Places on March 1, 1996. Unveiling of a Plaque designating the Beauregard Parish Training School as a Historical Landmark occurred November 16, 2001.

One of the twin classroom buildings constructed in 1929 was destroyed by another fire during the mid-1930s. Instead of replacing it with a similar building, the school board elected to construct a combination classroom building/gymnasium on the site. It was completed in 1938. Both the 1929 and 1938 buildings continued to be used as educational facilities well into the post-World War II period - as the Beauregard Parish Training School until c. 1941 and as a regular public school after that date. During the historic period (1929–1945), and into the postwar era, the school was the only opportunity in the parish for blacks to receive a high school education. The large rural parish had a population of 14,847 in 1940, one-fifth of which was black. The parish seat of DeRidder was the only town of any size. A 1948 government document notes that there were in that year eight high schools and eight elementary schools for whites and one high school and two elementary schools for blacks.

Both buildings are now used as part of BeauCARE Head Start educational program for early childhood education.

== See also ==
- National Register of Historic Places listings in Beauregard Parish, Louisiana

== Sources ==
- Velmer Lenora Smith, DeRidder historian
- State of Louisiana, Division of Historic Preservation, Office of Culture, Recreation, Tourism.
- Lewis, A. C., Special Report on Negro Education in Louisiana, Session 1923-1924, Baton Rouge:
- Beauregard Parish Planning Board, Beauregard Parish Resources and Facilities, 1949, 1959.
- Louisiana State Department of Education, November 1924.
