= Sugartown, Louisiana =

- Census-designated place
- Location of Sugartown in Louisiana
- Coordinates: 30°50′10″N 93°0′24″W
- Country: United States
- State: Louisiana
- Parish: Beauregard
- Settled: circa 1816

Area
  - Land: 1.96 sq mi (5.08 km^{2})
  - Water: 0 sq mi (0.00 km^{2})
- Elevation: 164 ft (50 m)

Population (2020)
  - Total: 33
  - Density: 17/sq mi (6.5/km^{2})
- Time zone: UTC-6 (CST)
  - Summer (DST): UTC-5 (CDT)
- ZIP code: 70662
- Area code: 337
- FIPS code: 22-73570
- GNIS feature ID: 2586714

Sugartown is an unincorporated community and census-designated place in Beauregard Parish, Louisiana, United States, approximately 16 miles (26 km) east of DeRidder. As of the 2020 census, Sugartown had a population of 33. The geographical center of Sugartown today is posted as the intersection of LA 112 and LA 113.

== Governing body ==
The governing body for Sugartown is the Beauregard Parish Police Jury with DeRidder as the parish seat. Law enforcement is provided by the Beauregard Parish Sheriff's Office, and the Louisiana State Police patrol the state highways.

== Timber industry ==
The timber industry is a major part of the economy due to the many tree farms in the Sugartown area. From the early 19th century to the 1920s timber companies owned large tracts of land and would clear-cut the huge virgin pines. When the pines were cut out, the sawmills would move and the towns would dry up. Pine stumps, and those referred to as rich lighter, are still harvested today. With replanting of trees the timber industry is still thriving with harvested wood delivered to sawmills and the Boise Cascade paper mill in DeRidder.

== History ==
Although some individual families had come into the lower Calcasieu region earlier, the first permanent settlement in Southwest Louisiana at or around Sugartown occurred before 1818 when the area was part of the Neutral Strip. It was home to the first cotton gin west of the Calcasieu River (which operated more than 40 years), the first local school, the earliest cemetery, and the earliest church in the area. At the turn of the 20th century, Sugartown consisted of a Masonic Lodge, school, churches, racetrack, saloons, boarding houses, stores, supply houses and a doctor's office. Although never legally incorporated, Sugartown was the center of organized community life, the recognized trade, business and economic center of the area until, due to the growth of the timber industry and the location of the railroad, DeRidder supplanted it in the early 20th century.

=== Township ===
The Sugartown township was first surveyed in 1807, after the Louisiana Purchase. The village was first a way-station and overnight camping stop for travellers because Sugar Creek is easy to ford at this point.

Sugartown eventually became the major stopping point on the well-travelled and direct route from Lake Charles to Alexandria. Large cattle drives were made along this route from the holding point near what is now the Beauregard Regional Airport to the rail shipping point at Lecompte.

=== First school ===
The Sugartown Male and Female Academy was established in 1870. It is generally recognized that this school marked the beginning of the educational system of Southwest Louisiana. W. H. Baldwin, a graduate of Columbia University, was its first professor. Pupils came to him from approximately ten parishes in Louisiana and from several counties in East Texas. Graduates of the academy became leaders in medicine, ministry, education, government and business. Their influence is still felt today in many fields of public service.

=== Community name ===
There are two stories as to how Sugartown got its name. The first is that a wagon overturned while crossing the creek, spilling its expensive and delicious cargo into the creek, thus giving birth to both the name of the creek and the town. The second story is that an early settler allowed an unwatched pot of sugar cane juice to cook too long, turning the boiling syrup into sugar.

=== Mail ===
From about 1820 to 1840, mail had to be picked up at Belgrade, Texas, at the Sabine River boat landing below Merryville. In 1841 a post office was established at Sugartown with weekly deliveries by horseback from Lake Charles via Petersburg.

=== Old cemetery ===
The earliest settlers are buried in the "Old Campground Cemetery", one of the oldest cemeteries in the area. It is situated near the site of an ancient ford crossing of Sugar Creek and a way station where the pioneers of the early 19th century camped and rested before resuming their journeys to the West.

=== End of the Queen City ===
The population of Sugartown began to dwindle and businesses moved away when the railroads were laid to serve the busy sawmill towns of Bon Ami, Ludington, Fullerton and DeRidder. Had any of these mills or rail lines been built at Sugartown, it probably would have retained its prominent role as the leader and "Queen City of the Frontier".

== Notable person ==
- Cleveland Dear, former member of the United States House of Representatives from Louisiana's 8th congressional district, was born in Sugartown in 1888.

== Demographics ==
Historical population
Census	Pop.	Note	%±
2010	54		—
2020	33		−38.9%
U.S. Decennial Census

Sugartown was first listed as a census designated place in the 2010 U.S. census.

== Sugartown today ==
The community of Sugartown today is little more than a crossroads. The watermelons still grown in the area are now mostly hybrids bred to endure shipping, although the original Sugartown watermelon, the "Crimson Sweet" variety, is still locally grown. Regionally, if a local melon is relatively sweet, many will call it a "Sugartown melon" whether the melon was grown in the Sugartown area or not.

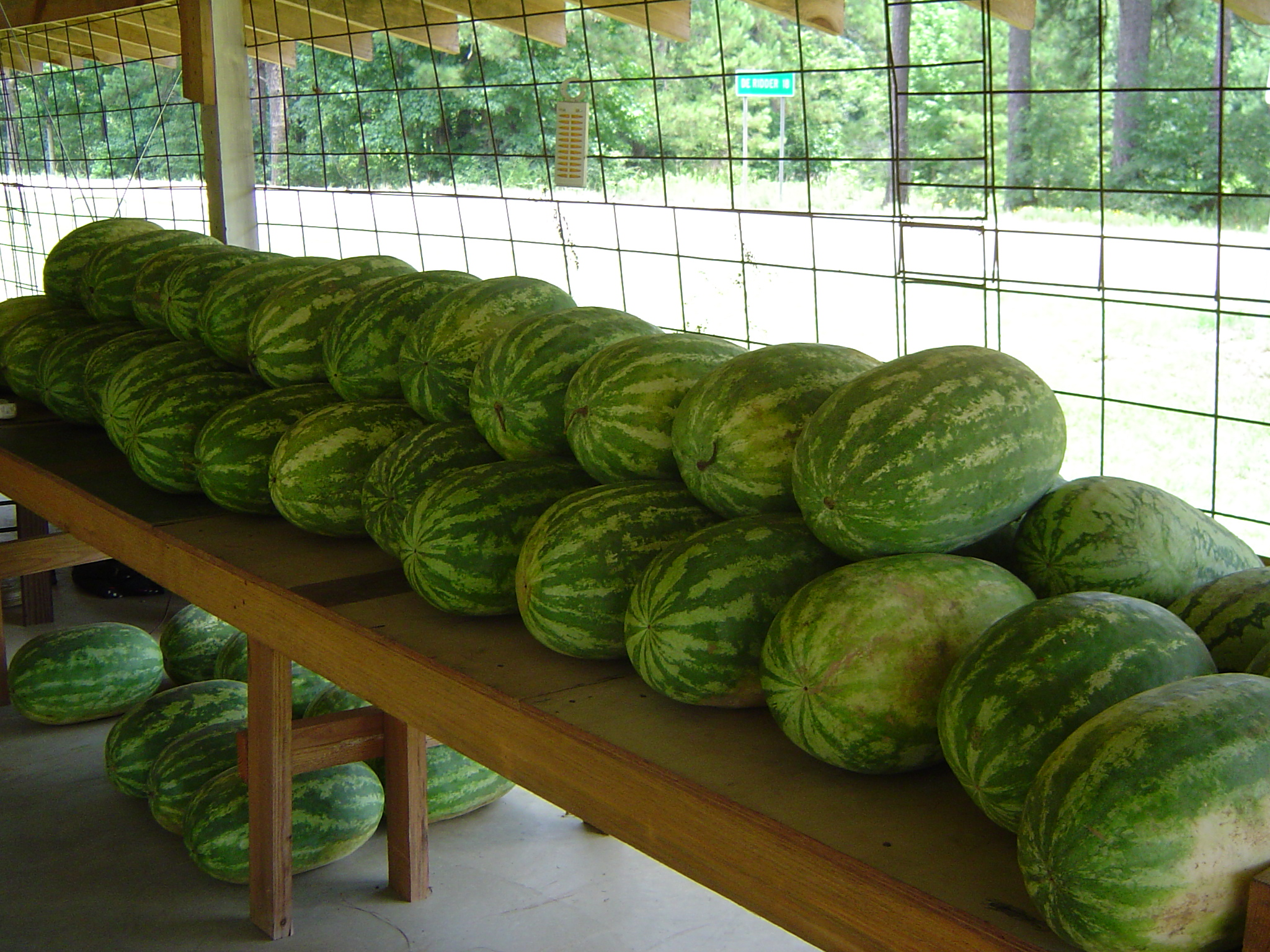
Watermelon stand in Sugartown

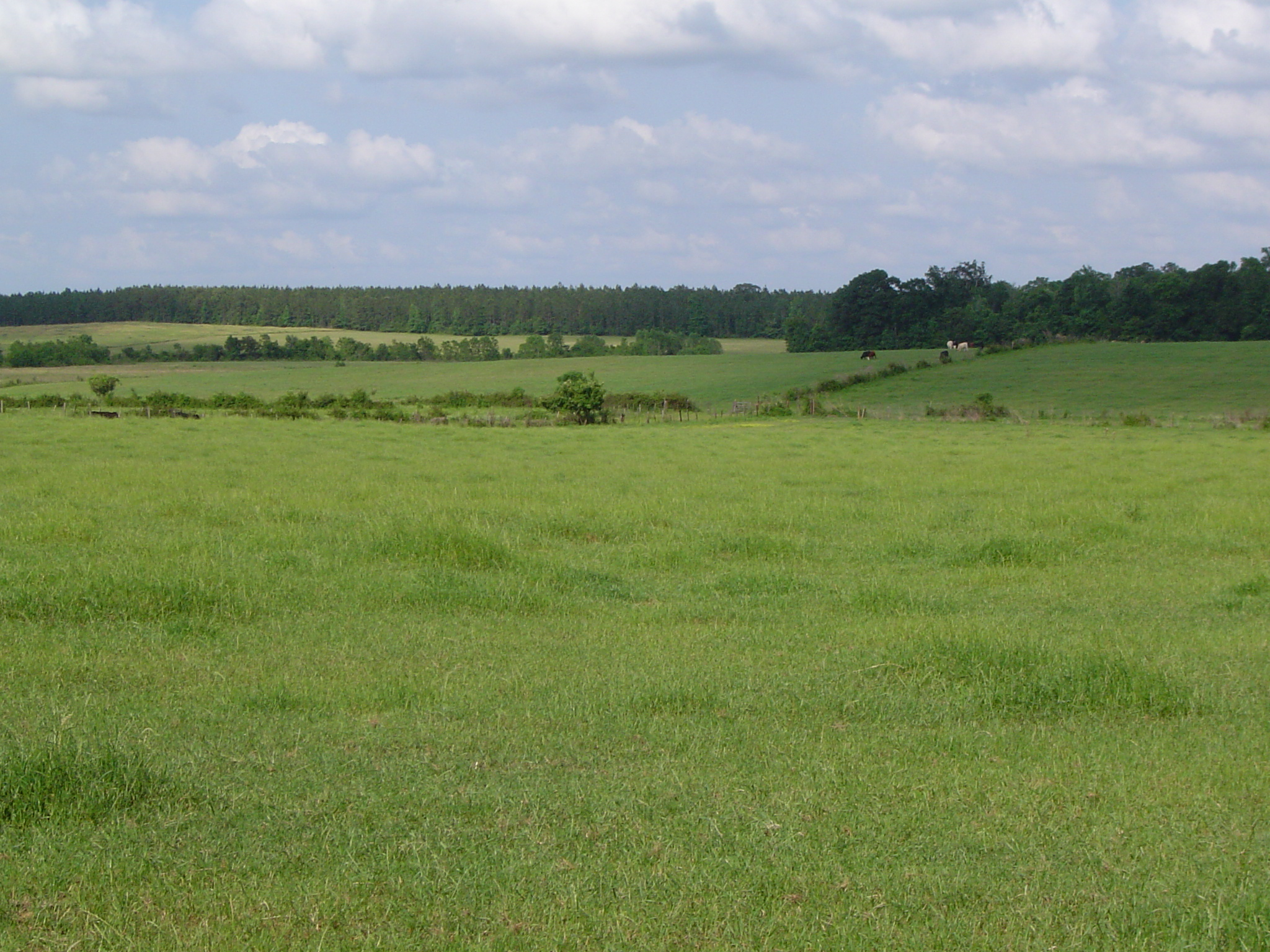
Fields in Sugartown

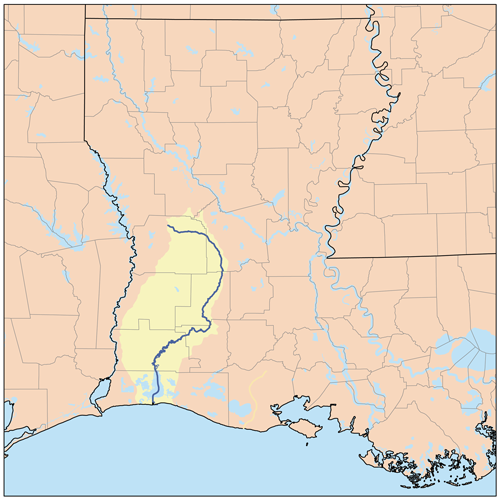
Calcasieu River, eastern Neutral Strip boundary
