= Burks House (Merryville, Louisiana) =

Historic house in Louisiana, United States

- U.S. National Register of Historic Places
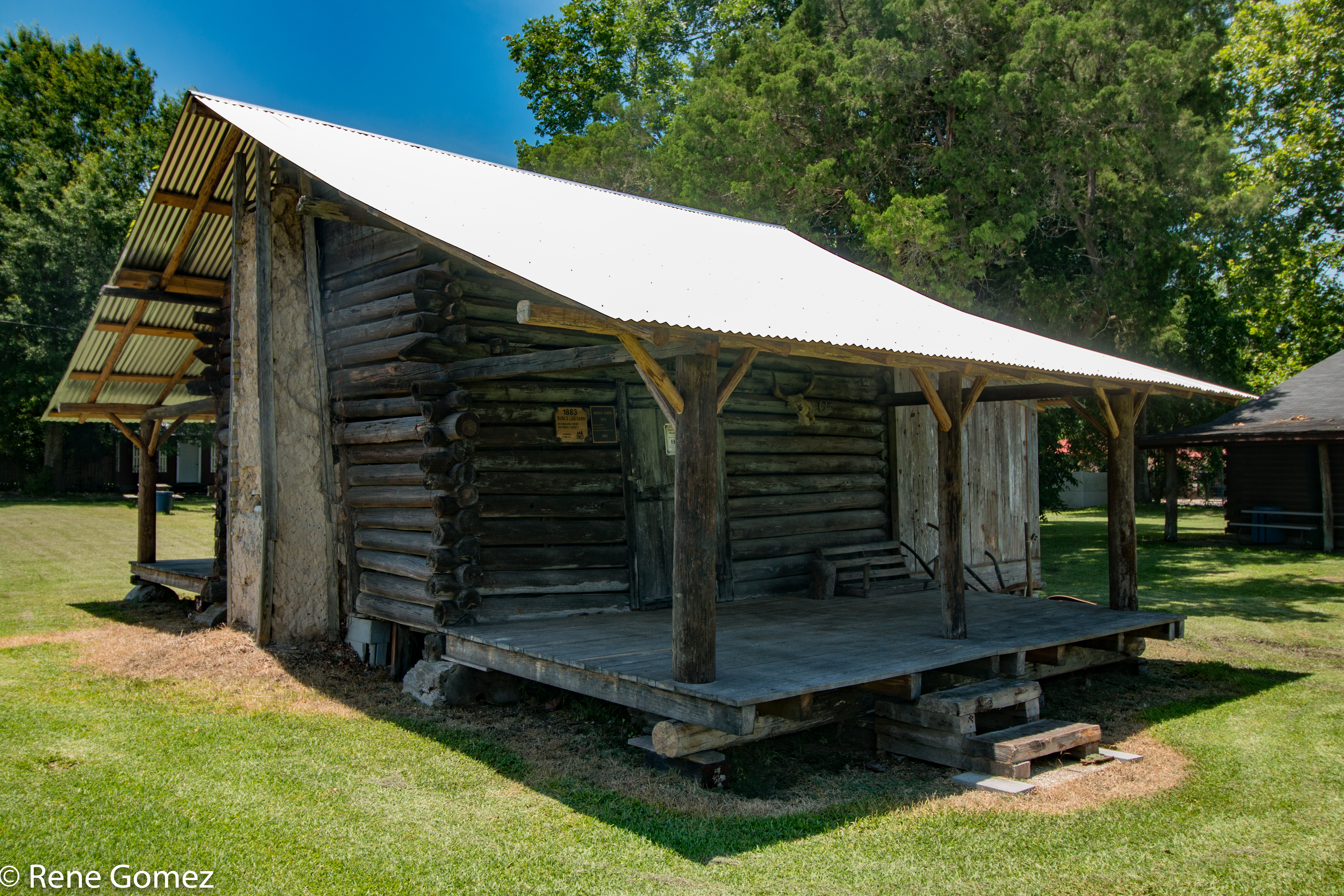

- Location within Louisiana Location within the United States
- Location: 637 North Railroad Avenue, Merryville, Louisiana
- Coordinates: 30°45′15″N 93°32′30″W
- Area: 0.05 acres (0.020 ha)
- Built: 1883
- Built by: A.J. Burks
- Architectural style: Upland South
- NRHP reference No.: 87001512
- Added to NRHP: September 08, 1987

Burks House, is a log cabin with a mud-daub chimney built in 1883. The house is typical of those built in the 19th century when the area was officially open to homesteading.

The cabin was moved to its present location in 1983, completely restored, and was enlisted on the National Register of Historic Places on September 8, 1987. It is the only authentic log cabin in Beauregard Parish.

== See also ==
- National Register of Historic Places listings in Beauregard Parish, Louisiana
