= First United Methodist Church (DeRidder, Louisiana) =

Historic church in Louisiana, United States

- U.S. National Register of Historic Places
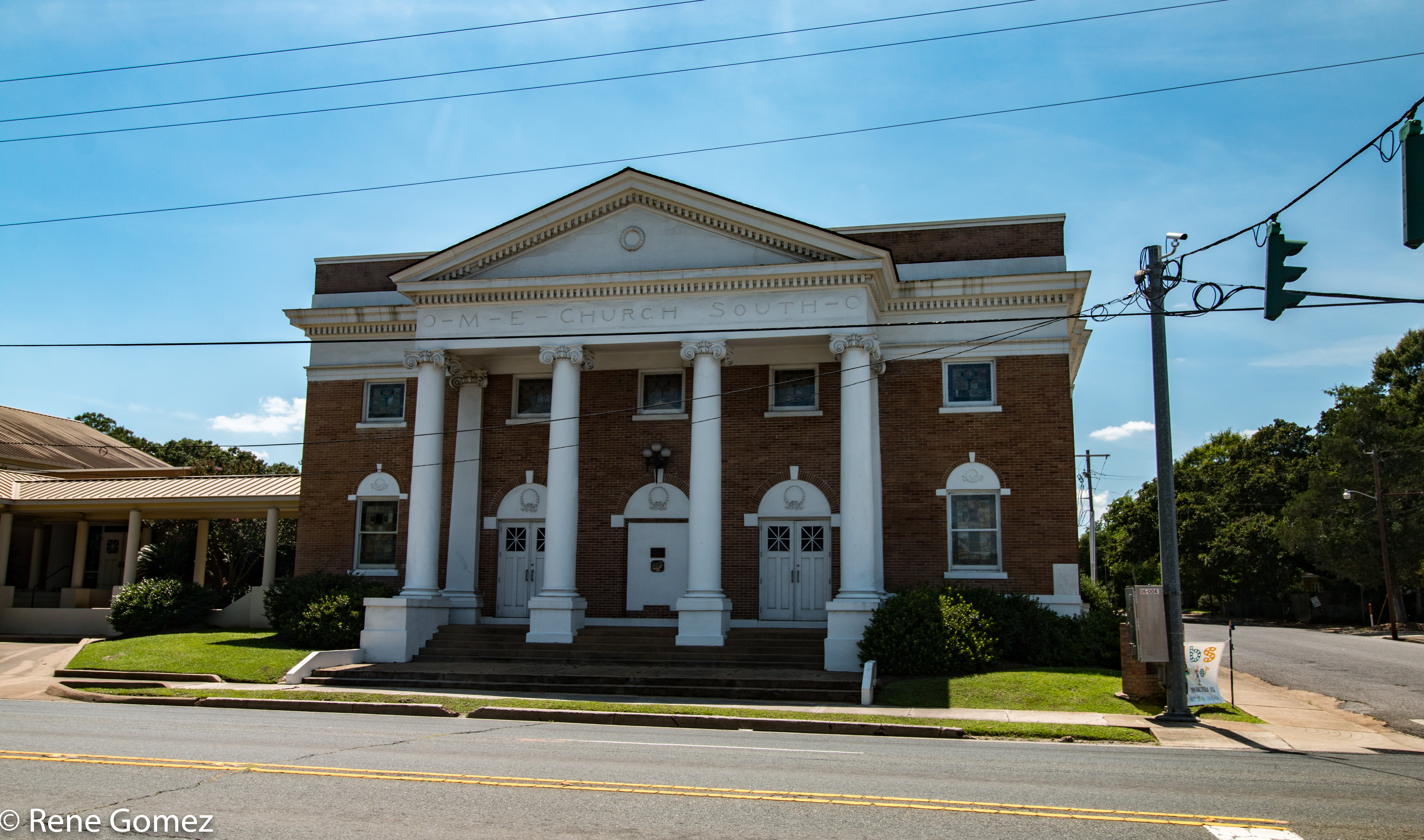

- Location within Louisiana Location within the United States
- Location: Southwest corner of North Pine Street and West Port Street, DeRidder, Louisiana
- Coordinates: 30°50′55″N 93°17′21″W
- Area: less than one acre
- Built: 1915
- Architect: William Drago
- Architectural style: Classical Revival
- NRHP reference No.: 91001659
- Added to NRHP: November 21, 1991

First United Methodist Church is a historic church located at the junction of North Pine Street and West Port Street in DeRidder, Louisiana. The two story Classical Revival tan brick building was built in 1915 and is now part of a church complex occupying an entire city block. The facade portico with Ionic columns and the glass windows have unchanged since the time of construction, and the church exterior is very well preserved. A new church was built in the 1960s on the southern portion of the block and the historic church interior was deeply altered in order to host a basketball court.

The church was added to the National Register of Historic Places in 1991.

== See also ==
- National Register of Historic Places listings in Beauregard Parish, Louisiana
