= Beauregard Parish Courthouse =

- Beauregard Parish Jail
- U.S. National Register of Historic Places
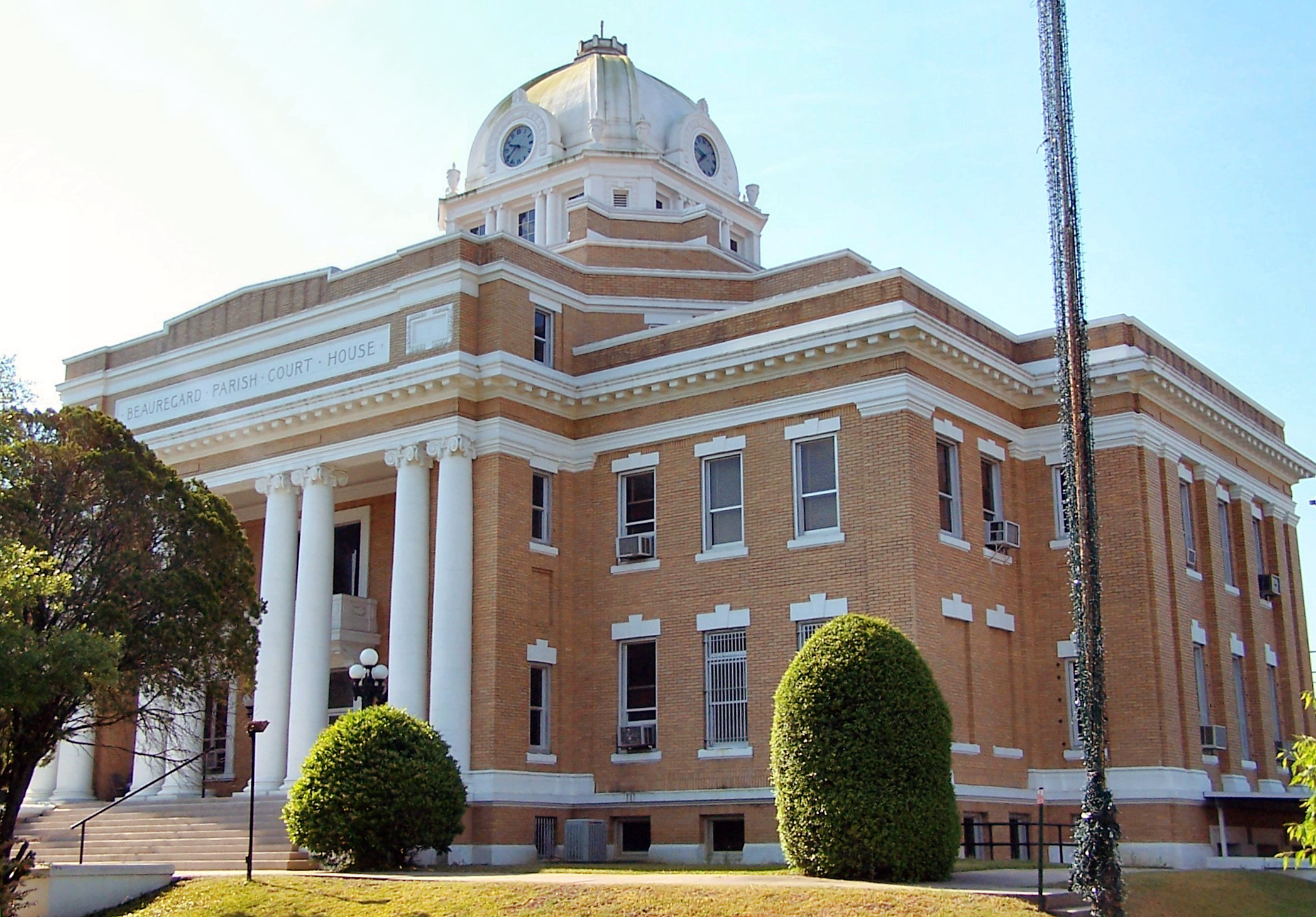

- Location within Louisiana Location within the United States
- Interactive map showing the location of Beauregard Parish Courthouse
- Location: 201 West 1st Street, DeRidder, Louisiana
- Coordinates: 30°50′46″N 93°17′16″W
- Area: 1 acre (0.40 ha)
- Built: 1914
- Architect: Stevens and Nelson
- Architectural style: Beaux-Arts
- NRHP reference No.: 83000490
- Added to NRHP: September 22, 1983

The Beauregard Parish Courthouse is located in DeRidder, Louisiana, the location of the parish seat. The courthouse was built at the same time as the Beauregard Parish Jail, by the same people, and completed around the same time in 1915, as directed by the Beauregard Parish Police Jury.

The courthouse was added to the National Register of Historic Places on 22 September 1983.

== History ==
The Hudson River Lumber Company donated a tract of land to the City of DeRidder. Property that adjoined this tract was owned by the First Baptist Church. The newly formed Beauregard Parish Police Jury, carved out of the old Imperial Calcasieu Parish, purchased the property and a building from the church. Stevens-Nelson of New Orleans was chosen to design a courthouse and jail. Falls City Construction Company was awarded the contract in September 1913. Both buildings were completed in 1915 at a cost of $168,000.

== Tunnel ==
There is a lighted tunnel leading to the jail. It was incorporated into the design to facilitate the transfer of accused or prisoners to and from the jail to stand trial while maintaining safety. The tunnel is no longer in use.

The jail has now been renovated to some degree and is open for tours to the public during weekdays and there are special lantern tours at night on occasion, as well as a haunted house around Halloween each year. The tunnel, however, has been completely blocked off at some point between the jail and the courthouse. The small portion visible from the jail side usually has standing water inside it, sometimes quite a lot of water. Thus, it is no longer lighted and/or usable by anyone.

== Notoriety ==
A trial that ended in two hangings in the Beauregard Parish Jail took place at the courthouse. This gave rise to the name "Hanging Jail" but any notoriety concerning the courthouse was lost after the hanging on March 9, 1928.

== Current ==
The 101 year courthouse was in need of updating, that included expansion for a third courtroom, handicap access, elevator upgrades (ADA accessible), sewer upgrades and a facelift to include the courtyard and sidewalks. A new sprinkler and fire alarm system is also included. Corne Lemaire Group is the architectural firm and the bid from Pat Williams Construction was accepted.

The policy jury had previously purchased a large former First Baptist Church compound, located beside and behind the jail, and the main building has been renovated to be temporarily used.

== See also ==
- National Register of Historic Places listings in Beauregard Parish, Louisiana
