= Hawthorne USO Building =

- U.S. National Register of Historic Places
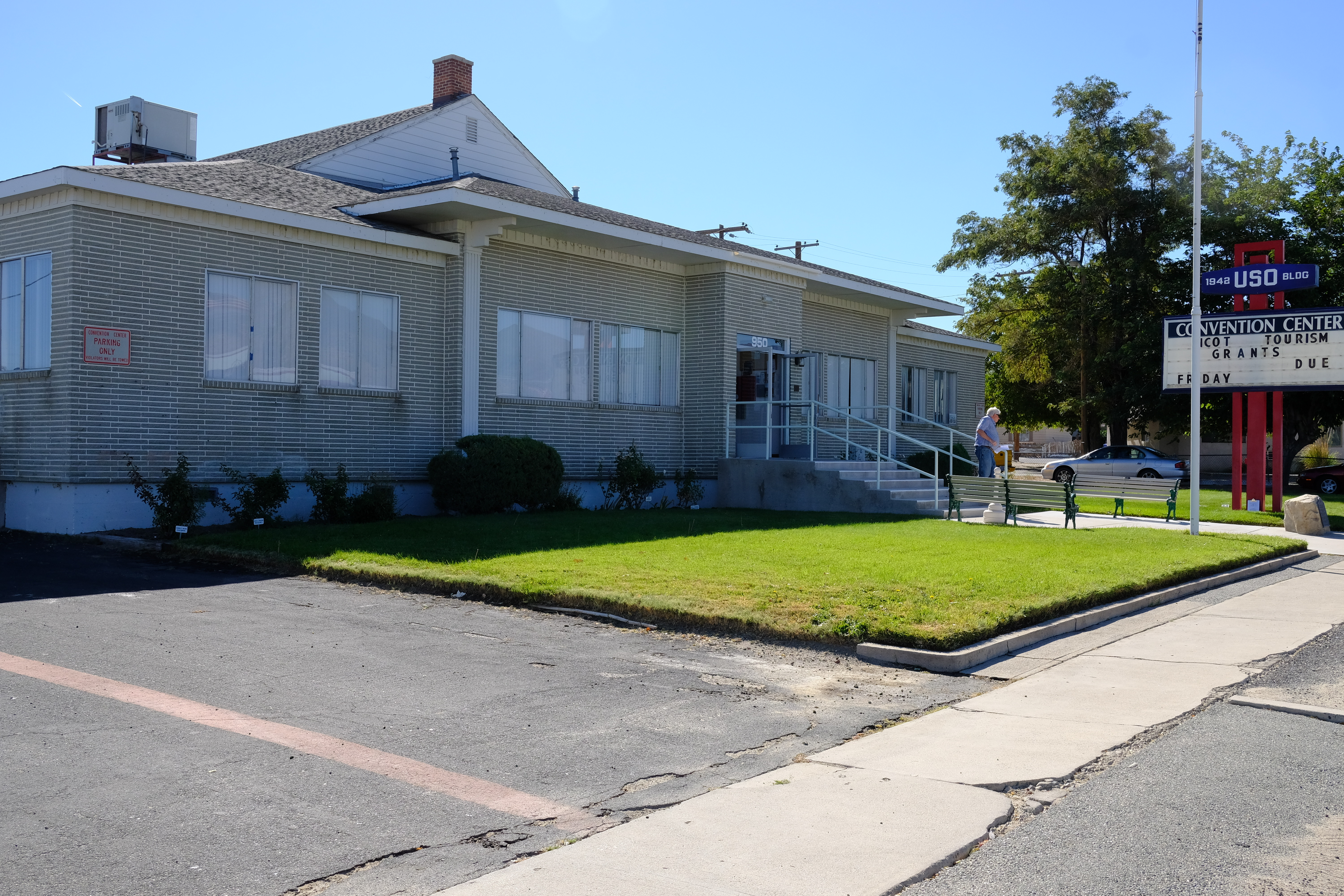

- Location within Nevada Location within the United States
- Location: 950 E St. Hawthorne, Nevada
- Coordinates: 38°31′55″N 118°37′20″W
- Area: 0.8 acres (0.32 ha)
- Built: 1941
- NRHP reference No.: 02000703
- Added to NRHP: February 18, 2005

The Hawthorne USO Building, at 950 E St. in Hawthorne, Nevada, was built in 1941 as a World War II United Services Organization (USO) social hall. It opened in January 1942. It is a simple 90-by-160-foot (27 m × 49 m) "modified I plan" standard "USO Type D Federal Recreation Building", on Hawthorne's main street.

It was listed on the National Register of Historic Places in 2005. It was deemed significant for association "with the purpose and activities of the USO in Nevada during World War II" and for association with the West Coast U.S. Naval Ammunition Depot, sited in Hawthorne in 1928 after New Jersey's Lake Denmark Naval Ammunition Depot blew up.

== See also ==
- Bay City USO Building, Bay City, Texas, also NRHP-listed
- DeRidder USO Building, DeRidder, Louisiana, also NRHP-listed
- East Sixth Street USO Building, Hattiesburg, Mississippi, also NRHP-listed
