= DeRidder Commercial Historic District =

Historic district in Louisiana, United States

- U.S. National Register of Historic Places
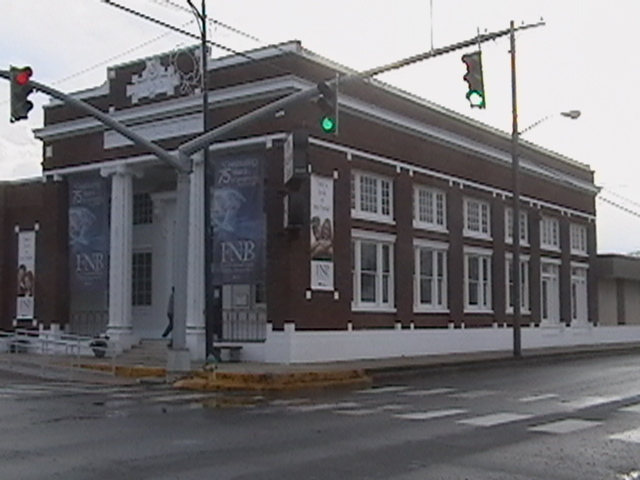
- First National Bank building(1920)

- Location within Louisiana Location within the United States
- Location: Roughly bounded by Washington Street, West 2nd Street, Stewart Street, and West Port Street, DeRidder, Louisiana
- Coordinates: 30°50′51″N 93°17′12″W
- Area: 8 acres (3.2 ha)
- Built: 1900 to 1933
- NRHP reference No.: 83000491
- Added to NRHP: August 9, 1983

The DeRidder Commercial Historic District is a historic district in DeRidder, Louisiana. It covers an 8 acres (3.2 ha) area roughly bounded by Washington Street, West 2nd Street, Stewart Street, and West Port Street and comprises three blocks of commercial and commerce related buildings dating from 1900 to 1933. Earliest buildings (c. 1905) are mainly one story brick structures, while later ones are one to two stories tall.

The district was added to the National Register of Historic Places in 1983. The nearby Beauregard Parish Courthouse and Beauregard Parish Jail were not included in the historic district as not directly related to the commercial history of the town.

== History ==
The DeRidder Commercial Historic District has been the trading center of the parish since about 1905. From 1918 to 1920 several buildings, including the First National Bank, were built. When the lumber boom ended in 1925, the commercial district was enough developed to survive and avoided DeRidder to become a ghost town. The fact the district was mainly composed by brick buildings helped it remain quite intact, despite numerous fires happened over the years.

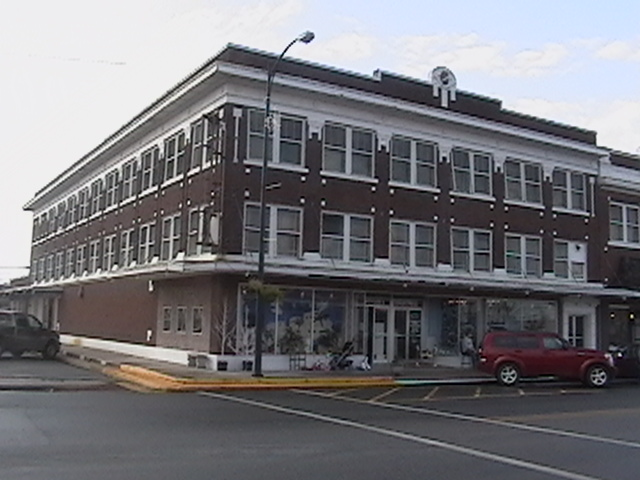
Mullers Building in 2009

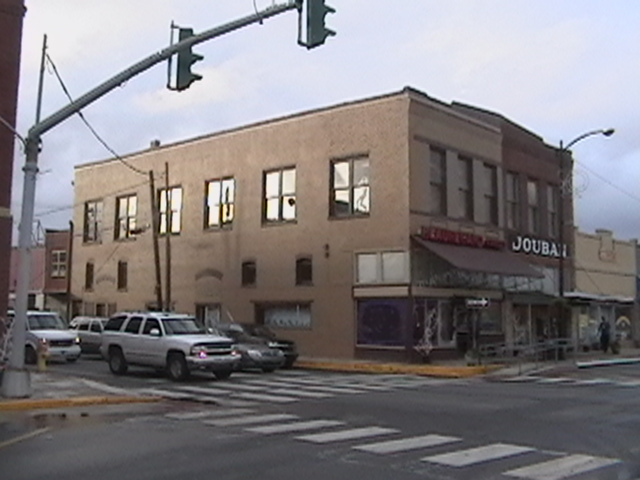
Two non contributing properties at 101 and 103 North Washington Harper's one story historic building is visible on the right

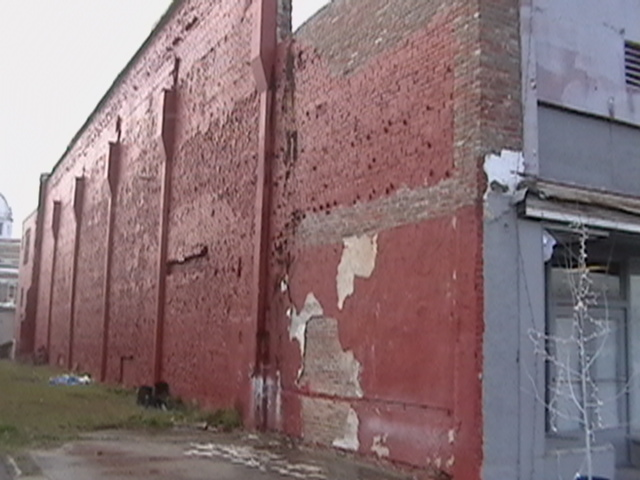
Side of the historic building at 115 South Washington Street

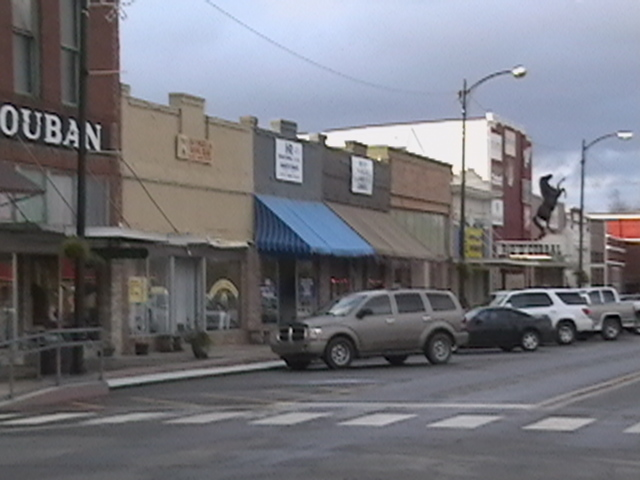
Harper's, Bradley's, Daniel's Jewelers, Old Lumberman's Bank and several other non-contributing buildings

=== Contributing Properties ===
The historical district contains a total of 27 contributing properties, built between c. 1905 and 1930:

- Mullers, 121 South Washington Street, 30°50′45″N 93°17′12″W, built c. 1915
- Hicks Clothing Store, 119 South Washington Street, 30°50′46″N 93°17′12″W, built c. 1915
- Building at 115 South Washington Street, 30°50′46″N 93°17′11″W, built c. 1915
- House of Fashion/Crafts and Gem, 105-107 South Washington Street, 30°50′47″N 93°17′11″W, built c. 1930
- Old City Savings Bank, 101-103 South Washington Street, 30°50′47″N 93°17′11″W, built c. 1915
- DeRidder School of Beauty Culture, 109 West 1st Street, 30°50′48″N 93°17′12″W, built c. 1915
- Irvine's Drug Store, 111 West 1st Street, 30°50′48″N 93°17′12″W, built c. 1915
- Delia's Coin Shop, now Serenity Park, 117 West 1st Street, 30°50′47″N 93°17′13″W, built c. 1915. Building partly demolished between March and April 2008. Area converted to a park. A plaque mentioning Coin Shop is standing near the entrance.
- Dilk's Furniture, 119 West 1st Street, 30°50′47″N 93°17′14″W, built c. 1915. Building demolished some time between June 2014 and October 2015. Pillars and part of exterior walls still standing.
- Harper's, 105 North Washington Street, 30°50′49″N 93°17′11″W, built c. 1925
- Bradley's, 109 North Washington Street, 30°50′49″N 93°17′11″W, built c. 1925
- Daniel's Jewelers, now hosting Greater Beauregard Chamber of Commerce, 111 North Washington Street, 30°50′49″N 93°17′11″W, built c. 1925
- Old Lumberman's Bank, 117 North Washington Street, 30°50′50″N 93°17′11″W, built 1913
- Pedal and Splash, 125 North Washington Street, 30°50′51″N 93°17′11″W, built c.1905
- First National Bank, 131 North Washington Street, 30°50′52″N 93°17′11″W, built 1920
- Warehouse #1, 110 Block North Stewart Street, 30°50′50″N 93°17′14″W, built c.1925
- Warehouse #2, 110 Block North Stewart Street, 30°50′49″N 93°17′14″W, built c.1915
- Ridder Vacuum Cleaners and Sewing, 120 West 1st Street, 30°50′48″N 93°17′14″W, built c.1915
- E. Hartt Electrical Appliances/Smitty's Barber Shop, 118 West 1st Street, 30°50′48″N 93°17′13″W, built c. 1905
- Castle Mall, 201 North Washington Street, 30°50′53″N 93°17′11″W, built c.1905. Building no more in existence.
- Rogers Auto Parts, 215 North Washington Street, 30°50′54″N 93°17′11″W, built c.1905.
- Building at 217 North Washington Street, 30°50′54″N 93°17′11″W, built c.1905
- Reichley's Bakery, 219 North Washington Street, 30°50′55″N 93°17′11″W, built c.1905.
- Beauregard News/Reliance Press, 122 Shirley Street, 30°50′53″N 93°17′13″W, built c.1915. Building no more in existence.
- Cleaners, 120 Block Shirley Street, 30°50′53″N 93°17′12″W, built c.1925. Building no more in existence.
- Building at 100 Block Shirley Street, 30°50′53″N 93°17′12″W, built c.1915. Building no more in existence.
- The Railroad Depot, now Beauregard Museum, 120 South Washington Street, 30°50′45″N 93°17′10″W, built 1926.

== See also ==
- Beauregard Parish Courthouse
- Beauregard Parish Jail
