= DeRidder USO Building =

- U.S. National Register of Historic Places
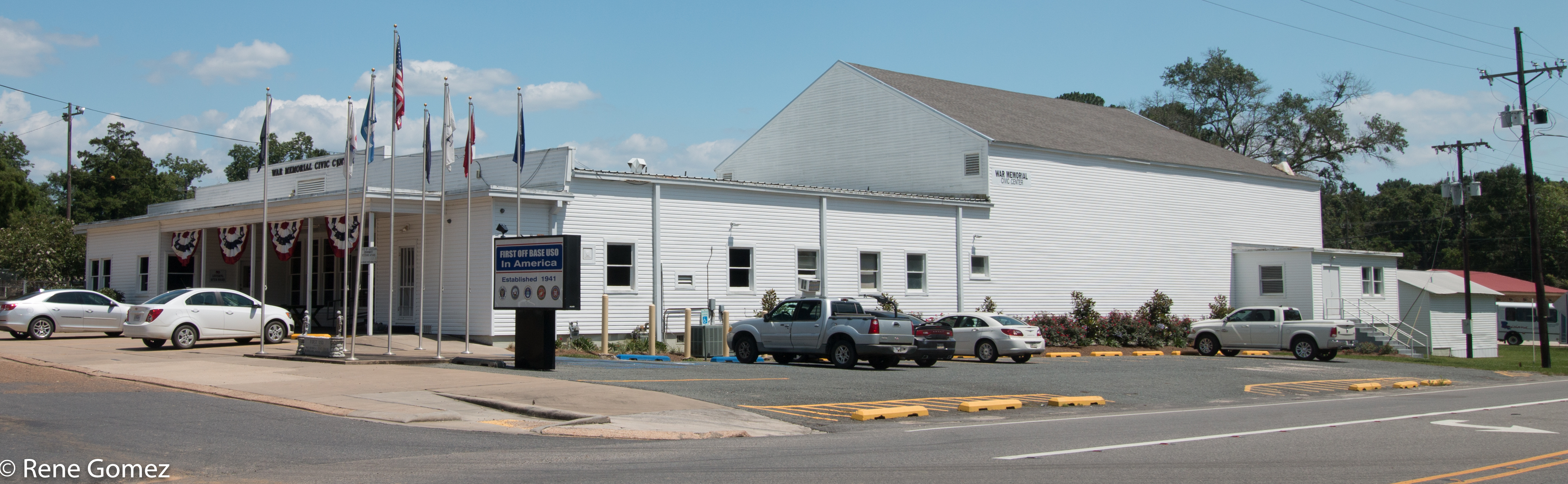

- Location within Louisiana Location within the United States
- Location: 250 West 7th Street, DeRidder, Louisiana
- Coordinates: 30°50′26″N 93°17′19″W
- Area: 1 acre (0.40 ha)
- Built: 1941
- Built by: LeBlanc Brothers
- NRHP reference No.: 92000037
- Added to NRHP: February 25, 1992

The DeRidder USO was built in 1941 for the same reasons as all other United Service Organizations; to provide a relaxing atmosphere to members of the armed forces. The building is located at 250 West Seventh Street and is across the street from the hospital, Beauregard Health System.

== NRHP listing ==
The DeRidder USO building was listed on the National Register of Historic Places on February 25, 1992.

== History ==
The DeRidder USO opened November 28, 1941, was accepted by the United Service Organization on December 1, 1941, and served permanent party and visitor members of the armed services of the United States from DeRidder Army Air Base, as well as Camp Polk.

More than 500 USO's were built for our service men during World War II and some in foreign lands. What sets this one apart is that it was the first USO not built on a military reservation and built specifically for, and donated to, the USO. The second USO in Galveston opened 24 hours later. Civic Center records show that 89,000 soldiers visited the DeRidder USO, 15,000 had showers, and 27,000 saw movies during the time it was an active USO.

== Current ==
The building is now known as the War Memorial Civic Center. Plaques commemorating Generals Bradley, Mark Clark, Eisenhower, Marshall and Patton, along with their pictures, hang on the walls near the entrances of meeting halls named in their honor. The War Room Museum also boasts a Norden bombsight, a very rare item.

== See also ==
- Bay City USO Building, Bay City, Texas, also NRHP-listed
- East Sixth Street USO Building, Hattiesburg, Mississippi, also NRHP-listed
- Hawthorne USO Building, Hawthorne, Nevada, also NRHP-listed
