= Beauregard Parish, Louisiana =

Parish in Louisiana, United States

Beauregard Parish
- Parish
- Parish of Beauregard; Paroisse de Beauregard (French)
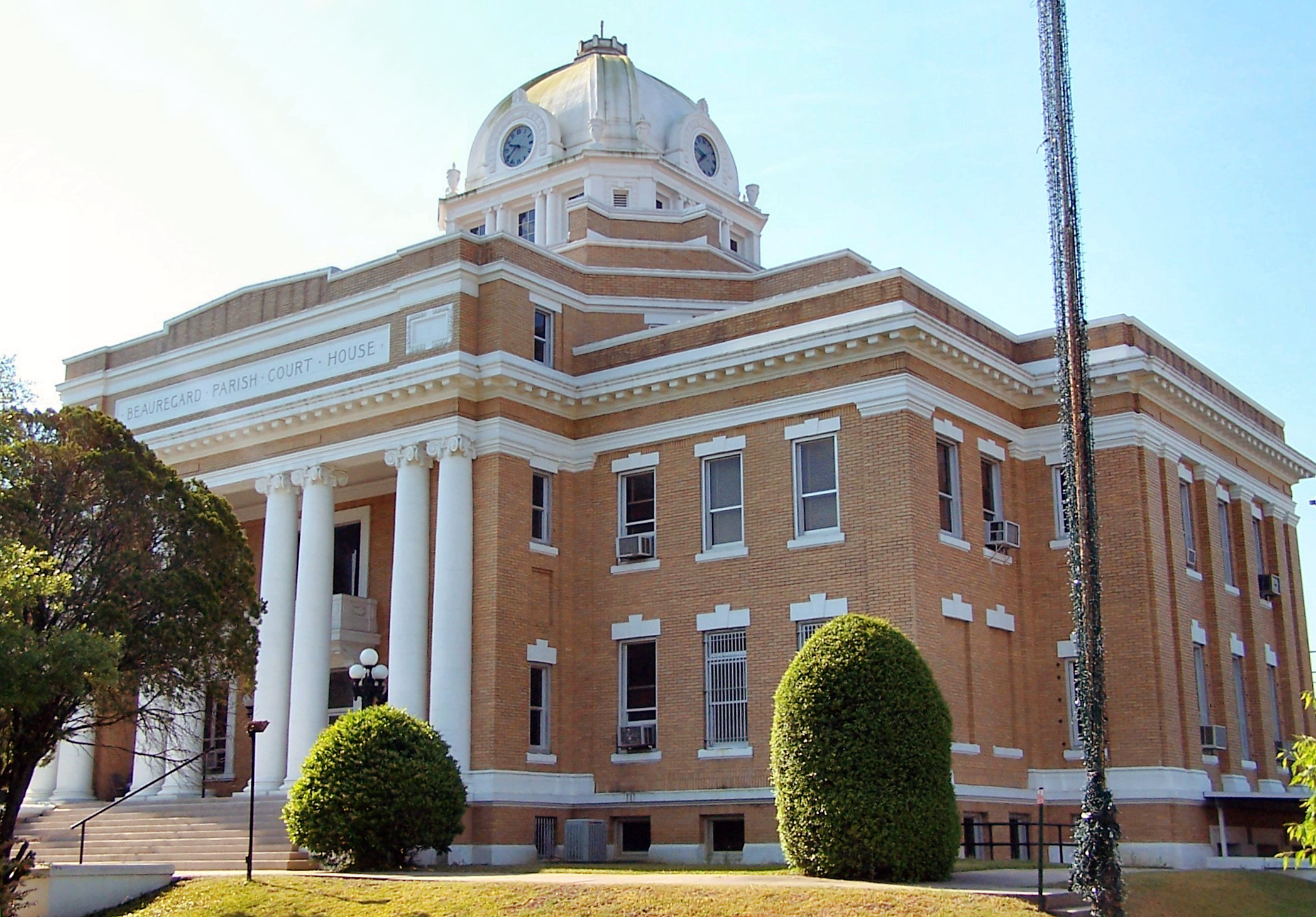
- Beauregard Parish Courthouse in DeRidder

- Flag Seal

- Location within the U.S. state of Louisiana
- Coordinates: 30°39′N 93°20′W
- Country: United States
- State: Louisiana
- Founded: January 1, 1913
- Named for: P. G. T. Beauregard
- Seat: DeRidder
- Largest city: DeRidder

Area
  - Total: 1,166 sq mi (3,020 km^{2})
  - Land: 1,157 sq mi (3,000 km^{2})
  - Water: 8.5 sq mi (22 km^{2}) 0.7%

Population (2020)
  - Total: 36,549
  - Estimate (2025): 36,673 ▲
  - Density: 31.59/sq mi (12.20/km^{2})
- Time zone: UTC−6 (Central)
  - Summer (DST): UTC−5 (CDT)
- Congressional district: 4th
- Website: www.beauparish.org

Beauregard Parish (French: Paroisse de Beauregard) is a parish located in the U.S. state of Louisiana. As of the 2020 census, the population was 36,549. The parish seat and most populous municipality is DeRidder. The parish was formed on January 1, 1913.

Beauregard Parish comprises the DeRidder, LA Micropolitan Statistical Area. The governing body is by the police jury system.

== History ==
=== Spanish and French rule ===
Until 1762, the land that would eventually become Beauregard Parish was a part of the Spanish holdings in Louisiana, as, at that time, the border between Spain and France was acknowledged as the Rio Hondo (now known as the Calcasieu river); however the land between the Rio Hondo and the Sabine river was in some dispute as the French were beginning to occupy land on the west side of the Rio Hondo. In 1762, King Louis XV of France secretly gave Louisiana to Spain in the Treaty of Fontainebleau. From 1762 to 1800, the region was a part of New Spain. In 1800, the secret Third Treaty of San Ildefonso transferred possession of Louisiana back to the French, although Spain continued to administer the land until 1803. In this period, the only European settlers to the land that would become Beauregard Parish were a few individuals with Spanish land grants.

=== Neutral Ground ===
After the Louisiana Purchase by the United States in 1803, the region stretching from the Sabine River in the west to the Calcasieu River in the east was claimed by both Spain and the United States, leading to little law enforcement by either country. In order to avoid a war over the border, the two countries agreed that the land in contention would remain neutral and free of armed forces from either side. The area became known as the Neutral Ground or the Sabine Free State. During this period, the armies in the area—those of the United States and Spain—allowed the running of a ferry, enabling places such as Burr's Ferry in Vernon Parish, to prosper. The rest of the area was lawless, except for the occasional joint military venture to rid the area of "undesirables". However, even with the border dispute, several pioneers did settle the land during this period and were eventually given 3rd class homestead claims. The Adams-Onís Treaty, signed in 1819 and ratified in 1821, recognized the U.S. claim, setting the final Louisiana western border at the Sabine River.

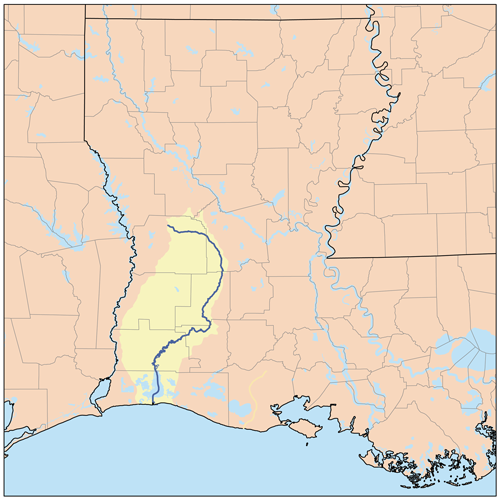
The Calcasieu River formed part of the eastern boundary of the Neutral Ground.

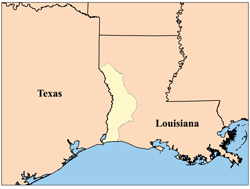
The Neutral Ground, or Sabine Free State. Its western border was the Sabine River.

=== Parish origin ===
In 1804, the United States organized present-day Louisiana as the Territory of Orleans. In 1805, the territory was further divided into 12 counties. Opelousas County included the entire southwestern section of the state and extended almost to the Mississippi River in the northeast. By 1807, the counties were reorganized into parishes. St. Landry was one of the original nineteen civil parishes established by the Louisiana Legislature. St. Landry was the largest parish in Louisiana, called the Imperial St. Landry Parish. For a short period after the fall of New Orleans during the Civil War, Opelousas was not just the county seat but was the state capitol (until it was permanently moved to Baton Rouge). Calcasieu Parish was created on March 24, 1840, from the western portion of Saint Landry Parish. Calcasieu Parish has since been divided into five smaller parishes. The original area of Calcasieu Parish was called Imperial Calcasieu Parish.

The bill to create Beauregard Parish out of the northern area of Imperial Calcasieu Parish was passed in 1912 and took effect at the beginning of 1913. The Parish was named after P.G.T. Beauregard, a Confederate general.

=== Parish organization ===
Although one faction wanted the town of Singer to be the parish seat, DeRidder was chosen by a majority of voters on October 15, 1912. (Today, the unincorporated community of Singer still exists and includes a post office, store, and school.) The parish was organized with a police jury as the governing body. Interim, county-wide police jury, judge and justice were appointed. However, on December 3, 1912, an election was held for the offices of sheriff, clerk of court, assessor, coroner, superintendent of public education, police juror, justice of the peace, constable, and members of the school board in each of the wards in the parish.

=== Native Americans ===
At least four tribes lived in Beauregard Parish around the time it was founded. One was about six miles south of Sugartown on Indian Branch, another was just north of the old W.B. Welborn home on Bundick Creek, another was along the mouth of Anacoco Creek, and another at Merryville, across the street from where Merryville High School now stands.

=== The 1941 military build-up ===
On November 28, 1941, a United Service Organizations was opened in DeRidder. (Of the more than 500 USOs opened during WW II, this was the first off-post USO to open in the U.S.) 89,000 soldiers visited the DeRidder USO; 15,000 took showers; and 27,000 viewed movies. The building was entered into the National Register of Historic Places on February 25, 1992.

August through September 1941 saw the locally stationed military engaged in the Louisiana Maneuvers—the largest military maneuver in United States history (with more than 500,000 soldiers training for war). The rapid influx of so many military personnel created problems that stemmed, in part, from alcohol overconsumption. In response, residents of Beauregard Parish voted to become a dry parish.

== Law enforcement ==
The parish level police agency is the Beauregard Parish Sheriff's Office. The current Sheriff (2020)is Mark V. Herford

The city level police agencies of the area are the "DeRidder Police Department" founded in the year (1903) and is currently under the direction of Chief Craig Richard.

The only other city police department of Beauregard Parish is the Merryville Police Department founded in the year (1912) and is currently under the direction of Chief Cindy Brister.

== Geography ==
According to the U.S. Census Bureau, the parish has a total area of 1,166 square miles (3,020 km^{2}), of which 1,157 square miles (3,000 km^{2}) is land and 8.5 square miles (22 km^{2}) (0.7%) is water.

=== Major highways ===
- U.S. Highway 171
- U.S. Highway 190
- Louisiana Highway 12
- Louisiana Highway 26
- Louisiana Highway 27
- Louisiana Highway 109
- Louisiana Highway 110
- Louisiana Highway 111
- Louisiana Highway 112
- Louisiana Highway 113
- Louisiana Highway 389
- Louisiana Highway 394
- Louisiana Highway 399
- Louisiana Highway 1146
- Louisiana Highway 1147
- Louisiana Highway 3099
- Louisiana Highway 3226

=== Adjacent counties and parishes ===
- Vernon Parish (north)
- Allen Parish (east)
- Jefferson Davis Parish (southeast)
- Calcasieu Parish (south)
- Newton County, Texas (west)

== Demographics ==
Historical population
| Census | Pop. | Note | %± |
|---|---|---|---|
| 1920 | 20,767 | | — |
| 1930 | 14,569 | | −29.8% |
| 1940 | 14,847 | | 1.9% |
| 1950 | 17,766 | | 19.7% |
| 1960 | 19,191 | | 8.0% |
| 1970 | 22,888 | | 19.3% |
| 1980 | 29,692 | | 29.7% |
| 1990 | 30,083 | | 1.3% |
| 2000 | 32,986 | | 9.6% |
| 2010 | 35,654 | | 8.1% |
| 2020 | 36,549 | | 2.5% |
| 2025 (est.) | 36,673 | ▲ | 0.3% |
U.S. Decennial Census; 1790-1960 1900-1990; 1990-2000 2010

=== 2020 census ===
As of the 2020 census, there were 36,549 people, 13,797 households, and 9,219 families residing in the parish. The median age was 39.0 years, while 24.8% of residents were under the age of 18 and 16.7% of residents were 65 years of age or older. For every 100 females there were 102.9 males, and for every 100 females age 18 and over there were 100.7 males age 18 and over.

There were 13,797 households in the parish, of which 33.4% had children under the age of 18 living in them. Of all households, 51.0% were married-couple households, 18.1% were households with a male householder and no spouse or partner present, and 25.8% were households with a female householder and no spouse or partner present. About 26.2% of all households were made up of individuals and 12.5% had someone living alone who was 65 years of age or older.

There were 15,771 housing units, of which 12.5% were vacant. Among occupied housing units, 79.0% were owner-occupied and 21.0% were renter-occupied. The homeowner vacancy rate was 1.3% and the rental vacancy rate was 9.2%.

27.0% of residents lived in urban areas, while 73.0% lived in rural areas.

The racial makeup of the parish was 80.8% White, 11.2% Black or African American, 0.8% American Indian and Alaska Native, 0.6% Asian, 0.1% Native Hawaiian and Pacific Islander, 1.0% from some other race, and 5.4% from two or more races, with Hispanic or Latino residents of any race comprising 3.5% of the population.

=== Racial and ethnic composition ===
Beauregard Parish, Louisiana – Racial and ethnic composition Note: the US Census treats Hispanic/Latino as an ethnic category. This table excludes Latinos from the racial categories and assigns them to a separate category. Hispanics/Latinos may be of any race.
| Race / Ethnicity (NH = Non-Hispanic) | Pop 1980 | Pop 1990 | Pop 2000 | Pop 2010 | Pop 2020 | % 1980 | % 1990 | % 2000 | % 2010 | % 2020 |
|---|---|---|---|---|---|---|---|---|---|---|
| White alone (NH) | 24,524 | 24,965 | 27,513 | 28,730 | 29,039 | 82.59% | 82.99% | 83.41% | 80.58% | 79.45% |
| Black or African American alone (NH) | 4,727 | 4,449 | 4,229 | 4,597 | 4,082 | 15.92% | 14.79% | 12.82% | 12.89% | 11.17% |
| Native American or Alaska Native alone (NH) | 27 | 114 | 209 | 326 | 273 | 0.09% | 0.38% | 0.63% | 0.91% | 0.75% |
| Asian alone (NH) | 82 | 131 | 189 | 217 | 222 | 0.28% | 0.44% | 0.57% | 0.61% | 0.61% |
| Native Hawaiian or Pacific Islander alone (NH) | x | x | 16 | 16 | 27 | x | x | 0.05% | 0.04% | 0.07% |
| Other race alone (NH) | 18 | 7 | 13 | 41 | 91 | 0.06% | 0.02% | 0.04% | 0.11% | 0.25% |
| Mixed race or Multiracial (NH) | x | x | 349 | 724 | 1,544 | x | x | 1.06% | 2.03% | 4.22% |
| Hispanic or Latino (any race) | 314 | 417 | 468 | 1,003 | 1,271 | 1.06% | 1.39% | 1.42% | 2.81% | 3.48% |
| Total | 29,692 | 30,083 | 32,986 | 35,654 | 36,549 | 100.00% | 100.00% | 100.00% | 100.00% | 100.00% |

== Education ==
Beauregard Parish School Board operates the parish public schools.

It is in the service area of Sowela Technical Community College.

== National Guard ==
The A Company, 3-156th Infantry Battalion is based in De Ridder. This unit deployed to Iraq twice as part of the 256th IBCT, in 2004-5 and 2010.

== Communities ==
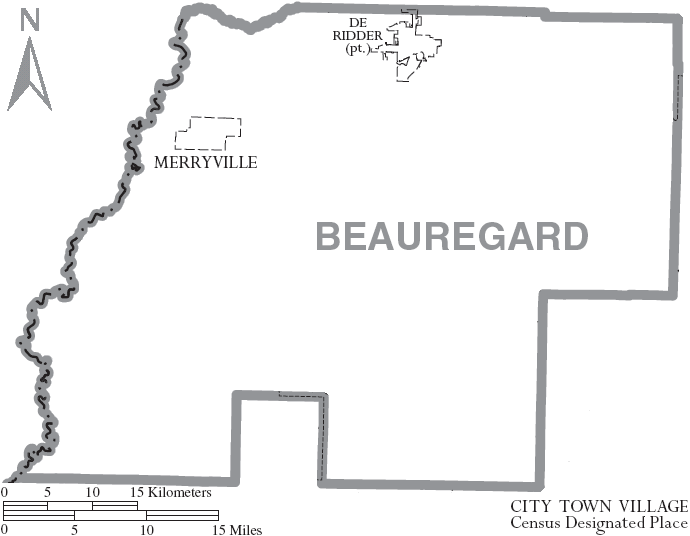
Map of Beauregard Parish, Louisiana, with town labels

=== City ===
- DeRidder (parish seat and largest municipality)

=== Town ===
- Merryville

=== Unincorporated areas ===
==== Census-designated places ====
- Longville
- Oretta
- Singer
- Sugartown

==== Unincorporated communities ====
- Dry Creek
- Graybow
- Junction
- Ragley
- Wye

== National Register of Historic Places ==
There are 12 places listed on the National Register of Historic Places including the Beauregard Parish Courthouse, the Beauregard Parish Jail, the Beauregard Parish Training School, the DeRidder Commercial Historic District and the Burks House. See National Register of Historic Places listings in Beauregard Parish, Louisiana.

== Politics ==
Beauregard Parish was a Democratic stronghold at the time of its founding, and it remained so until the 1950s, when it became a swing Parish. In 1984 it supported Republican Ronald Reagan and has remained in the Republican column since. From 2004 onward through 2024, every presidential election has broken the previous record for the strongest Republican performance in Parish history.

United States presidential election results for Beauregard Parish, Louisiana
| Year | Republican | | Democratic | | Third party(ies) | |
| Year | No. | % | No. | % | No. | % |
|---|---|---|---|---|---|---|
| 1916 | 59 | 5.73% | 968 | 94.07% | 2 | 0.19% |
| 1920 | 202 | 14.83% | 1,146 | 84.14% | 14 | 1.03% |
| 1924 | 235 | 16.47% | 1,191 | 83.46% | 1 | 0.07% |
| 1928 | 468 | 23.62% | 1,513 | 76.38% | 0 | 0.00% |
| 1932 | 146 | 5.92% | 2,319 | 94.08% | 0 | 0.00% |
| 1936 | 549 | 20.11% | 2,181 | 79.89% | 0 | 0.00% |
| 1940 | 528 | 16.47% | 2,677 | 83.53% | 0 | 0.00% |
| 1944 | 759 | 25.43% | 2,226 | 74.57% | 0 | 0.00% |
| 1948 | 449 | 12.93% | 1,653 | 47.60% | 1,371 | 39.48% |
| 1952 | 789 | 44.20% | 996 | 55.80% | 0 | 0.00% |
| 1956 | 2,711 | 52.68% | 2,276 | 44.23% | 159 | 3.09% |
| 1960 | 2,432 | 40.77% | 2,903 | 48.67% | 630 | 10.56% |
| 1964 | 3,349 | 52.34% | 3,049 | 47.66% | 0 | 0.00% |
| 1968 | 1,615 | 22.33% | 1,569 | 21.70% | 4,048 | 55.97% |
| 1972 | 4,955 | 69.41% | 1,728 | 24.21% | 456 | 6.39% |
| 1976 | 3,196 | 36.38% | 5,322 | 60.57% | 268 | 3.05% |
| 1980 | 5,250 | 47.47% | 5,556 | 50.24% | 253 | 2.29% |
| 1984 | 7,353 | 63.13% | 4,199 | 36.05% | 96 | 0.82% |
| 1988 | 6,466 | 57.30% | 4,704 | 41.69% | 114 | 1.01% |
| 1992 | 5,119 | 40.79% | 5,037 | 40.13% | 2,395 | 19.08% |
| 1996 | 5,526 | 44.21% | 4,925 | 39.40% | 2,048 | 16.39% |
| 2000 | 7,862 | 64.42% | 3,958 | 32.43% | 385 | 3.15% |
| 2004 | 9,470 | 71.30% | 3,666 | 27.60% | 145 | 1.09% |
| 2008 | 10,718 | 76.15% | 3,071 | 21.82% | 285 | 2.03% |
| 2012 | 11,112 | 78.12% | 2,828 | 19.88% | 285 | 2.00% |
| 2016 | 12,238 | 81.16% | 2,393 | 15.87% | 447 | 2.96% |
| 2020 | 13,575 | 82.99% | 2,542 | 15.54% | 240 | 1.47% |
| 2024 | 13,504 | 85.07% | 2,192 | 13.81% | 178 | 1.12% |

== See also ==
- Louisiana (New France)
