= Police jury =

Form of local government in Louisiana

In the U.S. state of Louisiana, the most common type of governing body for a parish is the police jury (French: le jury de police). Louisiana is divided into parishes for units of local government, similar to the counties in other states. Initially, all parishes used the police jury system. Many have transitioned to other forms of government, especially after the 1974 state constitution granted the parishes more autonomy. In general, the more rural areas still use this older system.

The police jury is a legislative and executive body. Parishes are divided into wards or districts. These each elect a "juror" to the assembly. The jurors elect a police jury president as their chairman. The president presides over the police jury and serves as the titular head of the parish government. Police juries range in size, depending on population, from three to over fifteen members. Wide latitude is given to organize and administer parish business.

== Etymology ==
A police jury was called a "police assembly" initially. A law passed on April 6, 1807, created groups in each parish to handle the "local police and administration of their parish". Three years later, these were officially defined as "police juries" and given specific roles. The name "jury" comes from two aspects of the original police juries. The groups were the same size as grand juries and were presided over by the parish judge.

== History ==
The police jury system was introduced when the area was the Territory of Orleans. Two years after the Louisiana Purchase, the newly formed legislative council divided the territory into 12 counties. These counties proved unmanageable, and the legislature reverted to using the smaller Catholic parishes, defined in 1762 as "the farthest area that the priest could ride on horseback, within reason, to go to the outlying churches to conduct a mass once a month".

In 1810, the office of sheriff was created for each parish, and the police jury was officially defined one year later. The original format had the parish judge presiding over the police jury, but this was quickly replaced with a police jury president, elected by the jurors from among their members. In 1813, the parishes were subdivided into wards, each electing one juror.

The Territory of Orleans had a different cultural background than other states and no experience with representative government. The juries started with limited powers and an explicit mandate to maintain and regulate infrastructure, alcohol consumption, and slavery. Their role would grow to encompass over fifty government functions. The 1974 State Constitution granted more autonomy to cities and parishes. This shifted from delegated authority where parishes could only do what was explicitly permitted, to "home rule" where the local government could do anything not explicitly prohibited. Many parishes chose to transition away and drafted home rule charters, defining the structure, powers, and limits of their local government.

== Functions ==
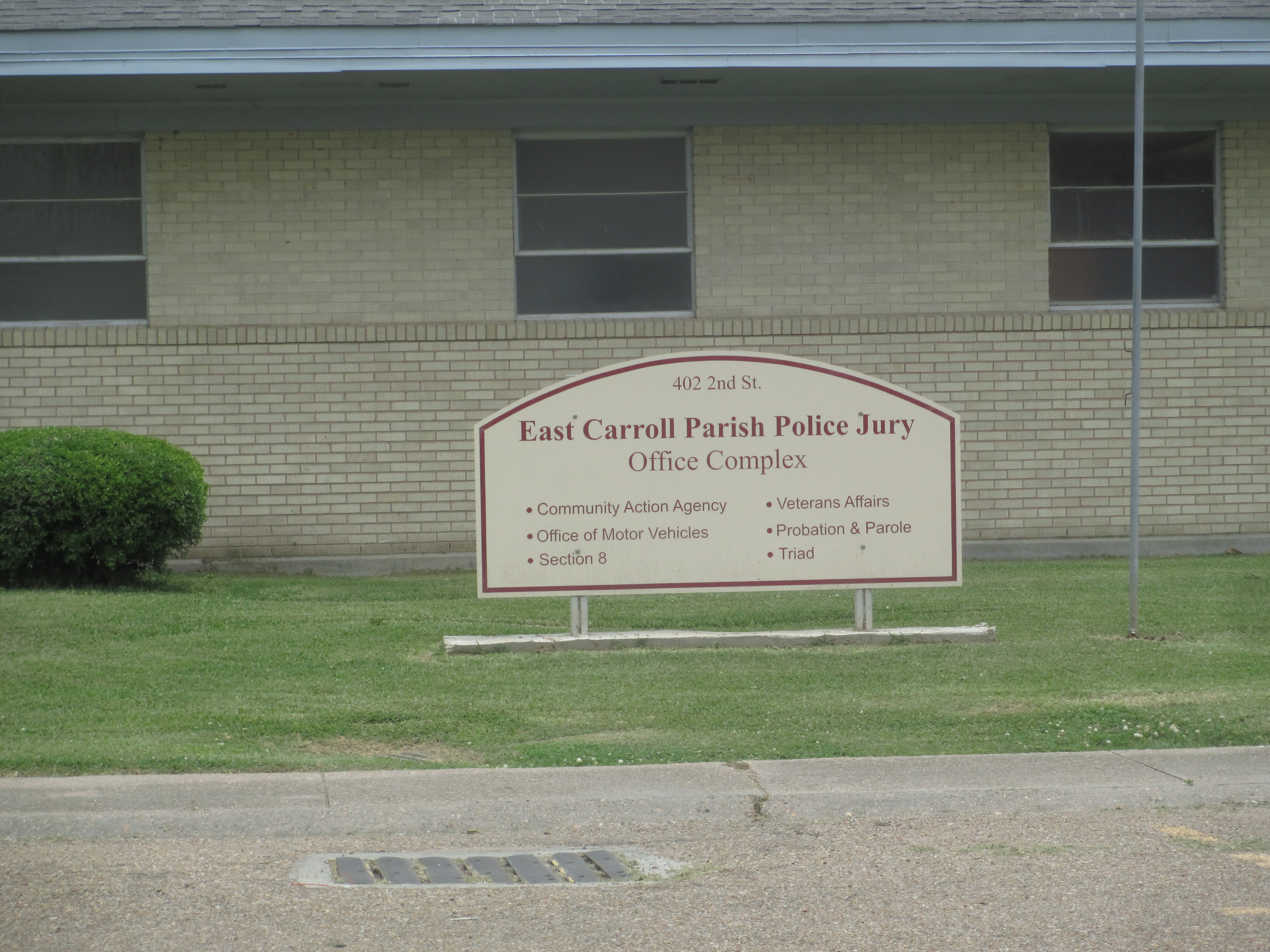
East Carroll Parish Police Jury office complex in Lake Providence, Louisiana

In Louisiana, the level of government between the city and state is the parish, comparable to the counties used by other US states. The police jury handles the executive and legislative functions of the parish government. The parishes are divided into wards or districts. These each elect a "juror" to the assembly. The assembly's size varies depending on the population, from three members in some rural parishes to over fifteen. The jurors elect a "police jury president" from among their members. Like other elections in Louisiana, parish elections typically occur in odd-numbered years and use the open primary system.

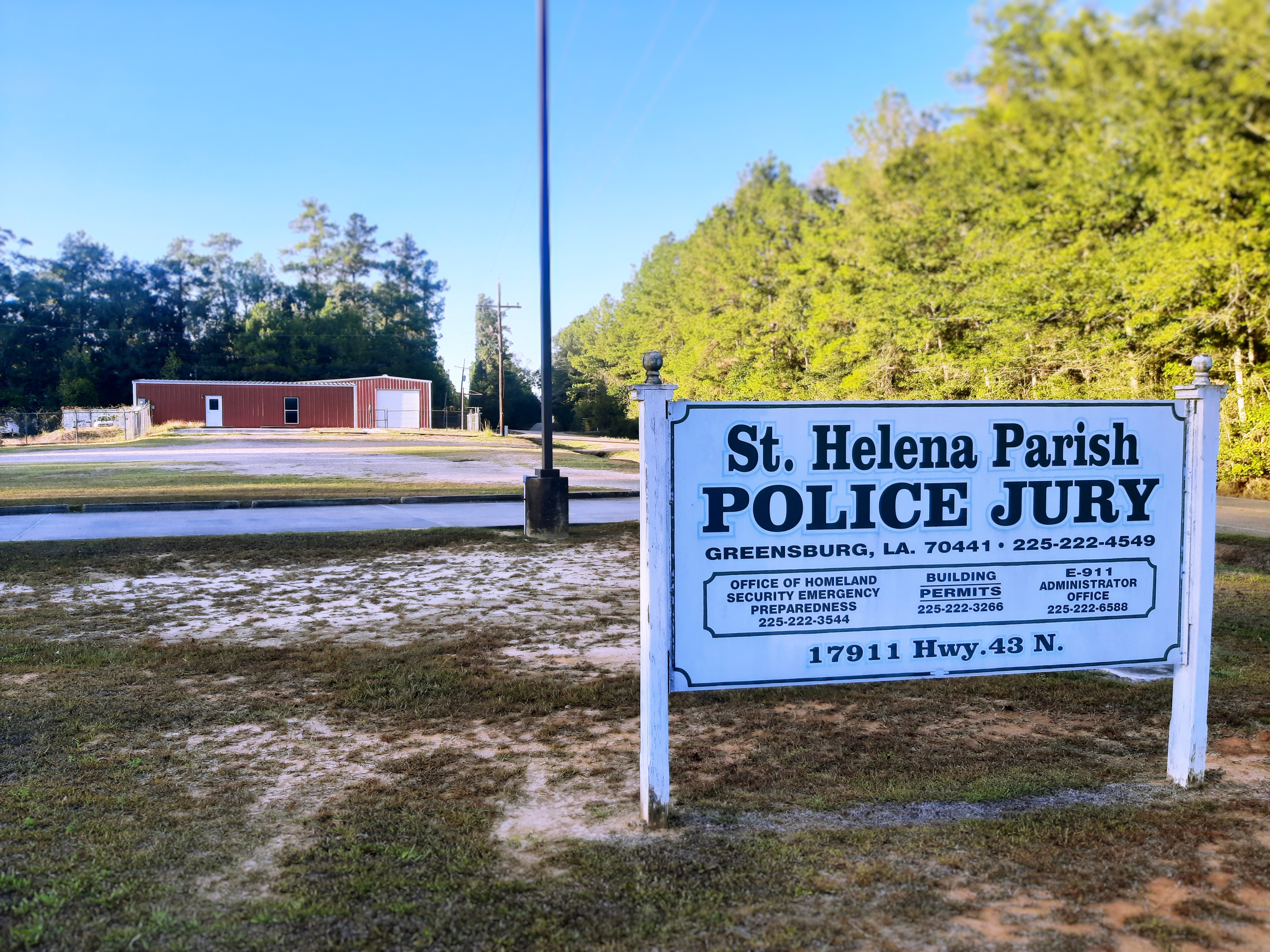
St. Helena Parish Police Jury, maintenance department in background

While originally narrow in scope and only holding powers delegated by the state, modern police juries have broad authority to take actions approved by the voters. According to the Police Jury Association of Louisiana, responsibilities include road maintenance, construction of prisons, waste disposal, bridge construction, fire protection, maintaining the courts plus other parish offices, promoting tourism, and regulating local businesses. They can also create ordinances and enforce them via fines in civil court. To receive state funding, police juries are required to assign road maintenance to a centralized program to prevent conflicts of interest. Police juries also administer state and federal programs at the local level.

== Forms of parish government ==
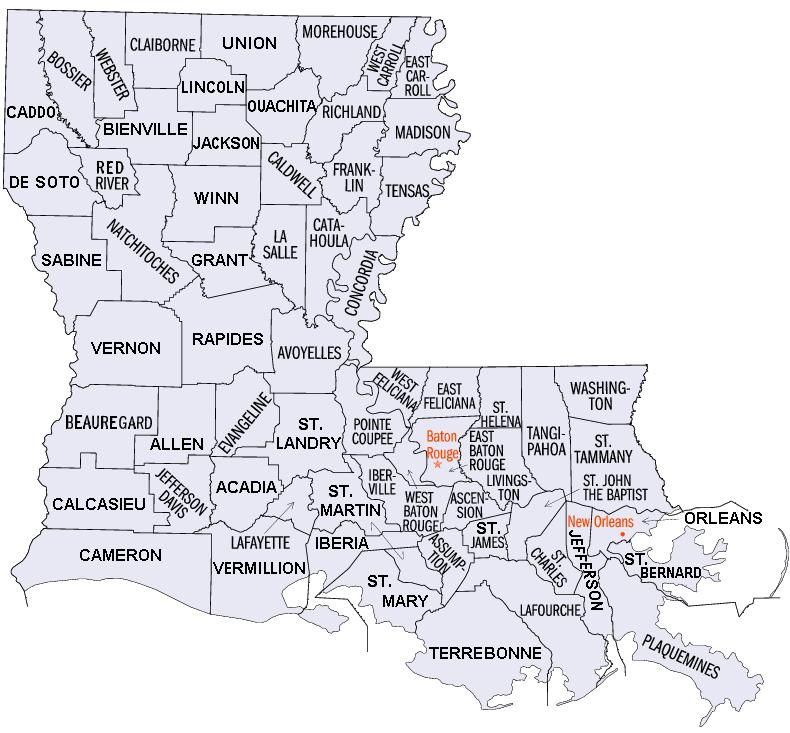
Map of Louisiana's 64 parishes

The police jury is the most common form of parish government in Louisiana. Many parishes, especially those with large municipalities and suburban areas, have converted away from the system, although some parishes with large cities still use the police jury, including Bossier (Bossier City), Calcasieu (Lake Charles), Ouachita (Monroe) and Rapides (Alexandria).

Twenty-six Louisiana parishes are governed by home rule charters that allow them to pick a different form of government. These include council-president, council-manager, and consolidated parish/city. Under a council-president system, voters elect an executive president and a legislative council separately. With the council-manager system, voters elect a parish council, which hires a professional manager to run the day-to-day government. A consolidated government combines the parish with the local city government, and voters typically elect a separate council and executive. For example, since 1949 the state's capital city and its containing parish have used a consolidated government headed by a mayor-president.

Local government of each parish
Parish	Type of government
Acadia	police jury
Allen	police jury
Assumption	police jury
Avoyelles	police jury
Beauregard	police jury
Bienville	police jury
Bossier	police jury
Calcasieu	police jury
Caldwell	police jury
Cameron	police jury
Catahoula	police jury
Claiborne	police jury
Concordia	police jury
DeSoto	police jury
East Carroll	police jury
East Feliciana	police jury
Evangeline	police jury
Franklin	police jury
Grant	police jury
Jackson	police jury
Jefferson Davis	police jury
La Salle	police jury
Lincoln	police jury
Madison	police jury
Morehouse	police jury
Ouachita	police jury
Rapides	police jury
Red River	police jury
Richland	police jury
Sabine	police jury
St. Helena	police jury
Tensas	police jury
Union	police jury
Vermillion	police jury
Vernon	police jury
Webster	police jury
West Carroll	police jury
Winn	police jury
Ascension	council-president
Iberia	council-president
Iberville	council-president
Jefferson	council-president
Lafourche	council-president
Livingston	council-president
Natchitoches	council-president
Plaquemines	council-president
Pointe Coupee	council-president
St. Bernard	council-president
St. Charles	council-president
St. James	council-president
St. John the Baptist	council-president
St. Landry	council-president
St. Martin	council-president
St. Mary	council-president
St. Tammany	council-president
Tangipahoa	council-president
Washington	council-president
West Baton Rouge	council-president
West Feliciana	council-president
Orleans Parish & New Orleans	consolidated
East Baton Rouge Parish & Baton Rouge	consolidated
Lafayette Parish & Lafayette	consolidated
Terrebonne Parish & Houma	consolidated
Caddo Parish	council manager

^{Sources:}

== See also ==
- County commission
- County council
