= Bancroft, Louisiana =

Coordinates: 30°33′55″N 93°41′08″W

Bancroft is an unincorporated area in Louisiana. It is in Beauregard Parish near the border with Texas.

The North Bancroft Field is a geological area dating to the Eocene era that was drilled for oil. Bancroft was a lumber settlement that had 250 men at it. It had a post office. Bancroft Colored School served grades 1 to 8. The school serving the area became 68 percent African American after integration. Spikes Cemetery is in Bancroft.

In 2021 the old school building in Bancroft was still standing.
