= Singer, Louisiana =

- Census-designated place & Unincorporated community
- Location within Louisiana Location within the United States
- Coordinates: 30°39′18″N 93°24′45″W
- Country: United States
- State: Louisiana
- Parish: Beauregard

Area
  - Total: 6.95 sq mi (17.99 km^{2})
  - Land: 6.95 sq mi (17.99 km^{2})
  - Water: 0 sq mi (0.00 km^{2})
- Elevation: 148 ft (45 m)

Population (2020)
  - Total: 303
  - Density: 43.6/sq mi (16.84/km^{2})
- Time zone: UTC-6 (Central (CST))
  - Summer (DST): UTC-5 (CDT)
- Area code: 337
- GNIS feature ID: 539395

Singer is an unincorporated community and census-designated place in Beauregard Parish, Louisiana, United States. Its population was 303 as of the 2020 census. Its ZIP code is 70660.

== Demographics ==
Historical population
Census	Pop.	Note	%±
2010	287		—
2020	303		5.6%
U.S. Decennial Census

Singer was first listed as a census designated place in the 2010 U.S. census.

== Notable native ==
- Gil Dozier, Louisiana Commissioner of Agriculture and Forestry from 1976 to 1989. Interred at Newlin Cemetery in Singer.
