= Beauregard Parish Jail =

- U.S. National Register of Historic Places
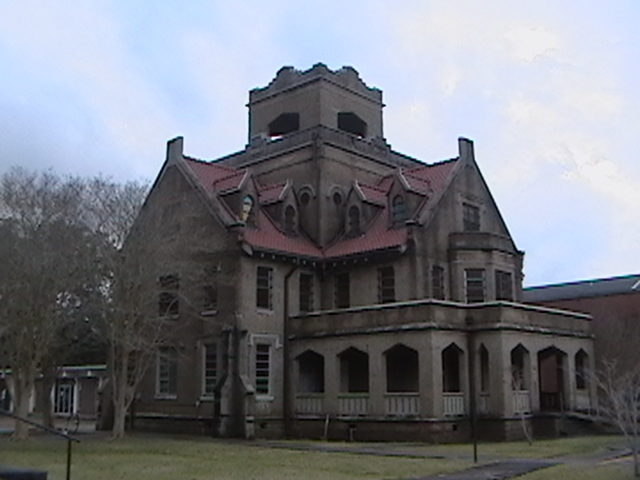

- Location within Louisiana Location within the United States
- Location: 205 West 1st Street, DeRidder, Louisiana
- Coordinates: 30°50′47″N 93°17′18″W
- Area: 0.2 acres (0.081 ha)
- Built: 1914
- Architects: Stevens and Nelson
- Architectural style: Collegiate Gothic
- NRHP reference No.: 81000711
- Added to NRHP: December 17, 1981

Beauregard Parish Jail is a former jailhouse in DeRidder, Louisiana, built in 1914 in the Gothic Revival architecture style. It is referred to as the Gothic jail or the Hanging jail. The jail is owned by the Beauregard Parish Police Jury. The Beauregard Parish Rehabilitation Committee serves under the direction of the Police Jury with the primary duty of the preserving the jail. The Beauregard Tourist Commission has a vested interest in the jail and other historic sites and has been involved in many aspects of securing a continued future of the jail.

The jail was listed on the National Register of Historic Places on December 17, 1981.

== History ==
The Hudson River Lumber Company donated a tract of land to the City of DeRidder for a courthouse and jail. The newly formed Beauregard Parish Police Jury, carved out of the old Imperial Calcasieu Parish, purchased the property and a building from the church. Stevens-Nelson of New Orleans designed a courthouse and jail. Falls City Construction Company was awarded the contract in September 1913. Both buildings were completed in 1915 at a cost of $168,000.

=== Notoriety ===
"J. J. Brevelle was a taxi driver who was murdered by his "fares" while taking them to a rural destination. Brevelle is buried in Woodlawn Cemetery. The two men who were found guilty of his murder were hanged in the old parish jail on March 9, 1928. Deputy Sheriff's Jim Crumpler and Gill were the hangmen. Joe Genna, age 25, was pronounced dead at 1:06 PM and Molton Brasseaux at 1:29 PM. Neither man was buried in Beauregard Parish."

It was after this incident, the Beauregard Parish Jail, sometimes referred to as the Gothic jail, also became known as the Hanging Jail

== Culture ==
The structure not only made history because of its unique design but also because there was a toilet, shower, lavatory, and window in each cell. A large spiral staircase gave access to each cell. Architectural historian Johnathan Fricker stated, "The old jail is unique in structure, it has the possible distinction of being the only penal institution in the country using "Collegiate Gothic" design in the first decade of the 20th century." The jail could "house" over 50 prisoners. There was a jailers' quarters on the bottom floor as well as a kitchen. There is a tunnel leading from the courthouse to the jail that was used to transport prisoners for trial.

=== Current ===
The building is currently not in use. Options are being explored as to current plans for the jail. On August 2, 2007, the Beauregard Tourist Commission submitted the building (noted as Beauregard Parish Jail "Gothic Jail") for inclusion in the Louisiana Preservation Alliance's annual Ten Most Endangered List. This will open new avenues for funding for the building. Negotiations are underway for the jail to be used in an up-coming movie.

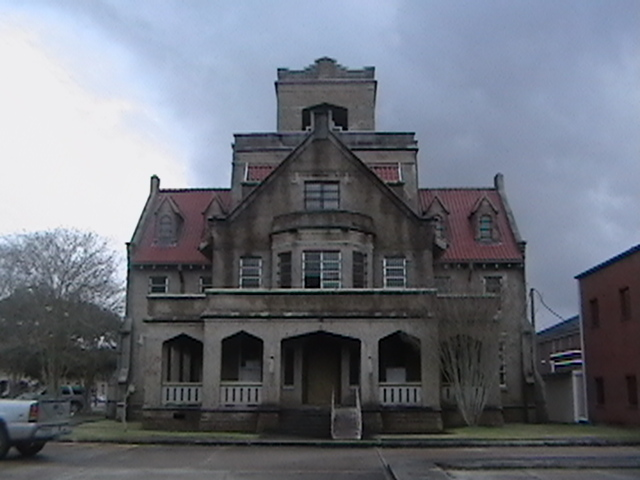

== In the media ==
=== Television ===
The Beauregard Parish Jail (known as the Gothic Jail) was featured as a haunted location on the paranormal TV series, Most Terrifying Places, which aired on the Travel Channel in 2019.

The Beauregard Parish Jail (known as the Gothic Jail) was featured as a haunted location on the paranormal TV series, Ghost Brothers: Lights Out, which aired on the Discovery+ on April 17, 2021.

It was also featured in an Episode of Achievement Haunter in 2018.

=== Film ===
An edited version of The Beauregard Parish Jail was featured in the movie Eli, which released on Netflix on October 18, 2019.

== See also ==
- Old St. Helena Parish Jail: NRHP-listed in Greensburg, Louisiana
- National Register of Historic Places listings in Beauregard Parish, Louisiana
