= Longville, Louisiana =

Coordinates: 30°36′19″N 93°13′55″W

Longville is a census-designated place in Beauregard Parish, Louisiana, United States. As of the 2020 census, Longville had a population of 545. Longville has four schools: South Beauregard Lower Elementary, South Beauregard Upper Elementary, South Beauregard Junior High, and South Beauregard High School, which are all on one campus.

== Demographics ==
Historical population
| Census | Pop. | Note | %± |
|---|---|---|---|
| 2010 | 635 | | — |
| 2020 | 545 | | −14.2% |
U.S. Decennial Census

Longville was first listed as a census designated place in the 2010 U.S. census.
