= Merryville, Louisiana =

- Town
- Location of Merryville in Beauregard Parish, Louisiana.

- Location of Louisiana in the United States
- Coordinates: 30°45′14″N 93°32′13″W
- Country: United States
- State: Louisiana
- Parish: Beauregard

Area
  - Total: 9.81 sq mi (25.40 km^{2})
  - Land: 9.79 sq mi (25.35 km^{2})
  - Water: 0.019 sq mi (0.05 km^{2})
- Elevation: 82 ft (25 m)

Population (2020)
  - Total: 967
  - Density: 98.8/sq mi (38.14/km^{2})
- Time zone: UTC-6 (CST)
  - Summer (DST): UTC-5 (CDT)
- ZIP code: 70653
- Area code: 337
- FIPS code: 22-50010
- GNIS feature ID: 2406149
- Website: www.merryvillelouisiana.com

Merryville is a town in Beauregard Parish, Louisiana, United States. As of the 2020 census, Merryville had a population of 967. It is part of the DeRidder Micropolitan Statistical Area.

== Geography ==
U.S. Route 190 passes through the community, leading north and east 19 miles (31 km) to DeRidder, the parish seat, and west 18 miles (29 km) to Newton, Texas. The Sabine River, which forms the border between Texas and Louisiana, is 4 miles (6 km) west of the center of Merryville.

According to the United States Census Bureau, the town has a total area of 9.8 square miles (25.4 km^{2}).

== Demographics ==
Historical population
Census	Pop.	Note	%±
1920	2,963		—
1930	2,626		−11.4%
1940	1,216		−53.7%
1950	1,383		13.7%
1960	1,232		−10.9%
1970	1,286		4.4%
1980	1,286		0.0%
1990	1,235		−4.0%
2000	1,126		−8.8%
2010	1,103		−2.0%
2020	967		−12.3%
2025 (est.)	950	▼	−1.8%
U.S. Decennial Census

As of the census of 2000, there were 1,126 people, 418 households, and 300 families residing in the town. The population density was 138.0 inhabitants per square mile (53.3/km^{2}). There were 482 housing units at an average density of 59.1 per square mile (22.8/km^{2}). The racial makeup of the town was 82.06% White, 15.19% African American, 1.24% Native American, 0.09% Asian, 0.27% from other races, and 1.15% from two or more races. Hispanic or Latino of any race were 3.46% of the population.

There were 418 households, out of which 34.9% had children under the age of 18 living with them, 50.2% were married couples living together, 17.7% had a female householder with no husband present, and 28.2% were non-families. 27.0% of all households were made up of individuals, and 10.8% had someone living alone who was 65 years of age or older. The average household size was 2.55 and the average family size was 3.10.

In the town, the population was spread out, with 28.0% under the age of 18, 9.4% from 18 to 24, 24.3% from 25 to 44, 21.8% from 45 to 64, and 16.4% who were 65 years of age or older. The median age was 36 years. For every 100 females, there were 81.0 males. For every 100 females age 18 and over, there were 78.2 males.

The median income for a household in the town was $22,500, and the median income for a family was $30,962. Males had a median income of $30,250 versus $18,672 for females. The per capita income for the town was $14,055. About 24.8% of families and 28.3% of the population were below the poverty line, including 34.8% of those under age 18 and 29.0% of those age 65 or over.

== Notable people ==
- Red Cagle
- Lether Frazar
- Sam H. Jones
- Jesse Knowles
