= DeRidder, Louisiana =

- City
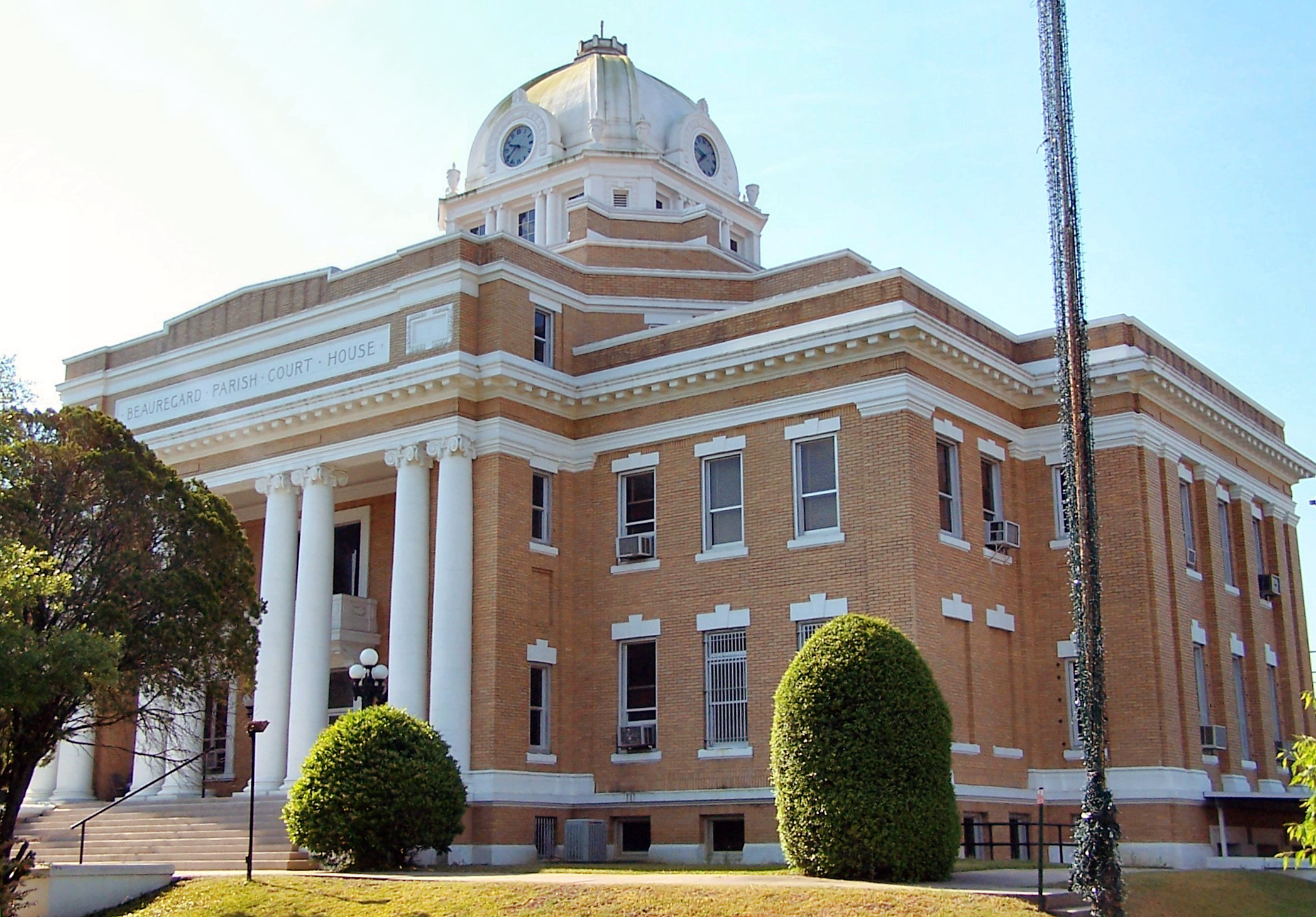
- Beauregard Parish Courthouse
- Motto: "We dwell in possibilities"
- Location of DeRidder in Beauregard Parish (south) and Vernon Parish (north), Louisiana.

- Location of Louisiana in the United States
- Coordinates: 30°51′50″N 93°17′32″W
- Country: United States
- State: Louisiana
- Parishes: Beauregard, Vernon
- Incorporated: 1903 (123 years ago)

Area
  - Total: 9.38 sq mi (24.29 km^{2})
  - Land: 9.29 sq mi (24.06 km^{2})
  - Water: 0.089 sq mi (0.23 km^{2})
- Elevation: 197 ft (60 m)

Population (2020)
  - Total: 9,852
  - Density: 1,060.4/sq mi (409.44/km^{2})
- Time zone: UTC-6 (CST)
  - Summer (DST): UTC-5 (CDT)
- ZIP code: 70634
- Area code: 337
- FIPS code: 22-20610
- GNIS feature ID: 2404220
- Website: www.cityofderidder.org

DeRidder is a city in and the parish seat of Beauregard Parish, Louisiana, United States. A small portion of the city extends into Vernon Parish. As of the 2020 census, DeRidder had a population of 9,852. It is the smaller principal city of the DeRidder-Fort Polk South CSA, a Combined Statistical Area that includes the Fort Polk South (Vernon Parish) and DeRidder (Beauregard Parish) micropolitan areas, which had a combined population of 87,988 at the 2010 census.

== History ==
DeRidder was named for Ella de Ridder, the sister-in-law of a Dutch railroad financier, Jan de Goeijen (cf. De Queen, Arkansas). Her family originally came from the small town of Geldermalsen in the Netherlands, where she was one of 13 children. She ran away from home at an early age and was presumed dead by her family, who only later discovered that she had traveled to the United States. The town was named for her by her brother-in-law, who brought the first railroad to that area of Louisiana. Prior to that, the little town was known as Schovall. The first train line to serve DeRidder came in 1897. It was the Kansas City, Pittsburgh & Gulf Railroad, later called the Kansas City Southern and now Canadian Pacific Kansas City (CPKC).

The July 26, 1924, the DeRidder Enterprise stated: "The first house in DeRidder was made of logs and covered with board shingles, split by hand from the logs of the forest. It was constructed in 1893 and was the old homestead house of Calvin Shirley, who was the original owner of the land upon which the first business house and residence of DeRidder were built. Mr. Shirley homesteaded the 160 acres (0.65 km^{2}) which was later platted and became the original townsite of DeRidder."

According to Eva Stewart Frazar, whose family came to DeRidder near the turn of the century, "The largest pine in the world grew where DeRidder now stands - or so it is claimed by timber men who knew."

About the origin of the town, she says:

[T]he Kansas City railroad was built from Kansas City to Port Arthur - and came right through here about 1896. By 1898 the trains were running. The post-office was named Miersburg for the postmaster whose name was Miers. The railroad workers had used this spot for a camping place for the workmen - and people wanted to get near the railroad - so 160 acres (0.65 km^{2}) of land was bought for the town site. Immediately following the purchase of the town site, a ramble of rough houses were hurriedly built out of rough lumber... By 1898 the town consisted of nearly 300 people and a number of shack homes and a sawmill. C. Landry and Mr. George Heard had a hotel. There were about 5 small stores, besides. West Brothers had a Rous Racket store on the east side of the track.

By this time DeRidder had a sawmill, and timber was the prime industry of the area. The longleaf pine was the primary tree used in the industry. In 1903, DeRidder was finally incorporated as a town.

In April 1904, a large portion of the business section of DeRidder was destroyed by fire. The cause was apparently arson. A grand jury collected enough evidence for this to indict George Smith, a gambler, with setting the fire. The man reportedly left town.

DeRidder's first bank opened in 1906. On October 15, 1912, DeRidder was voted the parish seat of Beauregard Parish. The Beauregard Parish Court House and the Beauregard Parish Jail were built in 1914.

Misty Roberts, an independent, was elected as the first female mayor of DeRidder in 2018. In July 2024, during her second term, she resigned while being investigated for rape of a juvenile. She appointed the fire chief as acting mayor, and was later arrested. Michael D. Harris was subsequently elected as the first Black mayor of DeRidder. In March 2026, Roberts was found guilty of carnal knowledge of a juvenile and indecent behavior with a juvenile, both felonies.

== Geography ==
DeRidder is located in northern Beauregard Parish. U.S. Route 171 leads south 48 miles (77 km) to Lake Charles and north 15 miles (24 km) to the entrance to Fort Polk and 21 miles (34 km) to Leesville. U.S. Route 190 leads south and east 49 miles (79 km) to Kinder and west 52 miles (84 km) to Jasper, Texas.

According to the United States Census Bureau, DeRidder has a total area of 9.2 square miles (23.9 km^{2}), of which 9.2 square miles (23.7 km^{2}) is land and 0.077 square miles (0.2 km^{2}), or 0.96%, is water.

=== Split Parish ===
The northern section of the Green Acres subdivision, west of highway 171 on the extreme northwest side of DeRidder, extends into Vernon Parish. Another section of the city, running north along the east side highway 171, up to a parallel with Golden Lantern road, also extends into Vernon Parish. Water and sewage for Green Acres and Country Estates Subdivisions is provided by the independent Green Acres Water & Sewer District #1

=== Climate ===
DeRidder has a humid subtropical climate (Köppen: Cfa) with long, hot summers and short, mild winters.

Climate data for DeRidder, Louisiana (1991–2020 normals, extremes 1920–2016)
Month	Jan	Feb	Mar	Apr	May	Jun	Jul	Aug	Sep	Oct	Nov	Dec	Year
Record high °F (°C)	89 (32)	88 (31)	92 (33)	93 (34)	97 (36)	106 (41)	105 (41)	106 (41)	109 (43)	97 (36)	90 (32)	85 (29)	109 (43)
Mean maximum °F (°C)	76.2 (24.6)	78.8 (26.0)	84.0 (28.9)	87.0 (30.6)	91.5 (33.1)	95.8 (35.4)	97.1 (36.2)	98.9 (37.2)	95.7 (35.4)	90.3 (32.4)	83.6 (28.7)	78.1 (25.6)	99.3 (37.4)
Mean daily maximum °F (°C)	60.9 (16.1)	64.7 (18.2)	72.1 (22.3)	78.2 (25.7)	84.7 (29.3)	90.5 (32.5)	91.7 (33.2)	92.5 (33.6)	88.7 (31.5)	79.9 (26.6)	70.1 (21.2)	62.3 (16.8)	78.0 (25.6)
Daily mean °F (°C)	49.8 (9.9)	53.6 (12.0)	60.6 (15.9)	66.7 (19.3)	74.3 (23.5)	80.4 (26.9)	82.1 (27.8)	82.4 (28.0)	78.0 (25.6)	68.3 (20.2)	58.4 (14.7)	51.4 (10.8)	67.2 (19.6)
Mean daily minimum °F (°C)	38.7 (3.7)	42.5 (5.8)	49.0 (9.4)	55.3 (12.9)	63.9 (17.7)	70.3 (21.3)	72.6 (22.6)	72.3 (22.4)	67.3 (19.6)	56.8 (13.8)	46.6 (8.1)	40.4 (4.7)	56.3 (13.5)
Mean minimum °F (°C)	24.3 (−4.3)	28.2 (−2.1)	32.2 (0.1)	40.0 (4.4)	51.3 (10.7)	63.0 (17.2)	68.4 (20.2)	66.8 (19.3)	54.7 (12.6)	41.0 (5.0)	31.3 (−0.4)	26.6 (−3.0)	23.0 (−5.0)
Record low °F (°C)	9 (−13)	0 (−18)	20 (−7)	39 (4)	42 (6)	50 (10)	56 (13)	54 (12)	40 (4)	28 (−2)	20 (−7)	7 (−14)	0 (−18)
Average precipitation inches (mm)	6.36 (162)	4.63 (118)	4.89 (124)	5.19 (132)	5.06 (129)	5.81 (148)	4.91 (125)	5.01 (127)	5.36 (136)	5.03 (128)	5.49 (139)	6.35 (161)	64.09 (1,628)
Average precipitation days (≥ 0.01 in)	8.9	7.2	7.8	6.8	6.5	8.5	8.6	7.5	6.2	5.6	6.9	8.4	88.9
Source: NOAA

== Demographics ==
Historical population
Census	Pop.	Note	%±
1910	2,100		—
1920	3,535		68.3%
1930	3,747		6.0%
1940	3,750		0.1%
1950	5,799		54.6%
1960	7,188		24.0%
1970	8,030		11.7%
1980	10,337		28.7%
1990	9,868		−4.5%
2000	9,808		−0.6%
2010	10,578		7.9%
2020	9,852		−6.9%
2025 (est.)	9,503	▼	−3.5%
U.S. Decennial Census

=== Racial and ethnic composition ===
DeRidder city, Louisiana – Racial and ethnic composition Note: the US Census treats Hispanic/Latino as an ethnic category. This table excludes Latinos from the racial categories and assigns them to a separate category. Hispanics/Latinos may be of any race.
Race / Ethnicity (NH = Non-Hispanic)	Pop 2000	Pop 2010	Pop 2020	% 2000	% 2010	% 2020
White alone (NH)	5,861	6,033	5,409	59.76%	57.03%	54.90%
Black or African American alone (NH)	3,381	3,487	3,080	34.47%	32.96%	31.26%
Native American or Alaska Native alone (NH)	51	88	62	0.52%	0.83%	0.63%
Asian alone (NH)	130	156	155	1.33%	1.47%	1.57%
Native Hawaiian or Pacific Islander alone (NH)	2	14	16	0.02%	0.13%	0.16%
Other race alone (NH)	4	34	26	0.04%	0.32%	0.26%
Mixed race or Multiracial (NH)	144	292	528	1.47%	2.76%	5.36%
Hispanic or Latino (any race)	235	474	576	2.40%	4.48%	5.85%
Total	9,808	10,578	9,852	100.00%	100.00%	100.00%

=== 2020 census ===
As of the 2020 United States census, there were 9,852 people, 3,838 households, and 2,510 families residing in the city.

=== 2000 census ===
As of the census of 2000, there were 9,808 people, 3,819 households, and 2,616 families residing in the city. The population density was 1,155.4 inhabitants per square mile (446.1/km^{2}). There were 4,454 housing units at an average density of 524.7 units per square mile (202.6 units/km^{2}). The racial makeup of the city was 60.81% White, 34.73% African American, 0.57% Native American, 1.42% Asian, 0.03% Pacific Islander, 0.57% from other races, and 1.88% from two or more races. Hispanic or Latino of any race were 2.40% of the population.

There were 3,819 households, out of which 33.3% had children under the age of 18 living with them, 48.6% were married couples living together, 16.9% had a female householder with no husband present, and 31.5% were non-families. 28.1% of all households were made up of individuals, and 11.7% had someone living alone who was 65 years of age or older. The average household size was 2.48 and the average family size was 3.03.

In the city of DeRidder, the population was spread out, with 27.1% under the age of 18, 8.6% from 18 to 24, 27.3% from 25 to 44, 22.4% from 45 to 64, and 14.5% who were 65 years of age or older. The median age was 37 years. For every 100 females, there were 89.2 males. For every 100 females age 18 and over, there were 83.3 males.

The median income for a household in the city was $31,952, and the median income for a family was $39,384. Males had a median income of $36,388 versus $21,302 for females. The per capita income for the city was $16,996. About 15.0% of families and 18.0% of the population were below the poverty line, including 22.1% of those under age 18 and 18.2% of those age 65 or over.

== Arts and culture ==
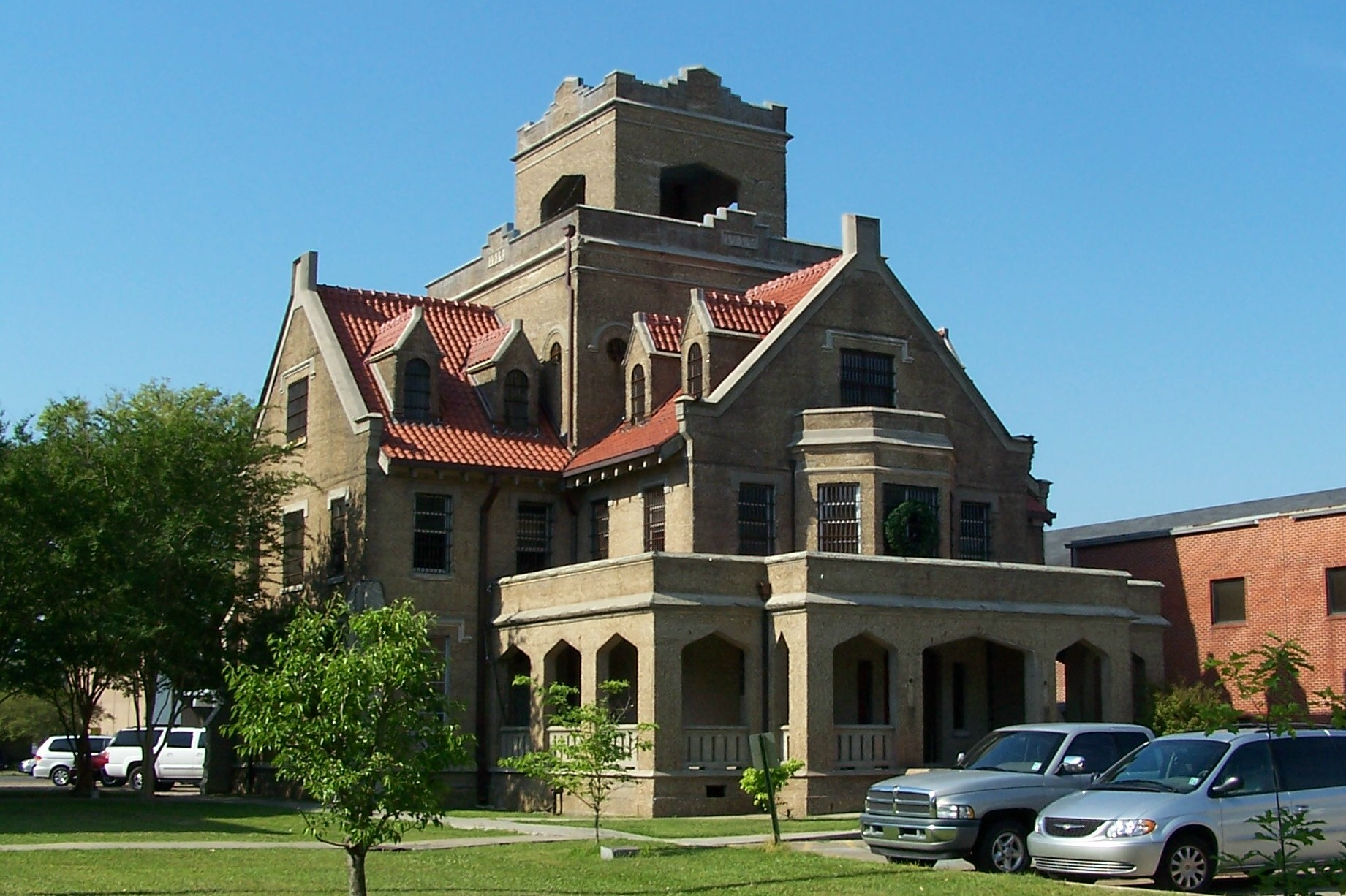
The former Beauregard Parish Jail: The "Hanging Jail"

The building known as the "Old Beauregard Parish Jail" is a structure built in 1914 that is considered one of the most distinctive of its type in the US. The structure has the characteristics of the collegiate Gothic Revival architectural style, with shallow arches, dormer windows, and a central tower. This style was popular with colleges, universities, and churches. The iron bars in most of the windows give the structure an eerie appearance. Inside, there is a spiral staircase that leads up to three floors of jail cells. Another history-making fact is that each cell had a toilet, shower, lavatory and window. When the jail was in use, prisoners could often be seen waving from the barred windows.

It was built to house 50 or so prisoners, but held 13 in comfort. The walls are 13 to 21 in (0.33 to 0.53 m) thick, made of reinforced concrete with a blasted finish. The first floor has quarters for the jailer and his family. In the jail's basement, a long corridor leads to the courthouse next door.

In 1928, there was a famous double execution by hanging in the jail for two murderers. These were the only recorded hangings in the jail. The prisoners were hanged by an apparatus at the top of the spiral staircase. After this the jail became known as "the hanging jail".

The jail was used until 1982, when a court action forced it to close. On October 4, 1981, it was put on the National Register of Historic Places, along with several other buildings in DeRidder.

=== Historic district ===
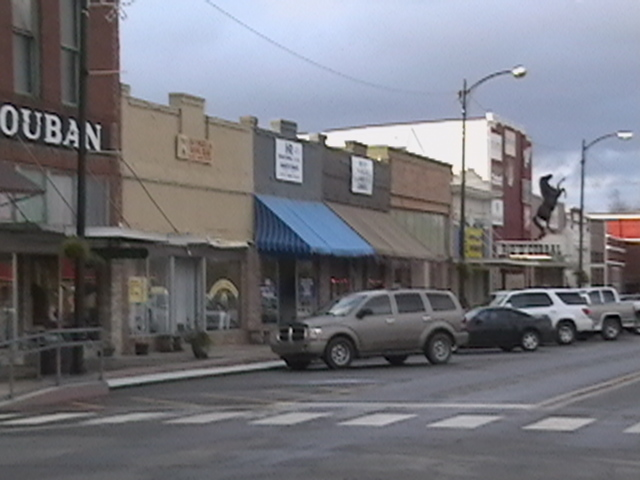
DeRidder Historic District and buildings

In 1983 Washington, Second, Stewart, and Port streets were added to the National Register of Historic Places listings in Beauregard Parish as the DeRidder Commercial Historic District.

== Education ==
Beauregard Parish School Board operates local public schools.

For the city of DeRidder these schools are:

- Grades 9–12 DeRidder High School (DeRidder)
- Grades 6–8 DeRidder Junior High School (DeRidder)
- Grades 4 & 5 Pine Wood Elementary School (DeRidder)
- Grades 2 & 3 G. W. Carver Elementary School (DeRidder)
- PreK - 1st Grade K. R. Hanchey Elementary School (DeRidder)

== Media ==
The Beauregard Daily News, a daily newspaper, is based in DeRidder.

== Infrastructure ==
- Beauregard Regional Airport

== Notable people ==
- Bert A. Adams, state representative from Vernon Parish from 1956 to 1968; born in DeRidder in 1916
- Joe W. Aguillard, president of Louisiana College in Pineville 2005 - 2014
- Mel Branch, college/professional football player – LSU/Dallas Texans/Kansas City Chiefs/Miami Dolphins
- Chris Cagle, collegiate and professional football player in College Football Hall of Fame
- Chris Cagle, country music singer
- Jerry DeWitt, former Pentecostal minister and current leader of the American atheism movement
- Deshazor Everett, college/professional football player – Texas A&M/Washington Redskins
- Rusty Hamer, former child actor who committed suicide in DeRidder in 1990
- Gilbert Franklin Hennigan, former Louisiana state senator
- Johnny Jones, college basketball head coach at University of North Texas and LSU
- Michael Mayes, former NFL player
- Michael Sanders, college/NBA basketball player – UCLA/Kansas City Kings/Cleveland Cavaliers
- Elijah Stewart (born 1995), basketball player for the Israeli Basketball Premier League
- Tim Temple, Louisiana Insurance Commissioner
- Charles Emery Tooke, Jr., state senator for DeSoto and Caddo parishes, 1948 to 1956
- Jennifer Weiner, author
