= List of former high schools in Louisiana =

This is a list of former high schools in Louisiana.

== Former Louisiana high schools ==
=== A ===
- Acadia Baptist Academy, Eunice
- Acadiana Preparatory School, Opelousas
- Adam Carlson High School, St. Martinville
- Alcee Fortier High School, New Orleans
- Alfred Lawless High School, New Orleans
- Alfred Wettermark High School. Boyce
- Alma Brown High School, Oberlin
- Algiers Technology Academy, New Orleans
- Allen High School, Oakdale
- Alto High School, Alto
- American Academy, Bogalusa
- Amy Bradford Ware High School, Opelousas
- Andrew Jackson High School, Chalmette
- Archbishop Blenk High School, Gretna
- Armstrong High School, Rayne
- Arnaudville High School, Arnaudville
- Ashland High School, Ashland
- Athens High School, Athens
- Atlanta High School, Atlanta
- Audrey Memorial High School, Creole

=== B ===
- Baptist Christian Academy, Shreveport
- Baskin High School, Baskin
- Batchelor High School, Batchelor
- Bayou Chicot High School, Bayou Chicot
- Baywood High School, Baywood
- Belmont Academy, Opelousas
- Bernice High School, Bernice
- Bethel Christian School, Jennings
- Bethune High School, Welsh
- Bienville Academy, Bryceland
- Bienville High School, Bienville
- Bishop McManus Academy, New Orleans
- Boothville-Venice High School, Boothville
- Bryceland High School, Bryceland
- Buras High School, Buras
- Burgher High School, Independence

=== C ===
- Calhoun High School, Calhoun
- Campti High School, Campti
- Carrie Martin High School, Plain Dealing, a school for African Americans, it was named for an administrator who helped establish schools for blacks
- Carter C. Raymond High School, Lecompte, a school for African Americans, Raymond was principal
- Carter G. Woodson High School, Haynesville, a Carter G. Woodson was a historian who led efforts to study African American history
- Carter G. Woodson High School, Lawtell
- Cathedral-Carmel School, Lafayette
- Cenla Christian Academy, Alexandria
- Central School, Grand Cane
- Central High School, Dubberly
- Central High School, Natchitoches
- Central High School, Shreveport
- Central Memorial High School, Bogalusa
- C.H. Irion High School, Benton
- Chaneyville High School, Chaneyville
- Charlotte A. Mitchell High School, Bossier City
- Chataignier High School, Chataignier
- Chatham High School, Chatham
- Cheneyville High School, Cheneyville
- Christian Life Academy, Baton Rouge
- Clarks High School, Clarks
- Clifton L. Ganus High School, New Orleans
- Clinton High School, Clinton
- C.M. Washington High School, Thibodaux
- Cohn High School, Port Allen
- Coleman High School, Gibsland
- Colfax High School, Colfax
- Columbia High School, Columbia
- Combs-McIntyre High School, Oak Grove
- Concordia High School, Vidalia
- Cor Jesu High School, New Orleans
- Cotton Valley High School, Cotton Valley
- Cottonport High School, Cottonport
- Coushatta High School, Coushatta
- Crawford High School, Arcadia
- Crescent Leadership Academy, New Orleans
- Crowville High School, Crowville
- Cypress Grove High School, Lutcher

=== D ===
- Delta High School, Delta
- Desire Street Academy, New Orleans
- Dry Creek High School, Dry Creek
- Dry Prong High School, Dry Prong
- Dubach High School, Dubach
- Dubberly High School, Dubberly

=== E ===
- East High School, Clinton
- East Ascension Academy, Gonzales
- East Union Academy, Marion
- Eastside High School, Farmerville
- Eden Gardens High School, Shreveport
- Epps High School, Epps
- Eros High School, Eros
- Esther Toombs High School, Delhi, originally Richland Parish Training School it was renamed for a cherished teacher
- Eula D. Britton High School, Rayville, a school for African Americans, Britton was its principal
- Evergreen High School, Evergreen

=== F ===
- Fair Park High School, Shreveport
- Farmerville High School, Farmerville
- Fellowship School, rural Claiborne Parish
- Fellowship School, Lillie
- Fenton High School, Fenton
- Fifth Ward High School, Reserve
- First Baptist Academy, Shreveport
- Forest Hill Academy, Forest Hill
- Forest Hill High School, Forest Hill
- Fort Necessity High School, Fort Necessity
- Francis M. Boley High School, Jeanerette, school for African Americans
- Francis T. Nicholls High School, New Orleans, Francis T. Nichols served as governor of Louisiana
- Friendship Academy, Shreveport

=== G ===
- G.W. Carver High School, Bunkie, George Washington Carver was an educator and community leader
- G.W. Carver High School, Hahnville
- G.W. Carver High School, Kinder
- G.W. Griffin High School, Lake Providence
- Gables High School, Metairie
- Gaudet High School, New Orleans
- Gibsland High School, Gibsland
- Gilbert Academy, New Orleans
- Gonzales High School, Gonzales
- Grace King High School, Metairie
- Grand Avenue High School, DeQuincy
- Grand Cane High School, Grand Cane
- Grambling High School, Grambling
- Grambling Laboratory School, Grambling
- Grawood Christian School, Keithville
- Greater Gentilly High School, New Orleans
- Greensburg High School, Greensburg
- Greenville Park High School, Hammond

=== H ===
- Hall Summit High School, Hall Summit
- Helen Cox High School, Harvey
- Herndon High School, Belcher
- H.C. Ross High School, Crowley
- Helena High School, Greensburg
- Hico School, Hico
- Hillcrest High School, Athens
- Hodge High School, Hodge
- Holy Name High School, New Orleans
- Holy Rosary Institute, Lafayette
- Holy Savior Central High School, Alexandria
- Hopewell High School, Dubach
- Huntington School, Ferriday
- Hyatt High School, Fields

=== I ===
- Iberville High School, Plaquemine
- Immaculata High School, Marrero
- Immaculate Conception Catholic School, Lebeau
- Innis High School, Innis

=== J ===
- Jackson High School, Jackson
- Jackson High School, Jonesboro
- James Stephens High School, Ville Platte
- Jasper Henderson High School, Chatham, originally Chatham Colored School
- Jefferson Davis High School, Jennings
- J.M. Davidson High School, St. Joseph
- John McDonogh High School, New Orleans
- John W. Gaines High School, Montgomery
- John H. Martyn High School, Kenner
- Jonas Henderson High School, New Iberia
- Jonesboro High School, Jonesboro
- Jonesville Consolidated High School, Jonesville
- Joseph Celestine High School, Mamou
- J.S. Clark High School, New Orleans
- J.S. Clark High School, Zwolle
- J.S. Slocum High School, Pineville

=== K ===
- Katie B. Thomas High School, Elton
- Kelly School, Kelly
- Kennedy High School, Gonzales
- Kenner High School, Kenner
- Kent Hadley High School, Raceland
- Kilbourne High School, Kilbourne
- KIPP Renaissance High School, New Orleans
- Kisatchie High School, Kisatchie

=== L ===
- La Harpe Street Academy, New Orleans
- Lafargue High School, Effie
- Lake Area New Tech Early College High School, New Orleans
- Lake Charles High School, Lake Charles
- Lake Charles-Boston High School, Lake Charles
- Lake Providence High School, Lake Providence
- Landry Memorial High School, Lake Charles
- Lanes Chapel High School, Downsville
- Lanier High School, Shreveport
- Larose High School, Larose
- Larose-Cut Off High School, Larose
- Lawtell High School, Lawtell
- L. E. Rabouin Career Magnet School, New Orleans
- L. E. Rabouin Memorial Trades School, New Orleans
- L. E. Rabouin Vocational High School, New Orleans
- Lecompte High School, Lecompte
- Leonville High School, Leonville
- Lillie High School, Lillie
- Lincoln High School, Marrero
- Lincoln High School, Ruston
- Lincoln-Morrow High School, Morrow
- Lincoln Road High School, Alexandria
- Linear High School, Shreveport
- Linville High School, Marion
- Lisbon High School, Lisbon
- Little Flower High School, Monroe
- Lockport High School, Lockport
- Longville High School, Longville
- Lowery High School, Donaldsonville
- Lucy School, near Edgard
- Lutherville School, Mansura
- Lynn Oaks School, Braithwaite
- Lyon High School, Covington

=== M ===
- Magnolia High School, Vacherie
- Mamou-Rosenwald High School, Mamou
- Mansfield Academy, Donaldsonville
- Mansfield Baptist Academy, Mansfield
- Mansura High School, Mansura
- Marion High School, Marion
- Marion High School, Lake Charles
- Marion Abramson High School, New Orleans
- Marrero High School, Marrero
- Marthaville High School, Marthaville
- Martin High School, Sicily Island
- Martin Behrman High School, New Orleans
- Mary Bethune High School, Welsh
- Mary M. Bethune High School, Norco
- Mary M. Bethune High School, Shreveport
- Mary Graham High School, Colfax
- Maurice High School, Maurice
- Mayfield High School, Homer
- McKowen High School, Jackson
- Meaux High School, Meaux
- Melville High School, Melville
- Menard Memorial High School, Alexandria
- Metairie High School, Metairie
- Mid-City Baptist High School, New Orleans
- Miller-McCoy Academy, New Orleans
- Mineral Springs High School, rural Lincoln Parish
- Mineral Springs High School, Calhoun
- Minden Academy, Minden
- Mission School, Napoleonville
- Monroe High School, Monroe
- Monroe Christian School, Monroe
- Mooringsport High School, Mooringsport
- Morehouse High School, Bastrop
- Moreauville High School, Moreauville
- Morgan City Academy, Morgan City
- Morganza High School, Morganza
- Morrow High School, Morrow
- Mossville High School, Mossville
- Mount Carmel Catholic School, New Iberia
- Mount Carmel Catholic School, Opelousas
- Mount Mariah High School, Chatham
- Mount Olive Christian School, Athens
- Mount Olive High School, Blanchard
- Mount Pisgah High School, rural Claiborne Parish
- Mount Pleasant High School, Forbing
- Myles High School, Sterlington

=== N ===
- Napoleonville High School, Napoleonville
- Natchez High School, Cloutierville
- Natchitoches Academy, Natchitoches
- Natchitoches High School, Natchitoches
- New Hope Christian Academy, Kinder
- New Orleans Academy, New Orleans
- New Roads High School, New Roads
- Newellton High School, Newellton
- Noble High School, Noble
- North Eunice High School, Eunice
- Northwestern High School, Zachary

=== O ===
- Oak Hill High School, Shreveport
- Oak Grove High School, Oak Grove (Sabine Parish)
- Oak Ridge High School, Oak Ridge
- Ogden High School, Liddieville
- Oil City High School, Oil City
- Olla High School, Olla
- O.P. Walker High School, New Orleans
- Opelousas Academy, Opelousas
- Our Lady of Fatima Catholic School, Lafayette
- Our Lady of Help Catholic School, Bastrop
- O.W. Dillon High School, Kentwood

=== P ===
- P. L. Dunbar High School, Simmesport, named for Paul Laurence Dunbar
- P. L. Dunbar High School, Washington
- Palestine School, Gibsland
- Park Avenue High School, Franklin
- Paul Breaux High School, Lafayette, served African American students
- Pecan Island High School, Pecan Island
- Pelican All Saints High School, Pelican
- Perrin High School, Ponchatoula
- P.G.T. Beauregard High School, Chalmette
- Phyllis Wheatley High School, Melville
- Pierre Capdau Early College High School, New Orleans
- Pineview High School, Covington
- Pineview High School, Lisbon
- Pine Crest High School, Winnfield
- Pine Flats High School, Many
- Pine Grove High School, Pine Grove
- Pine Valley High School, Vivian
- Pioneer School, Pioneer
- Plain Dealing Academy, Plain Dealing
- Plaisance High School, Plaisance
- Pointe Coupee Central High School, Morganza
- Poland High School, Poland
- Pollock High School, Pollock
- Port Sulphur High School, Port Sulphur
- Poydras High School, New Roads
- Prairieville High School, Duplessis
- Pride High School, Pride
- Princeton High School, Shreveport
- Promised Land Academy, Braithwaite
- Prytania Private School, New Orleans

=== R ===
- Raceland High School, Raceland
- Ragley High School, Ragley
- Rayville-Rosenwald High School, Rayville
- Redeemer High School, New Orleans
- Redeemer-Seton High School, New Orleans
- Redemptorist High School, Baton Rouge
- Redemptorist Boys and Girls High School, New Orleans
- Redmon Spikes High School, Elm Grove
- Reidheimer-Creston High School, Natchitoches
- Reserve High School, Reserve
- Reserve Christian School, Reserve
- Reuben McCall High School, Tallulah
- Rhymes-Rosenwald High School, Rayville
- Richardson High School, Monroe
- Ridgedale Academy, West Monroe
- Ridgewood Preparatory School, Metairie
- Roanoke High School, Roanoke
- Robeline School, Robeline
- Robert E. Lee High School, Baton Rouge; (see Liberty Magnet High School).
- Roberts Academy, Cheneyville
- Rochelle School, Rochelle
- Rodessa School, Rodessa
- Rosedale High School (Rosedale, Louisiana), Rosedale
- Rosenwald High School (New Roads, Louisiana), New Roads
- Rosenwald High School (Rosenwald, Louisiana), Rosenwald
- Rosenwald-Covington High School, Covington
- Rosenwald-Logansport High School, Logansport
- Ross High School, Minden
- Rougon High School, Rougon
- Runnels High School, Baton Rouge
- Ruston Academy, Ruston

=== S ===
- St. Aloysius Catholic High School, New Orleans
- St. Augustine High School, New Roads
- St. Bernard High School, St. Bernard
- St. Catherine's High School, New Orleans
- St. Charles Borromeo High School, Destrehan
- St. Dominic's High School, New Orleans
- St. Francis Catholic School, Iota
- St. Francis de Sales High School, Houma
- St. Francisville High School, St. Francisville
- St. Gabriel High School, St. Gabriel
- St. Helena High School, Greensburg
- St. James High School, Alexandria
- St. James High School, Convent
- St. John at Lamourie High School, Evangeline
- St. John High School, rural Claiborne Parish
- St. John's Catholic High School, Shreveport
- St. Joseph High School, St. Joseph
- St. Joseph's Catholic School, Rayne
- St. Landry High School, Opelousas
- St. Louis Catholic High School, Welcome
- St. Lucy Catholic School, Houma
- St. Maria Goretti Catholic School, Lake Arthur
- St. Martin Academy, St. Martinville
- St. Matthew's High School, Melrose
- St. Michael Catholic School, Crowley
- St. Peter Claver High School, Grand Coteau
- St. Tammany High School, Slidell
- Sabine High School, Many
- Sam Barthe School for Boys, Metairie
- Sam Crowe High School, Oak Grove
- Sarepta High School, Sarepta
- Scott High School, Scott
- Scottville High School, rural Plaquemines Parish
- Second Ward High School, Edgard
- Second Ward High School, Gloster
- Servier High School, Ferriday
- Servier-Rosenwald High School, Ferriday
- Seton Academy, New Orleans
- Seventh District Academy, Crowley
- Shady Grove School, Saline
- Shady Grove High School, Rosedale
- Shongaloo High School, Shongaloo
- Shreve Christian School, Shreveport
- Shreveport High School, Shreveport
- Sibley High School, Sibley
- Simmesport High School, Simmesport
- S.J. Peters High School, New Orleans
- Sojourner Truth Academy, New Orleans
- South Alexandria High School, Alexandria
- South Rapides Academy, LeCompte
- Southland Academy, Dubach
- Southdown High School, Houma
- Southfield School, Shreveport
- Southside High School, Ringgold
- Southwest Rapides High School, Glenmora
- Southwood Academy, Hammond
- Spearsville High School, Spearsville
- Springhill High School, near Natchitoches
- Springhill High School, Springhill
- Springville High School, Coushatta
- Spring Ridge High School, Keithville
- Start High School, Start
- Sumpter Williams High School, Morgan City
- Sunrise High School, Empire
- Sunset High School, Sunset
- Sunshine High School, Sunshine
- Swayze High School, Richwood

=== T ===
- Tallulah High School, Tallulah
- Tensas-Rosenwald High School, St. Joseph
- Tenth District Academy, Monroe
- Terzia High School, Monroe
- The Church Academy, Baton Rouge
- The Hopewell School, Dubach
- Thomastown High School, Thomastown
- Thomas A. Levy High School, Rosedale
- Thurgood Marshall Early College High School, New Orleans
- Tim Tippitt High School, West Monroe
- Trinity Heights Christian Academy, Shreveport
- Trout High School, Trout
- Trout-Goodpine High School, Trout
- Tullos High School, Tullos

=== U ===
- Union Baptist School, Monroe
- Union High School, Farmerville
- Union High School, Mer Rouge
- Union High School, rural Morehouse Parish
- Union High School, Shreveport
- Union Central High School, Columbia
- University Academy of Central Louisiana, Alexandria
- Upper Pointe Coupee High School, Batchelor
- Urania High School, Urania

=== V ===
- Valencia High School, Shreveport
- Valley Forge Academy, Amite
- Vernon School, Mount Hermon
- Vernon High School, Leesville
- Vidrine High School, Vidrine
- Violet Consolidated High School, Violet
- Vivian High School, Vivian

=== W ===
- W. H. Reed High School, Napoleonville
- Walnut Hill High School, Shreveport
- Ward III High School, Winnsboro
- Washington High School, Lake Charles
- Washington High School, Washington
- Washington Heights High School, Ruston
- Washington Parish High School, Franklinton
- Waterproof High School, Waterproof
- Waverly High School, Winnsboro
- Webster High School, Minden
- Wesley Ray High School, Angie
- West High School, Jackson
- West Livingston High School, Denham Springs
- Westhill Academy, Marthaville
- West Side High School, Amite
- Westside High School, Bernice
- Westwego High School, Westwego
- Wicker High School, New Orleans
- William H. Reed High School, Napoleonville
- Willow Street High School, Franklin
- Winn Academy, Winnfield
- Winnsboro High School, Winnsboro
- Wisner High School, Wisner
- Wisner-Gilbert High School, Wisner
- W. O. Boston High School, Lake Charles
- Woodson High School, Haynesville
- W.W. Stewart High School, Basile

=== X ===
- Xavier University Preparatory School, New Orleans

=== Y ===
- Youngsville High School, Youngsville

== See also ==
- List of high schools in Louisiana
- List of school districts in Louisiana
- List of former high schools in New Orleans
