= List of former high schools in New Orleans =

This is a list of former public and private high schools in New Orleans.

Holy angels

== Former New Orleans high schools ==
- Abramson Science and Technology Charter School
- Alcee Fortier High School
- Alfred Lawless High School
- Algiers Technology Academy
- Bishop McManus Academy
- Boys High School
- Clifton L. Ganus High School
- Commercial High School
- Consolidated Boys High School
- Cor Jesu High School
- Crescent Leadership Academy
- Desire Street Academy
- Francis T. Nicholls High School
- G. W. Carver Collegiate Academy
- G. W. Carver Preparatory Academy
- George Washington Carver Senior High School
- Greater Gentilly High School
- KIPP Booker T. Washington High School
- KIPP Renaissance High School
- Joseph S. Clark Senior High School
- Joseph S. Clark Preparatory High School
- Lake Area New Tech Early College High School
- L.B. Landry High School
- L. E. Rabouin Career Magnet School
- L. E. Rabouin Vocational High School
- L. E. Rabouin Memorial Trades School
- Marion Abramson High School
- Martin Behrman High School
- McDonogh 35 Senior High School
- Mid-City Baptist School
- Miller-McCoy Academy
- New Orleans Academy
- New Orleans Center for Health Careers High School
- New Orleans Public Schools Alternative High School
- New Orleans High School Signature Centers
- O. Perry Walker High School
- Pierre Capdau Early College High School
- Prytania Private School
- Redeemer High School
- Redeemer-Seton High School
- Redemptorist Boys and Girls High School
- St. Aloysius Catholic High School
- St. Joseph Academy
- S. J. Peters High School
- Schwarz Alternative School
- Seton Academy
- Sojourner Truth Academy
- Thurgood Marshall Early College High School
- Walter L. Cohen High School
- Xavier University Preparatory School

== See also ==
- List of high schools in Louisiana
- List of former high schools in Louisiana
- List of school districts in Louisiana
