= Pointe Coupee Parish School Board =

School district in Louisiana, United States

Pointe Coupee Parish School District

Address
- 337 Napoleon St New Roads, Pointe Coupee, Louisiana, 70760; United States
- Coordinates: 30.6970°N 91.4397°W

District information
- Grades: K-12
- Established: 1895
- Superintendent: Kim Canezaro
- Asst. superintendent(s): Karla Wesley-Jack

Other information
- Website: Pointe Coupee Parish School Board

Pointe Coupee Parish School Board is the public school district that administers public education in Pointe Coupee Parish, Louisiana, United States. The district is headquartered in the city of New Roads, the parish seat, and provides educational services to students residing throughout Pointe Coupee Parish.

The district operates one 7–12 secondary school, Livonia High School, located in the town of Livonia. It also operates the STEM Magnet Academy of Pointe Coupee, a campus of Livonia High School, in Morganza, Louisiana, which offers a curriculum focused on science, technology, engineering, and mathematics for students in grades 3–12. Students and faculty at the STEM Magnet Academy participate in the Louisiana Training Platform, a statewide Louisiana State University (LSU) initiative that expands access to biomedical and data‑driven STEM education for high school and college learners.

For elementary and middle grades, the school district operates Rougon Elementary and Junior High, serving students from kindergarten through eighth grade, Rosenwald Elementary, Upper Pointe Coupee Elementary, and Valverda Elementary schools, serving students from kindergarten through sixth grade.

Together, these campuses constitute the parish‑wide system of public schools governed by the Pointe Coupee Parish School Board.

== Schools and Campuses ==
=== K-6 schools ===
- Valverda Elementary School (Rougon, Louisiana)
- Rosenwald Elementary School (New Roads, Louisiana)

=== K-8 schools ===
Rougon Elementary School

- Rougon Elementary and Junior High School (Rougon, Louisiana)
- Upper Pointe Coupee Elementary School (Batchelor, Louisiana)

=== 3-12 schools ===
- STEM Magnet Academy of Pointe Coupee (Morganza, Louisiana)

=== 7-12 schools ===
- Livonia High School (Livonia, Louisiana)

== Former schools ==
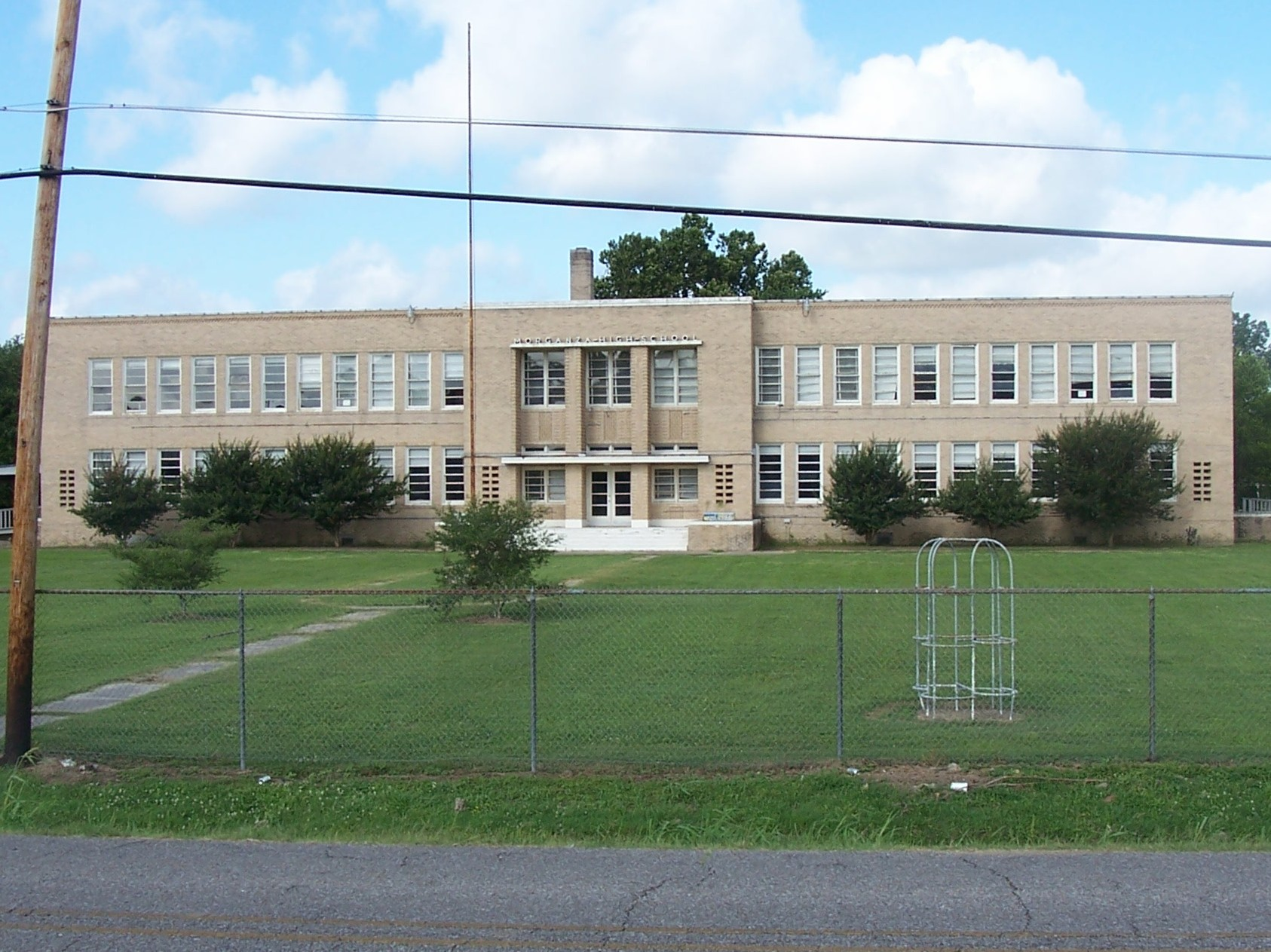
Morganza High School, later Morganza Elementary School

=== High schools ===
Transferred to other ownership

- Pointe Coupee Central High School (became a charter school in 2008)

Closed

- Innis High School
- Morganza High School
- Poydras High School
- Rosenwald High School (at a previous point New Roads High School) - Merged into Pointe Coupee Central High School in 1991
- Rougon High School - Merged into Pointe Coupee Central High School in 1991
- Upper Pointe Coupee High School (at a previous point Batchelor High School) - Merged into Pointe Coupee Central High School in 1991
