= John F. Kennedy High School (Louisiana) =

Public school in Louisiana, United States

Location
- 6026 Paris Ave. New Orleans, Louisiana 70122; United States; 30.0191°N 90.0757°W

Information
- School type: Public Charter
- Established: 2018
- Teaching staff: 48.00 (FTE)
- Grades: 9-12
- Gender: Co-ed
- Enrollment: 625 (2023–2024)
- Student to teacher ratio: 13.02
- Campus type: Urban
- Colors: Royal blue and collegiate gold
- Athletics: LHSAA
- Team name: Cougars
- Website: https://www.lantechs.org/

John F. Kennedy High School is a high school located in the Gentilly neighborhood of New Orleans, Louisiana in the United States. It is a charter school under the Orleans Parish School Board (OPSB).

== History ==
=== Original John F. Kennedy High School ===
The original John F. Kennedy High School located in City Park closed due to flooding and damage caused by Hurricane Katrina in the fall of 2005.

=== Greater Gentilly High School ===
In August 2009, a $39 million school building opened at 6026 Paris Ave. and became Greater Gentilly High School.

=== Lake Area New Tech Early College High School ===
In 2011, Greater Gentilly High School and Thurgood Marshall Early College High School merged and Lake Area New Tech Early College High School opened in the former Greater Gentilly High School building.

=== John F. Kennedy High School ===
In July 2018, John F. Kennedy High School reopened in the former Greater Gentilly and Lake Area New Tech Early College High School building and was run by the New Beginnings Schools Foundation. In July 2019, it was announced that The New Beginnings Foundation would relinquish control of John F. Kennedy following a grade-changing scandal.

In August 2019 KIPP New Orleans stated that it was interested in taking management of this school. OPSB Superintendent Henderson Lewis, Jr. gave approval that month; it would be effective the next school year.

== Extracurricular activities ==
- Beta Club
- Cheerleading
- Choir
- Dance Team
- Debate Team
- DECA
- Drama Club
- Drill Team
- Flag Team
- Majorettes
- Marching Band
- National Honor Society
- Robotics Club
- Student Ambassadors
- Student Council

== Athletics ==
=== John F. Kennedy athletics ===
John F. Kennedy athletics competes in the LHSAA.

- Baseball
- Basketball (Boys and Girls)
- Football
- Softball
- Track & Field (Boys and Girls)
- Volleyball

=== Original John F. Kennedy athletics history ===
Baseball

- 2003–2004 - State Playoffs

1993-94 District Champions State Playoffs

1995-96 District Champions State Playoffs

Basketball

- 1980–1981 Co-District Champions, State Playoffs (Boys)

1993-94 District Champions State Playoffs 1994-95 District Champions State Playoffs 1995-96 State Playoffs

- 2002–2003 - State Playoffs, Regional (Boys)
- 2003–2004 - State Playoffs, Regional (Boys)
- 2003–2004 - State Playoffs, (Girls)
- 2004–2005 - State Playoffs, Regional (Boys)
- 2004–2005 - State Playoffs, (Girls)

Football

- 1970–1971 - State Playoffs
- 1971–1972 - State Playoffs
- 1985–1986 - State Playoffs
- 1986–1987 - State Playoffs
- 1990–1991 - State Playoffs
- 1999–2000 - State Playoffs
- 2000–2001 - State Playoffs
- 2001–2002 - State Playoffs
- 2002–2003 - State Playoffs

Track and Field

- 1981–1982 - 9-AAAA District / City Champions; State runner-up

Wrestling

- 1970–1971 - State Runner Up
- 1971–1972 - State Champions

== Notable alumni ==
=== Original John F. Kennedy alumni ===
- Terence Blanchard - American jazz trumpeter, movie score writer predominantly with Spike Lee Films
- David Duke - Former Republican Louisiana State Representative in District 81 and member/former Grand Wizard of the KKK
- Dion Gales - NFL defensive end
- Jessie Hoffman Jr. - Death row inmate
- Randy Jackson - Rock musician with the band Zebra
- Young Greatness - Rapper
- 5th Ward Weebie - Rapper & Bounce music Artist
- Alvin "Joey" Lindsey - of the Indie Rock band The Knux Alongside his brother Kentrell Lindsey
- Carldell Johnson - NBA point guard. Attended JFK and transferred to Marion Abramson High School for his fourth (senior) year of high school
- JoNell Kennedy - Actress, Dreamgirls, Guess Who
- Irvin Mayfield Jr. - American jazz trumpeter. (Later attended and graduated from NOCCA)
