= Abramson School =

Abramson School can refer to:

- Abramson Science and Technology Charter School, a charter school in New Orleans, Louisiana
- Marion Abramson High School, a former high school in New Orleans, Louisiana, in the location of the current Abramson Science and Technology Charter School
