= McDonogh High School =

McDonogh High School can refer to:

- John McDonogh High School, New Orleans, Louisiana
- McDonogh 35 High School, New Orleans, Louisiana
- McDonogh School, Owings Mills, Maryland

== See also ==
- Maurice J. McDonough High School, Pomfret, Maryland
