= Second Ward High School =

Second Ward High School may refer to:

- Second Ward High School (Edgard, Louisiana), in Edgard, Louisiana
- Second Ward High School (Gloster, Louisiana), in Gloster, Louisiana; see List of former high schools in Louisiana
- Second Ward High School, a former high school for African Americans in Brooklyn (Charlotte, North Carolina)
- Second Ward School in Allegheny, Pennsylvania
