= Marion Abramson =

American civic leader (1905–1965)

Marion Pfeifer Abramson
- Born: Marion Pfeifer; August 29, 1905; New York City
- Died: November 30, 1965 (aged 60); New Orleans
- Occupation: Civic leader
- Known for: WYES-TV

Marion Pfeifer Abramson (August 29, 1905 – November 30, 1965) was a civic leader in New Orleans, Louisiana, and the founder of WYES-TV.

== Early life and education ==
Marion Pfeifer was born in New York City on August 29, 1905, and grew up in New Orleans with her parents Leon Pfeifer and Bertha Cahn. She attended Isidore Newman School and H. Sophie Newcomb Memorial College and studied at the Tulane University School of Medicine. At Tulane, she ghostwrote newspaper columns for football players Jerry Dalrymple and Don Zimmerman. In June 1925, she married Louis Abramson Jr.

== Career ==
In the 1940s, Abramson joined the national board of the American Association of University Women and later became president of its New Orleans chapter. In 1953, she founded the Greater New Orleans Educational Television Association with other civic leaders. WYES-TV went on the air in 1957 as the city's third television station and the twelfth educational television station in the United States. In the 1940s and 1950s, she served in local Democratic Party leadership positions.

== Legacy ==
Abramson died in New Orleans on November 30, 1965. Marion Abramson High School had been dedicated to her the previous September. After the school was abandoned in 2005, her name was retained on the schools that replaced it, Abramson Science and Technology Charter School and Abramson Sci Academy.
