= Ashland, Louisiana =

Ashland, Louisiana may refer to:

- Ashland, Natchitoches Parish, Louisiana, a village
- Ashland, Terrebonne Parish, Louisiana, an unincorporated community
- Ashland, Tensas Parish, Louisiana, an unincorporated community
