= New Roads High School =

New Roads High School may refer to:

- New Roads High School (California), Santa Monica, California
- Rosenwald High School (New Roads, Louisiana), formerly New Roads High School
