= Rosenwald High School (New Roads, Louisiana) =

School in New Roads, Louisiana, US (1922–1991)

Location
- 1100 New Roads Street, New Roads, Louisiana, U.S. 30.705096°N 91.435708°W

Information
- Former names: New Roads Rosenwald Elementary School; New Roads High School; New Roads Rosenwald High School
- Established: 1922
- Closed: 1991

Rosenwald High School was a Rosenwald School located on Louisiana Highway 10 in the city of New Roads, Louisiana, United States. It was opened in 1922 as New Roads Rosenwald Elementary School and was located on upper Cemetery Street. It was formerly known as New Roads High School, and New Roads Rosenwald High School.

== History ==
It was as an all-Black school when it opened in 1922 as New Roads Rosenwald Elementary School. It went up through the seventh grade, and was built with funding from the Rosenwald Foundation.

In 1950, an all-Black high school, New Roads High School, was opened in the city of New Roads, Louisiana. This new school was the first high school for African Americans in Pointe Coupee Parish, Louisiana. In 1958, the school was merged with Rosenwald Elementary School and was moved to the New Roads Street location. At this merger, the school was called New Roads Rosenwald High School. The name was later changed to Rosenwald High School.

=== Integration ===
In 1980, Rosenwald High was partnered with the mostly white Poydras High School as part of a desegregation plan similar to that involving Batchelor High School and Innis High School. After Poydras High closed in 1981, Rosenwald became the only public high school in New Roads, and the only magnet high school in the parish.

It was a high school in the Pointe Coupee Parish Public School system until after the 1990–91 school year, when the high school was closed down as part of a plan to combine all parish public schools into the newly formed Pointe Coupee Central High School. The school's mascots was the Trojans. It was named after the philanthropist, Julius Rosenwald.

=== Current usage ===
The old Rosenwald High School building, located at 1100 New Roads Street, is currently Rosenwald Elementary School.

== See also ==
- List of Rosenwald schools
