= Livonia High School =

Livonia High School may refer to:

- Livonia High School (Louisiana) in Livonia, Louisiana
- Livonia High School (Michigan) in Livonia, Michigan
- Livonia High School (New York) in Livonia, New York
