= Goldonna, Louisiana =

- Village
- Village of Goldonna
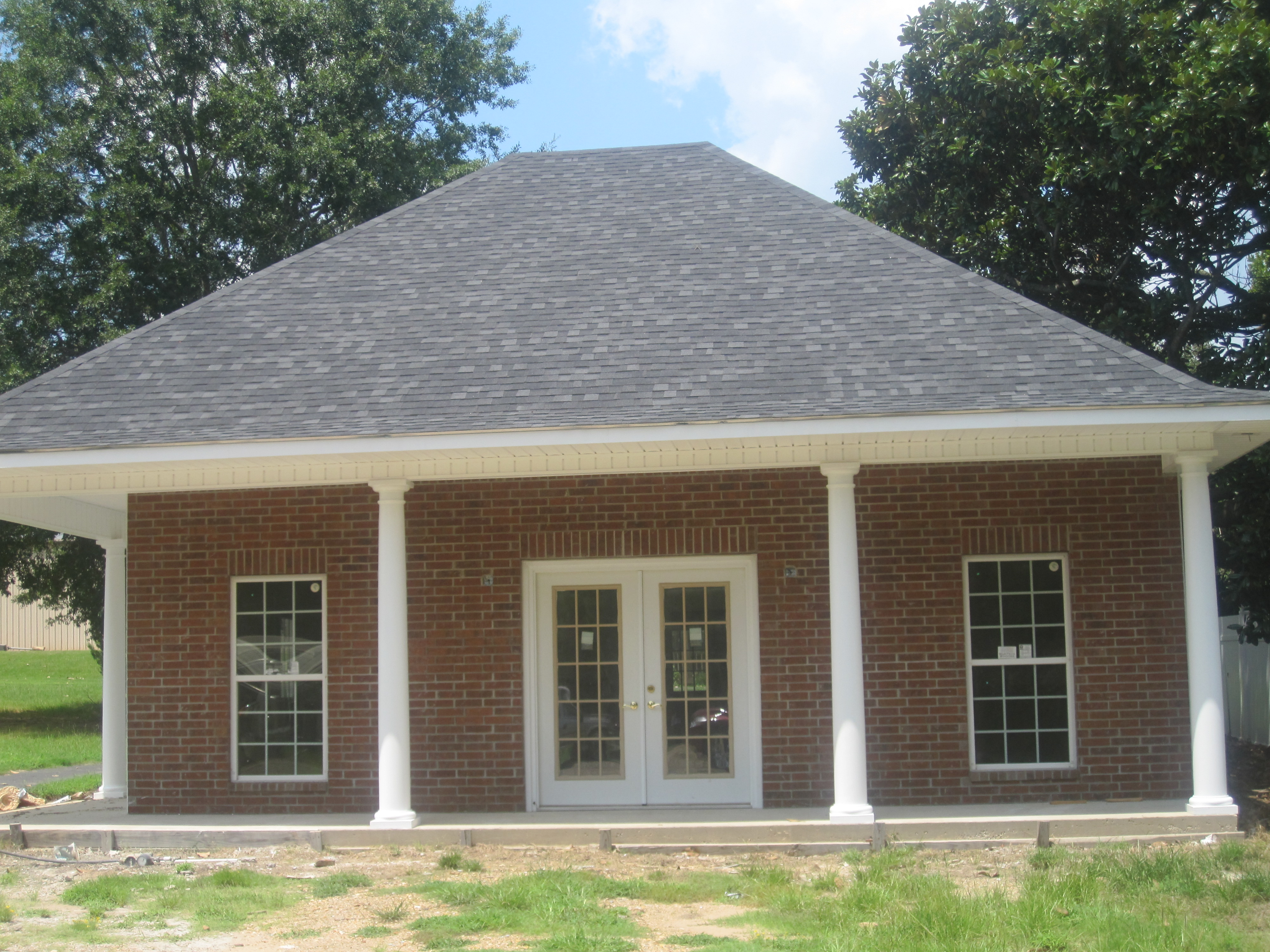
- Goldonna Town Hall

- Location of Goldonna in Natchitoches Parish, Louisiana.

- Location of Louisiana in the United States
- Coordinates: 32°01′14″N 92°54′44″W
- Country: United States
- State: Louisiana
- Parish: Natchitoches

Government
  - Mayor: Jennifer Garner Smith (R)
  - Aldermen: List of alderman: Reed Franklin (R); Fonda Garner (NP); Norvel Garner (NP)

Area
  - Total: 13.15 sq mi (34.06 km^{2})
  - Land: 13.07 sq mi (33.85 km^{2})
  - Water: 0.081 sq mi (0.21 km^{2})
- Elevation: 144 ft (44 m)

Population (2020)
  - Total: 428
  - Rank: NC: 6th
  - Density: 32.7/sq mi (12.64/km^{2})
- Time zone: UTC-6 (CST)
  - Summer (DST): UTC-5 (CDT)
- Area code: 318
- FIPS code: 22-29745

Goldonna is a village in Natchitoches Parish, Louisiana, United States. As of the 2020 census, Goldonna had a population of 428. It is part of the Natchitoches Micropolitan Statistical Area. South of Goldonna along Louisiana Highway 156, one may access Saline Bayou, popular for blackwater canoeing.

== Geography ==
According to the United States Census Bureau, the village has a total area of 11.0 square miles (28 km^{2}), all land.

== Demographics ==
Historical population
Census	Pop.	Note	%±
1930	260		—
1940	256		−1.5%
1950	364		42.2%
1960	292		−19.8%
1970	337		15.4%
1980	526		56.1%
1990	417		−20.7%
2000	457		9.6%
2010	430		−5.9%
2020	428		−0.5%
2025 (est.)	416	▼	−2.8%
U.S. Decennial Census

=== 2020 census ===
Goldonna racial composition
Race	Number	Percentage
White (non-Hispanic)	409	95.56%
Black or African American (non-Hispanic)	1	0.23%
Native American	3	0.7%
Pacific Islander	1	0.23%
Other/Mixed	10	2.34%
Hispanic or Latino	4	0.93%

As of the 2020 United States census, there were 428 people, 146 households, and 90 families residing in the village.

=== 2000 census ===
As of the census of 2000, there were 457 people, 163 households, and 131 families residing in the village. The population density was 41.5 inhabitants per square mile (16.0/km^{2}). There were 192 housing units at an average density of 17.4 per square mile (6.7/km^{2}). The racial makeup of the village was 98.47% White, 0.66% Native American, 0.22% Pacific Islander, 0.22% from other races, and 0.44% from two or more races. Hispanic or Latino of any race were 0.44% of the population.

There were 163 households, out of which 39.3% had children under the age of 18 living with them, 63.8% were married couples living together, 10.4% had a female householder with no husband present, and 19.6% were non-families. 17.2% of all households were made up of individuals, and 11.7% had someone living alone who was 65 years of age or older. The average household size was 2.80 and the average family size was 3.15.

In the village, the population was spread out, with 28.9% under the age of 18, 11.4% from 18 to 24, 25.6% from 25 to 44, 24.3% from 45 to 64, and 9.8% who were 65 years of age or older. The median age was 31 years. For every 100 females, there were 101.3 males. For every 100 females age 18 and over, there were 94.6 males.

The median income for a household in the village was $27,500, and the median income for a family was $32,656. Males had a median income of $26,875 versus $17,000 for females. The per capita income for the village was $12,207. About 20.2% of families and 23.1% of the population were below the poverty line, including 17.7% of those under age 18 and 32.0% of those age 65 or over.

== Government ==
The Mayor of Goldonna is Jennifer Garner Smith, a Republican. The three Aldermen are Norvel Garner (No Party), Fonda Garner (No Party), and Reed Franklin, Republican.

== Education ==
The Goldonna Elementary/Junior High School serves pre-kindergarten through grade 8. Pupils come from as far away as the village of Ashland to the west, where the defunct Ashland High School was located.

== Notable people ==
- Gordon Gunter, fisheries scientist
- Patricia Maxwell, romance novelist
- Riley J. Wilson, politician

== Gallery ==
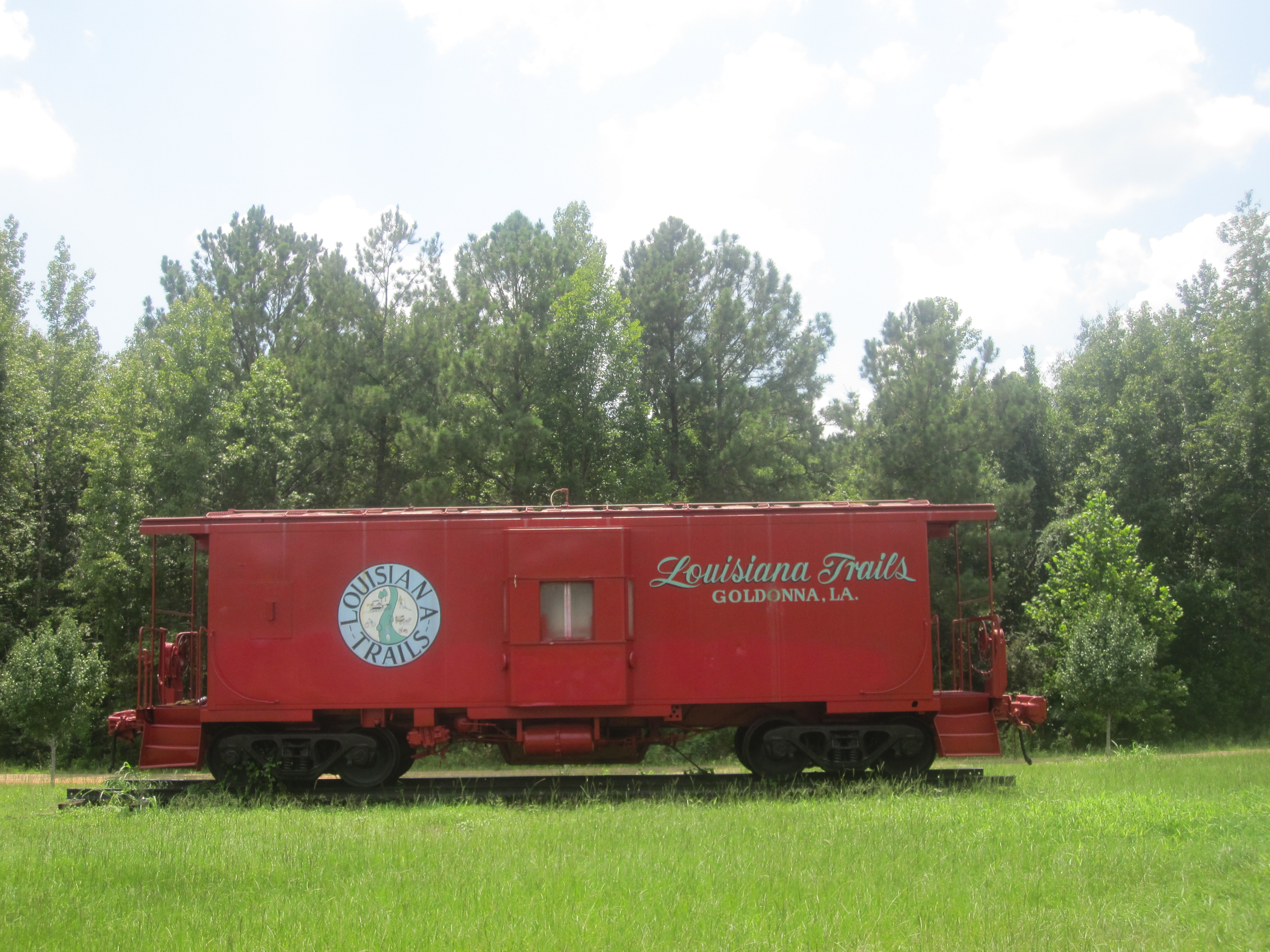
Louisiana Trails railroad car in Goldonna

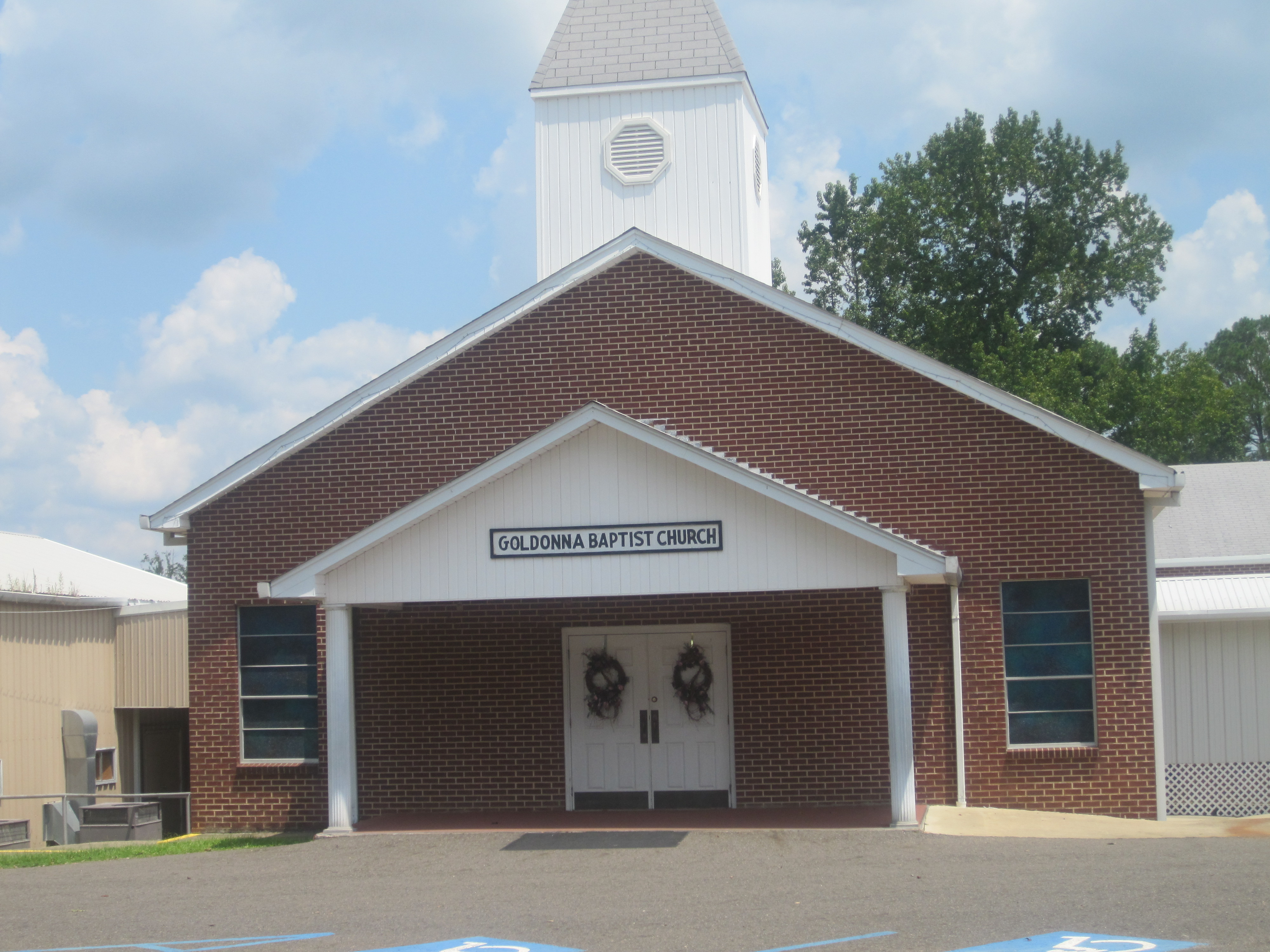
Goldonna Baptist Church

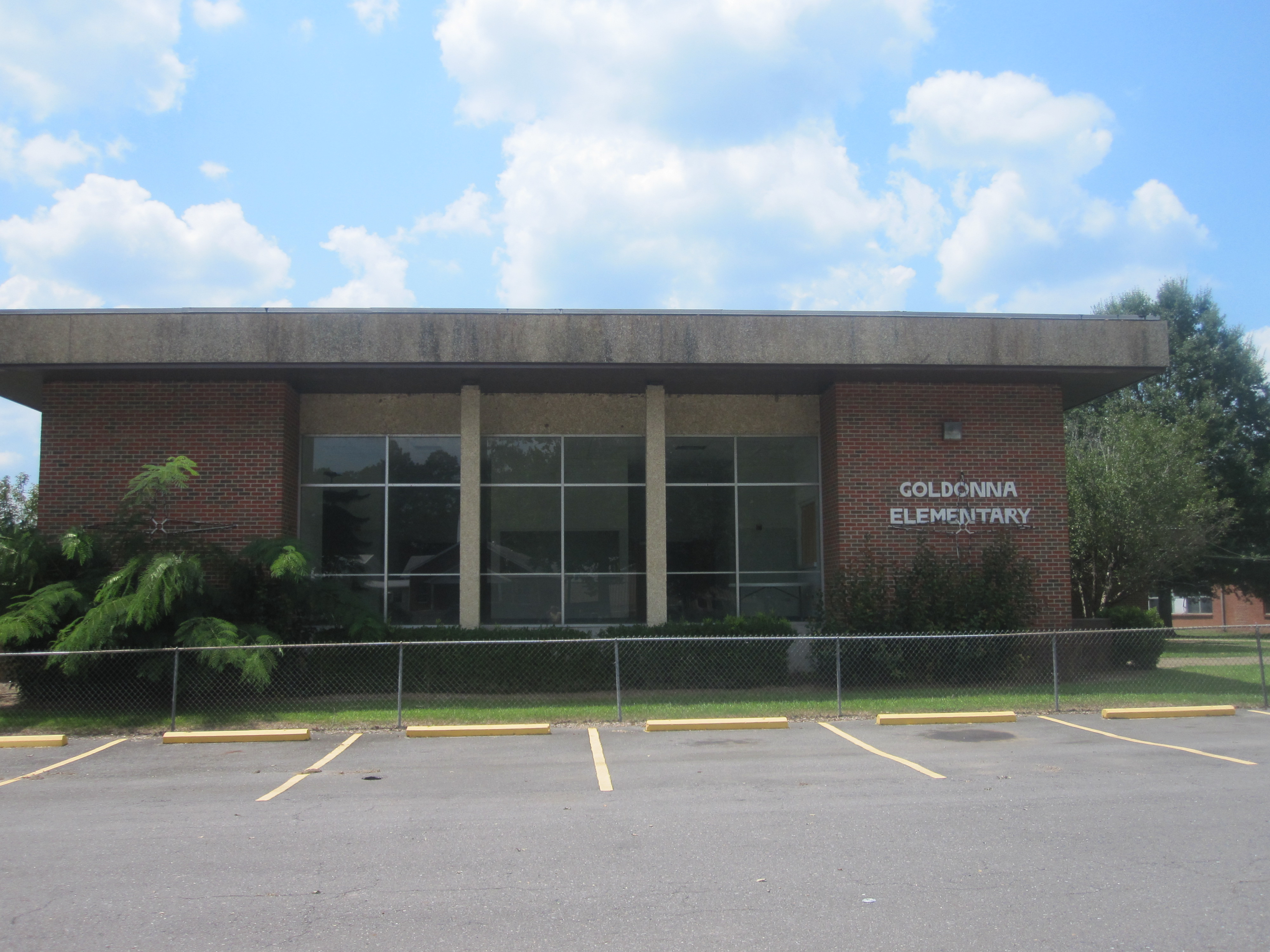
Goldonna Elementary School
