= 2003 John McDonogh High School shooting =

Mass shooting in New Orleans, Louisiana

- Location: 29.9688°N 90.0652°W; New Orleans, Louisiana, U.S.
- Date: April 14, 2003; 23 years ago c. 10:30 a.m. (CDT; UTC−05:00)
- Attack type: School shooting; mass shooting
- Weapons: AK-47 semi-automatic rifle; 9mm semi-automatic pistol
- Deaths: 1
- Injuries: 4 (3 by gunfire, one by trampling)
- Victim: Jonathan "Caveman" Williams
- Perpetrators: Steven R. Williams; James Tate

On April 14, 2003, a school shooting took place at John McDonogh High School in the Mid-City neighborhood of New Orleans, Louisiana, United States. Two teenagers shot and killed 15-year-old student Jonathan "Caveman" Williams during a mid-morning gym class in a gang neighborhood retaliation killing.

== Details ==
At 10:30 a.m. on April 14, 2003, two men armed with an AK-47 and a semi-automatic pistol entered the school property via gaps in the fence. Immediately after students and faculty entered the school gymnasium, the two men shot at 15-year-old Jonathan "Caveman" Williams at least 20 times. Three female students were wounded, and a pregnant senior was trampled by a stampede of students. Jonathan Williams died at the scene and the two perpetrators immediately fled the school campus. The injured recovered. Doctor James Taylor did the autopsy and later testified that Williams was struck by 10 bullets, and in addition, a lead fragment left a laceration on the left side of his neck. Taylor also found a pistol in Williams' waistband and determined that there were no drugs or alcohol in his system.

After the event, officers commanded by Jimmy Keen, a lieutenant with the New Orleans Police Department, attempted to interview witnesses at school and their houses. A TIME magazine news story described the event as having 150 witnesses. Keen said that the students responded to questions from the officers with "shrugs and stares." Keen said that his sergeant stated he feels "like the Marine Expeditionary Force in Iraq. The people in the neighborhoods don't want us here. They don't speak our language. They won't talk to us.'"

== Involved parties ==
It was eventually determined in court that Steven R. Williams (no relation to Jonathan Williams) and James Tate committed the shootings, while Raymond Brown, Tyrone Crump, Herbert Everett, (a John McDonogh student) and Michelle Fulton (also a John McDonogh Student and girlfriend of deceased Smith) conspired in the killing. The two killers were told that Williams conspired in the murder of Hillard "Head" Smith IV, a Joseph S. Clark High School student, and Brown's cousin. Hillard Smith was found dead from gunshot wounds in front of an abandoned house on April 7, one week before Jonathan Williams died.

Articles of The Times-Picayune stated police believed that Smith's friends and family felt Jonathan Williams killed Hillard Smith.

== Later murders ==
On October 27, 2003, two people related to Jonathan Williams's killers received fatal injuries after an ambush: 76-year-old Myrtis Bickham, a retired automobile mechanic and Smith's grandfather, and 31-year-old Roosevelt Brown Jr., one of Smith's cousins, were hit with assault rifle gunfire shortly after 9:00 PM outside 2324 Ursuline Street. Brown had a handgun with him at the time of his death; a The Times-Picayune article said that he may have worried about his own safety. Bickham received gunshot wounds to the head and torso and was declared dead at the scene. Roosevelt Brown also sustained head and torso wounds; he died hours after the shooting at the Medical Center of Louisiana. On October 30, a close friend of the Brown family died; 24-year-old Kenya Ambrose, a welder at an Avondale, Jefferson Parish shipyard, died at the 2300 block of St. Bernard Avenue three days after the killings of Bickham and Roosevelt Brown occurred; the location of Ambrose's death is within walking distance of Bickham's house. Police believe that Ambrose died because of his relationship with the Brown family.

Investigators believed that the Williams family was not directly responsible for the killings; investigators said that friends and associates of Jonathan Williams tried to avenge the high school student's death by killing everyone that they believed had responsibility for the death, even though the suspects were already in prison.

== Aftermath ==
Jacquielynn Floyd of The Dallas Morning News said that the story would not have made national headlines if the killers had not killed Jonathan Williams in a school gymnasium and injured three bystanders and instead killed him off campus.

The court system convicted Steven Williams of second degree murder and he received a life sentence. (In Louisiana, current laws dictate that a second degree murder conviction equals a mandatory life imprisonment without possibility of parole or early release.) Tate pleaded guilty to manslaughter and conspiracy to commit second degree murder and received a 15-year sentence. On September 20, 2006, four people with less direct involvement pleaded guilty and received their sentences. Raymond Brown pleaded guilty to criminal conspiracy to commit second degree murder and received nine years. Crump pleaded guilty to "accessory after the fact" and received five years. Everett pleaded guilty to criminal conspiracy to commit second degree murder and received five years. Fulton pleaded guilty to the same charge as Everett and Raymond Brown and received five years. Everett and Fulton, in prison since 2003, received credit for time served after sentencing in 2006. Crump and Raymond Brown made bail months prior to the sentencing and faced re-arrest due to a weapons charge.

== See also ==
- List of school shootings in the United States
- List of school shootings in the United States by death toll
