= Emanuel Weaver =

American football player (born 1960)

No. 70, 69, 68
- Position: Nose tackle

Personal information
- Born: June 28, 1960 (age 66); New Orleans, Louisiana, U.S.
- Listed height: 6 ft 4 in (1.93 m)
- Listed weight: 260 lb (118 kg)

Career information
- High school: John McDonogh (New Orleans)
- College: South Carolina
- NFL draft: 1982: 2nd round, 54th overall pick

Career history
- Cincinnati Bengals (1982–1983); New Jersey Generals (1985); New Orleans Saints (1987)*; Atlanta Falcons (1987)
- * Offseason or practice squad member only

Awards and highlights
- First-team All-American (1981)

Career NFL statistics
- Fumble recoveries: 1
- Stats at Pro Football Reference

Emanuel Weaver III (born June 28, 1960) is an American former professional football player who was a nose tackle in the National Football League for the Cincinnati Bengals and Atlanta Falcons. He also was a member of the New Jersey Generals in the United States Football League. He played college football for the South Carolina Gamecocks.

== Early life ==
Born and raised in New Orleans, Louisiana, Weaver attended John McDonogh High School, where he was an offensive lineman. He began his college career at Arizona Western Junior College, playing defensive end as a freshman. He transitioned to tight end as a sophomore, and earned junior college All-American honors. He transferred to the University of South Carolina (USC) for his final two years, and again transitioned to a new position, middle guard. As a senior, he was selected as a first-team All-American by the Newspaper Enterprise Association, despite having injured his knee late in the season.

(Note: most primary sources, such as NFL.com, PFR.com, and PFA.com, mistakenly identify Weaver as having attended South Carolina State University (SCSU). However, he actually attended USC, as can be verified by newspaper accounts from 1980-81, as well as the web site GamecockArchives.com.)

== Professional career ==
Weaver was selected by the Cincinnati Bengals in the second round (54th overall) of the 1982 NFL draft. He was placed on the injured reserve list on August 29, 1983. He was waived on August 28, 1984.

On December 27, 1984, he signed with the New Jersey Generals of the United States Football League. He appeared in 12 games during the 1985 season. He played with the team until the league folded in 1986.

In 1987, he was signed as a free agent by the New Orleans Saints. He was released on August 27.

After the NFLPA strike was declared on the third week of the 1987 season, those contests were canceled (reducing the 16 game season to 15) and the NFL decided that the games would be played with replacement players. In September, he was signed by the Atlanta Falcons to be a part of their replacement team. He appeared in 2 games and was released at the end of the strike on October 19.
