= Al Richardson (end) =

American football player (1935–1977)

No. 79
- Position: Defensive end

Personal information
- Born: February 1, 1935; New Orleans, Louisiana, U.S.
- Died: December 6, 1977 (aged 42); Los Angeles County, California, U.S.
- Listed height: 6 ft 3 in (1.91 m)
- Listed weight: 250 lb (113 kg)

Career information
- High school: Joseph S. Clark (LA)
- College: Grambling State
- NFL draft: 1957: 26th round, 302nd overall pick

Career history
- Philadelphia Eagles (1957)*; Los Angeles Chargers (1960)*; Boston Patriots (1960)
- * Offseason or practice squad member only
- Stats at Pro Football Reference

Alvin Richardson (February 1, 1935 – December 6, 1977) was an American professional football player who played with the Boston Patriots. He played college football at Grambling State University.
