= Roosevelt Taylor =

American football player (1937–2020)

No. 24, 25, 22
- Position: Safety

Personal information
- Born: July 4, 1937; Eudora, Arkansas, U.S.
- Died: May 29, 2020 (aged 82); New Orleans, Louisiana, U.S.
- Listed height: 5 ft 11 in (1.80 m)
- Listed weight: 186 lb (84 kg)

Career information
- High school: Joseph S. Clark Sr. (New Orleans)
- College: Grambling (1957–1960)
- NFL draft: 1961: undrafted

Career history
- Chicago Bears (1961–1969); San Francisco 49ers (1969-1971); Washington Redskins (1972)

Awards and highlights
- NFL champion (1963); First-team All-Pro (1963); Second-team All-Pro (1965); 2× Pro Bowl (1963, 1968); NFL Interceptions co-leader (1963); 100 greatest Bears of All-Time

Career NFL statistics
- Interceptions: 32
- Fumble recoveries: 13
- Total touchdowns: 6
- Stats at Pro Football Reference

Roosevelt "Rosey" Taylor (July 4, 1937 – May 29, 2020) was an American professional football player who was a safety for the Chicago Bears, San Francisco 49ers, and Washington Redskins of the National Football League (NFL). He played college football for the Grambling Tigers. Part of Grambling's initial SWAC championship defense in 1960 – the group included four future All-Pros – Taylor went on to lead the NFL with nine interceptions in 1963, on the way to 32 career picks.

== Early life and college ==
Taylor was born on July 4, 1937, in Eudora, Arkansas to William and Savannah Taylor. He moved to New Orleans when he was four. He was raised in the Lower Ninth Ward, attending McCarthy Elementary School and Joseph S. Clark High School (now defunct), where he played three sports: basketball, football and track; excelling most in basketball. In 1956, he was named a city All-Star in basketball by the Crescent City Coaches Association. While he had great leaping ability, and basketball was his best high school sport, he would be cut twice trying out for his college team; though that leaping ability would become vital to his playing defensive back in football. He was an All-City football player at Clark. In 1962, the school presented him with an award for outstanding achievement in sports.

He went to Grambling State University, and was a football team walk-on before earning a scholarship, playing under coach Eddie Robinson. He worked a number of jobs to pay his tuition before that. He was a key part of Grambling’s 1960 Southwestern Athletic Conference (SWAC) championship team (its first), playing defense. His defensive teammates included future Pro Football Hall of Fame defensive tackle Buck Buchanan, who was selected to the NFL 100th Anniversary All-Time Team, future All-AFL star Ernie Ladd, and future AFL All-Star Garland Boyette. On offense, as a sophomore, he had scoring runs of 87 and 75 yards.

In 2010, he was inducted into the Grambling Legends Sports Hall of Fame (along with Boyette).

== Professional football career ==
Taylor was signed as a free agent by the Chicago Bears in 1961. Bears defensive coach, and future Hall of fame head coach, George Allen went to Grambling in Louisiana to try (unsuccessfully) to sign Ernie Ladd. He learned of Taylor from Eddie Robinson when he asked Robinson about defensive backs, and Allen was able to sign Taylor as a free agent.

Taylor would go on to a 14-year NFL career with the Bears (1961-69), 49ers (1969-71) and Redskins (1972). He and future Hall of fame tight end, and head coach, Mike Ditka were rookies together on the Bears. Taylor's son Brian played briefly for the Bears under coach Ditka in 1989.

As a rookie defensive back in 1962, Taylor made 95 tackles. He was a key defensive player on the 1963 Bears NFL championship team, playing free safety (with fellow New Orleans Sports Hall of Fame member Richie Petitbon at strong safety). He led the Bears in interceptions with nine (returning one for a touchdown), and in kick return yardage (while also returning punts). He also had three fumble recoveries.

In 1963, Taylor was selected first team All-Pro and to the Pro Bowl. George Allen was a defensive assistant coach with the 1963 team, becoming defensive coordinator of the 1964-1965 Bears. The defense also included future hall of fame defensive end Doug Adkins, who was selected to the NFL 100th Anniversary All-Time Team, and future hall of fame linebacker Bill George.

In 1964 he was selected first team All Conference by The Sporting News, and second team All Pro by the Newspaper Enterprise Association (NEA); and in 1965, he was selected second team All Pro by the Associated Press (AP). In 1968, he scored on a 96-yard interception return against the Philadelphia Eagles. He was selected to the Pro Bowl for a second time that year.

During the 1969 season, the Bears traded him and a 1971 fifth round pick to the 49ers for offensive guard Howard Mudd (a member of the NFL's 1960s All Decade Team). Taylor had never missed a game with the Bears, starting 108 of 118 games. He had 23 interceptions and four defensive touchdowns (three on interceptions and one on a fumble) for the Bears over his career.

He started 30 or 34 games played with the 49ers, and in 1970 won the team's Eshmont Award, given for inspirational and courageous play. He had eight interceptions as a 49er. Before the 1972 season, the 49ers traded Taylor to Washington for a future draft pick.

1972 was Taylor's final season in the NFL. He started 14 games for Washington, under his former Bears' defensive coach, George Allen, as part of the Over-the-Hill Gang. He started in Super Bowl VII, where Washington lost 14-7 to the undefeated Miami Dolphins. Washington's defense, however, held Miami hall of fame quarterback Bob Griese to 88 yards passing, and the Dolphins to 69 net passing yards.

Over his full career, Taylor had 32 interceptions, with 486 return yards, three interception touchdowns, and 13 fumble recoveries with one touchdown. Early in his Chicago career, he returned 15 punts (one for a touchdown) and 26 kickoffs.

== Legacy and honors ==
In 2010, Taylor was inducted as a member of the Grambling State University Hall of Fame. In 1979, he was made a member of the Greater New Orleans Sports Hall of Fame, and in 1996 he was inducted into the Louisiana Sports Hall of Fame. In 2019, The Chicago Tribune ranked him the 43rd best player in Chicago Bears team history. In 2019, to celebrate the team's centennial season, Taylor was named the 56th-greatest player in Bears history by Don Pierson and Dan Pompei.

== Personal life and death ==
After retirement, he established the Rosey Taylor Football Camp for underprivileged youth, and had co-sponsored the Rosey Taylor Relays with Clark in his hometown. He was briefly a sportscaster in New Orleans, and owned a number of businesses, most notably the Rosey Taylor Locker Room Lounge, run for two decades and decorated like an actual football locker room.

In 2012, the Nazareth Inn Residents Council dedicated its dining hall to Taylor. Louisiana Governor Bobby Jindal and State Representative Austin Badon presented Taylor with proclamations declaring July 17, 2012, Roosevelt Taylor Day.

Taylor died on May 29, 2020, at the age of 82. At the time of his death, he had been married nearly 60 years to his wife Claudia, and had three children and four grandchildren.
