= Jerome Smith (civil rights activist) =

American civil rights activist (1939–2026)

- Smith in 2016
- Born: May 21, 1939; New Orleans, Louisiana, U.S.
- Died: August 21, 2026 (aged 87); New Orleans, Louisiana, U.S.
- Occupation: Civil rights activist
- Children: 4

Jerome Smith (May 21, 1939 – August 21, 2026), nicknamed "Big Duck", was an American civil rights activist.

== Early life and career ==
Smith was born in New Orleans, Louisiana on May 21, 1939, the son of Walter Smith, a merchant seaman, and Leona Juluke, a seamstress. He attended Joseph S. Clark High School. He also attended Southern University in Baton Rouge, Louisiana, but dropped out in his sophomore year.

In 1961, Smith joined the Freedom Riders, and devoted himself to the Congress of Racial Equality, helping the organization in raising funds and registering Black voters in the South. After participating in a lunch counter sit-in where he fought for desegregation, he was arrested and placed in jail in his hometown. Along with the Freedom Riders in November 1961, they rode a bus to McComb, Mississippi, and he suffered a traumatic brain injury from a beating.

In 1963, after being treated for his injuries in New York, Smith confronted U.S. attorney general Robert F. Kennedy about failing to protect Black civil rights activists. In 1968, he co-founded Tamborine and Fan, an organization in his hometown. According to The Times-Picayune/The New Orleans Advocate, he was named a "freedom fighter" by U.S. representative Troy Carter.

== Personal life and death ==
According to The New York Times, Smith had three daughters and a son.

Smith died of cancer at his home in New Orleans, Louisiana, on August 21, 2026, at the age of 87.
