= Angie Jones =

American software developer

- Born: New Orleans
- Education: Tennessee State University, North Carolina State University
- Occupations: Software developer, inventor
- Employers: Applitools; Durham Technical Community College; IBM; LexisNexis; Teradata; Twitter, Inc.
- Website: angiejones.tech

Angie Jones is a software engineer and automation architect who specializes in software testing and development. She has contributed to several open-source testing tools and libraries, including Selenium and Appium.

== Early life and education ==
Jones was born in New Orleans, Louisiana, where she attended Marion Abramson Senior High School. After graduating from high school, Jones enrolled as a business major at Tennessee State University. However, an introductory C++ course sparked her interest in tech, and Jones changed her major to Computer Science as a result. Jones earned a Bachelor of Science in computer science from Tennessee State University, and she earned a master's degree in computer science from North Carolina State University in 2010.

== Career ==
Jones began her career in 2003 at IBM in Research Triangle Park, North Carolina as a software engineer for nine years. In 2007, she became the CEO of Diva Chix, an online fashion game "where teenage girls and women acquire skills in technology, entrepreneurship, leadership and participate in fashion competitions". The game is still active, and Jones remains the CEO and sole developer.

Jones became an adjunct professor at Durham Technical Community College in 2014, where she taught Java programming courses until 2017. Jones worked with LexisNexis as a Consulting Automation Engineer in 2015. In 2016, she began speaking at software conferences globally and became an international keynote speaker in 2017.

In 2017, Jones joined Twitter as a Senior Automation Engineer. The following year, she joined Applitools, an AI-powered visual testing and monitoring platform, to start their Developer Relations initiative. As part of her role at Applitools, Jones created Test Automation University, an online platform for programming and test automation subjects taught by herself and other experts.

In 2021, Jones joined Block as the Head of Developer Relations for their open-source decentralized exchange platform, TBD54566975. She holds 26 patented inventions in the United States of America and China.

Jones has authored chapters in multiple software engineering books including The Digital Quality Handbook: Guide for Achieving Continuous Quality in a DevOps Reality, DevOps: Implementing Cultural Change, and 97 Things Every Java Programmer Should Know.

== Volunteering ==
Jones volunteers with Black Girls Code, where she led the Raleigh-Durham Chapter from 2015 to 2017. Jones also volunteered with TechGirlz, where she planned and taught technology workshops for middle-school girls from 2015 to 2017. Jones is an active member of Alpha Kappa Alpha sorority.
