= Firstline Schools =

Firstline Schools is a charter school operator in New Orleans, Louisiana. Firstline currently operates four K-8 schools as well as one high school.

== K-8 Schools ==
Firstline schools currently operates four elementary schools: Samuel J. Green Charter School, Arthur Ashe Charter School, Langston Hughes Academy, and Phillis Wheatley Community School. Firstline additionally operates a program called "Edible School Yard." The stated goal of Edible School Yard is "to improve the long-term well being of our students, families, and school community, by integrating hands-on organic gardening and seasonal cooking into the school curriculum, culture, and cafeteria programs."

== Joseph S. Clark Preparatory High School ==
Firstline schools currently operates one high school, Joseph S. Clark Preparatory High School. Clark is located in Tremé opened in 1947 as the second high school in New Orleans open to African-Americans. Named after Joseph S. Clark, the first president of the Southern University at Baton Rouge The ReBirth Brass Band formed in 1983 at the school. Clark is now a charter school operated by Firstline Schools. The future of Clark High School has been brought into question, due to the school's consistent inability to retain a principal and its low desirability in the New Orleans community as a first choice school. Firstline chose to address these issues by cutting the 9th grade class for the 2016- 2017 school year and expanding vocational offerings for its matriculating 10th- 12th graders. While it was rumored that the school would shut down, it has been recently announced that Firstline will be partnering with another charter operator in the same building so that current Clark students can continue to attend school in the same building.
