= Monk Williams =

American football player (1945–2003)

No. 6, 3, 16, 22
- Position: Flanker

Personal information
- Born: February 15, 1945; Shreveport, Louisiana, U.S.
- Died: March 18, 2003 (aged 58); Durham, North Carolina, U.S.
- Listed height: 5 ft 7 in (1.70 m)
- Listed weight: 155 lb (70 kg)

Career information
- High school: Clark (New Orleans, Louisiana)
- College: Arkansas AM&N (1964–1967)
- NFL draft: 1968: 6th round, 163rd overall pick

Career history
- Cincinnati Bengals (1968); Orlando Panthers (1969); Norfolk Neptunes (1970–1971)

Awards and highlights
- All-COFL (1969)

Career AFL statistics
- Return yards: 126
- Stats at Pro Football Reference

Charles Lee "Monk" Williams (February 15, 1945 – March 18, 2003) was an American professional football flanker who played one season with the Cincinnati Bengals of the American Football League (AFL). He was selected by the Bengals in the sixth round of the 1968 NFL/AFL draft after playing college football at Arkansas Agricultural, Mechanical and Normal College.

== Early life and college ==
Charles Lee Williams was born on February 15, 1945, in Shreveport, Louisiana. He attended Joseph S. Clark High School in New Orleans, Louisiana.

He was a member of the Arkansas AM&N Golden Lions football team from 1964 to 1967. He was inducted into the school's athletic Hall of Fame in 2002.

== Professional career ==
Williams was selected by the Cincinnati Bengals in the sixth round, with the 163rd overall pick, of the 1968 NFL/AFL draft. He officially signed with the team on February 6, 1968. He played in two games for the Bengals during their inaugural 1968 season, returning five kicks for 112 yards and two punts for 14 yards, before being released on September 17, 1968. He was listed as a flanker while with the Bengals.

Williams was a split end/defensive back for the Orlando Panthers of the Continental Football League (COFL) in 1969, rushing 25 times for 166 yards and three touchdowns, catching three passes for one yard, returning 21 kicks for 636 yards, and returning 17 punts for 197 yards. He earned All-COFL honors for his performance during the 1969 season.

Williams was a halfback for the Norfolk Neptunes of the Atlantic Coast Football League (ACFL) in 1970, totaling 61 carries for 202 yards and one touchdown, 12 receptions for 155 yards and one touchdown, and 19 kickoff returns for 535 yards and one touchdown. He was listed as a running back for the Neptunes in 1971, recording two rushing touchdowns, one receiving touchdown, and 21 kickoff returns for 536 yards and one touchdown.

== Personal life ==
Williams died on March 18, 2003, in Durham, North Carolina.
