= John McDonogh High School =

John McDonogh Senior High School
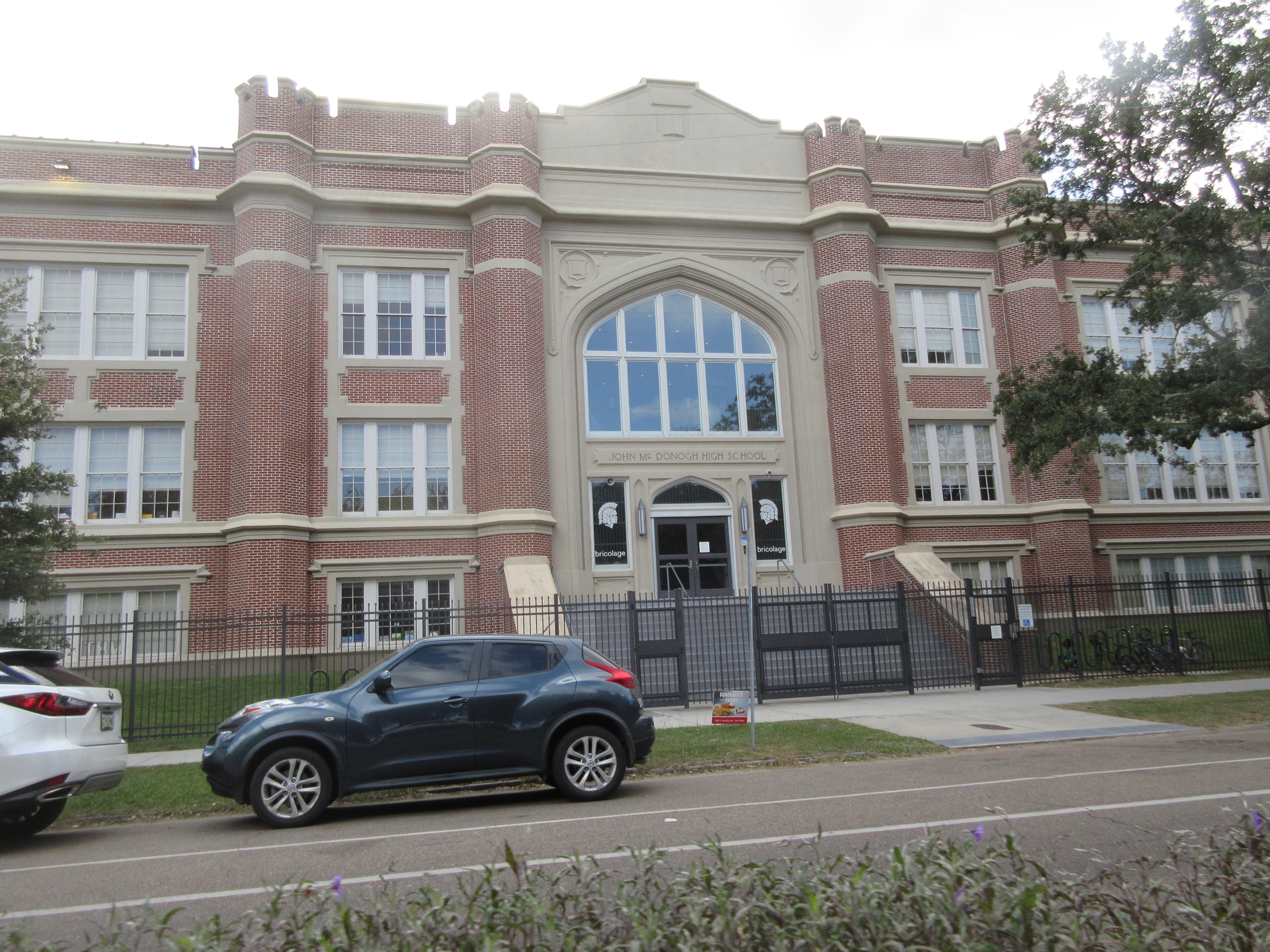

Location
- 2426 Esplanade Avenue; New Orleans, Louisiana; United States; 29°58′08″N 90°03′55″W

Information
- Type: Public
- Established: 1902
- School district: Recovery School District
- Grades: 9–12
- Colors: Green and gold
- Athletics conference: LHSAA
- Team name: Trojans

John McDonogh Senior High School (nicknamed John Mac) was a public charter high school in the Mid-City neighborhood of New Orleans, Louisiana, United States. The school was named after John McDonogh (1779 – 1850).

Since 2018, the former high school building has been home to Bricolage Academy, an elementary charter school operated by Bricolage Academy.

== History ==
=== John McDonogh Senior High School ===
The high school opened in 1902 and as an all-girls school. It became co-educational and was white only. It integrated after 1967 with desegregation. Of the New Orleans public schools, it once had an academic reputation second only to Benjamin Franklin High School. John McDonogh, whose sports teams were nicknamed the "Trojans", had a vast sport history, winning district championships in football, baseball, and basketball a combined 83 times in its 109-year history.

John McDonogh became the center of national news when on April 14, 2003, tenth-grade student Jonathan "Caveman" Williams was shot and killed in the school's crowded gymnasium during a physical education class.

Prior to Hurricane Katrina in 2005, it had an average enrollment of 1,200, making it one of the largest high schools per enrollment in Orleans Parish.

In 2010, Paul Vallas, the superintendent of the Recovery School District, said that McDonogh should be converted into a charter school. Some teachers argued against the charter conversion. As of 2010, nobody has filed an application to convert McDonogh. In 2012, "Future is Now" took over all classes at John McDonogh and there were 389 students enrolled at the school.

As of February 2013, John McDonogh was featured on a six-episode reality series entitled Blackboard Wars on Oprah Winfrey Network. Sandra Ewell, a woman quoted in an article by WWL-TV, argued "They're calling this school the worst school in America. These children are living up to that. They're giving it very negative connotations. These children have to go to school with that title and that's wrong." The series was originally produced with the intention of showing a school improving under charter school operation. On October 1, 2013, there were 311 students enrolled at John McDonogh.

In March 2014, the Recovery School District announced that McDonogh would be renovated, so the school would close temporarily. When it reopens, Future is Now would not continue operations at the school. Steve Barr, the head of Future is Now, stated that there was simply not enough demand for the school, in that not enough students wanted to attend. Several individuals asked the Louisiana Board of Elementary and Secondary Education (BESE) to return to the school to direct control of New Orleans Public Schools, but the BESE instead voted to let the RSD ask for another charter school operator. Danielle Dreilinger of The Times Picayune wrote that "John Mac has become a flashpoint for tensions over the continuing role of the Recovery system."

On 2016, McDonogh was closed for extensive renovations and the school reopened in 2017.

=== Bricolage Academy ===
In February 2015, Louisiana Civil District Judge Piper Griffin issued a restraining order that prevented RSD from announcing the preferred charter school operator. The decision was still delayed in March of that year. In April 2015, RSD announced that Bricolage Academy, a charter elementary school, would take over the space for McDonogh. Bricolage will be under the authority of the Orleans Parish School Board. KIPP New Orleans had wanted the John Mac campus for its Believe Elementary School but it was turned down in favor of Bricolage. In 2018, the school building opened as Bricolage Academy.

== Notable alumni ==
=== John McDonogh Senior High School ===
- Blaq N Mild, Grammy nominated producer of Drake songs Nice For What and In My Feelings.
- Corey Dowden, former NFL player
- Marguerite Oswald, mother of Lee Harvey Oswald
- Bennie Thompson, former NFL player
- DJ Hollygrove, Grammy Winning DJ, on air DJ Shade 45
- Ron Washington, Los Angeles Angels and Texas Rangers manager and former MLB player (Los Angeles Dodgers, Minnesota Twins, Baltimore Orioles, Cleveland Indians, Houston Astros)
- Emanuel Weaver, former NFL player
