= Livonia High School (Louisiana) =

Location
- 3118 LA Highway 78; Livonia, Louisiana 70755; United States; 30.55914°N 91.55519°W

Information
- Other name: LHS
- Type: Public high school
- School district: Pointe Coupee Parish School Board
- NCES School ID: 220126001029
- Principal: Dr. Rosie Courville
- Teaching staff: 63.02 (on an FTE basis)
- Grades: 7–12
- Enrollment: 978 (2023–2024)
- Student to teacher ratio: 15.52
- Colors: Green and gold
- Athletics conference: Louisiana High School Athletic Association
- Nickname: Wildcats
- Website: www.pcpsb.net/o/lhs

Livonia High School (LHS) is a public high school in Livonia, Louisiana, United States. It was established in 1915 and is part of the Pointe Coupee Parish School Board.

== History ==
The present Livonia High School was established in Livonia in 1915. The following year, 1916, this school was combined to also include all of the students from Valverda and Dreyfus schools. The present Livonia High building was built in 1936. It was originally a two-story brick building. The second floor was lost to a fire in 1971. During the 1990/1991 school year, Livonia High was scheduled to be closed down as part of a parish-wide school consolidation plan that resulted in the establishment of Pointe Coupee Central High School. Because parents in Livonia and the surrounding area protested the closure, Livonia High School remained open; however, other Pointe Coupee Parish Schools closed and students transferred to Pointe Coupee Central High School. The school serves approximately 1000 students (7th through 12th grade) living in the southern region of Pointe Coupee Parish.

In 2011, the school became home to the United States Air Force JROTC (AFJROTC) detachment LA-935. This detachment had previously been headquartered at nearby Pointe Coupee Central High School. The JROTC program was discontinued after the 2014 school year.

== Faculty ==
The school faculty is made up of approximately 58 teachers and staff who instruct in a wide array of courses including, Advanced Math, Algebra, Integrated Math, General Math, English, Study Skills, Physical Education, American History, World Geography, Civics, Social Studies, World History, Free Enterprise, Keyboarding, Word Processing, Geometry, French language, Art, Choir, Introduction to Health Professions, Louisiana History, Auto Mechanics, Carpentry, Nursing, Welding, Reading, Chemistry, Environmental Science, Physics, Physical Science, Business English, Technical Writing, Biology, Publications, Special Education, and Agriculture.

== Athletics ==
Livonia High School is a member of the Louisiana High School Athletic Association and currently competes in classification 4A in a variety of sports, including, football, baseball, softball, basketball, track, girls volleyball, and dance.

=== Championships ===
Football Championships

- (1) LHSAA State Championship: 2014
- (6) Six and eight-man football: 1956, 1958, 1962, 1963, 1964, 1965
