= St. Joseph Academy (New Orleans) =

Location
- 1453 Crescent Street; New Orleans, Louisiana 70116; United States; 30.0136°N 90.0786°W

Information
- Type: Private, All-Girls
- Religious affiliations: Roman Catholic, Sisters of St. Joseph
- Grades: 9–12

St. Joseph Academy was an all-girls private high school in New Orleans, Louisiana, sponsored by the Sisters of St. Joseph.

== History ==
The Sisters of Saint Joseph (CSJ) ran St. Joseph Academy High School and had their main convent on the 2100 block of Ursuline Avenue in New Orleans. The site also included a boarding school for girls. In the late 1950s, the Ursuline Street building was in need of major upgrading to comply with building codes for schools and student housing. Rather than renovate the building, the sisters sold the Ursuline Street building to New Orleans Public Schools and it became an annex of Andrew J. Bell Junior High School. The sisters purchased land at 1453 Crescent Street and opened a new St. Joseph Academy.

After St. Joseph Academy was closed, the property was turned over to another institution for use as another Catholic high school. The new Redeemer High School opened at the 1453 Crescent Street location.
