= KIPP New Orleans Schools =

Charter school operator in Louisiana, United States

KIPP New Orleans Schools (KNOS) is the division of KIPP Schools active in the New Orleans metropolitan area.

By 2016 it became the charter school operator with the largest number of schools in New Orleans. Greg Larose of The Times Picayune wrote that KIPP New Orleans is "in many ways the symbol of the revolution", referring to the educational reforms in New Orleans that occurred post-Hurricane Katrina (2005). In 2019 Della Haselle of the same publication described KIPP New Orleans as "one of the city's oldest and biggest charter school operators".

In 2015 New Orleans established KIPP Through College, a program for students who attended KIPP schools.

== Student performance ==
As of 2016, 61% of the newly graduated students of KIPP New Orleans went on to attend tertiary educational institutions or enter the United States Armed Forces.

== Schools ==
High schools

- Frederick A. Douglass High School
- John F. Kennedy High School (effective fall 2020)
- Booker T. Washington High School

K-8

- KIPP Believe - Formed in 2019 by the merger of KIPP Believe Primary (KBP) and KIPP Believe College Prep (KBCP). It occupies a 42-classroom, 88,000-square-foot (8,200 m^{2}) building near Gentilly with a capacity of 756 students; it was built for $23.5 million. In 2018 it had 680 students.
  - KIPP Believe was scheduled to go into the Benjamin Banneker Elementary School building in 2014. In 2015 bats were discovered in the Banneker building, so KIPP Believe temporarily moved to the former Our Lady of the Rosary School. KIPP Believe College Prep was to be at the Dunbar School for a period before moving to the McNair School.
- KIPP Leadership - Includes KIPP Leadership Primary and KIPP Leadership Academy.
- KIPP Morial - Includes KIPP Morial Primary and KIPP Morial Middle.

5-8

- KIPP Central City Academy - Established in 2007.

PreK-5

- KIPP Central City Primary - Established in 2008.
- KIPP East - New Orleans East - Opened in 2015.
