= Morganza High School =

High school in Morganza, Louisiana, U.S.

Coordinates: 30.7318°N 91.5907°W

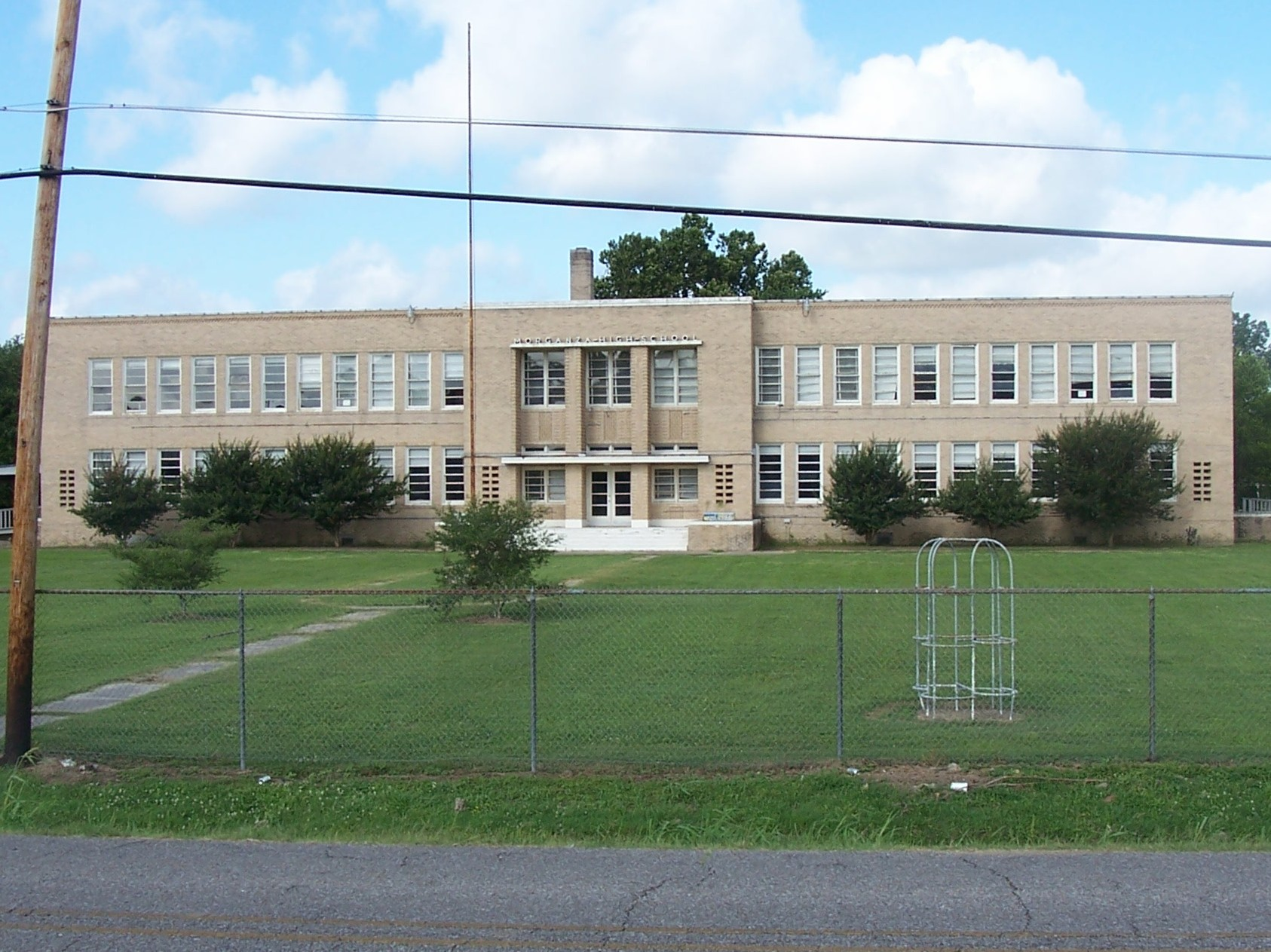
Former Morganza High School building

Morganza High School was a high school located at 752 South Louisiana Highway 3050 in the village of Morganza, Louisiana.

The school buildings and grounds are currently used as a law enforcement training facility for the Pointe Coupee Parish Sheriff's Office. As part of a community project, the school's gymnasium was renovated in 2014 and is currently used as a community athletic facility, as well as a parish athletic hall of fame museum.

== History ==
The school was established in 1906 as a three-room school building. The two-story building last used as Morganza High School was built in 1940. The high school closed in the early 1980s. The school's mascot was the Tigers. Morganza High School's football team won a state championship in 1955 while playing as part of a six-man football scheme. The former high school building later became home to Morganza Elementary which was administered by the Pointe Coupee Parish School Board until being closed in 2008.

John B. Fournet, later a supporter of Huey Pierce Long, Jr., Speaker of the Louisiana House of Representatives, lieutenant governor, and associate and Chief Justice of the Louisiana Supreme Court, was the principal of Morganza High School in the 1916–1917 academic year.
