= West Livingston High School =

Defunct high school in Louisiana, United States

Location
- Rodeo Drive; Denham Springs, Louisiana; United States; 30.4799°N 90.9526°W

Information
- Closed: 1969

West Livingston High School is a former Louisiana public high school which served Black residents of Livingston Parish during segregation. The school was located in the city of Denham Springs. West Livingston High School was consolidated with Denham Springs High School following desegregation. It was one of two high schools to serve Black populations of Livingston Parish.
