= Miller-McCoy Academy =

Secondary school in Louisiana, United States

Coordinates: 30°01′24″N 90°00′11″W

Information
- Established: 2008
- Closed: 2015
- Grades: 5-12
- Gender: Boys

Miller-McCoy Academy for Mathematics and Business (MMA) was an all-boys' charter secondary school in New Orleans East, New Orleans, Louisiana. Miller-McCoy, at the time the only public all boys' school in New Orleans, was named after scientists Kelly Miller and Elijah McCoy. The school was modeled after St. Augustine High School, an all boys' Catholic school.

It served grades 5-12.

== History ==
The school, cofounded by Tiffany Hardrick and Keith Sanders, opened in 2008. It was intended to promote business, technology, and mathematics.

After being accused of ethics violations and cheating among students, the co-founders left the school in 2012. The school did not have a permanent principal until Eric Greely Sr. became the principal in the summer of 2013. Andrea Thomas-Reynolds was the chief executive of the board of directors of McCoy-Miller until January 2014; that month she was replaced by Walter Strong.

As of August 2014 Greely had left his position, citing a lack of control over the hiring of employees and curriculum. Charles Layman Jr., a former teacher at McDonogh 35 High School and a principal in other New Orleans schools, became the interim principal. Layman resigned in December 2015.

In November 2014 Patrick Dobard, the superintendent of the Recovery School District, stated that Miller-McCoy was on track to fail requirements for having its charter renewed. On the same day a 9th grade student stated in a Louisiana Board of Elementary and Secondary Education meeting that a lot of violence and chaos occurred at Miller-McCoy.

In December 2014 the school's board of directors announced that it was closing the school. The school closed in May 2015.

== Campus ==
The school was located on temporary buildings on the site of Livingston High School at 7301 Dwyer Road, in proximity to Mayo Boulevard. Miller-McCoy was intended to move into the actual newly-rebuilt Livingston school building during the 2015–2016 school year.

== Student body ==
Miller-McCoy around 2012 had 560 students, but by 2013 enrollment fell to 325. At that time the entire 12th grade (senior) student body was fewer than 30. By August 2015 there were about 375 students.

== Academic performance ==
From 2012 to circa 2013/2014 8th grade English and science scores declined. As of 2014 the high school examination passing scores overall were 32 points under the New Orleans city average. In October 2014 the school received an "F" grade from the Louisiana state education authorities.

== School uniforms ==
Boys wore school uniforms with blazers; they were intended to provide a private college preparatory school image.

== Extracurricular activities ==
Danielle Dreilinger of The Times Picayune stated that the Miller-McCoy American football team and marching band were "well-regarded".

== See also ==
- List of former high schools in New Orleans
