= Ashland High School (Louisiana) =

High school in Louisiana, United States

Coordinates: 32.1345°N 93.0974°W

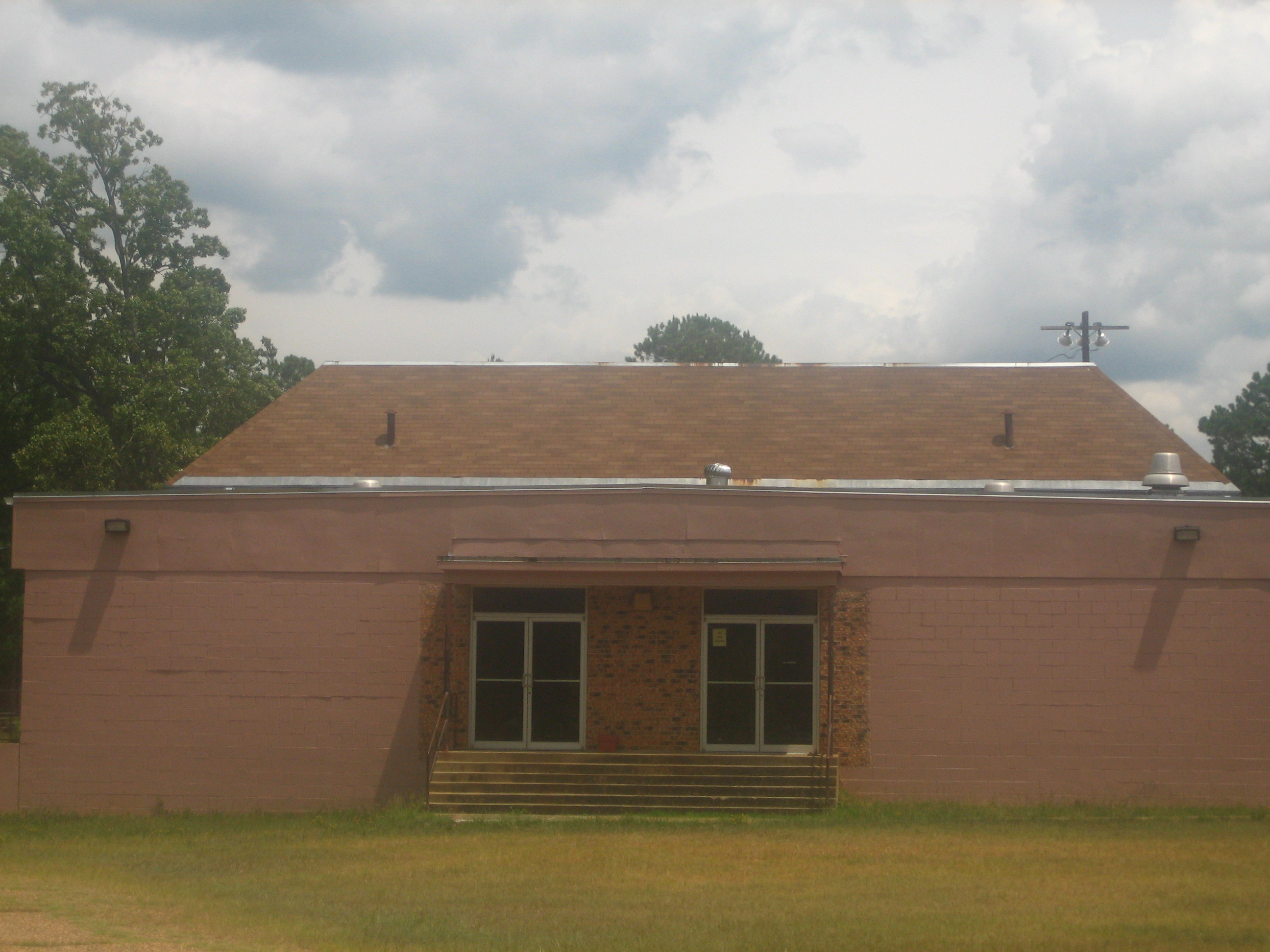
The former Ashland High School gymnasium was converted into the Ashland Community Center, but the structure was destroyed by fire in the summer of 2009.

Ashland High School was a rural public kindergarten-grade 12 primary and secondary school located in the Ashland, Natchitoches Parish, Louisiana from 1907 until its closing in 1981.

Ashland children now go to school in Goldonna, Louisiana and Campti, Louisiana.
