= Pointe Coupee Central High School =

Location
- 8434 Morganza Hwy; Morganza, Louisiana; United States; 30°43′3″N 91°32′15″W

Information
- Type: Public School (1991–2008) Charter School (2008 – 2014) Closed 2014
- Established: 1991
- Principal: Nia Mitchell
- Grades: 6–12
- Enrollment: 330
- Colors: Red, Black, & White
- Mascot: Cougars

Pointe Coupee Central High School was a public high school located in the Labarre area of unincorporated Pointe Coupee Parish, Louisiana, United States, on Louisiana Highway 1.

== History ==
Pointe Coupee Central opened in the 1991–92 school year. It was intended to be the only public high school in Pointe Coupee Parish, with all high school students to attend this school. Due to geographical, and political reasons, Livonia High School was not merged. Students who had previously attended Upper Pointe Coupee High School, Rosenwald High School, and Rougon High School were sent to this new combined high school starting in 1991.

In 2008 the school left the Pointe Coupee Parish School Board and became a charter school operated by Advance Baton Rouge. The school was later under the direct operation of the state Recovery School District.

In 2011, the school's Air Force Junior Reserve Officer Training Corps (AFJROTC) unit was transferred to nearby Livonia High School.

The school was closed down by the parish school board after the 2013-2014 school year. The school's student body was moved to Livonia High School starting with the 2014-2015 school year.

The school's campus was repurposed to house the new STEM Magnet Academy of Pointe Coupee beginning with the 2016-2017 school year.

== Athletics ==
Pointe Coupee Central High School was a member of the Louisiana High School Athletic Association and competed in a variety of sports as a member of the Class Single A division. These sports included football, baseball, softball, basketball, track. The school's first football coach was NFL quarterback and Super Bowl XXII MVP, Doug Williams. The final Head basketball coach was former Pointe Coupee Central and Northwestern State standout Jamieon "Toby" St. Cyr. Head Football and Baseball coach was Cleotha Johnigan Jr. Girls Varsity basketball and volleyball were coached by Wendy Carnes.
