= Sojourner Truth Academy =

Location
- New Orleans, Louisiana; United States of America
- 29.9350°N 90.1035°W

Information
- Type: Charter school
- Motto: "Each One Teach One"
- Established: 2008
- Founder: Channa Mae Cook and Kristin L. Moody
- Principal: Channa Mae Cook
- Faculty: about 40
- Grades: 9-12
- Enrollment: about 300
- Campus: inner city
- Color: Burgundy/Black
- Athletics: Basketball, track
- Mascot: Jaguars

Sojourner Truth Academy was a charter school located in Uptown New Orleans, Louisiana, along Napoleon Avenue. The Recovery School District (RSD) oversaw the operations of the school until its closure in 2012. The school was named after Sojourner Truth.

== History ==
The school was co-founded by two women: Channa Mae Cook, who was 27 when the school began operations, and Kristin Leigh Moody. Both women had decided to start the school after visiting New Orleans in April 2007. In June of that year they moved to New Orleans to begin work on the school. In October they traveled to Baton Rouge to have the Charter School Application for the Board of Elementary and Secondary Education (BESE) approved. The document containing the charter proposal was 200 pages long. After the approval, the women worked to found the school. It opened on Monday August 18, 2008, with the mission of preparing students for university and for promoting social justice. The school started out with a $1.3 million budget. It had 120 students, 8 teachers, one dean of students, one social worker, and a few miscellaneous employees. The school began with only the 9th grade, and added one grade level each year.

In the summer of 2011, the school board hired Reginald Flenory to replace Cook as the school's principal. Marika Barto, the former assistant principal, said in 2012 that "[t]hings went downhill very fast. (Students) now have no custodians, no toilet paper in the bathrooms, no soap. Students are kind of running around the building." Andrew Vanacore of the Times Picayune said that several teachers, anonymous for fear that they would be fired if their identities were public, said that "the transition has not gone well, and that the social mission the school has been sidelined."

In 2011, as the state reviewed which schools would have their charters renewed, the RSD told the school that it would not recommend renewal for Sojourner Truth Academy. The school announced that it would voluntarily forfeit its charter and close in May 2012. In its history, the school had one senior class. George Saucier, an area resident said, as paraphrased by Scott Satchfield of WWLTV in 2012 that the school had "a serious lack of control over its students" and that he was not surprised that a fight had occurred outside of the school in May 2012.

== Campus ==
In its original location, the school shared a building with the Federal Head Start and the Orleans Parish Juvenile Court, with the latter sharing the same hallway space as the school. To direct their students to the proper locations, staff members stood in the hallway when classes changed. As of 2011 it was housed in leased space in a building owned by the Roman Catholic Archdiocese of New Orleans.

== Student body ==
In 2008 the school had 120 students.

== Operations ==
The school hours were from 7:30 to 5:00 every weekday. Students were required to perform community service, and eat in a group breakfast on a daily basis.

== Academic performance ==
In 2010 the school performance score was 53.5 of 200, with 65 being the highest "failing" score. In 2011 the score was 48.7. The score indicates that, in the state examinations, fewer than 30% of Sojourner Truth Academy students scored at grade level or above. As of the latest test by 2012, 60% of the students failed the state geometry examination, and for each of the other subjects, about 30% failed. In every one of the subjects in the state examinations, no more than 25% of the students scored "Good" or "Excellent."
