= Upper Pointe Coupee High School =

High school in Louisiana, United States

Location
- 30.8392°N 91.6664°W

Information
- Former name: Batchelor High School
- Established: 1958
- Closed: 1991

Upper Pointe Coupee High School (at an earlier point Batchelor High School) was a public school located in the community of Batchelor in unincorporated Pointe Coupee Parish, Louisiana, United States. It was a part of the Pointe Coupee Parish School Board.

== History ==
The school opened in 1958 as Batchelor High School with almost an entirely African-American student enrollment. When the Pointe Coupee Parish school system was integrated in 1969, Batchelor High School was partnered with the all white Innis High School. As part of this partnership, students were bused back and forth between the two campuses to participate in different courses. In 1980, this partnership ended with Innis High becoming an elementary school and Batchelor High being renamed Upper Pointe Coupee High. It was a high school in the Pointe Coupee Parish Public School system until after the 1990–91 school year, when the high school was closed down as part of a plan to combine all parish public schools into the newly formed Pointe Coupee Central High School. The old Upper Pointe Coupee High School building, located at 4739 Louisiana Highway 419, is currently home to Upper Pointe Coupee Elementary School. The school's mascot was the Bulldog.
