= Redeemer-Seton High School =

- 1453 Crescent Drive; New Orleans, Louisiana

Information
- Type: Private, Coeducational
- Religious affiliation: Roman Catholic
- Established: (1937–1980) Redemptorist Boys and Girls High School; (1980-1994) name changed to Redeemer High School in 1980; (1994-2006) Redeemer High merged with Seton Academy
- Closed: 2006 ( final commencement at St. Rita's Church - New Orleans)
- President: Mr. Arthur Schmitt, M.Ed.
- Principal: Mrs. Joan G. Johnson, M.Ed.
- Grades: 9-12
- Language: English
- Fight song: "Up and At Em Team-Mates !"
- Athletics: Football, Baseball, Track
- Mascot: RAMS
- Nickname: Redeemer RAMS
- Accreditation: Southern Association of Colleges and Schools
- Tuition: $5,000/year
- Affiliation: originally, the Redemptorist Fathers,(Redemptorist High School,1937-1980)
- Alumni: RAMS Alumni Association - Redemptorist*Redeemer*Redeemer-Seton
- Website: redeemerseton.org at the Wayback Machine (archive index)

Redeemer-Seton High School was a Catholic high school in New Orleans, Louisiana. It was permanently closed after Hurricane Katrina damaged the campus in September 2005. A formal honorary commencement ceremony was held for Katrina graduates at St. Rita's Church in New Orleans on June 25, 2006.

== History ==
Redeemer-Seton was formed by the merger of two Catholic high schools, Redeemer High School (1980–1994) and Seton Academy (1976–1994). The Redeemer High legacy began as Redemptorist Boys and Girls High School (1937–1980) in the Irish Channel section of New Orleans. As the Redemptorist 1980 class yearbook The Redemptor states, and many living alumni also attest, the name changed to Redeemer High School after the Archdiocese of New Orleans wished to purchase the school. The school had lowered in enrollment, and the Redemptorist Fathers wanted to pull out of their ownership of the school. The new Redeemer High then moved to its last location on 1453 Crescent Street in the Gentilly section of New Orleans. This was the site of the then closed St. Joseph Academy (New Orleans) (all-girls).

Many dedicated alumni of Redemptorist, originally sent their children to the new Redeemer High and eventually, the merged Redeemer-Seton High. True RAM alumni acknowledge the school to be a mosaic of races and cultures. Originally, Redemptorist was predominantly a Caucasian student body, until its later years, when more Black Americans and other minorities enrolled, providing the school with more enrollment revenue and added cultural significance to the RAMS legacy. It became the only racially diverse, co-educational, private Catholic school in the city. Since its Irish Channel years, the school was a co-educational institution. Redemptorist/Redeemer/Redeemer-Seton, was known for its rich history, its lovable and eccentric faculty and student body, and its resilience. This high school was originally located in the Gentilly neighborhood in New Orleans.The school colors were blue and gold.

== Hurricane Katrina ==
The campus suffered extensive flood damage from Hurricane Katrina and was the second-most damaged campus in the city, after Alfred Lawless High School in the Lower 9th Ward.

The Roman Catholic Archdiocese of New Orleans sold the site of Redeemer-Seton to Holy Cross High School, although this plan elicited strong criticism from various groups, including Redeemer-Seton alumni and former Redeemer-Seton faculty members. Holy Cross administrators demolished all buildings on the site to make way for the campus.

Redeemer-Seton shared the site with St. Frances Cabrini Church and St. Frances Cabrini Elementary. Parishioners in the Cabrini community agreed to allow the Archdiocese to sell the combined Cabrini/Redeemer-Seton site, but architecture preservationists and some members of the Cabrini community argued that the church was an important example of mid-twentieth century architecture and was worthy of preservation and restoration. Opponents to the preservationists argued that the church had extensive damage and was not significant enough to save. Holy Cross administrators argued that they needed the entire site for the high school and could not spare the church. Holy Cross opened in this location at the start of the 2009 school year.
