= Lake Area New Tech Early College High School =

Former school in Louisiana, United States

Location
- 30.0150°N 90.0856°W

Information
- School type: High school
- Established: 2011
- Closed: 2017

Lake Area New Tech Early College High School was a former high school in Gentilly, New Orleans, Louisiana, United States. The New Beginnings Schools Foundation ran the school. The school was established in July 2011 as a result of a merger between Greater Gentilly High School and Thurgood Marshall Early College High School.

The $39 million school building opened in August 2009 as Greater Gentilly High School with capacity for 800 students. It was one of the first built as part of the RSD's $1.8 billion post-Hurricane Katrina facility overhaul.

In December 2017, it was announced that the school was closing and would reopen as John F. Kennedy High School on the same campus starting in July 2018.
