= Rougon High School =

Defunct high school in Louisiana, United States

Coordinates: 30.60944°N 91.37332°W

Rougon High School Building

Rougon High School was a school located at 13258 Louisiana Highway 416 in the town of Rougon, Louisiana. The school's mascot was the Devils. The school was built in 1940 on land donated by the Rougon family. It was originally called Rougon Graded School, and was partly formed from the students of the old Bueche School located in Jarreau, Louisiana. It was a high school in the Pointe Coupee Parish Public School system until after the 1990–91 school year, when the high school was closed down as part of a plan to combine all parish public schools into the newly formed Pointe Coupee Central High School. The school had been somewhat of a powerhouse in track & field in the 1970s and 1980s. The school won LHSAA state championships in track and field in Class C in 1975, 1976, and 1977. It won Class B state championships in 1985, 1986, 1987, and 1988. The old Rougon High School building, which was built in 1940, is currently the home to Rougon Elementary and Jr High School.
