= Poydras High School =

- U.S. National Register of Historic Places
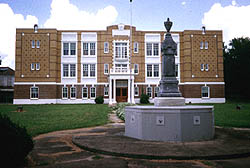

- Location within Louisiana Location within the United States
- Location: 460 W. Main St., New Roads, Louisiana
- Coordinates: 30°41′35″N 91°26′14.5″W
- Area: 1.6 acres (0.65 ha)
- Built: 1924
- Architect: Burk, William R.; Burkes & Haley
- Architectural style: Classical Revival
- NRHP reference No.: 96000229
- Added to NRHP: March 7, 1996

Poydras High School was a school located on Louisiana Highway 1 in the city of New Roads, Louisiana, United States. The building formerly housing the school now houses the local historical society.

== History ==
The school's mascot was the Bulldog.

The school came into existence, in the early 19th century, in the form of several public schools in the parish known as "Poydras Schools". They were so named for Julien Poydras, a local planter, statesman, literary figure, and philanthropist, who contributed financially to their creation. At the time, these were the only public schools in Louisiana. These early public schools have caused some academics to refer to Pointe Coupee Parish as "the cradle of Louisiana public education." In 1809, Governor Claiborne wrote "In the Parish of Pointe Coupee provisions have been made for the support of two or more schools, but the other parishes do not seem dissuaded to imitate so worthy an example". In 1811, these public "Poydras Schools" began receiving public funds. In 1829, Poydras founded the first endowed Louisiana college when he bequeathed money for the establishment of a school in New Roads. The school was called Poydras College, and was located three and a half miles south west of New Roads, along False River. In 1861, the song "Maryland, My Maryland" was written by James Ryder Randall, who was at the time employed as an English professor at Poydras College. The college closed in 1861 with the coming of the American Civil War. It reopened in 1873 as Poydras Academy, a Catholic girls' school.

In 1923, due to financial issues, Poydras Academy was taken over by the Pointe Coupee Parish School Board. The school was renamed Poydras High School, and in 1924, a new building was constructed with funds bequeathed to the parish by Julien Poydras. This Poydras High School building is located at 460 W. Main Street, in downtown New Roads. It was a high school in the Pointe Coupee Parish Public School system until after the 1980–81 school year, when the high school was closed. This closure left Rosenwald High School as the only public high school in New Roads until it was converted to an elementary school in 1991.

After being closed as a high school, the old high school building continued in use as home to Poydras Elementary School until the early 1990s. The building is now the Julien Poydras Museum and Cultural Center, owned by the Pointe Coupée Historical Society. The old building houses office spaces as well as banquet rooms that are available to be rented. The front lawn includes the grave of Julien Poydras as well as a monument in his honor.
