= Frederick A. Douglass High School (New Orleans) =

Public charter high school in New Orleans, Louisiana, United States

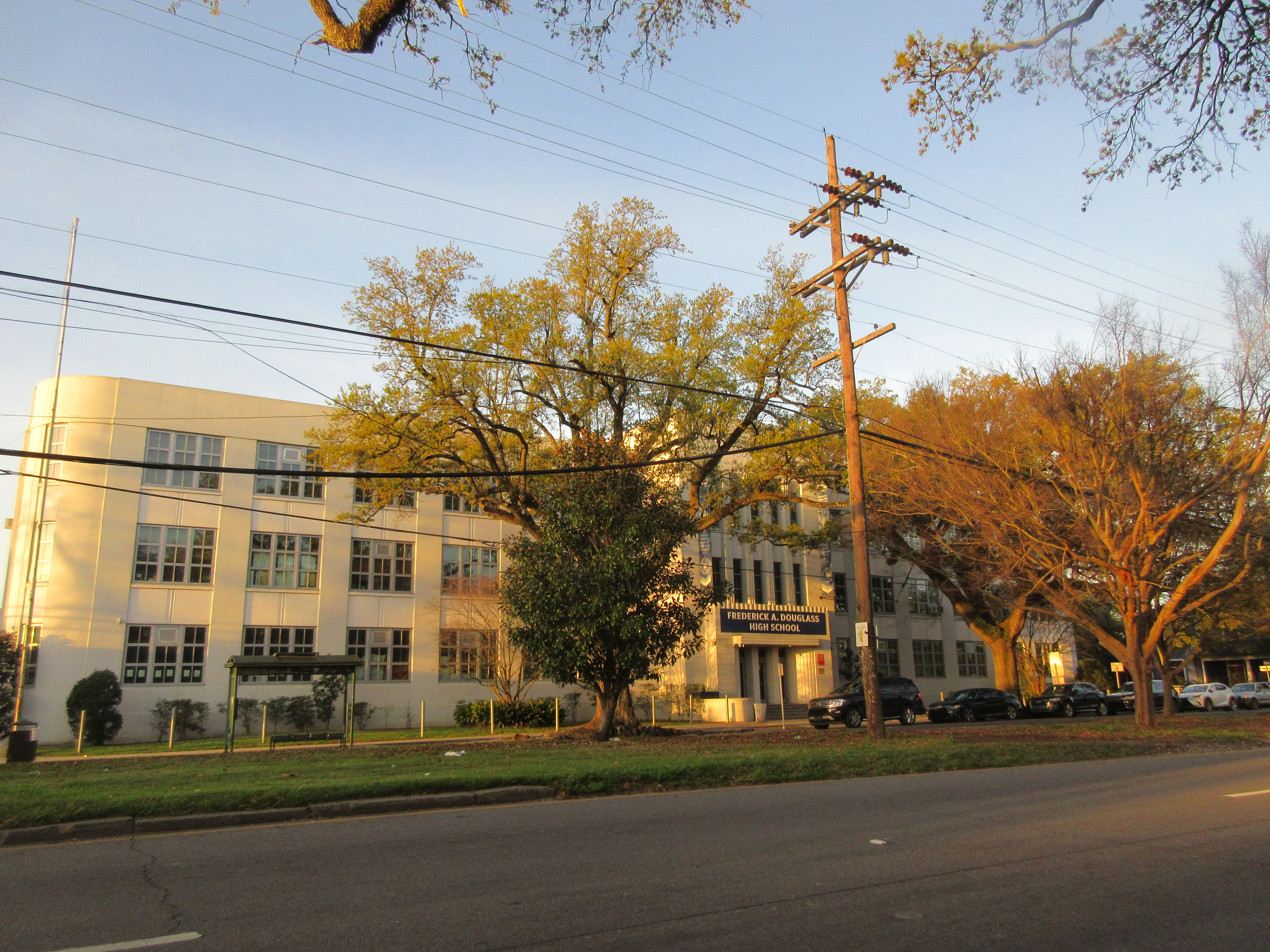

Location
- 3820 Saint Claude Avenue; New Orleans, (Orleans Parish), Louisiana 70117; United States
- Coordinates: 29.965875°N 90.036836°W

Information
- Type: Public high school
- Established: 1921; 105 years ago
- Director: Towana Pierre-Floyd
- Staff: 45.00 (FTE)
- Grades: 9-13
- Enrollment: 658 (2024-25)
- Student to teacher ratio: 14.62
- Colors: Navy, gray, and white
- Nickname: Bobcats
- Website: Frederick A. Douglass High School

Frederick A. Douglass High School is a public high school in New Orleans, Louisiana named for Frederick A. Douglass. It is under the authority of the Orleans Parish School Board and is a part of KIPP New Orleans.

It was located in the 9th Ward.

Its original name was Francis T. Nicholls High School, named for Francis T. Nicholls, and it opened in 1913 for White students only. A new building opened in the 1930s.

In 1967, African-American students during the Civil Rights movement attempted to become students. It racially integrated, and in the 1990s it was renamed after Frederick Douglass.

From 2010 to 2014 KIPP Renaissance School replaced the institution of Douglass High School in its building. The KIPP Renaissance School was renamed for Douglass.
