= Thurgood Marshall Early College High School =

Former school in Louisiana, United States

Information
- Closed: 2011 (merged with Greater Gentilly High School to form Lake Area New Tech Early College High School)
- School district: Recovery School District
- NCES District ID: 2200054

Thurgood Marshall Early College High School was a high school in Gentilly, New Orleans, Louisiana, United States. The Recovery School District (RSD) and UNO New Beginnings Schools Foundation were the administers of the school.

In May 2010, the first senior class graduates from Thurgood Marshall Early College HS. In July 2011, the school merged with Greater Gentilly High School to become Lake Area New Tech Early College High School.

== Pierre Capdau Early College High School ==
In August 2006, the University of New Orleans launched Pierre Capdau Early College High School. In December 2008, the Louisiana Board of Elementary and Secondary Education (BESE) granted UNO a Type 5 Charter to operate Thurgood Marshall Early College High School for the 2009–10 school year closing Pierre Capdau Early College High.
