= Joseph S. Clark Sr. High School =

Defunct high school in Louisiana, United States

Coordinates: 29.9696°N 90.0704°W

Joseph S. Clark Sr. High School was a high school in Tremé, New Orleans, Louisiana.

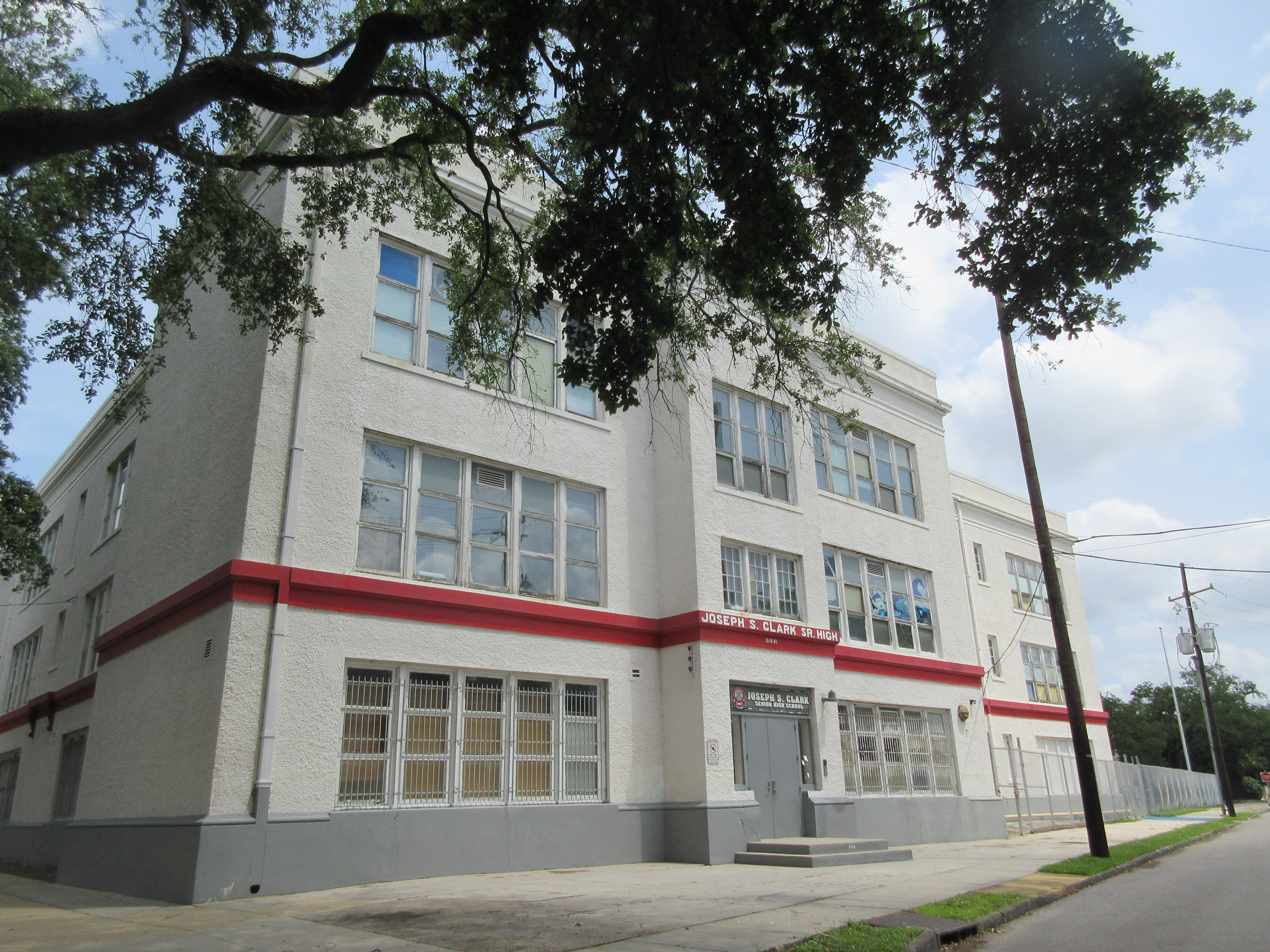
Joseph S Clark school building on Derbigny Street, New Orleans, in 2024

Clark opened in 1947 as the first high school below Canal Street to educate colored children in New Orleans. It was named after Joseph S. Clark, the first president of the Southern University at Baton Rouge. The Rebirth Brass Band was formed at the high school in 1983. The high school was operated by the charter Firstline Schools at its closing in 2019.

== Notable alumni ==
- Anthony Bean, Founder/Director of the Anthony Bean Community Theater and Acting School
- Keith Frazier, musician
- Shirley & Lee, musical duo
- Oretha Castle Haley, civil rights activist
- Michael Haynes, football player
- Derrick Lewis, football player
- Fred Luter, former president of the Southern Baptist Convention
- Mannie Fresh, rapper, record producer and DJ
- Mia X, rapper, singer-songwriter and actress
- Rebirth Brass Band, brass band
- Al Richardson, football defensive end
- Kermit Ruffins, trumpeter
- Jerome Smith, civil rights activist
- Roosevelt "Rosey" Taylor, football all-pro safety
- Oliver Thomas, Democratic politician
- Monk Williams, football player
- Floyd Young, football player
