= Greater Gentilly High School =

Former school in Louisiana, United States

Coordinates: 30.018993°N 90.076011°W

Greater Gentilly High School was a high school in Gentilly, New Orleans, Louisiana, United States. The Recovery School District (RSD) was the administer of the school.

The school opened in August 2009. It moved into a $39 million campus with capacity for 800 students; it was one of the first built as part of the RSD's $1.8 billion post-Hurricane Katrina facility overhaul. As of January 2011 the school had about 250 students. Around that time, the University of New Orleans charter school network launched a takeover attempt. Paul Vallas, CEO of the Recovery School District, argued that the takeover was necessary since the school was so small.

In July 2011, the school merged with Thurgood Marshall Early College High School to become Lake Area New Tech Early College High School.
