= Abramson Science and Technology Charter School =

Former public charter school in New Orleans, US

Coordinates: 30°1′50″N 89°57′55″W

The Abramson Science and Technology Charter School was a charter school in New Orleans, Louisiana. As of 2013, it was directly operated by the Recovery School District (RSD) and was a K-8 school. It previously served grades K-11 and was managed by the Pelican Educational Foundation on behalf of the RSD. It was located on the site of the former Marion Abramson High School in New Orleans East. It is adjacent to the campus of the Sarah T. Reed Elementary School.

== History ==
The school was the first charter school operated by the Pelican Educational Foundation, an organization which was formed in 2005. The foundation had connections with the Gülen Movement. The Pelican Foundation began operating the school in 2007. The school opened in 2007 in a set of trailers located on the site where the building of Abramson High School once stood. As of 2011 it was still located in the set of trailers.

Folwell Dunbar, an education official in the State of Louisiana, warned the state about potential issues at the charter school. He argued that the school was "terribly mismanaged" and that the state should revoke the charter. In July 2011 Folwell Dunbar and his boss, Jacob Landry, were fired by the Louisiana State Superintendent of Schools.

In July 2011 the state suddenly closed the school, stating that it will conduct an investigation. This was in light of an investigation by the New Orleans Times-Picayune and allegations of a bribery attempt. Some parents believed that the school would be closed, but the RSD stated that it would remain open. As a result of the allegations of misconduct, by August 2011, the state revoked Pelican's contract shortly before the beginning of the school year. The RSD stated that it would begin directly operating Abramson until it could find another charter operator.

In January 2012 a student at the school was arrested on the suspicion that he brought a weapon to the school. In May 2012 police were summoned to the school to break up fights. An RSD administrator said that she was unaware of any weapons that may have been used.

== Academics ==
The school curriculum specializes in sciences and mathematics. As of 2011 the school promoted how many of its students performed well in science fairs.

In 2010 the school had a state school performance score of 78. Andrew Vanacore of The Times Picayune said that compared to the former Abramson High School, The new Abramson, part of a revolutionary post-storm movement toward independent charter schools, was able to produce vastly improved results." The previous Abramson High School had a performance score of 31.2 in 2005. The school closed in 2017.

== Faculty and staff ==
Abramson Charter, after its opening, accepted many Teach for America recruits, as did other charter schools that opened after Hurricane Katrina hit the city in 2005.

== See also ==
- Kenilworth Science and Technology Charter School - The other Pelican Foundation school, in Baton Rouge, Louisiana
