= Ashland, Natchitoches Parish, Louisiana =

Ashland, Louisiana
- Village
- Village of Ashland
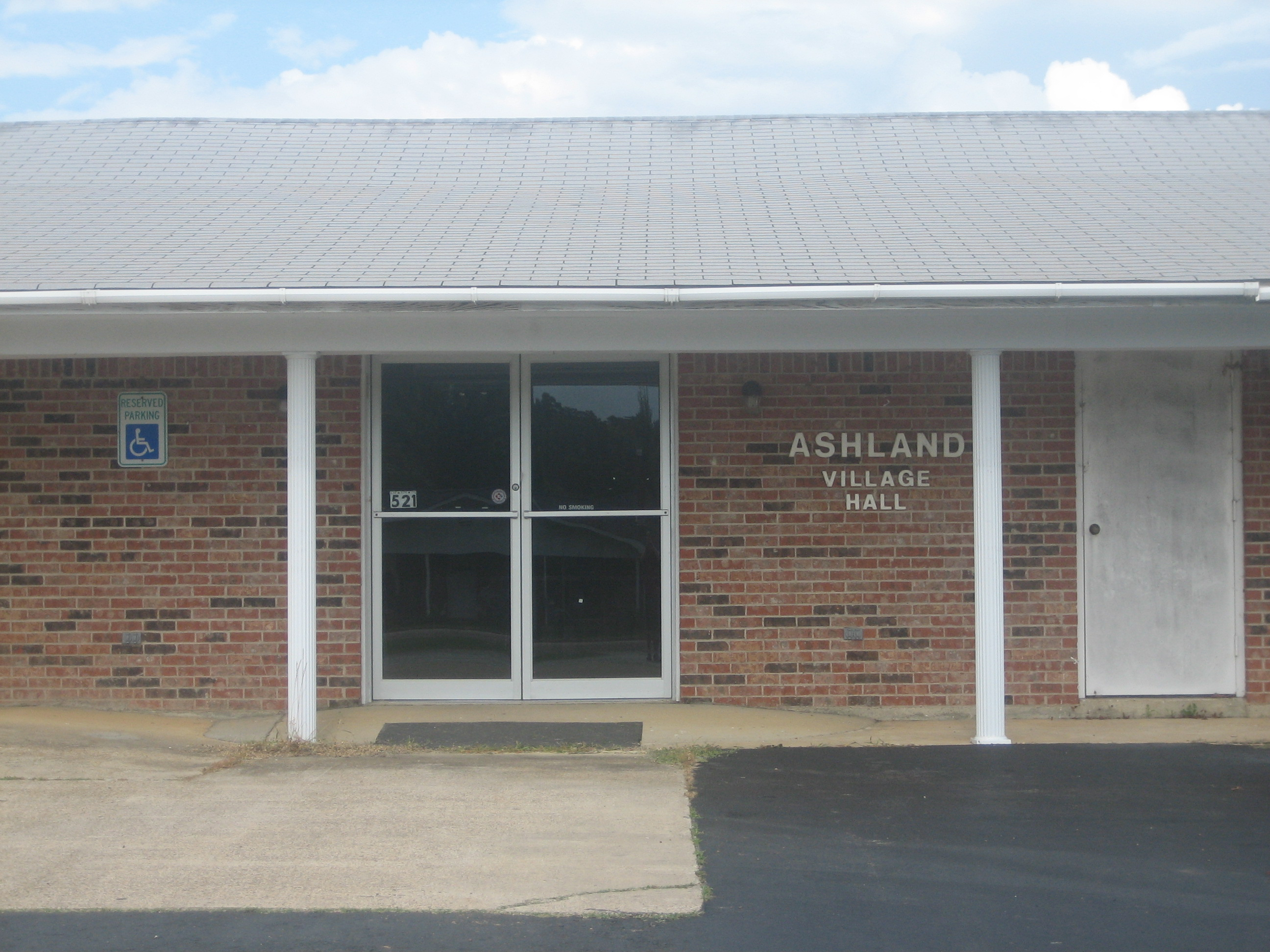
- Ashland Village Hall is located next to the United States Post Office building

- Location of Ashland in Natchitoches Parish, Louisiana.
- Coordinates: 32°06′59″N 93°06′53″W
- Country: United States
- State: Louisiana
- Parish: Natchitoches
- Incorporated: 1963

Government
  - Mayor: Terry Chesser (R)
  - Aldermen: Josh Adams (R); Ann Anderson (R); James Cherry

Area
  - Total: 27.15 sq mi (70.31 km^{2})
  - Land: 26.99 sq mi (69.90 km^{2})
  - Water: 0.16 sq mi (0.42 km^{2})
  - Rank: NC: 1st LA: 11th
- Elevation: 226 ft (69 m)

Population (2020)
  - Total: 194
  - Rank: NC: 7th
  - Density: 7.2/sq mi (2.78/km^{2})
- Time zone: UTC−6 (CST)
  - Summer (DST): UTC−5 (CDT)
- Area code: 318
- FIPS code: 22-03145
- GNIS feature ID: 2407410

Ashland is a village in the northernmost portion of Natchitoches Parish, Louisiana, United States. A few residences and a convenience store to the north spill over into neighboring Bienville Parish. The population was 291 at the 2000 census but declined nine percent to 269 in 2010. The median age was 45.7 years. Ashland is part of the Natchitoches Micropolitan Statistical Area.

== Geography ==
According to the United States Census Bureau, the village has a total area of 27.1 square miles (70 km^{2}), of which 27.1 square miles (70 km^{2}) is land and 0.04 square miles (0.10 km^{2}) (0.07%) is water.

=== Climate ===
Climate is characterized by relatively high temperatures and evenly distributed precipitation throughout the year. According to the Köppen Climate Classification system, Ashland has a humid subtropical climate, abbreviated "Cfa" on climate maps.

Climate data for Ashland, Louisiana (1991–2020 normals, extremes 1954–2014)
Month	Jan	Feb	Mar	Apr	May	Jun	Jul	Aug	Sep	Oct	Nov	Dec	Year
Record high °F (°C)	82 (28)	87 (31)	89 (32)	92 (33)	97 (36)	103 (39)	107 (42)	108 (42)	110 (43)	97 (36)	90 (32)	84 (29)	110 (43)
Mean daily maximum °F (°C)	57.7 (14.3)	61.9 (16.6)	69.2 (20.7)	76.1 (24.5)	82.6 (28.1)	89.2 (31.8)	92.0 (33.3)	93.0 (33.9)	88.0 (31.1)	78.3 (25.7)	68.3 (20.2)	59.4 (15.2)	76.3 (24.6)
Daily mean °F (°C)	45.9 (7.7)	49.7 (9.8)	57.0 (13.9)	63.7 (17.6)	71.6 (22.0)	78.3 (25.7)	81.3 (27.4)	81.2 (27.3)	75.7 (24.3)	65.0 (18.3)	55.2 (12.9)	47.8 (8.8)	64.4 (18.0)
Mean daily minimum °F (°C)	34.2 (1.2)	37.5 (3.1)	44.7 (7.1)	51.3 (10.7)	60.7 (15.9)	67.4 (19.7)	70.5 (21.4)	69.5 (20.8)	63.4 (17.4)	51.7 (10.9)	42.1 (5.6)	36.1 (2.3)	52.4 (11.3)
Record low °F (°C)	−5 (−21)	10 (−12)	11 (−12)	24 (−4)	32 (0)	45 (7)	53 (12)	48 (9)	34 (1)	24 (−4)	14 (−10)	2 (−17)	−5 (−21)
Average precipitation inches (mm)	5.38 (137)	5.24 (133)	5.56 (141)	5.25 (133)	4.63 (118)	4.00 (102)	3.81 (97)	3.18 (81)	3.92 (100)	4.56 (116)	4.99 (127)	6.18 (157)	56.70 (1,440)
Average snowfall inches (cm)	0.1 (0.25)	0.3 (0.76)	0.0 (0.0)	0.0 (0.0)	0.0 (0.0)	0.0 (0.0)	0.0 (0.0)	0.0 (0.0)	0.0 (0.0)	0.0 (0.0)	0.0 (0.0)	0.1 (0.25)	0.5 (1.3)
Average precipitation days (≥ 0.01 in)	8.8	8.2	8.4	6.7	6.7	7.2	7.7	6.2	6.2	6.6	7.3	8.3	88.3
Average snowy days (≥ 0.1 in)	0.1	0.1	0.0	0.0	0.0	0.0	0.0	0.0	0.0	0.0	0.0	0.2	0.4
Source: NOAA

== Demographics ==
Historical population
Census	Pop.	Note	%±
1970	211		—
1980	289		37.0%
1990	289		0.0%
2000	291		0.7%
2010	269		−7.6%
2020	194		−27.9%
2025 (est.)	188	▼	−3.1%
U.S. Decennial Census

=== 2020 census ===
Ashland racial composition
Race	Number	Percentage
White (non-Hispanic)	161	82.99%
Black or African American (non-Hispanic)	22	11.34%
Native American	2	1.03%
Other/Mixed	3	1.55%
Hispanic or Latino	6	3.09%

As of the 2020 United States census, there were 194 people, 77 households, and 57 families residing in the village.

=== 2000 census ===
As of the census of 2000, there were 291 people, 121 households, and 87 families residing in the village. The population density was 10.7 inhabitants per square mile (4.1/km^{2}). There were 149 housing units at an average density of 5.5 per square mile (2.1/km^{2}). The racial makeup of the village was 86.60% White, 10.31% African American, 2.41% Native American and 0.69% Asian. Hispanic or Latino of any race were 1.72% of the population.

There were 121 households, out of which 27.3% had children under the age of 18 living with them, 57.0% were married couples living together, 14.9% had a female householder with no husband present, and 27.3% were non-families. 25.6% of all households were made up of individuals, and 15.7% had someone living alone who was 65 years of age or older. The average household size was 2.40 and the average family size was 2.88.

In the village, the population was spread out, with 21.3% under the age of 18, 8.2% from 18 to 24, 26.5% from 25 to 44, 24.7% from 45 to 64, and 19.2% who were 65 years of age or older. The median age was 40 years. For every 100 females, there were 98.0 males. For every 100 females age 18 and over, there were 86.2 males.

The median income for a household in the village was $23,438, and the median income for a family was $31,875. Males had a median income of $27,083 versus $23,750 for females. The per capita income for the village was $12,652. About 33.7% of families and 32.0% of the population were below the poverty line, including 38.1% of those under the age of eighteen and 30.4% of those 65 or over.

== Government ==
The Ashland mayor is Republican Terry Chesser, whose current term expires on December 31, 2026. Nathan Cherry, a Democrat, is a member of the town council, alongside James Lovell, whose party is not listed. Their terms also expire in 2026.

== See also ==
- Old Ashland High School
