= Innis High School =

School in Louisiana, United States

Coordinates: 30.8764°N 91.6792°W

1951 Innis High School football team.

Innis High School was a high school located in the village of Innis in Pointe Coupee Parish, Louisiana, United States, at 6450 Louisiana Highway 1. The school, originally called Innis Consolidated School, was established in 1906 on 3 acres (12,000 m^{2}) of land donated by the Innis family. It received accreditation in 1928. The school's mascot was the Red Raiders. In 1969, the all-white Innis High was partnered with Batchelor High School as part of a racial integration plan in Pointe Coupee Parish. As part of this partnership, students were bused back and forth between the two campuses to participate in different courses. In 1980, this partnership ended with Innis High becoming an elementary school and Batchelor High being renamed Upper Pointe Coupee High School.

With the elementary school closed, the school buildings are currently being used as a sub-station for the Pointe Coupee Parish Sheriff's Office.
