= Marion Abramson High School =

Former school in New Orleans, Louisiana

Coordinates: 30°1′49″N 89°57′59″W

Marion Abramson Senior High was a high school in the New Orleans East area of New Orleans, United States. The former Abramson campus is adjacent to Greater St. Stephen Baptist Church. The school was operated by New Orleans Public Schools.

It was named after Marion Pfeifer Abramson (August 29, 1905 – November 30, 1965), the creator of the educational television station WYES-TV.

== History ==
In 2002 it was the largest high school in New Orleans. As of that year it was opening an academy for first year students (freshmen). The 9th graders were clustered on the first floor in two hallways. The school organized teams of 9th grade students named after Kwanzaa groups. In addition, Abramson had career academies in culinary arts and travel and tourism.

In the pre-Hurricane Katrina period, several years before 2010, The Times-Picayune published an anecdote stating that students at Abramson did not use their school bathrooms due to the poor conditions and instead traveled to a Taco Bell between classes in order to use the bathrooms there. The final year of operation of Abramson High was 2005.

=== Hurricane Katrina and closure ===
As Hurricane Katrina was about to hit land, the New Orleans Regional Transit Authority (RTA) designated Abramson as a place where people could receive transportation to the Louisiana Superdome, a shelter of last resort.

According to an article in ESPN, in 2005, during Hurricane Katrina, the school gymnasium was being used as an assembly point for New Orleans evacuees, and that some evacuees died when flood waters from the levee failure disaster entered the gymnasium. A journalist from Libération, a newspaper in France, was told that 1,200 people drowned at Abramson High. Gary Younge of The Guardian said "Nobody at the Federal Emergency Management Agency or the New Orleans police force has been able to verify that." Gwen Filosa and Trymaine Lee of The Times-Picayune stated "Contradicting rumors that hundreds of evacuees poured into the school for shelter, only to meet a watery grave, a stroll through the school on Monday revealed no corpses." The levee failure disaster destroyed the school facility. Filosa and Lee said "Abramson High, like much of the east, was a swampy mess filled with sludge — and eerie remnants of daily life before the hurricane."

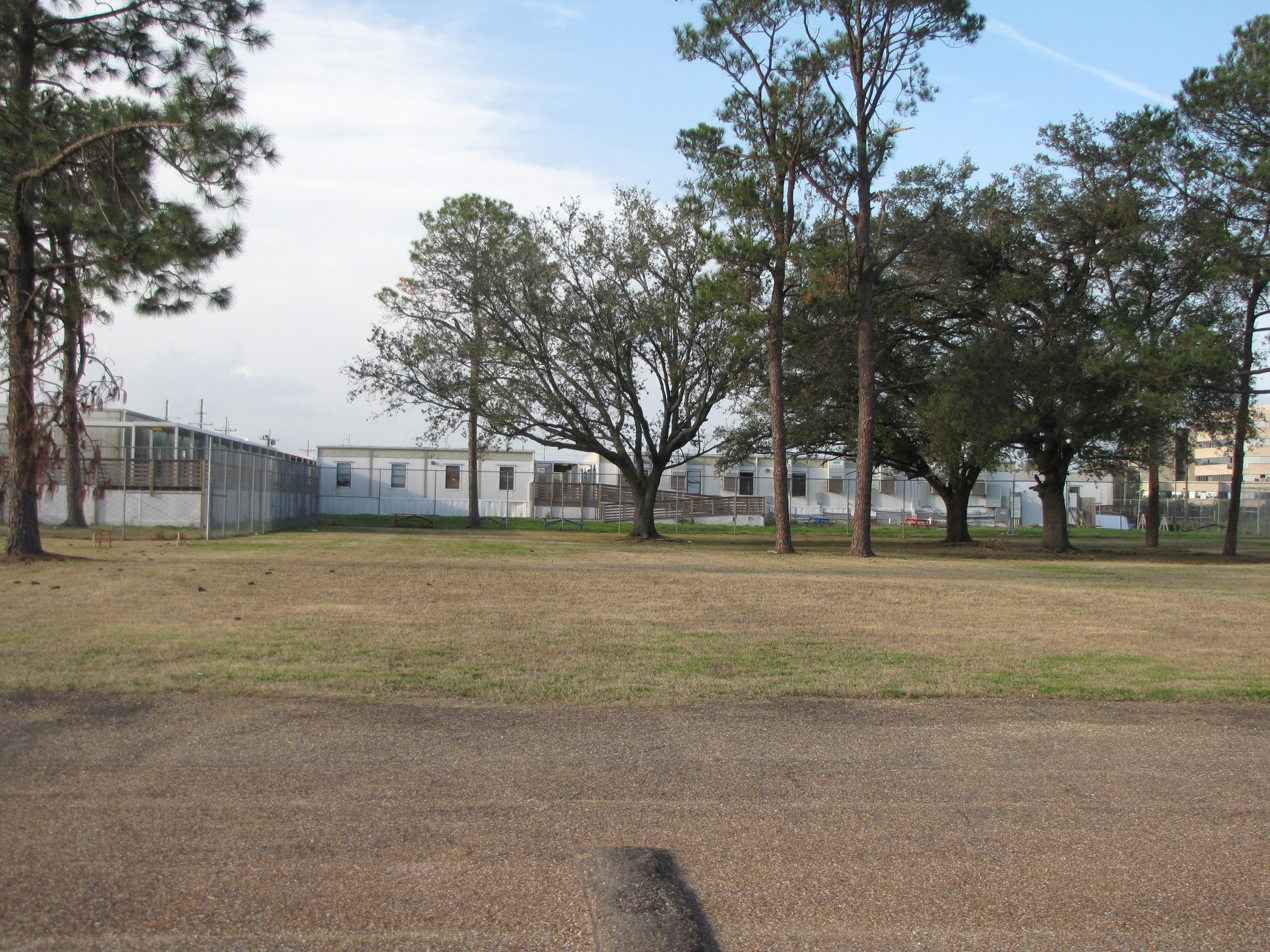
Abramson Science and Technology School under construction on the site of the former Marion Abramson High School.

The Abramson Science and Technology School opened on the property of the former Marion Abramson High School. The new charter school opened in a set of trailers on the site of the former Abramson building. In 2010 Sci Academy (New Orleans Charter Science and Math Academy) moved to a group of modular buildings at the Abramson site from another group of modular buildings

== Academics ==
In 2005, its final year of operation, it had a school performance score of 31.2 from the State of Louisiana. Andrew Vanacore of The Times-Picayune said that a 31.2 was far below what the state considered to be "academically acceptable" and that "Like many high schools before Hurricane Katrina, the old Abramson had struggled academically".

Student publications included the Dispatch school newspaper and the Ship’s Log yearbook.

== Notable alumni ==
- Chelsea Hayes (Track and field athlete)
- Carldell Johnson (Basketball player) – Attended John F. Kennedy High School and transferred to Abramson his senior year.
- Angie Jones (Inventor) – Holder of 27 patents for innovations in software technology. Graduated from Abramson as salutatorian.
- Jacoby Jones (American football player) – Attended St. Augustine High School and transferred to Abramson.
- Freak Nasty (Rapper) – Eriq Henry Timmons spent his high school years at Abramson on the field for track and football. He went on to record the hit, "Da' Dip," and now resides in Atlanta as the founder of Hard Hood Records.
- Ike Taylor (American football player) – Attended Marion Abramson Senior High School in New Orleans where he played multiple positions, including running back, defensive end, and cornerback.
- Lil Wayne (Rapper) – Transferred to Abramson after attending McMain Secondary School for two years.

== Notable faculty ==
- Terrence Jones (English teacher, former college football player)
