= Leonidas, New Orleans =

Leonidas
- New Orleans Neighborhood
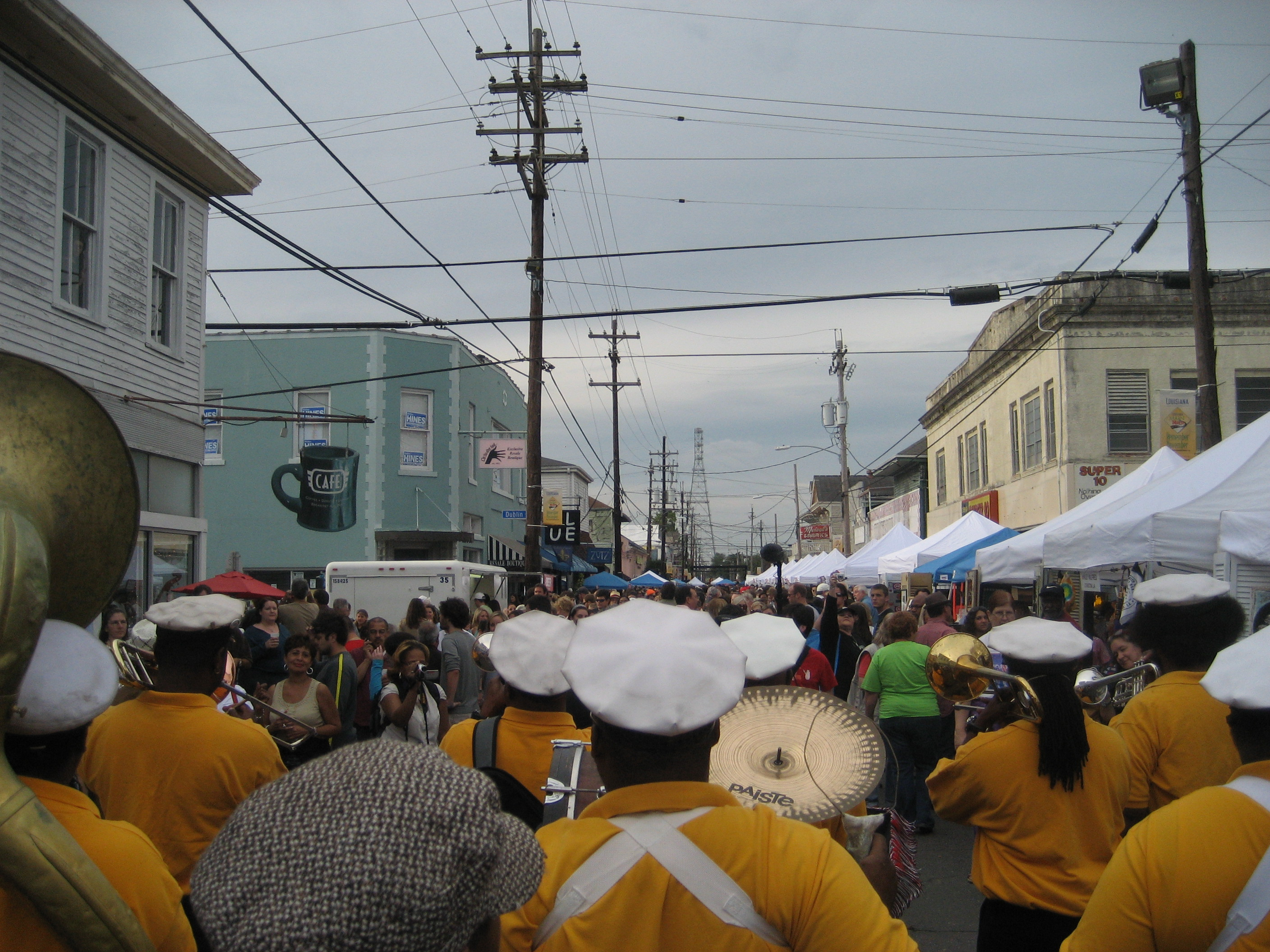
- Second lining down Oak Street during the Po-Boy Festival
- Nicknames: Pigeon Town / Pension Town (a portion of it)
- Interactive map of Leonidas
- Coordinates: 29°57′21″N 90°07′44″W
- Country: United States
- State: Louisiana
- City: New Orleans
- Planning District: District 3, Uptown/Carrollton

Area
  - Total: 1.05 sq mi (2.7 km^{2})
  - Land: 0.92 sq mi (2.4 km^{2})
  - Water: 0.13 sq mi (0.34 km^{2})
- Elevation: 0 ft (0 m)

Population (2010)
  - Total: 3,288
  - Density: 3,600/sq mi (1,400/km^{2})
- Time zone: UTC-6 (CST)
  - Summer (DST): UTC-5 (CDT)
- Area code: 504

Leonidas (also known as West Carrollton) is a neighborhood designation in the city of New Orleans. A subdistrict of the Uptown/Carrollton Area, its boundaries as defined by the New Orleans City Planning Commission are: South Claiborne Avenue, Leonidas and Fig Streets to the north, South Carrollton Avenue to the east, the Mississippi River and Jefferson Parish to the west. Although an official city planning district name, the name "Leonidas" is not widely used nor has it any historical usage and the area is usually referred to by the larger neighborhood "Uptown" or "Carrollton".

The designated neighborhood incorporates the upper-river half of what had been the town of Carrollton, Louisiana, in the 19th century. It is commonly known to locals simply as "Carrollton," or to distinguish this section, "Upper Carrollton" or "West Carrollton".

The portion closer to the river is often called the "Riverbend" or "Carrollton Riverbend." The section closer to the Jefferson Parish line is sometimes known as "Pigeon Town/Pension Town".

Today the area thrives on its commercial businesses, but it also includes a large residential community. Landmarks in the neighborhood include the Camellia Grill, the Carrollton Streetcar Barn, Palmer Park, the Water Works, and the Oak Street commercial district (including the well-known Maple Leaf Bar).

== Name ==
The formal name for the neighborhood, Leonidas, may have been derived from the famous Spartan King of 490 B.C. However, as the name also is connected with the street that intersects the neighborhood, Leonidas Street, it is more likely to have derived from Leonidas Polk, Episcopalian "fighting bishop" for whom the street was possibly renamed following the end of Reconstruction.

The informal name, Pigeon Town, has been passed down through generations. The name has its roots in the word, pidgin. It is defined as a simplified speech used for communication between people with different languages.

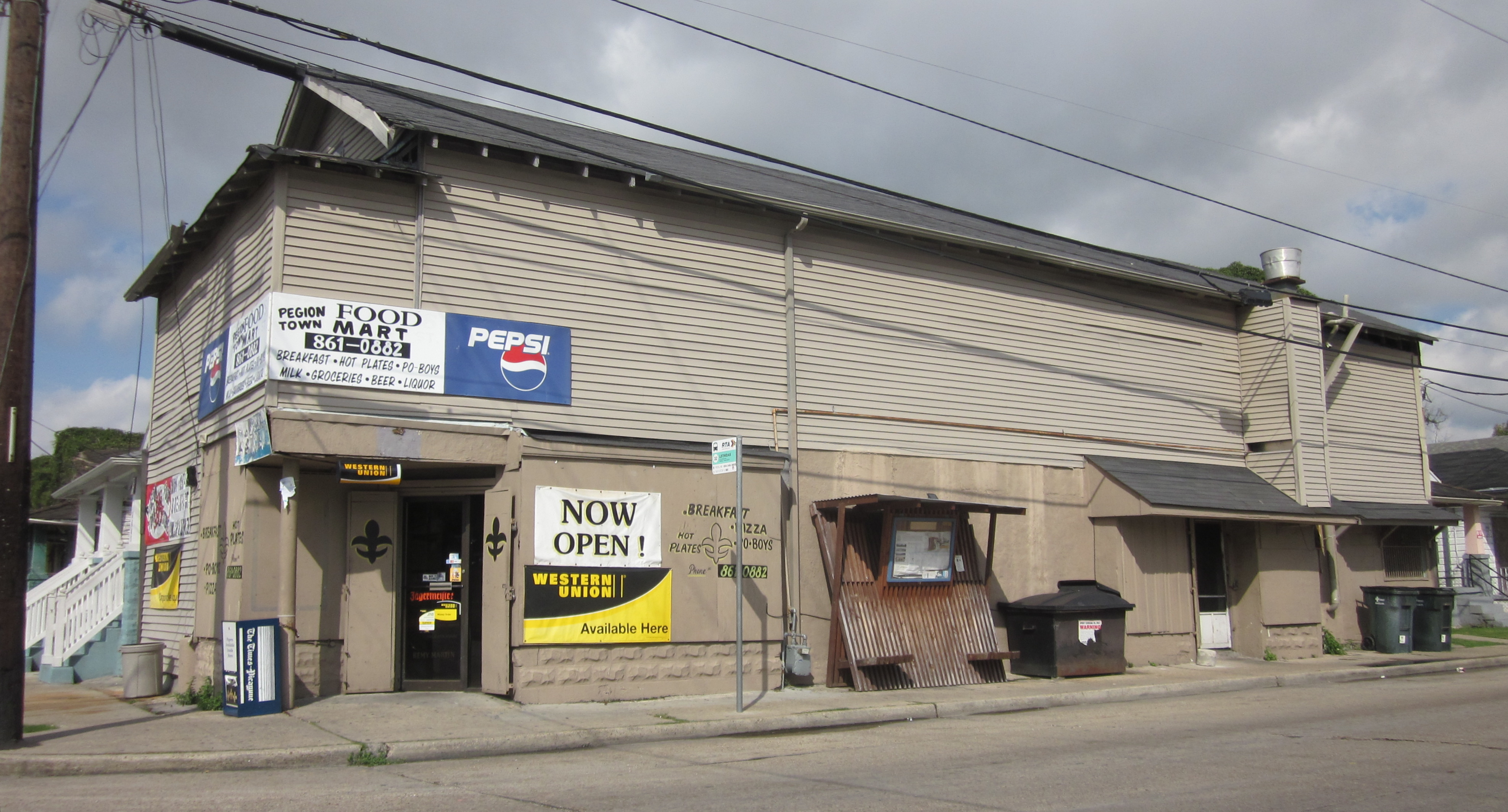
"Pigeon Town Food Market" Leonidas Street

== History ==
The Leonidas neighborhood area has history dating back to the 1700s. Jean-Baptiste Le Moyne de Bienville, a French colonizer and the founder of the city of New Orleans, began a plantation in the area circa 1719. The land went on to remain a plantation for different types of agriculture well into the 1800s. The area was then bought by the New Orleans Canal and Banking Company and was divided into sections. In 1835, the first house was built and soon emerged a new neighborhood of the city of New Orleans. The Leonidas neighborhood was a part of a bigger whole called the town of Carrollton. In the 1850s, Dublin was the main street of the town. Fast forward almost a century and a half later in 1980, the town of Carrollton along with the Leonidas neighborhood was purchased and divided the city into 13 districts and 72 neighborhoods by the New Orleans City Planning Commission.

=== Recent development ===
A part of the Uptown/Carrollton area that escaped serious Katrina-related damage, the Oak Street commercial corridor is staging a comeback from problems that had begun to accumulate well before 2005. Numerous changes in public perceptions, crimes and city services

“Six months of major street repair and utility construction created new pedestrian-friendly amenities along a half-mile of Oak Street…” This project was to rebuild the roadways and make it more accessible. The project also included the fixing of major water lines, drainpipes and sewer lines.

Pigeon Town / Pension Town used to be known as an area of the bullets and the drugs and the fear. There were numerous killings and gunfire reported from the neighborhood. For instance, in the report by Walt Philbin, a man was shot to death with three people wounded in the incident close to the murder scene. The article also mentions numerous bullet casings that litter the surrounding areas in the neighborhood. Perhaps the greatest concern to each individual's life in New Orleans city are an increasing number of street crimes and break-in offenses. Project NOLA is an anti-crime nonprofit organization developed to help keep people in New Orleans area safe by providing public awareness of all dangerous situations happening within the community. The neighborhood of Leonidas in New Orleans is part of a major crime-fighting initiative thanks to several generous donations. The neighborhood has had dozens of HD crime cameras installed.

== Geography ==
Leonidas is located at 29°57′21″N 90°07′44″W and has an elevation of 0 feet (0.0 m). According to the United States Census Bureau, the district has a total area of 1.05 square miles (2.7 km^{2}). 0.92 square miles (2.4 km^{2}) of which is land and 0.13 square miles (0.3 km^{2}) (12.38%) of which is water.

=== Adjacent Neighborhoods ===
- Hollygrove (north)
- Gert Town (north)
- Fontainebleau (east)
- East Carrollton (east)
- Mississippi River (west)
- Jefferson Parish (west)

=== Boundaries ===
The New Orleans City Planning Commission defines the boundaries of Leonidas as these streets: South Claiborne Avenue, Leonidas Street, Fig Street, South Carrollton Avenue, the Mississippi River and Jefferson Parish. A subdistrict of the Uptown/Carrollton Area, its boundaries as defined by the New Orleans City Planning Commission are: South Claiborne Avenue, Leonidas and Fig Streets to the north, South Carrollton Avenue to the east, The Mississippi River and Jefferson Parish to the west. The designated neighborhood incorporates the upper-river half of what had been the town of Carrollton. The portion closer to the river is often called the "Riverbend."

The section closer to the Jefferson Parish line is sometimes known as "Pigeon Town / Pension Town."

== Marsalis Harmony Park (formerly Palmer Park) ==
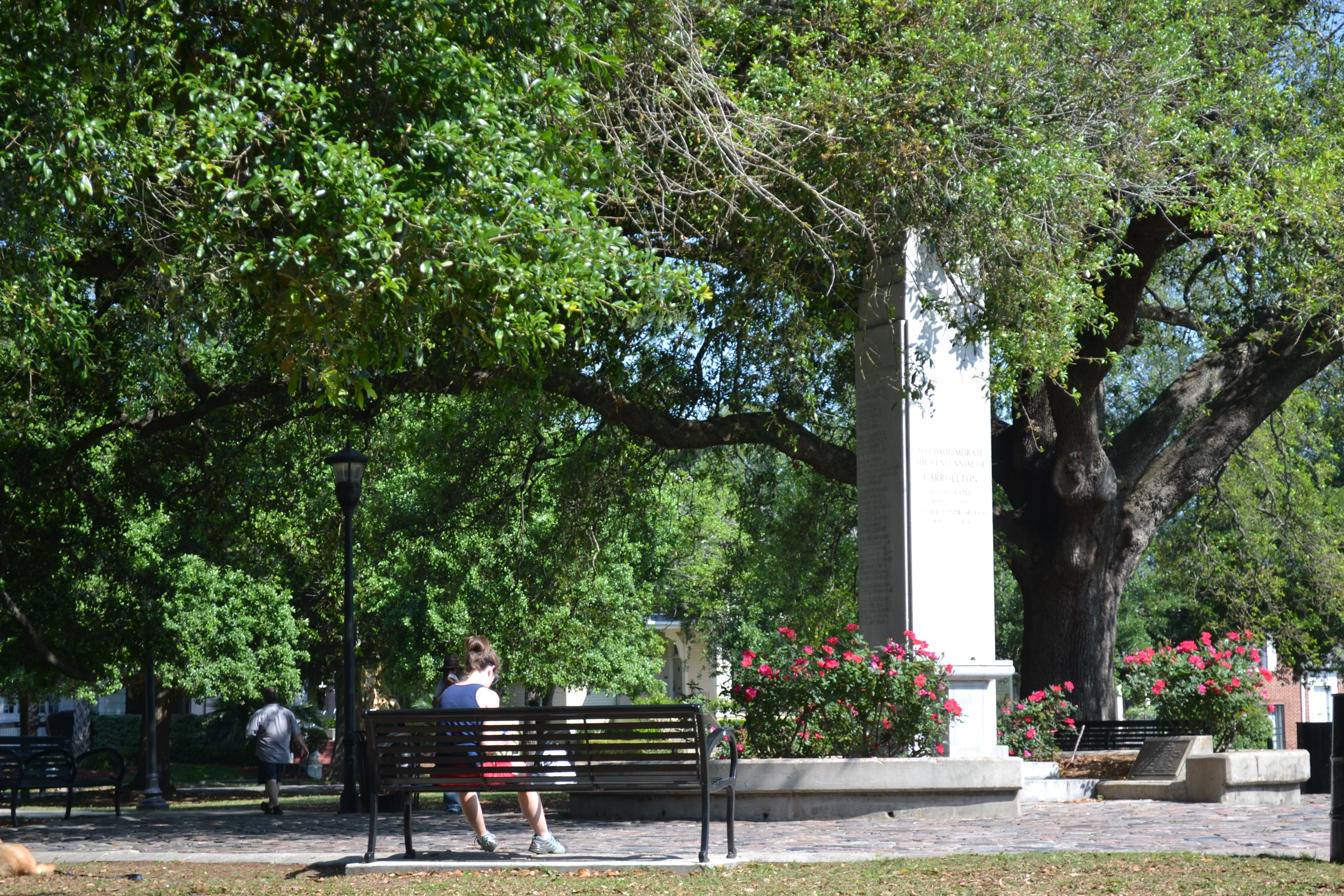
Center part of Marsalis Harmony Park

There are several historical landmarks in Leonidas, many of which have been restored since the destruction due to Hurricane Katrina. One local landmark is Marsalis Harmony Park, which is located at the corner of S. Carrollton Ave. and S. Claiborne Ave. It is a historical landmark, part of the Carrollton Historic District. The park provides space for concerts, home tours, festivals, and filming. The park is more children friendly after the construction of brand-new jungle gym, rock climbing wall, swings, and slides. Each month, usually on the last Saturday of the month, the park holds an event called the Marsalis Harmony Art Market. It is a food, arts, and craft event that showcases local craftsmen, artisans, and provides local New Orleans food.

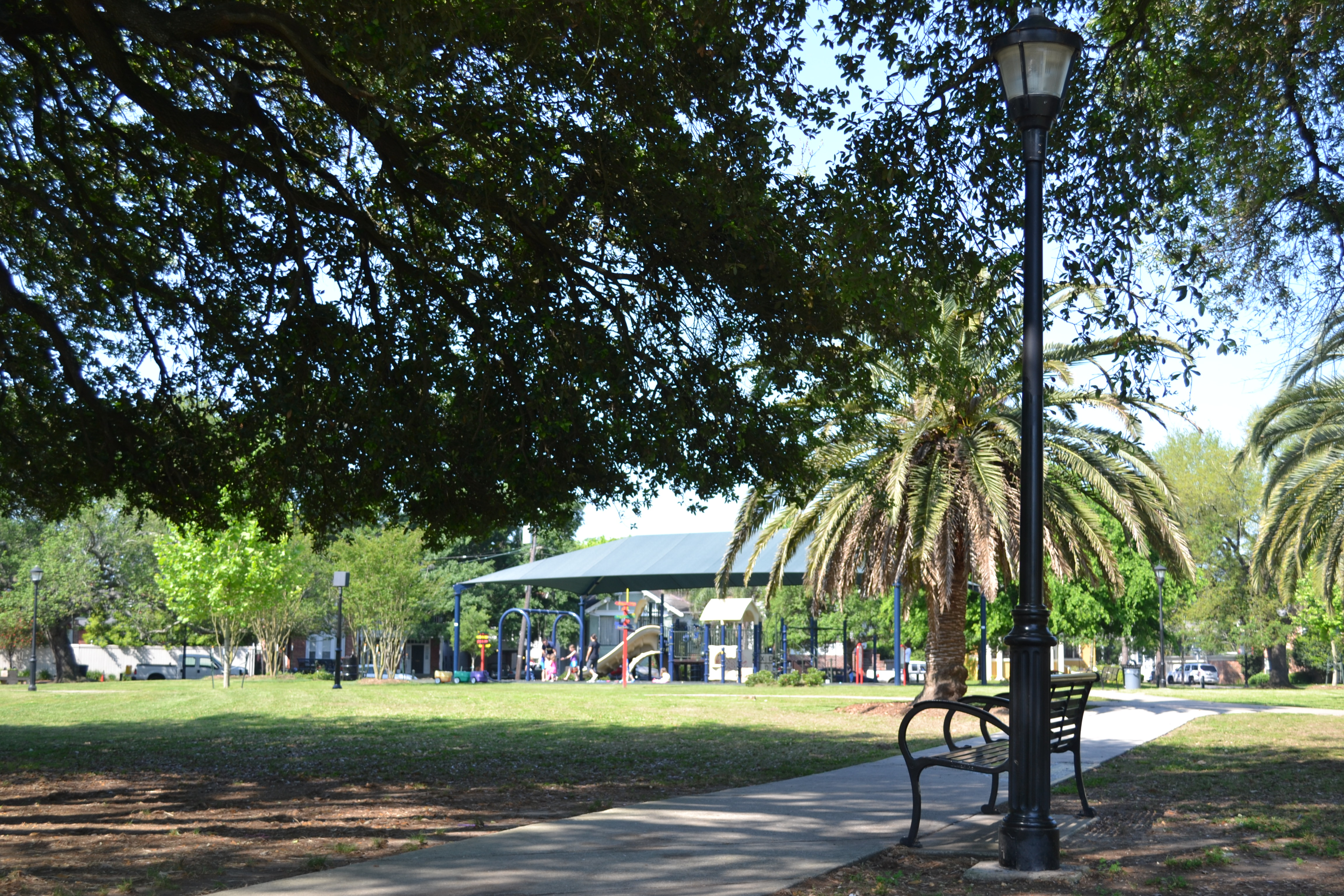
Playground in Marsalis Harmony Park

== Education ==
Leonidas is under the Orleans Parish School Board (OPSB).

Leonidas does not offer as many school choices as does other neighborhoods. There were formerly four main schools in Leonidas. One of the four, Audubon Charter School, has closed down and moved to another spot. The three schools currently located in Leonidas are St. Andrew’s Episcopal School, St. Joan of Arc Roman Catholic School, and James H. Bright / J. W. Johnson Elementary. Most of the schools around this neighborhood have closed for different reasons. Even now there are new schools and forms of education being rebuilt in Leonidas.

- St. Andrew’s Episcopal School - located right out of the Leonidas dividing lines near Oak St. and S. Carrollton Ave. St Andrews Episcopal School PreK through Eighth Grade. St. Andrew’s offer classes from Pre-Kindergarten to Middle School 8th grade. After, they help students in high school placement. Students have been accepted into De La Salle High School, Benjamin Franklin High School, Academy of Sacred Heart, Isidore Newman School, NOCCA, St. Mary’s Dominican High School, and many more.
- St. Joan of Arc Catholic School - Affiliated with Blessed Sacrament-St Joan of Arc Catholic Church located nextdoor, the first Josephite parish in New Orleans (founded by Fr Pierre Oscar Lebeau, namesake of Lebeau, Louisiana).
- James H. Bright/J. W. Johnson Elementary (now Sophie B. Wright)
- The former Alfred C. Priestley Junior High School is in the Pigeon Town area. In 1980, it closed. From 1980 to 1993 it housed offices, and from 1993 to 2005 it was used to store objects. Hurricane Katrina disrupted the latter. In 2015 OPSB sold the building to the charter school Lycée Français de la Nouvelle-Orléans.

== Politics ==
The Leonidas neighborhood is a part of District A in New Orleans. This district consists of seven wards including the Leonidas neighborhood.

The representative for this neighborhood on a city level is the Democrat Susan Guidry. She was elected in 2010 and then re-elected for a second term in 2014 against her four competitors. The issues that she focused on in her race include criminal justice committee chair, economic development and quality of life, and Maple Street bars and businesses. All these issues are important to the Leonidas neighborhood because crime and violence are a big issue in the Leonidas neighborhood. Guidry wants to make the neighborhood safer by eliminating the problem from the source and creating a stronger force to keep the problems from reoccurring.

Its representative in the Louisiana House is Democrat Neil Abramson who was elected in 2007. His term focuses on human trafficking and hurricane recovery. The Louisiana Senate Representative is Republican Conrad Appel who has been in office since 2008. His focus for his term consists of trade based economic development and development in higher education.

The polling place for the Leonidas neighborhood is Audubon Charter which is located 719 S Carrollton Ave. On elections held on Tuesday, Audubon Charter is open from 6am to 8pm. When election are held on Saturday, it is open from 7am to 8pm. In order to vote registration and an ID with a signature is needed. Voters of the Leonidas neighborhood can register at the City Hall which is located at 1300 Perdido Street, Room #1W23 or 225 Morgan Street, Room #105.

== Demographics ==
Demographics chart

The Leonidas neighborhood takes up about 1.054 square miles in the Uptown area of New Orleans. According to the data center that population of the Leonidas neighborhood in 2000 was 8,953. This population decreased in 2010 to 6,769. The drastic population decreased because of Hurricane Katrina.

The demographics of the neighborhood have changed over a ten-year span. Some of these aspects include occupancy and income. In the year of 2000 vacancy was 12% but after the census in 2010 it increased to 25.9%. Income was also affected because of public assistance and average income. People who depended on public assistance income to pay their bills was 6.8% in 2000 and decreased to 0.1% in 2010. This decrease probably occurred from the city having to more funds in rebuilding the city, therefore public assistance funds became scarcer. The average income of the citizens in the Leonidas neighborhood was $44,119 in 2000 and increased to $51,216 in 2010.

Other aspects that were affected demographically over time include population in aspects of race and age. Over the ten-year span the population of whites increased 20.6% to 30.7%. On the other hand, the population of blacks decreased from 75.5% to 62%. Even though the population of blacks in the neighborhood is decreasing the percentages show that there are mostly blacks. The ages of the residents in this neighborhood stayed constant between the two censuses. The only drastic change consisted of the age range from 50-64 changed from 14.5% to 20.7%.

As of the census of 2000, there were 8,953 people, 3,633 households, and 2,051 families residing in the neighborhood. The population density was 9,731 /mi² (3,730 /km^{2}).

As of the census of 2010, there were 6,769 people, 3,001 households, and 1,484 families residing in the neighborhood.

== See also ==
- New Orleans neighborhoods
