= Pigeon Town, New Orleans =

Coordinates: 29.954°N 90.130°W

Pigeon Town is a New Orleans, Louisiana neighborhood located in the 17th Ward of New Orleans and within the larger Carrollton neighborhood, and within the area that the New Orleans city planning commission calls "Leonidas." Pigeon Town is (loosely) bordered by Cambronne St. (East), Claiborne Ave. (north), Oak St. (South) and the Orleans-Jefferson parish line on the west. It is situated directly between the Hollygrove neighborhood and the Oak Street Cultural Arts District.

It is also known as Pension Town. In 2014 Danielle Dreilinger of The Times-Picayune wrote that Pigeon/Pension Town had a lack of retail, "cared-for but worn" housing stock, and "sleepy" streets. She stated that year that the P-Town area "hasn't seemed to benefit from the more prosperous Carrollton Avenue corridor and booming Oak Street restaurant scene just a few blocks away."

== History and name controversy ==
Pigeon Town is part of the larger Carrollton neighborhood which was annexed to the City of New Orleans in 1874. There is comprehensive well-documented information on the history of Carrollton. The smaller Pigeon Town portion of Carrollton is sometimes called Pension Town and there is controversy over which neighborhood name came first and which name is correct. Many local residents use the name Pigeon Town or P-Town, while newcomers may call the neighborhood Pension Town.

== Neighborhood arts and culture ==
The neighborhood is a diverse working class residential neighborhood primarily consisting of musicians and artists. Community members work near their homes, there is a high percentage of home ownership and neighbors chat and dance in the street. The Pigeon Town Steppers Social Aid and Pleasure Club hosts an annual Easter Parade that runs through the heart of Pigeon Town. There are several public art and farm projects in the neighborhood including the Okra Abbey, P-Town Farms, and Willow Wilds. The Oak Street border hosts several annual parties that flow into the neighborhood including the Krewe of OAK Midsummer Mardi Gras Parade and Po' boy Fest. Preferred transportation in the neighborhood is biking, walking and public transportation with the RTA streetcar barn right at the edge of Pigeon Town on Willow Street.

== Education ==
It is within the Orleans Parish School Board (OPSB).

The former Alfred C. Priestley Junior High School is in the Pigeon Town area. In 1980 Priestly Junior High closed. From 1980 to 1993 it housed offices, and from 1993 to 2005 it was used to store objects. Hurricane Katrina disrupted the latter. In 2015 OPSB sold the building to the charter school Lycée Français de la Nouvelle-Orléans.
