= Krewe of OAK =

New Orleans Mardi Gras krewe

The Krewe of OAK is a small neighborhood New Orleans Mardi Gras krewe and parade held in the Carrollton neighborhood of New Orleans, Louisiana. The parade starts and ends on Oak Street, presumably the origin of the name, although members say that OAK stands for "Outrageous And Kinky".

The krewe's Carnival parade is held on the Friday night before Mardi Gras Day. OAK also holds a "Mid Summer Mardi Gras" celebration, usually in August. The Krewe Ball is held at the Maple Leaf Bar, and parades start and end outside that neighborhood landmark.

The Krewe of OAK is an example of neighborhood Carnival celebrations. Since the 1980s it is the only parade still marching in Carrollton during the Carnival season, as the neighborhood's older Krewe, the Krewe of Carrollton, now parades on Saint Charles Avenue and Canal Street, one of the routes which the city government now strongly pressures parades over a certain size to follow.

The parade traditionally features golf cart floats with effigy heads of notable Carrollton characters, including James Booker. Additionally, there are jazz brass bands, dance troupes, and home-made floats and costumes.

The 2005 Krewe of OAK Midsummer Mardi Gras Parade on Saturday night, 27 August 2005, was the last parade held in New Orleans before Hurricane Katrina.

The annual Krewe of OAK Mid-Summer Mardi Gras parade usually takes place on the last weekend of August. But in 2017 the foot parade was held on the second to last weekend of August in order to better coincide with the upcoming solar eclipse.

== Photos of the 2005 OAK parade ==
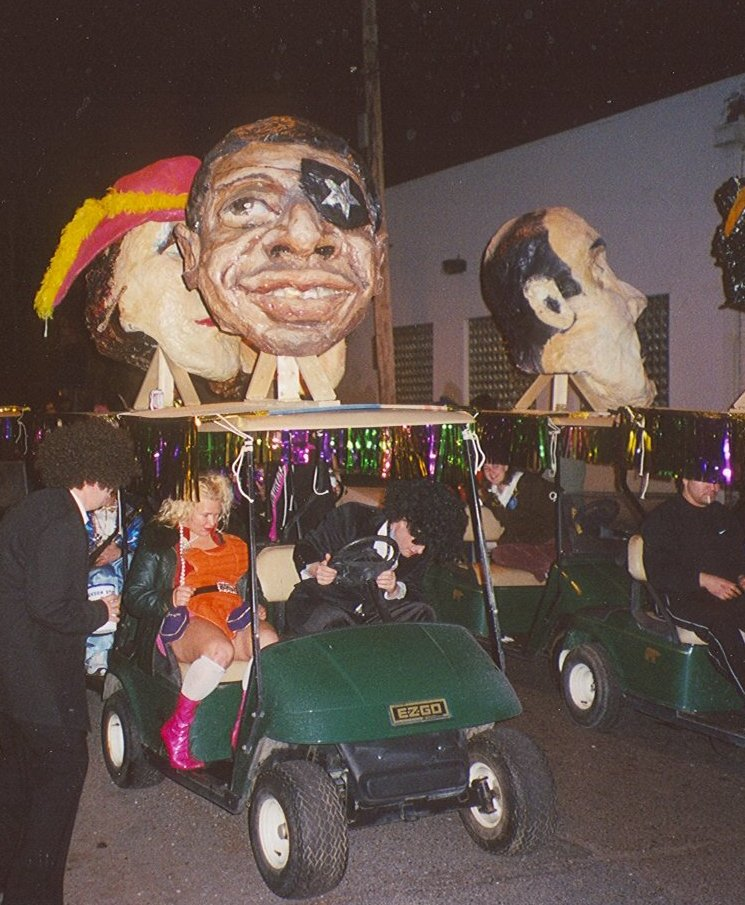
Small floats

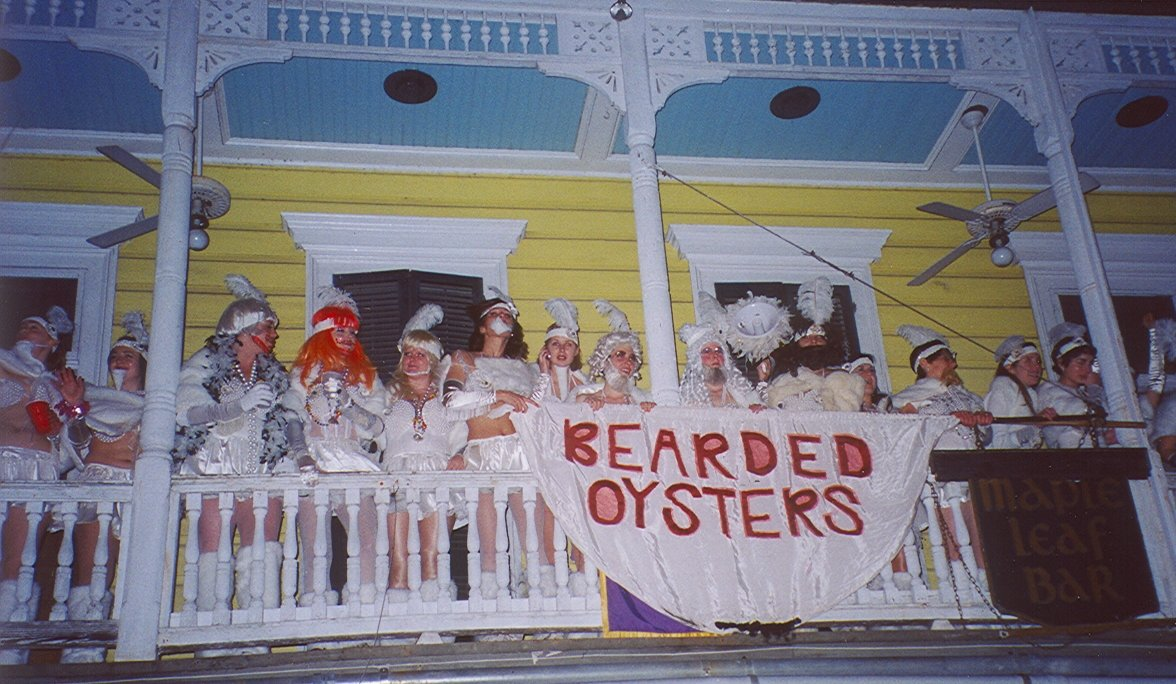
The "Bearded Oysters" dance troupe on a balcony before the start of the parade

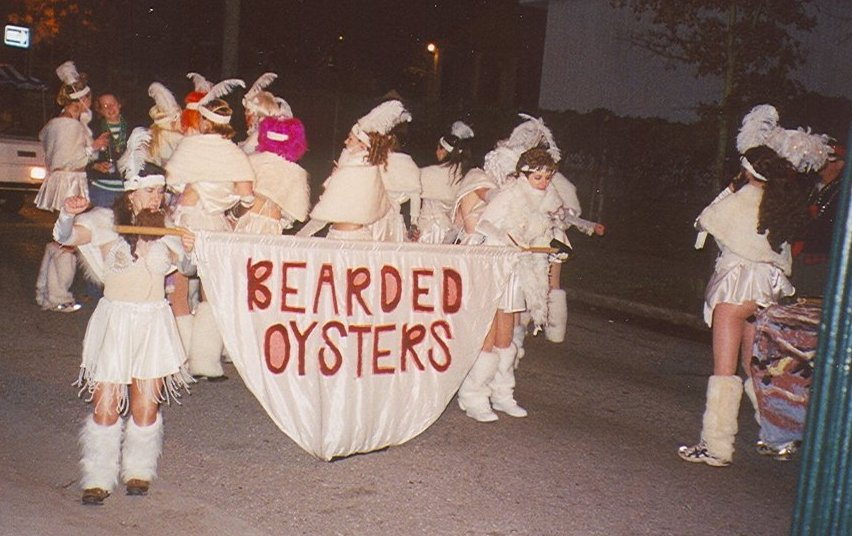
Oysters hit the street

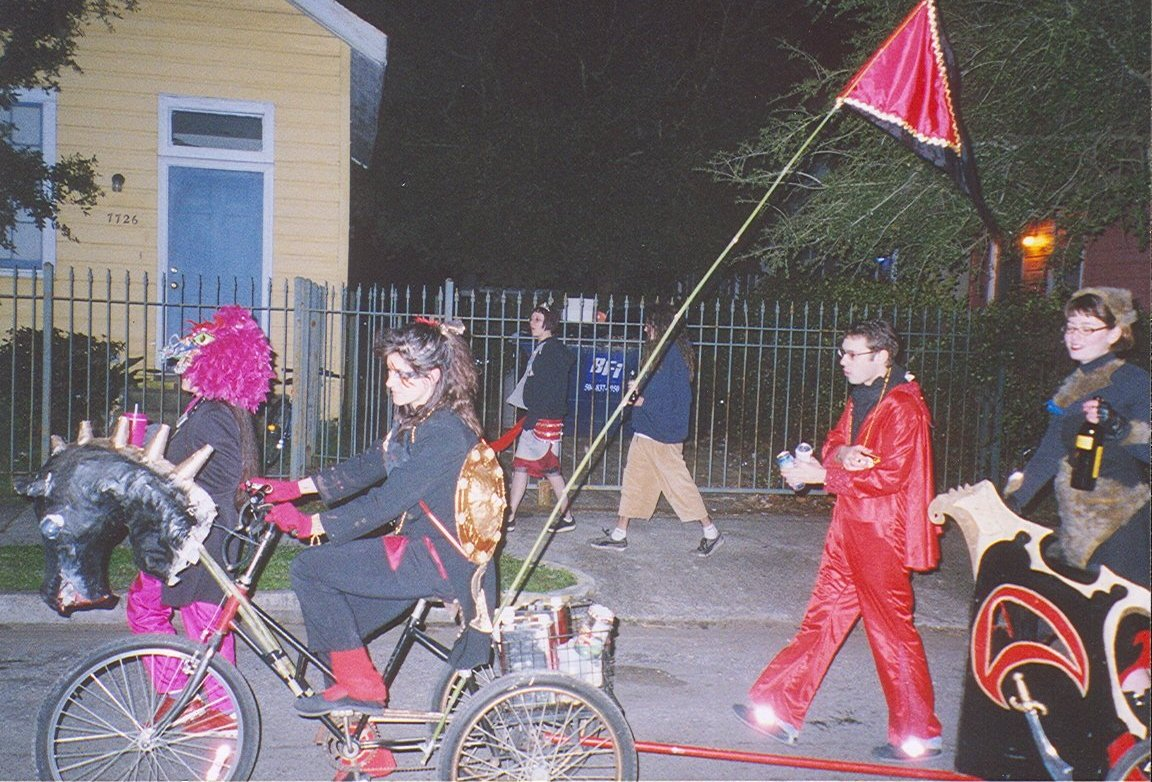
Home-made float of a bicycle pulling a chariot.
