= Julie Kane =

American poet

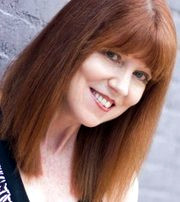
- Born: July 20, 1952 (age 74); Boston
- Education: Cornell University; Boston University; Louisiana State University
- Writing career
- Genre: Poetry
- Literary movement: New Formalist

Julie Kane (born July 20, 1952 in Boston) is a contemporary American poet, scholar, and editor and was the Louisiana Poet Laureate for the 2011–2013 term.

Although born in Massachusetts, Kane has lived in Louisiana for over three decades and writes about the region with the doubled consciousness of a non-native. Her work shows the influence of the Confessional poets; indeed, she was a student in Anne Sexton's graduate poetry seminar at Boston University at the time of Sexton's suicide. She is also associated with the New Formalist movement in contemporary poetry, although she has published free verse as well as formal verse. Her formal poems tend to bend the "rules" of poetic forms and employ slant rhyme.

== Life ==
Kane grew up in Massachusetts, upstate New York, and Montclair, New Jersey, where she graduated from Montclair High School in 1970. Her father, Edwin Julian Kane, was a radio and TV newscaster, and her mother, Nanette Spillane Kane, was a grade school teacher who published a handful of articles and short stories in journals like Redbook and The Christian Science Monitor.

Kane graduated from Cornell University in 1974, where she studied with A. R. Ammons, William Matthews, and Robert Morgan. She won the Mademoiselle Magazine College Poetry Competition, which was judged by Sexton and James Merrill, and went on to study with Sexton at Boston University, where she received her M.A. in Creative Writing. From Boston, Kane moved to Exeter, New Hampshire, as the first woman named to the George Bennett Fellowship in Writing at Phillips Exeter Academy.

In 1976, Kane moved to Baton Rouge, Louisiana, where she began to incorporate her impressions of the unique landscape and culture of the area into her poetry. Taking a job as a technical writer in New Orleans, she became associated with poets who frequented the weekly literary readings held at the Maple Leaf Bar—including Yusef Komunyakaa, Grace Bauer, and Everette Maddox. In 1982, British poet Geoffrey Godbert's Only Poetry Press published a two-woman collection of Kane's and Ruth Adatia's poems, titled Two Into One. In 1987, Kane's first full-length poetry collection, Body and Soul, came out from Pirogue Publishing. In 1991, Greville Press published her chapbook, The Bartender Poems, and she was introduced by Harold Pinter at the Southbank Centre in London.

Kane returned to graduate school at Louisiana State University in 1991. While there, she won the Academy of American Poets Prize and wrote her dissertation on the villanelle under poet Dave Smith. After earning her PhD, she took a position at Northwestern State University, where she was a professor of English and creative writing. She has been a Fulbright Scholar to Vilnius Pedagogical University, and a two-time Writer-in-Residence at Tulane University in New Orleans.

Her work has appeared in The Formalist, The Southern Review, London Magazine, Feminist Studies, Modern Language Quarterly, Twentieth Century Literature, Literature/Film Quarterly, Journal of Consciousness Studies.

Two of her poems have been set to music by composer Libby Larsen and recorded on CDs by the American Boychoir and by mezzo-soprano Susanne Mentzer.

== Awards ==
- Academy of American Poets Prize, judged by Louise Glück
- Lewis P. Simpson Award for her dissertation on the villanelle, directed by poet Dave Smith
- 2002 National Poetry Series for Rhythm & Booze selected by Maxine Kumin
- 2002 Fulbright Scholar at Vilnius Pedagogical University, Lithuania
- 2009 Donald Justice Poetry Prize sponsored by the Iris N. Spencer Poetry Awards

== Works ==
=== Poetry ===
- "Learning Curve (What They Taught Me)"; 'From "Sex Appeal of the Presidents"', poemeleon
- Rosetta. Boston University. 1975.
- Ruth Adatia, Julie Kane (1982). Two Into One. Only Poetry Press. chapbook
- The Bartender Poems. Greville Press. 1991. chapbook
- Body and Soul. New Orleans: Pirogue. 1987. ISBN 978-0-944100-00-4.
- Rhythm & Booze. University of Illinois Press. 2003. ISBN 978-0-252-07140-9.
- Alan Doll Rap, 2005
- Jazz Funeral. Story Line Press. June 1, 2009. ISBN 978-0-9785997-1-3.

=== Editor ===
- Suzanne Disheroon-Green; Lisa Abney; Philip Dubuisson Castille; Barbara C. Ewell; Sarah Gardner; Joe Marshall Hardin; Julie Kane; Pamela Glenn Menke, eds. (2004). Voices of the American South. Pearson/Longman. ISBN 978-0-321-09416-2.
- Grace Bauer; Julie Kane, eds. (2006). Umpteen Ways of Looking at a Possum: Critical and Creative Responses to Everette Maddox. Xavier Review Press. ISBN 978-1-883275-16-7.

=== Memoir ===
- Kiem Do; Julie Kane (1998). Counterpart: A South Vietnamese Naval Officer's War. Naval Institute Press. ISBN 978-1-55750-181-3.

=== Anthologies ===
- Carol Ann Duffy, ed. (1997). "Thirteen". I wouldn't thank you for a valentine: poems for young feminists. Illustrator Trisha Rafferty. Macmillan. ISBN 978-0-8050-5545-0.
