= Boot Camp (film) =

2008 North American film

- Directed by: Christian Duguay
- Written by: John Cox; Agatha Dominik
- Produced by: Chad Oakes; Michael Frislev; Christian Duguay
- Starring: Mila Kunis; Gregory Smith; Peter Stormare; Christopher Jacot; Tygh Runyan; Colleen Rennison; Regine Nehy; Grace Bauer
- Cinematography: Christian Duguay
- Edited by: Sylvain Lebel
- Music by: Normand Corbeil
- Production companies: CD Films; Edgey Productions; Nomadic Pictures
- Distributed by: MGM Home Entertainment
- Release dates: April 18, 2008 (Greece); August 25, 2009 (United States)
- Running time: 95 minutes
- Countries: Canada; United States
- Language: English

Boot Camp, also released in the UK as Punishment, is a 2008 psychological thriller film written by Agatha Dominik and John Cox and directed by Christian Duguay.

The film's working title was Straight Edge and it was shot in Fiji as the first film to use the southwest Pacific Ocean island country's five-year-old incentive program that had been designed to create jobs while building a film production infrastructure. It is about teenagers sent to a rehabilitation camp (in Fiji) who are then abused and brainwashed. The film stars Mila Kunis, Gregory Smith and Peter Stormare. The filming began on October 2, 2006, in Fiji and then continued in Calgary, Alberta, Canada.

The film was released on DVD internationally in 2008 and in the U.S. on August 25, 2009.

== Plot ==
This film is the story of a group of unruly teenagers whose parents send them to rehabilitation boot camp to turn them around. The camp collects each child individually, and then delivers them to the boot camp facility owned by Dr. Arthur Hail, on a remote island in Fiji. There are no walls to stop the teenagers from leaving, but escape is impractical due to the surrounding sea. On arriving at the camp, the teenagers are forced to wear cuffs with sensors around their ankles—if they attempt to escape, security will be alerted.

The main teenagers featured are Sophie, her boyfriend Ben, Danny and Trina. As time passes on the island, Sophie rebels against Dr. Hail and once Ben joins her, the two escape to a nearby island. However, they are recaptured and Ben is told he will be sent home. One morning, while on a run, Logan has the male teenagers go swimming. However, Danny, who can't swim, drowns and Logan tries to get Ben to help cover it up by threatening him with solitary confinement, but Ben refuses.

Meanwhile, Sophie discovers that Logan has raped Trina. When he is put before the camp to admit responsibility for Danny's death, she reveals this to the rest of the teenagers, many of whom also were offered yellow shirts by Logan in exchange for sex. As the teenagers surround Logan, Sophie turns the attention onto Hail, at which point Ben announces to the shocked teenagers that this isn't the first death to occur on a camp run by Dr. Hail.

The teenagers run amok and burn down the entire campsite. In addition, they go after Logan, who dies when his Toyota Land Cruiser crashes into a burning building. At this point, they turn their attention solely to Hail, who tries to shoot them in the hope that he can restore order. However, after finding out his gun wasn't loaded, he is thrown into solitary confinement, to be left for the police to arrest. As the film fades out, we see images of the teenagers celebrating freedom and swimming in the ocean. A message also appears on the screen stating that since the 1970s, when these types of camp were introduced in real life, over 40 deaths have occurred.

== Cast ==
- Mila Kunis as Sophie Bauer
- Gregory Smith as Benjamin "Ben" Richards
- Peter Stormare as Dr. Arthur Hail
- Christopher Jacot as Danny Randall
- Tygh Runyan as Logan
- Colleen Rennison as Ellen Gildner
- Grace Bauer as Danny's Mom
- Daniel Hayes as Marine Madison
- Regine Nehy as Trina Foster
- Alejandro Rae as Jack Wilcox
- Lexie Huber as Marianne Bauer (Sophie's strict mother)
- Serge Bouge as Carl Bauer (Sophie's strict stepfather)

== Reception ==
=== Critical response ===
Choi Jung-in of South Korea's JoongAng Daily wrote, "From the outset, director Christian Duguay makes it clear that Boot Camp is based on true events. ...I loved Duguay's message that children should never be abused under the pretext of parental love."
