= P-town =

P-town, P'town, Ptown, or P/town is a place nickname that may refer to:

== United States ==
- Peoria, Illinois
- Petaluma, California
- Pigeon Town, New Orleans
- Placentia, California
- Pleasanton, California
- Pomona, California
- Portland, Oregon
- Provincetown, Massachusetts
- Puyallup, Washington

== Other places ==
- Pune, Maharashtra, India
- Porirua, New Zealand
- Pretoria, South Africa
