= Lycée Français de la Nouvelle-Orléans =

Information
- Type: Public Charter School
- School district: New Orleans Public Schools
- Grades: PK–12
- Campus type: Urban
- Website: https://www.lfno.org/

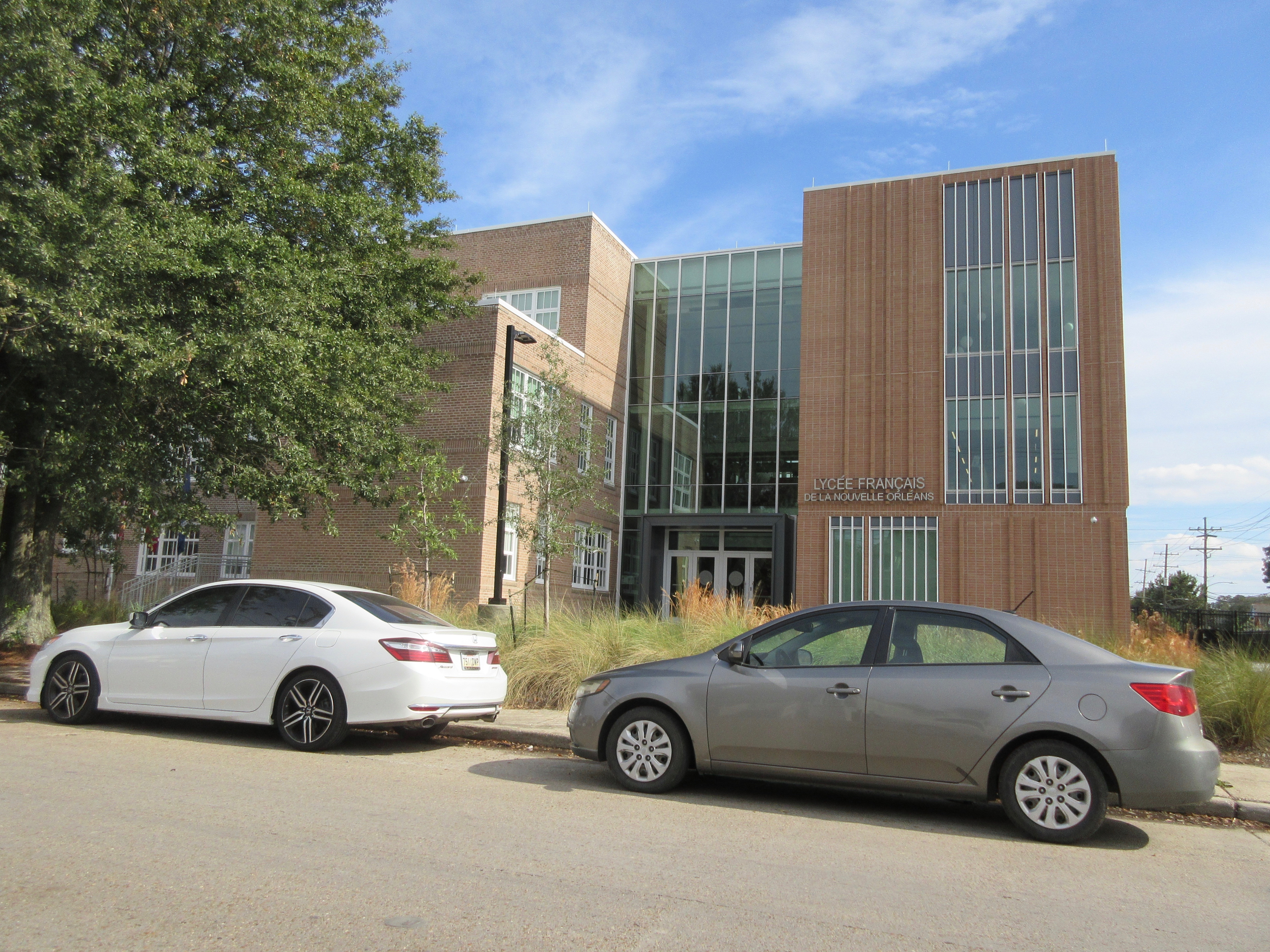
Lycée Français de la Nouvelle-Orléans on Leonidas Street in November 2022

Lycée Français de la Nouvelle-Orléans (LFNO) is a type II charter school, and French international school in New Orleans, Louisiana. As of 2021 (2020-2021 school year) it serves Pre-Kindergarten through grade 10 and will add a new grade level each school year until it is a full PK-12 school. It is under the Orleans Parish School Board (OPSB).

It is in Uptown New Orleans. The school has two campuses: Patton Campus and Johnson Campus, the latter in Carrollton. It plans to establish the former Alfred C. Priestley Junior High School as its new campus; the school acquired the property in 2015. It is in Pigeon Town, in the Leonidas neighborhood. It is accredited by the Agency for French Education Abroad (AEFE). Its governing organization is a non-profit organization Lycée Français de la Nouvelle Orléans, Inc.

== History ==
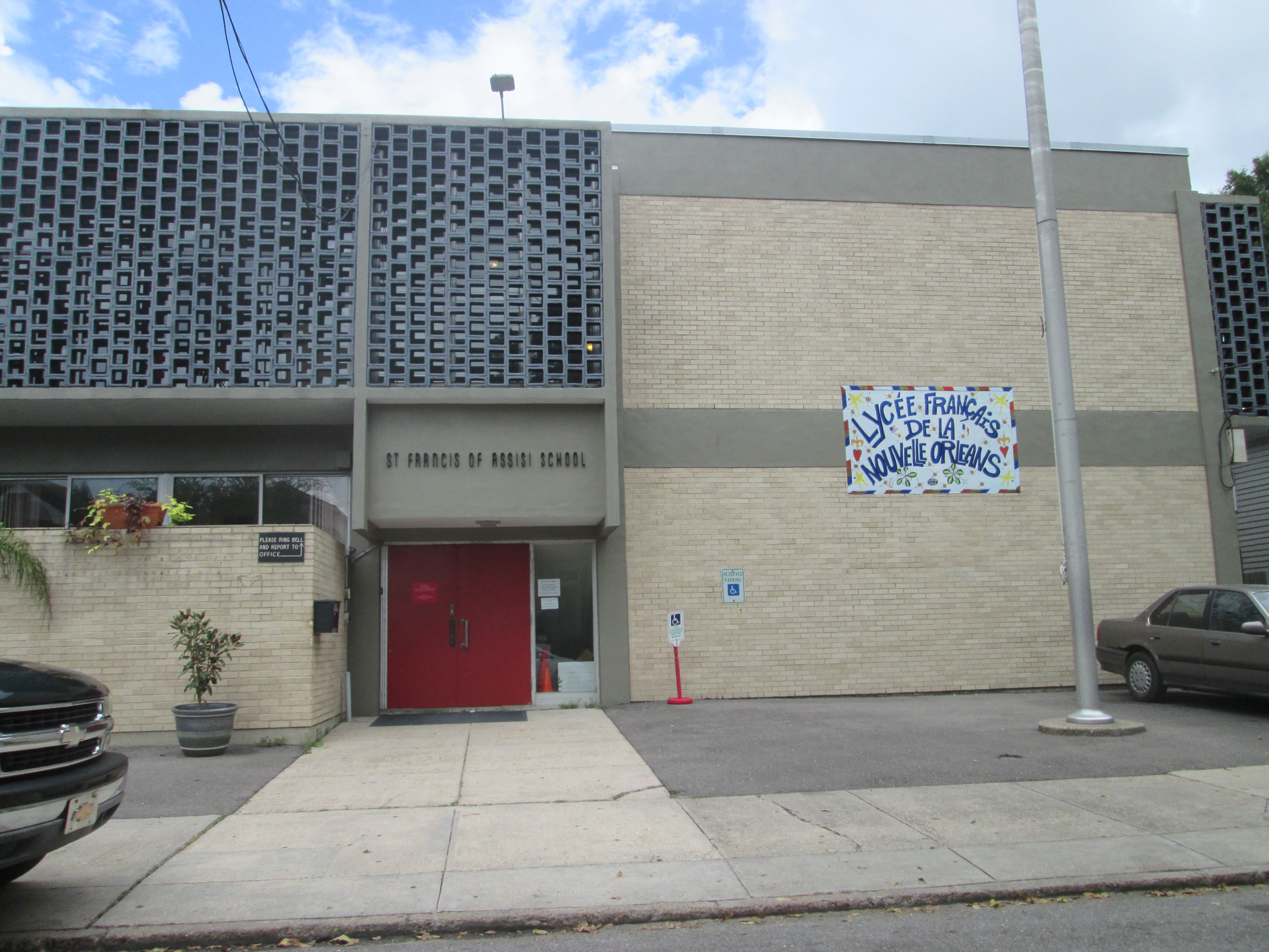
Patton St. Campus, the former St. Francis of Assisi School, in September 2014

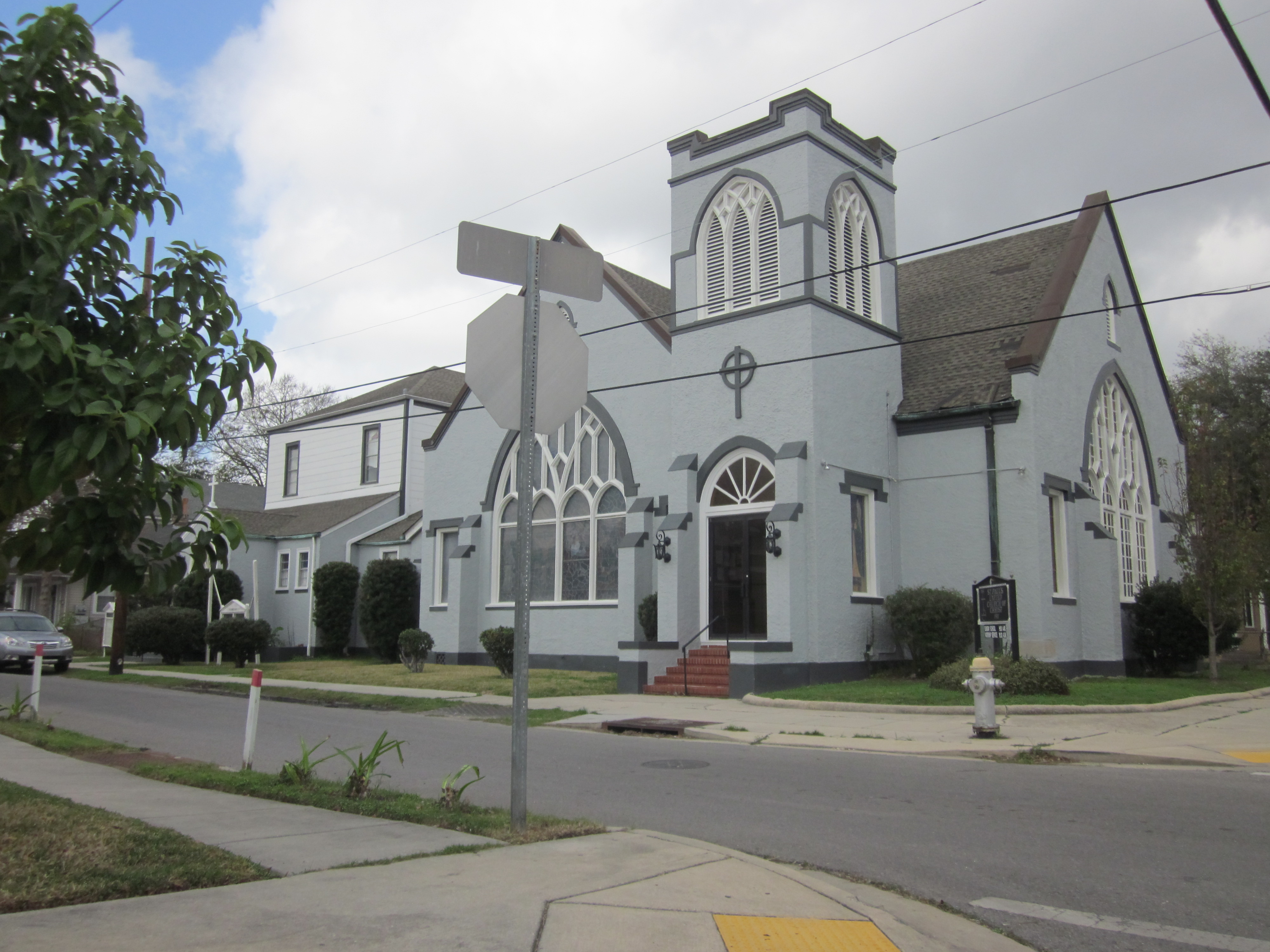
St. Paul's Church of Christ, Eleonore & Patton Streets, Uptown New Orleans

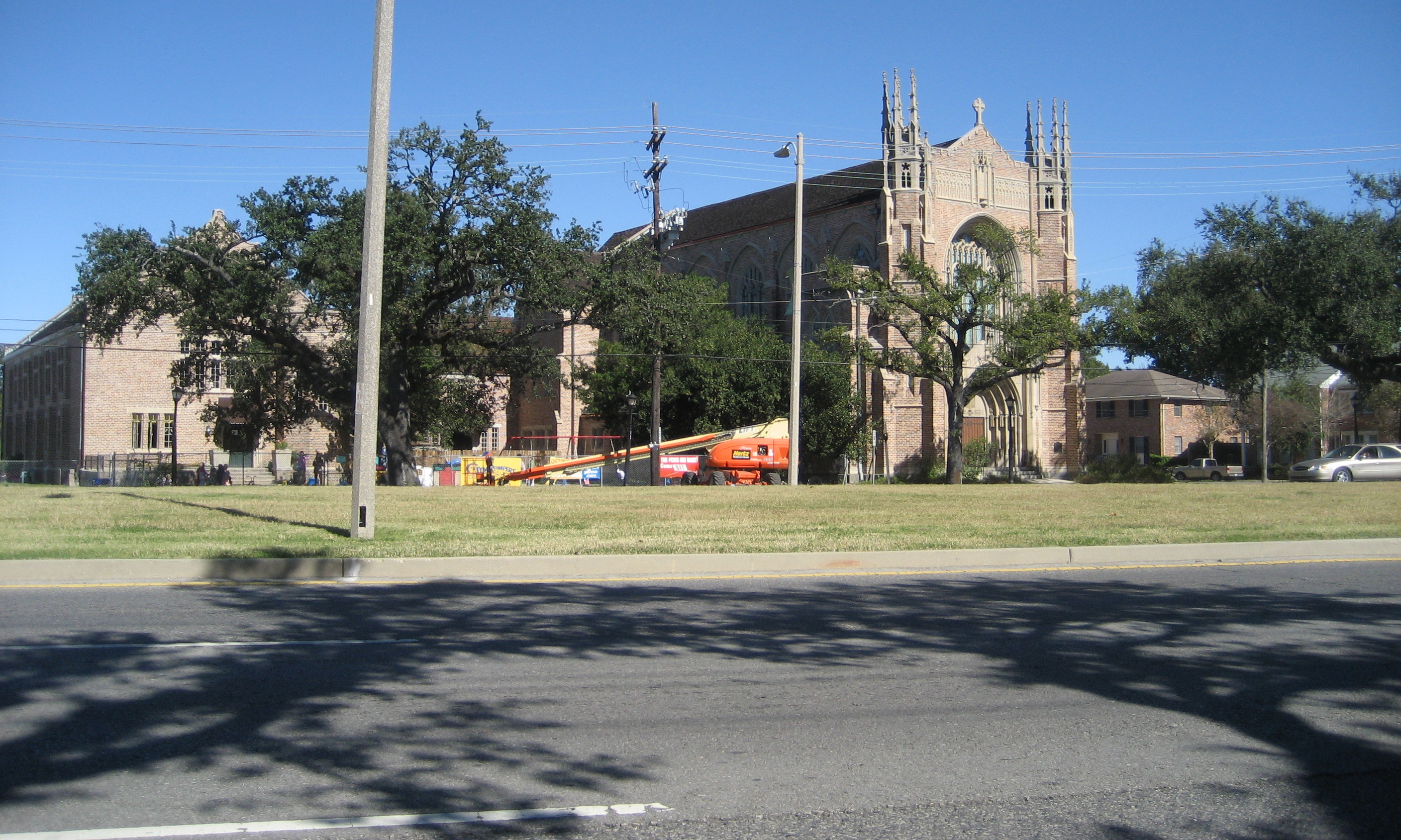
Claiborne Avenue, showing buildings attached to First Presbyterian Church

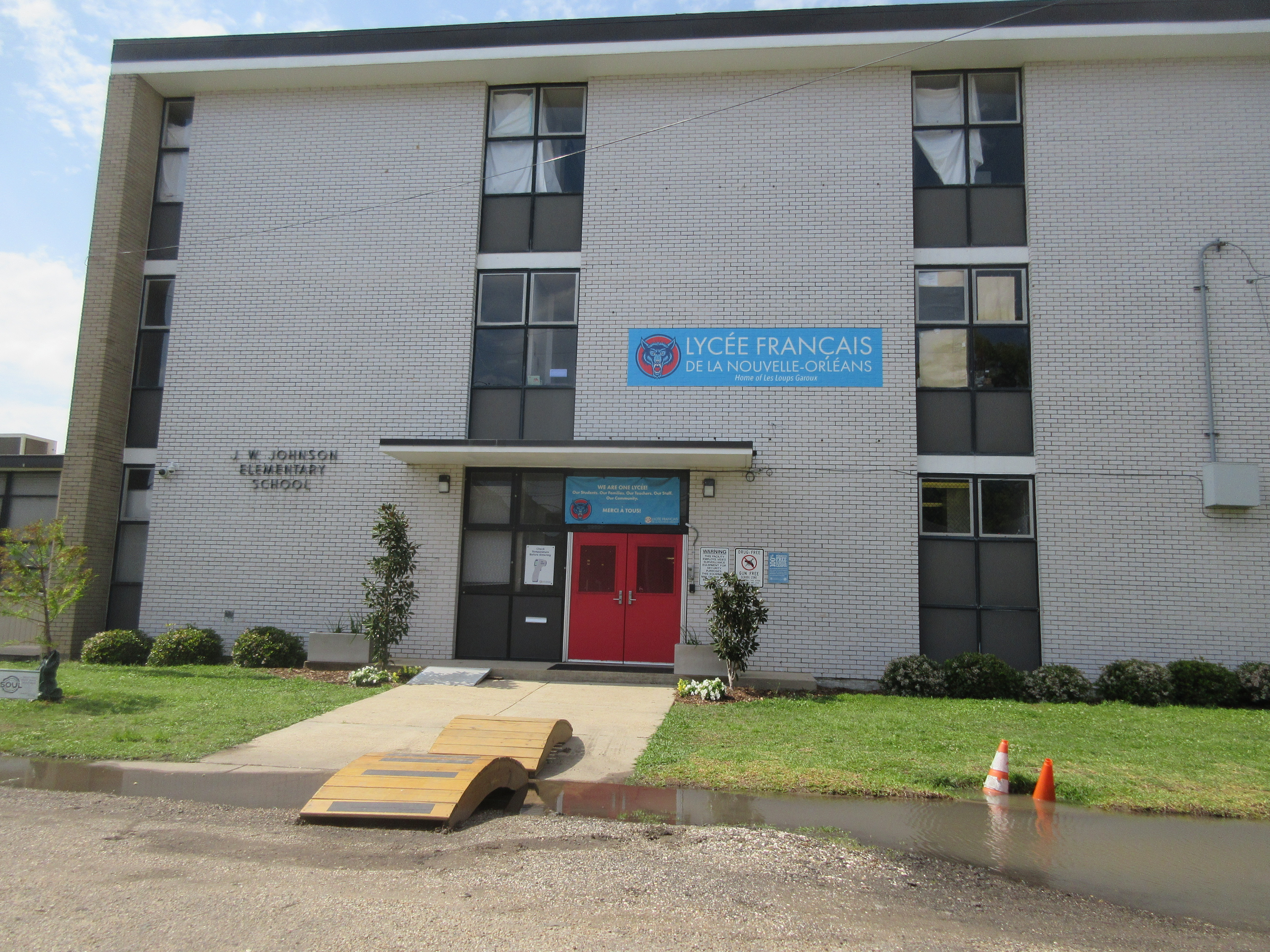
Monroe Street, 2021

The school opened in 2011.

Originally the school operated out of the Audubon Zoo and the First Presbyterian Church, with three classrooms at each location. That year the school was making plans to sign a lease on a school building. The school had to rent facilities since, according to its charter classification, the Louisiana state government and the OPSB did not guarantee the school facilities. Jill Otis was the first CEO of the school. The Louisiana Board of Elementary and Secondary Education (BESE) authorized the charter of the school. It was not a part of the Recovery School District (RSD).

In November 2011 St. Francis of Assisi Church agreed to lease its school building to the lycee. Milestone SABIS Academy previously leased the building; the Milestone SABIS school leadership learned of the change through the media.

In April 2012, Jean-Jacques Grandiere became the interim CEO. By fall 2012 the school received a deficit of $80,000, and the school had to lay off some employees. At that time Grandiere had resigned. The chairperson of the board hired a former McGehee School employee, Gisele Schexnider, as the interim CEO. In response some parents complained to the Louisiana state government. Danielle Dreilinger of The Times-Picayune stated that this decision resulted in "Trust [having] bottomed out". Parents critical believed that the decision happened too quickly and that it was not right that the hiring was done without a previous superintendent search. There was also a group of parents who supported Schexnider.

On January 11, 2013, parents filed a formal complaint with the BESE. In response, John White, the Louisiana state superintendent of education, appointed a person to assist the school to get a permanent leader, Jeremy Hunnewell, who was of both EMH Strategy and the Louisiana Association of Public Charter Schools, in December 2012; this was a decision Dreilinger described as unexpected. In 2013, due to the initial sudden changes in leadership, Dreilinger described the school as "troubled".

The board had selected Mireille Rabaté as the new CEO for 2013 but she declined the job. On July 1, 2013, Keith Bartlett became the new CEO. Its tentative enrollment for fall 2013 was 400 and it covered up to the third grade.

In 2014 the school joined the Association of French Schools in North America (AFSA, French: Association des Écoles française d’Amérique du Nord, AEFA) group and received accreditation from the French Ministry of Education.

In 2015 it had 466 students. That year, the OPSB sold the three-story former Alfred C. Priestly Junior High School campus to the Lycee.

By 2016 the school had 721 students. It had two additional campuses: St. Paul's United Church of Christ, and Central St. Matthew United Church of Christ, the latter beginning in 2016. That year the student population was expanding and the school was seeking additional temporary space.

In 2016 the lycee's board approved plans to ask to open a campus at the former James Weldon Johnson Elementary School in Carrollton. Space in Johnson opened up since Sophie B. Wright Charter School vacated the building that year as renovation in its permanent facility had been completed. The request was approved in March 2017.

== Admissions ==
For students in grade 1 and above, admissions usually requires taking a test in the French language. In 2019 the Louisiana Board of Elementary and Secondary Education (BESE) allowed the school to give waivers for the French proficiency test to students who come from schools accredited by the French Ministry of Education and/or have passed the Diplôme d'Etudes en Langue Française.

== Campuses ==
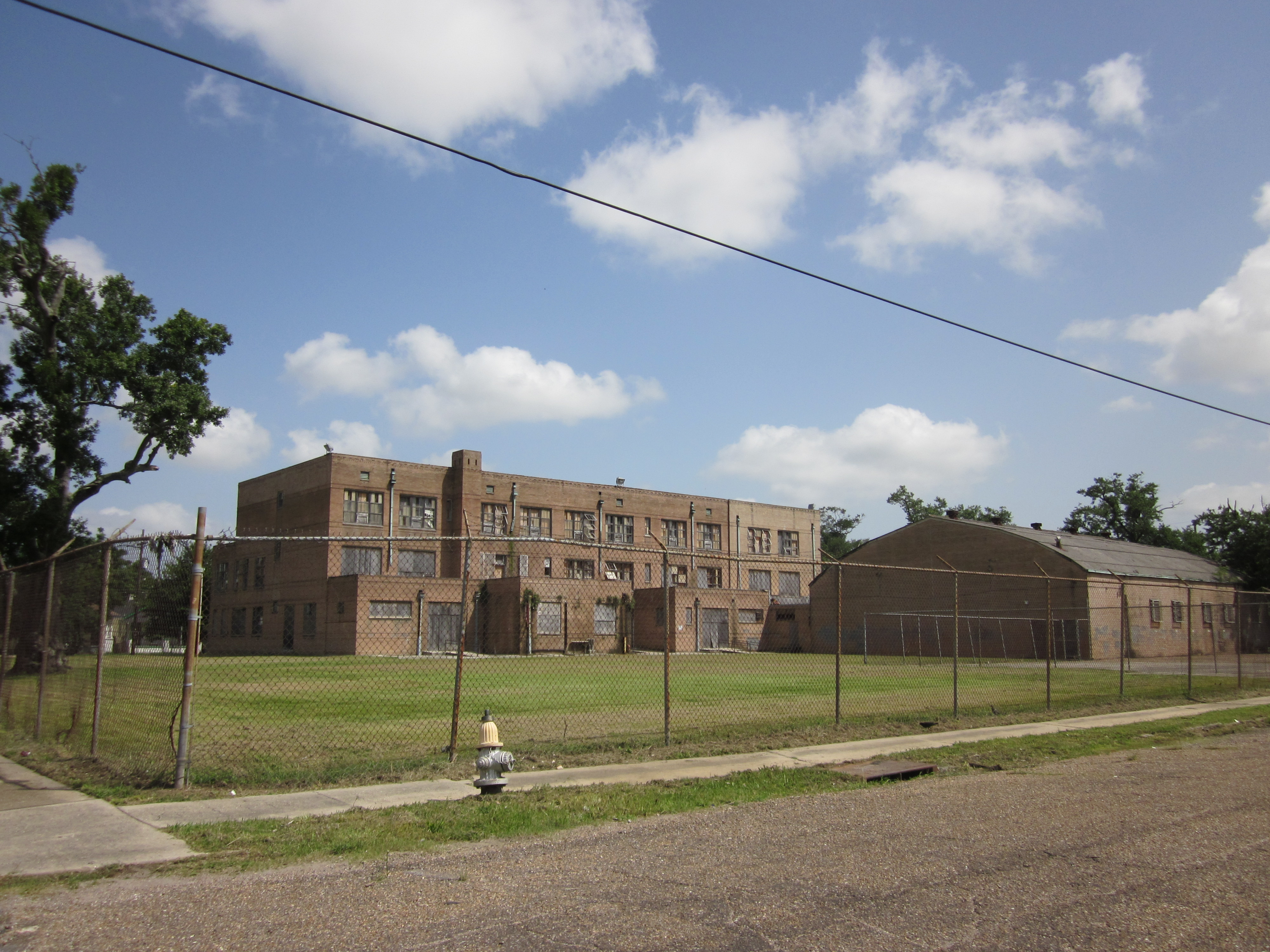
The old Priestly School complex, vacant in 2010

The new Lycee school building, the former Priestly Junior High School, is in the Pigeon Town/Pension Town area, in Leonidas. The Priestly building has a total of 32,000 square feet (3,000 m^{2}) of space. The 1955-built gymnasium had a total of 6,500 square feet (600 m^{2}) of space. The Priestly building/complex was worth about $425,000 in 2015; Martha Jewson of The Times-Picayune wrote that the school would need to spend at least $9 million to make the building student-worthy. According to a 2008 report from the OPSB, "The facility has extensive damage, and most is beyond repair." The property makes up a single city block.

In 1980 Priestly junior high had closed. From 1980 to 1993 the building housed offices, and from 1993 to 2005 it was used to store furniture. Hurricane Katrina disrupted the latter usage. OPSB owned the school building but sought to sell it as it deemed the building to be not needed. As per Louisiana law, charter school operators had priority in buying school buildings ahead of private entities. In 2015 all members of the lycee board agreed to purchase it. There was a website operated by people who opposed the Lycee buying Priestly. A group of area residents advocated instead for a health center to the at Priestly.

The Johnson campus is in proximity to Priestly.

It formerly operated the Claiborne Campus and the St. Paul Campus.
