= Everette Maddox =

American poet

- Everette Maddox
- Born: Everette Hawthorne Maddox; 1944; Prattville, Alabama, U.S.
- Died: 13 February 1989 (aged 44); Charity Hospital, New Orleans, Louisiana, U.S.
- Citizenship: American
- Education: University of Alabama
- Occupations: Poet, teacher
- Writing career
- Notable works: The 13 Original Poems (1976) * The Everette Maddox Songbook (1982) * Bar Scotch (1988)

Everette "Rhett" Maddox (1944–1989) was an American poet who in 1979 co-founded (with Robert Stock and sculptor Franz Heldner) the longest-running poetry-reading series in the South at the Maple Leaf Bar in New Orleans, Louisiana.

== Biography ==
Maddox was born near Prattville, Alabama. He studied at the University of Alabama, where he did his doctoral work but did not graduate.

He moved to New Orleans; beginning in 1975, he taught at Xavier University but lost that position and later became homeless. Also in 1975, he became an associate editor for Louis Gallo's Burataria Review, then started organizing and MCing at the Maple Leaf Bar.

Maddox's work was published in The New Yorker and The Paris Review. He published two books of poetry; a third was published posthumously. "Rette's Last Stand: Poems by Everette Maddox", a posthumous collection. Celia Lewis and Bob Woolf, Editors. Published by The Tensaw Press. Mobile, Alabama. 2004. Celia Lewis, Publisher. Umpteen Ways of Looking at a Possum: Critical and Creative Responses to Everette Maddox, edited by Grace Bauer and Julie Kane. In 2009 another selection of his poetry was published by the University of New Orleans Press, edited by Ralph Adama, I Hope Its Not Over And Goodby: Selected Poems of Everette Maddox.

Everette Maddox died from complications of esophageal cancer on February 13, 1989. His ashes are buried in the patio behind the Maple Leaf Bar under a stone that reads: "Everette Maddox – He was a mess."

== Bibliography ==
- The 13 Original Poems
- The Everette Maddox Songbook
- Bar Scotch
- American Waste
- I Hope Its Not Over And Goodby: Selected Poems of Everette Maddox (2009)

== Poetry and criticism ==
- Grace Bauer; Julie Kane, eds. (2006). Umpteen Ways of Looking at a Possum: Critical and Creative Responses to Everette Maddox. Xavier Review Press. ISBN 978-1-883275-16-7.
