= Oak Street =

Oak Street may refer to:

- Oak Street (Vancouver)
- Oak Street (Chicago)
- Oak Street (New Orleans)
- The End of Oak Street, a 2026 survival film directed by David Robert Mitchell
