= Wright Middle School =

Wright Middle School may refer to:

- Wilbur Wright Middle School, Munster, Indiana
- Sophie B. Wright Charter School, formerly Sophie B. Wright Middle School, New Orleans, Louisiana
- Wilbur Wright Middle School (Ohio), Dayton, Ohio
