= Krewe of Carrollton =

New Orleans Mardi Gras krewe

- Abbreviation: KoC
- Formation: 1924; 102 years ago
- Founded at: New Orleans, LA.
- Type: Carnival Krewe
- Location: Uptown, New Orleans, LA.
- Members: 700+
- Website: kreweofcarrollton.org

Krewe of Carrollton is a New Orleans Mardi Gras krewe.

== History and formation ==
The Krewe of Carrollton was formed from the Seventh District Carnival Club by Oak Street merchants in 1924 and is the 4th oldest Krewe in New Orleans

The riding membership now includes over 700 men. The krewe owns its own floats, which are stored in a den on Oak Street and are often rented out to other krewes for their parades.

== Parade ==
The original parade route was around the Carrollton neighborhood centering upon Maple and Oak street commercial districts. Until 1948 Krewe of Carrollton paraded on Mardi Gras day, the krewe now parades nine days before Fat Tuesday, during the first full weekend of Mardi Gras parades. This weekend is now commonly referred to as "Carrollton Weekend" among locals.

=== Parade themes ===
- 1924 No Theme Chosen
- 1925 unknown
- 1926 unknown
- 1927 unknown
- 1928 unknown
- 1929 The Land of Nippon
- 1930 The Call of the Redmen
- 1931 The Land of Art
- 1932
- 1933 'Happy Dreams”
- 1934 unknown
- 1935 unknown
- 1936 Aladdin and His Wonderful Lamp
- 1937 The Legend of the Masques
- 1938 Holidays
- 1939 Rhymes
- 1940 The Kingdom of Nature
- 1941 Ancient Lands
- 1942 No parade held
- 1943 No parade held
- 1944 No parade held
- 1945 No parade held
- 1946 No parade held
- 1947 Fantasy of Fairy Tales
- 1948 Favorite Songs of the American Past
- 1949 Holidays Around the World
- 1950 The Rise and Fall of King Winter
- 1951 Scenes of Beauty
- 1952 Nature's Colorful Realm
- 1953 Wedding Anniversaries
- 1954 Between the Bookends
- 1955 Toyland After Midnight
- 1956 Bluebird
- 1957 Best Loved Poems
- 1958 The Glittering Festival
- 1959 Fantasy Land
- 1960 The Nutcracker
- 1961 Memories of a Concert Hall
- 1962 The Immortal Works of Victor Herbert
- 1963 Myths and Legends
- 1964 Romantic Melodies
- 1965 The Eternal Cycle
- 1966 Reveries Over a Scrapbook
- 1967 Highlights of American History
- 1968 Saga of the Mississippi
- 1969 The Sciences
- 1970 Tales of History and Legend
- 1971 Silver Memories
- 1972 Songs to Remember
- 1973 The Golden Years of Broadway
- 1974 It's 50 Years
- 1975 Theatre Tunes
- 1976 We the People
- 1977 Toys
- 1978 The Four Seasons
- 1979 A Tribute to the Sunbelt States
- 1980 Holidays
- 1981 Around the World with Songs
- 1982 Wonders of the Sea
- 1983 Cinema Classics
- 1984 As Time Goes By
- 1985 Magical Moments in Music
- 1986 The Best of Everything
- 1987 Truly American
- 1988 Cities and Parishes of South Louisiana
- 1989 Festivals of North Louisiana
- 1990 Memories
- 1991 Follow Your Dreams
- 1992 Do You Know What It Means to Miss New Orleans?
- 1993 Famous Fairy Tales
- 1994 70 Years of Nostalgia
- 1995 Carrollton Travels the USA
- 1996 Carrollton Salutes Famous Americans
- 1997 Believe It or Not
- 1998 Carrollton Shoots the Movies
- 1999 Through the Years
- 2000 A Family Affair
- 2001 A Musical Odyssey
- 2002 Splendors of Nature
- 2003 Childhood Memories
- 2004 Streets on Parade
- 2005 A Quest for History
- 2006 Blue Roof Blues
- 2007 Celebrate Good Times
- 2008 Name that Tune
- 2009 A Fair to Remember
- 2016 A Krewe for All Seasons
- 2017 Carrollton Jukebox
- 2018 A Stroll in the Park
- 2019 Treasures of the Seas
- 2020 Color Your World
- 2021 — All parades canceled due to Covid-19 Pandemic —
- 2022 Once Upon a Time
- 2023 All Things Golden
- 2024 100 Years of Carrollton Memories
- 2025 Carrollton Takes 101
- 2026 Date Night

During the krewe's 1 February 1970 ride, a float was overturned by a tornado while crossing the overpass on Jefferson Davis Parkway (now Norman C. Francis Parkway). Peter Latino Sr,. the 52-year old president of the krewe, was thrown 35 feet over the overpass and onto the adjacent railroad tracks, suffering massive head and internal injuries. He remained in a coma for 29 1/2 months (896 days) before passing away on 15 July 1972. As a result of this accident, riders in all parades are now required to wear safety harnesses while on a float.

=== Throws ===
Trinkets, collectables, masks, and beads tossed by hand from riders of the floats are called throws. Collectible throws from Krewe of Carrollton include multi-colored doubloon coins, fedoras, specialty beads, and go-cups.

Krewe of Carrollton are known for their hand decorated shrimp boots.
