= Carrollton Courthouse =

Historic building in New Orleans, Louisiana, US

Coordinates: 29.9438°N 90.1327°W

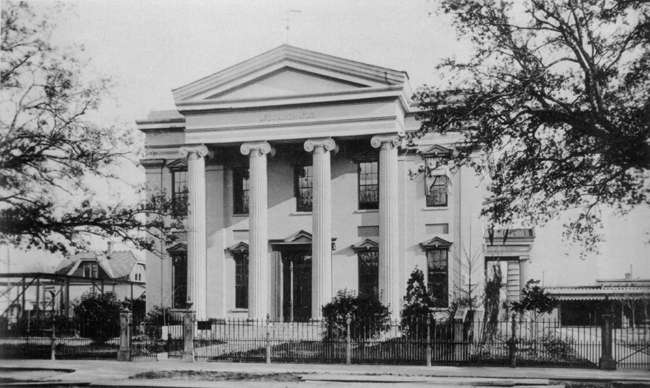
The Carrollton Courthouse

The Carrollton Courthouse (also Carrollton Court House) is a historic building in the Carrollton neighborhood of New Orleans, Louisiana, in the United States. Built in 1855, it originally served as a courthouse before being utilized by several public schools. In 2013, it became vacant after the previous tenant, a charter school, moved locations. In 2018, the Orleans Parish School Board sold the property to private developers. On February 15, 2023, the building was reopened as a luxury assisted living facility for senior citizens, after a three-year renovation to restore and repurpose the building.

== Construction and history as a courthouse ==
The Carrollton Courthouse is located at 701 South Carrollton Avenue, which at the time was called Canal Street.

It was once the courthouse for Jefferson Parish, Louisiana, before the town of Carrollton's annexation by New Orleans in 1874. The building was completed in 1855, after Carrollton had become the seat of Jefferson Parish following New Orleans' annexation of Lafayette (previously the parish seat). The courthouse was built alongside a new jail.

The property was purchased from C. C. Duncan for $7,000. Henry Howard, a prominent Louisiana architect, designed the building in the Jeffersonian Neo-classical style. Robert Crozier and Frederick Wing were the builders. The cost of construction was $59,000. Construction began in 1854 and was finished in late 1855, during the mayoralty of J. L. Donnellan.

The courthouse operated for nineteen years, and during this period those sentenced to death were hanged behind the courthouse. A number of noteworthy events in Louisiana legal history took place in the building. In 1858, an election dispute was heard in the building after an election for mayor and council in the Town of Carrollton was marred by armed violence and intimidation. The district judge nullified the election, but the Louisiana Supreme Court reversed, finding that the residents challenging the election lacked standing to contest the result. In 1858, the case Joseph Tom v. The Slave Ernest was heard, and the district judge decided that "Slaves are persons, not things, and cannot therefore be seized provisionally." In 1865, a murder trial took place in which the trial judge held that the dying declaration of the ten-year-old victim could be admitted into evidence; the ruling was upheld the next year by the Louisiana Supreme Court.

== Subsequent use as a school ==
After Carrollton's annexation by the City of New Orleans in 1874, John McDonogh made a donation for the city to purchase the property, and in 1889 (following renovations), the former courthouse opened as the John McDonogh No. 23 School. The school was the first school in the state to celebrate Arbor Day, and many present-day trees around the building are the result of Arbor Day plantings.

In the 1950s, the building sat vacant for a time before becoming the home of Benjamin Franklin Senior High School, which was dedicated on November 10, 1957. The petition-gathering work of Charles Meynier, a local merchant and graduate of the John McDonogh No. 23 School, was instrumental in persuading the New Orleans School Board to use the building as a school.

The high school moved to a new site in 1989–90, and the Lusher Middle School and later the Audubon Charter School (4th through 8th grade) moved into the site. The Audubon school moved into the old McDonogh No. 7 campus on Milan Street, and the building became vacant in 2013.

== Vacancy and future ==
In September 2014, the building was offered for sale by the Orleans Parish School Board (at an appraised value of $2.9 million). In accordance with Louisiana law, charter schools were offered the opportunity to buy the property first, but none were interested. The School Board has attempted to sell the property at auction. The building could legally be demolished, as there is no legally binding historic preservation requirement.

In 2015, the Louisiana Landmarks Society named the courthouse as one of its "New Orleans' Nine" list of the most endangered New Orleans historic landmarks. In the same year, the National Trust for Historic Preservation named the courthouse to its annual list of the "11 Most Endangered Historic Places" in the United States. The building requires extensive repairs and restoration.

In 2017, the property sold at auction to Carl Mittendorff, the Houston-based CEO of Colonial Oaks Senior Living, for $4.7 million. Mittendorff planned to convert the building to senior housing for memory-care patients.

By 2018, the ownership structure was redefined as follows: Kayne Anderson of Los Angeles; Felicity Property Company of New Orleans; and Liberty Healthcare of Wilmington, N.C. The corporate mission—construction of a 100-bed memory-care facility—remains the same.

The architecture firm is Waggonner and Ball. Batture, LLC, Engineers and Surveyors is a subcontractor for W&B.

Demolition/construction on the site commenced in the spring of 2021.

In a public hearing of July 7, 2021, the New Orleans HDLC censured the developer for the illegal demolition of the historic "Courthouse schoolhouse" on the Maple Street side of campus.

The building opened as an assisted living home, after renovations, in February 2023.
