= Maple Leaf Bar =

Music performance venue in New Orleans, Louisiana

Coordinates: 29.949080°N 90.131986°W

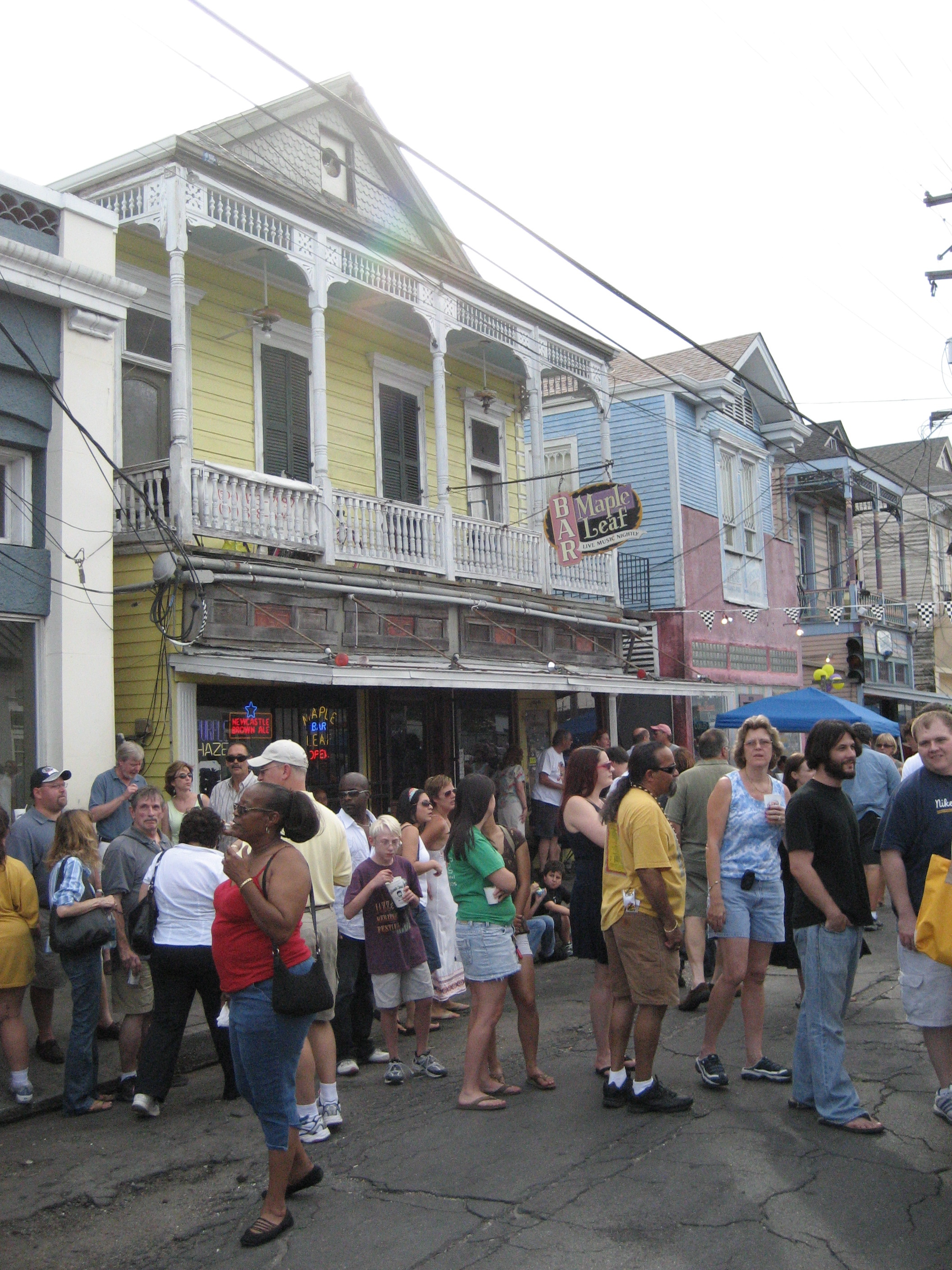
Exterior view of the Maple Leaf on Oak Street in 2007

The Maple Leaf Bar is a music performance venue in New Orleans, Louisiana, United States. It is also a bar and hosts other events.

== Background ==
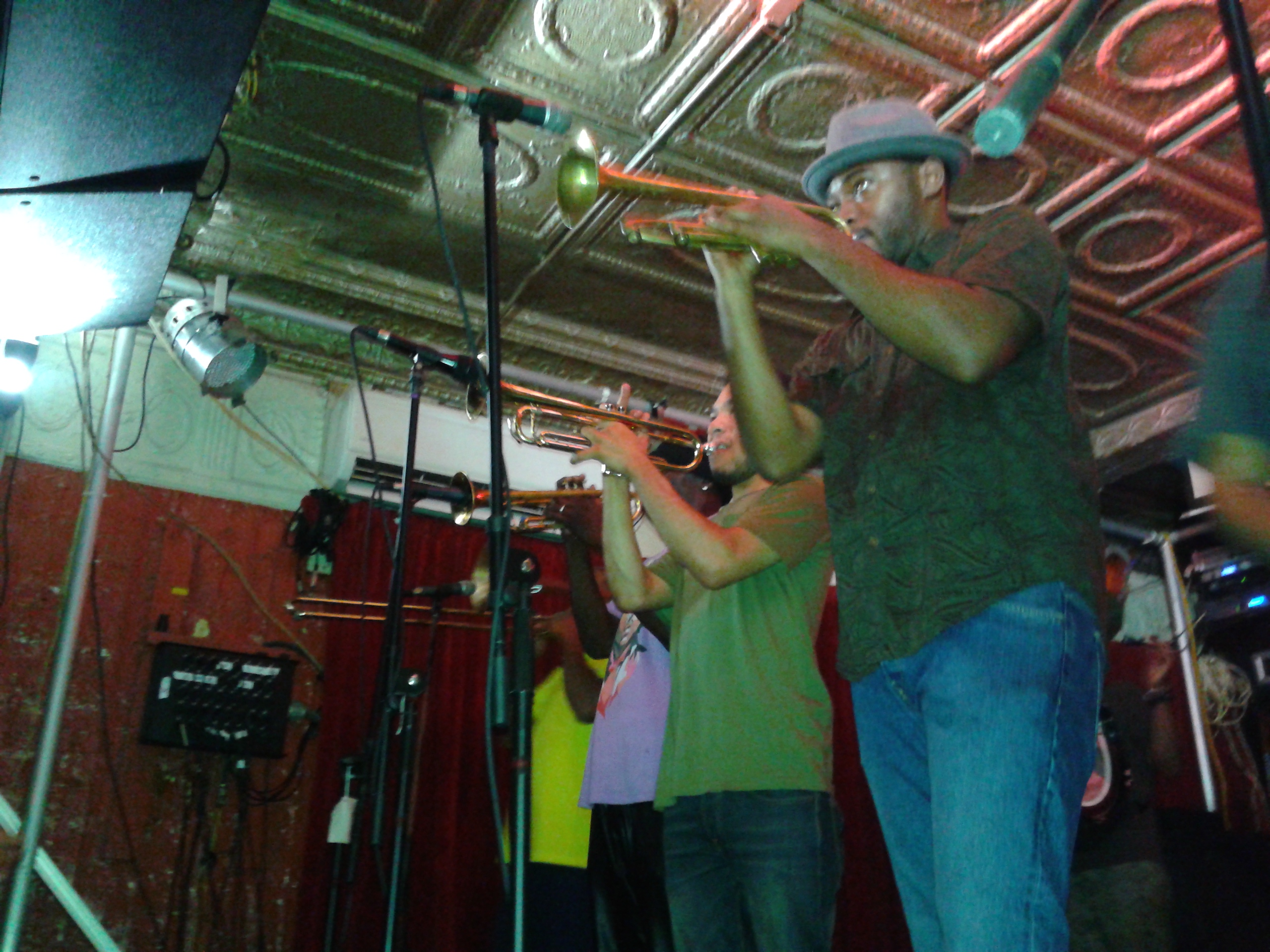
Rebirth Brass Band performing at the Maple Leaf on December 15, 2015

The Maple Leaf is located at 8316 Oak Street in the Carrollton neighborhood. Opened on February 24, 1974, it is one of the longest continuously operating New Orleans music clubs with live performances seven nights a week.

On the first night Andrew Hall's Society Jazz Band played and were there every Saturday for seven years. Many of the old time musicians were featured, including members of the Preservation Hall Jazz Band. The Society Jazz Band left in the summer of 1981 but have played there several times since then, including the 30th birthday party in 2004 and the 40th birthday party in 2014. Musical styles represented include blues, funk, R&B, rock, zydeco, jazz, jam bands.

Frequent performers have included James Booker, Rebirth Brass Band, Clarence "Gatemouth" Brown, Henry Butler, Walter "Wolfman" Washington, Papa Grows Funk, and The Radiators. The bar has been an incubator for young bands formed by students at Tulane University, Loyola University, and the University of New Orleans.

In recent history, the bar has weekly hosted residencies from acts such as Tank and the Bangas, The Revivalists, George Porter Jr., Jon Cleary (musician) and Johnny Vidacovich. Porter still holds a weekly, Monday night residency at the bar with his trio, featuring Terrence Houston, and Michael "Goldenthroat" Lemmler.

Poet Everette Maddox was so closely tied to the venue that his ashes are buried in the bar's patio area. The Maple Leaf hosts poetry readings and fashion shows. The Krewe of OAK starts and ends its parades at the Maple Leaf, where it holds its Krewe Ball.

The Maple Leaf is thinly disguised in the Ellen Gilchrist short story "The Raintree Street Bar and Washerteria" (the bar used to contain a laundromat). Poems about it can be found in Mirror Wars and Shards by Nancy Harris, Body and Soul and Rhythm & Booze by Julie Kane; The Everette Maddox Song Book, Bar Scotch, and American Waste by Everette Maddox; and in the anthologies The Maple Leaf Rag (1980), The Maple Leaf Rag 15th Anniversary Anthology (1994), and Maple Leaf Rag III (2006).

== Hurricane Katrina ==
The Maple Leaf was closed for several weeks in the aftermath of Hurricane Katrina. Owner Hank Staples remained in New Orleans to guard the bar and his other properties while vowing in interviews with to host the first concert in New Orleans after the storm. On September 30, 2005, Walter "Wolfman" Washington played the Maple Leaf's first post-Katrina show in New Orleans. (Some other local musicians who were playing in the aftermath of the storm dispute the claim that it was the city's first post-Katrina public performance, but this was the first to generate such sizable crowds and media attention.) That night many of the journalists, cameramen, and crew from NBC News and other media outlets joined the party and recorded the event. The band's equipment was powered by a diesel generator because electricity had not yet been restored to most of the city. The concert was shut down by police and National Guard because the city was under a curfew. Electricity was restored to this section of the city about a week later.

== Live albums ==
- James Booker / Resurrection of the Bayou Maharajah (1993)
- Rebirth Brass Band / The Main Event: Live at the Maple Leaf (1999)
- Papa Grows Funk / Live at the Leaf (2006)
- Joe Krown, Walter "Wolfman" Washington, Russell Batiste, Jr. / Live at the Maple Leaf (2008)
- New Orleans Suspects / Caught Live at the Maple Leaf (2012)
- The Rumble / Live from the Maple Leaf (2023) - Grammy Nominated

== See also ==
- List of jazz clubs
- List of music venues
- Rebirth Brass Band
