= Camellia Grill =

The Camellia Grill
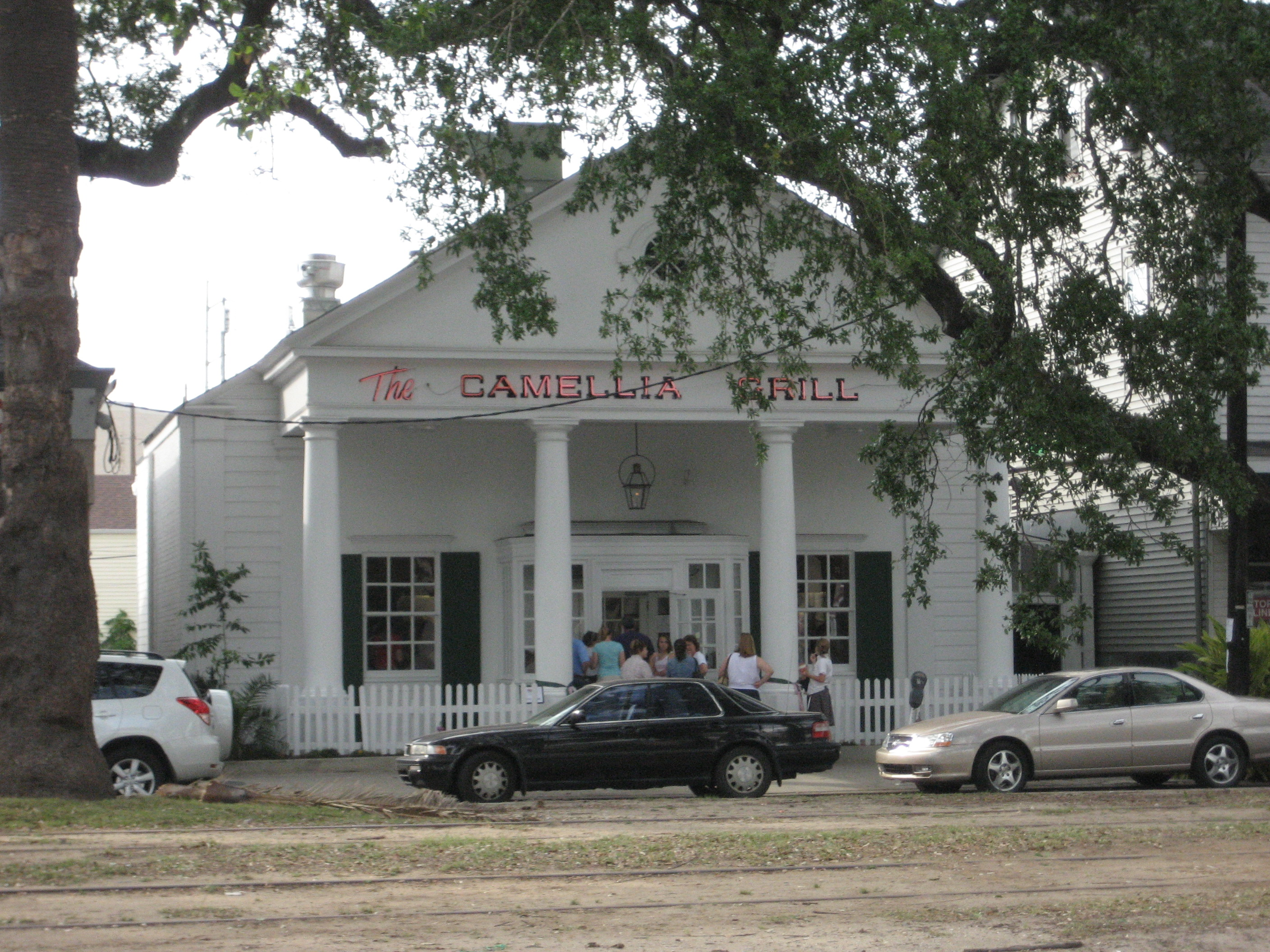
- A line out the door at Camellia Grill
- Interactive map of The Camellia Grill

Restaurant information
- Established: December 19, 1946
- Owner: Hicham Khodr
- Food type: North American cuisine
- Dress code: Casual
- Location: 626 South Carrollton Avenue, New Orleans, LA, 70118, Carrollton section of New Orleans, Louisiana, 70118, United States
- Coordinates: 29.943695°N 90.133704°W
- Seating capacity: Counter Service (29 Stools)( outside seating)
- Reservations: None
- Website: http://www.camelliagrillnola.com/

The Camellia Grill is a landmark diner in the Carrollton section (Uptown) of New Orleans. It is on Carrollton Avenue near its intersection with St. Charles Avenue on the St. Charles Streetcar line.

== History ==
The Camellia Grill first opened its doors on December 19, 1946. Despite suffering little physical damage, the restaurant was closed after Hurricane Katrina until April 2007, when it reopened under new ownership. During this period of closure, the Camellia Grill's front door was festooned with hundreds of notes from locals and tourists who missed it.

The restaurant main eating area is counter service it has outside seating when available and its staff is usually gregarious. It is well known for its long-serving waiters, the most famous of whom was probably Harry Tervalon, Sr., who was the first waiter hired in 1946, and who even after his 1996 retirement remained associated with the restaurant (including cutting the ribbon when the Grill finally reopened after Katrina), until his death in August 2007.

The restaurant was purchased in 2006 by local restaurateur Hicham Khodr, who later opened two now-closed branches in the French Quarter and Destin, Florida. In May 2012, a state court ruled that Khodr was in breach of his licensing agreement with the former owner, and this ruling was upheld on appeal in May 2013, meaning that Khodr could be required to change the name of the restaurants. However, in July 2015 he won the right to continue using the restaurant's trademark, name and logo.

== Dishes ==
The establishment is noted for such casual cuisine as giant omelettes, cheeseburgers, "freezes," and pecan pie heated on the grill.
