= Carrollton, New Orleans =

- Carrollton Historic District
- U.S. National Register of Historic Places
- U.S. Historic district
- Sign on Carrollton Avenue near St. Charles Avenue

- Location within Louisiana Location within the United States
- Location: Roughly bounded by Lowerline St., Mississippi River, Monticello Ave., & Earhart Blvd., New Orleans, Louisiana
- Coordinates: 29°57′8″N 90°7′38″W
- Built: 1840
- Architect: Multiple
- Architectural style: Colonial Revival, Bungalow/Craftsman, Italianate
- NRHP reference No.: 87001893
- Added to NRHP: November 02, 1987

Carrollton is a historic neighborhood of Uptown New Orleans, Louisiana, USA, which includes the Carrollton Historic District, recognized by the Historic District Landmark Commission. It is the part of Uptown New Orleans farthest upriver.. It was historically a separate town, laid out in 1833 and incorporated on March 10, 1845. Carrollton was annexed by New Orleans in 1874 (becoming the city's 16th and 17th Wards), but it has long retained some elements of distinct identity.

Historically the boundaries of the city of Carrollton were the Mississippi River, the downriver border of Jefferson Parish, Louisiana, Fig Street, and Lowerline Street. The area on the river side of Claiborne Avenue is sometimes referred to as "Old Carrollton". The incorporation of Carrollton created an apparent anomaly in New Orleans street names; Lowerline is upriver from Upperline Street, which was originally the upriver boundary of another suburb annexed in the 1850s.

== City overview ==
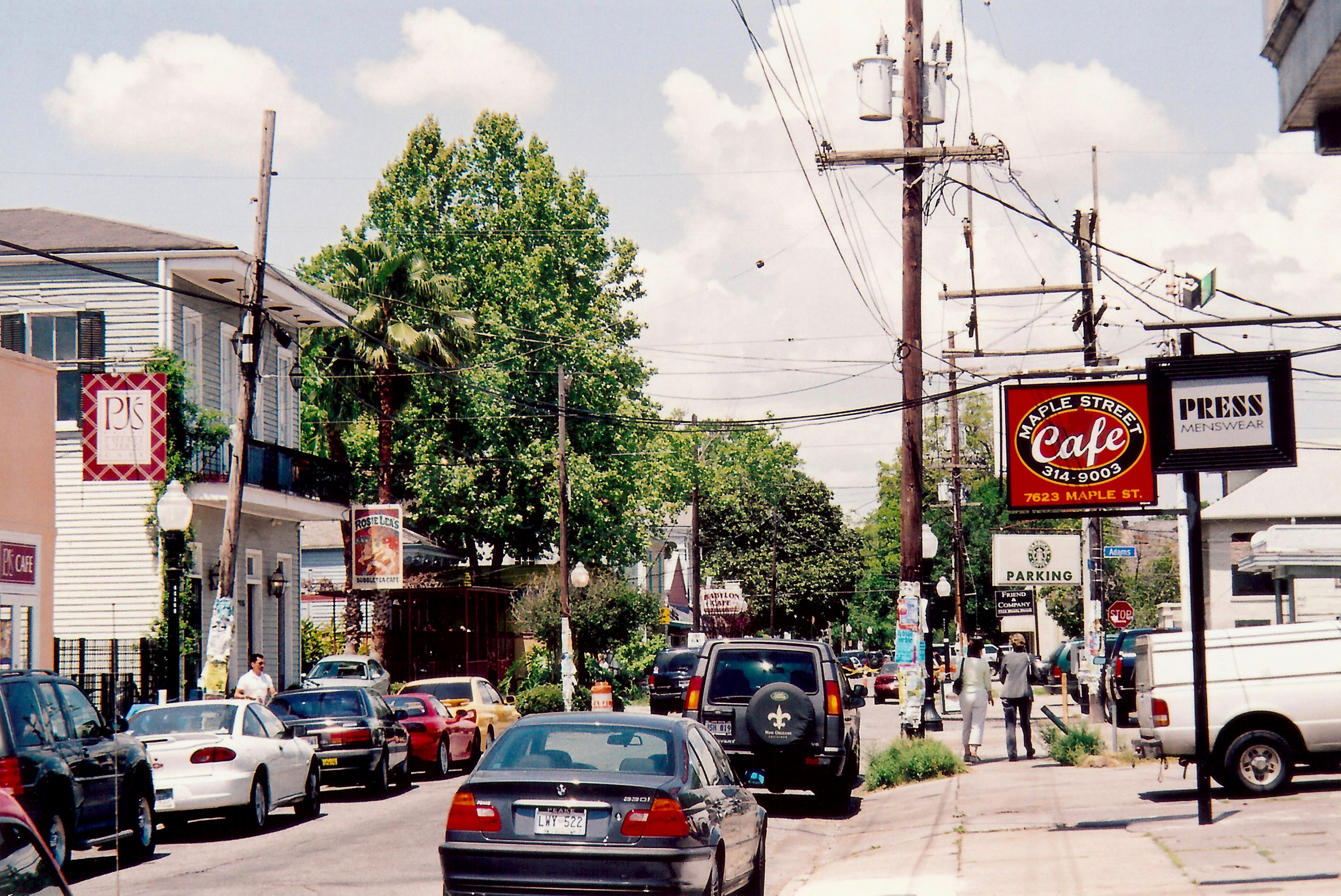
Small businesses line Maple Street

The main street is broad Carrollton Avenue, lined with southern live oaks, with the St. Charles Avenue Streetcar running on the "neutral ground" or central median. The streetcar barn is a block off the avenue in Carrollton, on Willow Street, and the landmark Camellia Grill diner is near the corner of St. Charles and Carrollton Avenues. The neoclassical Carrollton Courthouse building is on Carrollton Avenue near the Mississippi; as of 2023, it houses The Carrollton, an upscale assisted living facility.

The neighborhood and Avenue are pronounced "kaa-rull-ton" or "kaa-ril-tin" by residents and other uptowners, but many people from the downtown parts of New Orleans (especially those born in the mid-20th century and earlier) pronounce the names as "Karl-ton".

Tulane University and Loyola University New Orleans are just a few blocks below Carrollton, and many students, faculty, and staff live in the area and patronize the businesses there.

In addition to Carrollton Avenue and Saint Charles Avenue, the neighborhood still retains two "neighborhood main streets" of mixed residential and commercial use. Lower Carrollton centers on Maple Street, with many restaurants, coffee houses, bars, and upscale shops. Upper Carrollton has Oak Street, formerly hosting somewhat larger businesses (such as Woolworth); current businesses there range from restaurants and shops to the best known of the neighborhood's live music venues, the Maple Leaf Bar.

In the northwest section of Carrollton on Claiborne Avenue is Marsalis Harmony Park (formerly Palmer Park), which hosts some art festivals and moderate sized live music festivals each year. The park has a monument to the Carrolltonians who died in World War I. After Hurricane Katrina, then called Palmer Park, hosted the monthly Mid-City art market, displaced from the more severely damaged Mid-City neighborhood.

The historically predominantly African-American part of Carrollton along the riverfront has been known since the mid-20th century as "Black Pearl." Mahalia Jackson, the "Queen of Gospel music", was from the Black Pearl section of Carrollton.

This part of Carrollton is documented as the location of "Rising Sun Hall" near the riverfront in the late 19th century, which seems to have been a building owned and used for meetings of a Social Aid & Pleasure Club, commonly rented out for dances and functions. This is one possible inspiration for the legendary song "The House of the Rising Sun." Definite connections to gambling or prostitution, if any, are undocumented for either of these buildings, neither of which still exists.

Other smaller, sub-neighborhoods in the area are called Leonidas/Pigeontown, Riverbend, and East Carrollton.

Most of Carrollton has long been ethnically mixed, with "free people of color" owning homes in other parts of the town before the Civil War. Many immigrants from Germany, Ireland, and other parts of the United States settled here in the 19th century.

The post of "mayor of Carrollton" survived to the 1980s, although it was an informal one, representing the concerns of the neighborhood to the New Orleans city council. As of 2004, the United States Postal Service continues to deliver mail addressed to "Carrollton, Louisiana." The ZIP Code is 70118.

During New Orleans Mardi Gras celebrations, the Krewe of OAK parades through Carrollton. The Phunny Phorty Phellows krewe also holds its "parade" in Carrollton, throwing beads from the streetcar to usher in the parades season on what is colloquially known as Twelfth Night, the Epiphany, January 6.

== Education ==
=== Primary and secondary schools ===
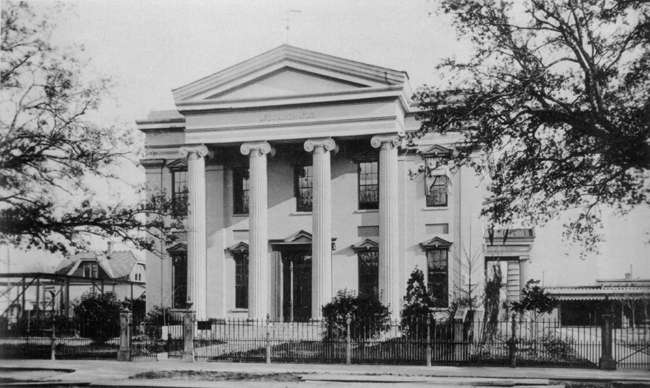
The Carrollton Courthouse as John McDonogh No. 23 Public School

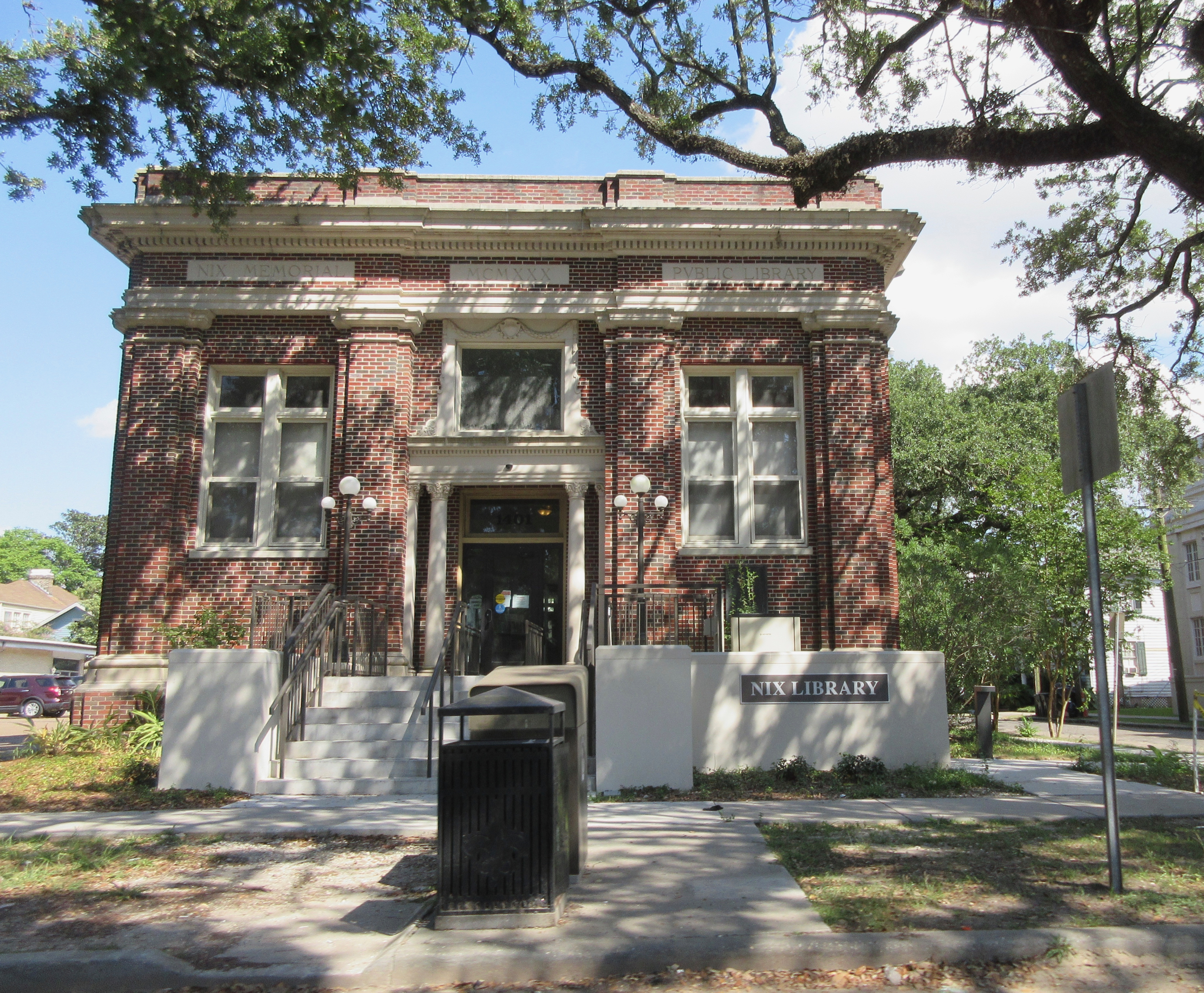
The Nix Library

New Orleans Public Schools and the Recovery School District serve Carrollton.

Prominent in the area is the Carrollton Courthouse, the former courthouse for the city of Carrollton (located at 719 South Carrollton Avenue). Designed by prominent New Orleans architect Henry Howard, who also designed many other notable buildings around Louisiana including Nottoway Plantation and Madewood Plantation, and completed in 1855, the site served as the courthouse for Carrollton and Jefferson Parish until the town was annexed onto New Orleans in 1874. Since then, the building has housed McDonogh 23 elementary school, Ben Franklin Senior High School, Lusher Elementary School's 6-8 extension (now The Willow School), and Audubon Charter School. The building was vacant from 2013 until 2023, when The Carrollton, an upscale assisted living facility, was opened.

There was a private school named the Carrollton Private School, founded to avoid racial integration in the 1950s. The school campus was located on Willow Street at corner of Monroe Street. Grades 1 thru 8.

In 2016 the board of Lycée Français de la Nouvelle-Orléans approved plans to ask to open a campus at the former James Weldon Johnson Elementary School in Carrollton. The request was approved in March 2017. That building temporarily housed Sophie B. Wright Charter School from 2013, until 2016.

=== Public libraries ===
The New Orleans Public Library operates the Nix Branch Library in Carrollton Riverbend. Robert Morris of the Uptown Messenger said that it was a "popular little" library. As of 2011 there was a "secret gardener" who watered the flowers on the library property.

== Trivia ==
The rap duo $uicideboy$ named a song on their album 'I Want To Die in New Orleans' after the neighborhood.
