= Carrollton Avenue =

Thoroughfare in New Orleans, Louisiana, US

Coordinates: 29.9556°N 90.1205°W

Carrollton Avenue is a major thoroughfare stretching 3.9 miles (6.3 km) across the Uptown/Carrollton and Mid-City districts of New Orleans. South Carrollton Avenue runs from St. Charles Avenue in the Riverbend in a northeast lake-bound direction through Carrollton and into Mid-City. After crossing Canal Street it continues as North Carrollton Avenue until intersecting with Esplanade Avenue and Wisner Boulevard at the entrance to City Park.

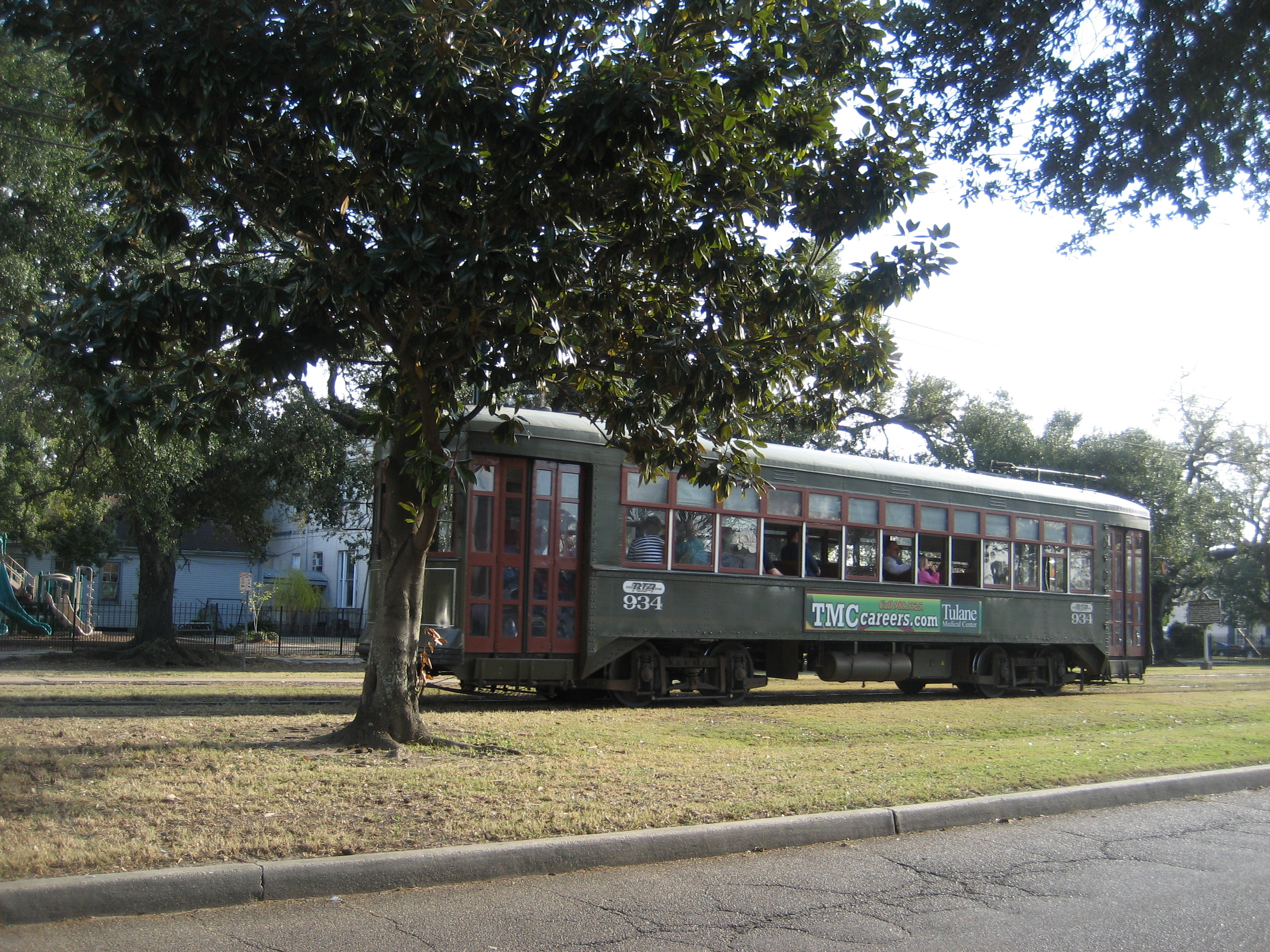
Streetcar running on the Riverbend end of Carrollton Avenue in the Old Carrollton neighborhood.

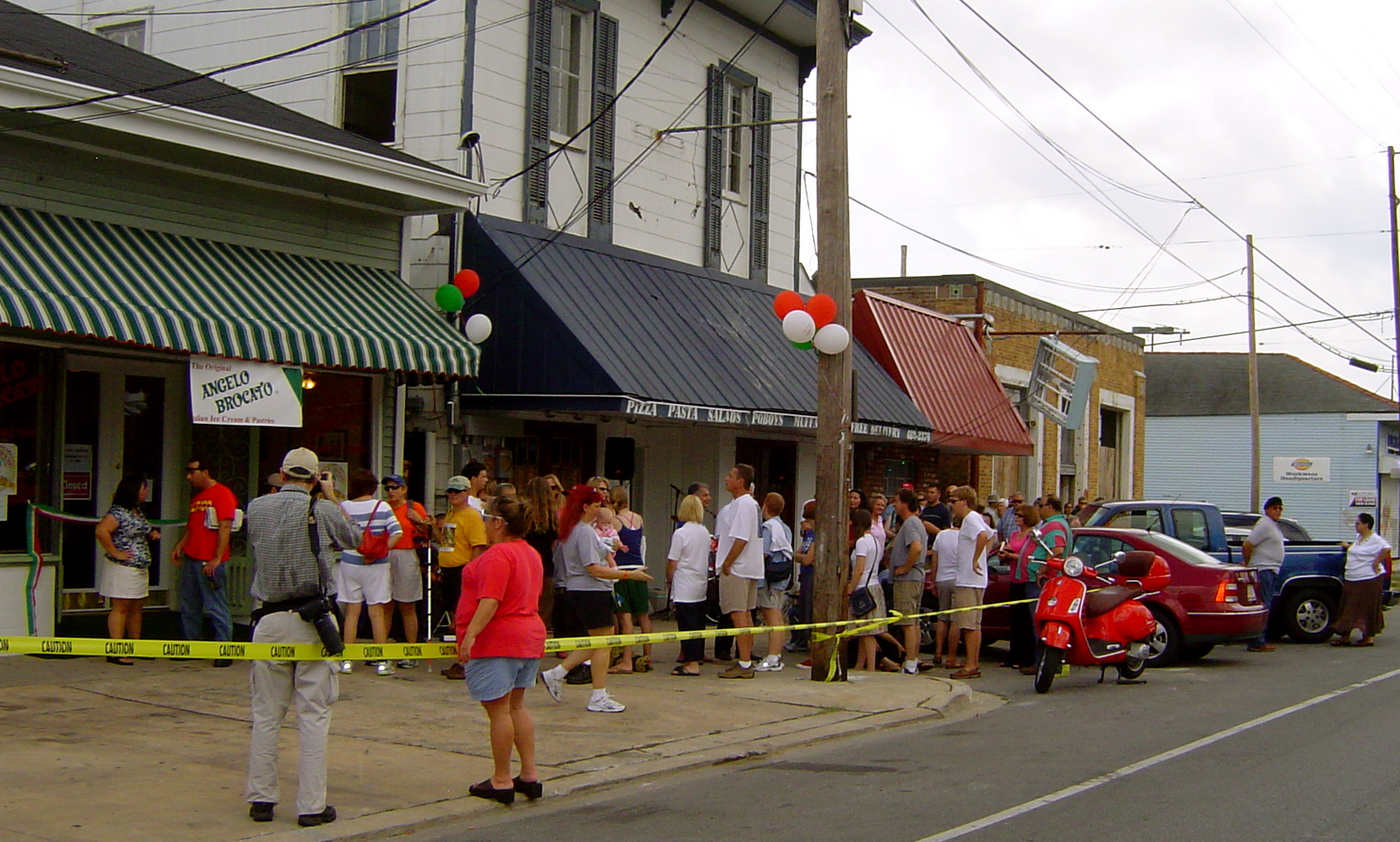
Line for the post-Katrina reopening of the century-old "Angelo Brocato" ice cream shop on Carrollton Avenue in Mid-City, 2006.

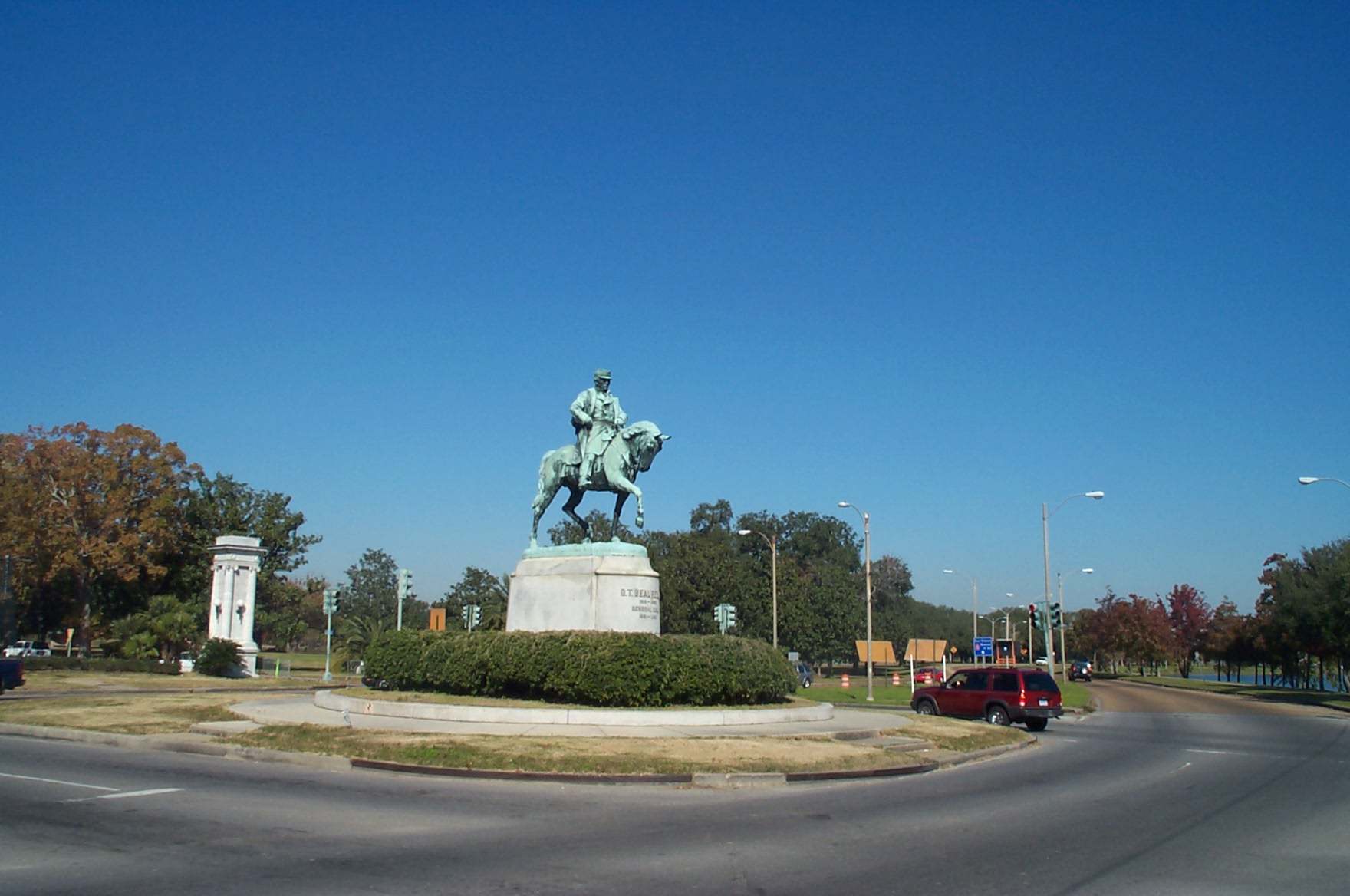
Equestrian statue of P.G.T. Beauregard by Alexander Doyle was at the inland end of Carrollton Avenue where it intersects with Esplanade at the entrance to City Park.

== Streetscape ==
Carrollton Avenue is a broad tree-covered avenue, with a large median (or neutral ground to locals) for most of its length. Riverside of South Claiborne Avenue, Carrollton has one lane of traffic and one lane of parking in each direction. The St. Charles Streetcar Line also runs along this section before turning onto St. Charles Avenue in the Riverbend. The landmark Camellia Grill is located near the streetcar turn. This section of the road is mostly residential with the exception of the commercial area of Riverbend.

Between South Claiborne Avenue and Earhart Boulevard, there are three lanes of traffic in each direction. This area is a mix of commercial and residential and is home to such landmarks as the Notre Dame Seminary and the Rock n' Bowl. Carrollton is entirely commercial between Earhart Boulevard and Tulane Avenue and maintains three lanes in each direction. Lakeside of Tulane Avenue, Carrollton returns to mostly residential area with the exception of some commercial areas between Canal Street and Bienville Street. This stretch of road is three lanes in each direction, however lakeside of Canal Street the inner lanes in each direction are shared by the Carrollton Spur of the Canal Streetcar Line.

Jesuit High School, an elite all-male Roman Catholic institution, is located at the corner of Carrollton and Banks Street.

== History ==
The Carrollton neighborhood was once an independent city and Carrollton Avenue was known as Canal Street in the city plans, so named because at the time it terminated at the New Basin Canal. The name was later changed to avoid confusion with Canal Street in downtown New Orleans.

== Transit routes ==
In addition to the Carrollton spurs of both the Canal Streetcar Line and St. Charles Streetcar Lines, two transit routes, operated by New Orleans Public Service at first and later New Orleans Regional Transit Authority, were assigned to South/North Carrollton Avenue: one local (est. in the 1950s, first known as just Carrollton, and later 90 Carrollton), the other an express (established June 16, 1958 as the very first nonstop route in New Orleans, first known as Express 70 - Carrollton via Earhart, later 34 Carrollton Express). Both routes were halted before Hurricane Katrina hit in August 2005; they have since been restored.

== Major intersections ==
Riverside to Lakeside:

- St. Charles Avenue
- South Claiborne Avenue
- Earhart Expressway
- Palmetto Street/Washington Avenue
- Interstate 10, Exit 232, "Toni Morrison Interchange"
- Airline Highway/Tulane Avenue (U.S. Route 61)
- Canal Street
- Orleans Avenue
- City Park Avenue
- Esplanade Avenue/Wisner Boulevard

== Neighborhood associations in Carrollton ==
- Central Carrollton Association

== See also ==
- List of streets of New Orleans
- Carrollton Courthouse
