= Grace Bauer =

American poet

Grace Bauer is an American poet. She lives in Nebraska, grew up in Pennsylvania and has also lived in New Orleans, Montana, Virginia and Massachusetts.

== Biography ==
Bauer received her BA in journalism from Temple University. She received her MFA in Poetry from the University of Massachusetts Amherst's MFA Program for Poets & Writers.

She has taught at the University of Nebraska–Lincoln since 1994, where she serves as Coordinator of Creative Writing and as a reader for Prairie Schooner. Bauer was also the recipient of the Sorenson Award for Distinguished Teaching in the Humanities.

Bauer has been published in DoubleTake, Poetry, South Dakota Review, Michigan Quarterly Review, Southern Poetry Review, New Orleans Review, and elsewhere.

== Awards ==
While at University of Massachusetts Amherst, Bauer won the Academy of American Poets Prize. Her other awards include an Individual Artist's Grant from the Virginia Commission for the Arts, a Diggs Teaching Scholar Award and Women's Research Institute Grant from Virginia Tech, the Irene Leache Poetry Prize, a Nebraska Arts Council Award, and fellowships from the Virginia Center for the Creative Arts. She also won the 1999 Snail's Pace Press Chapbook Competition. In 2015, she was the recipient of the Society of Midland Authors' Award for Poetry for her book Nowhere All at Once.

== Books ==
- Where You've Seen Her (Pennywhistle Press, 1993)
- The House Where I've Never Lived (Anabiosis P, 1993)
- The Women at the Well (Portals Press, 1997)
- Field Guide to the Ineffable: Poems on Marcel Duchamp
- Beholding Eye (Custom Words, 2006)
- Umpteen Ways of Looking at a Possum: Creative and Critical Responses to Everette Maddox (Xavier Review Press, Fall 2006).
- Retreats and Recognitions (Lost Horse Press, 2007)
- Nowhere All at Once (Stephen F. Austin University Press, 2014)
- The Women at the Well (Stephen F. Austin University Press, forthcoming 2016)
