= Sophie B. Wright Charter School =

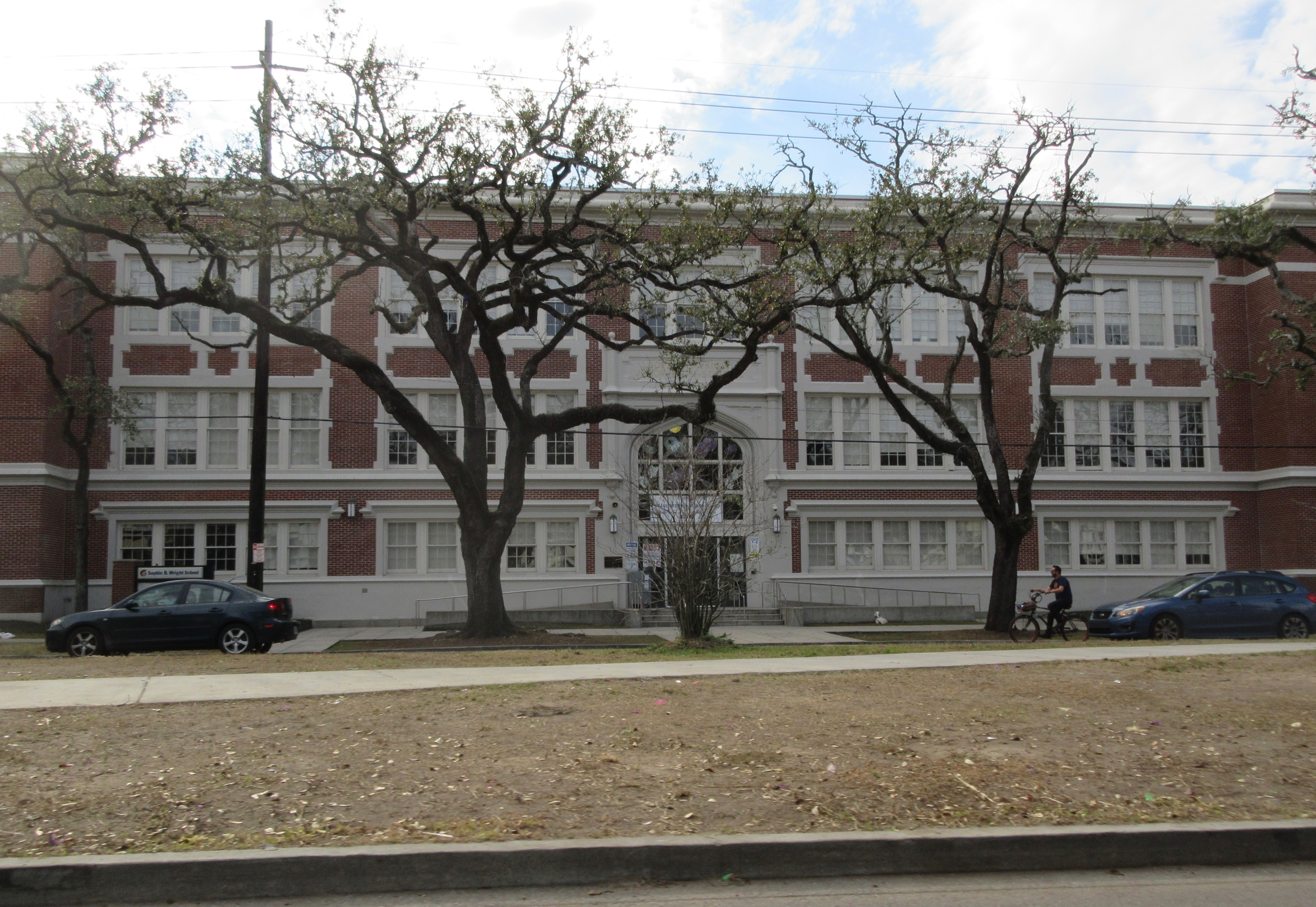
- 1426 Napoleon Ave; New Orleans, Louisiana 70115; United States

Information
- Type: Public; Charter school
- Established: 2007
- School district: Recovery School District
- Faculty: 29.00 (on FTE basis)
- Grades: 6 to 12
- Enrollment: 420 (2022–23)
- Student to teacher ratio: 14.48
- Colors: Blue and Gold
- Athletics: LHSAA
- Sports: Basketball (Boys Varsity); Football (Boys Varsity); Track and Field (Boys); Track and Field (Girls); Volleyball (Girls Varsity)
- Mascot: Warriors
- Website: Sophie B. Wright Charter School website

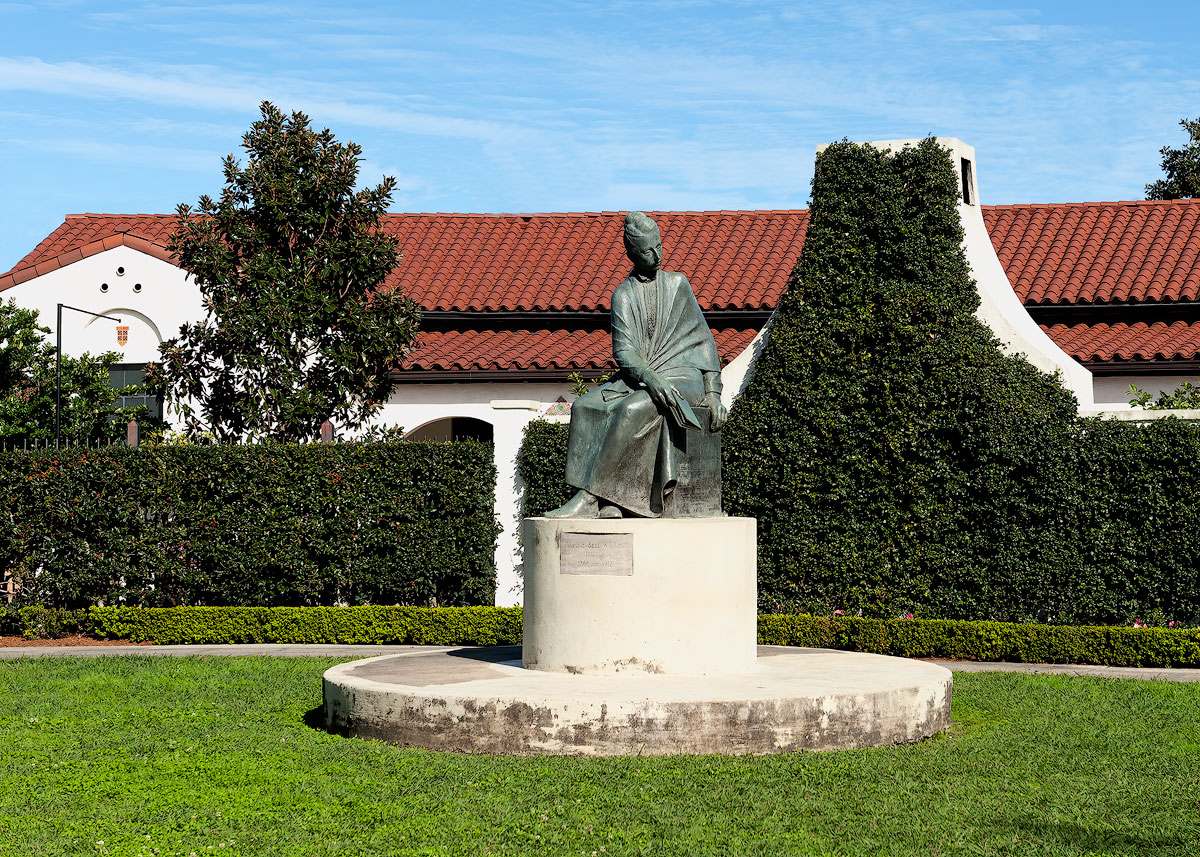
Sophie B. Wright statue, New Orleans

Sophie B. Wright Charter School is a charter high school and middle school in New Orleans, Louisiana. It is a part of the Recovery School District and was named after Sophie B. Wright.

== History ==
Sophie B. Wright Charter School opened in 2007 as part of the Recovery School District. It serves students in grades 6-12.

Beginning in 2013 James Weldon Johnson Elementary School in Carrollton temporarily served as space for Wright. In 2016 the renovations at Wright's permanent building were completed and Wright moved back in.

== Athletics ==
Wright Charter School athletics competes in the LHSAA.

The Sophie B. Wright Warriors participate in boys basketball, football, boys track and field, girls track and field and volleyball.
