= Oak Street (New Orleans) =

Historic street in Louisiana, U.S.

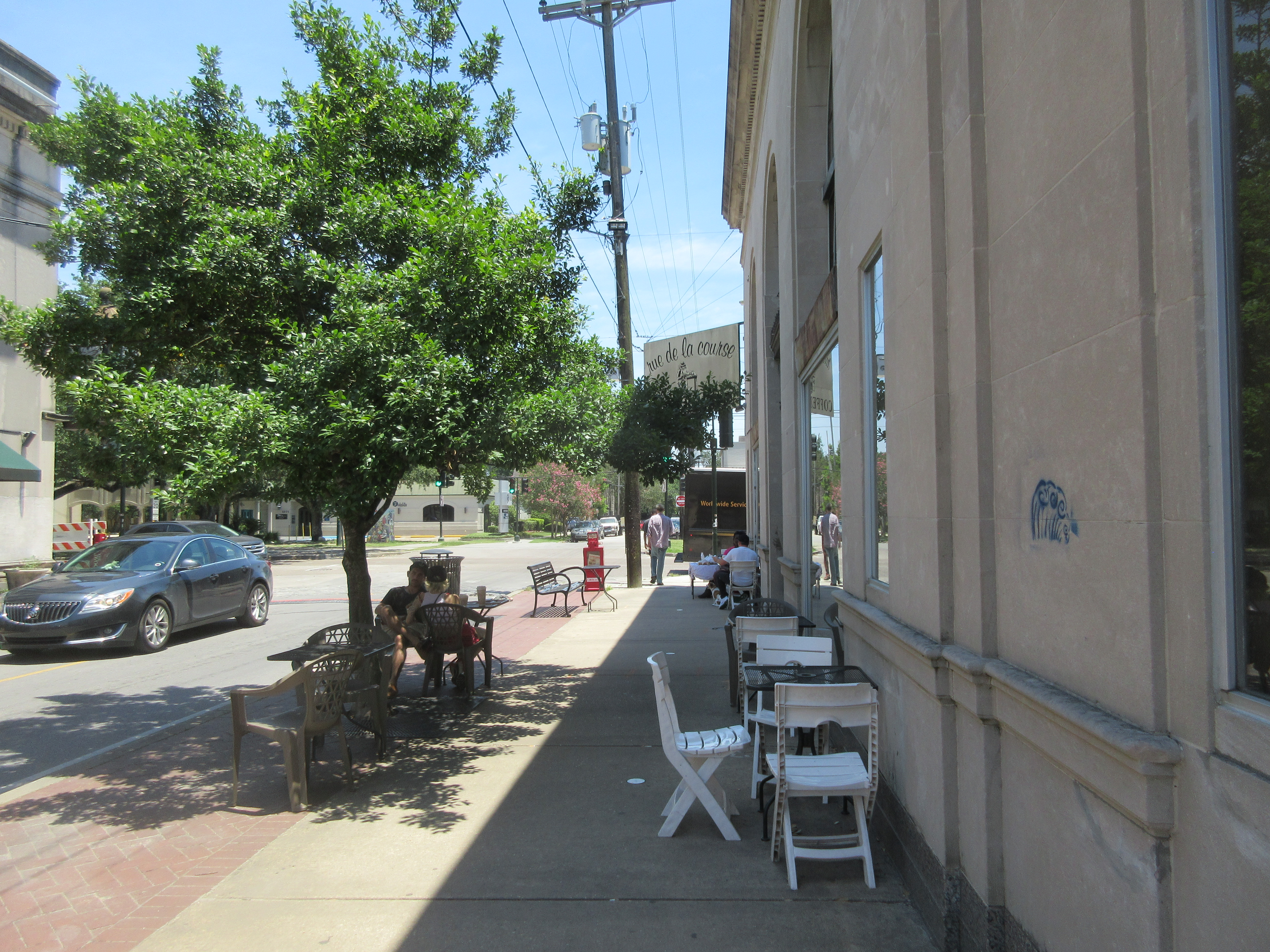
- Oak Street sidewalk (2021)

- Location within Louisiana
- Location: Carrollton, Louisiana, U.S.
- Coordinates: 29°56′52.09″N 90°7′48.56″W
- From: Leake Avenue
- To: Broadway Street

Oak Street is a historic street located in the Carrollton neighborhood of Uptown New Orleans.

The section of the street from Carrollton Avenue to Leake Avenue was thoroughly renovated as part of a government-funded revitalization project in 2009. The street had long housed some of the city's more renowned nightclubs, restaurants, shops and cafes, such as the Maple Leaf Bar, Jacque-Imo's Cafe, and Rue de la Course. The post-Hurricane Katrina renovations led to the emergence of a number of new businesses and venues.

Its variety of eateries and boutiques, combined with its proximity to the South Carrollton Avenue streetcar line, have made this stretch of Oak Street a popular destination for locals and tourists alike. It has also become a common location for many of the film and television shoots that have led to the city of New Orleans being nicknamed "Hollywood South," following a series of industry-geared tax breaks. Oak Street also plays host to the annual Oak Street Po' Boy Festival and serves as the base for the Mid-Summer Mardi Gras parade every summer.
