= Abramson Sci Academy =

Location
- 5552 Read Blvd. New Orleans, Louisiana 70127; United States; 30.03°N 89.97°W

Information
- School type: Public Charter
- Established: 2008
- Grades: 9-12
- Gender: Co-ed
- Campus type: Urban
- Colors: Red, white, and blue
- Athletics: LHSAA
- Mascot: Commodore
- Team name: Commodores
- Website: asa.collegiateacademies.org

Abramson Sci Academy is a high school in the New Orleans East area of New Orleans, United States. The school is a charter school and has an open admission system.

== Management principles ==
The school uses long school days, analyzes individual test results carefully, and splits students into groups of ability within each classroom. Cindy Chang of the Times Picayune said that these methods are "not uncommon elsewhere." The school gives constant boosts of self-esteem to students in order to replicate boosts of self-esteem that wealthier children get in their houses, and it also gives individual attention to students; Chang said that these methods "se[t] the school apart". Chang said that the school "dole[s] out liberally" positive reinforcement for academic achievement and also "qualities like helping others," and that the praise, given on a daily basis from teachers, and the "celebration" assembly, held every week, "convince students that they can be the first in their families to go to college, if only they work hard." Wendy Kopp of The Atlantic said that, at the school, there is "required rigorous coursework, an intense culture of character-building, and an all-out effort by teachers[...]"

The school uses specialized vocabulary, referring to all students as "scholars" and teachers ask students to "spark," or to visibly show enthusiasm and energy, and to "track," or look at a person who is speaking. The school hosts weekly seminars on the importance of using formal speech and what clothes one should wear to a job interview. Chang says that the school also discusses plans to attend universities in an "unrelenting" manner. The school assigns individual groups of students to a faculty member for all four years as part of its "advisory" system. Chang said that the system "ensures that each child has a surrogate parent at the school and helps to inculcate the values and behavioral norms associated with the college-bound upper middle class."

Marcovitz said that the most successful teachers, during their first years, work 12 hours per day, for sixty hours per week. The school pays its teachers 20% higher than the average pay in the Recovery School District, partly due to the long working hours. Teachers publicly post their telephone numbers in their classrooms, and they take telephone calls from students until 9:30 p.m.

== History ==
The school opened in the 2008–2009 school year at grade nine. As of March 2008 the school's location had not yet been decided, but possible locations were East New Orleans and Gentilly. The school was originally named New Orleans Charter Science and Mathematics Academy which was similar to another New Orleans high school, New Orleans Charter Science and Mathematics High School (SciHigh). Sci Academy was modeled after SciHigh. Most New Orleans area charter schools which were opening at the time started with students younger than high school age, and then added grades as the students advanced and grew older. Ben Marcovitz, then 28 years old, founded the school. Marcovitz, a graduate of Yale University, had previously taught at Sci High. He also previously taught at Saint Mary's Academy.

Originally the school used a standard curriculum for a 9th grade level in American schools. It later concluded that its students needed to develop additional reading skills, so it added a literacy program, and according to principal Ben Marcovitz, the curriculum "basically changed over a weekend." The school stopped assigning students to read novels such as Lord of the Flies, and began extra grammar and writing classes. The school offered courses in fluency and phonics.

In 2008–2009, the average 9th grader had a 4th grade reading level. Average reading levels improved by 3.5 grades in the span of less than one year. At that point, the school's scores ranked as the third best in New Orleans and the best in the Recovery School District for Louisiana state English language arts examinations. Between 2009 and 2010 the School Performance Score increased by 7.6 points. In the 2009–2010 school year the school had the highest Graduate Exit Exam (GEE) scores in the RSD and the third highest in the city; two academically selective schools, Benjamin Franklin High School and Lusher Charter School, received higher GEE scores. 80% of the Sci Academy students received "basic" or higher in the English language arts section. 88% scored "basic" or higher in mathematics. 43% achieved "advanced" or "mastery" in mathematics. 19% of the students each at Walter L. Cohen High School and John McDonogh Senior High School received "basic" or higher in the English language arts section.. In 2010 Sci Academy was the highest performing non-selective public high school in New Orleans.

During 2010, most teachers were young White Americans who are not from Louisiana. Most teachers were in their 20s or their early 30s and many had served in Teach for America, and many had graduated from prestigious universities such as Harvard University, University of California Berkeley, and Yale University.

In September 2010, Oprah Winfrey presented a $1 million check from the Oprah's Angel Network to the school principal, Ben Marcovitz. Sci Academy was one of six schools to receive $1 million checks from Oprah on that occasion. In October 2010, parents of children with disabilities filed a lawsuit against the school, saying that the school discriminated against students with disabilities, with the Southern Poverty Law Center representing the families.

Also in September 2010, about 85% of the students were eligible for free or reduced price lunches. As of November 2010 almost 90% of students were eligible. During the same period, students in special education made up 15-20% of the students at Sci Academy, while the New Orleans public school average was 12%. In 2010, despite an increase in the school's reputation, it had not experienced having a waiting list or finding an increase in academic ability in incoming freshmen. As of early November 2010, the school had remaining openings for ninth grade students. Cindy Chang of the Times Picayune said "Administrators quickly refute the notion that they are "creaming" the top students and denying admission to others" and that the school says that it takes "anyone who comes through the door [...] including special-needs students".

In November 2010, the school had 225 students in the ninth, tenth, and eleventh grades. As of 2010, the majority of students are from Eastern New Orleans and Gentilly. The school has students from other areas in New Orleans. Residents of New Orleans, post-Hurricane Katrina, can choose schools regardless of where they live in the city.

Also in November 2010, Cindy Chang of the Times Picayune said "As a rule, students do not enter Sci Academy any better-prepared than their counterparts at Carver, Clark, Cohen, John McDonogh or Sarah T. Reed. Most are tragically behind, with years of catching up to do in the 20-month span before they sit for the GEE." As of the same year, the incoming freshmen came to school with even fewer academic skills than the school's first class of incoming freshmen. 41% of incoming freshmen, a plurality, had the reading levels of fourth grade or below, and 9% had first grade reading levels. 41% had reading levels from the fifth grade to the eighth grade levels, and 8% of students read at grade level or above. Chang added that "Students bring with them the same set of social ills -- single-parent homes, violence-plagued neighborhoods, poverty-related health problems -- found at other urban high schools." Cindy Chang of the Times Picayune also said that "teenagers sit bolt upright in their seats -- no surreptitious napping here -- and getting good grades is considered cool." According to Macovitz, as paraphrased by Chang, fights become more infrequent "once the faculty convinces new students that they are safe at school and do not need to prove their toughness."

== Campus ==
At its founding, the school was located in a set of modular buildings on Dwyer Road. In the summer of 2010, the school moved to modular buildings on the former Marion Abramson High School campus on Read Avenue in New Orleans East. During that year, Cindy Chang of the Times Picayune said that the school hallway coverings are "makeshift." As of 2010, when a strong rain occurs, the hallway coverings cannot prevent flooding and classes are delayed. The Abramson campus property is adjacent to the campus of the Sarah T. Reed Elementary School. The school later built its permanent campus on the former Marion Abramson High School campus on Read Avenue.

== School uniforms ==
The school has school uniforms consisting of polo shirts and khaki pants.

== Athletics ==
Abramson Sci Academy competes as the alias “Abramson Commodores” in athletics, and competes in the LHSAA.
