= List of charter schools in Louisiana =

The following is a list of charter schools in Louisiana (including networks of such schools) grouped by parish.

== Avoyelles Parish ==
- Avoyelles Public Charter School
- Louisiana School for the Agricultural Sciences
- Red River Charter Academy

== Caddo Parish ==
- AMIkids Caddo
- Linwood Public Charter School
- Magnolia School of Excellence
- Pathways in Education - North Market

== Calcasieu Parish ==
- Lake Charles Charter Academy
- Lake Charles College Prep
- Southwest Louisiana Charter School

== Concordia Parish ==
- Delta Charter School

== East Baton Rouge Parish ==
- Advantage Charter Academy
- Arlington Preparatory Academy
- Basis Baton Rouge
- Baton Rouge Center for Visual and Performing Arts
- Baton Rouge University Preparatory Elementary School
- Children's Charter School
- Collegiate Academy
- Community School for Apprenticeship Learning
- Dalton Charter School
- Democracy Prep Baton Rouge Charter School
- Forest Heights Academy of Excellence
- GEO (Next Generation, Prep Academy, Prep Mid City)
- Glen Oaks Middle School
- Idea Schools (Bridge, Innovation, University Prep)
- Impact Charter Elementary School
- Inspire Charter Academy
- J.K. Haynes Elementary Charter School
- Kenilworth Science & Technology Charter School
- Louisiana Key Academy
- Louisiana Virtual Charter Academy
- Madison Preparatory Academy
- Mentorship STEM Academy
- South Baton Rouge Charter Academy
- University View Academy

== East Feliciana Parish ==
- Slaughter Community Charter School

== Jefferson Parish ==
- Athlos Academy of Jefferson Parish
- Dr. John Ochsner Discovery Health Sciences Academy
- Jefferson Chamber Foundation Academy
- Jefferson Rise Charter School
- Kenner Discovery Health Sciences Academy
- Laureate Academy Charter School
- Young Audiences Charter School

== Lafayette Parish ==
- Acadiana Renaissance Charter Academy (Youngsville, Louisiana)
- Willow Charter Academy (Lafayette, Louisiana)
- Lafayette Renaissance Charter Academy (Lafayette, Louisiana)
- Lafayette Renaissance Charter High School (Lafayette, Louisiana)
- Lafayette Renaissance Charter Middle School (coming August 2025) (Lafayette, Louisiana)

== Lafourche Parish ==
- Bayou Community Academy Charter School
- MAX Charter School
- Virtual Academy of Lafourche

== Lincoln Parish ==
- Lincoln Preparatory School

== Morehouse Parish ==
- Beekman Charter School

== Orleans Parish ==
- Abramson Sci Academy
- Akili Academy of New Orleans
- Arise Academy
- Arthur Ashe Charter School
- Audubon Charter School (Gentilly, Uptown)
- Benjamin Franklin Elementary Mathematics & Science School
- Benjamin Franklin High School
- Bricolage Academy
- Dr. Martin Luther King Charter School for Science Tech
- Edward Hynes Charter School
- Einstein Charter Schools (Charter Middle, Sarah T. Reed, Sherwood Forest, Village de L'Est)
- Elan Academy Charter School
- Encore Academy
- Esperanza Charter School
- Fannie C. Williams Charter School
- Firstline Live Oak
- Foundation Preparatory School
- G.W. Carver High School
- Harriet Tubman Charter School
- Homer A. Plessy Community School
- IDEA Schools (Oscar Dunn)
- InspireNOLA (42, Alice M. Harte, Andrew H. Wilson, Dwight D. Eisenhower, Edna Karr, Eleanor McMain, McDonogh 35, Pierre Capdau)
- International High School of New Orleans
- International School of Louisiana
- James A. Singleton Charter School
- Joseph A. Craig Charter School
- KIPP New Orleans (Believe, Booker T. Washington, Central City, East, Frederick A. Douglass, John F. Kennedy, Leadership, Memorial)
- Lafayette Academy
- Lake Area New Tech Early College High School
- Lake Forest Elementary Charter School
- Langston Hughes Charter Academy
- Lanier Elementary School
- Lawrence D. Crocker College Prep
- L.B. Landry-O.P. Walker College & Career Preparatory High School
- Living School
- Livingston Collegiate Academy
- Lycée Français de la Nouvelle-Orléans
- Martin Behrman Elementary School
- Mary Bethune Elementary School of Literature & Technology
- Mary D. Coghill Charter School
- Mildred Osborne Charter School
- Morris Jeff Community School
- Nelson Elementary School
- The Net Charter High School I/II
- New Harmony High Institute
- New Orleans Charter Science & Mathematics High School
- New Orleans Military & Maritime Academy
- Noble Minds
- Opportunities Academy
- Paul Habans Charter School
- Phillis Wheatley Community School
- ReNew Schools (Dolores T. Aaron, Schaumburg, Scitech)
- Robert Russa Moton Elementary School
- Rooted School
- Rosenwald Collegiate Academy
- Samuel J. Green Charter School
- Sophie B. Wright Institute of Academic Excellence
- Success Preparatory Academy
- Walter L. Cohen High School
- Warren Easton Charter High School
- The Willow School (Louisiana)
- Wilson Charter School

== Ouachita Parish ==
- New Vision Learning Academy

== Plaquemines Parish ==
- Belle Chasse Academy
- Iberville Charter Academy

== Richland Parish ==
- Delhi Charter School

== St. James Parish ==
- Greater Grace Charter Academy

== St. Landry Parish ==
- J.S. Clark Leadership Academy
- École Saint-Landry

== St. Mary Parish ==
- V.B. Glencoe Charter School

== Union Parish ==
- D'Arbonne Woods Charter School
- Downsville Community Charter School

== Washington Parish ==
- Northshore Charter School
