= Booker T. Washington High School (New Orleans, Louisiana) =

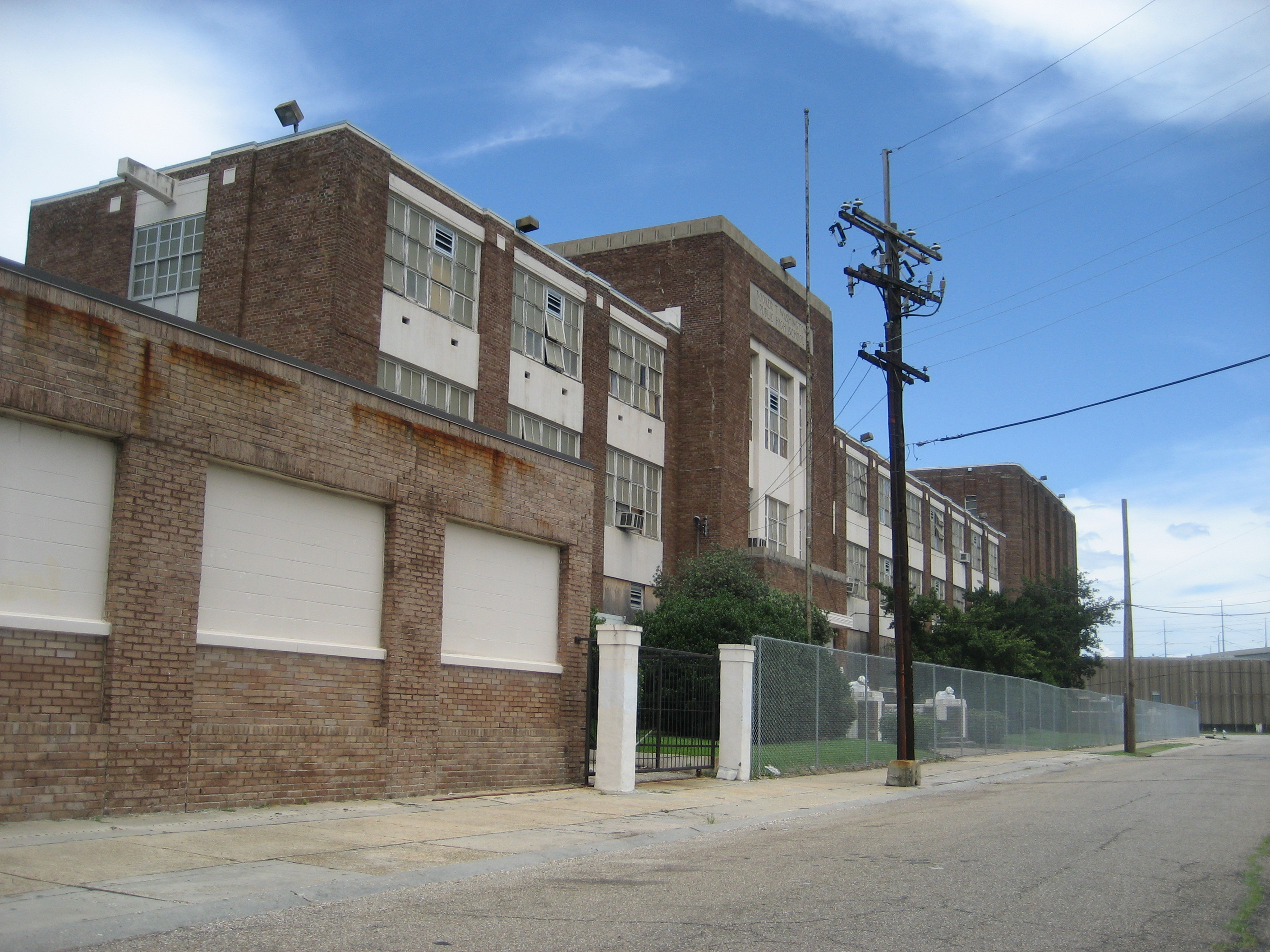

Location
- 1201 South Roman St. New Orleans, Louisiana 70125; United States
- 29°57′00″N 90°05′21″W

Information
- Type: Public charter high school
- Opened: 1942, Reopened 2016
- School district: Orleans Parish School Board
- Teaching staff: 40.00 (FTE)
- Enrollment: 637 (2023–2024)
- Student to teacher ratio: 15.92
- Campus type: Inner-city
- Colors: Crimson and white
- Team name: Lions
- Website: bookertwashington.kippneworleans.org

Booker T. Washington High School (Booker T.) is a public charter high school in New Orleans, in the U.S. state of Louisiana.

== History ==
=== Original Booker T. Washington High School (1942–2005) ===
Construction of the school was completed in August 1942 at 1201 South Roman St. In September 1942, it opened as the first vocational school and the first public high school serving African Americans in Uptown, New Orleans. At the time, the school's enrollment was 1,600. Lawrence Crooker became the first principal.

In 1949, the auditorium held celebrations of and a concert by Louis Armstrong, who was reigning as "King" of the Zulu Social Aid & Pleasure Club, the leading African American New Orleans Mardi Gras krewe during the segregation era.

The students who were zoned to Booker T. were mostly from the B.W. Cooper and CJ Pete's housing developments. After desegregation, students were bused to nearby Alcee Fortier High School. This led to a decrease in Booker T. Washington's student population. By the end of the 1970s, the schools student body decreased to only 750, half of whom were female. The building also began to deteriorate; due to leaks, mold formed under the bathroom sinks. Windows, pipes and doors were also in need of repair, but the Orleans Parish School Board didn't have enough funds for a full renovation.

In the 1980s, violence began to take place on school grounds as crack-cocaine dealers from the Calliope Projects began selling drugs on school grounds. The school was in the middle of countless shootouts and the building was hit by stray bullets. In 1992, Michael Lach and Michael Loverude of the Christian Science Monitor stated, "Based on test scores, dropout rates, and socioeconomic status of the students, the schools we taught in were two of the worst high schools in the country – Booker T. Washington and Alcee Fortier high schools. Given these circumstances, both schools do a fine job, but students leave deserving so much more."

In 2003, the school's enrollment was at an all-time low of 530 with most of its students attending Walter L. Cohen High School. Before Hurricane Katrina, it was labeled as a "dropout factory." The last graduate class was in 2005. The school closed on August 28, 2005 due to Hurricane Katrina.

=== Post-Original Booker T. Washington closure ===
The school officially closed its doors in 2005. After Hurricane Katrina, thieves removed architectural detailing and tens of thousands of dollars' worth of copper. With better maintenance and security from looters, preservationists contended, the historic school could have been restored for less than it would cost to replace it. Plans were made to save the building from being torn down, but due to its location and condition, a motion was passed to demolish the building while saving the school's old auditorium.

After an extended demolition from 2011 to 2016, the old auditorium was incorporated into a new building for New Orleans College Prep offices, a charter school operator of multiple schools in New Orleans. The school building was listed on the National Register of Historic Places from July 17, 2002 until it was removed on June 12, 2017.

=== KIPP Booker T. Washington High School (2016–2019) ===
In 2016, KIPP New Orleans Schools, a charter school operator, opened KIPP Booker T. Washington High School in the Carter G. Woodson building at 2514 Third Street in New Orleans. In 2019, the school moved into a new building constructed on the same site of the original Booker T. Washington High School.

=== Booker T. Washington High School (2019–present) ===
In 2019, when the school moved into the new building built on the site of the original Booker T. Washington High School, the school dropped the word KIPP from the name of the school. The school was still managed by KIPP New Orleans Schools after the move to the new location.

== Athletics ==
Booker T. Washington High athletics competes in the LHSAA.

=== Championships ===
Football championships

- (3) State Championships: 1946, 1949, 1950

== Notable alumni ==
- Joseph Bouie, Jr., member of the Louisiana House of Representatives for District 97 in Orleans Parish since 2014; former faculty member and administrator at Southern University at New Orleans
- Percy Robert Miller, rapper, businessman, record producer, philanthropist and former basketball player
- Bruce Seals, former NBA player

== See also ==
- List of things named after Booker T. Washington
