= Sarah Reed =

Sarah Reed may refer to:

- Sarah A. Reed (1838–1934), writer and philanthropist
- Sarah Reed (footballer) (born 1980), English footballer
- Sarah Reed (musician), American musician, singer, and guitarist
- Sarah Reed (prisoner), British prisoner who died while on remand
- Sarah Towles Reed, American teacher and labor activist

== See also ==
- Sarah T. Reed High School, New Orleans, Louisiana
- Sarah Reid (disambiguation)
