= Eleanor McMain Secondary School =

High school in New Orleans

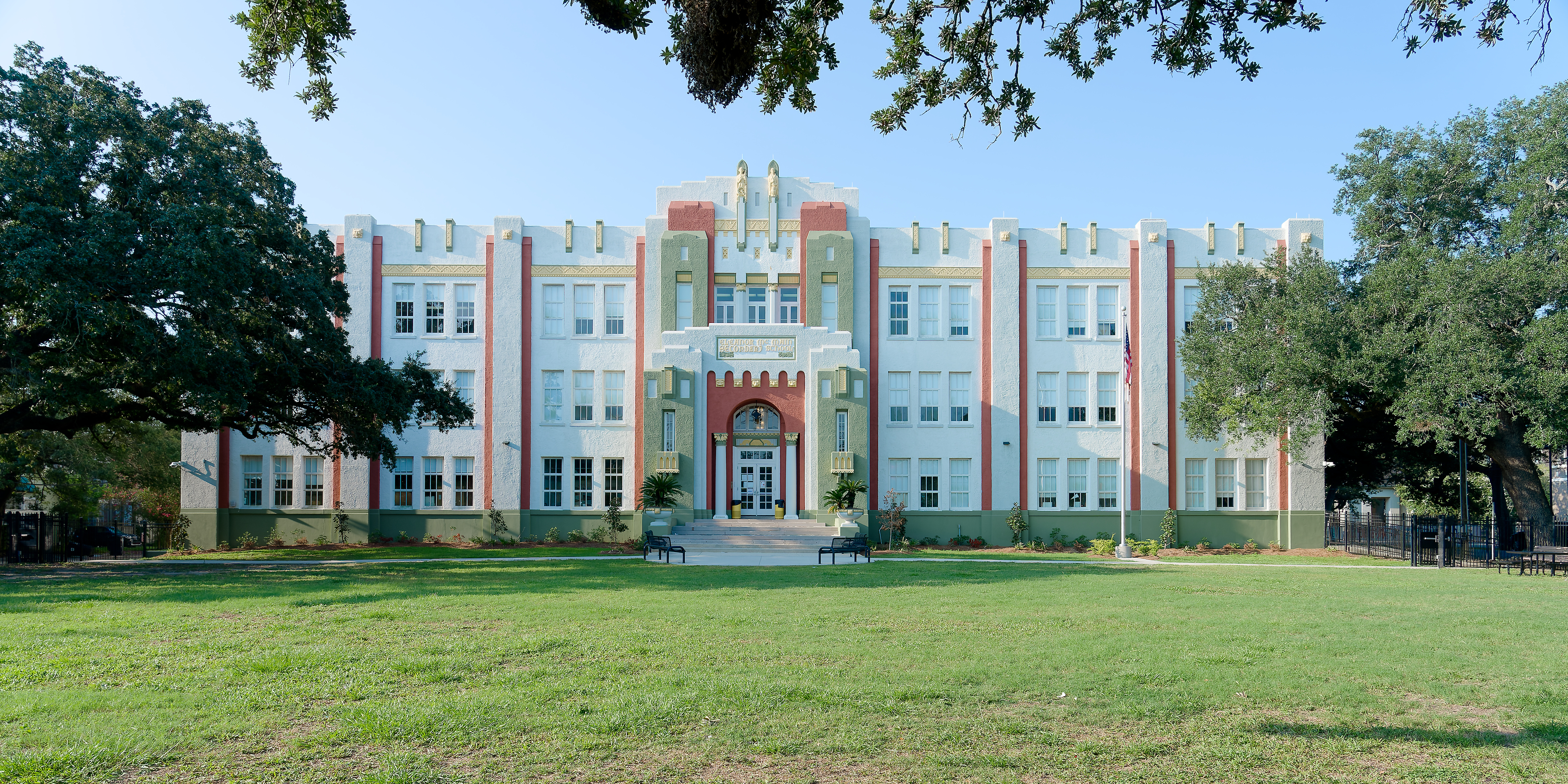

Location
- 5712 South Claiborne Avenue; New Orleans, (Orleans Parish), Louisiana 70125; United States; 29.9422°N 90.1117°W

Information
- Type: Public high school
- Established: 1932
- School district: Orleans Parish School Board
- Principal: Melanie Moore
- Staff: 49.00 (FTE)
- Grades: 9-12
- Enrollment: 863 (2021-22)
- Student to teacher ratio: 17.61
- Colors: Black and gold
- Mascot: Mustangs
- Website: School website

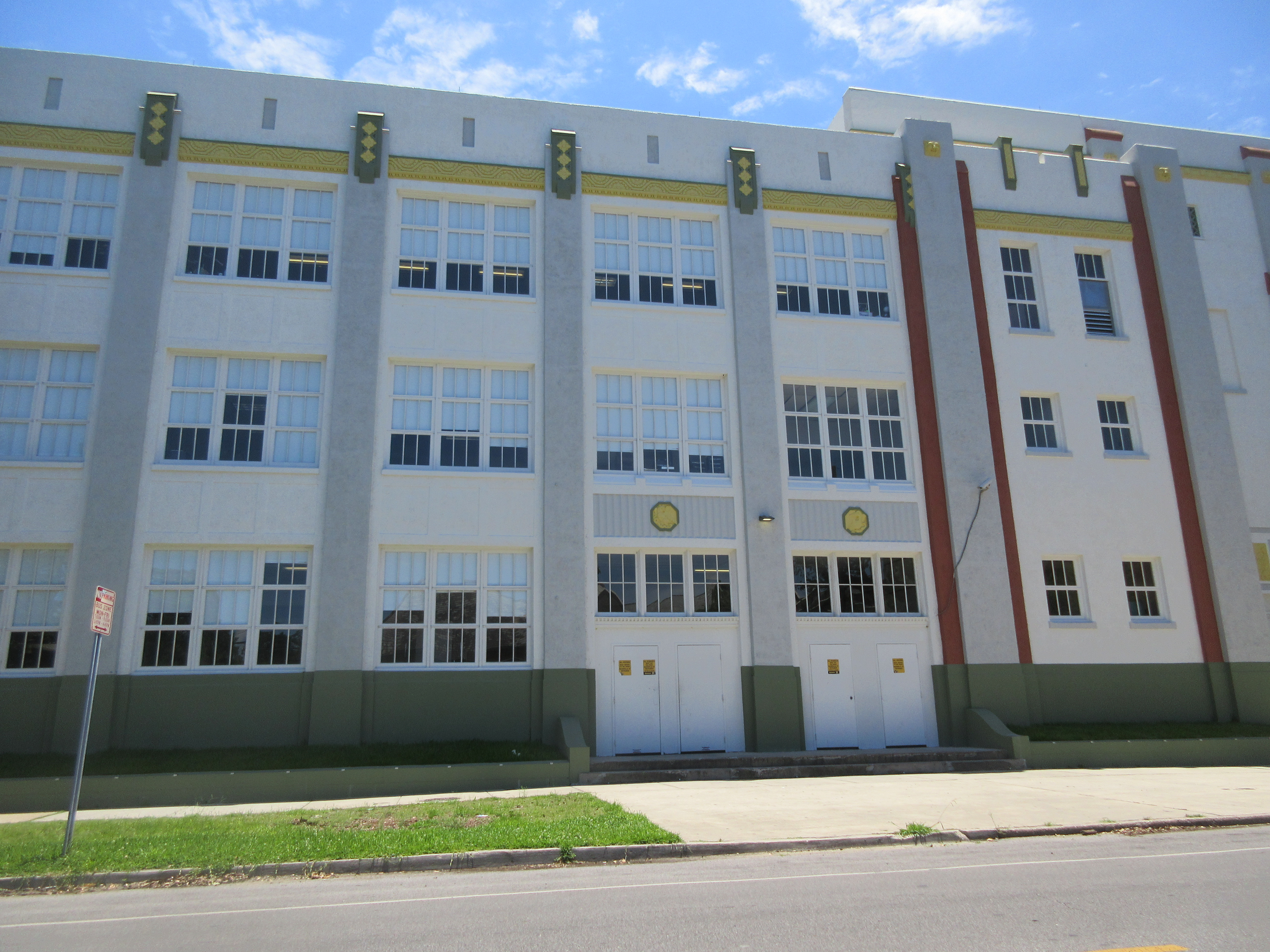
McMain side entrance on Nashville Ave.

Eleanor Laura McMain Secondary School is a charter secondary school in Uptown New Orleans, Louisiana. It is operated by the Inspire Charter Network.

== History ==
The school was named in honor of New Orleans social activist Eleanor McMain. It opened in 1932 originally as an all-girls school. It became a coeducational junior high school in 1952, and a coeducational secondary with a magnet program in 1974. It later became an all-magnet school.

Students and Alumni refer to the schools appearance as "The Birthday Cake" because of its square shape and candle-like pillars. The school is five blocks away from the former Alcee Fortier High School, now the Lusher Charter School secondary campus.

As Hurricane Katrina was about to hit, the New Orleans Regional Transit Authority (RTA) designated McMain as a place where people could receive transportation to the Louisiana Superdome, a shelter of last resort.

After Hurricane Katrina, McMain remained under the Orleans Parish School Board and later the Recovery School District.

In 2017, it was announced that McMain was going to become a charter school and retain the same name under the Inspire Charter Network starting with the 2018 school year.

== Athletics ==
McMain Secondary School athletics competes in the LHSAA.

== Notable alumni ==
- Hong Chau, Vietnamese American actress. Attended McMain in the 1990s
- Lil Wayne (Dwayne Michael Carter Jr.), rapper, singer, songwriter. Attended McMain in the 1990s for two years before transferring to Marion Abramson High School
- Matthew Dorsett, NFL defensive back. Class of 1991.
- Jason Marsalis, jazz musician. Class of 1995.
- Darrion Weems, NFL offensive tackle. Attended but did not graduate from McMain. (displaced by Hurricane Katrina)
