= Edna Karr High School =

Location
- 4400 General Meyer Ave; Algiers; New Orleans, Orleans Parish, Louisiana; United States

Information
- School type: Public Charter
- Established: 1964
- Status: open
- School board: InspireNOLA
- School district: Orleans Parish
- Principal: Tomika Washington
- Teaching staff: 75.33 (FTE)
- Grades: 9–12
- Enrollment: 1,131 (2023–2024)
- Student to teacher ratio: 15.01
- Campus type: Urban
- Colors: Purple and gold
- Slogan: Second 2 None
- Fight song: We Are The Cougars!
- Athletics: LHSAA
- Athletics conference: 5A District 9
- Sports: 7× LHSSA State Football Championships (1993, 2012, 2016, 2017, 2018, 2019, 2024); 8× LHSSA State Track and Field State Championships (Boys & Girls) (1996, 2003, 2013, 2015, 2016, 2017, 2018, 2019)
- Mascot: Cougar
- Nickname: Cougars
- Accreditation: Southern Association of Colleges and Schools, Louisiana Department of Education

Edna Karr High School is a public, open enrollment, coeducational charter school in New Orleans, Louisiana, United States. The school is a college preparatory high school and is a part of InspireNOLA Charter Schools and the New Orleans Public School System (NOPS). Edna Karr High School is located in Algiers, a small community of New Orleans located on the west bank of the Mississippi River in Orleans Parish.

== History ==
The school began operation in 1964 as a junior high school. It was named after Edna Karr, an educator who served as a teacher and administrator in the Algiers community. About 18 months after the (mid-school-year) opening of the new junior high, Hurricane Betsy struck as the 1965-66 school year was starting. Local schools were closed for several days, in part because local electric power had not been restored. In addition, Karr's beautiful gym floor was ruined; blowing rain had pounded in through broken windows, and the inundated wood flooring buckled like an accordion. When school restarted, physical education classes were held outdoors until the floor had been replaced.

Until 1990, Edna Karr operated as a junior high serving grades 7 through 9, with an academic program that included regular education, special education, and gifted education. In May 1990, the Orleans Parish School Board voted to change Edna Karr into a junior/senior high magnet school. This was at the behest of community activists. As a result, significant changes took place: upper grade levels, new courses, and high school traditions were added. In addition, policies and procedures were written for magnet school clientele. Starting with the 1991 school year, grades ten, eleven and twelve would be added over the next three years and the school graduated its first senior class in May 1993.

In the years since Karr became a high school, it completed its Southern Association of Colleges and Schools (SACS) 10-Year Update in 1998. In 2000 and again in 2005, Edna Karr earned the National Blue Ribbon Schools of Excellence Recognition.

All of this changed in the autumn of 2005 after Hurricane Katrina. With the creation of the Algiers Charter Schools Association, Edna Karr was one of the first six public schools to reopen in the city of New Orleans (December 15, 2005). Edna Karr reopened as a senior high charter school serving grades 9 through 12. Under the ACSA charter, Edna Karr once again has open enrollment and is therefore open to all students who live in Orleans Parish.

Edna Karr will complete a brand new campus by October 2019. The project is estimated to cost $48.9 million.

== Student demographics ==
As of the 2015-16 school year, approximately 95% of the student population is African-American, and approximately 83% of the students qualify for free or reduced-price school lunches. Most of the students will be first-generation college students in their families.

In 2015, Edna Karr ranked 2nd best in the New Orleans Parish School District and above 83.1% of high schools in Louisiana in academic performance.

== Athletics ==
Edna Karr athletics competes in the LHSAA.

http://www.14-0productions.com/boys-basketball.html

State Championships
(8) Football: 1993, 2012, 2016, 2017, 2018, 2019, 2024, 2025

(8) Track (Boys & Girls) 1996, 2003, 2013, 2015, 2016, 2017, 2018, 2019

(3) Basketball (Boys) 1994, 1996, 2007

== Marching band ==
Edna Karr's marching band is known as "#TeamBustEmUp" and includes 100+ instrumentalists, dancers (Cougar Dolls), a flag corp, and twirlers. Some notable accomplishments of the band include being highlighted in a documentary on New Orleans, photographed for ESPN's 10th Anniversary of Hurricane Katrina issue, invited to perform in London, England for the city's 2016 New Years Day Parade, and a cameo appearance in Beyoncé's Lemonade visual album. They have also appeared in a 2018 T-Mobile commercial and made an appearance in the 2018 film, Assassination Nation. It is one of the premier bands of New Orleans, often called upon to compete nationwide. On October 5, 2026, the marching band performed during the New Orleans Saints football halftime show featuring Trombone Shorty, celebrating the 20th anniversary of the Saints' return to the Superdome after Hurricane Katrina.

The Marching Cougars' motto is "Second to None".

The band is led by 2004 Edna Karr and 2010 Jackson State University graduate Christopher Herrero who received a key to the city of New Orleans in 2023 along with DJ Hollygrove.

== Notable people ==
- Aaron Anderson (class of 2022), college football wide receiver
- Greg "Tarzan" Davis (class of 2011), television and film actor (Top Gun: Maverick, Grey's Anatomy, Mission: Impossible – Dead Reckoning Part One, Tales from the Hood 2)
- Olaf Fink, state senator for Algiers from 1956 to 1972, also a teacher during that time, including at Edna Karr
- Eric Henderson, (class of 2001), Georgia Tech and NFL defensive end
- Quindell Johnson (class of 2018), NFL safety
- Cornelius Lucas (class of 2009), NFL football player
- Jaylin Lucas (class of 2022), college football player
- Racey McMath (class of 2017), NFL football player
- Bernard Robertson (class of 1996), NFL offensive tackle
- Robert Royal (class of 1997), NFL tight end
- David P. Steiner (class of 1978), CEO Waste Management and as of July 2025, Postmaster General of the United States
- Patrick Surtain (class of 1994), NFL cornerback; father of 2024 NFL Defensive Player of the Year Patrick Surtain II
- Greedy Vance Jr. (class of 2020), NFL cornerback
- Gerald Willis (class of 2014), NFL football player
