= Dr. King Charter School =

Location
- 5300 N. Rocheblave St. New Orleans, Louisiana 70117; United States; 29.9752849°N 90.0172814°W

Information
- School type: Public Charter
- Established: Elementary: 1995, High School: 2009
- Grades: 9-12
- Gender: Co-ed
- Campus type: Urban
- Colors: Red, black, silver and green
- Athletics: LHSAA
- Team name: Jaguars
- Website: http://www.drkingcharterschool.org

Dr. King Charter School, full name Dr. Martin Luther King Jr. Charter School for Science and Technology, is a K–12 charter school, in the Lower 9th Ward, in the 9th Ward, New Orleans, Louisiana, United States. It is the only public high school located in the Lower 9th Ward.

== History ==
The school was named after Martin Luther King Jr. The elementary school opened in 1995 and the school expanded in 2009 to include a high school.

In the 2006–2007 school year, King students attended the former Harney School, as King had been damaged by Hurricane Katrina in 2005. At that time, over half of the 450 students attending Harney had attended King pre-Katrina. King, which re-opened in 2007, was the first Lower 9th Ward school to do so after Hurricane Katrina. In 2007, Principal Doris Hicks said that over 600 students registered to attend King in the 2007–2008 school year.

In 2009, Darren Simon of the Times Picayune said that Dr. King Charter is "one of the city's higher performing schools without admission criteria", and that it is "seen as a symbol of rebirth in the Lower 9th Ward".

A February 2009, the State of Louisiana count of the school stated that the school had fewer than 5% special education students, below the 5% number recommended in a state board of education guideline and the 12.3 Recovery School District average. In June of that year, Hicks said that the most recent figures sent to the state count the special education population at 6% and that the school is conservative in assigning students special education status, giving them after school tutoring and Saturday school to see if they improve, before labeling them as special education students. The State Authorized Oversight Committee recommended that the school's charter be renewed. In June 2009, the charter was renewed without a plan to increase the numbers of special education students.

On April 5, 2012, classes were canceled so King Charter teachers could travel to the state capitol in Baton Rouge to protest a package of education bills put forth by then Louisiana Governor, Bobby Jindal. Also in 2012, the school graduated its first senior class.

In 2015, the school signed a contract with New Orleans Public Schools, making the school the first to return to the district's authority since Katrina.

On December 10, 2024, the Orleans Parish School Board voted to close Dr. King Charter High School at the conclusion of the 2024-25 school year, citing low enrollment and poor academic performance. The school's K-8 campus will stay open on a contingent, three-year contract. High school students attending Dr. King Charter will receive priority in the school district's ongoing enrollment program for the 2025-26 school year.

== Athletics ==
Dr. King Charter High athletics competes in the LHSAA.
