= Crescent City Schools =

Charter management organization in New Orleans, Louisiana

- Founder: Kate Mehok; Julie Lause
- Type: Public charter school
- Tax ID no.: 27-2811737
- Location: New Orleans, Louisiana
- Revenue: $19,728,008 (2015)

Crescent City Schools (RSD) is a charter management organization (CMO) based in New Orleans, Louisiana. In the fall of 2010, the organization received a Type 5 charter from the state of Louisiana to take over a failing school in New Orleans. In February 2011, Crescent City Schools was assigned to Harriet Tubman, a K-8 school in Orleans Parish, and assumed operations on July 1, 2011. In 2012, the organization was awarded the expanded charter for Akili Academy of New Orleans and the charter for Paul B. Habans Elementary. Habans opened as Paul Habans Charter School in July 2013.

== History ==
The Recovery School District was established in 2003 by the Louisiana Legislature as a means for the state to take over low-performing public schools. Since the devastation of Hurricane Katrina in 2005, the RSD has chartered out all of its schools, and approximately 92% of students in New Orleans attend charter schools. The schools that were not failing stayed under the control of the Orleans Parish School Board, which currently operates 18 schools, most of which are also charters. Once schools are turned around and deemed "not failing," they have the option to return to the Orleans Parish School Board or stay in the RSD. Crescent City Schools operates under the Recovery School District.

== Turnaround ==
Turnaround in public schools is defined as the comprehensive reorganization of low-performing schools. This can involve changes in leadership, curriculum, faculty and staff, and the overall identity and mission of the school. The initial goal of turnaround is to make significant achievement gains within two years. These gains are reflected in test score performances and recognized by rankings such as the School Performance Score (SPS) issued by the Louisiana Department of Education. The long-term goal for turnaround is to transform the schools into high-performance organizations.

== Schools ==
Crescent City Schools currently serves more than 1,800 students in three schools across New Orleans: Harriet Tubman Charter School (PreK-8) in Algiers, Akili Academy (K-8) in the Upper Ninth Ward, and Paul Habans Charter School (PreK-8) in Algiers.

Harriet Tubman Charter School was the first school to be managed by Crescent City Schools in 2011. Temporarily located at 2832 General Meyer Avenue in the Algiers neighborhood on the West Bank of New Orleans, Tubman's permanent home is a historical building that is undergoing renovations as of 2014. The school serves 1100 students in grades PreK-8. It is open enrollment and non-selective; students are accepted at any time as long as there is adequate physical space. Special education professionals and interventionists are provided for high need students. In its first year of operations, Tubman's School Performance Score (SPS) increased by 11.1 points from its last reported score, moving from a 55.5 in 2010 to a 66.6 in 2012. In 2014, Harriet Tubman Charter School 8th graders outperformed the state average in all subject areas: English Language Arts, Math, Science, and Social Studies. In 2015, Tubman became the highest-ranking RSD school on the West Bank, and its SPS improved by more than 18 points, demonstrating the second strongest growth for any K-8 school in the RSD. Tubman also increased the number of students achieving mastery and proficiency on state testing across all testing grades. In addition, 85% of special needs students who qualified for the State's alternate assessment met or exceeded expectations in ELA and math. In 2016, the percentage of Tubman scholars performing at Basic or above in ELA increased to 63%, while the percentage of students performing Mastery or above in Math increased to 33%.

Akili Academy of New Orleans came under Crescent City Schools management in 2012. Akili Academy relocated in July 2013 to the newly restored historic William Frantz school building at 3811 North Galvez Street in the Upper Ninth Ward. The William Frantz site is significant as it was the first site of desegregation in New Orleans where six-year-old Ruby Bridges attended the all-white school on November 14, 1960.

Akili Academy is a Type 5 charter school that began operations in August 2008 with kindergarten and first grade. The school has grown by one grade each year and is now a K-8 school serving 550 students. In the school's first year of operations, only 6% of students were at grade level at the start of the school year. At the end of the first year of instruction, 85% of kindergarteners were at or above grade level and 77% of first grade students were at or above grade level. This type of student achievement and academic growth is almost unprecedented for a school in its first year of operations. By the 2010–2011 school year Akili Academy had grown to a K-3 school and its first class of third graders took the State of Louisiana iLEAP exam, given annually to third and fifth-eighth graders. Over 88% of Akili students performed at or above grade level on the iLEAP, the highest percentage in the entire Recovery School District. Additionally, 45% of students achieved a level of Advanced or Mastery in ELA and Math. For two consecutive seasons (2011 and 2012), Akili Academy had the highest-performing third graders in the Recovery School District on the iLEAP. In 2014, Akili Academy sixth graders were in the Top 10 in the city for scoring Mastery and Advanced in English Language Arts. Akili was the only school in the Recovery School District represented on this list. Between 2014 and 2016, Akili increased the percentage of students reading on or above grade level by 15 percentage points, from 44% of students reading on or above grade level to 59%. Akili Academy is well known throughout the City of New Orleans for its championship winning athletic programs. Akili offers competition sports such as baseball, basketball, cheerleading, football, soccer, softball, track and volleyball to 5-8 grade students. During the 2017-2018 athletic year, the Gators won 11 of 13 New Orleans Charter School Athletic Association City Championships. Scholar athletes, are heavily recruited by local public and private high school athletic programs.

Paul Habans Charter School opened in July 2013 under Crescent City Schools. Formerly Paul B. Habans Elementary School, it is located at 3501 Seine Street in the Algiers neighborhood on the West Bank of New Orleans. Habans serves 932 scholars in grades Pre-K - 8. In 2014, Paul Habans Charter School 6th grade scholars grew 1.37 years in their reading level by the end of the year. In 2016, LEAP scores revealed that Habans improved more than the state average, both in the percent of students scoring Mastery or above, as well as the percent of students scoring Basic or above. Overall, the percentage of students scoring Mastery or above increased from 9.87% in 2015 to 14.67% in 2016.

== Management ==
Crescent City Schools was founded by educators Kate Mehok and Julie Lause. Both were honored by the New Schools Venture Fund in 2013 as Entrepreneurs to Watch for their contributions to public education.
