= Eleanor McMain =

American settlement house worker (1868–1934)

- Born: Eleanor Laura McMain; March 2, 1868; East Baton Rouge Parish, Louisiana, U.S.
- Died: May 12, 1934 (aged 66); New Orleans, Louisiana, U.S.
- Resting place: Magnolia Cemetery, Baton Rouge, Louisiana
- Movement: Settlement

Eleanor Laura McMain (March 2, 1868 – May 12, 1934) was an American settlement house worker and progressive reformer. McMain served as head resident of Kingsley House, the largest and most influential settlement house in the American South, transforming Kingsley House into a focal point of progressive movements in the New Orleans area. Additionally, she furthered women's causes at a time of suffrage.

== Early life and education ==
Of Scottish-Irish Protestant heritage, McMain was born on March 2, 1868, on a farm in East Baton Rouge Parish, Louisiana, along the Amite River, 17 miles from Baton Rouge, Louisiana. Her parents were Jacob West McMain and Jane Josephine McMain (née Walsh). She was known as "Nellie" to family and friends during her youth. As a young girl, the family relocated to Baton Rouge so that her father could serve in administrative posts at Louisiana State University. The family's homestead later became the site of Our Lady of the Lake Sanitarium. Her family valued education and provided young McMain with a private school education. Her parents raised her as an Episcopalian. McMain briefly served as a teacher in Baton Rouge before subsequently relocating to New Orleans to further her training at the Free Kindergarten Association, an Episcopal sponsored effort to provide innovations in pre-school education. The training school of the Free Kindergarten Association combined with the Trinity Church Mission to form Kingsley House.

== Career ==
In 1900, shortly after Kingsley House formed, McMain was appointed director of Kingsley House, a settlement house dedicated to improving integration of poor people into society. It was then located in the Irish Channel section of New Orleans at 1600 Constance Street. Community activist Jane Addams visited New Orleans in 1900, and, so as to prepare for her new role, McMain studied at Addams's two Chicago settlement houses, Hull House and Chicago Center.

Kingsley House progressed rapidly under McMain's leadership. By 1902, McMain reorganized Kingsley House on a nonsectarian basis, and it thereby went from being Episcopalian to having Roman Catholic and Jewish representation on their board. During her tenure, Kingsley House became a community center with a medical clinic, a kindergarten, an adult night school, a library, and the first vocational school in New Orleans. It additionally became a social center with concerts, dances, athletic events, and organized recreation for children. For the vocational school, McMain arranged for use of a building operated by the Orleans Parish School Board. She also established the first public playground in the city of New Orleans.

Self-help and cooperation were among the guiding principles instituted by McMain at Kingsley House. She gave the residents slogans to live by:

- Everything to help and nothing to hinder
- Each for all and all for each
- I must do my part

Jane Addams occasionally visited Kingsley House, as did other representatives from Hull House. In 1912, McMain took a leave of absence from Kingsley House to visit Chicago while recovering from malaria, and renewing her relationship with Addams. At times, Addams referred to Kingsley House as "Little Hull House". Kate M. Gordon and Jean Margaret Gordon who were leading suffragettes in New Orleans at the time, had key rolls in the Women's Club at Kingsley House.

McMain contributed to other causes for civic reform in the city of New Orleans. In 1904, she became president of the local Tenement House Association, and in this role she publicized the findings of the housing survey, resulting in public attention to substandard urban living conditions. In 1905, McMain led a clean-up and education campaign to help eradicate the yellow fever epidemic in the Irish Channel of New Orleans. She became the first president of the Women's League of New Orleans. McMain was a founder of an anti-tuberculosis association in New Orleans. She lobbied the Louisiana State Legislature for child labor laws and, in 1910, achieved passage of Women's League sponsored compulsory education. McMain worked closely with Jean Gordon and Kate Gordon in these endeavors. During her tenure, Kingsley House established a Woodworking Class for the Blind, conducted by an instructor from the Delgado Trade School. It also established the Kingsley House Athletic Association which included swimming lessons for underprivileged people.

McMain trained Red Cross nurses during World War I. It was for a time one of only two schools for nurses aides in the United States. In 1921, McMain helped establish the Tulane University School of Social Work, the fifth oldest institution of its kind in the United States. This was natural in that Tulane University personnel participated in governance of Kingsley House, and their faculty and students worked there. Also that year, she helped prepare the charter of the New Orleans Central Council of Social Agencies, the forerunner of the local Community Chest and later United Way, and served as its president in 1927.

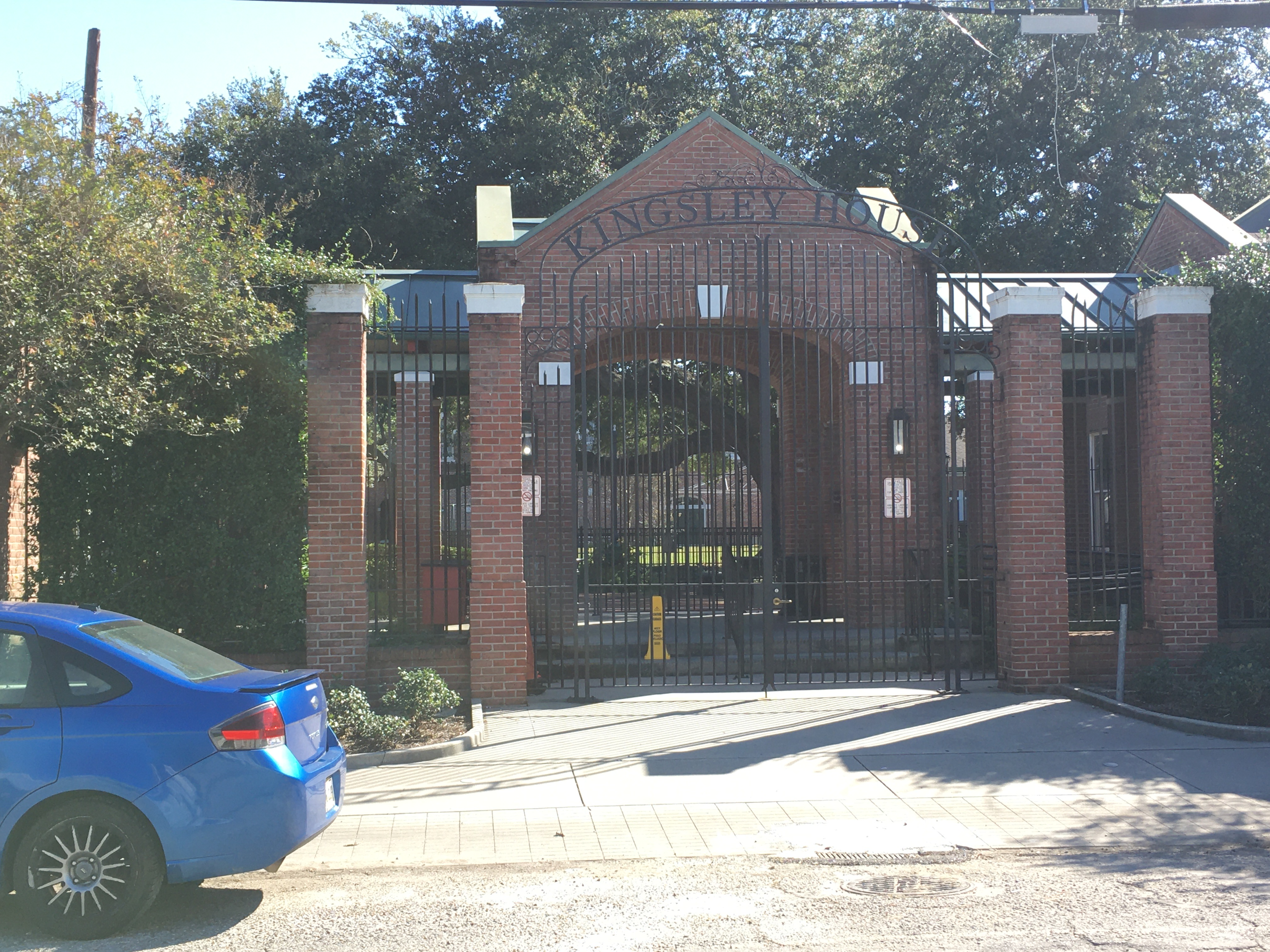
Entrance to Kingsley House in New Orleans, as seen in 2019

Expansion of Kingsley House necessitated fund-raising efforts. McMain organized fund-raising by members of Kingsley House, and she garnered funds from benefactors, most notably New Orleans benefactor Frank Williams who donated $300,000 to the settlement house. Additionally, the New Orleans States newspaper ran a special edition in 1922 to benefit Kingsley House.

McMain had presence nationally and internationally. She was active in the National Federation of Settlement and Neighborhood Centers, serving on its board of directors for six years. McMain was a member of the executive committee of the National Institute of Social Science. Through these connections, she relocated to Paris, France, for a year to help establish the L'Accueil Franco-Americain, a Parisian settlement house, founded by J. Catlin-Tauffleib, the American wife of a French General. This Parisian settlement house was located on the rue du Pré-St. Gervais, 40 bis, 19 ième arrondissement (Belleville), where she replicated many of her efforts at the Kingsley House in New Orleans. After a year, she returned to New Orleans. However, in its first 10 years, the L'Accueil Franco-Americain served approximately 70,000 people, an indication of its success.

Soon after returning to the United States, her health declined, and she died on May 12, 1934, aged 66, at home at Kingsley House, from heart disease complicated by hypertension. There were funeral services at Kingsley House and in Baton Rouge followed by final interment at the cemetery in Baton Rouge. Her funeral services were conducted by both a minister and a rabbi.

== Awards and honors ==
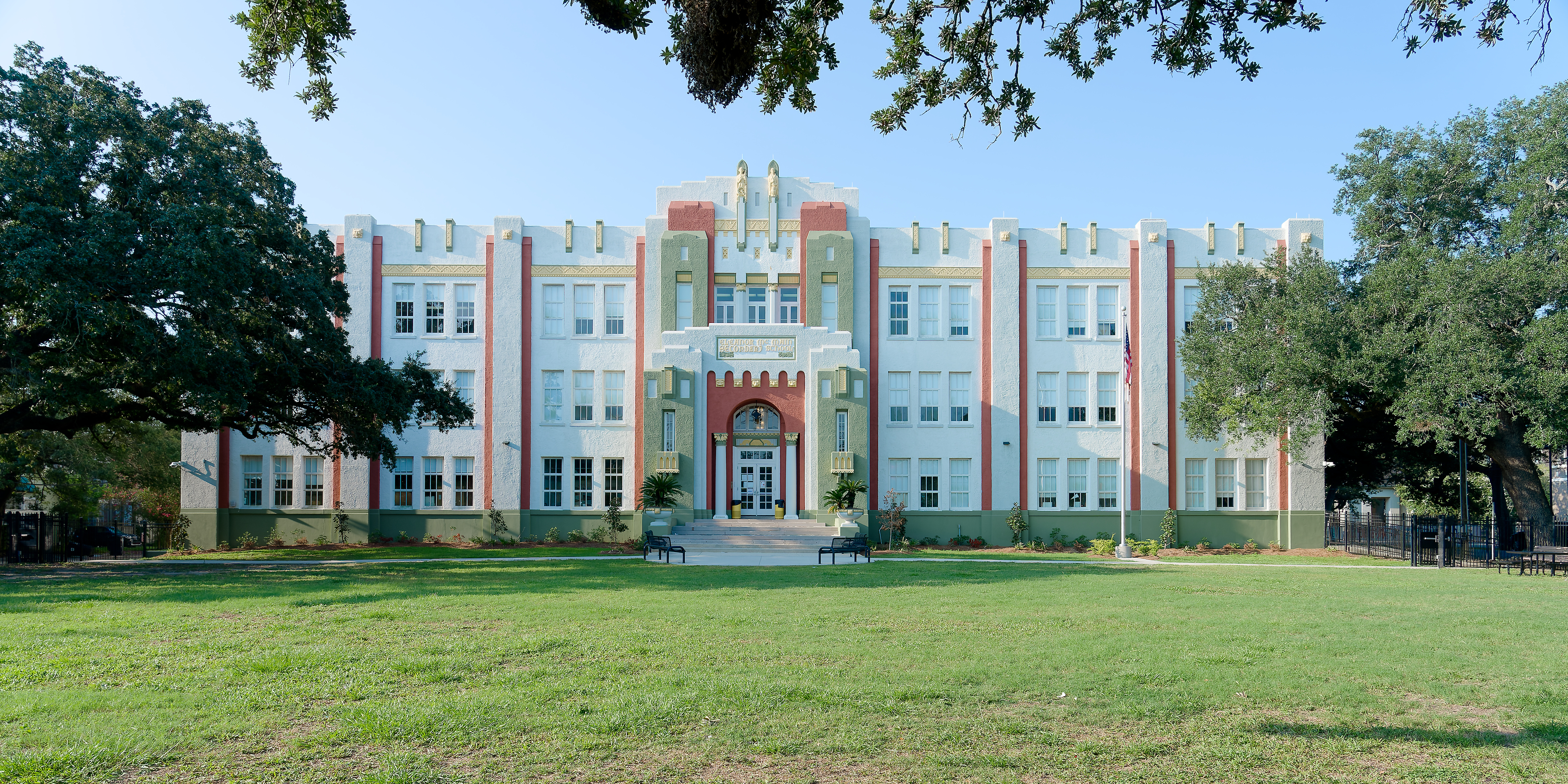
Eleanor McMain Secondary School, Uptown New Orleans, as seen in September 2023

Eleanor McMain was awarded the 1918 Times-Picayune Loving Cup for her community service. However, the actual presentation of the award took place two years later, at the opening of the 1920 meeting of the National Conference of Social Workers which was held in New Orleans that year. In accepting the award at the conference, with an audience of an estimated 4000 people, McMain stated, "I have done what I best love to do. I live and share my life with the dear people of the neighborhood."

McMain Secondary School in New Orleans is named in McMain's honor, the naming having occurred in 1930, while she was living. A biographical book about McMain was published in 1955. She was known colloquially as the "Jane Addams of New Orleans".
