= Cohen College Prep High School =

Walter L. Cohen High School
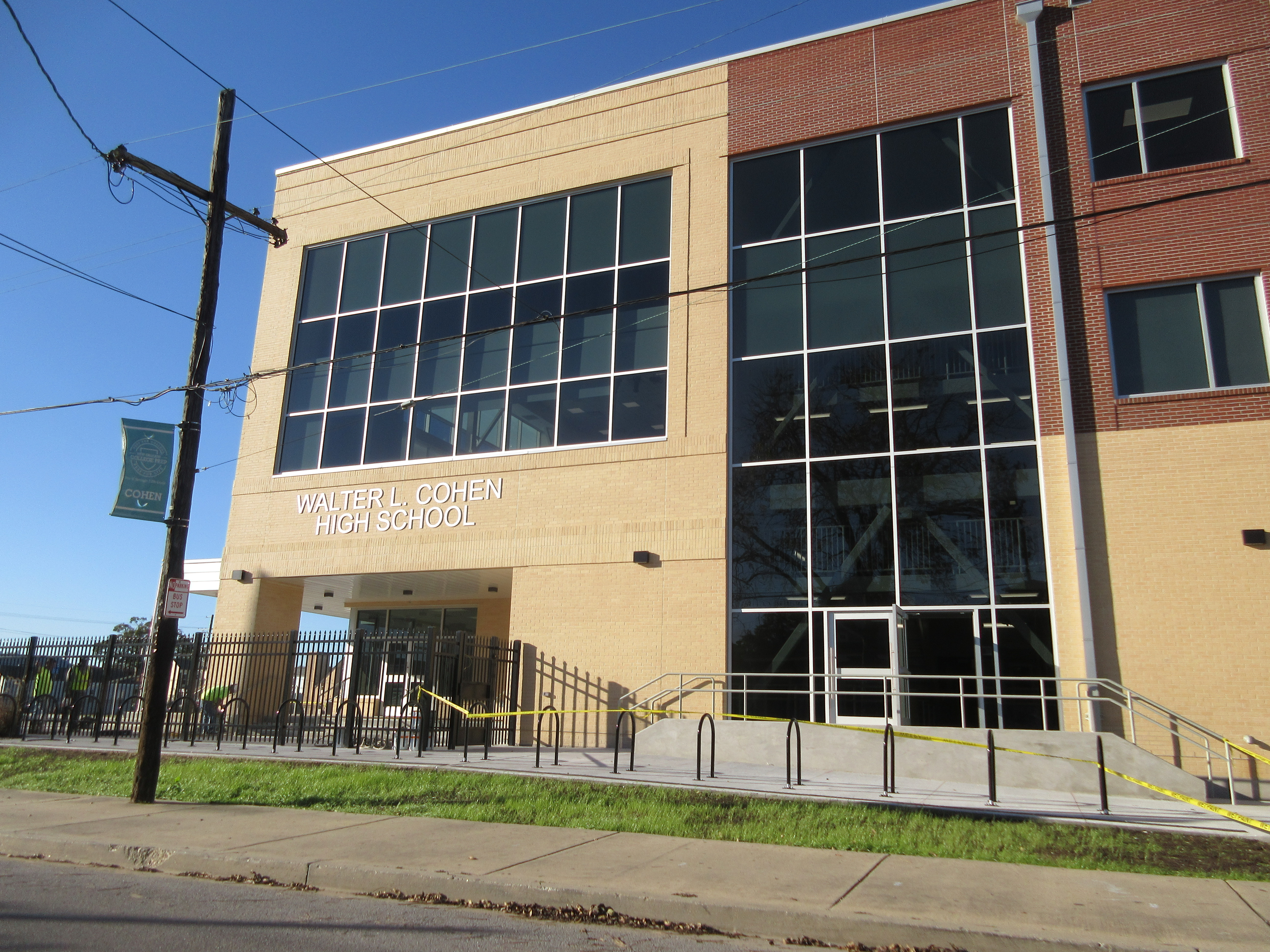
- School building in 2022

Location
- 3575 Baronne St. New Orleans, Louisiana 70115; United States; 29°55′50″N 90°05′39″W

Information
- Type: Public charter high school
- Opened: 1949, Reestablished 2011
- School district: Collegiate Academies
- Campus type: Inner-city
- Colors: Kelly green, white and gray
- Athletics: LHSAA
- Mascot: Hornet
- Team name: Green Hornets
- Website: https://wlc.collegiateacademies.org/

Walter L. Cohen High School is a New Orleans college prep charter high school serving 9th through 12th grade students in Uptown New Orleans, Louisiana, United States. It is named after Walter L. Cohen, a free man of color who became the Registrar of the U.S. Land Office.

== History ==
Walter L. Cohen High School opened in Fall 1949. Mr. Eli W. Sorrell was its first principal. The school was once under the authority of New Orleans Public Schools, but in 2009–2010 it fell under the authority of the Recovery School District. In 2011, Walter L. Cohen High School was still managed by the Recovery School District, but also became part of New Orleans College Prep, a charter school operator headquartered in New Orleans. The school was renamed Cohen College Prep High School.

=== Cohen College Prep High School ===
Cohen College Prep High School opened in the same building as the former Walter L. Cohen High School in 2011. The lower grades were managed by New Orleans College Prep while the Recovery School District had the Future is Now Schools managing Cohen's upper level grades before all grades were transferred to New Orleans College Prep. The school expanded one grade per year under an agreement with the alumni association of Cohen. In October 2012, when Cohen was still being managed by the Recovery School District, it had grades 11 and 12 with 110 students, and New Orleans College Prep had grades 9 and 10. In October 2012, Patrick Dobard, the superintendent of the RSD, fired the principal of Cohen.

For the 2019–20 school year, Cohen College Prep moved to the building that formerly housed the Edgar P. Harney School as its new building was being built on the current site of the school at 3520 Dryades St. The new school building is 110,000 square feet and cost $32 million to build.

== Athletics ==
Cohen College Prep athletics competes in the LHSAA.

== Notable alumni ==
=== Walter L. Cohen High School ===
- Tyler Perry - producer and actor
- Big Freedia - New Orleans musician known as the "queen of bounce music"
- Bruce Eugene - former college and professional football player
- Jaren Jackson - NBA Champion, Father of Jaren Jackson Jr.
- Aaron James - former NBA player for the New Orleans Jazz
- Mystikal - rapper, actor
- DJ Jubilee - DJ, rapper
- Soulja Slim - former rapper
- Jimmy Warren - former college and professional football player
- Duane Spencer - former college and professional basketball player
