= International High School of New Orleans =

Public charter high school in New Orleans, Louisiana

Location
- 2733 Esplanade Avenue. New Orleans, Louisiana 70119; United States
- 29.9471°N 90.0729°W

Information
- School type: Public Charter
- Established: 2009
- Grades: 9-12
- Gender: Co-ed
- Campus type: Inner-city
- Colors: Royal blue and green
- Athletics: LHSAA
- Team name: Panthers
- Website: https://www.ihsnola.org/

International High School of New Orleans was an American high school located in New Orleans, Louisiana, United States, at 727 Carondelet Street.

== School history ==
The school was a charter school, and opened in the fall of 2009. The first graduation of students occurred in 2013.

The school was permanently closed in 2025.

== School building history ==
The school's building was built in 1937 and was previously the L. E. Rabouin Memorial Trades School, later named the L. E. Rabouin Vocational High School and then L. E. Rabouin Career Magnet School. The Louisiana Recovery School District took over managing the building and former school after Hurricane Katrina in 2005. The building, however, has always been owned by the Orleans Parish School Board.

== Athletics ==
International High School athletics competes in the LHSAA.

== Notable Students ==
16-year-old student Dennis Maliq Barnes has a 4.98 GPA, has already earned 27 college credits and has scholarship offers from 130 colleges and universities. Barnes is considered a prodigy and is fluent in English and Spanish.
