= Sarah Reid =

Sarah Reid may refer to:

- Sarah Reid (curler) (born 1985), Scottish curler
- Sarah Reid (skeleton racer) (born 1987), Canadian skeleton racer

== See also ==
- Sarah Read (writer), 2019 winner of the Bram Stoker Award for Best First Novel
- Sarah Reed (disambiguation)
