= Sarah T. Reed High School =

High school in New Orleans, Louisiana

Sarah Towles Reed High School

Location
- 5316 Michoud Boulevard; New Orleans, (Orleans Parish), Louisiana 70129; United States; 30.0412°N 89.9313°W

Information
- Type: Public high school
- School district: OPSB Charter School
- Principal: D'Lacie Monk
- Staff: 23.75 (FTE)
- Enrollment: 377 (2022-23)
- Student to teacher ratio: 15.87
- Colors: Red, Black, and Gold
- Mascot: Olympians
- Website: str.collegiateacademies.org

Sarah Towles Reed High School is a high school in Eastern New Orleans in New Orleans, Louisiana.

== History ==
Reed opened in 1988 and was directly operated by the Orleans Parish School Board and then the Recovery School District. It was named after Sarah Towles Reed and the campus was built to house up to 1,170 students.

In 2005, as Hurricane Katrina was about to hit land, the New Orleans Regional Transit Authority (RTA) designated Reed High School as a place where people could receive transportation to the Louisiana Superdome, a shelter of last resort.

After Hurricane Katrina hit New Orleans, Reed was moved to an alternate location, where it stayed until October 2006. During that month it moved to its original building, which at that time housed middle and high school classes. Sarah T. Reed closed in spring 2014.

The Recovery School District stated that there were plans to reopen Reed in 2016; it was looking for organizations to act as charter school operators for Reed.

In 2018, Reed High School reopened under the management of Einstein Charter Schools.

== Athletics ==
Reed High athletics competes in the LHSAA.
