= New Orleans College Prep =

Charter school operator in New Orleans, Louisiana

New Orleans College Preparatory Academies or New Orleans College Prep (NOCP) is a charter school operator in New Orleans, Louisiana. It originally had its headquarters and its original campus in the former Sylvanie Williams Elementary School in Central City. The Cohen building is in Uptown.

NOCP currently holds charters for Sylvanie Williams College Prep, Crocker College Prep Elementary and Middle School, Cohen College Prep High School, and Hoffman College Prep. New Orleans College Prep was expanding one grade per year under an agreement with the alumni association of Cohen. As of October 2012 Cohen, under the Recovery School District, had grades 11 and 12 with 110 students, and New Orleans College Prep had grades 9 and 10. As of 2018, NOCP will not retain the Sylvanie Williams Charter, due to low test scores.

== History ==
The organization was established in 2006 by Ben Kleban. Ben Kleban operated as CEO of the Charter Network until the end of 2016, when we announced his resignation in order to run for and eventually win a seat on the Orleans Parish Schoolboard. The organization is currently run by interim CEO Natalie Kaharick. She initially operated with co-CEO Andy Parker, who stepped down in early 2017. When Kaharick was asked about Mr. Parker's reasons for stepping down, she did not elaborate but said "Sylvanie is a Stressor."

Initially, it was proposed that Cohen College Prep merge with Booker T. Washington High school. However, in 2015 after closed-door negotiations, Cohen High School was instead given its own renovation, whereas Booker T. Washington High School was assigned the KIPP network.
