= G. W. Carver High School (New Orleans) =

Location
- 3059 Higgins Blvd. New Orleans, Louisiana 70126; United States
- 29°59′40″N 90°02′20″W

Information
- Type: Public Charter
- Established: 2016
- Teaching staff: 44.40 (FTE)
- Grades: 9 to 12
- Enrollment: 778 (2023–2024)
- Student to teacher ratio: 17.52
- Campus type: Inner-city
- Colors: Kelly green and orange
- Athletics: LHSAA
- Team name: Rams
- Website: http://collegiateacademies.org/GWCarverHighSchool

G. W. Carver High School is a high school in the Desire Area, in the Ninth Ward of New Orleans. It is a public charter high school.

== History ==
=== George Washington Carver Senior High School ===
The school originally opened as George Washington Carver Senior High School in 1961. It was a public high school operated by New Orleans Public Schools, then Recovery School District starting in 2005. Prior to Hurricane Katrina the school had about 1,300 students. After Katrina, the original building was demolished. In August 2007, the Recovery School District (RSD) placed students from Carver and Marshall Middle School in twenty-four temporary trailers on the site of Holy Cross High School in the south end of the Lower Ninth Ward. In September 2007, the students were to move to another set of trailers on the original Carver Senior High campus.

=== Carver Collegiate Academy and Carver Preparatory Academy ===
In 2012, the Recovery School District opted to phase out Carver as a direct-run school and brought in charter school operator Collegiate Academies. Collegiate Academies then opened two charter high schools, George Washington Carver Collegiate Academy (CCA) and George Washington Carver Preparatory Academy (CPA). The schools also moved to Eastern New Orleans before moving back to the original Carver Senior High campus.

=== G. W. Carver High School ===
In 2014, ground was broken on a new building for G. W. Carver Collegiate Academy and G. W. Carver Preparatory Academy on the original Carver Senior High campus. In 2016, the new building was completed and for the opening of the new building, Collegiate Academies merged the two charter academies to become G. W. Carver High School still under the management of the charter school operator.

After hurricane Katrina, the legislature allocated $1.5 million to build a new athletic field for Carver. In 2019, although $1,000,000 had been spent the field had not been built.

== Athletics ==
G. W. Carver athletics competes in the LHSAA. The school offers basketball, football, track and field and volleyball.

Carver does not have an on-campus football stadium featuring bleachers and lighting.

== Notable alumni ==
=== George Washington Carver Senior High School ===
- Frank Cornish Jr., NFL defensive tackle
- Marshall Faulk, NFL running back
- Dee Martin, NFL defensive back
- Kerry Parker, NFL defensive back
- Ricky Woods, basketball player who played overseas
- Robert Woods, NFL wide receiver
