= Sarah Towles Reed =

American teacher and labor activist

- Born: March 8, 1882; St. Francisville
- Died: May 8, 1978 (aged 96); New Orleans
- Alma mater: H. Sophie Newcomb Memorial College; Tulane University; Loyola University New Orleans College of Law
- Occupation: Teacher, activist

Sarah Towles Reed (March 8, 1882 – May 8, 1978) was an American teacher and labor activist. Reed founded the first teachers union in New Orleans and organized her colleagues to fight for equitable pay for women teachers and for Black teachers. She taught in New Orleans public schools from 1910 to 1951 and lobbied the Louisiana State Legislature to advocate for the interests of the teachers' union for fifty-two years. In 2020 the USA Today "Women of the Century" project recognized Reed as one of the most significant women in Louisiana history.

== Early life and education ==
Sarah Butler Towles was born on March 8, 1882, on her family's estate, Ouida Plantation, near St. Francisville, Louisiana. Her parents were Sarah Butler Ker and Daniel Towles. The family included many educators; the grandfather of Sarah Butler Ker was David Ker, who had helped found the University of North Carolina at Chapel Hill. She was one of eleven children who helped farm on the plantation lands. As of 1895 the family could no longer afford to live on the property and moved to New Orleans, where Daniel Towles took a patronage job at the United States Custom House.

fair use image

Reed graduated from Sophie B. Wright Public School in New Orleans. In 1900 she enrolled at Newcomb College, where she had earned a scholarship to study, and received a bachelor's degree in 1904. She then earned a master's degree in Greek and Latin from Tulane University in 1906. In 1925, she would go on to earn a law degree from the Loyola Law School. She used her legal knowledge to advocate for her teaching colleagues.

== Early career ==
In 1906, Reed took a job at Belhaven College, a private university in Jackson, Mississippi. She suffered from homesickness as well as debilitating headaches and returned to Louisiana after two years.

In 1908 she returned to the New Orleans area where she would spend the rest of her life and career with the exception of the summer of 1918, when she worked for the Red Cross in Washington, D.C. to help with the war effort. Reed worked in multiple location in the New Orleans public school system, including Esplanade Girls High School, Warren Easton High School, and her own alma mater, Sophie B. Wright High School. From 1932 until her retirement in 1951, Reed worked at Alcée Fortier High School. Throughout her career, she practiced innovative methods of progressive teaching, including encouraging discussion and debate as well as leading field trips to attend court proceedings, to better prepare students to participate in a democratic society.

In 1917, Sarah married Elkerna Reed; they kept their marriage a secret, living in separate houses, because of a Louisiana law prohibiting married women from teaching. After Elkerna died in a traffic accident in 1921, Sarah decided to go public with the marriage, using his last name. The members of the Orleans Parish School Board fired her for violating the state law against married women teachers, but Reed argued that since she was a widow the law did not apply to her. The board granted her petition and she returned to teaching in September 1921. Reed's sister Roberta moved to New Orleans to take a teaching job and they lived together for the rest of their lives, advocating for teachers.

== Organizing efforts and later life ==
Male teachers in the Orleans Parish district were paid more than women, and in the early 1920s, Reed organized teachers to demand pay equity. When the school board could no longer ignore the demands for equal pay, the board president responded with a proposal to cut the salary of male teachers to meet that of female teachers. Reed recognized the move as an effort to divide the teachers and shifted her efforts to argue for salary stabilization for all teachers. In 1925 the New Orleans Public School Teacher's Association (NOPSTA) was organized to oppose salary reductions. Reed turned down the role of president to serve instead as the legislative chairman. She proposed a state constitutional amendment to guarantee stable teacher incomes, which passed and was signed into law in 1926. She also successfully fought for back pay for teacher's lost wages due to pay cuts in the mid 1920s.

After these victories, Reed turned her attention back to gender inequity in pay, drafting a bill to forbid gender-based discrimination in teachers' salaries. The Louisiana legislature passed the bill and Governor Huey Long signed it into law in 1928. The Orleans Parish parish school continued to find ways to work around the new law, providing higher salaries to schools with more male teachers. The financial situation for teachers worsened with the onset of the Great Depression, with some teachers spending their life savings to survive. In 1934, the American Federation of Teachers reached out to Reed, urging her to start a teachers union in the area, and the New Orleans Classroom Teachers Federation was formed in November 1935. The school board granted a salary increase in August 1937, but only to white teachers. Reed partnered with African-American teacher and civil rights activist Veronica Hill to petition the school board for equal pay for Black teachers. An elevator operator stopped them from entering a board meeting, but Reed and Hill climbed a fire escape and slid the petition under a locked door; the Black teachers received their raise the next day. African American teachers formed their own chapter of the American Federation of Teachers, the New Orleans League of Classroom Teachers (NOCTF). After efforts from the organized teachers and the NAACP, attorney A. P. Tureaud won a 1943 court case to force school administrators to equalize the salaries of white and Black educators. Reed also successfully lobbied against the prohibition of married women teachers, which was discontinued in 1936.

Because of Reed's advocacy of progressive change, she was targeted by conservative leaders. She faced multiple challenges to her patriotism, spurred by efforts by community members to enforce "Americanism" in public school teachers. In 1948, the school system's superintendent charged Reed with subversive teaching, saying "Mrs. Reed is antagonistic to all recognized authority. She exerts a damaging influence upon the patriotism of the student body and handicaps the school's Americanism program." Though Reed was a controversial public figure during this period, her union, former students, and teacher colleagues supported her during a public hearing and the school board dropped the charges against her. The conservative newspaper the New Orleans States wrote that "the school board has given academic freedom quite a victory."

Reed continued to promote cooperation between the two local chapters of the American Federation of Teachers, encouraging interracial efforts to advocate for teachers' rights. Reed retired from teaching in 1951 at age sixty-nine, but continued her position as executive secretary of the Teachers Federation until 1971, lobbying the legislature for teachers' retirement benefits and pay raises.

Illness forced her withdrawal from public life in 1972. She died in her home in New Orleans on May 8, 1978.

== Legacy ==
Upon her death, the Louisiana State Legislature passed a special resolution recognizing Reed's service as a "pioneer for improvement" in public education and her fifty-two years of regular attendance at the state legislature.

Sarah T. Reed High School was established in 1988 in New Orleans East and is still operating under the Einstein Charter Schools banner.

A biography of Reed, A Will of Her Own: Sarah Towles Reed and the Pursuit of Democracy in Southern Public Education by Leslie Gale Parr, was published in 2010.

In 2020, USA Today named Reed one of the ten most influential women in Louisiana history as part of its "Women of the Century" series.

== Bibliography ==
- Parr, Leslie Gale (2010). A Will of Her Own: Sarah Towles Reed and the Pursuit of Democracy in Southern Public Education. Athens, Georgia: University of Georgia Press. ISBN 9780820336312. OCLC 908260741.
