= Collegiate Academies =

Collegiate Academies operates six open-enrollment public charter high schools in Louisiana.

== Schools ==
- Abramson Sci Academy
- Collegiate Baton Rouge
- G. W. Carver High School
- Livingston Collegiate
- Opportunities Academy
- Rosenwald Collegiate

== History ==
Sci Academy opened in New Orleans East in August 2008.By April 2011 demand far outstripped seats. That fall the school launched Essential Skills, a special education program for students with cognitive disabilities. The program drew national attention, including a visit from Doug Lemov, author of ''Teach Like a Champion''.

In June 2012 Sci Academy graduated its first senior class. Ninety-seven percent of the graduates gained acceptance to four-year colleges, including Amherst College, Colorado College, Louisiana State University, and Wesleyan University.

The network expanded in August 2012 with the opening of George Washington Carver Collegiate Academy and George Washington Carver Preparatory Academy.

In January 2014 Troy Simon, a member of Sci Academy’s inaugural graduating class, introduced First Lady Michelle Obama at the White House College Opportunity Summit.

Three months later, in April 2014, U.S. News & World Report ranked Sci Academy the number-two high school in Louisiana.

== Controversy ==
In 2013, Sci Academy, George Washington Carver Collegiate, and George Washington Carver Preparatory posted the highest suspension rates among New Orleans high schools. Carver Collegiate suspended 69 percent of its students during the 2012–13 school year, while Carver Prep reached 61 percent and Sci Academy 58 percent. Students faced suspension for laughing too much, hugging friends, or showing disrespect. Reports highlighted repeated violations of federal rules requiring review after ten suspensions for special-education students.

The Southern Poverty Law Center sent Collegiate Academies an open letter over these practices. In 2014, a coalition of more than thirty students and families filed a federal civil-rights complaint alleging that the discipline policies amounted to child abuse. The complaint asked the U.S. Departments of Justice and Education to investigate.

Protests followed. Three students withdrew from the schools. Students published a list of grievances that read in part:

We get disciplined for anything and everything. We get detentions or suspensions for not walking on the taped lines in the hallway, slouching, for not raising our hands in a straight line. [sic] The teachers and administrators tell us this is because they are preparing us for college. It trains us for the military, orworse [sic], for jail.

Students also reported missing textbooks, no library, and instruction below grade level.

In 2015, a federal judge approved a landmark special-education settlement that increased state oversight of New Orleans charter schools, including Collegiate Academies, and required third-party monitoring.

On January 6, 2016, the Louisiana Department of Education found that George Washington Carver Collegiate had violated a special-education student’s rights by suspending him for a full month.
