= Sarah A. Reed =

Writer and philanthropist

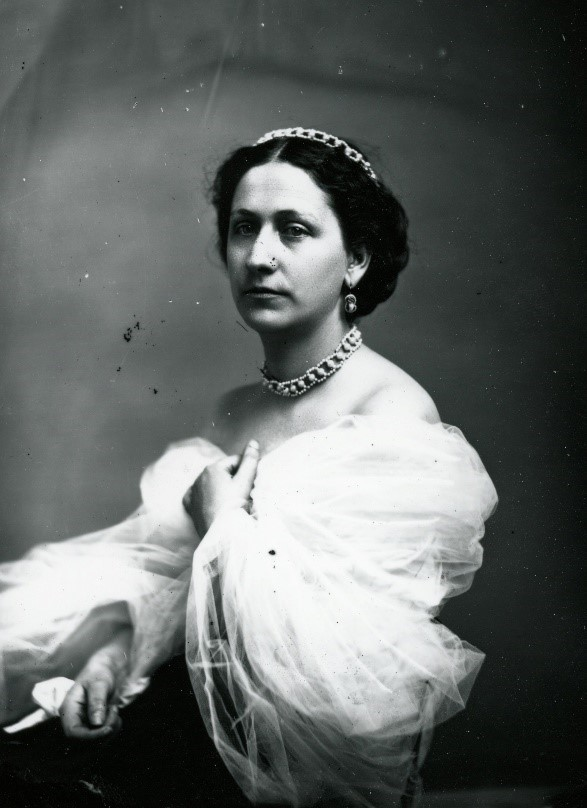
- Born: March 16, 1838; Ashtabula
- Died: January 27, 1934 (aged 95)

Sarah A. Reed (March 16, 1838 – January 27, 1934) was a philanthropist and novelist from Erie, Pennsylvania.

== Early life ==
Sarah Ann Reed was born on March 16, 1838 in Ashtabula, Ohio, the eighth child of William Wyndham Reed, Secretary-Treasurer of the Erie Canal, and Elizabeth H. (Smith) Reed. Her family relocated to Erie when she was seven years old.

== Philanthropy and writing ==
Reed's most prominent philanthropic effort was the Erie Home for the Friendless social service agency, founded in 1871 by Reed and 29 other women. Reed served as president of the Home for the Friendless for over forty years. She also held a well-attended class in her house that covered a wide range of topics, with more than 1000 people attending classes over the years.

Reed wrote a number of novels. One was a work of historical fiction, A Romance of Arlington House (1908), which was printed in multiple editions. It is an epistolary novel told from the point of view of Virginia Colton, a visitor to Arlington House in 1824, and includes appearances by Gilbert du Motier, Marquis de Lafayette and Robert E. Lee.

Sarah A. Reed died on 27 January 1934. After her death the Home for the Friendless was renamed the Sarah A. Reed Home, a name she would not allow while she was alive.

== Selected publications ==
- Reed, Sarah A. (1890). "The belated passenger | WorldCat.org".
- Reed, Sarah A. (1900). After fifty years, or, The story of two love letters | WorldCat.org.
- Reed, Sarah A. (1908). A romance of Arlington house.
- Reed, Sarah A. (1931). My grandmother's story and other stories | WorldCat.org.
