= The Willow School (Louisiana) =

Coordinates: 29°56′08″N 90°06′50″W

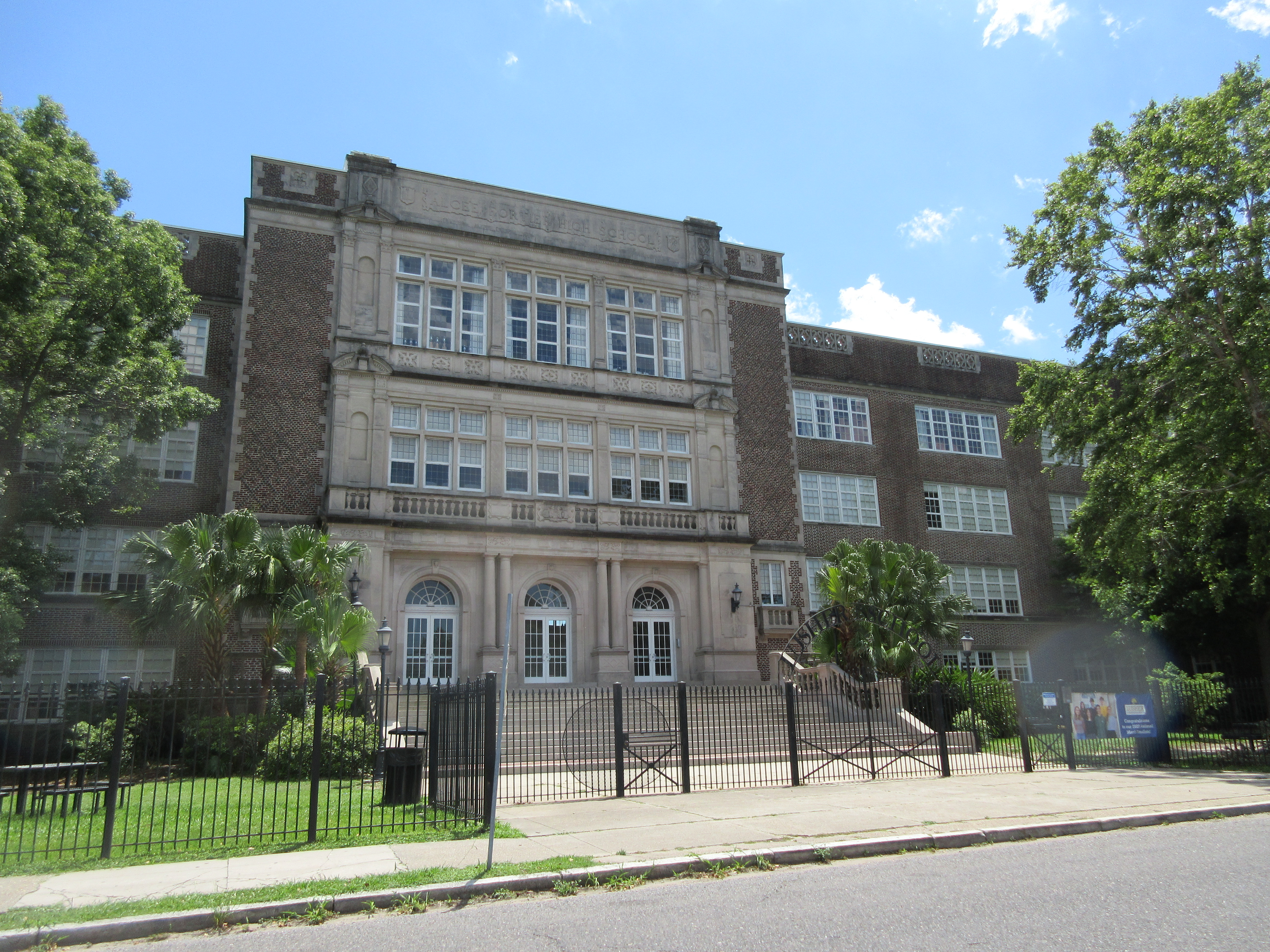
- The administration and the high school of The Willow School are located in the former Alcee Fortier High School building.

Location
- Lower school: 7315 Willow St., New Orleans, LA 70118, United States; Middle school: 5625 Loyola Avenue, New Orleans, LA 70115; High school: 5624 Freret St., New Orleans, LA 70115 United States

Information
- Type: Public Charter School
- Motto: Celebrating cultural diversity through high academics and the arts.
- Established: Elementary: 1917, High school: 2006
- School district: New Orleans Public Schools
- Grades: K–12
- Campus type: Urban
- Colors: Navy blue and vegas gold
- Athletics: LHSAA
- Team name: Lions
- Website: https://www.willowschoolnola.org/

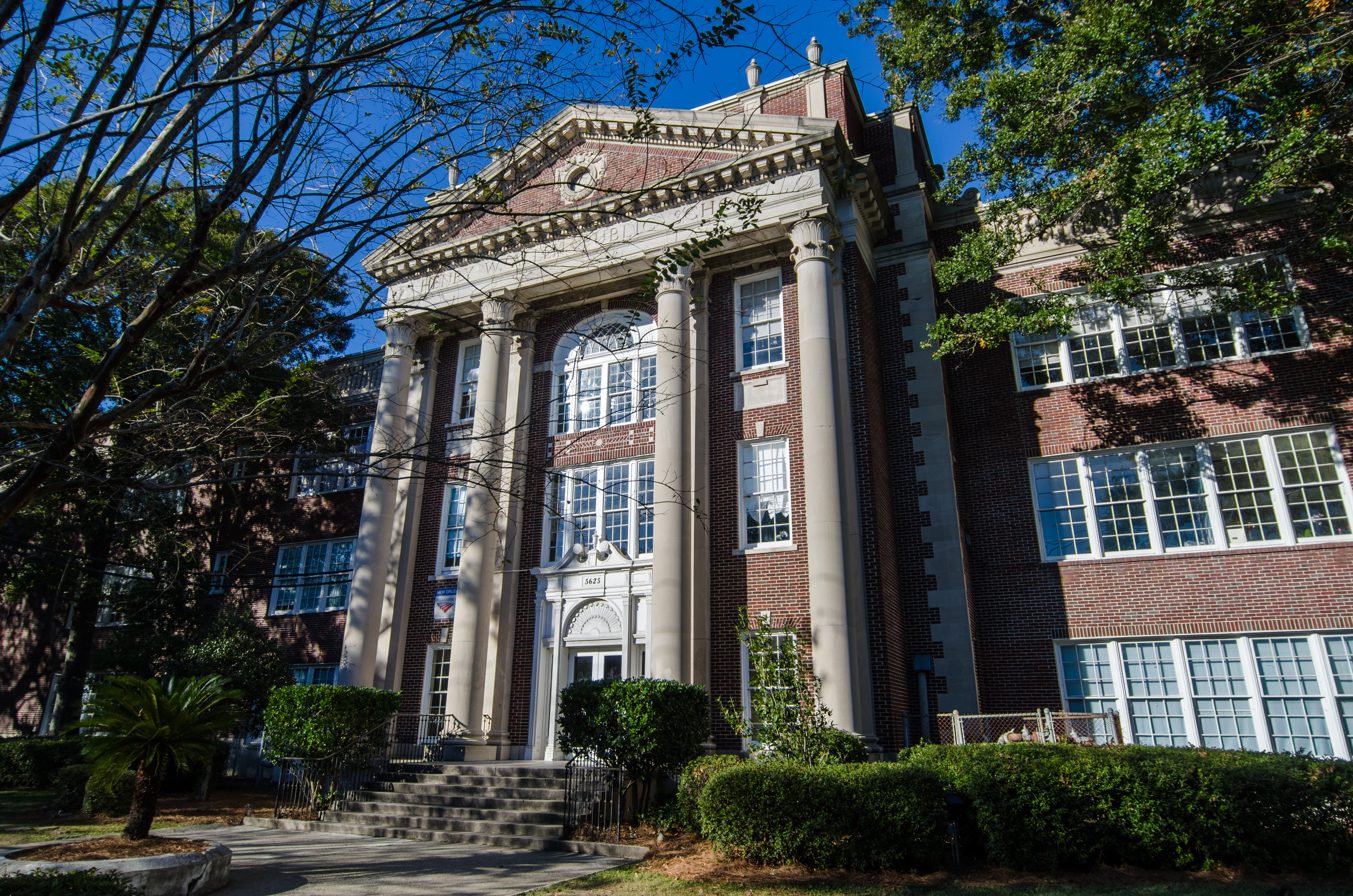
Middle school campus

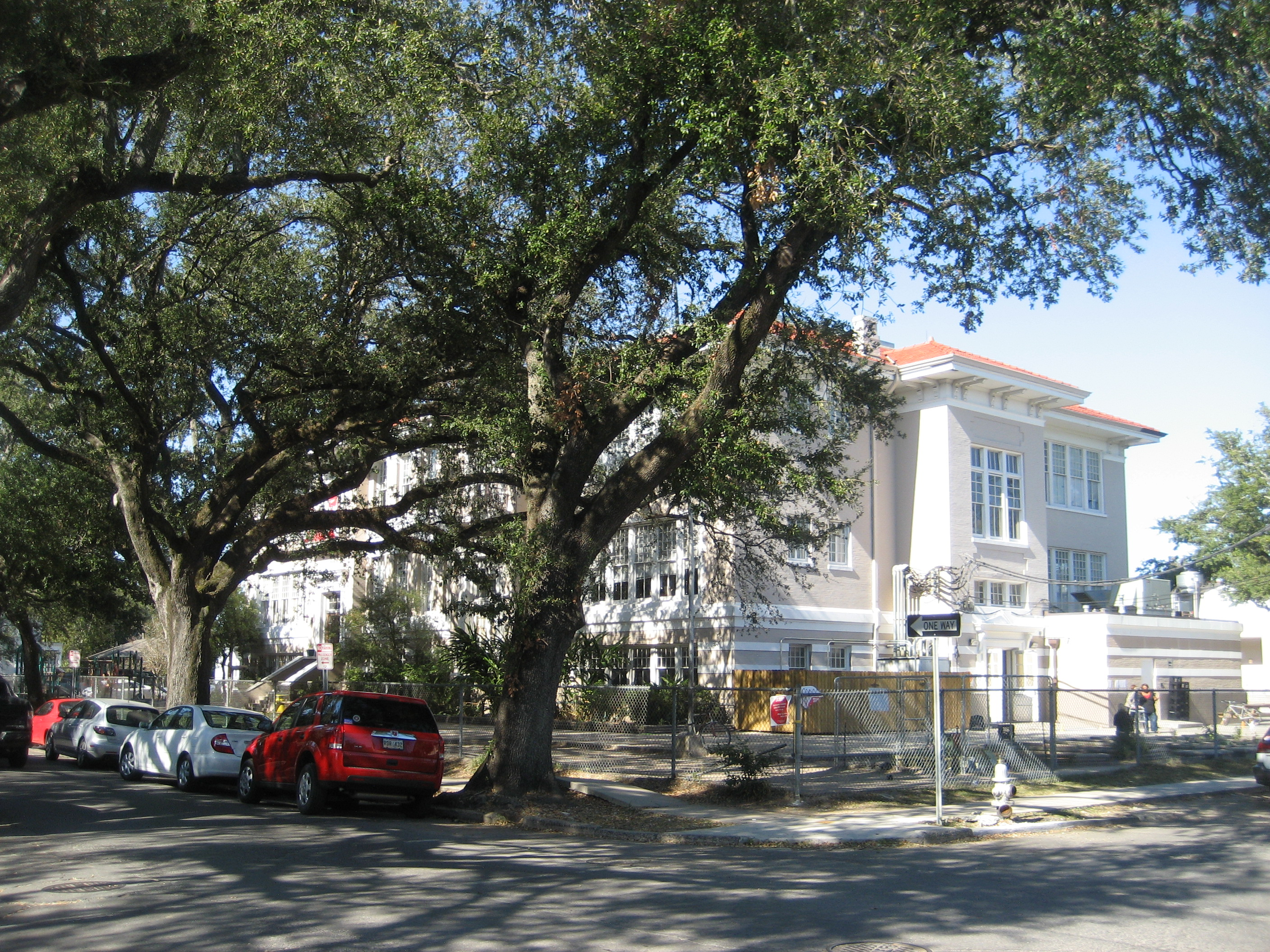
The Willow School lower school campus

Willow School, formerly Lusher Charter School, is a K-12 charter school in uptown New Orleans, Louisiana. Willow is chartered by Advocates for Arts Based Education (AABE), which acts as the board for the entire school. The Willow School has three uptown campuses; the lower school program is housed at the Dr. Everett J. Williams, Jr. Campus (formerly Willow Campus), the middle school is at the Ellis L. Marsalis, Jr. Campus (the former Henry W. Allen School), and the high school is at the Elijah Brimmer, Jr. Campus (the former Alcée Fortier High School) on Freret Street. A temporary campus was housed at the Jewish Community Center on St. Charles Avenue.

In 2016, Danielle Dreilinger of The Times-Picayune described the school as "exceptionally popular" and "one of the best public elementary schools in Louisiana". Andrew Vanacore, of the same publication, wrote in 2013 that Lusher was "top-notch".

== History ==
Lusher was founded in 1913 and for its first few decades only taught grades K-6 at its Willow Street campus. The school was named for Robert Mills Lusher, the Louisiana State Superintendent of Education (1865-1868 and 1876-1879) who was dedicated to the Confederacy, segregation of public schools, and white supremacy.

In 1982, Kathy Riedlinger, who served as the charter school's CEO through January 2022, was named principal. In 1990, Lusher moved its sixth grade class into the unused Carrollton Courthouse building at 719 South Carrollton Avenue; the school then expanded to include seventh and eighth grades while keeping the Willow Street campus for its K-5 program. The middle school was referred to as "Lusher Extension".

In 2003 however, the school community began discussing the possibility of opening a high school and later began discussing applying to become a charter school. In early August 2005, the school applied to the Orleans Parish School Board to become a charter school. In the aftermath of Hurricane Katrina, the school’s charter application was granted and the school added grades 9 through 12. Lusher Charter High School opened its doors for the first time on January 17, 2006, with 48 students and only 9th and 10th grades and six high school only teachers (one for each subject: math, science, social studies, English, French, and Spanish). The high school was housed at the Carrollton Courthouse with the middle school for its first semester. Due to space limitations at the Carrollton campus, both the middle school and high school had to find a new home. In August 2006, both schools moved to their new campus, the defunct Alcee Fortier High School, on Freret Street.

Filming for Cirque du Freak: The Vampire's Assistant took place at Willows' high school Brimmer (then Fortier) campus during spring 2008.

In the summer of 2009, the Brees Family Field, a football field on the Alcee Fortier campus, was completed with the assistance of Drew and Brittany Brees and the Brees Dream Foundation.

As of December 2015, the school did not disclose the name of its admissions test. That month the Louisiana Attorney General ruled that the school must disclose the test's name. In Louisiana, schools are not permitted to use IQ tests for admissions purposes.

In 2021 the Lusher middle school moved from the Fortier building to the former Henry Watkins Allen School; until that year, the Allen building housed New Orleans Charter Science and Mathematics High School (Sci High).

Lusher's full name was, until 2022, etched into the brick facade of the main building at the Willow Street campus. However, in 2022, a motion was passed to change the name of the school, and it was renamed to the Willow School, after the street on which its elementary school is located. The individual campuses were also renamed. The former Lusher elementary building was renamed after Orleans Parish school superintendent Everett J. Williams. The Allen building was renamed after Ellis Marsalis Jr., and the high school, formerly named after Alcée Fortier, was renamed after Fortier High teacher Elijah J. Brimmer Jr. The names of Lusher, Allen, and Fortier were removed as those individuals supported segregation of races and/or the Confederacy.

== General information ==
=== Administration ===
- CEO - Nicolette London (Interim)
- Executive Director of Planning and Administration - Sheila Nelson
- Elementary School Principal - Linda Clogher
- Middle School Principal - Elizabeth Sepanik
- High School Principal - Robert Hill

The school administration is in the high school building.

== Admissions ==
As of 2014 Kindergarten admissions is based on three levels: the first priority goes to siblings of students already admitted, the second priority goes to residents of the Willow attendance zone, and the third goes equally to students testing into the school and to children of staff of Tulane University.

In 2013 there were 152 spaces for admission and 1,336 applicants for these spaces. In 2015 the kindergarten had 104 spaces, and it had 300 to 350 applicants. When the following were subtracted from the 104 spaces: the 25-35 zoned students, siblings of already admitted students, the 15 students with parents/guardians working for Tulane, and those who scored well on a kindergarten scorecard; only 15 spaces remained for "ordinary" applicants. In 2016 Dreilinger stated that due to the admissions requirements, "the average child, with no special status, has had very little chance of getting in."

As of 2016 Lusher was one of several New Orleans public schools that did not participate in OneApp, the common application system for New Orleans public schools. Dreilinger stated that Lusher's application procedure was "so complicated that parents have made spreadsheets to keep track of the steps". In 2015 the OPSB voted to require all charter schools to participate in OneApp.

=== Attendance boundary ===
In the post-Hurricane Katrina period, Lusher Charter retained its pre-Katrina attendance boundaries for elementary school students; no such boundary existed for its secondary school. This boundary included parts of Uptown New Orleans, including sections of East Carrollton, and all on-campus residences of Tulane University and Loyola University. In 2016 the kindergarten, which had 104 places, had 25 to 35 students who were zoned to Lusher.

The Greater New Orleans Collaborative of Charter Schools director, Ken Ducote, stated that this boundary may have been established after public schools in New Orleans were desegregated. The attendance boundary was preserved because parents and employees voted to make Lusher a charter school just before the hurricane's arrival. All of the other New Orleans schools lost their attendance boundaries after Katrina hit New Orleans. In the post-Katrina period the attendance area, previously economically mixed, became wealthier. In 2010, the board of Lusher Charter voted to extend the attendance boundary so that only Kindergarteners received automatic admissions based on their residences. In 2011, the CEO of Lusher, Kathy Riedlinger, criticized families who moved into Lusher's attendance zone specifically to gain admission for their children, arguing that the attendance zone was only meant to be used by longtime families already living in the area. At that time OPSB officials had discussed the possibility that the attendance zone could be discontinued.

In 2014 members of the Advancement Project filed a federal civil rights complaint that criticized several aspects of New Orleans school admissions, including Lusher Charter's attendance boundary; the group argued that the boundary was intended to inhibit the enrollment of African-Americans. The head of the Louisiana Department of Education, John White, criticized the complaint, referring to it as a "joke". That year Lusher officials stated that the attendance boundary would remain.

On September 10, 2015, the Orleans Parish School Board voted to end Lusher's attendance boundary effective fall 2017.

== Athletics ==
The Willow School athletics competes in the LHSAA.
