= Algiers Charter Schools Association =

Charter management organization in New Orleans, Louisiana

- Headquarters: Algiers, New Orleans
- Coordinates: 29°55′42″N 90°01′48″W
- Website: https://www.algierscharterschools.org/

Algiers Charter Schools Association (ACSA) is a charter management organization in New Orleans, Louisiana, United States. It operates eight charter schools.

After Hurricane Katrina hit New Orleans, several schools in the Algiers area were transferred from the New Orleans Public Schools to the ACSA.

The Association partners with the COOL Cooperative, a 501(c)(3) nonprofit, to provide after school, weekend, and summer programs. The programs provide academic support, community service opportunities, professional mentorship, and film-industry standard training and workforce development.

== Schools ==
The schools operated by the Algiers Charter Schools Association are:

- Martin Behrman Charter Academy of Creative Arts (PK-8)
- William J. Fischer Accelerated Academy (PK-8)
- Harriet R. Tubman Charter School of Science, Technology, Engineering, and Mathematics (PK-8)
- Algiers Technology Academy (9-12)
- Landry-Walker High School (9-12)
