= Oprah's Angel Network =

Charitable organization

Oprah's Angel Network was a charity organized in 1998, and involved in various projects such as education supplies, school construction, disaster relief, and other areas.

In May 2010, with Oprah's show ending, the charity stopped accepting donations and was shut down.

== Hurricane Katrina ==
In the wake of Hurricane Katrina, Oprah created the Oprah Angel Network Katrina registry which raised more than $11 million for relief efforts. Winfrey personally gave $10 million to the cause. Homes were built in Texas, Mississippi, Louisiana, and Alabama before the one-year anniversary of Hurricanes Katrina and Rita.
