= New Orleans Charter Science and Mathematics High School =

New Orleans Charter Science & Math High School
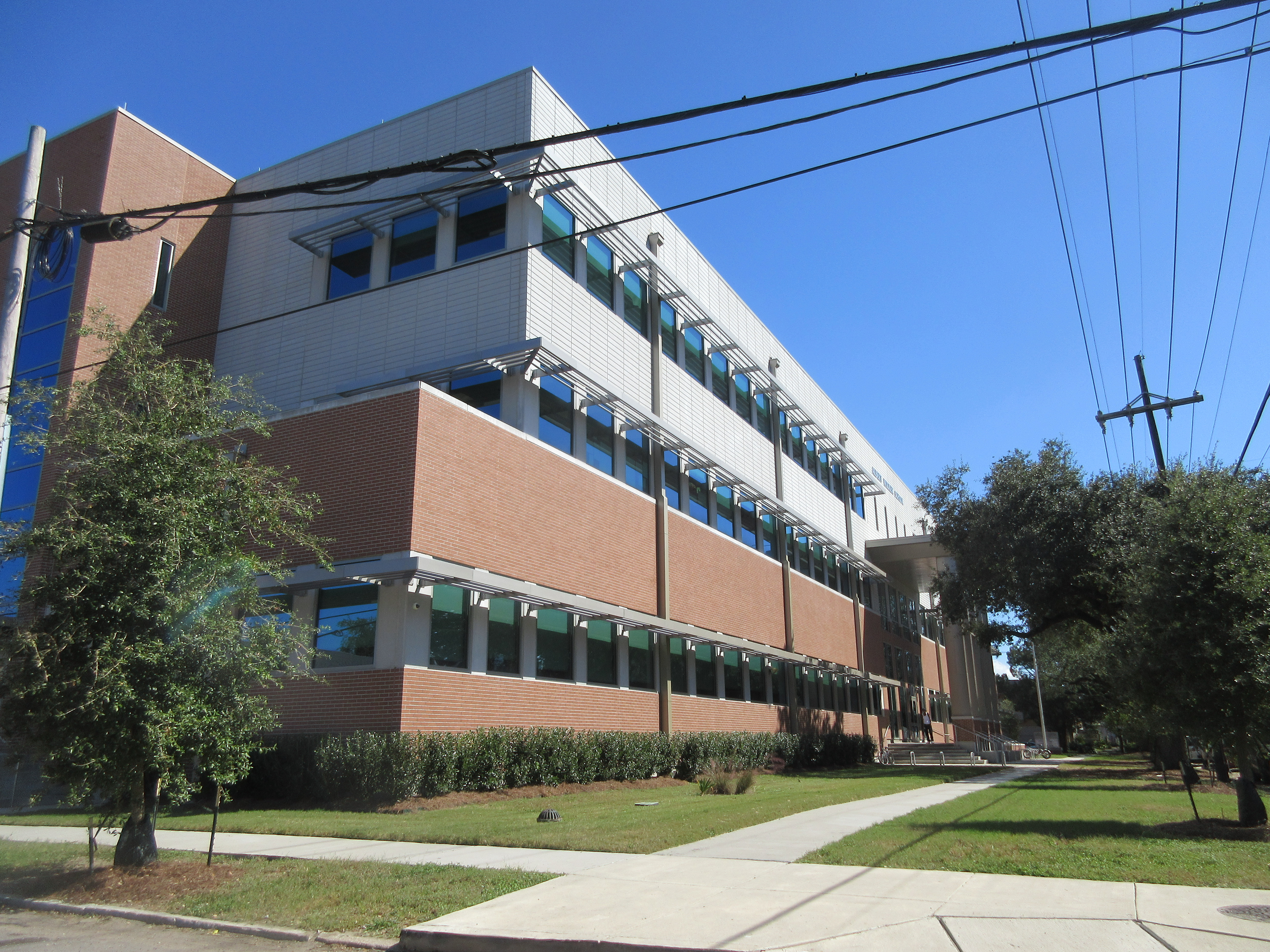

Location
- 2011 Bienville Street; New Orleans, Louisiana 70112; United States; 29.9633°N 90.0791°W

Information
- School type: Open enrollment public charter
- Motto: Catalyst to Your Future
- Founded: 1993
- School board: Orleans Parish School District (charter school).
- Principal: Monique Cola
- Teaching staff: 39.94 (FTE)
- Grades: 9-12
- Enrollment: 579 (2022–2023)
- Student to teacher ratio: 14.50
- Colors: Royal blue and white
- Team name: Nautilus
- Website: www.noscihigh.org

New Orleans Charter Science & Math High School is an open enrollment charter school in New Orleans, Louisiana, USA. Students commonly refer to the school as "SciHigh", "Science & Math", or vice versa, "Math and Science".

The organization, Advocates for Science and Mathematics Education, governs the school, which is located in Uptown, in the former Allen Elementary School campus. The school is supported in part by the Foundation for Science and Mathematics Education, a 501(c)(3) nonprofit organization that advocates for "an open-admissions, rigorous, hands-on educational model paired with the belief that any student can succeed when provided with a safe and supportive environment."

== History ==
The school was founded in 1993 by Barbara MacPhee as a half day school focused on the rigorous instruction of mathematics and science. Students from any New Orleans Public School were able to enroll part-time at NOCSMHS and part-time at their "home" school. From its inception until Hurricane Katrina, the school was housed on the campus of Delgado Community College.

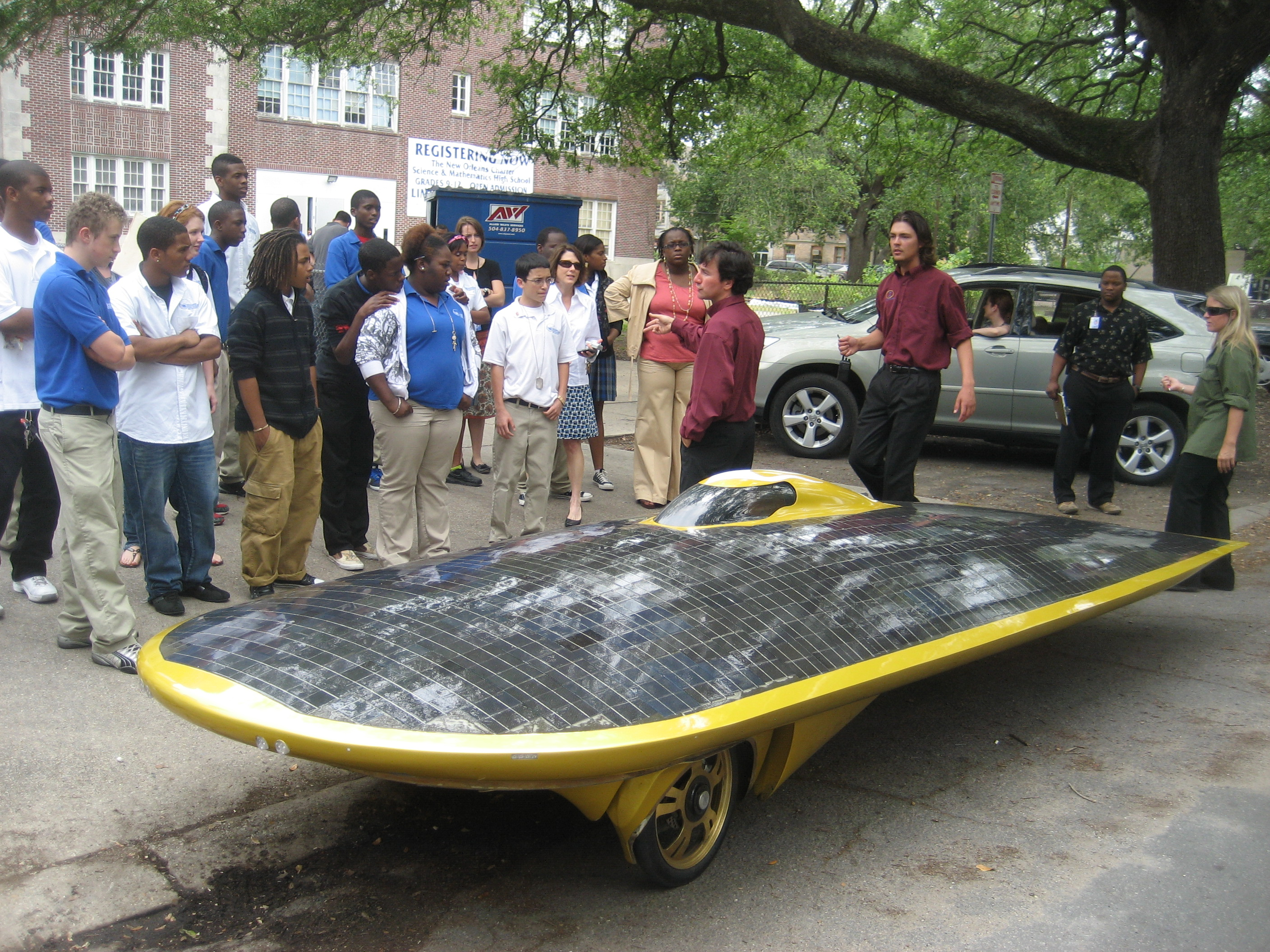
Students view solar powered car at the high school campus at the time on Nashville Avenue, Uptown New Orleans, in 2009

After Katrina, the school was chartered under the auspices of the Orleans Parish School Board as a full-day, grades 9-12 high school, offering instruction in all subjects, including English, social studies, and foreign language. Due to the damage Delgado received from Katrina, NOCSMHS moved to the building which housed the former Henry W. Allen Elementary School in the uptown New Orleans neighborhood.

In October 2010, the school met its performance growth goal by attaining a School Performance Score over 80.0, giving it a two-star rating.

The following year, in October 2011, the school far surpassed its growth goal and earned a "B+" grade—the highest grade given to any open-enrollment school in the New Orleans area.

In April 2018 the board for Sci High selected former Delgado Community College employee Monique Cola as the school's headmaster; she has a PhD from Tulane University.

The groundbreaking for the Mid-City campus was scheduled for fall 2018. The school relocated there in 2020. It has a 400-seat gymnasium on the second floor. Katherine Hart of the Mid-City Messenger described it as "the only New Orleans public school built specifically for STEM education."

== Faculty ==
In 2018 the school retained 68% of its faculty members, with 13 members starting work and 28 continuing to work from the previous year.

== School building format ==
- The first floor is primarily science classes. It also holds the cafeteria, Phys. Ed. room, Art class, and counselors office
- The second floor is primarily language arts and social studies classes. It also holds the Computer Lab, Auditorium, and Main Office
- The third floor is primarily the math and English classes. It also holds the Library and Special Education classes

== Athletics ==
New Orleans Charter Science and Mathematics High athletics competes in the LHSAA.
