= Orleans Parish School Board =

Public school system in New Orleans, Louisiana, U.S.

Location
- 2401 Westbend Parkway; New Orleans, LA 70114 United States
- Coordinates: 29.928789°N 90.020757°W

District information
- Type: Public
- Motto: Every Child. Every School. Every Day.
- Grades: PK - 12
- Established: 1841
- President: Katherine Baudouin
- Vice-president: Leila Jacobs Eames
- Superintendent: Fateama Fulmore
- Schools: 20
- NCES District ID: 2201170

Students and staff
- Students: approximately 15,500 (excludes RSD- & BESE-chartered public schools)

Other information
- Website: nolapublicschools.com

The Orleans Parish School Board (OPSB), branded as NOLA Public Schools, governs the public school system that serves New Orleans, Louisiana. It includes the entirety of Orleans Parish, coterminous with the city of New Orleans.

In the 2024-25 school year, OPSB currently governs 67 of the 74 public schools located in Orleans Parish including 1 direct-run school (The Leah Chase School) and 65 Charter Schools operated by 31 non-profit Charter Management Organizations. Though the Orleans Parish School Board has retained ownership of all the assets of the New Orleans Public Schools system, including all school buildings, over 90% of students attending publicly-funded schools post-Katrina in Orleans Parish attended charter schools.

Public charter schools in New Orleans previously operating under the state-run Recovery School District were returned to OPSB in 2018.

The headquarters of the OPSB is in the West Bank neighborhood of Algiers.

== History ==
=== Jim Crow Era ===
Like virtually all areas in the South, New Orleans had a segregated public school system for most of its early history, as government officials (who were all White, due to Black disfranchisement) did not want their children in the same schools as Black children.

In 1960, the schools were integrated, which caused a national scandal and crisis. Katy Reckdahl of The Times Picayune wrote that at the time, "outside observers expressed shock that desegregation provoked such strife in heterogeneous, easy-going New Orleans."

=== Reorganization of school system following Hurricane Katrina ===
NOPS was wholly controlled by the OPSB before Hurricane Katrina and was the New Orleans area's largest school district before Katrina devastated the city on August 29, 2005, damaging or destroying more than 100 of the district's 128 school buildings. NOPS served approximately 65,000 students pre-Katrina. For decades prior to Hurricane Katrina's landfall, the OPSB-administered system was widely recognized as the lowest performing school district in Louisiana. According to researchers Carl L. Bankston and Stephen J. Caldas, only 12 of the 103 public schools then in operation within the city limits of New Orleans showed reasonably good performance at the beginning of the 21st century.

In Katrina's immediate aftermath, an overwhelmed Orleans Parish School Board asserted that the school system would remain closed indefinitely. The Louisiana Legislature took advantage of this abdication of local leadership and acted swiftly. As a result of legislation passed by the state in November 2005, 102 of the city's worst-performing public schools were transferred to the Recovery School District (RSD), which is operated by the Louisiana Department of Education and was headed for a key period (2008-2011) by education leader Paul Vallas. The Recovery School District had been created in 2003 to allow the state to take over failing schools, those that fell into a certain "worst-performing" metric. Five public schools in New Orleans had been transferred to RSD control prior to Katrina.

The NOPS system was trying to decentralize power away from the pre-Katrina school board central bureaucracy to individual school principals and charter school boards, and allow for school choice, allowing them to enroll their children in almost any school in the district. Charter school accountability is realized by the granting of renewable operating contracts of varying lengths permitting the closure of those not succeeding. In October 2009, the release of annual school performance scores demonstrated continued growth in the academic performance of New Orleans' public schools. By aggregating the scores of all public schools in New Orleans (OPSB-chartered, RSD-chartered, RSD-administered, etc.) to permit a comparison with pre-Katrina outcomes, a district performance score of 70.6 was derived. This score represented a 6% increase over the equivalent 2008 metric, and a 24% improvement when measured against the equivalent pre-Katrina (2004) metric, when a district score of 56.9 was posted. Notably, the score of 70.6 approached the score (78.4) posted in 2009 by the adjacent, suburban Jefferson Parish public school system, though that system's performance score was itself below the state average of 91.

The current RSD superintendent is Patrick Dobard, while the diminished, OPSB portion of NOPS has been led since 2015 by Henderson Lewis.

The conversion of the majority of New Orleans' public schools to charter schools following Hurricane Katrina has been cited by author Naomi Klein in her book The Shock Doctrine as an application of economics shock therapy, and of the tactic of taking advantage of public disorientation following a disaster to effect radical change in public policy.

=== Reunification ===
According to Senate Bill 432, passed by the Louisiana State Legislature on May 10, 2016 and signed into law by Governor of Louisiana John Bel Edwards on May 12, 2016, all public schools in New Orleans were returned to governance by OPSB by July 1, 2018.

== Surveys of public opinion ==
A 2009 survey conducted by Tulane University's Cowen Institute for Public Education Initiatives, which is listed as a "Key Partner" of New Schools for New Orleans, a charter school advocacy group, indicated that the state's takeover of the majority of NOPS and the subsequent spread of charters was viewed with strong approval, by both parents of students and by citizens in general. Specifically, a poll of 347 randomly selected Orleans Parish voters and 300 randomly selected parents of children in the NOPS system indicated that 85% of parents surveyed reported they were able to enroll their children at the school they preferred, and 84% said the enrollment process was easy - findings that surprised the researchers. Furthermore, 82% of parents with children enrolled at charter schools gave their children's schools an "A" or "B", though only 48% of parents of children enrolled in non-chartered public schools assigned A's or B's to the schools their children attended. According to the survey, clear majorities of parents and of voters overall did not want the Orleans Parish School Board to regain full administrative control of the NOPS system.

== Curriculum ==
Because the great majority of public schools in New Orleans operate as independent charter schools under contract with the Orleans Parish School Board, individual schools and the charter management organizations that run them generally select their own curriculum and instructional materials rather than following a single district-wide curriculum. Charter autonomy over curriculum, hiring and scheduling has been described as one of the defining features of the New Orleans system since the post-Katrina reorganization.

All public schools in the city, including charter schools, are required to use the Louisiana state academic content standards and to participate in the state's annual assessment program, the Louisiana Educational Assessment Program (LEAP), which tests students in grades 3 through 8 in English, mathematics, science and social studies, with end-of-course examinations at the high school level. School Performance Scores derived from LEAP and related measures are issued each year by the Louisiana Department of Education and are used in charter renewal decisions. The Louisiana standards were last comprehensively revised in 2016; in early 2025, the state Department of Education convened a review committee to update the English and mathematics standards, with state superintendent Cade Brumley citing an emphasis on phonics and foundational mathematics.

Specialty programs at individual schools include French immersion at Audubon Charter School, Lycée Français de la Nouvelle-Orléans and the International School of Louisiana; Montessori instruction at Audubon Charter School; and foreign language and international baccalaureate–style coursework at several of the BESE-chartered schools. On the 2024–25 LEAP assessments, 37% of NOLA Public Schools students in grades 3 through 8 scored at "mastery" or above in English, 24% in mathematics and 23% in science, each one percentage point higher than the prior year.

In the mid-1800s the German American community of New Orleans attempted to have the German language supplant French as a subject in school. The German Society made efforts to have German introduced into the school system. In 1910 the German language was added to the NOPS curriculum, making it a regular subject in high schools and, at the elementary school, an afternoon elective. At the time, 10% of high school students selected German. In 1918, because of World War I propaganda, German was discontinued. German was re-introduced in 1931. The Deutsches Haus, the successor to the German society, made efforts to reintroduce German. German was discontinued in 1938 as World War II began.

== Push for desegregation ==
In the late 1950s, Dorothy Mae Taylor, the president of two chapters of the Parent Teacher Association who in 1971 became the first African-American woman to serve in the Louisiana House of Representatives, organized a march to the school board to demand equal resources for black children in public schools. The board eventually acquiesced, and the parish increased funding to historically black schools to a level comparable to their white counterparts. Then came the national push for desegregation, particularly through the federal courts and later in the U.S. Congress with the Civil Rights Act of 1964. Racial barriers were dropped, and a new generation of African American leaders won most of the public offices in Orleans Parish.

== Schools ==
Fifty-three public schools opened in New Orleans for the 2006–2007 school year. This number included schools directly administered by the OPSB or the RSD, or schools chartered by the OPSB or the RSD. By November 2006, the system was approaching half of its pre-Katrina enrollment, with 36% of the students enrolled in independent charter schools, 18% in the Algiers Charter School Association charter network, 35% in schools directly administered by the RSD, and 11% in the few remaining schools directly administered by the OPSB. Within fourteen months of Katrina, the majority of students in the NOPS system were, therefore, attending charter schools, a condition that has persisted to the present and is cited with approval by national advocates of charter schools.

For the 2013–2014 school year, the Orleans Parish School Board directly administered 4 schools and oversaw the 16 it chartered. The RSD directly administered 15 schools and supervised the 60 it chartered. Additionally, two schools were chartered directly by the Louisiana Board of Elementary and Secondary Education (BESE).

Since the 2014–2015 school year, all public schools operating under the RSD umbrella within Orleans Parish are independent charter schools.

=== OPSB-chartered schools ===
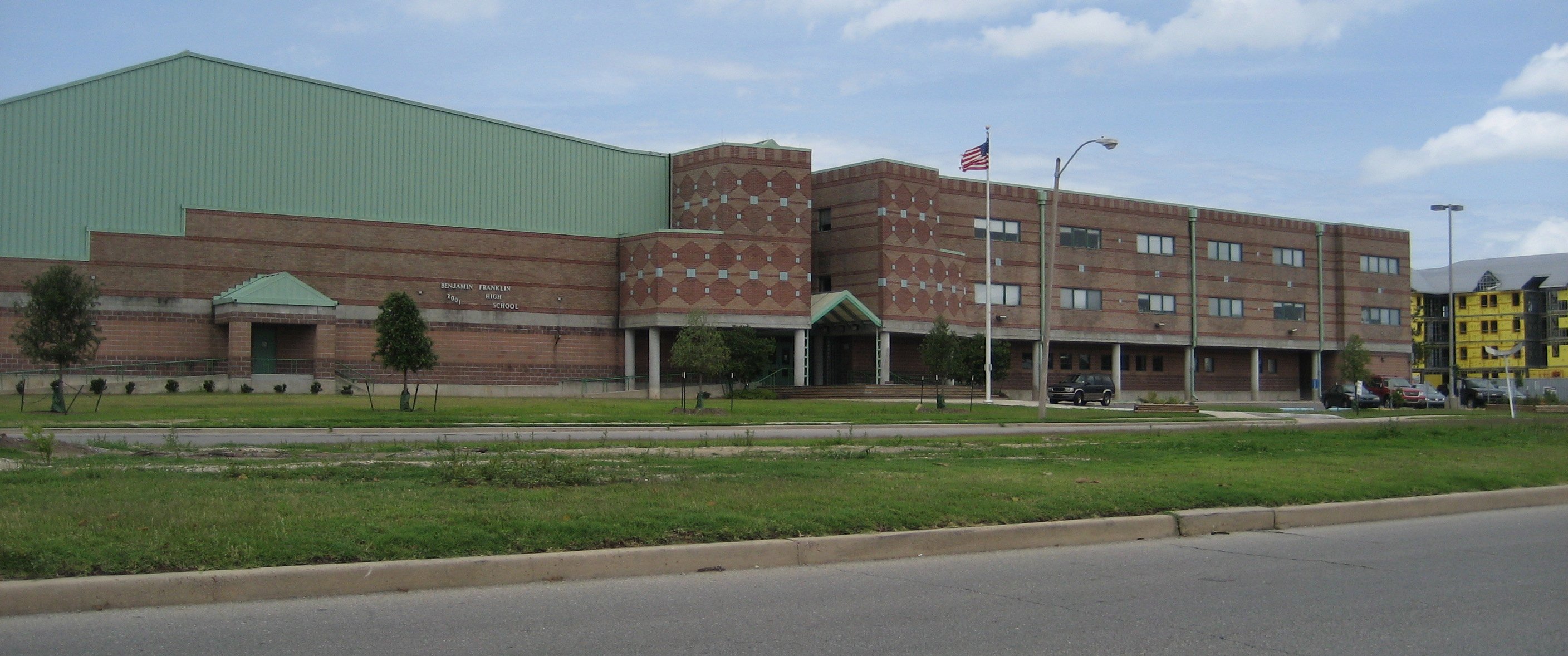
Benjamin Franklin High School

- Audubon Charter School (French Immersion & Montessori)
- Benjamin Franklin High School
- Edward Hynes Charter School
- Encore Academy
- Einstein Charter Middle School at Sarah T. Reed
- Harte Elementary
- Edna Karr High School
- Lake Forest Elementary Charter
- Willow Charter School (formerly Lusher Charter School) (Grades K-12)
- New Orleans Charter Science and Mathematics High School
- Sarah T. Reed High School
- Warren Easton Fundamental High School
- Robert Moton Elementary

=== OPSB-operated schools ===
- Benjamin Franklin Elementary Mathematics and Science School
- Eleanor McMain Secondary Magnet School
- Mary Bethune Elementary
- McDonogh 35 High School
- Mahalia Jackson Elementary

=== RSD-operated schools ===
(Outdated: For the 2014–2015 school year, the RSD directly administers no schools within Orleans Parish.)

- A.P. Tureaud Elementary (Marie Couvent)
- Benjamin Banneker Elementary School
- George Washington Carver High School (Grades 9-12)
- James Johnson Elementary
- John McDonogh High School
- Landry-Walker College and Career Preparatory High School (Grades 9-12, after phasing-out of grades 7 and 8)
- Mary Coghill Elementary
- Murray Henderson Elementary
- Paul Habans Elementary
- Reed High School
- Schaumburg Elementary
- Walter L. Cohen High School

=== RSD-chartered schools ===
- Akili Academy of New Orleans (Grades K-4)
- Andrew Wilson Charter School
- Arise Academy (Charles Drew Elementary campus - Grades PreK-2)
- Arthur Ashe Charter School (Agnes Bauduit Elementary campus - Grades K-8)
- Benjamin E. Mays Preparatory School (G.W. Carver Elementary campus)
- Crescent Leadership Academy
- Dr. King Charter School
- Edward P. Harney Elementary
- Eisenhower Elementary (Operated by the Algiers Charter School Association)
- Esperanza Academy (Operated by Community Academies of New Orleans Network)
- Excel Academy (Grades 9-12)
- Fischer Elementary (Operated by the Algiers Charter School Association)
- Foundation Preparatory (Operated by Community Academies of New Orleans Network)
- Gentilly Terrace Elementary (Operated by the Capital One - New Beginnings Charter School Network)
- Greater Gentilly High School (Grades 9-10)
- Harriet Tubman Elementary (Operated by the Algiers Charter School Association)
- Intercultural Charter School (Mary Queen of Vietnam campus)
- James M. Singleton Charter School (Dryades YMCA)
- KIPP Believe College Prep (Grades 5-8) - Ronald McNair campus
- KIPP Central City Academy
- KIPP Central City Primary
- McDonogh 15 Creative Arts Magnet School (Grades PreK-8)
- Lafayette Academy Lower (Operated by Community Academies of New Orleans Network)
- Lafayette Academy Community Middle(Operated by Community Academies of New Orleans Network)
- Langston Hughes Academy Charter (Operated by NOLA180)
- Martin Berhman Charter Academy (Operated by the Algiers Charter School Association)
- McDonogh 32 Elementary (Operated by the Algiers Charter School Association)
- McDonogh 42 Charter School (Grades PreK-8)
- McDonogh City Park Academy (McDonogh #28) (Grades K-8)
- Medard H. Nelson Charter School (Operated by the Capital One - New Beginnings Charter School Network)
- Miller-McCoy Academy for Math & Business (Edward Livingston campus)
- Morris Jeff Community School (Grade PreK-2nd)
- New Orleans Science & Math Academy (Edward Livingston campus)
- New Orleans College Prep
- Pierre A. Capdau Charter Elementary School (Operated by the Capital One - New Beginnings Charter School Network)
- Pride College Preparatory Academy (F.W. Gregory campus)
- ReNEW Accelerated High School
- ReNEW Cultural Arts Academy
- ReNEW Dolores T. Aaron Academy
- ReNEW SciTech Academy
- S.J. Green Charter School
- Sophie B. Wright Charter Elementary School
- Success Preparatory Academy (Wicker Elementary campus)
- Thurgood Marshall Early College High (Operated by the Capital One - New Beginnings Charter School Network)

=== BESE-chartered schools ===
- International School of Louisiana (Foreign language immersion)
- International High School of New Orleans (Formerly R.E. Rabouin Vocational School for Women "Founded in 1936 and Donated to the New Orleans Public School Board by Louise Jouet Rabuion" Later on a became New Orleans Public High School for all "L.E. Rabouin High School")
- Milestone SABIS Academy of New Orleans
- New Orleans Military and Maritime Academy
- Lycee Francais de la Nouvelle Orleans (French Immersion)

=== Algiers Charter Schools Association ===
The Algiers Charter Schools Association is a system of six charter schools, all RSD affiliates.

- Eisenhower Elementary Academy of Global Studies
- Fischer Elementary
- Martin Behrman Charter Academy for Creative Arts and Sciences (Grades PreK-8)
- McDonogh #32 Literacy Charter School
- L.B. Landry-O.P Walker College Preparatory High School
- Algiers Technology Academy

== Schools that may or may not be open in 2015 ==
- Ray Abrams School
- Avery Alexander Elementary (McDonogh #39)
- Henry W. Allen Elementary (now New Orleans Charter Science and Mathematics High School)
- Alternative High
- Louis Armstrong School (McDonogh #19)
- Israel Augustine Middle (S. J. Peters)
- Agnes Bauduit Elementary (now Arthur Ashe Charter Elementary)
- Andrew J. Bell Jr. High
- Bienville Elementary School
- Stuart R. Bradley School
- Florence J. Chester School
- Charles Colton Middle School
- A.D. Crossman Elementary (now Esperanza Charter School)
- Edward Livingston Middle - as of the 2014–15 school year, is now Edward Livingston High School
- KIPP Renaissance High School, formerly Francis T. Nicholls High School
- Alcee Fortier High School
- Jean Gordon Elementary
- Oretha Castle Haley School (Gayarre)
- John W. Hoffman School
- Andrew Jackson School (now the International School of Louisiana)
- Morris F.X. Jeff Elementary (McDonogh #31)
- Valena C. Jones Elementary
- Barbara C. Jordan School (McDonogh #40)
- John F. Kennedy High
- Thomy Lafon School
- Lake Area Middle (H.C. Schaumburg Elementary)
- Alfred Lawless High
- Little Woods School
- Johnson C. Lockett School
- McDonogh 7 (housing Andrew Wilson charter through early 2010)
- George O. Mondy Elementary
- George O. Mondy School (William O. Rogers)
- Ernest N. Morial Elementary
- New Orleans East Educational Center
- NOPS Technology Center
- Mildred Osborne Elementary
- Parkview Fundamental Magnet (Claiborne)
- Edward H. Phillips Jr. High
- Julius Rosenwald Accelerated Elementary (now Algiers Technology Academy)
- John A. Shaw School
- Sherwood Forest School
- Mary Church Terrell Magnet
- Urban League Street Academy
- Village de l'Est Elementary School (now Einstein Charter School)
- Booker T. Washington High School (scheduled to become a vocational trade school, pre-Katrina)
- O. Perry Walker College and Career Preparatory High School and Community Center—Effective with the 2013–14 school year, the school merged into the Landry-Walker College and Career Preparatory High School, on the new Landry campus
- Vorice Jackson Waters Elementary
- Phillis Wheatley Elementary School
- Sylvanie Williams School
- Carter G. Woodson Middle

== Former schools ==
RSD chartered:

- Sojourner Truth Academy

Pre-Katrina:

- German High School, in the early 1850s the German American community of New Orleans made plans to establish the school in the Third District of New Orleans. It was nonsectarian and had no religious instruction. The school closed during a yellow fever epidemic in 1853

== See also ==
- History of New Orleans
- New Orleans Public Library
