= Recovery School District =

Special statewide school district in Louisiana, US

Location
- United States

District information
- Type: Public
- Motto: Excellence.Equity.Community.
- Grades: Pre-K–12
- Established: 2003
- Superintendent: Patrick Dobard
- NCES District ID: 2200054

Other information
- Website: www.rsdla.net

Recovery School District (RSD) is a special statewide school district administered by the Louisiana Department of Education. Created by legislation enacted in 2003, the RSD is designed to take underperforming schools and transform and make them effective in educating children.

While the majority of RSD-supervised schools were within New Orleans and were largely under the administration of the Orleans Parish School Board pre-Katrina, the RSD has also taken over schools in East Baton Rouge, Caddo and Pointe Coupee parishes, reflecting its statewide authority and full name, the Recovery School District of Louisiana (RSDLA). As of 2012 it was the fifth largest school district in Louisiana by student population. Orleans parish schools returned the OPSB in 2018.

The Recovery School District's supervisory board is Louisiana Board of Elementary and Secondary Education (BESE). The RSD has two offices, the one in New Orleans serves schools in Greater New Orleans and the one in Baton Rouge serves other areas.

== History ==
During the 2003 regular legislative session, the Louisiana Legislature passed Act 9 to create the Recovery School District (RSD) to take over the operations of failing schools, defined as schools that do not meet the minimum academic standards for at least four consecutive years. The legislation was signed into law in May of that year by Governor of Louisiana Kathleen Blanco.

Pierre Capdau School in New Orleans became the state's first takeover school in 2004, and subsequently became Louisiana's first RSD charter school, known as a Type 5 charter school. In August 2004, the school opened as Pierre Capdau-UNO Charter School under the management of the New Beginnings Foundation and the University of New Orleans. In the spring of 2005, four additional New Orleans schools were taken over by the state, and turned over to charter school operators: Medard Nelson, Samuel Green, Phillips, and Sophie B. Wright.

Hurricane Katrina struck New Orleans on August 29, 2005, bringing near total devastation to the city and damaging or destroying more than 100 of the city's 128 school buildings.

In the face of uncertainties about the future of schools in the city, the Louisiana Legislature acted by passing Act 35. Eventually, the Recovery School District (RSD) took over 102 out of 126 schools from the Orleans Parish School Board (OPSB) in late-November 2005. Of the remaining 24 schools, seven were uninhabitable, 12 became charters, and five remained directly managed by OPSB.

In 2018, the RSD schools in New Orleans returned to the supervision of the OPSB.

== RSD school data ==
=== Achievement, 2014–15 ===
- RSD schools outpace the state with a 29 percentage point increase from 2008 to 2014 in the percent of students performing at basic and above, compared to a 9 percentage point increase across the state
- In 4th and 8th grade (retention grades), proficiency citywide has more than doubled in both English language arts and math
- More students are prepared for college and career with 39% of RSD 12th graders scoring 18+ on ACT in 2011 to 49% of students in 2014

=== Demographics, 2014–15 ===
Though enrollment has been steadily increasing, student enrollment in New Orleans is still only about 70% of pre-katrina levels.

- RSD serves 90% economically disadvantaged students
- RSD serves over 11% special education students
- RSD serves just over 95% African American students

=== New Orleans school governance, 2015–16 ===
- The Recovery School District governed 52 charter schools, under the direction of Superintendent Patrick Dobard. There are no longer any direct-run RSD schools
- The Louisiana Board of Elementary and Secondary Education governed 4 charter schools, under the direction of State Superintendent John White
- The Louisiana Legislature governed 1 independent school, the New Orleans Center for Creative Arts
- The Orleans Parish School Board governed 24 schools—6 district-run, 18 charters, under the direction of Superintendent Henderson Lewis Jr.

== Leadership ==
Since January 2012, the Recovery School District has been led by Patrick Dobard, former deputy superintendent for the Recovery School District. In his previous position, Dobard oversaw all community engagement and outreach activities, as well as establishing and implementing education policy for the Recovery School District (RSD).

== See also ==
- New Orleans Public Schools
- Firstline Schools
- Collegiate Academies
