= Louisiana High School Athletic Association =

Athletic regulatory body in the state of Louisiana

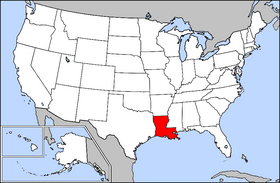
- Abbreviation: LHSAA
- Formation: 1920 (106 years ago)
- Type: Volunteer
- Legal status: Association
- Purpose: Athletic/Educational
- Headquarters: 12720 Old Hammond Highway; Baton Rouge, LA 70816
- Region served: Louisiana
- Members: 410+ schools
- Executive Director: Eddie Bonine
- Affiliations: National Federation of State High School Associations
- Staff: 20
- Website: LHSAA.org
- Remarks: (225) 296-5882

The Louisiana High School Athletic Association (LHSAA) is the agency that regulates and promotes the interscholastic athletic competitions of all high schools in the U.S. state of Louisiana.

== Organization ==
LHSAA was founded in Baton Rouge, Louisiana, in October 1920. The LHSAA's main office was in Hammond from 1953 until 1972, when it returned to Baton Rouge.

The LHSAA is governed by an executive director and an executive committee, with representatives from each of the association's class divisions. LHSAA member schools include public, private, and parochial schools throughout the state. LHSAA is affiliated with the National Federation of State High School Associations.

As of 1996, LHSAA included 410 member schools and an annual certification of approximately 70,000 student athletes each year.

LHSAA is divided into nine statewide classes and divisions, based on each school's student enrollment for grades nine through twelve: Classes 5A, 4A, 3A, 2A, 1A, and Divisions I, II, III, and IV. Divisions are made up of schools of a private/religious nature; the smallest schools are all either members of Class 1A or Division IV. Classes 2A through 5A and Divisions II through IV may include some schools that do not play football, including schools that have all-girl enrollments. Schools with single-gender enrollments have their enrollment numbers doubled for classification purposes.

LHSAA has twenty-three competitive sports programs, twelve for boys and eleven for girls. The LHSAA sports programs are Baseball, Softball, Basketball, Swimming, Bowling, Tennis, Cross Country, Indoor Track and Field, Outdoor Track and Field, Football, Golf, Volleyball, Gymnastics, Wrestling, and Soccer. Since 2013, "non-select" (zoned public schools) and "select" (private schools, public magnet schools and public schools in parishes with open enrollment) schools have competed in separate playoffs for football. This split was expanded in 2016 to include basketball, baseball and softball.

Unlike peer organizations in many other states (including Kansas, Missouri, Nebraska and Texas), the LHSAA does not sanction non-athletic activities such as speech and debate, music and drama.

== History ==
Before 1935, Louisiana had organized athletic programs for white children only. In 1935 William Gray of Southern University established the Louisiana Interscholastic Athletic and Literary Association (LIALO) to provide an organization for the African-American students of the state. This organization was absorbed into the LHSAA in 1969 and 1970 when the federal courts forced Louisiana to integrate the public schools. The LHSAA has not recognized the accomplishments or records of LIALO schools and their students pre-integration, and many of those records are lost.

In 1990, Louisiana became the first state in the nation to include a wheelchair division in its state track and field competition for disabled student athletes.

Hurricane Katrina and Hurricane Rita hit Southern Louisiana at the beginning of the 2005 high school football season. The evacuation of New Orleans and other communities forced dozens of high schools to close for months, and several campuses were damaged or destroyed by flooding and wind damage. The football season was not canceled, but several games were postponed or canceled. Some schools in the disaster area were forced to withdraw from competition. Most public schools in Orleans Parish, St. Bernard Parish, and Plaquemines Parish were so badly damaged that they were forced to cancel their entire school year. Other disaster-area schools combined to form joint teams in fall of 2005 and spring of 2006. By the 2006 school year, most of the affected LHSAA schools were able to compete under their own school teams.

== Awards ==
The Southern Quality Ford Cup is the Louisiana High School Athletic Association's (LHSAA) All Sports Award that recognizes the leading overall athletic program in each of the LHSAA's seven classes. The competition is based on a school's performance in the 23 sports governed by the LHSAA. Any team that finishes in one of the top four places in the state earns points towards a school's quest for the cup. At the end of the academic year, the school that has accumulated the most points in its class is presented with the award.

== Commissioners and executive directors ==
- T.H. "Muddy" Waters (1953–1971)
- Frank Spruiell (1971–1983)
- Tommy Henry (1983–2008)
- Kenny Henderson (2008–2015)
- Eddie Bonine (2015–present)

== See also ==
- List of Louisiana high school athletic districts
- Louisiana Independent School Association
- Midsouth Association of Independent Schools
- NFHS
