= List of schools in New Orleans =

This is a list of schools in New Orleans.

== Private schools ==
=== K-12 schools ===
- Academy of the Sacred Heart - all-female
- Holy Cross High School - all-male
- Isidore Newman School
- McGehee School - all-female
- Saint Mary's Academy - all-female K-12 and separate male grade 4-7 school
- Ursuline Academy - all-female

=== High schools ===
- Brother Martin High School - all-male
- Cabrini High School - all-female
- De La Salle High School - co-ed
- Jesuit High School - all-male
- Mount Carmel Academy - all-female
- St. Augustine High School - all-male
- St. Katharine Drexel Preparatory School - all-female
- St. Mary's Dominican High School - all-female

=== K-7 schools ===
- Christian Brothers School
  - Includes two campuses: Canal Street Campus (former St. Anthony of Padua School) in Mid-City, and the City Park (original) campus.
  - The school has a PK-4 coeducational elementary school in both locations, an all girls' 5-7 middle school in Canal Street, and an all boys' 5-7 middle school in City Park.
  - It first opened in 1967. Previously Christian Brothers only had middle school and was all boys. In 2013 the archdiocese stated that it would no longer permit combined middle and high schools and standalone middle schools. In 2014 Christian Brothers and St. Anthony of Padua School announced they would merge effective fall 2016. In 2014 it had 360 students.
- Ecole Bilingue de la Nouvelle-Orléans
- Good Shepherd Nativity Mission
- Holy Name of Jesus School
- Resurrection of Our Lord School
- St. Alphonsus School
- St. Andrew the Apostle School
- St. Benedict the Moor School
- St. Dominic School
- St. Joan of Arc School
- St. Leo the Great
- St. Pius X School
- St. Rita School
- St. Stephen School
- Stuart Hall School

=== Former schools ===
- Redeemer-Seton High School - closed in 2006
- Xavier University Preparatory School
- Holy Ghost School (Uptown) - It was a part of the Katharine Drexel Parish, and accepted school vouchers. It closed in 2015; it had 166 students that year.
- Immaculate Heart of Mary School
- Our Lady of Lourdes School
- Our Lady of the Rosary School - The building has a capacity of 500. It housed the Morris Jeff Community School, and after that one moved out in 2015, Bricolage Academy of New Orleans.
- St. Francis of Assisi School - The building was later leased by the charter school Milestone SABIS Academy. In November 2011 St. Francis of Assisi Church agreed to lease its school building to another charter school, Lycée Français de la Nouvelle-Orléans. The Milestone SABIS school leadership learned of the change through the media.
- St. Anthony of Padua School - merging with Christian Brothers in the 2016-2017 school year
- St. Peter Claver School - It was in Tremé. It was established in 1921, and closed in 2019. In its final year it had 147 students, while the archdiocese's expected enrollment was 200. At the time its budget shortfall was $83,000. Its tuition usually ranged from $5,400 to $5,900 during the 2017-2018 school year.
- St. Louis Cathedral School
- St. Monica School - Master P attended this school. In 1999 it had 125 students. That year the archdiocese leadership stated that it was considering closing the school and merging it into Our Lady of Lourdes. Master P sent $250,000 to the school so it could remain in operation. Hurricane Katrina damaged the school and its affiliated church in 2005; by 2011 the archdiocese sold the property for the buildings to be razed.
- St. Paul the Apostle School
- St. Raymond School
- St. Simon Peter School
