= Caroline Hunter =

American activist and chemist

- Born: September 5, 1946 (age 79); New Orleans, Louisiana
- Occupations: Anti-Apartheid activist and educator
- Years active: 1970-
- Known for: The Polaroid Revolutionary Workers Movement
- Spouse: Ken Williams (deceased)
- Awards: Dr. Effie Jones Humanitarian Award; Rosa Parks Memorial Award; Amandla Award; Louise Gaskins Lifetime Civil Rights Award

Caroline Hunter (born September 5, 1946, in New Orleans, Louisiana) is an American activist, chemist and educator who has served on the Cambridge Public School Committee since 2022. In her early career, she co-founded the Polaroid Revolutionary Workers Movement, which petitioned the Polaroid Corporation to end its support of South African apartheid.

== Early life ==
Hunter was born into a Black Catholic family on September 5, 1946, in New Orleans, Louisiana. During her upbringing during segregation, she was legally prevented from sitting at the front of the bus, trying on clothes in the department stores and eating at the lunch counter. As a 10th grader attending Xavier University Preparatory School Hunter was moved by reading the novel Cry, the Beloved Country which depicts the oppression of South African apartheid. She memorized and copied passages from the book into her other textbooks. Hunter proceeded to Xavier University of Louisiana, where she earned a degree in Chemistry.

== Career ==
=== Polaroid Revolutionary Workers Movement (1970–1977) ===
After college, Hunter worked as a research bench chemist for the Polaroid Corporation in Cambridge, Massachusetts. During this period, she became the first African American woman to challenge her employer’s South African investments. In 1970, Hunter and her co-worker, future husband Ken Williams, discovered the involvement of their employer, Polaroid, in the South African apartheid system as the producer of the passbook photos used to identify black individuals in South Africa. To pressure Polaroid to divest from South Africa, Hunter and Williams created the Polaroid Revolutionary Worker Movement (PRWM). Through the PRWM, Hunter and Williams organized a boycott against the corporation.

Consequently, Polaroid banned all sales to the government, including the military and police, and promised to raise wages and increase job training at its distributors. The plan did not pacify the PRWM, however, and, in 1971, Hunter testified before the United Nations advocating a boycott of Polaroid products. Polaroid proceeded to fire both Hunter and Williams. As a result of protests, a community group in Boston donated $10,000 it received from Polaroid to South African liberation movements. In 1977, it became public Polaroid film was being sold by the distributor Frank and Hirsch to the South African government for use in the "passbook" in violation of Polaroid's policy. This ended Polaroid's relationship with its distributor and all direct sales to South Africa.

=== Subsequent career ===
Following her involvement in the PRWM, Hunter went on to work as an educator. She was a secondary science and math teacher in Boston, Massachusetts’s public high school system, volunteering in school-community projects for at-risk youth, advocacy and support for diverse parents, and elimination of the achievement gap. This included summer and Saturday workshops.

In 1998, after her husband, Ken Williams, died, she and her daughter, Lisette, founded the Ken Williams Memorial Scholarship Fund (KWMS), for which Hunter served as secretary and annual golf tournament coordinator. The KWMS Fund has awarded more than $30,000 in college scholarships to needy high school students from Cambridge and Martha’s Vineyard for outstanding social justice work and art. In 1999, she earned her Master of Education degree from Harvard University and became assistant principal of the Cambridge Rindge and Latin School.

Hunter was elected to the Cambridge Public School Committee in 2022. She was vice chair as of June 2025.

== Recognition ==
Hunter was invited to give the keynote at the Dr. Effie Jones Memorial Luncheon at the AASA National Conference on Education, at the Music City Center in Nashville, Tennessee, and received the Dr. Effie Jones Humanitarian Award from the American Association of School Administrators on February 14, 2014. She also received the 2012 Rosa Parks Memorial Award from the National Education Association for leading the effort that led to sanctions against apartheid in South Africa. The South African Partners presented the Amandla Award to Hunter in 2012, and the Massachusetts Teachers Association presented her the Louise Gaskins Lifetime Civil Rights Award in 2011.
