= Uptown New Orleans =

Coordinates: 29.9547°N 90.1209°W

- Uptown New Orleans Historic District
- U.S. National Register of Historic Places
- U.S. Historic district
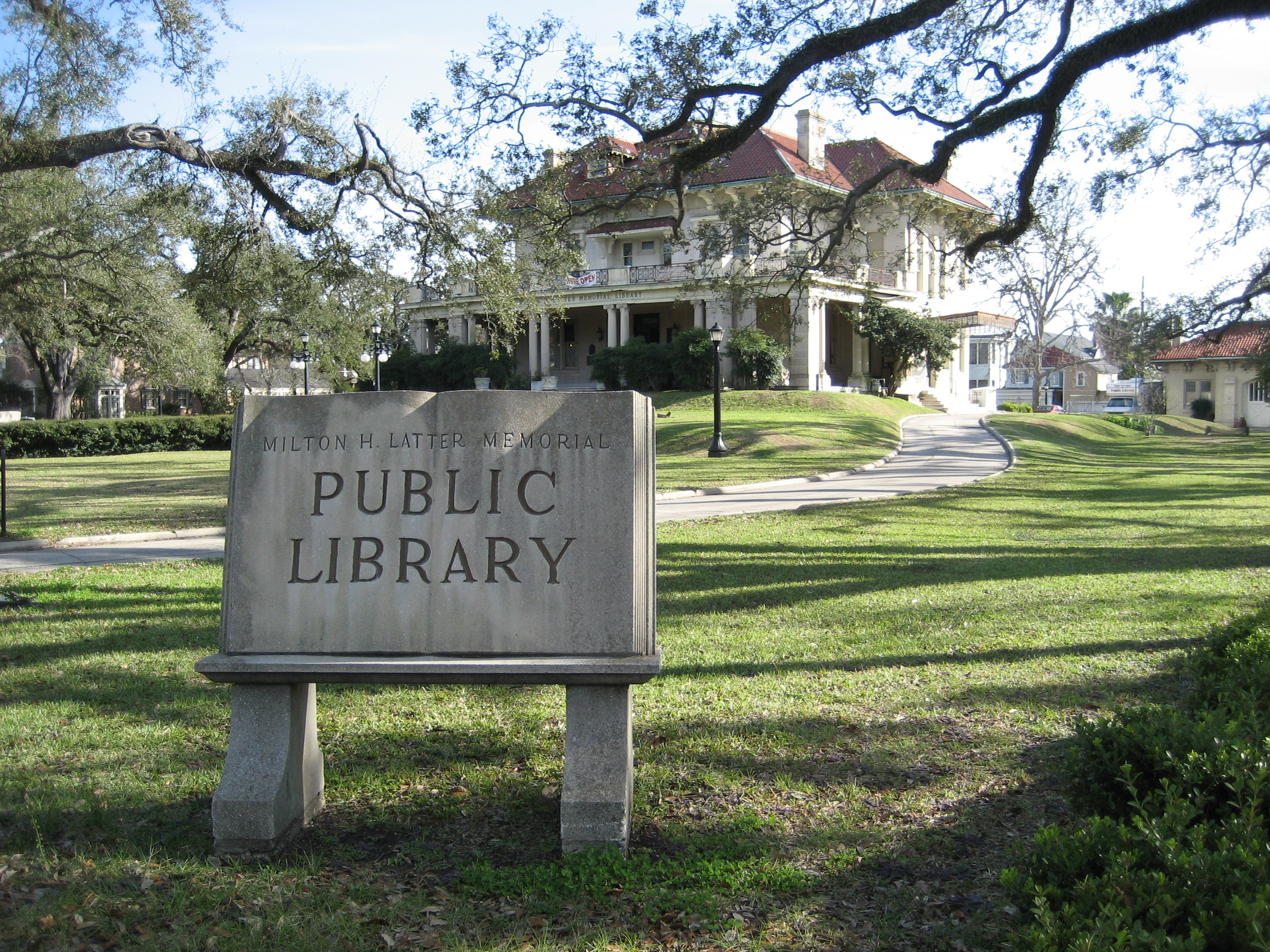
- The Latter Memorial Library, a former private mansion built in 1907, sits on the corner of St. Charles Avenue and Soniat St.

- Location within Louisiana Location within the United States
- Location: New Orleans, Louisiana, United States
- Architect: Multiple
- Architectural style: mid-19th-century Revival, late 19th- and 20th-century Revivals, late Victorian, government housing
- NRHP reference No.: 85001417
- Added to NRHP: July 3, 1985

Uptown is a section of New Orleans, Louisiana, United States, on the east bank of the Mississippi River, encompassing a number of neighborhoods (including the similarly named and smaller Uptown area) between the French Quarter and the Jefferson Parish line. It remains an area of mixed residential and small commercial properties, with a wealth of 19th-century architecture. It includes part or all of Uptown New Orleans Historic District, which is listed on the National Register of Historic Places.

== Boundaries and definitions ==
In modern times, there are several entities called "Uptown". Most of these place the southern border at the Mississippi River and the northern roughly at Claiborne Avenue, but differ on the western and eastern borders.

- The broadest modern definition spans from the western city border with Jefferson Parish eastwards to the Pontchartrain Expressway, beyond which is the modern Central Business District.
- The federal Uptown New Orleans Historic District spans roughly from Lowerline Avenue in the west to Louisiana Avenue in the east. This excludes areas to the west and east that are parts of other federal historic districts: Carrollton, the Garden District, the Irish Channel, Central City, and the Lower Garden District; as well as some areas immediately at or near the waterfront that are modern developments.
- The City of New Orleans Planning District 3, named "Uptown and Carrollton", encompasses the western half of the broader Uptown, from Napoleon Avenue westward. The eastern part is part of Planning District 2, "Central City/Garden District".
- The official City of New Orleans neighborhood of Uptown is much smaller, ranging from Jefferson Avenue at its west to Napoleon Avenue at its east, and Magazine Street at its south to Lasalle Street at its north.

Historically, uptown was a direction, meaning movement in the direction against the flow of the Mississippi. After the Louisiana Purchase, many settlers from other parts of the United States developed their homes and businesses in the area upriver from the older Creole city.

During the 19th century Canal Street was known as the dividing line between uptown and downtown New Orleans, the boundary between the predominantly Francophone area downriver and the predominantly Anglophone area upriver. Central Business District, historically also known as the "Old American Quarter," was the earliest area called "Uptown New Orleans," though many no longer include it in their definition of Uptown. The very broadest definition of Uptown, historically, thus included everything upriver from Canal Street, which would encompass about one-third of the city.

The U.S. Postal Service operates an Uptown Station.

== Early history ==
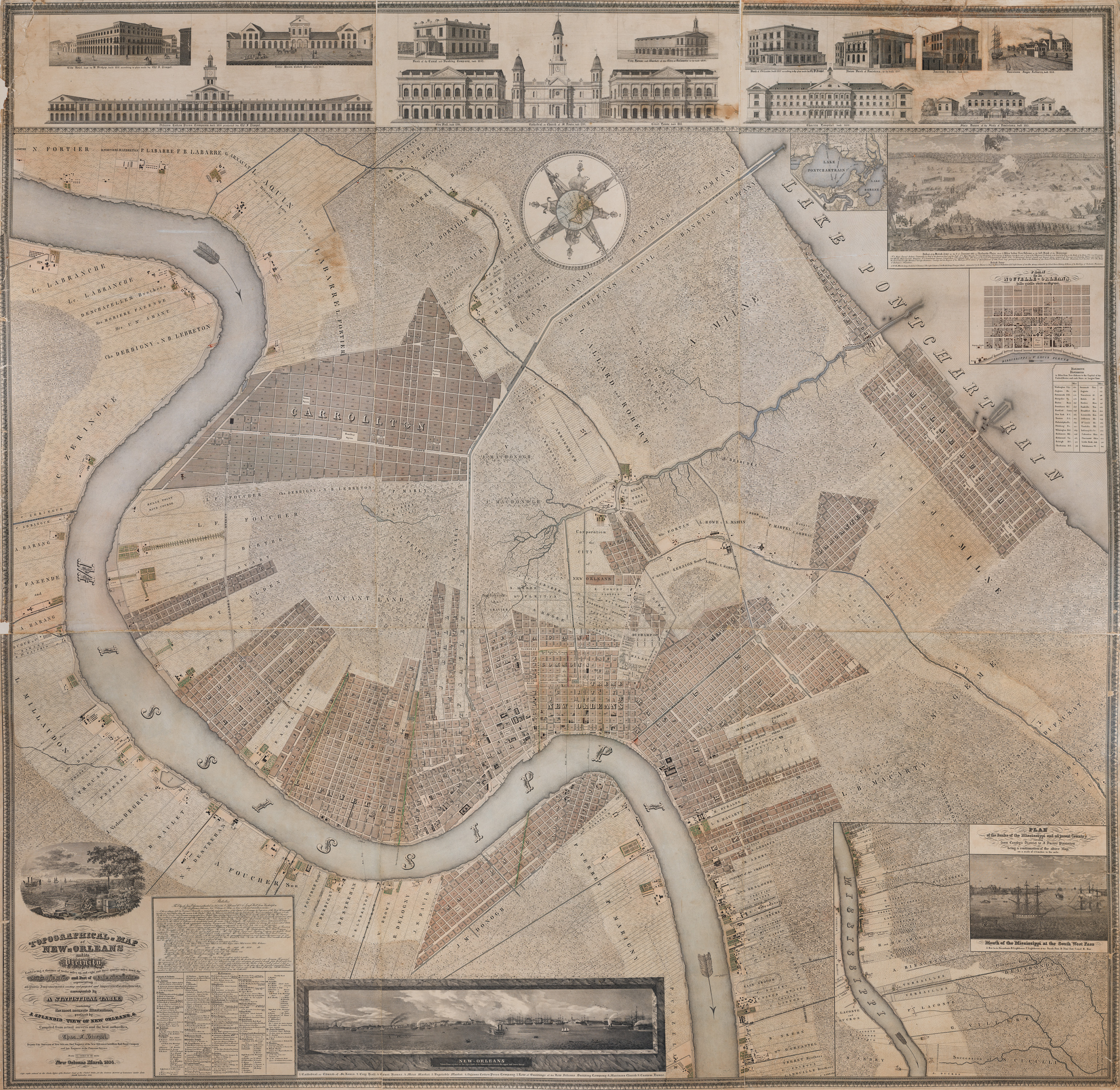
An 1834 map showing early faubourgs

Uptown was developed during the 19th century, mostly from land that had been plantations in the Colonial era. Several sections were developed as separate towns, like Lafayette, Jefferson City, Greenville, and Carrollton. For much of the 19th century most of what is now Uptown belonged to Jefferson Parish.

People from other parts of the United States settled uptown in the 19th century, joined by immigrants, notably from Italy, Ireland, and Germany. Uptown has always had a sizable African American population. Census data shows that ethnically and racially mixed city blocks were common in the 19th and early 20th centuries, which continues to be the case with much of Uptown.

New Orleans and Orleans Parish gradually annexed Lafayette (not to be confused with the present city of the same name in Lafayette Parish), Carrollton, and other communities from the neighboring Parish. This newly absorbed area became known as uptown New Orleans. Lafayette was the first annexed, in 1852, moving the New Orleans city limit upriver to Toledano Street. In 1870, New Orleans annexed Jefferson City, Hurstville, Bloomingdale, Burtheville, Greenville, and the undeveloped area between the last two that would later become Audubon Park. Carrollton was annexed in 1874.

=== City of Lafayette ===
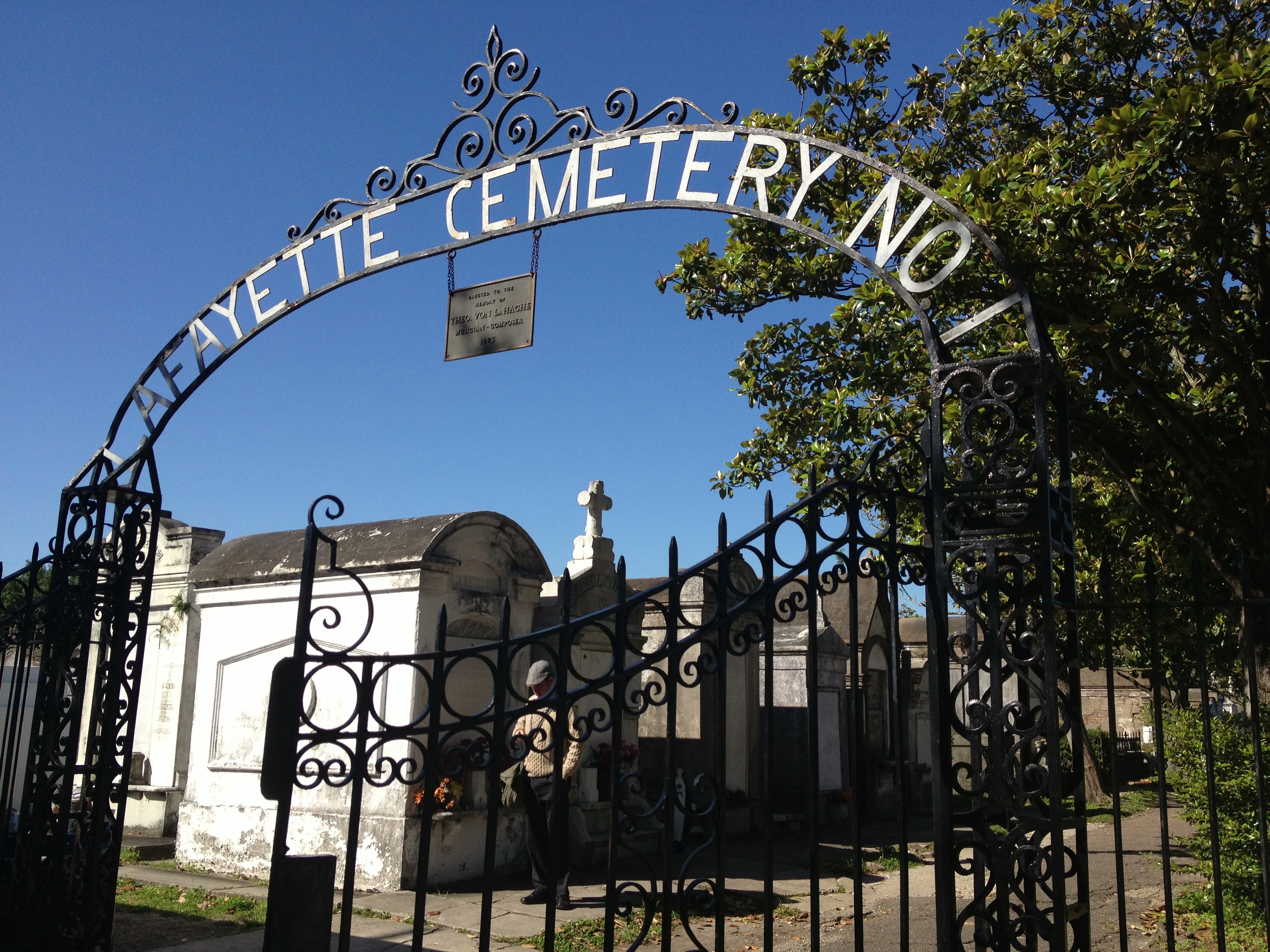
The front gates to Lafayette Cemetery No. 1

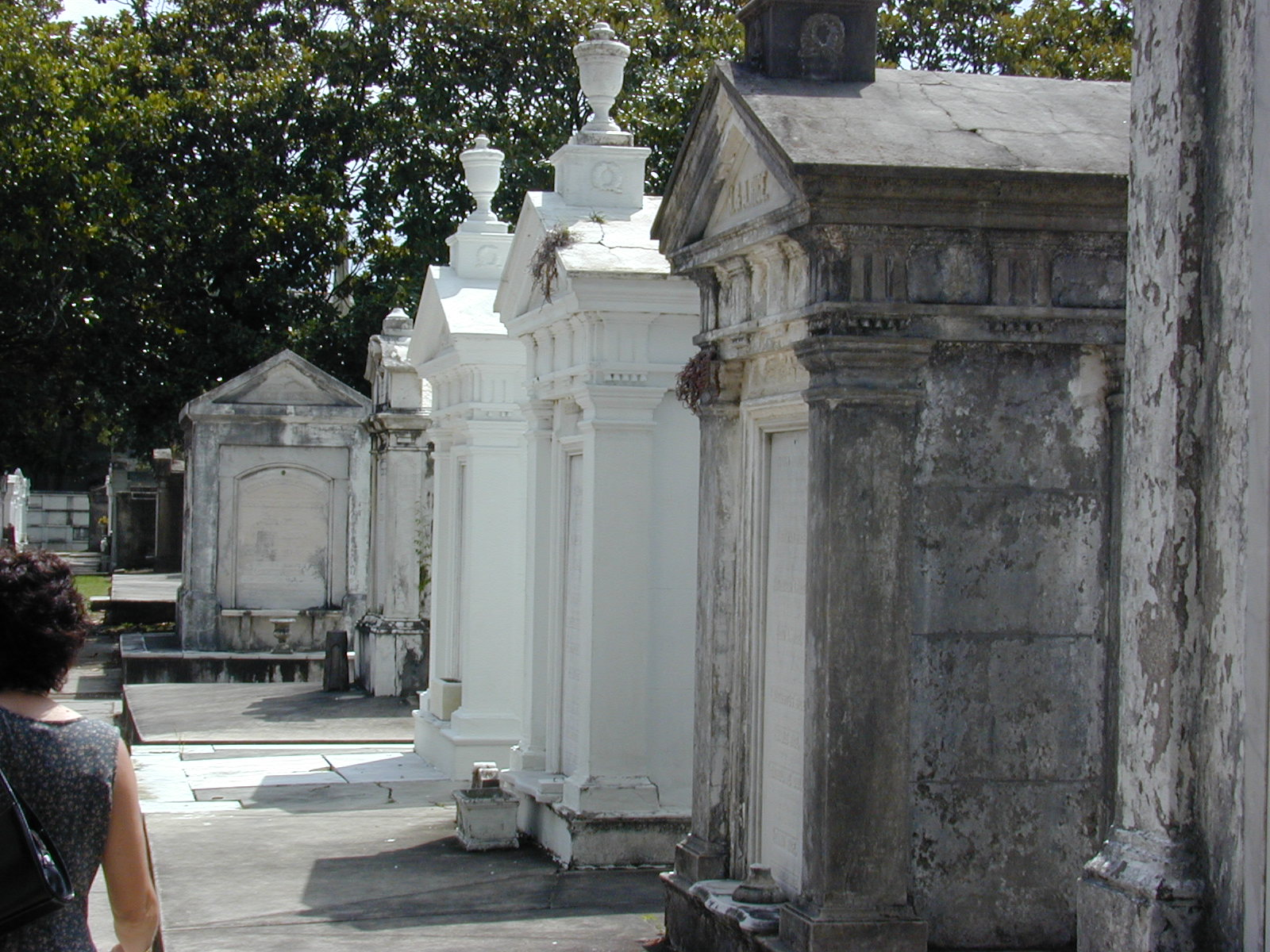
Tombs in Lafayette Cemetery No. 1

Several small settlements grew up at steamboat landings a few miles upstream of New Orleans. The original Lafayette began as one of these. The sugar plantation once owned by François Livaudais, situated in Jefferson Parish along the Mississippi River between the present Philip, Pleasant, and LaSalle streets, was sold to developers in 1832. The Livaudais Plantation was subdivided and incorporated in April 1833 as the City of Lafayette and included the land which would later become known as the Garden District. The center of town was around Jackson Avenue.

Lafayette was also the site of the original Jefferson Parish courthouse. The New Orleans and Carrollton Railroad, also incorporated in 1833, constructed a spur from the main line along Nyades Street (now St. Charles Avenue) down Jackson Avenue. Lafayette annexed Faubourg Delassize in 1844, bringing that city's boundary with New Orleans to Toledano Street. In 1852, New Orleans annexed Lafayette, moving the New Orleans city limit upriver to Toledano Street. The seat of Jefferson Parish moved to the City of Carrollton. However, the boundary between Jefferson Parish and Orleans Parish remained at Felicity Street until 1870, when it was moved to Lowerline Street.

Cornelius Hurst, developer of Faubourg Hurstville, sold a square block to the City of Lafayette for a cemetery in 1833. Now known as Lafayette Cemetery No. 1, the land is bounded by Washington Avenue, 6th Street, Coliseum Street and Prytania Street. In 1972, this cemetery was added to the National Register of Historical Places, but in 1996 it was listed in the 1996 World Monuments Watch by the World Monuments Fund. The Fund helped in the creation of a preservation plan with assistance from American Express. In 2010, the Louisiana Landmarks Society rated Lafayette Cemetery No. 1 as one of the nine most endangered New Orleans landmarks. It said that two large oak trees threatened to destroy 30 tombs. The society also cited inadequate grounds keeping, improper maintenance, and damage by movie film crews as contributing to this decline.

=== Jefferson City ===
By 1850, seven other faubourgs had been created: Plaisance, Delachaise, St. Joseph, East and West Bouligny, Avart, and Rickerville. These combined to form Jefferson City, which extended between Toledano and Joseph Streets. Rickerville had been created March 23, 1849, and named for Samuel Ricker, one of the land owners; it adjoined Hurstville along Joseph Street and extended along the river to Peters (now Jefferson), then inland to Pitt Street.

Note that this is not the same location as the present day Jefferson, Louisiana.

=== Hurstville and Bloomingdale ===
Faubourg Hurstville was the first faubourg of what is now Uptown New Orleans, created in 1833 by Cornelius Hurst, a wealthy businessman. It ran along the Mississippi River from Joseph Street to "the Bloomingdale Line" between Eleonore Street and State Street, continuing inland to Claiborne Avenue. The land had been part of a plantation once owned by Jean-Baptiste François LeBreton.

Cornelius Hurst, Pierre Joseph Tricou, and Julie Robert Avart had bought the plantation in 1831, dividing it into three equal parts. Hurst commissioned a plantation house to be built on his land in 1832. The site of this house later became the corner of Tchoupitoulas and Joseph Streets. The house was moved in 1922 to a site at 3 Garden Lane. Tricou sold his part to Hurst in 1832. Hurst's property was surveyed for development into Faubourg Hurstville. Avart's portion became Faubourg Bloomingdale in 1841.

Hurst named three streets perpendicular to the Mississippi River Eleonore, Arabella, and Joseph for his wife, daughter, and son, respectively. He named the fourth street Nashville, as part of his plan to get the New Orleans & Nashville Railroad to construct a spur into his faubourg. However, both Hurst and the railroad went bankrupt during the Panic of 1837, and the proposed track was not built.

Although Hurst himself is largely forgotten, his name lives on as Hurst Street, which crosses the four streets named above. The name Hurstville is still used to identify the former faubourg; and as of 2010, still appears in local news items and real estate listings. The neighborhood streets are almost entirely residential.

=== Burtheville ===
This faubourg was once farmland owned by Dominique François Burthe, who bought the property from Bernard de Marigny in 1831. Burthe subdivided the property in 1851 to create Burtheville. It was bounded by the river and Claiborne Avenue, and present day Audubon Park to between Webster and State streets. An 1867–1868 directory for New Orleans commented that Burtheville was very sparsely populated.

The United States Marine Hospital was built at the corner of Henry Clay and Tchoupitoulas Streets in 1858, which was expanded in the 20th century to become the U.S. Public Health Service Hospital. In 1983, after the state of Louisiana acquired the property, this facility became the New Orleans Adolescent Hospital. It was later acquired by Manning Family Children's

=== Greenville ===
Greenville was a city formerly in Jefferson Parish bounded by the present-day Audubon Park and Lowerline Street, and extended from the river to St. Charles Avenue. The city was annexed by New Orleans and became part of Orleans Parish. Although the name of Greenville is sometimes used in referring to a neighborhood in Uptown New Orleans, it should not be confused with the community of the same name in Catahoula Parish, Louisiana.

=== Carrollton ===
Carrollton was historically a separate town, laid out in 1833 and incorporated on March 10, 1845. Carrollton was annexed by New Orleans in 1874 (becoming the city's 16th and 17th Wards), but it has long retained some elements of distinct identity.

Historically the boundaries of the city of Carrollton were the Mississippi River, the downriver border of Jefferson Parish, Louisiana, Fig Street, and Lowerline Street. The area on the river side of Claiborne Avenue is sometimes referred to as "Old Carrollton". The incorporation of Carrollton created an apparent anomaly in New Orleans street names; Lowerline is upriver from Upperline Street, which was originally the upriver boundary of another suburb annexed in the 1850s.

== Hurricane Katrina ==
Like most of the oldest parts of the city developed before 1900 on the city's higher ground, the majority of Uptown had very little flooding from Katrina For this reason, the portion of New Orleans along the riverfront stretching from the Bywater to Carrollton and including about half of Uptown was sometimes called "the Sliver by the River" and "Isle of Denial." High water did affect some portions of Uptown, especially the areas closer to Claiborne Avenue, in some places severely. While 20th-century floods such as from the 1909 hurricane and the May 1995 Louisiana flood affected Uptown, the post-Katrina flooding was worse than anything seen since Sauvé's Crevasse in 1849.

In these areas many old homes were built on piers 0.9 to 1.2 meters (3.0 to 3.9 ft) above street level to insure against the occasional disastrous flood. These piers proved to be insufficiently elevated, as the flood water rose an additional 30 to 60 cm (one to two feet). However, the area on the river side of St. Charles Avenue, and some sections farther back, escaped flooding. This was the single largest area of New Orleans to be spared the levee-disaster flood.

For months early in the post-Katrina recovery, Magazine Street became a commercial hub of New Orleans, with many businesses owned and run by locals reopening before chain stores in the metro area.

== Cityscape ==
=== Roads ===
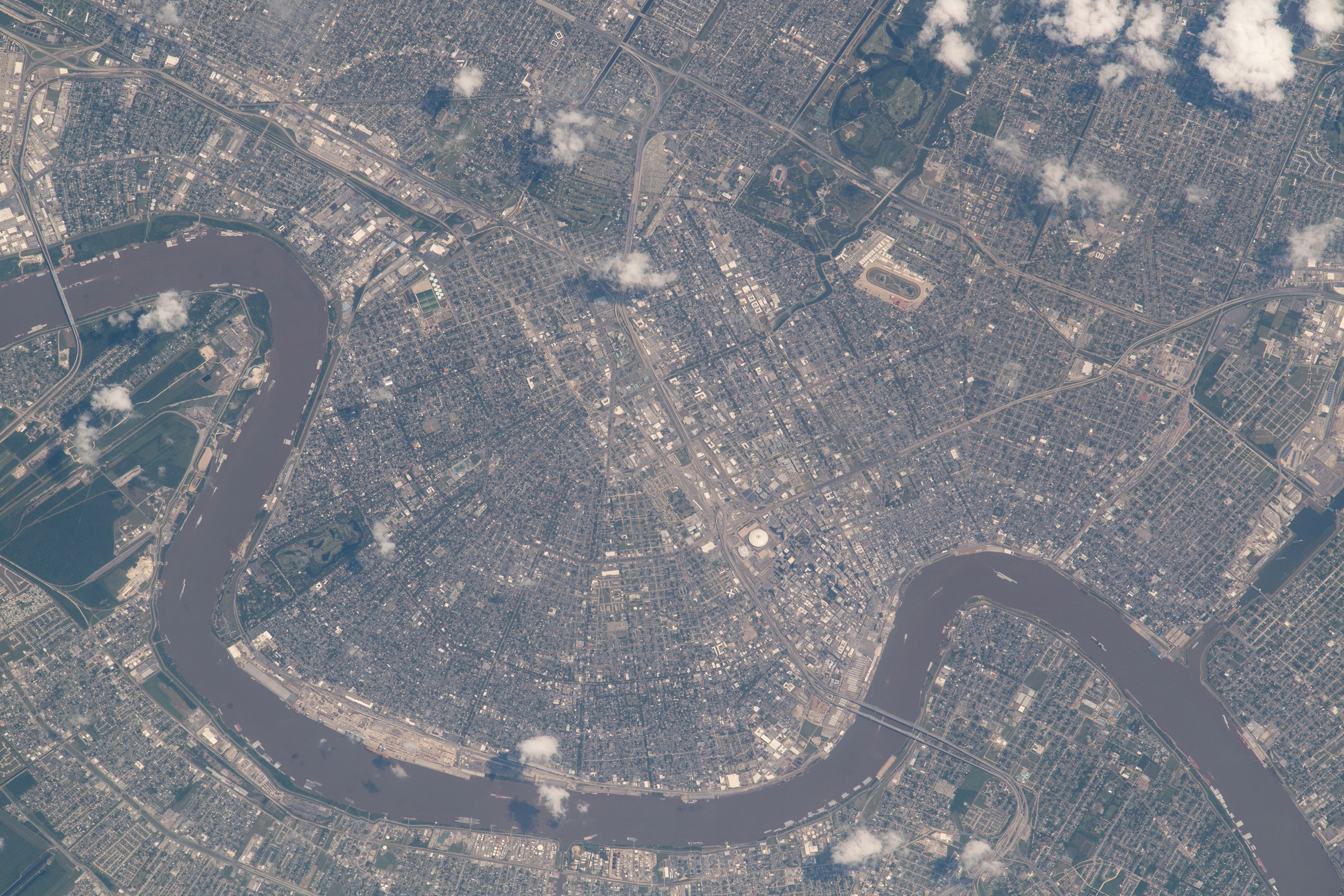
View of Uptown and vicinity from the International Space Station on June 28, 2022. Many streets run perpendicular to the river.

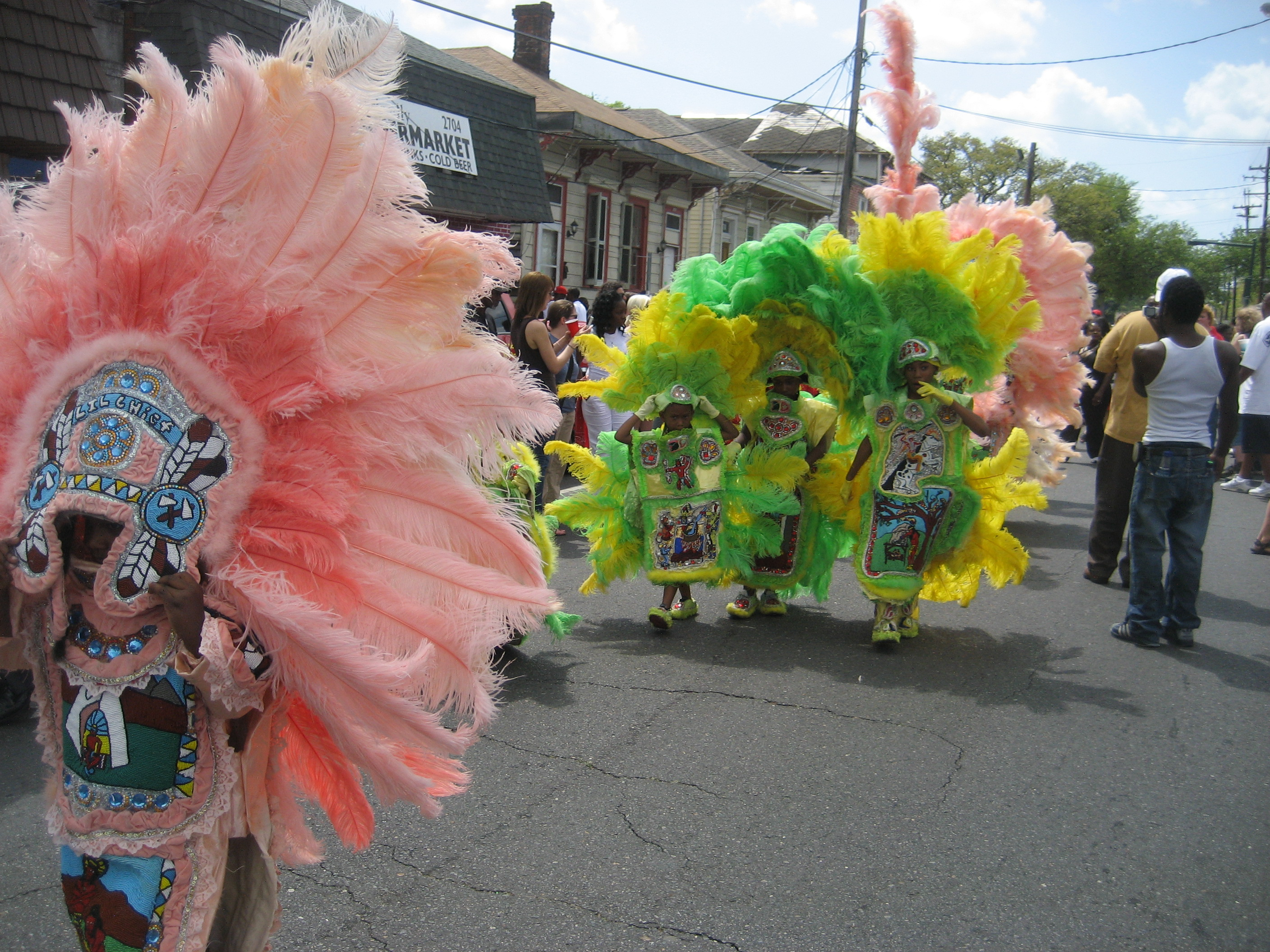
Mardi Gras Indians, second lines, and Carnival parades are part of Uptown's traditions.

Uptown was built along the higher ground along an old natural river levee on a wide, gradual bend of the Mississippi. Streets were laid out either roughly following the River's curve or perpendicular to it, resulting in what has been called a "wheel with spokes" street pattern (with the hub inland from Uptown, in the Broadmoor and Mid-City areas).

Major roadways echoing the river's crescent include Tchoupitoulas Street closest to the river. Formerly heavily devoted to river shipping commerce, as shipping became more containerized in the later 20th century more of Tchoupitoulas was devoted to residential and other commercial uses. The next major street back is Magazine. While Magazine Street has only one lane of traffic in both directions, it is a major commercial district, known for its many locally owned shops, restaurants, and art galleries. Prytania Street is the next major street inland, home to the Prytania Theatre, although it extends only up to Jefferson Avenue as a major thoroughfare.

Next is well-known St. Charles Avenue, home to the St. Charles Avenue streetcar line. St. Charles was the city's "millionaires row" in the 19th century, and a good number of the architecturally significant old mansions remain. But much of the avenue holds newer apartment buildings and commercial establishments, and some mansions have been converted to rental units. Farther back, the streets Simon Bolivar, LaSalle, and Freret form another parallel with the river. Farthest back is wide Claiborne Avenue, which until the early 20th century had a canal running down its neutral ground and was the back boundary of development until the drainage pumps designed by A. Baldwin Wood were installed (see: Drainage in New Orleans).

Major "spokes" perpendicular to the river include Melpomene/Martin Luther King Jr. Boulevard; Jackson, Washington, Louisiana, Napoleon, Jefferson, and Nashville Avenues; and Broadway, Carrollton Avenue, and Leonidas Street. Many of these were formerly the main streets of, or boundary lines between, the various early 19th-century towns which were absorbed into the city.

Near the upper end of Uptown, on and around the land used for the 1884 World Cotton Centennial, are Uptown landmarks Audubon Park, Tulane University, and Loyola University.

=== Education ===
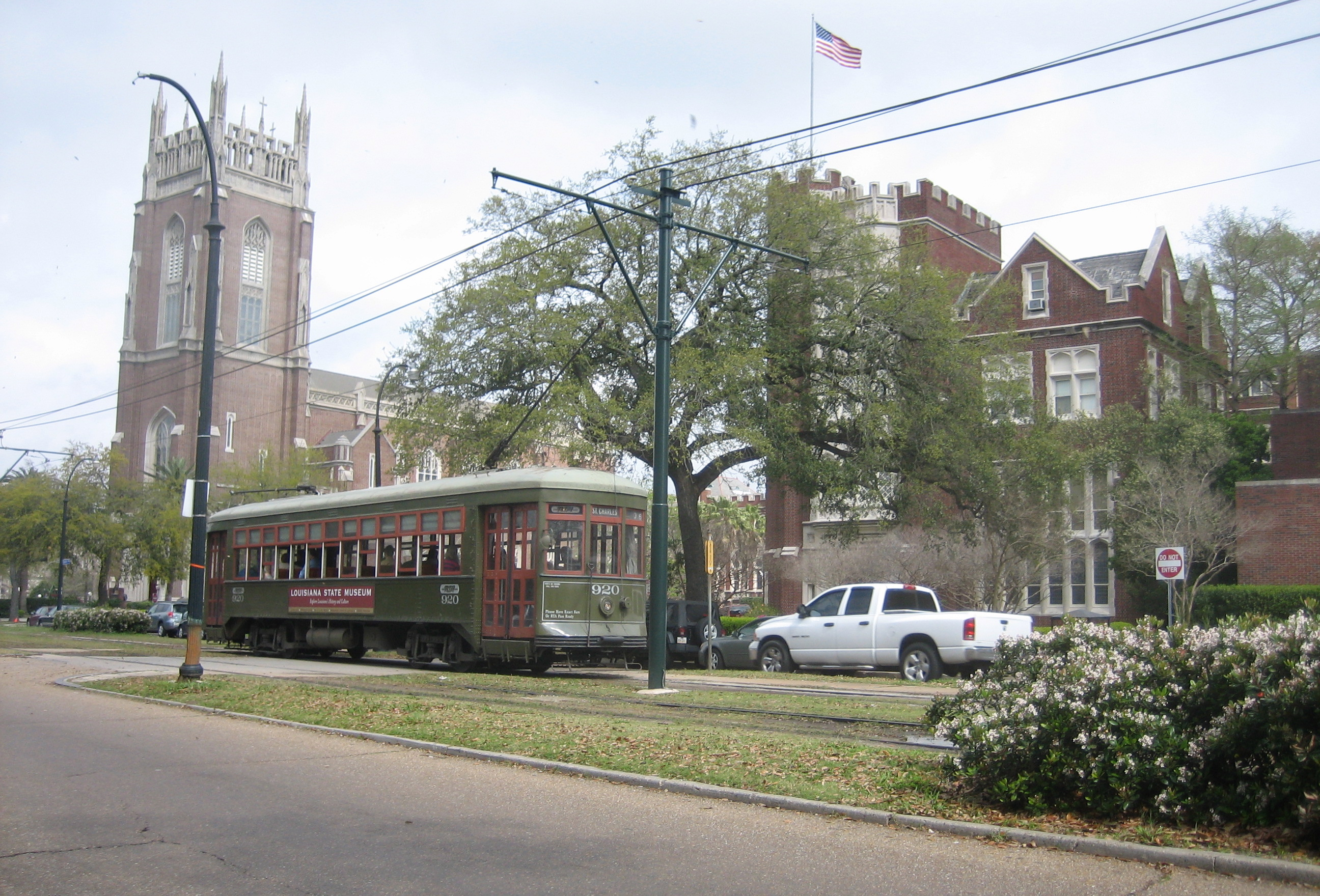
A view of Loyola University New Orleans, adjacent to Tulane University from St. Charles Avenue

New Orleans Public Schools operates district public schools, while Recovery School District oversees charter schools.

Open-admission Uptown-area high schools include Walter L. Cohen High School, Eleanor McMain Secondary School, New Orleans Charter Science and Mathematics High School (Sci High), New Orleans College Prep, and Sophie B. Wright Institute of Academic Excellence. As of 2012 Cohen is being phased out, being replaced by College Prep. Sci High is located in the former Allen Elementary School campus. Lusher Charter School, a closed-admissions charter school, is in Uptown, in the former Alcee Fortier High School building. The Lycée Français de la Nouvelle Orléans, a public French immersion charter school, is also in Uptown.

Sojourner Truth Academy, a charter school located in Uptown, was established in 2008 and disestablished in 2012.

Catholic schools include:

- St. Katharine Drexel Preparatory School (formerly used by Xavier University Prep)

== Neighborhoods in Uptown ==
Important neighborhoods of Uptown include, going roughly upriver from Canal Street:

- Central City
- Garden District
- Irish Channel
- Faubourg Bouligny
- Audubon/University District
- Carrollton
- Central Business District

Some definitions of Uptown also include areas back from Claiborne such as the Broadmoor and Fontainebleau neighborhoods.

== People ==
Notable Uptowners have included:

- Jazz musicians Louis Armstrong, Buddy Bolden, George Brunies, Harry Connick Jr., Percy Humphrey, the Neville Brothers, Joe "King" Oliver, Leon Roppolo, Gregg Stafford, singers the Boswell Sisters and Mahalia Jackson
- Inventor A. Baldwin Wood
- Writers Michael Lewis, Anne Rice, and John Kennedy Toole
- Ethnobotanist Mark Plotkin
- Past and present professional football players Archie Manning and his sons Peyton and Eli Manning, Steve Gleason, Drew Brees and Thomas Morstead
- New Orleans Saints former head coach Sean Payton and owner Tom Benson
- Rappers B.G., Birdman (rapper), Soulja Slim, Juvenile, and Lil Wayne

== See also ==
- History of New Orleans
- List of streets of New Orleans
- National Register of Historic Places listings in Orleans Parish, Louisiana
- Neighborhoods in New Orleans
- New Orleans Mardi Gras
- New Orleans Public Library
- St. Charles Avenue
- St. Charles Streetcar Line
- Wards of New Orleans
- Historic Cemeteries of New Orleans
- Basilica of St. Stephen
