= Prytania Theatre =

Movie theater in New Orleans, Louisiana

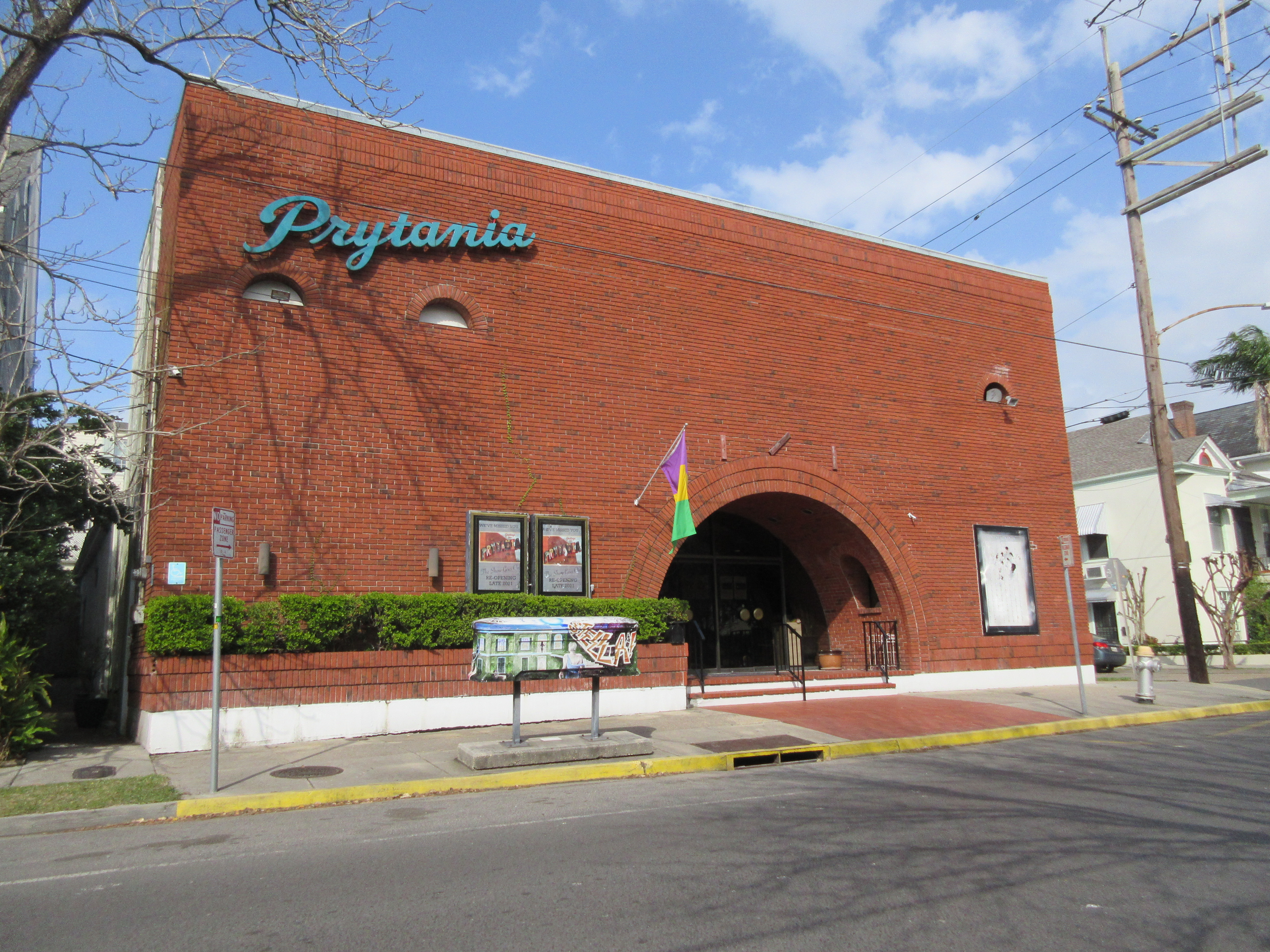
- Exterior of venue in 2022
- Interactive map of Prytania Theatre
- Address: 5339 Prytania St; New Orleans, Louisiana 70115
- Location: Uptown New Orleans
- Coordinates: 29.925183°N 90.11317188°W
- Owner: Brunet Family
- Capacity: 272
- Screen: 1

Construction
- Built: 1914
- Opened: 15 January 1915
- Closed: 1926 (Old location)
- Rebuilt: 1927 (Current Location)
- Years active: 1915–1926, 1927–present
- Cost: $100,000 ($1.85 million in 2025 dollars)

Website
- www.theprytania.com

Prytania Theatre is a single screen movie theatre in uptown New Orleans, Louisiana. It is the oldest operating movie theater in New Orleans and the last operating single screen movie theater in the state of Louisiana.

== History ==
=== Original Location ===
The Prytania Theatre originally opened in 1915 as an outdoor theatre. After its opening, a roof was added. A fire burnt the building to the ground in 1926.

=== Current Location ===
The theatre moved to its current location on Prytania Street. The current structure was built in 1926 and was operated by M. H. Jacobs Theatrical Enterprises. The theatre proved very popular even but eventually encountered financial difficulties to the rise of suburban multiplexes in the 1970s. This caused the theatre to switch from showing current films to showing classics. Eventually, the building was sold to Chris Riley who renovated the space. Following Riley's death, it was sold to John & Gail Gish who leased it to the Brunet Family. The Brunet family has a 50-year lease on the property.
