= Alden Roche =

American football player (1945–2022)

No. 77, 87, 75
- Position: Defensive end

Personal information
- Born: April 9, 1945; New Orleans, Louisiana, U.S.
- Died: May 29, 2022 (aged 77); Marrero, Louisiana, U.S.
- Listed height: 6 ft 4 in (1.93 m)
- Listed weight: 255 lb (116 kg)

Career information
- High school: Xavier (LA)
- College: Southern (1969)
- NFL draft: 1970: 2nd round, 37th overall pick

Career history
- Denver Broncos (1970); Green Bay Packers (1971–1976); Baltimore Colts (1977)*; Seattle Seahawks (1977–1978)
- * Offseason or practice squad member only

Career NFL statistics
- Sacks: 36.0
- Fumble recoveries: 9
- Stats at Pro Football Reference

Alden Stephen Rochè Jr. (/roʊˈʃeɪ/ roh-SHAY; April 9, 1945 – May 29, 2022) was an American professional football player who was a defensive end for nine seasons in the National Football League (NFL). He played for the Denver Broncos, Green Bay Packers, and Seattle Seahawks from 1970 to 1978, having earlier played college football at Southern University.

== Early life ==
Roche was born in New Orleans on April 9, 1945. He attended Xavier University Preparatory School in his hometown. He then studied at Southern University, where he played college football for the Southern Jaguars. He received first-team All-American honors and was selected as an All-SWAC defensive end. He was also named the university's most valuable defensive lineman in 1969. Roche was drafted by the Denver Broncos in the second round (37th overall selection) of the 1970 NFL draft.

== Career ==
Roche made his NFL debut with the Broncos on September 20, 1970, at the age of 25, in a 25–10 win over the Buffalo Bills. He played in all 14 games during his rookie season, before being traded to the Green Bay Packers for Don Horn on January 28 the following year. The transaction also included a swap of 1971 first-round picks, with the Packers selecting John Brockington at 9th and the Broncos choosing Marv Montgomery at 12th.

The Packers appointed Dan Devine as head coach six games into the 1971 season. He chose Roche as the starting right defensive end, replacing the incumbent Lionel Aldridge, a holdover from the Packers' glory days under Vince Lombardi. Roche was noted for his versatility – filling in for Mike McCoy at left defensive tackle and Clarence Williams at left defensive end – and won the Packers most valuable player award for defense that year. He went on to hold the starting role for the next five seasons, playing in all but one game during his tenure with the franchise. He played an integral role in helping the Packers finish second in the league in team defense during the 1972 season, when the team won what was ultimately their only division title between 1967 and 1995. He also tied with McCoy for the franchise lead in sacks (8.5) in 1976. Roche formed a noted defensive partnership with Williams.

Roche joined the Seattle Seahawks in 1977. He spent his last two years in the NFL with the franchise before retiring after the 1978 season.

== Personal life ==
Roche was inducted into the Greater New Orleans Sports Hall of Fame in 1991. His grandson, Jay'Shawn Washington, played college football for the Southern Miss Golden Eagles from 2015 to 2018.

Roche died on May 29, 2022, in Marrero, Louisiana, at the age of 77.
