= Basilica of St. Stephen (New Orleans) =

Roman Catholic Basilica in New Orleans

The Basilica of St. Stephen
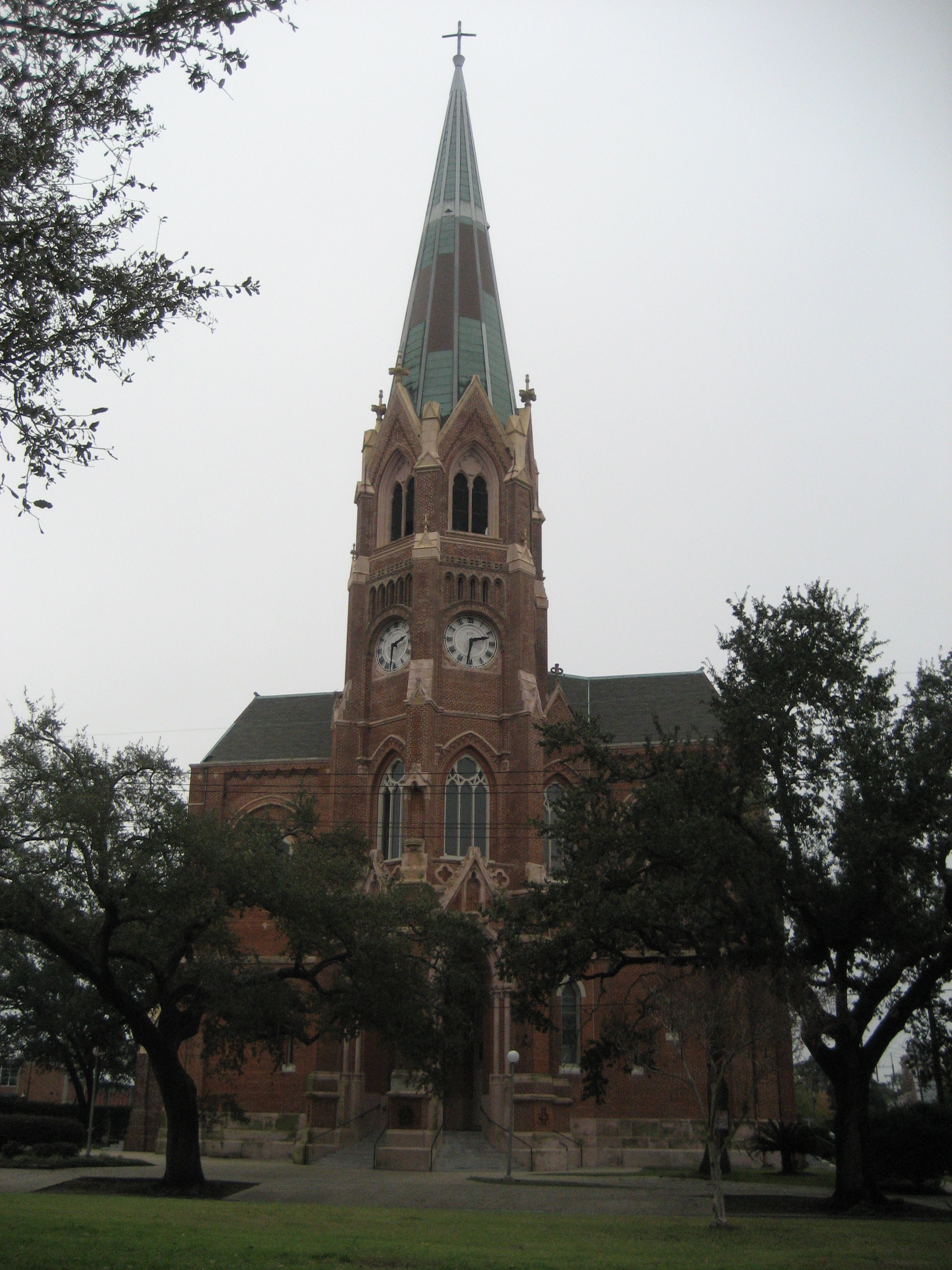
- St. Stephen Church as seen in 2007
- The Basilica of St. Stephen
- 29.9221°N 90.1010°W
- Location: 1025 Napoleon Avenue; New Orleans, Louisiana
- Country: United States
- Denomination: Roman Catholic
- Website: goodshepherdparishnola.com

History
- Status: Minor basilica
- Consecrated: January 1, 1888

Architecture
- Heritage designation: Historic landmark
- Architect: Thomas W. Carter
- Style: Gothic revival
- Years built: 1871 - 1887
- Completed: 1887

Specifications
- Capacity: 2000

Administration
- Archdiocese: New Orleans
- Parish: Good Shepherd

Clergy
- Archbishop: Gregory Aymond
- Pastor: Christopher H. Nalty

The Basilica of St. Stephen is a church in New Orleans, Louisiana, United States, that became a minor basilica in June 2022. It is also known as Saint Stephen Church. It is located in Uptown New Orleans. The Basilica of St. Stephen is part of Good Shepherd Parish and has a parochial school associated with it.

The church is listed as an historic landmark by the city of New Orleans.

== History ==
St. Stephen Church was founded in 1849 by priests from the Congregation of the Mission (Vincentians), the priests having acquired the land in 1848. Originally, it was a mission church in the municipality of Jefferson City, Louisiana, which was subsequently annexed by the city of New Orleans.

By the late 1850s, Father Anthony Verrina concluded that a large church was needed to serve the rapidly growing population of the locale at the time. Verrina was the third pastor of the parish, and he also led the fund-raising efforts. The parish hired Thomas W. Carter as architect for the new church and Thomas O'Neil as the builder. Construction commenced in November 1871.

The architectural design of St. Stephen Church is in a Gothic revival style, showing design influence from Minden Cathedral in Germany. It has a hallenkirche floor plan with light entering the church through windows and with naves and aisles of equal height. The church has a large rose window at the rear of the building. As of 1979, it was the second largest church in New Orleans, exceeded by St. Joseph Church. The stained glass windows, which are extensive in the church, were designed and manufactured by Franz Mayer of Munich.

Construction of the present St. Stephen Church commenced in 1871 and was completed in 1887. The first mass in the new church was held on December 26, 1887, the day being the Feast of St. Stephen. Its consecration was on January 1, 1888.

The spire of St. Stephen Church was added following construction of the church. The spire's design, by the architectural firm Favrot & Livaudais, is a steel frame that is wrapped in terracotta tiles. It is 200 feet in height and has 24 sides. The spire has windows with stained glass. Construction of the spire was carried out in 1905 and 1906. The pipe organ dates from 1939, making it one of the oldest in the city.

As a result of economic and demographic effects of Hurricane Katrina, in October 2008, the congregation of St. Stephen Church merged with the congregations of St. Henry’s Catholic Church and Our Lady of Good Counsel Church to form Good Shepherd Parish.

In November 2025, the Archdiocese of New Orleans placed over 150 parishes and charities in Chapter 11 bankruptcy protection as part of a settlement plan to resolve hundreds of sex abuse lawsuits. This wave of bankruptcies included this church.

=== School ===
In 1852, the parish of St. Stephen Church opened a school to serve the children of its parishioners. Over the years of the school's existence it has offered education from kindergarten through secondary school, although the secondary school closed in 1966. As of 2022, St. Stephen School educates students up until the seventh grade.

Early in its history, the school was known as St. Vincent Academy. The faculty was staffed over the years by the Daughters of Charity, the Christian Brothers of Mary, and lay teachers.

The secondary school at St. Stephen Church was damaged in Hurricane Betsy, which was a contributing factor in its closure. The school of St. Stephen Church experienced significant damage during Hurricane Ida in August 2021.

=== Restoration ===
St. Stephen Church went through a major restoration in 2017 - 2018 at a cost of approximately USD 6.9 million. The restoration corrected water leakage problems, improved illumination, and wear over time. Original flooring was restored. No architectural elements or historical features were altered.

== Basilica ==
Drawing of an umbraculum typically used in minor basilicas.

The papal decree naming St. Stephen Church as a basilica was signed on May 12, 2022, after a lengthy nomination process, led by the pastor, the Very Reverend Monsignor Christopher H. Nalty, requiring approximately 19 months to complete. Nalty noted that the parochial school associated with the basilica was likely an important factor in gaining status as a basilica. A goal of pursuing status as a basilica was to strengthen evangelization efforts within the church membership.

The Basilica of St. Stephen became the second basilica in the Archdiocese of New Orleans, the other one being St. Louis Cathedral. A third basilica in the state of Louisiana is the Basilica of the Immaculate Conception in Natchitoches, Louisiana.

Monsignor Nalty has publicly described his desire that the St. Stephen Basilica be open to worshipers at all times and that the basilica be part of a trail of significant Roman Catholic religious sites in the New Orleans Metropolitan Area.

Church symbols that are important to basilicas include the Umbraculum, the tintinnabulum (bells) and the symbol of tiara and keys that is on the Vatican flag. As of the time of elevation to basilica status, Nalty commissioned artists to design and produce the symbols to be used by the Basilica of St. Stephen.

Through its existence, St. Stephen Church was always multiethnic and was never associated with any particular ethnic group. This characteristic was unusual for churches in the United States in the nineteenth century and the early part of the twentieth century. Due to its physical size, the church always had a prominence in Uptown New Orleans. Its architectural features and its history have been other characteristics important in achieving status as a basilica.
