= Xavier University of Louisiana =

Private university in New Orleans, Louisiana, US

- Motto: Deo Adjuvante Non Timendum
- Motto in English: With God's help there is nothing to fear
- Type: Private historically black university
- Established: 1925; 101 years ago
- Founder: St. Katharine Drexel
- Religious affiliation: Catholic (Sisters of the Blessed Sacrament)
- Academic affiliations: ACCU, UNCF, Space-grant
- Endowment: $178 million (2022)
- Chairman: Sonia Perez
- President: C. Reynold Verret
- Provost: Marguerite Giguette
- Students: 3,218 (fall 2024)
- Undergraduates: 2,688 (fall 2024)
- Postgraduates: 530 (fall 2024)
- Location: New Orleans, Louisiana, U.S., U.S. 29°57′55″N 90°06′25″W
- Campus: Urban
- Colors: Gold and white
- Nickname: Gold Rush and Gold Nuggets
- Sporting affiliations: NAIA – RRAC
- Website: xula.edu
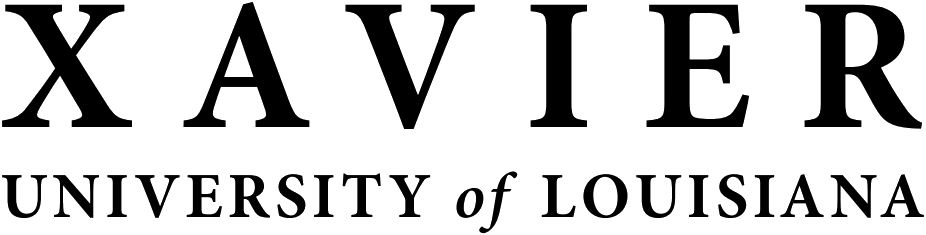

Xavier University of Louisiana (XULA) is a private historically black Catholic university in New Orleans, Louisiana, United States. It is the only Catholic HBCU. Upon the canonization of Katharine Drexel in 2000 it became the first Catholic university founded by a saint.

== History ==
=== Background ===
Katharine Drexel, a Catholic nun possessing a substantial inheritance from her father, banker-financier Francis Drexel, founded and staffed many institutions throughout the United States in the 19th and 20th centuries, in an effort to help educate and evangelize Native Americans and African Americans. Many of her chosen staff included sisters of the Sisters of the Blessed Sacrament, the religious order she founded and served in as the first Superior General.

Aware of the lack of Catholic education for young black people in the South during Jim Crow, she planned to establish a high school in New Orleans. The chosen site had been previously occupied by Southern University on Magazine Street, a black institution which had moved to Baton Rouge in 1912 after an influx of white neighbors petitioned for its relocation.

Drexel sent the Josephite priest Pierre Oscar LeBeau to survey the property, to avoid public scrutiny and controversy, as her reputation for establishing black schools was well known. On April 13, 1915, Harry McEnerny, serving as Drexel's agent, purchased the property for $18,000 (1915) (equivalent to $413,839.57 in 2025). She knew that the city and community would never approve a sale for a black institution, but by going through an agent, the sale was allowed; even so, vandals smashed all the windows after learning of Drexel's intent.

=== High school era ===
The high school opened on 27 September 1915 as Southern University of New Orleans, later re-named after Francis Xavier (the namesake of Katharine's father). In May 1916, it was incorporated under the title, "Sisters of the Blessed Sacrament for Indians and Colored People, of Louisiana," according to the laws of the state, and the new name, "Xavier University", was cut into the stone slab above the main entrance. (The high school, Xavier Prep, remained in operation until 2013; today, St. Katharine Drexel Preparatory School operates from the same location.) The original campus consisted of the main Administration Building and a Convent for the Sisters.

In order to secure the standard of excellent required by the faculty for graduation, students were not enrolled beyond the eleventh grade, therefore, the first Xavier High School graduates, twenty-five in number, received their diplomas in June 1917. In September 1917, Xavier expanded to include a normal school to provide training for black teachers, as Archbishop James H. Blenk was eager for graduates to teach at six planned new black parishes. As described in a 1917 Xavier Bulletin, "Xavier University, located on the site of "Old Southern University," 5100-16 Magazine Street, is a school for higher education of Colored youths and girls. The curriculum comprises a four years' high school course supplemented by a post-graduate course of two years. The latter includes a junior normal period of two semesters, and a senior normal of two semesters. A thorough course in theory and art of teaching, embracing pedagogical subjects, intellectual, physical and manual, is pursued. The graduate student of the normal course is entitled to a diploma from Xavier University, which is recognized by the Board of Education of the State of Louisiana, and upon which the said Board issues a certificate of eligibility to teach in the City of New Orleans." On September 9, 1921, the Louisiana Department of Education officially recognized "Xavier University" as a State Approved High School. By 1922, the school was described as the only Catholic institution in the United States that offered "a full four years' high school course to colored boys." While this may not be true, Xavier University was by far the most prominent Catholic institution offering such educational opportunities at the time.

=== University founding ===
In September 1925, Xavier University of Louisiana came into being when the College of Liberal Arts and Sciences was established, with the Josephite priest Edward Brunner as the first president. This expansion included a Teachers' College and a Pre-Medical Course added to the curriculum for the, "higher education of young men and women of the colored race who aim to equip themselves for leadership in literary and scientific careers, or who wish to prepare for admission into recognized medical schools. The Louisiana Department of Education officially recognized Xavier University as a four-year college on March 19, 1928, with the first degrees awarded that spring. Alongside Drexel's sisters, the Josephites served as some of the school's first male teachers, and as chaplains.

The College of Pharmacy was next to be opened, officially beginning 19 September 1927. As stated in the 1927-28 Xavier College Bulletin, "The Purpose of this department is to afford young men and women desirous of entering upon the pharmaceutical profession an opportunity of securing the special training necessary for the successful practice of that profession. In Louisiana, as in all other states, the law requires the pharmacist to be registered, and in order to become registered, he must pass an examination given by the State Board of Pharmaceutical Examiners. The former method of preparation for this examination by apprenticeship in a drug store is no longer considered adequate, and the law now requires the applicant to be a graduate of a College of Pharmacy. The Department of Pharmacy of Xavier will engage the prospective pharmacist to fulfill this requirement and to fit himself, under competent instructors, to become efficient in his chosen profession."

Recognizing the university's need for a separate identity and room to expand, Drexel bought a tract of undeveloped land for a campus on the corner of Palmetto and Pine Streets in 1929. To avoid blockage of the deal, Drexel again purchased the property through an agent.

Construction of the U-shaped, Gothic Revival-style Main Building, Convent and Library, made from Indiana limestone and now on the National Register of Historic Places, were completed between 1932 and 1937. The Main Administration Building was dedicated by the Archbishop of Philadelphia, Cardinal Dennis Joseph Dougherty, on Columbus Day, October 12, 1932. The Administration building is a City of New Orleans landmark.

=== Modern history ===
In May 1961, a group of Freedom Riders, arrived in New Orleans by plane after bus drivers in Alabama refused to take them to Montgomery, Alabama. Locals, aware of the fire bombings and other attacks against other Freedom Riders, refused to accommodate them with lodging out of fear of retaliatory violence. Norman C. Francis, the university's Dean of Men, secretly arranged for the group to stay several days in a dormitory on campus. He had received permission from University President Sister Mary Josephina to allow the group to occupy space on the third floor of St. Michael's Hall under the condition that the press would not be alerted as to the move.

In 1987, Pope John Paul II addressed the presidents of all U.S. Catholic colleges from the courtyard of the Xavier administration building.

When Hurricane Katrina struck the New Orleans area in August 2005, Xavier, located in the lower-lying Gert Town section and adjacent to the Washington-Palmetto Canal, suffered damage to almost every structure on campus. Many buildings sat partially submerged for extended periods of time following the hurricane. University president Francis organized boats and buses to transport stranded faculty, staff, and students from the campus to safe areas. Students began returning to the university in January 2006.

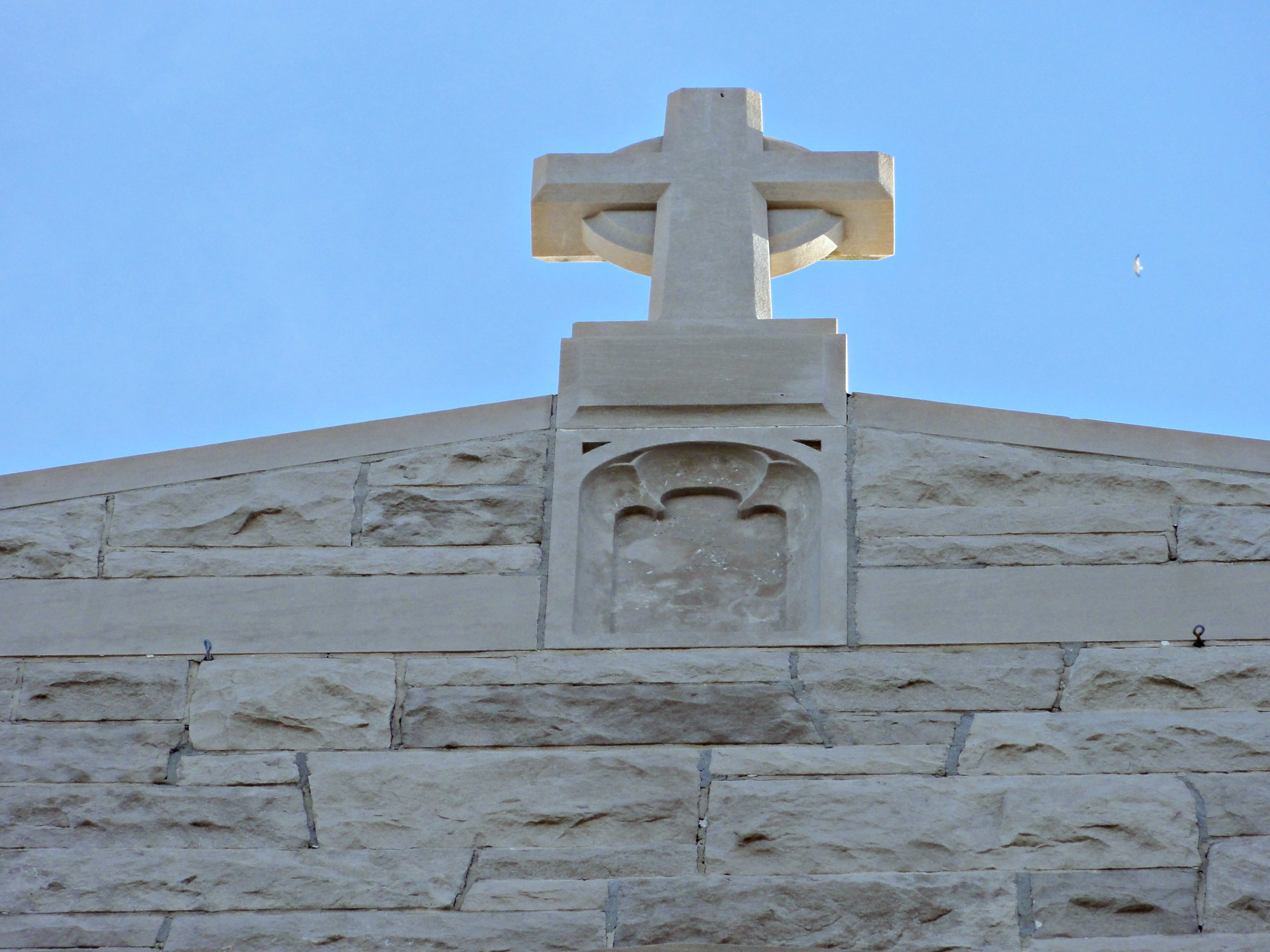
Limestone facade

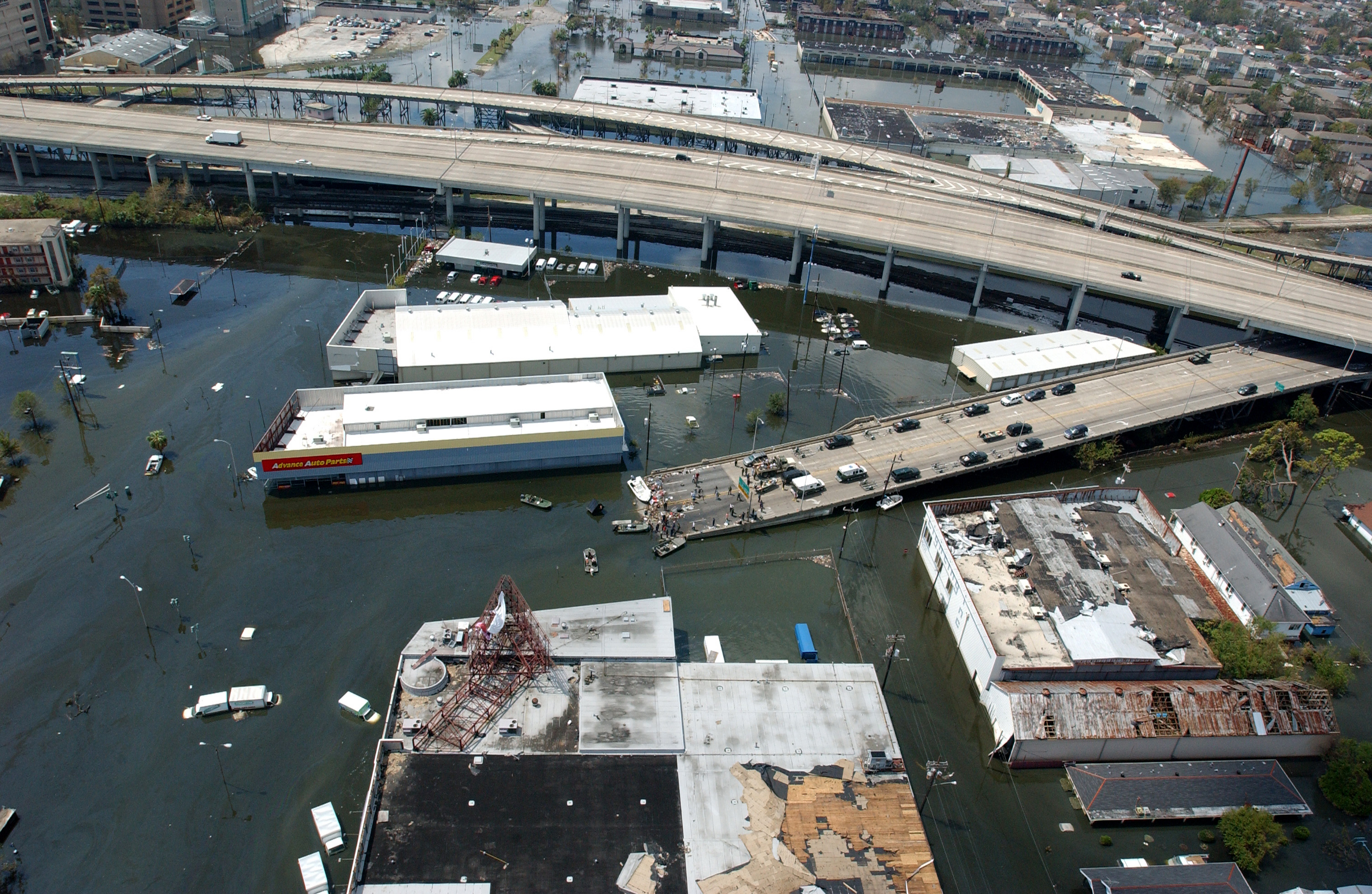
Katrina, 2005

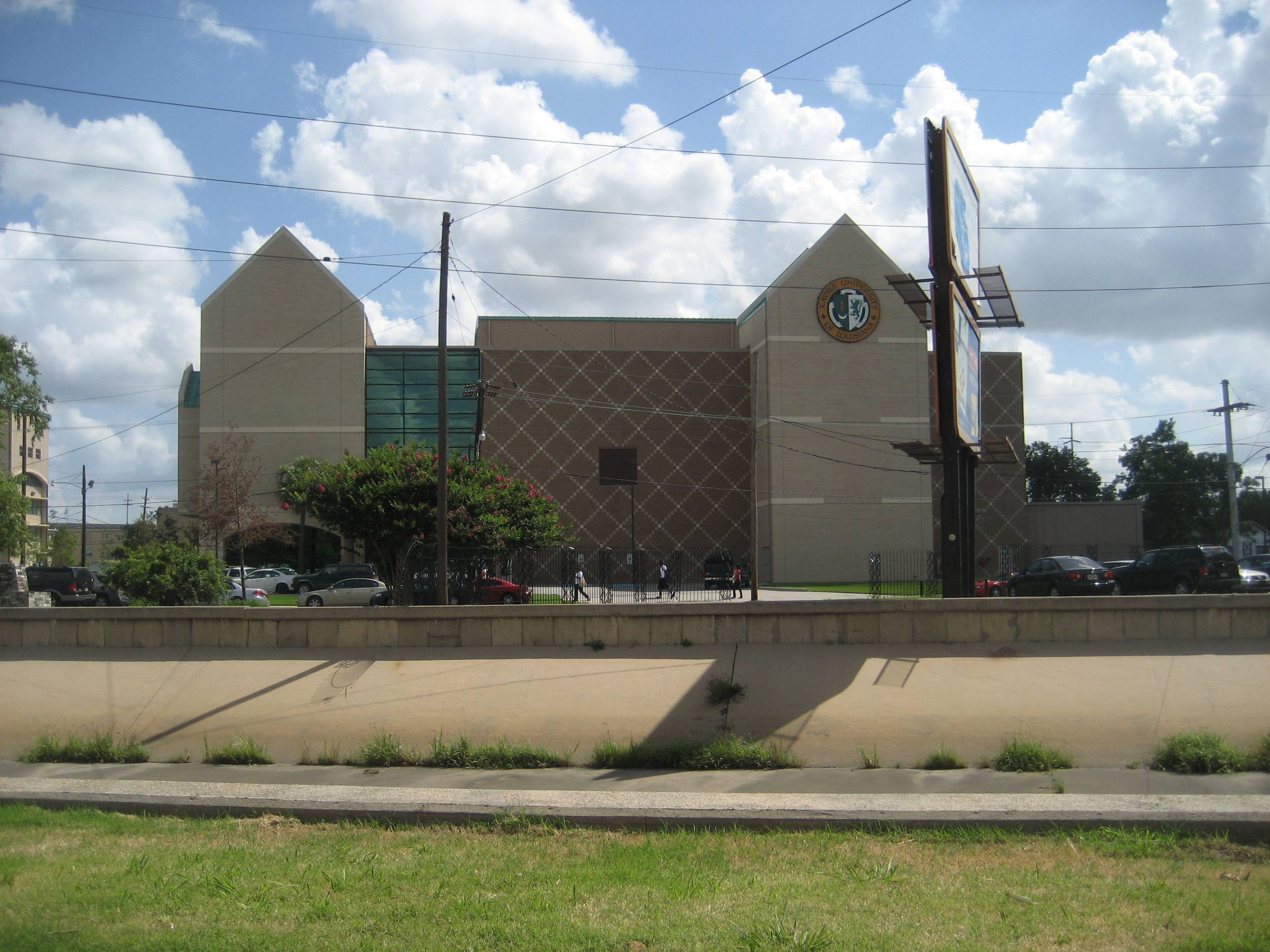
Xavier, across canal

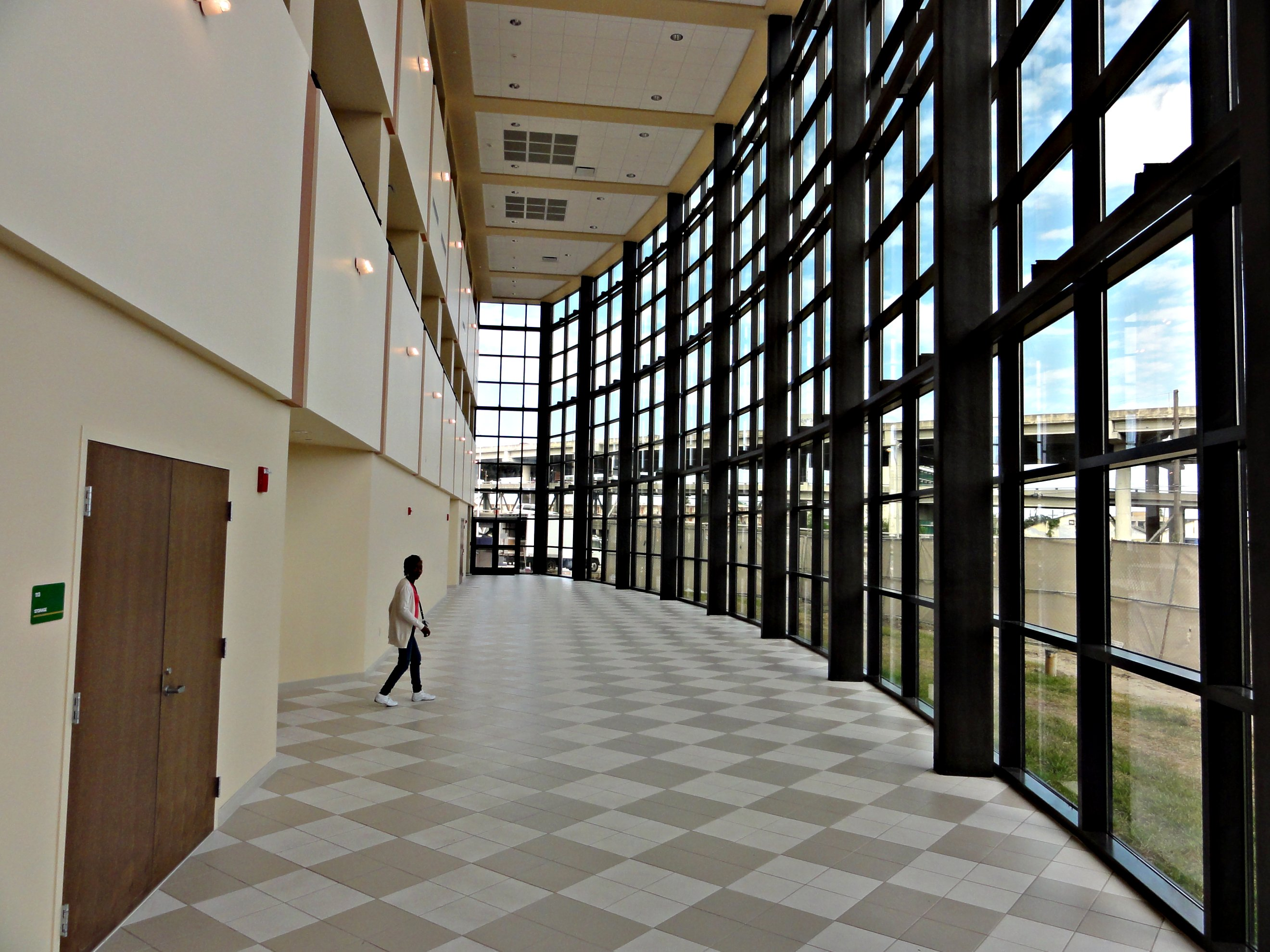
Qatar Pharmacy Pavilion

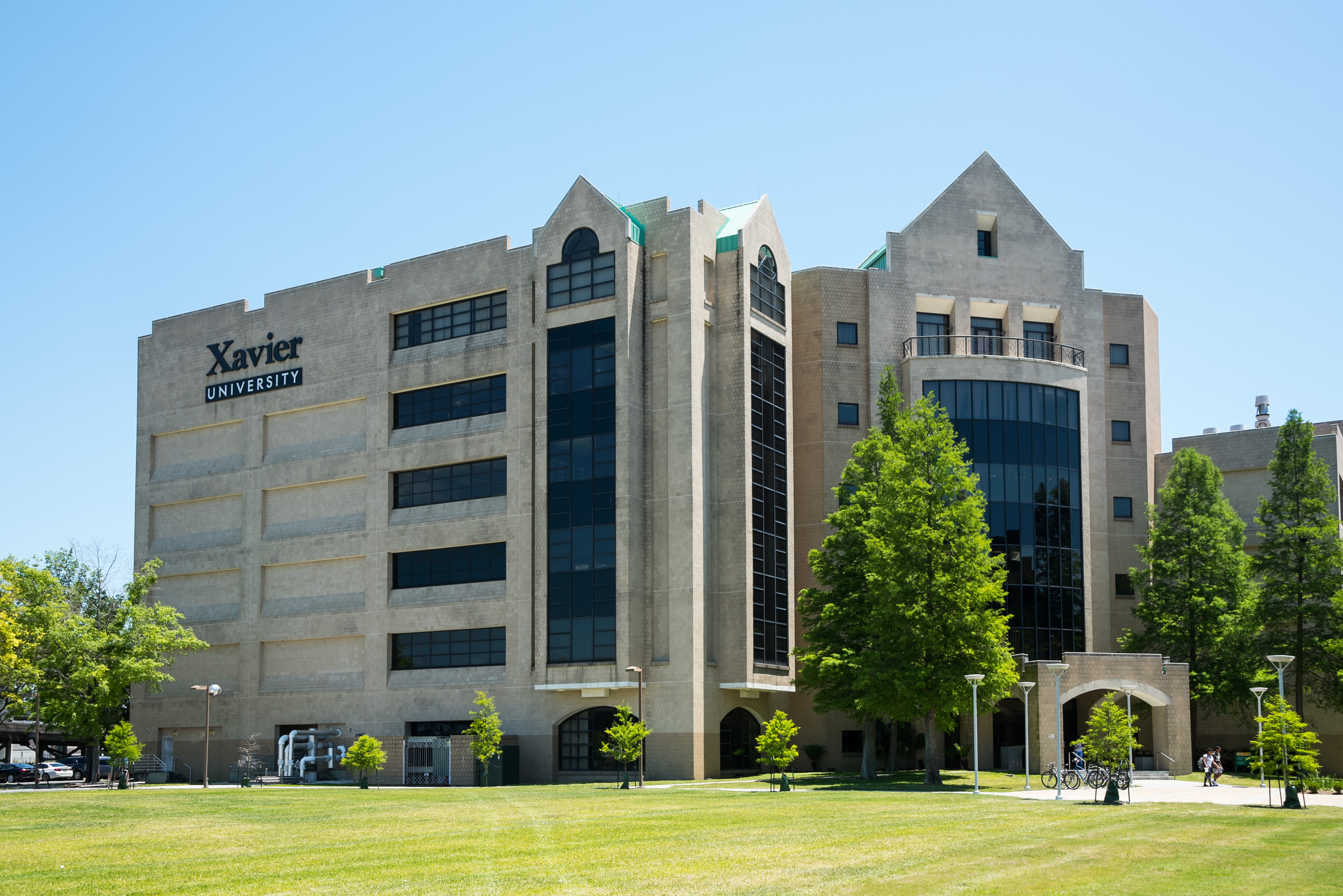
XULA Library

In April 2006, the nation of Qatar donated $17.5 million to assist the university in hurricane recovery and in expanding the school's College of Pharmacy. The groundbreaking in 2008 was attended by Sheikh Hamad bin Khalifa al-Thani, leader of Qatar, and on 15 October 2010 the school's Qatar Pharmacy Pavilion opened, adding 60,000 square feet (5,600 m^{2}) adjacent to the existing College of Pharmacy building.

Senator Barack Obama gave the commencement speech in August 2006. New Orleans' archbishop, Alfred C. Hughes, declined to attend, citing that Obama was not opposed to abortion, and that he had not been consulted prior to the event. Obama returned after becoming president, visiting New Orleans in August 2010 to commemorate the fifth anniversary of Hurricane Katrina. He gave an address at Xavier complimenting the work of the leaders of the community and affirming the commitment to continue to aid in the rebuilding of the area.

The university received the "Katrina Compassion Award" from the United States government Corporation for National and Community Service in 2006, for the efforts of an estimated 60% of its students in rebuilding the neighborhoods damaged by the hurricane.

Xavier's campus was evacuated during Hurricane Ida in August 2021, 16 years to the day after Hurricane Katrina. Students who remained on campus were later evacuated to Dallas. The school resumed operations as normal on September 13.

In May 2024, Xavier announced that they would be launching a new medical school in partnership with the Ochsner Health System. The school was named the Xavier Ochsner College of Medicine (XOCOM). The seed funding was provided by Bloomberg Philanthropies in August 2024 with a gift of $5 million. Dr. Leonardo Seoane was selected to serve as founding dean. It will be the fifth historically black medical school in the United States as well as the only HBCU medical school in the Gulf Coast. The medical school is located in Benson Tower. XOCOM has not yet begun accepting students because it has not been accredited by the Liaison Committee on Medical Education (LCME). The school does not have a projection on when it will enroll its first students, but preliminary accreditation typically takes two to four years. Upon review from the preliminary accreditation process, the Xavier Ochsner College of Medicine will recruit students.

=== Philanthropy ===
In July 2020, Xavier received $20 million from philanthropist MacKenzie Scott, the second largest single gift in the university's history. In November 2025, Scott donated an additional $38 million which is the largest single gift in the university's history.

In January 2026, Xavier University’s Ochsner College of Medicine announced that Humana donated $3 million to establish a scholarship fund, called The Humana Health Workforce Scholarship Fund, for medical students at Xavier interested in pursuing primary care, internal medicine or maternal care in Louisiana. The scholarship fund was started in order to reduce the financial barrier to attending medical school and to encourage graduates to stay in Louisiana. Students who demonstrate a financial need will qualify and have to apply for the scholarship after being admitted to the medical school. Further, the college is working on developing a subcommittee with participation from Humana to select one scholarship recipient per year.

== Demographics ==
=== Students ===
Though Xavier is the nation's only historically Black and Catholic university, its doors have always been open to qualified students of any race or creed.

In fall 2020, the vast majority of the student body was Black or African American (approx. 75.1%), and 12% identified as Catholic. Xavier was also the first U.S. Catholic college to educate both men and women, though the university currently enrolls a student population that is overwhelmingly made up of women (at more than 75%). Almost half of Xavier's students (43.8%) in the fall of 2020 were from Louisiana. Non-local enrollment continues to increase, with students coming in from at least 40 other states and sixteen foreign countries.

=== Faculty ===
As of fall 2020, Xavier had a full-time faculty of 236 educators, both religious and lay, of diverse ethnic and racial origins—95 percent of whom have terminal degrees—providing a student/faculty ratio of 12.5/1.

Forty-four faculty members serve as endowed chairs or professors, which provides additional financial support for their research and teaching.

Unique among HBCUs, Xavier has a higher percentage of non-Black faculty than Black as of 2022.

== Administration ==
=== Presidents ===
Norman C. Francis

President Verret

- Edward J. Brunner (1915–1932)
- Mother M. Agatha Ryan (1932–1955)
- Josephina Kenney (1955–1965)
- M. Maris Stella Ross (1965–1968)
- Norman C. Francis (1968–2015)
- C. Reynold Verret (2015–present)

== Academics ==
=== College of Arts and Sciences ===
==== Academic divisions ====
- Biological and Public Health Sciences
- Business
- Education and Counseling
- Fine Arts and Humanities
- Mathematical and Physical Sciences
- Philosophy
- Social and Behavioral Sciences
- Theology

=== College of Pharmacy ===
==== Academic divisions ====
- Division of Basic Pharmaceutical Sciences
- Division of Clinical and Administrative Sciences

=== Pre-Med and biological science programs ===
Academic rankings

Master's
- Washington Monthly: 114

Regional
- U.S. News & World Report: 17 (South)

More African-American alumni of Xavier consistently place into medical school and graduate with baccalaureate degrees in the physical sciences and biological sciences than African-American alumni of any other college or university in the United States. Xavier's College of Pharmacy is one of just two pharmacy schools in Louisiana. Xavier consistently ranks among the top three colleges in the nation in graduating African Americans with Pharm.D. degrees.

=== Dual degree engineering program ===
Xavier does not offer engineering degrees but belongs to partnerships with several engineering institutions that automatically admit qualified Xavier science students interested in pursuing a bachelor's in an engineering discipline. Students who successfully complete the program will receive a bachelor's degree from Xavier and the chosen engineering institution in approximately five years. Engineering institutions in partnership with Xavier are Tulane University, University of New Orleans, Southern University at Baton Rouge, Louisiana State University, University of Notre Dame, North Carolina Agricultural and Technical State University, University of Detroit Mercy, Georgia Institute of Technology, and University of Wisconsin at Madison.

=== Institute for Black Catholic Studies ===
In 1979, the Institute for Black Catholic Studies was founded at XULA by Fr Thaddeus Posey, OFM Cap, with the help of Frs Augustus Taylor; David Benz; Joseph Nearon, SSS; and Sr Jamie Phelps, OP. Every summer since, IBCS has hosted a variety of accredited courses on Black Catholic theology, ministry, ethics, and history, offering a Continuing Education & Enrichment program as well as a Master of Theology degree—"the only graduate theology program in the western hemisphere taught from a black Catholic perspective". It is currently headed by Dr. Kathleen Dorsey Bellow.

=== Xavier Exponential ===
Established in 2018, Xavier Exponential is the university's holistically selective honors program for high-achieving undergraduate students. Students admitted to the program have access to special funding and learning opportunities.

== Special programs ==
=== Center for Equity, Justice, and the Human Spirit ===
In 2018, David Robinson-Morris founded the university's Center for Equity, Justice, and the Human Spirit (CEJHS), a social justice hub and a space for scholarly research and community-driven systems change.

The first of its kind at an HBCU, the center's focus is to shift oppressive policies and practices in education, criminal justice, and environmental sustainability. The Center aims to honor the faith and principles of XULA's foundress, St. Katharine, and benefits from a planning grant from the W. K. Kellogg Foundation.

Robinson-Morris departed the university in December 2020, saying that he was overworked, undervalued, and that his concerns about the university's administrative issues were not being fully heard and addressed. Cirecie Olatunji was appointed the new director in 2022.

== Campus life ==
=== S.B.S. Sisters ===
With the passing of Sr. Dr. Mary Ann Stachow, S.B.S. in February 2024, there are no longer any Sisters of the Blessed Sacrament remaining as teaching faculty on Xavier's campus. And, with Sr. Nathalee Bryant, S.B.S., departing St. Katharine Drexel Prep and returning to Philadelphia in August 2025, there are no longer any Sisters of the Blessed Sacrament remaining in New Orleans. For the first time in Xavier's history there are no S.B.S. represented in the daily operations of the university. Regardless, three members of the Sisters of the Blessed Sacrament still serve on Xavier's board of trustees.

=== Student organizations ===
- Student Government Association
- Homecoming Committee
- Student Advisory Board
- Student Life Council
- Pharmacy Student Association
- Residence Hall Association
- Commuter/Off-Campus Student Network
- Academic/departmental clubs
- Honor societies
- Professional Greek organizations
- NPHC Greek organizations
- Special interest organizations
- Intercollegiate athletics
- Performing groups

== Athletics ==
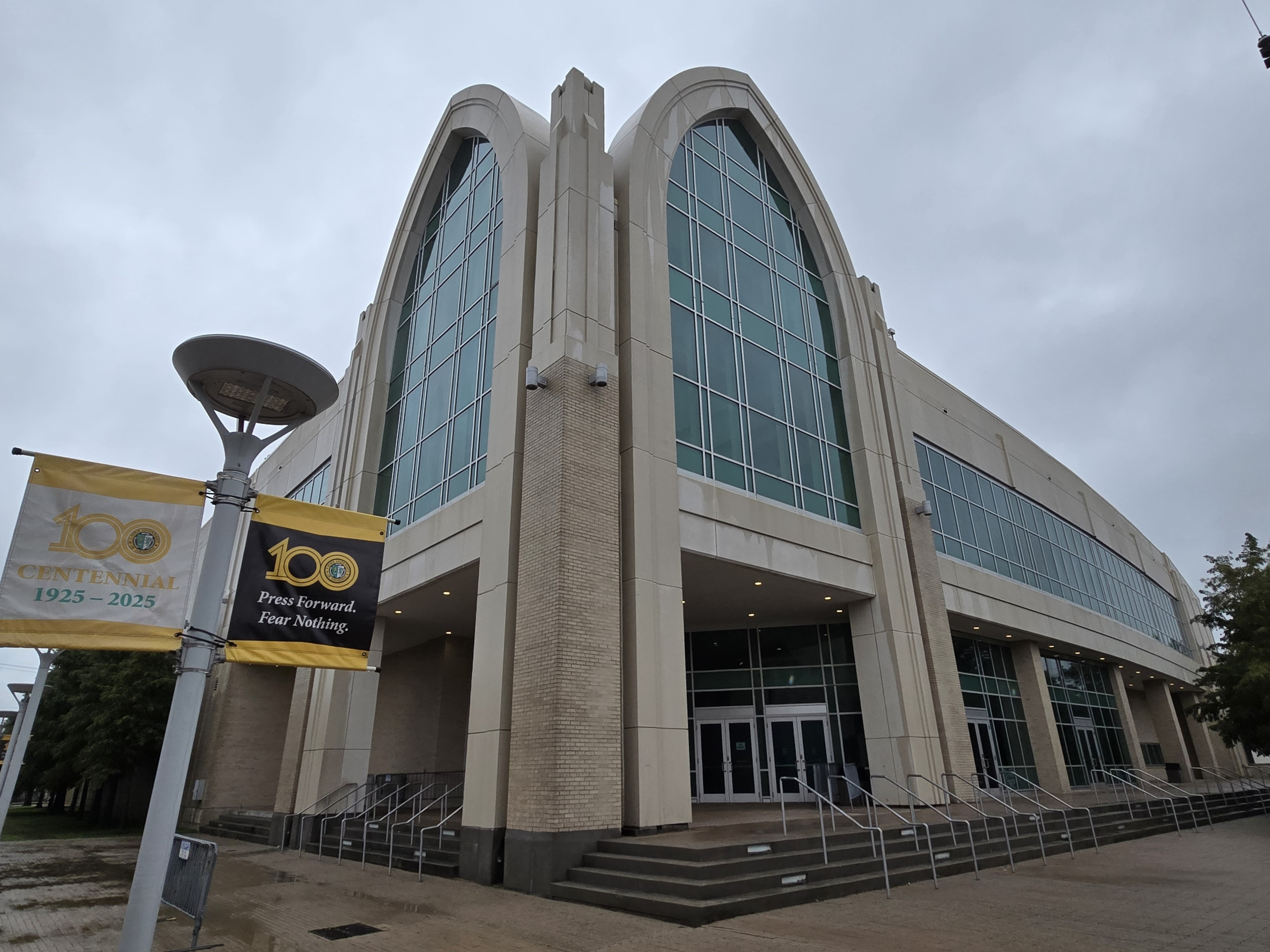
Convocation Center

The Xavier athletics teams are called the Gold Rush and Gold Nuggets. The university is a member of the National Association of Intercollegiate Athletics (NAIA), primarily competing in the Red River Athletic Conference (RRAC) since the 2021–22 academic year. The Gold Rush and Gold Nuggets previously competed in the Gulf Coast Athletic Conference (GCAC) from 1981–82 to 2020–21.

XULA competes in 12 intercollegiate varsity sports: Men's sports include baseball, basketball, cross country, tennis, track & field and rowing; women's sports include basketball, cross country, softball, tennis, track & field, volleyball, and rowing; and co-ed sports include competitive cheer. Former sports included football. The school has won two national championships in competitive cheer, in 2022 and 2026.

=== Facilities ===
Xavier's basketball and volleyball teams compete on campus in the Xavier University Academic Convocation Center. The Convocation Center is a $25 million facility with a seating capacity of 4,500.

== Media ==
=== Xavier Herald ===
The Xavier Herald, the university's student newspaper, has served as an outlet of the student voice, especially during the Civil Rights Movement and thereafter. Beginning in November of 1926, Xavier's first 'all-college publication' was Collumni. "With the development of the college department, the need was felt for an organ of expression, so several enterprising collegiates busied themselves and set about organizing a college paper." The Xavier Herald was first published in 1925, coinciding with the first year that Xavier University of Louisiana began offering college-level courses. The original title of the newspaper was La Cigale, which means grasshopper, or cicada, in French. In 1928, both the Collumni and La Cigale were merged into a single student newspaper, and renamed to The Xavier Herald, to identify the paper more with the university. The newspaper has been published continuously since, with issues scheduled monthly during the Fall and Spring semesters, but with less regular issues during the summer. It was instrumental in the fight for more Black faculty—the university remains one of the few HBCUs with more White faculty than Black—and for the hiring of Dr. Francis as the university's first lay president, as most of the previous presidents were from the Sisters of the Blessed Sacrament, who—despite serving minority communities—are largely White.

=== Other media ===
The university currently houses a student radio station, YouTube channel, and a podcast.

== Campus ==
=== Construction ===
Through the years, as needs dictated, the campus gradually expanded:

- Xavier Stadium (Land Purchased June 1929; Dedicated September 28, 1930; First Game Played October 4, 1930 vs Wiley University)
- Administration Building (Construction Began in 1931; Dedicated October 12, 1932; Opened Fall 1933)
- Old Library, now Music Department Building (Dedicated October 12, 1937)
- Gymnasium, referred to as "The Barn" (Dedicated November 2, 1937)
- Saint Thomas Aquinas Hall Men's Dormitory (1940s)
- Saint Michael's Hall Men's Dormitory (Blessed/Dedicated September 25, 1955; First Open House, October 12, 1955)
- Old Student Center (Opened and Dedicated December 2, 1962)
- Saint Joseph's Hall Women's Dormitory (1965)
- House of Studies (1967)
- Saint Katharine Drexel Hall Women's Dormitory (Dedicated April 20,1969)
- College of Pharmacy (Groundbreaking April 21, 1968; Dedicated April 5, 1970)
- Norman C. Francis Academic/Science Complex (1988)
- Xavier South Office Building (1990)
- Library Resource Center and College of Pharmacy Addition (1993)
- Peter Claver Women's Dormitory (1994)
- Norman C. Francis Science Complex Addition (1998)
- The Living Learning Center Upperclassmen Coed Residence (1998)
- University Student Center (2003)
- St. Martin de Porres Upperclassmen Residence (2003)
- Qatar Pharmacy Pavilion (2010)
- Convocation Academic Center (2012)
- Saint Katharine Drexel Chapel (2012)
- Fitness Center (2015)

The campus of Xavier University of Louisiana is often referred to as "Emerald City" due to the various buildings on campus that have green roofs. These include the Library/Resource center, the Norman C. Francis science addition, the University Center, the Living Learning Center, the Saint Martin De Porres hall and the Katharine Drexel hall.

== Notable alumni ==
In addition to former president, Norman C. Francis, distinguished alumni include:

Name	Class	Notability	References
Jimmie McDaniel	c. 1940	African-American tennis player who unofficially broke tennis' color barrier with an exhibition match against Don Budge.	
Herb Douglas	c. 1942	Olympic Bronze Medalist in the long jump (1948 Summer Olympics). Transferred from XULA in 1942	
Nathaniel Clifton	1946	First African-American to sign a contract with an NBA team and stick with a team; member of the Naismith Memorial Basketball Hall of Fame. Attended but did not graduate; left to join the Army during World War II.	
Mary Munson Runge	1948	First woman and first African American to be elected president of the American Pharmacists Association (APhA).	
Ernest Nathan Morial	1951	First African-American mayor of New Orleans	
John Stroger	1953	First African-American president of the Cook County, Illinois, Board of Commissioners.	
Bernard P. Randolph	1954	USAF General, retired: only the third African-American to reach the rank of four-star general in any branch of the U.S. Armed Forces, serving as head of the USAF Space and Defense Systems Command	
Joseph Boye Lomotey	1955	Ghanaian diplomat.	
William S. Fischer	1956	American jazz keyboardist, saxophonist, arranger, and composer.	
Marino Casem	1956	Head football coach at Alabama State University, Alcorn State University, and Southern University; member of College Football Hall of Fame.	
Annabelle Bernard	1956	Operatic soprano at the Deutsche Oper Berlin	
Débria Brown	1958	Mezzo-Soprano opera singer	
Philip Berrigan	1963	Josephite Catholic priest and lifelong activist.	
John T. Scott	1963	Sculptor, painter, printmaker, collagist, and MacArthur Fellow. Served as Xavier Professor of Art.	
Marie McDemmond	1968	First female president at Norfolk State University, vice president for finance and chief operating officer at Florida Atlantic University	
Gilbert L. Rochon	1968	Sixth President of Tuskegee University.	
Moses Anderson	1968	First black bishop to serve in the Catholic Archdiocese of Detroit; Pastor of Precious Blood Parish, Detroit, MI (1992-2001).	
Bogart Leashore	1968	Dean of the Hunter College school of social work (1991-2003)	
Alexis Herman	1969	First African-American U.S. Secretary of Labor; director of the White House office of Public Liaison.	
Ivan L. R. Lemelle	1971	U.S. Magistrate Judge and U.S. District Court in New Orleans (eight-year terms).	
Vernel Bagneris	1972	Playwright, actor, director, Obie Award Recipient.	
Donald "Slick" Watts	1973	NBA Player for the Seattle Supersonics, New Orleans Jazz, and Houston Rockets.	
Bruce Seals	1973	ABA Player for the Utah Stars, drafted by the Seattle SuperSonics	
Gilda Barabino	1974	President of the Olin College of Engineering, where she is also a professor of biomedical and chemical engineering.	
Regina Benjamin	1979	United States Surgeon General and recipient of MacArthur Genius Award	
Stephen W. Rochon	1984	Director of the Executive Residence and Chief Usher at the White House; Rear Admiral of the Coast Guard.	
Todd Stroger	1985	Elected Cook County, Illinois Board President in 2006, succeeding his father, John Stroger.	
Gary Carter, Jr.	1996	Member of the Louisiana House of Representatives for the Algiers neighborhood of New Orleans.	
LaToya Cantrell	1997	The first African-American female mayor of New Orleans.	
Jared Brossett	2004	Member of the New Orleans City Council; member of the Louisiana House of Representatives for District 97 in Orleans Parish, 2009 to 2014.	
Candice Stewart	2006	First African American Miss Louisiana USA, Miss Louisiana Teen USA, and an NFL cheerleader for the New Orleans Saints and Houston Texans.	
Landon Bussie	2010	Head men's basketball coach at Alcorn State	

== Notable faculty and staff ==
- Arthur P. Bedou – Visiting Photographer; African-American photographer noted for being the personal photographer of Booker T. Washington
- Regina Benjamin – MD, MBA, 18th Surgeon General of the United States
- Thea Bowman - Professor in the Institute for Black Catholic Studies
- Joyce Hooper Corrington – Xavier Director of Research in Science and Associate Professor of Chemistry; American television and film writer including Battle for the Planet of the Apes (1973), General Hospital, and One Life to Live, and the television film The Killer Bees (1974)
- Grace Mary Flickinger SBS (1935–2024) – PhD, biology professor from 1968 to 2016, faculty athletics representative
- Norman C. Francis – Xavier President from 1968 to 2015; Previously served as Dean of Men, Director of Student Personnel Services, Assistant to the President for Student Affairs, Assistant to the President in Charge of Development, and Executive Vice-President prior to his presidential appointment
- Antoine Garibaldi – Xavier Professor and Chair of the Education Department, Dean of Arts and Sciences, and Vice President for Academic Affairs; first lay and first African-American President at University of Detroit Mercy's, and sixth and first African-American President of Gannon University
- Bob Hopkins – Xavier Basketball Coach (1969–1974); NBA Player for the Syracuse Nationals and Philadelphia Tapers; NBA Coach for the Seattle SuperSonics (1974–1977) and New York Knicks (1978–1979)
- Harold Hunter – Xavier Basketball Coach (1974–1977); first African American to sign a contract with any National Basketball Association (NBA) team
- Jerome LeDoux – Xavier University Chaplin, Professor of Philosophy and Theology; African-American priest and author noted for his Afrocentric Catholic Masses, his ebullient style, and his writings
- Ralph Metcalfe – Xavier Professor of Political Science and Track Coach; African-American track and field sprinter, 4-time Olympic medal recipient, and was regarded as the world's fastest human in 1934 and 1935
- Xavier Paul - Xavier Baseball Coach (2024-Present); former MLB outfielder who played for the Los Angeles Dodgers, Cincinnati Reds, Pittsburgh Pirates and Arizona Diamondbacks.
- Pearl Stewart – Xavier Journalist-in-Residence; editor of the Oakland Tribune in 1992 and first African-American woman editor of a major metropolitan daily newspaper
- Michael White – Xavier Professor of Spanish and African-American Music; jazz clarinetist, bandleader, composer, jazz historian, and musical educator

== See also ==
- Gert Town
- St. Katharine Drexel
