= Reynold Verret =

American university president

President of Xavier University of Louisiana
- Incumbent
- Assumed office 2015
- Preceded by: Norman Francis

Personal details
- Born: Charles Reynold Verret c. 1955
- Education: Columbia University (BA); Massachusetts Institute of Technology (MS, PhD)

Charles Reynold Verret is a Haitian-American academic administrator who has served as the sixth (and second lay) president of Xavier University of Louisiana since 2015.

== Biography ==
Verret grew up in Haiti and moved to the United States in 1963. He graduated cum laude with a bachelor's degree in biochemistry from Columbia University and received his Ph.D. in biochemistry from the Massachusetts Institute of Technology. He later served as postdoctoral fellow at the Howard Hughes Institute for Immunology at Yale University and Center for Cancer Research at MIT.

He has served as provost and chief academic officer at Savannah State University from 2012 to 2015, provost at Wilkes University in Wilkes-Barre, Pennsylvania from 2007 to 2012, and as dean of the Misher College of Arts and Sciences and Professor of Chemistry and Biochemistry at the University of the Sciences in Philadelphia from 2002 to 2007. He also served on the faculty of Tulane University and also at Clark Atlanta University, where he was chair of the chemistry department from 1996 to 2002 and served as adjunct professor at Morehouse School of Medicine.

In 2015, Verret was appointed president of Xavier University of Louisiana, the nation's only Catholic HBCU.

== Personal life ==
Verret is Catholic.
