= St. Katharine Drexel Preparatory School =

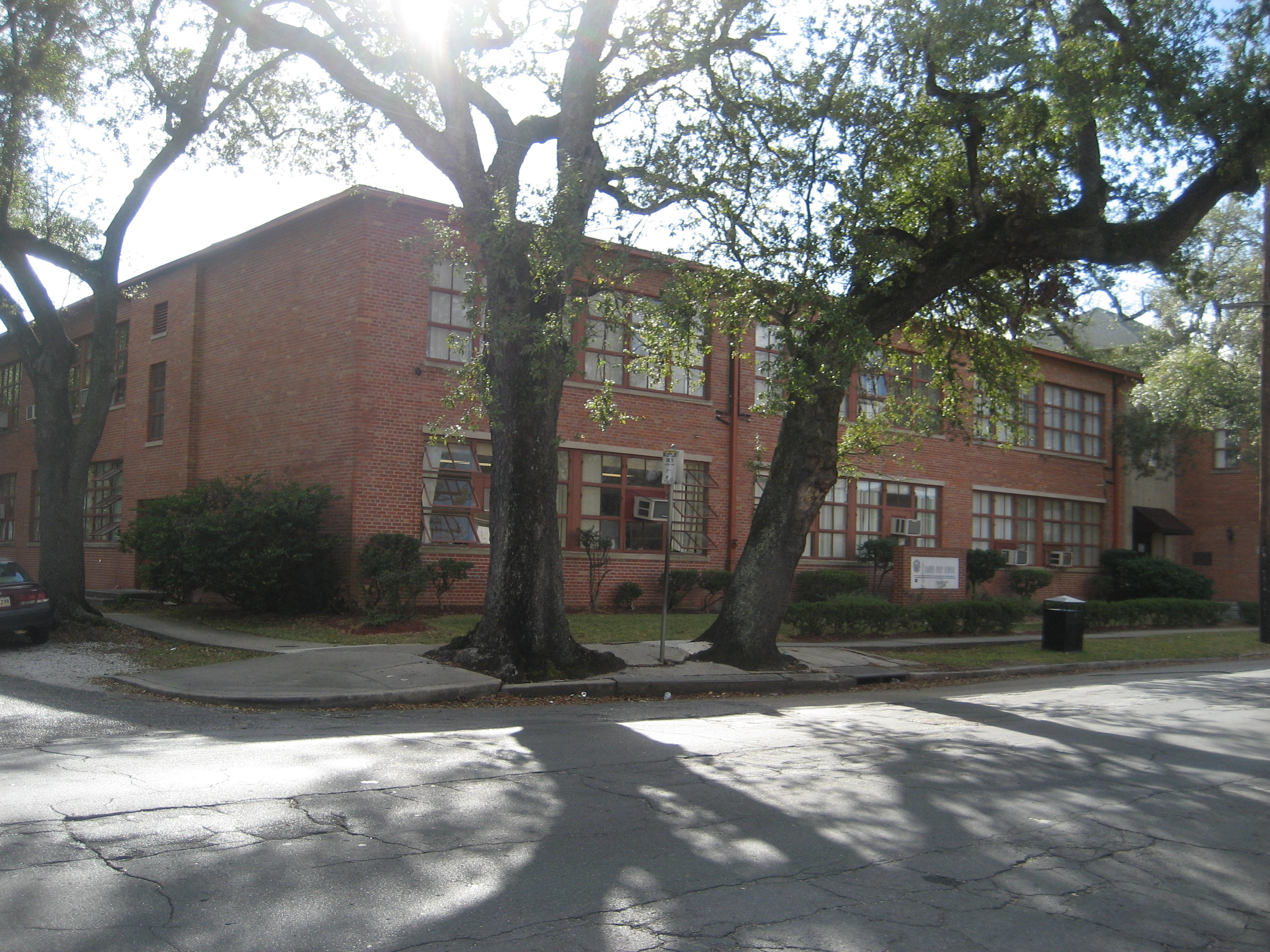
- St. Katharine Drexel Preparatory School building

Location
- 5116 Magazine Street; New Orleans, Louisiana 70115; United States; 29°55′13″N 90°6′37″W

Information
- School type: Private, All-Girls
- Motto: Prepped for Life
- Religious affiliation: Roman Catholic
- Patron saints: St. Katharine Drexel, S.B.S.
- Established: 2013
- School district: Orleans
- President: Sister Margaret Mary Friesenhahn, S.S.N.D.
- Principal: Jacob J. Owens
- Grades: 8–12
- Gender: Female
- Colors: Gold, White and Black
- Slogan: Once a Prepper, Always a Prepper
- Mascot: Ellen the Jacket
- Nickname: Yellow Jackets
- Rival: St. Mary's Cougars
- Accreditation: Southern Association of Colleges and Schools
- Alumni: XPAA
- Website: drexelprep.com

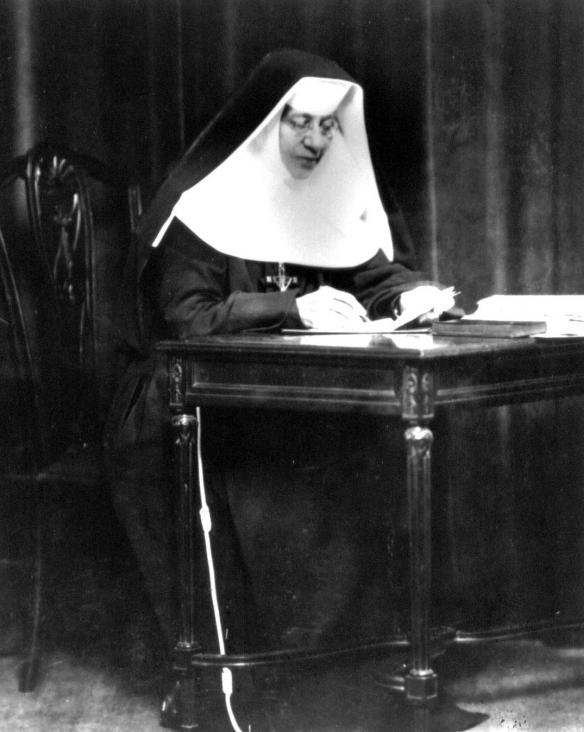
Saint Katharine Drexel

St. Katharine Drexel Preparatory School (also known as Drexel Prep or SKDP) is a private Catholic high school in New Orleans, Louisiana.

== Description ==
It was established in 2013 by six alumni of Xavier University Preparatory School, who purchased the building after the previous school was closed. The school is named for St. Katharine Drexel and remains on the campus of the former school in Uptown New Orleans.

Drexel Prep has no affiliation with St. Katharine Drexel Catholic Church in the Garden District, which instead had a parish school, Holy Ghost School, that closed in 2015.

Drexel Prep students compete in the Louisiana High School Athletic Association.

== See also ==
- Black Catholicism
- Katharine Drexel
