= Xavier University Preparatory School =

- Xavier Prep
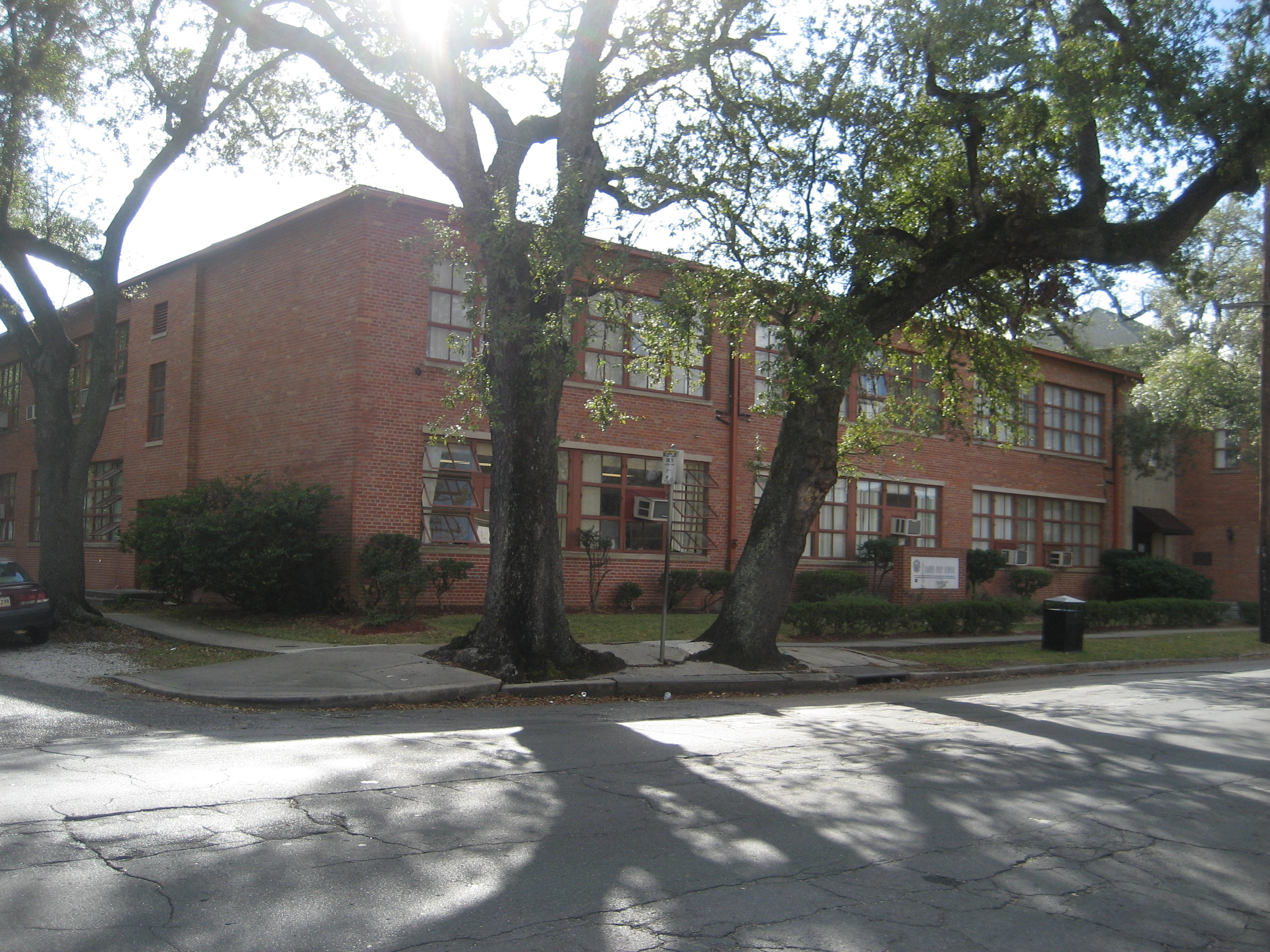
- Xavier Prep in 2008

Location
- 5116 Magazine Street; New Orleans, Louisiana 70115; United States; 29°55′13″N 90°6′37″W

Information
- School type: Private, All-Girls
- Religious affiliation: Roman Catholic
- Established: 1915
- Founder: St. Katharine Drexel
- Status: Closed
- Closed: 2013
- President: Joseph Peychaud Jr.
- Principal: Cheryllyn Branche
- Chaplain: Ramona Ragas
- Grades: 7–12
- Age range: 12-18
- Average class size: 25
- Language: Spanish, Latin
- Hours in school day: 8
- Colors: Gold, White and Black
- Song: "In the Crescent Bend"
- Athletics: Basketball, Volleyball, Cross Country, Softball, Flag Football (seniors only)
- Mascot: Yellow Jackets
- Team name: Yellow Jackets
- Rival: St. Mary's Cougars
- Accreditation: Southern Association of Colleges and Schools
- Tuition: $5,750
- Athletic Director: Don McGhee, Coach Lawrence
- Website: www.xavierprep.com

Xavier University Preparatory School was a private, Catholic high school in New Orleans, Louisiana. The Sisters of the Blessed Sacrament founded, owned and operated the school, having opened it in 1915 as what would eventually become Xavier University of Louisiana.

Andrew Vanacore of The Times Picayune wrote in 2013 that "Xavier Prep has evolved over nearly a century into a symbol of achievement for girls from the city's black middle class." The school closed that same year and reopened months later as St. Katharine Drexel Preparatory School.

== History ==
Xavier Prep was established in 1915 by Saint Katharine Drexel; its first president was a Josephite priest. It was originally intended to be a revival of Southern University, which had recently relocated from Uptown New Orleans to Baton Rouge due to racist opposition to an HBCU being in the neighborhood.

The school would eventually change its name officially to Xavier, and in 1925 became Xavier University of Louisiana. The university would relocate to its current location in Gert Town while the high school remained uptown.

The school was historically for black children only during educational segregation in the United States. It was coeducational until 1970, when it became an all girls' school. It opened to all races as a result of desegregation circa 1970.

It was closed in 2013. Alumni then purchased the school building and reopened it as St. Katharine Drexel Preparatory School the same year.

According to Vanacore, the word "sisterhood" was used to describe the school community and its former students.

== Athletics ==
=== Championships ===
Football championships (4) State Championships: 1936, 1937, 1940, 1941

== Notable alumni ==
- James Booker, musician
- Piper D. Griffin, Judge, Civil District Court in the Parish of Orleans (1980)
- Caroline Hunter, educator
- Sybil Haydel Morial, civil rights activist and educator
- Alden Roche, NFL defensive end (Denver Broncos, Green Bay Packers)

== See also ==
- Black Catholicism
- Katharine Drexel
- Xavier University of Louisiana
- Sisters of the Blessed Sacrament
