= List of Louisiana high school athletic districts =

A list of the basic high school athletic districts in Louisiana (2022–2024 sports seasons):

== Class 5A ==
=== District 1-5A ===
School name	Location	Nickname	Colors
Airline High School	Bossier City, Louisiana	Vikings	
Benton High School	Benton, Louisiana	Tigers	
Byrd High School	Shreveport, Louisiana	Yellow Jackets	
Captain Shreve High School	Shreveport, Louisiana	Gators	
Evangel Christian Academy	Shreveport, Louisiana	Eagles	
Haughton High School	Haughton, Louisiana	Buccaneers	
Huntington High School	Shreveport, Louisiana	Raiders	
Natchitoches Central High School	Natchitoches, Louisiana	Chiefs	
Parkway High School	Bossier City, Louisiana	Panthers	

=== District 2-5A ===
School name	Location	Nickname	Colors
Alexandria Senior High School	Alexandria, Louisiana	Trojans	
Neville High School	Monroe, Louisiana	Tigers	
Ouachita Parish High School	Monroe, Louisiana	Lions	
Pineville High School	Pineville, Louisiana	Rebels	
Ruston High School	Ruston, Louisiana	Bearcats	
West Monroe High School	West Monroe, Louisiana	Rebels	

=== District 3-5A ===
School name	Location	Nickname	Colors
Acadiana High School	Scott, Louisiana	Wreckin' Rams	
Barbe High School	Lake Charles, Louisiana	Buccaneers	
Carencro High School	Carencro, Louisiana	Bears	
Lafayette High School	Lafayette, Louisiana	Lions	
New Iberia Senior High School	New Iberia, Louisiana	Yellow Jackets	
Sam Houston High School	Moss Bluff, Louisiana	Broncos	
Southside High School	Youngsville, Louisiana	Sharks	
Sulphur High School	Sulphur, Louisiana	Golden Tornadoes	

=== District 4-5A ===
School name	Location	Nickname	Colors
Baton Rouge High School	Baton Rouge, Louisiana	Bulldogs	
Catholic High School	Baton Rouge, Louisiana	Bears	
Central High School	Central, Louisiana	Wildcats	
Liberty Magnet High School	Baton Rouge, Louisiana	Patriots	
Scotlandville High School	Baton Rouge, Louisiana	Hornets	
St. Joseph's Academy	Baton Rouge, Louisiana	Redstickers	
Woodlawn High School	Baton Rouge, Louisiana	Panthers	
Zachary High School	Zachary, Louisiana	Broncos	

=== District 5-5A ===
School name	Location	Nickname	Colors
Denham Springs High School	Denham Springs, Louisiana	Yellow Jackets	
Dutchtown High School	Geismar, Louisiana	Griffins	
East Ascension High School	Gonzales, Louisiana	Spartans	
Live Oak High School	Watson, Louisiana	Eagles	
St. Amant High School	St. Amant, Louisiana	Gators	
Walker High School	Walker, Louisiana	Wildcats	

=== District 6-5A ===
School name	Location	Nickname	Colors
Covington High School	Covington, Louisiana	Lions	
Hammond High School	Hammond, Louisiana	Tornadoes	
Mandeville High School	Mandeville, Louisiana	Skippers	
Ponchatoula High School	Ponchatoula, Louisiana	Green Wave	
St. Paul's School	Covington, Louisiana	Wolves	

=== District 7-5A ===
School name	Location	Nickname	Colors
Chalmette High School	Chalmette, Louisiana	Owls	
Fontainebleau High School	Mandeville, Louisiana	Bulldogs	
Northshore High School	Slidell, Louisiana	Panthers	
Salmen High School	Slidell, Louisiana	Spartans	
Slidell High School	Slidell, Louisiana	Tigers	

=== District 8-5A ===
School name	Location	Nickname	Colors
Central Lafourche High School	Mathews, Louisiana	Trojans	
Destrehan High School	Destrehan, Louisiana	Wildcats	
East St. John High School	Reserve, Louisiana	Wildcats	
H.L. Bourgeois High School	Gray, Louisiana	Braves	
Hahnville High School	Boutte, Louisiana	Tigers	
Terrebonne High School	Houma, Louisiana	Tigers	
Thibodaux High School	Thibodaux, Louisiana	Tigers	

=== District 9-5A (Catholic League) ===
School name	Location	Nickname	Colors
Archbishop Chapelle High School	Metairie, Louisiana	Chipmunks	
Archbishop Rummel High School	Metairie, Louisiana	Raiders	
Brother Martin High School	New Orleans, Louisiana	Crusaders	
Dominican High School	New Orleans, Louisiana	None	
Edna Karr High School	New Orleans, Louisiana	Cougars	
Holy Cross School	New Orleans, Louisiana	Tigers	
Jesuit High School	New Orleans, Louisiana	Blue Jays	
John Curtis Christian School	River Ridge, Louisiana	Patriots	
Mount Carmel Academy	New Orleans, Louisiana	Cubs	
St. Augustine High School	New Orleans, Louisiana	Purple Knights	
Warren Easton High School	New Orleans, Louisiana	Eagles	

=== District 10-5A ===
School name	Location	Nickname	Colors
Ben Franklin High School	New Orleans, Louisiana	Falcons	
Bonnabel High School	Kenner, Louisiana	Bruins	
East Jefferson High School	Metairie, Louisiana	Warriors	
Higgins High School	Marrero, Louisiana	Hurricanes	
John Ehret High School	Marrero, Louisiana	Patriots	
Riverdale High School	Jefferson, Louisiana	Rebels	
West Jefferson High School	Harvey, Louisiana	Buccaneers	

== Class 4A ==
=== District 1-4A ===
School name	Location	Nickname	Colors
Booker T. Washington High School	Shreveport, Louisiana	Lions	
Bossier High School	Bossier City, Louisiana	Bearkats	
Caddo Magnet High School	Shreveport, Louisiana	Mustangs	
Loyola College Prep	Shreveport, Louisiana	Flyers	
Minden High School	Minden, Louisiana	Crimson Tide	
North DeSoto High School	Stonewall, Louisiana	Griffins	
Northwood High School	Shreveport, Louisiana	Falcons	
Southwood High School	Shreveport, Louisiana	Cowboys	
Woodlawn Leadership Academy	Shreveport, Louisiana	Knights	

=== District 2-4A ===
School name	Location	Nickname	Colors
Franklin Parish High School	Winnsboro, Louisiana	Patriots	
Grant High School	Dry Prong, Louisiana	Cougars	
Peabody Magnet High School	Alexandria, Louisiana	Warhorses	
Tioga High School	Tioga, Louisiana	Indians	
West Ouachita High School	West Monroe, Louisiana	Chiefs	
Wossman High School	Monroe, Louisiana	Wildcats	

=== District 3-4A ===
School name	Location	Nickname	Colors
DeRidder High School	DeRidder, Louisiana	Dragons	
Eunice High School	Eunice, Louisiana	Bobcats	
Iowa High School	Iowa, Louisiana	Yellow Jackets	
LaGrange High School	Lake Charles, Louisiana	Gators	
Leesville High School	Leesville, Louisiana	Wampus Cats	
Washington-Marion Magnet High School	Lake Charles, Louisiana	Chargin' Indians	

=== District 4-4A ===
School name	Location	Nickname	Colors
Comeaux High School	Lafayette, Louisiana	Spartans	
David Thibodaux STEM Magnet Academy	Lafayette, Louisiana	Bulldogs	
North Vermilion High School	Maurice, Louisiana	Patriots	
Northside High School	Lafayette, Louisiana	Vikings	
Rayne High School	Rayne, Louisiana	Wolves	
St. Thomas More Catholic High School	Lafayette, Louisiana	Cougars	
Teurlings Catholic High School	Lafayette, Louisiana	Rebels	
Westgate High School	New Iberia, Louisiana	Tigers	

=== District 5-4A ===
School name	Location	Nickname	Colors
Beau Chene High School	Arnaudville, Louisiana	Gators	
Breaux Bridge High School	Breaux Bridge, Louisiana	Tigers	
Cecilia High School	Cecilia, Louisiana	Bulldogs	
Livonia High School	Livonia, Louisiana	Wildcats	
Opelousas Senior High School	Opelousas, Louisiana	Tigers	

=== District 6-4A ===
School name	Location	Nickname	Colors
Belaire High School	Baton Rouge, Louisiana	Bengals	
Broadmoor High School	Baton Rouge, Louisiana	Buccaneers	
Brusly High School	Brusly, Louisiana	Panthers	
Istrouma High School	Baton Rouge, Louisiana	Indians	
McKinley High School	Baton Rouge, Louisiana	Panthers	
Plaquemine High School	Plaquemine, Louisiana	Green Devils	
St. Michael the Archangel High School	Baton Rouge, Louisiana	Warriors	
Tara High School	Baton Rouge, Louisiana	Trojans	
West Feliciana High School	St. Francisville, Louisiana	Saints	

=== District 7-4A ===
School name	Location	Nickname	Colors
Archbishop Hannan High School	Covington, Louisiana	Hawks	
Franklinton High School	Franklinton, Louisiana	Demons	
Lakeshore High School	Mandeville, Louisiana	Titans	
Loranger High School	Loranger, Louisiana	Wolves	
Pearl River High School	Pearl River, Louisiana	Rebels	
St. Scholastica Academy	Covington, Louisiana	Doves	

=== District 8-4A ===
School name	Location	Nickname	Colors
Assumption High School	Napoleonville, Louisiana	Mustangs	
Ellender Memorial High School	Houma, Louisiana	Patriots	
E.D. White High School	Thibodaux, Louisiana	Cardinals	
Lutcher High School	Lutcher, Louisiana	Bulldogs	
Morgan City High School	Morgan City, Louisiana	Tigers	
South Lafourche High School	Galliano, Louisiana	Tarpons	
South Terrebonne High School	Bourg, Louisiana	Gators	
Vandebilt Catholic High School	Houma, Louisiana	Terriers	

=== District 9-4A ===
School name	Location	Nickname	Colors
Academy of Our Lady	Marrero, Louisiana	Penguins	
Archbishop Shaw High School	Marrero, Louisiana	Eagles	
Belle Chasse High School	Belle Chasse, Louisiana	Cardinals	
Kenner Discovery Health Sciences Academy	Kenner, Louisiana	Swamp Owls	
St. Charles Catholic High School	Laplace, Louisiana	Comets	
The Willow School	New Orleans, Louisiana	Lions	

=== District 10-4A ===
School name	Location	Nickname	Colors
Abramson Sci Academy	New Orleans, Louisiana	Commodores	
Eleanor McMain Secondary School	New Orleans, Louisiana	Mustangs	
Frederick A. Douglass High School	New Orleans, Louisiana	Bobcats	
G.W. Carver Collegiate Academy	New Orleans, Louisiana	Rams	
McDonogh 35 High School	New Orleans, Louisiana	Roneagles	
New Orleans Charter Science and Math High School	New Orleans, Louisiana	Nautilus	
New Orleans Military and Maritime Academy	New Orleans, Louisiana	Bulldogs	

== Class 3A ==
=== District 1-3A ===
School name	Location	Nickname	Colors
Bastrop High School	Bastrop, Louisiana	Rams	
Carroll High School	Monroe, Louisiana	Bulldogs	
North Webster High School	Springhill, Louisiana	Knights	
Richwood High School	Monroe, Louisiana	Rams	
Sterlington High School	Sterlington, Louisiana	Panthers	

=== District 2-3A ===
School name	Location	Nickname	Colors
Bolton High School	Alexandria, Louisiana	Bears	
Buckeye High School	Deville, Louisiana	Panthers	
Bunkie High School	Bunkie, Louisiana	Panthers	
Caldwell Parish High School	Columbia, Louisiana	Spartans	
Jena High School	Jena, Louisiana	Giants	
Marksville High School	Marksville, Louisiana	Tigers	
Vidalia High School	Vidalia, Louisiana	Vikings	

=== District 3-3A ===
School name	Location	Nickname	Colors
Jennings High School	Jennings, Louisiana	Bulldogs	
Lake Charles College Prep	Lake Charles, Louisiana	Trailblazers	
St. Louis Catholic High School	Lake Charles, Louisiana	Saints	
South Beauregard High School	Longville, Louisiana	Knights	
Westlake High School	Westlake, Louisiana	Rams	

=== District 4-3A ===
School name	Location	Nickname	Colors
Church Point High School	Church Point, Louisiana	Bears	
Crowley High School	Crowley, Louisiana	Gents/Ladies	
Iota High School	Iota, Louisiana	Bulldogs	
Mamou High School	Mamou, Louisiana	Green Demons	
Northwest High School	Opelousas, Louisiana	Raiders	
Pine Prairie High School	Pine Prairie, Louisiana	Panthers	
Ville Platte High School	Ville Platte, Louisiana	Bulldogs	

=== District 5-3A ===
School name	Location	Nickname	Colors
Abbeville High School	Abbeville, Louisiana	Wildcats	
Acadiana Renaissance Charter	Youngsville, Louisiana	Eagles	
Erath High School	Erath, Louisiana	Bobcats	
Kaplan High School	Kaplan, Louisiana	Pirates	
St. Martinville Senior High School	St. Martinville, Louisiana	Tigers	

=== District 6-3A ===
School name	Location	Nickname	Colors
Collegiate School	Baton Rouge, Louisiana	Dolphins	
GEO Next Generation High School	Baton Rouge, Louisiana	Tigers	
Glen Oaks High School	Baton Rouge, Louisiana	Panthers	
Helix Mentorship Academy	Baton Rouge, Louisiana	Sharks	
Madison Preparatory Academy	Baton Rouge, Louisiana	Chargers	
Parkview Baptist High School	Baton Rouge, Louisiana	Eagles	
Port Allen High School	Port Allen, Louisiana	Pelicans	
University High School	Baton Rouge, Louisiana	Cubs	

=== District 7-3A ===
School name	Location	Nickname	Colors
Berwick High School	Berwick, Louisiana	Panthers	
Donaldsonville High School	Donaldsonville, Louisiana	Tigers	
Patterson High School	Patterson, Louisiana	Lumberjacks	
St. James High School	Vacherie, Louisiana	Wildcats	

=== District 8-3A ===
School name	Location	Nickname	Colors
Albany High School	Albany, Louisiana	Hornets	
Amite High School	Amite City, Louisiana	Warriors	
Bogalusa High School	Bogalusa, Louisiana	Lumberjacks	
Doyle High School	Livingston, Louisiana	Tigers	
Jewel Sumner High School	Tangipahoa, Louisiana	Cowboys	
Pine High School	Franklinton, Louisiana	Raiders	
Springfield High School	Springfield, Louisiana	Bulldogs	

=== District 9-3A ===
School name	Location	Nickname	Colors
Fisher High School	Lafitte, Louisiana	Gators	
Haynes Academy	Metairie, Louisiana	Yellow Jackets	
Jefferson RISE Charter School	Harvey, Louisiana	Blazers	
Patrick F. Taylor Academy	Avondale, Louisiana	Tigers	
Thomas Jefferson High School	Gretna, Louisiana	Jaguars	
Young Audiences Charter School	Gretna, Louisiana	Yaks	

=== District 10-3A ===
School name	Location	Nickname	Colors
Academy of the Sacred Heart	New Orleans, Louisiana	Cardinals	
Booker T. Washington High School	New Orleans, Louisiana	Lions	
Cabrini High School	New Orleans, Louisiana	Crescents	
De La Salle High School	New Orleans, Louisiana	Cavaliers	
John F. Kennedy High School	New Orleans, Louisiana	Cougars	
L.B. Landry College and Career Preparatory High School	New Orleans, Louisiana	Lions	
Livingston Collegiate Academy	New Orleans, Louisiana	Wolfpack	
Morris Jeff Community School	New Orleans, Louisiana	Pelicans	
Sophie B. Wright Charter School	New Orleans, Louisiana	Warriors	
Ursuline Academy	New Orleans, Louisiana	Lions	

== Class 2A ==
=== District 1-2A ===
School name	Location	Nickname	Colors
Calvary Baptist Academy	Shreveport, Louisiana	Cavaliers	
D'Arbonne Woods Charter School	Farmerville, Louisiana	Timberwolves	
Green Oaks High School	Shreveport, Louisiana	Giants	
Homer High School	Homer, Louisiana	Pelicans	
Magnolia School of Excellence	Shreveport, Louisiana	Mariners	
North Caddo High School	Vivian, Louisiana	Titans	
Union Parish High School	Farmerville, Louisiana	Farmers	

=== District 2-2A ===
School name	Location	Nickname	Colors
Beekman Charter School	Bastrop, Louisiana	Tigers	
Delhi Charter School	Delhi, Louisiana	Gators	
Ferriday High School	Ferriday, Louisiana	Trojans	
Madison High School	Tallulah, Louisiana	Jaguars	
Mangham High School	Mangham, Louisiana	Dragons	
Oak Grove High School	Oak Grove, Louisiana	Tigers	
Ouachita Christian High School	Monroe, Louisiana	Eagles	
Rayville High School	Rayville, Louisiana	Hornets	

=== District 3-2A ===
School name	Location	Nickname	Colors
Lakeside High School	Sibley, Louisiana	Warriors	
Mansfield High School	Mansfield, Louisiana	Wolverines	
Many High School	Many, Louisiana	Tigers	
Red River Senior High School	Coushatta, Louisiana	Bulldogs	
Winnfield Senior High School	Winnfield, Louisiana	Tigers	

=== District 4-2A ===
School name	Location	Nickname	Colors
DeQuincy High School	DeQuincy, Louisiana	Tigers	
East Beauregard High School	Dry Creek, Louisiana	Trojans	
Pickering High School	Leesville, Louisiana	Red Devils	
Rosepine High School	Rosepine, Louisiana	Eagles	
Vinton High School	Vinton, Louisiana	Lions	

=== District 5-2A ===
School name	Location	Nickname	Colors
Avoyelles High School	Moreauville, Louisiana	Mustangs	
Holy Savior Menard High School	Alexandria, Louisiana	Eagles	
Kinder High School	Kinder, Louisiana	Yellow Jackets	
Oakdale High School	Oakdale, Louisiana	Warriors	
Port Barre High School	Port Barre, Louisiana	Red Devils	
Rapides High School	Lecompte, Louisiana	Mustangs	

=== District 6-2A ===
School name	Location	Nickname	Colors
Lafayette Christian Academy	Lafayette, Louisiana	Eagles	
Lafayette Renaissance Charter	Lafayette, Louisiana	Tigers	
Lake Arthur High School	Lake Arthur, Louisiana	Tigers	
Midland High School	Midland, Louisiana	Rebels	
Notre Dame High School	Crowley, Louisiana	Pioneers	
Welsh High School	Welsh, Louisiana	Greyhounds	

=== District 7-2A ===
School name	Location	Nickname	Colors
Catholic High School	New Iberia, Louisiana	Panthers	
Delcambre High School	Delcambre, Louisiana	Tigers	
Franklin Senior High School	Franklin, Louisiana	Hornets	
Houma Christian School	Houma, Louisiana	Warriors	
Loreauville High School	Loreauville, Louisiana	Tigers	
West St. Mary High School	Baldwin, Louisiana	Wolfpack	

=== District 8-2A ===
School name	Location	Nickname	Colors
Baker High School	Baker, Louisiana	Buffaloes	
Capitol High School	Baton Rouge, Louisiana	Lions	
The Dunham School	Baton Rouge, Louisiana	Tigers	
East Feliciana High School	Jackson, Louisiana	Tigers	
Episcopal High School	Baton Rouge, Louisiana	Knights	
Northeast High School	Pride, Louisiana	Vikings	
Slaughter Community Charter School	Slaughter, Louisiana	Knights	

=== District 9-2A ===
School name	Location	Nickname	Colors
French Settlement High School	French Settlement, Louisiana	Lions	
Independence High School	Independence, Louisiana	Tigers	
Northlake Christian School	Covington, Louisiana	Wolverines	
Pope John Paul II High School	Slidell, Louisiana	Jaguars	
St. Helena College and Career Academy	Greensburg, Louisiana	Hawks	
St. Thomas Aquinas High School	Hammond, Louisiana	Falcons	

=== District 10-2A ===
School name	Location	Nickname	Colors
Cohen College Prep High School	New Orleans, Louisiana	Hornets	
Dr. King Charter School	New Orleans, Louisiana	Jaguars	
Drexel Prep School	New Orleans, Louisiana	Yellow Jackets	
International High School of New Orleans	New Orleans, Louisiana	Panthers	
Isidore Newman School	New Orleans, Louisiana	Greenies	
Metairie Park Country Day School	Metairie, Louisiana	Cajuns	
St. Mary's Academy	New Orleans, Louisiana	Cougars	
Sarah T. Reed High School	New Orleans, Louisiana	Olympians	
South Plaquemines High School	Buras, Louisiana	Hurricanes	

== Class 1A ==
=== District 1-1A ===
School name	Location	Nickname	Colors
Arcadia High School	Arcadia, Louisiana	Hornets	
Cedar Creek School	Ruston, Louisiana	Cougars	
Glenbrook School	Minden, Louisiana	Apaches	
Haynesville High School	Haynesville, Louisiana	Golden Tornado	
Jonesboro-Hodge High School	Jonesboro, Louisiana	Tigers	
Lincoln Preparatory School	Grambling, Louisiana	Panthers	
Plain Dealing High School	Plain Dealing, Louisiana	Lions	
Ringgold High School	Ringgold, Louisiana	Redskins	

=== District 2-1A ===
School name	Location	Nickname	Colors
Block High School	Jonesville, Louisiana	Bears	
Delhi High School	Delhi, Louisiana	Bears	
Delta Charter School	Ferriday, Louisiana	Storm	
General Trass High School	Lake Providence, Louisiana	Panthers	
St. Frederick High School	Monroe, Louisiana	Warriors	
Tensas High School	St. Joseph, Louisiana	Panthers	

=== District 3-1A ===
School name	Location	Nickname	Colors
Lakeview High School	Campti, Louisiana	Gators	
LaSalle High School	Olla, Louisiana	Tigers	
Logansport High School	Logansport, Louisiana	Tigers	
Montgomery High School	Montgomery, Louisiana	Tigers	
Northwood-Lena High School	Lena, Louisiana	Gators	
St. Mary's High School	Natchitoches, Louisiana	Tigers	

=== District 4-1A ===
School name	Location	Nickname	Colors
Basile High School	Basile, Louisiana	Bearcats	
Elton High School	Elton, Louisiana	Indians	
Grand Lake High School	Grand Lake, Louisiana	Hornets	
Hamilton Christian Academy	Lake Charles, Louisiana	Warriors	
Merryville High School	Merryville, Louisiana	Panthers	
Oberlin High School	Oberlin, Louisiana	Tigers	

=== District 5-1A ===
School name	Location	Nickname	Colors
Berchmans Academy	Grand Coteau, Louisiana	Saints	
Catholic High School of Pointe Coupee	New Roads, Louisiana	Hornets	
JS Clark Leadership Academy	Opelousas, Louisiana	Bulldogs	
North Central High School	Lebeau, Louisiana	Hurricanes	
Opelousas Catholic School	Opelousas, Louisiana	Vikings	
Sacred Heart High School	Ville Platte, Louisiana	Trojans	
St. Edmund High School	Eunice, Louisiana	Blue Jays	
Westminster Christian Academy	Opelousas, Louisiana	Crusaders	

=== District 6-1A ===
School name	Location	Nickname	Colors
Ascension Episcopal School	Youngsville, Louisiana	Blue Gators	
Gueydan High School	Gueydan, Louisiana	Bears	
Highland Baptist Christian School	New Iberia, Louisiana	Bears	
Vermilion Catholic High School	Abbeville, Louisiana	Eagles	
Westminster Christian Academy-Lafayette	Lafayette, Louisiana	Chargers	

=== District 7-1A ===
School name	Location	Nickname	Colors
Centerville High School	Centerville, Louisiana	Bulldogs	
Central Catholic High School	Morgan City, Louisiana	Eagles	
Covenant Christian Academy	Houma, Louisiana	Lions	
Hanson Memorial High School	Franklin, Louisiana	Tigers	
Jeanerette Senior High School	Jeanerette, Louisiana	Tigers	

=== District 8-1A ===
School name	Location	Nickname	Colors
Ascension Catholic High School	Donaldsonville, Louisiana	Bulldogs	
Ascension Christian High School	Gonzales, Louisiana	Lions	
East Iberville High School	St. Gabriel, Louisiana	Tigers	
North Iberville High School	Rosedale, Louisiana	Bears	
St. John High School	Plaquemine, Louisiana	Eagles	
White Castle High School	White Castle, Louisiana	Bulldogs	

=== District 9-1A ===
School name	Location	Nickname	Colors
Central Private School	Central, Louisiana	Redhawks	
Kentwood High School	Kentwood, Louisiana	Kangaroos	
Southern Lab School	Baton Rouge, Louisiana	Kittens	
Thrive Academy	Baton Rouge, Louisiana	Bulldogs	

=== District 10-1A ===
School name	Location	Nickname	Colors
Crescent City Christian School	Metairie, Louisiana	Pioneers	
Ecole Classique	Metairie, Louisiana	Spartans	
Living School of New Orleans	New Orleans, Louisiana	Legends	
Lycée Français	New Orleans, Louisiana	Loup-Garou	
McGehee School	New Orleans, Louisiana	Hawks	
Riverside Academy	Reserve, Louisiana	Rebels	
St. Martin's Episcopal School	Metairie, Louisiana	Saints	
St. Thérèse Academy	Metairie, Louisiana	Phoenix	
Varnado High School	Angie, Louisiana	Wildcats	
West St. John High School	Edgard, Louisiana	Rams	

== Class B ==
=== District 1-B ===
School name	Location	Nickname	Colors
Castor High School	Castor, Louisiana	Tigers	
Doyline High School	Doyline, Louisiana	Panthers	
Quitman High School	Quitman, Louisiana	Wolverines	
Weston High School	Weston, Louisiana	Wolves	

=== District 2-B ===
School name	Location	Nickname	Colors
Choudrant High School	Choudrant, Louisiana	Aggies	
Downsville Community Charter School	Downsville, Louisiana	Demons	
Family Community Christian School	Winnsboro, Louisiana	Warriors	
Forest High School	Forest, Louisiana	Bulldogs	
Simsboro High School	Simsboro, Louisiana	Tigers	

=== District 3-B ===
School name	Location	Nickname	Colors
Converse High School	Converse, Louisiana	Wildcats	
Florien High School	Florien, Louisiana	Blackcats	
Negreet High School	Negreet, Louisiana	Indians	
Stanley High School	Stanley, Louisiana	Panthers	
Zwolle High School	Zwolle, Louisiana	Hawks	

=== District 4-B ===
School name	Location	Nickname	Colors
Anacoco High School	Anacoco, Louisiana	Indians	
Elizabeth High School	Elizabeth, Louisiana	Bulldogs	
Fairview High School	Grant, Louisiana	Panthers	
Hicks High School	Hicks, Louisiana	Pirates	
Pitkin High School	Pitkin, Louisiana	Tigers	

=== District 5-B ===
School name	Location	Nickname	Colors
Avoyelles Public Charter School	Mansura, Louisiana	Vikings	
Glenmora High School	Glenmora, Louisiana	Wildcats	
Grace Christian School	Alexandria, Louisiana	Warriors	
Monterey High School	Monterey, Louisiana	Wolves	
Oak Hill High School	Hineston, Louisiana	Rams	

=== District 6-B ===
School name	Location	Nickname	Colors
Academy of the Sacred Heart	Grand Coteau, Louisiana	Saints	
Bell City High School	Bell City, Louisiana	Bruins	
Episcopal School of Acadiana	Cade, Louisiana	Falcons	
Hathaway High School	Hathaway, Louisiana	Hornets	
Lacassine High School	Lacassine, Louisiana	Cardinals	

=== District 7-B ===
School name	Location	Nickname	Colors
Christ Episcopal School	Covington, Louisiana	Wildcats	
Holden High School	Holden, Louisiana	Rockets	
Mount Hermon High School	Mount Hermon, Louisiana	Yellow Jackets	

== Class C ==
=== District 1-C ===
School name	Location	Nickname	Colors
Claiborne Christian School	West Monroe, Louisiana	Crusaders	
Gibsland–Coleman High School	Gibsland, Louisiana	Bulldogs	
New Living Word School	Ruston, Louisiana	Lions	
Saline High School	Saline, Louisiana	Bobcats	
Summerfield High School	Summerfield, Louisiana	Rebels	

=== District 2-C ===
School name	Location	Nickname	Colors
Calvin High School	Calvin, Louisiana	Cougars	
Dodson High School	Dodson, Louisiana	Panthers	
Georgetown High School	Georgetown, Louisiana	Bulldogs	
Harrisonburg High School	Harrisonburg, Louisiana	Rams	
Sicily Island High School	Sicily Island, Louisiana	Tigers	

=== District 3-C ===
School name	Location	Nickname	Colors
Ebarb High School	Noble, Louisiana	Rebels	
Evans High School	Evans, Louisiana	Eagles	
Hornbeck High School	Hornbeck, Louisiana	Hornets	
Pleasant Hill High School	Pleasant Hill, Louisiana	Eagles	
Simpson High School	Simpson, Louisiana	Broncos	

=== District 4-C ===
School name	Location	Nickname	Colors
Alexandria Country Day High School	Alexandria, Louisiana	Tigers	
Central High School	Jonesville, Louisiana	Panthers	
Plainview High School	Glenmora, Louisiana	Hornets	
St. Joseph High School	Plaucheville, Louisiana	Eagles	

=== District 5-C ===
School name	Location	Nickname	Colors
Hackberry High School	Hackberry, Louisiana	Mustangs	
Johnson Bayou High School	Johnson Bayou, Louisiana	Rebels	
Singer High School	Singer, Louisiana	Hornets	
South Cameron High School	Creole, Louisiana	Tarpons	
Starks High School	Starks, Louisiana	Panthers	

=== District 6-C ===
School name	Location	Nickname	Colors
Glencoe Charter School	Franklin, Louisiana	Gators	
Northside Christian High School	Crowley, Louisiana	Warriors	
Reeves High School	Reeves, Louisiana	Red Raiders	

=== District 7-C ===
School name	Location	Nickname	Colors
False River Academy	New Roads, Louisiana	Gators	
Family Christian Academy	Baton Rouge, Louisiana	Flames	
Jehovah-Jireh Christian Academy	Baton Rouge, Louisiana	Warriors	
Louisiana School for the Deaf	Baton Rouge, Louisiana	War Eagles	
Louisiana School for the Visually Impaired	Baton Rouge, Louisiana	Trojans	
Maurepas High School	Maurepas, Louisiana	Wolves	

=== District 8-C ===
School name	Location	Nickname	Colors
First Baptist Christian School	Slidell, Louisiana	Eagles	
Grand Isle High School	Grand Isle, Louisiana	Trojans	
Lutheran High School	Metairie, Louisiana	Gryphons	
Phoenix High School	Braithwaite, Louisiana	Spartans	

== See also ==
- Louisiana High School Athletic Association (LHSAA)
