= Vernon Parish, Louisiana =

Parish in Louisiana, United States

Coordinates: 31.11°N 93.19°W

- Parish
- Parish of Vernon; Paroisse de Vernon (French)
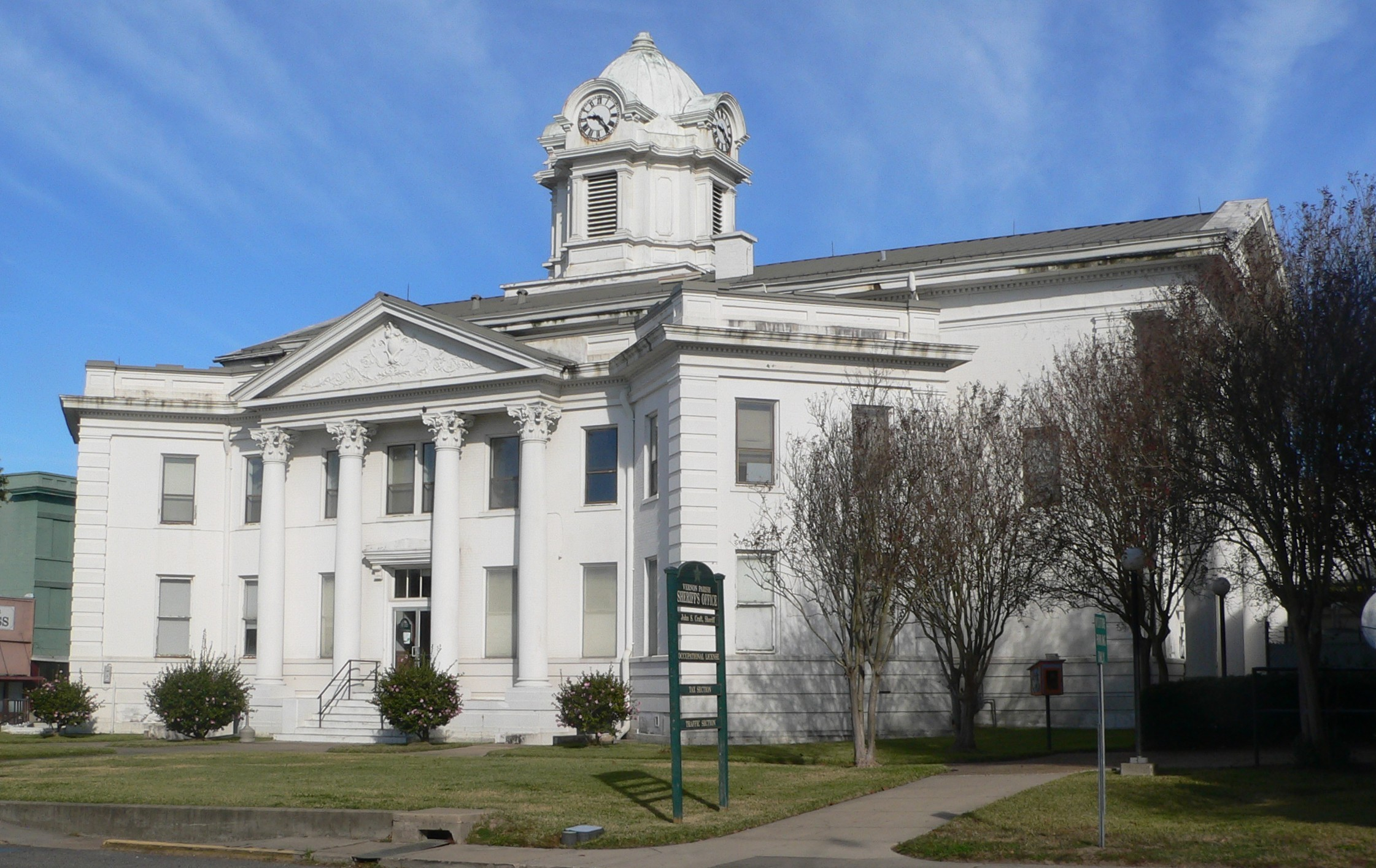
- Vernon Parish courthouse in Leesville

- Seal

- Location within the U.S. state of Louisiana

- Louisiana's location within the U.S.
- Country: United States
- State: Louisiana
- Region: Central Louisiana
- Founded: March 30, 1871 (155 years ago)
- Named for: Mount Vernon
- Parish seat: Leesville
- Largest municipality: Simpson (area); Leesville (population)
- Incorporated municipalities: 6 (total): 1 city, 3 towns, and 2 villages; (located entirely or partially within parish boundaries)

Area
  - Total: 1,341 sq mi (3,470 km^{2})
  - Land: 1,328 sq mi (3,440 km^{2})
  - Water: 14 sq mi (36 km^{2})
  - percentage: 1.0 sq mi (2.6 km^{2})

Population (2020)
  - Total: 48,750
  - Estimate (2025): 45,091 ▼
  - Density: 36.71/sq mi (14.17/km^{2})
- Time zone: UTC-6 (CST)
  - Summer (DST): UTC-5 (CDT)
- Area code: 337
- Congressional district: 4th
- Website: Vernon Parish Police Jury

Vernon Parish (French: Paroisse de Vernon) is a parish located in the U.S. state of Louisiana. As of the 2020 census, the population was 48,750. The parish seat and most populous municipality is Leesville. Bordered on the west by the Sabine River, the parish was founded in 1871 during the Reconstruction era.

It was long a center of the timber industry, which harvested pine in the hills and bottomland hardwoods. Construction of a railway to the area in 1897 stimulated the marketing of lumber and businesses in the area.

Since World War II, Fort Polk, formerly Fort Johnson, has been most important to the parish economy. The population of the Leesville area rapidly increased fivefold after the fort was opened. Vernon Parish is part of the Fort Polk South, LA Micropolitan Statistical Area, which is also included in the DeRidder-Fort Polk South, LA Combined Statistical Area.

== History ==
The area comprising Vernon was a part of a tract of land whose control was disputed in the late 18th century between the United States and Spain. They called this land the "Neutral Strip" and refrained from posting police or military personnel there. As a result, the area became a haven for outlaws. Prior to the United States acquisition of this territory through the Louisiana Purchase from France in 1803, the primary settlers who came to the area were ethnic French and Spanish.

During this period, Dr. Timothy Burr, a Massachusetts native who had migrated to Louisiana from Mt. Vernon, Ohio, established the community of Burr Ferry at his landing on the Sabine River. This community became known as the "Gateway to Louisiana" from the west. For decades this area was part of the Natchitoches, Rapides, and Sabine parishes, which were established soon after the US acquired this territory in the early nineteenth century. The timber industry was most important to the local economy, with both pines of the hills and bottomland hardwoods being harvested. Some landowners had their land cleared by slaves to establish plantations for cotton cultivation.

During the American Civil War, an artillery site was constructed nearby. Now called the "Confederate Breast Works", it was manned by the Confederacy to guard against Union movements along the Nolan Trace.

On March 30. 1871, the Louisiana General Assembly passed an act to create Vernon Parish, by taking territory from the three parishes noted above, as population had increased in the area. There are four versions of how the parish was named; the only official State version is that it was named in honor of Mt. Vernon, the home of George Washington.

Leesville was designated as the parish seat of Vernon from the start. It was incorporated February 15, 1900. The city was founded by Dr. Edmund E. Smart, who donated land from his plantation for the development of the parish seat. It was named by Senator John Rowell Smart, his father, in honor of General Robert E. Lee. The Big House from the Smart plantation still stands, where the city has grown up around it. It is located at what today is the corner of Lula and First streets.

In folklore there are different claims about who it was named for, including:

- A race horse owned by Joe Moore, one of the members of the committee chosen to name the parish, who said that by naming the parish after his fast horse the committee would insure the growth of the parish.
- A popular teacher who had been an officer in the Royal Navy, only mentioned as "Mr. Vernon". The decision was made to avoid disputes among the parish founders, each of whom wanted to name it after himself.
- A mule pulling a cart past a store in which the committee was arguing over the name while drinking. To preserve his whiskey the storekeeper suggested they ask a man driving a cart his mule's name, which the man said was Vernon.

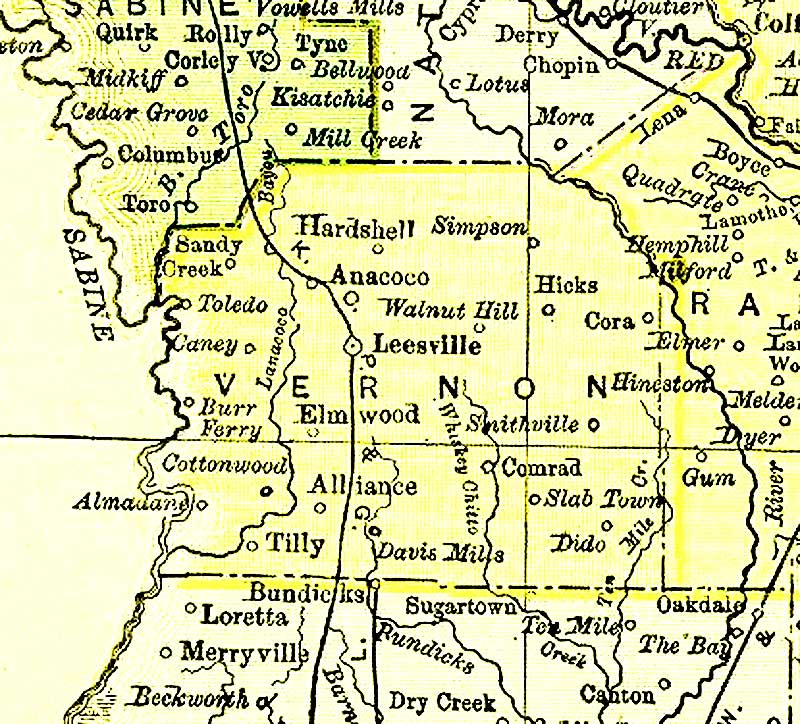
Vernon Parish map, 1895

Old First National Bank Building in downtown Leesville, LA, now the Courthouse Annex building

In the late 1890s the timber industry, which was the dominant industry in the parish from its creation, began to boom with the construction of the Kansas City Southern Railway in 1897. It increased access to markets. The railway continues to operate in the early 21st century.

=== 20th century to present ===
In the period after World War I, Vernon Parish became the site of two socialist-based communities. The Llano del Rio Cooperative Colony developed as New Llano, established in 1917. The second was the Christian Commonwealth Colony. These colonies attempted to attract economists and sociologists to conduct an experiment in communal membership and the sharing of labor duties. Llano del Rio was the larger community, with more than 10,000 people, and was also the longest-surviving. Both colonies failed in the 1930s during the economic stress of the Great Depression.

In 1941, the United States Army opened Camp Polk, shortly after the outbreak of war in Europe, with the German invasion of Poland and other actions. Camp Polk quickly surpassed the timber industry as the dominant force in the parish's economy. After the camp opened, the population of the parish seat of Leesville rapidly climbed from 3,500 to 18,000. Named after Leonidas Polk, the first Episcopal Bishop in Louisiana and known as the "Fighting Bishop of the Confederacy", it served as one of the major Army training camps during World War II.

In the 21st century, Fort Polk is the 5th-largest military installation in the nation. The facility covers approximately 200,000 acres (810 km^{2}). It has stimulated the development of associated businesses in the area and related populations. With the regular reassignment of soldiers, accompanied by dependents, to and from the fort, Vernon Parish has a more varied culture than might be expected from its location. Its residents come from all over the country.

== Geography ==
According to the U.S. Census Bureau, the parish has a total area of 1,341 square miles (3,470 km^{2}), of which 1,328 square miles (3,440 km^{2}) is land and 14 square miles (36 km^{2}) (1.0%) is water. It is the largest parish in Louisiana by land area.

=== Major highways ===
- U.S. Highway 171
- Louisiana Highway 8
- Louisiana Highway 10
- Louisiana Highway 28
- Louisiana Highway 111
- Louisiana Highway 113
- Louisiana Highway 117
- Louisiana Highway 121
- Louisiana Highway 184
- Louisiana Highway 377
- Louisiana Highway 392
- Louisiana Highway 399
- Louisiana Highway 458
- Louisiana Highway 463
- Louisiana Highway 464
- Louisiana Highway 465
- Louisiana Highway 467
- Louisiana Highway 468
- Louisiana Highway 469
- Louisiana Highway 473
- Louisiana Highway 489
- Louisiana Highway 1146
- Louisiana Highway 1211
- Louisiana Highway 1213
- Louisiana Highway 3226

=== Adjacent parishes and counties ===
- Sabine Parish (northwest)
- Natchitoches Parish (north)
- Rapides Parish (east)
- Allen Parish (southeast)
- Beauregard Parish (south)
- Newton County, Texas (west)

=== National protected area ===
- Kisatchie National Forest (part)

== Demographics ==
Historical population
Census	Pop.	Note	%±
1880	5,160		—
1890	5,903		14.4%
1900	10,327		74.9%
1910	17,384		68.3%
1920	20,493		17.9%
1930	20,047		−2.2%
1940	19,142		−4.5%
1950	18,974		−0.9%
1960	18,301		−3.5%
1970	53,794		193.9%
1980	53,475		−0.6%
1990	61,961		15.9%
2000	52,531		−15.2%
2010	52,334		−0.4%
2020	48,750		−6.8%
2025 (est.)	45,091	▼	−7.5%
U.S. Decennial Census; 1790–1960 1900–1990; 1990–2000 2010

=== 2020 census ===
As of the 2020 census, the parish had a population of 48,750 and 12,375 families residing there.

As of the 2020 census, the median age was 32.8 years. 25.6% of residents were under the age of 18 and 13.1% of residents were 65 years of age or older. For every 100 females there were 104.4 males, and for every 100 females age 18 and over there were 104.4 males age 18 and over.

As of the 2020 census, the racial makeup of the parish was 72.0% White, 13.3% Black or African American, 1.2% American Indian and Alaska Native, 1.8% Asian, 0.6% Native Hawaiian and Pacific Islander, 2.7% from some other race, and 8.4% from two or more races. Hispanic or Latino residents of any race comprised 8.6% of the population.

As of the 2020 census, 42.2% of residents lived in urban areas, while 57.8% lived in rural areas.

As of the 2020 census, there were 18,761 households in the parish, of which 34.6% had children under the age of 18 living in them. Of all households, 50.7% were married-couple households, 20.6% were households with a male householder and no spouse or partner present, and 23.9% were households with a female householder and no spouse or partner present. About 27.9% of all households were made up of individuals and 9.4% had someone living alone who was 65 years of age or older.

As of the 2020 census, there were 21,953 housing units, of which 14.5% were vacant. Among occupied housing units, 56.7% were owner-occupied and 43.3% were renter-occupied. The homeowner vacancy rate was 1.3% and the rental vacancy rate was 13.4%.

=== Racial and ethnic composition ===
Vernon Parish, Louisiana – Racial and ethnic composition Note: the US Census treats Hispanic/Latino as an ethnic category. This table excludes Latinos from the racial categories and assigns them to a separate category. Hispanics/Latinos may be of any race.
Race / Ethnicity (NH = Non-Hispanic)	Pop 1980	Pop 1990	Pop 2000	Pop 2010	Pop 2020	% 1980	% 1990	% 2000	% 2010	% 2020
White alone (NH)	40,295	44,012	37,483	37,794	33,599	75.35%	71.03%	71.35%	72.22%	68.92%
Black or African American alone (NH)	9,641	12,626	8,782	7,280	6,325	18.03%	20.38%	16.72%	13.91%	12.97%
Native American or Alaska Native alone (NH)	238	416	712	684	484	0.45%	0.67%	1.36%	1.31%	0.99%
Asian alone (NH)	893	1,419	786	881	862	1.67%	2.29%	1.50%	1.68%	1.77%
Native Hawaiian or Pacific Islander alone (NH)	x	x	152	242	289	x	x	0.29%	0.46%	0.59%
Other race alone (NH)	169	83	84	62	274	0.32%	0.13%	0.16%	0.12%	0.56%
Mixed race or Multiracial (NH)	x	x	1,421	1,616	2,742	x	x	2.71%	3.09%	5.62%
Hispanic or Latino (any race)	2,239	3,405	3,111	3,775	4,175	4.19%	5.50%	5.92%	7.21%	8.56%
Total	53,475	61,961	52,531	52,334	48,750	100.00%	100.00%	100.00%	100.00%	100.00%

== Education ==
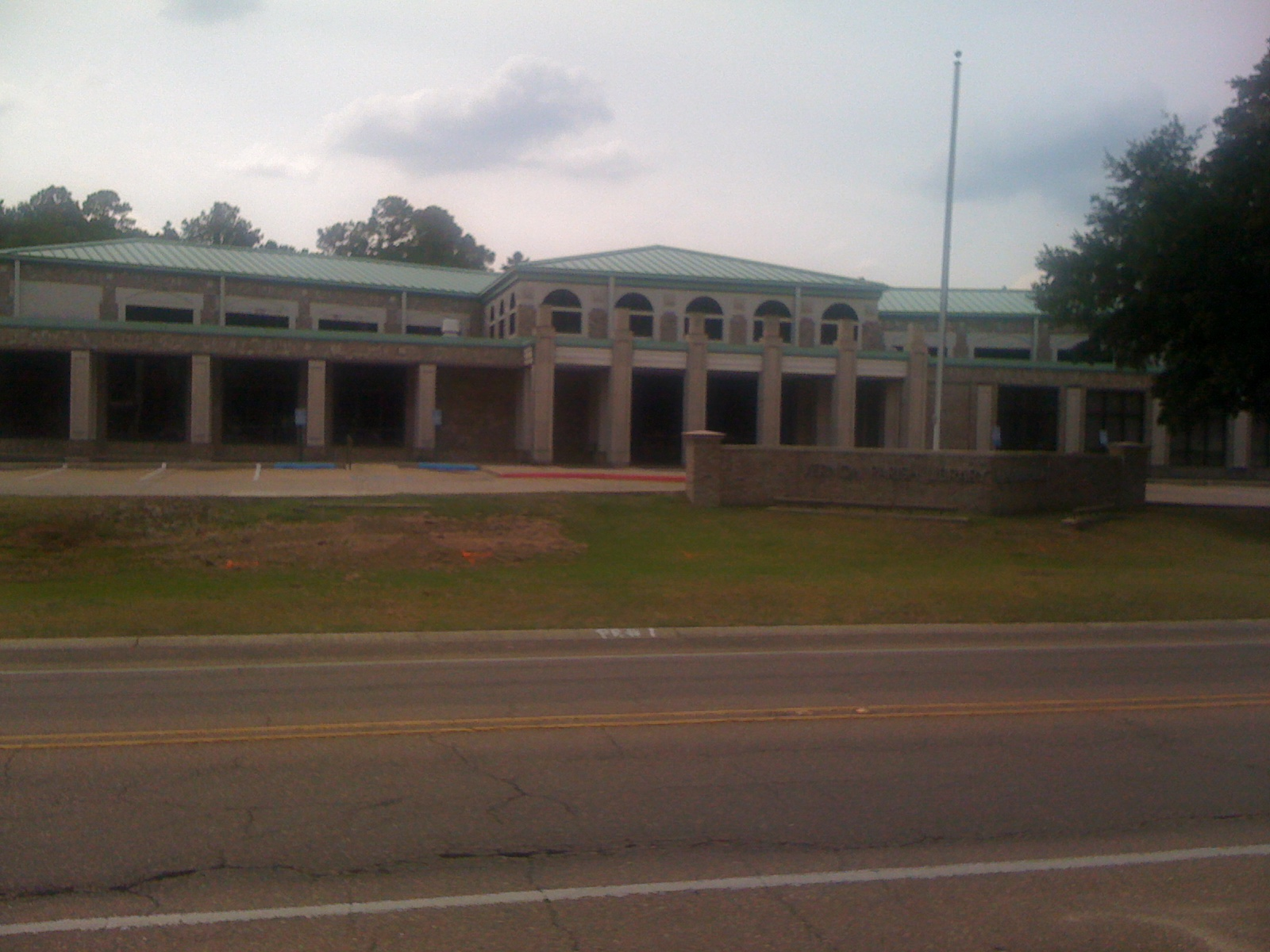
The Vernon Parish Library in Leesville

=== Primary and secondary education ===
All public schools in Vernon Parish are operated by the Vernon Parish School Board, which operates 18 public schools and one optional school. Schools providing a secondary education include:

- Evans High School (Grades PK-12)
- Hicks High School (Grades PK-12)
- Hornbeck High School (Grades PK-12)
- Pitkin High School (Grades PK-12)
- Simpson High School (Grades PK-12)
- Anacoco High School (Grades 7–12)
- Pickering High School (Grades 7–12)
- Rosepine Junior/Senior High School (Grades 7–12)
- Leesville High School (Grades 9–12)
- Vernon Parish Optional School (Grades 7–12)
- Faith training Christian academy (private k4-12)

=== Colleges and universities ===
The Louisiana Technical College (LTC) system operates the Lamar Salter campus south of New Llano. The Central Louisiana Technical College Lamar Salter campus is one of 40 LTC campuses across the state.

Northwestern State University (NSU), is a four-year public university primarily situated in Natchitoches, Louisiana and is part of the University of Louisiana System. The NSU-Leesville/Fort Polk Campus is located on Highway 467 near Fort Polk. It serves the civilian communities of Vernon, Beauregard, and Sabine parishes, as well as the military community at Fort Polk. http://leesville.nsula.edu/

The Fort Polk Education Center offers self-development opportunities for Service members, military family members, Department of the Defense employees, military Retirees, Department of Defense contractors, and civilians from the local community in the classroom, distance learning, and online environments. Civilian students coming to the post for classes are required to use the main entrance located off U.S. Highway 171.

Central Michigan University (CMU) operates a campus at Fort Polk.

Central Texas College (CTC) is a public, open-admission community college offering associate degrees and certificate programs in academic, professional and vocational/technical fields. Due to its proximity to Fort Polk, CTC has evolved from a small junior college into a college catering to the military. CTC also help students transition from a 2-year to a 4-year degree through numerous articulation agreements with 4-year institutions nationwide.

Louisiana State University offers a Master of Arts in Liberal Arts.

The Upper Iowa University (UIU) at Fort Polk offers classes on post to both military personnel and civilians in the area. It was opened in 1995 and offers bachelor's degrees in nine majors. Courses can also be blended with UIU distance learning programs (online and independent study) to complete 11 other majors. Certificate programs are also available. UIU offers courses on post during five eight-week terms during the academic year. All courses are offered during the evenings and on weekends.

=== Public libraries ===
The Vernon Parish Library operates public libraries. It operates the main library and the Dunbar Branch Library in Leesville and the Pitkin Branch Library in Pitkin.

== National Guard ==
The Louisiana Army National Guard maintains a maintenance facility which services its vehicles on Fort Polk. 3-156 IB part of 256th Tiger Brigade is located at Fort Polk.

== Communities ==
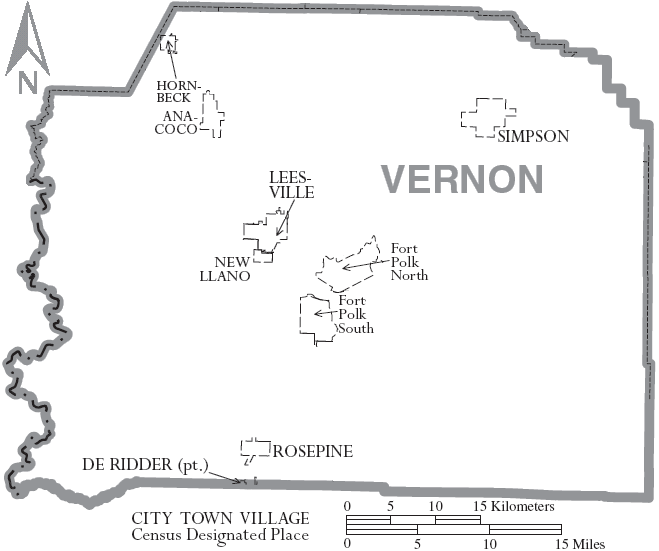
Map of Vernon Parish Fort Polk)

=== Cities ===
- DeRidder (most of DeRidder is in Beauregard Parish, with a very small portion reaching into Vernon)
- Leesville (parish seat and largest municipality)

=== Towns ===
- Hornbeck
- New Llano
- Rosepine

=== Villages ===
- Anacoco
- Simpson

=== Unincorporated areas ===
==== Census-designated places ====
- Fort Polk North (Note: Fort Polk North is actually a military community contained within Fort Polk Army Installation.)
- Fort Polk South (Note: Fort Polk South is actually a military community contained within Fort Polk Army Installation.)
- Pitkin

==== Other communities ====
- Burr Ferry
- Caney
- Coopers
- Cravens
- Evans
- Fullerton
- Hawthorne
- Hicks
- Hutton
- Kurthwood
- Lacamp
- Leander
- Pickering
- Sandy Hill
- Slagle
- Standard
- Temple

== Notable people ==
- Bert A. Adams, state representative from Vernon Parish from 1956 to 1968
- Eddie Fuller, running back for the Buffalo Bills
- Frank A. Howard, former Vernon Parish sheriff and Republican member of the Louisiana House of Representatives
- Buddy Leach, former member of the United States House of Representatives, Louisiana House of Representatives, and Louisiana Democratic Party chairman
- Kevin Mawae, All-Pro center for the Tennessee Titans
- Demond Mallet, professional basketball player in the German League and with Joventut Badalona
- Jim McCrery, former U.S. Representative for Louisiana's 4th congressional district
- Charles M. Poston Sr., member of the Louisiana State Senate from 1960 to 1964
- Bryan A. Poston, member of the Louisiana State Senate from 1964 to 1992
- Jewel Prestage, first African-American woman to earn a PhD in political science, former Dean of the School of Public Policy and Urban Affairs at Southern University
- D'Anthony Smith, nose tackle for the Chicago Bears

== Politics ==
United States presidential election results for Vernon Parish, Louisiana
Year	Republican		Democratic		Third party(ies)	
Year	No.	%	No.	%	No.	%
1916	44	3.45%	754	59.09%	478	37.46%
1920	205	15.21%	1,143	84.79%	0	0.00%
1924	142	9.18%	1,372	88.69%	33	2.13%
1928	500	18.58%	2,191	81.42%	0	0.00%
1932	46	1.55%	2,868	96.60%	55	1.85%
1936	928	24.65%	2,831	75.21%	5	0.13%
1940	311	8.29%	3,439	91.71%	0	0.00%
1944	1,022	24.95%	3,075	75.05%	0	0.00%
1948	296	6.46%	1,939	42.32%	2,347	51.22%
1952	2,130	35.73%	3,832	64.27%	0	0.00%
1956	2,372	49.81%	2,158	45.32%	232	4.87%
1960	1,991	32.32%	3,145	51.06%	1,024	16.62%
1964	3,696	50.91%	3,564	49.09%	0	0.00%
1968	1,574	18.29%	1,496	17.38%	5,536	64.33%
1972	6,225	77.62%	1,345	16.77%	450	5.61%
1976	3,970	37.94%	6,202	59.26%	293	2.80%
1980	5,869	43.68%	7,198	53.57%	369	2.75%
1984	9,035	67.58%	4,076	30.49%	258	1.93%
1988	7,453	58.40%	4,998	39.17%	310	2.43%
1992	5,912	40.04%	6,005	40.66%	2,850	19.30%
1996	5,449	39.02%	6,195	44.36%	2,322	16.63%
2000	8,794	63.60%	4,655	33.67%	378	2.73%
2004	11,032	72.44%	4,035	26.50%	162	1.06%
2008	11,946	75.76%	3,534	22.41%	289	1.83%
2012	12,150	77.83%	3,173	20.33%	287	1.84%
2016	13,471	80.99%	2,665	16.02%	497	2.99%
2020	14,107	81.69%	2,898	16.78%	263	1.52%
2024	13,474	83.44%	2,513	15.56%	162	1.00%

== See also ==
- National Register of Historic Places listings in Vernon Parish, Louisiana
