= Vernon Parish School Board =

School district in Louisiana, United States

Coordinates: 31.1522°N 93.2614°W

Vernon Parish School Board is a school district headquartered in Leesville, Louisiana, United States.

The district serves all of Vernon Parish. Additionally, military families associated with Fort Johnson, on and off post, may choose the Vernon Parish school district as an option for grades 5-12.

== School uniforms ==
Some schools' students are required to wear school uniforms.

== Schools ==
=== PK-12 schools ===
- Evans High School (Unincorporated area)
- Hicks High School (Unincorporated area)
- Hornbeck High School (Hornbeck)
- Pitkin High School (Unincorporated area, Pitkin)
- Simpson High School (Simpson)

=== 9-12 schools ===
- Leesville High School (Leesville)

=== 7-12 schools ===
Zoned

- Anacoco High School (Anacoco)
- Pickering High School (Unincorporated area)
- Rosepine Junior/Senior High School (Rosepine)

Alternative

- Vernon Parish Optional School (Leesville)

=== 7-8 schools ===
- Leesville Junior High School (Leesville)

=== PK-6 schools ===
- Anacoco Elementary School (Anacoco)
- Pickering Elementary School (Unincorporated area)
- Rosepine Elementary School (Rosepine)

=== 5-6 schools ===
- Vernon Middle School (Leesville)

=== 2-4 schools ===
- South Polk Elementary School (Fort Johnson)
- West Leesville Elementary School (Leesville)

=== PK-1 schools ===
- East Leesville Elementary School (Leesville)
- North Elementary School (Fort Johnson)
