= Evans High School =

Evans High School may refer to:

- Evans High School (Georgia), Evans, Georgia
- Evans High School (Louisiana), Vernon Parish, Louisiana
- Evans High School (New South Wales), Blacktown, New South Wales
- Maynard Evans High School, Orlando, Florida
