= Ethan Frey =

American baseball player (born 2004)

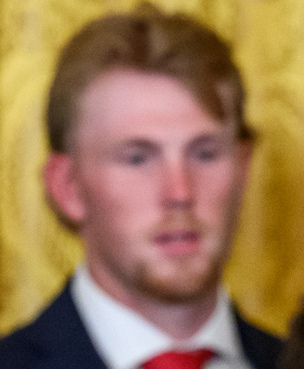
- Frey in 2025

Houston Astros
- Outfielder / First baseman
- Born: March 15, 2004 (age 22); Rosepine, Louisiana, U.S.
- Bats: Right Throws: Right
- Stats at Baseball Reference

Ethan Taylor Frey (born March 15, 2004) is an American professional baseball outfielder in the Houston Astros organization. The Astros selected with the ninety-fifth overall pick in the 2025 MLB draft.

== Career ==
Frey attended Rosepine High School in Rosepine, Louisiana. During his high school career he batted .487 as a senior at Rosepine High with 13 homers, 64 RBI, 39 hits, 37 walks and only 12 strikeouts, posting a .487 on-base percentage and a 1.188 slugging percentage. He won The Louisiana Farm Bureau Insurance/LSWA Mr. Baseball award in 2022. Frey helped lead Rosepine to back-to-back state championships and also played quarterback for the Rosepine High football team. He was ranked the 230th player and 12th best catcher in the country by Perfect Game in the Class of 2022, while also being the 2nd overall player and first overall catcher in the state of Louisiana. After having a successful prep career in Louisiana, Frey committed to Louisiana State University (LSU) to play college baseball.

In the 2025 season, Frey batted .331 on the season as the Tigers’ primary designated hitter with 15 doubles, 1 triple, 13 homers, 50 RBI and 43 runs in 62 games. He scored a team-high six runs in the 2025 College World Series, posting a .391 on-base percentage in the CWS that included two doubles and four walks. Frey was also voted to the NCAA Baton Rouge Regional All-Tournament Team.

Frey delivered an RBI double for LSU’s first run in Game 2 of the College World Series Finals versus Coastal Carolina, as the Tigers went on to a 5-3 victory to claim the NCAA Men's Baseball College World Series.

Frey signed a $997 thousand dollar signing bonus with the Houston Astros.
