= List of schools in Lafayette Parish, Louisiana =

== Secondary schools ==
=== High schools ===
- Acadiana High School
- Carencro High School
- Ovey Comeaux High School
- Lafayette High School
- Northside High School
- Southside High School
- Early College Academy

== Private schools ==
- Ascension Episcopal School
- Episcopal School of Acadiana
- John Paul The Great Academy
- Lafayette Christian Academy
- St. Thomas More Catholic High School
- Teurlings Catholic High School
- Westminster Christian Academy
