= Anacoco High School =

Public secondary school in Anacoco, Louisiana, United States

Location
- 4740 Port Arthur Avenue; Anacoco, (Vernon Parish), Louisiana 71403; United States; 31.2520°N 93.3385°W

Information
- Type: Public high school
- School district: Vernon Parish School Board
- Principal: Whitney Mawae
- Staff: 25.94 (FTE)
- Enrollment: 318 (2023-2024)
- Student to teacher ratio: 12.26
- Colors: Purple and gold
- Athletics conference: District 4-B
- Nickname: Indians
- Accreditation: Blue Ribbon 2016
- Yearbook: The Chief

Anacoco High School, a 2016 Blue Ribbon School is a grade 7-12 middle/high school in Anacoco, Louisiana, a village in Vernon Parish, Louisiana. It is governed by the Vernon Parish School Board.

== Academics ==
In 2008, Anacoco High School was among 39 Louisiana high schools recognized by U.S. News & World Report as the country's Best High Schools, receiving a bronze medal ranking.

In 2016, Anacoco High School was one of seven Louisiana schools to be recognized by the United States Department of Education as a Blue Ribbon School, having been labeled an "A" school since 1999.

== Athletics ==
The Anacoco Indians compete in Class B of the Louisiana High School Athletics Association.

=== State Championships ===
Boys Basketball

- (2) 2015, 2016

Girls Basketball

- (9) 1967, 1985, 1995, 1997, 1998, 1999, 2000, 2001, 2002

Softball

- (1) 2012
