= Pitkin, Louisiana =

- CDP
- Location in Vernon Parish and the state of Louisiana.
- Coordinates: 30°56′04″N 92°55′36″W
- Country: United States
- State: Louisiana
- Parish: Vernon

Area
  - Total: 6.24 sq mi (16.16 km^{2})
  - Land: 6.23 sq mi (16.13 km^{2})
  - Water: 0.012 sq mi (0.03 km^{2})
- Elevation: 161 ft (49 m)

Population (2020)
  - Total: 455
  - Density: 73/sq mi (28.2/km^{2})
- Time zone: UTC-6 (Central (CST))
  - Summer (DST): UTC-5 (CDT)
- Area code: 337
- GNIS feature ID: 2586699

Pitkin is a census-designated place (CDP) in Vernon Parish, Louisiana, United States.

Pitkin is approximately 40 miles (64 km) southeast of Leesville, the parish seat, and approximately 45 miles (72 km) southwest of the city of Alexandria. As of the 2020 census, Pitkin had a population of 455.

Burl Cain, former warden of the Louisiana State Penitentiary at Angola and commissioner of the Mississippi Department of Corrections, was reared in Pitkin. His older brother, James David, a former member of both houses of the Louisiana State Legislature, was born in Pitkin in 1938.

== History ==
In 1863, during the Civil War, Confederate soldiers built a military road from Niblett's Bluff to Alexandria that passed through the area. The Vernon Parish Tourism Commission placed an historical marker in 2009.

American sociologist, historian, and author James W. Loewen, in his 2005 book Sundown Towns: A Hidden Dimension of American Racism, identified Pitkin as having been a sundown town.

== Demographics ==
Historical population
| Census | Pop. | Note | %± |
|---|---|---|---|
| 2010 | 576 | | — |
| 2020 | 455 | | −21.0% |
U.S. Decennial Census

Pitkin first appeared as a census designated place in the 2010 U.S. census. '

=== Racial and ethnic composition ===
Pitkin CDP, Louisiana – Racial and ethnic composition Note: the US Census treats Hispanic/Latino as an ethnic category. This table excludes Latinos from the racial categories and assigns them to a separate category. Hispanics/Latinos may be of any race.
| Race / Ethnicity (NH = Non-Hispanic) | Pop 2010 | Pop 2020 | % 2010 | % 2020 |
|---|---|---|---|---|
| White alone (NH) | 533 | 398 | 92.53% | 87.47% |
| Black or African American alone (NH) | 1 | 4 | 0.17% | 0.88% |
| Native American or Alaska Native alone (NH) | 19 | 10 | 3.30% | 2.20% |
| Asian alone (NH) | 3 | 0 | 0.52% | 0.00% |
| Native Hawaiian or Pacific Islander alone (NH) | 0 | 0 | 0.00% | 0.00% |
| Other race alone (NH) | 0 | 5 | 0.00% | 1.10% |
| Mixed race or Multiracial (NH) | 10 | 22 | 1.74% | 4.84% |
| Hispanic or Latino (any race) | 10 | 16 | 1.74% | 3.52% |
| Total | 576 | 455 | 100.00% | 100.00% |

=== 2010 census ===
According to the 2010 census, of its 576 population who live in 230 households, their median age was 41.6, 541 are White, 10 are multiracial, 3 are Asian, 2 are some other race, 1 is African American; 10 have Latino ethnicity.

== Education ==
The Vernon Parish School District serves Pitkin. It operates Pitkin High School (PK-12). The Vernon Parish Library operates the Pitkin Branch Library.
