= Hicks, Louisiana =

Unincorporated community in Louisiana, U.S.

Coordinates: 31°11′06″N 93°00′58″W

Hicks is an unincorporated community in Vernon Parish, Louisiana, United States.

A post office called Hicks was established in 1887 and remained in operation until it was discontinued in 1992.

Hicks High School enrolls nearly four hundred pupils.

The Hicks Pentecostal Church Cemetery located in the community. It is the resting place of 30th Judicial District Court Judge Jim Mitchell.
