= Hornbeck, Louisiana =

- Town
- Motto: "Gateway to Toledo Bend"
- Location of Hornbeck in Vernon Parish, Louisiana.

- Location of Louisiana in the United States
- Coordinates: 31°19′36″N 93°23′46″W
- Country: United States
- State: Louisiana
- Parish: Vernon
- Founded: October 21, 1902

Government
  - Type: Mayor-Council

Area
  - Total: 1.15 sq mi (2.99 km^{2})
  - Land: 1.15 sq mi (2.98 km^{2})
  - Water: 0.0039 sq mi (0.01 km^{2})
- Elevation: 371 ft (113 m)

Population (2020)
  - Total: 430
  - Density: 373.6/sq mi (144.25/km^{2})
- Time zone: UTC-6 (CST)
  - Summer (DST): UTC-5 (CDT)
- Postal code: 71439
- Area code: 318
- FIPS code: 22-36045
- GNIS feature ID: 2405864
- Website: Town of Hornbeck, Louisiana

Hornbeck is a town in Vernon Parish, Louisiana, United States. As of the 2020 census, Hornbeck had a population of 430. It is part of the Fort Johnson South Micropolitan Statistical Area.

== History ==
As early as the 1830s people settled in the area now known as Hornbeck, but a town didn't begin to form until 1897, when an agent for the Arkansas Town Site Company named F.A. Hornbeck purchased land along the Kansas City Southern Railroad (KCS) for $8,640. Structures necessary for servicing locomotives were constructed as well as a brick kiln to supply bricks for construction.

In 1897, the first Post Office opened in the area with Walter Carey as the first postmaster and later that same year he was succeeded by D.B. Pate.

The first public school in Hornbeck opened in 1898, with Miss Fannie Monk and W.L. Ford serving as the primary and grammar school teachers. The first secondary school opened in 1907 with G.S. Graybeal serving as its principal, then in 1910 the school became an affiliated high school.

On October 21, 1902, Governor William Wright Heard issued a proclamation declaring that Section 16, Township 4, North Range 10 West was incorporated as Hornbeck; with W.M. Conerly appointed mayor and G.G. Leach, W.L. Maddox and John Carter appointed aldermen; W. Johnson became the town marshal.

Kansas City Southern Railroad established a presence in Hornbeck with the construction of the roundhouse, which allowed for the servicing of engines. The presence of the roundhouse contributed to making Hornbeck a significant junction between Port Arthur, Texas and Shreveport as well as providing an abundance of jobs and influencing the town's growth. The early twentieth century was a prosperous time for Hornbeck with both the timber and railroad industries having an established presence in the area. Hornbeck became a bustling little town, with a bank, a newspaper, five hotels, five saloons and ten retail stores.

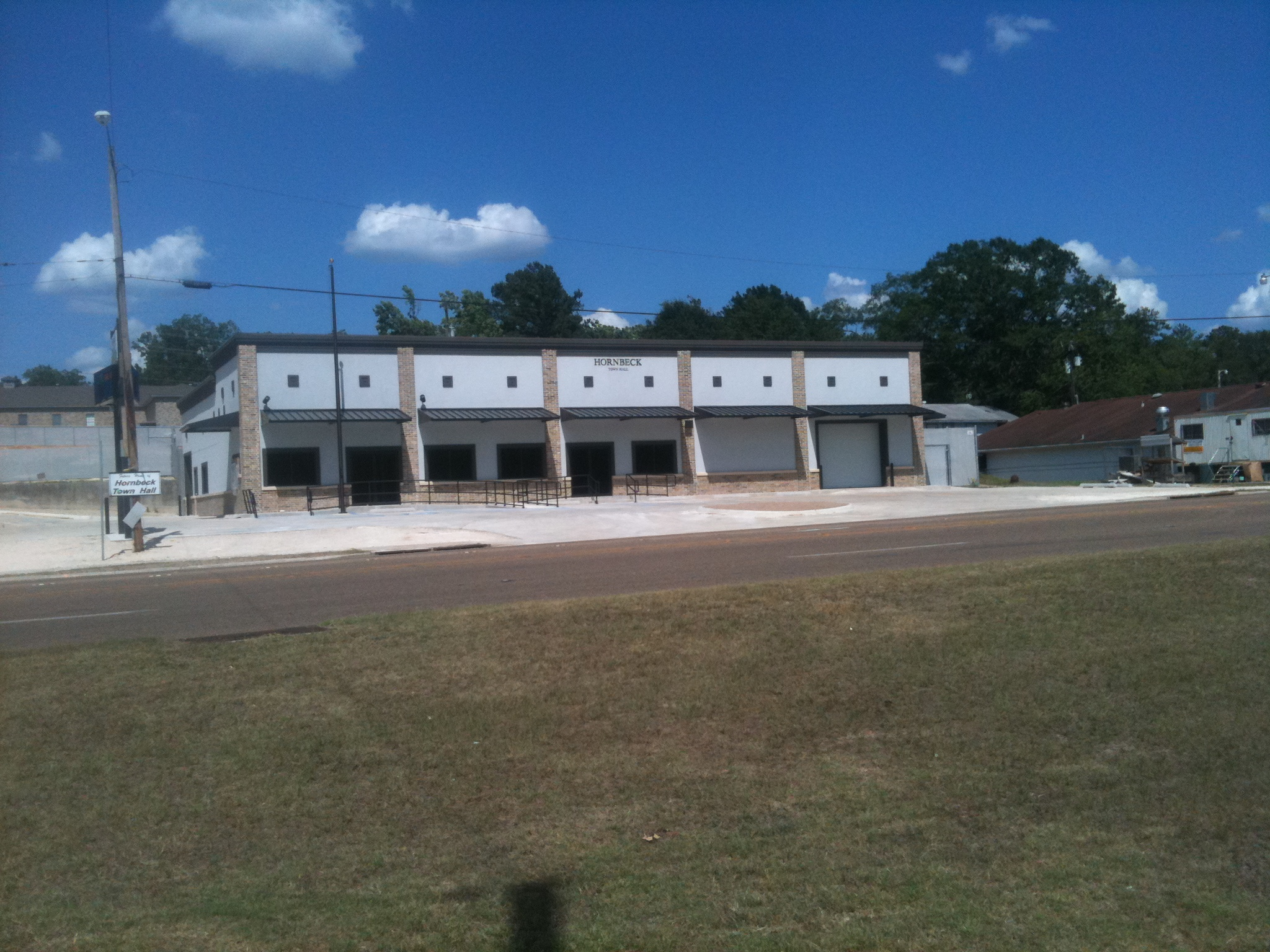
The New Town Hall in Hornbeck, LA in June 2011

In 1912, KCS decided to move the roundhouse to Leesville; this decision was disastrous for Hornbeck's economy, with the town surviving on the timber, turpentine and farming industries for nearly two more decades. However, when the Great Depression hit in late 1929 it caused the timber and turpentine industries to collapse and brought an abrupt end to Hornbeck's prosperity.

In the 1940s the Department of War established Camp Polk and conducted what became known as the “Louisiana Maneuvers.” The location of Camp Polk in Vernon Parish helped to stimulate Hornbeck's economy as well as that of the entire region, especially Vernon Parish.

In the 1960s, with the construction of Toledo Bend Reservoir on the Sabine River, Hornbeck gained an asset and started promoting itself as the “Gateway” to Toledo Bend.

Today, Hornbeck has maintained modest growth, with its elected officials taking a pro-active approach to economic development. On October 21, 2002, Hornbeck celebrated its 100th anniversary.

== Geography ==
According to the United States Census Bureau, the town has a total area of 1.2 square miles (3.1 km^{2}), all land.

== Demographics ==
Historical population
Census	Pop.	Note	%±
1910	459		—
1920	350		−23.7%
1930	491		40.3%
1940	481		−2.0%
1950	524		8.9%
1960	374		−28.6%
1970	525		40.4%
1980	470		−10.5%
1990	427		−9.1%
2000	435		1.9%
2010	480		10.3%
2020	430		−10.4%
2025 (est.)	398	▼	−7.4%
U.S. Decennial Census

As of the census of 2000, there were 435 people, 181 households, and 121 families residing in the town. The population density was 372.9 inhabitants per square mile (144.0/km^{2}). There were 227 housing units at an average density of 194.6 per square mile (75.1/km^{2}). The racial makeup of the town was 94.02% White, 2.30% African American, 2.07% Native American, 0.23% Pacific Islander, 0.23% from other races, and 1.15% from two or more races. Hispanic or Latino of any race were 0.69% of the population.

There were 181 households, out of which 28.7% had children under the age of 18 living with them, 54.7% were married couples living together, 10.5% had a female householder with no husband present, and 32.6% were non-families. 31.5% of all households were made up of individuals, and 15.5% had someone living alone who was 65 years of age or older. The average household size was 2.40 and the average family size was 3.03.

In the town, the population was spread out, with 25.1% under the age of 18, 10.6% from 18 to 24, 27.4% from 25 to 44, 21.6% from 45 to 64, and 15.4% who were 65 years of age or older. The median age was 36 years. For every 100 females, there were 80.5 males. For every 100 females age 18 and over, there were 82.1 males.

The median income for a household in the town was $25,446, and the median income for a family was $33,036. Males had a median income of $27,750 versus $17,000 for females. The per capita income for the town was $11,237. About 13.2% of families and 14.3% of the population were below the poverty line, including 10.7% of those under age 18 and 29.9% of those age 65 or over.

== Government ==
Founded in 1897 and incorporated in 1902, Hornbeck is the northernmost community in Vernon Parish. The first town government was appointed by Governor William Wright Heard in 1902 and consisted of a Mayor, 3 Aldermen and a Town Marshal. Today Hornbeck's government (mayor-council system) consists of a Mayor, four councilmen and one councilwoman and a Chief of Police.

Under the mayor-council government, the mayor serves as the executive officer of the town. As the town's chief administrator and official representative, the mayor is responsible for the general management of the town and for seeing that all laws and ordinances are enforced via the Chief of Police.

== Education ==
Hornbeck is a part of the Vernon Parish School District headquartered in Leesville and has been home to Hornbeck High School, the only public school in the community, since 1898. In 1910, Hornbeck High School became an affiliated high school, although on the school's crest it bears the date 1913.

== Notable people ==
- Bryan A. Poston, a Hornbeck businessman, was a member of the Louisiana State Senate from 1964 to 1992. He succeeded his father, Charles M. Poston Sr., who held the same seat from 1960 to 1964. Both were Democrats.
- Frank A. Howard, a former Vernon Parish Sheriff, has been representing the 24th district in the Louisiana House of Representatives since his election in 2007.
- William H. West was a member of the Louisiana House of Representatives from 1978 to 1984.

== Gallery ==
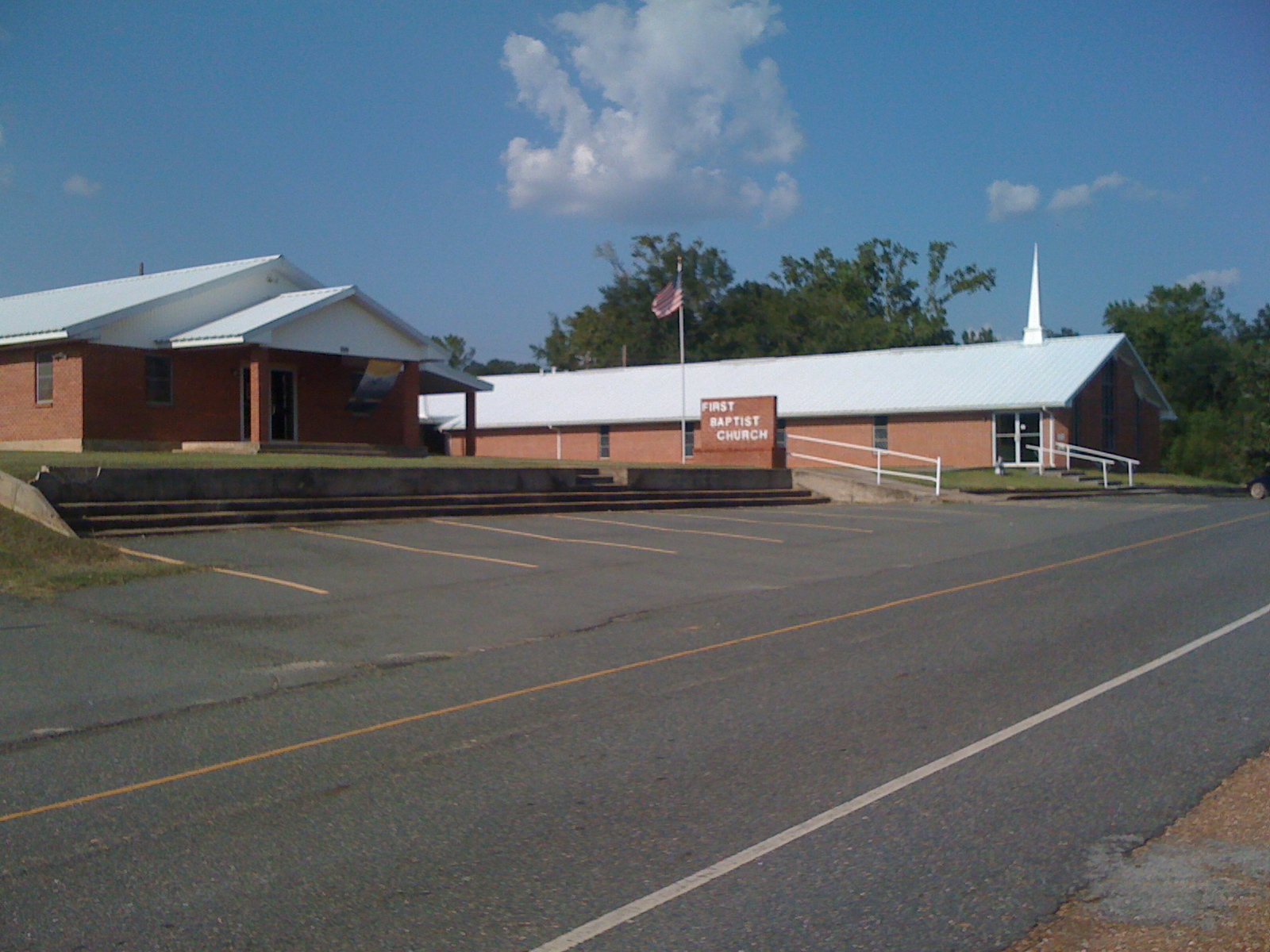
Hornbeck First Baptist Church 2010

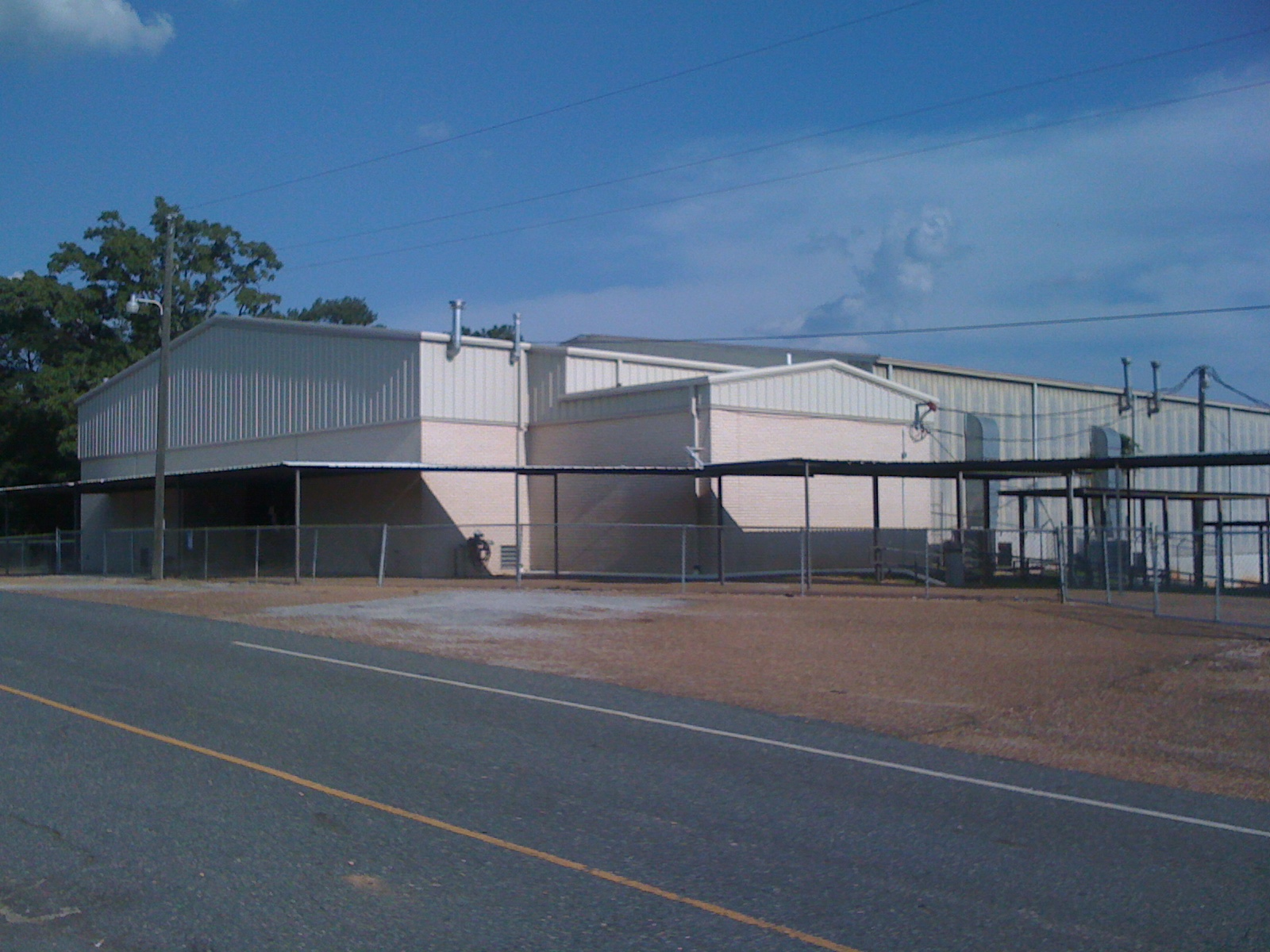
The HHS New Gym 2010

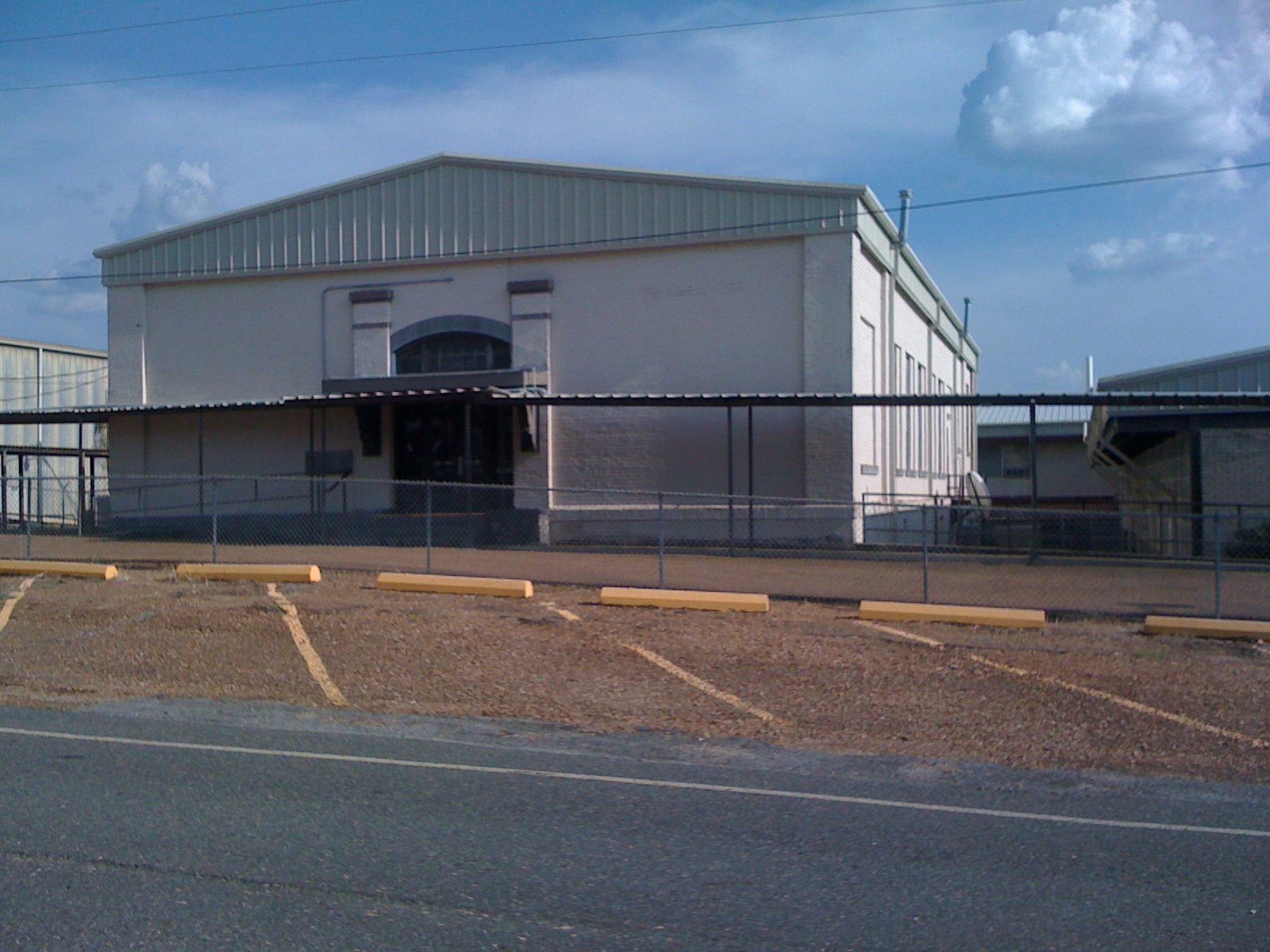
The HHS Auditorium 2010

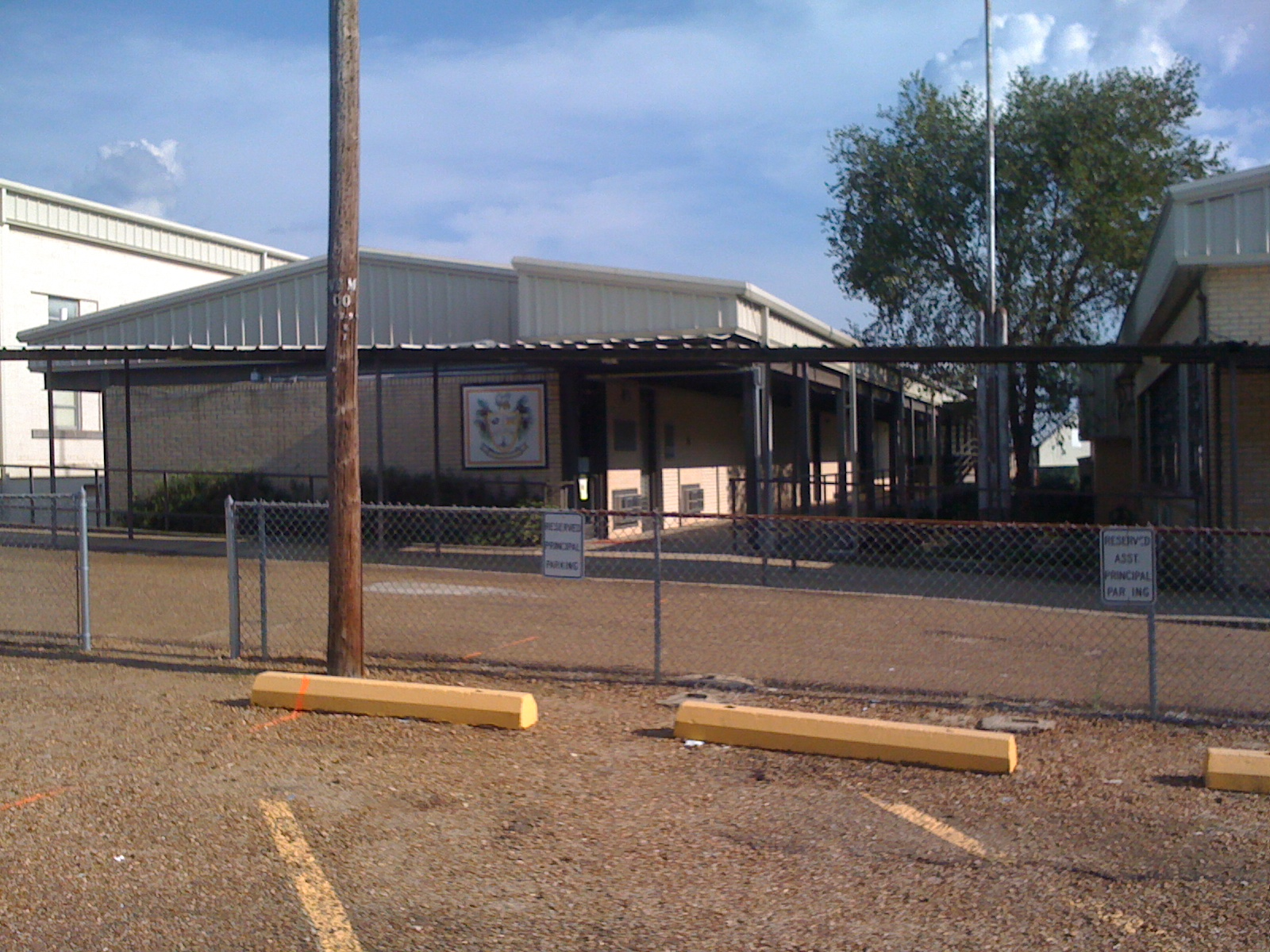
The Hornbeck High School 2010

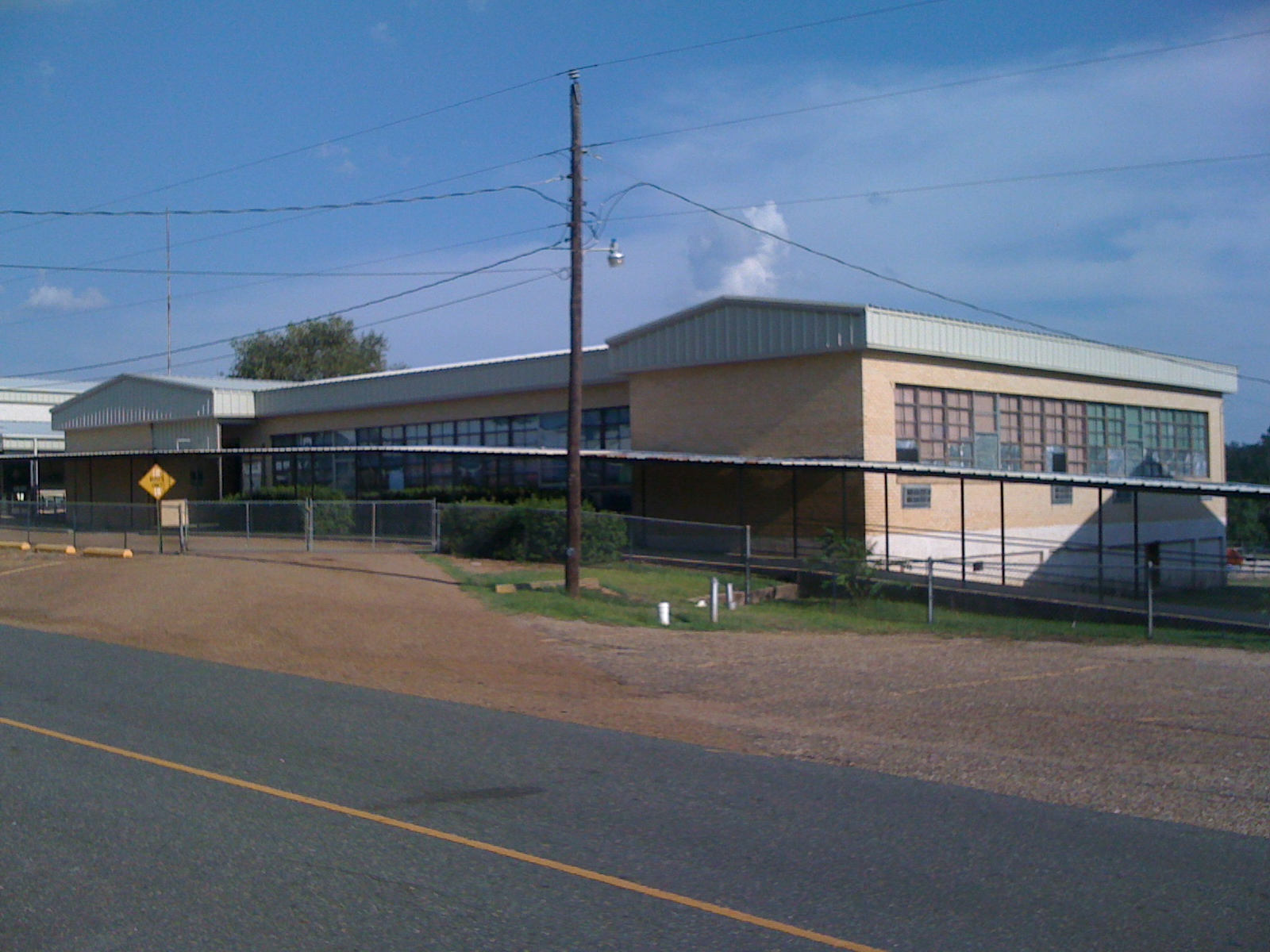
The HHS Elementary School 2010

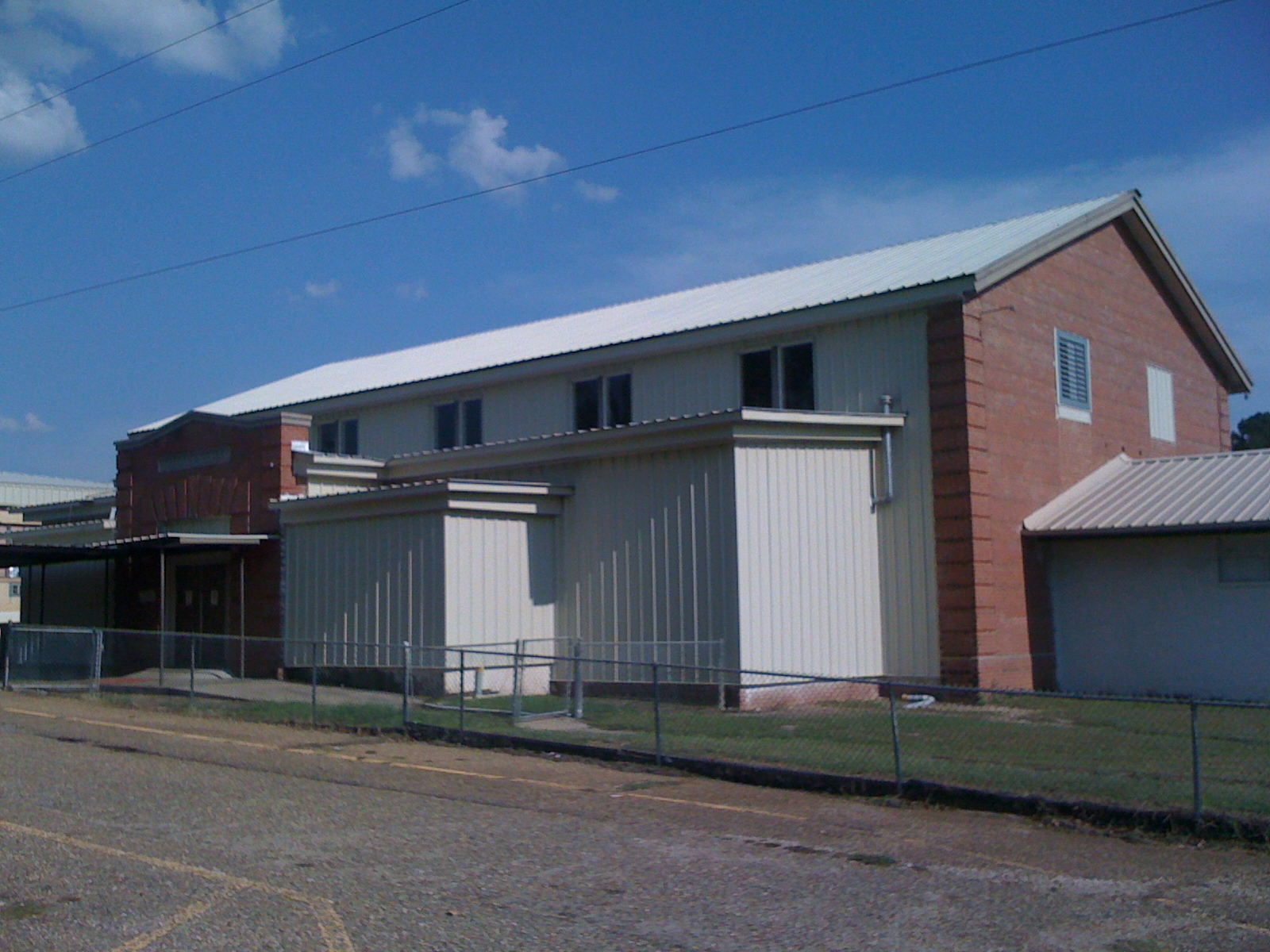
The HHS Old Gym 2010
