= Mentorship Academy of Digital Arts =

Helix Mentorship STEAM Academy

Location
- 339 Florida Street; Baton Rouge, (East Baton Rouge Parish), Louisiana 70801; United States; 30.4496°N 91.1873°W

Information
- Type: Public high school
- Established: 2011
- School district: East Baton Rouge Parish School Board
- Principal: Angela Domingue
- Staff: 38.13 (FTE)
- Enrollment: 522 (2023-2024)
- Student to teacher ratio: 13.69
- Colors: Navy blue and green
- Mascot: Sharks

Helix Mentorship STEAM Academy or Mentorship Academy, located in Baton Rouge, Louisiana, is a charter high school in the East Baton Rouge Parish.

== History ==
Mentorship Academy opened in 2011 after the East Baton Rouge Parish School Board approved its charter in 2010. In March 2017, the school's charter was renewed through 2023.

== Location ==
Mentorship Academy is located in downtown Baton Rouge, in a six-story building that once housed a bank.

== Athletics ==
Mentorship Academy athletics competes in the LHSAA.
