= Pitkin High School =

Location
- 7239 Highway 463; Pitkin, (Vernon Parish), Louisiana 70656; United States; 30.9368°N 92.9336°W

Information
- Type: Public high school
- School district: Vernon Parish School Board
- Principal: Connie Britt
- Teaching staff: 35.47 (FTE)
- Grades: PK–12
- Enrollment: 431 (2023–2024)
- Student to teacher ratio: 12.15
- Colors: Blue and white
- Mascot: Tiger
- Nickname: Tigers
- Website: pit.vpsb.us

Pitkin High School (PHS) is a PK-12 school in the Pitkin community, an unincorporated area of Vernon Parish, Louisiana, United States. It is controlled by the Vernon Parish School Board.

== History ==
Prior to the establishment of the school, several one and two room schoolhouses in the area educated children. They were later combined into a school called Compromise. Pitkin High was first established as a brick building facility in 1915, and it was approved as a high school on August 23, 1915. The current school building opened in 1969 and since then received renovations and additions.

== Facility ==
The school has three wings, one for lower elementary (Pre-K and head start through 4th grade), upper elementary (grades 5–8), and high school (9–12).

== Athletics ==
Pitkin High athletics competes in the LHSAA.

== Notable alumni ==
- James David Cain (Class of 1956), former member of both houses of the Louisiana State Legislature
