= D'Anthony Smith =

American football player (born 1988)

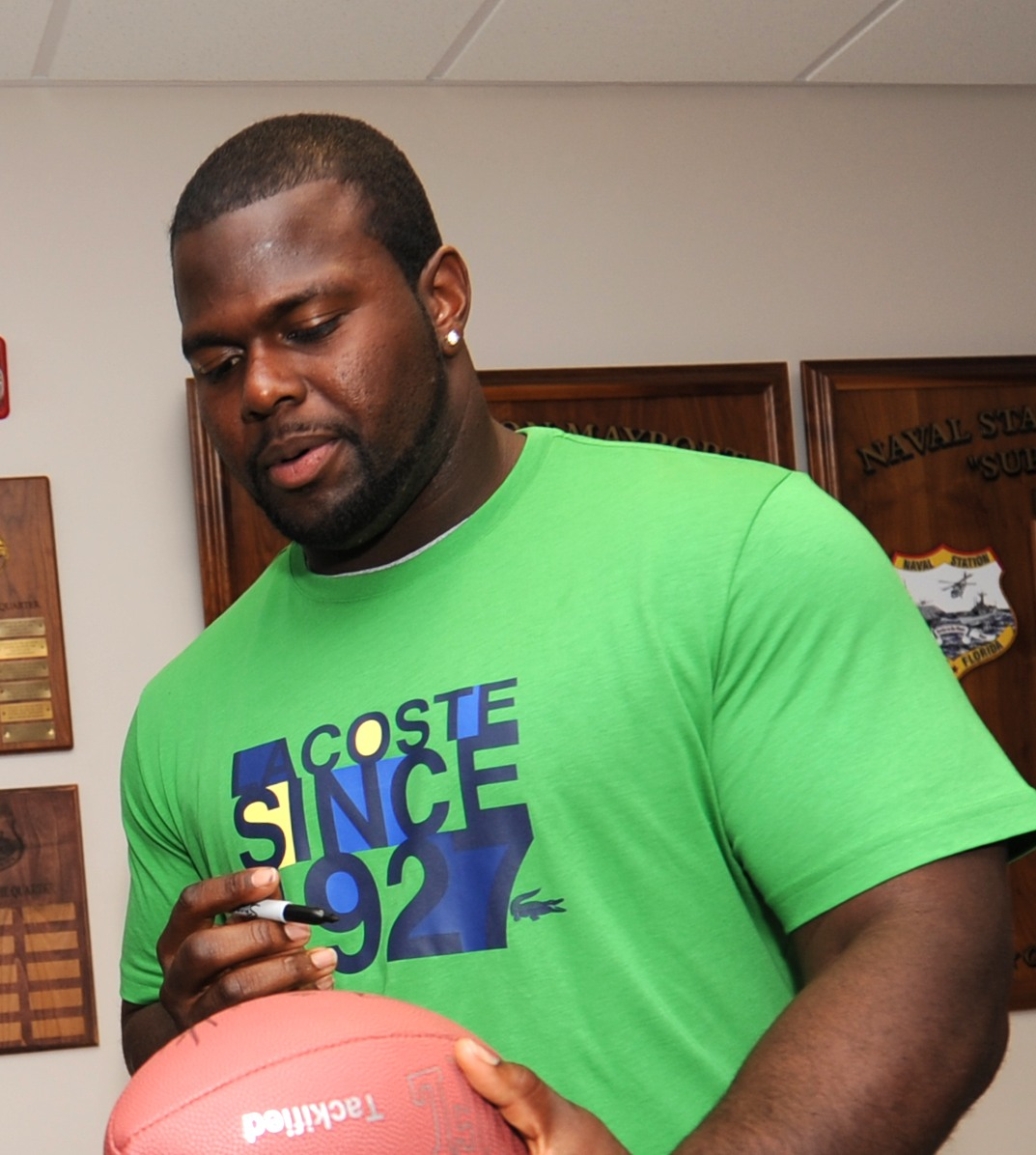
- Smith signing an autograph in 2012

No. 94, 95, 70
- Position: Nose tackle

Personal information
- Born: June 9, 1988 (age 38); West Berlin, Germany
- Listed height: 6 ft 2 in (1.88 m)
- Listed weight: 300 lb (136 kg)

Career information
- High school: Leesville (LA) Pickering
- College: Louisiana Tech
- NFL draft: 2010: 3rd round, 74th overall pick

Career history
- Jacksonville Jaguars (2010–2012); Seattle Seahawks (2013); Detroit Lions (2013); Seattle Seahawks (2013–2014); Chicago Bears (2015)

Awards and highlights
- Super Bowl champion (XLVIII); First-team All-WAC (2008)

Career NFL statistics
- Total tackles: 15
- Stats at Pro Football Reference

D'Anthony Smith (born June 9, 1988) is an American former professional football player who was a nose tackle and Super Bowl XLVIII champion with the Seattle Seahawks of the National Football League (NFL). He was selected by the Jacksonville Jaguars in the third round of the 2010 NFL draft. He played college football for the Louisiana Tech Bulldogs after receiving a Division I athletic scholarship.

== Early life ==
Smith was born in Berlin, Germany, but eventually moved to Fort Polk, Louisiana. At Pickering High School, Smith competed in three sports, football, basketball and shot put. He started all four years at the school, and every year but one, he received an award for his play on the defensive line. As a senior, he had 80 tackles and three sacks.

== College career ==
In his collegiate debut as a true freshman in 2006, Smith intercepted a pass that was deflected by another player against Nebraska. Smith overall, started eight games and came off the bench in five for the Bulldogs and had 38 tackles. His career high in tackles came against North Texas when he had seven, he also had five against Fresno State.

Against Fresno State as a sophomore in 2007, Smith equaled his total from the season before with five tackles, but also added a sack on their quarterback Tom Brandstater. For the season, he started 11 games and missed one due to injury and had 42 tackles and three sacks. Smith tied his career high in tackles with seven against Central Arkansas.

Against San Jose State in 2008, Smith had seven tackles and one sack. Heading into the Independence Bowl against Northern Illinois, he led the team with five sacks and was third with 65 tackles. He was named as a member of the First-team All-WAC following the regular season. For the season, he had nine tackles on two occasions and was named All-Louisiana. He started every one of the Bulldogs's 13 games.

In 2009, Smith was listed at No. 11 on Rivals.com′s preseason defensive tackle power ranking. He was also named to the 2009 Outland Trophy watch list.

== Professional career ==
=== Jacksonville Jaguars ===
Smith was selected by the Jacksonville Jaguars in the third round (74th overall) of the 2010 NFL draft. He spent his first two NFL seasons on injured reserve.

He registered his first career tackle in the Jaguars' 2012 season opener against the Minnesota Vikings. He was placed on injured reserve on November 28, 2012.

=== Seattle Seahawks (first stint) ===
The Jaguars announced that Smith was one of their final preseason cuts on August 30, 2013. However, before the team had officially submitted their cuts, Smith was traded to the Seattle Seahawks on August 31 for a conditional draft pick. He was released by the Seahawks on September 24, 2013.

=== Detroit Lions ===
The Lions claimed Smith off waivers on September 25, 2013, and released him on October 2.

=== Seattle Seahawks (second stint) ===
Smith was re-signed by the Seahawks to their practice squad on October 5, 2013. Smith re-signed with Seattle on March 19, 2015. On August 31, 2015, Smith was cut by the Seahawks during the preseason.

=== Chicago Bears ===
On October 13, 2015, the Chicago Bears signed Smith to their practice squad. He was promoted to the active roster on December 22. On May 2, 2016, the Bears released Smith.

== Post-football career ==
After retiring from the NFL, Dr. Smith earned credentials as an Associate Certified Coach (ACC) and Certified Mental Performance Consultant (CMPC). He completed a Doctorate of Education in Clinical Mental Health Counseling with Specialization in Sport & Performance Psychology (2020). Smith completed his dissertation entitled: The Autonomous Response & Its Impact on Performance Expectancy In Athletes, at the University of Western States, Portland, Oregon. He is a member of the National Football Association, the Association for Applied Sport Psychology, the National Strength and Conditioning Society, the International Coach Federation, and the American Counseling Association. As a self-employed founder and Licensed Clinical Sports Counselor, Dr. Smith provides sports counseling, mental performance training, and sports life coaching.
