= Rosepine High School =

Public high school in Vernon Parish, Louisiana

Rosepine Jr-Sr High School

Location
- 502 Louisiana Avenue; Rosepine, Louisiana 70659; United States
- 30°55′38″N 93°17′10″W

Information
- School type: Public, high school
- Motto: Unity, Pride, Excellence
- Established: September 1958; 67 years ago
- Status: Active
- School district: Vernon Parish School Board
- Principal: Joseph Bartz
- Teaching staff: 30.53 (FTE)
- Grades: 7–12
- Enrollment: 577 (2023–2024)
- Student to teacher ratio: 18.90
- Colors: Purple, Black & White
- Mascot: Ernie the Eagle
- Nickname: Eagles
- Accreditation: Blue Ribbon 2014
- Website: Official Website

Rosepine High School is a public high school serving Rosepine, Louisiana, United States. It is part of the Vernon Parish School Board.

== History ==
Rosepine Jr/Sr High School, along with all public schools in the state, receives a letter grade that reflects the school's performance. Since the 2011-2012 school year, Rosepine has achieved and maintained an "A" grade.

== Athletics ==
Rosepine High athletics compete in the LHSAA.

=== State Championships ===
Baseball

- (2) 2021, 2022

Girls Basketball

- (1) 2023

== Awards and recognition ==
In 2014, Rosepine was recognized as a Blue Ribbon school by Betsy DeVos.

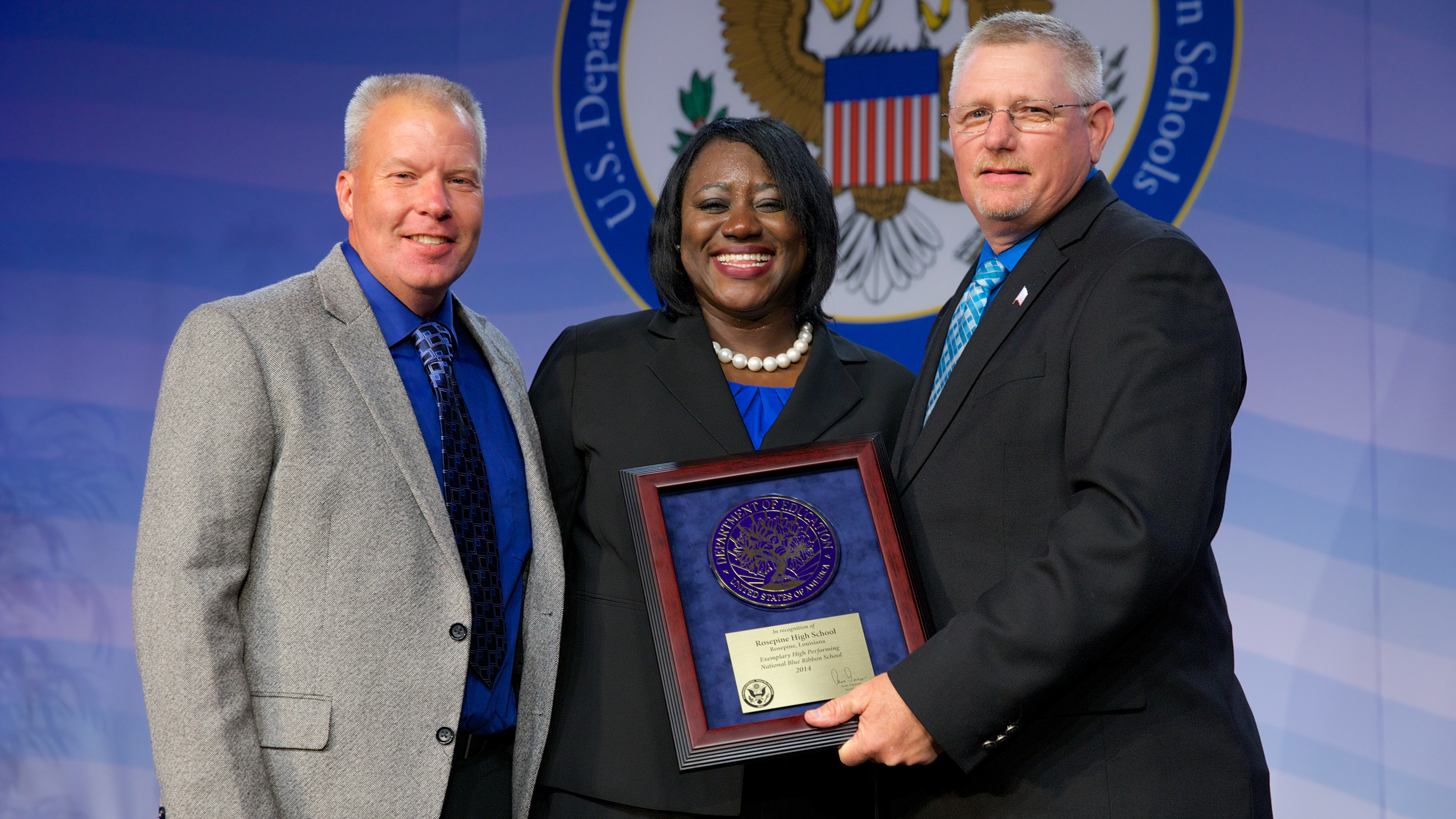
2014 National Blue Ribbon Schools Winner

== Notable alumni ==
- Ethan Frey (2022), professional baseball outfielder (Houston Astros)
