= Westminster Christian Academy (Louisiana) =

- Opelousas, (St. Landry Parish), Louisiana 70570; United States

Information
- Type: Private, Coeducational
- Motto: Soli Deo gloria (Glory to God alone)
- Religious affiliation: Christian
- Grades: K3–12
- Colors: Navy Blue, Columbia Blue, and White
- Mascot: Crusaders
- Team name: Crusaders
- Accreditation: ACSI and Cognia
- Website: www.wcala.org

Westminster Christian Academy is a Christian private school with campuses located in Opelousas, Louisiana and Lafayette, Louisiana. The school officially opened in 1978. WCA is accredited by the Association of Christian Schools International.

== About ==
Westminster Christian Academy has two K3-12 campuses. One in Opelousas, Louisiana and the other in Lafayette, Louisiana. Westminster Christian Academy athletics compete in the LHSAA 1A classification.
