= Hornbeck High School =

Location
- 2363 Stillwell Ave. Hornbeck, Louisiana; 71439; United States; 31°19′32″N 93°23′41″W

Information
- Type: Public
- Established: 1913
- School district: Vernon Parish School District
- NCES School ID: 220183001409
- Principal: Charlotte Hooks
- Teaching staff: 25.44 (FTE)
- Grades: PK–12
- Enrollment: 387 (2023-2024)
- Student to teacher ratio: 15.21
- Colors: White and gold
- Athletics: Basketball, Baseball, Softball, Cross Country and Track
- Mascot: Hornet
- Nickname: Hornets
- Website: hbk.vpsb.us

Hornbeck High School is located in Hornbeck, Louisiana, United States. The PK-12 school is part of the Vernon Parish School District, which is headquartered in Leesville. Since 1898 Hornbeck High School has been the only public school in the community. In 1910 Hornbeck High School became an affiliated high school; the school's crest bears the date 1913.

== Gallery ==
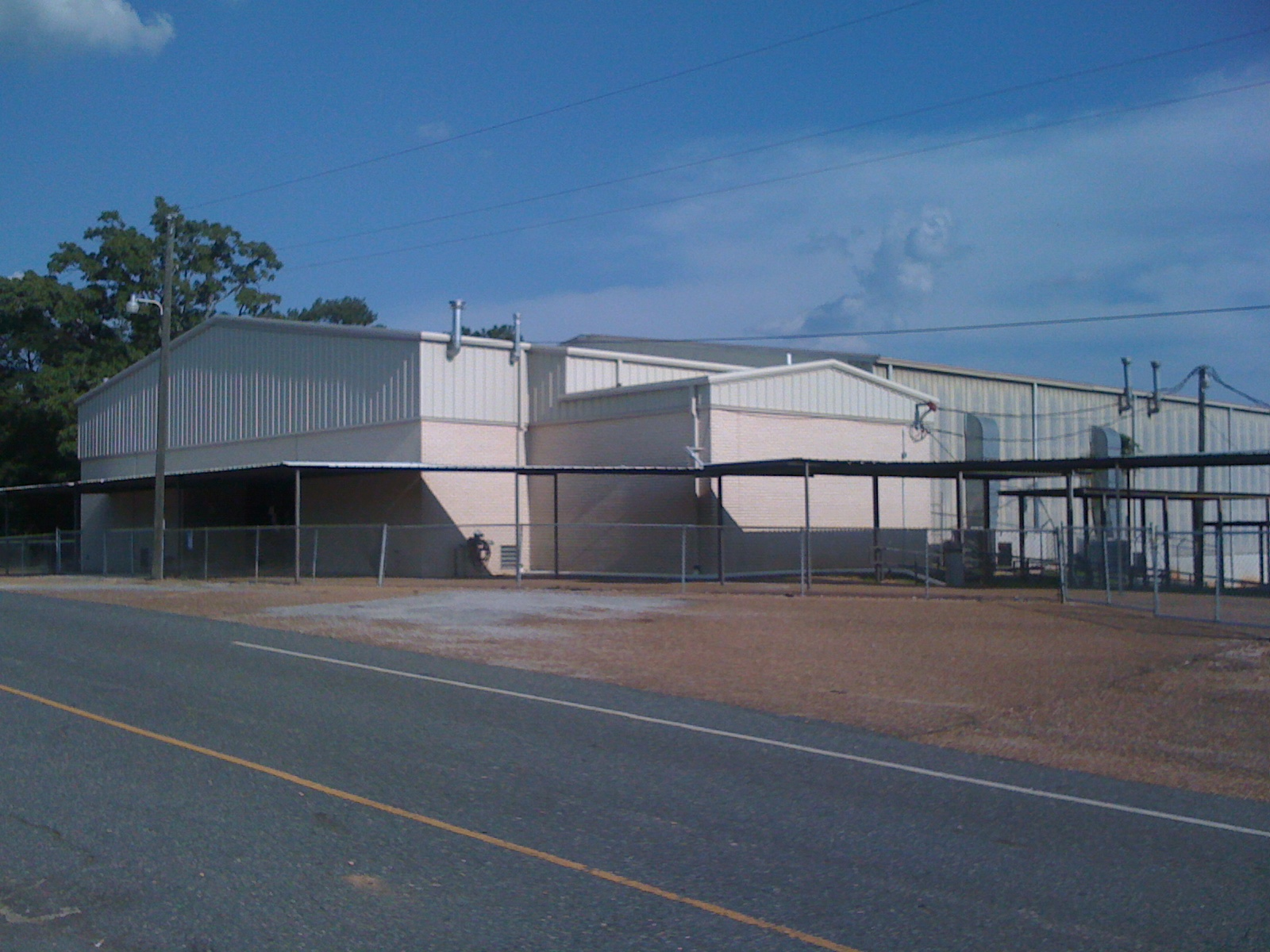
The New Gym 2010

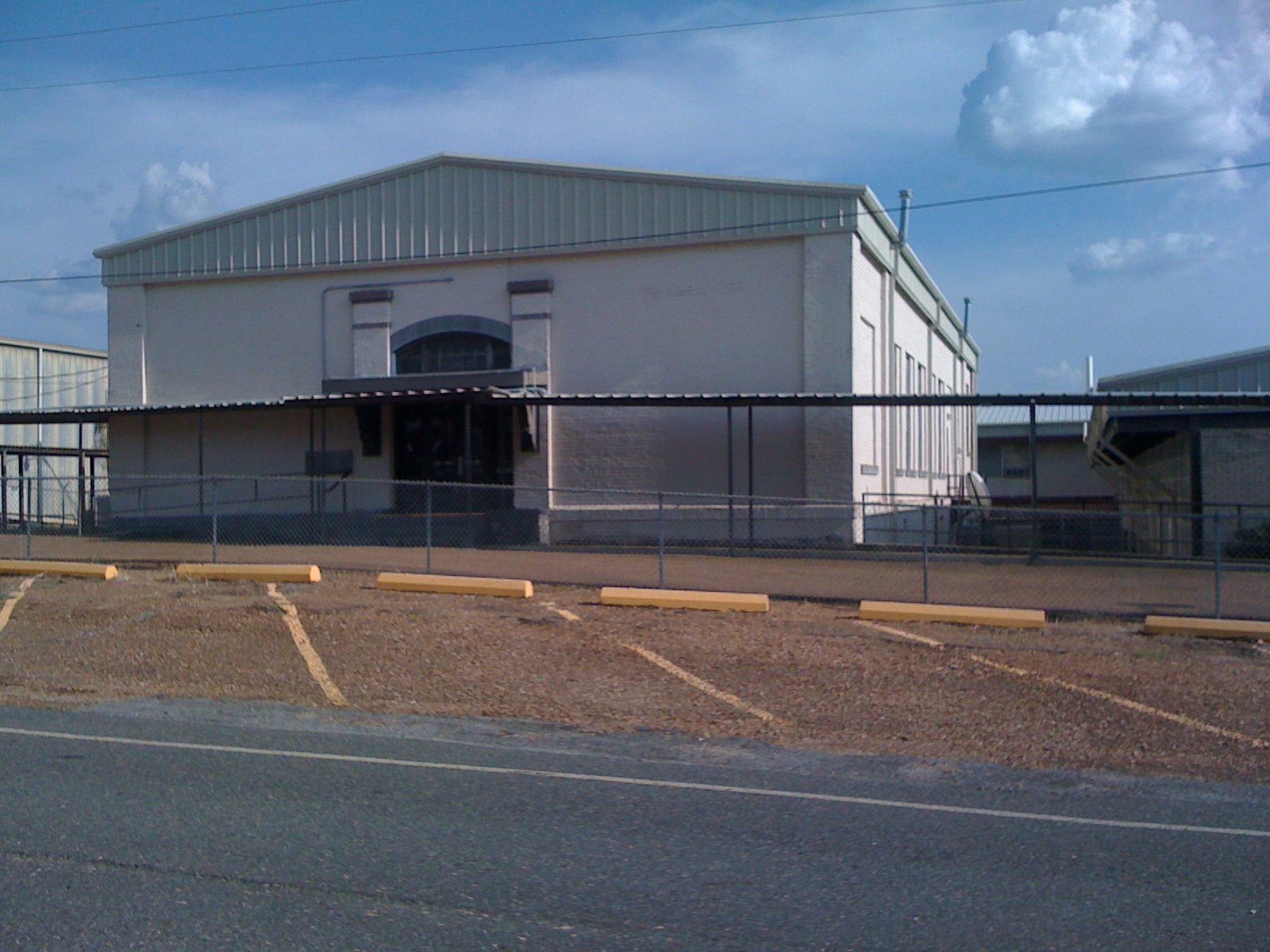
The Auditorium 2010

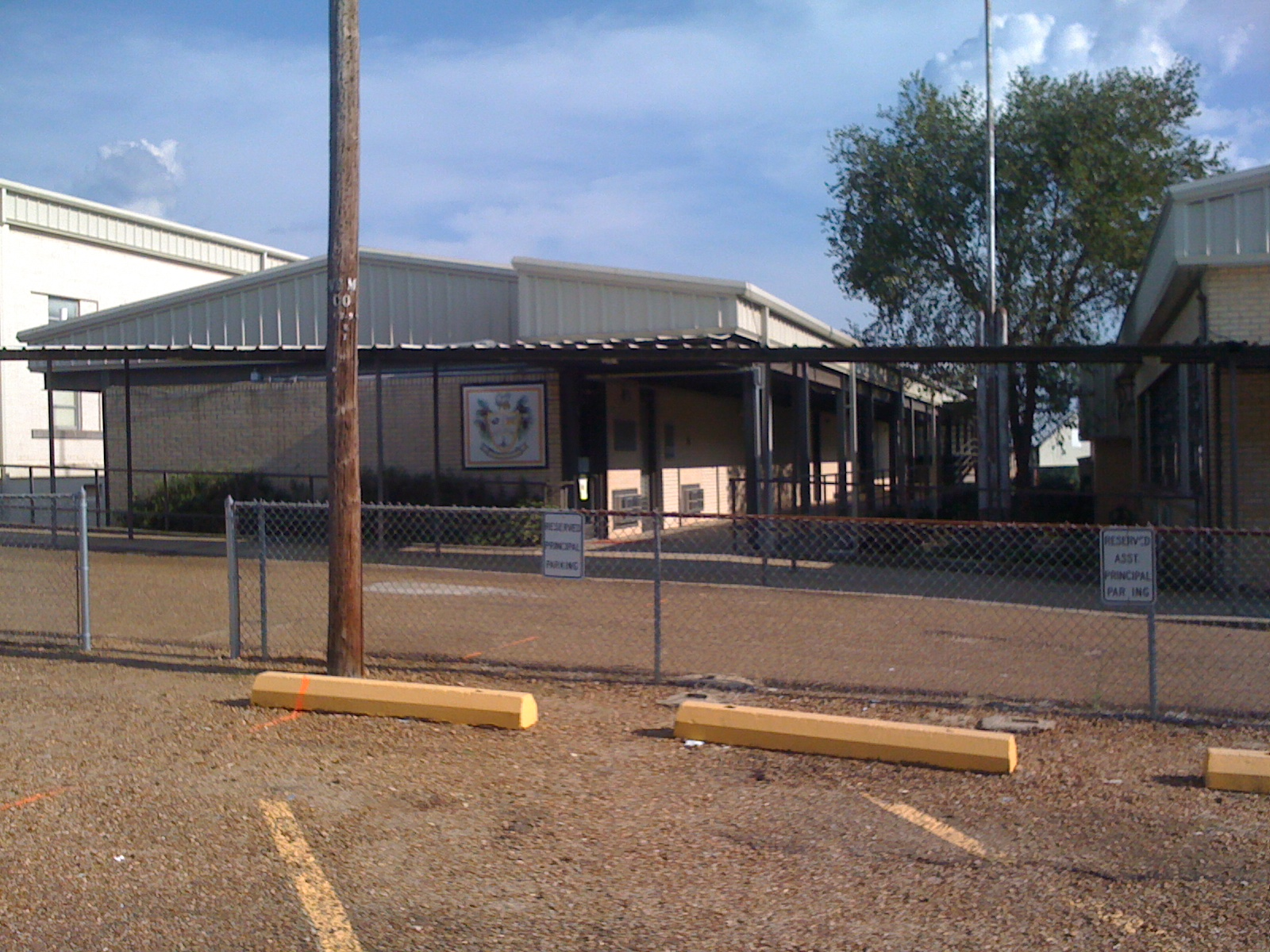
The High School 2010

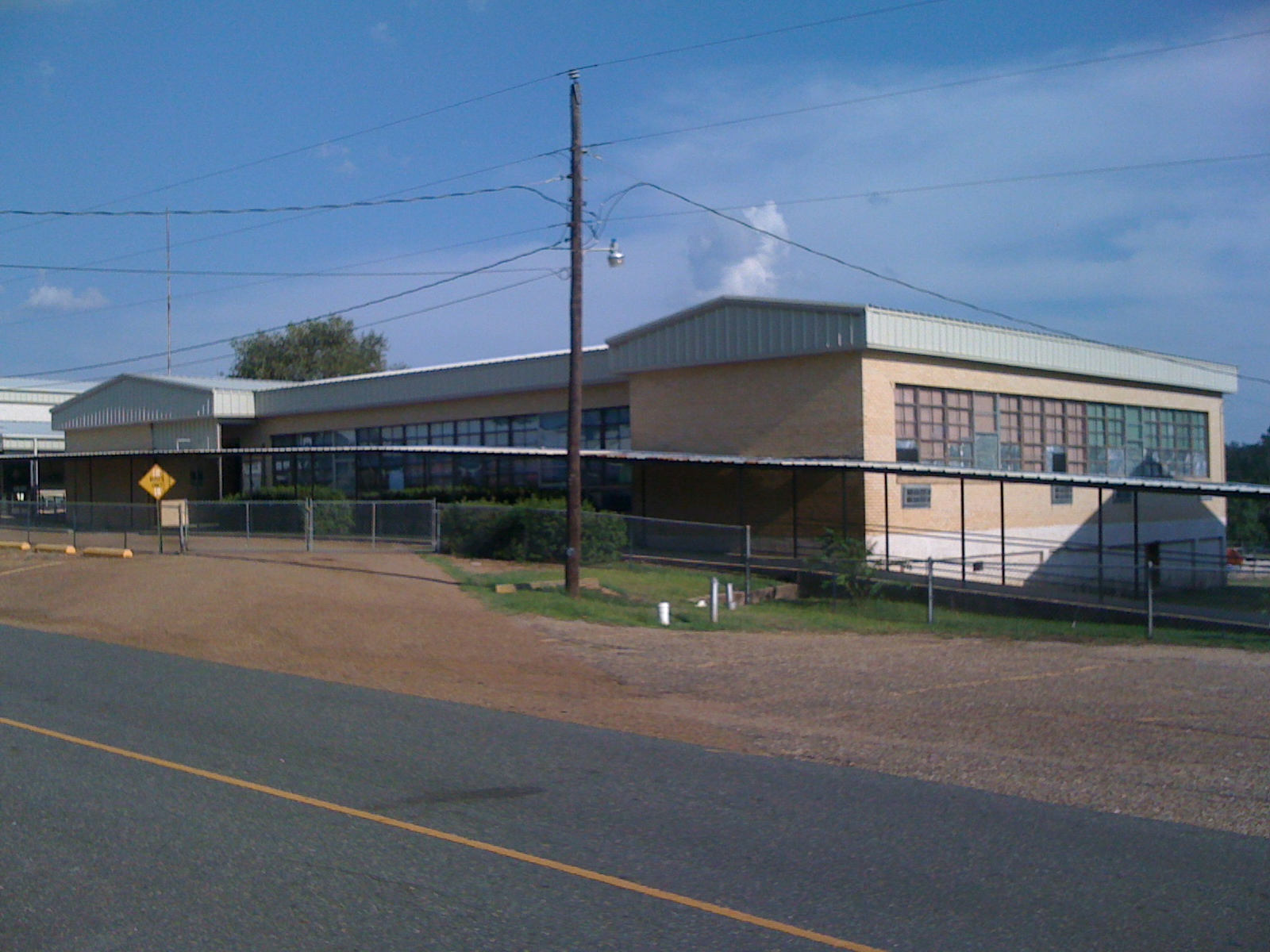
The Elementary School 2010

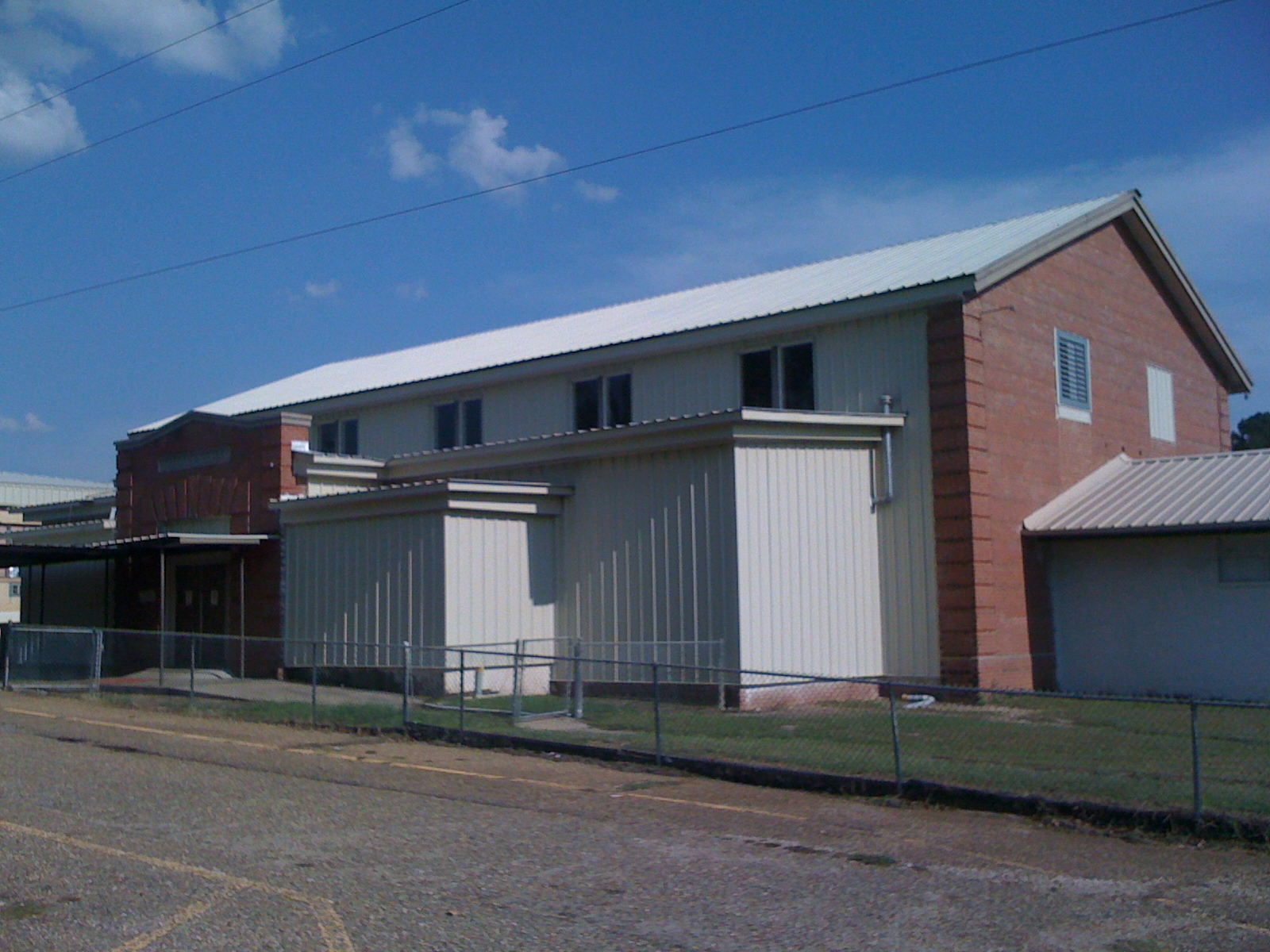
The Old Gym 2010

== Athletics ==
Hornbeck High School is a member of the LHSAA (Louisiana High School Athletic Association) and competes in Class C.
