= Evans High School (Louisiana) =

American public high school

Location
- Louisiana Highway 111; Evans, (Vernon Parish), Louisiana 70639; United States
- Coordinates: 30.9892°N 93.5024°W

Information
- Type: Public high school
- Motto: "Positive choices, positive changes"
- School district: Vernon Parish School Board
- Principal: Kathy Bass
- Staff: 27.83 (FTE)
- Enrollment: 388 (2023-24)
- Student to teacher ratio: 13.94
- Colors: Columbia blue and gold
- Athletics conference: District 3-C
- Nickname: Eagles
- Yearbook: The Evans Eagle
- Website: evans.vpsb.us

Evans High School is a senior high school (grades PK–12) in the community of Evans, Louisiana. It is a part of the Vernon Parish School Board. It is the only school located in District 3, which covers a broad swath of southwest Vernon Parish

== History ==
Though now the only school in southwest Vernon Parish, in the late 19th century there were three schools in the area, Sandspur School (named for the sharp burrs of the southern sandspur grasses which would poke barefoot students as they walked to class), Red Banks School (named for its location near Red Banks Creek), and the Lone Oak and Jane School (whose name origin is unknown). The three disparate schools were consolidated into one, named the Echo School, and a two-room schoolhouse was built on land donated by Charles Simmons, W.N. Loftin, and S.S. Smith.

In 1921, R.D. "Bob" Evans, a descendant of the Ohio pioneers of the area, gave land to the Vernon Parish School board to build the modern-day Evans High School at its location at the intersection of Highway 111 and Yvonne Bonner Road.

The few Black students in District 3 had to attend Vernon Parish Training School, later known as Vernon High School, in Leesville. Students there used second-hand textbooks, some with torn pages and missing chapters, and musical instruments from the all-white Leesville High School. Vernon High School was closed in 1969 with the advent of school integration in Louisiana and Black students of District 3 began attending school in Evans.

In August 2023, Evans High School was briefly closed because of encroaching wildfires from the 2023 Louisiana wildfires.

== Academics ==
At Evans High School, 32% of students scored at or above the proficient level for math, and 47% scored at or above that level for reading.

== Demographics ==
The school’s minority student enrollment is 7%. The student-teacher ratio is 16:1, which is better than that of the district. The student population is made up of 55% female students and 45% male students. The school enrolls 67% economically disadvantaged students.

== Athletics ==
The Evans High School Eagles compete in District 3-C of the Louisiana High School Athletics Association

=== Sports ===
- Baseball
- Boys Basketball
- Girls Basketball
- Cheerleading
- Cross Country
- Softball
- Boys Track and Field
- Girls Track and Field
