= Pickering High School (Louisiana) =

Location
- 180 LeBleu Road; Leesville, Louisiana; United States; 31°02′21″N 93°16′16″W

Information
- Type: Public
- School district: Vernon Parish School Board
- NCES School ID: 220183001664
- Principal: Lacon Daughtry
- Teaching staff: 31.29 (FTE)
- Grades: 7–12
- Enrollment: 462 (2023-2024)
- Student to teacher ratio: 14.77
- Colors: Red, Black, and White
- Mascot: Red Devils
- Yearbook: Red Devil
- Website: phs.vpsb.us

Pickering High School is a public high school located in Leesville, Louisiana, United States. It is part of the Vernon Parish School Board.

== Mascot controversy ==
Meetings were held at the high school in December 1985 regarding concerns over the school's mascot, the Red Devil. Some in the community, including a local minister, regarded the Red Devil mascot as unsuitable for a school for religious reasons.

One member of the Pickering School Building Committee also wanted to see the mascot changed saying, "I know that when a school follows a mascot, such as devils, they have a reputation of a loser." The majority of the attendees of the December meeting were in support of keeping the Red Devil mascot, citing its long history of association with the school and the cost of replacing the mascot with an alternative.

Ultimately, the Pickering building committee decided to drop the issue because, according to one member, debate over the mascot was not important enough to cause division within the community.

== Athletics ==
Pickering High athletics compete in the LHSAA.

=== State Runners-Up ===
Baseball

- (3) 1978, 1987, 1988

Girls Basketball

- (1) 2015

Football

- (3) 1989, 1992, 2018

== Notable alumni ==
- D'Anthony Smith (2006), professional football player.
