= Simpson, Louisiana =

- Village
- Location of Simpson in Vernon Parish, Louisiana.

- Location of Louisiana in the United States
- Coordinates: 31°15′22″N 93°01′08″W
- Country: United States
- State: Louisiana
- Parish: Vernon

Area
  - Total: 8.17 sq mi (21.15 km^{2})
  - Land: 8.12 sq mi (21.03 km^{2})
  - Water: 0.046 sq mi (0.12 km^{2})
- Elevation: 272 ft (83 m)

Population (2020)
  - Total: 585
  - Density: 72.0/sq mi (27.81/km^{2})
- Time zone: UTC-6 (CST)
  - Summer (DST): UTC-5 (CDT)
- Area code: 337
- FIPS code: 22-70595
- GNIS feature ID: 2407547
- Website: www.villageofsimpson.com

Simpson is a village in Vernon Parish, Louisiana, United States. As of the 2020 census, Simpson had a population of 585. It is part of the Fort Polk South Micropolitan Statistical Area.

== Geography ==
According to the United States Census Bureau, the village has a total area of 6.2 square miles (16 km^{2}), of which 6.2 square miles (16 km^{2}) is land and 0.16% is water.

=== Climate ===
This climatic region is typified by hot, humid summers and mild winters. According to the Köppen Climate Classification system, Simpson has a humid subtropical climate, abbreviated "Cfa" on climate maps.

== Demographics ==
Historical population
Census	Pop.	Note	%±
1970	491		—
1980	534		8.8%
1990	536		0.4%
2000	583		8.8%
2010	638		9.4%
2020	585		−8.3%
2025 (est.)	542	▼	−7.4%
U.S. Decennial Census

As of the census of 2000, there were 583 people, 234 households, and 175 families residing in the village. The population density was 93.9 inhabitants per square mile (36.3/km^{2}). There were 267 housing units at an average density of 43.0 per square mile (16.6/km^{2}). The racial makeup of the village was 94.34% White, 0.69% African American, 4.63% Native American, and 0.34% from two or more races. Hispanic or Latino of any race were 1.54% of the population.

There were 234 households, out of which 35.0% had children under the age of 18 living with them, 63.2% were married couples living together, 9.4% had a female householder with no husband present, and 25.2% were non-families. 23.9% of all households were made up of individuals, and 11.1% had someone living alone who was 65 years of age or older. The average household size was 2.49 and the average family size was 2.94.

In the village, the population was spread out, with 25.6% under the age of 18, 6.5% from 18 to 24, 30.2% from 25 to 44, 26.2% from 45 to 64, and 11.5% who were 65 years of age or older. The median age was 38 years. For every 100 females, there were 97.0 males. For every 100 females age 18 and over, there were 92.9 males.

The median income for a household in the village was $36,250, and the median income for a family was $43,333. Males had a median income of $36,184 versus $26,500 for females. The per capita income for the village was $17,485. About 6.1% of families and 8.4% of the population were below the poverty line, including 5.7% of those under age 18 and 8.2% of those age 65 or over.
