= Anacoco, Louisiana =

- Village
- Location of Anacoco in Vernon Parish, Louisiana.

- Location of Louisiana in the United States
- Coordinates: 31°14′57″N 93°20′36″W
- Country: United States
- State: Louisiana
- Parish: Vernon
- Incorporated: 1979

Area
  - Total: 3.09 sq mi (8.00 km^{2})
  - Land: 3.08 sq mi (7.98 km^{2})
  - Water: 0.0077 sq mi (0.02 km^{2})
- Elevation: 322 ft (98 m)

Population (2020)
  - Total: 851
  - Density: 276.0/sq mi (106.58/km^{2})
- Time zone: UTC-6 (CST)
  - Summer (DST): UTC-5 (CDT)
- Area code: 337
- FIPS code: 22-01920
- GNIS feature ID: 2407408

Anacoco is a village in Vernon Parish, Louisiana, United States. As of the 2020 census, Anacoco had a population of 851. It is part of the Fort Johnson South Micropolitan Statistical Area.

== History ==
Anacoco was named after Bayou Anacoco and the Anacoco Prairie, all of the names most likely being ultimately derived from the Spanish "Llano Cuco" (Raincrow Plain). The French rendered this as "l'Anacoco," mistaking the initial letter as the French definite article, which English-speakers subsequently dropped as unnecessary.

== Attraction ==
- South Toledo Bend State Park is located on several small bluffs that extend over and into the Toledo Bend Reservoir. Activities include bass fishing tournaments, hiking, cycling, birding, picnics, and camping. The area is a common nesting ground for the bald eagle.

== Geography ==
According to the United States Census Bureau, the village has a total area of 3.1 square miles (8.0 km^{2}), all land.

=== Climate ===
This climatic region is typified by hot, humid summers and mild winters. According to the Köppen Climate Classification system, Anacoco has a humid subtropical climate, abbreviated "Cfa" on climate maps.

Climate data for Anacoco, Louisiana
Month	Jan	Feb	Mar	Apr	May	Jun	Jul	Aug	Sep	Oct	Nov	Dec	Year
Mean daily maximum °C (°F)	14 (57)	16 (61)	21 (69)	24 (76)	29 (84)	32 (89)	34 (93)	34 (93)	31 (87)	26 (78)	20 (68)	16 (60)	24 (76)
Mean daily minimum °C (°F)	2 (36)	4 (39)	8 (46)	12 (53)	16 (61)	20 (68)	22 (71)	21 (70)	18 (65)	12 (54)	7 (45)	3 (38)	12 (54)
Average precipitation mm (inches)	130 (5.3)	120 (4.6)	120 (4.9)	91 (3.6)	120 (4.8)	140 (5.6)	91 (3.6)	86 (3.4)	91 (3.6)	110 (4.4)	140 (5.5)	140 (5.6)	1,400 (55)
Source: Weatherbase

== Demographics ==
Historical population
Census	Pop.	Note	%±
1980	820		—
1990	823		0.4%
2000	866		5.2%
2010	869		0.3%
2020	851		−2.1%
2025 (est.)	788	▼	−7.4%
U.S. Decennial Census

As of the census of 2000, there were 866 people, 346 households, and 255 families residing in the village. The population density was 280.5 inhabitants per square mile (108.3/km^{2}). There were 376 housing units at an average density of 121.8 per square mile (47.0/km^{2}). The racial makeup of the village was 93.65% White, 0.12% African American, 1.62% Native American, 1.04% Asian, 0.12% Pacific Islander, 0.92% from other races, and 2.54% from two or more races. Hispanic or Latino of any race were 2.42% of the population.

There were 346 households, out of which 34.4% had children under the age of 18 living with them, 63.0% were married couples living together, 8.7% had a female householder with no husband present, and 26.3% were non-families. 25.1% of all households were made up of individuals, and 13.0% had someone living alone who was 65 years of age or older. The average household size was 2.50 and the average family size was 2.97.

In the village, the population was spread out, with 26.9% under the age of 18, 6.0% from 18 to 24, 26.9% from 25 to 44, 25.8% from 45 to 64, and 14.4% who were 65 years of age or older. The median age was 38 years. For every 100 females, there were 94.6 males. For every 100 females age 18 and over, there were 87.8 males.

The median income for a household in the village was $37,303, and the median income for a family was $41,875. Males had a median income of $37,500 versus $23,125 for females. The per capita income for the village was $15,300. About 9.2% of families and 12.3% of the population were below the poverty line, including 14.8% of those under age 18 and 14.4% of those age 65 or over.

== Court ==
Anacoco has a Mayor's Court with the jurisdiction to try misdemeanor cases that occurs within the municipality. A person can appeal a decision of a Mayor's Court to the appropriate parish court with jurisdiction that will try the case de nova or "as new".
