= Rosepine, Louisiana =

- Town
- Town of Rosepine
- Location of Rosepine in Vernon Parish, Louisiana.

- Location of Louisiana in the United States
- Coordinates: 30°55′15″N 93°17′09″W
- Country: United States
- State: Louisiana
- Parish: Vernon

Government
  - Mayor: Donna Weeks-Duvall (I)

Area
  - Total: 2.43 sq mi (6.30 km^{2})
  - Land: 2.42 sq mi (6.28 km^{2})
  - Water: 0.0039 sq mi (0.01 km^{2})
- Elevation: 210 ft (64 m)

Population (2020)
  - Total: 1,519
  - Density: 626.0/sq mi (241.69/km^{2})
- Time zone: UTC-6 (CST)
  - Summer (DST): UTC-5 (CDT)
- ZIP code: 70659
- Area code: 337
- FIPS code: 22-66200
- GNIS feature ID: 2407247
- Website: townofrosepine.com

Rosepine is a town in Vernon Parish, Louisiana, United States. As of the 2020 census, Rosepine had a population of 1,519. It is part of the Fort Polk Micropolitan Statistical Area.

== History ==
In 1897 the Kansas City, Shreveport & Gulf Railway Company (KCS&G), owned by the Kansas City, Pittsburg and Gulf Railroad (KCP&G) was completed through Rosepine, Dequincy, and on to Port Arthur, Texas. By 1901 sawmills of Brice Brothers and Craft, Diamond Lumber Company Ltd, Lewis and Williams, and Rosepine Lumber Company were in operation. In 1900 the Kansas City Southern Railway took possession of the KCS&G.

Rosepine was incorporated in 1902, with J.J. Cryer as mayor. and reincorporated in 1950. In 1900 the town had 75 residents but grew to more than 1,000 by 1906.

== Geography ==
According to the United States Census Bureau, the town has a total area of 2.2 square miles (5.8 km^{2}), all land. It is located sixteen miles southwest of Leesville.

== Demographics ==
Historical population
Census	Pop.	Note	%±
1910	325		—
1930	214		—
1940	407		90.2%
1950	334		−17.9%
1960	414		24.0%
1970	587		41.8%
1980	953		62.4%
1990	1,135		19.1%
2000	1,390		22.5%
2010	1,692		21.7%
2020	1,519		−10.2%
2025 (est.)	1,454	▼	−4.3%
U.S. Decennial Census

=== 2020 census ===
As of the 2020 census, Rosepine had a population of 1,519. The median age was 37.8 years. 25.2% of residents were under the age of 18 and 18.2% of residents were 65 years of age or older. For every 100 females there were 83.7 males, and for every 100 females age 18 and over there were 80.3 males age 18 and over.

88.8% of residents lived in urban areas, while 11.2% lived in rural areas.

There were 603 households in Rosepine, of which 37.8% had children under the age of 18 living in them. Of all households, 44.8% were married-couple households, 14.9% were households with a male householder and no spouse or partner present, and 35.7% were households with a female householder and no spouse or partner present. About 27.2% of all households were made up of individuals and 11.3% had someone living alone who was 65 years of age or older.

There were 704 housing units, of which 14.3% were vacant. The homeowner vacancy rate was 1.7% and the rental vacancy rate was 18.9%.

Rosepine racial composition
Race	Number	Percentage
White (non-Hispanic)	1,167	76.83%
Black or African American (non-Hispanic)	123	8.1%
Native American	19	1.25%
Asian	8	0.53%
Pacific Islander	2	0.13%
Other/Mixed	66	4.34%
Hispanic or Latino	134	8.82%

=== 2000 census ===
As of the census of 2000, there were 1,390 people, 498 households, and 355 families residing in the town. The population density was 622.5 inhabitants per square mile (240.3/km^{2}). There were 563 housing units at an average density of 252.2 per square mile (97.4/km^{2}). The racial makeup of the town was 85.47% White, 5.83% African American, 1.08% Native American, 1.65% Asian, 2.95% from other races, and 3.02% from two or more races. Hispanic or Latino of any race were 5.97% of the population.

There were 498 households, out of which 38.8% had children under the age of 18 living with them, 53.4% were married couples living together, 14.9% had a female householder with no husband present, and 28.7% were non-families. 24.9% of all households were made up of individuals, and 9.0% had someone living alone who was 65 years of age or older. The average household size was 2.61 and the average family size was 3.13.

In the town, the population was spread out, with 27.6% under the age of 18, 11.4% from 18 to 24, 28.1% from 25 to 44, 18.0% from 45 to 64, and 15.0% who were 65 years of age or older. The median age was 34 years. For every 100 females, there were 93.9 males. For every 100 females age 18 and over, there were 91.1 males.

The median income for a household in the town was $30,063, and the median income for a family was $32,778. Males had a median income of $28,988 versus $23,958 for females. The per capita income for the town was $13,101. About 15.9% of families and 19.8% of the population were below the poverty line, including 22.3% of those under age 18 and 15.3% of those age 65 or over.
