= Gwendolyn Knight =

American artist

- Born: May 26, 1913; Bridgetown, Barbados
- Died: February 18, 2005 (aged 91); Seattle, Washington
- Education: Howard University; Harlem Community Arts Center
- Known for: Painting
- Notable work: Works Projects Administration (WPA)
- Awards: Women's Caucus for Art Lifetime Achievement Award

Gwendolyn Clarine Knight (May 26, 1913 – February 18, 2005) was an American artist born in Bridgetown, Barbados, in the West Indies, who later moved to St. Louis and then New York.

Knight painted throughout her life but did not start seriously exhibiting until the 1970s. She then moved to Seattle in 1971 along with her husband. Her first retrospective, "Never Late for Heaven: The Art of Gwen Knight," was put on when she was nearly 90 years old at the Tacoma Art Museum in 2003. Her teachers in the arts included sculptor Augusta Savage (who obtained support for her from the Works Progress Administration) and Jacob Lawrence, whom she married in 1941 and remained married to until his death in 2000. She created mostly portraits and still life art. During the course of her career, she received many awards, including the National Honor Award, and two honorary doctorate degrees, from University of Minnesota and Seattle University.

With her husband, Knight founded the Jacob and Gwendolyn Knight Lawrence Foundation in 2000, initially to support the early careers of professional artists. When Lawrence died, Knight disbanded the original foundation and changed her will so that most of the couple's assets went to support children's programs. Today the Foundation's activities are devoted to the maintenance of a website that had been developed in 2000. The U.S. copyright representative for the Jacob and Gwendolyn Knight Lawrence Foundation is the Artists Rights Society.

== Biography ==
=== Early life and education ===
Knight was born in 1913 in Barbados, West Indies. At the age of seven, her mother entrusted her to close friends with whom she immigrated to the United States. She and her foster family first lived in St. Louis, Missouri. At age 13, she and her foster family moved to Harlem (New York City), where she graduated from Wadleigh High School in 1930. From 1931 to 1933 she attended Howard University, studying fine arts. The Great Depression caused financial hardship, causing Knight to drop out before receiving her degree.

=== Adulthood ===
Knight subsequently returned to New York City, where she was employed by the Works Projects Administration as an assistant to the muralist, Charles Alston. She continued to study art at the Harlem Community Art Center, where she was mentored by Augusta Savage. Through Savage, she met or was exposed to the work of Langston Hughes, Ralph Ellison, Romare Bearden, Claude McKay and other artists, poets, and writers of the Harlem Renaissance.

In 1934 Knight joined a Works Progress Administration (WPA) mural project, where she met her future husband and fellow painter, Jacob Lawrence. The couple were married in 1941. In 1946, Josef Albers invited them to teach at Black Mountain College, which had begun integrating and incorporating African-American culture into its curriculum a few years prior to the couple's time there. During the 1950s, the couple worked and lived in New York. Then in 1964, they traveled to Nigeria. In 1971, Lawrence accepted a position at University of Washington’s School of Art. The couple moved to Seattle, where they lived as active members of the artist community and of the city itself. Knight even procured support from The National Links, Inc. for her first one-woman show, developed in 1976. This exhibit sparked a greater desire for her work and the acquiring of her pieces by national museums.

=== Death ===
Knight survived Lawrence. She died in Seattle on February 18, 2005, at the age of 91.

== Work ==
Knight's work focused on narrative paintings depicting the life, culture, and history of African Americans, through still life, portraits, and urban scenes. The majority of her career produced oil portraits of friends, figure studies of dancers, and watercolor and gouache landscapes. However, her work began to shift in the 1990s incorporating lyrical depictions of animals through etchings and monoprints. Her inspiration came from spontaneous responses to her surroundings, as well as African dance, sculpture, and theater.

== Exhibitions ==
Knight did not begin exhibiting her work publicly until the 1970s. Knight had several major solo exhibitions: Seattle Art Museum (1976), Virginia Lacy Jones Gallery, Atlanta University (1988), Francine Seders Gallery in Seattle (1994), Never Late for Heaven: The Art of Gwen Knight, at the Tacoma Art Museum (2003) and at DC Moore Gallery, New York in 2003. Her work was included in several group exhibitions, including the 1967 show, Portrayal of the Negroes in American Painting at the Forum Gallery.

== Awards and honors ==
In 1993, Knight received the Women's Caucus for Art Lifetime Achievement Award. She was honored with the Caucus Centennial Medallion, from the Black Caucus. In 1984 she received the Centennial Award of Merit from Arizona State University, and in 1994, she received the Pioneer Award, Twelfth Annual Artists' Salute to Black History Month.

== Selected collections ==
- Gwendolyn Knight at the Minneapolis Institute of Art, Minneapolis, Minnesota
- Museum of Modern Art, New York
- St. Louis Art Museum
- Seattle Art Museum

== Works ==
Some of her works are:

- Afternoon of a Faun, 1994
- Pleas and Thank Yous: 100 True Stories, 1991
- Diva, 1994
- Figure Study No. 3, 1975
- Cat III, 1994
- Jacob, 1986
- Self Portrait, 1991
- Portrait of a Girl
- New Orleans, 2002
- The Boudoir, 1945
- The White Dress, 1999
- Still Life 1960,
- Dusk, 1960
- Head of a Dancer, 1960

== See also ==
- List of African-American visual artists
- List of Federal Art Project artists
