= Albright College =

Private college in Reading, Pennsylvania, US

- Former names: Union Seminary (1856–1887); Central Pennsylvania College (1887–1902); Schuylkill Seminary (1881–1923); Schuylkill College (1923–1929); Albright Collegiate Institute (1895–1898)
- Motto: Veritas et Justitia
- Motto in English: Truth and Justice
- Type: Private liberal arts college
- Established: 1856; 170 years ago
- Religious affiliation: United Methodist Church
- Academic affiliations: Annapolis Group
- President: Debra Townsley (interim)
- Faculty: 87 full-time and 47 part-time (Fall 2024)
- Students: 1,380 (Fall 2024)
- Undergraduates: 1,230 (Fall 2024)
- Postgraduates: 150 (Fall 2024)
- Location: Reading, Pennsylvania, U.S. 40°21′39″N 75°54′37″W
- Campus: Suburban, 118 acres (48 ha)
- Colors: Albright red, Albright gray, white
- Nickname: Lions
- Sporting affiliations: NCAA Division III; MAC Commonwealth
- Website: albright.edu
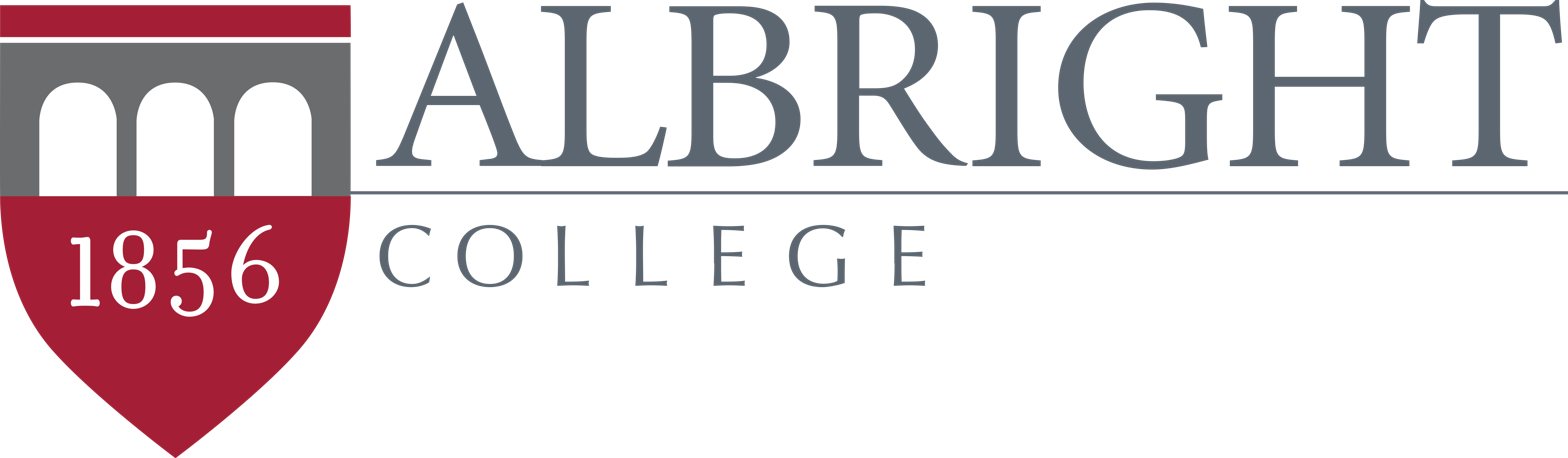

Albright College is a private liberal arts college in Reading, Pennsylvania, United States. It was founded in 1856 and had an enrollment of 1,380 students as of fall 2024.

== History ==
Albright College traces its founding to 1856 when Union Seminary opened. Present-day Albright was formed by the mergers of several institutions: Albright Collegiate Institute, Central Pennsylvania College, and Schuylkill College.

Albright Collegiate Institute opened in 1895 and was renamed Albright College three years later. Union Seminary, meanwhile, became Central Pennsylvania College in 1887 and merged with Albright College in 1902. Schuylkill Seminary, the third institution, was founded in 1881, became Schuylkill College in 1923, and merged into Albright in 1928.

Albright's campus relocated from Myerstown, to Schuylkill College's campus, which is the present location of Albright, at the base of Mount Penn in Reading.

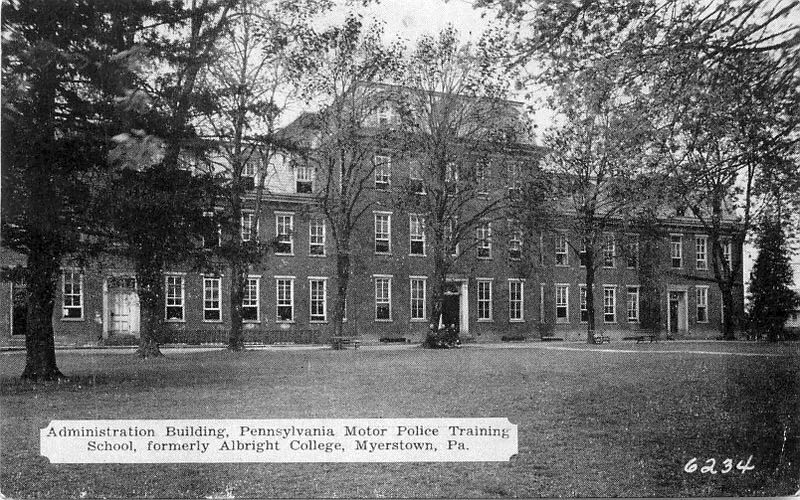
College main building in 1947

The college is named for Pennsylvania-German evangelical preacher Jacob Albright, who founded the Evangelical Association (later known as the Evangelical United Brethren Church). Born in 1759 in Douglass Township, (now Montgomery County) with the given name of Johannes Jacob Albrecht, the family changed their surname to "Albright" following Jacob's 1808 death.

In the late 2010s, enrollment began to decline at the college. By 2023, enrollment had declined to 1,652 students, a decline of nearly one-third from what it was in 2010. This had significant financial implications for the college which had a $20.3 million deficit in 2023. In response, the college laid off 53 employees between 2022 and 2024. In late 2024, the college also requested permission to draw a $25 million loan from its $53.1 million dollar endowment. Shortly thereafter, the college's interim president announced plans to cut two degree programs but also launch several new programs and athletic teams.

In 2025, the college fired the staff of the Freedman Gallery and sold off the gallery's art collection, including works by Romare Bearden, Elizabeth Catlett, Salvador Dalí, Jasper Johns, Jacob Lawrence, and Robert Rauschenberg. The move prompted outrage by Albright donors and museum professionals, especially since the sale would do little to help Albright's budgetary problems.

=== President ===
- Debra M. Townsley (2024–present)

== Academics ==
Albright College students are encouraged to cross and combine areas of study without taking longer to graduate. The college offers Bachelor of Arts and Bachelor of Science degrees, as well as a Master of Arts and Master of Science degrees in education. The college also offers online and accelerated degree programs.

Albright offers a wide range of classical and pre-professional programs. It created one of the first undergraduate psychobiology programs in the nation in the 1960s. The college's liberal arts curriculum has a cross-program focus that allows students to create an individualized education. Fully half of Albright students have concentrations that combine two or three fields of learning.

The theatre program has been honored by the Kennedy Center American College Theater Festival consistently for many years. Albright's Domino Players Company has been invited to perform at the Region II KCACTF Festival 10 times in the last 18 years (2004, 2007, 2009, 2011, 2013, 2014, 2015, 2016, 2019 and 2020). At the National Conference held every April in Washington DC, Albright's theatre program has garnered dozens of awards for distinguished work in performance, direction, dramaturgy, scenic, sound, costume, and lighting design. Acclaimed productions of "Waiting for Godot" (2007), "Clybourne Park" (2016), "A Raisin in the Sun" (2018) have also been named "Outstanding Production of a Play" – recognizing them as the best college production of their years. "A Raisin in the Sun" also received eight other national awards, for distinguished performance, scenic and lighting design, director and performances.

The Albright Creative Research Experience (ACRE) is a multi-disciplinary program that affords undergraduate students the opportunity to conduct research or pursue creative endeavors during the three-week January Interim or summer break. The students, who work one-on-one with faculty members, can be from any discipline, from STEM subjects to the humanities.

=== Academic program changes ===
In November 2026, Albright College announced changes to its undergraduate academic offerings, effective for incoming students beginning in the 2027–28 academic year. The restructuring included discontinuing several academic programs, consolidating offerings, and reclassifying certain majors and minors as areas of secondary focus.

The revised curriculum introduced two interdisciplinary majors, Behavioral Studies and Humanities. Several programs, including Child and Family Studies, Creative Writing, Digital Communications, Digital Media, Religious Studies, and Women's and Gender Studies, were discontinued. Other programs were reclassified, including English, History, Mathematics, Chemistry, and Political Science, which became areas of secondary focus.

The changes applied to incoming students and did not affect students already enrolled in the affected programs.

=== Rankings ===
In 2017, Albright College was named one of the "Best Northeastern" schools by The Princeton Review; this was the fourteenth consecutive year that the college was included in that category. For 2024, U.S. News & World Report ranked the college tied at #146 out of 211 in National Liberal Arts Colleges and tied at #31 in Top Performers on Social Mobility. In 2018, U.S. News ranked Albright 33rd out of 208 national liberal arts colleges in the "Campus Ethnic Diversity" category, and in the "Economic Diversity" category, Albright ranked 27th out of 210 national liberal arts schools. The Economist magazine listed Albright among the top 50 American colleges and universities for economic value in 2015.

== Athletics ==
Albright College athletic teams compete in the National Collegiate Athletic Association (NCAA) Division III as a member of the Middle Atlantic Conferences.

Charles "Pop" Kelchner founded the men's basketball team in 1900 and was athletic director at Albright College for 21 years. He was involved in aspects of Major League Baseball for over 50 years. Albright College dedicated the baseball field as Kelchner Field in 1952. Branch Rickey gave the dedication speech, with Connie Mack in attendance. Kelchner was a graduate of Lafayette College with two degrees and was proficient in German, French, Italian, Spanish, Classical Latin and Greek. He served as Professor of Languages and athletic director.

Doggie Julian was the head football coach at Albright from 1929 to 1930. Biggie Munn was the head football coach at Albright College from 1935 to 1936, before coaching Syracuse University (1946), and most notably Michigan State College (1947–1953), where his 1952 squad won a national championship.

William "Lone Star" Dietz was the director of athletics and head football coach at Albright from 1937 to 1942. Dietz led the football team to their first undefeated season in 1937. He previously led Washington State to 1916 Rose Bowl victory. In the National Football League, Dietz had coached the Boston "Redskins" (1933–1934), the forerunner of the Washington Commanders. Dietz is in the Albright College Athletic Hall of Fame and the College Football Hall of Fame.

In 1948, the University of Maryland Eastern Shore (UMES) and Albright College played the first intercollegiate football game between an Historically Black Colleges and Universities (HBCU) institution and a majority-white institution.

The Philadelphia Eagles held preseason training camp at Albright from 1968 through 1972.

Wilbur G. Renken was athletic director and basketball head coach for 38 consecutive seasons. A highly regarded figure in collegiate athletics in general and specifically basketball, Renken was the president of the United States Olympic Basketball Team Selection Committee for the 1976 Olympic Games. He also served as the president of the National Association of Basketball Coaches (NABC) in 1979–1980.

On October 11, 2017, sophomore backup quarterback Gyree Durante was dismissed from the football team for kneeling during the national anthem before the team's game against Delaware Valley University, going against a collective team decision made before the game to kneel for the coin toss and stand for the anthem. Then-president Jacquelyn Fetrow later offered reinstatement to the team to Durante (and two other players who did not fully kneel during the coin toss), saying that further review of the details surrounding the game's events found that "what we understood to be shared agreement among players, student leaders and coaches has not been adequately supported." Durante, however, declined reinstatement, citing his former teammates' stated lack of trust in him.

== WXAC ==
Albright's campus radio station, WXAC 91.3 FM is a student-operated college radio station. The initial call name was WALC, but was later changed to WXAC on March 8, 1965. WALC had been the same call name for the Alcoa Steamship Lines.

== Notable alumni ==
- Chester Anuszak (stage name: Jon Dough), class of 1984, adult film actor
- Haps Benfer, class of 1914, college football, basketball, and baseball head coach
- Joseph E. Coleman, class of 1948, politician, attorney and chemist; first African-American elected president of Philadelphia City Council
- Leo Disend, class of 1938, played tackle with the Green Bay Packers and the Brooklyn Dodgers football team
- Edwin Erickson, class of 1960, State Senator, Pennsylvania
- Jacquelyn S. Fetrow, class of 1982, computational biologist, former president of Albright College, former Provost and Professor of Chemistry at the University of Richmond
- John Fetterman, class of 1991, United States Senator, 2023–present; 34th Lieutenant Governor of Pennsylvania, 2019–2023
- Doris Freedman, class of 1950, pioneer in the field of public art
- Robert Gerhart, class of 1941, Pennsylvania State Senator for the 11th district from 1969 to 1972
- Robert P. Hollenbeck (born 1931), politician who served six terms in the New Jersey General Assembly from the 36th Legislative District.
- Thomas R. Kline, class of 1969, leading trial lawyer
- Casey Lawrence, class of 2010, professional baseball pitcher for the Toronto Blue Jays of Major League Baseball
- Mũkoma wa Ngũgĩ, class of 1994, Kenyan poet and author, Associate Professor of English and Africana Studies at Cornell University
- Hidy Ochiai, class of 1966, author and actor, introduced the Washin-Ryu style of karate in the United States
- Anthony Portantino, class of 1983, State Senator, California
- Anthony Serianni, class of 1975, Professor of Chemistry and Biochemistry at the University of Notre Dame
- Danene Sorace, class of 1994, Mayor of Lancaster, Pennsylvania, former director of Answer program at Rutgers University.
- Bob Spitz, class of 1971, celebrity biographer
- Walter L. Stewart Jr., class of 1990, US Army major general
- Matthew Urbanski, class of 1985, landscape architect
- Russell Weigley, class of 1952, Distinguished University Professor of History at Temple University
- Victor Yarnell, class of 1951, 41st Mayor of Reading, Pennsylvania
