= Debra Townsley =

American academic administrator

Interim President of Albright College
- Incumbent
- Assumed office July 1, 2024
- Preceded by: Jacquelyn S. Fetrow

7th President of Labouré College
- In office 2018 – June 30, 2019
- Preceded by: Jack P. Calareso
- Succeeded by: Lily Hsu

10th President of William Peace University
- In office 2010 – June 30, 2015
- Preceded by: Laura C. Bingham
- Succeeded by: Brian Ralph

6th President of Nichols College
- In office 1998–2010
- Preceded by: James J. Darazsdi
- Succeeded by: Gerald Fels (interim)

Personal details
- Education: American University (BA); University of Vermont (PhD); George Washington University (MBA)

Debra M. Townsley is an American academic administrator who served as interim president of Albright College since 2024. She was previously president of Nichols College from 1998 to 2010, William Peace University from 2010 to 2015, and Labouré College from 2018 to 2019. Throughout her career, she led significant institutional changes, including transitioning Peace College to a coeducational institution.

== Life ==
Townsley grew up in Pittsburgh, Pennsylvania. She earned bachelor's degrees from American University, a M.A. in psychology and a Ph.D. in industrial and organizational psychology from the University of Vermont, and a M.B.A. from George Washington University.

Townsley began her career at IBM and Booz Allen Hamilton before transitioning to academia at Marymount University. After three years, she became an assistant professor and chair of the accounting and data processing departments at Northern Virginia Community College, where she also taught business. Townsley later served as director of undergraduate and graduate management studies at Saint Michael's College.

=== President of Nichols College (1998–2010) ===
She joined Nichols College as dean of academic affairs. In 1998, she became its sixth president, the first woman to hold the role. Under her leadership, the college introduced new academic specializations, including arts and entertainment, and expanded its facilities with new residence halls, an athletic center, and apartment-style senior suites. During the 2008 financial crisis, Townsley navigated the institution through economic challenges with financial planning. Nichols College maintained its position as the largest Master of Business Administration program in Central Massachusetts during this period. She resigned in 2010.

=== President of Peace College (2010–2015) ===
In 2010, Townsley became the tenth president of Peace College, succeeding Laura C. Bingham. During her tenure, the college underwent significant changes, including renaming the institution William Peace University and allowing men to enroll in its day programs starting in 2012. Under her leadership, the university experienced increased enrollment. While supported by the board, her administration faced criticism from some faculty, students, and alumnae regarding reduced faculty numbers and various campus issues. Townsley announced her retirement in 2013, declining an extension of her contract. She retired on June 30, 2015.

=== Additional presidencies ===
In February 2017, Townsley became the interim president of Wheeling Univrersity. In the spring of 2018, she became the seventh president of Labouré College, serving until July 1, 2019.

On July 1, 2024, she became the interim president of Albright College.
