= Henry Bannarn =

American sculptor and painter

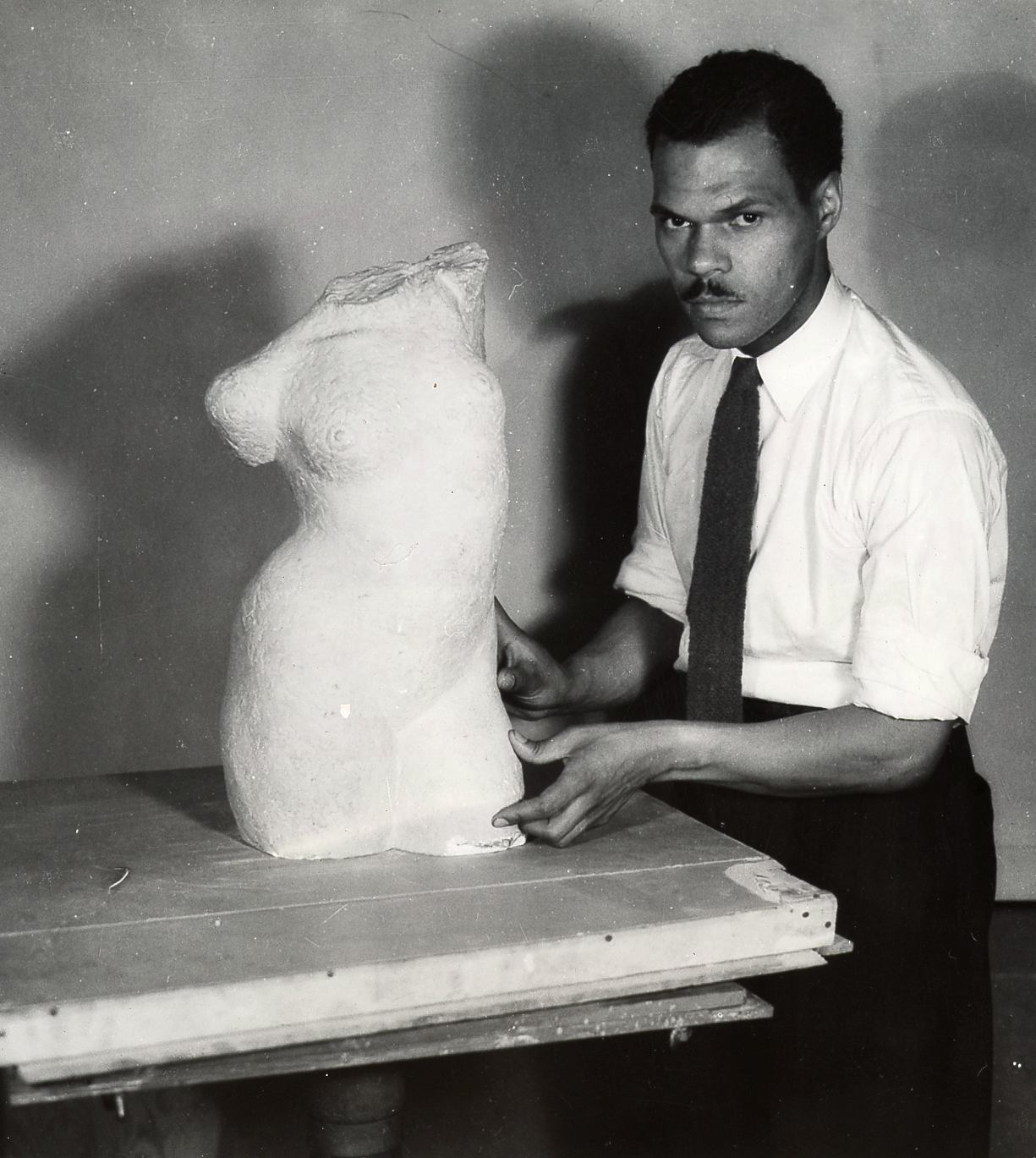
- Henry Bannarn, ca. 1937
- Born: July 17, 1910; Wetumka, Oklahoma
- Died: September 20, 1965 (aged 55); Brooklyn, New York

Henry Wilmer "Mike" Bannarn ( From July 17, 1910 – September 20, 1965) was an African-American artist, best known for his work during the Harlem Renaissance period. He is known for his work in sculpture and as a character artist in the various paint mediums, Conté crayon, pastel, and free-form sketch.

== Biography ==
He was born in Wetumka, Hughes County, Oklahoma, on July 17 , 1910. When he was still a child, the family moved to Minneapolis, Minnesota, where he discovered his talent for art. He studied at the Minneapolis School of Arts (now known as the Minneapolis College of Art and Design).

He worked as a Works Progress Administration artist for the Federal Art Project and taught art at the Harlem Community Art Center in New York City, where he was a noted contemporary, friend and partner of another famous African-American artist, Charles Alston, with whom he ran the Alston-Bannarn Harlem Art Workshop in Harlem/NYC, NY. He was intimately associated with the "Harlem Renaissance" of the 1930s, being considered as one of the movement's preeminent contributors. Although he is primarily known for his work in sculpture, he was equally skilled as a figurist and character artist in the various paint mediums, Conté crayon, pastel, free-form sketch, etc.

In 1941, he returned to Minnesota and entered a piece of sculpture in the Minnesota State Fair sculpture competition, where he was awarded the first prize. The much-honored artist had won a painting prize at the fair a decade earlier as well, representing one of the earliest achievements by an African-American artist in that state's history.

Example Of Henry Bannarn Watercolor

He died on September 20, 1965, in Brooklyn, New York.

== Legacy ==
His works are represented in some of the most important collections in the US, such as the Metropolitan Museum of Art, the Smithsonian Institution, Dartmouth College's Hood Museum of Art, Pennsylvania Academy of the Fine Arts, Minnesota Historical Society, Minneapolis Institute of Art, Howard University Gallery of Art, and Clark Atlanta University Art Galleries. Very few Bannarn works exist in private hands.

At the April 26, 2007 sale conducted by Shannon's Fine Art Auctioneers, Milford, Connecticut, a Bannarn original oil titled "Modernist Exhibition" sold for $24,000 USD, achieving a price nearly ten times its pre-auction estimate of $2500–$3500. At a May 18, 2008, auction conducted by the Rose Hill Auction Gallery, Englewood, New Jersey, an oil on board painting by Bannarn entitled "Seagulls" sold for $5,750, almost twenty times its pre-auction estimate of $200–$300.

== Exhibitions ==
Minnesota State Fair 1928 (Award), Minneapolis Institute of Art 1932 (prize), Harmon Foundation 1933, PAFA 1934/36, American Negro Exhibition 1940, Minnesota Artists Association Annual 1940 (Award), Minnesota State Fair 1941 (Award), Atlanta University 1943 (Award), Hanley Gallery St. Paul, Minnesota 1945, Newton Gallery, 1945

== Selected collections ==
- Minneapolis Institute of Art, Minneapolis, MN

== See also ==
- Charles Alston- partner, Alston-Bannarn Workshop, Harlem Community Art Center
- Bror Julius Olsson Nordfeldt- instructor
- George Oberteuffer - teacher
- Samuel Chatwood Burton - teacher
- Jacob Lawrence - student of Bannarn at the Harlem Art Workshop.
- Henry Barnnarn at the Minneapolis Institute of Art, Minneapolis, MN
