= Great Migration (African American) =

Migration from Southern US from 1910 to 1970

- Part of the Nadir of American race relations
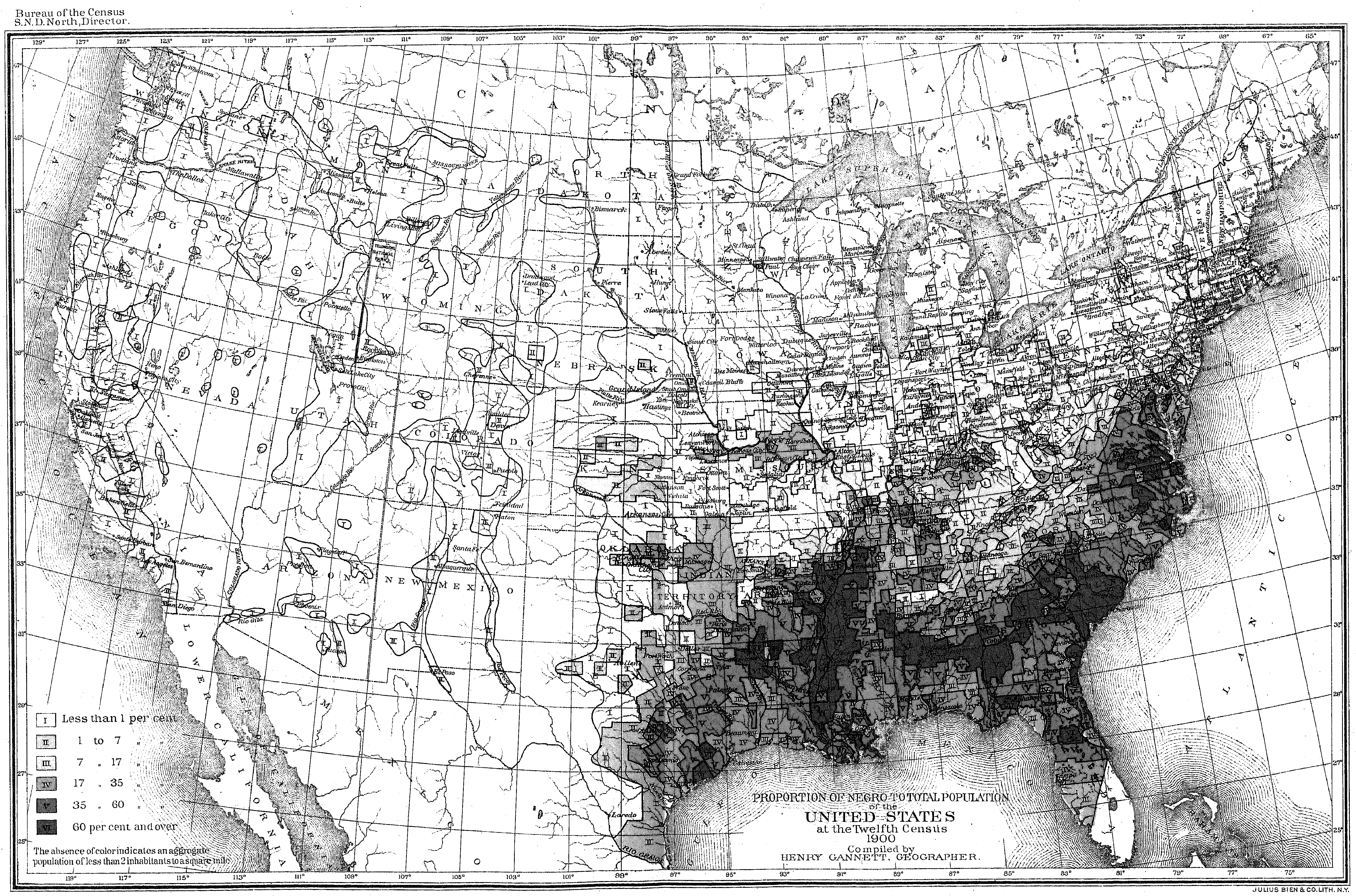
- United States map of the Black American population from the 1900 U.S. census
- Date: 1910s–1970
- Location: United States
- Also known as: Great Northward Migration; Black Migration
- Cause: Poor economic conditions More job opportunities in the North; Racial segregation in the United States: Jim Crow economy; Jim Crow laws; Lynching in the United States
- Participants: About 6,000,000 Black Americans
- Outcome: Demographic shifts across the U.S. Improved living conditions for Black Americans

The Great Migration, sometimes known as the Great Northward Migration or the Black Migration, was the movement of six million Black Americans out of the rural Southern United States to the urban Northeast, Midwest, and West between 1910 and 1970. It was substantially driven by poor economic and social conditions due to prevalent racial segregation and discrimination in the Southern states where Jim Crow laws were upheld. In particular, continued lynchings motivated a portion of the migrants, as Black Americans searched for social reprieve. The historic change brought by the migration was amplified because the migrants, for the most part, moved to the then-largest cities in the United States (New York City, Chicago, Los Angeles, San Francisco, Philadelphia, Detroit, Cleveland, and Washington, D.C.) at a time when those cities had a central cultural, social, political, and economic influence over the United States; there, Black Americans established culturally influential communities of their own.

From the earliest U.S. population statistics in 1780 until 1910, more than 90% of the Black-American population lived in the American South, making up the majority of the population in three Southern states: Louisiana (until about 1890), South Carolina (until the 1920s), and Mississippi (until the 1930s). But by the end of the Great Migration, just over half of the Black-American population lived in the South, while a little less than half lived in the North and West. Moreover, the Black-American population had become highly urbanized. In 1900, only one-fifth of Black Americans in the South were living in urban areas. By 1960, half of the Black Americans in the South lived in urban areas, and by 1970, more than 80% of Black Americans nationwide lived in cities. In 1991, Nicholas Lemann wrote:

The Great Migration was one of the largest and most rapid mass internal movements in history—perhaps the greatest not caused by the immediate threat of execution or starvation. In sheer numbers, it outranks the migration of any other ethnic group—Italians or Irish or Jews or Poles—to the United States. For Black people, the migration meant leaving what had always been their economic and social base in America and finding a new one.

Some historians analyze the Great Migration in two parts, a first Great Migration (1910–1940), during which about 1.6 million people moved from mostly rural areas in the South to northern industrial cities, and a Second Great Migration (1940–1970), which began after the Great Depression, during which at least five million people—including townspeople with urban skills—moved to the North and West.

Since the civil rights movement, the trend has reversed, with more Black Americans moving to the South, albeit far more slowly. Dubbed the New Great Migration, these moves were generally spurred by the economic difficulties of cities in the Northeastern and Midwestern United States, growth of jobs in the "New South" and its lower cost of living, family and kinship ties, and lessening discrimination.

== Causes ==
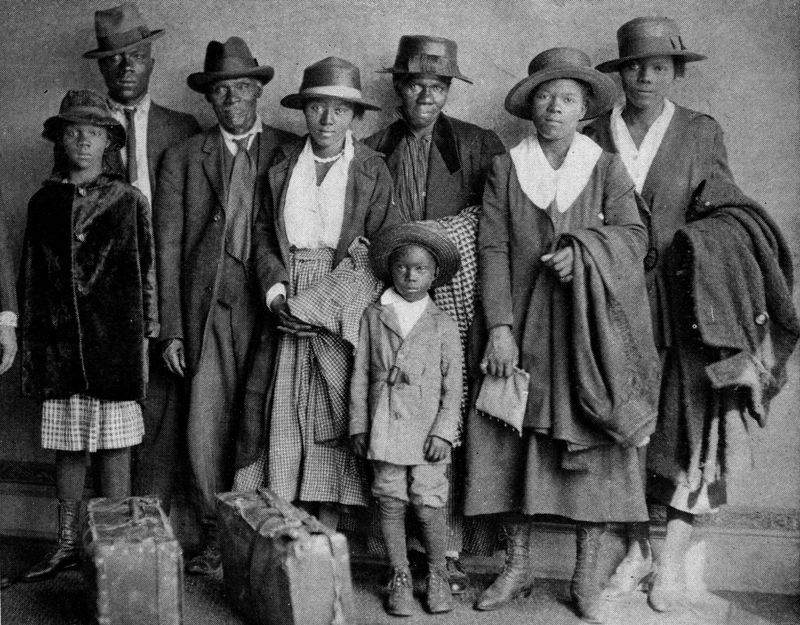
The Arthur family arrived at Chicago's Polk Street Depot on August 30, 1920, during the Great Migration.

The primary factors for migration among southern African Americans were segregation, indentured servitude, convict leasing, an increase in the spread of racist ideology, widespread lynching (nearly 3,500 African Americans were lynched between 1882 and 1968), and lack of social and economic opportunities in the South. The Southern sharecropping system, agricultural issues such as cotton boll weevil infestations, flooding, the South's pervasive exclusion of African Americans from political power and representation, and oppressive Jim Crow laws also motivated African Americans to migrate northward.

Some factors pulled migrants to the North, such as labor shortages in Northern factories brought about by World War I, resulting in thousands of vacancies in steel mills, railroads, meatpacking plants, and the automobile industry. Around 1.2 million European immigrants arrived during 1914 while only 300,000 arrived the next year. The enlistment of workers into the military also affected the labor supply. Labor agents were sent by Northern businesses to recruit Southern workers, and Northern companies offered special incentives to encourage Black workers to relocate, including free transportation and low-cost housing. Wages for Northern jobs could be more than twice those of Southern ones.

== First Great Migration (1910–1940) ==
When the Emancipation Proclamation was signed in 1863, less than 8% of the African-American population lived in the Northeastern or Midwestern United States. This began to change over the next decade to such an extent that a U.S. Senate committee ordered an investigation into the causes of the mass migration of Exodusters from the South during the preceding decade, especially to Kansas, where many sought refuge. In 1900, about 90% of Black Americans still lived in Southern states.

Between 1910 and 1930, the African-American population in Northern states increased by about 40% as a result of migration, mostly to major cities. Philadelphia, Detroit, Chicago, Cleveland, Baltimore, and New York City saw some of the biggest increases in the early part of the twentieth century. Tens of thousands of Black workers were recruited for industrial jobs, such as positions related to the expansion of the Pennsylvania Railroad. Cities which saw high levels of Black migration also attracted millions of European immigrants, and tensions formed between them as they competed for jobs and scarce housing.

James Gregory calculates decade-by-decade migration volumes in his book The Southern Diaspora. Black migration picked up from the start of the new century, with 204,000 leaving in the first decade. The pace accelerated with the outbreak of World War I and continued through the 1920s. By 1930, there were 1.3 million former southerners living in other regions.

=== Tensions and violence ===
With the migration of African Americans northward and the mixing of White and Black workers in factories, the tension was building, largely driven by White workers. The American Federation of Labor (AFL) advocated for separation between European and African Americans in the workplace. Though non-violent protests such as walk-outs occurred, building tensions soon erupted in violence.

In 1917, the East St. Louis riot, known as one of the bloodiest workplace riots, killed between 40 and 200 African Americans and displaced more than 6,000 from their homes. The National Association for the Advancement of Colored People (NAACP) responded to the violence with the Silent March. More than 10,000 African-American men and women demonstrated in Harlem, New York. Conflicts continued after World War I, and African-American labor activism continued.

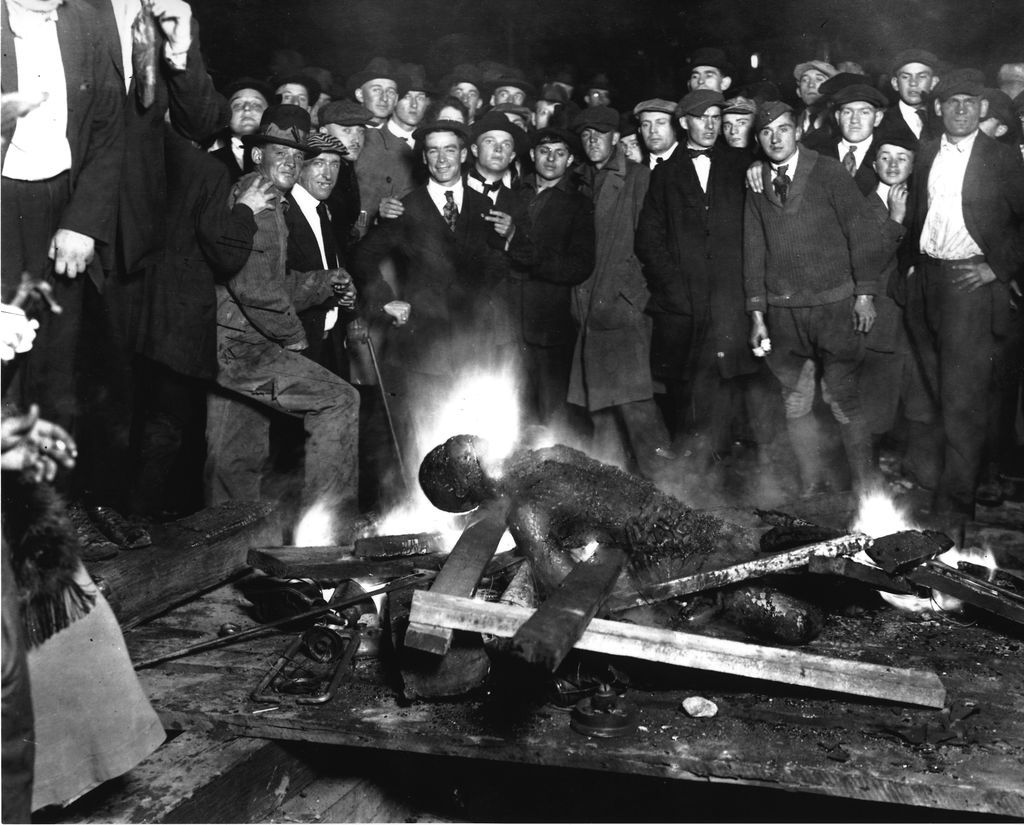
A group of White men pose for a photograph as they stand over the Black victim, Will Brown, who had been lynched and had his body mutilated and burned during the Omaha race riot of 1919 in Omaha, Nebraska.

The late summer and autumn of 1919 came to be known as the Red Summer, as violence and prolonged rioting between Black and White Americans plagued major U.S. cities. Cities affected by the violence included Washington D.C., Chicago, Omaha, Knoxville, Tennessee, and Elaine, Arkansas, a small rural town 70 miles (110 km) southwest of Memphis.

The race riots peaked in Chicago, with the most violence and death occurring there. The authors of The Negro in Chicago; a study of race relations and a race riot, an official report from 1922 on race relations in Chicago, came to the conclusion that there were many factors that led to the violent outbursts in Chicago. Principally, many Black workers had assumed the jobs of White men who went to go fight in World War I. As the war ended in 1918, many men returned home to find out their jobs had been taken by Black men who were willing to work for far less.

By the time the rioting and violence had subsided in Chicago, 38 people had lost their lives, with 500 more injured. Additionally, $250,000 worth of property was destroyed, and more than a thousand people were left homeless. In other cities across the nation many more had been affected by the violence of the Red Summer. The Red Summer enlightened many to the growing racial tension in America. The violence in these major cities prefaced the Harlem Renaissance, an African-American cultural revolution, in the 1920s. Racial violence appeared again in Chicago in the 1940s and in Detroit as well as other cities in the Northeast as racial tensions over housing and employment discrimination grew.

== Second Great Migration (mid 1940s–1970) ==
The Great Depression wiped out job opportunities in the northern industrial belt, especially for African Americans, and temporarily caused a sharp reduction in migration. In the 1930s and 1940s, increasing mechanization of agriculture virtually brought the institution of sharecropping that had existed since the Civil War to an end, causing many landless Black farmers to be forced off of the land. With the defense buildup for World War II and with the post-war economic prosperity, migration was revived, with larger numbers of Black Americans leaving the South through the 1960s.

This wave of migration often resulted in overcrowding of urban areas due to exclusionary housing policies meant to keep African-American families out of developing suburbs. For example, in the New York and northern New Jersey suburbs 67,000 mortgages were insured by the G.I. Bill, but fewer than 100 were taken out by non-whites.

Approximately 1.4 million Black southerners moved north or west in the 1940s, followed by 1.1 million in the 1950s, and another 2.4 million people in the 1960s and early 1970s. By the late 1970s, as deindustrialization and the Rust Belt crisis took hold, the Great Migration came to an end.

== Migration patterns ==
African American population distribution during the Great Migration

1910

1970

Big cities were the principal destinations of southerners throughout the two phases of the Great Migration. In the first phase, eight major cities attracted two-thirds of the migrants: New York and Chicago, followed in order by Philadelphia, St. Louis, Detroit, Kansas City, Pittsburgh, and Indianapolis. The Second great Black migration increased the populations of these cities while adding others as destinations, including the Western states. Western cities such as Los Angeles, San Francisco, Oakland, Phoenix, Denver, Seattle, and Portland also attracted African Americans in large numbers.

There were clear migratory patterns that linked particular states and cities in the South to corresponding destinations in the North and West. Almost half of those who migrated from Mississippi during the first Great Migration, for example, ended up in Chicago, while those from Virginia tended to move to Philadelphia. For the most part, these patterns were related to geography (i.e. longitude), with the closest cities attracting the most migrants (such as Los Angeles and San Francisco receiving a disproportionate number of migrants from Texas and Louisiana). When multiple destinations were equidistant, chain migration played a larger role, with migrants following the path set by those before them.

African Americans from the South also migrated to industrialized Southern cities, in addition to northward and westward to war-boom cities. There was an increase in Louisville's defense industries, making it a vital part of America's effort into World War II and Louisville's economy. Industries ranged from producing synthetic rubber, smokeless powders, artillery shells, and vehicle parts. Many industries also converted to creating products for the war effort, such as Ford Motor Company converting its plant to produce military jeeps. The company Hillerich & Bradsby initially made baseball bats and then converted their production into making gunstocks.

During the war, there was a shortage of workers in the defense industry. African Americans took the opportunity to fill in the industries' missing jobs during the war, around 4.3 million intrastate migration and 2.1 million interstate migration in the Southern states. The defense industry in Louisville reached a peak of roughly over 80,000 employment. At first, job availability was not open for African Americans, but the growing need for jobs in the defense industry and the Fair Employment Practices Committee sign by Franklin D. Roosevelt, the Southern industries began to accept African Americans into the workplace.

Migration patterns reflected network ties. Black Americans tended to go to locations in the North where other Black Americans had previously migrated. Per a 2021 study, "when one randomly chosen African American moved from a Southern birth town to a destination county, then 1.9 additional Black migrants made the same move on average."

=== Gallery ===
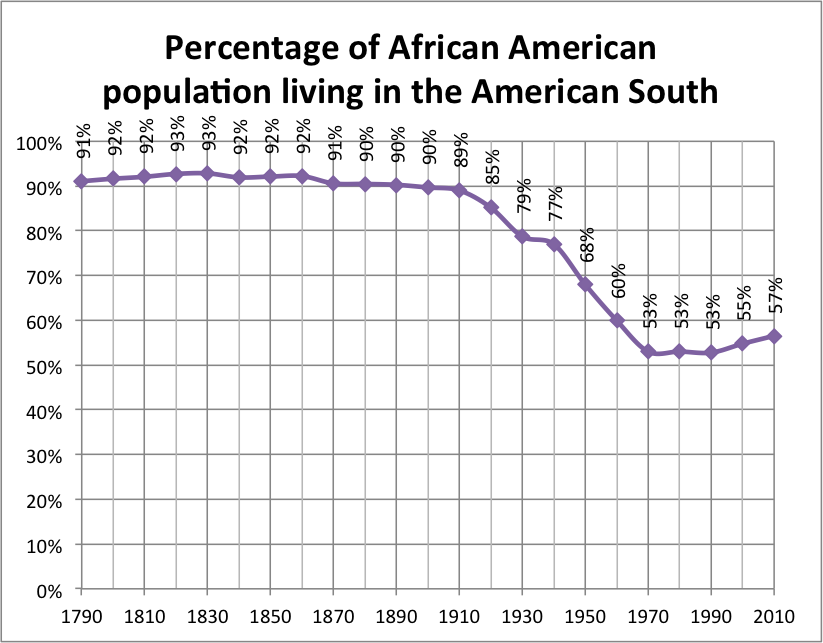
Graph showing the percentage of the African-American population living in the American South, 1790–2010

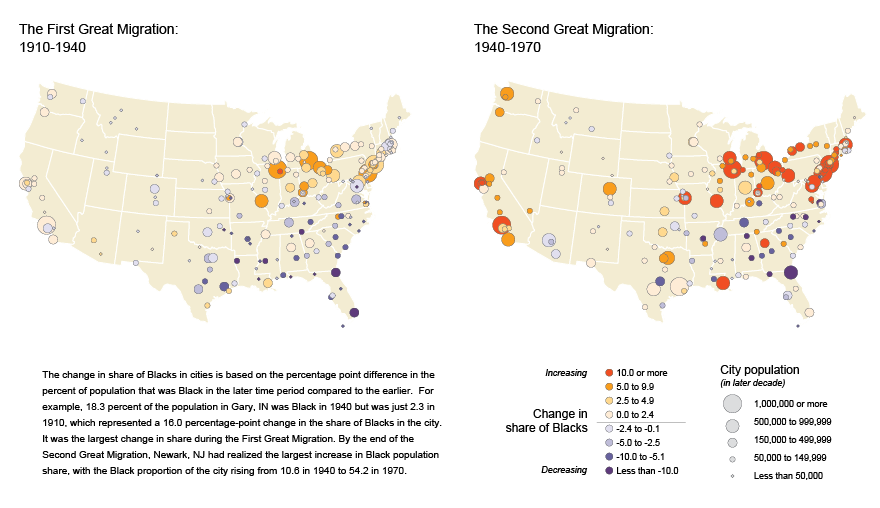
The Great Migration shown by changes in the African-American share of populations of major U.S. cities, 1910–40 and 1940–70

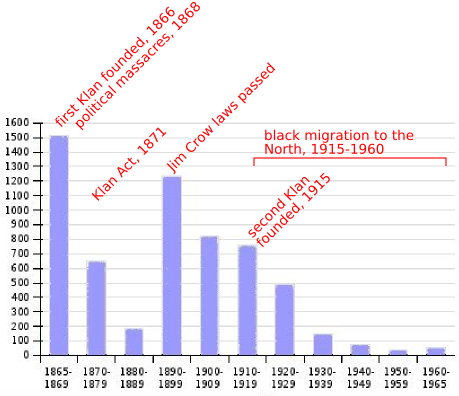
Racially motivated murders per decade from 1865 to 1965.

== Cultural changes ==
After moving from the environment of the South to the Northern states, African Americans were inspired to be creative in different ways. The Great Migration resulted in the Harlem Renaissance, which was also fueled by immigrants from the Caribbean, and the Chicago Black Renaissance. In her book The Warmth of Other Suns, Pulitzer Prize–winning journalist Isabel Wilkerson discusses the migration of "six million Black Southerners [moving] out of the terror of Jim Crow to an uncertain existence in the North and Midwest."

The struggle of African-American migrants to adapt to Northern cities was the subject of Jacob Lawrence's Migration Series of paintings, created when he was a young man in New York. Exhibited in 1941 at the Museum of Modern Art, Lawrence's Series attracted wide attention; he was quickly perceived as one of the most important African-American artists of the time.

The Great Migration had effects on music as well as other cultural subjects. Many blues singers migrated from the Mississippi Delta to Chicago to escape racial discrimination. Muddy Waters, Chester Burnett, and Buddy Guy are among the most well-known blues artists who migrated to Chicago. The Delta-born pianist Eddie Boyd told Living Blues magazine, "I thought of coming to Chicago where I could get away from some of that racism and where I would have an opportunity to, well, do something with my talent .... It wasn't peaches and cream [in Chicago], man, but it was a hell of a lot better than down there where I was born".

== Effects ==
=== Demographic changes ===
The Great Migration drained off much of the rural Black population of the South, and for a time, froze or reduced African-American population growth in parts of the region. The migration changed the demographics in a number of states; there were decades of Black population decline, especially across the Deep South "Black Belt" where cotton had been the main cash crop — but had been devastated by the arrival of the boll weevil. In 1910, African Americans constituted the majority of the population of South Carolina and Mississippi, and more than 40% in Georgia, Alabama, Louisiana and Texas; by 1970, only in Mississippi did the African-American population constitute more than 30% of the state's total. "The disappearance of the 'black belt' was one of the striking effects" of the Great Migration, James Gregory wrote.

In Mississippi, the Black American population decreased from about 56% of the population in 1910 to about 37% by 1970, remaining the majority only in some Delta counties. In Georgia, Black Americans decreased from about 45% of the population in 1910 to about 26% by 1970. In South Carolina, the Black population decreased from about 55% of the population in 1910 to about 30% by 1970.

The growing Black presence outside the South changed the dynamics and demographics of numerous cities in the Northeast, Midwest, and West. In 1900, only 740,000 African Americans lived outside the South, just 8% of the nation's total Black population. By 1970, more than 10.6 million African Americans lived outside the South, 47% of the nation's total.

Because the migrants concentrated in the big cities of the north and west, their influence was magnified in those places. Cities that had been virtually all white at the start of the century became centers of Black culture and politics by mid-century. Residential segregation and redlining led to concentrations of Black people in certain areas. The northern "Black metropolises" developed an important infrastructure of newspapers, businesses, jazz clubs, churches, and political organizations that provided the staging ground for new forms of racial politics and new forms of Black culture.

As a result of the Great Migration, the first large urban Black communities developed in northern cities beyond New York, Boston, Baltimore, Washington D.C., and Philadelphia, which had Black communities even before the Civil War, and attracted migrants after the war. It is conservatively estimated that 400,000 African Americans left the South in 1916 through 1918 to take advantage of a labor shortage in industrial cities during the First World War.

In 1910, the African-American population of Detroit was 6,000. The Great Migration, along with immigrants from southern and eastern Europe as well as their descendants, rapidly turned the city into the country's fourth-largest. By the start of the Great Depression in 1929, the city's African-American population had increased to 120,000.

In 1900–01, Chicago had a total population of 1,754,473. By 1920, the city had added more than 1 million residents. During the second wave of the Great Migration (1940–60), the African-American population in the city grew from 278,000 to 813,000.

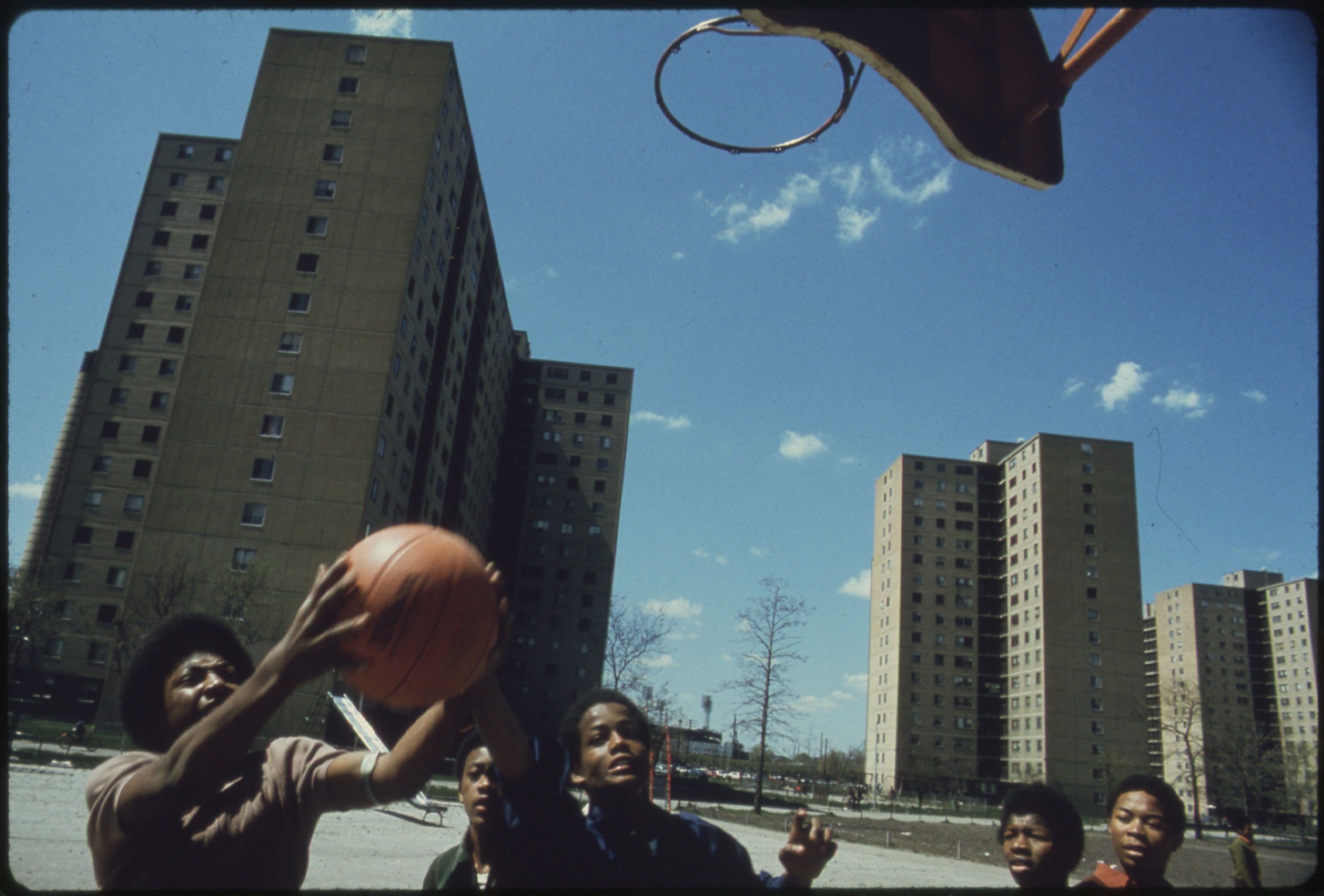
African-American youths play basketball in Chicago's Stateway Gardens high-rise housing project in 1973.

The flow of African Americans to Ohio, particularly to Cleveland, changed the demographics of the state and its primary industrial city. Before the Great Migration, an estimated 1.1% to 1.6% of Cleveland's population was African American. By 1920, 4.3% of Cleveland's population was African American. The number of African Americans in Cleveland continued to rise over the next 20 years of the Great Migration.

Other northeastern and midwestern industrial cities, such as Philadelphia, New York City, Baltimore, Pittsburgh, St. Louis, and Omaha, also had dramatic increases in their African-American populations. By the 1920s, New York's Harlem became a center of Black cultural life, influenced by the American migrants as well as new immigrants from the Caribbean area.

Second-tier industrial cities that were destinations for numerous Black migrants were Buffalo, Rochester, Boston, Milwaukee, Minneapolis, Kansas City, Columbus, Cincinnati, Grand Rapids and Indianapolis, and smaller industrial cities such as Chester, Gary, Dayton, Erie, Toledo, Youngstown, Peoria, Muskegon, Newark, Flint, Saginaw, New Haven, and Albany. People tended to take the cheapest rail ticket possible and go to areas where they had relatives and friends.

For example, many people from Mississippi moved directly north by train to Chicago, Milwaukee and St. Louis, from Alabama to Cleveland and Detroit, from Georgia and South Carolina to New York City, Baltimore, Washington D.C. and Philadelphia, and in the second migration, from Texas, Louisiana, and Mississippi to Oakland, Los Angeles, Portland, Phoenix, Denver, and Seattle.

=== Discrimination and working conditions ===
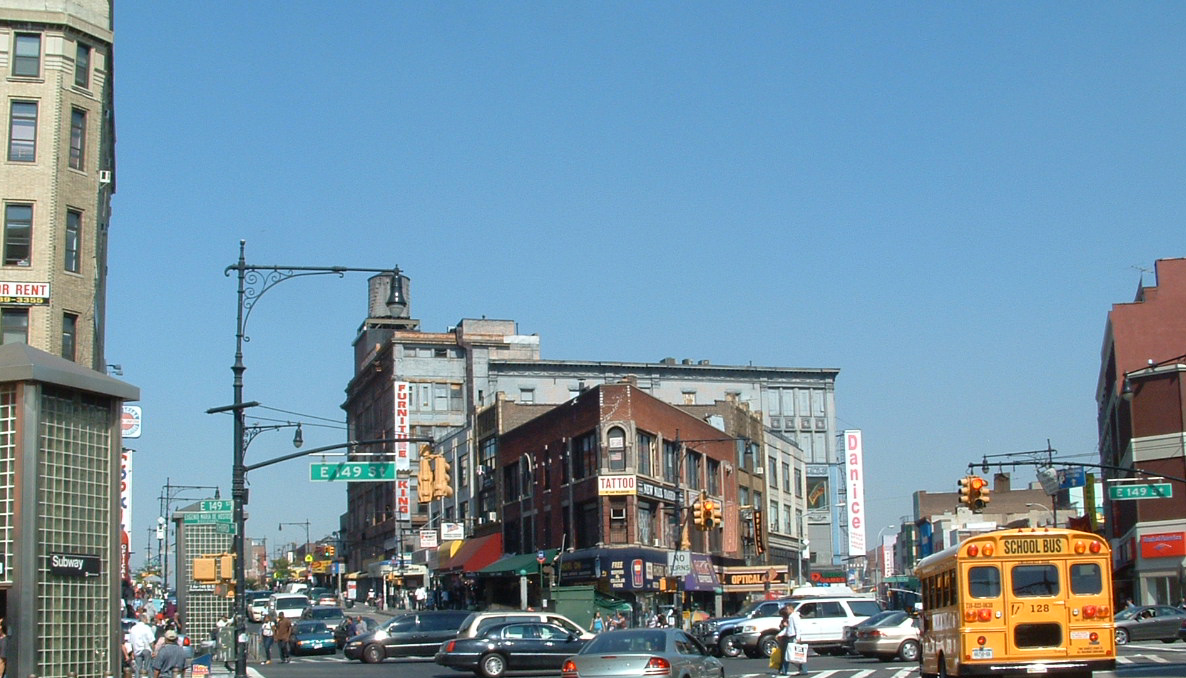
The Hub is the retail heart of the South Bronx, New York City.

Educated African Americans were better able to obtain jobs after the Great Migration, eventually gaining a measure of class mobility, but the migrants encountered significant forms of discrimination. Because so many people migrated in a short period of time, the African-American migrants were often resented by the urban European-American working class (many of whom were recent immigrants themselves); fearing their ability to negotiate rates of pay or secure employment, the ethnic Whites felt threatened by the influx of new labor competition. Sometimes those who were most fearful or resentful were the last immigrants of the 19th and new immigrants of the 20th century.

African Americans made substantial gains in industrial employment, particularly in the steel, automobile, shipbuilding, and meatpacking industries. Between 1910 and 1920, the number of Black workers employed in industry nearly doubled from 500,000 to 901,000. After the Great Depression, more advances took place after workers in the steel and meatpacking industries organized into labor unions in the 1930s and 1940s, under the interracial Congress of Industrial Organizations (CIO). The unions ended the segregation of many jobs, and African Americans began to advance into more skilled jobs and supervisory positions previously informally reserved for Whites.

Between 1940 and 1960, the number of Black people in managerial and administrative occupations doubled, along with the number of Black people in white-collar occupations, while the number of Black agricultural workers in 1960 fell to one-fourth of what it was in 1940. Also, between 1936 and 1959, Black income relative to White income more than doubled in various skilled trades. Despite employment discrimination, Black people had higher labor force participation rates than Whites in every U.S. Census from 1890 to 1950. As a result of these advancements, the percentage of Black families living below the poverty line declined from 87% in 1940 to 47% by 1960 and to 30% by 1970.

Populations increased so rapidly among both African-American migrants and new European immigrants that there were housing shortages in most major cities. With fewer resources, the newer groups were forced to compete for the oldest, most run-down housing. Ethnic groups created territories which they defended against change. Discrimination often restricted African Americans to crowded neighborhoods. The more established populations of cities tended to move to newer housing as it was developing in the outskirts. Mortgage discrimination and redlining in inner city areas limited the newer African-American migrants' ability to determine their own housing, or obtain a fair price. In the long term, the National Housing Act of 1934 contributed to limiting the availability of loans to urban areas, particularly those areas inhabited by African Americans.

Migrants going to Albany, New York, found poor living conditions and employment opportunities, but also higher wages and better schools and social services. Local organizations such as the Albany Inter-Racial Council and churches, helped them, but de facto segregation and discrimination remained well into the late 20th century.

Migrants going to Pittsburgh and surrounding mill towns in western Pennsylvania between 1890 and 1930 faced racial discrimination and limited economic opportunities. The Black population in Pittsburgh jumped from 6,000 in 1880 to 27,000 in 1910. Many took highly paid, skilled jobs in the steel mills. Pittsburgh's Black population increased to 37,700 in 1920 (6.4% of the total) while the Black element in Homestead, Rankin, Braddock, and others nearly doubled. They succeeded in building effective community responses that enabled the survival of new communities. Historian Joe Trotter explains the decision process:

Although African-Americans often expressed their views of the Great Migration in biblical terms and received encouragement from northern Black newspapers, railroad companies, and industrial labor agents, they also drew upon family and friendship networks to help in the move to Western Pennsylvania. They formed migration clubs, pooled their money, bought tickets at reduced rates, and often moved in groups. Before they made the decision to move, they gathered information and debated the pros and cons of the process .... In barbershops, poolrooms, and grocery stores, in churches, lodge halls, and clubhouses, and in private homes, Black people who lived in the South discussed, debated, and decided what was good and what was bad about moving to the urban North.

=== Integration and segregation ===
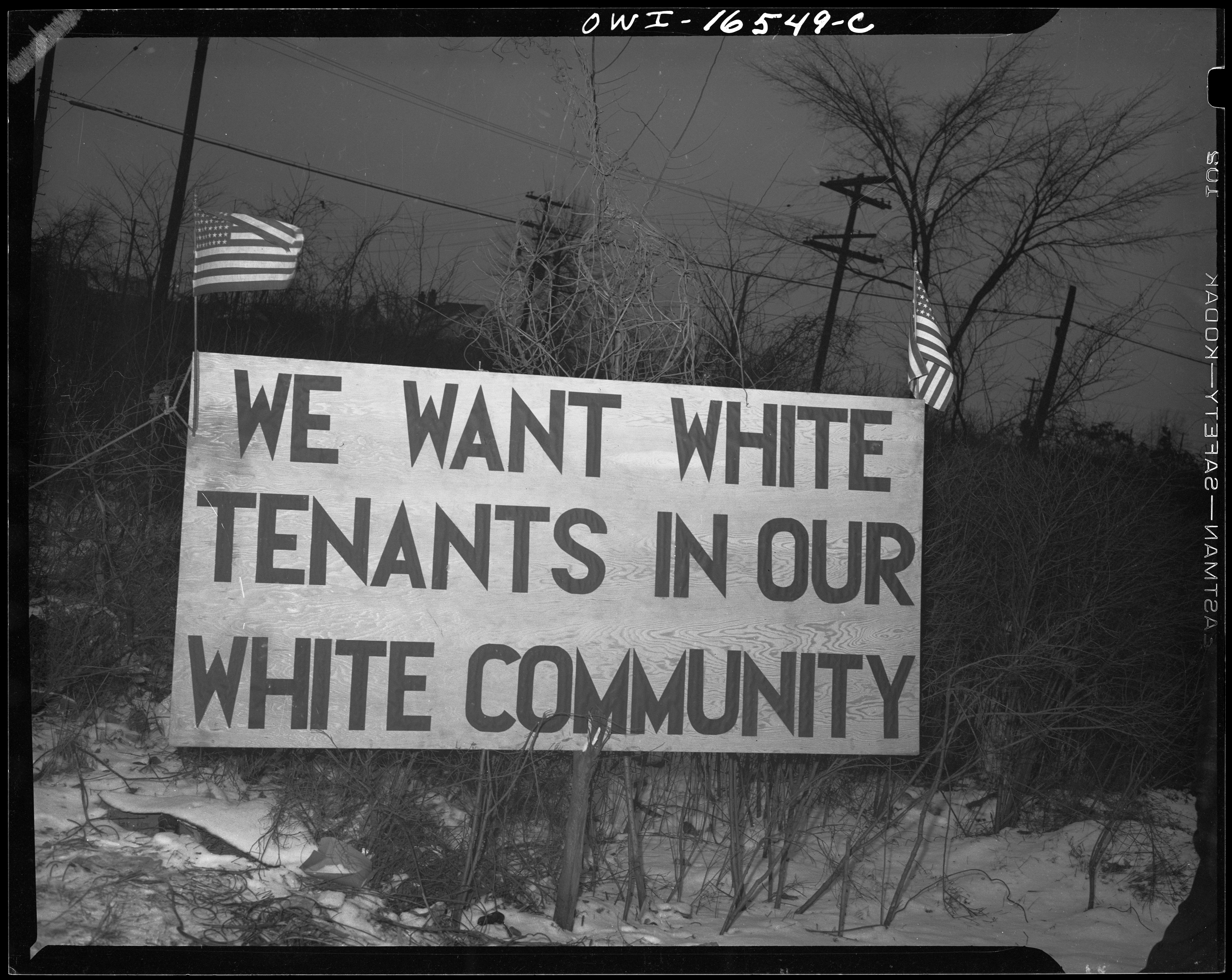
White tenants seeking to prevent Black people from moving into the Sojourner Truth Project in Detroit erected this sign, 1942. Photograph by Arthur Siegel.

In cities such as Newark, New York and Chicago, African Americans became increasingly integrated into society. As they lived and worked more closely with European Americans, the divide became increasingly indefinite. This period marked the transition for many African Americans from lifestyles as rural farmers to urban industrial workers.

This migration gave birth to a cultural boom in cities such as Chicago and New York. In Chicago for instance, the neighborhood of Bronzeville became known as the "Black Metropolis". From 1924 to 1929, the "Black Metropolis" was at the peak of its golden years. Many of the community's entrepreneurs were Black during this period. "The foundation of the first African American YMCA took place in Bronzeville, and worked to help incoming migrants find jobs in the city of Chicago."

The "Black Belt" geographical and racial isolation of this community, bordered to the north and east by Whites, and to the south and west by industrial sites and ethnic immigrant neighborhoods, made it a site for the study of the development of an urban Black community. For urbanized people, eating proper foods in a sanitary, civilized setting such as the home or a restaurant was a social ritual that indicated one's level of respectability. The people native to Chicago had pride in the high level of integration in Chicago restaurants, which they attributed to their unassailable manners and refined tastes.

Since African-American migrants retained many Southern cultural and linguistic traits, such cultural differences created a sense of "otherness" in terms of their reception by others who were already living in the cities. Stereotypes ascribed to Black people during this period and ensuing generations often derived from African-American migrants' rural cultural traditions, which were maintained in stark contrast to the urban environments in which the people resided.

Locals started building Black-owned establishments like bars, hotels, and churches. The Bethel African Methodist Episcopal Church was one of these establishments. Soloman and Cordelia Johnson founded the Bethel African Methodist Episcopal Church in the late 1890s. Black locals were able to freely express their religious beliefs in this church, which developed into a cultural center. The Hotel Robinson was another popular institution. It was established by Albert and Margaret Robinson after gaining their freedom from slavery. They built and opened The Hotel Robinson in Julian in 1887. This hotel is still currently active and is now known as the Julian Hotel. It's the first Black-owned business in San Diego and the oldest operating hotel in Southern California.

== White southern reaction ==
The beginning of the Great Migration exposed a paradox in race relations in the American South at that time. Although Black people were treated with extreme hostility and subjected to legal discrimination, the southern economy was deeply dependent on them as an abundant supply of cheap labor, and Black workers were seen as the most critical factor in the economic development of the South. One South Carolina politician summed up the dilemma: "Politically speaking, there are far too many negroes, but from an industrial standpoint there is room for many more."

When the Great Migration started in the 1910s, White southern elites seemed to be unconcerned, and industrialists and cotton planters saw it as a positive, as it was siphoning off surplus industrial and agricultural labor. As the migration picked up, however, southern elites began to panic, fearing that a prolonged Black exodus would bankrupt the South, and newspaper editorials warned of the danger. White employers eventually took notice and began expressing their fears. White southerners soon began trying to stem the flow in order to prevent the hemorrhaging of their labor supply, and some even began attempting to address the poor living standards and racial oppression experienced by Southern Black people in order to induce them to stay.

As a result, southern employers increased their wages to match those on offer in the North, and some individual employers even opposed the worst excesses of Jim Crow laws. When the measures failed to stem the tide, White southerners, in concert with federal officials who feared the rise of Black nationalism, co-operated in attempting to coerce Black people to stay in the South. The Southern Metal Trades Association urged decisive action to stop Black migration, and some employers undertook serious efforts against it.

The largest southern steel manufacturer refused to cash checks sent to finance Black migration, efforts were made to restrict bus and train access for Black Americans, agents were stationed in northern cities to report on wage levels, unionization, and the rise of Black nationalism, and newspapers were pressured to divert more coverage to negative aspects of Black life in the North. A series of local and federal directives were put into place with the goal of restricting Black mobility, including local vagrancy ordinances, "work or fight" laws demanding all males either be employed or serve in the army, and conscription orders. Intimidation and beatings were also used to terrorize Black people into staying. These intimidation tactics were described by Secretary of Labor William B. Wilson as interfering with "the natural right of workers to move from place to place at their own discretion".

During the wave of migration that took place in the 1940s, White southerners were less concerned, as mechanization of agriculture in the late 1930s had resulted in another labor surplus so southern planters put up less resistance.

Black Americans were not the only group to leave the South for Northern industrial opportunities. Large numbers of Poor Whites from Appalachia and the Upland South made the journey to the Midwest and Northeast after World War II, a phenomenon known as the Hillbilly Highway.

== The Chicago Defender ==
The Chicago Defender played a big role in encouraging African Americans to leave the South during The Great Migration. The newspaper published blazing headlines and powerful cartoons to influence Black southerners to move North in order to capitalize on better jobs and opportunities. The paper consistently referred to the North as a "promised land". The Defender was a primarily black newspaper that highlighted issues of racism and discrimination along with black social and economic progress.

The newspaper not only provided encouragement to migrating black Americans but also provided job listings and train schedules. In addition to these resources, The Chicago Defender informed migrants that churches or organizations, such as the Bethlehem Baptist Association in Chicago, Illinois, could assist them with finding housing and employment, and adjusting to their new environment. As part of its efforts to encourge migration, the newspaper designated May 15, 1917 as the "Great Northern Drive" to establish a movement where at least 110,000 African Americans migrated to Chicago alone. The paper also served as a voice for racial justice campaigning for anti-lynching legislation and by publishing writing from writers such as Langston Hughes and Gwendolyn Brooks. The Defender acted as a community building block for newly migrated African Americans by unleashing new social, political, and religious movements. Many black Americans who migrated to Chicago viewed the Defender as a trusted guide that looked out for their best interests.

== In popular culture ==
The Great Migration is a backdrop of the 2013 film The Butler, as the Forest Whitaker character Cecil Gaines moves from a plantation in Georgia to become a butler at the White House. The Great Migration also served as part of August Wilson's inspiration for The Piano Lesson. The opera safronia (composer and librettist: avery r. young) had its world premiere at the Lyric Opera of Chicago in April 2026 and is based loosely on young's family's experience in the Great Migration.

== Statistics ==
African Americans as a Percentage of the Total Population By U.S. Region (1900–1980)
Region	1900	1910	1920	1930	1940	1950	1960	1970	1980	Change in the Black Percentage of the Total Population Between 1900 and 1980
United States	11.6%	10.7%	9.9%	9.7%	9.8%	10.0%	10.5%	11.1%	11.7%	+0.1%
Northeast	1.8%	1.9%	2.3%	3.3%	3.8%	5.1%	6.8%	8.9%	9.9%	+8.1%
Midwest	1.9%	1.8%	2.3%	3.3%	3.5%	5.0%	6.7%	8.1%	9.1%	+7.2%
South	32.3%	29.8%	26.9%	24.7%	23.8%	21.7%	20.6%	19.1%	18.6%	-13.7%
West	0.7%	0.7%	0.9%	1.0%	1.2%	2.9%	3.9%	4.9%	5.2%	+4.5%

African Americans as a Percentage of the Total Population By U.S. State (1900–1980)
State	Region	1900	1910	1920	1930	1940	1950	1960	1970	1980	Change in the Black Percentage of the Total Population Between 1900 and 1980
United States	N/A	11.6%	10.7%	9.9%	9.7%	9.8%	10.0%	10.5%	11.1%	11.7%	+0.1%
Alabama	South	45.2%	42.5%	38.4%	35.7%	34.7%	32.0%	30.0%	26.2%	25.6%	-19.6%
Alaska	West	0.3%	0.3%	0.2%	0.2%	0.2%		3.0%	3.0%	3.4%	+3.1%
Arizona	West	1.5%	1.0%	2.4%	2.5%	3.0%	3.5%	3.3%	3.0%	2.8%	+1.3%
Arkansas	South	28.0%	28.1%	27.0%	25.8%	24.8%	22.3%	21.8%	18.3%	16.3%	-11.2%
California	West	0.7%	0.9%	1.1%	1.4%	1.8%	4.4%	5.6%	7.0%	7.7%	+6.0%
Colorado	West	1.6%	1.4%	1.2%	1.1%	1.1%	1.5%	2.3%	3.0%	3.5%	+1.9%
Connecticut	Northeast	1.7%	1.4%	1.5%	1.8%	1.9%	2.7%	4.2%	6.0%	7.0%	+6.3%
Delaware	South	16.6%	15.4%	13.6%	13.7%	13.5%	13.7%	13.6%	14.3%	16.1%	-0.5%
District of Columbia	South	31.1%	28.5%	25.1%	27.1%	28.2%	35.0%	53.9%	71.1%	70.3%	+38.2%
Florida	South	43.7%	41.0%	34.0%	29.4%	27.1%	21.8%	17.8%	15.3%	13.8%	-29.9%
Georgia	South	46.7%	45.1%	41.7%	36.8%	34.7%	30.9%	28.5%	25.9%	26.8%	-16.2%
Hawaii	West	0.2%	0.4%	0.1%	0.2%	0.1%	0.5%	0.8%	1.0%	1.8%	+1.6%
Idaho	West	0.2%	0.2%	0.2%	0.2%	0.1%	0.2%	0.2%	0.3%	0.3%	+0.1%
Illinois	Midwest	1.8%	1.9%	2.8%	4.3%	4.9%	7.4%	10.3%	12.8%	14.7%	+12.9%
Indiana	Midwest	2.3%	2.2%	2.8%	3.5%	3.6%	4.4%	5.8%	6.9%	7.6%	+5.3%
Iowa	Midwest	0.6%	0.7%	0.8%	0.7%	0.7%	0.8%	0.9%	1.2%	1.4%	+1.2%
Kansas	Midwest	3.5%	3.2%	3.3%	3.5%	3.6%	3.8%	4.2%	4.8%	5.3%	+1.8%
Kentucky	South	13.3%	11.4%	9.8%	8.6%	7.5%	6.9%	7.1%	7.2%	7.1%	-6.2%
Louisiana	South	47.1%	43.1%	38.9%	36.9%	35.9%	32.9%	31.9%	29.8%	29.4%	-17.7%
Maine	Northeast	0.2%	0.2%	0.2%	0.1%	0.2%	0.1%	0.3%	0.3%	0.3%	+0.1%
Maryland	South	19.8%	17.9%	16.9%	16.9%	16.6%	16.5%	16.7%	17.8%	22.7%	+2.9%
Massachusetts	Northeast	1.1%	1.1%	1.2%	1.2%	1.3%	1.6%	2.2%	3.1%	3.9%	+2.8%
Michigan	Midwest	0.7%	0.6%	1.6%	3.5%	4.0%	6.9%	9.2%	11.2%	12.9%	+12.2%
Minnesota	Midwest	0.3%	0.3%	0.4%	0.4%	0.4%	0.5%	0.7%	0.9%	1.3%	+1.0%
Mississippi	South	58.5%	56.2%	52.2%	50.2%	49.2%	45.3%	42.0%	36.8%	35.2%	-23.3%
Missouri	Midwest	5.2%	4.8%	5.2%	6.2%	6.5%	7.5%	9.0%	10.3%	10.5%	+5.3%
Montana	West	0.6%	0.2%	0.3%	0.2%	0.2%	0.2%	0.2%	0.3%	0.2%	-0.4%
Nebraska	Midwest	0.6%	0.6%	1.0%	1.0%	1.1%	1.5%	2.1%	2.7%	3.1%	+2.5%
Nevada	West	0.3%	0.6%	0.4%	0.6%	0.6%	2.7%	4.7%	5.7%	6.4%	+6.1%
New Hampshire	Northeast	0.2%	0.1%	0.1%	0.2%	0.1%	0.1%	0.3%	0.3%	0.4%	+0.2%
New Jersey	Northeast	3.7%	3.5%	3.7%	5.2%	5.5%	6.6%	8.5%	10.7%	12.6%	+9.9%
New Mexico	West	0.8%	0.5%	1.6%	0.7%	0.9%	1.2%	1.8%	1.9%	1.8%	+1.0%
New York	Northeast	1.4%	1.5%	1.9%	3.3%	4.2%	6.2%	8.4%	11.9%	13.7%	+12.3%
North Carolina	South	33.0%	31.6%	29.8%	29.0%	27.5%	25.8%	24.5%	22.2%	22.4%	-10.6%
North Dakota	West	0.1%	0.1%	0.1%	0.1%	0.0%	0.0%	0.1%	0.4%	0.4%	+0.3%
Ohio	Midwest	2.3%	2.3%	3.2%	4.7%	4.9%	6.5%	8.1%	9.1%	10.0%	+7.7%
Oklahoma	South	7.0%	8.3%	7.4%	7.2%	7.2%	6.5%	6.6%	6.7%	6.8%	-0.2%
Oregon	West	0.3%	0.2%	0.3%	0.2%	0.2%	0.8%	1.0%	1.3%	1.4%	+1.1%
Pennsylvania	Northeast	2.5%	2.5%	3.3%	4.5%	4.7%	6.1%	7.5%	8.6%	8.8%	+6.3%
Rhode Island	Northeast	2.1%	1.8%	1.7%	1.4%	1.5%	1.8%	2.1%	2.7%	2.9%	+0.8%
South Carolina	South	58.4%	55.2%	51.4%	45.6%	42.9%	38.8%	34.8%	30.5%	30.4%	-28.0%
South Dakota	West	0.1%	0.1%	0.1%	0.1%	0.1%	0.1%	0.2%	0.2%	0.3%	+0.2%
Tennessee	South	23.8%	21.7%	19.3%	18.3%	17.4%	16.1%	16.5%	15.8%	15.8%	-8.0%
Texas	South	20.4%	17.7%	15.9%	14.7%	14.4%	12.7%	12.4%	12.5%	12.0%	-8.0%
Utah	West	0.2%	0.3%	0.3%	0.2%	0.2%	0.4%	0.5%	0.6%	0.6%	+0.4%
Vermont	Northeast	0.2%	0.5%	0.2%	0.2%	0.1%	0.1%	0.1%	0.2%	0.2%	+0.0%
Virginia	South	35.6%	32.6%	29.9%	26.8%	24.7%	22.1%	20.6%	18.5%	18.9%	-16.7%
Washington	West	0.5%	0.5%	0.5%	0.4%	0.4%	1.3%	1.7%	2.1%	2.6%	+2.1%
West Virginia	South	4.5%	5.3%	5.9%	6.6%	6.2%	5.7%	4.8%	3.9%	3.3%	-1.2%
Wisconsin	Midwest	0.1%	0.1%	0.2%	0.4%	0.4%	0.8%	1.9%	2.9%	3.9%	+3.8%
Wyoming	West	1.0%	1.5%	0.7%	0.6%	0.4%	0.9%	0.7%	0.8%	0.7%	-0.3%

African Americans as a Percentage of the Population By Large U.S. Cities (Those With a Peak Population of 500,000 or More by 1990) Outside of the Former Confederacy
City	1900	1910	1920	1930	1940	1950	1960	1970	1980	1990	Change in the Black Percentage of the Total Population Between 1900 and 1990
Phoenix, Arizona	2.7%	2.9%	3.7%	4.9%	6.5%	4.9%	4.8%	4.8%	4.8%	5.2%	+2.5%
Los Angeles, California	2.1%	2.4%	2.7%	3.1%	4.2%	8.7%	13.5%	17.9%	17.0%	14.0%	+11.9%
San Diego, California	1.8%	1.5%	1.3%	1.8%	2.0%	4.5%	6.0%	7.6%	8.9%	9.4%	+7.6%
San Francisco, California	0.5%	0.4%	0.5%	0.6%	0.8%	5.6%	10.0%	13.4%	12.7%	10.9%	+10.4%
San Jose, California	1.0%	0.6%	0.5%	0.4%	0.4%	0.6%	1.0%	2.5%	4.6%	4.7%	+3.7%
Denver, Colorado	2.9%	2.5%	2.4%	2.5%	2.4%	3.6%	6.1%	9.1%	12.0%	12.8%	+9.9%
Washington, District of Columbia	31.1%	28.5%	25.1%	27.1%	28.2%	35.0%	53.9%	71.1%	70.3%	65.8%	+34.7%
Chicago, Illinois	1.8%	2.0%	4.1%	6.9%	8.2%	13.6%	22.9%	32.7%	39.8%	39.1%	+37.3%
Indianapolis, Indiana	9.4%	9.3%	11.0%	12.1%	13.2%	15.0%	20.6%	18.0%	21.8%	22.6%	+13.2%
Baltimore, Maryland	15.6%	15.2%	14.8%	17.7%	19.3%	23.7%	34.7%	46.4%	54.8%	59.2%	+43.6%
Boston, Massachusetts	2.1%	2.0%	2.2%	2.6%	3.1%	5.0%	9.1%	16.3%	22.4%	25.6%	+23.5%
Detroit, Michigan	1.4%	1.2%	4.1%	7.7%	9.2%	16.2%	28.9%	43.7%	63.1%	75.7%	+74.3%
Minneapolis, Minnesota	0.8%	0.9%	1.0%	0.9%	0.9%	1.3%	2.4%	4.4%	7.7%	13.0%	+12.2%
Kansas City, Missouri	10.7%	9.5%	9.5%	9.6%	10.4%	12.2%	17.5%	22.1%	27.4%	29.6%	+18.9%
St. Louis, Missouri	6.2%	6.4%	9.0%	11.4%	13.3%	17.9%	28.6%	40.9%	45.6%	47.5%	+41.3%
Buffalo, New York	0.5%	0.4%	0.9%	2.4%	3.1%	6.3%	13.3%	20.4%	26.6%	30.7%	+30.2%
New York, New York	1.8%	1.9%	2.7%	4.7%	6.1%	9.5%	14.0%	21.1%	25.2%	28.7%	+26.9%
Cincinnati, Ohio	4.4%	5.4%	7.5%	10.6%	12.2%	15.5%	21.6%	27.6%	33.8%	37.9%	+33.5%
Cleveland, Ohio	1.6%	1.5%	4.3%	8.0%	9.6%	16.2%	28.6%	38.3%	43.8%	46.6%	+45.0%
Columbus, Ohio	6.5%	7.0%	9.4%	11.3%	11.7%	12.4%	16.4%	18.5%	22.1%	22.6%	+16.1%
Philadelphia, Pennsylvania	4.8%	5.5%	7.4%	11.3%	13.0%	18.2%	26.4%	33.6%	37.8%	39.9%	+35.1%
Pittsburgh, Pennsylvania	5.3%	4.8%	6.4%	8.2%	9.3%	12.2%	16.7%	20.2%	24.0%	25.8%	+20.5%
Seattle, Washington	0.5%	1.0%	0.9%	0.9%	1.0%	3.4%	4.8%	7.1%	9.5%	10.1%	+9.6%
Milwaukee, Wisconsin	0.3%	0.3%	0.5%	1.3%	1.5%	3.4%	8.4%	14.7%	23.1%	30.5%	+30.2%

African Americans as a Percentage of the Population By Large U.S. Cities (Those With a Peak Population of 500,000 or More by 1990) Inside the Former Confederacy
City	1900	1910	1920	1930	1940	1950	1960	1970	1980	1990	Change in the Black Percentage of the Total Population Between 1900 and 1990
Jacksonville, Florida	57.1%	50.8%	45.3%	37.2%	35.7%	35.4%	41.1%	22.3%	25.4%	25.2%	-31.9%
New Orleans, Louisiana	27.1%	26.3%	26.1%	28.3%	30.1%	31.9%	37.2%	45.0%	55.3%	61.9%	+34.8%
Memphis, Tennessee	48.8%	40.0%	37.7%	38.1%	41.5%	37.2%	37.0%	38.9%	47.6%	54.8%	+6.0%
Dallas, Texas	21.2%	19.6%	15.1%	14.9%	17.1%	13.1%	19.0%	24.9%	29.4%	29.5%	+8.3%
El Paso, Texas	2.9%	3.7%	1.7%	1.8%	2.3%	2.4%	2.1%	2.3%	3.2%	3.4%	+0.5%
Houston, Texas	32.7%	30.4%	24.6%	21.7%	22.4%	20.9%	22.9%	25.7%	27.6%	28.1%	-4.6%
San Antonio, Texas	14.1%	11.1%	8.9%	7.8%	7.6%	7.0%	7.1%	7.6%	7.3%	7.0%	-7.1%

A map of the black percentage of the U.S. population by each state/territory in 1900.
Black = 35.0+%
Brown = 20.0–34.9%
Red = 10.0–19.9%
Orange = 5.0–9.9%
Light orange = 1.0–4.9%
Gray = 0.9% or less
Magenta = No data available

A map of the black percentage of the U.S. population by each state/territory in 1990.
Black = 35.0+%
Brown = 20.0–34.9%
Red = 10.0–19.9%
Orange = 5.0–9.9%
Light orange = 1.0–4.9%
Gray = 0.9% or less
Pink = No data available

A map showing the change in the total Black population (in percent) between 1900 and 1990 by U.S. state.
Light purple = Population decline
Very light green = Population growth of 0.1–9.9%
Light green = Population growth of 10.0–99.9%
Green = Population growth of 100.0–999.9%
Dark green = Population growth of 1,000.0–9,999.9%
Very dark green (or Black) = Population growth of 10,000.0% or more
Gray = No data available

== New Great Migration ==
After the political and civil gains of the civil rights movement, in the 1970s, migration began to increase again. It moved in a different direction, as Black people who were searching for economic opportunity traveled to new regions of the South.

The New Great Migration is not evenly distributed throughout the South. As with the earlier Great Migration, the New Great Migration is primarily directed toward cities and large urban areas, such as Atlanta, Charlotte, Houston, Dallas, Raleigh, Washington, D.C., Tampa, Virginia Beach, San Antonio, Memphis, Orlando, Nashville, Jacksonville, and so forth. North Carolina's Charlotte metro area in particular, is a hot spot for African-American migrants in the US. Between 1975 and 1980, Charlotte saw a net gain of 2,725 African Americans in the area. This number continued to rise as between 1985 and 1990 as the area had a net gain of 7,497 African Americans, and from 1995 to 2000 the net gain was 23,313 African Americans. This rise in net gain points to Atlanta, Charlotte, Dallas, and Houston being a growing hot spots for the migrants of The New Great Migration. The percentage of Black Americans who live in the South has been increasing since 1990, and the biggest gains have been in the region's large urban areas, according to census data. The Black population of metro Atlanta more than doubled between 1990 and 2020, surpassing 2 million in the most recent census. The Black population also more than doubled in metro Charlotte while Greater Houston and Dallas-Fort Worth both saw their Black populations surpass 1 million for the first time. Several smaller metro areas also saw sizable gains, including San Antonio; Raleigh and Greensboro, N.C.; and Orlando. Primary destinations are states that have the most job opportunities, especially Georgia, North Carolina, Maryland, Virginia, Tennessee, Florida and Texas. Other southern states, including Mississippi, Louisiana, South Carolina, Alabama and Arkansas, have seen little net growth in the African-American population from return migration.

== See also ==
- African-American history
- Exodusters
- Black homesteaders
- Go Tell It on the Mountain (novel)
- Hillbilly Highway
- Historical racial and ethnic demographics of the United States
- History of African Americans in Chicago
- Living for the City
- The Migration Series
- White backlash#United States
- White flight#United States
