= Anthony Serianni =

American biochemistry professor (born 1953)

Anthony Stephen Serianni
- Born: November 18, 1953 (age 72)
- Education: BS., Biochemistry; PhD., Biochemistry; Postdoctoral research., Biochemistry, Molecular and Cell Biology
- Alma mater: Albright College; Michigan State University; Cornell University
- Occupations: Biochemist, academic and entrepreneur
- Scientific career
- Institutions: University of Notre Dame; Omicron Biochemicals

Anthony Stephen Serianni (born November 18, 1953) is an American biochemist, university professor and entrepreneur. He is professor of Chemistry and Biochemistry at the University of Notre Dame, and President and CEO of Omicron Biochemicals.

Serianni's academic research focuses on carbohydrate and nucleoside chemistry and biochemistry, catalysis in chemical and enzymatic systems, conformational equilibria and dynamics using NMR and computational methods, stable isotope labeling of biologically important compounds, and NMR-based studies of chemical reaction mechanisms. He received Michigan State University's John A. Boezi Memorial Alumnus Award in 2001, University of Notre Dame's Kaneb Teaching Award in 2003, and American Chemical Society's Horace S. Isbell Award (1988) and the ACS Melville L. Wolfrom Award in Carbohydrate Chemistry (2006).

Serianni is an elected Fellow of the Royal Society of Chemistry, the American Chemical Society, and the American Association for the Advancement of Science.

== Education ==
Serianni graduated with a BS in biochemistry from Albright College in 1975, and earned his PhD from Michigan State University in 1980 under the guidance of Robert Barker. Following doctoral studies, he studied as a postdoctoral research associate in the Section of Biochemistry at Cornell University from 1980 to 1982.

== Career ==
In 1982, Serianni co-founded Omicron Biochemicals, and has held the position of president and CEO since then. Concurrently, he started his academic career at the University of Notre Dame as an assistant professor, later advancing to professor of chemistry and biochemistry in 1999.

Serianni has held leadership positions in the American Chemical Society, serving as secretary, chairman-elect, chairman, past-chairman, and councilor of the Division of Carbohydrate Chemistry and Chemical Glycobiology.

Serianni founded the Lake Papakeechie Sustainability Initiative (LaPSI) in 2011, which focuses on evaluating and preserving the health of the Wawasee Area watershed in Indiana. The activities of LaPSI, supported by funds from Omicron Biochemicals, provide guidance to the Papakeechie Protective Association (PPA), which is headquartered in Syracuse, Indiana.

== Research ==
Serianni has contributed to the fields of chemistry, biochemistry, and biomedicine by studying the structural and dynamic properties of saccharides, their reactivities, and their roles in biological processes, including metabolic pathways and disease mechanisms. He holds a patent for determining the structure of a novel non-protein thermal hysteresis glycolipid based on a xylo-mannan oligosaccharide scaffold.

=== Synthesis of stable isotopically-labeled saccharides ===
During graduate studies at Michigan State University, Serianni developed improved synthetic methods to prepare stable isotopically labeled saccharides, primarily using ^{13}C, for use in structural, dynamics, and reactivity studies by NMR spectroscopy. To address the limited synthetic methods to prepare labeled saccharides, he introduced a chemical method for site-specific incorporation of ^{13}C and other stable isotopes into aldoses through cyanohydrin reduction, bypassing the traditional Kiliani-Fischer synthesis. He demonstrated the use of enzymes to convert isotopically-labeled aldoses into other biologically-important (phosphorylated) sugars and into oligosaccharides, and discovered a new mechanism of aldose backbone rearrangement (C1–C2 transposition) during C2-epimerization catalyzed by molybdate ion.

=== NMR methods for studies of saccharide structure and reactivity ===
Serianni's early research centered on NMR-based kinetic measurements of saccharide anomerization, the use of stable isotopes to investigate in vivo biological metabolism, and the application of ab initio molecular orbital calculations to saccharide structure and conformation. He showed that saturation-transfer NMR methods could be applied to measure unidirectional rate constants of aldose anomerization by selectively saturating C1 or H1 of the acyclic aldehydic form, allowing precise determinations of ring-opening and ring-closing rate constants. This work showed that furanose ring anomeric configuration influences ring-opening rates via anchimeric assistance. Kinetic studies of phosphorylated sugars highlighted the role of intramolecular catalysis by phosphate in anomerization.

In collaboration with John Duman at Notre Dame, Serianni developed isotope-based NMR tools to study sugar metabolism in the Arctic freeze-tolerant organism, Gynophora groenlandica. His lab designed a 16-mm ^{13}C NMR probe to study live larvae that were injected with labeled saccharides, allowing real-time, non-invasive monitoring of the metabolic fates of specific carbons in the sugars. To complement in vivo studies, he conducted in vitro experiments, incubating specific larvae organs with labeled sugars to map metabolic pathways, revealing metabolic triggers for polyol production, such as glycerol, and explored the effects of hypoxia and mitochondrial changes on cryoprotectant production.

Serianni's early research focused on applying ab initio molecular orbital (MO) theory to study saccharide structure and conformation. An early collaboration with Daniel Chipman at Notre Dame led to some of the first reported studies of furanose ring conformation at the STO-3G level of ab initio MO theory.

=== NMR spin-couplings in saccharide structure determinations ===
Serianni has devoted much of his research career to developing NMR spin-coupling constants (J-couplings) as quantitative probes of saccharide structure and conformation in solution, publishing over 50 papers on carbon-based J-couplings with his collaborator, Ian Carmichael. This work was initiated in 1993 with a publication in JACS, which showcased a Karplus-like relationship for ^{1}J_{CC} in saccharides, highlighting the power of combining NMR studies with stable isotopes and ab initio molecular orbital calculations. Since then his contributions have focused on ^{1}J_{CH} values as conformational probes of furanose rings and establishing the first ^{3}J_{COCC} Karplus curve for O-glycosidic linkages, illustrating the influence of terminal electronegative substituents on coupling magnitude. He has applied redundant NMR J-couplings to determine exocyclic hydroxymethyl group conformation in saccharides, defined the dependence of ^{2}J_{CCH} values on C–O bond rotations in saccharides, and has shown how hydrogen bond strengths can be determined from ^{1}J_{CH} values. In more recent seminal work, his laboratory has introduced a new circular statistics treatment of NMR J-coupling ensembles (MA'AT analysis) to calculate mean torsion angles and their population distributions in O-glycosidic linkages, enabling experimental validation of molecular dynamics predictions.

Serianni has investigated the mechanisms of saccharide degradation using stable isotopes and NMR. His work has demonstrated that the dicarbonyl sugar, 3-deoxyglucosone (3DG), degrades in aqueous solution via a 1,2-hydrogen transfer mechanism, resulting in C2-epimeric metasaccharinic acids. Building on early work and in collaboration with Billy Hudson at Vanderbilt University, he examined the effect of pyridoxamine on 3DG degradation, as high glucose concentrations in the blood can lead to the in vivo production of 3DG, causing cellular damage through protein glycation and other harmful reactions. In 2012, his group discovered a novel rearrangement of D-glucosone, wherein the molecule undergoes C1–C2 transposition during its conversion to D-ribulose.

== Awards and honors ==
- 2001 – John A. Boezi Memorial Alumnus Award, Michigan State University
- 2003 – Kaneb Teaching Award, University of Notre Dame
- 2006 – Melville L. Wolfrom Award in Carbohydrate Chemistry, American Chemical Society
- 2010 – Elected Fellow, American Association for the Advancement of Science
- 2012 – Elected Fellow, American Chemical Society
- 2012 – Elected Fellow, Royal Society of Chemistry

== Bibliography ==
=== Selected articles ===
- Hayes, M. L., Pennings, N. J., Serianni, A. S., & Barker, R. (1982). Epimerization of aldoses by molybdate involving a novel rearrangement of the carbon skeleton. Journal of the American Chemical Society, 104, 6764–6769.
- Podlasek, C. A., Wu, J., Stripe, W. A., Bondo, P. B., & Serianni, A. S. (1995). [^{13}C] Enriched methyl aldopyranosides: structural interpretations of ^{13}C-^{1}H spin-coupling constants and ^{1}H chemical shifts. Journal of the American Chemical Society, 117, 8635–8644.
- Zhu, Y., Zajicek, J., & Serianni, A. S. (2001). Acyclic forms of [1-^{13}C] aldohexoses in aqueous solution: quantitation by ^{13}C NMR and deuterium isotope effects on tautomeric equilibria. The Journal of Organic Chemistry, 66, 6244–6251.
- Stenutz, R., Carmichael, I., Widmalm, G., & Serianni, A. S. (2002). Hydroxymethyl group conformation in saccharides: structural dependencies of ^{2}J_{HH}, ^{3}J_{HH}, and ^{1}J_{CH} spin−spin coupling constants. The Journal of Organic Chemistry, 67, 949–958.
- Voziyan, P. A., Khalifah, R. G., Thibaudeau, C., Yildiz, A., Jacob, J., Serianni, A. S., & Hudson, B. G. (2003). Modification of proteins in vitro by physiological levels of glucose: pyridoxamine inhibits conversion of Amadori intermediate to advanced glycation end-products through binding of redox metal ions. Journal of Biological Chemistry, 278, 46616–46624.
- Zhang, W., Meredith, R. J., Wang, X., Woods, R. J., Carmichael, I., & Serianni, A. S. (2024). Does inter-residue hydrogen bonding in β-(1→4)-linked disaccharides influence linkage conformation in aqueous solution? The Journal of Physical Chemistry B, 128, 2317–2325.
