= The Migration Series =

Painting series by Jacob Lawrence

- Panel No. 1 of the 60-panel series
- Artist: Jacob Lawrence
- Year: 1940–1941
- Medium: Casein tempera on hardboard
- Subject: The Great Migration
- Dimensions: 30 cm × 46 cm (12 in × 18 in)
- Location: The Phillips Collection (odd-numbered panels); Museum of Modern Art (even-numbered panels)
- Preceded by: The Life of Toussaint L'Ouverture; The Life of Frederick Douglass; The Life of Harriet Tubman

The Migration Series, originally titled The Migration of the Negro, is a group of paintings by African-American painter Jacob Lawrence which depicts the migration of African Americans to the Northern United States from the South that began in the 1910s. It was published in 1941 and funded by the Julius Rosenwald Fund.

Painted in casein tempera on 60 12x18 inch hardboard panels, Lawrence's presentation of the Great Migration has been praised by many for its thoughtful, well-researched narrative on the Black experience during the period.

It is Lawrence’s most famous piece, as it was immediately and still is, displayed in both the Philips Collection as well as the Museum of Modern Art since 1941. Given its notoriety, it has been said it's Lawrence’s legacy. Lawrence conceived of the series as a single work rather than individual paintings and worked on all of the paintings at the same time, in order to give them a unified feel and to keep the colors uniform between panels. He wrote sentence-long captions for each of the sixty paintings explaining aspects of the event. Viewed in its entirety, the series creates a narrative in images and words that tells the story of the Great Migration. The impact is almost that of a comic book, which Lawrence was deeply inspired by.

== Background ==
Lawrence moved to Harlem when he was thirteen years old, having lived in New Jersey and Pennsylvania. His mother was born in Virginia and his father in South Carolina, so he would have been familiar with the migration from his own family members. Lawrence created the sixty paintings in the series in 1940–41 when he was twenty-three years old. He did so with the help of funding by a fellowship through the Julius Rosenwald Fund, and this was how Lawrence was able to afford his studio to work on this series in a climate-controlled space.

The series is based on the Great Migration of African Americans from the rural south to the urban north that began in the 1910s. The early part of the migration ran through 1930 and numbered some 1.6 million people. The panels depict the dire state of black life in the South, with poor wages, economic hardship due to the boll weevil, and a justice system rigged against them. The North offered better wages and slightly expanded rights, although was not without its problems; living conditions were much more crowded in the cities, which led to new threats such as tuberculosis outbreaks. The final panel notes that the migration continues. Migrants were still moving north in the 1950s and 1960s.

The series was collected and exhibited in Washington D.C. in 1993 and retitled from "The Migration of the Negro" to "The Migration Series" and almost all of the captions were rewritten. Notably, negro, a neutral term in 1941, had since fallen out of favor. Most of the new captions were shorter and use either "Black" or "African-American".

== Technique ==
The works consist of casein tempera paint applied to hardboard panels, atop a traditional gesso layer of rabbit-skin glue and whiting. Lawrence made his own casein tempera, purchasing the dry pigments from Fedanzie Sperrle and using them unmixed so that the colors would not vary between panels. With the panels laid out, he worked systematically to apply one color to each, starting with black and moving on to the lighter colors.

Lawrence was heavily inspired by comic books and Mexican muralism of the 1920s–1940s, and The Migration Series showcases techniques from both. When Lawerence painted these panels he used tempera painting technquies much like Diego Rivera, José Clemente Orozco, and David Alfaro Siqueiros. Applying a narrative like those found in many comic books at the time, telling stories through action movement of figures.

== Ownership ==
The sixty panels are shared between MoMA in New York and The Phillips Collection in Washington, D.C., a split that happened in 1942. Each has thirty panels, except when the collection is on loan (usually together).

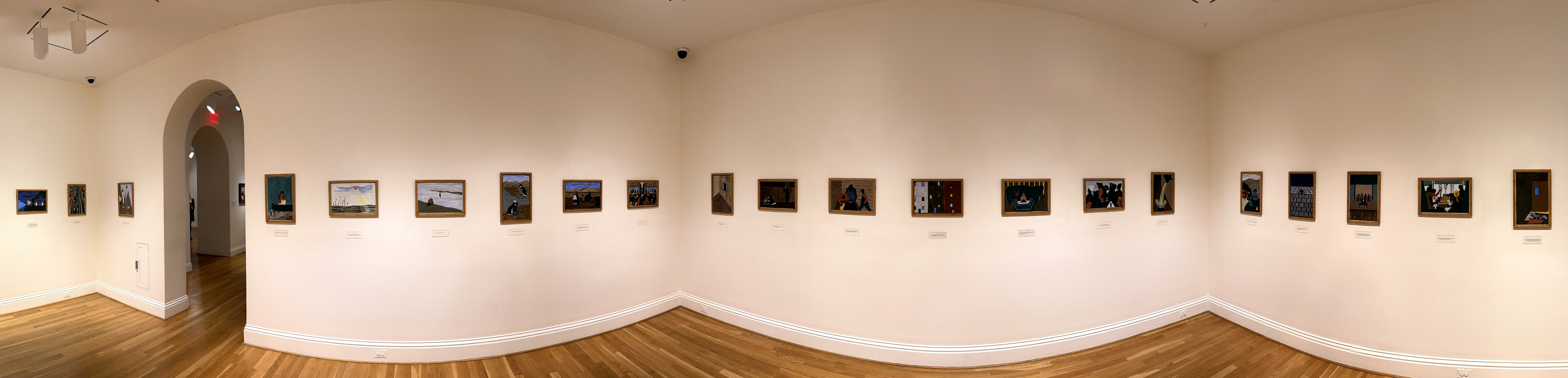
Half of the series is on display at The Phillips Collection in Washington, D.C.

== See also ==
- Great Migration (African American)
