= Labouré College =

Private college in Milton, Massachusetts, U.S.

Labouré College of Healthcare
- Former names: Carney Hospital Training School for Nurses (1892–1949); Catherine Labouré School of Nursing (1949–1971); Catherine Labouré Junior College (1971–1984); Catherine Labouré College (1984–1993); Labouré College (1993–2005); Caritas Labouré College (2005–2009)
- Motto: "In Thy Sight We Serve"
- Type: Private college
- Active: 1892–2026
- Location: Milton, Massachusetts, United States; 42°15′38.8″N 71°3′29.2″W
- Campus: Urban
- Colors: Royal Blue and White
- Website: www.laboure.edu

Labouré College of Healthcare was a private college specializing in nursing and healthcare education and located in Milton, Massachusetts.

Founded in 1892, by the Daughters of Charity, it was the longest-running nursing education program in the Boston area. The college offered online and on-campus certificate, associate, and bachelor's degree programs. In 2013, the campus moved from Dorchester to Milton, Massachusetts. In February 2026, it was announced that Labouré was closing effective August 31, 2026 and that its nursing programs had been acquired by Curry College.

== History ==
Labouré was founded in 1892 as the Carney Hospital Training School for Nurses in South Boston. In 1949, the school merged with two other nursing schools run by the Daughters of Charity of St. Vincent de Paul: the St. John's School of Nursing in Lowell, Massachusetts and the St. Margaret's School of Nursing in Dorchester. They formed the Catherine Labouré School of Nursing, named for St. Catherine Labouré, in 1950. The new school opened in 1951 and moved to the site of the new Carney Hospital in Dorchester in 1954. In 1971, it was authorized to award degrees in Massachusetts and changed its name to the Catherine Labouré Junior College. Its name changed again in 1984 to Catherine Labouré College and in 1993 to simply Labouré College. In 1997, the college became part of the Caritas Christi Health Care system and its name was officially changed to Caritas Labouré College in 2005, then officially changed back to Labouré College in 2009.

Until 1997, the school was sponsored by the Daughters of Charity of St. Vincent de Paul. It was subsequently affiliated with Steward Health Care System, until 2013 when it disaffiliated.

=== Presidents ===
- Debra Townsley, 2018–2019
- Lily Hsu, 2019–2026

== Campus ==
In 2013, Labouré College relocated from Dorchester to its new campus at 303 Adams Street in Milton, Massachusetts, the former campus of Aquinas College adjacent to Fontbonne Academy.

== Academics ==
Labouré offered the Bachelor of Science degree in nursing (BSN) and the Associate of Science degree in nursing and in allied health programs. It was first accredited by the New England Association of Schools and Colleges (NEASC) in 1975 and gained accreditation under the New England Commission of Higher Education in 2005.

== Student life ==
Labouré was a commuter college, not a residential college. Most of its students were part-time. The average age was 31.
