= Harlem Community Art Center =

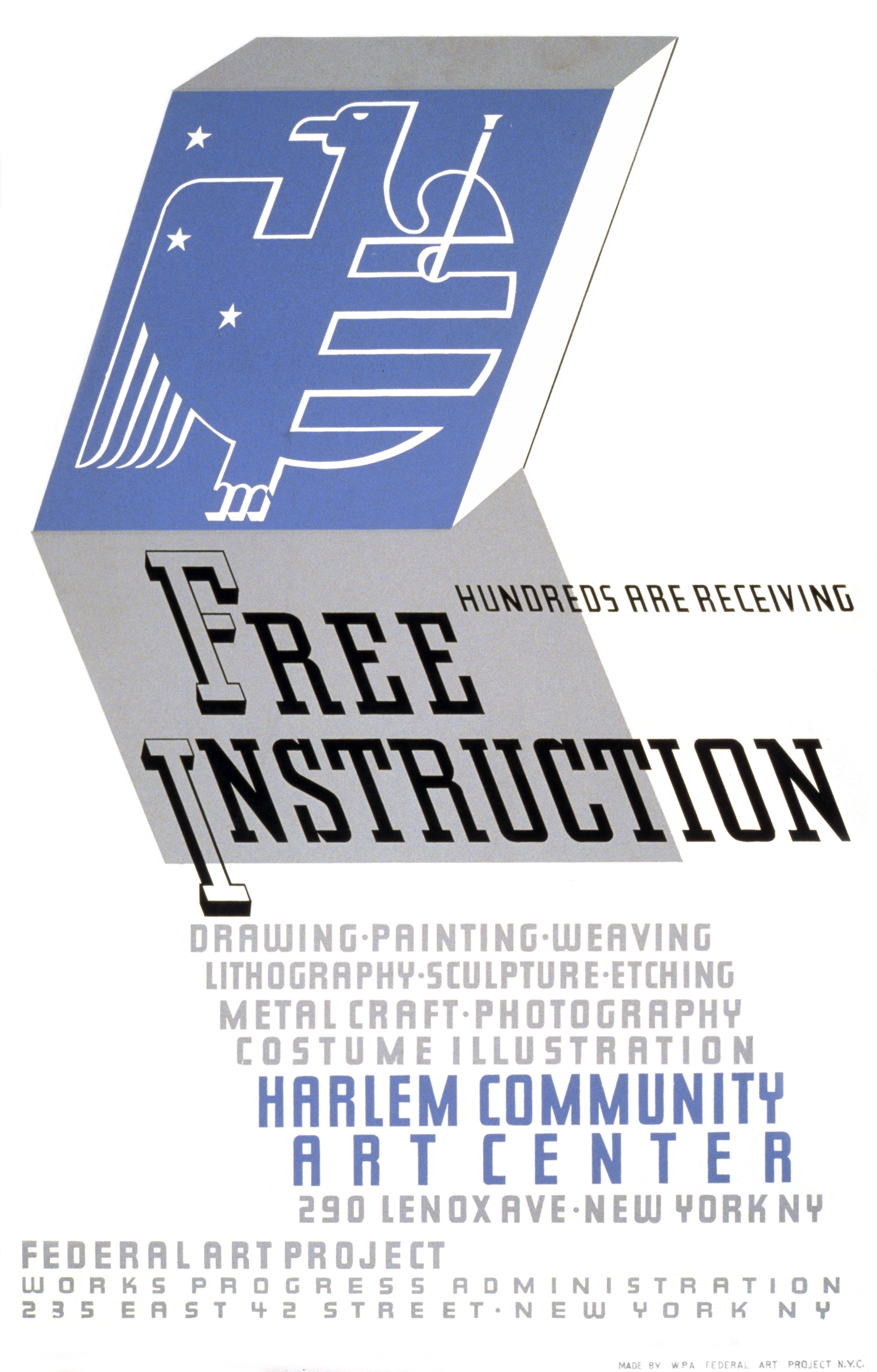
Poster for the Harlem Community Art Center (1938)

The Harlem Community Art Center was a Federal Art Project community art center that operated from 1937 to 1942. It influenced various budding artists intent on depicting Harlem and led to the formation of the Harlem Arts Alliance. It became a countrywide exemplar for others, notably the South Side Community Art Center in Chicago.

== History ==
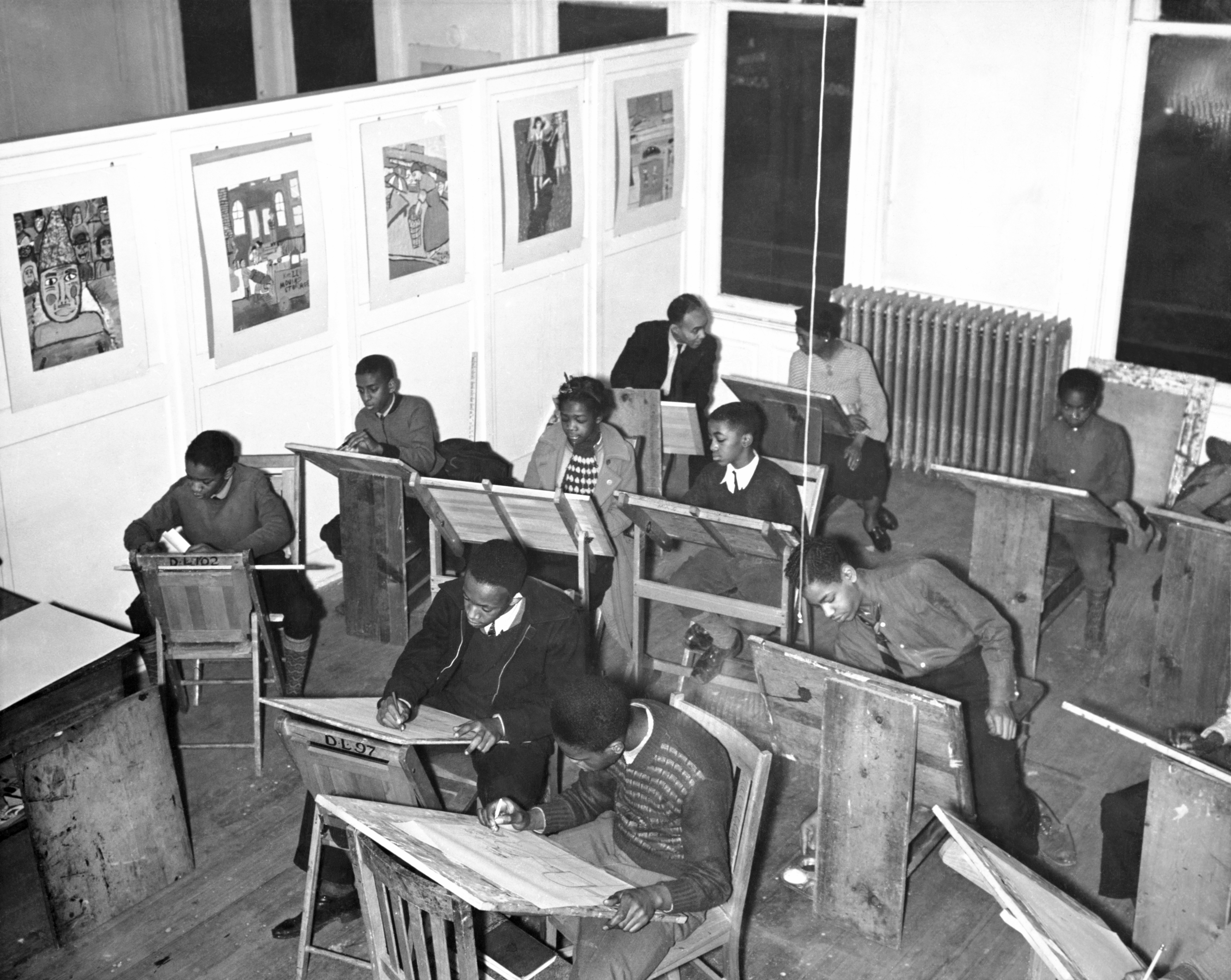
Students at the Harlem Community Art Center (January 1, 1938)

Augusta Savage led various art classes in Harlem, and several other art leaders collaborated with the 135th Street Branch of the New York Public Library in establishing community workshops. The Harlem YMCA also held art classes between 1934 and 1935 led by sculptor William Artis.

The idea for the Harlem Community Art Center came from African-American artists in the Harlem Artists Guild. They envisioned a community space free to all, making art instruction accessible. The Harlem Community Art Center was based on the ideal that art was central to community, and aspired to be both a space for exposing people to art and an institution for developing African-American artists.

The Harlem Community Art Center was a WPA-sponsored center in operation from November 1937 to 1942. The center was first directed by Augusta Savage, and Gwendolyn Bennett assumed the role afterward. It is widely considered a focal arena for the Harlem Renaissance.

== Significance ==
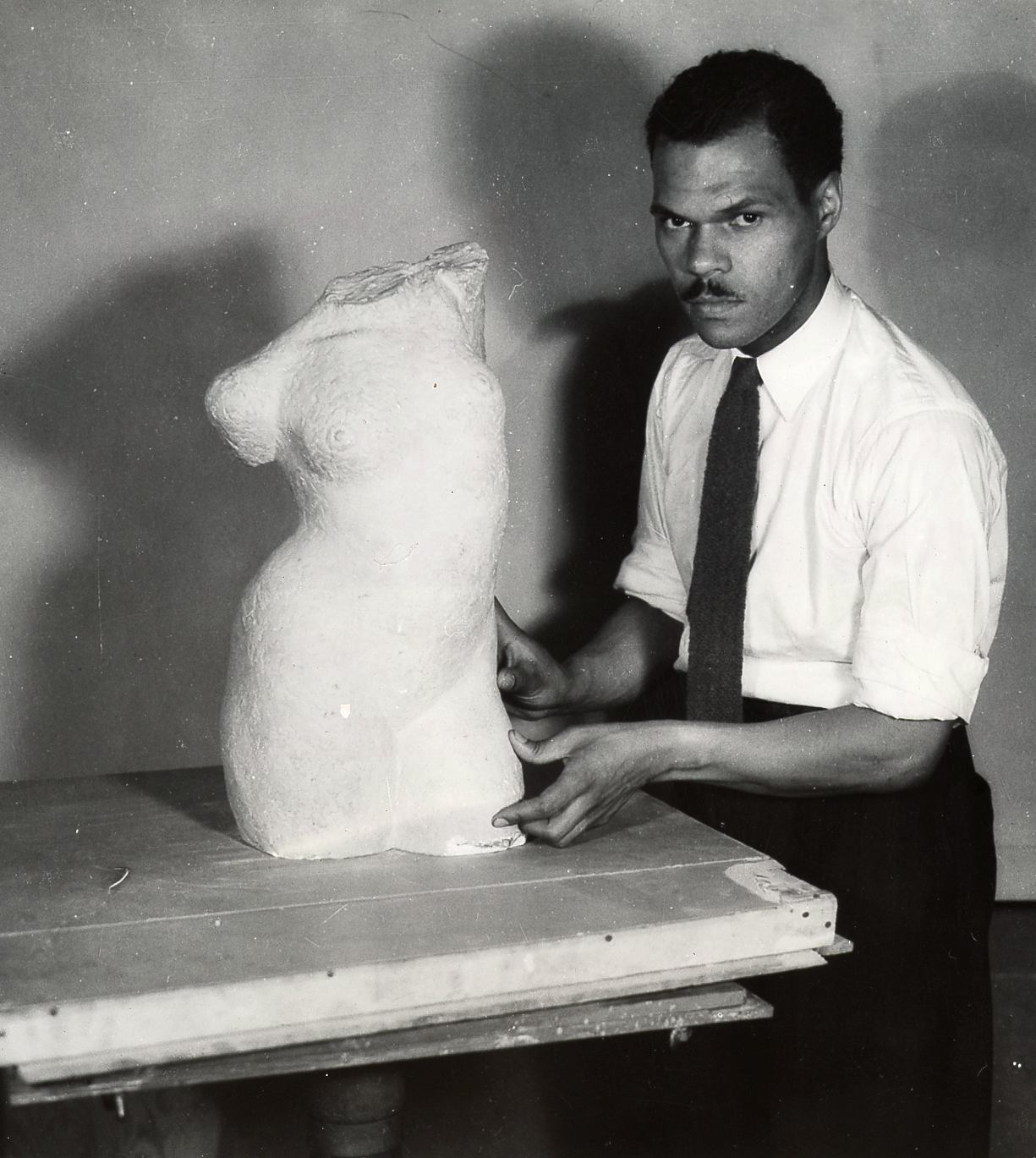
Henry Bannarn, an instructor at the Harlem Community Art Center (1937)

In its first 16 months, 70,592 people attended Harlem Community Art Center activities and more than 1,500 took part in day or evening classes in drawing, painting, sculpture, printmaking, and design. Artists who taught or studied at the center include Charles Alston, Henry Bannarn, Romare Bearden, Selma Burke, Ernest Crichlow, Aaron Douglas, Elton Fax, Sargent Johnson, William Henry Johnson, Langston Hughes, Ronald Joseph, Robert Blackburn, Jacob Lawrence, Norman Lewis, Claude McKay, James Lesene Wells and Richard Wright.

The center also had the chance to influence more than just adults: "And who are these people who have been reached by the Center? Exactly 2,467 children and adults have registered in the art classes. More than 23,989 people have participated in the Center's extension activities, lectures, and demonstrations. Thousands of others come to the Center regularly to see the exhibitions and to attend other special events". Psychiatric wards would send children with mental illnesses to the center and they flourished.

The Harlem Community Art Center had a multiethnic faculty and a diverse student population was also diverse. Students ranged from established Harlem artists to children from New York psychiatric hospitals who benefitted from creative activities.

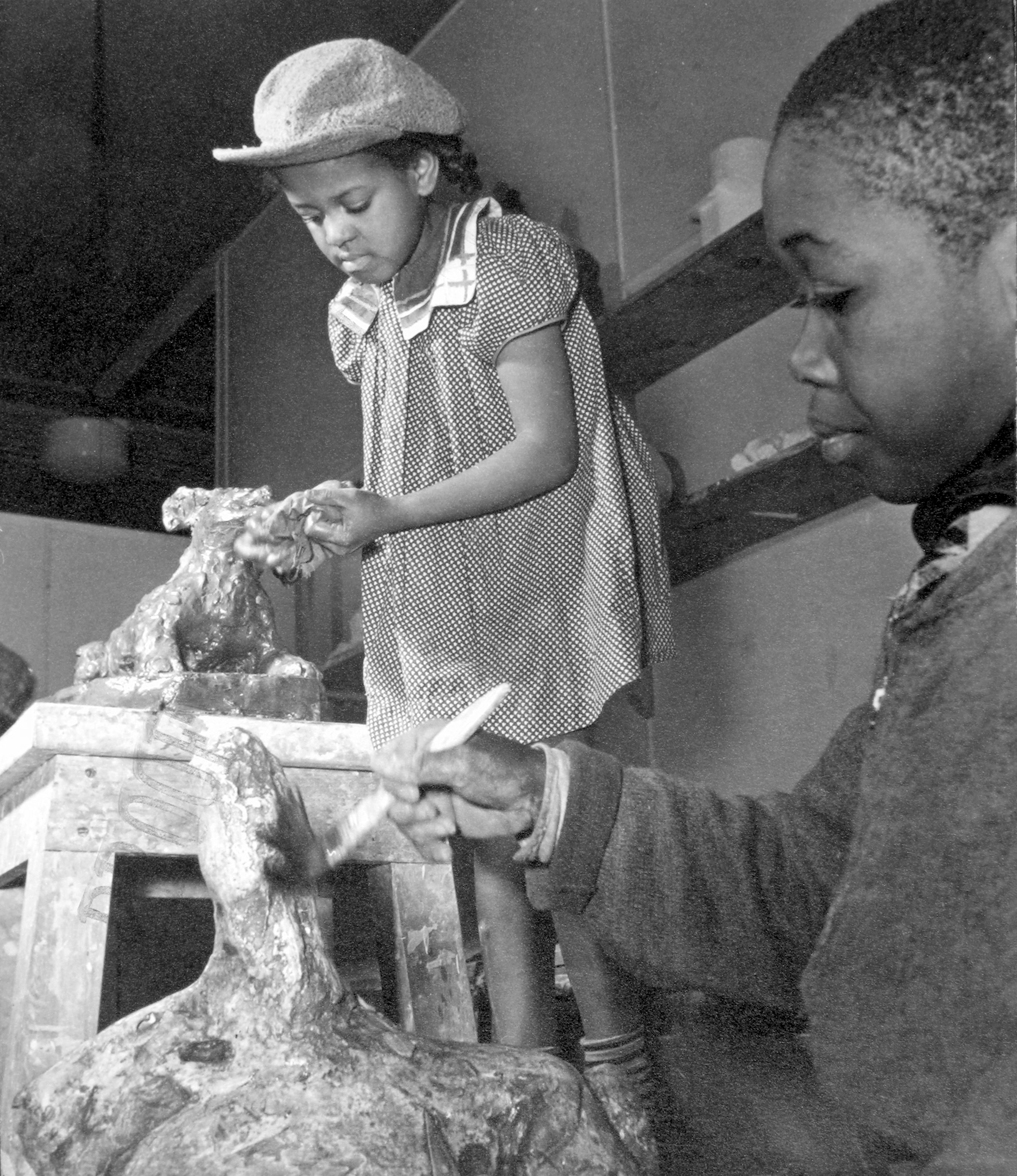
Two children at the Harlem Community Art Center in 1939
