= Jacob Lawrence =

American painter (1917–2000)

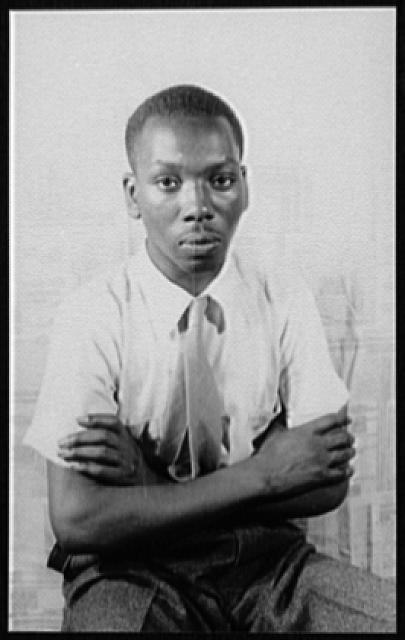
- Lawrence in 1941
- Born: September 7, 1917; Atlantic City, New Jersey, United States
- Died: June 9, 2000 (aged 82); Seattle, Washington, United States
- Education: Harlem Community Art Center
- Known for: Paintings portraying African-American life
- Notable work: The Migration Series
- Spouse: Gwendolyn Knight (m. 1941)

Jacob Armstead Lawrence (September 7, 1917 – June 9, 2000) was an American painter known for his portrayal of African-American historical subjects and contemporary life. Lawrence referred to his style as "dynamic cubism", an art form popularized in Europe which drew great inspiration from West African and Meso-American art. For his compositions, Lawrence found inspiration in everyday life in Harlem. He brought the African-American experience to life using blacks and browns juxtaposed with vivid colors. Lawrence also taught and spent 16 years as a professor at the University of Washington.

Lawrence is among the best known 20th-century African-American painters, known for his modernist portrayals of everyday life as well as narratives of African-American history and historical figures. At age 23, Lawrence gained national recognition with his 60-panel The Migration Series, which depicted the Great Migration of African Americans from the rural South to the urban North. The series was purchased jointly by the Phillips Collection in Washington, D.C., and the Museum of Modern Art (MoMA) in New York. Lawrence's works are in the permanent collections of numerous museums, including the Philadelphia Museum of Art, the Whitney Museum, Metropolitan Museum of Art, the Brooklyn Museum, the Virginia Museum of Fine Arts, Reynolda House Museum of American Art, and the Museum of Northwest Art. His 1947 painting The Builders hangs in the White House.

== Biography ==
=== Early years ===
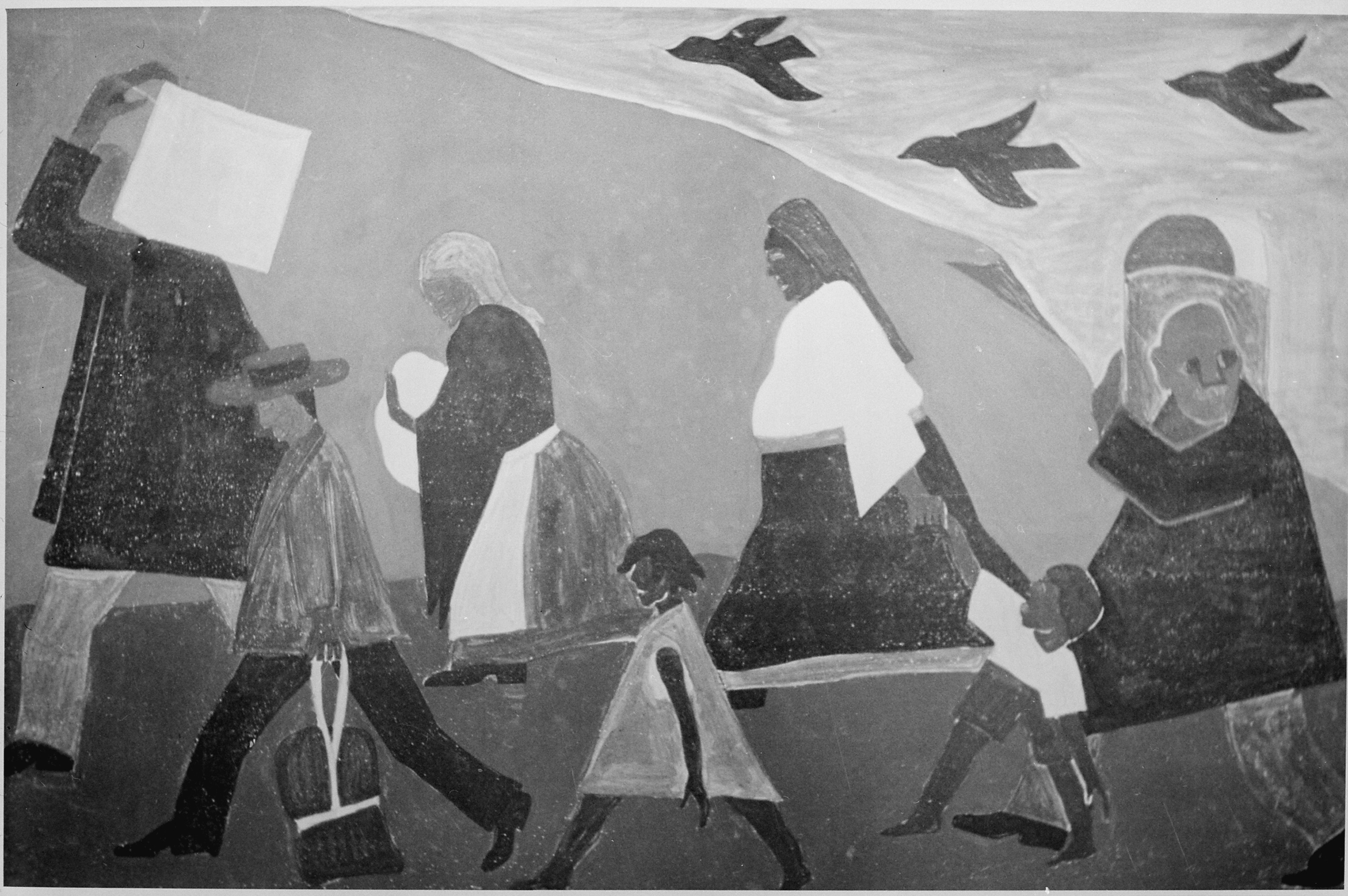
Douglass argued against poor Negroes leaving the South

Jacob Lawrence was born on September 7, 1917, in Atlantic City, New Jersey, where his parents had migrated from the rural south. They divorced in 1924. His mother put Lawrence and his two younger siblings into foster care in Philadelphia. At age 13, Lawrence and his siblings moved to New York City, where he reconnected with his mother in Harlem. Lawrence was introduced to art shortly after that when their mother enrolled him in after-school classes at an arts and crafts settlement house in Harlem, called Utopia Children's Center, in an effort to keep him busy. The young Lawrence often drew patterns with crayons. In the beginning, he copied the patterns of his mother's carpets.

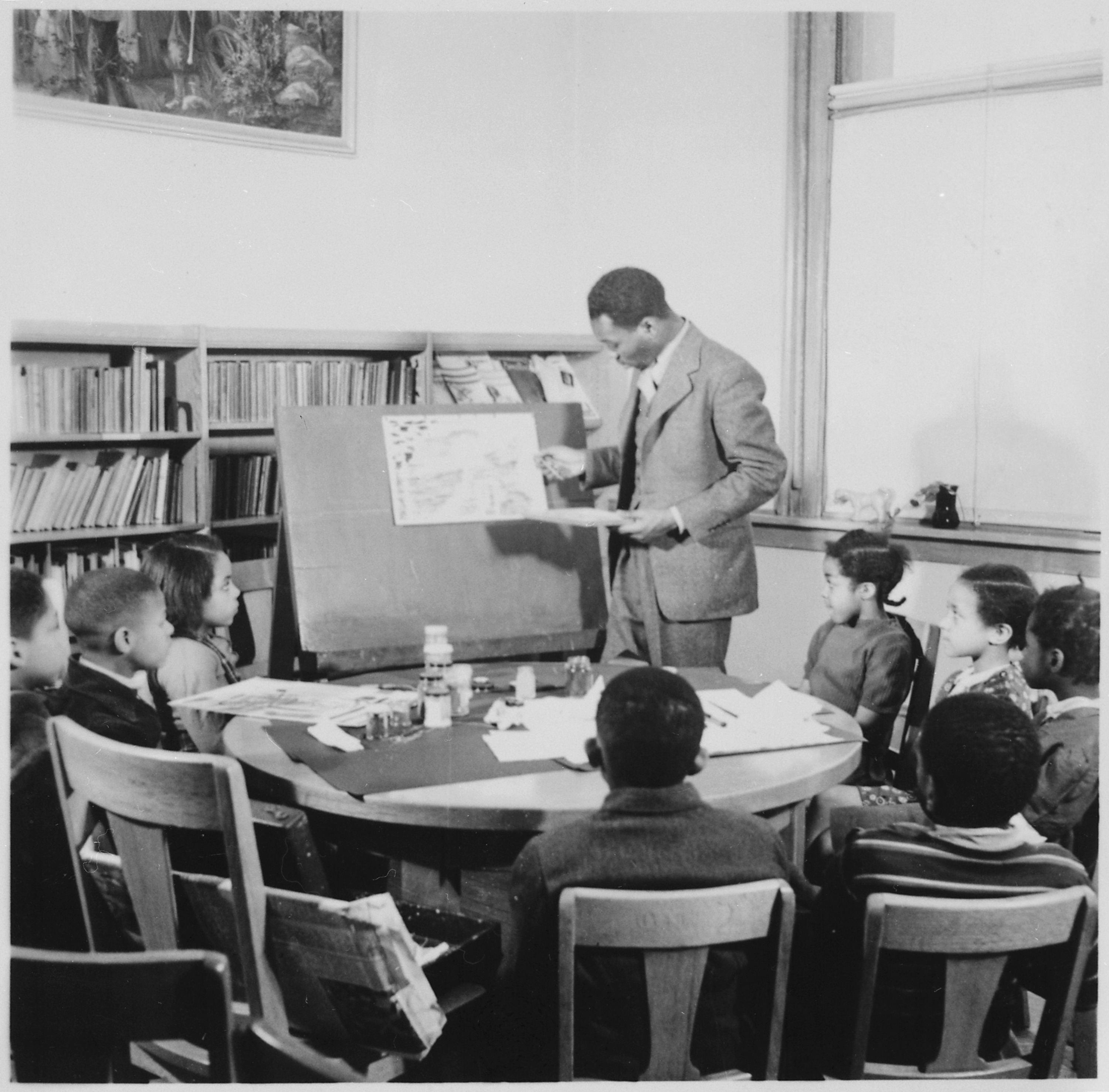
Lawrence teaching school children at the Abraham Lincoln School

After dropping out of school at age 16, Lawrence worked in a laundromat and a printing plant. He continued with art, attending classes at the Harlem Art Workshop, taught by the noted African-American artist Charles Alston. Alston urged Lawrence to attend the Harlem Community Art Center, led by the sculptor Augusta Savage. Savage secured a scholarship to the American Artists School for Lawrence and a paid position with the Works Progress Administration, established during the Great Depression by the administration of President Franklin D. Roosevelt. Lawrence continued his studies as well, working with Alston and Henry Bannarn, another Harlem Renaissance artist, in the Alston-Bannarn workshop. Lawrence also studied at Harlem Art Workshop in New York in 1937. Harlem provided crucial training for the majority of Black artists in the United States. Lawrence was one of the first artists trained in and by the African-American community in Harlem. Throughout his lengthy artistic career, Lawrence concentrated on exploring the history and struggles of African Americans.

The "hard, bright, brittle" aspects of Harlem during the Great Depression inspired Lawrence as much as the colors, shapes, and patterns inside the homes of its residents. He told historian Paul Karlstrom, "Even in my mother's home, people of my mother's generation would decorate their homes in all sorts of color... so you'd think in terms of Matisse." Lawrence used water-based media throughout his career. He started to gain some notice for his dramatic and lively portrayals of both contemporary scenes of African-American urban life as well as historical events, all of which Lawrence depicted in crisp shapes, bright, clear colors, dynamic patterns, and through revealing posture and gestures.

=== Career ===
Toussaint at Ennery, 1989

At the very beginning of his career, Lawrence developed the approach that made his reputation and remained his touchstone: creating series of paintings that told a story or, less often, depicted many aspects of a subject. His first were biographical accounts of key figures of the African diaspora. Lawrence was just 21 years old when his series of 41 paintings of the Haitian general Toussaint L’Ouverture, who led the revolution of the slaves that eventually gained independence, was shown in an exhibit of African-American artists at the Baltimore Museum of Art. This was followed by a series of paintings of the lives of Harriet Tubman (1938–39) and Frederick Douglass (1939–40). Lawrence's early work involved general depictions of everyday life in Harlem and also a major series dedicated to African-American history (1940–1941).

Lawrence's teacher Charles Alston assesses Lawrence's work in an essay for an exhibition at the Harlem YMCA 1938:

Having thus far miraculously escaped the imprint of academic ideas and current vogues in art,... he has followed a course of development dictated by his own inner motivations... Working in the very limited medium of flat tempera he achieved a richness and brilliance of color harmonies both remarkable and exciting... Lawrence symbolizes more than anyone I know, the vitality, the seriousness and promise of a new and socially conscious generation of Negro artists.

On July 24, 1941, Lawrence married the painter Gwendolyn Knight, also a student of Savage. She helped prepare the gesso panels for his paintings and contributed to the captions for the paintings in his multi-painting works.

==== The Migration Series ====
Lawrence completed the 60-panel set of narrative paintings entitled The Migration of the Negro or And the Migrants Kept Coming, now called the Migration Series, in 1940–41. The series portrayed the Great Migration, when hundreds of thousands of African Americans moved from the rural South to the urban North after World War I. Because he was working in tempera, which dries rapidly, he planned all the paintings in advance and then applied a single color wherever he was using it across all the scenes to maintain tonal consistency. Only then did he proceed to the next color. The series was exhibited at the Downtown Gallery in Greenwich Village, which made him the first African-American artist represented by a New York gallery. This brought him national recognition. Selections from this series were featured in a 1941 issue of Fortune. The entire series was purchased jointly and divided by the Phillips Collection in Washington, D.C., which holds the odd-numbered paintings, and New York's Museum of Modern Art, which holds the even-numbered.

Another biographical series of 22 panels devoted to the abolitionist John Brown followed in 1941–42. When these pairings became too fragile to display, Lawrence, working on commission, recreated the paintings as a portfolio of silkscreen prints in 1977.

In 1943, Howard Devree, wrote for The New York Times, that Lawrence in his next series of 30 images had "even more successfully concentrated his attention on the many-sided life of his people in Harlem". He called the set "an amazing social document" and wrote:

Lawrence's color is fittingly vivid for his interpretations. A strong semi-abstract approach aids him in arriving at his basic or archetypal statements. Confronting this work one feels as if vouchsafed an extraordinary elemental experience. Lawrence has grown in his use of rhythm as well as in sheer design and fluency.

==== World War II ====
In October 1943, during the Second World War, Lawrence was drafted into the United States Coast Guard and served as a public affairs specialist with the first racially integrated crew on the USCGC Sea Cloud, under Carlton Skinner. He continued to paint and sketch while in the Coast Guard, documenting the experience of war around the world. He produced 48 paintings during this time, all of which have been lost. He achieved the rank of petty officer third class.

==== Lost works ====
In October and November 1944, MoMA exhibited all 60 migration panels plus 8 of the paintings Lawrence created aboard the Sea Cloud. He posed, still in his uniform, in front of a sign that read: "Jacob Lawrence, The Migration Series and Works Created in the US Coast Guard". The Coast Guard sent the eight paintings to exhibits around the United States. In the disorder and personnel changes that came with demobilization at the end of the war, they went missing.

==== Post-war ====
In 1945, Lawrence was awarded a fellowship in the fine arts by the Guggenheim Foundation. In 1946, Josef Albers recruited Lawrence to join the faculty of the summer art program at Black Mountain College.

Returning to New York, Lawrence continued to paint but grew depressed; in 1949, he checked himself into Hillside Hospital in Queens, where he remained for 11 months. Painting there, Lawrence produced his Hospital Series: works that were uncharacteristic of him in their focus of his subjects' emotional states as inpatients.

Between 1954 and 1956, Lawrence produced a 30-panel series called "Struggle: From the History of the American People" that depicted historical scenes from 1775 to 1817. The series, originally planned to include 60 panels, ranges from references to current events like the 1954 Army-McCarthy hearings and relatively obscure or neglected aspects of American history, like a woman, Margaret Cochran Corbin, in combat or the wall built by unseen enslaved Blacks that protected the American forces at the Battle of New Orleans. Rather than traditional titles, Lawrence labeled each panel with a quote. He titled a panel depicting Patrick Henry's famous speech with the less well-known passage: "Is life so dear, or peace so sweet, as to be purchased at the price of chains and slavery." A panel depicting an African American slave revolt is titled with the words of a man who sued for emancipation from slavery in 1773: "We have no property! We have no wives! No children! We have no city! No country!" The fraught politics of the mid-1950s prevented the series from finding a museum purchaser, and the panels had been sold to a private collector who re-sold them as individual works. Three panels (Panels 14, 20 and 29) are lost, and three others were only located in 2017, 2020, and 2021. In 2021, the Peabody Essex Museum organized an exhibition all 30 of the panels including the newly discovered ones and reproductions of the works too fragile to travel or whose location is unknown.

The Brooklyn Museum of Art mounted a retrospective exhibition of Lawrence's work in 1960. In 1969, he was among 200 Black artists in a premier show sponsored by the Philadelphia School District and the Pennsylvania Civic Center Museum. The show featured some of the top names in the country, including Ellen Powell Tiberino, Horace Pippin, Nancy Elizabeth Prophet, Barbara Bullock, Benny Andrews, Roland Ayers, Romare Bearden, Avel de Knight, Barkley Hendricks, Paul Keene, Raymond Saunders, Louis B. Sloan, Ed Wilson, Henry Ossawa Tanner and Joshua Johnson.

==== Publications ====
Lawrence illustrated several works for children. Harriet and the Promised Land appeared in 1968 and used the series of paintings that told the story of Harriet Tubman. It was listed as one of the year's best illustrated books by The New York Times and praised by the Boston Globe: "The author's artistic talents, sensitivity and insight into the black experience have resulted in a book that actually creates, within the reader, a spiritual experience." Two similar volumes based on his John Brown and Great Migration series followed. Lawrence created illustrations for a selection of 18 of Aesop's Fables for Windmill Press in 1970, and the University of Washington Press published the full set of 23 tales in 1998.

==== Teaching and late works ====
Lawrence taught at several schools after his first stint teaching at Black Mountain College, including the New School for Social Research, the Art Students League, Pratt Institute, and the Skowhegan School. Lawrence became a visiting artist at the University of Washington in 1970 and was professor of art there from 1971 to 1986. He was graduate advisor there to lithographer and abstract painter James Claussen.

Shortly after moving to Washington state, Lawrence did a series of five paintings on the westward journey of African-American pioneer George Washington Bush. These paintings are now in the collection of the State of Washington History Museum.

Lawrence undertook several major commissions in this part of his career. In 1980, he completed Exploration, a 40-foot-long mural made of porcelain on steel, comprising a dozen panels devoted to academic endeavor. It was installed in Howard University's Blackburn Center. The Washington Post described it as "enormously sophisticated yet wholly unpretentious " and said:

The colors are completely flat, but because the porcelain is layered, and because Lawrence here and there paints in strong black shadows, his mural has the look of a rich relief. It is full of visual rhymes. The small scene of John Henry, the steel drivin' man, in the final panel is echoed by an image of a sculptor in the art scene: He is hammering another spike, for quite different reasons, into a block of stone. This is not art that one tires of, for it is not the sort of work one can read at once.

Lawrence produced another series in 1983, eight screen prints called the Hiroshima Series. Commissioned to provide full-page illustrations for a new edition of a work of his choice, Lawrence chose John Hersey's Hiroshima (1946). He depicted in abstract visual language several survivors at the moment of the bombing in the midst of physical and emotional destruction. Lawrence's painting Theater was commissioned by the University of Washington in 1985 and installed in the main lobby of the Meany Hall for the Performing Arts.

In the early 1990s, Lawrence was commissioned to paint the Events in the Life of Harold Washington mural in Chicago's Harold Washington Library.

=== Last years and death ===
The Whitney Museum of American Art produced an exhibition of Lawrence's entire career in 1974, as did the Seattle Art Museum in 1986.

In 1999, Lawrence and his wife established the Jacob and Gwendolyn Lawrence Foundation for the creation, presentation and study of American art, with a particular emphasis on work by African-American artists. It represents their estates and maintains a searchable archive of nearly a thousand images of their work.

Lawrence continued to paint until a few weeks before his death from lung cancer on June 9, 2000, at age 82. Lawrence's wife, Gwendolyn Knight, outlived him and died in 2005 at age 91.

== Awards and honors ==
- 1945: Awarded a fellowship in the fine arts by the Guggenheim Foundation
- 1970: Awarded the Spingarn Medal by the NAACP for his outstanding achievements
- 1971: Elected an associate member of the National Academy of Design
- 1978: Elected a member of the National Academy of Design
- 1983: Elected a member of the American Academy of Arts and Letters
- 1990: Awarded the U.S. National Medal of Arts
- 1995: Elected a fellow of the American Academy of Arts and Sciences
- 1996: The Meadows School of the Arts at Southern Methodist University awarded him the Algur H. Meadows Award for Excellence.
- 1998: Awarded the highest honor of Washington state, The Washington Medal of Merit

The eighteen institutions that awarded Lawrence honorary degrees include Harvard University, Yale University, Howard University, Amherst College, and New York University.

== Legacy ==
The New York Times described Lawrence as "one of America's leading modern figurative painters" and "among the most impassioned visual chroniclers of the African-American experience." Shortly before his death, Lawrence stated: "...for me, a painting should have three things: universality, clarity and strength. Clarity and strength so that it may be aesthetically good. Universality so that it may be understood by all men."

A retrospective exhibition of Lawrence's work, planned before his death, opened at the Phillips Collection in May 2001 and travelled to the Whitney Museum of American Art, the Detroit Institute of Fine Arts, the Los Angeles County Museum of Art, and the Museum of Fine Arts, Houston. The exhibit was meant to coincide with the publication of Jacob Lawrence: Paintings, Drawings, and Murals (1935-1999), A Catalogue Raisonne. His last commissioned public work, the mosaic mural New York in Transit made of Murano glass, was installed in October 2001 in the Times Square subway station in New York City.

In 2005, Dixie Café, a 1948 brush-and-ink drawing by Lawrence, was selected to suggest The Civil Rights Act of 1964 in a U.S. postage stamp panel commemorating milestones of the Civil Rights Movement. The stamp sheet was called To Form A More Perfect Union.

In May 2007, the White House Historical Association purchased Lawrence's The Builders (1947) at auction for $2.5 million. The painting has hung in the White House Green Room since 2009.

From September 14, 2013 – April 13, 2014, the Walters Art Museum exhibited Jacob Lawrence’s Genesis Series created in 1990.

From October 8, 2016 – January 8, 2017, The Phillips Collection exhibited People on the Move: Beauty and Struggle in Jacob Lawrence’s Migration Series. The exhibit presented The Phillips Collection odd-numbered panels with the Museum of Modern Art’s even-numbered panels to display all 60 panels of The Migration Series.

From January 7 – 30 April 30, 2017 The Phillips Collection exhibited The Life of Toussaint L’Ouverture, 15 silkscreen prints that Lawrence created between 1986 and 1997, distilled from his 41 paintings of L’Ouverture that he created at the start of his career. To create these prints, Lawrence worked with master printmaker Lou Stovall.

In 2020, the Peabody Essex Museum, Salem, Massachusetts organized Jacob Lawrence: The American Struggle from Lawrence’s Struggle: From the History of the American People series created between 1954 and 1956. It was the first museum exhibition of the paintings and first time the works were shown together since 1958. It included panels found in 2020 and 2021 and reproductions of the works too fragile to travel or whose location is unknown (Panel 14, Panel 20, and Panel 29). The exhibit was accompanied by works from contemporary artists Derrick Adams, Bethany Collins, and Hank Willis Thomas. Jacob Lawrence: The American Struggle was exhibited at the Peabody Essex Museum January 18–August 9, 2020; the Metropolitan Museum of Art August 29–November 1, 2020; the Birmingham Museum of Art, Birmingham, Alabama, November 20, 2020 – February 7, 2021; the Seattle Art Museum March 5–May 23, 2021; and The Phillips Collection June 26–September 19, 2021. The catalog was edited by Elizabeth Hutton Turner and Austen Barron Baily ISBN 978-0-295-74704-0

The Seattle Art Museum offers the Gwendolyn Knight and Jacob Lawrence Fellowship, a $10,000 award to "individuals whose original work reflects the Lawrences' concern with artistic excellence, education, mentorship and scholarship within the cultural contexts and value systems that informed their work and the work of other artists of color." The Jacob Lawrence Gallery at the University of Washington School of Art + Art History + Design offers an annual Jacob Lawrence Legacy Residency.

Lawrence's work is in the permanent collections of numerous museums, including the British Museum, the Metropolitan Museum of Art, the Smithsonian American Art Museum, the Museum of Modern Art, the Whitney Museum, the Phillips Collection, the Brooklyn Museum, the National Gallery of Art and Reynolda House Museum of American Art, the Art Institute Chicago, the Madison Museum of Contemporary Art, the Kalamazoo Institute of Arts, the Minneapolis Institute of Art, the Minnesota Museum of American Art, the Savannah College of Art and Design Museum, the Seattle Art Museum, the Birmingham Museum of Art, the Indianapolis Museum of Art, the University of Michigan Museum of Art, the North Carolina Museum of Art, the Princeton University Art Museum, the Musei Vaticani, the Paul G. Allen School of Computer Science and Engineering, the Pennsylvania Academy of the Fine Arts, the Saint Louis Art Museum, the Virginia Museum of Fine Arts, the Studio Museum in Harlem, the Philadelphia Museum of Art, the Portland Art Museum, the Hudson River Museum, and The Walker Art Center in Minneapolis.

== See also ==
- List of African-American visual artists
- List of Federal Art Project artists
