= List of Kappa Alpha Psi chapters =

Kappa Alpha Psi an international historically Black fraternity. Following its inception at Indiana University in 1911, the fraternity expanded to the University of Illinois (1913), University of Iowa (1914), and Wilberforce University, Lincoln University, and Ohio State University (1915). The first chapter in the Southern United States was Kappa, founded in 1919 at Meharry Medical College. By 1921, the fraternity had grown to seventeen active chapters.

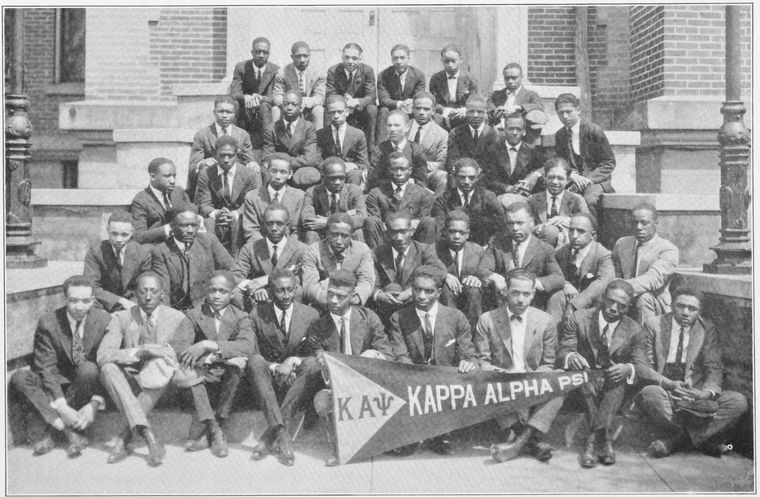
Delta chapter at Wilberforce University in 1922

As of 2026, Kappa Alpha Psi has chartered more than 400 undergraduate chapters in the continental United States, plus alumni and international chapters. Chapters are organized into twelve provinces: East Central, Eastern, Middle Eastern, Middle Western, North Central, Northeastern, Northern, South Central, Southern, Southeastern, Southwestern, and Western.

== Collegiate chapters ==
In the following list of Kappa Alpha Psi collegiate chapters, active chapters are indicated bold and inactive chapters and institutions are in italics.

Chapter	Charter date and range (Note: Kappa Alpha Psi does not withdraw charters when a chapter goes inactive, but can be re-established at a later date.)	Institution	Location	Status	Ref.
Alpha	January 5, 1911 – November 15, 2024	Indiana University Bloomington	Bloomington, Indiana	Inactive	(Note: The university suspended the chapter for hazing.)
Beta	February 8, 1913 – 2005; 2010 – 20xx ?	University of Illinois Urbana-Champaign	Champaign, Illinois	Inactive	(Note: Chapter was formed from the Illio Club, a local group for African American men at the University of Illinois, now the University of Illinois at Urbana-Champaign. The university revoked the chapter's recognition for hazing and causing bodily harm through January 20, 2026.)
Gamma	March 7, 1914	University of Iowa	Iowa City, Iowa	Inactive	(Note: Founded as Delta of Kappa Alpha Nu, but was changed to Gamma after the decision to use Greek letters only for collegiate chapter names. The original Gamma chapter was an alumni chapter.)
Delta	January 22, 1915	Wilberforce University	Wilberforce, Ohio	Active	(Note: Delta was the last chapter chartered under the fraternity's original name, Kappa Alpha Nu, and the first chapter designated after the fraternity's name change to Kappa Alpha Psi.)
Epsilon	December 4, 1915	Lincoln University	Lincoln University, Pennsylvania	Active	
Zeta	December 15, 1915	Ohio State University	Columbus, Ohio	Active	
Eta	March 12, 1916	University of Nebraska–Lincoln	Lincoln, Nebraska	Active	
Theta	April 21, 1917	Northwestern University	Evanston, Illinois	Active	
Iota	February 9, 1918	University of Chicago	Chicago, Illinois	Active	
Kappa	February 19, 1919	Meharry Medical College	Nashville, Tennessee	Active	(Note: The first "intermediate chapter", a chapter chartered at degree-granting professional or post-graduate institutions, which generally require entering students to have earned a bachelor's degree as a condition of admission.)
Lambda	February 20, 1920 – 1960; 19xx ?	Temple University	Philadelphia, Pennsylvania	Active	
Mu	March 27, 1920	University of Kansas	Lawrence, Kansas	Active	
Nu	October 5, 1920 – April 2005; 20xx ?	Purdue University	West Lafayette, Indiana	Active	(Note: The Nu chapter was chartered by founders Ezra D. Alexander and Guy L. Grant at the (University of Indianapolis (1896))—a federation that consisted of Butler College, the Indiana Dental College, and the Indiana Law School—before later moving to the modern University of Indianapolis. For approximately 50 years, it operated as an Indianapolis city-wide chapter, based primarily at Butler University. By the late 1950s and early 1960s, Nu had more members and interest from Purdue University than from the Indianapolis schools. The Grand Board approved the move to Purdue University in 1968. In 2005, the university suspended the chapter until at least 2010 for a party that included underage drinking, fighting, and possession of drugs and weapons.)
Xi	December 27, 1920	Howard University	Washington, D.C.	Active	
Omicron	February 27, 1921	Columbia University	New York City, New York	Active	
Pi	April 23, 1921	Morehouse College	Atlanta, Georgia	Active	
Rho	November 6, 1921 – xxxx ?; 2018	Washburn University	Topeka, Kansas	Active	
Sigma	February 22, 1922	University of Michigan	Ann Arbor, Michigan	Active	
Tau	January 26, 1923	West Virginia State University	Institute, West Virginia	Active	(Note: Chapter formed at West Virginia Collegiate Institute, which became West Virginia State College in 1929 and West Virginia State University in 2004.)
Upsilon	April 25, 1923	University of California, Los Angeles	Los Angeles, California	Active	(Note: Chapter formed at the Southern Branch of the University of California, now UCLA. In the 1920s, the chapter initiated students from Chapman College, the University of California, Berkeley. At various times in its history, the chapter included University of California, Santa Barbara; University of California, Irvine; California State University, Los Angeles; California State University, Northridge; Loyola Marymount University; and Whittier College.)
Phi	January 19, 1924	University at Buffalo	Buffalo, New York	Active	(Note: This is a citywide chapter.)
Chi	February 15, 1924 – 1951; 19xx ?	Boston University	Boston, Massachusetts	Active	
Psi	April 19, 1924 – 1925; 19xx ?	University of Minnesota	Minneapolis, Minnesota	Active	
Omega	November 28, 1925	Drake University	Des Moines, Iowa	Active	(Note: Chapter was originally chartered at Drake University and became a joint chapter with Iowa State University in 1956.)
Omega	November 28, 1925	Iowa State University	Ames, Iowa	Active	(Note: Chapter was originally chartered at Drake University and became a joint chapter with Iowa State University in 1956.)
Alpha Beta	January 28, 1927	Wayne State University	Detroit, Michigan	Active	(Note: Chapter formed from the Strollers Club at the University of Detroit, now University of Detroit Mercy, and the College of the City of Detroit, which became Wayne University in 1934 and Wayne State University in 1956.)
Alpha Beta	January 28, 1927	University of Detroit Mercy	Detroit, Michigan	Active	(Note: Chapter formed from the Strollers Club at the University of Detroit, now University of Detroit Mercy, and the College of the City of Detroit, which became Wayne University in 1934 and Wayne State University in 1956.)
Alpha Gamma	April 9, 1927	Virginia Union University	Richmond, Virginia	Active	
Alpha Delta	December 3, 1927	Fisk University	Nashville, Tennessee	Active	
Alpha Epsilon	December 10, 1927	Johnson C. Smith University	Charlotte, North Carolina	Active	
Alpha Zeta	December 28, 1928	Indiana State University	Terre Haute, Indiana	Active	
Alpha Eta	September 9, 1929 – xxxx ?; 20xx ?	University of Nebraska Omaha	Omaha, Nebraska	Active	(Note: The chapter was chartered at both Creighton College, now Creighton University, and the University of Omaha, now the University of Nebraska Omaha.)
Alpha Eta	September 9, 1929 – xxxx ?; 20xx ?	Creighton University	Omaha, Nebraska	Active	(Note: The chapter was chartered at both Creighton College, now Creighton University, and the University of Omaha, now the University of Nebraska Omaha.)
Alpha Theta	May 23, 1931	Tennessee State University	Nashville, Tennessee	Active	
Alpha Iota	May 29, 1931 – 2013; 20xx ?	Morgan State University	Baltimore, Maryland	Active	(Note: In 2013, the university suspended the chapter until 2015 for allegations of discrimination against a gay student.)
Alpha Kappa	June 1, 1931	North Carolina Central University	Durham, North Carolina	Active	
Alpha Lambda	December 5, 1931	South Carolina State University	Orangeburg, South Carolina	Active	
Alpha Mu (see Rho Eta)	February 7, 1932 – 197x ?; 2023	Lincoln University	Jefferson City, Missouri	Active	(Note: After going inactive, the chapter was re-established as the Rho Eta chapter in 2013. When that chapter closed, it was reactivated as Alpha Mu.)
Alpha Nu	April 14, 1933	North Carolina A&T State University	Greensboro, North Carolina	Active	
Alpha Xi	May 14, 1933 – March 2006; 2013	Florida A&M University	Tallahassee, Florida	Active	(Note: In 2006, the chapter was suspended for hazing until 2013.)
Alpha Omicron (First)	June 14, 1933 – 1951	Louisville Municipal College	Louisville, Kentucky	Moved	(Note: Louisville Municipal College was a Black liberal arts college under the administration of the University of Louisville's Board of Trustees. The college closed after the University of Louisville desegregated in 1955. At that time, the chapter's charter was transferred to the University of Louisville.)
Alpha Pi	October 28, 1933	Langston University	Langston, Oklahoma	Active	(Note: Chapter formed at the Colored Agricultural and Normal University, which became Langston University in 1941.)
Alpha Rho	June 19, 1934 – 1940	Lewis Institute	Chicago, Illinois	Inactive	(Note: Chapter went inactive when the Lewis Institute merged to form the Illinois Institute of Technology.)
Alpha Sigma	February 22, 1935	Southern University	Baton Rouge, Louisiana	Active	
Alpha Tau	February 23, 1935	Bluefield State University	Bluefield, West Virginia	Active	(Note: Chapter formed at Bluefield State Teachers College, which became Bluefield State College in 1943 and Bluefield State University in 2022.)
Alpha Upsilon	March 1, 1935	Kentucky State University	Frankfort, Kentucky	Active	(Note: Chapter formed at Kentucky State Industrial College for Colored Persons, now Kentucky State College.)
Alpha Phi	March 30, 1935 – 2019; 20xx ?	Virginia State University	Petersburg, Virginia	Active	(Note: In 2019, the university suspended the chapter for hazing.)
Alpha Chi	April 4, 1935	Wiley University	Marshall, Texas	Active	
Alpha Psi	May 16, 1936	Pittsburg State University	Pittsburg, Kansas	Active	(Note: Chapter formed at Kansas State Teachers College of Pittsburg, now Pittsburg State University.)
Alpha Omega	June 6, 1936 –19xx ?; November 20, 1971	Cleveland State University	Cleveland, Ohio	Active	(Note: This is a citywide chapter that is based at Cleveland State University. It was originally established at Western Reserve University, now Case Western Reserve University. Balwin Wallace was previously part of the Iota Nu chapter.)
Alpha Omega	June 6, 1936 –19xx ?; November 20, 1971	John Carroll University	University Heights, Ohio	Active	(Note: This is a citywide chapter that is based at Cleveland State University. It was originally established at Western Reserve University, now Case Western Reserve University. Balwin Wallace was previously part of the Iota Nu chapter.)
Alpha Omega	June 6, 1936 –19xx ?; November 20, 1971	Notre Dame College	South Euclid, Ohio	Active	(Note: This is a citywide chapter that is based at Cleveland State University. It was originally established at Western Reserve University, now Case Western Reserve University. Balwin Wallace was previously part of the Iota Nu chapter.)
Alpha Omega	June 6, 1936 –19xx ?; November 20, 1971	Baldwin Wallace University	Berea, Ohio	Active	(Note: This is a citywide chapter that is based at Cleveland State University. It was originally established at Western Reserve University, now Case Western Reserve University. Balwin Wallace was previously part of the Iota Nu chapter.)
Alpha Omega	June 6, 1936 –19xx ?; November 20, 1971	Lake Erie College	Painesville, Ohio	Active	(Note: This is a citywide chapter that is based at Cleveland State University. It was originally established at Western Reserve University, now Case Western Reserve University. Balwin Wallace was previously part of the Iota Nu chapter.)
Alpha Omega	June 6, 1936 –19xx ?; November 20, 1971	College of Wooster	Wooster, Ohio	Active	(Note: This is a citywide chapter that is based at Cleveland State University. It was originally established at Western Reserve University, now Case Western Reserve University. Balwin Wallace was previously part of the Iota Nu chapter.)
Beta Beta	February 27, 1937	Texas College	Tyler, Texas	Active	
Beta Gamma	April 16, 1937	Dillard University	New Orleans, Louisiana	Active	
Beta Delta	May 1, 1937 – 1951; 1955	Morris Brown College	Atlanta, Georgia	Active	
Beta Epsilon	September 19, 1937	University of Pittsburgh	Pittsburgh, Pennsylvania	Active	
Beta Zeta	May 7, 1938	Alabama State University	Montgomery, Alabama	Active	
Beta Eta	May 20, 1939	University of Cincinnati	Cincinnati, Ohio	Active	
Beta Theta	May 29, 1939	University of Colorado Boulder	Boulder, Colorado	Active	(Note: Formed as a "hybrid" chapter that included both undergraduate and alumni members until Denver Alumni was chartered fifteen years later.)
Beta Iota	November 3, 1939 – 1953; 19xx ?	Xavier University of Louisiana	New Orleans, Louisiana	Active	
Beta Kappa	February 21, 1940	University of the District of Columbia	Washington, D.C.	Active	
Beta Lambda	April 20, 1940	Lane College	Jackson, Tennessee	Active	
Beta Mu	April 20, 1940	LeMoyne–Owen College	Memphis, Tennessee	Active	
Beta Nu	February 7, 1942	St. Louis University	St. Louis, Missouri	Active	(Note: Chapter was chartered at Stowe Teachers College, now Harris–Stowe State University. It is currently a citywide chapter. The chapter includes Webster University until February 2025.)
Beta Nu	February 7, 1942	Harris–Stowe State University	St. Louis, Missouri	Active	(Note: Chapter was chartered at Stowe Teachers College, now Harris–Stowe State University. It is currently a citywide chapter. The chapter includes Webster University until February 2025.)
Beta Nu	February 7, 1942	University of Missouri–St. Louis	St. Louis, Missouri	Active	(Note: Chapter was chartered at Stowe Teachers College, now Harris–Stowe State University. It is currently a citywide chapter. The chapter includes Webster University until February 2025.)
Beta Nu	February 7, 1942	Washington University in St. Louis	St. Louis, Missouri	Active	(Note: Chapter was chartered at Stowe Teachers College, now Harris–Stowe State University. It is currently a citywide chapter. The chapter includes Webster University until February 2025.)
Beta Nu	February 7, 1942	Lindenwood University	St. Charles, Missouri	Active	(Note: Chapter was chartered at Stowe Teachers College, now Harris–Stowe State University. It is currently a citywide chapter. The chapter includes Webster University until February 2025.)
Beta Xi	June 6, 1942	University of Toledo	Toledo, Ohio	Active	
Beta Omicron	April 22, 1946 – 1952; 19xx ?	University of Wisconsin–Madison	Madison, Wisconsin	Active	
Beta Pi	May 5, 1946 – 2012	Youngstown State University	Youngstown, Ohio	Inactive	(Note: Chapter formed at Youngstown College, now Youngstown State University. In 2012, the university suspended the chapter for fifteen years for hazing, making it eligible to return to campus in 2027.)
Beta Rho	March 1, 1947	Allen University	Columbia, South Carolina	Active	
Beta Sigma (see Pi Eta)	March 8, 1947 – xxxx ?	Delaware State University	Dover, Delaware	Re-established	(Note: Chapter formed at Delaware State College, now Delaware State University. After going inactive, the chapter was re-established as the Pi Eta chapter in 2007.)
Beta Tau	March 15, 1947	Philander Smith University	Little Rock, Arkansas	Active	
Beta Upsilon	March 15, 1947	Texas Southern University	Houston, Texas	Active	(Note: Chapter formed at Texas State University for Negroes, now Texas Southern University.)
Beta Phi	March 17, 1947	Knoxville College	Knoxville, Tennessee	Active	
Beta Chi	April 19, 1947	Hampton University	Hampton, Virginia	Active	(Note: Chapter formed at Hampton Institute, now Hampton University.)
Beta Psi	May 17, 1947 – May 1998; 200x ?	Kansas State University	Manhattan, Kansas	Active	(Note: In 1998, the chapter was suspended until May 25, 2008, for hazing.)
Beta Omega	July 12, 1947	University of Southern California	Los Angeles, California	Active	(Note: Chapter formed at the University of Southern California.)
Beta Omega	July 12, 1947	Loyola Marymount University	Los Angeles, California	Active	(Note: Chapter formed at the University of Southern California.)
Beta Omega	July 12, 1947	Pepperdine University	Malibu, California	Active	(Note: Chapter formed at the University of Southern California.)
Gamma Alpha	October 23, 1947	University of California, Berkeley	Berkeley, California	Active	(Note: The chapter was chartered at the University of California.)
Gamma Alpha	October 23, 1947	San Francisco State University	San Francisco, California	Active	(Note: The chapter was chartered at the University of California.)
Gamma Alpha	October 23, 1947	University of San Francisco	San Francisco, California	Active	(Note: The chapter was chartered at the University of California.)
Gamma Beta	June 30, 1948	Western Michigan University	Kalamazoo, Michigan	Active	(Note: Chapter formed at Western State Normal School, now Western Michigan University.)
Gamma Gamma	February 27, 1948	Talladega College	Talladega, Alabama	Active	
Gamma Delta	March 6, 1948 – 1953; 19xx ?	Livingstone College	Salisbury, North Carolina	Active	
Gamma Epsilon	April 14, 1948 – October 1981; 20xx ?	Tuskegee University	Tuskegee, Alabama	Active	(Note: Chapter formed at Tuskegee Institute, now Tuskegee University. The university suspended the chapter in 1991 for hazing.)
Gamma Zeta	May 15, 1948 – November 22, 1989; xxxx ?	Fort Valley State University	Fort Valley, Georgia	Active	(Note: Chapter formed at Fort Valley State College, now Fort Valley State University. In 1989, the chapter was suspended for hazing.)
Gamma Eta	May 22, 1948	University of Washington	Seattle, Washington	Active	
Gamma Theta	May 22, 1948	Bethune–Cookman University	Daytona Beach, Florida	Active	(Note: Chapter formed at Bethune-Cookman College, now Bethune-Cookman University.)
Gamma Iota	July 9, 1948	Arizona State University	Tempe, Arizona	Active	
Gamma Kappa	November 23, 1948 – 1952; 1956	Clark Atlanta University	Atlanta, Georgia	Active	(Note: Chapter formed at Clark College, now Clark Atlanta University.)
Gamma Lambda	February 12, 1949	Huston–Tillotson University	Austin, Texas	Active	(Note: Chapter formed at Tillotson College, which merged with Samuel Huston College to form Huston–Tillotson College, now Huston–Tillotson University.)
Gamma Mu	February 25, 1949	Benedict College	Columbia, South Carolina	Active	
Gamma Nu	February 25, 1949	Claflin University	Orangeburg, South Carolina	Active	
Gamma Xi (see Pi Nu)	April 2, 1949 – 1998	University of Maryland Eastern Shore	Princess Anne, Maryland	Re-established	(Note: Chapter formed at Maryland State College, which became the University of Maryland Eastern Shore in 1970. In 1998, the chapter was suspended for hazing. It was re-established as the Pi Nu chapter in 2008.)
Gamma Omicron	April 2, 1949	Saint Augustine's University	Raleigh, North Carolina	Active	
Gamma Pi	April 9, 1949	Alcorn State University	Lorman, Mississippi	Active	
Gamma Rho	April 16, 1949	Tougaloo College	Jackson, Mississippi	Active	
Gamma Sigma	April 30, 1949	University of Arkansas at Pine Bluff	Pine Bluff, Arkansas	Active	
Gamma Tau	May 15, 1949 – 2013; 2017	Kent State University	Kent, Ohio	Active	(Note: Chapter formed from the Strollers Club, established in 1948. In 2013, the university suspended the chapter for three years for hazing.)
Gamma Upsilon	March 4, 1950 – October 2012; 20xx ?	Southern Illinois University Carbondale	Carbondale, Illinois	Active	(Note: In 2012, the university suspended the chapter until 2015 for low grade point averages.)
Gamma Phi	April 22, 1950 – 1990; xxxx ?	Alabama A&M University	Huntsville, Alabama	Active	(Note: In 1991, the chapter was suspended for one year for hazing.)
Gamma Chi	April 29, 1950	Savannah State University	Savannah, Georgia	Active	(Note: Chapter formed at Savannah State College, which became Savannah State University in 1996.)
Gamma Psi	May 24, 1950	Grambling State University	Grambling, Louisiana	Active	(Note: Chapter formed at Grambling College, now Grambling State University.)
Gamma Omega	May 26, 1950	Cheyney University	Cheyney, Pennsylvania	Active	(Note: Chapter formed at Cheyney Training School for Teachers, now Cheyney University.)
Delta Alpha	December 9, 1950	University of Oregon	Eugene, Oregon	Active	(Note: The chapter was chartered at the University of Oregon, but is currently a citywide chapter.)
Delta Alpha	December 9, 1950	Portland State University	Portland, Oregon	Active	(Note: The chapter was chartered at the University of Oregon, but is currently a citywide chapter.)
Delta Alpha	December 9, 1950	University of Portland	Portland, Oregon	Active	(Note: The chapter was chartered at the University of Oregon, but is currently a citywide chapter.)
Delta Alpha	December 9, 1950	Lewis & Clark College	Portland, Oregon	Active	(Note: The chapter was chartered at the University of Oregon, but is currently a citywide chapter.)
Delta Alpha	December 9, 1950	Warner Pacific University	Portland, Oregon	Active	(Note: The chapter was chartered at the University of Oregon, but is currently a citywide chapter.)
Delta Alpha	December 9, 1950	Willamette University	Salem, Oregon	Active	(Note: The chapter was chartered at the University of Oregon, but is currently a citywide chapter.)
Alpha Omicron (Second)	March 14, 1951	University of Louisville	Louisville, Kentucky	Active	
Delta Beta	April 27, 1951	Syracuse University	Syracuse, New York	Active	
Delta Beta	April 27, 1951	State University of New York at Cortland	Cortland, New York	Active	
Delta Gamma	April 28, 1951	Shaw University	Raleigh, North Carolina	Active	
Delta Delta	May 6, 1951	Jackson State University	Jackson, Mississippi	Active	
Delta Epsilon	March 26, 1951	San Diego State University	San Diego, California	Active	
Delta Zeta	March 14, 1952	Central State University	Wilberforce, Ohio	Active	
Delta Eta	February 11, 1952	University of Pennsylvania	Philadelphia, Pennsylvania	Active	(Note: This citywide chapter was chartered at the University of Pennsylvania.)
Delta Eta	February 11, 1952	Drexel University	Philadelphia, Pennsylvania	Active	(Note: This citywide chapter was chartered at the University of Pennsylvania.)
Delta Eta	February 11, 1952	La Salle University	Philadelphia, Pennsylvania	Active	(Note: This citywide chapter was chartered at the University of Pennsylvania.)
Delta Eta	February 11, 1952	Saint Joseph's University	Philadelphia, Pennsylvania	Active	(Note: This citywide chapter was chartered at the University of Pennsylvania.)
Delta Eta	February 11, 1952	Villanova University	Villanova, Pennsylvania	Active	(Note: This citywide chapter was chartered at the University of Pennsylvania.)
Delta Theta	May 17, 1952 – September 19, 2024	Pennsylvania State University	University Park, Pennsylvania	Inactive	(Note: Chapter formed at Pennsylvania State College, now Pennsylvania State University. In 2023, the chapter was suspended for hazing by the Penn State Office of Student Accountability and Conflict Response through September 11, 2027.)
Delta Iota	February 22, 1953 – November 1984; 19xx ?–2001	Ball State University	Muncie, Indiana	Inactive	(Note: In 1984, the chapter was suspended hazing until the fall of 1987. After being re-established, the chapter was again suspended for hazing in 2001 until 2006.)
Delta Kappa	February 9, 1954	Marquette University	Milwaukee, Wisconsin	Active	(Note: Chapter was chartered at the Wisconsin State College of Milwaukee, now the University of Wisconsin–Milwaukee. It is now a citywide chapter based at Marquette University. It included Cardinal Stritch University until that institution closed in 2023.)
Delta Kappa	February 9, 1954	University of Wisconsin–Milwaukee	Milwaukee, Wisconsin	Active	(Note: Chapter was chartered at the Wisconsin State College of Milwaukee, now the University of Wisconsin–Milwaukee. It is now a citywide chapter based at Marquette University. It included Cardinal Stritch University until that institution closed in 2023.)
Delta Kappa	February 9, 1954	University of Wisconsin–Parkside	Kenosha, Wisconsin	Active	(Note: Chapter was chartered at the Wisconsin State College of Milwaukee, now the University of Wisconsin–Milwaukee. It is now a citywide chapter based at Marquette University. It included Cardinal Stritch University until that institution closed in 2023.)
Delta Lambda	December 17, 1954 – 2013	Saint Paul's College	Lawrenceville, Virginia	Inactive	(Note: Chapter went inactive when the college ceased operations in 2013)
Delta Mu	April 22, 1955	LIU Brooklyn	Brooklyn, New York	Inactive	(Note: Chapter formed at Long Island University Brooklyn, now called LIU Brooklyn.)
Delta Nu	May 7, 1955	Eastern Michigan University	Ypsilanti, Michigan	Active	(Note: Chapter formed at Michigan State Normal College, now Eastern Michigan University.)
Delta Xi	May 19, 1956	Albany State University	Albany, Georgia	Active	(Note: Chapter formed at Albany State College, now Albany State University.)
Delta Omicron	May 26, 1956	University of Arizona	Tucson, Arizona	Active	
Delta Pi	May 26, 1956	Michigan State University	East Lansing, Michigan	Active	
Delta Rho	June 16, 1956	San Jose State University	San Jose, California	Active	
Delta Sigma	December 8, 1956 – 1988	Bishop College	Dallas, Texas	Inactive	(Note: Chapter formed at the Marshall, Texas campus; the college moved to Dallas in 1961. The chapter went inactive when the college closed.)
Delta Tau	October 29, 1957	Miles College	Birmingham, Alabama	Active	
Delta Upsilon	September 6, 1958	Wichita State University	Wichita, Kansas	Active	(Note: Chapter formed at Municipal University of Wichita, now Wichita State University.)
Delta Phi	December 13, 1958	Indiana Institute of Technology	Fort Wayne, Indiana	Active	
Delta Chi	December 9, 1960	Winston-Salem State University	Winston-Salem, North Carolina	Active	(Note: Chapter formed at Winston-Salem Teachers College, now Winston-Salem State University.)
Delta Psi	December 12, 1960 – 1990, xxxx ?	Edward Waters University	Jacksonville, Florida	Active	(Note: In 1990, the chapter was suspended for one year for hazing.)
Delta Omega	March 18, 1961	University of Missouri	Columbia, Missouri	Active	
Epsilon Alpha	April 22, 1961	Elizabeth City State University	Elizabeth City, North Carolina	Active	
Epsilon Beta	April 14, 1962	Fayetteville State University	Fayetteville, North Carolina	Active	
Epsilon Gamma	February 23, 1963 – xxxx ?; 20xx ?	University of Central Oklahoma	Edmond, Oklahoma	Active	(Note: Chapter formed at Central State College, now University of Central Oklahoma. At one point, it was a metropolitan chapter for Oklahoma City, but it had its charter revoked.)
Epsilon Delta	May 2, 1962	Marshall University	Huntington, West Virginia	Active	
Epsilon Epsilon	May 4, 1963	Stillman College	Tuscaloosa, Alabama	Active	
Epsilon Zeta	May 10, 1963	Norfolk State University	Norfolk, Virginia	Active	
Epsilon Eta	May 18, 1963	Truman State University	Kirksville, Missouri	Active	(Note: Chapter formed at Northeast Missouri State Teachers College, now Truman State University.)
Epsilon Theta	May 20, 1964	Idaho State University	Pocatello, Idaho	Active	
Epsilon Iota	April 2, 1965	University of Evansville	Evansville, Indiana	Active	
Epsilon Kappa	December 19, 1965	California State University, Long Beach	Long Beach, California	Active	(Note: Chapter formed at California State College at Long Beach, now California State University, Long Beach.)
Epsilon Lambda	May 5, 1966	Ohio University	Athens, Ohio	Active	
Epsilon Mu	April 30, 1966	Florida Memorial University	Miami Gardens, Florida	Active	(Note: Chapter formed at Florida Memorial College, now Florida Memorial University.)
Epsilon Nu	March 29, 1968	Southern University at New Orleans	New Orleans, Louisiana	Active	
Epsilon Xi	April 27, 1968	Northern Michigan University	Marquette, Michigan	Active	
Epsilon Omicron	April 24, 1968 – 1970s; 2016	Northern Illinois University	DeKalb, Illinois	Active	
Epsilon Pi	May 4, 1968	West Texas A&M University	Canyon, Texas	Active	(Note: Chapter formed from the Stroller Club (local) at West Texas State University, now West Texas A&M University.)
Epsilon Rho	May 10, 1969 – 2001; 20xx ?	Western Kentucky University	Bowling Green, Kentucky	Active	(Note: In 2001, the chapter was suspended for five years for hazing.)
Epsilon Sigma	May 9, 1969	Bowie State University	Bowie, Maryland	Active	
Epsilon Tau	May 23, 1969	Ferris State University	Big Rapids, Michigan	Active	
Epsilon Upsilon	May 24, 1969 – xxxx ?	Northern Arizona University	Flagstaff, Arizona	Inactive	
Epsilon Phi	November 2, 1969	McNeese State University	Lake Charles, Louisiana	Active	
Epsilon Chi	March 21, 1970	West Virginia University	Morgantown, West Virginia	Active	
Epsilon Psi	April 4, 1970	Paine College	Augusta, Georgia	Active	
Epsilon Omega	May 24, 1970	Voorhees University	Denmark, South Carolina	Active	(Note: Chapter formed at Voorhees College, now Voorhees University.)
Zeta Alpha	May 15, 1970	Indiana University Northwest	Gary, Indiana	Active	
Zeta Beta	May 15, 1970	Prairie View A&M University	Prairie View, Texas	Active	
Zeta Gamma	August 1, 1970	Coppin State University	Baltimore, Maryland	Active	(Note: Chapter formed at Coppin State College, now Coppin State University.)
Zeta Delta	August 1, 1970	University of North Carolina at Charlotte	Charlotte, North Carolina	Active	
Zeta Epsilon	September 25, 1970	University of South Carolina	Columbia, South Carolina	Active	
Zeta Zeta	November 14, 1970	Mississippi Valley State University	Itta Bena, Mississippi	Active	
Zeta Eta	March 13, 1971	PennWest California	California, Pennsylvania	Active	(Note: Chapter formed at California State College, later called California University of Pennsylvania, which merged in 2021 with two other universities to become part of Pennsylvania Western University.)
Zeta Theta	April 3, 1971	Oklahoma State University	Stillwater, Oklahoma	Active	
Zeta Iota	April 16, 1971 – August 2014; August 2017	University of Georgia	Athens, Georgia	Active	(Note: In 2014, the university suspended the chapter until January 2017 for hazing.)
Zeta Kappa	April 16, 1971	University of Tennessee at Martin	Martin, Tennessee	Active	
Zeta Lambda	April 16, 1971	Morehead State University	Morehead, Kentucky	Active	
Zeta Mu	October 30, 1971	Western Illinois University	Macomb, Illinois	Active	
Zeta Nu	November 14, 1971	Bowling Green State University	Bowling Green, Ohio	Active	
Zeta Xi	November 20, 1971	Jarvis Christian University	Hawkins, Texas	Active	(Note: Chapter formed at Jarvis Christian College, now Jarvis Christian University.)
Zeta Omicron	January 21, 1972	Rust College	Holly Springs, Mississippi	Active	
Zeta Pi	February 19, 1972	Southern Illinois University Edwardsville	Edwardsville, Illinois	Active	
Zeta Rho	February 26, 1972	Northeastern State University	Tahlequah, Oklahoma	Active	(Note: Chapter formed at Northeastern State Normal School, now Northeastern State University.)
Zeta Sigma	March 11, 1972	Barber–Scotia College	Concord, North Carolina	Active	
Zeta Tau	March 13, 1972	University of Central Missouri	Warrensburg, Missouri	Active	(Note: Chapter formed at the Central Missouri State University, which became the University of Central Missouri in 2006.)
Zeta Upsilon	March 20, 1972	University of North Texas	Denton, Texas	Active	(Note: Chapter formed at North Texas State University, which became the University of North Texas in 1989.)
Zeta Phi	March 22, 1972 – 1991; xxxx ?	University of Florida	Gainesville, Florida	Active	(Note: In 1991, the chapter was suspended until 1993 for fighting with members of Phi Beta Sigma.)
Zeta Chi	April 6, 1973	University of South Florida	Tampa, Florida	Active	
Zeta Psi	April 6, 1973 – October 1993; xxxx ?	Lamar University	Beaumont, Texas	Active	(Note: In 1993, the chapter was suspended for two years for hazing.)
Zeta Omega	April 14, 1973	University of Oklahoma	Norman, Oklahoma	Active	
Eta Alpha	April 14, 1973 – 1988; xxxx ?	Eastern Kentucky University	Richmond, Kentucky	Active	(Note: The chapter was suspended in 1988 for hazing.)
Eta Beta	April 8, 1973	Murray State University	Murray, Kentucky	Active	
Eta Gamma	December 9, 1973	Middle Tennessee State University	Murfreesboro, Tennessee	Active	
Eta Delta (see Xi Delta (First))	February 8, 1974	The College of New Jersey	Trenton, New Jersey	Active	(Note: The chapter was chartered at Trenton State College, now The College of New Jersey. Princeton was originally under the Xi Delta (First) chapter.)
Eta Delta (see Xi Delta (First))	February 8, 1974	Princeton University	Princeton, New Jersey	Active	(Note: The chapter was chartered at Trenton State College, now The College of New Jersey. Princeton was originally under the Xi Delta (First) chapter.)
Eta Epsilon	March 9, 1974	Rutgers University–New Brunswick	New Brunswick, New Jersey	Active	
Eta Zeta	March 22, 1974	University of California, Riverside	Riverside, California	Active	
Eta Eta	March 29, 1974	Kettering University	Flint, Michigan	Active	(Note: Chapter formed at General Motors Institute, later known as GMI Engineering & Management Institute and now Kettering University.)
Eta Theta	April 11, 1974	Columbus State University	Columbus, Georgia	Active	(Note: Chapter formed at Columbus College, now Columbus State University.)
Eta Iota	April 19, 1974	College of Charleston	Charleston, South Carolina	Active	
Eta Kappa	May 3, 1974 – 1997; 20xx ?	Culver–Stockton College	Canton, Missouri	Active	(Note: The chapter relinquished its charter in 1997.)
Eta Lambda	May 5, 1974	University of Houston	Houston, Texas	Active	
Eta Mu	May 17, 1974	Jacksonville State University	Jacksonville, Alabama	Active	
Eta Nu	May 19, 1974 – December 9, 2005; 20xx ?	University of South Alabama	Mobile, Alabama	Active	(Note: In 2005, the chapter was indefinitely suspended for hazing.)
Eta Xi	October 19, 1974	Virginia Commonwealth University	Richmond, Virginia	Active	
Eta Omicron	November 1, 1974	Cameron University	Lawton, Oklahoma	Inactive	(Note: Chapter formed at Cameron State School of Agriculture, now Cameron University.)
Eta Pi	November 23, 1974	University of Louisiana at Monroe	Monroe, Louisiana	Active	(Note: Chapter formed at Northeast Louisiana University, now University of Louisiana at Monroe.)
Eta Rho	November 23, 1974	Central Michigan University	Mount Pleasant, Michigan	Active	
Eta Sigma	December 7, 1974	University of Virginia	Charlottesville, Virginia	Active	
Eta Tau	December 9, 1974	Texas A&M University–Kingsville	Kingsville, Texas	Active	(Note: Chapter formed at Texas A&I University, now Texas A&M University–Kingsville.)
Eta Upsilon	January 22, 1974	Mississippi State University	Starkville, Mississippi	Active	
Eta Phi	February 1, 1975	East Texas A&M University	Commerce, Texas	Active	(Note: Chapter formed at East Texas State University, now East Texas A&M University.)
Eta Chi	February 8, 1975 – June 2003; 20xx ?	University of Alabama	Tuscaloosa, Alabama	Active	(Note: In 2003, the university and the national fraternity suspended the chapter for two years, until the spring of 2005, for hazing.)
Eta Psi	February 23, 1975	East Carolina University	Greenville, North Carolina	Active	
Eta Omega	December 23, 1975 – 2001; 20xx ?	Old Dominion University	Norfolk, Virginia	Active	(Note: In 2001, the chapter was closed for hazing.)
Theta Alpha	March 15, 1975	Henderson State University	Arkadelphia, Arkansas	Active	
Theta Beta	March 3, 1975	Austin Peay State University	Clarksville, Tennessee	Active	
Theta Gamma	May 18, 1975	Eastern Illinois University	Charleston, Illinois	Active	
Theta Delta	May 18, 1975 – 1992; 19xx ?	Auburn University	Auburn, Alabama	Active	(Note: The university suspended the chapter in 1992 for hazing. It was invited to return to the university in 1995.)
Theta Epsilon	May 24, 1975	University of Arkansas at Little Rock	Little Rock, Arkansas	Active	
Theta Zeta	June 1, 1975	Chicago State University	Chicago, Illinois	Inactive	
Theta Eta	September 21, 1975	Florida State University	Tallahassee, Florida	Active	
Theta Theta	September 21, 1975 – February 12, 1999; 20xx ?	University of Maryland, College Park	College Park, Maryland	Active	(Note: The university suspended the chapter indefinitely for hazing.)
Theta Iota	October 11, 1975	Massachusetts Institute of Technology	Cambridge, Massachusetts	Active	(Note: The chapter previously included Dartmouth College (now Mu Chi chapter), Harvard University, Tufts University, the University of Connecticut (now Nu Psi chapter), and the University of Massachusetts at Amherst (now Nu Tau chapter).)
Theta Kappa	November 18, 1975	University of West Georgia	Carrollton, Georgia	Active	(Note: Chapter formed from West Georgia College, now University of West Georgia.)
Theta Lambda	November 18, 1975 – February 1990; xxxx ?	Northwestern State University	Natchitoches, Louisiana	Active	(Note: In 1990, the chapter was suspended for two years for hazing.)
Theta Mu	December 11, 1975	Arkansas State University	Jonesboro, Arkansas	Active	
Theta Nu	December 14, 1975 – 2005; 20xx ?	University of Louisiana at Lafayette	Lafayette, Louisiana	Active	(Note: Chapter formed at the University of Southwestern Louisiana, now the University of Louisiana at Lafayette. In 2005, the university suspended the chapter until the spring of 2006 for hazing and holding unregistered events after midnight.)
Theta Xi	March 5, 1976	University of Texas at El Paso	El Paso, Texas	Active	
Theta Omicron	May 8, 1976	University of North Carolina at Chapel Hill	Chapel Hill, North Carolina	Active	
Theta Pi	May 15, 1976 – March 2025	Mercer University	Macon, Georgia	Inactive	(Note: In 2025, the university indefinitely suspended the chapter for hazing and assault incidents that took place between November 2024 and February 2025.)
Theta Rho (see Pi Delta)	May 16, 1976 – 1994	Louisiana Tech University	Ruston, Louisiana	Re-established	(Note: In 1994, the chapter was suspended by the university and the charter revoked by the national fraternity for hazing. It was re-established as the Pi Delta chapter in 2007.)
Theta Sigma	June 5, 1976	University of Nevada, Las Vegas	Las Vegas, Nevada	Active	
Theta Tau	June 5, 1976	Howard University Graduate School	Washington, D.C.	Active	(Note: This was the second "intermediate chapter" to be established. Its members are graduate and professional school students enrolled in programs at universities within the greater Washington, D.C. metropolitan area.)
Theta Upsilon	October 10, 1976 – 1991; xxxx ?	University of North Alabama	Florence, Alabama	Active	(Note: In 1991, the chapter was suspended for hazing for two years.)
Theta Phi	November 21, 1976	Troy University	Troy, Alabama	Active	(Note: Chartered at Troy State University, which became Troy University in 2005.)
Theta Chi	December 19, 1976	University of Maryland, Baltimore County	Baltimore, Maryland	Active	
Theta Psi	January 4, 1977 – May 31, 2019; 202x ?	Virginia Tech	Blacksburg, Virginia	Active	(Note: Chartered at Virginia Tech in 1977, this chapter also included Radford University for a time.)
Theta Omega	September 18, 1977	New Mexico State University	Las Cruces, New Mexico	Active	
Iota Alpha	November 12, 1977	University of Texas at Arlington	Arlington, Texas	Active	
Iota Beta	November 19, 1977	California State University, Sacramento	Sacramento, California	Active	
Iota Gamma	November 19, 1977 – November 1992; xxxx ?	University of Central Arkansas	Conway, Arkansas	Active	(Note: In 1992, the chapter was suspended for hazing until January 1994.)
Iota Delta	December 3, 1977	University of Texas at Austin	Austin, Texas	Active	
Iota Epsilon	March 4, 1978 – xxxx ?	Montclair State University	Upper Montclair, New Jersey	Inactive	(Note: Chapter formed at Montclair State College, now Montclair State University.)
Iota Zeta	April 1, 1978	East Tennessee State University	Johnson City, Tennessee	Active	
Iota Eta	April 4, 1978	West Virginia University Institute of Technology	Beckley, West Virginia	Active	(Note: Chapter formed at West Virginia Institute of Technology, now West Virginia University Institute of Technology)
Iota Theta	May 21, 1978	University of West Alabama	Livingston, Alabama	Active	(Note: Chapter formed at Livingston University, now the University of West Alabama.)
Iota Iota	June 3, 1978	Oregon State University	Corvallis, Oregon	Active	
Iota Kappa	October 8, 1978	Bradley University	Peoria, Illinois	Active	
Iota Lambda	October 8, 1978	Lewis University	Romeoville, Illinois	Active	
Iota Mu	October 21, 1978	University of Dayton	Dayton, Ohio	Active	
Iota Nu	January 12, 1979	Baldwin Wallace University	Berea, Ohio	Consolidated	(Note: Chapter formed at Baldwin–Wallace College, now Baldwin Wallace University. Balwin Wallace is now part of the Alpha Omega chapter.)
Iota Nu	January 12, 1979	Oberlin College	Oberlin, Ohio	Consolidated	(Note: Chapter formed at Baldwin–Wallace College, now Baldwin Wallace University. Balwin Wallace is now part of the Alpha Omega chapter.)
Iota Xi	February 10, 1979	Duke University	Durham, North Carolina	Active	
Iota Omicron	February 23, 1979 – September 15, 2014	Hofstra University	Hempstead, New York	Inactive	(Note: Chapter formed at the State University of New York College at Old Westbury, now called the State University of New York at Old Westbury. In 2014, the national fraternity placed a "moratorium on membership intake for the indefinite future" on the chapter over concerns that not all hazing issues had been addressed. Letter to Hofstra University, September 15, 2014)
Iota Pi (see Omicron Phi)	March 10, 1978 – xxxx ?	Georgia Southern University	Statesboro, Georgia	Re-established	(Note: Chapter formed at Georgia Southern College, now Georgia Southern University. It was re-established as the Omicron Phi chapter in 2005.)
Iota Rho	March 24, 1979 – xxxx ?	Fordham University	New York City, New York	Inactive	
Iota Sigma	April 4, 1979	University of California, Davis	Davis, California	Active	
Iota Tau	April 8, 1979 – 20xx ?; 20xx ?	University of Arkansas	Fayetteville, Arkansas	Active	(Note: Chapter was previously suspended.)
Iota Upsilon	September 1, 1979	Texas Tech University	Lubbock, Texas	Active	
Iota Phi	September 22, 1978 – August 2018; 202x ?	Cornell University	Ithaca, New York	Active	(Note: In 2018, the university revoked the chapter's recognition for at least two years for hazing.)
Iota Chi	December 5, 1979	University of Miami	Miami, Florida	Active	
Iota Psi	December 8, 1979	Salisbury University	Salisbury, Maryland	Active	(Note: Chapter formed at Salisbury State College, now Salisbury University.)
Iota Omega	February 23, 1980	Missouri University of Science and Technology	Rolla, Missouri	Active	(Note: Chapter formed at the University of Missouri-Rolla, now the Missouri University of Science and Technology.)
Kappa Alpha	March 16, 1980	Illinois State University	Normal, Illinois	Active	
Kappa Beta	March 22, 1980	University of Memphis	Memphis, Tennessee	Active	(Note: Chapter formed at Memphis State University, now the University of Memphis.)
Kappa Gamma	April 14, 1980	West Chester University	West Chester, Pennsylvania	Active	(Note: Chapter formed at West Chester State College, now West Chester University of Pennsylvania.)
Kappa Delta	April 26, 1980 – April 11, 2025	Miami University	Oxford, Ohio	Inactive	(Note: In 2025, the university suspended the chapter for fifteen years, until 2040, for hazing and endangering health and safety. The chapter had prior hazing cases in 2019 and 2022.)
Kappa Epsilon	May 3, 1980	Texas Christian University	Fort Worth, Texas	Active	
Kappa Zeta	June 7, 1980 – xxxx ?	Atlanta University Graduate Division	Atlanta, Georgia	Inactive	(Note: This was the fraternity's third "intermediate chapter", composed of graduate and professional school students enrolled in programs at universities within the Atlanta metropolitan area. It was established at Atlanta University, which only offered graduate degrees, now called Clark Atlanta University after a 1998 merger with Clark College.)
Kappa Eta	September 6, 1980	University of Arkansas at Monticello	Monticello, Arkansas	Active	
Kappa Theta	October 3, 1980	Georgia State University	Atlanta, Georgia	Active	
Kappa Iota	October 10, 1980	University of Southern Mississippi	Hattiesburg, Mississippi	Active	
Kappa Kappa	October 12, 1980	University of Alabama at Birmingham	Birmingham, Alabama	Active	
Kappa Lambda	October 15, 1980	Clemson University	Clemson, South Carolina	Active	
Kappa Mu	October 18, 1980	State University of New York at New Paltz	New Paltz, New York	Active	(Note: The chapter was chartered at the State University of New York College of Arts and Science New Paltz, now called State University of New York at New Paltz. Although this chapter is chartered at SUNY New Paltz, it also includes several other institutions.)
Kappa Mu	October 18, 1980	United States Military Academy	West Point, New York	Active	(Note: The chapter was chartered at the State University of New York College of Arts and Science New Paltz, now called State University of New York at New Paltz. Although this chapter is chartered at SUNY New Paltz, it also includes several other institutions.)
Kappa Mu	October 18, 1980	Mercy University	Dobbs Ferry, New York	Active	(Note: The chapter was chartered at the State University of New York College of Arts and Science New Paltz, now called State University of New York at New Paltz. Although this chapter is chartered at SUNY New Paltz, it also includes several other institutions.)
Kappa Mu	October 18, 1980	Marist University	Poughkeepsie, New York	Active	(Note: The chapter was chartered at the State University of New York College of Arts and Science New Paltz, now called State University of New York at New Paltz. Although this chapter is chartered at SUNY New Paltz, it also includes several other institutions.)
Kappa Mu	October 18, 1980	Pace University	Westchester County, New York	Active	(Note: The chapter was chartered at the State University of New York College of Arts and Science New Paltz, now called State University of New York at New Paltz. Although this chapter is chartered at SUNY New Paltz, it also includes several other institutions.)
Kappa Nu (see Rho Pi)	November 22, 1980 – 2002	Sam Houston State University	Huntsville, Texas	Re-established	(Note: Chapter was suspended in 2002 for hazing. Re-established as the Rho Pi chapter in 2019.)
Kappa Xi	December 12, 1980	North Carolina State University	Raleigh, North Carolina	Active	
Kappa Omicron	December 12, 1980	California State Polytechnic University, Pomona	Pomona, California	Active	(Note: Chapter was chartered at California State Polytechnic University and the University of LaVerne.)
Kappa Omicron	December 12, 1980	University of La Verne	La Verne, California	Active	(Note: Chapter was chartered at California State Polytechnic University and the University of LaVerne.)
Kappa Pi	December 19, 1980	Washington State University	Pullman, Washington	Active	
Kappa Rho	April 11, 1981	University at Albany	Albany, New York	Inactive	
Kappa Sigma	April 11, 1981	Western Carolina University	Cullowhee, North Carolina	Active	
Kappa Tau	April 11, 1981 – March 28, 2017; 202x ?	University of Kentucky	Lexington, Kentucky	Active	(Note: In 2017, the university suspended the chapter for hazing for six years.)
Kappa Upsilon	April 25, 1981	Oakland University	Rochester, Michigan	Active	
Kappa Phi	May 30, 1981	Roosevelt University	Chicago, Illinois	Active	(Note: Chapter was formed at the University of Illinois Chicago, but is no longer active at that campus. It previously operated as a citywide chapter for campuses in Chicago.)
Kappa Chi	September 12, 1981	American University	Washington, D.C.	Active	(Note: Chapter was chartered at American University but operates as a citywide chapter.)
Kappa Chi	September 12, 1981	Catholic University of America	Washington, D.C.	Active	(Note: Chapter was chartered at American University but operates as a citywide chapter.)
Kappa Chi	September 12, 1981	Georgetown University	Washington, D.C.	Active	(Note: Chapter was chartered at American University but operates as a citywide chapter.)
Kappa Chi	September 12, 1981	George Washington University	Washington, D.C.	Active	(Note: Chapter was chartered at American University but operates as a citywide chapter.)
Kappa Psi	October 23, 1981	California State University, Chico	Chico, California	Active	
Kappa Omega	November 6, 1981	Shippensburg University	Shippensburg, Pennsylvania	Active	(Note: Chapter formed at Shippensburg State College, now Shippensburg University of Pennsylvania.)
Lambda Alpha	November 7, 1981 – 2021	Commonwealth University-Bloomsburg	Bloomsburg, Pennsylvania	Inactive	(Note: Chapter formed at Bloomsburg State College, which became Bloomsburg University of Pennsylvania in 1983. The chapter went inactive when the university banned all Greek letter organizations in 2021.)
Lambda Beta	January 9, 1982	University of California, Irvine	Orange County, California	Active	
Lambda Gamma	January 22, 1982	Winthrop University	Rock Hill, South Carolina	Active	(Note: Chapter formed at Winthrop College, now Winthrop University.)
Lambda Delta	February 6, 1982 – 1992; Fall 1993– February 23, 1994	Georgia Tech	Atlanta, Georgia	Active	(Note: At one time, Southern Technical Institute, later called Southern Polytechnic State University, was associated with this chapter. The chapter was suspended for hazing in 1992 and 1994.)
Lambda Epsilon	February 26, 1982	Morris College	Sumter, South Carolina	Active	
Lambda Zeta	February 27, 1982	Towson University	Towson, Maryland	Active	(Note: Chapter formed at Towson State University, now Towson University.)
Lambda Eta	March 6, 1982	Indiana University Indianapolis	Indianapolis, Indiana	Active	(Note: This citywide chapter was formed at Indiana University–Purdue University Indianapolis (IUPUI). In 2024, IUPUI was split into two separate campuses: Indiana University Indianapolis and Purdue University in Indianapolis. The fraternity returned to Butler University in 2019.)
Lambda Eta	March 6, 1982	Butler University	Indianapolis, Indiana	Active	(Note: This citywide chapter was formed at Indiana University–Purdue University Indianapolis (IUPUI). In 2024, IUPUI was split into two separate campuses: Indiana University Indianapolis and Purdue University in Indianapolis. The fraternity returned to Butler University in 2019.)
Lambda Eta	March 6, 1982	Marian University	Indianapolis, Indiana	Active	(Note: This citywide chapter was formed at Indiana University–Purdue University Indianapolis (IUPUI). In 2024, IUPUI was split into two separate campuses: Indiana University Indianapolis and Purdue University in Indianapolis. The fraternity returned to Butler University in 2019.)
Lambda Eta	March 6, 1982	University of Indianapolis	Indianapolis, Indiana	Active	(Note: This citywide chapter was formed at Indiana University–Purdue University Indianapolis (IUPUI). In 2024, IUPUI was split into two separate campuses: Indiana University Indianapolis and Purdue University in Indianapolis. The fraternity returned to Butler University in 2019.)
Lambda Theta	May 1, 1982	Texas State University	San Marcos, Texas	Active	(Note: Chapter formed at Southwest Texas State University, now Texas State University.)
Lambda Iota	August 29, 1982	University of Tennessee at Chattanooga	Chattanooga, Tennessee	Active	
Lambda Kappa	September 11, 1982	Southern Arkansas University	Magnolia, Arkansas	Active	
Lambda Lambda	December 11, 1982	Paul Quinn College	Dallas, Texas	Active	(Note: In 1990, the college moved from Waco, Texas, to its current campus in Dallas.)
Lambda Mu	February 12, 1983	Frostburg State University	Frostburg, Maryland	Active	(Note: Chapter formed at Frostburg State College, now Frostburg State University.)
Lambda Nu	February 26, 1983	Stanford University	Stanford, California	Active	
Lambda Xi	March 12, 1983	Brown University	Providence, Rhode Island	Active	(Note: The chapter was chartered at Brown University.)
Lambda Xi	March 12, 1983	Johnson & Wales University	Providence, Rhode Island	Active	(Note: The chapter was chartered at Brown University.)
Lambda Xi	March 12, 1983	Rhode Island College	Providence, Rhode Island	Active	(Note: The chapter was chartered at Brown University.)
Lambda Xi	March 12, 1983	Bryant University	Smithfield, Rhode Island	Active	(Note: The chapter was chartered at Brown University.)
Lambda Xi	March 12, 1983	University of Rhode Island	Kingston, Rhode Island	Active	(Note: The chapter was chartered at Brown University.)
Lambda Omicron	March 26, 1983	University of New Orleans	New Orleans, Louisiana	Active	
Lambda Pi	April 16, 1983 – December 2021; 202x ?	University of Mississippi	Oxford, Mississippi	Active	(Note: In 2021, the university suspended the chapter for hazing until January 1, 2025.)
Lambda Rho	June 4, 1983	Occidental College	Los Angeles, California	Active	
Lambda Sigma	September 16, 1983	Nicholls State University	Thibodaux, Louisiana	Active	
Lambda Tau	September 17, 1983	Millersville University	Millersville, Pennsylvania	Active	(Note: Chapter formed at Millersville State College, now Millersville University of Pennsylvania.)
Lambda Upsilon	October 1, 1983	Indiana University of Pennsylvania	Indiana, Pennsylvania	Active	
Lambda Phi	November 11, 1983	Valdosta State University	Valdosta, Georgia	Active	(Note: Chapter formed at Valdosta State College, now Valdosta State University.)
Lambda Chi	May 5, 1984	Florida Institute of Technology	Melbourne, Florida	Inactive	
Lambda Psi	May 5, 1984	Georgia Southwestern State University	Americus, Georgia	Active	(Note: Chapter formed at Georgia Southwestern College, now Georgia Southwestern University.)
Lambda Omega	September 22, 1984	University of Central Florida	Orlando, Florida	Active	
Mu Alpha	November 17, 1984	Emporia State University	Emporia, Kansas	Active	
Mu Beta	November 17, 1984	East Stroudsburg University	East Stroudsburg, Pennsylvania	Active	
Mu Gamma	December 1, 1984 – 2018	DeVry University Alpharetta Campus	Alpharetta, Georgia	Inactive	(Note: Chapter went inactive when DeVry University closed its Alpharetta campus.)
Mu Delta	December 15, 1984	SUNY Brockport	Brockport, New York	Active	
Mu Epsilon	February 9, 1985	Missouri State University	Springfield, Missouri	Active	(Note: Chapter formed at Southwest Missouri State University, now Missouri State University,)
Mu Zeta(see Rho Psi)	February 16, 1985 – February 17, 1994	Southeast Missouri State University	Cape Girardeau, Missouri	Inactive	(Note: The university banned the chapter in 1994 after hazing resulted in the death of a pledge.)
Mu Eta	March 23, 1985	Northwest Missouri State University	Maryville, Missouri	Active	
Mu Theta	September 7, 1985	Francis Marion University	Florence, South Carolina	Active	(Note: Chapter formed at Francis Marion College, now Francis Marion University.)
Mu Iota	December 14, 1985	University of North Carolina at Greensboro	Greensboro, North Carolina	Active	
Mu Kappa	October 26, 1985	Binghamton University	Vestal, New York	Active	(Note: Chapter formed at the State University of New York at Binghamton, now called Binghamton University.)
Mu Lambda	October 26, 1985 – xxxx ?	Weber State University	Ogden, Utah	Inactive	
Mu Mu	October 27, 1985	George Mason University	Fairfax, Virginia	Active	(Note: Chapter formed as a colony of the Kappa Chi chapter. It originally included American University, The Catholic University of America, Georgetown University, and George Washington University.)
Mu Nu	December 14, 1985	University of North Carolina Wilmington	Wilmington, North Carolina	Active	
Mu Xi	February 18, 1986	Wittenberg University	Springfield, Ohio	Active	
Mu Omicron	February 22, 1986	State University of New York at Old Westbury	Old Westbury, New York	Active	(Note: The chapter was formed at the State University of New York College at Old Westbury, now called the State University of New York at Old Westbury.)
Mu Pi	March 16, 1986	St. John's University	Jamaica, New York	Inactive	(Note: Chapter formed as a colony of the Delta Mu chapter.)
Mu Rho	May 17, 1986 – March 2022	University of Tennessee	Knoxville, Tennessee	Inactive	(Note: In 2022, the university suspended the chapter for hazing until the spring of 2027.)
Mu Sigma	November 16, 1986	Stephen F. Austin State University	Nacogdoches, Texas	Active	
Mu Tau	November 22, 1986 – 1991; 2014	Mars Hill University	Mars Hill, North Carolina	Active	(Note: Chapter formed at Mars Hill College, now Mars Hill University.)
Mu Upsilon	November 22, 1986	Appalachian State University	Boone, North Carolina	Active	
Mu Phi	December 6, 1986	PennWest Clarion	Clarion, Pennsylvania	Active	(Note: Chapter formed at Clarion University of Pennsylvania, which merged in 2021 with Edinboro University of Pennsylvania and California University of Pennsylvania to form Pennsylvania Western University, now called PennWest.)
Mu Chi	February 14, 1987 – 2003	Dartmouth College	Hanover, New Hampshire	Inactive	
Mu Psi	March 7, 1987	Georgia College & State University	Milledgeville, Georgia	Active	(Note: Chapter formed at Georgia College, now Georgia College & State University.)
Mu Omega	March 21, 1987	Sonoma State University	Cotati, California	Active	
Nu Alpha	April 17, 1987	Texas A&M University	College Station, Texas	Active	
Nu Beta	April 17, 1987	Southern Methodist University	Dallas, Texas	Active	
Nu Gamma (see Rho Gamma)	March 26, 1987 – 2015; 2019	Yale University	New Haven, Connecticut	Active	(Note: Absorbed the institutions previously represented by Nu Gamma chapter.)
Nu Gamma (see Rho Gamma)	March 26, 1987 – 2015; 2019	Southern Connecticut State University	New Haven, Connecticut	Active	(Note: Absorbed the institutions previously represented by Nu Gamma chapter.)
Nu Gamma (see Rho Gamma)	March 26, 1987 – 2015; 2019	University of New Haven	West Haven, Connecticut	Active	(Note: Absorbed the institutions previously represented by Nu Gamma chapter.)
Nu Gamma (see Rho Gamma)	March 26, 1987 – 2015; 2019	Fairfield University	Fairfield, Connecticut	Active	(Note: Absorbed the institutions previously represented by Nu Gamma chapter.)
Nu Gamma (see Rho Gamma)	March 26, 1987 – 2015; 2019	Quinnipiac University	Hamden, Connecticut	Active	(Note: Absorbed the institutions previously represented by Nu Gamma chapter.)
Nu Gamma (see Rho Gamma)	March 26, 1987 – 2015; 2019	University of Bridgeport	Bridgeport, Connecticut	Active	(Note: Absorbed the institutions previously represented by Nu Gamma chapter.)
Nu Gamma (see Rho Gamma)	March 26, 1987 – 2015; 2019	Western Connecticut State University	Danbury, Connecticut	Active	(Note: Absorbed the institutions previously represented by Nu Gamma chapter.)
Nu Gamma (see Rho Gamma)	March 26, 1987 – 2015; 2019	Sacred Heart University	Fairfield, Connecticut	Active	(Note: Absorbed the institutions previously represented by Nu Gamma chapter.)
Nu Delta	September 25, 1987	Emory University	Atlanta, Georgia	Active	
Nu Epsilon	October 10, 1987	University of Missouri–Kansas City	Kansas City, Missouri	Active	
Nu Zeta	November 21, 1987	PennWest Edinboro	Edinboro, Pennsylvania	Active	(Note: Chapter formed at Edinboro University of Pennsylvania, which merged in 2021 with Clarion University of Pennsylvania and California University of Pennsylvania to form Pennsylvania Western University, now PennWest.)
Nu Eta	January 16, 1988	Delta State University	Cleveland, Mississippi	Active	
Nu Theta	February 5, 1988	Elon University	Elon, North Carolina	Active	(Note: Chapter formed at Elon College, now Elon University)
Nu Iota	February 12, 1988 – March 13, 2001; 20xx ?	Louisiana State University	Baton Rouge, Louisiana	Active	(Note: In 2001, the university suspended the chapter until June 2006 for hazing.)
Nu Kappa	April 10, 1988	University of Northern Iowa	Cedar Falls, Iowa	Active	
Nu Lambda	October 15, 1988	James Madison University	Harrisonburg, Virginia	Active	
Nu Mu	October 16, 1988	University of Alabama in Huntsville	Huntsville, Alabama	Active	(Note: Chapter was a colony of the Gamma Phi chapter from 1981 to 1988.)
Nu Nu	October 16, 1988	University of South Carolina Aiken	Aiken, South Carolina	Active	
Nu Xi	January 14, 1989	University of Delaware	Newark, Delaware	Active	(Note: Chapter formed as a colony of the Beta Sigma chapter from 1975 to 1988.)
Nu Omicron	February 4, 1989	University of North Carolina at Pembroke	Pembroke, North Carolina	Active	(Note: Chapter formed at Pembroke State University, now the University of North Carolina at Pembroke.)
Nu Pi	February 11, 1989 – 2009	Rensselaer Polytechnic Institute	Troy, New York	Inactive	
Nu Rho	February 25, 1989	Vanderbilt University	Nashville, Tennessee	Active	
Nu Sigma	March 4, 1989	California State University, East Bay	Hayward, California	Active	(Note: Chapter formed at California State University, Hayward, now California State University, East Bay.)
Nu Tau	March 10, 1989	University of Massachusetts Amherst	Amherst, Massachusetts	Active	
Nu Tau	March 10, 1989	American International College	Springfield, Massachusetts	Active	
Nu Upsilon	March 18, 1989	University of Michigan–Dearborn	Dearborn, Michigan	Active	
Nu Phi	November 18, 1989	Commonwealth University-Lock Haven	Lock Haven, Pennsylvania	Inactive	(Note: Chapter formed at Lock Haven University, which merged with Bloomsburg University and Mansfield University to form the Commonwealth University of Pennsylvania in 2022.)
Nu Chi	March 31, 1989	Wofford College	Spartanburg, South Carolina	Active	(Note: Chapter originally included the University of South Carolina Upstate and Limestone University. USC Upstate chartered its own chapter, while Limestone University ceased operations in 2025.)
Nu Psi	June 16, 1990	University of Connecticut	Storrs, Connecticut	Inactive	
Nu Psi	June 16, 1990	Wesleyan University	Middletown, Connecticut	Inactive	
Nu Omega	November 14, 1990	Southeastern Louisiana University	Hammond, Louisiana	Active	
Xi Alpha	November 18, 1990	Centenary College of Louisiana	Shreveport, Louisiana	Active	
Xi Beta	December 1, 1990	Embry–Riddle Aeronautical University, Daytona Beach	Daytona Beach, Florida	Active	
Xi Gamma	April 12, 1991	Rowan University	Glassboro, New Jersey	Active	(Note: Chapter formed at Glassboro State College, now known as Rowan University. Now a multi-campus chapter, it previously included Rutgers University-Camden.)
Xi Gamma	April 12, 1991	Stockton University	Galloway Township, New Jersey	Active	(Note: Chapter formed at Glassboro State College, now known as Rowan University. Now a multi-campus chapter, it previously included Rutgers University-Camden.)
Xi Delta (First) (see Eta Delta)	April 12, 1991 – xxxx ?	Princeton University	Princeton, New Jersey	Consolidated, Reassigned	(Note: Princeton is now part of the Eta Delta chapter)
Xi Epsilon	December 7, 1991	University of Rochester	Rochester, New York	Active	
Xi Zeta	December 15, 1991	New York Institute of Technology	New York City, New York	Inactive	
Xi Eta	January 5, 1992	Commonwealth University-Mansfield	Mansfield, Pennsylvania	Inactive	(Note: Chapter formed at Mansfield University, which merged with Bloomsburg University and Lock Haven University in 2022 to form the Commonwealth University of Pennsylvania.)
Xi Theta	January 11, 1992	College of William & Mary	Williamsburg, Virginia	Active	
Xi Iota	January 12, 1992	Saginaw Valley State University	University Center, Michigan	Active	(Note: The chapter was chartered at Saginaw Valley State University.)
Xi Iota	January 12, 1992	Northwood University	Midland, Michigan	Active	(Note: The chapter was chartered at Saginaw Valley State University.)
Xi Kappa	September 22, 1992	Bucknell University	Lewisburg, Pennsylvania	Active	
Xi Lambda	March 21, 1992	University of North Florida	Jacksonville, Florida	Active	
Xi Mu	May 9, 1992 – 2021	Wesley College	Dover, Delaware	Inactive	(Note: Chapter went inactive when the school was acquired by Delaware State University and ceased operations in 2021.)
Xi Nu	November 11, 1992	Tennessee Technological University	Cookeville, Tennessee	Active	
Xi Xi	January 23, 1993	University of Akron	Akron, Ohio	Active	
Xi Omicron	January 24, 1993	LIU Post	Brookville, New York	Inactive	(Note: Chapter formed at C.W. Post Campus of Long Island University, now called LIU Post.)
Xi Pi	February 27, 1993	Newberry College	Newberry, South Carolina	Active	
Xi Rho	November 7, 1993 – xxxx ?; 2012	DePauw University	Greencastle, Indiana	Active	(Note: DePauw University was part of the Alpha chapter of Indiana University before gaining its own charter.)
Xi Rho	November 7, 1993 – xxxx ?; 2012	Wabash College	Crawfordsville, Indiana	Active	(Note: DePauw University was part of the Alpha chapter of Indiana University before gaining its own charter.)
Xi Sigma	May 14, 1994	Baylor University	Waco, Texas	Active	
Xi Tau	February 15, 1995	Wright State University	Dayton, Ohio	Active	
Xi Upsilon	September 16, 1995	University of Montevallo	Montevallo, Alabama	Active	
Xi Phi	February 3, 1996	University of Nevada, Reno	Reno, Nevada	Active	
Xi Chi				Never chartered	
Xi Psi	April 18, 1996	University of the Virgin Islands	Saint Thomas, U.S. Virgin Islands	Inactive	
Xi Omega	April 26, 1998	Furman University	Greenville, South Carolina	Active	(Note: From 1994 to 1998, Furman University was under the Gamma Nu chapter of Claflin College. During the 1970s, several students at Furman joined the Zeta Epsilon chapter of the University of South Carolina.)
Omicron Alpha	May 1, 1998	Samford University	Homewood, Alabama	Active	
Omicron Beta	February 28, 1999	Georgia Southern University–Armstrong Campus	Savannah, Georgia	Active	(Note: Chapter formed at Armstrong State University, which merged with Georgia Southern University in 2018, becoming Georgia Southern University–Armstrong Campus.)
Omicron Gamma	March 11, 1999	Florida Atlantic University	Boca Raton, Florida	Active	
Omicron Delta	March 27, 1999	Jacksonville University	Jacksonville, Florida	Active	
Omicron Epsilon	May 1, 1999	Christian Brothers University	Memphis, Tennessee	Active	
Omicron Zeta	May 15, 1999	Colorado State University	Fort Collins, Colorado	Active	(Note: This is a citywide chapter that includes all Denver Metropolitan area colleges.)
Omicron Eta	November 19, 1999 – 20xx ?	Florida Southern College	Lakeland, Florida	Inactive	
Omicron Theta	February 13, 2000	Michigan Technological University	Houghton, Michigan	Active	
Omicron Iota	September 23, 2001	Kennesaw State University	Kennesaw, Georgia	Active	
Omicron Kappa	October 7, 2001	Lehigh University	Bethlehem, Pennsylvania	Active	(Note: Chapter was a colony of the Kappa Gamma chapter from 1987 until 2001.)
Omicron Lambda	October 13, 2001	Auburn University at Montgomery	Montgomery, Alabama	Active	
Omicron Mu	December 16, 2001	Charleston Southern University	Charleston, South Carolina	Active	
Omicron Nu	January 19, 2001	Lander University	Greenwood, South Carolina	Active	
Omicron Xi	March 30, 2002	University of Houston–Downtown	Houston, Texas	Active	
Omicron Omicron	April 26, 2002	Millsaps College	Jackson, Mississippi	Active	
Omicron Pi	December 5, 2002	University of Colorado Colorado Springs	Colorado Springs, Colorado	Active	(Note: The University of Colorado at Colorado Springs holds the charter for this multi-institutional campus. The chapter expanded to include the U.S. Air Force Academy in 2019 and Colorado State University Pueblo in 2022.)
Omicron Pi	December 5, 2002	Colorado College	Colorado Springs, Colorado	Active	(Note: The University of Colorado at Colorado Springs holds the charter for this multi-institutional campus. The chapter expanded to include the U.S. Air Force Academy in 2019 and Colorado State University Pueblo in 2022.)
Omicron Pi	December 5, 2002	United States Air Force Academy	El Paso County, Colorado	Active	(Note: The University of Colorado at Colorado Springs holds the charter for this multi-institutional campus. The chapter expanded to include the U.S. Air Force Academy in 2019 and Colorado State University Pueblo in 2022.)
Omicron Pi	December 5, 2002	Colorado State University Pueblo	Pueblo, Colorado	Active	(Note: The University of Colorado at Colorado Springs holds the charter for this multi-institutional campus. The chapter expanded to include the U.S. Air Force Academy in 2019 and Colorado State University Pueblo in 2022.)
Omicron Rho	April 4, 2003	Midwestern State University	Wichita Falls, Texas	Active	
Omicron Sigma	April 18, 2004	Wake Forest University	Winston-Salem, North Carolina	Active	
Omicron Tau	April 24, 2004	University of Texas at San Antonio	San Antonio, Texas	Active	
Omicron Upsilon	April 2, 2005	Loyola University New Orleans	New Orleans, Louisiana	Active	
Omicron Phi (see Iota Pi)	July 13, 2005 – December 31, 2019	Georgia Southern University	Statesboro, Georgia	Inactive	(Note: Re-established the Iota Pi chapter. In 2019, the chapter was suspended for hazing until August 1, 2025.) (Note: No longer listed on the national fraternity's website or the university's website as of April 2026.)
Omicron Chi	June 25, 2005 – 20xx ?	Florida International University	Miami, Florida	Inactive	
Omicron Psi	July 9, 2005	Florida Gulf Coast University	Fort Myers, Florida	Active	
Omicron Omega	August 12, 2005 – 20xx ?	Clayton State University	Morrow, Georgia	Inactive	
Pi Alpha	October 27, 2005 – 20xx ?	University of California, Santa Barbara	Santa Barbara, California	Inactive	
Pi Beta	March 25, 2006	California State University, Fresno	Fresno, California	Active	
Pi Gamma	April 19, 2006	Coastal Carolina University	Conway, South Carolina	Active	
Pi Delta (see Theta Rho)	May 19, 2006	Louisiana Tech University	Ruston, Louisiana	Active	(Note: Re-established the Theta Rho chapter.)
Pi Epsilon	May 19, 2006	Tulane University	New Orleans, Louisiana	Active	
Pi Zeta	June 8, 2006	Grand Valley State University	Allendale, Michigan	Active	
Pi Eta (see Beta Sigma)	March 25, 2007	Delaware State University	Dover, Delaware	Active	(Note: Re-established the Beta Sigma chapter. Formerly, a part of the Xi Mu chapter.)
Pi Theta	April 15, 2007	High Point University	High Point, North Carolina	Active	
Pi Iota	June 14, 2007 – 2015	Southern Polytechnic State University	Marietta, Georgia	Inactive	(Note: This was originally a subchapter of the Lambda Delta chapter. When Southern Polytechnic State University closed and merged with Kennesaw State University, the chapter went inactive, with all new initiates joining Omicron Iota.)
Pi Kappa	October 17, 2008	Barry University	Miami, Florida	Inactive	
Pi Lambda	September 20, 2008	Arkansas Baptist College	Little Rock, Arkansas	Active	
Pi Mu	September 28, 2008	Davidson College	Davidson, North Carolina	Active	
Pi Nu (see Gamma Xi)	December 13, 2008	University of Maryland Eastern Shore	Princess Anne, Maryland	Active	(Note: Re-established the inactive Gamma Xi chapter.)
Pi Xi	April 16, 2009	Augusta State University	Augusta, Georgia	Active	
Pi Omicron	April 16, 2009	University of South Carolina Upstate	Spartanburg, South Carolina	Active	
Pi Pi	April 23, 2009	Northern Kentucky University	Highland Heights, Kentucky	Active	
Pi Rho	July 23, 2009	Stony Brook University	Stony Brook, New York	Active	
Pi Sigma	July 24, 2009	Rutgers University–Newark	Newark, New Jersey	Inactive	
Pi Tau	July 24, 2009	Seton Hall University	South Orange, New Jersey	Active	
Pi Upsilon	June 12, 2010 – 2012	Arkansas Tech University	Russellville, Arkansas	Inactive	(Note: In 2012, the university permanently removed the chapter for hazing.)
Pi Phi	August 20, 2010	Nova Southeastern University	Fort Lauderdale, Florida	Active	
Pi Chi	August 21, 2010	Huntingdon College	Montgomery, Alabama	Active	
Pi Psi	August 25, 2010 – May 8, 2025	Penn State Harrisburg	Harrisburg, Pennsylvania	Inactive	(Note: In 2025, the university suspended the chapter until 2027 for hazing.)
Pi Omega	September 18, 2010	University of Wisconsin–Whitewater	Whitewater, Wisconsin	Active	
Rho Alpha	April 17, 2011	New Jersey City University	Jersey City, New Jersey	Active	
Rho Beta	June 3, 2011 – 20xx ?	California State University, Monterey Bay	Seaside, California	Inactive	
Rho Gamma (see Nu Gamma)	March 15, 2012 – 20xx ?	University of Bridgeport	Bridgeport, Connecticut	Consolidated	(Note: The University of Bridgeport held the charter for this metro chapter. The chapter consolidated with the Nu Gamma chapter.)
Rho Gamma (see Nu Gamma)	March 15, 2012 – 20xx ?	University of New Haven	West Haven, Connecticut	Consolidated	(Note: The University of Bridgeport held the charter for this metro chapter. The chapter consolidated with the Nu Gamma chapter.)
Rho Gamma (see Nu Gamma)	March 15, 2012 – 20xx ?	Southern Connecticut State University	New Haven, Connecticut	Consolidated	(Note: The University of Bridgeport held the charter for this metro chapter. The chapter consolidated with the Nu Gamma chapter.)
Rho Gamma (see Nu Gamma)	March 15, 2012 – 20xx ?	Quinnipiac University	Hamden, Connecticut	Consolidated	(Note: The University of Bridgeport held the charter for this metro chapter. The chapter consolidated with the Nu Gamma chapter.)
Rho Delta	December 4, 2012	Chowan University	Murfreesboro, North Carolina	Active	
Rho Epsilon	March 16, 2013	Kutztown University	Kutztown, Pennsylvania	Active	
Rho Zeta	June 5, 2013	Methodist University	Fayetteville, North Carolina	Active	
Rho Eta (see Alpha Mu)	August 22, 2013 – 2023	Lincoln University	Jefferson City, Missouri	Inactive	(Note: This was the re-establishment of the Alpha Mu chapter. After this chapter went inactive, the Alpha Mu chapter was reactivated in 2023.)
Rho Theta	October 4, 2014	Radford University	Radford, VA	Active	
Rho Iota	April 30, 2016	University of New Mexico	Albuquerque, New Mexico	Active	
Rho Kappa	July 23, 2016	Longwood University	Farmville, Virginia	Active	(Note: Chapter formed as a colony of the Nu Lambda chapter. It was originally chartered at Virginia University of Lynchburg. Longwood University currently holds the chapter's charter. In 2017, the chapter established a colony at Hampden–Sydney College. At one point, the chapter also included colonies at Eastern Mennonite University.)
Rho Kappa	July 23, 2016	Virginia University of Lynchburg	Lynchburg, Virginia	Active	(Note: Chapter formed as a colony of the Nu Lambda chapter. It was originally chartered at Virginia University of Lynchburg. Longwood University currently holds the chapter's charter. In 2017, the chapter established a colony at Hampden–Sydney College. At one point, the chapter also included colonies at Eastern Mennonite University.)
Rho Kappa	July 23, 2016	Liberty University	Lynchburg, Virginia	Active	(Note: Chapter formed as a colony of the Nu Lambda chapter. It was originally chartered at Virginia University of Lynchburg. Longwood University currently holds the chapter's charter. In 2017, the chapter established a colony at Hampden–Sydney College. At one point, the chapter also included colonies at Eastern Mennonite University.)
Rho Kappa	July 23, 2016	Averett University	Danville, Virginia	Active	(Note: Chapter formed as a colony of the Nu Lambda chapter. It was originally chartered at Virginia University of Lynchburg. Longwood University currently holds the chapter's charter. In 2017, the chapter established a colony at Hampden–Sydney College. At one point, the chapter also included colonies at Eastern Mennonite University.)
Rho Kappa	July 23, 2016	Hampden–Sydney College	Hampden Sydney, Virginia	Active	(Note: Chapter formed as a colony of the Nu Lambda chapter. It was originally chartered at Virginia University of Lynchburg. Longwood University currently holds the chapter's charter. In 2017, the chapter established a colony at Hampden–Sydney College. At one point, the chapter also included colonies at Eastern Mennonite University.)
Rho Lambda	August 11, 2018 – 20xx ?	University of West Florida	Pensacola, Florida	Inactive	(Note: Chapter formed as a colony of the Eta Nu chapter.)
Rho Mu	August 18, 2018	University of the Bahamas	Nassau, Bahamas	Active	(Note: This was the first international undergraduate chapter. Chapter formed as a colony of the Epsilon Mu chapter.)
Rho Nu	August 30, 2018 – 2025; April 2026	Rutgers University–Camden	Camden, New Jersey	Active	(Note: Chapter formed as a colony of the Xi Gamma chapter.)
Rho Xi	September 17, 2018 – 2021	Rider University	Lawrenceville, New Jersey	Inactive	(Note: Rider University was originally part of the Eta Delta chapter. In 2021, the university withdrew its recognition of the chapter until September 4, 2024, for social code violations, including hazing.)
Rho Omicron	December 1, 2018	Xavier University	Cincinnati, Ohio	Active	(Note: Chapter formed as a colony of the Beta Eta chapter.)
Rho Pi (see Kappa Nu)	January 19, 2019	Sam Houston State University	Huntsville, Texas	Active	(Note: Re-established the Kappa Nu chapter.)
Rho Rho	January 20, 2019	Cumberland University	Lebanon, Tennessee	Active	(Note: Chapter formed as a colony of the Xi Nu chapter.)
Rho Sigma	June 21, 2019	Georgetown College	Georgetown, Kentucky	Active	(Note: Chapter formed as a colony of the Alpha Upsilon chapter.)
Rho Tau	September 22, 2019	Valparaiso University	Valparaiso, Indiana	Active	
Rho Upsilon	October 20, 2019	Johns Hopkins University	Baltimore, Maryland	Active	(Note: Was the Zeta Gamma colony from 1970 to 2015, and the Lambda Zeta colony from 2016 to 2019.)
Rho Phi	April 10, 2023	Widener University	Chester, Pennsylvania	Active	(Note: Chapter formed as a colony of the Kappa Gamma chapter.)
Rho Chi	April 15, 2023	Central Connecticut State University	New Britain, Connecticut	Active	
Xi Delta (Second)	2024	William Paterson University	Wayne, New Jersey	Active	
Rho Psi (see Mu Zeta)	September 10, 2025	Southeast Missouri State University	Cape Girardeau, Missouri	Active	(Note: Re-established the inactive Mu Zeta chapter.)
Rho Omega	September 15, 2026	Georgia Gwinnett College	Lawrenceville, Georgia	Active	(Note: Chapter formed as a colony of the Lambda Delta chapter.)
Sigma Alpha	May 15, 2026	Kenyon College	Gambier, Ohio	Active	(Note: This is a citywide chapter that is based at Kenyon College. The chapter includes Denison University, Ohio Wesleyan, and Otterbein University.)
Sigma Alpha	May 15, 2026	Denison University	Granville, Ohio	Active	(Note: This is a citywide chapter that is based at Kenyon College. The chapter includes Denison University, Ohio Wesleyan, and Otterbein University.)
Sigma Alpha	May 15, 2026	Ohio Wesleyan	Delaware, Ohio	Active	(Note: This is a citywide chapter that is based at Kenyon College. The chapter includes Denison University, Ohio Wesleyan, and Otterbein University.)
Sigma Alpha	May 15, 2026	Otterbein University	Westerville, Ohio	Active	(Note: This is a citywide chapter that is based at Kenyon College. The chapter includes Denison University, Ohio Wesleyan, and Otterbein University.)

== Alumni chapters ==
In the following list of Kappa Alpha Psi alumni chapters, active chapters are indicated bold and inactive chapters are in italics.

Chapter	Charter date and range	Location	Status	Reference
Chicago (IL) Alumni Chapter	April 15, 1919	Chicago, Illinois	Active	
Detroit (MI) Alumni Chapter	April 3, 1920	Detroit, Michigan	Active	
Indianapolis (IN) Alumni Chapter	October 15, 1920	Indianapolis, Indiana	Active	(Note: Originally chartered as the Gamma chapter in 1913.)
Cleveland (OH) Alumni Chapter	October 15, 1920	Cleveland, Ohio	Active	
Louisville (KY) Alumni Chapter	October 20, 1920	Louisville, Kentucky	Active	
St. Louis (MO) Alumni Chapter	April 19, 1921	St. Louis, Missouri	Active	
Columbus (OH) Alumni Chapter	April 23, 1921	Columbus, Ohio	Active	
Baltimore (MD) Alumni Chapter	September 9, 1921	Baltimore, Maryland	Active	
Durham (NC) Alumni Chapter	September 12, 1921	Durham, North Carolina	Active	
Oklahoma City (OK) Alumni Chapter	April 25, 1922	Oklahoma City, Oklahoma	Active	(Note: Originally chartered as Langston Alumni Chapter)
Philadelphia (PA) Alumni Chapter	May 25, 1922	Philadelphia, Pennsylvania	Active	
Pittsburgh (PA) Alumni Chapter	June 23, 1922	Pittsburgh, Pennsylvania	Active	
Kansas City (MO) Alumni Chapter	March 31, 1923	Kansas City, Missouri	Active	
Cincinnati (OH) Alumni Chapter	December 18, 1923	Cincinnati, Ohio	Active	
Atlanta (GA) Alumni Chapter	February 22, 1924	Atlanta, Georgia	Active	
Washington (DC) Alumni Chapter	October 15, 1924	Washington, D.C.	Active	
Jacksonville (FL) Alumni Chapter	February 27, 1925	Jacksonville, Florida	Active	(Note: First Black Greek letter organization in the state of Florida.)
Topeka (KS) Alumni Chapter	April 14, 1925	Topeka, Kansas	Active	
Wichita (KS) Alumni Chapter	April 14, 1925	Wichita, Kansas	Active	
Nashville (TN) Alumni Chapter	April 24, 1926	Nashville, Tennessee	Active	
Lexington (KY) Alumni Chapter	December 17, 1927	Lexington, Kentucky	Active	
Marshall (TX) Alumni Chapter	March 30, 1928	Marshall, Texas	Active	
Houston (TX) Alumni Chapter	March 31, 1928	Houston, Texas	Active	
Tampa (FL) Alumni Chapter	June 11, 1928	Tampa, Florida	Active	
Wilberforce (OH) Alumni Chapter	December 8, 1928	Wilberforce, Ohio	Active	
Tuskegee (AL) Alumni Chapter	May 19, 1929	Tuskegee, Alabama	Active	
San Antonio (TX) Alumni Chapter	May 22, 1931	San Antonio, Texas	Active	
Tulsa (OK) Alumni Chapter	May 23, 1931	Tulsa, Oklahoma	Active	
Bluefield (WV) Alumni Chapter	August 26, 1932	Bluefield, West Virginia	Inactive	
Memphis (TN) Alumni Chapter	September 24, 1934	Memphis, Tennessee	Active	
Youngstown (OH) Alumni Chapter	November 2, 1934	Youngstown, Ohio	Active	
Dallas (TX) Alumni Chapter	March 9, 1935	Dallas, Texas	Active	
New Orleans (LA) Alumni Chapter	May 12, 1936	New Orleans, Louisiana	Active	
New York (NY) Alumni Chapter	February 20, 1937	New York City, New York	Active	
Little Rock (AR) Alumni Chapter	August 8, 1938	Little Rock, Arkansas	Active	
Los Angeles (CA) Alumni Chapter	August 8, 1938	Los Angeles, California	Active	
Springfield (IL) Alumni Chapter	September 14, 1938	Springfield, Illinois	Active	
Charleston (WV) Alumni Chapter	March 3, 1939	Charleston, West Virginia	Active	
Jefferson City (MO) Alumni Chapter	May 18, 1940	Jefferson City, Missouri	Active	
Norfolk (VA) Alumni Chapter	September 1, 1940	Norfolk, Virginia	Active	
Jackson (MS) Alumni Chapter	February 21, 1941	Jackson, Mississippi	Active	
Pittsburg (KS) Alumni Chapter	March 23, 1941	Pittsburg, Kansas	Active	
Petersburg (VA) Alumni Chapter	April 18, 1941	Petersburg, Virginia	Active	
Savannah (GA) Alumni Chapter	April 18, 1941	Savannah, Georgia	Active	
Baton Rouge (LA) Alumni Chapter	March 15, 1942	Baton Rouge, Louisiana	Active	
Birmingham (AL) Alumni Chapter	November 7, 1943	Birmingham, Alabama	Active	
Charlotte (NC) Alumni Chapter	June 10, 1944	Charlotte, North Carolina	Active	
Buffalo (NY) Alumni Chapter	February 10, 1945	Buffalo, New York	Active	
Charleston (SC) Alumni Chapter	March 29, 1945	Charleston, South Carolina	Active	
Richmond (VA) Alumni Chapter	April 7, 1945	Richmond, Virginia	Active	
Gary (IN) Alumni Chapter	July 30, 1945	Gary, Indiana	Active	
Hampton-Newport News (VA) Alumni Chapter	August 4, 1945	Hampton, Virginia	Active	
Northfolk (WV) Alumni Chapter	September 1, 1945	Northfork, West Virginia	Inactive	
Muskogee (OK) Alumni Chapter	March 15, 1946	Muskogee, Oklahoma	Active	
Chattanooga (TN) Alumni Chapter	June 1, 1946	Chattanooga, Tennessee	Active	
Greensboro (NC) Alumni Chapter	June 11, 1946	Greensboro, North Carolina	Active	
Tallahassee (FL) Alumni Chapter	June 29, 1946	Tallahassee, Florida	Active	
Knoxville (TN) Alumni Chapter	November 1, 1946	Knoxville, Tennessee	Active	
Miami (FL) Alumni Chapter	November 23, 1946	Miami, Florida	Active	
Dayton (OH) Alumni Chapter	December 17, 1946	Dayton, Ohio	Active	
Columbia (SC) Alumni Chapter	February 2, 1947	Columbia, South Carolina	Active	
Pensacola (FL) Alumni Chapter	March 8, 1947	Pensacola, Florida	Active	
Wilmington (DE) Alumni Chapter	March 8, 1947	Wilmington, Delaware	Active	
Flint (MI) Alumni Chapter	March 15, 1947	Flint, Michigan	Active	
Orlando (FL) Alumni Chapter	March 15, 1947	Orlando, Florida	Active	
Cheraw (SC) Alumni Chapter	March 21, 1947	Cheraw, South Carolina	Active	
Berkeley (CA) Alumni Chapter	May 24, 1947	Oakland, California	Active	
Phoenix (AZ) Alumni Chapter	June 18, 1947	Phoenix, Arizona	Active	
Fort Worth (TX) Alumni Chapter	November 22, 1947	Fort Worth, Texas	Active	
Columbus (GA) Alumni Chapter	December 14, 1947	Columbus, Georgia	Active	
Newark (NJ) Alumni Chapter	December 14, 1947	Newark, New Jersey	Active	
Wilmington (NC) Alumni Chapter	February 14, 1948	Wilmington, North Carolina	Active	
Raleigh (NC) Alumni Chapter	April 6, 1948	Raleigh, North Carolina	Active	
Orangeburg (SC) Alumni Chapter	April 30, 1948	Orangeburg, South Carolina	Active	
Milwaukee (WI) Alumni Chapter	September 9, 1948	Milwaukee, Wisconsin	Active	
Tyler (TX) Alumni Chapter	September 18, 1948	Tyler, Texas	Active	
Shreveport (LA) Alumni Chapter	November 20, 1948	Shreveport, Louisiana	Active	
Austin (TX) Alumni Chapter	February 12, 1949	Austin, Texas	Active	
Daytona Beach (FL) Alumni Chapter	February 18, 1949	Daytona Beach, Florida	Active	
Rocky Mount (NC) Alumni Chapter	February 18, 1949	Rocky Mount, North Carolina	Active	
Trenton (NJ) Alumni Chapter	April 6, 1949	Trenton, New Jersey	Active	
Brooklyn-Long Island (NY) Alumni Chapter	April 9, 1949	New York City, New York	Active	(Note: Originally chartered as the Brooklyn Alumni Chapter, it was changed to the Brooklyn-Long Island Alumni Chapter in 1960.)
Montgomery (AL) Alumni Chapter	April 9, 1949	Montgomery, Alabama	Active	
Jackson (TN) Alumni Chapter	December 3, 1949	Jackson, Tennessee	Active	
Macon-Warner Robins (GA) Alumni Chapter	March 6, 1950	Macon, Georgia	Active	(Note: Originally chartered as Fort Valley Alumni Chapter, it was rechartered as Macon-Warner Robins Alumni Chapter in 1992)
Albany (GA) Alumni Chapter	March 18, 1950	Albany, Georgia	Active	
Hartford (CT) Alumni Chapter	April 15, 1950	Hartford, Connecticut	Active	
Des Moines (IA) Alumni Chapter	April 29, 1950	Des Moines, Iowa	Active	
San Diego (CA) Alumni Chapter	April 30, 1950	San Diego, California	Active	
Mobile (AL) Alumni Chapter	May 27, 1950	Mobile, Alabama	Active	
Winston-Salem (NC) Alumni Chapter	May 27, 1950	Winston-Salem, North Carolina	Active	
Boston (MA) Alumni Chapter	June 3, 1950	Boston, Massachusetts	Active	
Roanoke (VA) Alumni Chapter	June 3, 1950	Roanoke, Virginia	Active	
Greenville (SC) Alumni Chapter	June 11, 1950	Greenville, South Carolina	Active	(Note: The chapter was the Greenville-Spartanburg Alumni Chapter between 1965 and 2003.)
Omaha (NE) Alumni Chapter	November 22, 1950	Omaha, Nebraska	Active	
Galveston (TX) Alumni Chapter	December 2, 1950	Galveston, Texas	Active	
Toledo (OH) Alumni Chapter	March 30, 1951	Toledo, Ohio	Active	
Gadsden (AL) Alumni Chapter	February 7, 1951	Gadsden, Alabama	Active	
Lawrenceville (VA) Alumni Chapter	March 16, 1952	Lawrenceville, Virginia	Inactive	
Hopkinsville-Fort Campbell (KY) Alumni Chapter	June 26, 1952	Hopkinsville, Kentucky	Active	
Augusta (GA) Alumni Chapter	May 2, 1952	Augusta, Georgia	Active	
Port Arthur (TX) Alumni Chapter	March 13, 1953	Port Arthur, Texas	Active	
Pine Bluff (AR) Alumni Chapter	April 19, 1953	Pine Bluff, Arkansas	Active	
Portland (OR) Alumni Chapter	September 10, 1953	Portland, Oregon	Active	
Cape Charles-Accomac (VA) Alumni Chapter	October 25, 1953	Cape Charles, Virginia	Inactive	
Waco (TX) Alumni Chapter	November 29, 1953	Waco, Texas	Active	
Seattle (WA) Alumni Chapter	February 18, 1954	Seattle, Washington	Active	
Greenville (MS) Alumni Chapter	February 14, 1954	Greenville, Mississippi	Active	
Denver (CO) Alumni Chapter	February 20, 1954	Denver, Colorado	Active	
Fort Lauderdale (FL) Alumni Chapter	February 21, 1954	Fort Lauderdale, Florida	Active	
West Palm Beach (FL) Alumni Chapter	February 21, 1954	West Palm Beach, Florida	Active	
St. Paul-Minneapolis (MN) Alumni Chapter	February 27, 1954	Minneapolis, Minnesota	Active	
Akron (OH) Alumni Chapter	March 27, 1955	Akron, Ohio	Active	
Asbury Park-Neptune (NJ) Alumni Chapter	April 8, 1955	Asbury Park, New Jersey	Active	
East St. Louis (IL) Alumni Chapter	April 17, 1955	East St. Louis, Illinois	Active	
Allendale (SC) Alumni Chapter	June 29, 1955	Allendale, South Carolina	Active	
Lake Charles (LA) Alumni Chapter	October 2, 1955	Lake Charles, Louisiana	Active	
Dover (DE) Alumni Chapter	March 10, 1956	Dover, Delaware	Active	
Grambling (LA) Alumni Chapter	May 12, 1956	Grambling, Louisiana	Active	
Martinsville (VA) Alumni Chapter	June 2, 1956	Martinsville, Virginia	Active	
Wewoka (OK) Alumni Chapter	June 13, 1956	Wewoka, Oklahoma	Inactive	
New Haven (CT) Alumni Chapter	June 15, 1956	New Haven, Connecticut	Inactive	
Williamson (WV) Alumni Chapter	November 3, 1956	Williamson, West Virginia	Inactive	
Fayetteville (NC) Alumni Chapter	February 25, 1956	Fayetteville, North Carolina	Active	(Note: Originally chartered as the Fayetteville Alumni Chapter, it became the Fayetteville-Fort Bragg-Pope AFB Alumni Chapter in the early 1980s. When Pope AFB closed, the name changed to the Fayetteville-Fort Bragg Alumni Chapter. After Fort Bragg was renamed Fort Liberty in 2021, the chapter reverted to its original name.)
Amarillo (TX) Alumni Chapter	July 16, 1957	Amarillo, Texas	Active	
Gainesville (FL) Alumni Chapter	December 20, 1957	Gainesville, Florida	Active	(Note: Originally called the Ocala Alumni Chapter.)
Florence (SC) Alumni Chapter	March 15, 1958	Florence, South Carolina	Active	
South Bend (IN) Alumni Chapter	April 12, 1958	South Bend, Indiana	Active	
Poughkeepsie (NY) Alumni Chapter	May 4, 1958	Poughkeepsie, New York	Active	
Inkster (MI) Alumni Chapter	December 6, 1958	Inkster, Michigan	Inactive	(Note: Originally chartered as Inkster Alumni Chapter. Rechartered as Ann Arbor-Ypsilanti-Inkster Alumni Chapter in 1970.)
Tuscaloosa (AL) Alumni Chapter	December 13, 1958	Tuscaloosa, Alabama	Active	
Evanston (IL) Alumni Chapter	July 27, 1959	Evanston, Illinois	Active	
San Bernardino (CA) Alumni Chapter	November 8, 1959	San Bernardino, California	Active	
Huntsville (AL) Alumni Chapter	February 21, 1960	Huntsville, Alabama	Active	
Harrisburg (PA) Alumni Chapter	May 28, 1960	Harrisburg, Pennsylvania	Active	
Hattiesburg (MS) Alumni Chapter	October 9, 1960	Hattiesburg, Mississippi	Active	
Pasadena (CA) Alumni Chapter	March 17, 1961	Pasadena, California	Active	
Alexandria (LA) Alumni Chapter	November 13, 1961	Alexandria, Louisiana	Active	
Opelousas (LA) Alumni Chapter	December 17, 1961	Opelousas, Louisiana	Active	
Athens (GA) Alumni Chapter	April 4, 1962	Athens, Georgia	Active	
Meridian (MS) Alumni Chapter	April 15, 1962	Meridian, Mississippi	Active	
El Paso-Las Cruces (TX-NM) Alumni Chapter	October 13, 1962	El Paso, Texas	Active	
St. Petersburg (FL) Alumni Chapter	December 16, 1962	St. Petersburg, Florida	Active	
Lakeland (FL) Alumni Chapter	March 10, 1963	Lakeland, Florida	Active	
Lawton-Fort Sill (OK) Alumni Chapter	March 23, 1963	Lawton, Oklahoma	Active	
Monroe (LA) Alumni Chapter	May 27, 1963	Monroe, Louisiana	Active	
Natchez (MS) Alumni Chapter	March 22, 1964	Natchez, Mississippi	Active	
Germany Alumni Chapter	June 3, 1964	Kaiserslautern, Germany	Active	(Note: The first international chapter.)
Las Vegas (NV) Alumni Chapter	September 27, 1964	Las Vegas, Nevada	Active	
Pontiac (MI) Alumni Chapter	May 17, 1965	Pontiac, Michigan	Active	
Kingstree (SC) Alumni Chapter	May 22, 1965	Kingstree, South Carolina	Active	
Rock Hill (SC) Alumni Chapter	September 17, 1965	Rock Hill, South Carolina	Active	
Chicago Heights (IL) Alumni Chapter	October 23, 1965	Chicago Heights, Illinois	Active	
Annapolis (MD) Alumni Chapter	December 5, 1965	Annapolis, Maryland	Active	
Gretna Alumni (LA) Chapter	February 27, 1966	Gretna, Louisiana	Active	
Smithfield (NC) Alumni Chapter	March 26, 1966	Smithfield, North Carolina	Active	
Galena Park Alumni (TX) Chapter	March 1, 1966	Galena Park, Texas	Inactive	
Prairie View (TX) Alumni Chapter	June 5, 1966	Prairie View, Texas	Active	
Riverside (CA) Alumni Chapter	January 15, 1967	Riverside, California	Active	
Tucson-Sierra Vista (AZ) Alumni Chapter	March 18, 1967	Tucson, Arizona	Active	
Benton Harbor (MI) Alumni Chapter	July 13, 1968	Benton Harbor, Michigan	Active	
Atmore (AL) Alumni Chapter	March 28, 1969	Atmore, Alabama	Active	
Burlington-Camden (NJ) Alumni Chapter	April 12, 1969	Haddonfield, New Jersey	Active	
Fredericksburg (VA) Alumni Chapter	June 6, 1969	Fredericksburg, Virginia	Active	
Elizabeth City (NC) Alumni Chapter	July 15, 1970	Elizabeth City, North Carolina	Active	
Conway-Myrtle Beach (SC) Alumni Chapter	August 8, 1970	Myrtle Beach, South Carolina	Active	(Note: Originally chartered as the Conway Alumni Chapter. The name changed to the Conway-Myrtle Beach Alumni chapter in 1999.)
Ann Arbor-Ypsilanti-Inkster (MI) Alumni Chapter	September 1, 1970	Ypsilanti, Michigan	Active	(Note: Originally chartered as Inkster Alumni Chapter. Rechartered as Ann Arbor-Ypsilanti-Inkster Alumni Chapter in 1970.)
Champaign-Urbana (IL) Alumni Chapter	September 12, 1970	Champaign, Illinois	Active	
Evansville (IN) Alumni Chapter	September 20, 1970	Evansville, Indiana	Active	
San Jose (CA) Alumni Chapter	September 25, 1970	San Jose, California	Active	
Wichita Falls (TX) Alumni Chapter	January 23, 1971	Wichita Falls, Texas	Active	
Aberdeen (MD) Alumni Chapter	April 4, 1971	Bel Air, Maryland	Active	
Lubbock (TX) Alumni Chapter	November 15, 1971	Lubbock, Texas	Active	
Albany (NY) Alumni Chapter	December 4, 1971	Albany, New York	Active	
Fort Wayne (IN) Alumni Chapter	February 26, 1972	Fort Wayne, Indiana	Active	
Grand Rapids (MI) Alumni Chapter	May 12, 1972	Grand Rapids, Michigan	Active	
Honolulu (HI) Alumni Chapter	May 20, 1972	Honolulu, Hawaii	Active	
Silver Spring (MD) Alumni Chapter	October 28, 1972	Silver Spring, Maryland	Active	
Saginaw (MI) Alumni Chapter	December 3, 1972	Saginaw, Michigan	Active	
Texarkana (TX) Alumni Chapter	May 12, 1972	Texarkana, Texas	Active	
New Rochelle-White Plains (NY) Alumni Chapter	December 9, 1972	White Plains, New York	Active	
Bahamas Alumni Chapter	January 12, 1973	Nassau, Bahamas	Active	
Rochester (NY) Alumni Chapter	March 23, 1973	Rochester, New York	Active	(Note: Chartered as the first Alumni Association in 1962.)
Langston (OK) Alumni Chapter	April 13, 1973	Langston, Oklahoma	Active	
Syracuse (NY) Alumni Chapter	September 29, 1973	Syracuse, New York	Active	
Clarksville (TN) Alumni Chapter	October 19, 1973	Clarksville, Tennessee	Inactive	
Peoria (IL) Alumni Chapter	November 17, 1973	Peoria, Illinois	Active	
Beaumont (TX) Alumni Chapter	November 24, 1973	Beaumont, Texas	Active	
Portsmouth-Suffolk (VA) Alumni Chapter	December 16, 1973	Portsmouth, Virginia	Active	
Sacramento (CA) Alumni Chapter	February 22, 1974	Sacramento, California	Active	
Colorado Springs (CO) Alumni Chapter	September 21, 1974	Colorado Springs, Colorado	Active	
Stockton (CA) Alumni Chapter	October 10, 1974	Stockton, California	Active	
Columbia (MD) Alumni Chapter	November 9, 1974	Columbia, Maryland	Active	
Anderson (IN) Alumni Chapter	November 30, 1974	Anderson, Indiana	Inactive	(Note: Chapter's charter was revoked.)
Blytheville (AR) Alumni Chapter	December 21, 1974	Blytheville, Arkansas	Active	
Moss Point (MS) Alumni Chapter	January 1, 1975	Moss Point, Mississippi	Active	
Beaufort (SC) Alumni Chapter	January 5, 1975	Beaufort, South Carolina	Inactive	
Monterey (CA) Alumni Chapter	January 17, 1975	Monterey, California	Active	
Waukegan (IL) Alumni Chapter	March 15, 1975	Waukegan, Illinois	Active	
Rock Island (IL) Alumni Chapter	March 22, 1975	Rock Island, Illinois	Inactive	
Charlottesville (VA) Alumni Chapter	April 5, 1975	Charlottesville, Virginia	Active	
Vallejo-Fairfield (CA) Alumni Chapter	April 12, 1975	Fairfield, California	Active	
Gulfport (MS) Alumni Chapter	April 10, 1975	Gulfport, Mississippi	Active	
Aiken (SC) Alumni Chapter	September 20, 1975	Aiken, South Carolina	Active	
Frankfort (KY) Alumni Chapter	September 20, 1975	Frankfort, Kentucky	Active	
Sparta (GA) Alumni Chapter	October 4, 1975	Sparta, Georgia	Inactive	
Farmville (VA) Alumni Chapter	December 13, 1975	Farmville, Virginia	Inactive	
Lynchburg (VA) Alumni Chapter	December 14, 1975	Lynchburg, Virginia	Active	
Maywood-Wheaton (IL) Alumni Chapter	January 11, 1976	Wheaton, Illinois	Active	
Norman (OK) Alumni Chapter	January 15, 1976	Norman, Oklahoma	Active	
Stamford (CT) Alumni Chapter	May 9, 1976	Stamford, Connecticut	Active	
Alexandria-Fairfax (VA) Alumni Chapter	June 5, 1976	Alexandria, Virginia	Active	
Anniston-Piedmont (AL) Alumni Chapter	September 15, 1976	Anniston, Alabama	Active	
Bowling Green (KY) Alumni Chapter	October 17, 1976	Bowling Green, Kentucky	Active	
Binghamton (NY) Alumni Chapter	November 9, 1976	Binghamton, New York	Inactive	
Bakersfield (CA) Alumni Chapter	January 11, 1977	Bakersfield, California	Active	
Pompano Beach (FL) Alumni Chapter	January 14, 1977	Pompano Beach, Florida	Active	
Salisbury (MD) Alumni Chapter	January 24, 1977	Salisbury, Maryland	Active	
Killeen (TX) Alumni Chapter	January 29, 1977	Killeen, Texas	Active	(Note: Originally chartered as the Killeen-Fort Hood Alumni Chapter. In 2023, after the fort was renamed Fort Cavazos, the chapter removed 'Fort Hood' from its name.)
Dothan (AL) Alumni Chapter	April 17, 1977	Dothan, Alabama	Active	
Long Beach-Inglewood-South Bay (CA) Alumni Chapter	April 30, 1977	Inglewood, California	Active	(Note: Originally chartered as the Long Beach Alumni Chapter. In 1984, the Grand Board approved a name change to the Long Beach-Inglewood-South Bay Alumni Chapter to reflect an expanded service area.)
Ventura (CA) Alumni Chapter	April 30, 1977	Ventura, California	Active	
Bloomington (IN) Alumni Chapter	May 1, 1977	Bloomington, Indiana	Inactive	
Kinston (NC) Alumni Chapter	September 10, 1977	Kinston, North Carolina	Inactive	
New Brunswick (NJ) Alumni Chapter	March 9, 1978	New Brunswick, New Jersey	Active	
LaGrange (GA) Alumni Chapter	April 9, 1978	LaGrange, Georgia	Active	
Walterboro (SC) Alumni Chapter	April 12, 1978	Walterboro, South Carolina	Active	
Palo Alto (CA) Alumni Chapter	April 15, 1978	Palo Alto, California	Active	
Cocoa Merritt Island (FL) Alumni Chapter	June 15, 1978	Rockledge, Florida	Inactive	
Fort Myers (FL) Alumni Chapter	December 16, 1978	Fort Myers, Florida	Active	
Florence (AL) Alumni Chapter	February 17, 1979	Florence, Alabama	Active	
Hyattsville-Landover (MD) Alumni Chapter	March 18, 1979	Bowie, Maryland	Active	
Selma (AL) Alumni Chapter	April 4, 1979	Selma, Alabama	Active	
Carbondale (IL) Alumni Chapter	November 18, 1979	Carbondale, Illinois	Inactive	
Bowling Green (OH) Alumni Chapter	February 19, 1980	Bowling Green, Ohio	Inactive	
Madison (WI) Alumni Chapter	March 15, 1980	Madison, Wisconsin	Active	
Terre Haute (IN) Alumni Chapter	March 22, 1980	Terre Haute, Indiana	Inactive	
Sumter (SC) Alumni Chapter	May 3, 1980	Sumter, South Carolina	Inactive	
Prichard (AL) Alumni Chapter	August 30, 1980	Prichard, Alabama	Active	
Muncie (IN) Alumni Chapter	October 25, 1980	Muncie, Indiana	Inactive	
Fort Gregg-Adams (VA) Alumni Chapter	November 22, 1980	Chester, Virginia	Active	(Note: Formerly the Fort Lee (VA) Alumni Chapter, the fort's name was changed in 2023.)
Sarasota (FL) Alumni Chapter	March 7, 1981	Sarasota, Florida	Active	
Northport (AL) Alumni Chapter	March 19, 1981	Northport, Alabama	Active	
Corpus Christi (TX) Alumni Chapter	March 28, 1981	Corpus Christi, Texas	Active	
College Park (GA) Alumni Chapter	April 4, 1981 – August 31, 1983; April 5, 1997	College Park, Georgia	Inactive	
Decatur (GA) Alumni Chapter	April 4, 1981	Decatur, Georgia	Active	
Lansing (MI) Alumni Chapter	April 5, 1981	Lansing, Michigan	Active	
Asheville (NC) Alumni Chapter	April 11, 1981	Asheville, North Carolina	Active	
Fort Knox (KY) Alumni Chapter	April 12, 1981	Fort Knox, Kentucky	Active	
Korea Alumni Chapter	April 19, 1981	Seoul, South Korea	Active	
Joliet (IL) Alumni Chapter	July 8, 1981	Joliet, Illinois	Active	
Willingboro-Fort Dix-McGuire Air Force Base (NJ) Alumni Chapter	July 10, 1981	Willingboro Township, New Jersey	Active	
Daphne (AL) Alumni Chapter	July 12, 1981	Daphne, Alabama	Active	
Anchorage (AK) Alumni Chapter	August 20, 1981	Anchorage, Alaska	Active	
Iowa City-Cedar Rapids (IA) Alumni Chapter	September 12, 1981	Iowa City, Iowa	Active	
Columbia (MO) Alumni Chapter	September 20, 1981	Columbia, Missouri	Inactive	
Belle Glade-Pahokee (FL) Alumni Chapter	February 27, 1981	Belle Glade, Florida	Active	
Camden-Magnolia-El Dorado (AR) Alumni Chapter	November 14, 1981	Camden, Arkansas	Active	(Note: Originally chartered as the Camden Alumni Chapter.)
Beckley (WV) Alumni Chapter	August 26, 1981	Beckley, West Virginia	Active	
Goldsboro (NC) Alumni Chapter	September 26, 1981	Goldsboro, North Carolina	Active	
Talladega-Sylacauga (AL) Alumni Chapter	January 16, 1982	Talladega, Alabama	Active	
Williamsburg (VA) Alumni Chapter	January 30, 1982	Williamsburg, Virginia	Inactive	
Frederick (MD) Alumni Chapter	March 27, 1982	Frederick, Maryland	Active	
Fort Pierce (FL) Alumni Chapter	April 17, 1982	Fort Pierce, Florida	Active	
Montclair (NJ) Alumni Chapter	May 22, 1982	Montclair, New Jersey	Active	
Moncks Corner (SC) Alumni Chapter	June 25, 1982	Moncks Corner, South Carolina	Active	
Delray Beach (FL) Alumni Chapter	January 9, 1983	Delray Beach, Florida	Active	
Paducah (KY) Alumni Chapter	March 12, 1983	Paducah, Kentucky	Active	
Columbus (MS) Alumni Chapter	June 18, 1983	Columbus, Mississippi	Active	
Denmark (SC) Alumni Chapter	July 30, 1983	Denmark, South Carolina	Active	
Kalamazoo (MI) Alumni Chapter	July 30, 1983	Kalamazoo, Michigan	Active	
Valdosta (GA) Alumni Chapter	November 11, 1983	Valdosta, Georgia	Active	
Fort Benning (GA) Alumni Chapter	March 31, 1984	Fort Moore, Georgia	Inactive	
Kenner (LA) Alumni Chapter	March 31, 1984	Kenner, Louisiana	Active	
Chesapeake-Virginia Beach (VA) Alumni Chapter	April 1, 1984	Virginia Beach, Virginia	Active	
Erie (PA) Alumni Chapter	April 7, 1984	Erie, Pennsylvania	Active	
Richfield-Bloomington (MN) Alumni Chapter	May 19, 1984	Woodbury, Minnesota	Active	(Note: Chapter was chartered as the Richfield Alumni Chapter and added Bloomington to its name in 1990. Its charter was revoked for a time.)
Upper Marlboro-Waldorf (MD) Alumni Chapter	August 24, 1984	Fort Washington, Maryland	Active	
Lumberton (NC) Alumni Chapter	August 26, 1984	Lumberton, North Carolina	Active	
Bermuda Alumni Chapter	April 15, 1985	Hamilton, Bermuda	Active	
Bloomington-Normal (IL) Alumni Chapter	July 12, 1985	Bloomington, Illinois	Active	
Hinesville (GA) Alumni Chapter	July 12, 1985	Hinesville, Georgia	Inactive	
Albuquerque (NM) Alumni Chapter	July 27, 1985	Albuquerque, New Mexico	Active	
Tacoma (WA) Alumni Chapter	July 27, 1985	Tacoma, Washington	Active	
Ahoskie (NC) Alumni Chapter	November 15, 1985	Ahoskie, North Carolina	Active	
Norristown (PA) Alumni Chapter	January 25, 1986	Norristown, Pennsylvania	Active	
Tallulah (LA) Alumni Chapter	March 9, 1986	Tallulah, Louisiana	Inactive	
Greenville (NC) Alumni Chapter	March 16, 1986	Greenville, North Carolina	Active	
Fort Polk (LA) Alumni Chapter	March 22, 1986	Fort Johnson South, Louisiana	Inactive	
Southfield (MI) Alumni Chapter	July 19, 1986	Southfield, Michigan	Active	
San Fernando Valley (CA) Alumni Chapter	September 20, 1986	San Fernando Valley, California	Inactive	
Lafayette (LA) Alumni Chapter	October 18, 1986	Lafayette, Louisiana	Active	
Arlington-Grand Prairie (TX) Alumni Chapter	October 25, 1986	Grand Prairie, Texas	Active	
Centerville (OH) Alumni Chapter	October 25, 1986	Centerville, Ohio	Inactive	
Murfreesboro (TN) Alumni Chapter	November 22, 1986	Murfreesboro, Tennessee	Active	
Bellevue (WA) Alumni Chapter	May 3, 1987	Bellevue, Washington	Active	
Englewood-Teaneck (NJ) Alumni Chapter	March 22, 1987	Teaneck, New Jersey	Active	
Vicksburg (MS) Alumni Chapter	May 30, 1987	Vicksburg, Mississippi	Active	
Holly Springs (MS) Alumni Chapter	June 30, 1987	Holly Springs, Mississippi	Inactive	
Canton (OH) Alumni Chapter	December 6, 1987	Canton, Ohio	Active	
Auburn-Opelika (AL) Alumni Chapter	October 24, 1987	Auburn, Alabama	Inactive	
Kennewick-Richland-Pasco (WA) Alumni Chapter	February 13, 1988	Tri-Cities, Washington	Active	
Gastonia-Shelby (NC) Alumni Chapter	March 5, 1988	Gastonia, North Carolina	Active	
Plainfield (NJ) Alumni Chapter	March 19, 1988	Plainfield, New Jersey	Active	
Fort Walton Beach (FL) Alumni Chapter	April 23, 1988	Fort Walton Beach, Florida	Active	
Chester (PA) Alumni Chapter	June 25, 1988	Chester, Pennsylvania	Active	
Missouri City-Sugarland (TX) Alumni Chapter	August 6, 1988	Missouri City, Texas	Active	(Note: Originally chartered as the Missouri City Alumni Chapter. In 2007, the Grand Board approved a name change to the Missouri City-Sugar Land Alumni Chapter.)
Panama Alumni Chapter	November 3, 1988	Panama City, Panama	Inactive	
Providence (RI) Alumni Chapter	December 9, 1988	Providence, Rhode Island	Inactive	
Stone Mountain-Lithonia (GA) Alumni Chapter	December 18, 1988	Stone Mountain, Georgia	Inactive	
Thomasville (GA) Alumni Chapter	December 23, 1988	Thomasville, Georgia	Active	
Gaithersburg-Rockville (MD) Alumni Chapter	January 20, 1989	Gaithersburg, Maryland	Active	
Japan Alumni Chapter	February 12, 1989	Okinawa, Japan	Active	
Lincoln (NE) Alumni Chapter	May 20, 1989	Lincoln, Nebraska	Active	
Springfield (MA) Alumni Chapter	June 23, 1989	Springfield, Massachusetts	Active	
Fort Drum (NY) Alumni Chapter	August 12, 1989	Fort Drum, New York	Inactive	
Alpharetta-Smyrna (GA) Alumni Chapter	September 21, 1989	Alpharetta, Georgia	Active	
Grand Bahama Alumni Chapter	October 21, 1989	Freeport, Bahamas	Inactive	
Cary (NC) Alumni Chapter	October 28, 1989	Cary, North Carolina	Active	
Queens (NY) Alumni Chapter	March 10, 1990	Queens, New York	Active	
Germantown (TN) Alumni Chapter	June 1, 1990	Germantown, Tennessee	Active	
United Kingdom Alumni Chapter	June 16, 1990	London, England	Active	
Natchitoches (LA) Alumni Chapter	May 18, 1991	Natchitoches, Louisiana	Active	
Greenwood (SC) Alumni Chapter	May 24, 1991	Greenwood, South Carolina	Active	
Victorville (CA) Alumni Chapter	December 14, 1991	Victorville, California	Inactive	
Winter Park (FL) Alumni Chapter	March 14, 1992	Winter Park, Florida	Active	
Brunswick (GA) Alumni Chapter	June 18, 1993	Brunswick, Georgia	Active	
Evergreen Park (IL) Alumni Chapter	August 27, 1993	Evergreen Park, Illinois	Active	
Richardson-Plano (TX) Alumni Chapter	December 2, 1994	Richardson, Texas	Active	
Anderson (SC) Alumni Chapter	December 2, 1994	Anderson, South Carolina	Active	
Longview-Kilgore (TX) Alumni Chapter	December 17, 1994	Longview, Texas	Inactive	
Hendersonville (TN) Alumni Chapter	March 17, 1995	Hendersonville, Tennessee	Active	
Bossier City (LA) Alumni Chapter	April 15, 1995	Bossier City, Louisiana	Active	
Franklin-Southampton (VA) Alumni Chapter	June 3, 1995	Franklin, Virginia	Inactive	
Lancaster-Palmdale (CA) Alumni Chapter	October 1, 1995	Lancaster, California	Active	
Saint Thomas USVI Alumni Chapter	November 16, 1995	Charlotte Amalie, U.S. Virgin Islands	Inactive	
Fayetteville (AR) Alumni Chapter	December 14, 1996	Fayetteville, Arkansas	Active	
Rayville (LA) Alumni Chapter	December 29, 1996	Rayville, Louisiana	Active	
Denton-Lewisville (TX) Alumni Chapter	March 1, 1997	Denton, Texas	Active	
Gaffney (SC) Alumni Chapter	June 22, 1997	Gaffney, South Carolina	Active	
Richmond-Perrine (FL) Alumni Chapter	November 15, 1997	Miami, Florida	Active	
Woodbridge (VA) Alumni Chapter	February 1, 1998	Woodbridge, Virginia	Active	
West Helena (AR) Alumni Chapter	February 22, 1998	West Helena, Arkansas	Active	
Danville (VA) Alumni Chapter	June 13, 1998	Danville, Virginia	Active	
Houma-Thibodaux (LA) Alumni Chapter	August 8, 1998	Thibodaux, Louisiana	Active	
DeKalb (IL) Alumni Chapter	September 26, 1998	DeKalb, Illinois	Inactive	
Saint Croix USVI Alumni Chapter	February 4, 2000	Christiansted, U.S. Virgin Islands	Inactive	
Tupelo (MS) Alumni Chapter	July 22, 2000	Tupelo, Mississippi	Inactive	
Blacksburg (VA) Alumni Chapter	January 27, 2001	Blacksburg, Virginia	Inactive	
Jonesboro (AR) Alumni Chapter	June 30, 2001	Jonesboro, Arkansas	Active	
Camden (SC) Alumni Chapter	July 28, 2001	Camden, South Carolina	Active	
Hinesville-Fort Stewart (GA) Alumni Chapter	September 8, 2002	Hinesville, Georgia	Inactive	
Canton-Madison (MS) Alumni Chapter	December 6, 2002	Ridgeland, Mississippi	Active	
Conway (AR) Alumni Chapter	February 14, 2003	Conway, Arkansas	Active	
Atlantic City (NJ) Alumni Chapter	March 1, 2003	Atlantic City, New Jersey	Active	
Cleveland (MS) Alumni Chapter	March 23, 2003	Cleveland, Mississippi	Active	
Independence (MO) Alumni Chapter	March 23, 2003	Independence, Missouri	Active	
Stockbridge-Jonesboro (GA) Alumni Chapter	April 12, 2003	Conyers, Georgia	Active	
Spartanburg (SC) Alumni Chapter	September 26, 2003	Spartanburg, South Carolina	Active	(Note: Was originally a collective chapter with the Greenville Alumni Chapter as the Greenville-Spartanburg Alumni Chapter between 1965 and 2003.)
Bowie-Mitchellville (MD) Alumni Chapter	October 4, 2003	Bowie, Maryland	Active	
Harvey-Markham (IL) Alumni Chapter	January 10, 2004	Harvey, Illinois	Active	
Fresno (CA) Alumni Chapter	May 1, 2004	Fresno, California	Active	
Hartsville (SC) Alumni Chapter	October 2, 2004	Hartsville, South Carolina	Active	
Roseville (CA) Alumni Chapter	December 15, 2004	Roseville, California	Active	
Johannesburg-Pretoria South Africa Alumni Chapter	December 16, 2004	Johannesburg-Pretoria, South Africa	Active	
College Park-Sandy Spring (MD) Alumni Chapter	May 15, 2005	College Park, Maryland	Active	
Carrollton-Douglasville (GA) Alumni Chapter	June 17, 2005	Douglasville, Georgia	Active	
Beverly Hills-Century City (CA) Alumni Chapter	July 10, 2005	Beverly Hills, California	Active	
Abington-Ambler (PA) Alumni Chapter	October 22, 2005	Jenkintown, Pennsylvania	Active	
Hammond (LA) Alumni Chapter	April 7, 2006	Hammond, Louisiana	Active	
Roanoke Rapids (NC) Alumni Chapter	April 15, 2006	Roanoke Rapids, North Carolina	Active	
Miramar-Pembroke Pines (FL) Alumni Chapter	February 4, 2007	Pembroke Pines, Florida	Active	
Decatur-Athens (AL) Alumni Chapter	January 27, 2007	Madison, Alabama	Active	
Cape Town-Western Cape South Africa Alumni Chapter	March 2, 2007	Cape Town, Western Cape, South Africa	Inactive	
Statesboro (GA) Alumni Chapter	March 10, 2007	Statesboro, Georgia	Active	
Fort Washington (MD) Alumni Chapter	April 29, 2007	Fort Washington, Maryland	Active	
Richton Park (IL) Alumni Chapter	June 9, 2007	Richton Park, Illinois	Active	
Lawrenceville-Duluth (GA) Alumni Chapter	March 7, 2008	Duluth, Georgia	Active	
Belleville-O'Fallon (IL) Alumni Chapter	May 3, 2008	Belleville, Illinois	Active	
Hot Springs-Arkadelphia-Malvern (AR) Alumni Chapter	September 20, 2008	Hot Springs, Arkansas	Active	
Oxford (MS) Alumni Chapter	January 31, 2009	Oxford, Mississippi	Active	
Jersey City (NJ) Alumni Chapter	February 6, 2009	Jersey City, New Jersey	Active	
Bronx (NY) Alumni Chapter	February 20, 2009	Bronx, New York	Active	
Dulles-Leesburg (VA) Alumni Chapter	March 21, 2009	Ashburn, Virginia	Active	
Edisto (SC) Alumni Chapter	April 16, 2009	Edisto, South Carolina	Active	
Lagos Nigeria Alumni Chapter	April 16, 2009	Lagos, Nigeria	Active	
Maplewood-Oranges (NJ) Alumni Chapter	June 21, 2009	South Orange, New Jersey	Active	
Leonardtown-Prince Frederick (MD) Alumni Chapter	July 11, 2009	Leonardtown, Maryland	Inactive	
Spring-The Woodlands-Huntsville (TX) Alumni Chapter	July 18, 2009	Spring, Texas	Active	
Mansfield-Cedar Hill (TX) Alumni Chapter	July 25, 2009	Mansfield, Texas	Active	
Carlsbad-Laguna-Temecula (CA) Alumni Chapter	November 20, 2009	Temecula, California	Active	
Brentwood (TN) Alumni Chapter	October 2, 2010	Brentwood, Tennessee	Active	
Irvine-Anaheim (CA) Alumni Chapter	January 29, 2011	Irvine, California	Active	
Alabaster-Pelham (AL) Alumni Chapter	January 31, 2011	Alabaster, Alabama	Active	
Conyers-Covington (GA) Alumni Chapter	November 12, 2011	Conyers, Georgia	Active	
Burlington (NC) Alumni Chapter	November 20, 2011	Burlington, North Carolina	Active	
Wake Forest-Rolesville (NC) Alumni Chapter	December 17, 2011	Wake Forest, North Carolina	Active	
Salt Lake City-Ogden (UT) Alumni Chapter	May 2, 2012	Salt Lake City, Utah	Inactive	
Huntington (WV) Alumni Chapter	September 8, 2012	Huntington, West Virginia	Inactive	
Edwardsville-Collinsville (IL) Alumni Chapter	January 6, 2013	O'Fallon, Illinois	Active	
Hickory (NC) Alumni Chapter	January 11, 2013	Hickory, North Carolina	Active	
Corning-Elmira (NY) Alumni Chapter	February 9, 2013	Corning, New York	Active	
Troy (AL) Alumni Chapter	March 1, 2013	Troy, Alabama	Active	
Southaven (MS) Alumni Chapter	June 29, 2013	Southaven, Mississippi	Active	
San Fernando-Santa Clarita (CA) Alumni Chapter	November 1, 2013	North Hollywood, California	Active	
Beaufort-Jasper-Hilton Head (SC) Alumni Chapter	February 21, 2014	Beaufort, South Carolina	Active	
New Bern (NC) Alumni Chapter	March 7, 2014	New Bern, North Carolina	Active	
Bishopville-Manning-Shaw AFB (SC) Alumni Chapter	March 26, 2016	Columbia, South Carolina	Active	
Newnan-Fairburn (GA) Alumni Chapter	August 12, 2016	Newnan, Georgia	Active	
West Memphis-Marion (AR) Alumni Chapter	August 27, 2016	Marion, Arkansas	Active	
Leesburg (FL) Alumni Chapter	November 18, 2016	Leesburg, Florida	Active	
Clarksdale (MS) Alumni Chapter	December 10, 2016	Clarksdale, Mississippi	Active	
Americus (GA) Alumni Chapter	July 7, 2017	Americus, Georgia	Active	
Dublin (GA) Alumni Chapter	August 26, 2017	Dublin, Georgia	Active	(Note: Originally chartered as the Dublin-Laurens (GA) Alumni Chapter.)
Corinth (MS) Alumni Chapter	September 2, 2017	Corinth, Mississippi	Active	
Calumet City-Lansing (IL) Alumni Chapter	December 7, 2018	Lansing, Illinois	Active	
Newport-Covington (KY) Alumni Chapter	February 8, 2020	Highland Heights, Kentucky	Active	
Pearland-Manvel-Fresno (TX) Alumni Chapter	February 22, 2020	Pearland, Texas	Active	
Commerce-Greenville (TX) Alumni Chapter	March 14, 2020	Greenville, Texas	Active	
Abu Dhabi Alumni Chapter	July 25, 2020	Abu Dhabi, United Arab Emirates	Active	
Canada Alumni Chapter	September 19, 2020	Toronto, Ontario, Canada	Active	
Towson-Catonsville (MD) Alumni Chapter	November 20, 2021	Towson, Maryland	Active	
Nassau-Suffolk (NY) Alumni Chapter	February 26, 2022	Hicksville, New York	Active	
Katy-Fulshear (TX) Alumni Chapter	March 6, 2022	Katy, Texas	Active	
Frisco (TX) Alumni Chapter	March 12, 2022	Frisco, Texas	Active	
Bristol-Kingsport-Johnson City (TN) Alumni Chapter	March 25, 2022	Kingsport, Tennessee	Active	
West Chester-Coatesville (PA) Alumni Chapter	May 7, 2022	West Chester, Pennsylvania	Active	
Brookfield (WI) Alumni Chapter	October 22, 2022	Brookfield, Wisconsin	Active	
Greenwood-Grenada (MS) Alumni Chapter	October 29, 2022	Greenwood, Mississippi	Active	
Dominican Republic Alumni Chapter	January 15, 2023	Punta Cana, Dominican Republic	Active	
Gainesville Manassas (VA) Alumni Chapter	March 23, 2023	Gainesville, Virginia	Active	
Prattville (AL) Alumni Chapter	June 3, 2023	Prattville, Alabama	Active	
Glendale-Peoria (AZ) Alumni Chapter	August 5, 2023	Glendale, Arizona	Active	
New Braunfels (TX) Alumni Chapter	September 15, 2023	New Braunfels, Texas	Active	
Grovetown-Evans-Martinez (GA) Alumni Chapter	December 17, 2023	Columbia County, Georgia	Active	
Franklin (LA) Alumni Chapter	January 20, 2024	Franklin, Louisiana	Active	
Macomb (MI) Alumni Chapter	February 20, 2024	Macomb Township, Michigan	Active	
South Fulton (GA) Alumni Chapter	November 3, 2024	South Fulton, Georgia	Active	
Oak Park-River Forest (IL) Alumni Chapter	December 15, 2024	Oak Park, Illinois	Active	
Slidell (LA) Alumni Chapter	December 21, 2024	Slidell, Louisiana	Active	
St. Augustine (FL) Alumni Chapter	December 21, 2024	St. Augustine, Florida	Active	
Salisbury (NC) Alumni Chapter	May 30, 2025	Salisbury, North Carolina	Active	
Sanford-Pinehurst (NC) Alumni Chapter	May 31, 2025	Sanford, North Carolina	Active	
Diamond Bar-Ontario-Pomona (CA) Alumni Chapter	June 21, 2025	Rancho Cucamonga, California	Active	
Trussville-Pell City (AL) Alumni Chapter	September 21, 2025	Trussville, Alabama	Active	
Richmond Hill-Midway (GA) Alumni Chapter	December 5, 2025	Richmond Hill, Georgia	Active	
Ocala (FL) Alumni Chapter	November 23, 2025	Ocala, Florida	Active	
Mexico Alumni Chapter	February 27, 2026	Playa Del Carmen, Quintana Roo, Mexico	Active	
Gonzales (LA) Alumni Chapter	March 21, 2026	Gonzales, Louisiana	Active	
Milledgeville (GA) Alumni Chapter	October 26, 2026	Milledgeville, Georgia	Active	
