= DeRidder–Fort Johnson South combined statistical area =

Coordinates: 30°54′N 93°18′W

DeRidder–Fort Johnson South Metropolitan Area
- Combined Statistical Area
- West Central Louisiana
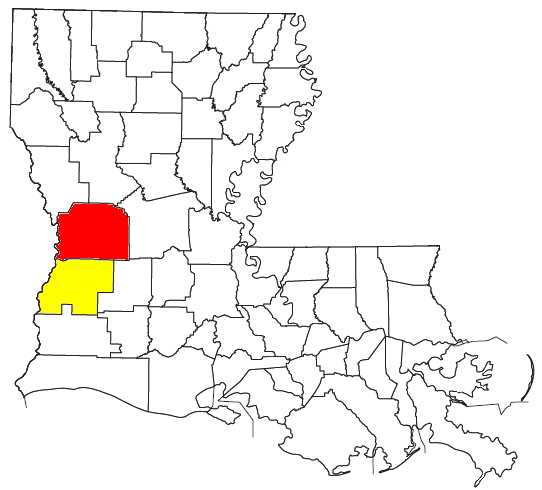
- Location of the Fort Johnson South–DeRidder CSA and its components: Fort Johnson Micropolitan Statistical Area DeRidder Micropolitan Statistical Area
- Interactive map of DeRidder–Fort Johnson South; Metropolitan Area
- Country: United States
- State: Louisiana
- Parishes: Beauregard; Vernon
- Principal city: DeRidder; Fort Johnson South (unincorporated)
- Largest city: DeRidder

The DeRidder–Fort Johnson South, LA combined statistical area is made up of two parishes in central Louisiana. The statistical area consists of the Fort Johnson South Micropolitan Statistical Area and the DeRidder Micropolitan Statistical Area. As of the 2000 census, the CSA had a population of 85,517. The population decreased slightly in 2020 to 85,299.

== Parishes ==
- Beauregard
- Vernon

== Communities ==
- Places with more than 10,000 inhabitants
  - DeRidder
  - Fort Johnson South (Principal city and census-designated place)
- Places with 5,000 to 10,000 inhabitants
  - New Llano (Principal city)
  - Leesville
- Places with 1,000 to 5,000 inhabitants
  - Fort Johnson North (census-designated place)
  - Merryville
  - New Llano
  - Rosepine
- Places with less than 1,000 inhabitants
  - Anacoco
  - Hornbeck
  - Simpson

== Demographics ==
As of the census of 2000, there were 85,517 people, 30,364 households, and 22,791 families residing within the CSA. The racial makeup of the CSA was 77.77% White, 15.46% African American, 1.15% Native American, 1.20% Asian, 0.21% Pacific Islander, 1.65% from other races, and 2.56% from two or more races. Hispanic or Latino of any race were 4.19% of the population.

The median income for a household in the CSA was $31,899, and the median income for a family was $36,283. Males had a median income of $30,860 versus $20,028 for females. The per capita income for the CSA was $14,775.

== See also ==
- Louisiana census statistical areas
- List of cities, towns, and villages in Louisiana
- List of census-designated places in Louisiana
