= Central Louisiana =

Coordinates: 31.4°N 92.8°W

- Region
- Cenla
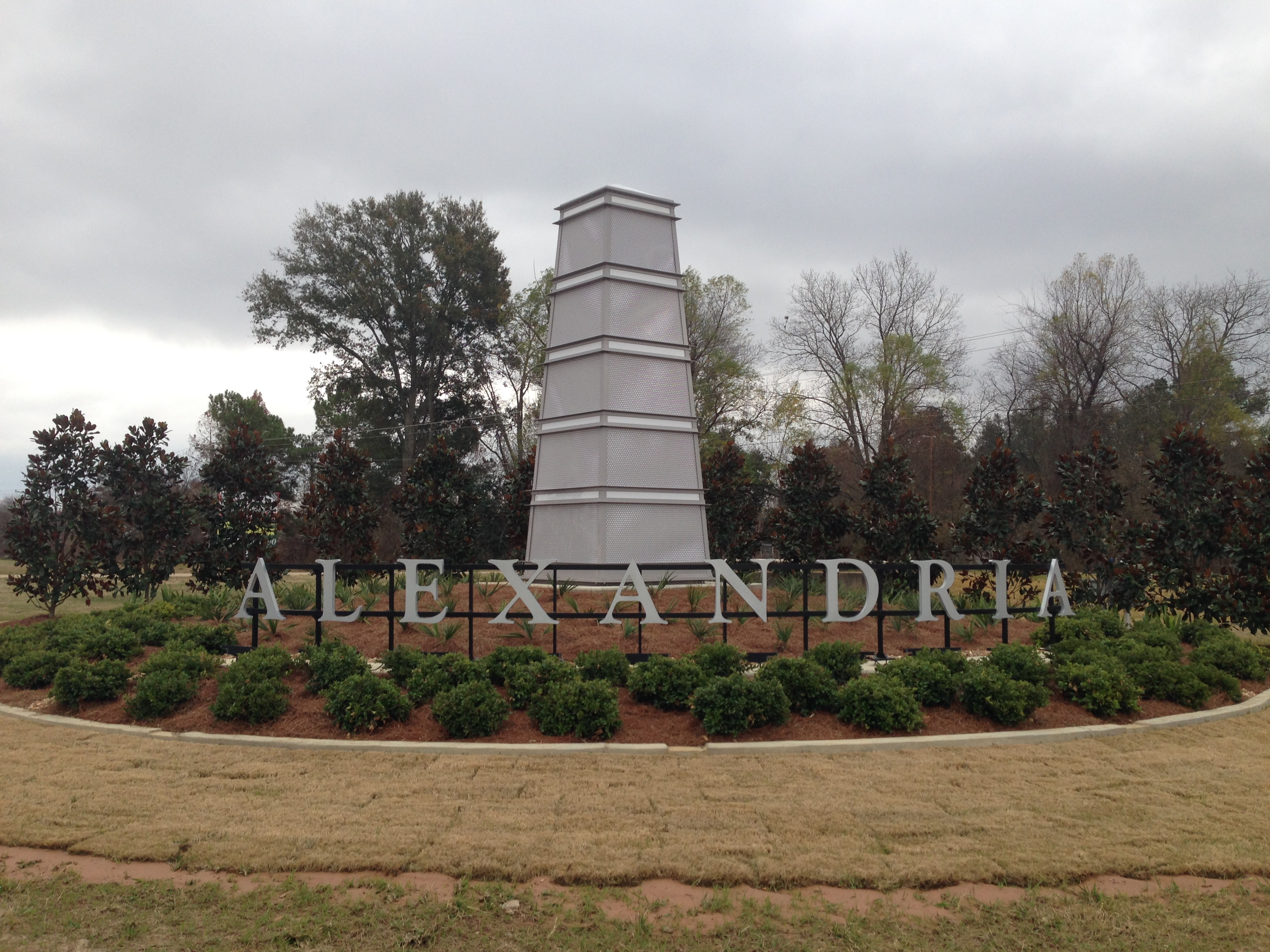
- Alexandria

- The Central Louisiana region is shaded in green.
- Country: United States
- State: Louisiana
- Largest city: Alexandria

Central Louisiana (French: Centre du Louisiane), also known as the Crossroads, is a region of the U.S. state of Louisiana.

The largest communities in the region as of the 2010 Census were Alexandria (47,893), Natchitoches (18,323) and Pineville (14,555).

Central Louisiana is a land of physical and cultural diversity. Extensive prairies, piney hill region known as the Louisiana Central Hill Country, minor swamplands and deciduous forests make up its geography. It also has clear streams with sandy bottoms and large rivers that carry waterborne freight.

== Metro/Micropolitan areas ==
There is one Combined Statistical Area, one Metropolitan Statistical Area, and four Micropolitan Statistical Areas that include Central Louisiana parishes.

- Alexandria Metropolitan Statistical Area (Rapides and Grant parishes)
- Fort Polk South-DeRidder Combined Statistical Area
  - Fort Polk South Micropolitan Statistical Area (Vernon Parish)
  - DeRidder Micropolitan Statistical Area (Beauregard Parish)
- Natchez, Mississippi Micropolitan Statistical Area (Concordia Parish and Adams County, MS)
- Natchitoches Micropolitan Statistical Area (Natchitoches Parish)

== Region ==
The economic region is Kisatchie-Delta, described as the Sixth State Planning District for the State of Louisiana, including parishes collectively bordered on the east by the Mississippi River, on the west by the Sabine River, with the Red River traversing northwest to southeast into the Atchafalaya, and the Four Rivers at Jonesville (Ouachita, Little, Black, and Trinity) merging, and the waters joining at the northern end of America's Swamp, the Atchafalaya Basin and Heritage Area. The predominately rural region has a more urban center of twin cities, Alexandria and Pineville, literally in the middle of Louisiana. The area's growing seasons are benefitted by a "frostline" location, so soils and the climate can support both cotton and sugarcane.

=== Formation of the region ===
These crossroads initially began in the 1800s as settlers migrated West and have designation as the Louisiana Colonial Trails Scenic Byways, including the historic El-Camino Real East-West Corridor. The Louisiana Colonial Trails Association is the corridor manager and a demonstrated regional partnership that celebrates the "crossroads of cultures" by partnering organizations voluntarily collaborating throughout central Louisiana, including the Alexandria-Pineville Area Convention and Visitors Bureau, the Avoyelles Commission on Tourism, the Vernon Parish Tourism, Kisatchie-Delta Regional Planning & Development District, the Kent House, the Louisiana Political Museum (and Hall of Fame) at Winnfield, and others in the region. Generally, the region includes Avoyelles, Catahoula, Concordia, Grant, LaSalle, Rapides, Vernon and Winn Parishes, with some organizations also sharing Allen or Natchitoches Parish in their service areas, and less often also Beauregard Parish in the "cenLa" description.

==== Economic history ====
This region's crossroads of cultures and early transportation routes influenced its foundations in historical economic assets. grown locally from its piney woods and delta (Mississippi, Red, and Sabine Rivers) natural resources to forge into strongholds of agricultural and timber production. Over time, significant roles for centralized public activities and services with AEX, the ports at Central Louisiana Regional Port (Alexandria, LA), Vidalia, and Simmesport, alongside the military history and government activities (former Fort Polk, historic (closed) England Air Force Base, Camp Claiborne, and former Camp Beauregard) contributed to a center of activity and local services, leading to a concentration of educational and medical services and associated employment. Commercial air service and industrial development were launched at the former EAFB through the England Air Park, to convert the BRAC-closed facility into an economic development asset, and a component of the multi-modal assets, also served by the Central Louisiana Regional Port and its activated Foreign Trade Zone-subzone. This regional center also has a concentration of higher education including Louisiana State University at Alexandria and Central Louisiana Technical and Community College, a satellite campus of the Northwestern State University at England Airpark (formerly the Learning Center), and Louisiana Christian University in Pineville, LA.

References to the economic history are located in the Comprehensive Economic Development Strategy, as prepared by the Economic Development District: Kisatchie-Delta Regional Planning & Development District.(See also, CEDS ONLINE: KISATCHIE-DELTA REGIONAL STRATEGY for a 'living' version of the region's CEDS.)

- West Central Louisiana (Beauregard, Sabine and Vernon Parishes)

== Parishes ==
Central Louisiana consists of the following 10 parishes, with population figures given in parentheses.

- Allen (25,684)
- Beauregard (36,927)
- Catahoula (9,921)
- Concordia (19,920)
- Grant (22,365)
- LaSalle (15,052)
- Natchitoches (39,162)
- Rapides (132,424)
- Sabine (23,977)
- Vernon (50,569)

== See also ==
- Intrastate regions
- Louisiana History Museum, Alexandria
