= Fort Polk South, Louisiana =

Fort Polk South
- Census-designated place
- Hamlet of Fort Polk South
- Location in Vernon Parish and the state of Louisiana.
- Coordinates: 31°02′49″N 93°12′40″W
- Country: United States
- State: Louisiana
- Parish: Vernon

Area
  - Total: 6.16 sq mi (15.96 km^{2})
  - Land: 6.16 sq mi (15.95 km^{2})
  - Water: 0.0039 sq mi (0.01 km^{2})

Population (2020)
  - Total: 7,950
  - Density: 1,290.9/sq mi (498.43/km^{2})
- Time zone: UTC-6 (CST)
  - Summer (DST): UTC-5 (CDT)
- ZIP code: 71459
- Area code: 337
- FIPS code: 22-26757

Fort Polk South is a census-designated place (CDP) in Vernon Parish, Louisiana, United States. The population was 11,000 at the 2000 census.

Fort Polk South is the larger principal city of the Fort Polk South-DeRidder CSA, a Combined Statistical Area that includes the Fort Polk South (Vernon Parish) and DeRidder (Beauregard Parish) micropolitan areas, which had a combined population of 85,517 at the 2000 census.

== Geography ==
Fort Polk South is located at 31°2′49″N 93°12′40″W (31.047003, -93.211213).

According to the United States Census Bureau, the CDP has a total area of 6.2 square miles (16 km^{2}), all land.

== Demographics ==
Historical population
Census	Pop.	Note	%±
1980	12,498		—
1990	10,911		−12.7%
2000	11,000		0.8%
2010	9,038		−17.8%
2020	7,950		−12.0%
U.S. Decennial Census; 1950 1960 1970 1980; 1990 2000 2010

Fort Polk South first appeared as a census designated place the 1980 U.S. Census under the name Fort Polk South.

=== Racial and ethnic composition ===
Fort Polk South CDP, Louisiana – Racial and ethnic composition Note: the US Census treats Hispanic/Latino as an ethnic category. This table excludes Latinos from the racial categories and assigns them to a separate category. Hispanics/Latinos may be of any race.
Race / Ethnicity (NH = Non-Hispanic)	Pop 2000	Pop 2010	Pop 2020	% 2000	% 2010	% 2020
White alone (NH)	6,008	5,142	4,245	54.62%	56.89%	53.40%
Black or African American alone (NH)	2,951	1,775	1,314	26.83%	19.64%	16.53%
Native American or Alaska Native alone (NH)	85	56	37	0.77%	0.62%	0.47%
Asian alone (NH)	223	186	217	2.03%	2.06%	2.73%
Native Hawaiian or Pacific Islander alone (NH)	56	72	155	0.51%	0.80%	1.95%
Other race alone (NH)	29	13	63	0.26%	0.14%	0.79%
Mixed race or Multiracial (NH)	358	446	519	3.25%	4.93%	6.53%
Hispanic or Latino (any race)	1,290	1,348	1,400	11.73%	14.91%	17.61%
Total	11,000	9,038	7,950	100.00%	100.00%	100.00%

=== 2020 census ===
As of the census of 2000, there were 11,000 people, 2,383 households, and 2,175 families residing in the CDP. The population density was 1,785.9 inhabitants per square mile (689.5/km^{2}). There were 2,864 housing units at an average density of 465.0 units per square mile (179.5 units/km^{2}). The racial makeup of the CDP was 58.8% White, 27.7% African American, 0.9% Native American, 2.2% Asian, 0.5% Pacific Islander, 5.3% from other races, and 4.6% from two or more races. Hispanic or Latino of any race were 11.7% of the population.

There were 2,383 households, out of which 72.8% had children under the age of 18 living with them, 82.8% were married couples living together, 6.0% had a female householder with no husband present, and 8.7% were non-families. 8.3% of all households were made up of individuals, and none had someone living alone who was 65 years of age or older. The average household size was 3.45 and the average family size was 3.63.

In the CDP, the population was spread out, with 33.0% under the age of 18, 29.3% from 18 to 24, 35.9% from 25 to 44, 1.7% from 45 to 64, and 0.1% who were 65 years of age or older. The median age was 22 years. For every 100 females, there were 152.4 males. For every 100 females age 18 and over, there were 181.3 males.

The median income for a household in the CDP was $32,993, and the median income for a family was $33,463. Males had a median income of $20,855 versus $17,776 for females. The per capita income for the CDP was $12,176. About 8.7% of families and 10.8% of the population were below the poverty line, including 14.1% of those under age 18 and none of those age 65 or over.

== Notable people ==
- Tiffany Hayes (b. 1989), WNBA player for the Atlanta Dream
