= Poston =

Poston may refer to:

== Events ==
- Murder of Ryan Poston, a 2012 crime that occurred in Kentucky

== People ==
- Adele Poston (1884–1979), American nurse
- Albert B. Poston (1855–1902), American teacher, preacher, and politician in Mississippi
- Bryan A. Poston (1924–2009), American politician from Louisiana
- Charles Debrille Poston (1825–1902), American politician from Arizona
- Charles M. Poston (1898–1968), American politician from Louisiana
- Dudley L. Poston Jr. (born 1940), American academic
- Elizabeth Poston (1905–1987), English composer
- Ersa Poston (1921–2009), American anti-poverty activist and civil service reformer
- Freddie L. Poston (1925–2016), American lieutenant general
- Henry Poston (1849/50–1908), British architect
- J. T. Poston (born 1993), American golfer
- Jim Poston (1945–2007), governor of the Turks and Caicos Islands
- John Poston (British Army officer) (1919–1945), British cavalry officer
- John Poston (politician) (1958–2023), American politician from Minnesota
- Lucilla Poston, British physiologist and academic
- Lurie Poston, American actor and singer
- McCracken Poston (born 1959), American criminal defense lawyer
- Ralph Poston (1923–2009), American politician from Florida
- Ramsey R. Poston (born 1966), American PR and crisis communications expert
- Robert Lincoln Poston (1891–1924), American journalist and editor
- Robert S. Poston (born 1967), American surgeon
- Ted Poston (1906–1974), American journalist and author
- Tim Poston (1945–2017), British mathematician
- Tom Poston (1921–2007), American actor

== Places ==
- Poston, Arizona, United States
  - Poston War Relocation Center, a World War II era internment camp
