= Robert Poston =

Robert Poston may refer to:

- Robert Lincoln Poston (1891–1924), American journalist and editor
- Robert S. Poston (born 1967), American surgeon
