= John Poston =

John Poston may refer to:

- John Poston (British Army officer)
- John Poston (politician), member of the Minnesota House of Representatives
