= Senator Poston =

Senator Poston may refer to:

- Bryan A. Poston (1924–2009), Louisiana State Senate
- Charles M. Poston (1898–1968), Louisiana State Senate
