= Lift Every Voice =

Lift Every Voice may refer to:

- "Lift Every Voice and Sing", a 1900 song written as a poem by James Weldon Johnson and set to music by his brother Rosamond Johnson
- Lift Every Voice and Sing (sculpture), a 1939 sculpture by Augusta Savage
- Lift Every Voice (Andrew Hill album), an album recorded in 1969 by jazz pianist Andrew Hill
- Lift Every Voice and Sing (album), an album recorded in 1971 by jazz drummer and percussionist Max Roach
- Lift Every Voice (Malachi Thompson album), 1993 album by jazz trumpeter Malachi Thompson
- Lift Every Voice (Charles Lloyd album), an album recorded in 2002 by jazz saxophonist Charles Lloyd
- Lift Every Voice, a Sunday morning television show on BET devoted to contemporary gospel music
