= Krista Knudsen =

American politician (born 1979)

Member of the Minnesota House of Representatives from the 5A district
- Incumbent
- Assumed office January 3, 2023
- Preceded by: John Poston

Personal details
- Born: December 28, 1979 (age 46)
- Party: Republican
- Spouse: Kevin
- Children: 4
- Education: Minnesota State University, Mankato (BS)
- Occupation: Business owner; Legislator
- Website: Government website Campaign website

Krista Knudsen (/kəˈnuːdsən/ kə-NOOD-sən; born December 28, 1979) is an American politician serving in the Minnesota House of Representatives since 2023. A member of the Republican Party of Minnesota, Knudsen represents District 5A in northern Minnesota, which includes the city of Park Rapids and parts of Becker, Cass, Hubbard and Wadena Counties.

== Early life, education and career ==
Knudsen attended college at Minnesota State University, Mankato, earning a bachelor's degree in social work and alcohol and drug studies.

Knudsen served on the Lake Shore City Council for eight years before becoming mayor in 2020.

== Minnesota House of Representatives ==
Knudsen was elected to the Minnesota House of Representatives in 2022. She first ran after redistricting and after three-term Republican incumbent John Poston announced he would not seek reelection.

Knudsen serves on the Education Finance and Education Policy Committees.

In 2025, Knudsen co-sponsored a bill to designate messenger RNA (mRNA) treatments, which include several COVID-19 vaccines, as "weapons of mass destruction", and make possessing or administering them a crime punishable by up to 20 years in prison. The bill was drafted by a Florida-based hypnotist and conspiracy theorist who believes that mRNA treatments are "nanoparticle injections" that amount to "biological and technological weapons of mass destruction".

== Electoral history ==
2022 Minnesota State House - District 5A
Party	Candidate	Votes	%
Republican	Krista Knudsen	14,735	70.49
Democratic (DFL)	Brian M. Hobson	6,159	29.46
Write-in		10	0.05
Total votes		20,904	100.0
Republican hold			

== Personal life ==
Knudsen lives in Lake Shore, Minnesota with her husband, Kevin, and four children.
