= Don A. Anderson =

American politician and businessman (1934–2022)

Donald Anderson
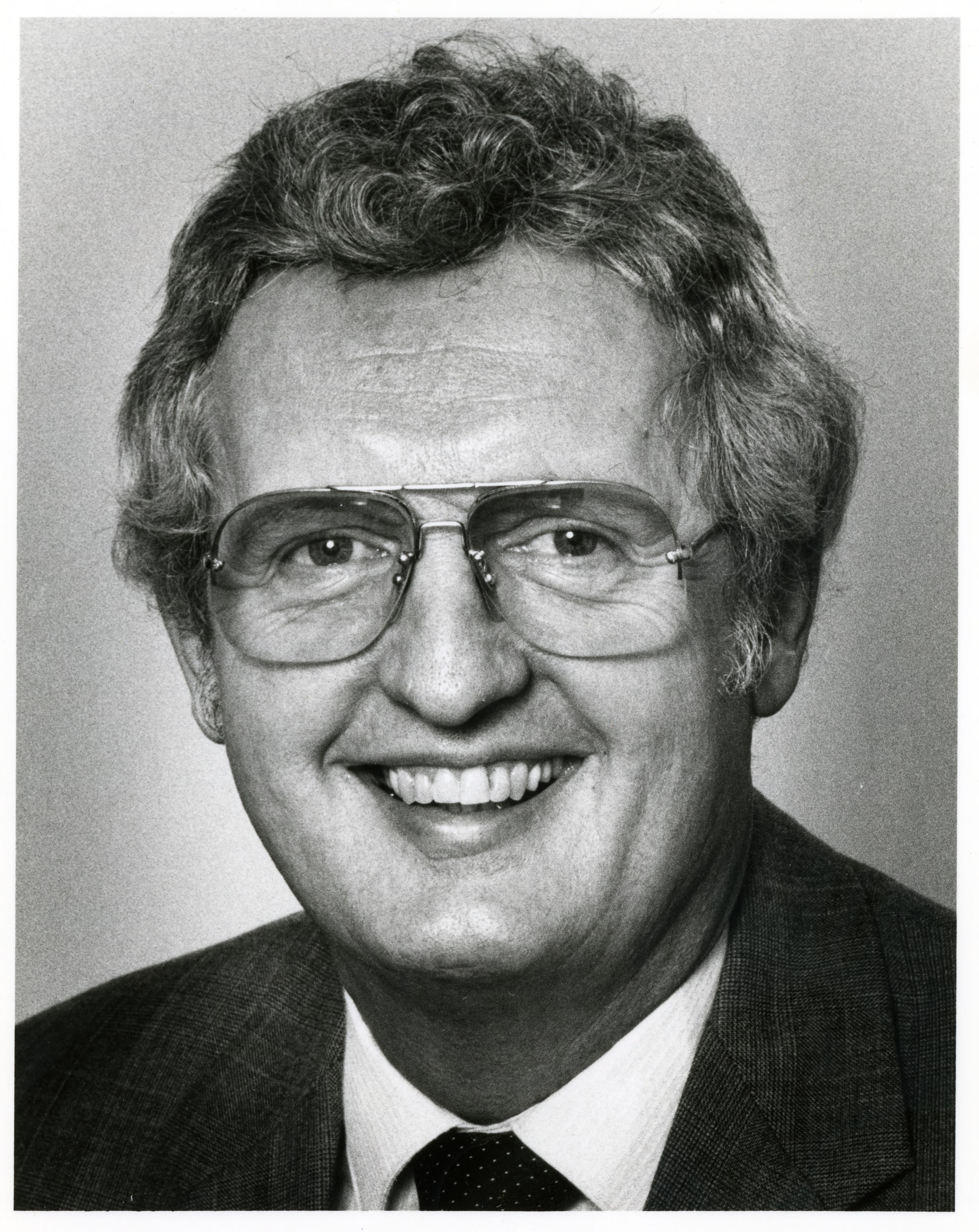

Member of the Minnesota Senate from the 12th District
- In office January 2, 1983 – January 6, 1991
- Governor: Rudy Perpich

Personal details
- Born: May 1, 1934 Minneapolis, Minnesota, U.S.
- Died: August 12, 2022 (aged 88) Baxter, Minnesota, U.S.
- Resting place: Hillside Cemetery; Minneapolis, Minnesota, U.S.
- Other political affiliations: Republican
- Spouse: Violet Nehrman
- Children: 3, including Mark Anderson
- Education: Augsburg College (B.A.); University of Minnesota (A.A.)

Donald Arthur Anderson (May 1, 1934 – August 12, 2022) was an American politician and businessman.

Anderson was born in Minneapolis, Minnesota, on May 1, 1934. He attended Edison High School in Minneapolis. Anderson lived in Wadena, Minnesota with his wife Violet and his family. One of his children, Mark, also served in the Minnesota Legislature.

He served in the United States Army and was deployed to Germany. Anderson graduated from University of Minnesota with an AA degree and from Augsburg University with a BA degree in business and history. Anderson owned a Red Owl grocery store from 1965 to 1987. He served three terms in the Minnesota Senate from 1983 to 1990 as a Republican. Anderson died at Northern Lakes Assisted Living in Baxter, Minnesota, on August 12, 2022, at the age of 88.
