= Augusta Savage =

American sculptor and teacher (1892–1962)

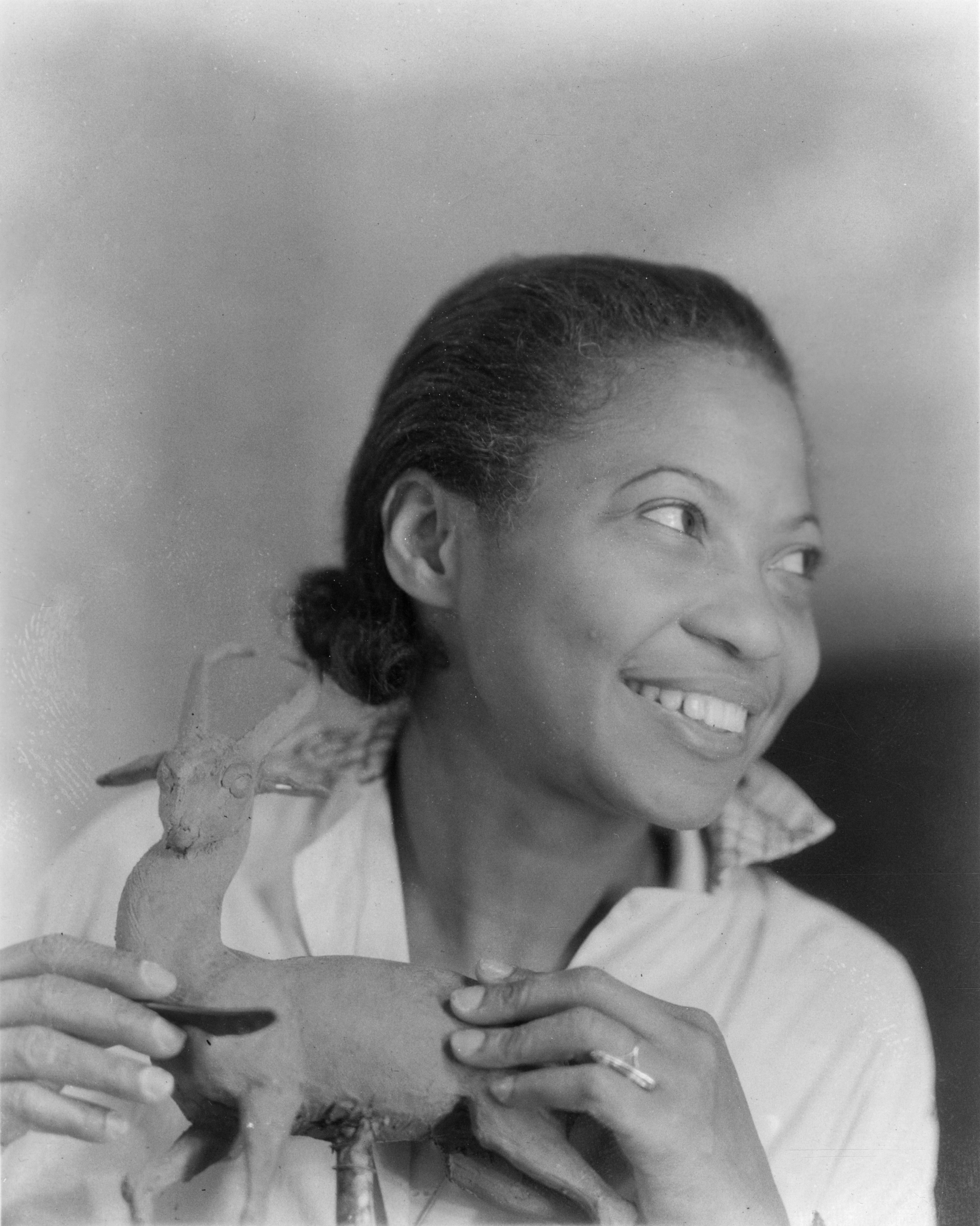
- Savage sometime between 1935–1947
- Born: Augusta Christine Fells; February 29, 1892; Green Cove Springs, Florida
- Died: March 27, 1962 (aged 70); New York
- Education: Hermon Atkins MacNeil; Charles Despiau
- Known for: Sculpture
- Notable work: Gamin; W.E.B Dubois; Lift Every Voice and Sing
- Movement: Harlem Renaissance
- Spouses: John T. Moore; James Savage; Robert L. Poston
- Patrons: Teachers from Florida A&M, Julius Rosenwald Fund

Augusta Savage (born Augusta Christine Fells; February 29, 1892 – March 27, 1962) was an American sculptor associated with the Harlem Renaissance. She was also a teacher whose studio was important to the careers of a generation of artists who would become nationally known. She worked for equal rights for African Americans in the arts.

== Early life ==
Augusta Christine Fells was born in Jacksonville, Florida, on February 29, 1892, to Edward Fells and Cornelia Murphy. Augusta began making figures as a child, mostly small animals out of the natural red clay of her hometown. Her father was a poor Methodist minister who strongly opposed his daughter's early interest in art. "My father kicked me four or five times a week," Savage once recalled, "and almost whipped all the art out of me." This was because he believed her sculpture to be a sinful practice, due to his interpretation of the "graven images" portion of the Bible. She persevered, and the principal of her new high school in West Palm Beach, where her family relocated in 1915, encouraged her talent and allowed her to teach a clay modeling class. This began a lifelong commitment to teaching, as well as to creating art.

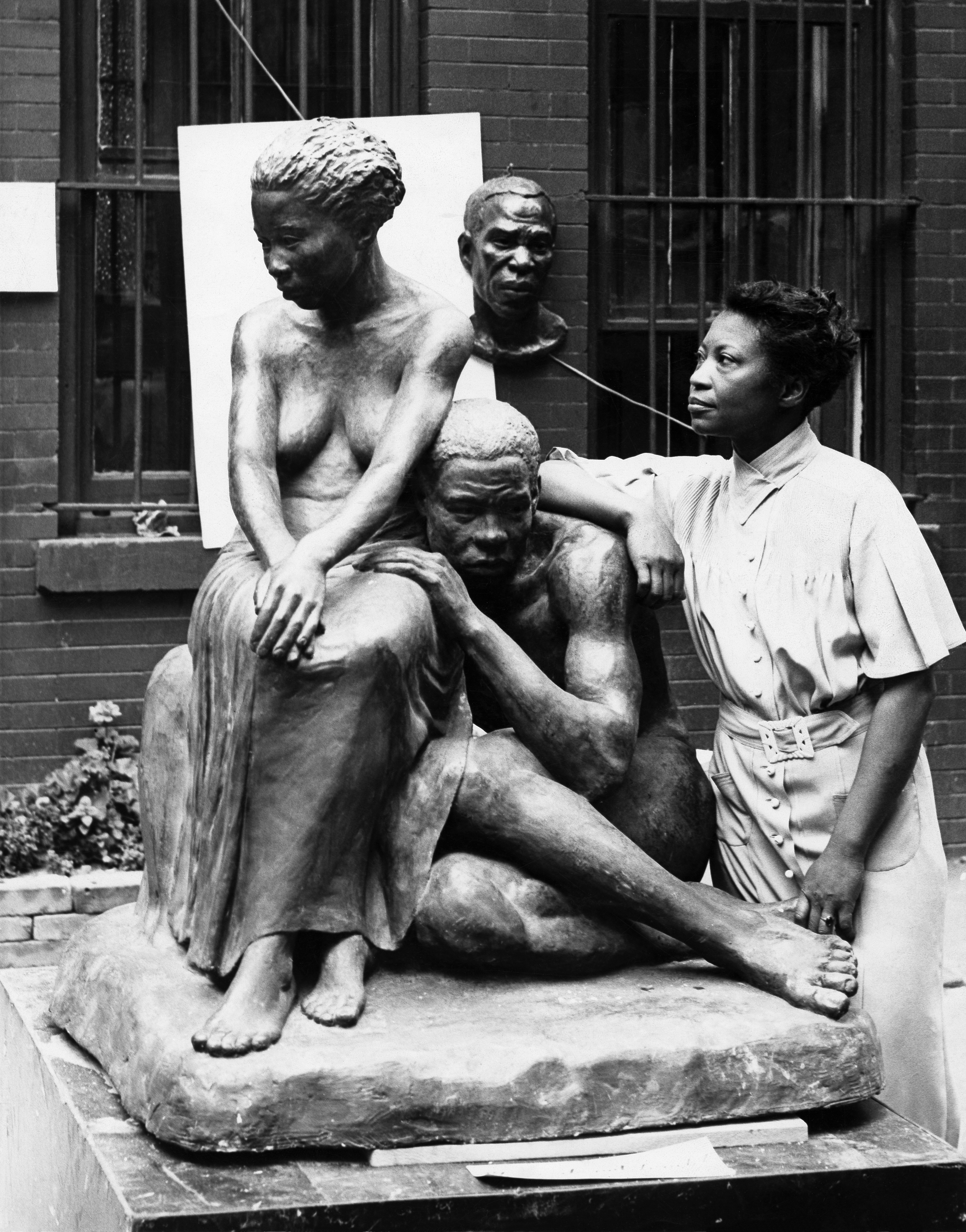
Augusta Savage with her sculpture Realization, 1938

== Personal life ==
In 1907, at the age of 15, Augusta Fells married John T. Moore; the two had a daughter, Irene Connie Moore, who was born the following year. John died shortly thereafter. In 1915, after moving to West Palm Beach, she met and married James Savage; she retained the name Savage throughout her life, even after the two divorced in the early 1920s. In 1923, Savage married Robert Lincoln Poston, a protégé of Marcus Garvey. Poston died of pneumonia aboard a ship while returning from Liberia as part of a Universal Negro Improvement Association and African Communities League delegation in 1924.

== Education and early career ==
Savage continued to model clay, and in 1919 was granted a booth at the Palm Beach County Fair where she was awarded a $25 prize and ribbon for most original exhibit. Following this success, she sought commissions for work in Jacksonville, Florida, before departing for New York City in 1921. She arrived with a letter of recommendation from the county fair official George Graham Currie for sculptor Solon Borglum and $4.60. When Borglum discovered that she could not afford tuition at the School of American Sculpture, he encouraged her to apply to Cooper Union, a scholarship-based school, in New York City where she was admitted in October 1921. She was selected before 142 other men on the waiting list. Her talent and ability impressed the Cooper Union Advisory Council and she was awarded additional funds for room and board after losing the financial support of her job as an apartment caretaker. From 1921 through 1923, she studied under sculptor George Brewster. She completed the four-year degree course in three years.

After completing studies at Cooper Union, Savage worked in Manhattan steam laundries to support herself and her family. Her father had been paralyzed by a stroke, and the family's home destroyed by a hurricane. Her family from Florida moved into her small West 137th Street apartment. During this time, she obtained her first commission from the New York Public Library on West 135th Street, a bust of W. E. B. Du Bois. Her outstanding sculpture brought more commissions, including one for a bust of Marcus Garvey. Her bust of William Pickens Sr., a key figure in the NAACP, earned praise for depicting an African American in a more humane, neutral way as opposed to stereotypes of the time, as did many of her works.

In the spring of 1923, Savage applied for a summer art program at the Fontainebleau School of Fine Arts in France. She was accepted, but when the American selection committee found out she was Black they rescinded the acceptance offer. Savage was deeply upset and questioned the committee, beginning the first of many public fights for equal rights in her life by writing a letter to the New York World. Though appeals were made to the French government to reinstate the award, they had no effect and Savage was unable to study at the school. The incident got press coverage on both sides of the Atlantic, and eventually, the sole supportive committee member sculptor Hermon Atkins MacNeil – who at one time had shared a studio with African-American artist Henry Ossawa Tanner – invited her to study with him. She later cited him as one of her teachers.

In 1923, Savage married Robert Lincoln Poston, a protégé of Garvey. Poston died of pneumonia aboard a ship while returning from Liberia as part of a Universal Negro Improvement Association and African Communities League delegation in 1924. In 1925, Savage won a scholarship with the help of W.E.B DuBois to the Royal Academy of Fine Arts in Rome. This scholarship only covered tuition, and after being unable to raise money for travel and living expenses, she was unable to attend. In the 1920s, writer and eccentric Joe Gould became infatuated with Savage. He wrote her "endless letters", telephoned her constantly, and wanted to marry her. Eventually, this infatuation turned into harassment.

Savage won the Otto Kahn Prize in a 1928 exhibition at the William E. Harmon Foundation with her submission Head of a Negro. Yet, she was an outspoken critic of the fetishization of the "negro primitive" aesthetic favored by white patrons at the time. She publicly critiqued the director of The Harmon Foundation, Mary Beattie Brady, for her low standards for Black art and lack of understanding in the area of visual arts in general.

In 1929, with the help of pooled resources from the Urban League, Rosenwald Foundation, a Carnegie Foundation grant, and donations from friends and former teachers, Savage was able to travel to France, at age 37. With assistance from the Rosenwald Fund, Savage enrolled at the Académie de la Grande Chaumière, a leading Paris art school. Savage settled into an apartment in Montparnasse and worked in the studio of [Félix] Benneteau[-Desgrois], a professor at the school. While the studio was initially encouraging of her work, Savage later wrote that "the masters are not in sympathy as they all have their own definite ideas and usually wish their pupils to follow their particular method" and began primarily working on her own in 1930. In Paris, she also studied with the sculptor Charles Despiau. She exhibited, and twice won awards, at the Paris Salon and at one Exposition. She toured France, Belgium, and Germany, researching sculpture in cathedrals and museums.

== Later career and teaching ==
Savage returned to the United States in 1931, energized from her studies and achievements. The Great Depression had almost stopped art sales. She pushed on, and in 1934 became the first African-American artist to be elected to the National Association of Women Painters and Sculptors. She launched the Savage Studio of Arts and Crafts, located in a basement on West 143rd Street in Harlem, with the help of a grant from the Carnegie Foundation. She opened her studio to anyone who wanted to paint, draw, or sculpt. Her many young students included the future nationally known artists of Jacob Lawrence, Norman Lewis, and Gwendolyn Knight. Another student was the sociologist Kenneth B. Clark, whose later research contributed to the 1954 Supreme Court decision in Brown v. Board of Education that ruled school segregation unconstitutional. In 1937, Savage became the director of the Harlem Community Art Center; 1,500 people of all ages and abilities participated in her workshops, learning from her multi-cultural staff, and showing work around New York City. Funds from the Works Progress Administration helped, but old struggles of discrimination were revived between Savage and WPA officials who objected to her having a leadership role.

Savage was one of four women and only two African Americans to receive a professional commission from the Board of Design to be included in the 1939 New York World's Fair. Savage was commissioned to create a sculpture showcasing the impact that Black people have had on music. She created Lift Every Voice and Sing (also known as "The Harp"), inspired by the song by James Weldon and Rosamond Johnson. The 16-foot-tall plaster sculpture stood in front of the Contemporary Arts Building and was one of the most popular and most photographed works at the fair; small metal souvenir copies were sold, and many postcards of the piece were purchased. The work reinterpreted the musical instrument by featuring 12 singing African-American youth in graduated heights as its strings, with the harp's sounding board transformed into an arm and a hand. In the front, a kneeling young man offered music in his hands. Savage did not have funds to have the piece cast in bronze or to move and store it, and so like other temporary installations, the sculpture was destroyed at the close of the fair.

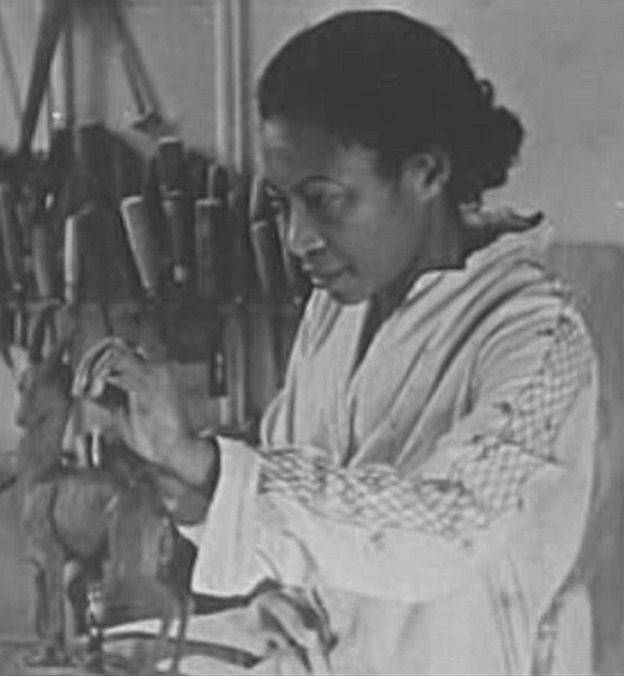
Augusta Savage working on a sculpture

Savage opened two galleries whose shows were well attended and well reviewed, but few sales resulted and the galleries closed. The last major showing of her work occurred in 1939. Deeply depressed by her financial struggle, Savage moved to a farmhouse in Saugerties, New York, in 1945. While in Saugerties, she established close ties with her neighbors and welcomed family and friends from New York City to her rural home. Savage cultivated a garden and sold pigeons, chickens, and eggs. The K-B Products Corporation, the world's largest growers of mushrooms at that time, employed Savage as a laboratory assistant in the company's cancer research facility. She acquired a car and learned to drive to enable her commute. Herman K. Knaust, director of the laboratory, encouraged Savage to pursue her artistic career and provided her with art supplies. Though her art production slowed down, Savage taught art to children in summer camps and sculpted friends and tourists, and explored writing children's stories. Her last commissioned work was for Knaust and was that of the American journalist and author Poultney Bigelow, whose father, John Bigelow, was U.S. Minister to France during the Civil War. Her few neighbors said that she was always making something with her hands.

Much of her work is in clay or plaster, as she could not often afford bronze. One of her most famous busts is titled Gamin which is on permanent display at the Smithsonian American Art Museum in Washington, D.C.; a life-sized version is in the collection of the Cleveland Museum of Art. At the time of its creation, Gamin, which is modeled after a Harlem youth, was voted most popular in an exhibition of over 200 works by black artists. Her style can be described as realistic, expressive, and sensitive. Though her art and influence within the art community are documented, the location of much of her work is unknown.

Savage moved in with her daughter, Irene, in New York City when her health started to decline, she later died of cancer on March 26, 1962. While she died in relative obscurity, Savage is remembered today as an artist, activist, arts educator and inspiration to many.

== Stalking by Joe Gould ==
In 1923, at a poetry reading in Harlem, Savage met the Greenwich Village writer Joe Gould. Gould claimed to be working on the longest book ever written, The Oral History of Our Time. He became obsessed with Savage, writing to her constantly, and proposing marriage. This obsession, which seems to have been violent, and may have involved rape, lasted for more than two decades. During those years, Gould was arrested several times for attacking women. He was in and out of psychiatric hospitals, where he was eventually diagnosed as psychopathic. In 1942, when the New Yorker writer Joseph Mitchell profiled Gould for the magazine, he portrayed him as a harmless eccentric. Gould died in 1957, in a psychiatric hospital, likely after having been lobotomized in 1949. In 1964, in a New Yorker essay called "Joe Gould's Secret," Mitchell revealed his conviction that The Oral History of Our Time never existed and had been, all along, a product of Gould's insanity. After the article was published, the writer Millen Brand, a friend of Savage's, wrote to Mitchell to tell him that he was wrong, that the Oral History did exist, reporting that "Joe [Gould] showed me long sections of the Oral History that were actually oral history ... the longest stretch of it, running through several composition books and much the longest thing probably that he ever wrote, was his account of Augusta Savage." Brand told Mitchell that Savage had been terrified of Gould but, as a Black woman, was unable to get help from the police. Mitchell never reported any of this, but New Yorker writer Jill Lepore, drawing from evidence in the Millen Brand Papers at Columbia and the Joseph Mitchell papers, then newly deposited at the New York Public Library, told the story in a 2016 book called Joe Gould's Teeth in which she speculated that Savage left New York in 1945 to escape Gould.

== Works ==
- Portrait busts of W.E.B. DuBois and Marcus Garvey
- Gamin
- The Tom Tom
- The Abstract Madonna
- "The Diving Boy" currently on display at Cummer Museum Jacksonville, FL
- Envy
- A Woman of Martinique
- Lift Every Voice and Sing (also known as The Harp)
- Sculptural interpretation of Negro Music
- Gwendolyn Knight, 1934–35

== Individual exhibitions ==
- Grande Chaumière, Paris, 1929
- Salon d'Automne, Paris, 1930
- Argent Galleries, New York and Art Anderson Gallery, New York, 1932
- Argent Galleries, New York and New York World's Fair, 1939
- New York Public Library, 1988

== Selected group exhibitions ==
- Argent Galleries, New York, 1934
- Argent Galleries, New York, 1938
- American Negro Exposition, Tanner Art Galleries, Chicago, 1940
- Newark Museum, New Jersey, 1990
- Three Generations of African-American Women Sculptors, Afro-American Historical and Cultural Museum, Philadelphia, 1996
- The Harlem Renaissance and Transatlantic Modernism, Metropolitan Museum of Art, New York, 2024

== Legacy ==
- Augusta Fells Savage Institute of Visual Arts in Baltimore is named after her.
- She is the namesake of the Augusta Savage Gallery at the University of Massachusetts Amherst.
- Namesake of the Augusta Savage Friendship Park, Green Cove Springs FL
- Namesake of the Augusta Savage Arts and Cultural Center, Green Cove Springs FL
