= Lift Every Voice and Sing (sculpture) =

1939 sculpture by Augusta Savage

Lift Every Voice and Sing at the New York World's Fair

Lift Every Voice and Sing, also known as The Harp, was a plaster sculpture by African-American artist Augusta Savage. It was commissioned for the 1939 New York World's Fair, and displayed in the courtyard of the Pavilion of Contemporary Art during the fair at Flushing Meadow. The sculpture was destroyed along with other temporary artworks at the site after the closing of the exhibition in 1940.

== Background ==
Augusta Fells was born in 1892 on February 29 in Green Cove Springs, Florida, about 40 miles south of Jacksonville, Florida. She married John T. Moore in 1907, at the age of 15, and had her only child the following year, a daughter Irene. After Moore's death, she married James Savage in 1915. She divorced her second husband in 1920 but retained his surname for the rest of her life. She moved to study in New York in 1921, with a letter of introduction to Solon Borglum. She could not afford the fees at his American School of Sculpture and instead studied at Cooper Union, completing a four-year degree in three years due to her experience. She married her third husband Robert Lincoln Poston in 1923, but he died the following year on his return journey after leading a delegation to Liberia.

Also in 1923, Savage won a full scholarship to attend the inaugural artistic summer school at Fontainebleau, in France near Paris, but the scholarship was withdrawn by the selection committee on account of her color – reportedly because white American students from Georgia would not share rooms with an African-American. W. E. B. Du Bois wrote letters supporting her application, and the rejection was reported in a number of newspapers. One member of the selection committee, the sculptor Hermon A. MacNeil, disagreed with the withdrawal of the scholarship and offered Savage the opportunity to study with him instead. She continued to work in the US, and eventually gathered sufficient funding to study in France at the Académie de la Grande Chaumière from 1929, exhibiting at the Salon d'Automne in 1930, and at the Salon de Printemps and the Paris Colonial Exposition in 1931.

She returned to the US to open the Savage Studio of Arts and Crafts in New York City in 1932, with a grant from the Carnegie Foundation. In 1934, she was the first African-American to be elected to the National Association of Women Artists, and in 1937, she was appointed as the first director of the Harlem Community Art Center.

Also in 1937, she was the only African-American woman commissioned by the Board of Design to create a sculpture for the 1939 World's Fair. One male African-American composer was also commissioned, William Grant Still, who composed a piece of music that played on a continuous loop in the Perisphere exhibit, called "Democracity" which imagined a modern city of tomorrow. He was not allowed to enter his own exhibit with the other guests when it opened. At least four other women were commissioned as well, including Elfriede Abbe, Malvina Hoffman, Brenda Putnam and Gertrude Vanderbilt Whitney. Savage was one of 14 women awarded a silver medal by the Women's Service League of Brooklyn for their artistic contribution to the fair.

Savage took leave of absence from the Harlem Community Art Center to focus on the sculpture, but when she returned she found her job had been taken by another person, Gwendolyn Bennett. Savage exhibited at the American Negro Exposition in 1940, and founded two commercial galleries which failed. Her sculpture for the World's Fair was her last major work. She moved to Saugerties, New York, in 1945, where she became an art teacher and farmer. She died in New York City in 1962.

== Description ==
Savage was asked to make a sculpture to symbolize African-American music for the 1939 World's Fair. The sculpture was inspired by the poem "Lift Every Voice and Sing" written in 1900 by James Weldon Johnson, who died the year before in 1938. Set to music as a hymn in 1905 by his brother John Rosamond Johnson, it became known as the "Negro national anthem". A photograph of a preliminary sketch appeared on the cover of the NAACP magazine The Crisis in April 1939.

The resulting sculpture was 16 ft (4.9 m) high, taking the form of a large harp, with the strings represented by twelve black singers of decreasing size standing in long robes, supported by a long arm and hand representing the arm of god as the sounding board of the instrument – perhaps alluding to the traditional Spiritual "He's Got the Whole World in His Hands". In front of the harp, the figure of a bare-chested black man was kneeling, holding sheet music for the song. The plaster was given a dark surface treatment, and finished like basalt.

Savage named the sculpture Lift Every Voice and Sing after the poem and hymn, but the fair's organizing committee renamed it The Harp. Exhibited outside the redwood-clad Pavilion of Contemporary Art, it became very popular at the fair, and many postcards and 11 in (28 cm) metal replicas were sold as souvenirs. There was no funding available to remove and store the plaster sculpture at the end of the fair, or to cast the large piece in bronze as Savage had with other smaller works. The sculpture was destroyed along with other temporary works when the exhibition closed after its second season in 1940.

== Replicas ==
Examples of the metal replicas are held in several museums, including the Schomburg Center in Harlem, and the Columbus Museum in Georgia. A gold plated example was sold at Bonham's in Los Angeles in 2018 for US$9,375 (including buyer's premium). A silver example was sold at Swann Galleries in 2019 for $21,250.

In 2017, Aviva Kempner suggested in the New York Times that a full-size replica should be erected in front of the National Museum of African American History and Culture in Washington, D.C., and in 2021 it was announced that a copy of the statue will be installed in the new Lift Ev’ry Voice and Sing Park to be created at 120 Lee Street, in Jacksonville, Florida, where James Weldon Johnson and J. Rosamond Johnson were born, and about 40 mi (64 km) north of Savage's birthplace.

A photograph of a replica of the sculpture was chosen for the cover of the 2021 work Women's International Thought: Towards a New Canon.
