= Mark Anderson (Minnesota politician) =

American politician

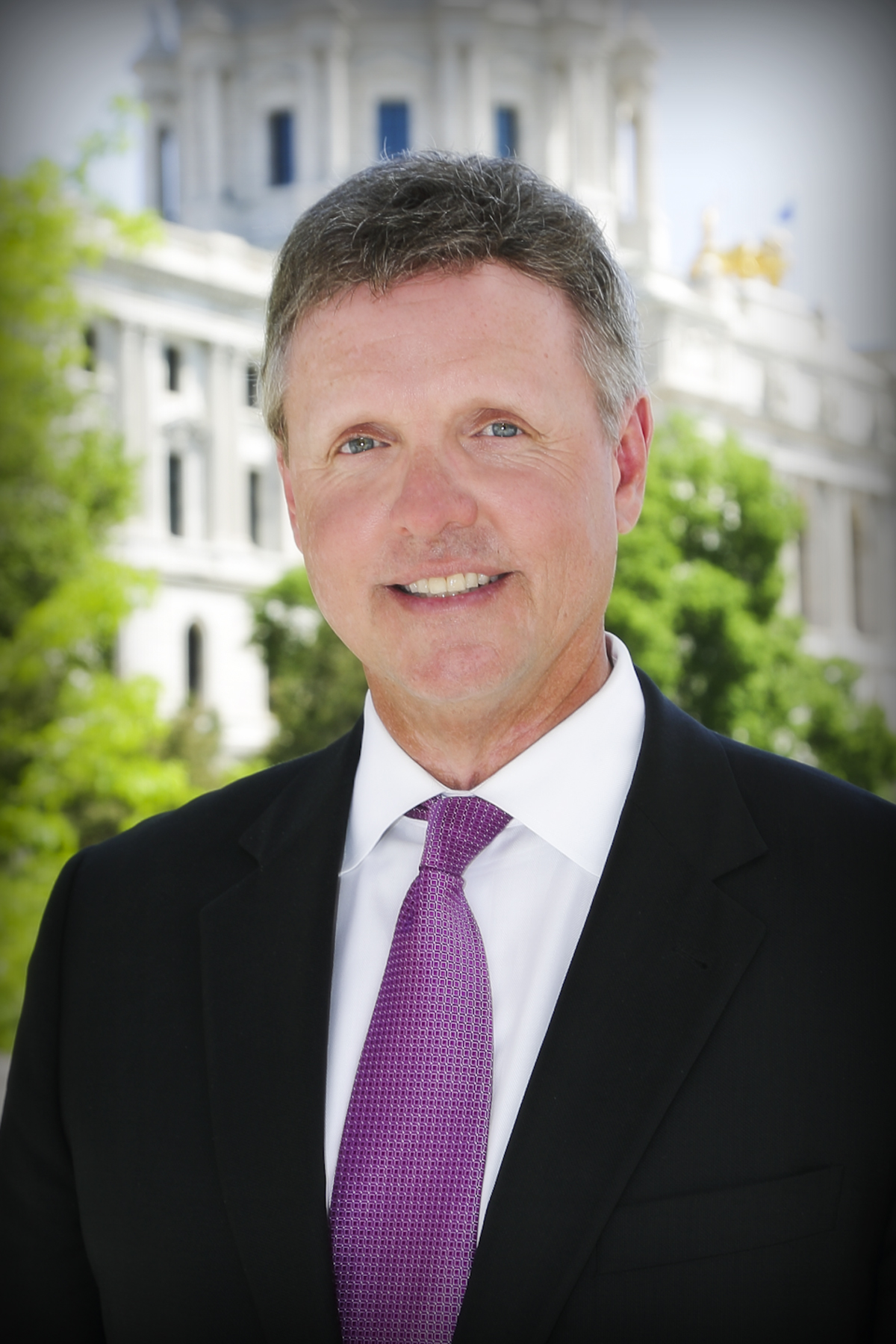
- Representative Mark Anderson, 2014

Member of the Minnesota House of Representatives from the 9A district
- In office January 8, 2013 – January 2, 2017
- Preceded by: redrawn district
- Succeeded by: John Poston

Personal details
- Born: April 16, 1958 (age 68) Minneapolis, Minnesota
- Party: Republican Party of Minnesota
- Spouse: Barb
- Children: 4
- Relatives: Don A. Anderson & Violet Anderson (father & mother)
- Education: University of North Dakota (B.S.)
- Occupation: Airline Pilot, Businessman

Mark T. Anderson (born April 16, 1958) is a Minnesota politician and retired member of the Minnesota House of Representatives. A conservative member of the Republican Party of Minnesota, he represented District 9A in north-central Minnesota, which included portions of Wadena, Todd, and Cass counties.

== Education ==
Anderson graduated from Wadena High School. He attended the University of North Dakota, graduating with a B.S. degree in Airway Science - Aircraft Systems Management.

== Early Political Involvement ==
1980 Anderson was a Minnesota Youth Delegate at the Republican National Convention in Detroit, Michigan, witnessing Ronald Reagan's endorsement as the GOP Presidential Nominee. 1980, 1982 and 1986 Anderson was a volunteer for the Don Anderson State Senate campaigns. 1994 Anderson was a volunteer for the Pat McGowan For Hennepin County Sheriff committee.

== Minnesota House of Representatives (2013-2017) ==
Anderson was first elected (58%) to the Minnesota House of Representatives on November 6, 2012 and reelected (64%) on November 4, 2014.

Anderson's 2013-2014 committee appointments: Civil Law, Education Policy, Transportation Policy.

Legislation introduced by Anderson as chief author during the Minnesota 88th Legislative Session (DFL control of the House):

- HF1495. a bill to regulate verdict, award and judgment interest.
- HF2330. a bonding bill for Staples Central Lake College for campus rightsizing and renovation.
- HF2362. a bill modifying shotgun use areas for deer hunting.
- HF2363. a bill granting and appropriating "Support Our Troops" funds to Eagle's Healing Nest. (Reassigned to Representative Paul Anderson.)
- HF2592. a bill clarifying authorization for brewery growler refills.
- HF3161. a bill authorizing Wadena County to sell tax-forfeited land that borders public waters.

Anderson's 2015-2016 committee appointments: Agriculture Policy, Agriculture Finance, Mining & Outdoor Recreation Policy, State Government Finance, Transportation Policy & Finance.

Legislation introduced by Anderson as chief author during the Minnesota 89th Legislative Session (GOP control of the House):

- HF594. a bill dedicating aviation tax on gasoline revenues as a substitute for aviation gasoline to the state airports fund.
- HF1028. a bill exempting military retirement pay from Minnesota taxation.
- HF1030. a bill abolishing employer withholding state income taxes on wages, and establishing monthly payment of employee state income taxes on wages.
- HF1032. a bill abolishing malt liquor 3.2 percent classification.
- HF1371. a bill dedicating 40% of State Lottery net proceeds for local roads and bridges.
- HF1434. a bill to repeal the Minnesota prohibition of firearm suppressor possession. The bill was first introduced on March 4, 2015. It passed the House Public Safety and Crime Prevention Policy and Finance Committee on March 12, 2015. It passed (89-40) in the Minnesota House of Representative on April 16, 2015. The bill was attached to the Senate Conference Committee bill (SF878.), repassed (116-15) as amended by the Minnesota House on May 17, 2015. The Governor signed the bill into law on May 22, 2015. The statute allowing legal suppressor possession in Minnesota took effect on July 1, 2015.
- HF1448. a bill requiring DNR sale of donated land with proceeds dedicated to trunk highway fund.
- HF2027. a bill authorizing Cass County to sell tax-forfeited land.
- HF2092. a bill making changes to public assistance programs: limiting the use of electronic benefit transfer cards, prohibiting purchase of foods with limited nutritional value; modifying Minnesota residency requirements to 90 days; establishing asset standards for public assistance programs; establishing a family cap for MFIP; requiring mandatory testing for controlled substances for applicants, recipients of general assistance and MFIP.
- HF2256. a bill repealing Minnesota individual income and corporate franchise taxes.
- HF2257. a bill repealing Minnesota sales and use taxes.
- HF2258. a bill amending the Minnesota Constitution, establishing State Legislator term limits.
- HF2259. a bill limiting total state fiscal year spending to 5% of personal income.
- HF2466. a bill repealing MNsure and Minnesota Rules governing MNsure.
- HF2468. a bill providing a general fund grant to Eagle's Healing Nest.
- HF2479. a bill regulating Minnesota business license fees, establishing a $100 maximum annual fee.
- HF2481. a bill establishing a dedicated general assistance fund; establishing a Minnesota income tax form contribution checkoff; modifying and limiting general assistance funding to proceeds collected only from Minnesota income tax form contributions.
- HF2482. a bill expanding malt liquor packaging for off-sale by a brew pub or small breweries.
- HF2483. a bill assessing civil and criminal penalties for employers of illegal immigrants; first offense $10,000 per infraction, second offense $50,000 per infraction (a gross misdemeanor).
- HF2484. a bill modifying punishments for traffic regulation convictions; replacing petty misdemeanor fines up to $300 with community service or driver's license suspension.
- HF2485. a bill prohibiting registration or licensure of unmanned aircraft systems by state government agencies.
- HF2488. a bill repealing Minnesota state and local property taxes.
- HF2489. a bill prohibiting civil court judges from applying foreign law in certain cases.
- HF3078. a bill authorizing Cass County conveyance of tax-forfeited land.
- HF3160. a bill modifying night vision possession restrictions; authorizing ammunition manufacturers night vision possession for field testing ammunition.
- HF3207. a bill prohibiting the Minnesota Department of Natural Resources from Muskellunge introduction or stocking in waters not previously stocked. (Big Marine in Washington County, the Fairmont Chain of Lakes in Martin County, The Gull Chain of Lakes in Cass County and one lake in Otter Tail County (Frankline, Lizzie or Loon Lake).

February 15, 2016, Anderson announced he would not seek a third term in the Minnesota House of Representatives. His term expired on January 2, 2017.

== Personal life ==
Anderson is married to his wife, Barb. They have four children. Anderson currently resides in Fort Myers, Florida.

He is a retired airline pilot (B757-B767), though he continues to fly business jets as a contract pilot, which he has done professionally since 1993. He has been a FAA Certified Flight Instructor (CFI-MEII) since 1988.

Anderson is also an entrepreneur and businessman having founded Channel Inn & Granny's Pub (1982-1983), MTA Enterprises LLC (1993-present), Gull Dam Brewing (2012-2018) and a partner in the group which founded Twin Cities Summer Jam (2018-2023).

Anderson is a National Aeronautics Association (NAA) aviation record holder (listed in the book 2003 U.S. And World Aviation & Space Records), for setting the fastest time to fly around the border of the continental U.S. (1 day, 21 hours, 27 minutes). He also received a Recognition Award - NAA's Most Memorable Record - by setting this record on December 17, 2003, overflying Kitty Hawk, NC within the exact hour of the 100th anniversary of the Wright Brother's historical flight.

Anderson holds a black belt in Karate, achieved under martial arts training supervision of USA Karate's Grand Masters Gordon Franks and Pat Worley as well as Masters Allan Kunstmann and Rob Nelson.

Anderson is the son of the late former Minnesota State Senator Don A. Anderson (and Violet Anderson) who served 1983-1990.
