= Ersa Poston =

American anti-poverty activist

Ersa Poston

Ersa Hines Poston (née Ersa Elizabeth Hines; March 3, 1921 — January 7, 2009) was an American anti-poverty activist and civil service reformer. She was the first African American woman appointed to the Civil Service Commission. She then became vice chairman of the Merit Systems Protection Board. She also went by the name Ersa Hines Clinton. She was a member of Alpha Kappa Alpha sorority.

== Early life and education ==
Ersa Elizabeth Hines was born May 3, 1921, in Mayfield, Kentucky, to Vivian Johnson Hines and Sherman Hines. She stated that she was named after a distant relative who was named Ursa, for the constellation, but her mother thought the name looked better spelled as Ersa. She had African American and Cherokee ancestry, and her mother was Cherokee.

When Poston was four, her mother died of tuberculosis, and she and her father moved to Paducah, Kentucky, where her paternal grandparents lived. During the Great Depression, her grandfather kept his job as a railroad switchman, and her grandmother began a soup kitchen from their house for other families who were less fortunate. White and Black families attended, leading Poston to later say that Paducah had less racial discrimination during that period than later on. Poston was primarily raised by her grandmother, and she later emphasized that education and accomplishment were strong values for her family.

Poston graduated from Kentucky State University in 1942. In 1946 she earned a master's degree in social work from Atlanta University. She was a member of Alpha Kappa Alpha. She had initially wanted to study medicine, but was inspired to pursue social work after seeing widespread hunger and poverty during the Great Depression.

== Career ==
Poston began her career with the Tuberculosis and Health Association in Hartford, Connecticut. She moved to New York in 1950 to become the director of the Clinton Community Center in Manhattan. In 1953, she left that job to become Field Director for the New York City Welfare and Health Council, and in 1955, she transitioned to become Assistant Director for the New York City Youth Board under the mayor's office. This began a long period of her career where she focused on youth policy and employment opportunity.

Poston was appointed to New York State's Youth Commission in 1957, and this began her work for the state government. She held two roles, working as the area director for the commission, as well as the Youth Work Progress Director for the New York State Division of Youth. In 1962, she left to work as confidential assistant to the governor of New York, Nelson A. Rockefeller, and she held this role until 1964.

Poston was Director of the New York State Office of Economic Opportunity from 1965 – 1967. She served as President of the New York State Civil Service Commission from 1967 – 1975. She was appointed to the 3-member U.S. Civil Service Commission by U.S. President Jimmy Carter in 1977. These jobs let her protect government employees from discrimination, retaliation, and unfair favoritism, promoting merit as an employment metric, which she explained as important for protecting whistle-blowers. She believed that it was good public policy to support and train government employees from underserviced backgrounds, and that building a representative work force for the government was similarly correct policy. She firmly believed that this didn't lower the quality of the work force, and believed equal opportunity was the correct and smart choice for a well-functioning government.

Her nomination for federal office received various letters of endorsement. She had long wanted to be a leader in the U.S. federal government, because "hopefully, one might have the opportunity to influence the social and public policies that shape the life and destinies of many people."

During the Nixon administration, a U.S. House subcommittee documented manipulation of the federal government's merit system. Still on the U.S. Civil Service Commission, Poston worked with its head, Alan K. Campbell, to shut down the commission for replacement with more robust ones. In 1979, the commission was replaced by three new federal agencies: the Merit Systems Protection Board, which Poston immediately became vice chairman for, as well as the Office of Personnel Management and the Federal Labor Relations Authority. In her new role, she was one of the highest-ranking Black women during the Reagan administration, and she served until 1983. For the next few years, she consulted for the State Department for personnel management issues, until she retired.

Poston also served as a Vice President of the Urban League, and was a board member for the Whitney M. Young Memorial Foundation.

== Awards and honors ==
In 1965, she received the Distinguished Alumni Award from Kentucky State University, as well as a Kentucky Colonel Commission from the state.

In 1967, Mercy College granted her the Populus Dei Award, the Veterans of Foreign Wars gave her the Voice of Democracy Award, and the 369th Veterans Association gave her an Award for Achievement in Government. In 1969, she earned the Woman of Achievement Award from the New York Chapter of the Northeasterners.

In 1970 Poston was given the Benjamin Potoker Brotherhood Award by the New York State Employees Brotherhood Committee. In 1971, her other alma mater, Atlanta University, gave her the Distinguished Alumni Citation. The same year, the Caucus of Black Legislators of the State of New York gave Poston the Distinguished Service Award. In 1972, she earned the Achievement Award from the New York Council of the United Negro College Fund.

In 1973 she received a distinguished service award from the president of Buffalo State University. She received the Equal Opportunity Day Award from the National Urban League in 1976, and the Distinguished Public Servant Award in 1977 from the Capital Press Club. In 1978, she earned the Outstanding Achievements in Public Personnel from the National Black Personnel Association.

Poston was inducted into the New York State Woman's Hall of Fame in 1980, also earning the governor's citation that year. She received the Warren W. Stockberger Award in 1983.

== Personal life ==
She married Ted Poston of the prominent Poston family of Hopkinsville, Kentucky.

In 1977 she was photographed at the Women's Conference in Houston, Texas.

Poston died January 7, 2009, from pneumonia, at the Suburban Hospital in Washington, D.C.
