= John Poston (politician) =

American politician (1958–2023)

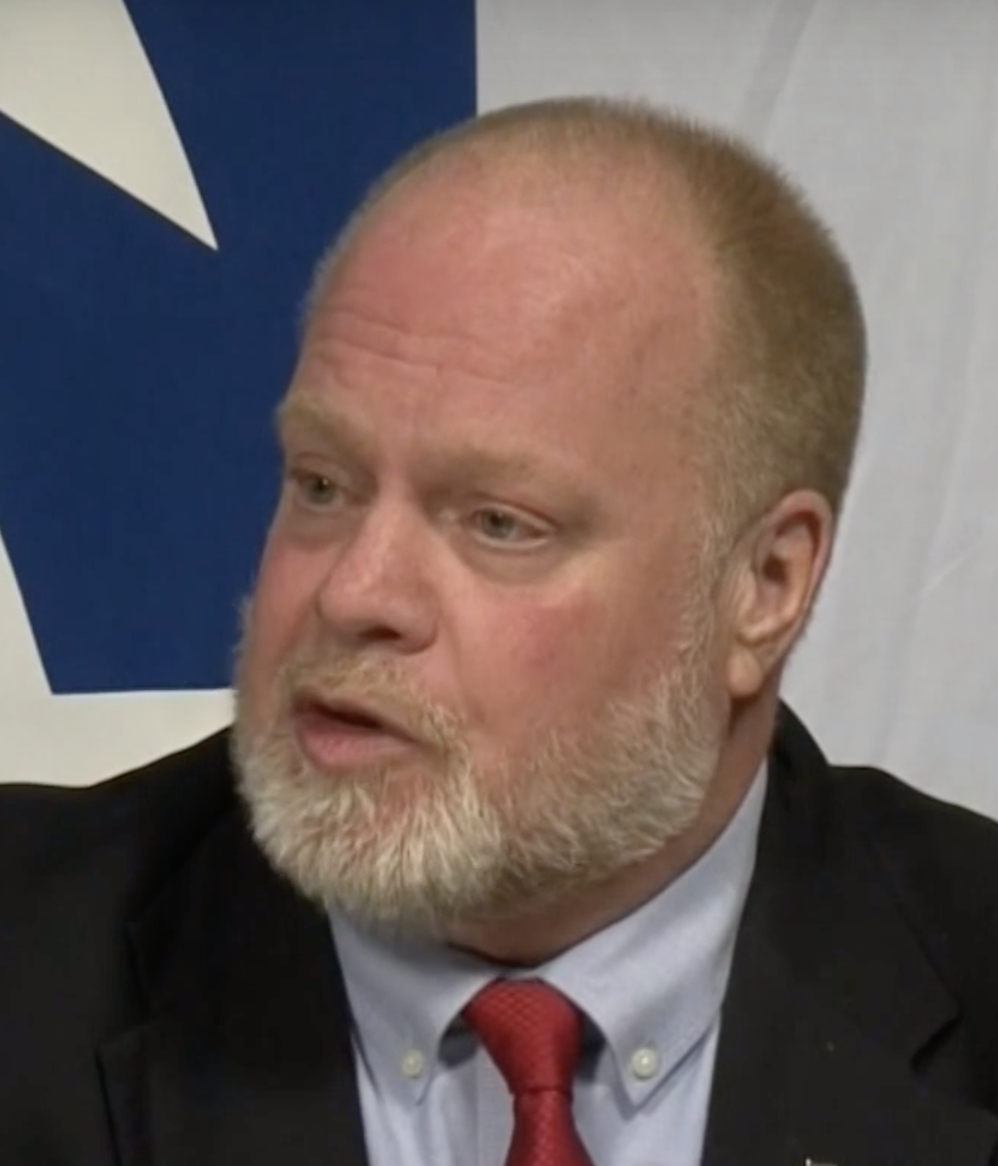

Member of the Minnesota House of Representatives from the 9A district
- In office January 3, 2017 – January 3, 2023
- Preceded by: Mark Anderson
- Succeeded by: Krista Knudsen

Personal details
- Born: May 5, 1958 Minneapolis, Minnesota, U.S.
- Died: December 5, 2023 (aged 65) Lake Shore, Minnesota
- Party: Republican
- Spouse: Pam
- Education: Des Moines Area Community College
- Occupation: small business owner

John Poston (3 May 1958 – December 5, 2023) was an American politician and member of the Minnesota House of Representatives. A member of the Republican Party of Minnesota, he represented District 9A in north-central Minnesota.

== Early life, education, and career ==
Poston was born in May 1958 in Minneapolis, Minnesota, where he was initially raised. He was later raised in Aitkin, Minnesota. He later moved to Des Moines, Iowa when his father was transferred there and graduated from high school in Earlham, Iowa. He attended Des Moines Area Community College.

Poston worked for Payless Cashways while attending college, becoming an assistant manager and later manager. He later worked for Home Depot. Finally, he worked for Sally Beauty Holdings for 20 years, becoming a retail executive. In 2011, Poston bought Sherwood Forest, a restaurant in Lake Shore, Minnesota.

Poston founded a Kids Against Hunger in the Brainerd Lakes area in 2012. He was a volunteer for Teen Challenge and Essentia Health. Poston was a member of the Nisswa Chamber of Commerce board, the Region Five Economic Development Commission, the National Joint Powers Alliance, Happy Dancing Turtle, Central Lakes Rotary, the Nisswa Lions Club.

== City Government ==
Poston was a member of the Lake Shore park committee, later becoming its chair. He was appointed a member of the Lake Shore City Council in 2011 and later elected mayor in 2014. He was later re-appointed to the position of mayor, after his successor in the position, Krista Knudsen, was elected to his Minnesota House seat. He served until his resignation due to poor health a few months later.

== Minnesota House of Representatives ==
Poston was elected to the Minnesota House of Representatives in 2016, going on to serve three terms as the Representative from District 9A.

Poston won his first election in 2016 with 68% of the vote. He was re-elected in 2018 with 69.34%, and in 2020 with 74.0%.

Poston's 2017-2018 Committee Assignments included: Agriculture Finance Agriculture Policy Capital Investment Education Finance State Government Finance: Veterans Affairs Division

Poston's 2019-2020 Committee Assignments included: Agriculture and Food Finance and Policy Division, Corrections Division, Public Safety and Criminal Justice Reform Finance and Policy Division

Poston's 2021-2022 Committee Assignments included: Education Policy Labor, Industry, Veterans and Military Affairs Finance and Policy Public Safety and Criminal Justice Reform Finance and Policy

== Personal life ==
Poston married his wife Pamela (Wachholz) in 2018, and was a stepfather to her daughter Bailey. He resided in Lake Shore, Minnesota and was a member of the Lutheran Church of the Cross in Nisswa, Minnesota.

Poston was diagnosed with ALS in September 2023 and died December 5, 2023, at the age of 65, nearly a month after his resignation as mayor.
