= Lift Every Voice and Sing =

American song

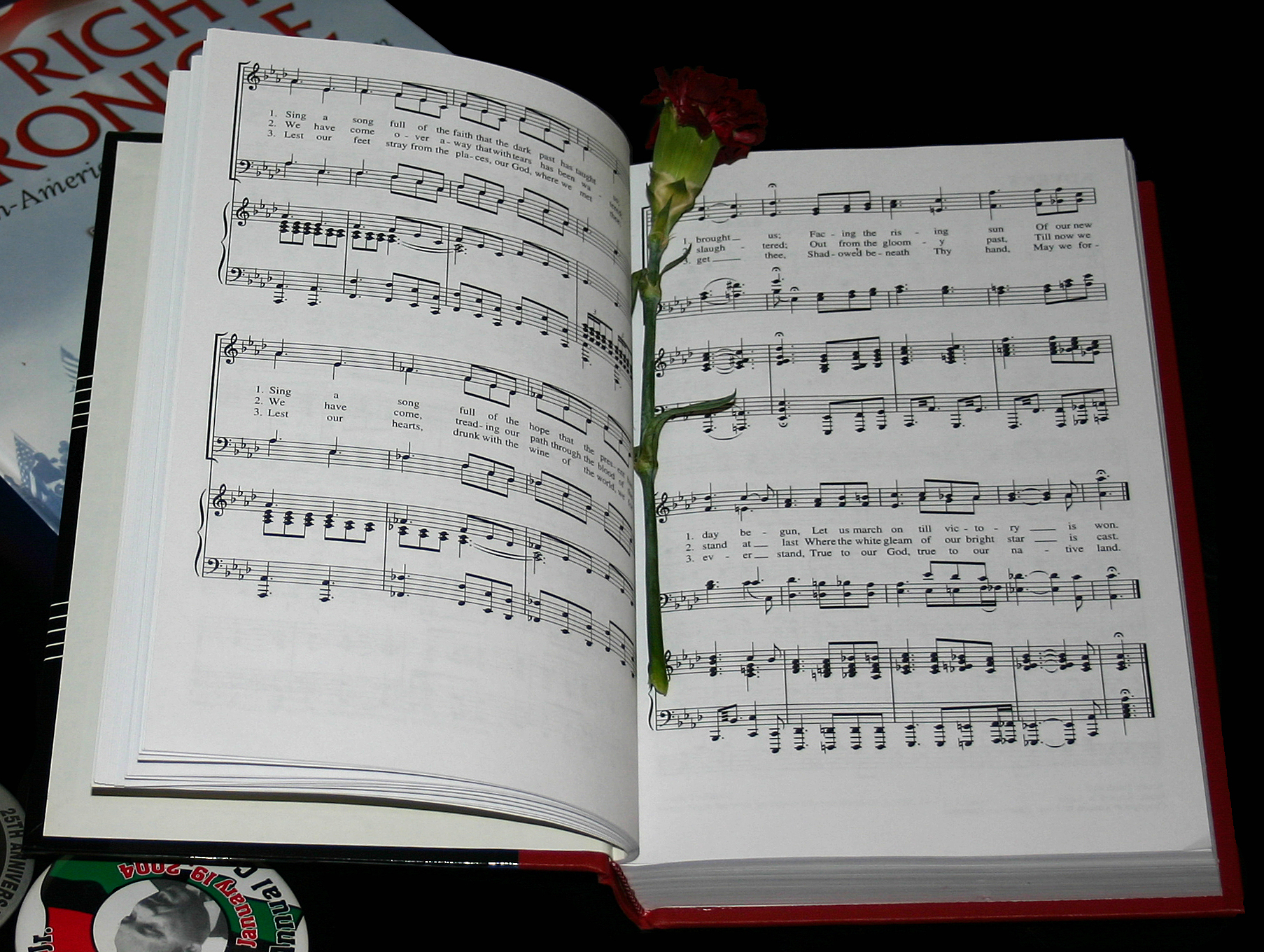
- Sheet music of "Lift Every Voice and Sing"
- Also known as: Lift Ev'ry Voice and Sing
- Lyrics: James Weldon Johnson, 1900
- Music: J. Rosamond Johnson, 1900

Audio sample
- "Lift Every Voice and Sing" performed by the United States Navy Band, 2021: file; help

"Lift Every Voice and Sing" is a hymn with lyrics by James Weldon Johnson (1871–1938) written in the late 1800s and set to music by his brother, J. Rosamond Johnson (1873–1954) in 1905. Written from the context of African Americans in the late 19th century, the hymn is a prayer of thanksgiving to God as well as a prayer for faithfulness and freedom, with imagery that evokes the biblical Exodus from slavery to the freedom of the "promised land". Premiered in 1900, "Lift Every Voice and Sing" was communally sung within Black American communities, while the NAACP began to promote the hymn as a "Negro national anthem" in 1917 (with the term "Black national anthem" similarly used in the present day). It has been featured in 54 different Christian hymnals, and it has also been performed by various African American singers and musicians.

== History ==
James Weldon Johnson graduated from Atlanta University in 1894 and returned to his hometown of Jacksonville where he became the Principal of Stanton High School, the first public high school for African Americans in the state of Florida, named in honor of Edwin M. Stanton. Johnson sought to write a poem in commemoration of President Abraham Lincoln's birthday.

However, amid the ongoing civil rights movement, Johnson decided to write a poem which was themed around the struggles of African Americans following the Reconstruction era (including the passage of Jim Crow laws in the South). "Lift Every Voice and Sing" was first recited by 500 students in 1900. His brother J. Rosamond Johnson later set the poem to music.

After the Great Fire of 1901 in Jacksonville, the Johnsons moved to New York City to pursue a career on Broadway. In the years that followed, "Lift Every Voice and Sing" was sung within Black communities; Johnson wrote that "the school children of Jacksonville kept singing it; they went off to other schools and sang it; they became teachers and taught it to other children. Within twenty years it was being sung over the South and in some other parts of the country".

== Recognition ==
A sculpture by Augusta Savage named after the song was exhibited at the 1939 New York World's Fair, taking the form of a choir of children shaped into a harp. Savage was the only Black woman commissioned for the Fair, and the sculpture (which was retitled "The Harp" by organizers) was also sold as miniature replicas and on postcards during the event. Like other temporary installations, the sculpture was destroyed at the close of the fair.

=== As the "Negro national anthem" ===
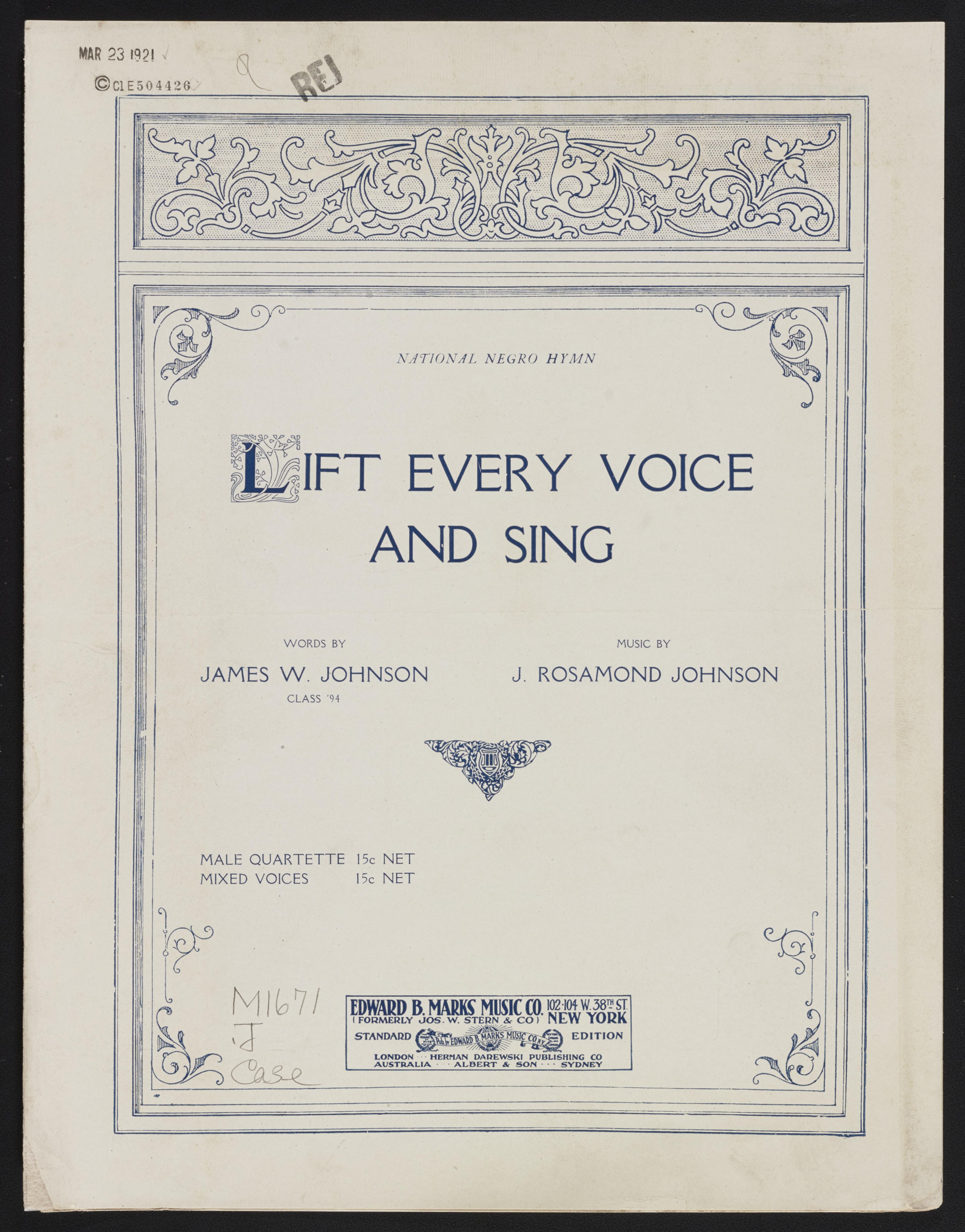
1921 sheet music for "Lift Every Voice and Sing," subtitled "National Negro Hymn"

In 1919, the National Association for the Advancement of Colored People (NAACP) dubbed "Lift Every Voice and Sing" the "Negro national anthem" for its power in voicing a cry for liberation and affirmation for African American people. James Weldon Johnson was appointed as the NAACP's first executive secretary the following year. It has similarly been referred to as "the Black national anthem".

The use of the term "the Black national anthem" in reference to "Lift Every Voice and Sing" has been criticized. Timothy Askew, an associate professor at the historically Black Clark Atlanta University, argued that the use of the term "Black national anthem" could incorrectly implicate a desire of separatism by Black communities, that the lyrics of the hymn do not overtly refer to any specific race (which has inspired people to perform it outside African American communities), and "identity should be developed by the individual himself, not by a group of people who think they know what is best for you". Some commentators have similarly criticized performances and references to "Lift Every Voice and Sing" as the "Black national anthem" as separatist and diminishing to "The Star-Spangled Banner" as the national anthem of the United States.

In response to Askew's remarks, the NAACP's then-senior vice president of advocacy and policy Hilary O. Shelton told CNN that the hymn "was adopted and welcomed by a very interracial group, and it speaks of hope in being full first-class citizens in our society", used in conjunction with the U.S. national anthem or the Pledge of Allegiance during public events, "It is evident in our actions as an organization and here in America it is evidence that we are about inclusion, not exclusion. To claim that we as African-Americans want to form a confederation or separate ourselves from white people because of one song is baffling to me."

In January 2021, Representative and then-House Majority Whip Jim Clyburn sponsored HR 301, a bill that proposed that "Lift Every Voice and Sing" be designated as the national hymn of the United States. Other songs have been proposed to become the national hymn of the United States in the past, and "The Star-Spangled Banner" would have remained the national anthem.

== Notable references and performances ==
In 1923, the male gospel group Manhattan Harmony Four recorded the hymn as "Lift Every Voice and Sing (National Negro Anthem)". It was added to the National Recording Registry in 2016.

In Maya Angelou's 1969 autobiography, I Know Why the Caged Bird Sings, the hymn is sung by the audience and students at Maya's eighth-grade graduation ceremony, after a white school official dashes the educational aspirations of her classmates.

In 1972, Kim Weston sang the hymn as the opening number for the Wattstax Festival at the Los Angeles Memorial Coliseum. This performance was included in the film Wattstax which was produced by Wolper Films. The musical direction and recording were both overseen by Stax Records engineer Terry Manning.

In 1975, James Brown quoted a lyric from the hymn as part of his performance of the U.S. national anthem before the Muhammad Ali vs. Chuck Wepner boxing match.

In 1990, singer Melba Moore released a modern rendition of the hymn, which she recorded with the assistance of other singers, including R&B artists Stephanie Mills, Freddie Jackson, Anita Baker, Dionne Warwick, Bobby Brown, Stevie Wonder, Jeffrey Osborne, and Howard Hewett; and gospel artists BeBe & CeCe Winans, Take 6, and The Clark Sisters, after which, "Lift Every Voice and Sing" was entered into the Congressional Record by delegate Walter Fauntroy (D-DC). The recording was added to the National Recording Registry in 2016.

In 2008, jazz singer René Marie was asked to sing the national anthem at a civic event in Denver, Colorado, where she caused a controversy by substituting the words of "Lift Every Voice and Sing" into the song. This arrangement of the words of "Lift Every Voice and Sing" with the melody of "The Star-Spangled Banner" became part of the titular suite on her 2011 CD release, The Voice of My Beautiful Country.

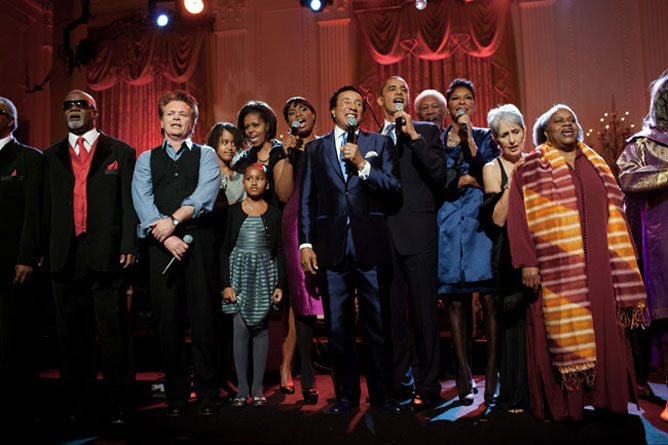
The family of Barack Obama, Smokey Robinson, and others singing "Lift Every Voice and Sing" in the White House in 2014

On January 20, 2009, the Rev. Joseph Lowery, a civil rights movement leader who co-founded and is a former president of the Southern Christian Leadership Conference, used a near-verbatim recitation of the hymn's third stanza to begin his benediction at the inauguration ceremony for President Barack Obama.

Jon Batiste, former bandleader of the late-night talk show The Late Show with Stephen Colbert, occasionally worked "Lift Every Voice and Sing" into the music that was played by his band Stay Human when the program hosted a Black guest; he stated that the hymn "connects us to the history of all the people who we stand on the shoulders of—who have marched and fought and died for the freedoms we enjoy and that we're trying to improve upon".

On February 20, 2016, Western Kentucky University premiered a concert band piece titled "Of Our New Day Begun" by Omar Thomas, which featured the hymn prominently. The piece was written in honor of nine people who died in a shooting in the Emanuel African Methodist Episcopal Church. The piece was influenced by many black music traditions such as gospel and blues.

On September 24, 2016, the hymn was sung by mezzo-soprano Denyce Graves and chorus at the conclusion of the opening ceremonies of the National Museum of African American History and Culture, at which Obama delivered the keynote address.

On October 19, 2017, when White supremacist leader Richard Spencer spoke at the University of Florida, music professor Laura Ellis played "Lift Every Voice and Sing" on the university's carillon to convey a message of unity.

On April 14, 2018, "Lift Every Voice and Sing" was sung by Beyoncé during her headlining performance at the Coachella Valley Music and Arts Festival.

In May 2018, the Tabernacle Choir performed "Lift Every Voice and Sing" during an edition of Music & the Spoken Word attended by members of the NAACP, who were in Salt Lake City for a national leadership meeting.

The song was featured as the opening and closing song of The Blues and Its People, a suite by Russell Gunn first performed on February 18, 2023, at Harlem's Apollo Theater to mark the 50th anniversary of Amiri Baraka's book Blues People: Negro Music in White America.

In June 2026, CBS News included the song in its list of the 250 essential American songs of the past 250 years.

=== Prominence after the George Floyd protests ===
In mid-2020, "Lift Every Voice and Sing" began to receive renewed attention amid nationwide protests over the police murder of George Floyd, which became a cause célèbre for what protesters considered brutal policing of the Black community: it was sung during demonstrations and other events which were held in solidarity. Presidential candidate Joe Biden referenced the hymn in his action plan for addressing racial disparities in the United States, which was titled "Lift Every Voice: The Biden Plan for Black America". On June 19, 2020, Google featured a Juneteenth-themed animation on its home page, set to a spoken word rendition of the hymn's first verse by LeVar Burton. In 2021, Vanessa Williams sang "Lift Every Voice and Sing" on the PBS Independence Day special A Capitol Fourth, commemorating the recognition of Juneteenth as a federal holiday.

The hymn also began to be incorporated into sporting events: during NASCAR's 2020 Pocono 350, musicians Mike Phillips and West Byrd quoted "Lift Every Voice and Sing" as part of their rendition of "The Star-Spangled Banner", while the National Football League announced that "Lift Every Voice and Sing" would be played or performed as part of the pre-game ceremonies of all Week 1 games during the 2020 season. The decision came as part of a new social justice campaign being introduced by the NFL, stemming from the league's acknowledgements of the Black Lives Matter movement, and its handling of players taking a knee during the singing of the national anthem in order to protest against racial inequality and police brutality. The NFL Kickoff Game featured a filmed performance of the hymn by Alicia Keys at the Los Angeles Memorial Coliseum, which was later replayed as part of the pre-game show of Super Bowl LV on February 7, 2021.

The NFL stated that it would again feature the hymn at Week 1 games and other "tentpole" events (including the NFL draft and playoff games) during the 2021 season. Some African American fans who were interviewed by NBC News felt that the NFL's decision fell short of having a material impact on the league's pursuits of social justice, despite their appreciation of the hymn's inclusion. As of February 2026, the song has been performed at six consecutive Super Bowl pregame ceremonies and is usually sung by a female artist.

== Text and melody ==
Lift every voice and sing,
'Til earth and heaven ring,
Ring with the harmonies of Liberty;
Let our rejoicing rise
High as the list'ning skies,
Let it resound loud as the rolling sea.
Sing a song full of the faith that the dark past has taught us,
Sing a song full of the hope that the present has brought us;
Facing the rising sun of our new day begun,
Let us march on 'til victory is won.

Stony the road we trod,
Bitter the chastening rod,
Felt in the days when hope unborn had died;
Yet with a steady beat,
Have not our weary feet
Come to the place for which our fathers sighed?
We have come, over a way that with tears has been watered,
We have come, treading our path through the blood of the slaughtered,
Out from the gloomy past,
'Til now we stand at last
Where the white gleam of our bright star is cast.

God of our weary years,
God of our silent tears,
Thou who has brought us thus far on the way;
Thou who has by Thy might
Led us into the light,
Keep us forever in the path, we pray.
Lest our feet stray from the places, our God, where we met Thee,
Lest our hearts, drunk with the wine of the world, we forget Thee;
Shadowed beneath Thy hand,
May we forever stand,
True to our God,
True to our native land.

== Certifications ==
Region	Certification	Certified units/sales
Brazil (Pro-Música Brasil) Beyoncé Homecoming Live Cover	Gold	20,000^{‡}
^{‡} Sales+streaming figures based on certification alone.
