= Ted Poston =

American journalist and author

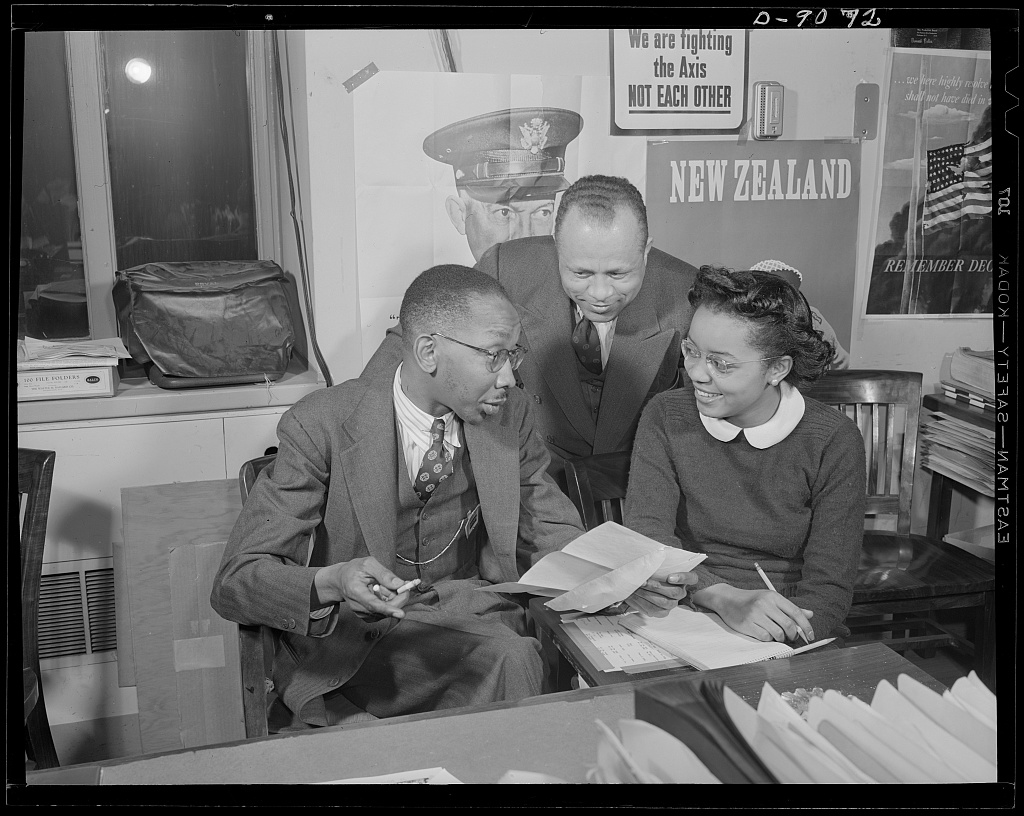
- Ted Poston (left) in 1943 while working at the OWI
- Born: Theodore Augustus Major Poston; July 4, 1906; Hopkinsville, Kentucky, United States
- Died: January 11, 1974 (aged 67); Brooklyn, New York City, United States
- Other name: Dean of Black Journalists
- Occupations: Journalist, author
- Years active: 1928–1974
- Spouse: Ersa Poston

Theodore Roosevelt Augustus Major Poston (July 4, 1906 – January 11, 1974) was an American journalist and author. He was among the first African-American journalists to work on a mainstream white-owned newspaper, the New York Post. Poston is often referred to as the "Dean of Black Journalists".

== Early life ==
Poston was born in Hopkinsville, Kentucky. His mother, Mollie Cox, died when he was ten, and his father, Ephraim Poston, taught the Kentucky State Industrial College for Negroes (now Kentucky State University). As a result, he was raised mostly by his elder siblings. As a teenager, Poston started writing for the Hopkinsville Contender, his family's newspaper.

In 1928, he graduated from Tennessee Agricultural and Industrial College (now Tennessee State University) and moved to New York.

== Career ==
Poston became a reporter for the New York Amsterdam News, a weekly newspaper geared to the city's African-American community, in Harlem in 1928. By 1935, he became editor of the paper but was later fired after attempting to unionize his fellow reporters.

The following year, he was temporarily hired by the New York Post in 1936, which made him the third black to be employed as a reporter for a major New York City daily paper.

When he was assigned to the New York City Police Department pressroom, no other reporters would talk to him. Within the ranks of the Post, he was considered a star reporter and was a favorite of the owner, Dorothy Schiff. Over the years, Poston used his influence with Schiff to lobby for hiring more Black and Puerto Rican reporters.

During his thirty-five-year career at the Post, Poston covered many important stories of the day, such as Jackie Robinson's entry into Major League Baseball, the Brown v. Board of Education case, and the efforts of the Little Rock Nine to integrate schools in Little Rock, Arkansas. While covering the story of the Little Rock Nine in 1959, he was shot at by a group of white men.

Poston also covered the Scottsboro Boys trials with much difficulty, as the authorities in Alabama would not allow a Black journalist to report in the segregated South. He had to resort to disguising himself as a preacher and secretly turning in his stories with the help of white colleagues. In 1949, he was pursued by white mobs when he attempted to cover the Groveland Four in Lake County, Florida. He safely escaped and wrote a series on the Groveland Case, for which the Post nominated him for a Pulitzer Prize.

During World War II, Poston temporarily left New York to work for the Office of War Information in Washington, D.C. There he served as "Negro liaison" for the Office, and was a part of Franklin D. Roosevelt's Black Cabinet. After Roosevelt's death, Poston joined other black journalists in pressuring Harry S. Truman to desegregate the military.

== Later years ==
Poston retired from the Post in 1972 to work on a collection of autobiographical short stories. He was unable to complete the work as he suffered from complications of arteriosclerosis. He died on January 11, 1974, at his home in Bedford–Stuyvesant, Brooklyn.

== Legacy ==
Poston was one of the first journalists inducted into the National Association of Black Journalists Hall of Fame when it opened in 1990. In 1999, his series on the Groveland Case was named one of the 100 most important journalistic works of the 20th century by New York University's School of Journalism. His book of short stories was published posthumously in 1991 as The Dark Side of Hopkinsville.

== Personal life ==
Poston was married three times. His first wife was Miriam Rivers (m. 1935–1940). In 1941, while working in Washington, he married Marie Byrd Tancil, a staffer for Robert C. Weaver. The couple divorced in 1956.

Poston married Ersa Hines Clinton, who was also from Kentucky, in 1957. She was the Area Director for the New York State Division of Youth, and later the confidential assistant to New York Governor Nelson Rockefeller, and she became the New York State Civil Service Commissioner during her marriage to Poston. They remained married until Poston died in 1974, although they were separated.

Poston was friends with poet Langston Hughes, and traveled to the Soviet Union with him in 1932, to appear in an anti-segregation film. He also lived next door to his friend civil rights attorney Thurgood Marshall for many years.

== Awards and honors ==
- 1949 George Polk Award for National Reporting
- 1949 Heywood Broun Award
- 1972 Black Perspective award for Pioneering Journalists
- 1990 National Association of Black Journalists Hall of Fame inductee
