= Lake Shore, Minnesota =

City in Minnesota, United States

Lake Shore
- City
- Location of Lake Shore within Cass County, Minnesota
- Coordinates: 46°30′14″N 94°21′49″W
- Country: United States
- State: Minnesota
- County: Cass
- Incorporated (village): 1930
- Incorporated (city): March 19th, 1947

Area
  - Total: 16.00 sq mi (41.44 km^{2})
  - Land: 12.68 sq mi (32.85 km^{2})
  - Water: 3.32 sq mi (8.59 km^{2})
- Elevation: 1,243 ft (379 m)

Population (2020)
  - Total: 1,056
  - Estimate (2021): 1,090
  - Density: 83.3/sq mi (32.15/km^{2})
- Time zone: UTC-6 (Central)
  - Summer (DST): UTC-5 (CDT)
- ZIP code: 56468
- Area code: 218
- FIPS code: 27-34928
- GNIS feature ID: 2395601
- Website: www.cityoflakeshore.gov

Lake Shore is a city in Cass County, Minnesota, United States. The population was 1,056 at the 2020 census. It is part of the Brainerd Micropolitan Statistical Area.

== History ==
Lake Shore was incorporated on March 19, 1947.

== Geography ==
According to the United States Census Bureau, the city has an area of 18.15 square miles (47.01 km^{2}), of which 12.70 square miles (32.89 km^{2}) is land and 5.45 square miles (14.12 km^{2}) is water. County Roads 29, 77, 78, and 107 are the main routes in the community.

== Demographics ==
Historical population
Census	Pop.	Note	%±
1940	227		—
1950	326		43.6%
1960	264		−19.0%
1970	410		55.3%
1980	583		42.2%
1990	693		18.9%
2000	966		39.4%
2010	1,004		3.9%
2020	1,056		5.2%
2021 (est.)	1,090		3.2%
U.S. Decennial Census; 2020 Census

=== 2010 census ===
As of the census of 2010, there were 1,004 people, 451 households, and 322 families living in the city. The population density was 79.1 inhabitants per square mile (30.5/km^{2}). There were 1,019 housing units at an average density of 80.2 per square mile (31.0/km^{2}). The racial makeup of the city was 99.0% White, 0.3% African American, 0.1% Native American, 0.1% Asian, 0.1% from other races, and 0.4% from two or more races. Hispanic or Latino of any race were 0.9% of the population.

There were 451 households, of which 19.3% had children under the age of 18 living with them, 65.4% were married couples living together, 3.1% had a female householder with no husband present, 2.9% had a male householder with no wife present, and 28.6% were non-families. 23.9% of all households were made up of individuals, and 8.7% had someone living alone who was 65 years of age or older. The average household size was 2.23 and the average family size was 2.60.

The median age in the city was 51.5 years. 17.4% of residents were under the age of 18; 3.2% were between the ages of 18 and 24; 19.5% were from 25 to 44; 36.3% were from 45 to 64; and 23.9% were 65 years of age or older. The gender makeup of the city was 52.7% male and 47.3% female.

=== 2000 census ===
As of the census of 2000, there were 966 people, 436 households, and 327 families living in the city. The population density was 75.5 inhabitants per square mile (29.2/km^{2}). There were 858 housing units at an average density of 67.1 per square mile (25.9/km^{2}). The racial makeup of the city was 98.76% White, 0.41% Native American, 0.10% Asian, 0.10% from other races, and 0.62% from two or more races. Hispanic or Latino of any race were 0.21% of the population.

There were 436 households, out of which 18.3% had children under the age of 18 living with them, 70.0% were married couples living together, 3.0% had a female householder with no husband present, and 25.0% were non-families. 20.6% of all households were made up of individuals, and 7.1% had someone living alone who was 65 years of age or older. The average household size was 2.22 and the average family size was 2.54.

In the city, the population was spread out, with 16.4% under the age of 18, 3.5% from 18 to 24, 22.9% from 25 to 44, 37.6% from 45 to 64, and 19.7% who were 65 years of age or older. The median age was 49 years. For every 100 females, there were 113.7 males. For every 100 females age 18 and over, there were 114.3 males.

The median income for a household in the city was $51,500, and the median income for a family was $56,563. Males had a median income of $41,319 versus $24,688 for females. The per capita income for the city was $33,387. About 2.5% of families and 4.5% of the population were below the poverty line, including 2.6% of those under age 18 and 7.3% of those age 65 or over.
