= Charles M. Poston =

American railroad employee and politician

Charles M. Poston Sr.

Louisiana State Senator from Beauregard, Sabine, and Vernon parishes
- In office 1960–1964
- Preceded by: Frank Estes Cole
- Succeeded by: Bryan Anthony Poston, Sr.

Personal details
- Born: February 14, 1898
- Died: November 1968 (aged 70)
- Party: Democratic
- Occupation: Railroad employee

Charles M. Poston Sr. (February 14, 1898 – November 1968), was a Louisiana railroad employee who served in the Louisiana State Senate from 1960 to 1964

Preceded by Frank Estes Cole	Louisiana State Senator from Beauregard, Sabine, and Vernon parishes); 1960–1964	Succeeded by Bryan A. Poston
