= Bryan A. Poston =

American politician and businessman

Bryan Anthony Poston, Sr.

Louisiana State Senator for District 30 (Beauregard, Calcasieu, and Vernon parishes)
- In office 1964–1992
- Preceded by: Charles M. Poston, Sr.
- Succeeded by: James David Cain

Personal details
- Born: March 11, 1924 Benson, De Soto Parish, Louisiana, US
- Died: October 3, 2009 (aged 85) Many, Sabine Parish; Louisiana
- Resting place: Prewitt's Chapel Cemetery in Hornbeck, Louisiana
- Party: Democratic
- Education: Louisiana State University
- Occupation: Businessman
- Poston was unopposed for his seventh and final term as a Louisiana state senator in the nonpartisan blanket primary held on October 19, 1991.

Bryan Anthony Poston Sr. (March 11, 1924 – October 4, 2009) was an American politician and businessman.

== Background ==
Poston was born in Benson, Louisiana to Charles and Marjorie Poston. He went to Louisiana State University. He served in the United States Army Air Forces during World War II as an Aerial Engineer Gunner Sgt. on a B-17 Bomber. Later, he served in the Louisiana Senate from 1964 until 1991.

Poston lived with his wife and family in Hornbeck, Louisiana and was a businessman. He retired in 1991 and died with Alzheimer's disease in Many, Louisiana.

Preceded by Charles M. Poston, Sr.	Louisiana State Senator from District 30 (then Beauregard, Sabine, and Vernon parishes); Bryan Anthony Poston, Sr. 1964–1992	Succeeded by James David Cain
