= Robert S. Poston =

American cardiac surgeon (born 1967)

- Born: September 27, 1967 (age 58); Dallas, Texas; United States
- Education: University of Texas at Austin, Johns Hopkins Medical School
- Medical career
- Profession: Cardiac surgeon
- Institutions: University of Maryland Medical Center, Boston Medical Center, University of Arizona Medical Center
- Research: MIDCAB, Coronary artery bypass surgery

Robert S. Poston is an American cardiac surgeon at Mercy-Lourdes Hospital, Paducah, KY nationally recognized for his work in robot-assisted cardiothoracic surgery. He previously served as cardiac surgeon at University of Arizona Medical Center most noted for his work in robot-assisted heart surgery and Coronary Artery Bypass Surgery.

His past research interest regarding the mechanism of early graft thrombosis was recognized with a five-year RO1 clinical research grant from the National Institutes of Health (2007-12).

== Education ==
Poston attended University of Texas at Austin from 1986 to 1989 where he played for the Texas Longhorns baseball team as a catcher. He graduated Phi Beta Kappa focusing on pre-medical studies, subsequently matriculating to Johns Hopkins Medical School.

After graduating with AOA honors from Johns Hopkins Medical School in 1993, Poston completed a residency in general surgery at the University of California-San Francisco, research fellowship in Cardiothoracic Surgery at Stanford University School of Medicine, and clinical cardiothoracic residency at the University of Pittsburgh Medical Center.

== Career ==
Poston's first clinical appointment started in July 2002 under his mentor, Bartley Griffith at the University of Maryland School of Medicine. With Griffith's guidance, he pursued his niche in NIH clinical research and off-pump robotic CABG, establishing a national reputation in these areas. Subsequently, he was recruited to become the chief of cardiac surgery at Boston University in March 2008.

Poston came to Boston Medical Center as the chief of Cardiac Surgery with a mandate to establish a program in robotic coronary bypass surgery. As a result of a major marketing campaign by the hospital and Poston's outreach to local cardiologists, the program quickly attracted patients not only from their traditional catchment area but from widely throughout New England.

Poston was recruited by another important mentor, Rainer Gruessner, chairman of surgery at University of Arizona Medical Center. With Gruessner's support and the recruitment of an expert in thoracic robotics, Farid Gharagozloo, Poston built the highest volume academic center for robotic CT surgery in the country in 2012-13 and performed the world's first robotic LVAD implant procedure. Gruessner subsequently moved from Tucson to Brooklyn NY in hopes of recreating a similar program at SUNY-Downstate and recruited Poston to lead their CT surgery division.

At SUNY-Downstate Medical Center Poston started another robotic CT surgical program in Brooklyn. Similar to Boston and Tucson, he arrived in Brooklyn knowing that robotic cardiac surgery had never been done in that city up to that point. This robotic option was accepted by the referring cardiology group, led by Dr. Jonathan Marmur.

Poston has also served in leadership roles outside of academic institutions including as Chairman of the Department of Cardiovascular Surgery at St. Francis Medical Center in New Jersey in 2013-15 and as Medical Director of CT surgery at Mercy Health Lourdes in Paducah, Kentucky in 2025.

== Research ==
Poston's research deals with the mechanism of early graft thrombosis was recognized with a five-year RO1 clinical research grant from the National Institutes of Health in 2007. He has also been awarded grants from Intuitive Surgical to study how robotics accelerates patient recovery time, Maquet to study the impact of endoscopic harvesting techniques on the quality of bypass conduits, and Cardiogenesis to study the impact of laser revascularization techniques on bypass graft flow. He has been the first/senior author of 100 papers and abstracts. His research manuscripts are available on PubMed.
