= John Poston (British Army officer) =

Aide-de-camp to Field Marshall Montgomery

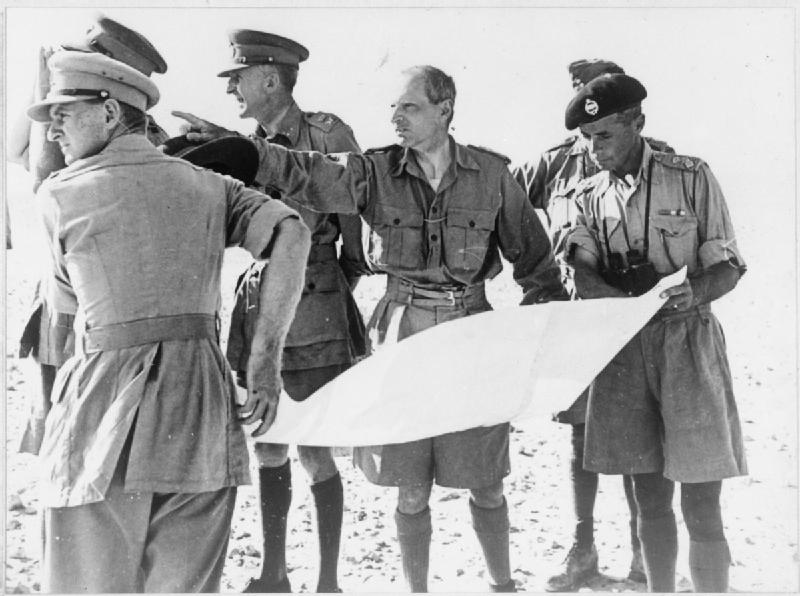
- Montgomery and staff (Poston is on his left).
- Military career
- Allegiance: United Kingdom
- Branch: British Army
- Service years: 1940–1945
- Rank: Major
- Service number: 87368
- Unit: 11th Hussars
- Conflicts: Second World War: Battle of Beda Fomm; North African campaign; Battle of Alam Halfa; Second Battle of El Alamein; Battle of El Agheila; Tunisian campaign; Battle of Medenine; Battle of the Mareth Line; Sicily campaign; Italian campaign; Western Front; Operation Overlord; Battle for Caen; Operation Goodwood; Operation Cobra; Operation Market Garden; Battle of the Bulge; Operation Veritable; Invasion of Germany; Operation Varsity; Operation Plunder
- Awards: Military Cross & Bar

Major John William Poston MC & Bar (1919 – 21 April 1945) (son of Colonel William John Lloyd Poston, D.S.O., and of Marjorie Blanch Poston née Dalglish, of Barnes, Surrey) was a cavalry officer of the British Army best known for serving as the Aide-de-camp to Field Marshal Sir Bernard Law Montgomery from his North African Campaign to the final week of war in Europe.

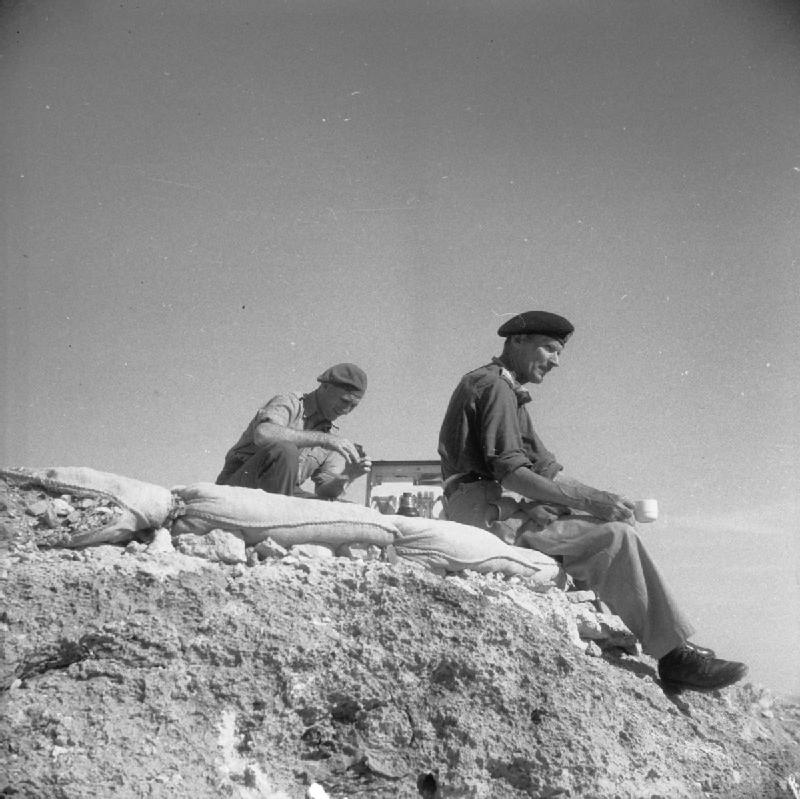
During the advance from Sollum through the Halfaya Pass, Montgomery sits on a hillside to have a picnic lunch; behind him is his ADC, Captain John Poston.

Poston was educated at Harrow. Commissioned as an officer in the 11th Hussars in January 1940, Poston served with distinction in North Africa in the early part of the war. He commanded the 'A' Squadron, 11th Hussar during Operation Compass and won the Military Cross in March 1942. He was selected by Lieutenant General William Gott to serve as his Aide-de-Camp. General Gott was killed soon after when his aircraft was ambushed by Luftwaffe fighters. His successor Lieutenant General Bernard Montgomery retained Poston as his ADC. He was promoted to captain in November 1943 and to Major in December 1944 also winning a bar to his MC.

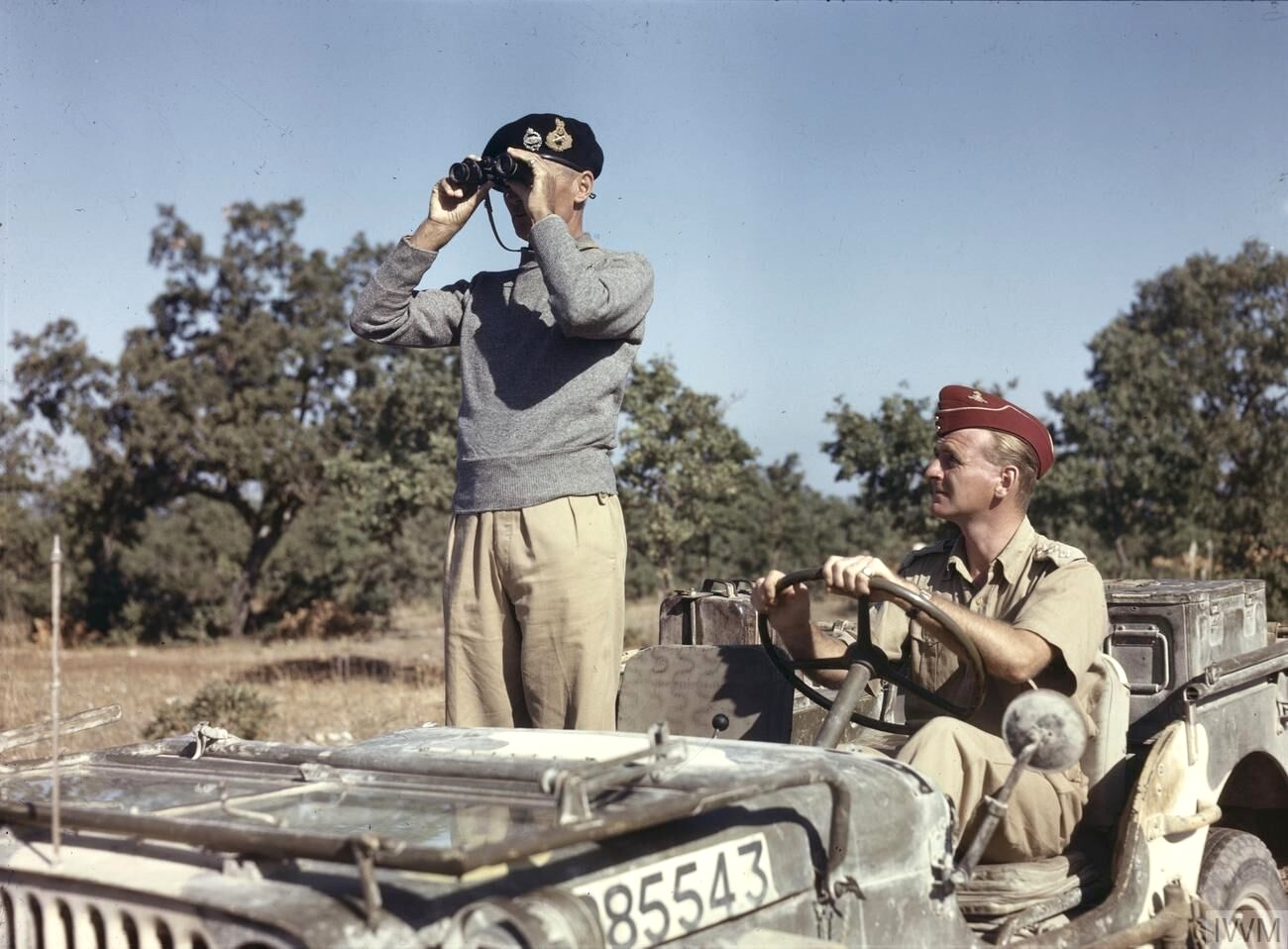
General Montgomery standing in a jeep with one of his aides, Captain J. W. Poston, in camp at Eighth Army HQ in Italy, 30 September 1943.

He was killed in an ambush by German forces on 21 April 1945 returning to Field Marshal Montgomery's tactical HQ at Luneburg Heath. He was 25 years at the time of death and was buried at Becklingen War Cemetery which overlooks Luneburg Heath where, on 4 May 1945, Field-Marshal Montgomery accepted the German surrender from Admiral Doenitz.

Montgomery, writing Poston's obituary in The Times, stated that "There can be few young officers who have seen this war from the inside as did John Poston; he knew everything that was going on; he was in possession of much information that is secret and must remain secret for all time: I trusted him absolutely and he never once failed me...I was completely devoted to him and I feel very sad; something has definitely gone out of my life".
