= Robert Lincoln Poston =

American publisher and writer

Robert T. Lincoln Poston (February 25, 1891 – March 16, 1924) was an African-American newspaper editor and journalist, who was an activist in Marcus Garvey's Universal Negro Improvement Association (UNIA). He died at sea as he returned from a UNIA mission to Liberia.

== Biography ==
Poston was born in Hopkinsville, Kentucky. He came from a family of journalists and writers. His father, Ephraim Poston, was a teacher, poet and graduate of Roger Williams University in Nashville, Tennessee, who authored Manual on Parliamentary Proceedings, 1905, and Pastoral Poems, 1906. Poston's mother was the former Mollie Cox of Oak Grove, Kentucky. Poston had six siblings: Fred Douglass, Ulysses Grant, Ephraim, Jr., Roberta, Lillian, and Theodore Roosevelt Poston.

Poston attended Nashville's Walden University, as well as Howard University. He became a newspaper publisher and editor while in Detroit, Michigan. Later, he contributed poems, literary criticism, and sometimes editorials to the UNIA-ACL's Negro World newspaper. He attained the position of Assistant Secretary-General of the UNIA in 1921 and then was promoted to Secretary General in 1922. His brother Ulysses served as associate editor of the Negro World. Robert and Ulysses were among the co-directors of a play the UNIA dramatic club put on in 1922, entitled "Tallaboo".

== Personal life ==
Poston married the sculptor Augusta Savage in 1923.

== Death ==
In December of 1923, he was the leader of a delegation sent to Liberia by the UNIA. The purpose of the trip was to finalize arrangements for a mass emigration of African Americans to Liberia. He was accompanied on this trip by Henrietta Vinton Davis and Milton Van Lowe, among others. Poston and the others met with President King of Liberia, but they were not ultimately able to obtain the permissions and aid that they required. Poston could not hide his disappointment on the voyage home. While on board the SS President Grant, he contracted a fever and died of lobar pneumonia.

== Legacy ==
On March 19, 1924, Poston was posthumously given the rank of Prince of Africa by the UNIA during an elaborate state funeral at Liberty Hall.
