= Kay Katz =

American politician

Member of the Louisiana House of Representatives from the 16th district
- In office November 2, 1999 – January 2012
- Succeeded by: Katrina Jackson

Monroe City Council Member from District 2
- In office 1995 – November 2, 1999

Personal details
- Born: 1938 (age 87–88)
- Party: Republican

Kay Kellogg Katz (born 1938) is an American politician who served in the Louisiana House of Representatives from 1999 to 2012.

== Biography ==
Katz was born in 1938. She first attended high school at Neville High School in Monroe, Louisiana. She later transferred to Starkville High School in Starkville, Mississippi, where she met her husband, Ben Katz. She earned her bachelor's degree from Mississippi State University.

She first ran for public office in 1992, when she unsuccessfully ran for the Police Jury of Ouachita Parish. In 1995, Katz was elected to the Monroe City Council, representing District 2. In 1998, she decided to run for District 16 in the Louisiana House of Representatives. She was sworn in on November 2, 1999, resigning her position on the city council at the same time. She was re-elected in 2003 and 2007. As the Louisiana House of Representatives only allows members to serve three terms, she was term-limited and unable to run for a fourth.
