= Louisiana's 16th House of Representatives district =

American legislative district

Louisiana's 16th State House of Representatives district
Representative
Adrian Fisher; D–Monroe

Louisiana's 16th House of Representatives district is one of 105 Louisiana House of Representatives districts. It is currently represented by Democrat Adrian Fisher of Monroe.

== Geography ==
HD16 includes parts of the communities of Collinston, and Swartz and parts of the cities of Bastrop and Monroe.

== Election results ==
Year	Winning candidate	Party	Percent	Opponent	Party	Percent	Opponent	Party	Percent	Opponent	Party	Percent
2011	Katrina Jackson	Democratic	51%	Samuel Jackson	Republican	25.6%	Ronnie Traylor	Democratic	15.9%	James M. Murphy	Independent	7.5%
2015	Katrina Jackson	Democratic	100%									
2019 (Note: Primary elections in which no candidate receives a plurality of 50% or more would result in a general between the top two candidates, however Berry's withdrawal allowed Jones to win by default as the general election was cancelled.)	Frederick D. Jones	Democratic	49.7%	Daryll Berry	Democratic	22.7% (Withdrew)	Alicia Calvin	Democratic	15.4%	Charles Bradford	Democratic	12.1%
2021 (special)	Adrian Fisher	Democratic	69.3%	Alicia Calvin	Democratic	19.8%	Charles Bradford	Democratic	10.9%			
2023	Adrian Fisher	Democratic	Cancelled									
