= Chennault Aviation and Military Museum =

Museum in Monroe, Louisiana

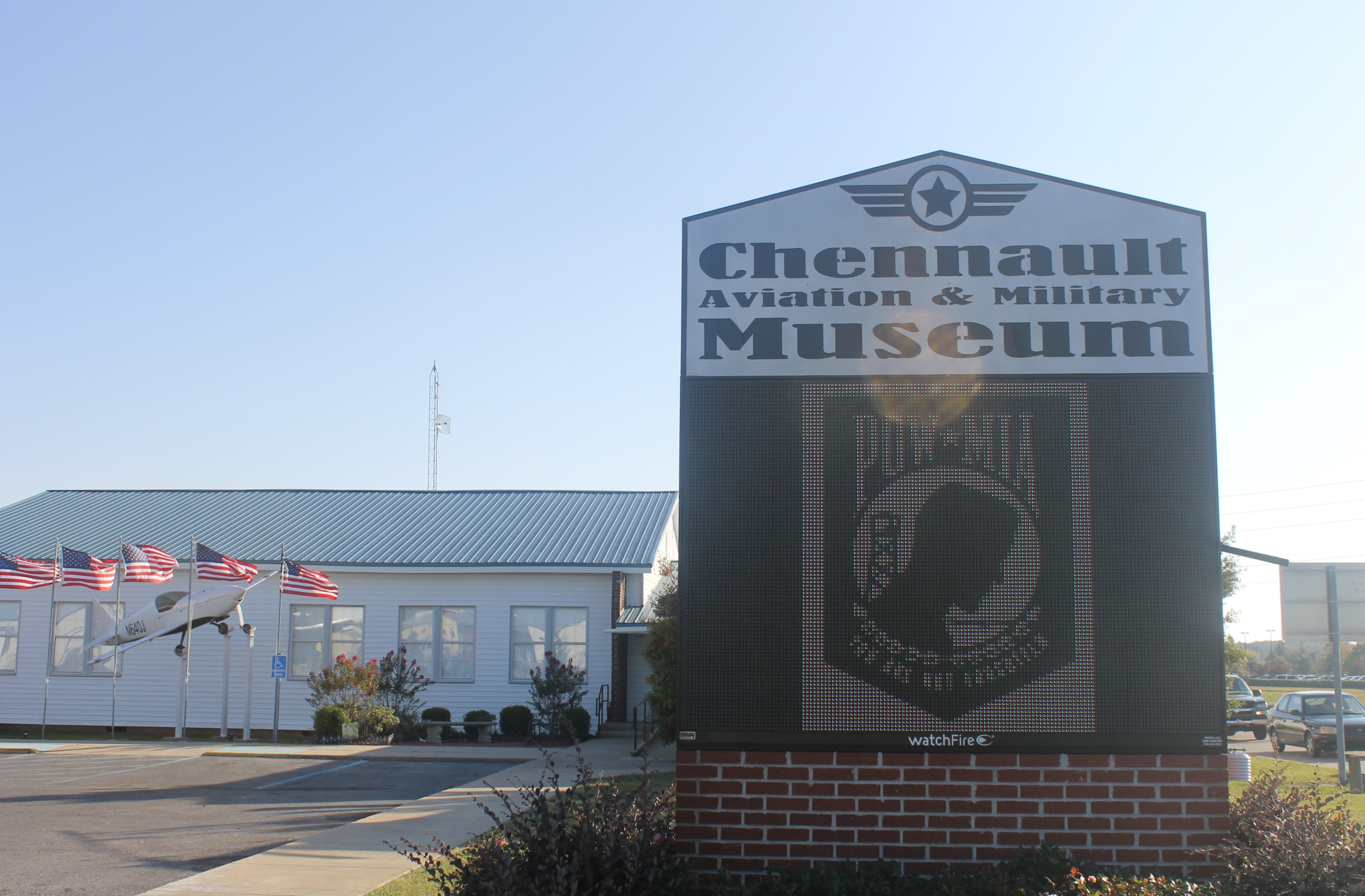

- Location within Louisiana
- Established: 2000
- Location: Monroe, Louisiana
- Coordinates: 32.5115°N 92.0548°W
- Type: Military, aviation museum
- Website: www.chennaultmuseum.org

The Chennault Aviation and Military Museum is a museum located in Monroe, Louisiana that preserves and highlights the establishment of the local aviation industry. It exhibits artifacts from World War I to the Afghanistan War, including aircraft and vehicle displays. The museum is named in honor of United States Army Air Force General Claire Lee Chennault.

== History ==
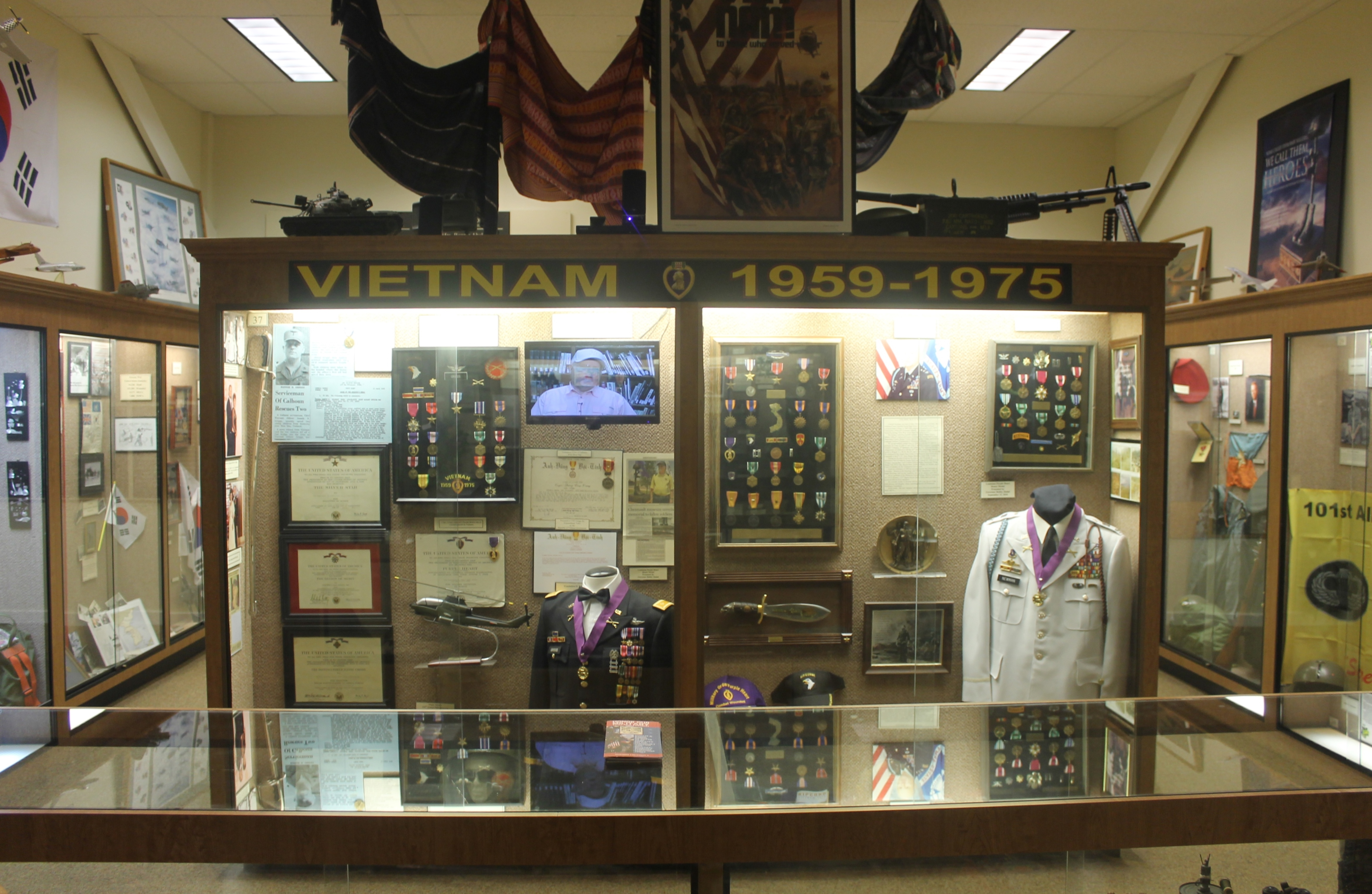
Vietnam War exhibit

The museum grew out of a reunion, first held in 1986, of airmen who had trained at Selman Field during World War II.

The Aviation Historical Museum of Louisiana opened to the public on 11 November 2000. By July 2004, the museum's name had changed to the Aviation and Military Museum of Louisiana. By February 2007, the museum had plans to build a 7,000 sq ft (650 m^{2}) expansion, but difficulties obtaining funding from the state delayed the project. The expansion was opened in November of that year, increasing the museum's total size to 10,625 sq ft (987.1 m^{2}). Following the passage of a bill in the Louisiana State Legislature, the museum's name changed again to Chennault Aviation and Military Museum in August 2008. It broke ground on an aircraft restoration building in August 2010.

Following the latter's financial difficulties two years earlier, the museum separated from the Louisiana State Museum system in 2015. Chennault's granddaughter, Nell Calloway, became CEO of the museum in 2017.

Beginning in 2022 the museum began partnering with local universities. These efforts included: students from Louisiana Tech University painting a mural on the side of the museum in May, the signing of a memorandum of understanding with the University of Louisiana Monroe in December and the restoration of the museum's deuce and a half truck by students from Louisiana Delta Community College in 2024.

== Facilities ==
An aviation park displaying several aircraft is adjacent to the museum. A research library is also present.

== Exhibits ==
A room called Way of a Fighter is dedicated to General Chennault. A memorial to soldiers killed in action and a statue of General Chennault donated by Taiwan are located in front of the museum.

== Collection ==
- Beechcraft C-45H Expeditor – converted to resemble AT-7
- Beechcraft SNB-5 – converted to resemble M18R
- Bell UH-1H Iroquois
- Curtiss P-40F Warhawk – 3/4 scale replica
- Douglas DC-3
- Hughes OH-6A Cayuse
- Jones WLAC-1 White Lightning
- LTV A-7E Corsair II 154485
- Mikoyan-Gurevich MiG-15UTI
- North American F-86L Sabre

== Events ==
The museum holds an annual Run for the Red, White, and Blue Race.

== Programs ==
The museum operates a veterans' closet. It hosts competitions for students as part of National History Day.
