= 2020 Monroe tornado =

Damaging EF3 tornado in Louisiana

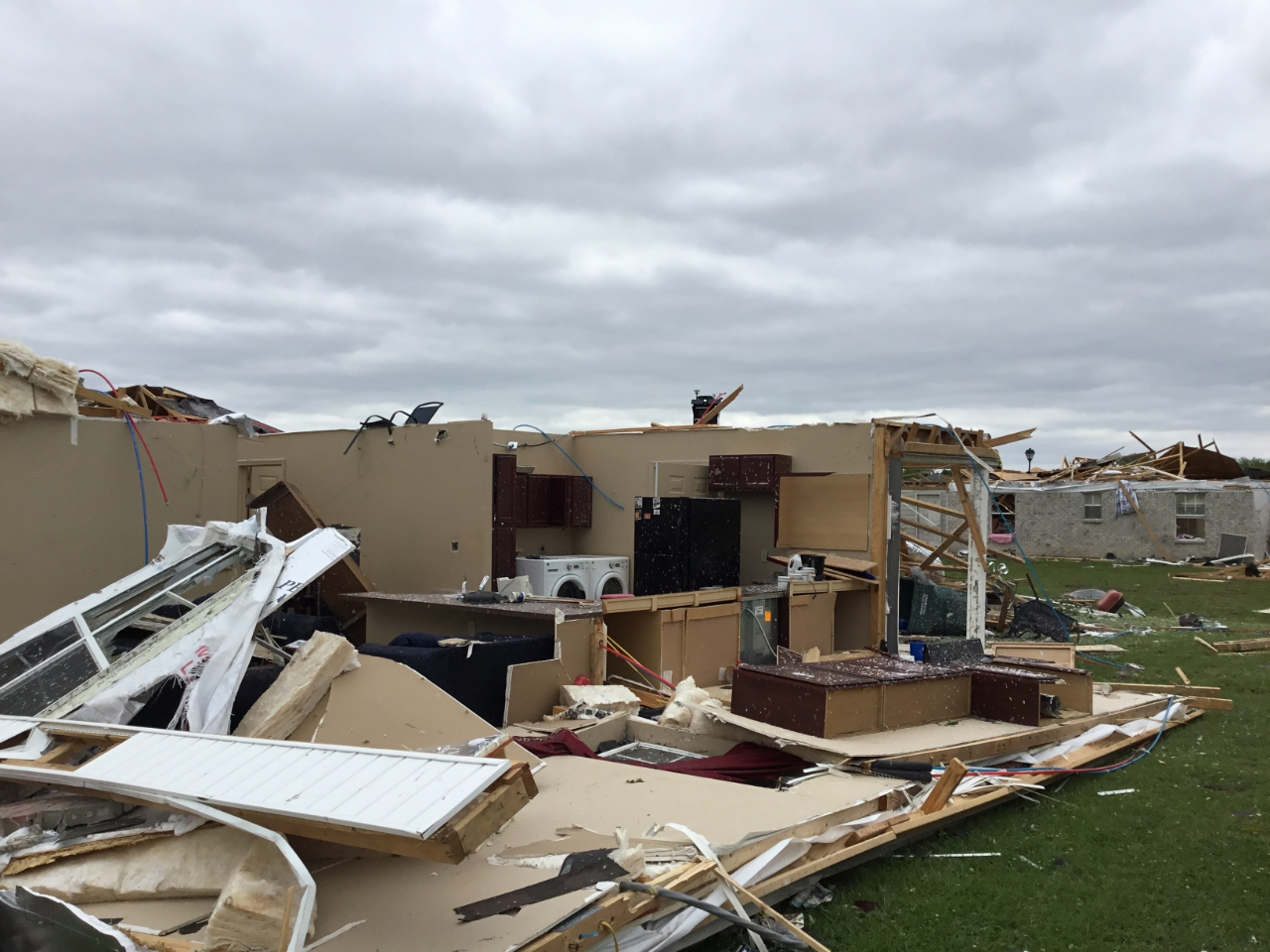
- A damaged house in Monroe after the tornado.

Meteorological history
- Formed: April 12, 2020, 11:36 a.m. CST
- Dissipated: April 12, 2020, 11:45 a.m. CST
- Duration: 9 minutes

EF3 tornado
- on the Enhanced Fujita scale
- Path length: 8.01 miles (12.89 km)
- Highest winds: 140 mph (230 km/h)

Overall effects
- Fatalities: None
- Injuries: None
- Damage: $250 million (2020 USD)
- Areas affected: Monroe metropolitan area, Louisiana
- Part of the 2020 Easter tornado outbreak and Tornadoes of 2020

During the late morning hours of April 12, 2020, a short-lived but damaging tornado struck Monroe, Louisiana, as part of a historic tornado outbreak. The tornado touched down at 10:36 CST (15:36 UTC) and dissipated nine minutes later at 10:45 CST (15:45 UTC). The tornado reached EF3 intensity on the Enhanced Fujita scale, with a total track length of 8.01 miles (12.89 kilometres) and a width of 300 yards (270 metres). It damaged numerous houses, mostly their roofs. The Ouachita Parish Office of Homeland Security and Emergency Preparedness estimated a total of 458 houses were damaged by the storms, with the damage from the tornado that struck Monroe amounting to $250 million (2020 USD). (Note: All amounts of money are in 2020 USD unless stated otherwise.)

== Meteorological synopsis ==
=== Background ===
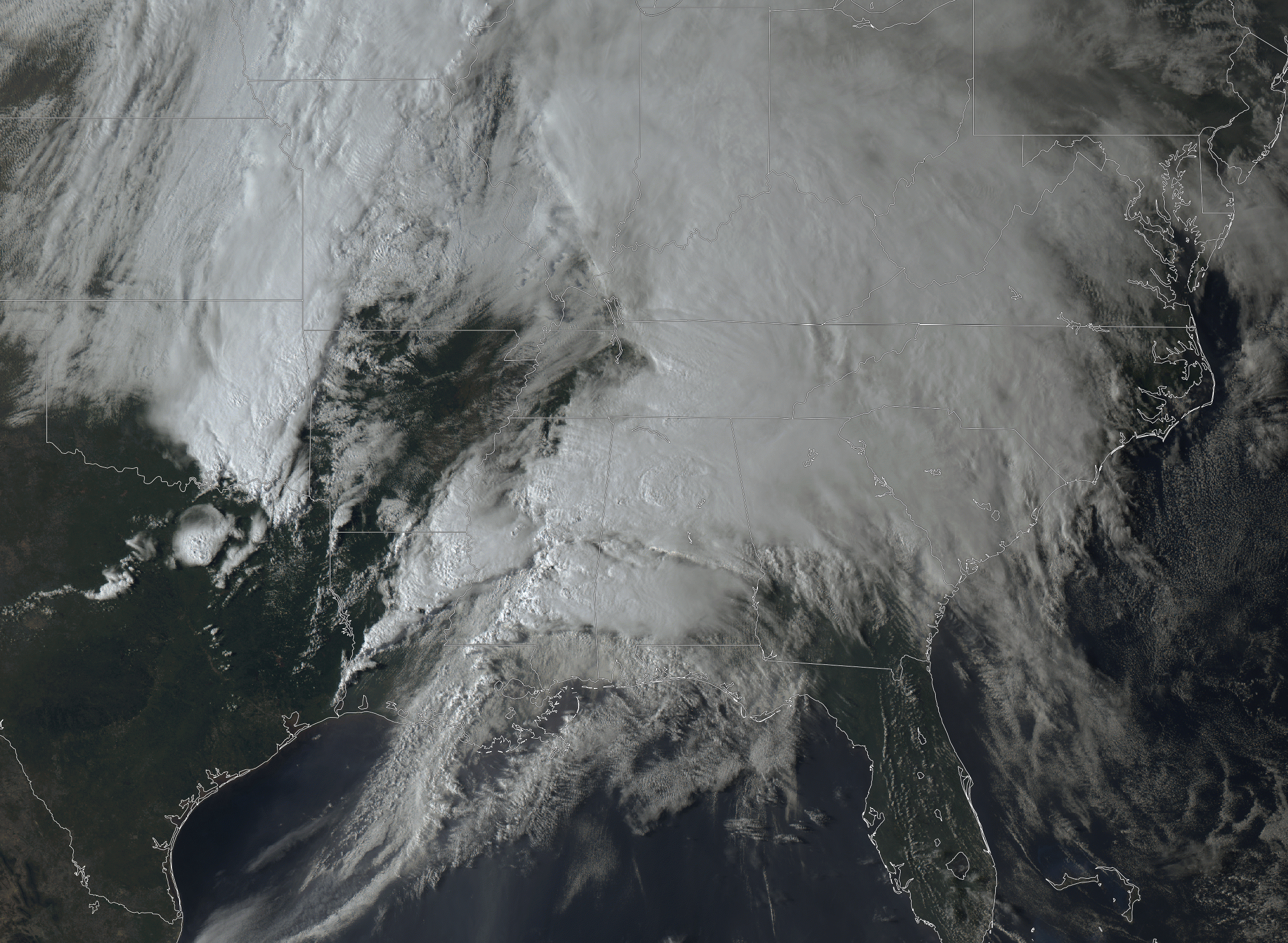
Satellite image of the 2020 Easter tornado outbreak over the Southeastern United States at 21:56 UTC on April 12, 2020, as imaged by the GOES-16 satellite

In March and April, an expansive area of high pressure expanded across the Southeast United States, causing warm temperatures in many areas in the United States, with calm weather due to the high-pressure area inducing rapid warming of the Gulf of Mexico waters to high values. Increased instability and different weather from the Gulf of Mexico led to higher risk of tornado activity. On April 1, the Storm Prediction Center (SPC) outlined a "marginal," level 1-out-of-5 risk for severe weather in its day 3 weather outlook for eastern Louisiana and most of the central United States. Several days before the tornado, the SPC noted a possible severe weather event within Louisiana and Mississippi. Through April 11 and 12, warm air rushed through East Texas, North Louisiana, and Southern Arkansas, associated with a warm front and an upper-level low, which produced multiple rain showers and thunderstorms. Some of the storms were severe, containing strong winds and hail. These storms amounted to a total of nine tornadoes across Louisiana. At 16:30 UTC, most of Mississippi and Alabama had a 15% chance for tornado formation. At approximately 11:00 CDT (17:00 UTC), these storms were moving Northeast, approaching the Ouachita Parish. From these conditions, the Monroe tornado formed. The SPC outlined a "moderate" level 4-out-of-5 for most of Louisiana and Alabama in its Day 2 Outlook on April 11. Before the Monroe tornado, 10 other tornadoes happened on April 12 in Louisiana, seven rated as EF1, one rated EF2, and two rated EF3.

== Tornado summary ==
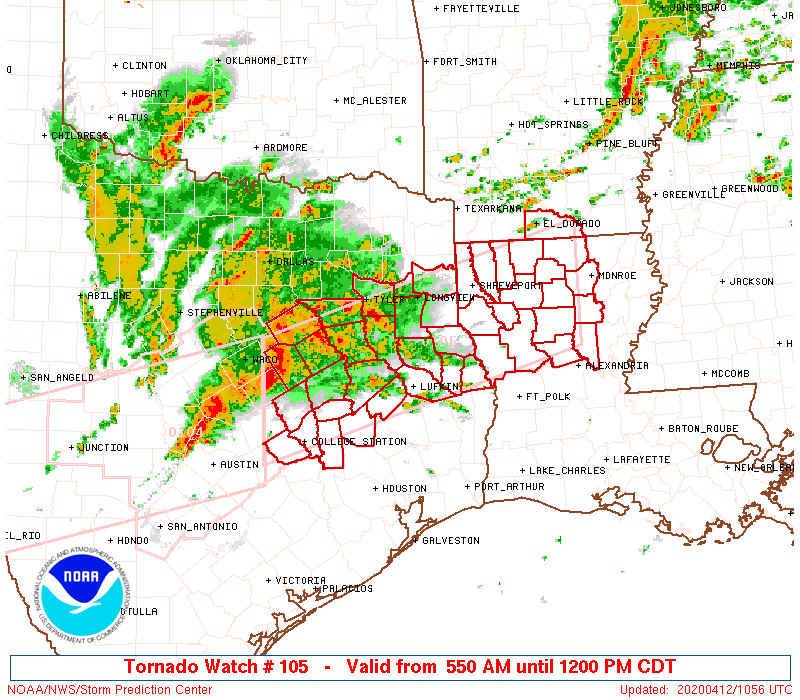
The 105th tornado watch of 2020, published by the National Oceanic and Atmospheric Administration. In Louisiana, specifically Monroe, NOAA noted the possibility of a tornado formation in 5:50 a.m., April 12, 2020. The storm was predicted to advance towards Monroe.

On April 12, 2020, at 10:36 CST (15:36 UTC), the tornado touched down between Fern Street and Brown Street within Brownsville-Bawcomville, Louisiana. Just after it touched down, it snapped hundreds of trees around the Brownsville-Bawcomville area at EF1 intensity. Some of the remains of the trees then fell onto homes. The tornado crossed Sandal Street, where EF1-intensity damage to homes and a tipped trailer were found, and it then crossed LA 34 and blew a conveyor belt onto a train at the Graphic Packaging International Paper Mill. Two minutes after its formation, it briefly strengthened to EF2 intensity, snapping wooden power poles before weakening back to EF1 strength. It crossed the Ouachita River twice, where it again reached EF1 strength before turning sharply to the Northeast, strengthening to EF2 intensity over Riverbend Drive. It then crossed the river again before avoiding Downtown Monroe by a mile, crossing South Grand Street. Past the Ouachita River, the tornado broke multiple trees and ripped off a roof from a home at EF1 intensity. It also inflicted minor damage to the Masur Museum of Art before damaging the roofs of homes inside Monroe, and it damaged a structure and tipped multiple poles at EF1 intensity as well. It then crossed over I-20 at the US 165 interchange and then crossed Milhaven Road. The peak intensity of the tornado occurred at Orchid Drive, where the tornado caused the collapse of both interior and exterior walls in a residential single-story house at EF3 intensity; three roofs were damaged, with one home partially damaged. Shortly after, it intensified back to EF2 strength. The tornado then went near Monroe Regional Airport, where it destroyed a hangar at EF2 intensity, and it then dissipated at 10:45 CST (10:45 UTC), the same day, with a total duration of nine minutes. It had an intensity of EF3 on the Enhanced Fujita scale, with a track length of 8.01 mi (12.89 km) and a width of 300 yd (270 m). Just after the tornado's dissipation, at 11:44 CST (16:44 UTC), a tornado emergency was declared over Monroe and Northeast Ouachita Parish.

== Impact ==
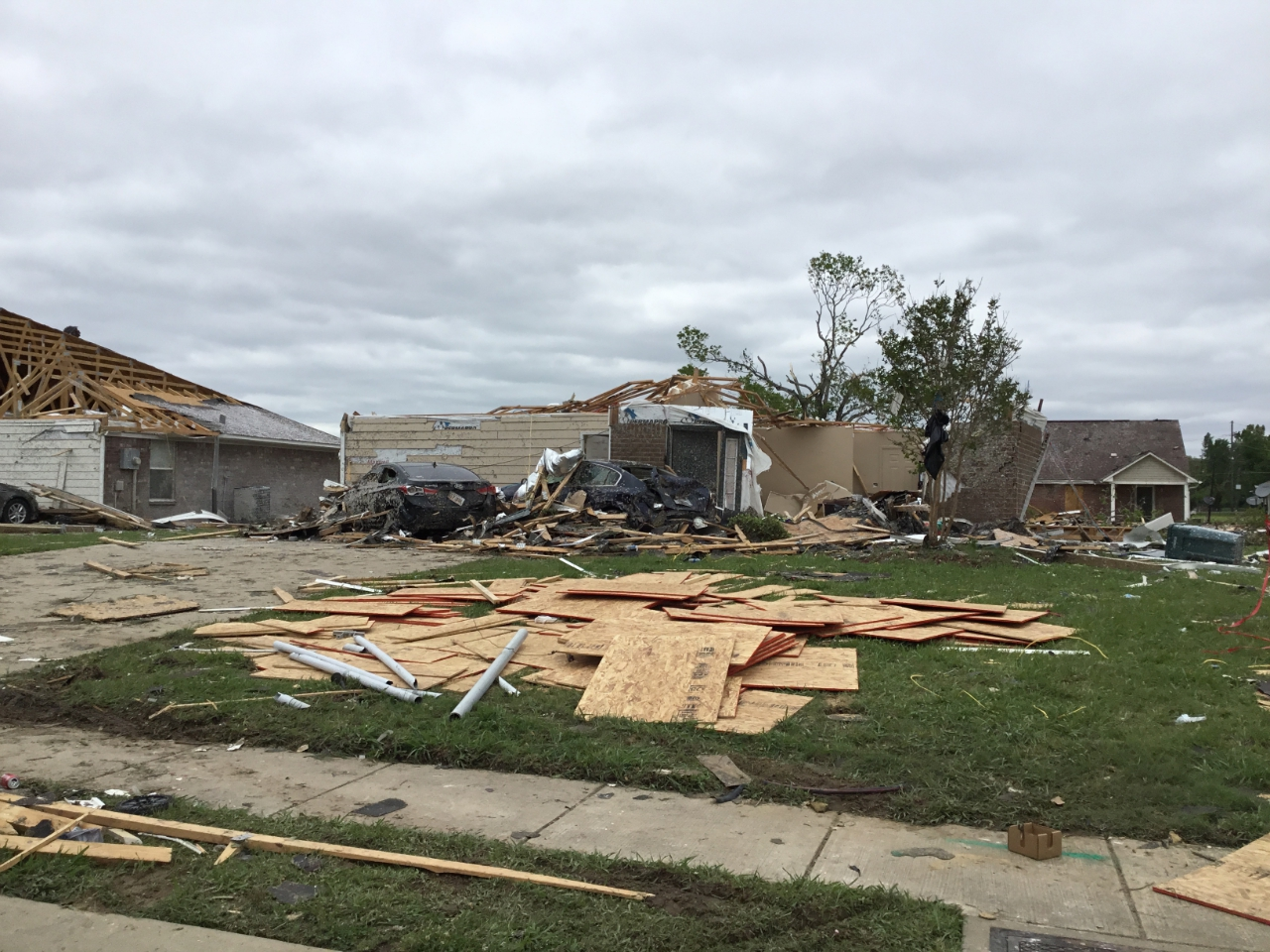
The tornado's effects in a residential home on Milhaven Road

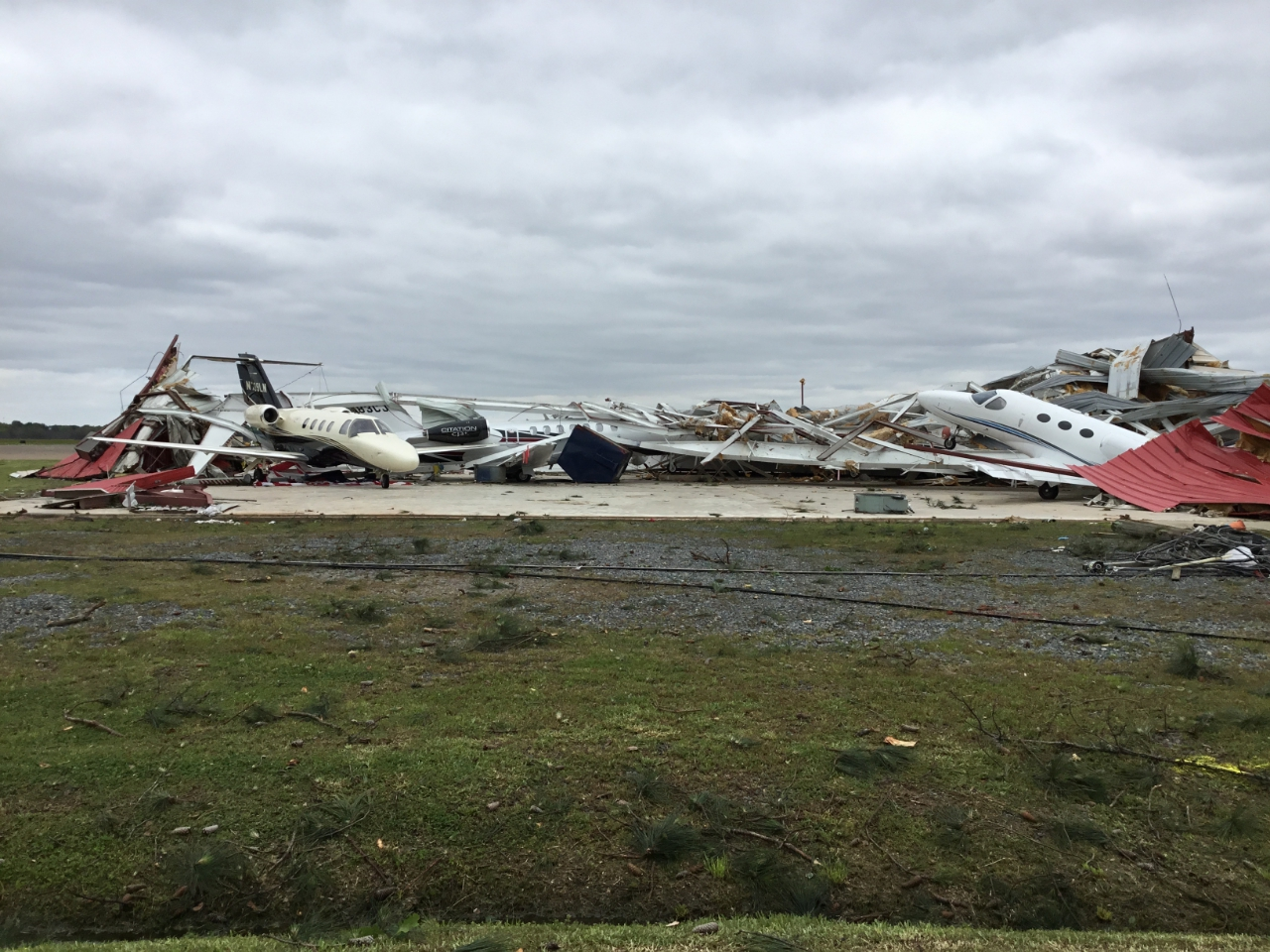
The tornado approached the Monroe Regional Airport, heavily damaging airplanes and completely destroying the hangar

Estimates from the Ouachita Parish Office of Homeland Security and Emergency Preparedness showed that a total of 458 homes were affected from a combination of at least two other tornadoes. From these, twenty-three homes were totally damaged, 108 had major damage, 243 had minor damage, and another 84 homes were barely affected. Of these, 20 houses were destroyed in Monroe's Sunflower Subdivision. Mayor Jamie Mayo gave an estimate of 200 to 300 houses destroyed, but no fatalities were reported. Seven distribution lines were damaged, with $25-30 million defaced from the airport alone, along with a few cancelled flights. An estimated 25,600 residents had no electricity with 260 poles, 600 spans of wire, and 75 transformers being damaged due to the tornado. Gas leaks were also reported in multiple neighborhoods.

== Aftermath and response ==
At 14:30 CST (19:30 UTC) on April 12, police officers and rescuers checked on resident's houses to see if they were okay, and the city secured two hundred hotel rooms to house the people that were affected by the severe weather. On Twitter, Mayo posted: "By the grace of God, early reports show only a few minor injuries. Pray for our city!" He announced that people should not touch the downed power lines, adding that they already had emergency aid. Louisiana governor John Bel Edwards published a statement on Twitter, stating: "The images and reports of major tornado damage in the Monroe area are heartbreaking, and my prayers are with the people there. We are in contact with local officials in the area to provide support."

== See also ==
- List of North American tornadoes and tornado outbreaks
- Tornadoes of 2020
