= Louisiana's 19th House of Representatives district =

American legislative district

Louisiana's 19th State House of Representatives district
Representative
Francis C. Thompson; R–Delhi

Louisiana's 19th House of Representatives district is one of 105 Louisiana House of Representatives districts. It is currently represented by Republican, and former Democrat Francis C. Thompson of Delhi, whose party switch gave the Republicans a supermajority in the house.

== Geography ==
HD19 includes the towns of Bonita, Delhi, Mer Rouge, Oak Ridge and Rayville.

== Election results ==
Year	Winning Candidate	Party	Percent	Opponent	Party	Percent
2011	Charles Chaney	Republican	100%			
2015	Charles Chaney	Republican	100%			
2019	Francis C. Thompson	Democratic	100%			
2023	Francis C. Thompson	Republican	77.9%	Norm Davis	Independent	22.1%
