= Louisiana's 34th State Senate district =

American legislative district

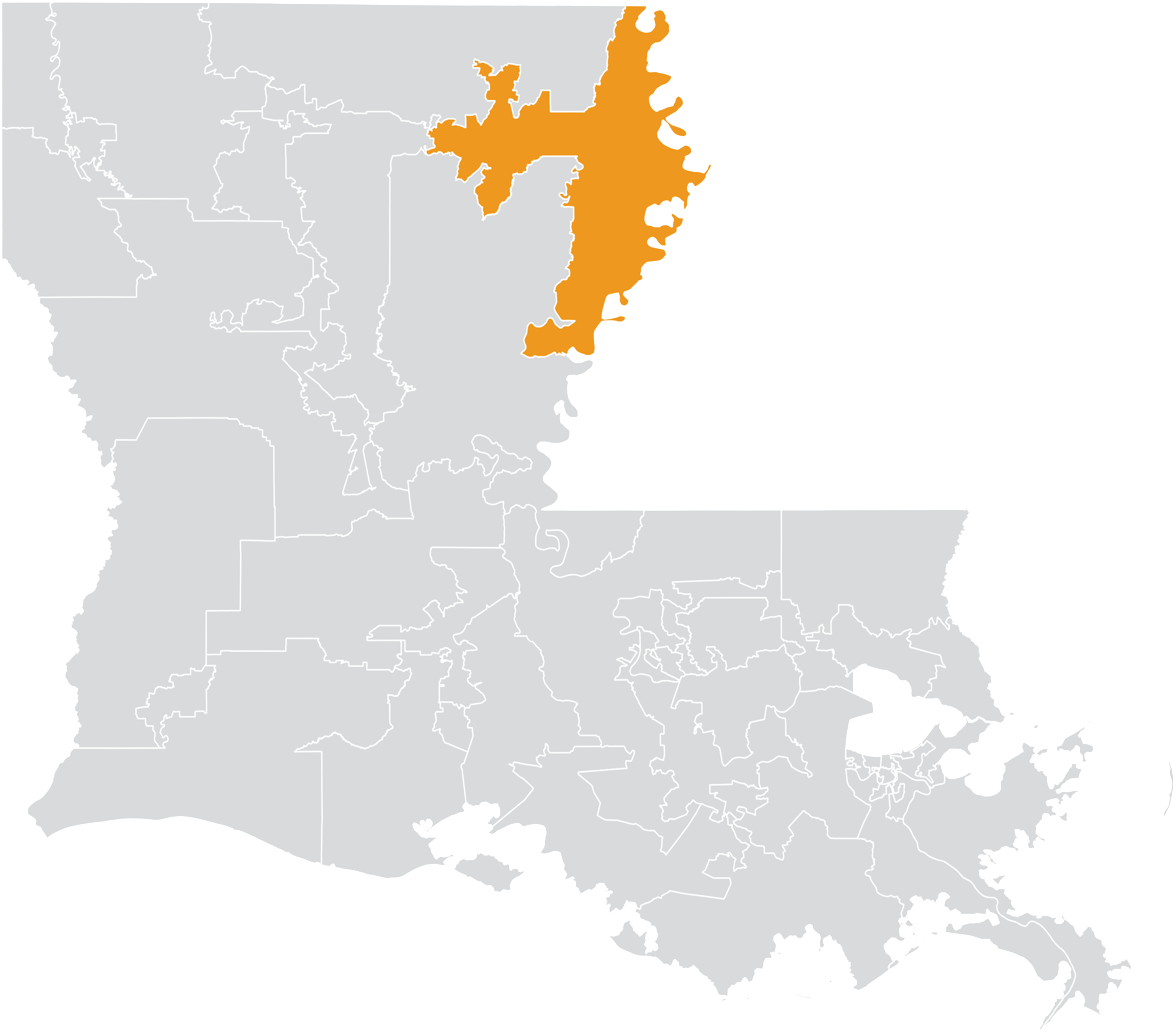
Senator
Katrina Jackson; D–Monroe
- Registration: 60.7% Democratic; 17.2% Republican; 22.1% No party preference
- Demographics: 30% White; 67% Black; 2% Hispanic; 1% Asian; 1% Other
- Population (2019): 110,461
- Registered voters: 72,427

Louisiana's 34th State Senate district is one of 39 districts in the Louisiana State Senate. It has been represented by Democrat Katrina Jackson since 2020.

== Geography ==
District 34 covers a majority-black swath of North Louisiana, including all of East Carroll, Madison Parishes, and Tensas Parishes, and parts of Concordia, Morehouse, Ouachita, Richland Parishes. The district covers some or all of the towns of Lake Providence, Tallulah, Ferriday, Delhi, Rayville, Bastrop, Monroe, and Richwood.

The district is located entirely within Louisiana's 5th congressional district, and overlaps with the 14th, 16th, 17th, 19th, 20th, and 21st districts of the Louisiana House of Representatives.

== Recent election results ==
Louisiana uses a jungle primary system. If no candidate receives 50% in the first round of voting, when all candidates appear on the same ballot regardless of party, the top-two finishers advance to a runoff election.

=== 2019 ===
2019 Louisiana State Senate election, District 34
Party	Candidate	Votes	%
Democratic	Katrina Jackson	Unopposed	100
Total votes		Unopposed	100
Democratic hold			

=== 2015 ===
2015 Louisiana State Senate election, District 34
Party	Candidate	Votes	%
Democratic	Francis C. Thompson (incumbent)	Unopposed	100
Total votes		Unopposed	100
Democratic hold			

=== 2011 ===
2011 Louisiana State Senate election, District 34
Party	Candidate	Votes	%
Democratic	Francis C. Thompson (incumbent)	Unopposed	100
Total votes		Unopposed	100
Democratic hold			

=== Federal and statewide results ===
Year	Office	Results
2020	President	Biden 65.9–32.6%
2019	Governor (runoff)	Edwards 71.8–28.2%
2016	President	Clinton 65.3–33.1%
2015	Governor (runoff)	Edwards 71.7–28.3%
2014	Senate (runoff)	Landrieu 67.3–32.7%
2012	President	Obama 68.3–31.0%
