= Pecanland Mall =

Coordinates: 32.498167°N 92.060324°W

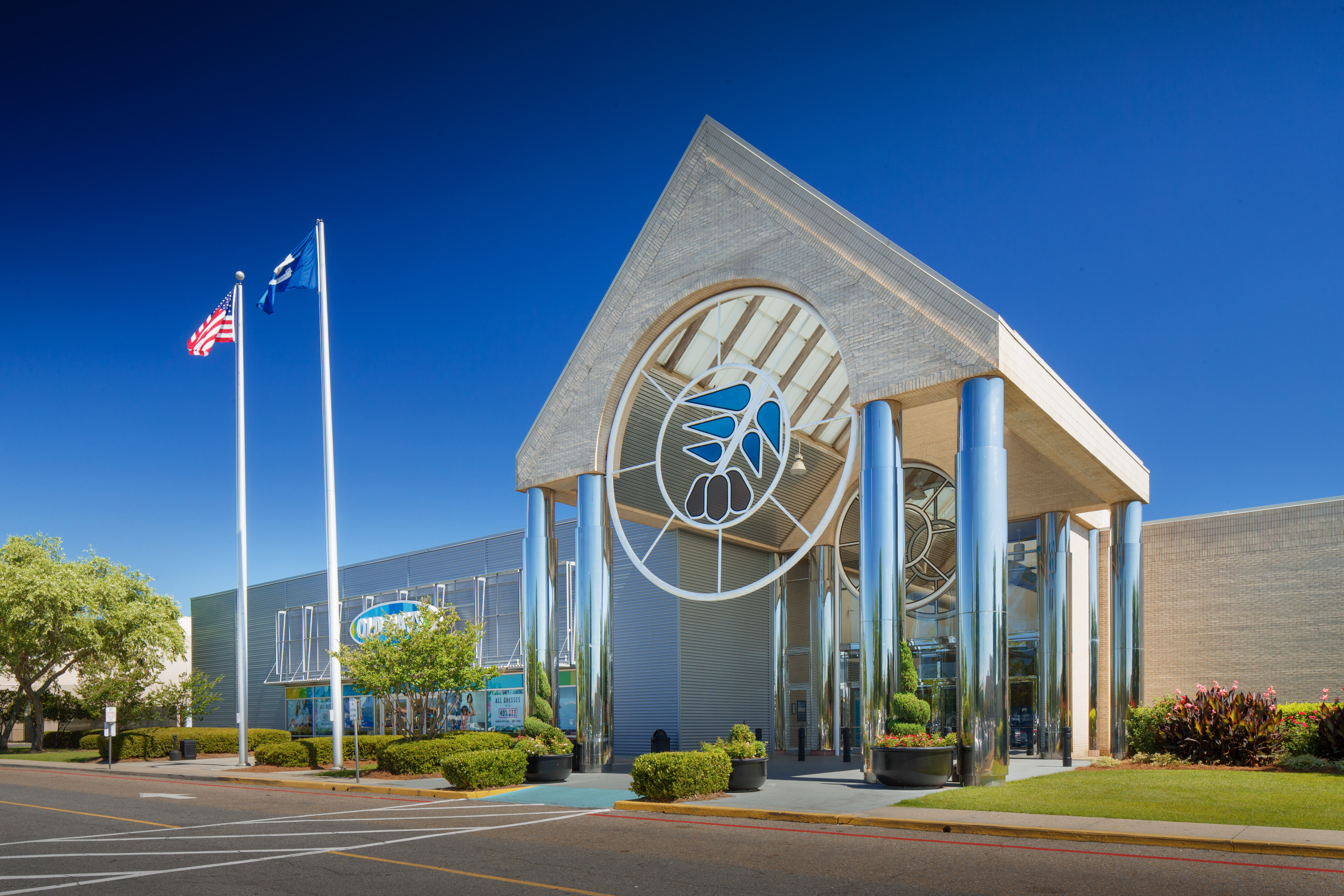
- Pecanland Mall south entrance
- Location: Monroe, Louisiana, United States
- Opened: July 24, 1985; 41 years ago
- Developer: Herring Marathon
- Manager: Spinoso Real Estate Group
- Owner: Kohan Retail Investment Group
- Num. of stores: 83
- Num. of anchor tenants: 7 (6 open, 1 vacant)
- Floor area: 964,123 square feet (89,570 m^{2})
- Floors: 1 (2 in JCPenney and Dillard's)
- Website: www.pecanlandmall.com

Pecanland Mall is an enclosed shopping mall in Monroe, Louisiana, United States. The mall was named Pecanland because the land on which the mall is located was formerly a pecan farm. The mall is on Interstate 20 near U.S. Highway 165, the two major highways in the area.

Pecanland Mall has 6 anchor stores: Belk, Tilt Studio, Dillard's, Dick's Sporting Goods, and JCPenney. The mall also features a 450-seat food court and 10-screen cinema.

== History ==
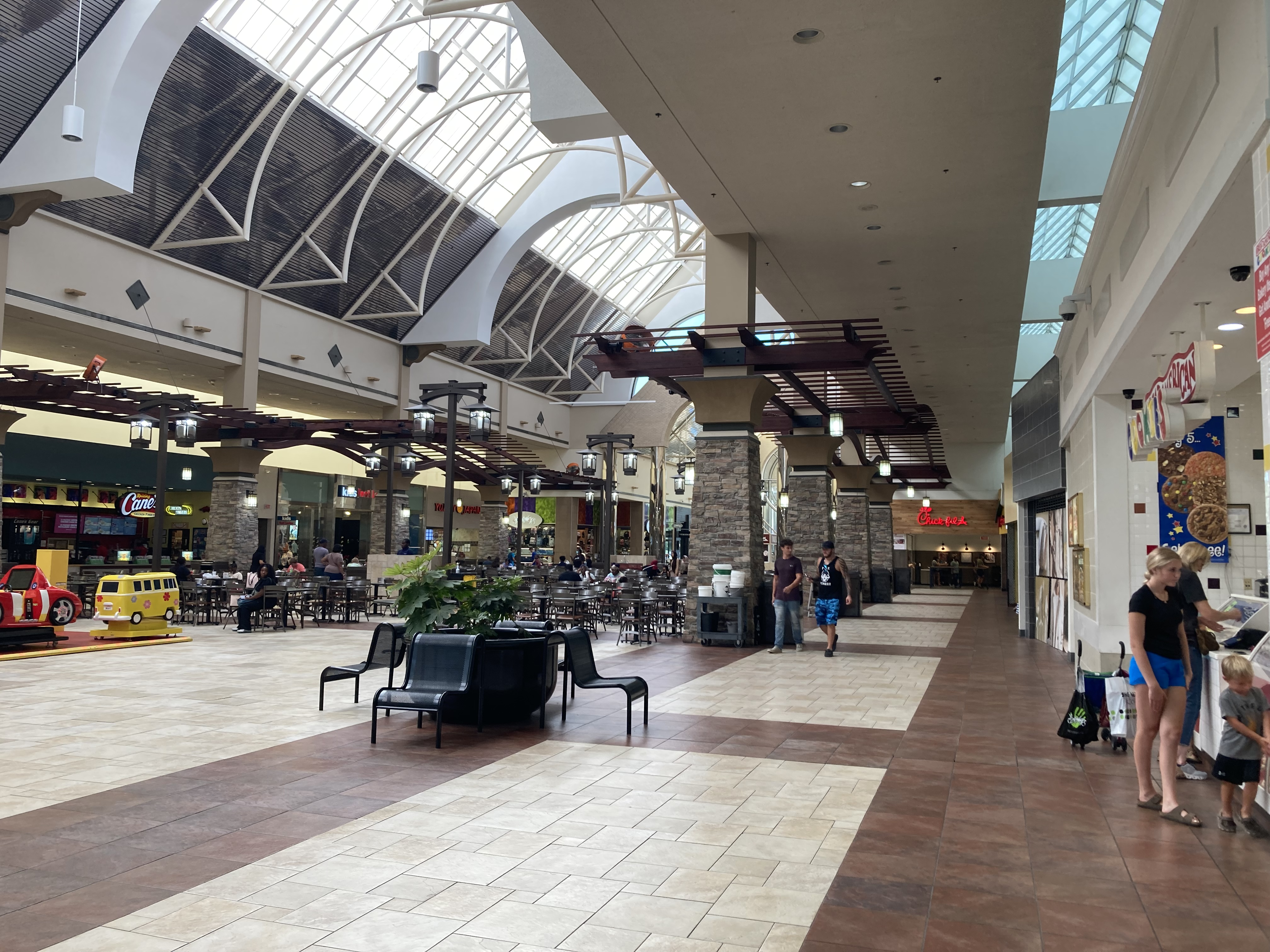
Food court area inside the mall

The mall opened on July 24, 1985.

In 2002, General Growth Properties acquired the mall for $72 million. Mervyn's, an original tenant, closed on January 21, 2006, and became Burlington one year later, but closed by the late-2010s.

In October 2012, Dick's Sporting Goods opened at the mall.

In September 2018, Sears closed its location at the mall.

In March 2019, Nickels and Dimes Inc of Celina Texas announced that Tilt Studio would open up at the mall in the former Mervyn's/Burlington. This marked Tilt's return to the mall, as its parent company originally operated Tilt Arcade at the Food Court in the late 1980s to 2012. On August 12, 2020, Stein Mart filed for Chapter 11 bankruptcy due to the COVID-19 pandemic. Later, it was announced that all Stein Mart locations would be closing permanently.

The mall was purchased by Kohan Retail Investment Group in May 2026. Local media reports claim that at other malls, Kohan consistently pays property taxes, bills and employees late. In addition to late pay, employees at Pecanland Mall further claim that there are at least 30 leaks in the roof, rats, no working air conditioning and broken security equipment.
