= Adrian Fisher (Louisiana politician) =

American politician

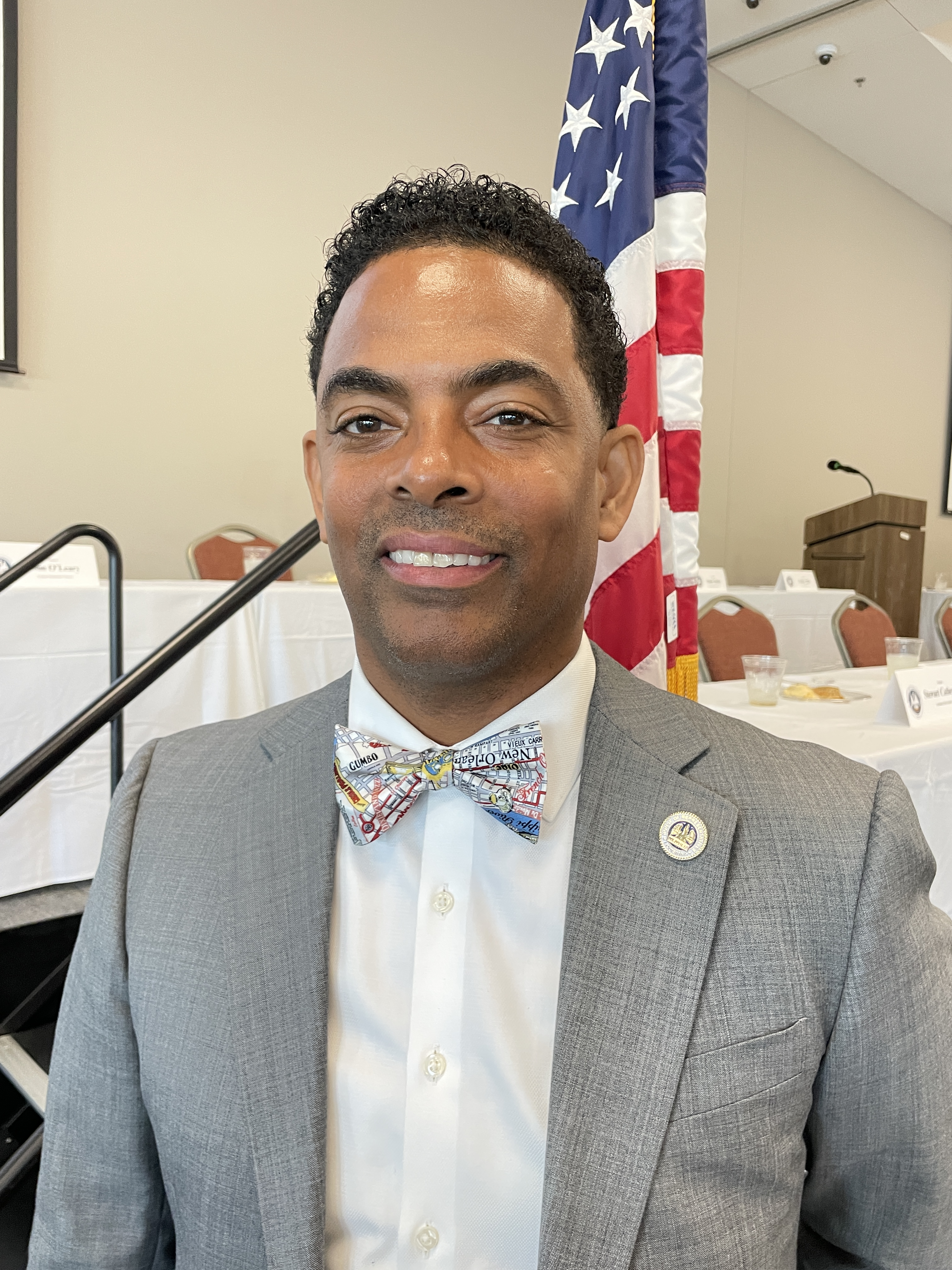

Member of the Louisiana House of Representatives from the 16th district
- Incumbent
- Assumed office December 6, 2021
- Preceded by: Frederick D. Jones

Personal details
- Party: Democratic
- Education: Southern University (BS); University of Louisiana at Monroe (MS)

Adrian Fisher is an American politician, businessman, and pastor serving as a member of the Louisiana House of Representatives from the 16th district. He assumed office on December 6, 2021. He represents parts of Morehouse and Ouachita parishes and lists his occupation as business owner of Cognitive Development Centers.

== Early life and career ==
Fisher is a licensed counselor and business owner in Monroe; the Louisiana Department of Health lists him as director of the Cognitive Development Center, an outpatient behavioral-health provider. He is also a pastor and co-founder (with LaTondra Fisher) of Living Water Ministries International in Monroe (established 2009).

== Education ==
Fisher earned a Bachelor of Science degree in accounting from Southern University and a Master of Science in community counseling from the University of Louisiana at Monroe.

== Career ==
Adrian Fisher represents Louisiana House District 16, which includes parts of Monroe and Bastrop and nearby communities in Ouachita and Morehouse parishes.Outside of politics, Fisher is a licensed counselor and operates a behavioral health business. He was elected to the Louisiana House of Representatives in November 2021 and assumed office on December 6, 2021.

== Elections ==
=== 2021 special ===
Fisher won the November 13, 2021, special primary for House District 16 with 69.3% (2,431) against Alicia Calvin (19.8%) and Charles Bradford (10.9%).

=== 2023 ===
Fisher was re-elected in 2023; the primary was canceled and he was declared elected without opposition under Louisiana’s majority-vote system.

== Committee assignments ==
For the 2024–2028 term, Fisher serves on:

- Agriculture, Forestry, Aquaculture, and Rural Development
- Appropriations
- Health and Welfare
- Joint Legislative Committee on the Budget
- House Select Committee on Homeland Security

== Legislation ==
In 2025, Fisher authored the Mental Health Assessments in Schools Act (HB 486), requiring each public school to make a mental-health assessment available to students in grades 3–12 at the start of each school year; it became law as Act 504 without the governor’s signature.

In 2024, Fisher sponsored HB 939 to expand Medicaid coverage and remote monitoring services for patients with sickle-cell disease; the bill passed the House and was referred to the Senate Health and Welfare Committee.
