= Francis C. Thompson =

American politician and educator (born 1941)

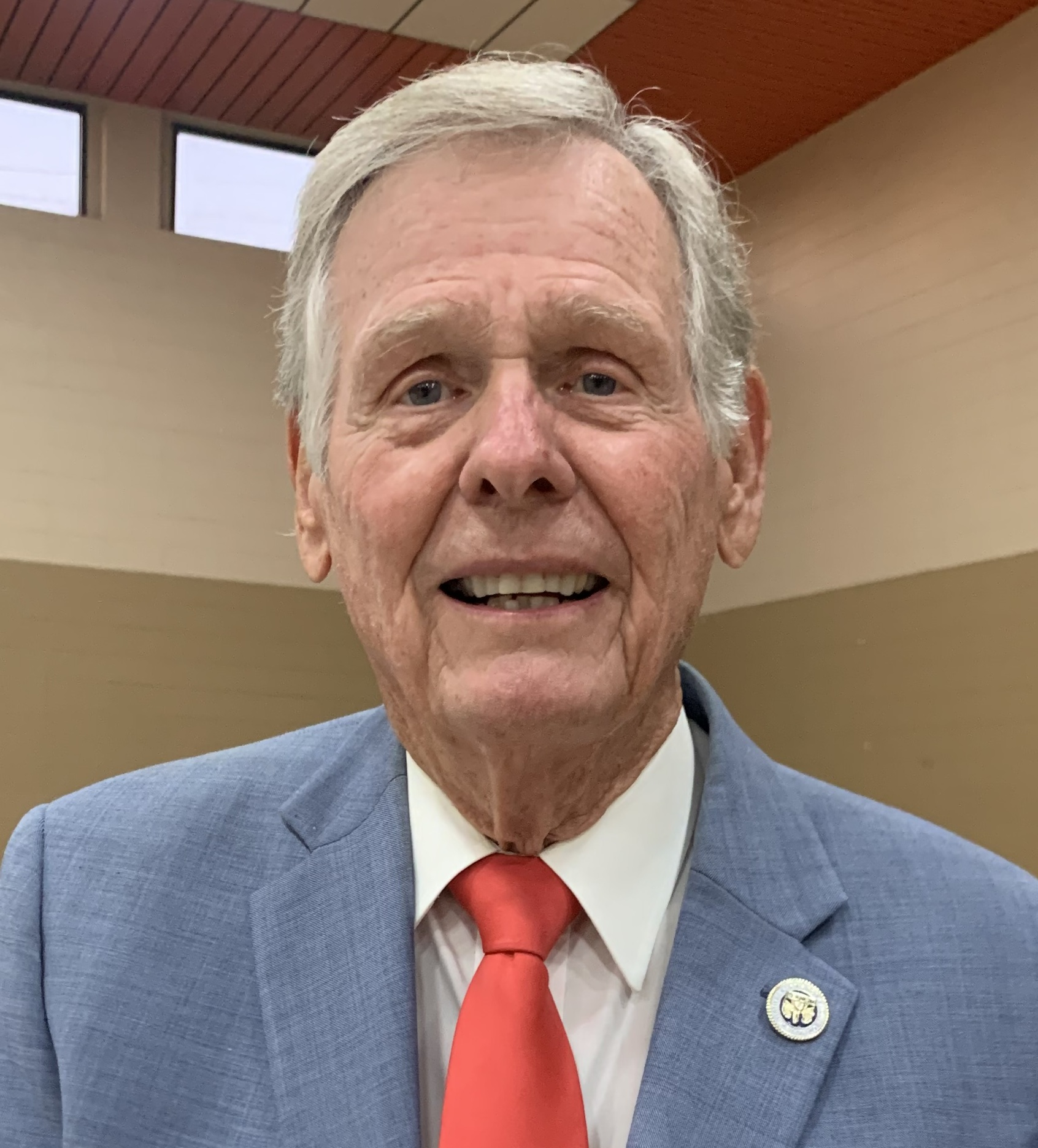

Member of the Louisiana House of Representatives from the 19th district
- Incumbent
- Assumed office January 13, 2020
- Preceded by: Bubba Chaney
- In office January 13, 1975 – January 14, 2008
- Succeeded by: Bubba Chaney

Member of the Louisiana State Senate from the 34th district
- In office January 14, 2008 – January 13, 2020
- Preceded by: Charles D. Jones
- Succeeded by: Katrina Jackson

Personal details
- Born: October 29, 1941 (age 84) Delhi, Louisiana, U.S.
- Party: Republican (2023–present); Democratic (1975–2023)
- Spouse: Marilyn Thompson
- Education: Louisiana Tech University (BS, MS); Northeast Louisiana University (MEd, EdD)
- Occupation: Retired college professor

Francis C. Thompson (born October 29, 1941) is an American educator and politician who has represented District 19 in the Louisiana House of Representatives since 2020. He previously represented the district from 1975 until 2008 and represented District 34 in the Louisiana State Senate from 2008 until 2020.

Thompson was elected to the Legislature as a Democrat but joined the Republican Party in March 2023 after nearly 48 years as a Democratic legislator. He became the longest-serving state legislator in Louisiana history in January 2023.

== Early life and career ==
Thompson was born in Delhi, Louisiana. He earned bachelor's and master's degrees from Louisiana Tech University and later received a Master of Education and Doctor of Education from Northeast Louisiana University, now the University of Louisiana at Monroe.

Before and during his political career, Thompson worked as a teacher, a vice president of a manufacturing company and an assistant professor at Northeast Louisiana University. He served on the Richland Parish School Board from 1968 until 1975.

== Political career ==
Thompson was first elected to District 19 in the Louisiana House of Representatives in 1975. He remained in the House until term limits prevented him from seeking another consecutive term in 2007.

In 1996, Thompson ran for the United States House of Representatives in Louisiana's 5th congressional district. He advanced to the runoff but was defeated by Republican John Cooksey.

Thompson was elected to the Louisiana State Senate in 2007 and represented District 34 from January 2008 until January 2020. After completing three Senate terms, he returned to his former House district, winning the seat without opposition in 2019.

On March 17, 2023, Thompson announced that he had changed his party registration from Democratic to Republican. He said Democratic leaders had promoted positions that did “not align with those values and principles that are part of my Christian life.” His change gave Republicans a two-thirds supermajority in both chambers of the Louisiana Legislature for the first time.

Thompson was reelected as a Republican in 2023 to serve during the Legislature's 2024–2028 term. As of 2026, his House district includes portions of East Carroll, Madison, Morehouse, Richland and West Carroll parishes.

== Recognition ==
Thompson was inducted into the Louisiana Political Museum and Hall of Fame in 2005.

In 2022, the Southern Regional Education Board presented Thompson with its Jack Hill Champion of Education Award for his work in education policy and regional cooperation. Thompson joined the board in 1980 and served on several of its commissions and advisory bodies.
