= Monroe Regional Airport (Louisiana) =

Airport in Ouachita Parish

- USGS 1998 orthophoto
- IATA: MLU; ICAO: KMLU; FAA LID: MLU

Summary
- Airport type: Public
- Owner: City of Monroe
- Serves: Monroe, Louisiana
- Elevation AMSL: 79 ft (24 m)
- Coordinates: 32°30′39″N 92°02′16″W
- Website: www.FlyMonroe.org

Map
- Location of airport in Louisiana MLU (the United States)

Runways
Direction	Length		Surface
Direction	ft	m	Surface
4/22	7,504	2,287	Asphalt
14/32	6,301	1,921	Asphalt

Statistics (2021)
- Aircraft operations: 35,781
- Based aircraft: 50
- Source: Federal Aviation Administration

Monroe Regional Airport (IATA: MLU, ICAO: KMLU, FAA LID: MLU) is a public use airport in Ouachita Parish, Louisiana, United States. The airport is owned by the City of Monroe and is located within the city limits three nautical miles (6 km) east of its central business district.

It is included in the National Plan of Integrated Airport Systems for 2011–2015, which categorized it as a primary commercial service airport since it has over 10,000 passenger boardings (enplanements) per year. As per Federal Aviation Administration records, the airport had 107,290 enplanements in calendar year 2011, an increase of 6.8% from 100,419 in 2010.

The airport is advertised as the birthplace of Delta Air Lines; the airport's logo is a variant on the Delta logo.

== History ==
During World War II, the United States Army Air Forces Flying Training Command used the airport as a cadet training center beginning in August 1942. The airfield was named Selman Army Airfield, named after a Navy Pilot, Lieutenant Augustus J. Selman, USN, a native of Monroe, Louisiana, who died in the line of duty at Norfolk, Virginia, on November 28, 1921, of injuries received in an airplane crash.

The vast majority of aircraft flown at Selman AAF were Beech C-45s, also known as the AT-7. BT-13s were flown for basic flying training, and TC-47 and TC-46s were used beginning in late 1944. It closed on until September 1, 1945. After that Selman AAF was used as a separation center for returning overseas personnel until being inactivated on May 31, 1946. The airport was returned to civil control on July 31, 1946.

Monroe was served in the past by several airlines operating mainline jet aircraft. Delta Air Lines operated Boeing 727-200, Boeing 737-200, McDonnell Douglas DC-9-30 and McDonnell Douglas MD-80 jetliner flights to Atlanta, Dallas/Fort Worth, Birmingham, AL and other cities including one stop, no change of plane, direct service to New York City via Newark Airport. Delta operated mainline jet service into Monroe for many years.

Southern Airways served Monroe with Douglas DC-9-10 jet flights to New Orleans, Baton Rouge, Memphis, Chicago, Orlando and other destinations. Southern then merged with North Central Airlines to form Republic Airlines which in turn continued to serve Monroe. Republic operated DC-9 jet service nonstop to Memphis and New Orleans with direct, one stop service to Chicago and also direct, no change of plane, two stop service to Atlanta. Republic was subsequently acquired by Northwest Airlines which in turn then merged with Delta.

In addition, Texas International Airlines (formerly known as Trans-Texas Airways, TTa) operated Convair 600 turboprop service to Houston, Beaumont/Port Arthur, TX and other destinations.

Several regional and commuter airlines served Monroe in the past as well including Royale Airlines which was based in nearby Shreveport and operated hubs at Houston Intercontinental Airport (IAH) and New Orleans International Airport (MSY). Royale operated Grumman Gulfstream I, Beechcraft C99 and Embraer EMB-110 Bandeirante turboprop aircraft from the airport with nonstop service to Alexandria, LA; Baton Rouge, LA; Memphis, TN; New Orleans, LA and Shreveport, LA as well as one stop, direct service to Houston, TX. L'Express Airlines, another Louisiana-based air carrier, operated Beechcraft turboprop aircraft with nonstop flights to its hub in New Orleans, LA. Northwest Airlink, which was operated by Express Airlines I on behalf of Northwest Airlines, flew Saab 340 and British Aerospace BAe Jetstream 31 turboprops to Memphis.

Currently, all American Eagle, Delta Connection and United Express passenger flights to and from Monroe are operated either with Canadair CRJ or with Embraer ERJ regional jet aircraft.

== Facilities and aircraft ==
Monroe Regional Airport covers an area of 2,660 acres (1,076 ha) at an elevation of 79 feet (24 m) above mean sea level. It has two runways with asphalt surfaces: 4/22 is 7,504 by 150 feet (2,287 x 46 m); and 14/32 is 6,301 by 150 feet (1,921 x 46 m).

For the 12-month period ending December 31, 2021, the airport had 35,781 aircraft operations, an average of 98 per day: 63% general aviation, 20% military, 17% air taxi, and <1% scheduled commercial. At that time there were 50 aircraft based at this airport: 35 single-engine, 8 multi-engine, 6 jet, and 1 helicopter.

== Terminal ==
In 2009 Lincoln Builders of Ruston started construction on a new nearly 60,000-square-foot (5,600 m^{2}) terminal, which was completed in mid-2011.

In October 2011, part one of a two phase passenger terminal project was completed. The original terminal was demolished and a new passenger terminal was constructed to include a new baggage claim and car rental facility. The new terminal is located adjacent to the site of the original facility and features new ticket counters, a cocktail lounge and a restaurant that serves breakfast, lunch, and dinner. The new terminal has six gates with four of these gates being equipped with jet bridges.

== Airlines and destinations ==
Delta Air Lines and American Airlines provide scheduled commercial service at Monroe Regional Airport, with flights to Atlanta and Dallas, and the airport has experienced three consecutive years of passenger growth, handling 191,874 passengers in 2023, 204,294 in 2024, and 216,481 through November 2025.

Airlines	Destinations
American Eagle	Dallas/Fort Worth
Delta Connection	Atlanta

Destinations map
Destinations from Monroe Regional Airport
Red = Year-round destination

== Cargo airlines ==
The following airlines offer scheduled cargo service:

Airlines	Destinations
FedEx Feeder operated by Baron Aviation	Memphis

== Statistics ==
Carrier shares for MLU (August 2025 – July 2026)
Carrier	Passengers (arriving and departing)
Endeavor Air	122,000(49.95%)
Envoy Air	113,000(46.33%)
SkyWest	9,080(3.72%)

Top domestic destinations for MLU (August 2025 – July 2026)
Rank	Airport	Passengers	Airline
1	Dallas/Fort Worth, Texas	62,370	American
2	Atlanta, Georgia	61,010	Delta

== See also ==
- Chennault Aviation and Military Museum
- List of airports in Louisiana
