= Bubba Chaney =

American politician (born 1946)

Louisiana State Representative from District 19 (all or parts of East Carroll, Madison, Morehouse, Ouachita, Richland, and West Carroll parishes in northeastern Louisiana)
- In office 2008–2020
- Preceded by: Francis C. Thompson
- Succeeded by: Francis C. Thompson

Personal details
- Born: Charles R. "Bubba" Chaney; September 23, 1946 (age 80)
- Party: Democratic (until 2011); Republican (2011-present)
- Spouse: Sharon Crawford Chaney
- Education: Louisiana State University
- Occupation: Businessman

Charles R. "Bubba" Chaney (born September 23, 1946) is a former member of the Louisiana House of Representatives for District 19, which includes his home city of Rayville in Richland Parish in northeastern Louisiana.

A graduate of Louisiana State University in Baton Rouge, Chaney is the owner and manager of Albert's Men's Wear in Rayville. He is married to the former Sharon Crawford.

On February 7, 2011, Chaney made headlines by vaulting from the Democrats to the Republicans. His switch was notable because it gave the GOP its first majority in the Louisiana House of Representatives since Reconstruction. In the nonpartisan blanket primary held on October 22, 2011, Chaney was unopposed for his second term in the House.

== Legislative record ==
Chaney is a former member of the Louisiana House Committee on Education. In 2010, he sponsored legislation to broaden the approval process for textbooks in public schools. This action brought him into opposition from the conservative Louisiana Family Forum, which Chaney said "absolutely ambushed" him. Chaney's score from the Louisiana Family Forum was 56 percent in 2008 and 78 percent in 2009. As of 2015, he was a member of the House committees on (1) Agriculture, (2) Appropriations, (3) Budget, and (4) Natural Resources and Environment.

Chaney ran unopposed in the October 24, 2015, primary election.

Due to term limits, Chaney was ineligible to run for re-election in the nonpartisan blanket primary held on October 12, 2019. Instead, his predecessor in the House, term-limited State Senator Francis C. Thompson, announced his candidacy to reclaim the seat. Thompson had previously served in the House from 1975 to 2008.

== Notes ==
Louisiana House of Representatives
Preceded by Francis C. Thompson	Louisiana State Representative from District 19; Charles R. "Bubba" Chaney; 2008–2020	Succeeded by Francis C. Thompson
