= Louisiana Delta Community College =

Public college in Monroe, Louisiana, US

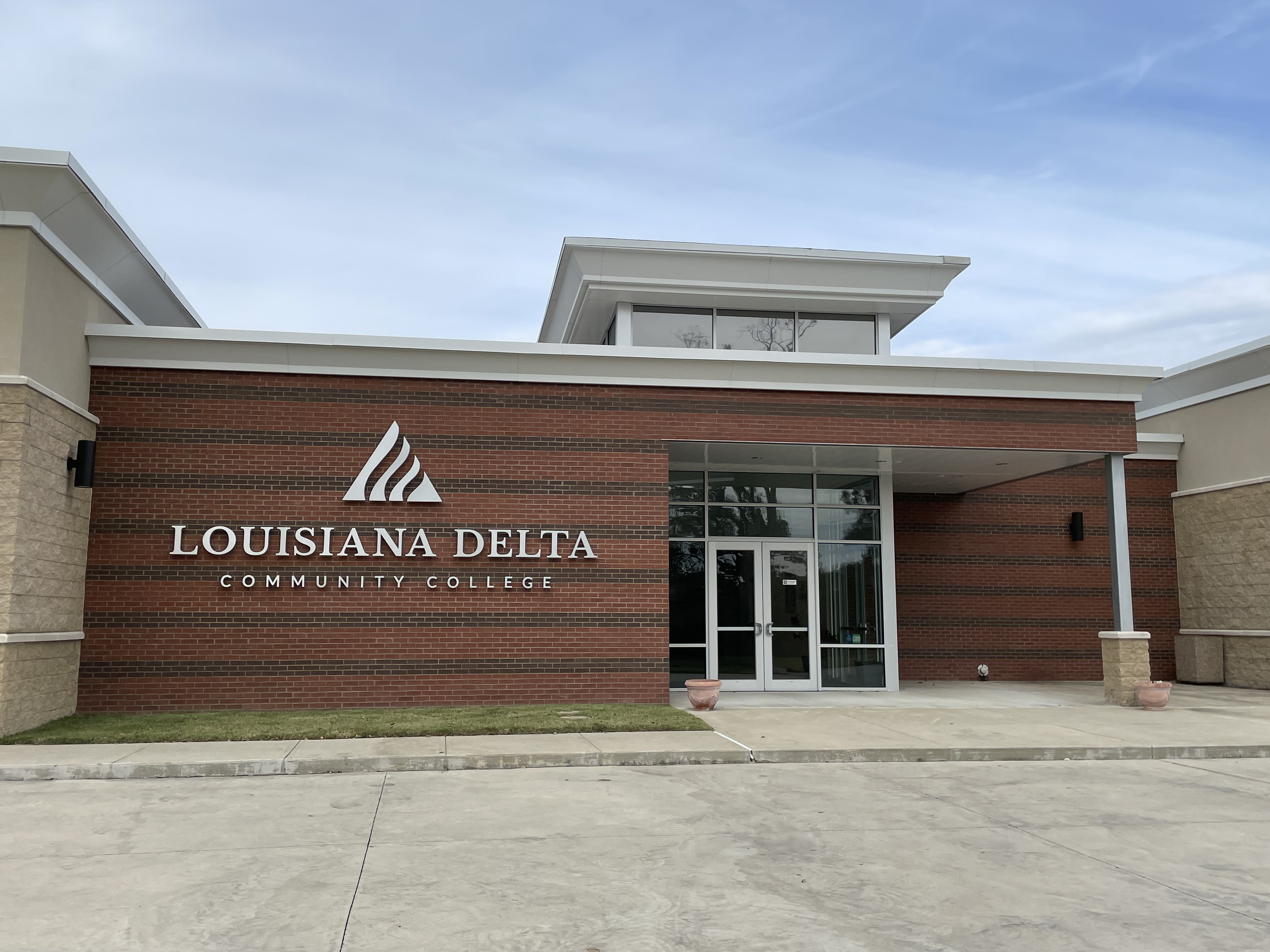
- Louisiana Delta Community College campus in Tallulah
- Type: Public community college
- Established: 2001 (25 years ago)
- Chancellor: Randall Esters
- Students: 3,956
- Location: Monroe, Louisiana, United States
- Mascot: Knights
- Website: www.ladelta.edu

Louisiana Delta Community College is a public community college in Monroe, Louisiana.

The college began offering classes in 2001. Louisiana Delta Community College has eight campuses (Bastrop, Jonesboro, Lake Providence, Monroe, West Monroe, Winnsboro, Ruston, Tallulah) throughout northeast Louisiana. The college offers associate degrees, technical diplomas, professional certifications, and dual enrollment for high school students.
