= Katrina Jackson =

American politician

Katrina Jackson-Andrews
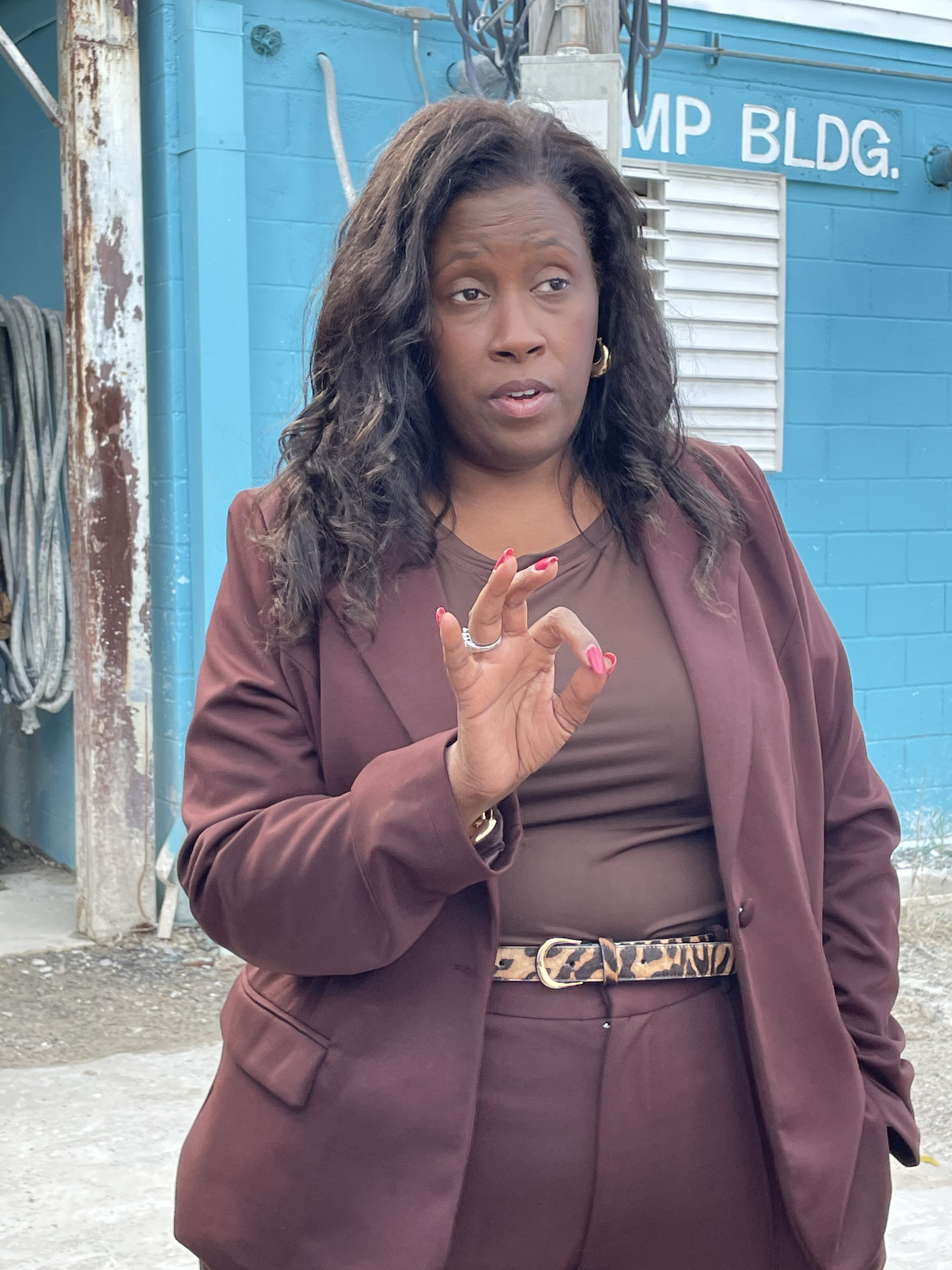

Member of the Louisiana Senate from the 34th district
- Incumbent
- Assumed office January 13, 2020
- Preceded by: Francis Thompson

Member of the Louisiana House of Representatives from the 16th district
- In office January 2012 – January 2020
- Preceded by: Kay Katz
- Succeeded by: Frederick Jones

Personal details
- Born: July 1977 (age 49) Monroe, Louisiana, U.S.
- Party: Democratic
- Spouse: Samuel M. Andrews (m. 2023)
- Education: University of Louisiana, Monroe (BA); Southern University (JD)

Katrina Renee Jackson-Andrews (born July 1977) is an American attorney and politician from Monroe, Louisiana, who is a Democratic member of the Louisiana State Senate for the 34th district, serving since 2020. From 2012 until 2020, Jackson served in the Louisiana House of Representatives for the 16th district, which includes Morehouse and Ouachita parishes.

== Education ==
Jackson earned a bachelor's degree from the University of Louisiana at Monroe and a Juris Doctor from the Southern University Law Center in Baton Rouge.

== Political career ==
=== Louisiana House of Representatives ===
Jackson was elected to House District 16 in 2011 and served from 2012 to 2020. During her House tenure she served on Agriculture, Forestry, Aquaculture and Rural Development; Commerce; Health and Welfare; Appropriations (ad hoc); Joint Legislative Committee on the Budget (ad hoc); and House and Governmental Affairs (interim). She also served two terms as chair of the Louisiana Legislative Black Caucus and was active in the Women’s and Rural caucuses.

=== Louisiana State Senate ===
Jackson has represented Senate District 34 since January 13, 2020; she was elected unopposed to succeed term-limited Democratic lawmaker Francis C. Thompson in the October 12, 2019 nonpartisan blanket primary. She won re-election outright in the October 14, 2023 primary. District 34 includes parts of Concordia, East Carroll, Madison, Morehouse, Ouachita, Richland and Tensas parishes.

For the 2024–2028 term, she serves as chair of the Senate Select Committee on Women and Children and vice chair of the Senate Health and Welfare Committee; she is also a member of Agriculture, Forestry, Aquaculture and Rural Development; Education; Finance; and the Joint Legislative Committee on the Budget.

=== Abortion legislation and activism ===
In 2014, Jackson, who unlike most national Democrats opposes abortion, authored House Bill 388, which would require abortion providers to have admitting privileges with a hospital near their clinics. The law was approved in the House with only five dissenters. If passed, it would reportedly have resulted in three of the state's five abortion clinics closing immediately. The bill was argued to be unconstitutional under the precedent set by Whole Woman's Health v. Hellerstedt, and was struck down as such by the Supreme Court of the United States in June Medical Services, LLC v. Russo in June 2020.

In 2022, Jackson authored SB 342 (Act 545), which amended Louisiana’s trigger laws by increasing criminal penalties for abortion providers to one–ten years’ imprisonment and fines of $10,000–$100,000, and by defining pregnancy as beginning at implantation. The statute includes exceptions for ectopic and medically futile pregnancies but not for rape or incest.

On January 22, 2016, Jackson was a guest speaker at the March for Life in Washington, D.C.

=== Social media litigation ===
In 2023, several individuals claimed that Jackson had blocked them on Twitter due to their criticism of her. They filed a lawsuit, asserting that she had violated their First Amendment rights as an elected public official. Jackson argued that one user had engaged in "hate speech", which is not protected by the First Amendment. The other critics contended that they had not resorted to personal attacks or profanity. In her response, Jackson stated, "People who are blocked should send me an email, and we’ll consider whether they should be unblocked".

On August 19, 2025, U.S. District Judge Donald Walter dismissed the case (Detiege v. Jackson, No. 3:23-cv-00175, W.D. La.), holding that Jackson’s posts from her account did not constitute state action under Lindke v. Freed and thus did not violate plaintiffs’ First Amendment rights.
