= Monroe, Louisiana =

- City
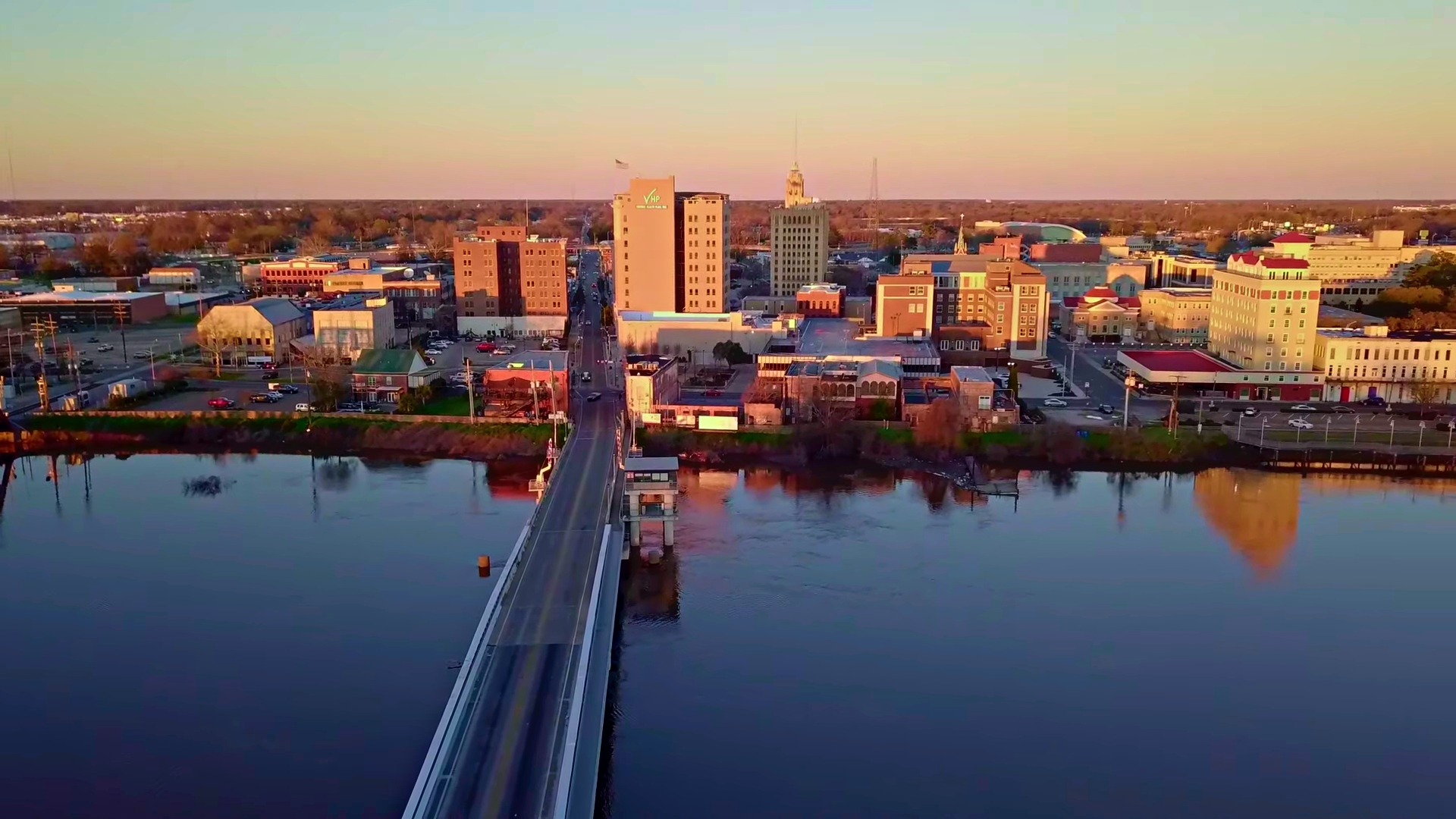
- Downtown Monroe

- Seal
- Nickname: Twin Cities of Northeast Louisiana (along with West Monroe)
- Motto: "Oneroe"
- Location of Monroe in Ouachita Parish, Louisiana

- Location in the United States
- Coordinates: 32°30′34″N 92°07′06″W
- Country: United States
- State: Louisiana
- Parish: Ouachita
- Founded: 1785 (241 years ago)
- Incorporated (town): 1845 (181 years ago)
- Incorporated (city): 1906 (120 years ago)
- Named for: the steamboat James Monroe

Government
  - Mayor: Friday Ellis (I)
  - City Council: Members List: President of the Council: Doug Harvey; Clerk: Carolus Riley; Dist 1: Doug Harvey; Dist 2: Gretchen Ezernack; Dist 3: Juanita G. Woods; Dist 4: Bishop Rodney McFarland; Dist 5: Verbon R. Muhammad; City Attorney: Angie Sturdivant

Area
  - City: 32.91 sq mi (85.23 km^{2})
  - Land: 29.65 sq mi (76.80 km^{2})
  - Water: 3.25 sq mi (8.42 km^{2})
- Elevation: 72 ft (22 m)

Population (2020)
  - City: 47,702
  - Estimate (2023): 46,616
  - Rank: US: 857th LA: 8th
  - Density: 1,608.6/sq mi (621.08/km^{2})
  - Urban: 119,964 (US: 280th)
  - Metro: 222,695 (US: 212th)
- Urban area includes Monroe-West Monroe
- Demonym: Monroyan
- Time zone: UTC−6 (Central (CST))
  - Summer (DST): UTC−5 (CDT)
- ZIP codes: 71201, 71202, 71203, 71207, 71209, 71210, 71211, 71212, 71213, 71217
- Area code: 318
- FIPS code: 22-51410
- GNIS feature ID: 2404283
- Sales tax: 10.44%
- Website: monroela.us

Monroe is the ninth-largest city in the U.S. state of Louisiana, and is the parish seat and largest city of Ouachita Parish. With a 2020 census-tabulated population of 47,702, it is the principal city of the Monroe metropolitan statistical area, the second-largest metropolitan area in North Louisiana.

== Etymology ==
As governor of Louisiana, Esteban Rodríguez Miró had Fort Miro built in 1791. Fort Miro changed its name to Monroe to commemorate the first arrival of the steamboat James Monroe in the spring of 1820. The ship's arrival was the single event, in the minds of local residents, that transformed the outpost into a town.

Credit for the name is indirectly given to James Monroe of Virginia, the fifth President of the United States, for whom the ship was named. The steamboat is depicted in a mural at the main branch of the Ouachita Parish Public Library.

== History ==
=== Early history–late 20th century ===
Monroe's origins date back to the Spanish colonial period.

As the 19th century began, the entire Ouachita Valley region ... was part of Spanish colonial holdings. Ouachita Parish encompassed the area between the Red and the Mississippi Rivers, from north of Concordia and Rapides Parish to the Missouri. The area was sparsely populated, primarily by itinerant hunters and trappers until late in the 18th century. Under Spanish colonial rule, Jean Baptiste Filhiol was sent from South Louisiana to oversee the settlement of the Poste du Ouachita in 1781. In 1785 Filhiol designated Prairie des Canots, now Monroe ... as the governmental center of the Poste du Ouachita. In response to a petition by the settlers, a fortification was built in 1791 and named Fort Miro in honor of the Spanish governor, Estavan Miro.

— Susan Sirmans, Pharmacy and Medicine in Nineteenth-Century Ouachita Parish, Louisiana

Fort Miro changed its name to Monroe to commemorate the first arrival of the steamboat James Monroe in the spring of 1820 (see "Etymology" above).

In 1913, Joseph A. Biedenharn, the first bottler of Coca-Cola, moved to Monroe from Vicksburg, Mississippi. Biedenharn and his son Malcolm were among the founders of Delta Air Lines, originally Delta Dusters. That company was founded in Tallulah, Louisiana in Madison Parish. It was based on products and processes developed by the Agriculture Experimental Station to dust crops from airplanes in order to combat the devastating effects that the boll weevil had on cotton crops. Biedenharn's home and gardens have been preserved and are now operated as the Biedenharn Museum and Gardens and are open to the public.

Collett E. Woolman, the Ouachita Parish agent, was originally from Indiana. He pioneered crop dusting to eradicate the boll weevil, which destroyed cotton throughout the Mississippi Delta in the early 20th century. Woolman originated the first crop-dusting service in the world. The collapse of cotton production meant a widespread loss of farm jobs, which contributed to the early-20th-century Great Migration, when a total of 1.5 million African Americans left the rural South for jobs in northern and midwestern cities. They were also escaping the oppressive racial conditions and violence under Jim Crow and the disenfranchisement that excluded most blacks from the political system.

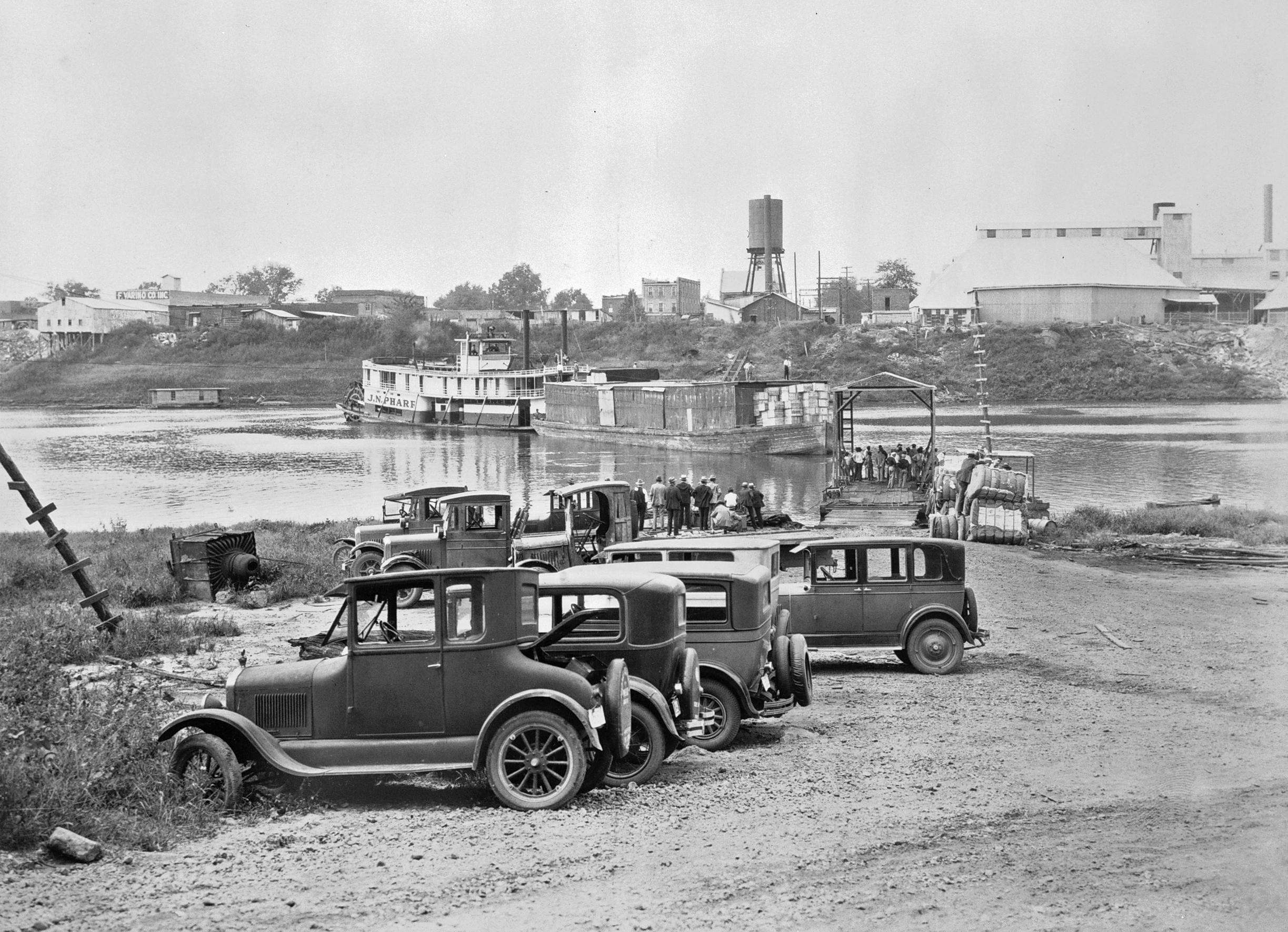
A steam towboat on the Ouachita River arriving at Monroe with a tow, 1929

Howard D. Griffin (1911–1986) purchased a boat dealership in 1936 while a student at what became the University of Louisiana Monroe. By the 1960s, Griffin's company had become the world's largest outboard motor dealership, and he also sold motorcycles. From 1955 to 1985, Griffin and his wife, Birdie M. Griffin (1915–1985), operated their seasonal Land O' Toys store in Monroe.

== Geography ==
Located in northeastern Louisiana, Monroe is the center of the Monroe metropolitan statistical area. It is the parish seat of Ouachita Parish, and northeastern Louisiana's economic and cultural hub. Monroe has an elevation of 72 feet (21.9 m) above sea level. According to the United States Census Bureau, the city has a total area of 31.6 square miles (83.9 km^{2}), of which, 28.7 square miles (74.3 km^{2}) is land and 3.7 square miles (9.6 km^{2}) is water. The total area is 11.46% water.

=== Climate ===
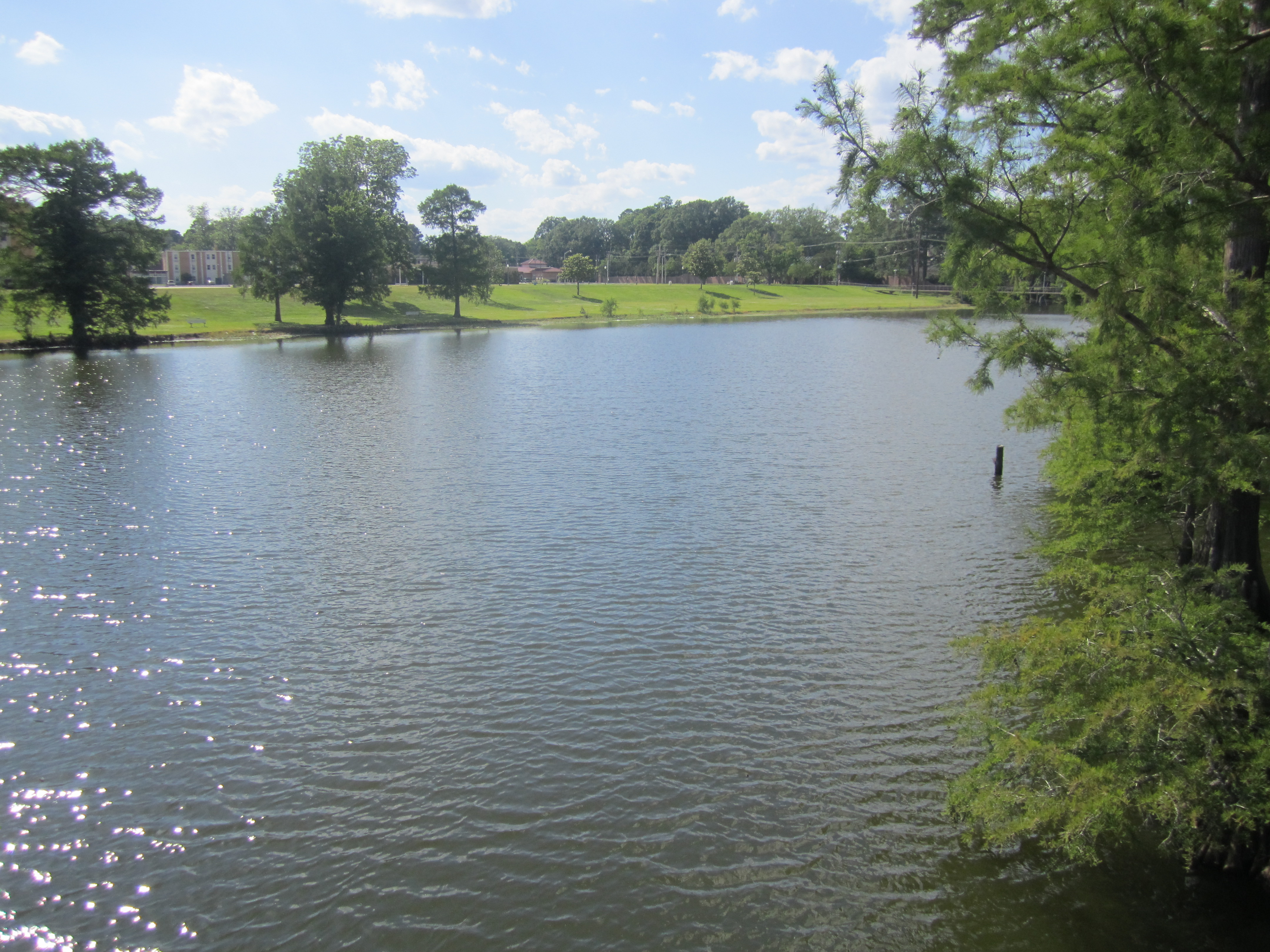
Bayou Desiard flows through Monroe.

Monroe has a humid subtropical climate (Köppen climate classification Cfa). Rainfall is abundant, with the normal annual precipitation averaging over 51 inches (1.3 m). Monthly averages range from less than 3 inches (76 mm) in August to more than 5 inches (130 mm) in June. Severe thunderstorms with heavy rain, hail, damaging winds and tornadoes occur in the area during the spring and summer months.

The winter months are normally mild, with an average of 35 days of freezing or below-freezing temperatures per year, with ice and sleet storms possible. Summer months are hot and humid, with maximum temperatures exceeding 90 degrees an average of 91 days per year, with high to very high relative average humidity, sometimes exceeding the 90 percent level.

Climate data for Monroe, Louisiana (Monroe Regional Airport), 1991–2020 normals, extremes 1893–present
Month	Jan	Feb	Mar	Apr	May	Jun	Jul	Aug	Sep	Oct	Nov	Dec	Year
Record high °F (°C)	86 (30)	89 (32)	95 (35)	97 (36)	104 (40)	108 (42)	109 (43)	108 (42)	107 (42)	101 (38)	90 (32)	89 (32)	109 (43)
Mean maximum °F (°C)	75.6 (24.2)	78.7 (25.9)	84.2 (29.0)	88.2 (31.2)	92.7 (33.7)	96.5 (35.8)	99.5 (37.5)	100.2 (37.9)	97.2 (36.2)	90.9 (32.7)	82.8 (28.2)	78.0 (25.6)	101.3 (38.5)
Mean daily maximum °F (°C)	57.0 (13.9)	61.1 (16.2)	69.1 (20.6)	76.8 (24.9)	84.4 (29.1)	90.5 (32.5)	93.2 (34.0)	93.6 (34.2)	88.7 (31.5)	78.8 (26.0)	67.3 (19.6)	59.0 (15.0)	76.6 (24.8)
Daily mean °F (°C)	46.8 (8.2)	50.7 (10.4)	58.1 (14.5)	65.5 (18.6)	73.8 (23.2)	80.3 (26.8)	82.8 (28.2)	82.5 (28.1)	77.1 (25.1)	66.3 (19.1)	55.6 (13.1)	48.8 (9.3)	65.7 (18.7)
Mean daily minimum °F (°C)	36.7 (2.6)	40.2 (4.6)	47.2 (8.4)	54.2 (12.3)	63.1 (17.3)	70.1 (21.2)	72.5 (22.5)	71.4 (21.9)	65.5 (18.6)	53.7 (12.1)	43.9 (6.6)	38.6 (3.7)	54.8 (12.7)
Mean minimum °F (°C)	21.3 (−5.9)	26.0 (−3.3)	30.6 (−0.8)	38.8 (3.8)	50.0 (10.0)	61.6 (16.4)	66.6 (19.2)	64.9 (18.3)	52.4 (11.3)	37.8 (3.2)	28.4 (−2.0)	24.4 (−4.2)	19.7 (−6.8)
Record low °F (°C)	−1 (−18)	−2 (−19)	18 (−8)	31 (−1)	39 (4)	51 (11)	55 (13)	51 (11)	35 (2)	29 (−2)	19 (−7)	5 (−15)	−2 (−19)
Average precipitation inches (mm)	5.15 (131)	4.65 (118)	5.21 (132)	5.83 (148)	4.43 (113)	4.45 (113)	3.94 (100)	3.56 (90)	3.55 (90)	4.95 (126)	4.16 (106)	5.22 (133)	55.10 (1,400)
Average snowfall inches (cm)	0.6 (1.5)	0.1 (0.25)	0.1 (0.25)	0.0 (0.0)	0.0 (0.0)	0.0 (0.0)	0.0 (0.0)	0.0 (0.0)	0.0 (0.0)	0.0 (0.0)	0.0 (0.0)	0.1 (0.25)	0.9 (2.3)
Average precipitation days (≥ 0.01 in)	10.2	9.7	9.8	8.3	9.7	9.3	9.2	7.6	6.8	7.5	8.2	9.9	106.2
Average snowy days (≥ 0.1 in)	0.3	0.4	0.1	0.0	0.0	0.0	0.0	0.0	0.0	0.0	0.0	0.2	1.0
Source: NOAA (snow 1981–2010)

=== Notable natural disasters ===
==== March 2016 flood ====
In March 2016, rainfall amounts ranging between 15 and 20 inches fell area-wide over 3 days, more than any 3-day period ever previously recorded. In Ouachita Parish alone, there were 9,500 homes with flood damage, and 5,400 were completely flooded. More than 1,700 high-water rescues were performed.

==== 2020 tornado ====
As part of the 2020 Easter tornado outbreak, on April 12, the community was struck by a low-end EF3 tornado. Damage was severe, but there were no deaths or injuries due to advance warnings.

== Demographics ==
Historical population
Census	Pop.	Note	%±
1850	435		—
1870	1,949		—
1880	2,070		6.2%
1890	3,256		57.3%
1900	5,428		66.7%
1910	10,209		88.1%
1920	12,675		24.2%
1930	26,028		105.3%
1940	28,309		8.8%
1950	38,572		36.3%
1960	52,219		35.4%
1970	56,374		8.0%
1980	57,597		2.2%
1990	54,909		−4.7%
2000	53,107		−3.3%
2010	48,815		−8.1%
2020	47,702		−2.3%
2025 (est.)	46,860	▼	−1.8%
U.S. Decennial Census; 2020 Census

=== Racial and ethnic composition ===
Monroe city, Louisiana – Racial and ethnic composition Note: the US Census treats Hispanic/Latino as an ethnic category. This table excludes Latinos from the racial categories and assigns them to a separate category. Hispanics/Latinos may be of any race.
Race / Ethnicity (NH = Non-Hispanic)	Pop 2000	Pop 2010	Pop 2020	% 2000	% 2010	% 2020
White alone (NH)	19,319	16,096	14,398	36.38%	32.97%	30.18%
Black or African American alone (NH)	32,298	31,038	30,166	60.82%	63.58%	63.24%
Native American or Alaska Native alone (NH)	60	76	84	0.11%	0.16%	0.18%
Asian alone (NH)	555	508	835	1.05%	1.04%	1.75%
Native Hawaiian or Pacific Islander alone (NH)	11	24	10	0.02%	0.05%	0.02%
Other race alone (NH)	26	21	95	0.05%	0.04%	0.20%
Mixed race or Multiracial (NH)	304	492	1,126	0.57%	1.01%	2.36%
Hispanic or Latino (any race)	534	560	988	1.01%	1.15%	2.07%
Total	53,107	48,815	47,702	100.00%	100.00%	100.00%

=== 2020 census ===
As of the 2020 census, there were 47,702 people, 17,327 households, and 9,811 families residing in the city. At the 2019 American Community Survey, there were 48,241 people and 17,327 households. In 2010, the population was 48,815, declining from the city's historic high of 57,597 at the 1980 U.S. census.

Of the 17,327 households in 2019, there were 7,409 owner-occupied housing units. An estimated 3,493 of owner-occupied housing units were married couples living together; 354 were male households with no female present, and 927 were female households with no male present. There was an average family size of 3.58; 27.4% of all households were married couples living together, 29.8% were male households with no female present, and 46.4% were female households with no male present.

The median income for a household in the city was $30,438 versus $51,073 nationwide. Families had an annual median income of $38,374, married-couple families $75,089, and non-family households $21,210. Approximately 36.8% of the population lived at or below the poverty line; 54.1% under 18 years, 32.2% aged 18 to 16, and 21.3% aged 65 and older lived at or below the poverty line in 2019.

In 2019, the racial and ethnic makeup of the city was 62.0% Black or African American, 32.7% non-Hispanic or Latin American white, 0.2% American Indian and Alaska Native, 0.8% Asian, 1.0% some other race, 0.9% two or more races, and 2.3% Hispanic and Latin American of any race. Among the Hispanic and Latin American population at the 2019 American Community Survey, the largest groups were Mexican Americans (1.2%) and Puerto Ricans (0.1%). Other Hispanic and Latin Americans made up 1.0% of the total population. Vietnamese and Chinese Americans were the largest Asian American groups in the city, followed by Asian Indians; the Vietnamese community in Monroe and the rest of Louisiana grew following the Vietnam War.

=== Religion ===
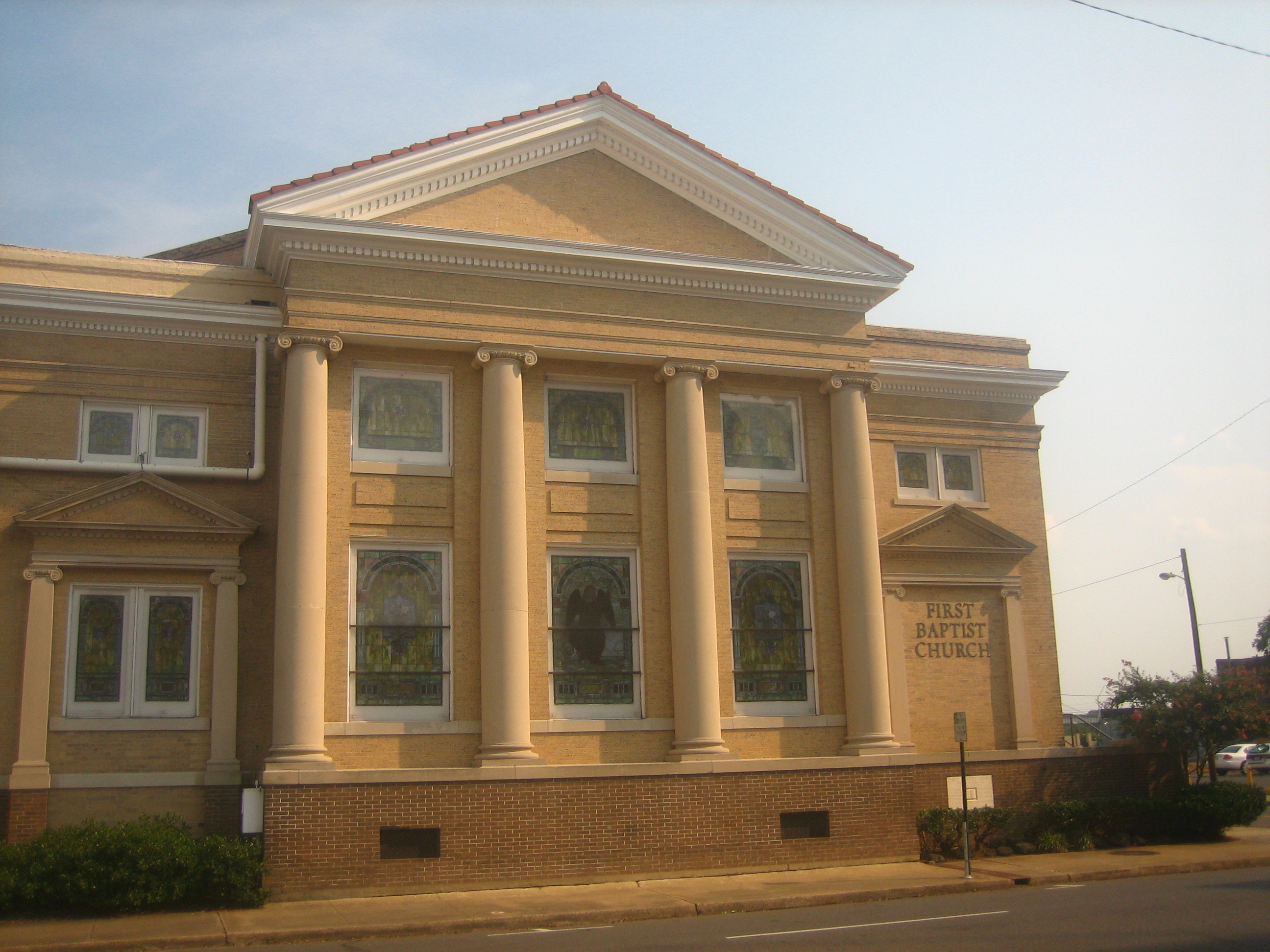
First Baptist Church, Monroe

As part of the Bible Belt, Christianity is the largest religion in Monroe, the city's metropolitan area, and North Louisiana. In common with much of northern and Central Louisiana, Baptists makes up the largest Christian denomination by affiliation. As a predominantly-African-American city, the largest Baptist denominations are the National Baptist Convention, USA; the National Baptist Convention of America; and the Progressive National Baptist Convention. The Southern Baptist Convention also has churches throughout the Monroe area.

Methodism make up the second-largest Christian denomination by affiliation, primarily divided among the African Methodist Episcopal and Christian Methodist Episcopal churches. The Catholic Church is the third-largest, and the city's Catholic population is served by the Roman Catholic Diocese of Shreveport as of 2021. Pentecostalism is a growing tradition among the population, divided among Classical Pentecostals, and Oneness Pentecostals. The Church of God in Christ and United Pentecostal Church are the largest Pentecostal denominations in the city and metropolitan area; there are also some independent Oneness Pentecostal churches in the city.

Islam is Monroe's second-largest religion. Muslims are predominantly Sunni, though the Nation of Islam also maintains a presence in the area. Former mayor Jamie Mayo controversially awarded a key to the city to the head of the Nation of Islam Louis Farrakhan.

Judaism is Monroe's third-largest religion, with most being of the Reform denomination. Temple B'nai Israel, established in 1868, is Monroe's oldest synagogue.

== Economy ==
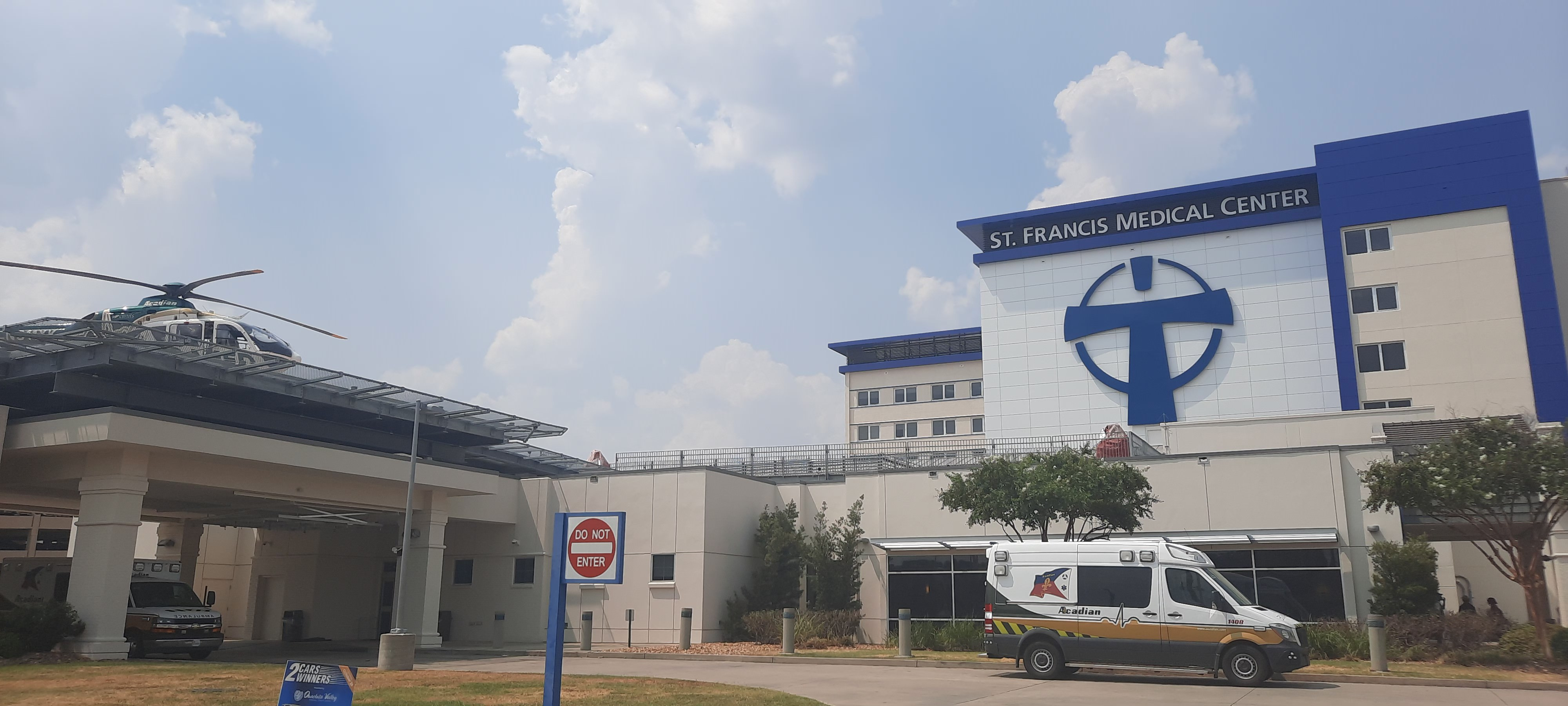
St. Francis Medical Center is located off Interstate 20 in downtown Monroe.

=== Top employers ===
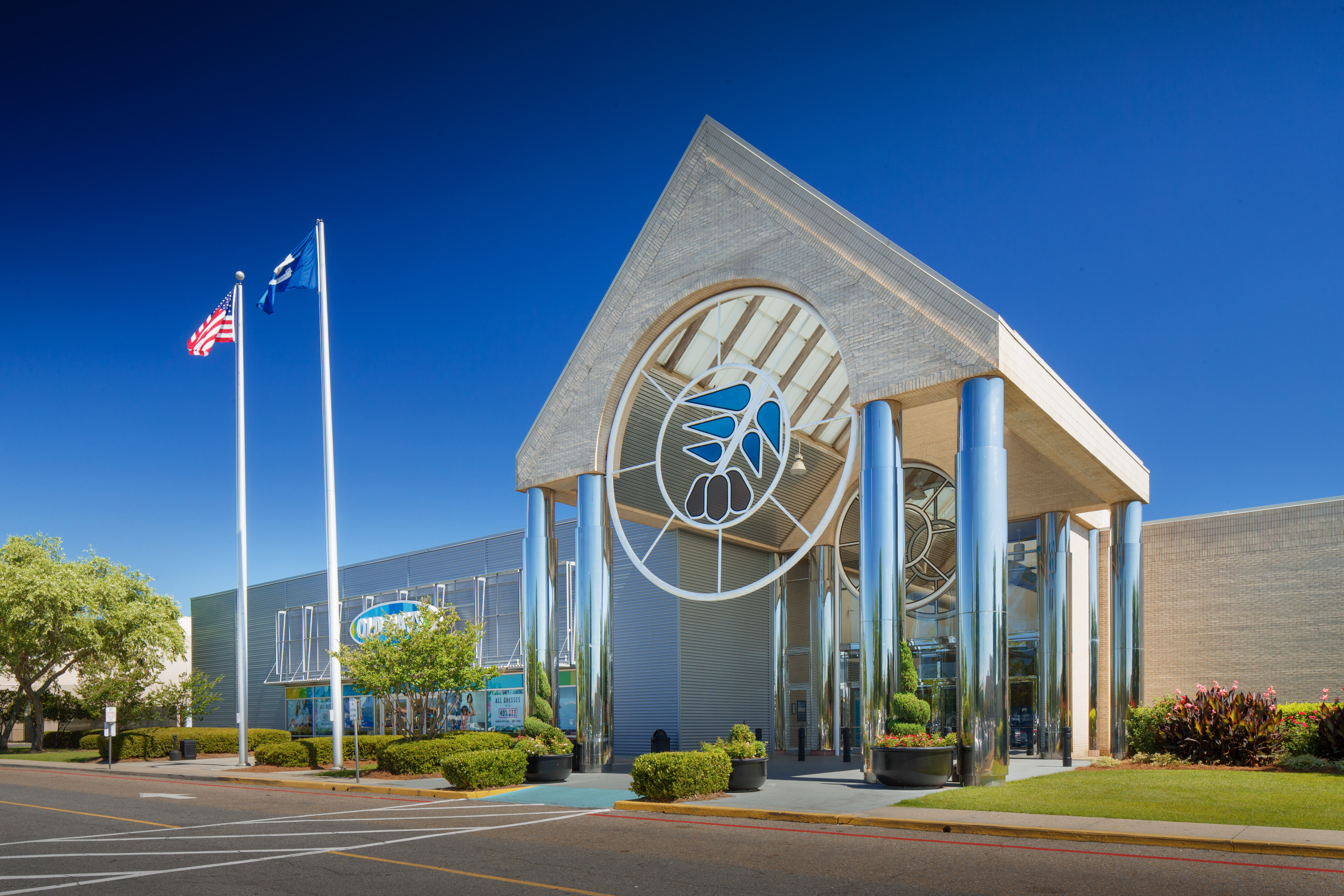
Pecanland Mall south entrance

According to the city's 2019 Comprehensive Annual Financial Report, the largest employers in the city are:

#	Employer	# of employees
1	Ouachita Parish School Board	2,844
2	Lumen Technologies, Inc. (formerly CenturyLink)	2,360
3	St. Francis Specialty Hospital	1,584
4	Monroe City Schools	1,348
5	IASIS Healthcare (Glenwood Regional Medical Center)	1,156
6	City of Monroe	1,105
7	JPMorgan Chase Bank, N.A.	930
8	Walmart (three locations)	912
9	University of Louisiana at Monroe	885
10	Graphic Packaging Holding Company	840

=== Shopping ===
- Pecanland Mall has major anchor stores: Belk, Dillard's, and JC Penney. The largest mall in North Louisiana, it has a total of 83 retail stores.

== Government ==
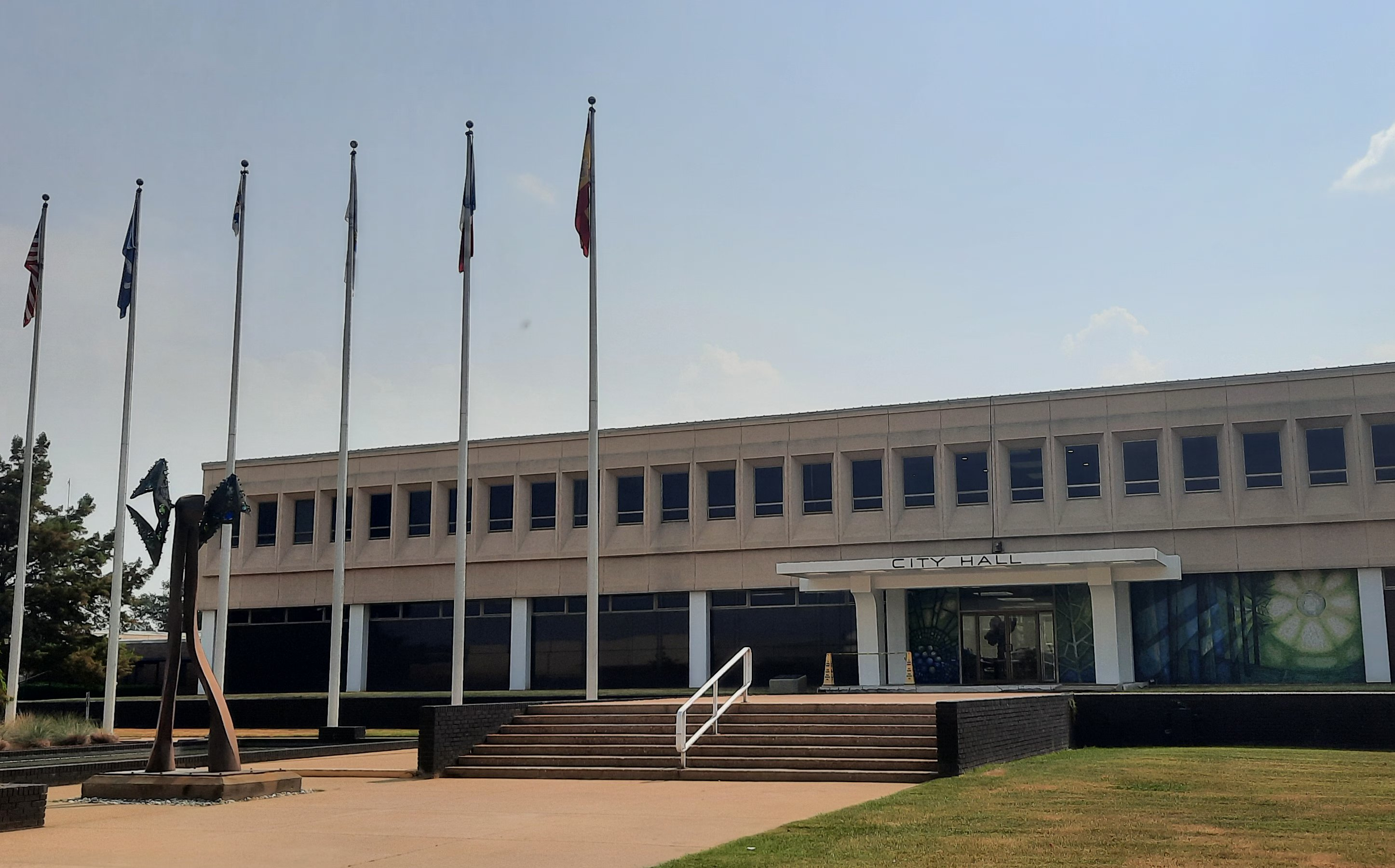
Monroe City Hall in 2023

Monroe uses a mayor–council form of government. It is led by a city council consisting of a mayor and five councilors. The mayor is elected at large and city councilors are elected by members of a geographic district. Each city council meeting has time for public comment.

In the Louisiana State Legislature, Monroe is in the 33rd and 34th Senate districts, represented by Republican Stewart Cathey Jr. and Democrat Katrina Jackson, and the 14th, 16th, and 17th House districts, represented by Republican Michael Charles Echols, and Democrats Adrian Fisher and Patricia "Pat" Moore.

Monroe is located in Louisiana's 5th congressional district, represented by Julia Letlow in the United States House of Representatives.

== Arts and culture ==
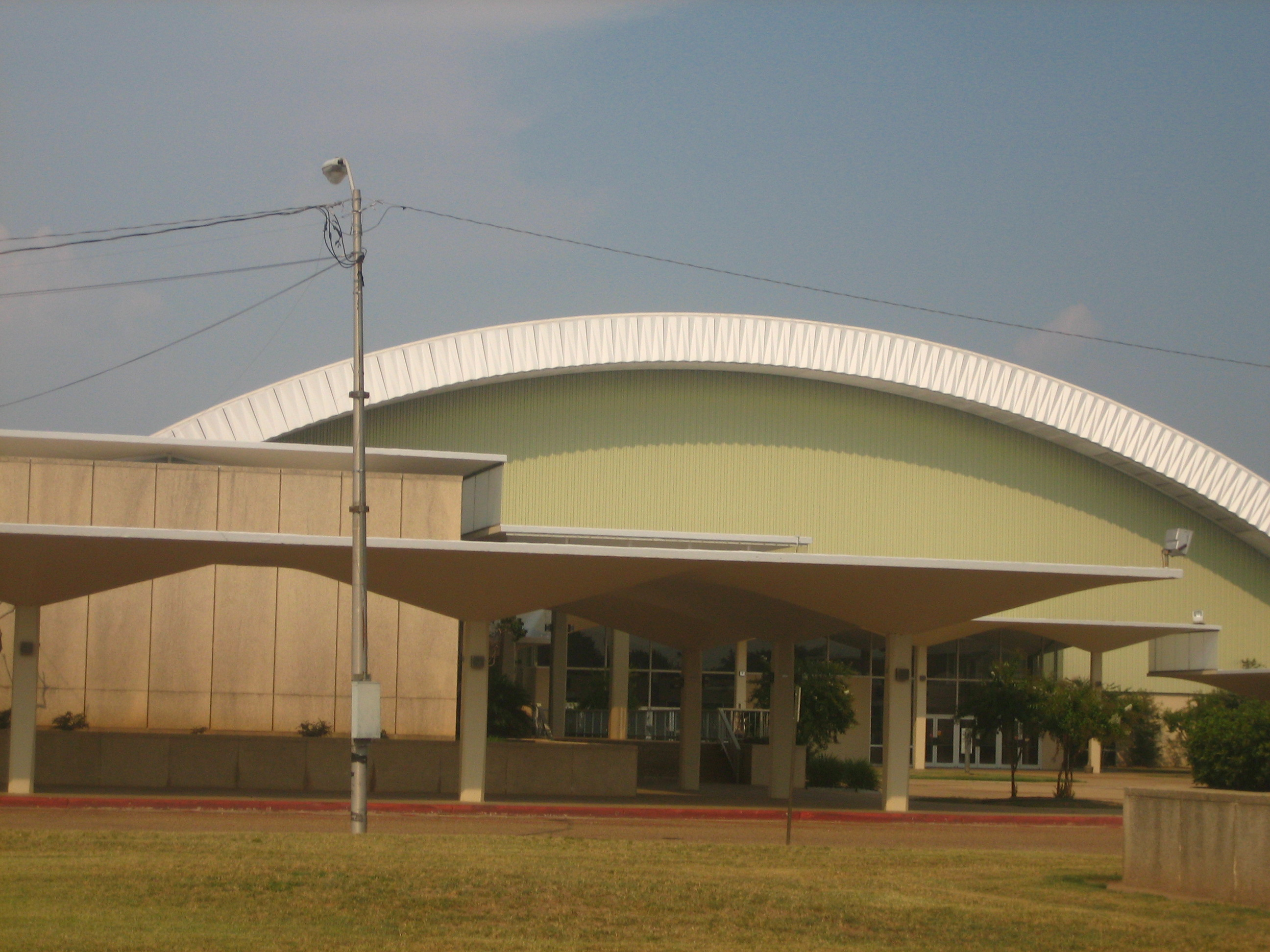
Monroe Convention Hall across Monroe Civic Center designed by Hugh G. Parker, Jr.

The Monroe Civic Center has multiple facilities, the main complex being the Civic Center arena. The arena provides 44,000 square feet (4,100 m^{2}) of exhibit space along with 5,600 seats, with a larger potential capacity of up to 7,200 seats. The arena houses events such as banquets, circuses, and rodeos.

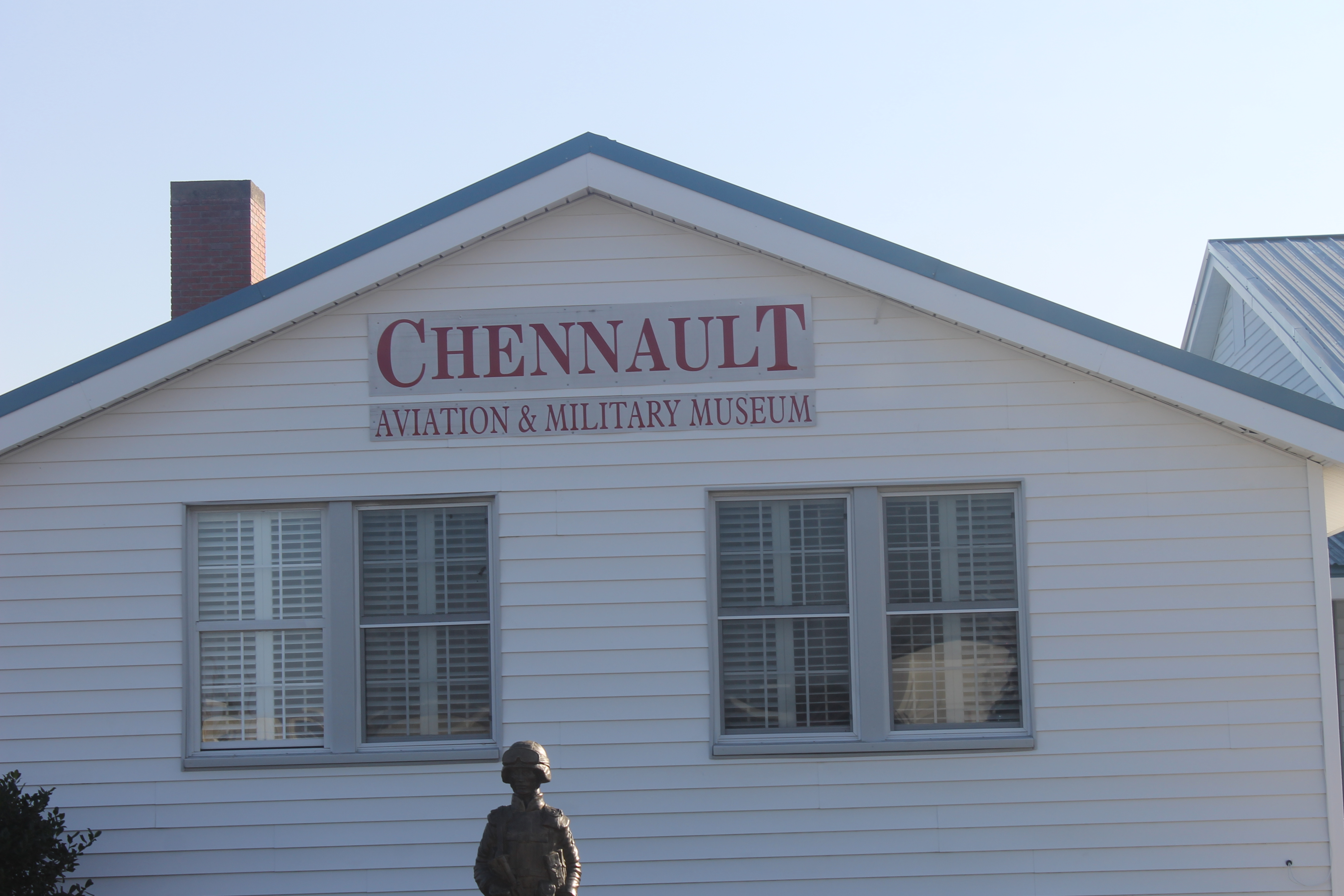
The Chennault Aviation and Military Museum in Monroe

The center also holds the B. D. Robinson Conference Hall, Monroe Convention Center, equestrian pavilion, and the 2,200-seat W. L. Jack Howard Theatre named for W. L. "Jack" Howard, the Union Parish native who served as mayor of Monroe from 1956 to 1972 and again from 1976 to 1978. The Harvey H. Benoit Recreation Center is used for basketball games and has outdoor tennis courts.

During the last week of June, Monroe hosts the annual Miss Louisiana pageant.

Monroe is the home of the Louisiana Purchase Gardens and Zoo, which collectively maintains over 500 animals. It also offers boat rides and a catwalk, in addition to other seasonal activities.

The Monroe area is home to several museums, including the Northeast Louisiana Children's Museum, the Biedenharn Museum and Gardens, the Chennault Aviation and Military Museum, the Masur Museum of Arts, and the Northeast Louisiana Delta African-American Heritage Museum. This is one of the 26 sites identified in the early 21st century as part of the state's African American Heritage Trail.

== Parks and recreation ==
Monroe is home to the Black Bayou Lake National Wildlife Refuge. Admission is free.

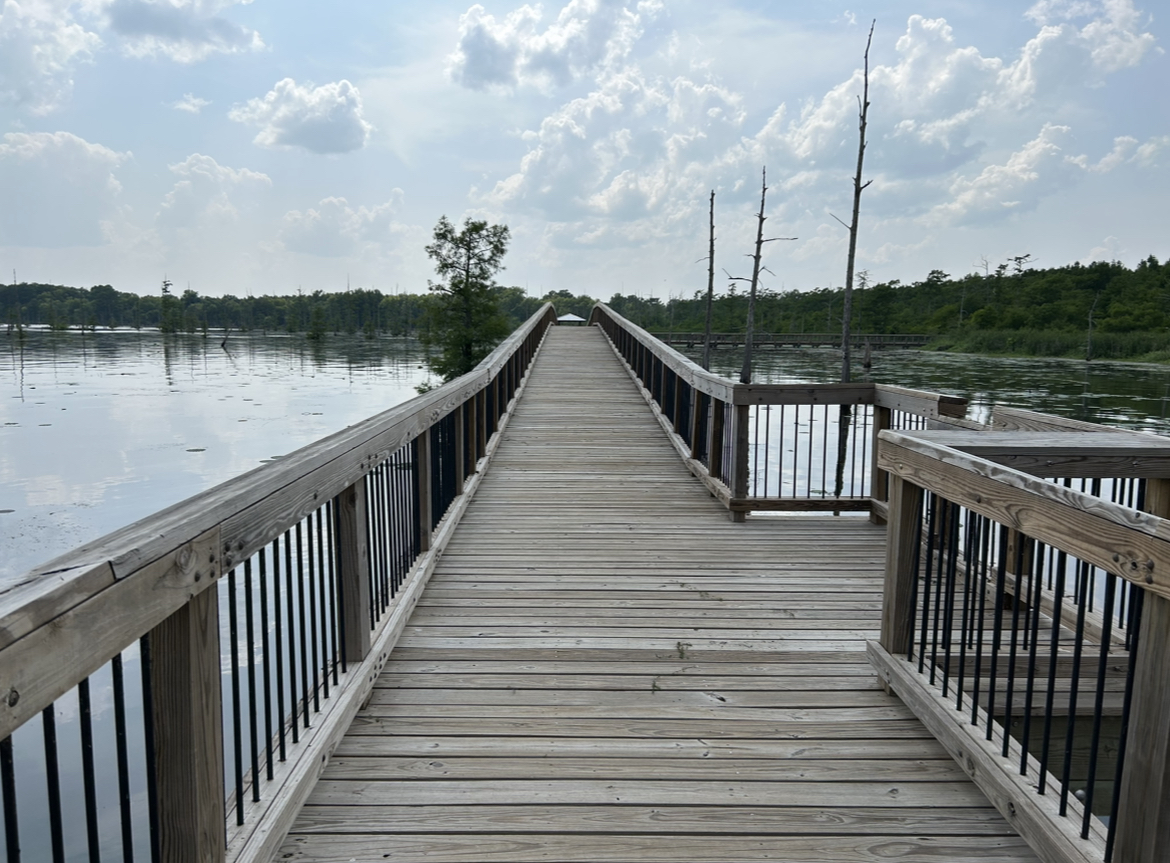
Black Bayou Lake National Wildlife Refuge

=== Parks ===
The City of Monroe owns and operates 17 city parks.

- Jesse Williams Park
- Lamyville/Magnolia Park
- Charles Johnson Park
- Orange Street Park
- Mt. Nebo Playground Park
- Anita Lane Park
- Hawthorne Street Park
- Myrtle Street Park
- Jasmine Street/Civic Street Park
- Triangle/Stuart Park
- Lida Benton Playground
- Anna Grey Noe Park
- Henry Bry Park
- River Oaks Neighborhood Park
- Sherrouse Neighborhood Park
- Forsythe Point Recreation Area
- Forsythe Park

=== Golf ===
- Bayou Desiard Country Club
- Chennault Golf Course
- Frenchman's Bend Country Club
- The Links at Muny, Forsythe Park

=== Professional Sports ===
Monroe was home to the Monroe Moccasins minor league hockey team in the Western Professional Hockey League from 1997 to 2001. The team resumed play in 2024. Monroe is also now home to The Arena League team Monroe Greenheads which will start their season in May 2026.

The revived team is a member of the Federal Prospects Hockey League.

== Media ==
The Gannett owned News Star is the primary daily newspaper serving Monroe and area.

Monroe is served by two African-American-owned weekly newspapers: the Monroe Free Press and the Monroe Dispatch. The Free Press was founded in 1969 by Roosevelt Wright, Jr., and The Dispatch was founded in 1975 by Irma and Frank Detiege. The Ouachita Citizen is a locally owned and operated weekly newspaper that was founded in 1924. It has all-local coverage of events in Ouachita Parish, including Monroe, West Monroe, Sterlington and Richwood.

=== Television ===
Monroe is the principal city of the Monroe media market for television. Both KNOE-TV and KTVE offer a full range of network and local daily news programming.

=== Radio ===
Monroe is served by local radio station KJLO, and KMVX, that also broad KMLB AM 540.

=== Emergency alert stations ===
- KMLB-KNOE 540 AM
- KMVX-KNOE 101.9 FM
- KNOE TV 8
- KTVE-TV 10
- KARD-TV 14

== Education ==
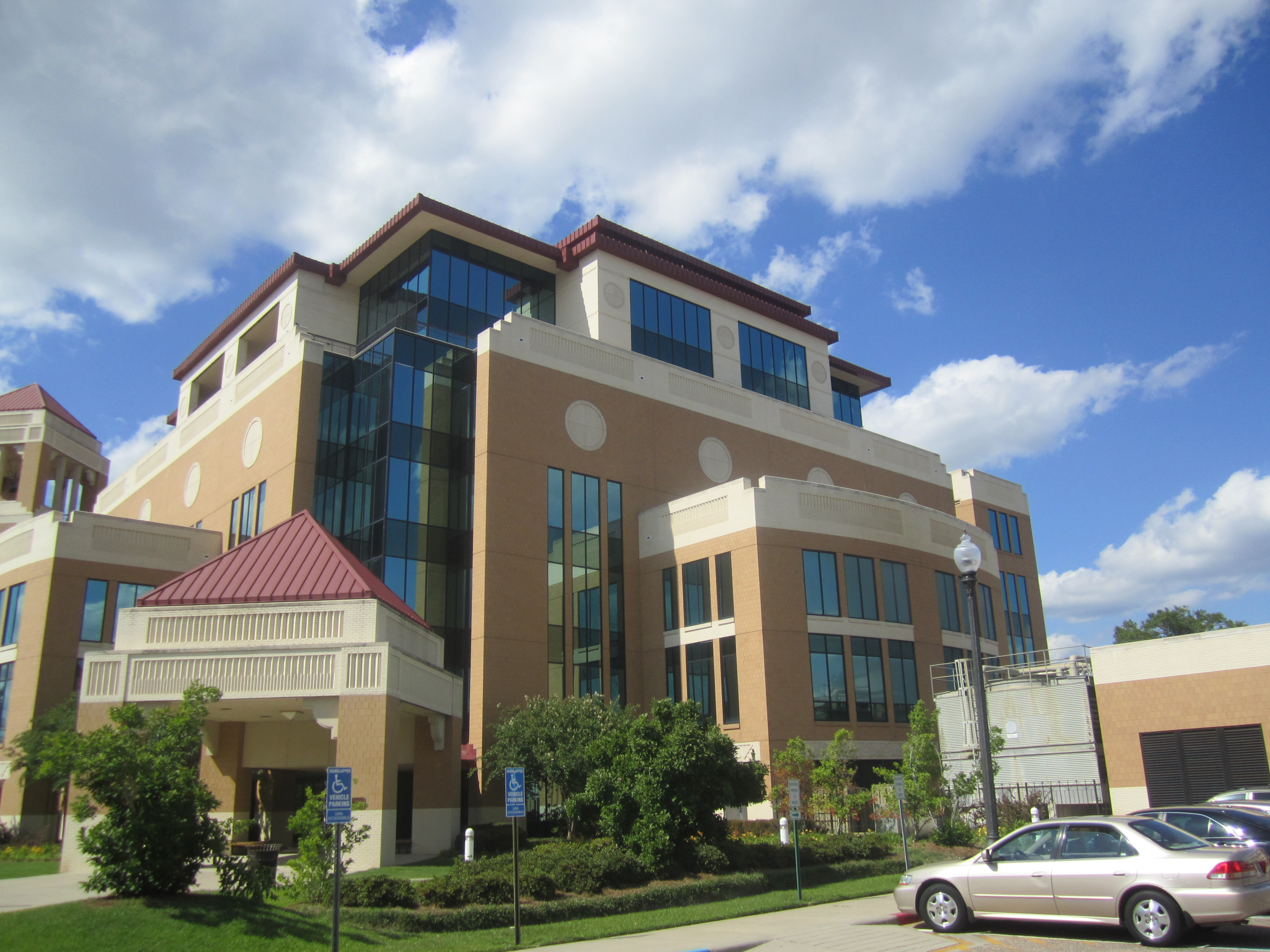
University of Louisiana Monroe Library and Conference Center

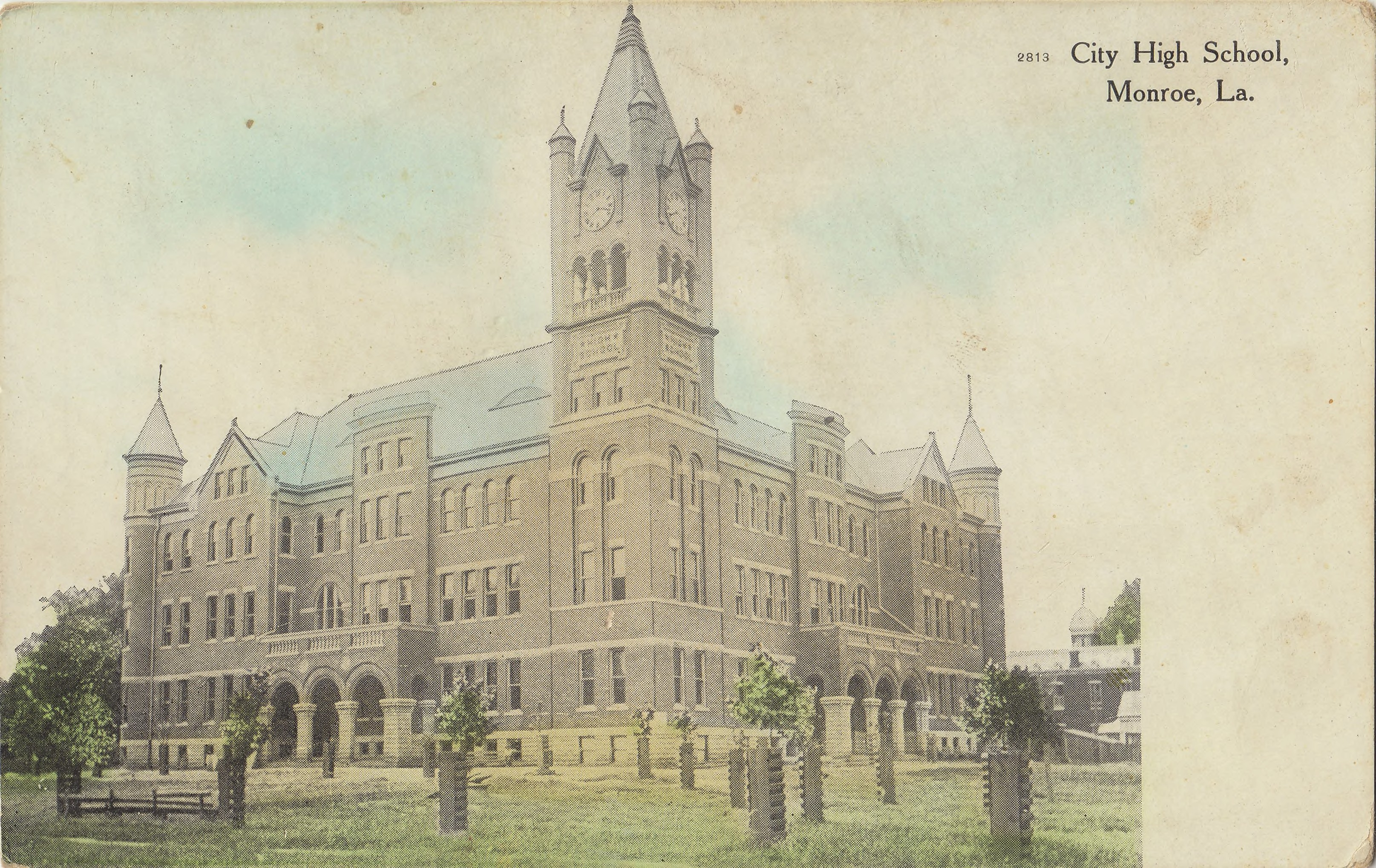
Monroe City High School historic postcard, dated 1907)

=== Colleges and universities ===
- Louisiana Delta Community College
- McCann School of Business & Technology
- University of Louisiana Monroe

=== K-12 education ===
The Monroe City Schools school district is coterminous with the city limits of Monroe.The school district consists of 18 elementary schools, three junior high schools, and three high schools: The Monroe school district operates the following high schools:

- Carroll High School
- Neville High School
- Wossman High School

The City of Monroe school district is surrounded by the separate Ouachita Parish School System. The Ouachita Parish school district formerly had its headquarters in Monroe. Ouachita Junior High School is physically in the Monroe city limits. Ouachita Parish High School and Richwood High School have Monroe postal addresses, though they are in an unincorporated part of the Parish.

Other private high schools in Monroe include:

- St. Frederick Catholic High School - operated by the Diocese of Shreveport
- River Oaks School - located outside the city limits with a Monroe postal address

== Infrastructure ==
=== National Guard ===
Monroe is home to the 528th Engineer Battalion of the Louisiana Army National Guard. This unit is part of the 225th Engineer Brigade which is headquartered in Pineville, Louisiana at Louisiana National Guard Training Center Pineville.

=== Transportation ===
Monroe was the founding city of Delta Air Lines in the 1920s. As the airline expanded, it moved to Atlanta. Monroe Regional Airport serves the city and northeast Louisiana. It has three main runways and is served by regional partners of American Airlines and Delta Air Lines.

Greyhound Bus Lines provides transportation from Monroe to many cities across the nation. Monroe has the oldest municipally owned transit system in the nation. Created in 1906 as a four-line street railroad, the Monroe Transit System now provides 13 fixed bus routes covering most areas of the city, and three demand-response buses serving the disabled.

Monroe can be accessed from Interstate 20, U.S. Highway 165, Louisiana Highway 15, U.S. Highway 80, and Interstate 420 (proposed).

Kansas City Southern, Union Pacific, BNSF, and Norfolk Southern serve freight traffic in the city.
