= Louisiana Highway 34 =

State highway in Louisiana, United States

Louisiana Highway 34

- Route of LA 34 highlighted in red

Route information
- Maintained by Louisiana DOTD
- Length: 86.124 mi (138.603 km)
- Existed: 1955 renumbering–present

Major junctions
- South end: US 71 / LA 1239-2 in Montgomery
- US 84 / US 167 in Winnfield; US 84 in Joyce; LA 4 in Chatham; I-20 in West Monroe
- North end: US 80 / LA 15 in West Monroe

Location
- Country: United States
- State: Louisiana
- Parishes: Grant, Winn, Jackson, Ouachita

Highway system
- Louisiana State Highway System; Interstate; US; State; Scenic
← LA 33	→ LA 35

Louisiana Highway 34 (LA 34) is a state highway located in central and northern Louisiana. It runs 86.12 miles (138.60 km) in a southwest to northeast direction from the junction of U.S. Highway 71 (US 71) and LA 1239-2 in Montgomery to a junction with the concurrent US 80/LA 15 in West Monroe.

The route connects Monroe, the principal city of northeastern Louisiana and the seat of Ouachita Parish, with Winnfield, a smaller city that serves as the seat of Winn Parish. Winnfield is located at the junction of US 84 and US 167, which run concurrent with LA 34 through the center of town. Near its northeastern terminus in West Monroe, LA 34 has an interchange with Interstate 20 (I-20).

Outside Winnfield and the Monroe metropolitan area, LA 34 is an entirely rural highway that passes through the occasional small community. These include the Jackson Parish towns of Chatham and Eros, as well as the Winn Parish village of Atlanta.

LA 34 was created from portions of nine different former routes designated at various times during the 1920s and 1930s. The Louisiana Department of Highways combined them under a single designation in the 1955 renumbering of the state's highway system.

== Route description ==
=== Montgomery to Winnfield ===
From the south, LA 34 begins at a junction with US 71 in the town of Montgomery. This junction also marks the northern terminus of LA 1239-2 (Caddo Street), a state-maintained local road. LA 34 heads northward from town as an undivided two-lane highway and crosses from Grant Parish into Winn Parish. The highway curves to the northeast and, over the next 14.5 miles (23.3 km), passes through the tiny rural communities of Mt. Zion, Wheeling, Sardis, as well as the village of Atlanta. In Atlanta, a junction with LA 471 connects with Verda back in Grant Parish.

Six miles (9.7 km) northeast of Sardis, LA 34 enters the city of Winnfield, the seat of Winn Parish. The highway travels along South Jones Street across the Kansas City Southern Railway (KCS) line to a junction with the concurrent US 84/US 167 at West Court Street. LA 34 turns east to follow US 84/US 167, becoming an undivided four-lane highway with a center turning lane. The route overpasses the KCS tracks and transitions onto East Lafayette Street. On the east side of town, US 167 curves south toward Alexandria while US 84 and LA 34 turn north at a T-intersection onto East Boundary Street, narrowing again to two lanes. After a short distance, the route turns northeast at a Y-intersection with Maple Street and exits the Winnfield corporate limits.

=== Winnfield to Eros ===
After crossing the Dugdemona River northeast of Winnfield, US 84 branches off of LA 34 in Joyce and heads toward Tullos. LA 34 curves due north and intersects LA 126 about midway between points known as Hudson and Gaars Mill. LA 126 connects with Dodson to the west and Sikes to the east. North of this junction, LA 34 curves its way through the thick piney woods before crossing from Winn Parish into Jackson Parish.

Immediately across the parish line, LA 34 intersects LA 147 (Walker Road), which branches northwest toward the town of Jonesboro. The alignment of LA 34 straightens out for about seven miles (11 km) as the highway passes along the east side of the Caney Creek Reservoir and Jimmie Davis State Park. North of Womack, however, LA 34 begins to follow the natural contours of the terrain once again. In the tiny town of Chatham, LA 34 intersects LA 4, a rural cross-state route. In the even smaller incorporated town of Eros, LA 34 has a brief concurrency with LA 148 and also intersects LA 144, which heads north toward Calhoun and Choudrant.

=== Eros to West Monroe ===
Immediately northeast of Eros, LA 34 crosses into Ouachita Parish. Passing through Guyton, LA 546 begins and branches northeast toward I-20 at Cheniere. LA 34 curves due east for 10.4 miles (16.7 km) to a junction with LA 557. The highway then turns northeast and proceeds into the suburban Brownsville–Bawcomville area. Here, the roadway widens again to four lanes with a center turning lane. LA 617 begins and proceeds straight ahead onto Thomas Road while LA 34 turns east onto Jonesboro Road, remaining in its same capacity.

The highway enters the city of West Monroe and crosses the KCS railroad tracks a final time before engaging in a modified cloverleaf interchange with I-20 at exit 115. The interstate heads east across the Ouachita River into Monroe and west toward Shreveport. While passing through the interchange, LA 34 transitions onto the one-way couplet of Mill Street (eastbound) and Stella Street (westbound). It then immediately intersects LA 143 (North 7th Street). Four blocks later, the travel lanes of LA 34 converge onto Bridge Street. The route then terminates at a junction with the concurrent US 80/LA 15, which turns from Cypress Street onto Bridge Street to continue ahead across the Ouachita River and into Monroe.

=== Route classification and data ===
LA 34 is generally classified as a rural major collector by the Louisiana Department of Transportation and Development (La DOTD). However, the route serves as an urban minor arterial in Winnfield and the Brownsville-Bawcomville area and as an urban principal arterial in West Monroe. Daily traffic volume in 2013 peaked at 28,300 vehicles in West Monroe. Outside the Monroe metropolitan area, traffic counts generally stayed between 1,300 and 3,500 vehicles with a low of 410 reported near the southern terminus in Montgomery. The posted speed limit ranges from 55 mph (90 km/h) in rural areas to as low as 25 mph (40 km/h) or 35 mph (55 km/h) in populated areas.

== History ==
In the original Louisiana Highway system in use between 1921 and 1955, the modern LA 34 was split amongst several different routes, including State Route C-1479 from Montgomery to Atlanta; State Route 5 to Winnfield; State Route 6 through the center of Winnfield; State Route 234 to the Jackson Parish line; State Route 1305 to Womack; State Route 164 to Chatham; State Route 13 to Guyton; State Route 1295 to south of Bawcomville; and State Route 200 to West Monroe. The above highways were joined together under the single designation of LA 34 when the Louisiana Department of Highways renumbered the state highway system in 1955. Motorists could now travel the most direct route between Winnfield and Monroe by following one highway number.

Class "A": La 34—From a junction with La-US 84 at or near Winnfield through or near Chatham, Eros and Brownsville to a junction with La-US 80 at or near West Monroe.
Class "B": La 34—From a junction with La-US 71 at or near Montgomery through or near Atlanta to a junction with La-US 84 at or near Winnfield.

— 1955 legislative route description

With the 1955 renumbering, the state highway department initially categorized all routes into three classes: "A" (primary), "B" (secondary), and "C" (farm-to-market). This system has since been updated and replaced by a more specific functional classification system.

LA 34 has seen only minor changes over the years that have mostly resulted from the straightening of curves and the replacement of bridges on the route. The highway was slightly re-routed in West Monroe when I-20 was constructed through town in 1964. The original route followed Natchitoches Street rather than the one-way couplet of Stella and Mill Streets. In the 1970s, LA 34 was shifted onto a newly constructed parallel alignment south of Bawcomville, eliminating two railroad crossings. Part of the original route survives as Kings Lake Road. Further west near Guyton, a curved section of road now known as Jimmy Graham Loop was also bypassed. In Winn Parish, a number of curves were smoothed out near Sardis, south of Winnfield.

More recently, the junction of LA 34 and LA 617 was moved north two blocks to accommodate an industrial facility. The junction was formerly a four-way intersection aligned with LA 840-1 (Smith Street). In 2006, the highway was streamlined through Winnfield when a new overpass was constructed across the Kansas City Southern Railway line. The project also involved changing the original zigzag from Court Street onto Lafayette Street into a smooth transition and widening the connecting roadways. Finally, a curve was eliminated north of Hudson in Winn Parish around 2009 as part of a resurfacing project.

== Major intersections ==
Parish	Location	mi	km	Destinations	Notes
Grant	Montgomery	0.000	0.000	US 71 – Alexandria, Shreveport; LA 1239-2 (Caddo Street)	Southern terminus of LA 34; northern terminus of LA 1239-2
Winn		13.272– 13.339	21.359– 21.467	LA 471 south – Verda	Northern terminus of LA 471; 0.3 miles (0.48 km) west of Atlanta
Winn		15.405	24.792	LA 3136 west	Eastern terminus of LA 3136
Winn		16.925	27.238	LA 1229 north	Southern terminus of LA 1229
Winn	Sardis	17.721	28.519	LA 1228 east	South end of LA 1228 concurrency
Winn		18.608	29.947	LA 1228 west	North end of LA 1228 concurrency
Winn	Winnfield	25.225	40.596	US 84 west / US 167 north (West Court Street) – Clarence, Jonesboro	South end of US 84 and US 167 concurrencies
Winn	Winnfield	25.576	41.161	LA 1231-1 south / LA 1231-2 north (South Grove Street)	Northern terminus of LA 1231-1; southern terminus of LA 1231-2
Winn		26.356	42.416	US 167 south – Alexandria	North end of US 167 concurrency
Winn	Joyce	28.475	45.826	US 84 east – Tullos, Olla	North end of US 84 concurrency
Winn		29.356	47.244	LA 499 north – Sikes	Southern terminus of LA 499
Winn		36.505	58.749	LA 1236 west	Eastern terminus of LA 1236
Winn		38.564	62.063	LA 126 – Dodson, Sikes	
Jackson		44.776– 44.801	72.060– 72.100	LA 147 north (Walker Road) – Jonesboro	Southern terminus of LA 147
Jackson		50.283	80.923	LA 810	Eastern terminus of LA 810
Jackson	Chatham	57.127	91.937	LA 4 – Jonesboro, Columbia	
Jackson	Chatham	58.669	94.419	LA 548	Western terminus of LA 548
Jackson		62.517	100.611	LA 148 west (Century Loop)	South end of LA 148 concurrency
Jackson	Eros	63.848	102.753	LA 148 east (Okaloosa Road)	North end of LA 148 concurrency
Jackson	Eros	64.191	103.305	LA 144 north – Calhoun, Choudrant	Southern terminus of LA 144
Ouachita		67.645	108.864	LA 546 – Calhoun	Southern terminus of LA 546
Ouachita		75.708	121.840	LA 3033 – Cheniere	Southern terminus of LA 3033
Ouachita		78.043	125.598	LA 557	Northern terminus of LA 557
Ouachita	Brownsville	83.772	134.818	LA 840-1 (Smith Street)	Eastern terminus of LA 840-1
Ouachita	Brownsville	83.919	135.055	LA 617 (Thomas Road)	Southern terminus of LA 617
Ouachita	West Monroe	85.144– 85.661	137.026– 137.858	I-20 – Monroe, Shreveport	Exit 115 on I-20
Ouachita	West Monroe	85.733	137.974	LA 143 north (North 7th Street)	Southern terminus of LA 143
Ouachita	West Monroe	86.124	138.603	US 80 / LA 15 (Bridge Street, Cypress Street)	Northern terminus
1.000 mi = 1.609 km; 1.000 km = 0.621 mi: Concurrency terminus
