= William Norris III =

American judge

William "Bill" Norris III

Judge of the Louisiana Court of Appeal for the Second Circuit
- In office 1981–2002

Judge of the Louisiana 4th Judicial District Court
- In office 1974–1980

Personal details
- Born: October 17, 1936 West Monroe, Louisiana, US
- Died: July 13, 2016 (aged 79) West Monroe, Louisiana
- Resting place: Hasley Cemetery in West Monroe
- Party: Democratic
- Spouse(s): Not first wife: Carolyn Norris
- Children: 6
- Education: University of Louisiana at Monroe; Tulane University Law School
- Occupation: Lawyer

William Norris III also known as Bill Norris (October 17, 1936 – July 13, 2016), was an American judge from West Monroe, Louisiana, who served at the municipal, district, and circuit court levels.

Norris graduated from Ouachita Parish High School, Northeast Louisiana State College, and Tulane University Law School. Norris practiced law in West Monroe and served on the Ouachita Parish School Board from 1964 to 1971 and from 2011 to 2014 and was a president of the school board. Norris served as West Monroe city attorney from 1964 to 1970 and city judge from 1970 to 1974. From 1974 to 1980, Norris sat on the Louisiana Fourth Judicial District Court, based in Monroe. From 1981 until his retirement in 2002, Norris was a member of the Louisiana Court of Appeal for the Second Circuit, based in Shreveport. After he left his judgeship, he practiced law in West Monroe with his son, Jim Norris.

Norris was an active member of the First Baptist Church of West Monroe. He died at the age of seventy-nine in West Monroe from a stroke and is interred at Hasley Cemetery in West Monroe.

His younger brother, Dave Norris, has been since 1978 the mayor of West Monroe and the longest serving person ever in that position of city government.
