= List of highways numbered 840 =

Route 840, or Highway 840, may refer to:

== Canada ==
- Alberta Highway 840

== United States ==
- I-840
- SR 840
- County Road 840 (Broward County, Florida)
- LA 840
  - LA 840-1
  - LA 840-2
  - LA 840-3
  - LA 840-4
  - LA 840-5
  - LA 840-6
- NY 840
- PR-840
- SR 840 (former)

Preceded by 839	Lists of highways 840	Succeeded by 841
