= Brownsville-Bawcomville, Louisiana =

Brownsville-Bawcomville
- Census-designated place
- Location of Brownsville-Bawcomville in Louisiana
- Coordinates: 32°29′02″N 92°09′50″W
- Country: United States
- State: Louisiana
- Parish: Ouachita

Area
  - Total: 6.7 sq mi (17 km^{2})
  - Land: 6.7 sq mi (17 km^{2})
  - Water: 0.0 sq mi (0 km^{2})
- Elevation: 82 ft (25 m)

Population (2000)
  - Total: 7,616
  - Density: 1,100/sq mi (440/km^{2})
- Time zone: UTC-6 (CST)
  - Summer (DST): UTC-5 (CDT)
- Area code: 318

Brownsville-Bawcomville is a former census-designated place (CDP) in Ouachita Parish, Louisiana, United States. The population was 7,616 at the 2000 census. It is part of the Monroe Metropolitan Statistical Area. For the 2010 census, the U.S. Census Bureau split Brownsville-Bawcomville into its two constituent communities, Brownsville and Bawcomville.

== Geography ==
Brownsville-Bawcomville is located at 32°29′2″N 92°9′50″W (32.483895, −92.163995).

According to the United States Census Bureau, the CDP has a total area of 6.7 square miles (17 km^{2}), all of it land.

== Demographics ==
Historical population
Census	Pop.	Note	%±
1980	7,251		—
1990	7,397		2.0%
2000	7,616		3.0%
U.S. Decennial Census; 1960 1970 1980; 1990 2000 2010

Brownsville-Bawcomville first appeared as a census designated place in the 1980 United States census; the CDP was split into the Brownsville CDP and Bawcomville CDP prior to the 2010 U.S. census.

As of the census of 2000, there were 7,616 people, 2,936 households, and 2,081 families residing in the CDP. The population density was 1,145.5 inhabitants per square mile (442.3/km^{2}). There were 3,373 housing units at an average density of 507.3 per square mile (195.9/km^{2}). The racial makeup of the CDP was 87.30% White, 11.17% African American, 0.51% Native American, 0.07% Asian, 0.28% from other races, and 0.67% from two or more races. Hispanic or Latino of any race were 1.97% of the population.

There were 2,936 households, out of which 31.0% had children under the age of 18 living with them, 50.1% were married couples living together, 15.9% had a female householder with no husband present, and 29.1% were non-families. 23.2% of all households were made up of individuals, and 9.3% had someone living alone who was 65 years of age or older. The average household size was 2.59 and the average family size was 3.05.

In the CDP, the population was spread out, with 26.2% under the age of 18, 11.0% from 18 to 24, 28.1% from 25 to 44, 21.9% from 45 to 64, and 12.8% who were 65 years of age or older. The median age was 35 years. For every 100 females, there were 95.1 males. For every 100 females age 18 and over, there were 89.6 males.

The median income for a household in the CDP was $25,359, and the median income for a family was $28,958. Males had a median income of $24,797 versus $20,368 for females. The per capita income for the CDP was $11,710. About 15.7% of families and 20.2% of the population were below the poverty line, including 27.7% of those under age 18 and 16.6% of those age 65 or over.
