= Bawcomville, Louisiana =

- Unincorporated community
- Location of Bawcomville in Ouachita Parish, Louisiana.

- Location within Louisiana Location within the United States
- Coordinates: 32°28′13″N 92°10′25″W
- Country: United States
- State: Louisiana
- Parish: Ouachita

Government

Area
  - Total: 3.75 sq mi (9.70 km^{2})
  - Land: 3.17 sq mi (8.20 km^{2})
  - Water: 0.58 sq mi (1.50 km^{2})
- Elevation: 85 ft (26 m)

Population (2020)
  - Total: 3,472
  - Density: 1,096.2/sq mi (423.25/km^{2})
- Demonym: Bawcomite
- Time zone: UTC-6 (Central (CST))
  - Summer (DST): UTC-5 (CDT)
- ZIP code: 71292
- Area code: 318
- GNIS feature ID: 2586665

Bawcomville is an unincorporated community and census-designated place in Ouachita Parish, Louisiana, United States. As of the 2020 census, Bawcomville had a population of 3,472.

The Redneck Christmas Parade is held annually in Bawcomville.

== Geography ==
According to the U.S. Census Bureau, the community has an area of 3.744 square miles (9.70 km^{2}); 3.167 square miles (8.20 km^{2}) of its area is land, and 0.577 square miles (1.49 km^{2}) is water.

Prior to 2010, the Census Bureau included both Bawcomville and Brownsville in the Brownsville-Bawcomville census-designated place for statistical purposes.

== Demographics ==
Historical population
Census	Pop.	Note	%±
2010	3,588		—
2020	3,472		−3.2%
U.S. Decennial Census

Bawcomville first appeared in the 2010 U.S. census split out along with the Brownsville CDP from the deleted Brownsville-Bawcomville CDP.

=== 2020 census ===
As of the 2020 census, Bawcomville had a population of 3,472. The median age was 37.7 years. In the CDP, 25.1% of residents were under the age of 18 and 12.9% were 65 years of age or older. For every 100 females there were 101.2 males, and for every 100 females age 18 and over there were 101.2 males age 18 and over.

100.0% of residents lived in urban areas, while 0.0% lived in rural areas.

There were 1,409 households in Bawcomville, including 614 families. Of all households, 32.0% had children under the age of 18 living in them, 31.7% were married-couple households, 25.3% were households with a male householder and no spouse or partner present, and 31.0% were households with a female householder and no spouse or partner present. About 30.4% of all households were made up of individuals and 10.2% had someone living alone who was 65 years of age or older.

There were 1,730 housing units, of which 18.6% were vacant. The homeowner vacancy rate was 4.2% and the rental vacancy rate was 14.1%.

Bawcomville racial composition
Race	Number	Percentage
White (non-Hispanic)	2,514	72.41%
Black or African American (non-Hispanic)	334	9.62%
Native American	19	0.55%
Asian	11	0.32%
Other/Mixed	220	6.34%
Hispanic or Latino	374	10.77%

== Education ==
Ouachita Parish School System is the area school district.

Much of Bawcomville CDP is zoned to Lenwil Elementary School, while a section north of Olive Street and west of Evergreen Street is zoned to Riser Elementary. They both feed into Riser Middle School and West Monroe High School.
