= Chad Cook =

American football player (born 1985)

No. 28
- Position: Fullback

Personal information
- Born: July 24, 1985 (age 41); New Orleans, Louisiana, U.S.
- Listed height: 6 ft 1 in (1.85 m)
- Listed weight: 265 lb (120 kg)

Career information
- High school: West Monroe (West Monroe, Louisiana)
- College: Murray State
- NFL draft: 2007: undrafted

Career history
- Arkansas Twisters (2009); Tampa Bay Storm (2010); Oklahoma City Yard Dawgz (2010); San Jose SaberCats (2011); San Antonio Talons (2012–2013)

Awards and highlights
- Second-team All-Arena (2011)

Career AFL statistics
- Rushing attempts: 285
- Rushing yards: 857
- Rushing TDs: 64
- Receiving Yards: 636
- Receiving TDs: 8
- Stats at ArenaFan.com

Chad "Tank" Cook (born July 24, 1985) is an American former football fullback. He played college football at Murray State University. He was signed as an undrafted free agent by the Tampa Bay Storm in 2010.

== College career ==
Cook was a running back for the Murray State University Racers.

== Professional career ==
=== Tampa Bay Storm ===
Cook signed with the Tampa Bay Storm in 2010, only playing for the Storm as a linebacker.

=== Oklahoma City Yard Dawgz ===
Cook later caught on with the Oklahoma City Yard Dawgz, to finish out the 2010 season.

=== San Jose SaberCats ===
Cook signed with the San Jose SaberCats for the 2011 season. Cook had the best season in SaberCats history for a fullback, breaking team records for rushing attempts (99), rushing yards (294) and rushing touchdowns (30). Cook's play landed him on the All-Arena Second Team as a fullback.

=== San Antonio Talons ===
Cook signed with the San Antonio Talons for the 2012 season. Cook re-signed with the Talons for the 2013 season.
