= David Armand (disambiguation) =

David Armand (born 1977) is an English comedian.

David Armand may also refer to:

- David Armand (author) (born 1980), American novelist

== See also ==
- Armand David (1826–1900), missionary and botanist
