= Haley Hayden =

American softball player

Personal information
- Nationality: American
- Born: June 19, 1995 (age 31) West Monroe, Louisiana
- Height: 5 ft 4 in (1.63 m)

Sport
- Country: USA
- Sport: Softball
- College team: Louisiana Ragin' Cajuns

Haley Hayden (born June 19, 1995) is an American former collegiate softball player. She played college softball for Louisiana.

== Career ==
She attended West Monroe High School and she later attended the University of Louisiana at Lafayette playing as a first baseman and outfielder, while playing for the Louisiana Ragin' Cajuns softball team. She is the Sun Belt Conference career leader in runs and led the Ragin' Cajuns to four consecutive NCAA Division I softball tournament appearances from 2014 to 2017, including an appearance in the Women's College World Series in 2014, where they lost to Oklahoma, 3–1.

== Statistics ==
Louisiana Ragin' Cajuns
| YEAR | G | AB | R | H | BA | RBI | HR | 3B | 2B | TB | SLG | BB | SO | SB | SBA |
| 2014 | 60 | 211 | 60 | 70 | .331 | 55 | 15 | 1 | 14 | 131 | .621% | 23 | 19 | 6 | 7 |
| 2015 | 54 | 182 | 66 | 69 | .379 | 55 | 14 | 4 | 14 | 133 | .731% | 26 | 14 | 9 | 9 |
| 2016 | 55 | 187 | 63 | 70 | .374 | 47 | 8 | 0 | 11 | 105 | .561% | 21 | 9 | 9 | 9 |
| 2017 | 55 | 178 | 62 | 68 | .382 | 57 | 12 | 1 | 13 | 119 | .669% | 30 | 14 | 5 | 8 |
| TOTALS | 224 | 758 | 251 | 277 | .365 | 214 | 49 | 6 | 52 | 488 | .644% | 100 | 56 | 29 | 33 |
