= Brownsville, Louisiana =

- Unincorporated community
- Location of Brownsville in Ouachita Parish, Louisiana.

- Location within Louisiana Location within the United States
- Coordinates: 32°29′34″N 92°09′26″W
- Country: United States
- State: Louisiana
- Parish: Ouachita

Area
  - Total: 3.47 sq mi (9.00 km^{2})
  - Land: 3.47 sq mi (9.00 km^{2})
  - Water: 0 sq mi (0.00 km^{2})
- Elevation: 85 ft (26 m)

Population (2020)
  - Total: 4,353
  - Density: 1,252.7/sq mi (483.68/km^{2})
- Time zone: UTC-6 (Central (CST))
  - Summer (DST): UTC-5 (CDT)
- ZIP code: 71292
- Area code: 318
- GNIS feature ID: 2586671

Brownsville is an unincorporated community and census-designated place in Ouachita Parish, Louisiana, United States. As of the 2020 census, Brownsville had a population of 4,353.

== Geography ==
According to the U.S. Census Bureau, the community has an area of 3.494 square miles (9.05 km^{2}), all land.

Prior to 2010, the Census Bureau included both Brownsville and Bawcomville in the Brownsville-Bawcomville census-designated place for statistical purposes.

== Demographics ==
Historical population
Census	Pop.	Note	%±
2010	4,317		—
2020	4,353		0.8%
U.S. Decennial Census

Brownsville first appeared in the 2010 U.S. census split out along with the Brownsville CDP from the deleted Brownsville-Bawcomville CDP.

=== 2020 census ===
As of the 2020 census, Brownsville had a population of 4,353. There were 1,831 households, including 834 families. The median age was 38.3 years. 23.5% of residents were under the age of 18 and 16.6% of residents were 65 years of age or older. For every 100 females there were 97.2 males, and for every 100 females age 18 and over there were 93.7 males age 18 and over.

100.0% of residents lived in urban areas, while 0.0% lived in rural areas.

Of households in Brownsville, 27.4% had children under the age of 18 living in them. Of all households, 29.2% were married-couple households, 25.7% were households with a male householder and no spouse or partner present, and 37.4% were households with a female householder and no spouse or partner present. About 34.5% of all households were made up of individuals and 14.5% had someone living alone who was 65 years of age or older.

There were 2,146 housing units, of which 14.7% were vacant. The homeowner vacancy rate was 2.0% and the rental vacancy rate was 15.4%.

Brownsville racial composition
Race	Number	Percentage
White (non-Hispanic)	2,370	54.45%
Black or African American (non-Hispanic)	1,227	28.19%
Native American	23	0.53%
Asian	28	0.64%
Pacific Islander	2	0.05%
Other/Mixed	192	4.41%
Hispanic or Latino	511	11.74%

== Education ==
Ouachita Parish School System is the area school district.

Much of Brownsville CDP is zoned to Riser Elementary School, while other parts are zoned to Riverbend Elementary School, and some parts to the southeast are zoned to Lenwil Elementary School. They feed into Riser Middle School and West Monroe High School.
