= Lolley =

Lolley is a surname. Notable people with the surname include:

- Joe Lolley (born 1992), English association football player
- Larry Lolley (1947–2018), American judge
- Phillip Lolley (born 1954), American football player and coach
