= Michael Hunter (American football) =

American football player (born 1993)

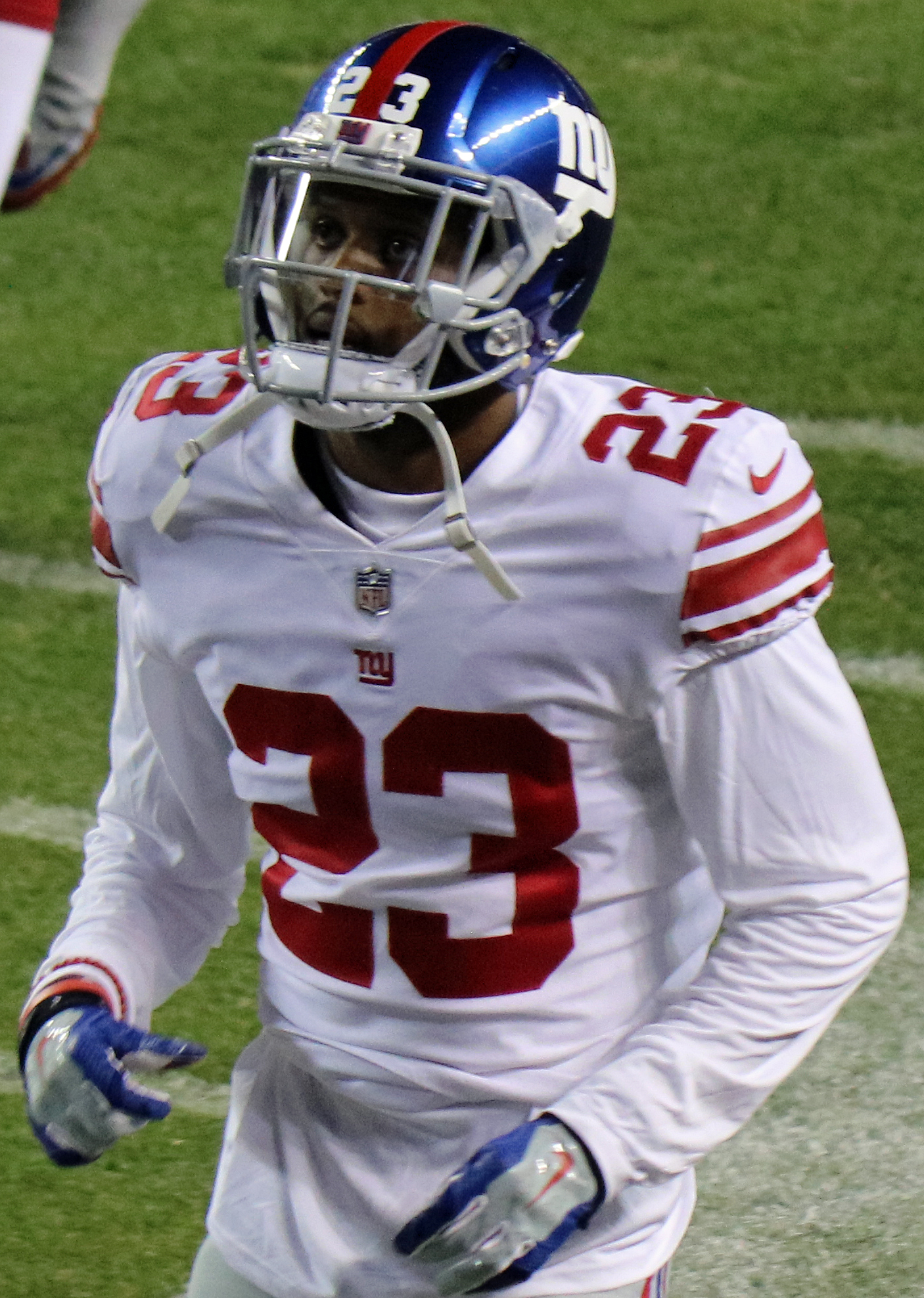
- Hunter with the New York Giants in 2017

Los Angeles Rams
- Title: Assistant defensive backs coach

Personal information
- Born: April 19, 1993 (age 33); Monroe, Louisiana, U.S.
- Listed height: 6 ft 0 in (1.83 m)
- Listed weight: 192 lb (87 kg)

Career information
- Position: Cornerback (No. 39, 23)
- High school: West Monroe (West Monroe, Louisiana)
- College: Indiana (2011–2014); Oklahoma State (2015)
- NFL draft: 2016: undrafted

Career history

Playing
- New York Giants (2016–2017); New York Jets (2017)*; Denver Broncos (2017); Buffalo Bills (2018)*; Houston Texans (2018)*; New York Giants (2019)*; Kansas City Chiefs (2019)*
- * Offseason or practice squad member only

Coaching
- Oklahoma State (2021–2022) Graduate assistant; Tulsa (2023) Cornerbacks coach; Ohio State (2024–2025) Assistant defensive backs coach; Los Angeles Rams (2026–present) Assistant defensive backs coach

Awards and highlights
- As an assistant coach CFP national champion (2024)

Career NFL statistics
- Total tackles: 4
- Stats at Pro Football Reference

Michael Dewayne Hunter Jr. (born April 19, 1993) is an American former professional football player who was a cornerback in the National Football League (NFL). He played college football for the Indiana Hoosiers prior to transferring to the Oklahoma State Cowboys. He was signed by the New York Giants as an undrafted free agent after the 2016 NFL draft.

== Early life ==
Hunter attended West Monroe High School where he lettered four times in football, he also lettered in basketball and track & field. He also had a 4.0 Grade point average (GPA). He was a member of the All-northeast Louisiana and All-district teams as a junior and senior. As an All-state cornerback, he recorded 44 tackles, two forced fumbles and three fumble recoveries, one interception and five passes defensed as a senior in 2010. He was also a member of the academic All-state team as well. He was ranked the 81st best cornerback in the nation by ESPN.com.

== College career ==
Hunter then attended Indiana University Bloomington, where he majored in exercise science.

As a freshman in 2011 he appeared in all 12 games with three starts. He recorded 13 tackles (nine solo) with passes defensed. As a sophomore in 2012, he redshirt. In 2013, as a redshirt sophomore, he started all 12 games. For the season he recorded 42 tackles (34 solo), three tackles-for-loss, one interception, seven passes defensed and once forced fumble. He was nan All-Big Ten academic selection. As a redshirt junior in 2014, he started all 12 games. He recorded 36 tackles (29 solo), 3.5 tackles-for-loss, one interception and five passes defensed. Again he was an academic All-Big Ten selection.

After graduating with a degree in exercise science from Indiana, he transferred to Oklahoma State University. In 2015, he appeared in 10 games and recorded 20 tackles (18 solo), one tackle-for-loss, one pass defensed and two interceptions.

== Professional career ==
Pre-draft measurables
Height	Weight	Arm length	Hand span	Wingspan	40-yard dash	10-yard split	20-yard split	20-yard shuttle	Three-cone drill	Vertical jump	Broad jump	Bench press
5 ft 11 7/8 in (1.83 m)	186 lb (84 kg)	32 in (0.81 m)	8 3/4 in (0.22 m)	6 ft 1 1/8 in (1.86 m)	4.40 s	1.58 s	2.58 s	4.29 s	7.27 s	38.5 in (0.98 m)	10 ft 1 in (3.07 m)	17 reps
All values from Oklahoma State Pro Day

=== New York Giants (first stint) ===
After going undrafted in the 2016 NFL draft, Hunter signed with the New York Giants in May 2016. He was released on October 11, 2016. He was re-signed to a reserve/futures contract on January 9, 2017.

On October 17, 2017, Hunter was waived/injured by the Giants after suffering a hamstring injury in Week 6 and was placed on injured reserve. He was released on October 23, 2017.

=== New York Jets ===
On November 11, 2017, Hunter was signed to the New York Jets' practice squad. He was released on November 24, 2017.

=== Denver Broncos ===
On November 29, 2017, Hunter was signed to the Denver Broncos' practice squad. He was promoted to the active roster on December 19, 2017.

On September 1, 2018, Hunter was waived by the Broncos.

=== Buffalo Bills ===
On September 18, 2018, Hunter was signed to the Buffalo Bills' practice squad. He was released on October 9, 2018.

=== Houston Texans ===
On December 26, 2018, Hunter was signed to the Houston Texans practice squad.

=== New York Giants (second stint) ===
On January 17, 2019, Hunter signed a reserve/future contract with the New York Giants. He was waived on May 6, 2019.

=== Kansas City Chiefs ===
On July 31, 2019, Hunter signed with the Kansas City Chiefs. He was waived with an injury designation August 31, 2019. After clearing waivers, he was placed on the Chiefs' injured reserve. He was waived from injured reserve with an injury settlement on September 4.

== Career statistics ==
=== NFL ===
Year	Team	Games		Tackles					Interceptions						Fumbles		
Year	Team	GP	GS	Total	Solo	Ast	Sck	Sfty	PD	Int	Yds	Avg	Lng	TD	FF	FR	TD
2016	NYG	2	0	4	4	0	0.0	0	0	0	0	0.0	0	0	0	0	0
2017	NYG	4	0	0	0	0	0.0	0	0	0	0	0.0	0	0	0	0	0
Career		6	0	4	4	0	0.0	0	0	0	0	0.0	0	0	0	0	0

=== College ===
Year	Team	Games		Tackles				Interceptions				Fumbles		
Year	Team	GP	GS	Total	Solo	Ast	Sack	PD	Int	Yds	TD	FF	FR	TD
2011	Indiana	12	3	13	9	4	0.0	2	0	0	0	0	0	0
2012	Indiana	0	0	DNP										
2013	Indiana	12	12	42	34	8	0.0	7	1	28	0	1	0	0
2014	Indiana	12	12	36	29	7	0.0	5	1	0	0	0	0	0
2015	Oklahoma State	13	6	20	18	2	0.0	1	2	8	0	0	0	0
Career		49	33	111	90	21	0.0	15	4	36	0	1	0	0
