= Richwood, Louisiana =

- Town
- Town of Richwood
- Location of Richwood in Ouachita Parish, Louisiana.

- Location of Louisiana in the United States
- Coordinates: 32°26′55″N 92°04′38″W
- Country: United States
- State: Louisiana
- Parish: Ouachita

Government
  - Mayor: Gerald Brown, Sr. (D)

Area
  - Total: 2.52 sq mi (6.52 km^{2})
  - Land: 2.52 sq mi (6.52 km^{2})
  - Water: 0 sq mi (0.00 km^{2})
- Elevation: 69 ft (21 m)

Population (2020)
  - Total: 3,881
  - Density: 1,542.8/sq mi (595.66/km^{2})
- Time zone: UTC-6 (CST)
  - Summer (DST): UTC-5 (CDT)
- ZIP code: 71202
- Area code: 318
- FIPS code: 22-64660
- GNIS feature ID: 2407210
- Website: www.townofrichwood.com

Richwood is a town in Ouachita Parish, Louisiana, United States. The town was incorporated December 31, 1974, under the provision of Louisiana Revised Statute 33:52 and operates under a form of government consisting of an elected mayor and a board of alder persons, which has five elected members. The town provides garbage collection, street maintenance, drainage maintenance, and other health and welfare services, in addition to the administrative services provided to its residents. As of the 2020 census, Richwood had a population of 3,881.

== Geography ==
Richwood is located in the southern portion of Ouachita Parish of Northeast Louisiana.

According to the United States Census Bureau, the town has a total area of 2.3 square miles (6.0 km^{2}), all land.

== Demographics ==
Historical population
Census	Pop.	Note	%±
1980	1,223		—
1990	1,253		2.5%
2000	2,115		68.8%
2010	3,392		60.4%
2020	3,881		14.4%
2025 (est.)	3,834	▼	−1.2%
U.S. Decennial Census

=== 2020 census ===
As of the 2020 census, Richwood had a population of 3,881. The median age was 33.9 years. 13.4% of residents were under the age of 18 and 6.0% of residents were 65 years of age or older. For every 100 females there were 105.5 males, and for every 100 females age 18 and over there were 108.0 males age 18 and over.

97.8% of residents lived in urban areas, while 2.2% lived in rural areas.

There were 575 households in Richwood, including 348 families. Of all households, 46.3% had children under the age of 18 living in them. Married-couple households made up 19.3% of households, 20.3% were households with a male householder and no spouse or partner present, and 54.4% were households with a female householder and no spouse or partner present. About 25.5% of all households were made up of individuals and 8.2% had someone living alone who was 65 years of age or older.

There were 675 housing units, of which 14.8% were vacant. The homeowner vacancy rate was 0.0% and the rental vacancy rate was 6.9%.

Richwood racial composition
Race	Number	Percentage
White (non-Hispanic)	522	13.45%
Black or African American (non-Hispanic)	2,278	58.7%
Native American	5	0.13%
Asian	229	5.9%
Other/Mixed	60	1.55%
Hispanic or Latino	787	20.28%

== Education ==
Ouachita Parish School System is the area school district.

Most of Richwood is in the zone for Robinson Elementary School while small pieces are zoned to Swayze Elementary School. Both feed into Richwood Middle and Richwood High School.

== See also ==
- KHLL
- Verdiacee Goston
