= Tommy Banks (American football) =

American football player

No. 43
- Position: Fullback

Personal information
- Born: c. 1979 (age 46–47); West Monroe, Louisiana, U.S.

Career information
- High school: West Monroe
- College: LSU (1997–2000)

Tommy Banks (born c. 1979) is an American former football fullback.

Born in West Monroe, Louisiana, he starred at West Monroe High School under legendary coach Don Shows before earning a scholarship to Louisiana State University, where he played from 1997 to 2000. Banks cemented his place in LSU lore by scoring a touchdown in an upset win over the top ranked and defending national champion Florida Gators in 1997. On the play, he dived into the end zone with a defender draped on him, for a 7-yard touchdown that put LSU up 14–0. The dive was immortalized in the October 20, 1997, issue of Sports Illustrated, which contained an article recapping the game. Banks ended his LSU career with a record tying two touchdown performance in LSU's 28–14 victory over Georgia Tech in the 2000 Peach Bowl.
