= Louisiana Highway 136 =

State highway in Louisiana, United States

Louisiana Highway 136

- Route of LA 136 highlighted in red

Route information
- Maintained by Louisiana DOTD
- Length: 3.499 mi (5.631 km)
- Existed: 1955 renumbering–present

Major junctions
- South end: LA 134 in Fairbanks
- North end: US 165 / LA 2 in Sterlington

Location
- Country: United States
- State: Louisiana
- Parishes: Ouachita

Highway system
- Louisiana State Highway System; Interstate; US; State; Scenic
← LA 135	→ LA 137
← SR C-1603	C-1604	→ SR C-1605

Louisiana Highway 136 (LA 136) is a state highway located in Ouachita Parish, Louisiana that runs 3.50 miles (5.63 km) in a north–south direction from LA 134 at Fairbanks to a junction with U.S. Highway 165 (US 165) and LA 2 at the eastern limit of Sterlington.

The route, along with the western end of LA 134, makes a loop off of US 165 that passes through the small community of Fairbanks, which is located between Monroe and Sterlington in northern Ouachita Parish.

== Route description ==
From the south, LA 136 begins at an intersection with LA 134 in the small community of Fairbanks. At this intersection, LA 134 turns east away from Fairbanks while LA 136 proceeds straight ahead in a northerly direction and crosses the Arkansas, Louisiana and Mississippi Railroad (ALM) line at a point known as Fowler. LA 134 parallels Bayou De Siard along a sharp bend to the west at Guthrie. It reaches its eastern terminus soon afterward at an intersection with US 165 and LA 2 at the eastern edge of Sterlington. From this intersection, US 165 and LA 2 travel northeast in a concurrency to Bastrop. Just southwest of the intersection, the two highways split and head toward Monroe and Sterlington, respectively.

The route is classified as a rural local road by the Louisiana Department of Transportation and Development (La DOTD) with an average daily traffic volume of 700 vehicles. LA 136 is an undivided, two-lane highway for its entire length with a posted speed limit of 55 mph (90 km/h), reduced to 35 mph (55 km/h) through Fairbanks.

== History ==
=== Pre-1955 route numbering ===
State Route C-1604
- Location: Ouachita Parish
- Length: 3.5 mi (5.6 km)
- Existed: c. 1940s–1955

In the original Louisiana Highway system in use between 1921 and 1955, the modern route of LA 136 was designated as State Route C-1604. The route was added after 1937 and carried a "C-" prefix, having been numbered by the state highway department. (Routes ceased to be numbered by acts of the state legislature after 1930.)

In the pre-1955 system, Route C-1604 began at Route 1294 in Fairbanks and continued northward to US 165 and Route 11 east of Sterlington. The route remained the same until the 1955 Louisiana Highway renumbering.

=== Post-1955 route history ===
LA 136 was created in 1955 as direct renumbering of State Route C-1604.

La 136—From a junction with La-US 165 near Sterlington through or near Guthrie to a junction with La 134 at or near Fairbanks.

— 1955 legislative route description

Since the 1955 renumbering, the route of LA 136 has remained the same. In 1961, the community of Sterlington was incorporated, and the northern terminus of LA 136 now touches the southeastern town limit.

== Future ==
La DOTD is currently engaged in a program that aims to transfer about 5,000 miles (8,000 km) of state-owned roadways to local governments over the next several years. Under this plan of "right-sizing" the state highway system, the entire route of LA 136 is proposed for deletion as it does not meet a significant interurban travel function.

== Major intersections ==
Note: The mileposts for LA 136 increase from north to south contrary to common practice.
The entire highway is in Ouachita Parish.

Location	mi	km	Destinations	Notes
Fairbanks	3.499	5.631	LA 134	Southern terminus
Sterlington	0.016– 0.000	0.026– 0.000	US 165 / LA 2 – Bastrop, Monroe	Northern terminus
1.000 mi = 1.609 km; 1.000 km = 0.621 mi
