= Lakeshore, Louisiana =

- Unincorporated community
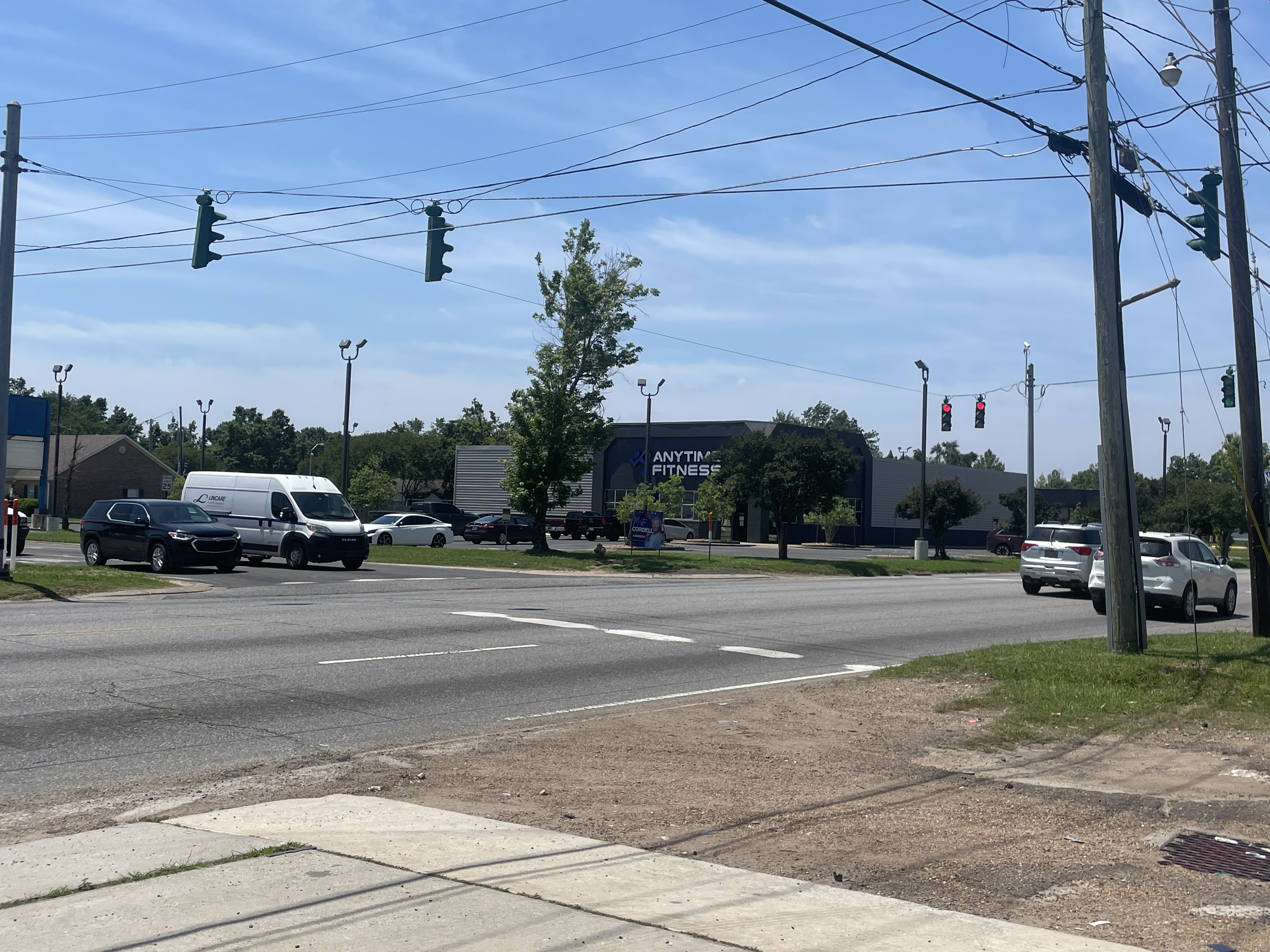

- Location of Lakeshore in Ouachita Parish, Louisiana.

- Location within Louisiana Location within the United States
- Coordinates: 32°32′06″N 92°01′58″W
- Country: United States
- State: Louisiana
- Parish: Ouachita

Area
  - Total: 0.94 sq mi (2.43 km^{2})
  - Land: 0.85 sq mi (2.20 km^{2})
  - Water: 0.093 sq mi (0.24 km^{2})
- Elevation: 79 ft (24 m)

Population (2020)
  - Total: 1,988
  - Density: 2,342.0/sq mi (904.26/km^{2})
- Time zone: UTC-6 (Central (CST))
  - Summer (DST): UTC-5 (CDT)
- ZIP code: 71203
- Area code: 318
- GNIS feature ID: 2586690

Lakeshore is an unincorporated community and census-designated place in Ouachita Parish, Louisiana, United States. As of the 2020 census, Lakeshore had a population of 1,988. The community is located on the south bank of Bayou Desiard, east of Monroe.

== Geography ==
According to the U.S. Census Bureau, the community has an area of 0.944 square miles (2.44 km^{2}); 0.853 square miles (2.21 km^{2}) of its area is land, and 0.091 square miles (0.24 km^{2}) is water.

== Demographics ==
Historical population
Census	Pop.	Note	%±
2010	1,930		—
2020	1,988		3.0%
U.S. Decennial Census

Lakeshore first appeared as a census designated place in the 2010 U.S. census.

=== 2020 census ===
Lakeshore racial composition
Race	Number	Percentage
White (non-Hispanic)	987	49.65%
Black or African American (non-Hispanic)	843	42.4%
Native American	1	0.05%
Asian	24	1.21%
Pacific Islander	1	0.05%
Other/Mixed	75	3.77%
Hispanic or Latino	57	2.87%

As of the 2020 United States census, there were 1,988 people, 842 households, and 480 families residing in the CDP.

== Education ==
The school district is Ouachita Parish School District.

It is zoned to Lakeshore Elementary School and East Ouachita Middle School. This area feeds into Ouachita Parish High School.
