= Redneck Christmas Parade =

Christmas parade in Bawcomville, Louisiana

- Frequency: Annually
- Location: Bawcomville, Louisiana
- Country: United States
- Years active: 20
- Inaugurated: 2006
- Website: Redneck Christmas Parade

The Bawcomville Redneck Christmas Parade is a Christmas parade held annually in Bawcomville, Louisiana, a suburb of Monroe, in early December. It is sponsored by Mann Family Charities as a fundraiser for other local nonprofits and families in need.

The parade primarily features pickup trucks, tractors, horses, and all-terrain vehicles adorned with Christmas decorations. Parade participants often dress in stereotypical redneck attire or costumes, often with an added Christmas theme. Many floats throw candy, beads, and even household essentials to spectators.

The first Redneck Christmas Parade was held in 2006 and the parade route is an approximately 1.5 mile loop, beginning and ending at Riser Elementary School, and going along Smith Street, Jonesboro Road, and New Natchitoches Road.
