= Kiroli Park =

Park in West Monroe, Louisiana

- Interactive map of Kiroli Park
- Type: Urban park
- Location: West Monroe, Louisiana
- Coordinates: 32°32′51″N 92°09′53″W
- Area: 92.16 acres (37.30 ha)
- Operator: City of West Monroe
- Open: 7 a.m. to 8 p.m. daily
- Status: open

Kiroli Park is a city park located in West Monroe, Louisiana, and operated by the City of West Monroe. It is located on Kiroli Road in the far north part of the city. It is the largest municipal park in the Monroe metropolitan area.

Kiroli Park charges an admission of $1 per person with an annual membership available at $100.

== History ==
Kiroli Park originated as a Boy Scout camp. In 1925, 40 members of the Kiwanis, Rotary and Lions clubs contributed $100 each to buy land for the Ouachita Council of the Boy Scouts. The name "Kiroli" was formed from the first two letters of the three organizations: Kiwanis, Rotary and Lions.

During the Great Mississippi Flood of 1927, Camp Kiroli was used as a refugee and work camp. Ouachita Parish officials and the Red Cross used the camp from April to August 1927, and buildings constructed for relief workers later became Boy Scout cabins at the site.

The site was known as Camp Kiroli during its use by the Boy Scouts. Early facilities included a playing field, a campfire area, a headquarters building and a swimming hole; a swimming pool was added in the 1950s. The Boy Scouts used Camp Kiroli as an official camp until the summer of 1974, after which the property was placed for sale.

After the Boy Scouts placed Camp Kiroli up for sale, local supporters began the Kiroli Woods Acquisition Project to preserve the land as a public park. The Ouachita Parish Police Jury secured a matching grant through the Louisiana Office of State Parks for half of the $465,834 purchase price, and a "Save Camp Kiroli Day" was held on October 25, 1975, to build public support for the purchase.

In 1987, after funding issues and reduced park operations under the Police Jury, the property was transferred to the City of West Monroe. The Police Jury authorized the donation on March 2, 1987, West Monroe accepted the donation on March 10, and the park became city property on April 2, 1987.

The Kiroli Foundation, a nonprofit 501(c)(3), supports Kiroli Park and other West Monroe parks. Its events have included the Northeast Louisiana Celtic Festival and Christmas at Kiroli.

In 2026, Kiroli Park was closed after damage from Winter Storm Fern. The City of West Monroe said the park was closed until further notice, and KNOE reported in May 2026 that officials expected the park to reopen in late summer after restoration work.

== Features ==
Kiroli Park includes playgrounds, a botanical garden, a dog park, tennis and pickleball courts, gardens, picnic areas, fishing ponds, mountain bike trails and hiking trails. Much of the park is wooded, with paved roads and trails leading to features including a suspension bridge, covered bridge, observation tower and elevated walkways.

The park has several rental facilities, including a lodge, picnic shelters, an amphitheater near the pond, a covered bandstand, the Garden Room and Camellia Cottage near the Sunken Gardens.

The Raising Cane's Dog Park is located near Til's Trail inside Kiroli Park. It is divided into areas for large dogs and for dogs under 25 pounds or with special needs.

Civitan Smiles Park, an inclusive playground within Kiroli Park, opened in 2017. The playground was developed as a fair-themed play area for children of all abilities. The project was led by the West Monroe Civitan Club and has been described as a 20,000-square-foot, $1 million playground.
