= Ouachita Parish High School =

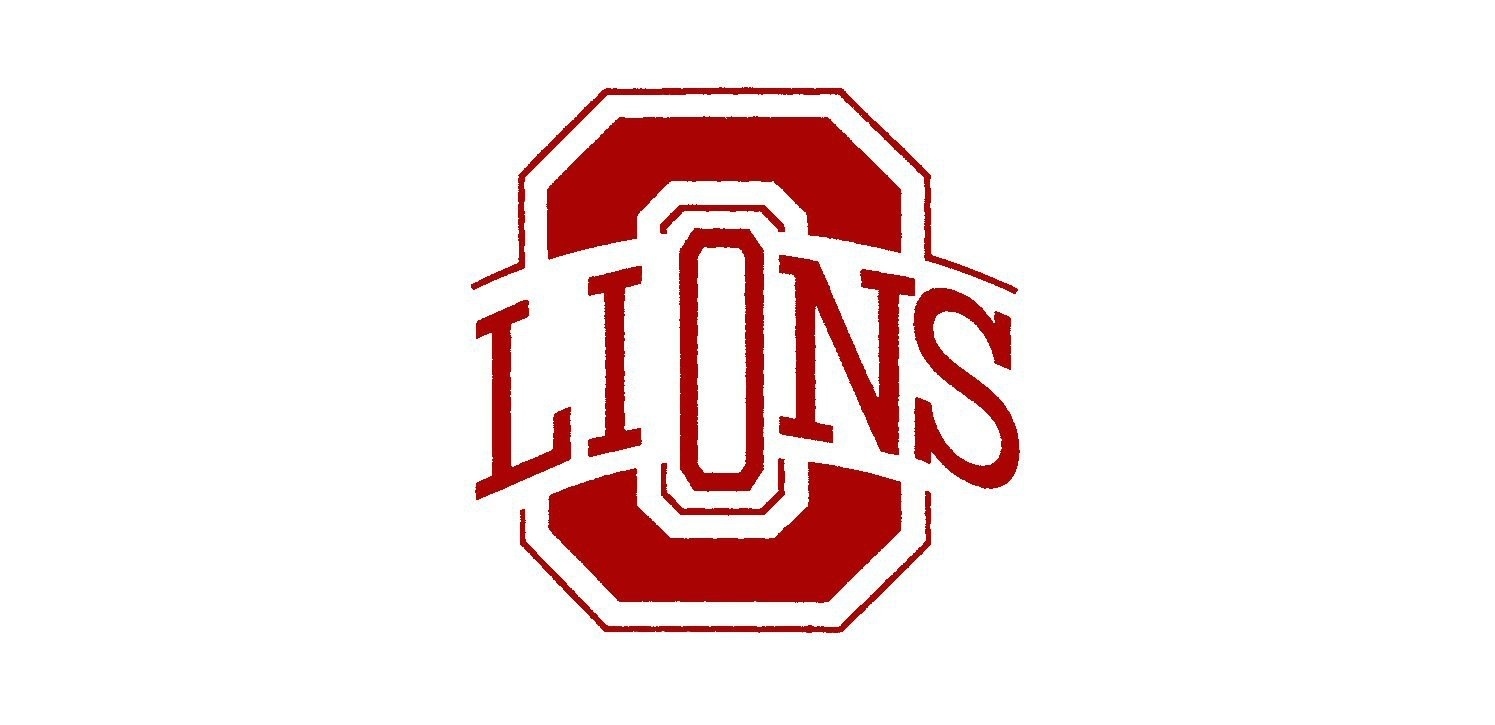

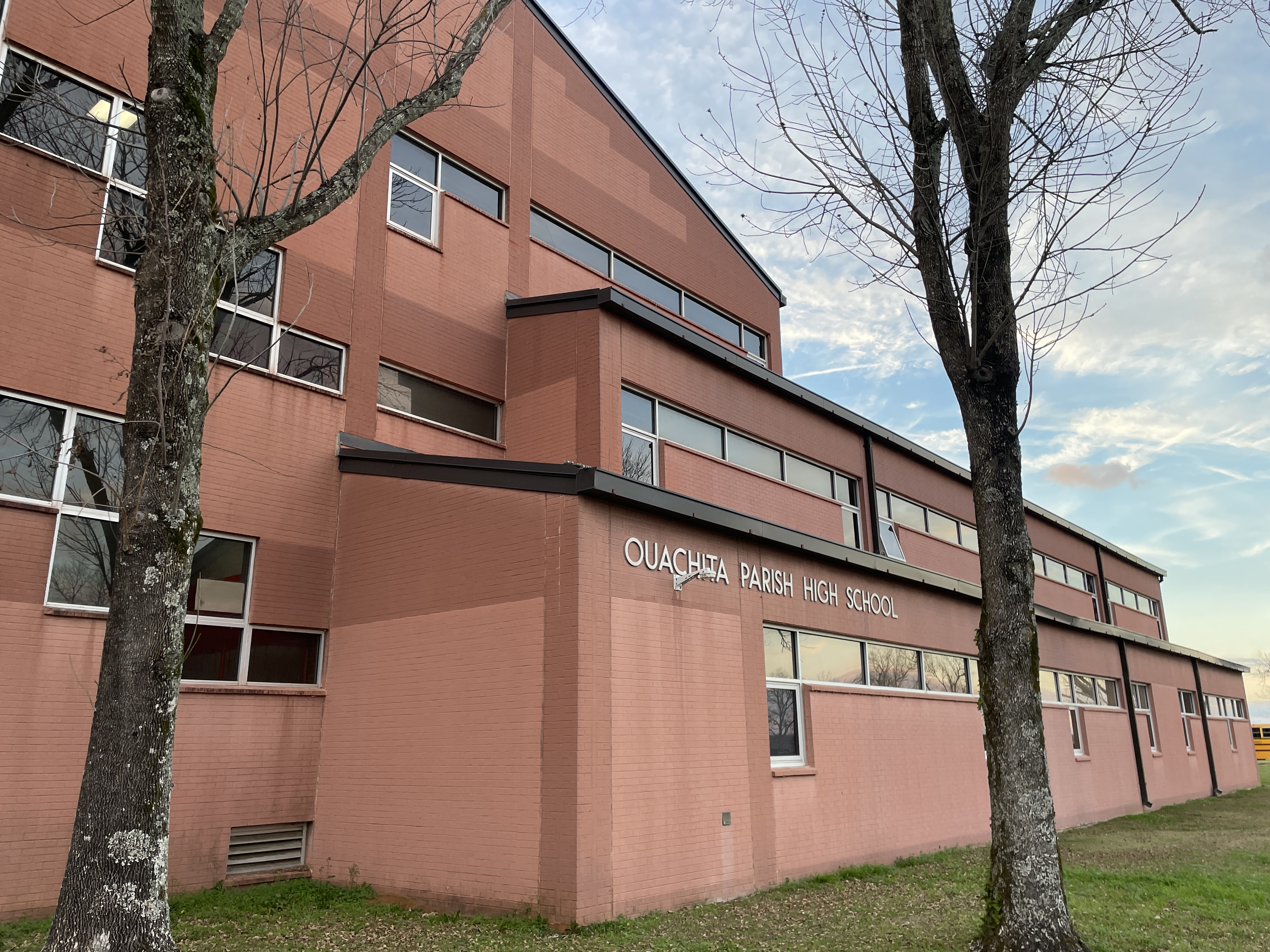
- Ouachita Parish High School, located in unincorporated Ouachita Parish, Louisiana

Location
- 681 Highway 594; Monroe address, Louisiana 71203; United States; 32.502°N 91.991°W

Information
- Type: Public
- Motto: Strong Alone, Unstoppable Together
- Established: 1894 (132 years ago)
- School district: Ouachita Parish School Board
- Principal: Charles Wright
- Teaching staff: 75.52 (FTE)
- Grades: 9–12
- Enrollment: 1,190 (2023-2024)
- Colors: Cardinal and White
- Mascot: Lions
- Nickname: The O, OPHS; Madhouse on Milhaven; O-block
- Rival: West Monroe High School, Neville High School, Ruston High School
- Accreditation: Southern Association of Colleges and Schools
- Yearbook: The Roarer
- Website: https://ouachitahigh.opsb.net
- Ouachita Parish High School
- U.S. National Register of Historic Places
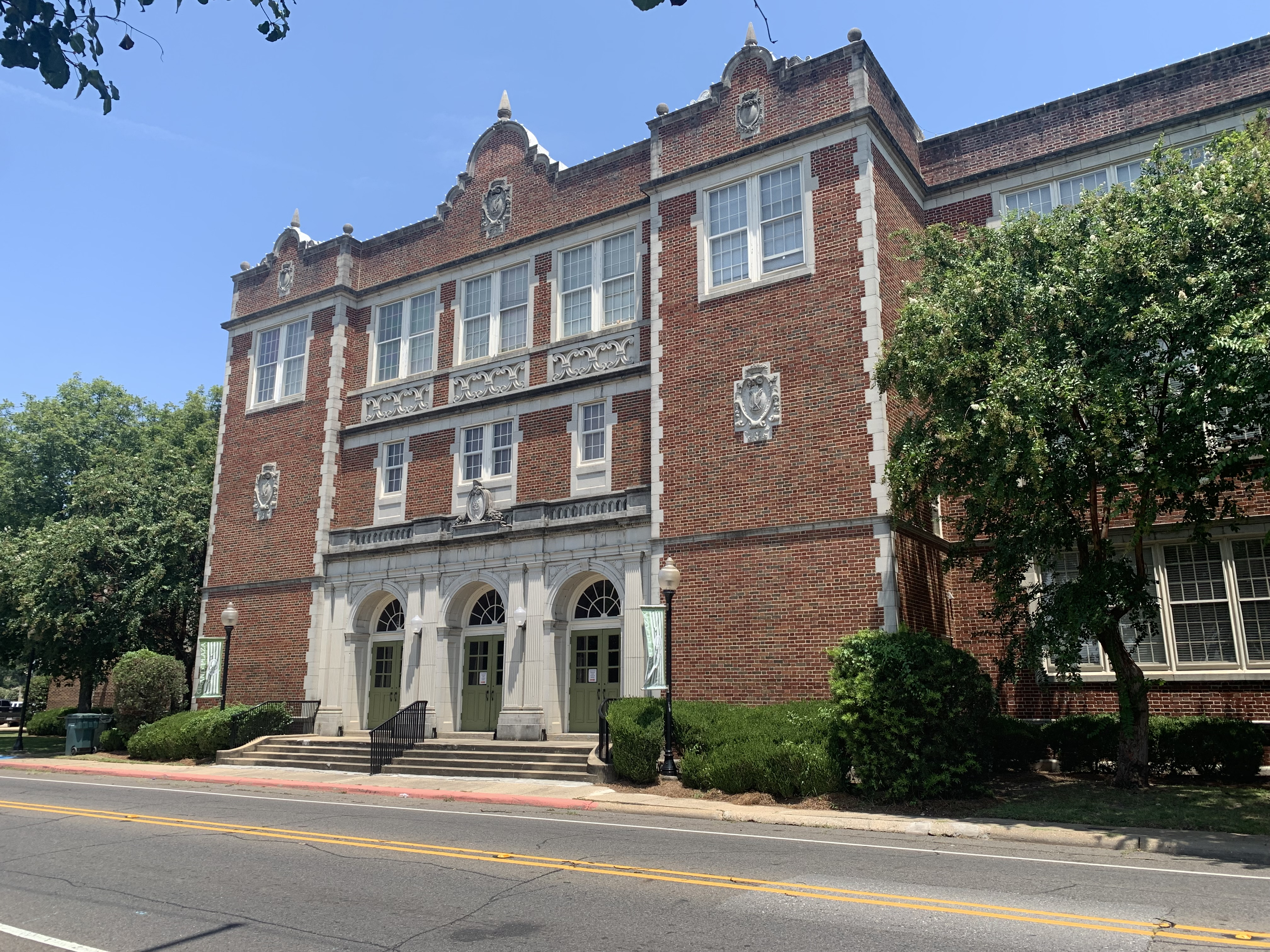
- The 1924 building, now the Ouachita Grand Plaza

- Location within Louisiana
- Location: 500 S. Grand St., Monroe, Louisiana
- Coordinates: 32°29′52″N 92°06′58″W
- Architectural style: Jacobean Revival
- NRHP reference No.: 81000297
- Added to NRHP: April 9, 1981

Ouachita Parish High School is a public high school located an unincorporated area of Ouachita Parish, Louisiana, United States, with a Monroe postal address. The school is administered by the Ouachita Parish School Board and is fully accredited by the Southern Association of Colleges and Schools. The school's mascot is the Lion.

== History ==
Ouachita Parish High School, founded in 1894, holds the distinction of being the oldest school in northeast Louisiana. Over its long history, the school has occupied four different buildings, with the second location being registered on the National Register of Historic Places.

The first Ouachita Parish High School was established in 1895 between St. John and South Grand Streets in downtown Monroe, near the Ouachita River. Later, a new three-story building was erected, which was constructed in stages between 1924 and 1937. In 1957, primary and middle school classes were relocated from the original 1890s building, which was subsequently used for storage before being demolished in the early 1960s to make way for Interstate Highway 20.

The school's current location, at 681 LA-594, was completed in 1986 in Millhaven. The original building is now the Ouchita Grand Plaza, a senior housing complex.

== Athletics ==
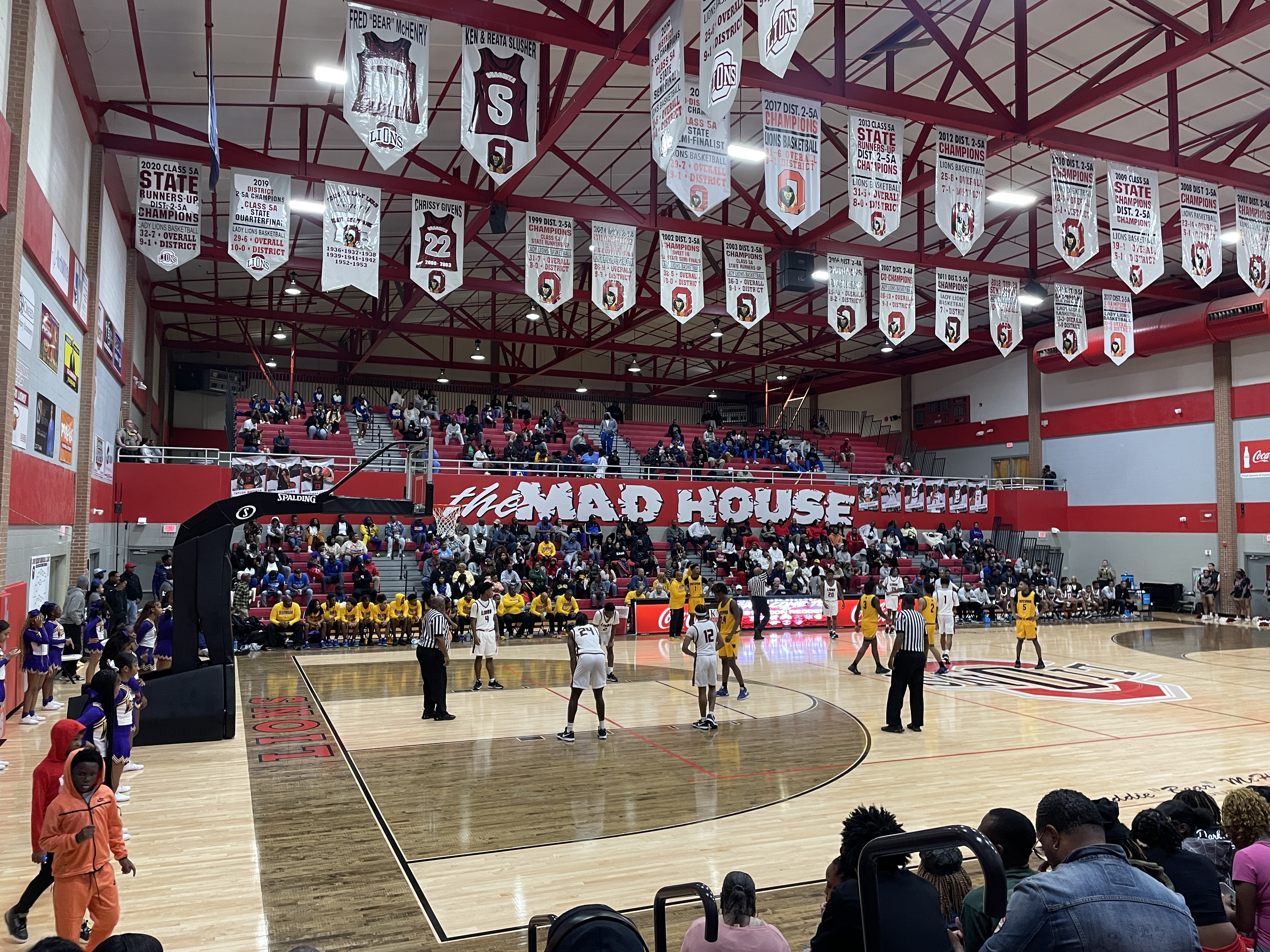
Ouachita Parish High School Lions basketball team playing Wossman High School at the Mad House Gymnasium during the 31st annual Don Redden Memorial Classic.

Ouachita Parish High School's athletics teams compete in the LHSAA. The Lions participate in district 2-5A and Louisiana 5A.

=== Football ===
Ouachita's football team has achieved significant success, winning the state championship in 1989 and finishing as runner-up in 1941 and 1994. The rivalry with West Monroe High School is famously known as the "Rebel-Lion" rivalry, referencing the mascots of the two schools, Rebels and Lions. In 2021, Ouachita Parish High School's football team ended West Monroe High School's twenty-seven-game district winning streak by defeating them 35–34 in double overtime, a significant achievement for the school.

=== Championships ===
Football Championships

- (2) State Championships: 1989, 2025

== Dance team ==
The Ouachita Dandylions is the dance team representing Ouachita Parish High School. The Dandylions participate in state competitions held annually in Lafayette, Louisiana.

== Band ==
The Pride of Ouachita Marching Band is one of the high school marching bands in the Monroe-West Monroe Area. In 2014, the band completed its 11th year of receiving all superior ratings in competition and was awarded "Overall Best Band in Class" for four consecutive years from 2010 to 2014.

== Feeder patterns ==
The school takes students from the boundaries of Jack Hayes, Lakeshore, and Swartz elementary schools, which are also in the boundaries of Ouachita Junior High School and East Ouachita Middle School.

== Notable alumni ==
- Monti Sharp (Class of 1985), Emmy Award-Winning Actor
- William Derwood Cann, Jr. (Class of 1937), World War II lieutenant colonel and mayor of Monroe from 1978 to 1979
- Julie Giroux, composer
- Jarrius Jackson, former professional basketball player
- Larry Lolley, judge
- Wojciech Myrda, former professional basketball player
- Josh Newton, NFL Player
- William Wiley Norris, III (Class of 1954, 1936-2016), city, state, and circuit court judge from West Monroe
- Robert E. Powell, former mayor of Monroe, Louisiana
- Don Redden, former professional basketball player
- Cam Sims, American football player for the Las Vegas Raiders
- Jalen Tolliver, professional football player
- Jonathan Wilhite, former professional football player
- J. Robert Wooley (Class of 1971), Louisiana insurance commissioner from 2000 to 2006
- Elise Baughman, voice actress

== Notable faculty ==
- Pat Patterson, baseball coach from 1958 to 1963, former Louisiana Tech baseball coach

== See also ==
- List of high schools in Louisiana
