= Louisiana Highway 840 =

State highway in Louisiana, United States

Louisiana Highway 840

- Routes of the two current sections of LA 840 in red

Route information
- Maintained by Louisiana DOTD

Location
- Country: United States
- State: Louisiana
- Parishes: Ouachita

Highway system
- Louisiana State Highway System; Interstate; US; State; Scenic
← LA 838	→ LA 841

Louisiana Highway 840 is a collection of two current state highways which serve Monroe and West Monroe in Ouachita Parish, and three deleted state highways.

== Current routes ==
=== Louisiana Highway 840-1 ===
Louisiana Highway 840-1
- Location: West Monroe
- Length: 1.23 mi (1.98 km)

Louisiana Highway 840-1 (LA 840-1) spans 1.23 miles (1.98 km) from west to east and is known as Smith Street. It connects LA 3033 to LA 34. Before the 1955 Louisiana Highway renumbering, LA 840-1 was signed as State Route 2185. It also served as the southern terminus of LA 617, signed as State Route 1607. The northern terminus of LA 617 has since been shifted north by two blocks.

Junction list

The entire highway is in West Monroe, Ouachita Parish.

mi	km	Destinations	Notes
0.00	0.00	LA 3033 (Washington St.)	Western terminus
1.23	1.98	LA 34 (Jonesboro Rd.)	Eastern terminus
1.000 mi = 1.609 km; 1.000 km = 0.621 mi

=== Louisiana Highway 840-6 ===
Louisiana Highway 840-6
- Location: Monroe
- Length: 3.93 mi (6.32 km)

Louisiana Highway 840-6 (LA 840-6) spans 3.93 miles (6.32 km) from south to north and is known as North 18th Street and Forsythe Avenue. From the west, LA 840-6 begins as a state highway at an intersection with US 80/US 165 Business in Monroe. It heads north as a four-lane highway. The roadway south of this intersection is signed as TO I-20, and is known as North 18th Street.

Heading north, LA 840-6 passes through many banks and restaurants. It turns to the right at an intersection with Forsythe Avenue, which picks up LA 840-6 and heads east. Forsythe Avenue has many upscale shops and restaurants and is one of the prized thoroughfares through Monroe.

After crossing Bayou DeSiard, Forsythe Avenue turns into Forsythe Bypass, carrying LA 840-6 to its eastern terminus at US 165.

Before the 1955 Louisiana Highway renumbering, LA 840-6 was signed as State Route 1927; it followed along Forsythe Avenue, however, instead of Forsythe Extension.

Junction list

The entire highway is in Monroe, Ouachita Parish.

mi	km	Destinations	Notes
0.00	0.00	US 80 / US 165 Bus. (Louisville Avenue)	Western terminus
3.14	5.05	LA 3284 (Forsythe Avenue TO US 165)	
3.93	6.32	US 165 – Sterlington	Eastern terminus
1.000 mi = 1.609 km; 1.000 km = 0.621 mi

== Deleted routes ==
=== Louisiana Highway 840-3 ===
Louisiana Highway 840-3
- Location: West Monroe
- Length: 1.83 mi (2.95 km)
- Existed: 1962

Louisiana Highway 840-3 (LA 840-3) was a state highway in West Monroe. It spanned 1.83 miles (2.95 km) from south to north and is currently known as North 7th Street. It connected LA 34 on its original routing along Natchitoches Street to US 80. LA 840-3 was removed when LA 34 was rerouted along its current path, and the piece north of LA 34 was designated as a southern extension of LA 143.

Junction list

The entire highway was in West Monroe, Ouachita Parish.

mi	km	Destinations	Notes
0.00	0.00	LA 34 (Natchitoches St.)	Southern terminus
1.83	2.95	US 80 / LA 15 (Cypress St.) / LA 143 (North 7th Street)	Northern terminus
1.000 mi = 1.609 km; 1.000 km = 0.621 mi

=== Louisiana Highway 840-4 ===
Louisiana Highway 840-4
- Location: Monroe
- Length: 0.72 mi (1,160 m)
- Existed: 1965

Louisiana Highway 840-4 (LA 840-4) was a state highway in Monroe. It spanned 0.72 miles (1.16 km) from south to north and is currently known as South Grand Street. It connected US 165 Business to Vernon Street, providing access to the Louisiana Institute for Boys and E.A. Conway Medical Center, which US 165 bypassed when it was rerouted along Jackson Street. LA 840-4 was removed sometime in the mid-1960s.

Junction list

The entire highway was in Monroe, Ouachita Parish.

mi	km	Destinations	Notes
0.00	0.00	US 165 (Jackson St.)	Southern terminus
0.72	1.16	Vernon Street	Northern terminus
1.000 mi = 1.609 km; 1.000 km = 0.621 mi

=== Louisiana Highway 840-5 ===
Louisiana Highway 840-5
- Location: Monroe
- Length: 0.74 mi (1,190 m)
- Existed: 1957

Louisiana Highway 840-5 (LA 840-5) was a state highway in Monroe. It spanned 0.74 miles (1.19 km) from west to east and is currently known as Desiard Street. It connected downtown Monroe to US 165, but was eventually truncated before the 1955 Louisiana Highway renumbering to 26th Street. When LA 840-5 was created, it connected North 26th Street to US 165. It was deleted in 1957.

Junction list

The entire highway was in Monroe, Ouachita Parish.

mi	km	Destinations	Notes
0.00	0.00	North 26th Street	Western terminus
0.74	1.19	US 80 (Louisville Ave.) / US 165	Eastern terminus
1.000 mi = 1.609 km; 1.000 km = 0.621 mi
