= West Monroe High School =

Public high school in West Monroe, Louisiana, United States

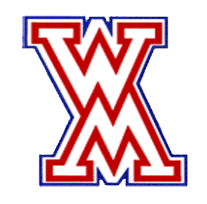

Location
- 201 Riggs Street; West Monroe, (Ouachita Parish), Louisiana 71291; United States; 32.5115°N 92.13896°W

Information
- Type: Public
- Motto: Great is the truth, and it will prevail.
- Established: 1953 (73 years ago)
- School district: Ouachita Parish School Board
- Principal: Dan Lane
- Teaching staff: 130.16 (FTE)
- Grades: 9–12
- Enrollment: 2,160 (2023–2024)
- Student to teacher ratio: 16.59
- Colors: Red and Navy
- Athletics conference: LHSAA District 2-5A
- Mascot: Rebel
- Nickname: Rebels
- Rival: Ouachita Lions; Neville Tigers; Ruston Bearcats
- Yearbook: Rebelaire
- Website: www.gorebs.org

West Monroe High School is a high school in West Monroe, Louisiana, United States. It is administered by the Ouachita Parish School Board. WMHS is fully accredited by the Southern Association of Colleges and Schools. The school's mascot is The Rebel Man.

== History ==
In 2013, 87 percent of WMHS students who took the Advanced Placement test passed the examination, the highest rate in the state. Four thousand more students in Louisiana took the 2013 exam compared to the number doing so in 2012, the largest increase in participation of any state. Louisiana students taking the exam earned a collective 5,144 college credits, an increase of 25 percent over 2012.

== Extracurricular activities ==
=== Band ===
The band received consecutive Superior ratings at Marching and Concert festivals since 1966. The band consists of 200 students. In 2014, the band appeared in the London New Years Day Parade in Westminster, UK. The band has appeared in two Presidential Inaugural Parades, George W. Bush in 2005 and Donald Trump in 2017. The band was one of only 7 high school bands invited. The band has also been invited to the Louisiana Showcase of Marching Bands in 2014, 2015, 2016, 2017 and 2018. In those years, they placed 11th (2014), 6th (2015), 5th (2016), 9th (2017), and 3rd (2018,) in the state of Louisiana.

== Athletics ==
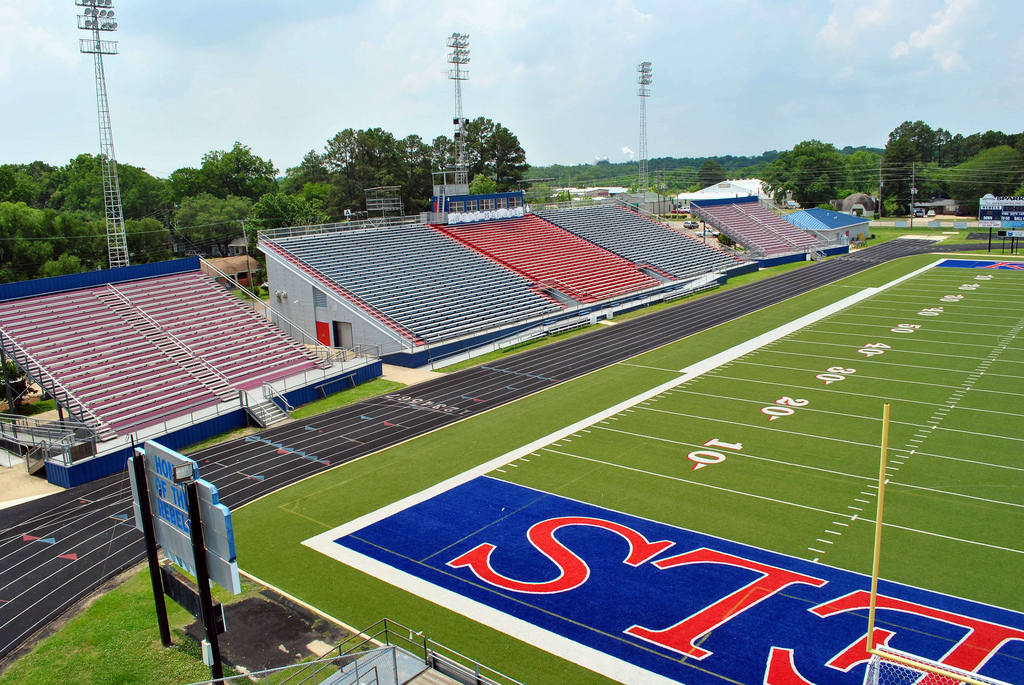
Don Shows Field at Rebel Stadium

West Monroe High athletics competes in the LHSAA.

=== Football ===
The school has won eight state championships and two national championships. The most recent state championship was in 2011 when they defeated Carencro (Lafayette) by a score of 20–13. The school has a fully outfitted football stadium named Rebel Stadium, which is mostly funded by the team's Rebel Booster Club. Artificial turf was installed on Don Shows Field in 2017.

Coaches

- Don Shows - LHSAA Hall of Fame Head Coach, Don Shows, won seventeen district and eight state championships ('93, '96, '97, '98, '00, '05, '09, '11) and were state runners-up six times. His teams won two national championships in 1998 and 2000. Shows finished with a record of 345–78–0 and a .817 winning percentage at West Monroe, Pineville High School, Jonesboro-Hodge High School and Farmerville High School.

== Notable alumni ==
- Tommy Banks (Class of 1997), medical doctor and former fullback for the LSU Tigers
- Will Blackwell (Class of 2007), former professional football player
- Chad Cook (Class of 2003), gridiron football player
- Dillon Day (Class of 2011), Green Bay Packers
- Chuck Finley, Former MLB player (California Angels, Cleveland Indians, St. Louis Cardinals)
- Bruce Fowler (Class of 1980), opera singer
- Roderick Green (Class of 1997), Oklahoma Christian University basketball player, Paralympian 1999–present Volleyball and Track and Field, Amp1 basketball 2012–present, and six-time Paralympic and World Championship medalist
- James Donald Halsell, Jr. (Class of 1974), NASA Astronaut
- Haley Hayden (Class of 2013), softball player
- Dixon Hearne (Class of 1966), award-winning author
- Michael Hunter (Class of 2010), Denver Broncos
- Dwayne Lathan (Class of 2007), former professional basketball player
- Bradie James (Class of 1999), Dallas Cowboys & Houston Texans
- Paul Manning (Class of 2022), Denver Broncos
- Barkevious Mingo (Class of 2009), New England Patriots (Super Bowl Champion)
- Rayshawn Pleasant (Class of 2022), college football cornerback for the Tulane Green Wave
- Cam Robinson (Class of 2014), Jacksonville Jaguars
- Mike Smith (Class of 1997), former professional basketball player
- Jerry Stovall (Class of 1958), All-American running back LSU, NFL Pro Bowls, head football coach for LSU
- Paul Turner (Class of 2012), New England Patriots
- Andrew Whitworth (Class of 2001), Cincinnati Bengals (2006–2016), Los Angeles Rams (2017–2021), Super Bowl Champion
- Ralph Williams (Class of 1976), gridiron football player
- Xavier Woods (Class of 2013), Dallas Cowboys
- Andre Young, Louisiana Tech, San Diego Chargers

== Notable faculty ==
- Steve Ensminger, offensive coordinator/quarterbacks coach at LSU, wide receiver coach in 2002
- Justin Hill, head baseball coach at McNeese State, assistant baseball coach in 2003

== See also ==
- List of high schools in Louisiana
