= List of highways numbered 841 =

The following highways are numbered 841:

== United States ==
- County Road 841 (Collier County, Florida)
- KY 841
- LA 841
- PA 841
- PR-841
- FM 841

== Canada ==
- Highway 841, Alberta Highway 841

Preceded by 840	Lists of highways 841	Succeeded by 842
