= Dixon Hearne =

American educator and writer

- Born: 1948 (age 77–78); Monroe, Louisiana, U.S.
- Education: West Monroe High School; University of Louisiana at Monroe; University of St. Thomas (BA); Pepperdine University (MA); Claremont Graduate University (PhD)
- Occupations: Writer, educator

Dixon Hearne (born 1948) is an American educator and writer of fiction, nonfiction, and poetry. He has published an education text (Teaching Second-Language Learning with Learning Disabilities), four short story collections: Delta Flats: Stories in the Key of Blues and Hope; Plantatia: High-toned and Lowdown Stories of the South; Native Voices, Native Lands; and When Christmas was Real, and edited several anthologies. His novella, From Tickfaw to Shongaloo is forthcoming from Southeast Missouri State University Press. It was previously named the sole runner-up in the international creative writing competition sponsored by the Pirates Alley Faulkner Society in New Orleans. The contest was judged by Moira Crone.

After writing for professional magazines and journals, he began to write in a "different voice". In 2003, his first short story won an award and was subsequently published in a literary journal. His short fiction, poetry, and nonfiction have received numerous awards and appear widely in magazines, journals, and anthologies.

== Early life, education and early career ==
Hearne was born in Monroe, Louisiana and raised along levees of the Ouachita River in West Monroe, Louisiana. As a child, he often traveled with his father on his sales routes through the back roads of northeast Louisiana. Many of the characters and voices in his works of fiction are drawn from the store front porches and inhabitants of the small southern towns that populated this region. He graduated from West Monroe High School and began college at University of Louisiana-Monroe. When his father became ill, he had to withdraw from school and find a job. He moved to Houston, Texas where he worked his way through University of St. Thomas to earn a BA in English and History. He taught in Houston's inner-city before moving to Los Angeles to pursue an MA at Pepperdine University, and later earned a PhD at Claremont Graduate University.

== Career ==
Hearne split his career between teaching English and special education in public schools and university positions: Clarke College, Loras College, University of Dubuque; California State University-San Bernardino; Cal-Poly-Pomona; Whittier College; University of Texas-Brownsville; and Chapman University. He is semi-retired and teaches occasional courses in general and special education. He served on several editorial boards of leading journals.

== Honors ==
- Second Place 2014 William Faulkner-William Wisdom Writing Competition
- Plantatia listed by NewPages.com under New & Noteworthy Books
- National Indie Excellence Book Awards – Plantatia: High-toned and Lowdown Stories of the South
- Pushcart Prize nominations in 2008 and 2010 for fiction
- 2010 Hemingway/PEN award nomination, Plantatia: High-toned and Lowdown Stories of the South
- 2010 Creative Spirit Award, Platinum
- Named "New and Noteworthy" by NewPages.com, Plantatia: High-toned and Lowdown Stories of the South
- Several Editors' Choice awards for short fiction, essay, and poetry
- 2014 Spur Award Finalist, selected by Western Writers of America, for the poem Skulls
- Magna cum laude graduate – University of St. Thomas
- Phi Alpha Theta, National History Honor Society
- Delta Epsilon Sigma, National Catholic Scholastic Honor Society

== Published works ==
Books

- Delta Flats: Stories in the Key of Blues and Hope, Amphorae Publishing Group. 2016. ISBN 978-1-940442143
- From Tickfaw to Shongaloo, Southeast Missouri State University Press. 2015. ISBN 978-0990353065
- Christmas Traditions, Adams Media, 2008
- Native Voices, Native Lands. Laughing Cactus Press. 2013.ISBN 978-1937905200
- Plantatia: High-toned and Lowdown Stories of the South. Southeast Missouri State University Press. 2009. ISBN 978-0982248911
- Teacakes and Afternoon Tales, AWOC.COM Publishing, 2008.
- Teaching Second-Language Learners with Learning Disabilities. Academic Communication Associates. 2000. ISBN 978-1575030579
- Thanksgiving to Christmas: A Patchwork of Stories. AWOC. 2009. ISBN 978-0937660584
- When Christmas was Real. AWOC. 2012. ISBN 978-1620160183
- Woodstock Revisited, Adams Media, 2009

Short stories

- "Bouree"
- "Mercy Rare"
- "Petty Wise"
- "Crescent City Blues"
- "Don't Try Me"
- "Two for One"
- "Lifelines"
- "Boogers, Haints, and Heathens"
- "And That's the Truth"
- "Never Was"
- "Redemption"
- "Tidewater"
- "Threads"
- "Raptured"
- "A Good Woman Knows"
- "Three Stories"
- "Canyons of Wisdom"
- "Going up North", Big Muddy, 2013
- "Reaching West", Potomac Review, 2012
- "Word from New Iberia", Wisconsin Review, 2008
- "Sandbars", Roanoke Review, 2008
- "The Tinder Woods", Louisiana Literature, 2008
- "The Right Eye of Justice", Valley Voices, 2008
- "The Christmas Cake", Mature Living, 2007
- "Along the Levee's Edge", Louisiana Review, 2007
- "Plantatia", Big Muddy, 2006
- "Tethered Hearts", Cream City Review, 2005
- "White Trash Wedding", Big Muddy, 2005

Essays/Other

- "We Need a Little Bit of Walter Cronkite" The Shreveport Times
- "Imagination: The Writer-Creator Within", Fine Lines, 2010
- "The Axis of Boomer Wisdom", Woodstock Revisited, 2009
- "Teach Our Children Well"
- "Interview with David Armand (author) – New Orleans Review
- "Interview with David Armand (author) - Oxford American

Poetry

- Down the Dark River Louisiana Literature Press. 2015.
- The Southern Poetry Anthology: Louisiana, Vol. 4. Texas Review Press. 2012.
- "Delta Deep," "Nesting"
- "Collateral Lessons"
- The Southern Poetry Anthology: Louisiana, Vol. 4, 2012
- "Skulls," "Wagons West", Weber: The Contemporary West, 2013
- "Choctaw Trail of Tears", New Plains Review, 2012
- "We Thrive", Big Muddy, 2012
- "Drawing Inward" Tulane Review, Fall 2014

Co-editor

- A Quilt of Holidays
- Teacakes and Afternoon Tales
- Sweet Tea and Afternoon Tales

== Interviews ==
- Louisiana Anthology Project interview
- Twelve Minute Muse interview
- Mississippi Authors interview
- Belle Reve Literary Journal interview
- Fleur de Lit interview
