= Larry Lolley =

American judge (1945–2018)

John Larry Lolley (October 30, 1945 – February 18, 2018) was an American judge.

Lolley went to Ouachita Parish High School in Monroe, Louisiana. He received his bachelor's degree in government and economics from University of Louisiana at Monroe and his law degree from Loyola University New Orleans College of Law. He practiced law in Monroe, Louisiana and served as the Monroe city attorney. Lolley served in the United States Army and was commissioned a colonel. He served as judge for the Monroe City Court and for the Louisiana District Court. He served on the Louisiana Circuit Courts of Appeals from 2003 until his retirement in 2017.
