= Joyce, Louisiana =

- Census-designated place (CDP) and Unincorporated community
- Location within Louisiana Location within the United States
- Coordinates: 31°56′05″N 92°35′06″W
- Country: United States
- State: Louisiana
- Parish: Winn

Area
  - Total: 2.93 sq mi (7.58 km^{2})
  - Land: 2.93 sq mi (7.58 km^{2})
  - Water: 0 sq mi (0.00 km^{2})
- Elevation: 131 ft (40 m)

Population (2020)
  - Total: 328
  - Density: 112.1/sq mi (43.29/km^{2})
- Time zone: UTC-6 (Central (CST))
  - Summer (DST): UTC-5 (CDT)
- ZIP code: 71440
- Area code: 318
- GNIS feature ID: 2586687

Joyce is an unincorporated community and census-designated place in Winn Parish, Louisiana, United States. As of the 2020 census, Joyce had a population of 328. Its ZIP code is 71440.

== Demographics ==
Historical population
Census	Pop.	Note	%±
2010	384		—
2020	328		−14.6%
U.S. Decennial Census

Joyce first appeared as a census designated place in the 2010 U.S. census.
