= Interstate 840 =

Interstate 840 can refer to either of two highways in the United States:

- Interstate 840 (North Carolina), the northern half of the Greensboro Urban Loop around Greensboro, North Carolina
- Interstate 840 (Tennessee), the outer bypass of Nashville, Tennessee
