= Fairbanks, Louisiana =

- Unincorporated community
- Location within Louisiana Location within the United States
- Coordinates: 32°38′40″N 92°02′11″W
- Country: United States
- State: Louisiana
- Parish: Ouachita
- Elevation: 85 ft (26 m)
- Time zone: UTC-6 (Central (CST))
  - Summer (DST): UTC-5 (CDT)
- ZIP code: 71240
- Area code: 318
- GNIS feature ID: 534876

Fairbanks is an unincorporated community in Ouachita Parish, Louisiana, United States. The community is located along Louisiana Highway 134 near U.S. Route 165, 10.5 miles (16.9 km) north-northeast of downtown Monroe. Fairbanks has a post office with ZIP code 71240.
