= Ouachita Parish, Louisiana =

Parish in Louisiana, United States

Coordinates: 32.48°N 92.16°W

- Parish
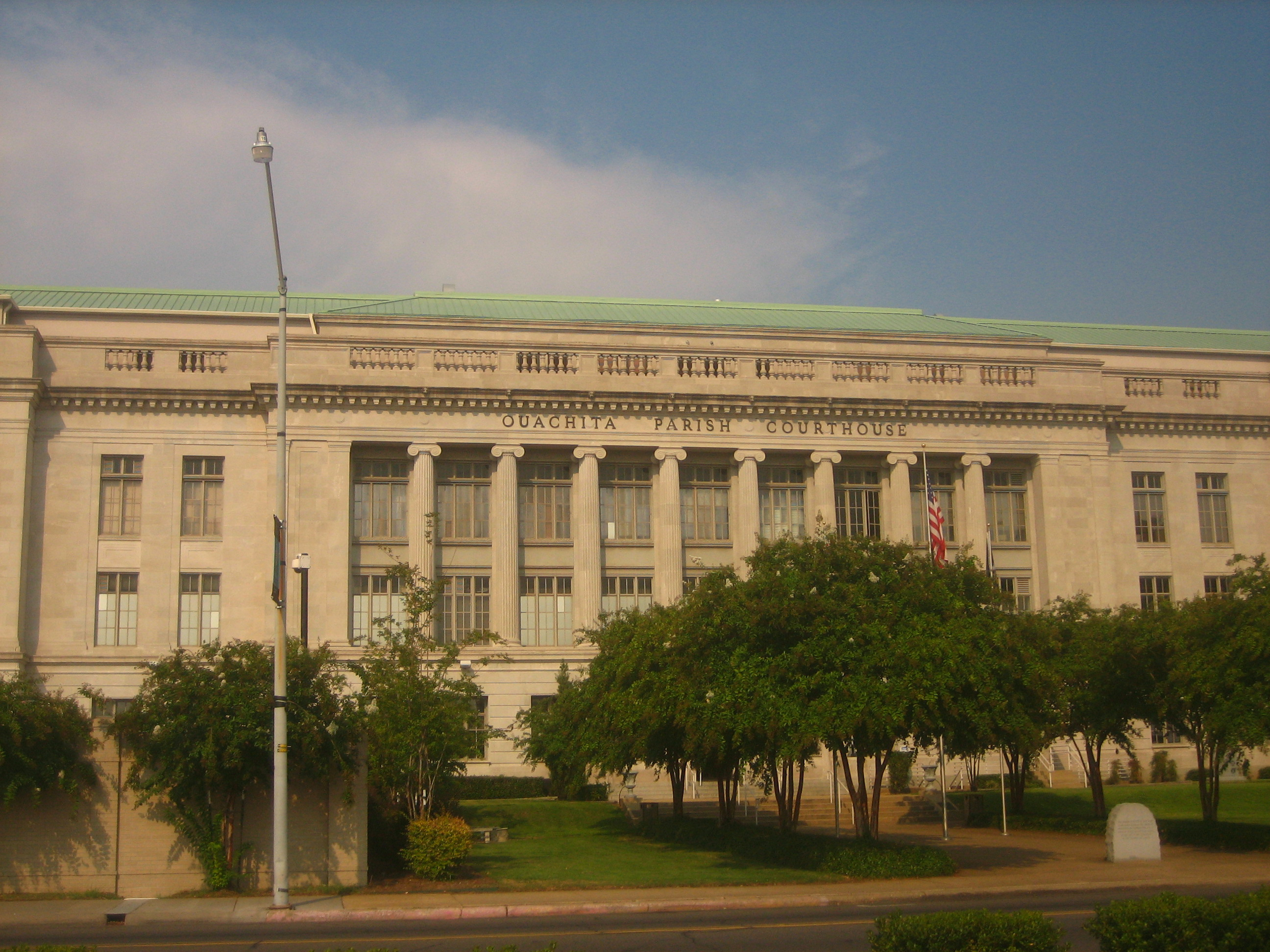
- Ouachita Parish Courthouse in Monroe was built in the 1930s by the contractor George A. Caldwell

- Flag Seal

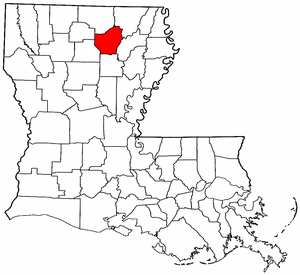
- Location within the U.S. state of Louisiana

- Louisiana's location within the U.S.
- Country: United States
- State: Louisiana
- Region: North Louisiana
- Founded: March 31, 1807 (219 years ago)
- Named for: Ouachita people
- Parish seat (and largest city): Monroe

Area
  - Total: 632 sq mi (1,640 km^{2})
  - Land: 610 sq mi (1,600 km^{2})
  - Water: 21 sq mi (54 km^{2})
  - percentage: 3.4 sq mi (8.8 km^{2})

Population (2020)
  - Total: 160,368
  - Estimate (2025): 158,542 ▼
  - Rank: LA: 8th
  - Density: 260/sq mi (100/km^{2})
- Time zone: UTC-6 (CST)
  - Summer (DST): UTC-5 (CDT)
- Area code: 318
- Congressional district: 5th
- Website: Ouachita Parish Police Jury

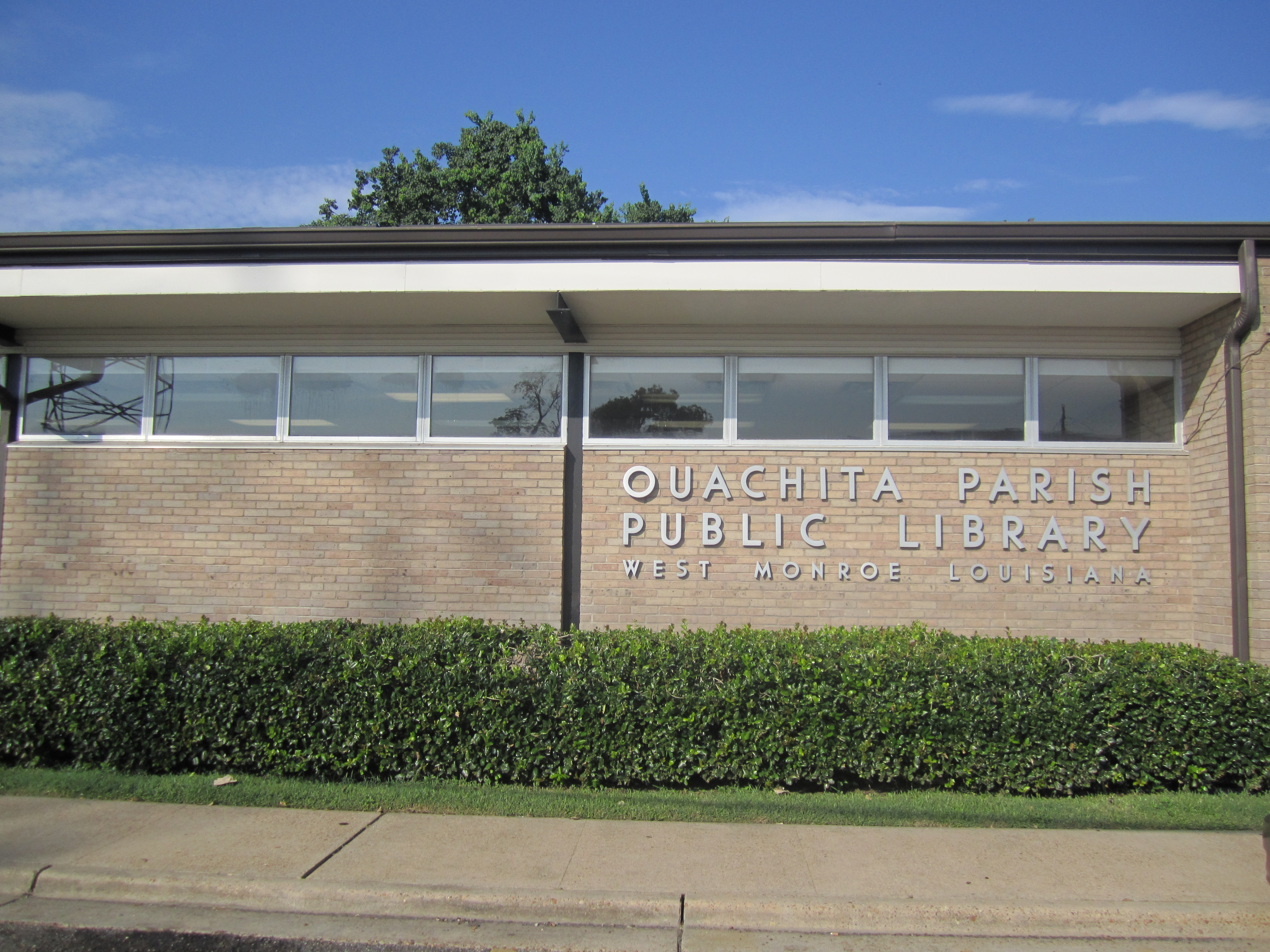
Ouachita Parish Public Library in downtown West Monroe

Ouachita Parish is a parish located in the northern part of the U.S. state of Louisiana. As of the 2020 census, the population was 160,368. The parish seat and largest city is Monroe. The parish was formed in 1807.

Ouachita Parish is part of the Monroe, Louisiana Metropolitan Statistical Area. Located here is Watson Brake, the oldest indigenous earthwork mound complex in North America. It was built around 3500 BC, making it older than the Ancient Egyptian pyramids or Britain's Stonehenge. It is on privately owned land and not available for public viewing.

== History ==
=== Prehistory ===
Ouachita Parish was the home to many succeeding Native American groups in the thousands of years before Europeans colonized the area. Peoples of the Marksville culture, Troyville culture, Coles Creek culture and Plaquemine culture built villages and earthwork mound sites throughout the area. Notable examples include the Filhiol Mound Site, located on a natural levee of the Ouachita River.

The oldest and most significant is Watson Brake, the most ancient mound complex in North America, dated to 5400 BP (before present), or about 3500 BC. Its dating changed archeologists' understanding of the antiquity of mounds in North America and what types of cultures constructed them. This site is located on private land and not available for viewing.

=== Historic era ===
The parish was named after the Ouachita River, which flows through southern Arkansas and northeastern Louisiana, and the Ouachita tribe who lived along it. Beginning about 1720, French settlers arrived in what became organized as modern Ouachita Parish. Colonists developed a plantation on Bayou DeSiard that used African slave labor. The Natchez Indians destroyed the Ouachita plantations during the Natchez Revolt of 1729–1731, and the French did not return.

Beginning in the 1750s, Choctaw Indians began hunting in northern Louisiana, including the Ouachita country, expanding from their traditional territory in what is now Mississippi. At the time, only a few French families moved north into this area from the Opelousas Post on the Red River.

Following its defeat in the Seven Years' War, in 1763 France ceded its territories in North America east of the Mississippi River to the victor Great Britain. Spain took over French territories west of the Mississippi, including nominally in Louisiana. In 1769, Alejandro O'Reilly, the first Spanish governor to rule successfully in West Louisiana, claimed Ouachita Parish for Spain. A census of the parish that year recorded 110 white people. In 1769 Spain abolished the Indian slave trade and Indian slavery in its colonies.

Even in the 19th century, after the United States acquired this territory in the Louisiana Purchase of 1803, some mixed-race American slaves were able to win freedom suits by proving Indian ancestry in their maternal line; under most southern state slave laws, children were born into the status of the mother. Thus a mixed-race child of an Indian mother or grandmother was legally free in former Spanish territory west of the Mississippi River, such as Louisiana, Arkansas or Missouri, as the Indians had been free people since 1769.

In 1783, Don Juan Filhiol was among Frenchmen who began to work for the Spanish colonial government in Louisiana. (He was born Jean-Baptiste Filhiol (1740) in Eymet, France (near Bordeaux), to French Calvinists François Filhiol and Anne Marie Teyssonnière, cloth merchants.) He was assigned that year to establish the first European outpost in the area of the Ouachita River Valley, called Poste d'Ouachita. With his wife, a few soldiers and slaves, his small party made the slow, arduous journey by keelboat up the Mississippi, Red, Black and Ouachita rivers to reach this area. In 1785 the European population of the entire Ouachita District (which extended into present-day Arkansas) was only 207.

Originally based in Arkansas, Filhiol surveyed his grant and settled in 1785 at Prairie des Canots (included within the present-day city of Monroe). He gradually organized settlers, including trying to train some in military skills. He built Fort Miro on his land to provide protection for settlers from the Indians. At the same time, he worked to establish trade with the Chickasaw people and other Native Americans of the area. He was tasked with organizing the settlers in the Ouachita River Valley, while keeping out Americans and establishing good relations for trade with the Native Americans. Filhio served as commandant of Poste d'Ouachita until 1800, when he retired. He continued to live on his plantation here.

=== Acquired by United States ===
Other settlers and merchants were attracted to the trading post, which became known as Fort Miro, with a town developing by 1805, two years after the United States acquired the Louisiana Purchase from France. This was the vast former French territory (France had reacquired it from Spain for a brief period) west of the Mississippi and outside the Southwest and California, which were still Spanish territory. In 1819 the Americans renamed Fort Miro as the Ouachita Post. A year or so later, they changed the town's name to Monroe, after the first steamboat to reach it in travel up the Ouachita River. The arrival of the powered paddle wheeler was a landmark event, as it connected the town to much easier travel to and from other markets and stimulated its growth.

On March 31, 1807, the Territory of Orleans was divided into 19 sub-districts. The very large Ouachita Parish was one of these original 19; later it was broken up into eight other parishes (Morehouse, Caldwell, Union, Franklin, Tensas, Madison, East Carroll, and West Carroll), as more settlers entered the area and developed towns and plantations. Some brought slaves with them, but many bought slaves at markets. In the early 19th century, a total of one million slaves were forcibly moved through the domestic slave trade from the Upper South to the Deep South of the cotton plantation districts. They traveled overland or were shipped in the coastwise trade to Gulf ports.

=== Post-Reconstruction to present ===
Following the Reconstruction era, as white Democrats regained control of the state government, they increasingly worked to re-establish dominance over the freedmen in Ouachita Parish. Elections were often won by intimidation and fraud, and they worked to establish white supremacy. Particularly in the late 19th and early 20th centuries, lynchings mostly of black men by white mobs in Ouachita and across the South were a form of racial terror by which the whites enforced their dominance. A 2015 study of lynchings found that from 1877 to 1950, a total of 38 people were lynched in Ouachita Parish. This was the third-highest total in the state, and the fifth-highest total of lynchings of any county in the South. Among the victims was George Bolden, an illiterate black man "accused of writing a lewd note to a white woman". Before he went to trial, he was lynched near Monroe on April 30, 1919.

In 1883, the first railroad bridge across the Ouachita River was built, improving connections for the town with other markets.

In 1916, the Monroe natural gas field was discovered. The field stretched more than 500 square miles (1,000 km^{2}) and was estimated to have 6,500,000,000,000 cubic feet (180 km^{3}) of natural gas in it. As a result, for a time the city of Monroe was known as the natural gas capital of the world. The new industry generated many jobs. From 1920 to 1930, the population of Ouachita Parish increased by more than 79 percent, to 54,000 people, as migrants arrived for work. (see Demographics section and table.)

The town of Sterlington was incorporated in August 1961, and in 1974 the town of Richwood was incorporated. Ouachita Parish's boundaries have changed 23 times during its history, mostly due to the formation of other parishes in the 19th century.

== Geography ==
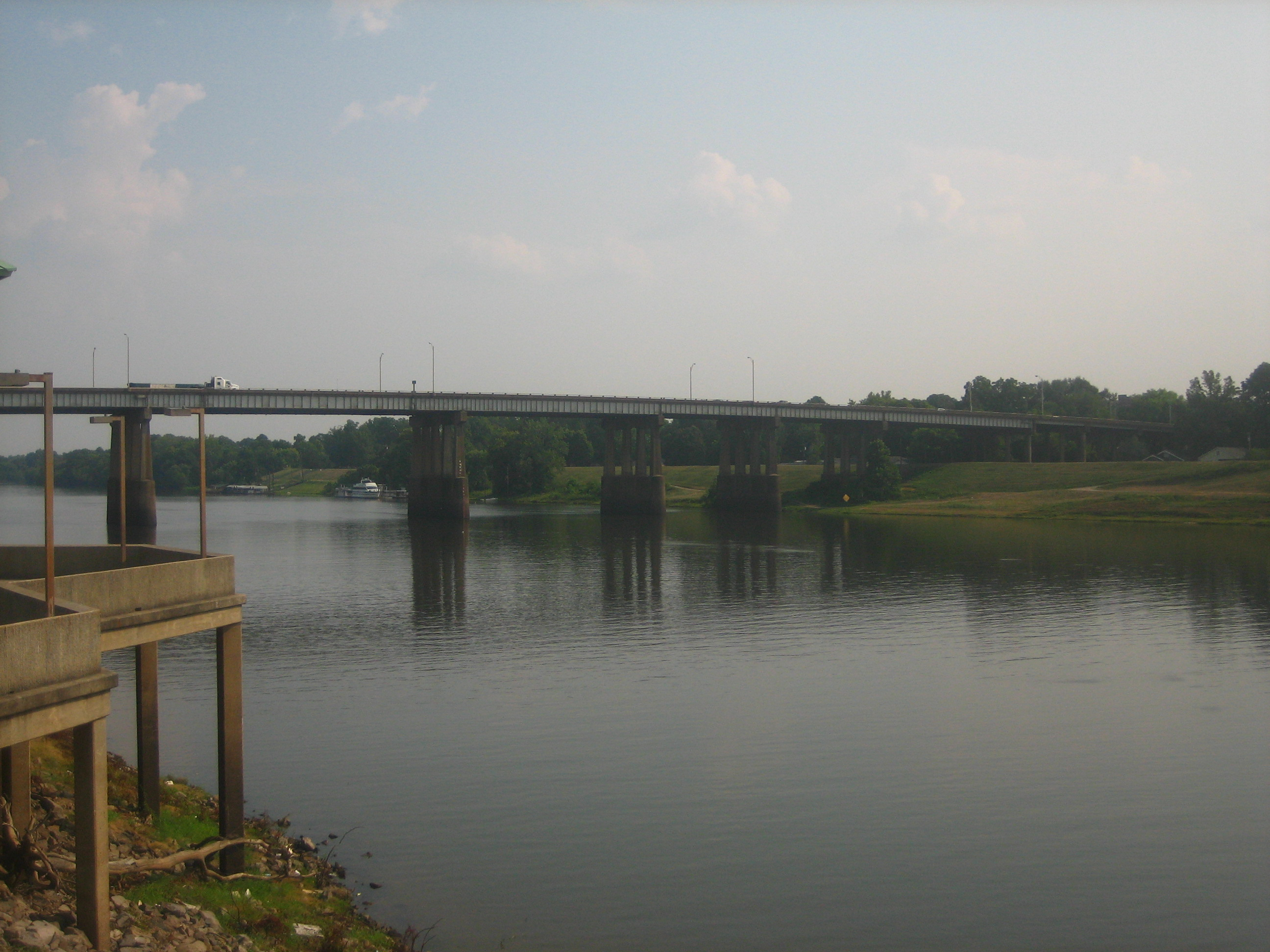
The Ouachita River separates Monroe from West Monroe near the parish courthouse.

According to the U.S. Census Bureau, the parish has a total area of 632 square miles (1,640 km^{2}), of which 610 square miles (1,600 km^{2}) is land and 21 square miles (54 km^{2}) (3.4%) is water.

=== Major highways ===
- Interstate 20
- U.S. Highway 80
- U.S. Highway 165
  - US 165 Bus.
- Louisiana Highway 2
- Louisiana Highway 15
- Louisiana Highway 34
- Louisiana Highway 134
- Louisiana Highway 136
- Louisiana Highway 139
- Louisiana Highway 143
- Louisiana Highway 144
- Louisiana Highway 151
- Louisiana Highway 546
- Louisiana Highway 553
- Louisiana Highway 554
- Louisiana Highway 557
- Louisiana Highway 594
- Louisiana Highway 616
- Louisiana Highway 617
- Louisiana Highway 837
- Louisiana Highway 838
- Louisiana Highway 840-1
- Louisiana Highway 840-6
- Louisiana Highway 841
- Louisiana Highway 3033
- Louisiana Highway 3280

=== Adjacent parishes ===
- Union Parish (north)
- Morehouse Parish (northeast)
- Richland Parish (east)
- Caldwell Parish (south)
- Jackson Parish (southwest)
- Lincoln Parish (west)

=== National protected areas ===
- Black Bayou Lake National Wildlife Refuge
- D'Arbonne National Wildlife Refuge (part)

== Communities ==
=== Cities ===
- Monroe (parish seat and largest municipality)
- West Monroe

=== Towns ===
- Richwood
- Sterlington

=== Unincorporated areas ===
==== Census-designated places ====
- Bawcomville
- Brownsville
- Calhoun
- Claiborne
- Lakeshore
- Swartz
- da 5

==== Other unincorporated communities ====
- Bosco
- Fairbanks
- Pine Grove
- Wham

== Demographics ==
Historical population
Census	Pop.	Note	%±
1820	2,896		—
1830	5,140		77.5%
1840	4,640		−9.7%
1850	5,008		7.9%
1860	4,727		−5.6%
1870	11,582		145.0%
1880	14,685		26.8%
1890	17,985		22.5%
1900	20,947		16.5%
1910	25,830		23.3%
1920	30,319		17.4%
1930	54,337		79.2%
1940	59,168		8.9%
1950	74,713		26.3%
1960	101,663		36.1%
1970	115,387		13.5%
1980	139,241		20.7%
1990	142,191		2.1%
2000	147,250		3.6%
2010	153,720		4.4%
2020	160,368		4.3%
2025 (est.)	158,542	▼	−1.1%
U.S. Decennial Census; 1790-1960 1900-1990; 1990-2000 2010-2019

=== Racial and ethnic composition ===
Ouachita Parish, Louisiana – Racial and ethnic composition Note: the US Census treats Hispanic/Latino as an ethnic category. This table excludes Latinos from the racial categories and assigns them to a separate category. Hispanics/Latinos may be of any race.
Race / Ethnicity (NH = Non-Hispanic)	Pop 1980	Pop 1990	Pop 2000	Pop 2010	Pop 2020	% 1980	% 1990	% 2000	% 2010	% 2020
White alone (NH)	97,060	96,045	94,013	91,573	87,426	69.71%	67.55%	63.85%	59.57%	54.52%
Black or African American alone (NH)	40,305	43,996	49,270	55,946	58,804	28.95%	30.94%	33.46%	36.39%	36.67%
Native American or Alaska Native alone (NH)	108	217	319	347	413	0.08%	0.15%	0.22%	0.23%	0.26%
Asian alone (NH)	385	726	932	1,429	2,276	0.28%	0.51%	0.63%	0.93%	1.42%
Native Hawaiian or Pacific Islander alone (NH)	x	x	32	41	30	x	x	0.02%	0.03%	0.02%
Other race alone (NH)	107	13	59	94	408	0.08%	0.01%	0.04%	0.06%	0.25%
Mixed race or Multiracial (NH)	x	x	878	1,530	5,353	x	x	0.60%	1.00%	3.34%
Hispanic or Latino (any race)	1,276	1,194	1,747	2,760	5,658	0.92%	0.84%	1.19%	1.80%	3.53%
Total	139,241	142,191	147,250	153,720	160,368	100.00%	100.00%	100.00%	100.00%	100.00%

=== 2020 census ===
As of the 2020 census, Ouachita Parish had a population of 160,368, 62,654 households, and 34,816 families residing in the parish.

The median age was 36.4 years, with 25.0% of residents under the age of 18 and 15.5% of residents age 65 or older. For every 100 females there were 89.8 males, and for every 100 females age 18 and over there were 85.5 males age 18 and over.

The racial makeup of the parish was 55.2% White, 36.8% Black or African American, 0.3% American Indian and Alaska Native, 1.4% Asian, <0.1% Native Hawaiian and Pacific Islander, 1.9% from some other race, and 4.2% from two or more races. Hispanic or Latino residents of any race comprised 3.5% of the population.

74.8% of residents lived in urban areas, while 25.2% lived in rural areas.

Of those households, 32.9% had children under the age of 18 living in them, 38.5% were married-couple households, 19.2% were households with a male householder and no spouse or partner present, and 36.0% were households with a female householder and no spouse or partner present. About 29.7% of households were made up of individuals and 11.6% had someone living alone who was 65 years of age or older.

There were 70,028 housing units, of which 10.5% were vacant. Among occupied housing units, 58.1% were owner-occupied and 41.9% were renter-occupied. The homeowner vacancy rate was 2.0% and the rental vacancy rate was 9.3%.

== Economy ==
The top employers in the parish, according to the North Louisiana Economic Partnership, are:

No.	Employer	Employees
1	Lumen Technologies	2,360
2	St. Francis Specialty Hospital	1,584
3	State of Louisiana	1,363
4	J.P. Morgan Chase	1,291
5	Glenwood Regional Medical Center	1,156
6	Wal-Mart Stores	912
7	Ouachita Parish	871
8	City of Monroe	840
9	Graphic Packaging International	840
10	Tolliver Oil & Gas	750

== Law enforcement ==
Ouachita Parish Sheriff's Office
- Abbreviation: OPSO

Jurisdictional structure
- General nature: Local civilian police

Operational structure
- Headquarters: Monroe, Louisiana
- Agency executive: Marc Mashaw, Sheriff

Website
- http://www.opso.net/

The Ouachita Parish Sheriff's Office (OPSO) is the primary law enforcement agency of Ouachita Parish. It falls under the authority of the Sheriff, who is the chief law enforcement officer of the parish. Since the formation of the Sheriff's Office, six deputies and one Sheriff have been killed in the line of duty, the most common cause being gunfire. The Ouachita Correctional Center (OCC) was opened in 1963, presently houses a maximum of 1,222 offenders, and employs roughly 150 full time deputies.

== Politics ==
United States presidential election results for Ouachita Parish, Louisiana
Year	Republican		Democratic		Third party(ies)	
Year	No.	%	No.	%	No.	%
1912	17	1.58%	902	83.91%	156	14.51%
1916	35	2.79%	1,215	96.97%	3	0.24%
1920	164	9.96%	1,481	89.98%	1	0.06%
1924	480	22.77%	1,542	73.15%	86	4.08%
1928	1,380	33.50%	2,739	66.50%	0	0.00%
1932	423	6.58%	5,968	92.86%	36	0.56%
1936	1,113	12.72%	7,635	87.28%	0	0.00%
1940	1,509	15.07%	8,506	84.93%	0	0.00%
1944	2,627	29.33%	6,329	70.67%	0	0.00%
1948	1,729	16.01%	4,213	39.00%	4,860	44.99%
1952	8,842	47.49%	9,775	52.51%	0	0.00%
1956	7,094	46.80%	4,372	28.84%	3,692	24.36%
1960	10,525	54.56%	5,202	26.97%	3,564	18.47%
1964	21,024	83.44%	4,174	16.56%	0	0.00%
1968	10,089	31.82%	6,470	20.41%	15,145	47.77%
1972	24,860	74.74%	6,920	20.80%	1,483	4.46%
1976	24,082	59.53%	15,738	38.91%	631	1.56%
1980	29,799	62.98%	16,306	34.46%	1,209	2.56%
1984	37,270	69.57%	15,525	28.98%	779	1.45%
1988	33,858	67.32%	15,429	30.68%	1,005	2.00%
1992	27,600	48.85%	20,835	36.87%	8,067	14.28%
1996	28,559	49.59%	24,525	42.58%	4,510	7.83%
2000	35,107	60.31%	21,457	36.86%	1,647	2.83%
2004	41,750	64.78%	22,016	34.16%	678	1.05%
2008	41,741	62.07%	24,813	36.90%	690	1.03%
2012	40,948	59.80%	26,645	38.91%	881	1.29%
2016	41,734	61.36%	24,428	35.91%	1,855	2.73%
2020	42,255	61.09%	25,913	37.46%	998	1.44%
2024	40,808	63.33%	22,845	35.45%	783	1.22%

== Education ==
Ouachita Parish School Board serves areas outside of the City of Monroe with primary and secondary schools. Monroe City School System serves areas within Monroe.

Private high schools in the parish include:

- River Oaks School has a Monroe postal address though it is outside of the city limits
- St. Frederick Catholic High School is in Monroe

Monroe is also the home of the University of Louisiana at Monroe.

== Media ==
A documentary entitled The Gift of the Ouachita by filmmaker George C. Brian (1919–2007), head of the Division of Theater and Drama at the University of Louisiana at Monroe is a history of Monroe as the "gift of the Ouachita River".

== National Guard ==
1022nd Engineer Company (Vertical) of the 527th Engineer Battalion of the 225th Engineer Brigade is located in West Monroe, Louisiana. 528th Engineer Battalion (To the Very End) also part of the 225th Engineer Brigade is headquartered in Monroe.

== Notable people ==
- Joseph A. Biedenharn
- Samuel B. Fuller
- James D. Halsell
- Dixon Hearne
- Alton Hardy Howard
- Newt V. Mills
- Willie Robertson
- Phil Robertson
- Si Robertson
- Jase Robertson
- Edwin Francis Jemison

== See also ==
- National Register of Historic Places listings in Ouachita Parish, Louisiana
