= David Armand (author) =

American writer (born 1980)

- Born: 1980 (age 45–46); New Orleans, Louisiana, U.S.
- Occupation: Novelist
- Writing career
- Subjects: Fiction, Louisiana

David Armand (born 1980) is an American writer of fiction, non-fiction, poetry and creative essays. He is known for his novels set in Louisiana, multiple collections of poetry, and works of memoir and literary nonfiction. Armand’s writing frequently explores themes of Southern life, memory, and the craft of writing itself.

== Career ==
He earned his Master of Fine Arts from the University of Arkansas. He has published five novels, The Pugilist's Wife, Harlow, The Gorge, The Lord's Acre, and Walk the Night. He has also published four collections of poems, The Deep Woods, Debt, The Evangelist, and Poverty, as well as multiple works of non fiction including the memoir titled My Mother's House and a collection of essays titled Mirrors, and Other Reflections.

His collection of essays, Mirrors, was published by the University of Louisiana at Lafayette Press in 2023 and his memoir on the craft of writing, The Roads We Travel was also published by the University of Louisiana at Lafayette Press.

== Academic Work ==
From 2017-2019, he served as Writer-in-Residence at Southeastern Louisiana University. He is currently Associate Professor of English and Creative Writing at the same institution, holding the Leola R. Purcell Endowed Professorship in English. His academic work includes teaching creative writing, contemporary American literature, and Southern literature.

Armand is also the 2022 recipient of the Louisiana Writer Award, presented annually by the Louisiana Center for the Book in the State Library of Louisiana. He is the twenty-third recipient of the prestigious award presented to recognize outstanding contributions to Louisiana’s literary and intellectual life exemplified by a contemporary Louisiana writer’s body of work. In addition to the Louisiana Writer Award, Armand has received several other honors, including the University of Louisiana System Outstanding Faculty Member of the Year Award in 2020 and various regional literary recognitions.

== Honors ==
- 2010 The Pugilist's Wife named the winner of the George Garrett Fiction Prize
- 2012 The Pugilist's Wife named one of five "Hot Reads" by the New Orleans Times-Picayune
- 2013 The Pugilist's Wife named a New & Noteworthy Book by Newpages
- 2013 Harlow named a top five fiction book of the year by The Richmond Times-Dispatch
- 2014 Harlow longlisted for the SIBA Book Award
- 2014 Selected as a contributor to the Sewanee Writers' Conference
- 2014 Gambit Magazine "40 Under 40" Recipient
- 2015 The Gorge named a finalist in Foreword Reviews Independent Book Awards
- 2015 Southeastern Louisiana University College of Arts, Humanities, and Social Sciences Alumnus of the Year Award
- 2016 Southeastern Louisiana University President's Award for Excellence in Artistic Activity
- 2016 St. Tammany Parish President's Literary Artist of the Year
- 2020 University of Louisiana System Outstanding Faculty Member of the Year
- 2022 Louisiana Writer Award

== Bibliography ==
- Walk the Night (a novel)
- The Roads We Travel: A Memoir on the Craft of Writing and Living (a memoir)
- Poverty (poems)
- Mirrors, and other reflections (essays)
- The Evangelist (poems)
- The Lord's Acre (a novel)
- Debt (poems)
- My Mother's House (a memoir)
- The Deep Woods (poems)
- The Gorge (a novel)
- Harlow (a novel)
- The Pugilist's Wife (a novel)
