= Ouachita Parish School Board =

School district in Louisiana, United States

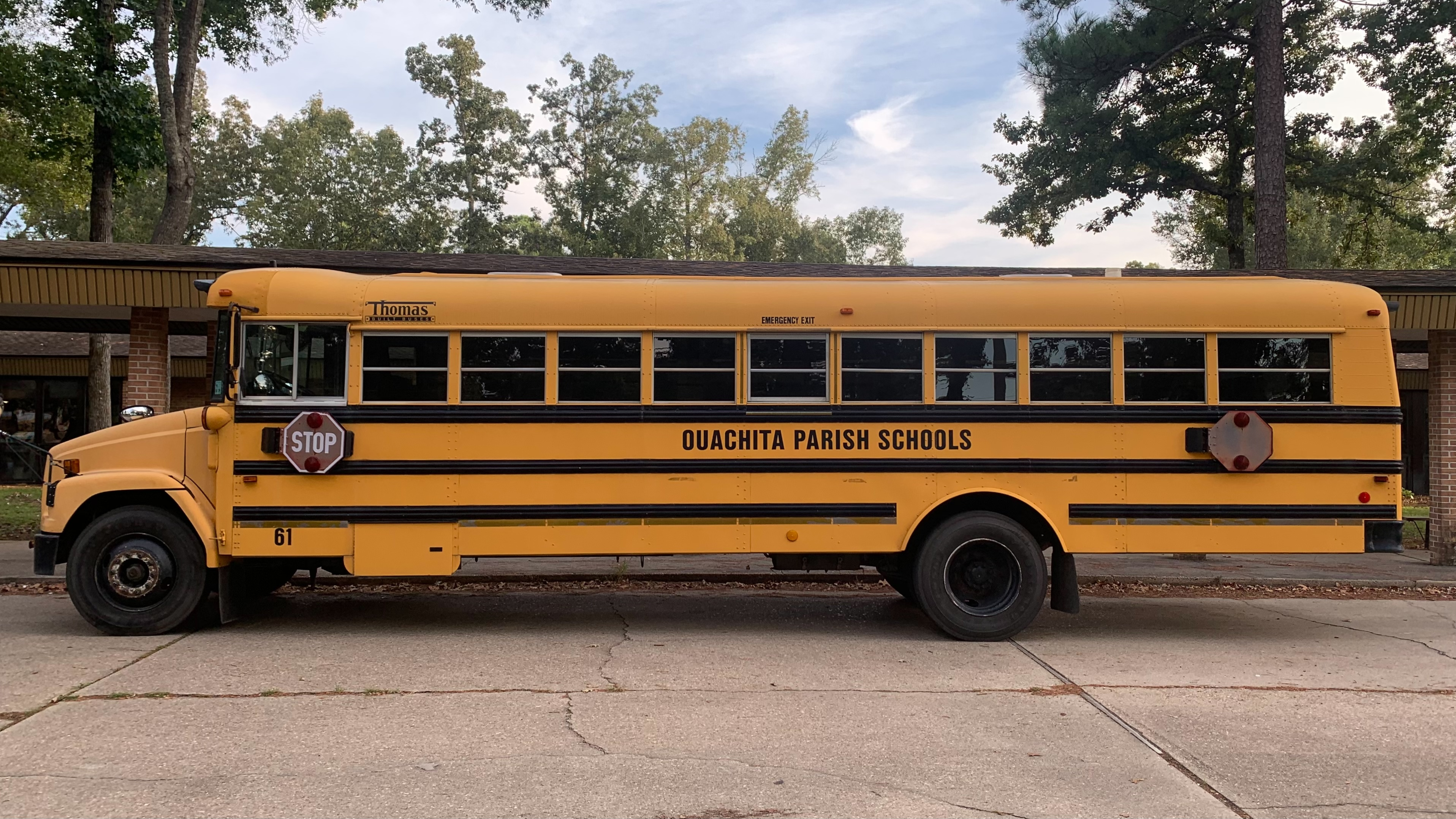
- A Ouachita Parish Schools bus in Swartz, Louisiana

Address
- 1600 N. 7th Street, West Monroe, LA, 71291 United States
- Coordinates: 32°30′39.4776″N 92°8′34.2018″W

District information
- Type: public local school district
- Grades: PreK–12
- Schools: 36
- NCES District ID: 2201200

Students and staff
- Enrollment: 17,435 (2024-2025)
- Faculty: 1,178.40 (on FTE basis)(2024-2025)
- Student–teacher ratio: 14.80 (2024-2025)

Other information
- Website: www.opsb.net

The Ouachita Parish School Board governs the Ouachita Parish School System, a school district headquartered in West Monroe, Louisiana, United States. The district serves Ouachita Parish except for areas within the City of Monroe; those areas are instead served by the Monroe City School System.

== Schools ==
The Ouachita Parish School System operates 36 schools.

=== Elementary schools ===
Elementary Schools in Ouachita Parish School System
School	Address	Grades
Boley Elementary School	2213 Cypress St, West Monroe	PK-5
Calhoun Elementary School	2237 Calhoun Road, Calhoun	PK-2
Central Elementary School	1163 Highway 151 S, Calhoun	3-5
Claiborne School	1011 Wallace Dean Road, West Monroe	PK-5
Crosley Elementary School	700 Natchitoches Street, West Monroe	PK-K
Drew Elementary School	132 Highway 15, West Monroe	PK-5
George W. Welch Elementary School	199 Caldwell Road, West Monroe	K-5
Highland Elementary School	1501 Wellerman Road, West Monroe	PK-5
Jack Hayes Elementary School	3631 Old Sterlington Road	PK-5
Kiroli Elementary School	700 Kiroli Road, West Monroe	PK-5
Lakeshore School	550 Balboa Street, Monroe	PK-5
Lenwil Elementary School	112 Arrant Road, West Monroe	PK-5
Pinecrest Elementary/Middle School	3604 Highway 557, West Monroe	PK-8
Riser Elementary School	100 Price Drive, West Monroe	PK-5
Riverbend Elementary School	700 Austin Avenue, West Monroe	1-5
Robinson Elementary School	5101 Reddix Lane, Monroe	PK-5
Shady Grove Elementary School	2204 Ticheli Road, Monroe	PK-5
Sterlington Elementary School	9040 Highway 165 North, Sterlington	PK-5
Swartz Lower Elementary School	235 Swartz School Rd, Monroe	PK-5
Swartz Upper Elementary School	400 Lincoln Hill Drive, Monroe	3-5
Swayze Elementary School	2400 Burg Jones Lane	PK-5
Woodlawn Elementary School	5946 Jonesboro Road, West Monroe	PK-5

=== Middle Schools ===
Middle Schools in Ouachita Parish School System
School	Address	Grades
Calhoun Middle School	191 Highway 80, Calhoun	6-8
East Ouachita Middle	859 Swartz Fairbanks, Monroe	6-8
Good Hope Middle School	400 Good Hope Road, West Monroe	6-8
Ouachita Junior High School	5500 Blanks Street, Monroe	6-8
Richwood Middle School	5901 Highway 165 S, Monroe	6-8
Riser Middle School	100 Price Drive, West Monroe	6-8
Sterlington Middle School	230 Keystone Rd, Sterlington	6-8
West Ridge Middle School	6977 Cypress Street, West Monroe	6-8
Woodlawn Junior High School	175 Woodlawn School Road, West Monroe	6-8

=== High schools ===
High Schools in Ouachita Parish School System
School	Address	Grades
Ouachita Parish High School	681 Highway 594, Monroe	9-12
Richwood High School	5901 Highway 165 S, Monroe	9-12
Sterlington High School	233 Keystone Road, Monroe	9-12
West Monroe High School	201 Riggs Street, West Monroe	9-12
West Ouachita High School	4061 Caples Road, West Monroe	9-12

== Facilities ==
The school district headquarters were formerly located in Monroe.

In 2015, the building and property of the Chennault Aviation and Military Museum in Monroe reverted back to the school district; the museum is operated by a non-profit.

== Former members ==
Former members of the Ouachita Parish School Board include Monroe native Marc Swayze, a comic book artist and writer, and Charles Anding, a state representative from House District 15 from 1988 to 1996.
