= West Monroe, Louisiana =

- City
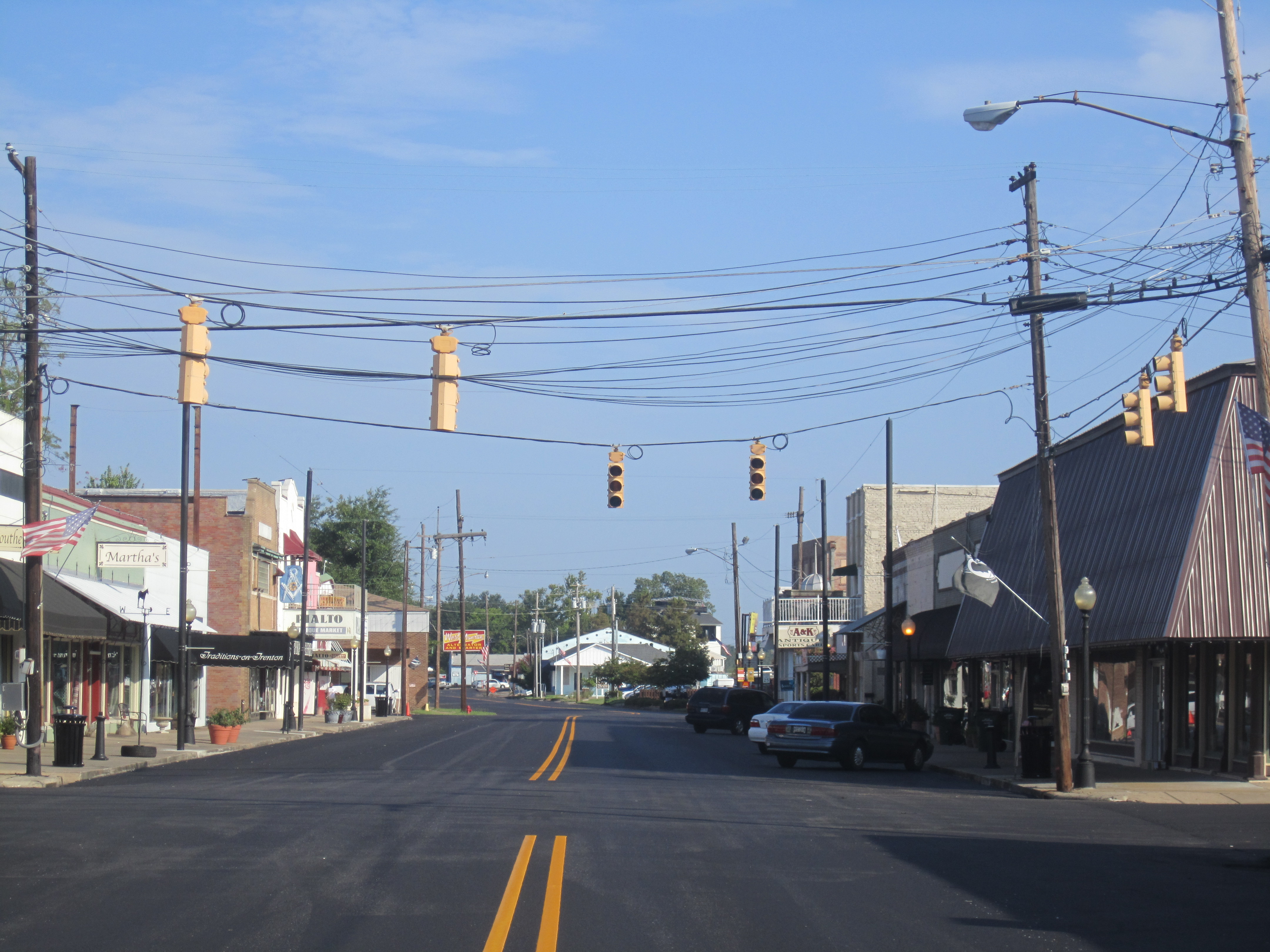
- Cottonport Historic District (2010)

- Location of West Monroe in Ouachita Parish, Louisiana.

- Location of Louisiana in the United States
- Coordinates: 32°30′05″N 92°08′31″W
- Country: United States
- State: Louisiana
- Parish: Ouachita

Government
  - Mayor: Staci Albritton Mitchell

Area
  - Total: 8.31 sq mi (21.53 km^{2})
  - Land: 8.03 sq mi (20.79 km^{2})
  - Water: 0.29 sq mi (0.74 km^{2})
- Elevation: 82 ft (25 m)

Population (2020)
  - Total: 13,103
  - Density: 1,632.6/sq mi (630.35/km^{2})
- Time zone: UTC-6 (CST)
  - Summer (DST): UTC-5 (CDT)
- Postal codes: 71291, 71292
- Area code: 318
- FIPS code: 22-80955
- GNIS feature ID: 2405712

West Monroe is the second largest city in Ouachita Parish, Louisiana, United States. As of the 2020 United States census, its population was 13,103. It is situated on the Ouachita River, across from the neighboring city of Monroe. The two cities are often referred to as the Twin Cities of northeast Louisiana.

== History ==
Originally laid out in 1837 as Byron by John Campbell at the foot of the ferry landing to Monroe, the town floundered and Campbell went bankrupt. The area was bought by Christopher Dabbs, a doctor from Virginia who submitted the plans for Cotton Port in 1854; it officially was recognized in 1859.

It too languished until the arrival of the Vicksburg, Shreveport and Pacific Railway and the construction of the bridge over the Ouachita River. Cotton Port boomed as a river port and rail depot.

== Geography ==
According to the United States Census Bureau, the city has a total area of 8.0 square miles (20.6 km^{2}), of which 7.7 square miles (20.0 km^{2}) is land and 0.2 square mile (0.6 km^{2}) (3.14%) is water.

West Monroe is a separate municipality from Monroe.

== Demographics ==
Historical population
Census	Pop.	Note	%±
1890	447		—
1900	775		73.4%
1910	1,127		45.4%
1920	2,240		98.8%
1930	6,566		193.1%
1940	8,560		30.4%
1950	10,302		20.4%
1960	15,215		47.7%
1970	14,868		−2.3%
1980	14,993		0.8%
1990	14,096		−6.0%
2000	13,250		−6.0%
2010	13,065		−1.4%
2020	13,103		0.3%
2025 (est.)	12,478	▼	−4.8%
U.S. Decennial Census

West Monroe is part of the Monroe Metropolitan Statistical Area.

=== 2020 census ===
As of the 2020 census, West Monroe had a population of 13,103. The median age was 38.0 years. 23.0% of residents were under the age of 18 and 18.1% of residents were 65 years of age or older. For every 100 females there were 86.1 males, and for every 100 females age 18 and over there were 81.1 males age 18 and over.

100.0% of residents lived in urban areas, while 0.0% lived in rural areas.

There were 5,629 households in West Monroe, including 2,636 families, of which 28.7% had children under the age of 18 living in them. Of all households, 28.9% were married-couple households, 23.5% were households with a male householder and no spouse or partner present, and 40.3% were households with a female householder and no spouse or partner present. About 36.9% of all households were made up of individuals and 13.4% had someone living alone who was 65 years of age or older.

There were 6,334 housing units, of which 11.1% were vacant. The homeowner vacancy rate was 2.7% and the rental vacancy rate was 9.4%.

West Monroe racial composition as of 2020
Race	Number	Percentage
White (non-Hispanic)	7,082	54.05%
Black or African American (non-Hispanic)	4,607	35.16%
Native American	27	0.21%
Asian	116	0.89%
Pacific Islander	6	0.05%
Other/Mixed	521	3.98%
Hispanic or Latino	744	5.68%

== Government ==
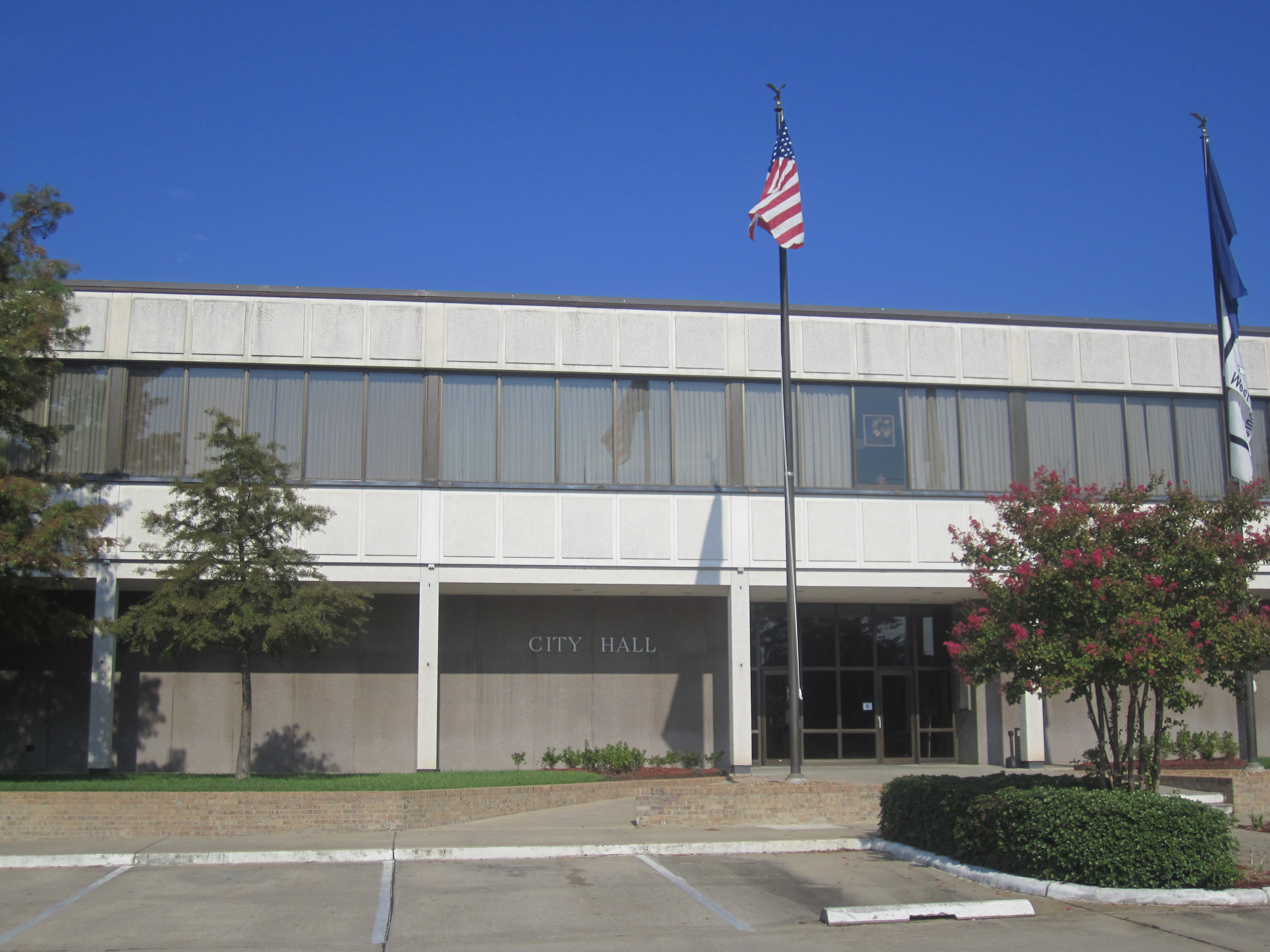
West Monroe City Hall (2010)

The current mayor is Staci Albritton Mitchell, who has served since 2018.

A 2013 "Community Impressions" report complimented the green spaces, including the Kiroli and Restoration parks, and Antique Alley as important assets to the West Monroe community. According to long-term Mayor Dave Norris, the study confirms "the value of many of the projects we've focused on to enhance quality of life." The report identifies situations in need of improvement, many of which have already been addressed, including insufficient or inaccurate signage to area attractions, brown water and the need to renovate certain wells, limited shopping opportunities for clothing, traffic problems on Thomas Road, and the failure to promote the popular phenomenon created from the West Monroe-based A&E reality television series, Duck Dynasty. The consultants declared West Monroe and the general area west of the Ouachita River overall as "a clean, vibrant, growing friendly area ... [with] a small town atmosphere and yet ... many of the amenities and features of a [larger] city."

=== National Guard ===
1022nd Engineer Company (Vertical) of the 527th Engineer Battalion of the 225th Engineer Brigade is located in West Monroe.

== Education ==
Ouachita Parish School System is the area school district.

== Media ==
=== Radio ===
West Monroe is the second most populous city of the Monroe media market for radio.

=== Television ===
West Monroe is part of the Monroe media market for television.

== Notable people ==
- Donnie Copeland, Republican member of the Arkansas House of Representatives, 2015 to 2017
- Clarence Faulk, publisher, broadcaster, businessman in Ruston, born in West Monroe in 1909
- William C. Feazel, oilman, interim U.S. Senator and member of the Louisiana House of Representatives
- Bruce Fowler, opera singer
- Andy Griggs, country singer
- Kevin Gordon, Americana singer/songwriter
- James D. Halsell, astronaut; space shuttle pilot
- Dixon Hearne, author
- Alton Hardy Howard, co-founder of Howard Brothers Discount Stores
- Bradie James, NFL linebacker for the Dallas Cowboys
- Rickey Minor, music director, composer and music producer
- William Norris III (1936-2016), city, district, and circuit court judge
- Webb Pierce, Country Music Hall of Fame member
- Cassidy Riley, professional wrestler for WWE
- Phil Robertson, Duck Dynasty star and founder of Duck Commander
- Kay Robertson, Duck Dynasty star
- Sadie Robertson, Duck Dynasty star
- Si Robertson, Duck Dynasty star
- Willie Robertson, Duck Dynasty star
- Jase Robertson, Duck Dynasty star
- Korie Robertson, Duck Dynasty star
- Bill Russell, professional basketball player
- Andrew Whitworth, NFL offensive tackle
