= List of people from Monroe, Louisiana =

This is a list of people from Monroe, Louisiana and includes notable persons who were born in and/or have lived in Monroe, Louisiana, United States. For a list of people who have studied at the University of Louisiana at Monroe, see List of University of Louisiana at Monroe alumni.

== Actors and entertainers ==
- Kevin Griffin, singer, songwriter and guitarist of Better Than Ezra
- Clay Jordan, contestant on Survivor: Thailand
- Valerie Mason, September 2008 Playboy Playmate
- Mighty Sam McClain, soul blues singer and songwriter
- Mantan Moreland, actor and comic of the 1930s and 1940s
- Jesse Pearson, actor and screenwriter; died in Monroe in 1979
- Parker Posey, film actress
- Monti Sharp, film and soap opera actor
- Susan Ward, film and soap opera actress

== Businesspeople ==
- Samuel B. Fuller (1905–1988), entrepreneur and journalist, founder of Fuller Products Company
- Collett E. Woolman (1889–1966), an original director and founder of Delta Air Service

== Journalists ==
- Frank McGee, television journalist

== Musicians ==
- Fred Anderson, jazz saxophonist and club owner
- Stewart Cararas, musician, songwriter and record producer
- Hamid Drake, jazz drummer and percussionist
- Doug Duffey, singer, songwriter, pianist, bandleader, music arranger, record producer, music publisher, poet, diarist, photographer and visual artist
- Carl Fontana, jazz trombonist
- Julie Giroux, composer and pianist
- Kevin Griffin, lead singer of Better Than Ezra
- Andy Griggs, country music singer
- Ivory Joe Hunter, rhythm and blues musician
- Rickey Minor, music director, composer, music producer, and music director and bandleader for The Tonight Show with Jay Leno
- Webb Pierce, country musician
- Frank Ticheli, composer, conductor, professor emeritus of Music at University of Southern California

== Politicians ==
- Edwards Barham, former member of the Louisiana State Senate from Morehouse Parish
- William Derwood Cann Jr. (1919–2010), World War II lieutenant colonel; interim mayor of Monroe 1978–1979
- Donnie Copeland (born 1961), Pentecostal pastor in North Little Rock, Arkansas, and Republican member of the Arkansas House of Representatives, 2015 to 2017, born in Monroe
- James L. Dennis (born 1936), Judge of the United States Court of Appeals for the Fifth Circuit
- Jimmy Dimos, former Speaker of the Louisiana House of Representatives and retired judge
- William C. Feazel (1895–1965), interim U.S. Senator in 1948; member of the Louisiana House of Representatives 1932–1936; father-in-law of Shady R. Wall
- W. L. "Jack" Howard (1921–2004), former mayor of Monroe and owner with his brother, Alton Hardy Howard of the former Howard Brothers Discount Stores
- Marcus Hunter (born 1979), member of the Louisiana House of Representatives from District 17 in Ouachita Parish
- Julia Letlow (born 1981), U.S. representative for Louisiana
- Vance McAllister, businessman and U.S. representative elected in Louisiana's 5th congressional district special election, 2013
- Newt V. Mills, U.S. representative from Louisiana's 5th congressional district 1937–1943; resided in Monroe
- Jay Morris, state representative from Ouachita and Morehouse parishes, 2012–
- Huey P. Newton (1942–1989) co-founder of the Black Panther Party, born in Monroe
- James A. Noe, short-term governor of Louisiana in 1936; founder of WNOE and KNOE radio and TV stations
- Abe E. Pierce III (1934–2021), mayor of Monroe 1996–2000, first African American in the position; Ouachita Parish educator
- Robert E. Powell (1923–1997), mayor of Monroe 1979–1996
- Melvin Rambin (1941–2001), mayor of Monroe 2000–2001, only Republican in the position since Reconstruction; banker in Baton Rouge and Monroe; interred in Baton Rouge
- Frank Spooner, oil and natural gas producer and Republican politician, moved to Monroe in 1967
- Jeff R. Thompson, former insurance agent in Monroe; state representative from Bossier Parish; incoming 26th Judicial District Court judge
- J. Robert Wooley (born 1953), Louisiana Commissioner of Insurance, 2000–2006; spent his high school and college years in Monroe

== Athletes ==
- Brian Bateman, PGA golfer, 2007 Buick Open winner
- Benoit Benjamin, NBA center for the Cleveland Cavaliers
- Bubby Brister, Denver Broncos quarterback
- Ronnie Coleman, retired professional bodybuilder; former middle linebacker Grambling State University
- John David Crow, late coach of the ULM Warhawks; professional football player
- LaceDarius Dunn, basketball guard with Bnei HaSharon in Israel
- Billy Joe DuPree, tight end for the Dallas Cowboys
- Chuck Finley, MLB All-Star pitcher, California Angels, Cleveland Indians and St. Louis Cardinals; ex-spouse of Tawny Kitaen
- Ralph Garr, All-Star MLB outfielder
- Larry Gordon, football player
- James Harris, NFL quarterback
- Gerrod Henderson, basketball player for the Anwil Włocławek 2007–09
- Tyree Hollins, football player
- Cardia Jackson, Louisiana–Monroe Warhawk and Green Bay Packers linebacker
- Bradie James, LSU and Dallas Cowboys linebacker
- Shawn King, ULM/LSU and Carolina Panthers defensive end
- Lynn McGlothen, MLB pitcher
- Paul Millsap, power forward for Louisiana Tech University and the Atlanta Hawks
- Rudy Niswanger, LSU and Kansas City Chiefs center
- Cassidy O'Reilly, professional wrestler, WWE TNA
- Joe Profit, Atlanta Falcons and New Orleans Saints running back
- Phil Robertson, quarterback for Louisiana Tech Bulldogs
- Johnny Robinson, LSU and Kansas City Chiefs safety
- Barry Rubin (born 1957), Head Strength and Conditioning Coach of the Kansas City Chiefs in the National Football League
- Bill Russell, NBA center for the Boston Celtics), Basketball Hall of Famer
- Ben Sheets, MLB All-Star Milwaukee Brewers, Oakland Athletics and Atlanta Braves pitcher; played at NLU, now ULM
- Cam Sims, Alabama and wide receiver for Las Vegas Raiders
- Storm Warren (born 1988), basketball player in the Israeli Basketball Premier League
- Sammy White, football player, GSU and Offensive Rookie of Year receiver for Minnesota Vikings
- Andrew Whitworth, LSU and Cincinnati Bengals offensive tackle
- Jonathan Wilhite, Auburn and New England Patriots cornerback
- Aeneas Williams, St. Louis Rams free safety
- Pat Williams, NFL defensive tackle for the Buffalo Bills and Minnesota Vikings
- Ralph Williams, gridiron football player
- Don Wilson, MLB pitcher for the Houston Astros
- Will Campbell, NFL offensive lineman for the New England Patriots
- Larry Wright, GSU and NBA guard for the Washington Bullets

== Writers ==
- Harry W. Addison, writer and humorist
- Dixon Hearne, writer and poet
- Speed Lamkin, novelist and playwright

== Others ==
- Guy Banister, career employee of the FBI and private investigator; alleged co-conspirator in assassination of John F. Kennedy
- James E. Cofer, president of the University of Louisiana at Monroe 2002–2010
- Bruce M. Davis, Manson family member serving life sentence for murder
- Robert Pershing Foster, a subject of Isabel Wilkerson's book The Warmth of Other Suns
- W. C. Friley, Baptist clergyman; second president of Louisiana College; pastor in Monroe in the early 1880s
- Hugh H. Goodwin, vice admiral in the United States Navy
- Marguerite Littman, American-British socialite and HIV/AIDS activist
- Rowena Spencer; first female pediatric surgeon
- Marc Swayze, comic book writer and illustrator
- Emily H. Vokes, malacologist and Tulane University professor
- A. Wilberforce Williams (1865–1940), African American physician, teacher, and journalist; born in Monroe and raised on a plantation
