= 2015 Saskatchewan Roughriders season =

CFL team season

- General manager: Brendan Taman (0–9); Jeremy O'Day (3–6)
- Head coach: Corey Chamblin (0–9); Bob Dyce (3–6)
- Home stadium: Mosaic Stadium at Taylor Field

Results
- Record: 3–15
- Division place: 5th, West
- Playoffs: did not qualify
- Team MOP: Jeff Knox, Jr.
- Team MOC: Rob Bagg
- Team MOR: Jeff Knox, Jr.

Uniform

The 2015 Saskatchewan Roughriders season was the 58th season for the team in the Canadian Football League (CFL). The Roughriders finished with a 3–15 record and failed to qualify for the playoffs. For the third consecutive season, the club held their training camp at Griffiths Stadium in Saskatoon with the main camp beginning on May 31. On 30 August 2015, with their ninth straight loss and a record of 0 wins and 9 losses, the Roughriders achieved the third-worst start to a season in club history. On October 9, 2015, following a loss to the Hamilton Tiger-Cats, the Roughriders were officially eliminated from post-season contention.

== Offseason ==
=== CFL draft ===
The 2015 CFL draft took place on May 12, 2015. The Roughriders had seven selections in the seven-round draft, including the acquisition of an additional sixth-round pick for Dwight Anderson and the loss of their second-round pick after trading for Cory Watson.

Round	Pick	Player	Position	School/Club team
1	6	Nic Demski	WR	Manitoba
3	26	Rory Connop	DL	Western
4	35	Matt Rea	FB	Michigan State
5	42	Kwame Adjei	DB	Mount Allison
6	47	Tyler Langlais	DL	Calgary
6	50	Melvin Abankwah	RB	Saint Mary's
7	59	Brandon Tennant	DL	Laval

== Preseason ==
On June 14, 2013, it was announced that the Edmonton Eskimos would host their 2015 preseason game at the new SMS Equipment Stadium at Shell Place in Fort McMurray against the Roughriders on June 13, 2015. As part of the deal, the game was broadcast nationally on TSN. The game was played here due to scheduling conflicts with the 2015 FIFA Women's World Cup at Commonwealth Stadium and to broaden the Eskimos' fanbase.

Week	Date	Kickoff	Opponent	Results		TV	Venue	Attendance	Summary
Week	Date	Kickoff	Opponent	Score	Record	TV	Venue	Attendance	Summary
A	Bye								
B	Sat, June 13	8:00 p.m. CST	at Edmonton Eskimos	L 24–31	0–1	TSN	SMS Equipment Stadium (in Fort McMurray)	11,825	Recap
C	Fri, June 19	7:30 p.m. CST	vs. Calgary Stampeders	L 29–37	0–2	None	Mosaic Stadium	18,170	Recap

# Games played with primary home uniforms.

== Regular season ==
=== Season standings ===
West Division
Team	GP	W	L	PF	PA	Pts	
Edmonton Eskimos	18	14	4	466	341	28	Details
Calgary Stampeders	18	14	4	478	346	28	Details
BC Lions	18	7	11	437	486	14	Details
Winnipeg Blue Bombers	18	5	13	353	502	10	Details
Saskatchewan Roughriders	18	3	15	430	563	6	Details

=== Schedule ===
Week	Date	Kickoff	Opponent	Results		TV	Venue	Attendance	Summary
Week	Date	Kickoff	Opponent	Score	Record	TV	Venue	Attendance	Summary
1	Sat, June 27	6:00 p.m. CST	vs. Winnipeg Blue Bombers	L 26–30	0–1	TSN	Mosaic Stadium	32,228	Recap
2	Sun, July 5	1:30 p.m. CST	vs. Toronto Argonauts	L 40–42 (OT)	0–2	TSN/RDS2	Mosaic Stadium	31,907	Recap
3	Fri, July 10	8:00 p.m. CST	at BC Lions	L 32–35 (OT)	0–3	TSN/RDS	BC Place	23,062	Recap
4	Fri, July 17	8:00 p.m. CST	vs. BC Lions	L 24–27	0–4	TSN/RDS	Mosaic Stadium	26,159	Recap
5	Sun, July 26	5:00 p.m. CST	vs. Hamilton Tiger-Cats	L 21–31	0–5	TSN	Mosaic Stadium	31,683	Recap
6	Fri, July 31	7:00 p.m. CST	at Edmonton Eskimos	L 5–30	0–6	TSN/RDS/ESPN2	Commonwealth Stadium	37,842	Recap
7	Sat, Aug 8	5:00 p.m. CST	at Toronto Argonauts	L 26–30	0–7	TSN	Rogers Centre	20,642	Recap
8	Bye								
9	Sat, Aug 22	5:00 p.m. CST	vs. Calgary Stampeders	L 31–34	0–8	TSN	Mosaic Stadium	33,427	Recap
10	Sun, Aug 30	2:00 p.m. CST	at Ottawa Redblacks	L 13–35	0–9	TSN/RDS2/ESPN2	TD Place Stadium	24,468	Recap
ǁ11ǁ	Sun, Sep 6	2:00 p.m. CST	vs. Winnipeg Blue Bombers	W 37–19	1–9	TSN	Mosaic Stadium	33,427	Recap
12	Sat, Sept 12	4:30 p.m. CST	at Winnipeg Blue Bombers	L 7–22	1–10	TSN/RDS2	Investors Group Field	35,156	Recap
13	Sat, Sept 19	7:00 p.m. CST	vs. Ottawa Redblacks	L 27–30	1–11	TSN/RDS2	Mosaic Stadium	30,480	Recap
ǁ14ǁ	Sun, Sept 27	2:00 p.m. CST	vs. Montreal Alouettes	W 33–21	2–11	TSN/RDS	Mosaic Stadium	30,843	Recap
15	Sat, Oct 3	5:00 p.m. CST	at BC Lions	L 20–46	2–12	TSN	BC Place	24,554	Recap
16	Fri, Oct 9	5:30 p.m. CST	at Hamilton Tiger-Cats	L 15–30	2–13	TSN	Tim Hortons Field	24,222	Recap
17	Bye								
ǁ18ǁ	Sat, Oct 24	5:00 p.m. CST	vs. Edmonton Eskimos	L 24–35	2–14	TSN/RDS2	Mosaic Stadium	30,488	Recap
19	Sat, Oct 31	1:00 p.m. CST	at Calgary Stampeders	L 19–42	2–15	TSN/RDS2	McMahon Stadium	31,591	Recap
20	Sun, Nov 8	12:00 p.m. CST	at Montreal Alouettes	W 30–24 (OT)	3–15	TSN/RDS	Molson Stadium	20,551	Recap

# Games played with primary home uniforms.
# Games played with white uniforms.
ǁ # ǁ Games played with retro alternate uniforms.
# Games played with signature series uniforms.

== Roster ==
2015 Saskatchewan Roughriders final roster
Quarterbacks: 19 Keith Price; 5 Blake Sims; 16 Brett Smith; Running backs: 26 Anthony Allen; 45 Carl Fitzgerald; 33 Stephen Houston; 80 Spencer Moore; 47 Matt Rea; Receivers: 6 Rob Bagg; 87 Alex Carroll; 81 Marcus Davis; 7 Weston Dressler; 84 S. J. Haidara; 85 Ryan Lankford; 82 Naaman Roosevelt; 2 Ryan Smith	Offensive linemen: 66 Chris Best G; 58 Xavier Fulton T; 54 Jermarcus Hardrick T; 57 Brendon LaBatte G; 53 Matt Vonk G; 69 Corey Watman C; Defensive linemen: 92 Tim Agbaje DT; 97 John Chick DE; 95 Rory Connop DT; 93 Tearrius George DT; 52 Ryan Wellman DE; 98 Markus White DE; Special teams: 14 Tyler Crapigna K; 39 Ray Early P/K; 46 Jorgen Hus LS	Linebackers: 28 Denicos Allen; 41 Tyron Brackenridge; 52 Nehemie Kankolongo; 42 Nathan Kanya; 49 Jeff Knox; 48 Kyle Norris; 43 Kevin Régimbald-Gagné; Defensive backs: 1 Marshay Green; 37 Tyree Hollins; 38 Tristan Jackson; 17 Hugo Lopez; 29 Junior Mertile; 22 Don Unamba; 25 Matt Webster; 21 Paul Woldu; Reserve roster: 50 Jake Doughty LB; Practice roster: 31 LaVance Taylor RB; 8 LaQuan Williams WR	Injured list: 64 Levy Adcock T; 90 Dylan Ainsworth DE; 35 Weldon Brown DB; 67 Dan Clark G; 9 Nic Demski SB; 4 Darian Durant QB; 11 Shea Emry LB; 89 Chris Getzlaf SB; 0 Alex Hall DE; 3 Macho Harris DB; 24 Keenan MacDougall DB; 20 Terrell Maze DB; 15 Paul McCallum K; 18 Scott McHenry SB; 99 Andre Monroe DT; 14 Jamel Richardson SB; 94 Cameron Sheffield DE; 88 Taj Smith WR; 30 Chad Spann RB; 51 Levi Steinhauer LS; 27 Alex Suber DB; 91 Brandon Tennant DT; 70 Derek Walker DT; 32 Dan West DB; Italics indicate International player

== Coaching staff ==
On September 1, the team fired the General Manager, Brendan Taman, and the head coach, Corey Chamblin, following an 0-9 start to the season.

2015 Saskatchewan Roughriders staff
Front office: President and ceo – Craig Reynolds; Interim general manager and director of football operations – Jeremy O'Day; Director of player personnel and canadian scouting – Craig Smith; U.S. Scout – Ron Selesky; Manager of Media Relations & Football Communications – Ryan Pollock; Director of athletic therapy – Ivan Gutfriend; Manager of equipment – Gordon Gilroy; Manager of football research and development – Chad Hudson; Manager of football administration – Aaron Thompson; Head coaches: Head coach – Bob Dyce; Offensive coaches: Offensive coordinator and quarterbacks – Jacques Chapdelaine; Offensive line – Dan Dorazio; Running backs – Avon Cobourne; Receivers – Jeremaine Copeland; Offensive assistant – Justin Chapdelaine	Defensive coaches: Defensive coordinator – Greg Quick; Defensive line – Mike Sinclair; Linebackers – Tyrone Pettaway; Defensive backs – Tony Missick; Special teams coaches: Special teams coordinator – Bob Dyce; Special teams assistant – Cory McDiarmid; Strength and conditioning: Strength and conditioning coordinator – Dan Farthing; → Coaching staff
