= List of University of Louisiana at Monroe alumni =

This is a list of notable people who have attended University of Louisiana at Monroe.

== Arts, entertainment, and humanities ==
- Tim Brando – CBS Sports and Fox Sports Net studio radio host
- Tim McGraw – country singer, spouse of Faith Hill
- Rob Redding – syndicated talk show host
- Marc Swayze – comic book artist and writer; former ULM art faculty member

== Business ==
- Willie Robertson – owner and CEO of Duck Commander, which appears on the A&E series Duck Dynasty

== Government ==
=== Executive ===
- William Derwood Cann, Jr. – interim mayor of Monroe 1978–1979 (D); attended Ouachita Parish Junior College in 1937–1938; chairman of ULM Military Department 1954–1956
- Melvin Rambin (Class of 1963) – mayor of Monroe, 2000–2001 (R)
- J. Robert Wooley (Class of 1974) – Louisiana insurance commissioner 2000–2006 (D)

=== Judiciary ===
- Marcus R. Clark – Louisiana Supreme Court justice (R)
- William Wiley Norris, III (1936–2016) – city, district, and circuit court judge from West Monroe (D)
- William H. Pryor, Jr. – federal judge (R)
- Chet D. Traylor – associate justice Louisiana Supreme Court, 1997–2009; Republican primary candidate for U.S. Senate, 2010 (R)

=== Legislative ===
- Edwards Barham – first Republican elected to the Louisiana State Senate since Reconstruction; from Oak Ridge (R)
- William R. "Billy" Boles, Sr. – former member of Louisiana State Senate (D)
- Roy A. Burrell (B. S. Mathematics) – member of the Louisiana House for Caddo and Bossier parishes since 2004 (D)
- Donnie Copeland – Pentecostal pastor in North Little Rock, Arkansas, and member of the Arkansas House of Representatives 2015–2017
- J. C. Gilbert – member of both Louisiana legislative chambers
- Ronnie Johns – former pharmacist, state legislator from Sulphur (R)
- Julia Letlow - US senator-elect from Louisiana and member of the U.S. House of Representatives from Louisiana's 5th congressional district since 2021
- Speedy Long – member of the Louisiana State Senate 1956–1964, and United States House of Representatives 1965–1973 (D)
- Vance McAllister – U.S. representative, won his seat in Louisiana's 5th congressional district special election, 2013; unseated in 2014 by Ralph Abraham (R)
- Jay McCallum (Class of 1982) – former state representative for Lincoln and Union parishes (D); judge since 2003 of the Louisiana 3rd Judicial District court
- Fred H. Mills, Jr. (Pharmacy, 1976) – state representative from St. Martin Parish (R)
- Jonathan W. Perry (B.A., 1995) – state representative from Vermilion and Cameron parishes (R)
- Neil Riser – member of Louisiana State Senate (R)
- Jeff R. Thompson – former football player and sports announcer; lawyer, member of the Louisiana House from Bossier City since 2012; incoming judge of the 26th Judicial District Court (R)

== Sports ==
=== Football ===
- Marty Booker – NFL football player for the Chicago Bears, Miami Dolphins, and Atlanta Falcons
- Vincent Brisby – NFL football player for the New England Patriots
- Bubby Brister – quarterback, Pittsburgh Steelers, Philadelphia Eagles, New York Jets, Denver Broncos, and Minnesota Vikings
- Jimmy Childress – assistant coach of Neville High School 1958–1973 and head coach at Ruston High School 1979–1991; received undergraduate degree at ULM, coached football and baseball at ULM 1974–1976
- Pat Dennis – NFL football player for the Kansas City Chiefs
- Jimmy Edwards – professional football player
- Marcus Green – NFL wide receiver for Philadelphia Eagles
- Jackie Harris – NFL football player for the Green Bay Packers
- Sam Hughes – quarterback, Miami Hooters
- Stan Humphries – quarterback, San Diego Chargers Super Bowl XXIX
- Doug Pederson – NFL quarterback for the Miami Dolphins, Green Bay Packers, Philadelphia Eagles, Cleveland Browns, and the Rhein Fire in the World League of American Football; member of the Green Bay Packers Championship team for Super Bowl XXXI; offensive coordinator, Kansas City Chiefs; former offensive QC coach and quarterback coach, Philadelphia Eagles
- Lenzy Pipkins – football player
- Roosevelt Potts – NFL football player for the Indianapolis Colts
- Don Shows – football coach at ULM (graduate assistant, 1985) and West Monroe High School since 1989, winner of eight Louisiana Class 5A state championships
- Pete Thomas – football player
- Larry Whigham – NFL football player for the New England Patriots
- Stepfret Williams – NFL football player for the Dallas Cowboys and the Cincinnati Bengals

=== Basketball ===
- Kristy Curry (née Sims) – head coach of the Texas Tech Lady Raiders basketball team

=== Baseball ===
- Steve Bourgeois – former MLB pitcher
- Wayne Causey – MLB shortstop
- Chuck Finley – MLB pitcher California Angels, ex-spouse of Tawny Kitaen
- Ben Sheets – 2000 Olympics gold medalist; winning pitcher versus Cuba for gold, MLB pitcher, Atlanta Braves
