= Farmerville, Louisiana =

- Town
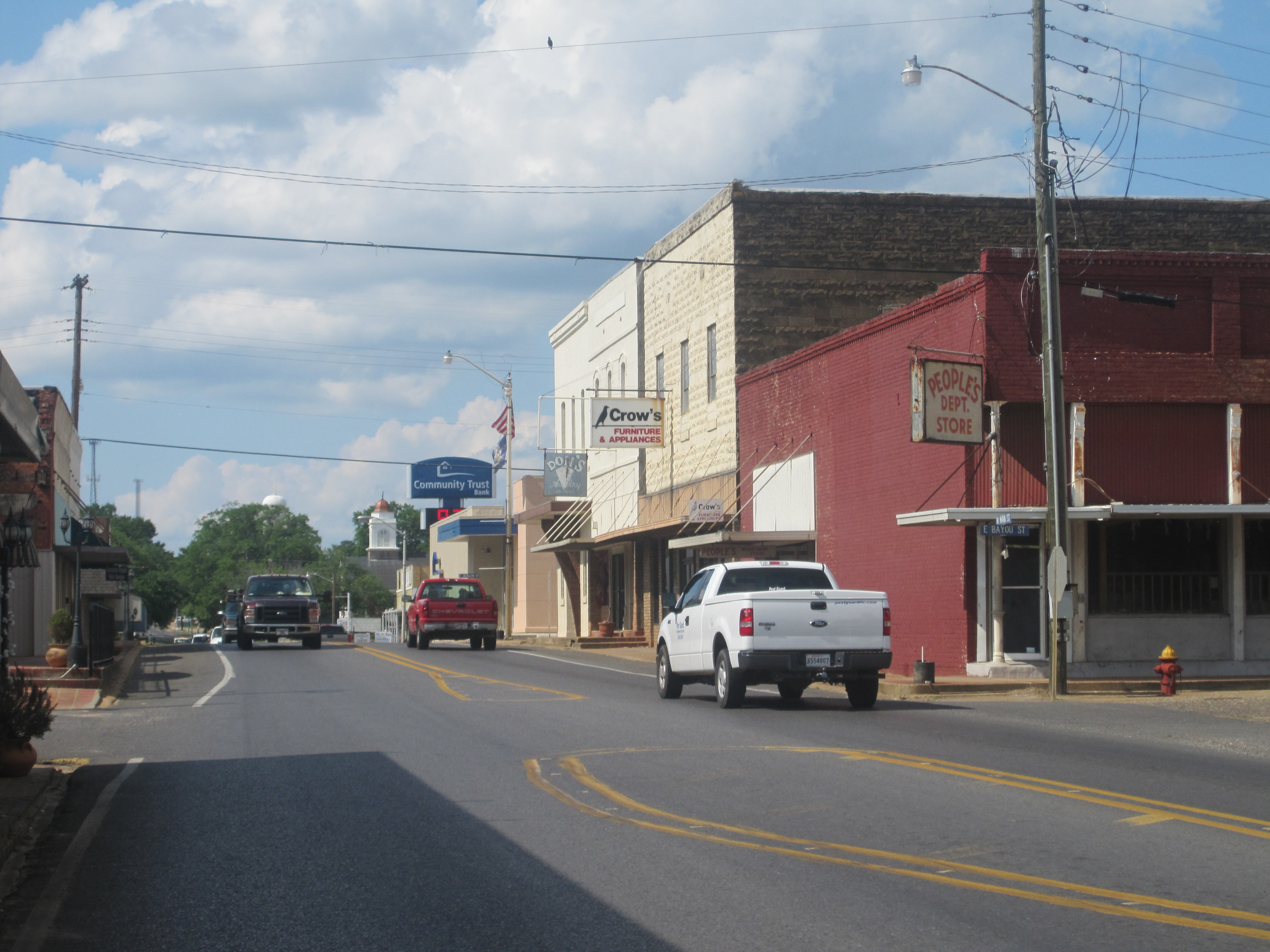
- Downtown Farmerville (2010)

- Location of Farmerville in Union Parish, Louisiana.

- Location of Louisiana in the United States
- Coordinates: 32°45′42″N 92°24′50″W
- Country: United States
- State: Louisiana
- Parish: Union

Area
  - Total: 5.88 sq mi (15.23 km^{2})
  - Land: 5.78 sq mi (14.97 km^{2})
  - Water: 0.10 sq mi (0.26 km^{2})
- Elevation: 154 ft (47 m)

Population (2020)
  - Total: 3,366
  - Density: 582.4/sq mi (224.85/km^{2})
- Time zone: UTC-6 (CST)
  - Summer (DST): UTC-5 (CDT)
- ZIP Code: 71241
- Area code: 318
- FIPS code: 22-25160
- GNIS feature ID: 2406491
- Website: farmerville.org

Farmerville is a town in and the parish seat of Union Parish, Louisiana, United States. It has also been known as Farmersville. As of the 2020 census, Farmerville had a population of 3,366. It is part of the Monroe Metropolitan Statistical Area. The town is spread about Lake D'Arbonne, a popular fishing and boating waterway.

== Geography ==
According to the United States Census Bureau, the town has a total area of 5.6 square miles (15 km^{2}), of which 5.5 square miles (14 km^{2}) is land and 0.04 square miles (0.10 km^{2}) (0.72%) is water.

=== Climate ===
The climate in this area is characterized by hot, humid summers and generally mild to cool winters. According to the Köppen Climate Classification system, Farmerville has a humid subtropical climate, abbreviated "Cfa" on climate maps.

Climate data for Farmerville, Louisiana (1991–2020)
Month	Jan	Feb	Mar	Apr	May	Jun	Jul	Aug	Sep	Oct	Nov	Dec	Year
Mean daily maximum °F (°C)	56.0 (13.3)	60.0 (15.6)	68.4 (20.2)	75.7 (24.3)	82.5 (28.1)	89.4 (31.9)	92.4 (33.6)	92.6 (33.7)	87.0 (30.6)	77.1 (25.1)	65.6 (18.7)	57.7 (14.3)	75.4 (24.1)
Daily mean °F (°C)	45.8 (7.7)	49.6 (9.8)	56.9 (13.8)	64.4 (18.0)	72.6 (22.6)	79.5 (26.4)	82.6 (28.1)	82.6 (28.1)	76.5 (24.7)	65.9 (18.8)	55.0 (12.8)	47.8 (8.8)	64.9 (18.3)
Mean daily minimum °F (°C)	35.7 (2.1)	39.2 (4.0)	45.5 (7.5)	53.2 (11.8)	62.8 (17.1)	69.6 (20.9)	72.8 (22.7)	72.6 (22.6)	66.0 (18.9)	54.7 (12.6)	44.3 (6.8)	38.0 (3.3)	54.5 (12.5)
Average precipitation inches (mm)	5.96 (151)	4.60 (117)	5.41 (137)	5.87 (149)	5.13 (130)	4.75 (121)	4.12 (105)	3.76 (96)	4.04 (103)	4.48 (114)	5.08 (129)	4.99 (127)	58.19 (1,479)
Average snowfall inches (cm)	0.5 (1.3)	0.6 (1.5)	0.1 (0.25)	0.0 (0.0)	0.0 (0.0)	0.0 (0.0)	0.0 (0.0)	0.0 (0.0)	0.0 (0.0)	0.0 (0.0)	0.0 (0.0)	0.0 (0.0)	1.2 (3.05)
Source: NOAA

==== 2022 tornado ====
On December 13, 2022, the northern part of the town was struck by an EF3 tornado that damaged or destroyed structures and injured 14 people. The tornado caused $1.2 million in damage, with most of the damage coming from the town.

== Demographics ==
Historical population
Census	Pop.	Note	%±
1870	272		—
1880	712		161.8%
1890	472		−33.7%
1900	458		−3.0%
1910	598		30.6%
1920	632		5.7%
1930	1,137		79.9%
1940	1,428		25.6%
1950	2,173		52.2%
1960	2,727		25.5%
1970	3,416		25.3%
1980	3,768		10.3%
1990	3,334		−11.5%
2000	3,808		14.2%
2010	3,860		1.4%
2020	3,366		−12.8%
2025 (est.)	3,432	▲	2.0%
U.S. Decennial Census

=== 2020 census ===
As of the 2020 census, Farmerville had a population of 3,366. The median age was 39.5 years. 24.2% of residents were under the age of 18 and 19.8% of residents were 65 years of age or older. For every 100 females there were 92.1 males, and for every 100 females age 18 and over there were 88.6 males age 18 and over.

0.0% of residents lived in urban areas, while 100.0% lived in rural areas.

There were 1,311 households in Farmerville, including 552 families, of which 33.9% had children under the age of 18 living in them. Of all households, 25.9% were married-couple households, 20.7% were households with a male householder and no spouse or partner present, and 47.6% were households with a female householder and no spouse or partner present. About 33.6% of all households were made up of individuals and 13.7% had someone living alone who was 65 years of age or older.

There were 1,510 housing units, of which 13.2% were vacant. The homeowner vacancy rate was 1.6% and the rental vacancy rate was 10.5%.

Farmerville racial composition as of 2020
Race	Number	Percentage
White (non-Hispanic)	950	28.22%
Black or African American (non-Hispanic)	2,162	64.23%
Native American	10	0.3%
Asian	9	0.27%
Other/Mixed	93	2.76%
Hispanic or Latino	142	4.22%

== Education ==
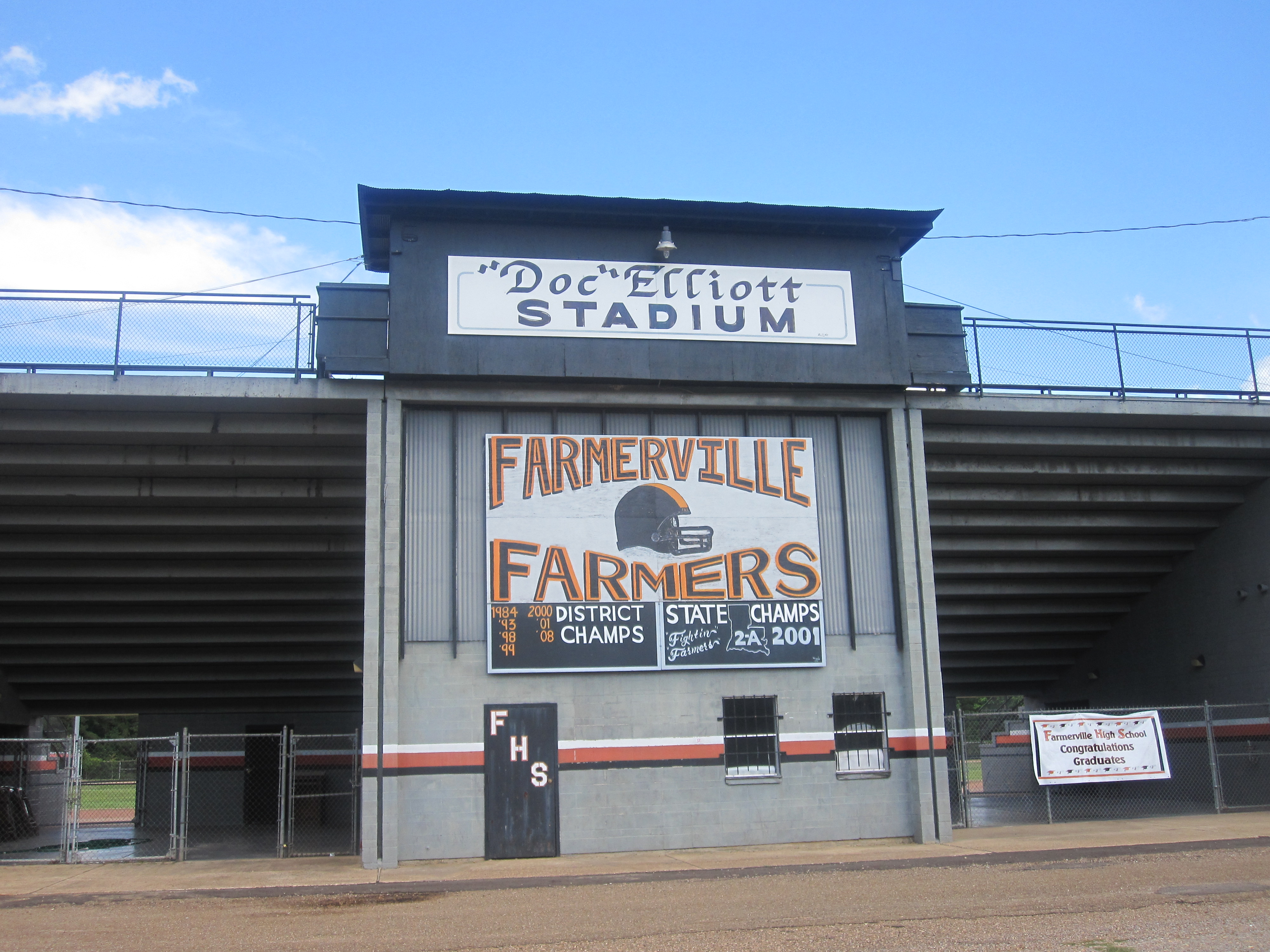
"Doc" Elliott Stadium (2010)

The Union Parish School District covers education in the Farmerville area.

=== Schools ===
- Union Parish Elementary School
- Union Parish Junior High School
- Union Parish High School
- Union Christian Academy
- Downsville Charter School
- D'Arbonne Woods Charter School

=== Former Schools ===
Farmerville High School

== Notable people ==
- Thomas "Bud" Brady, member of the Louisiana House of Representatives from 1976 to 1988 from La Salle Parish
- Donovan Chapman, Country music artist
- James Walter Elder, was a member of the United States House of Representatives and a mayor of Farmerville
- William C. Feazel, interim U.S. Senator in 1948; member of the Louisiana House of Representatives
- T. T. Fields, member of the Louisiana House of Representatives
- Alton Hardy Howard, co-founder of Howard Brothers Discount Stores
- W. L. "Jack" Howard, five-term mayor of Monroe
- V. E. Howard, Church of Christ clergyman who founded the International Gospel Hour on radio
- Jay McCallum (born 1960), state court judge and state representative for Lincoln and Union parishes.
