= Matt Rea =

Matt Rea may refer to:

- Matthew Rea (born 1991), gridiron football fullback
- Matt Rea (Gaelic footballer) (1873–1942), Irish Gaelic footballer
