= Agbaje =

Agbaje is a surname. Notable people with the surname include:

- Adewunmi Agbaje, Nigerian politician
- Anike Agbaje-Williams (1936–2025), Nigerian newsreader
- Bola Agbaje (born c. 1981), British playwright
- Esther Agbaje (born 1985), Nigerian-American attorney and politician
- Salami Agbaje (1880–1953), Nigerian businessman
- Tim Agbaje (born 1990), Canadian football player
