= Rambin (surname) =

Rambin is a surname. Notable people with the surname include:

- Leven Rambin (born 1990), American actress
- Melvin Rambin (1941–2001), American banker and politician
