= V. E. Howard =

American radio evangelist (1911–2000)

- Howard in his younger years
- Born: Verna Elisha Howard; September 29, 1911; Rocky Branch Community; Union Parish, Louisiana, US
- Died: September 28, 2000 (aged 88); Texarkana, Texas, US
- Resting place: Rocky Branch Cemetery in Union Parish
- Occupations: Minister radio broadcaster businessman
- Children: 3, including Vernon Edgar Howard
- Relatives: W. L. "Jack" Howard (brother); Alton Hardy Howard (brother); Korie Robertson (great niece)

Verna Elisha Howard (September 29, 1911 – September 28, 2000), known as V. E. Howard, was an American minister and radio evangelist based in Texarkana, Texas, who founded the International Gospel Hour.

== Family background ==
Howard was the oldest of six children born in the Rocky Branch community near Farmerville in Union Parish in North Louisiana to Elisha John "Hardy" Howard (1889–1974) and the former Corinne Smith (1888–1971). His father was a Baptist and his mother was a member of the church of Christ. Two of his younger brothers, W. L. "Jack" Howard and Alton Hardy Howard, were the co-founders in 1946 of Howard Brothers Jewelry and in 1959 the chain store, Howard Brothers Discount Stores, based in Monroe, where Jack Howard was the mayor from 1956 to 1972 and 1976 to 1978. V. E. Howard was also an original partner of Howard Jewelers. The youngest of the Howard siblings, Kelton Leroy Howard (1928–1994), died exactly two weeks after the passing of former Mayor Jack Howard. The Howard brothers had two sisters, Euphra Irene Howard Terry (1914–1980) and Cassyle Duvonne Howard McMurry (1918–1989).

On December 20, 1931, Howard married Ruth Moryne Jackson (1909–2000) in Corsicana in central Texas. They had three children: Jasper Smith Howard, Vernon Edgar Howard, and Marilyn Kay Howard.

== Ministry ==
Howard attended Abilene Christian College in Abilene, Texas, Harding College in Searcy, Arkansas, and what is now Arkansas State University in Jonesboro, Arkansas. In a preaching career of a half-century, he was based in Hot Springs, Arkansas; Conway, Arkansas; Greenville, Texas; and Texarkana, Texas. His longest tenure was at the Walnut Street Church of Christ in Texarkana.

Howard preached via radio for forty-six years. He was known for the question, "Are you listening?" which he used to emphasize important points or Scriptures in his lessons. His sermon entitled, "What Is The Church of Christ?" brought what is considered possibly the greatest response ever to a religious broadcast in radio history. He mailed more than 75,000 free copies of this particular sermon. Howard, at the age of eighty-four in 1995, on the advice of his physicians, transferred the International Gospel Hour to the West Fayetteville Church of Christ in Fayetteville in Lincoln County in southern Tennessee, under the minister Winford Claiborne.

Howard led revival meetings in twenty states and baptized some eight thousand converts. Howard penned eighteen Christian books and more than fifty tracts. He was the president of the Central Printers and Publishers Company and Howard Foundations, Inc. Like his brother, Alton, V. E. Howard published a Christian hymnal; V. E. Howard's "Gospel Songs and Hymns" has 870 selections.

== Death and legacy ==
Howard died in Texarkana some eight months after the passing of his wife. His saying "Are You Listening?", from his book 35 Years, Are You Listening? is inscribed on their gravestone at the Rocky Branch Cemetery in Union Parish.

Wallace Skipper, a Howard associate, summarized the evangelist's career:

He was a valiant and energetic individual. In addition to being a successful businessman, he was a very able speaker, preacher, and gifted writer. It has been said "the search for truth is the noblest occupation of man, its publication a duty."
