= Detrick DeBurr =

American businessman and writer (born 1969)

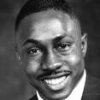
- Born: Detrick Van DeBurr; October 25, 1969 (age 56); Monroe, Louisiana, US
- Occupations: Businessman, politician, writer

Detrick DeBurr (born October 25, 1969) is an American entrepreneur, author, software developer, and Democratic Party politician who has been a candidate for the Texas House of Representatives from District 65 in 2024 and 2026. He has written books such as Deal Us In! How Black America Can Play and Win in the Digital Economy and Build Gamified Websites with PHP and JQuery. He is a co-founder of Game Time Giving. Prior to this, he was Founder/CEO of Digital Rhythm Inc., an IT service provider based in Dallas, Texas, USA.

== Early life and education ==
DeBurr was born and raised in Monroe, Louisiana. He graduated from Neville High School in 1987 then later attended Southern University in Baton Rouge, Louisiana. He received a computer information systems degree from DeVry University after moving to Dallas, where he now resides.

== Career ==
In February 2000, DeBurr left an up-and-coming corporate CAREER with GTE Directories (Verizon Information Services) to start Digital Rhythm Inc. Digital Rhythm is a Dallas, Texas based Information Technology services provider. Digital Rhythm specializes in providing sub-contract Information Technology services to prime Information Technology contractors.

DeBurr has published two books, "Build Gamified Websites with PHP and JQuery" (Packt Publishing) in September 2013 and "Deal Us In! How Black America can Play and Win in the Digital Economy" (Anji Publishing Inc.), in October 2002. In 2001, DeBurr received Stanford University's Digital Visions Fellowship for his efforts on projects addressing the "Digital Divide" all over world with extended work done in Ghana, West Africa. He has been a frequent lecturer on technology related issues all around the world. He is the former host of "CyWord" an online radio technology program aired by The Black World Today. In 2011 he founded CUPID! On The Go, a mobile application where users can get access to local news.

== Political Career ==
DeBurr served as a member of a local planning and zoning commission for more than 18 years before entering electoral politics. In 2024, DeBurr ran as the Democratic nominee for District 65 of the Texas House of Representatives, losing to Republican incumbent Mitch Little in the general election. He announced a rematch campaign for the 2026 election in December 2025, running unopposed in the Democratic primary. His campaign has centered on affordability for working families, increased funding for public education, and government transparency, including a proposal he calls the "Texas Local Living Wage Act," which would let cities set minimum wages based on local cost of living.
