= List of mayors of Monroe, Louisiana =

The following is a list of mayors of the city of Monroe, Louisiana, United States.

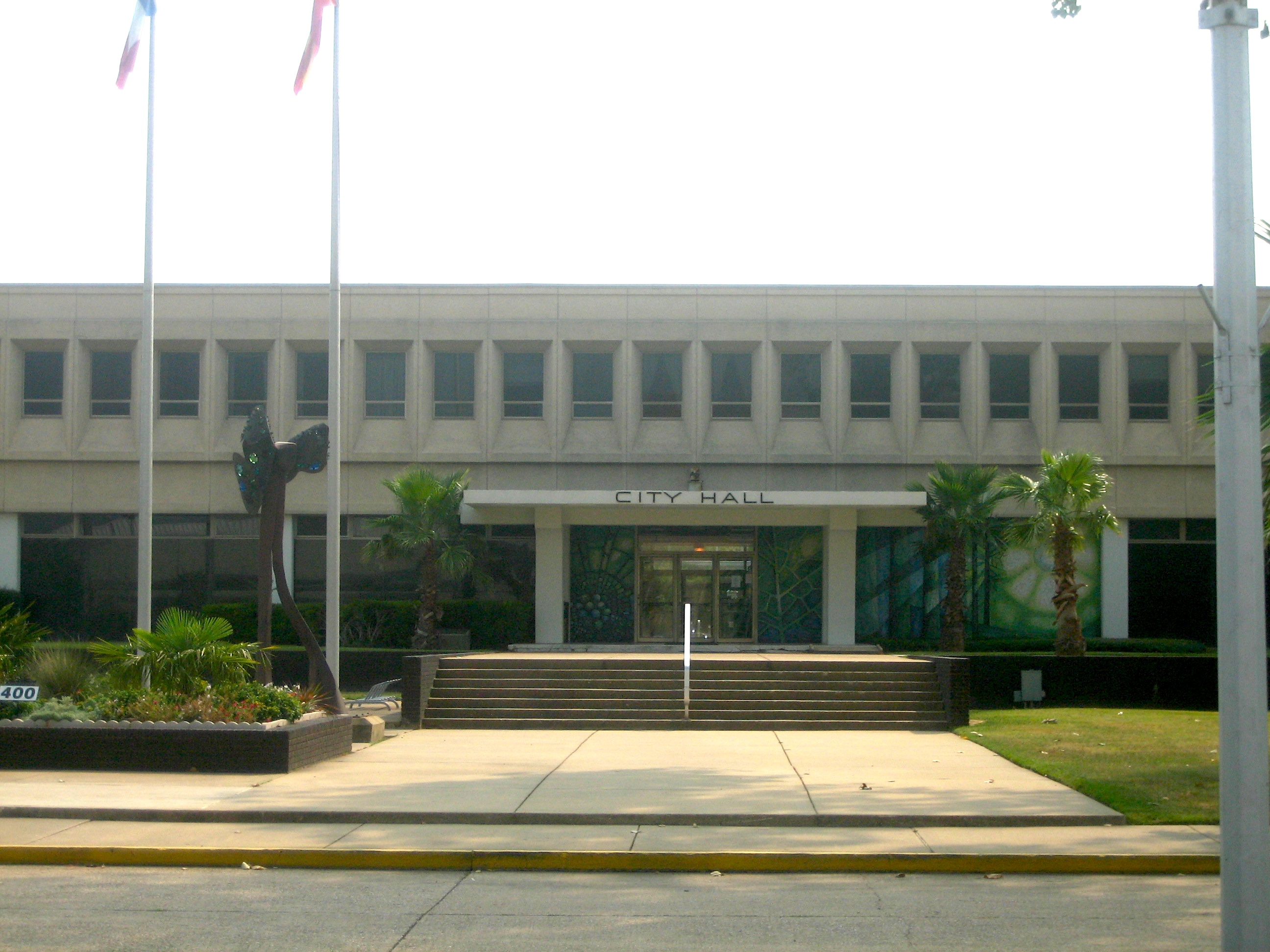
City hall building in Monroe, Louisiana (photo 2008)

- Arthur Hamilton Harris, 1855
- Joseph Forbes McGuire, 1856, 1868
- Robert James Caldwell, 1857, 1865
- James Gunn Richardson, 1858
- Christopher Hunt Dabbs, 1858
- Paul McEnery, 1859
- Bernard Bollenhagen Hemkin Jr., 1860-1861
- Robert Ray, 1861-1864
- Richard Daniel Blossman Jr., 1865
- George William McCranie, 1866-1867
- Jay Levin Hunsiker, 1869-1873
- George Byron Hamlet, 1873
- Frederick L. Endom, 1874-1882, 1886
- Lewis D. Allen Jr., 1884-1885
- Andrew Jackson Herring, 1888-1894, 1896-1898
- Thomas Young Aby, 1894-1895
- Andrew Alexander Forsythe, 1898-1914
- Charles A. Downey, 1914-1915
- Harvey Dewit Apgar, 1915-1918
- Arnold Bernstein, 1919-1937
- Harvey Herron Benoit, 1937-1948
- George Olan Breece, 1948-1949
- John Elton Coon, 1949-1956
- W. L. "Jack" Howard, 1956-1972, 1976-1978
- Ralph T. Troy, 1972-1976
- William Derwood Cann Jr., 1978-1979
- Robert E. "Bob" Powell, 1979-1996
- Abe E. Pierce, III, 1996-2000
- Melvin Rambin, 2000-2001
- Jamie Mayo, 2001-2020
- Friday Ellis, 2020–present

== See also ==
- Monroe history
