= William Derwood Cann Jr. =

American mayor, businessman, military officer

Mayor of Monroe, Ouachita Parish Louisiana, USA
- In office October 1978 – April 1979
- Preceded by: W. L. "Jack" Howard
- Succeeded by: Robert E. "Bob" Powell

Member of the Monroe City School Board
- In office 1968–1972

Personal details
- Born: September 12, 1919 Esperance Plantation; Ouachita Parish
- Died: July 12, 2010 (aged 90) Monroe, Louisiana
- Resting place: Mulhearn Memorial Park Cemetery in Monroe
- Party: Democratic
- Spouse: Arabella Bancroft Cann
- Children: Vada Montgomery Arabella Cann Dr. Thomas Nash
- Education: Ouachita Parish High School University of Louisiana at Monroe Louisiana State University
- Occupation: United States Army officer Businessman

Military service
- Branch/service: United States Army; United States Army Reserve
- Years of service: 1943–1956
- Rank: Lieutenant Colonel
- Unit: 101st Airborne Division
- Battles/wars: World War II: Normandy Campaign; Battle of the Bulge

William Derwood Cann Jr. (September 12, 1919 – July 12, 2010), was a World War II lieutenant colonel who subsequently became a college professor, manufacturing executive, and the interim mayor of Monroe in Ouachita Parish in northeastern Louisiana.

== Education and military ==
Cann was born on the Esperance Plantation near Monroe, one of five children of William Cann Sr. and the former Lodi DeSeay. He attended Ouachita Parish High School from 1933 to 1937. Thereafter he studied from 1937 to 1938 at the University of Louisiana at Monroe, then known as Ouachita Parish Junior College. In 1938, he enrolled at Louisiana State University in Baton Rouge, from which he received his bachelor's degree in 1942. At the age of seventeen, Cann joined the Louisiana Army National Guard, in which he became cadet captain.

Cann was commissioned a second lieutenant in the United States Army through the Reserve Officer Training Corps at LSU. From 1943 until 1945, he was a paratrooper, unit commander, and staff officer with the 101st Airborne Division in the European Theater of Operations, with participation at Normandy, the Battle of the Bulge, and other locations. In 1946, he became an aide de camp with the 82nd Airborne Division to Major General James M. Gavin, who was known for his unleashing of paratroopers during World War II. After the war, Cann served in many military capacities including the training of Turkish troops headed to the Korean War. He received many military commendations: the Bronze Star and Purple Heart medals, both with Oak leaf cluster, World War II Victory Medal, the Combat Infantryman Badge, the Army of Occupation of Germany Medal, and the Presidential Unit Citation. He retired from the Army in 1956.

== Business, political, and civic life ==
After his active military service, Cann was an officer in the U.S. Army Reserve. From 1954 to 1956, he was chairman of the Military Department at ULM, by then known as Northeast Louisiana State College. He was also an executive of Bancroft Bag, Inc., in West Monroe. At the time of his death, he was still a senior vice president, director, and shareholder of the company. From 1964 to 1972, Cann served on the Louisiana Board of Commerce and Industry under appointment from Governor John McKeithen. He served on the elected Monroe City School Board from 1968 to 1972. He was appointed mayor in October 1978 upon the resignation of W. L. "Jack" Howard, a co-founder of Howard Brothers Discount Stores, who had served five nonconsecutive terms in the position. Cann was mayor only until April 1979 and did not contest the special election, won by Robert E. "Bob" Powell, who held the position until his defeat seventeen years later in 1996 by Abe E. Pierce, III, the city's first African American mayor.

Cann was active in the Chamber of Commerce, the Public Affairs Research Council, Bayou DeSiard Country Club, March of Dimes, YMCA, American Red Cross, the United Way, and the Boy Scouts of America. In 1992, he served on the newspaper editorial board of the Monroe News-Star. In 1993, Cann was a Paul Harris Fellow of Rotary International.

== Death ==
Cann was a member of the vestry for three terms at Grace Episcopal Church of Monroe.

Cann died at the age of ninety at St. Francis Regional Medical Center in Monroe. He was survived by his wife, the former Arabella Bancroft; two daughters, Vada Montgomery and husband Eugene, and Arabella Cann, of Monroe; a son, Dr. Thomas Nash and wife Rebecca, of Baton Rouge, and three grandchildren. After services at Grace Church on July 15, 2010, he was interred at Mulhearn Memorial Park Cemetery in Monroe.

One of Cann's sisters, Lodi Cann Kysor (1922-2013), was from 1966 to 1973 a school board member in Ridgefield, Connecticut. She was elected board president in November 1970, the first woman in that role. Cann's time on the Monroe school board overlapped with that of his sister in Connecticut. Lodi Kysor died at the age of ninety-one in Richmond, Virginia, where she had relocated to be near her children.

== See also ==
- List of mayors of Monroe, Louisiana

Preceded by W. L. "Jack" Howard	Mayor of Monroe, Ouachita Parish, Louisiana; 1978–1979	Succeeded by Robert E. "Bob" Powell
