= Robert E. Powell =

American politician

Robert Ellis "Bob" Powell Sr.

Mayor of Monroe, Ouachita Parish Louisiana, USA
- In office April 1979 – July 1, 1996
- Preceded by: William Derwood Cann Jr.
- Succeeded by: Abe E. Pierce, III

Personal details
- Born: January 14, 1923
- Died: July 26, 1997 (aged 74)
- Resting place: Hasley Cemetery in West Monroe, Louisiana
- Party: Democratic
- Spouse: Nell Colson Powell
- Children: 3
- Occupation: Broadcaster

Robert Ellis "Bob" Powell Sr. (January 14, 1923 – July 26, 1997), was a Democrat who served for more than seventeen years as the mayor of Monroe in Ouachita Parish in northeastern Louisiana.

== Background ==
Powell and his wife, the former Nell Colson (July 30, 1925 – April 4, 2016), had two sons, Robert E. Powell Jr. (born February 1947), and William Gregory Powell (May 1, 1949 – August 29, 2019), and a daughter Elizabeth "Betty" Y. Powell (born May 1956), and three grandchildren (a fourth deceased).

A native of Union Parish, Mrs. Powell graduated in 1942 from Ouachita Parish High School and subsequently summa cum laude Phi Beta Kappa from the University of Louisiana at Monroe, then Northeast Louisiana University. She was an active member of First Presbyterian Church in Monroe, the Garden Club, and the Daughters of the American Revolution.

== Political career ==
Powell, who was the owner of KMLB-AM and KWEZ-FM radio stations, won a special election in April 1979 to succeed the interim mayor, William Derwood Cann Jr., a businessman and former World War II lieutenant colonel. Cann had been appointed to the position following the resignation in October 1978 of five-term Mayor W. L. "Jack" Howard, a Democrat who co-founded Howard Brothers Discount Stores. Powell then won full terms in 1980, 1984, 1988, and finally in 1992. In 1996, he was unseated by his former political ally, Abe E. Pierce, III, the president of the Ouachita Parish Police Jury and the first African American to fill the mayoralty in Monroe.

Between Christmas 1982 and New Year's Day 1983, Monroe and the surrounding area, including portions of Mississippi, Alabama, and Arkansas, was flooded with up to eighteen inches of rainfall. The situation was so critical that U.S. President Ronald W. Reagan came to Monroe on an hour-and-a-half inspection trip and promised immediate federal disaster funds. Mayor Powell said at the time that he had the "optimistic view that maybe we can survive it. But if we have bad weather, it could all come back."

Late in 1985, Powell and Police Chief Willie Buffington decided to present Monroe citizens with a "Christmas gift". The "expired" tags on city parking meters were covered with decorations and bows, and parking was free throughout the holiday season. The only enforcement for the holidays was prevention of parking in fire zones. The gesture drew national attention.

Powell's administration is remembered for economic growth, improvements to the municipal infrastructure, and reconciliation with the African-American community. In 1990, Powell formed an alliance with the African-American clergyman Roosevelt Wright of the New Tabernacle Baptist Church to establish the "African American Heritage Drama" presented each February during Black History Month. He was the first Monroe mayor to appoint blacks to important positions in municipal government, including public works director, prosecuting attorney, and chairman of the city Equal Employment Opportunity Commission.

In 1988, Powell was reelected with 77 percent of the vote over three other Democrats, one also named "Powell". In 1992, Powell turned back an attempt by Howard to regain the mayoralty. Based on primary returns, Howard could have entered into a runoff election with Powell but declined to do so. By 1996, Powell's support had collapsed. He finished in fourth place with 10 percent of the vote. Pierce then narrowly defeated a white Republican challenger, John Bryant, in the general election.

Consistent with his outreach to African Americans, Powell in 1990 was a donor to the committee to elect the African-American Marc Morial to Louisiana's 2nd congressional district seat, based about New Orleans. Morial lost the congressional race to succeed Lindy Boggs to William J. Jefferson, but he was later the mayor of New Orleans from 1994 to 2002. Powell also donated to the Louisiana Coalition against Racism and Nazism, formed to oppose David Duke, a Republican member of the Louisiana House of Representatives from 1989 to 1992, who ran unsuccessfully for the U.S. Senate in 1990 and for governor in 1991.

In July 1996, ten days after he left the mayor's office Powell joined successor Abe Pierce at the unveiling of a historical monument marking the location in Monroe of the first office building used by Delta Air Lines from 1928 until 1941. Originally a former gasoline station and garage, the building was abandoned in 1941. Pieces of two walls and some original bricks of the structure went moved to Atlanta, Georgia, for display at the Delta Air Lines Transport Heritage Museum there. On June 17, 1929, Delta began its first passenger service from Dallas, Texas, to Jackson, Mississippi via Shreveport and Monroe.

Powell died a year after his term as mayor ended. He is interred with an obelisk monument reading "Love Never Ends" at Hasley Cemetery in West Monroe.

Powell is not related to the Monroe comedian Robert Powell III, an African American who formerly worked for the office of the Monroe mayor and in a state government agency.

== See also ==
- List of mayors of Monroe, Louisiana

Preceded by William Derwood Cann Jr.	Mayor of Monroe, Ouachita Parish, Louisiana; 1979-1996	Succeeded by Abe E. Pierce III
Preceded by M. W. "Webb" Hart	President of the Louisiana Municipal Association; 1984–1985	Succeeded by Dennis K. Sumpter
