= Carroll High School (Monroe, Louisiana) =

Location
- 2939 Renwick St; Monroe, Ouachita Parish, Louisiana 71202; United States; 32.5154°N 92.0858°W

Information
- School board: Monroe City Schools
- Principal: Eric Davis
- Teaching staff: 47.07 (FTE)
- Grades: 9–12
- Enrollment: 627 (2023–2024)
- Student to teacher ratio: 13.32
- Colors: Blue and gold
- Team name: Bulldogs
- Website: www.mcschools.net/carroll-high-school

Carroll High School is a senior high school in Monroe, Louisiana, United States and a part of Monroe City Schools. It was preceded by Monroe Colored High School. Abe E. Pierce III and Joseph A. Johnson Jr. graduated from Monroe.

== Athletics ==
Carroll High athletics competes in the LHSAA.

In 2026, Carroll High School football teams was suspended after four games after a fight with Assumption High School.

=== Championships ===
Football championships

- (4) State Championships: 1953, 1961, 1962, 1968

== Notable alumni ==
- James "Shack" Harris, NFL player. The first black quarterback to start in an NFL season opening game.
