= Louisiana Purchase Gardens and Zoo =

Zoological park in Monroe, Louisiana

- Interactive map of Louisiana Purchase Gardens and Zoo
- 32.4663°N 92.0937°W
- Location: Monroe, Louisiana
- Land area: 80 acres (32 ha)
- No. of animals: 500
- Website: monroezoo.org

Louisiana Purchase Gardens and Zoo, located in Monroe, Louisiana, is an 80-acre (32 ha) zoological park that exhibits over 500 animals.

== Attractions and activities ==
There is a reptile house and a total of roughly 500 animals at the zoo, including addax, agile wallaby, alligator snapping turtle, American alligator, American black bear, American flamingo, bald eagle, black swan, black-necked swan, black-tailed prairie dog, Burchell's zebra, Cape buffalo, dromedary camel, Egyptian geese, elk, emu, hippopotamus, lion, nine-banded armadillo, ostrich, red kangaroo, spotted hyena, tiger, western hoolock gibbon, white-tailed deer and several other animals.

There is also a boat tour that allows visitors to see species that are not visible from the foot paths, including hoofed animals, primates, and species native to the area. The zoo holds various seasonal festivities that include the Easter Egg Extravaganza, Boo at the Zoo, and Splash into Summer.

== History ==
The original name of the Louisiana Purchase Gardens Zoo was Bernstein Park Zoo, named after Mayor Arnold Bernstein who was Mayor of Monroe in 1919 until his death in 1937.

Much of the development of the zoo came during the long-term administration of Mayor W. L. "Jack" Howard who made the facility a centerpiece of his campaign for municipal improvements, along with such projects as a new City Hall and Civic Center.

In 2013, the United States Department of Agriculture, which holds regulatory authority over the nation's zoos, mandated that the zoo remodel the kitchen where the food for the animals is prepared and construct eight new holding pens for primates. Zoo director Joe Clawson said that he expected to tap into the $80,000 annual maintenance budget to make the needed changes in-house.

As of 2017 the zoo was in full compliance with the United States Department of Agriculture. In June the zoo acquired a new male lion and remodeled the lion exhibit. The zoo is also in the process of buying a new train for the visitors.
