= Wossman High School =

Location
- 1600 Arizona Ave; Monroe, Ouachita Parish, Louisiana 71220; United States; 32.4899°N 92.0863°W

Information
- Opened: 1967 (59 years ago)
- Principal: Harrington Watson, III
- Teaching staff: 49.26 (FTE)
- Grades: 9-12
- Enrollment: 666 (2023–2024)
- Student to teacher ratio: 13.52
- Mascot: Wildcat
- Website: www.mcschools.net/wossman-high-school

Wossman High School is a senior high school in Monroe, Louisiana, and a part of Monroe City Schools.

== Athletics ==
Wossman High athletics competes in the LHSAA.

=== Championships ===
Football Championships

- (1) State Championship: 1986

Baseball

- (1) State Championship: 1977

Basketball

- Boys: 2008, 2024
- Girls: 2022, 2023, 2024

== Notable alumni ==
Pat Moore - Current member of the Louisiana House of Representatives, District 17. Former member of the Ouachita Parish Police Jury.
