= William Lorenzo Howard =

American politician

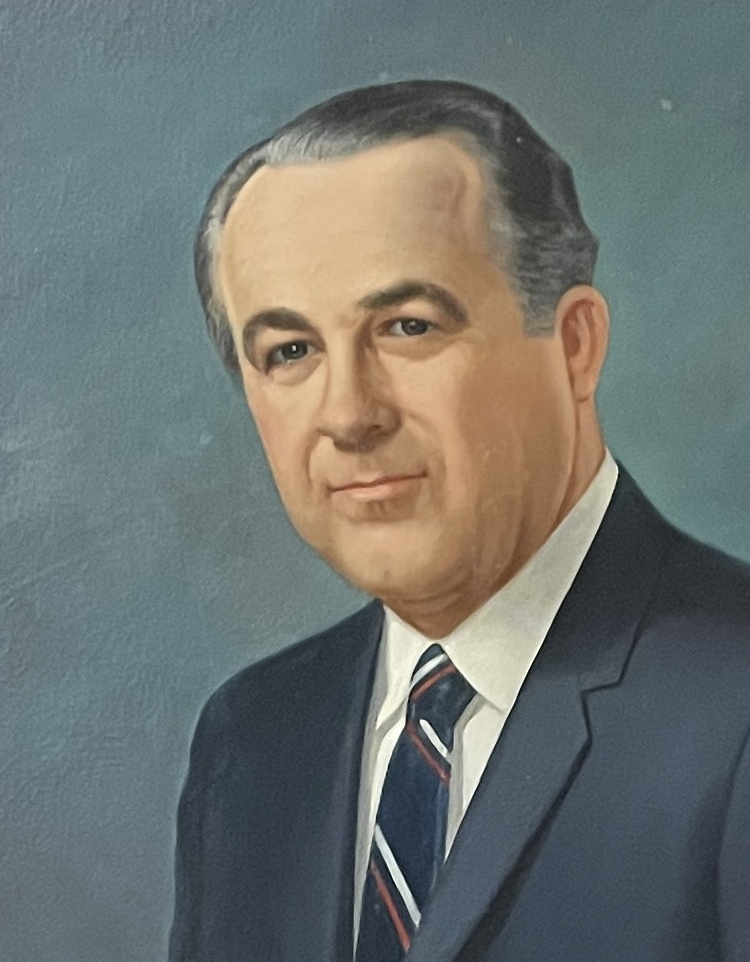

36th and 38th Mayor of Monroe, Louisiana
- In office 1956–1972
- Preceded by: John Elton Coon
- Succeeded by: Ralph T. Troy
- In office 1976–1978
- Preceded by: Ralph T. Troy
- Succeeded by: William Derwood Cann Jr.

Personal details
- Born: April 23, 1921 Union Parish, Louisiana, U.S.
- Died: November 11, 2004 (aged 83) Monroe, Louisiana, U.S.
- Resting place: Mulhearn Memorial Park Cemetery in Monroe
- Party: Democratic
- Spouse: LaRue Jones Howard
- Children: 3
- Relatives: V. E. Howard (brother); Alton Hardy Howard (brother); Korie Robertson (great-niece)
- Occupation: Businessman

Military service
- Branch/service: United States Navy
- Battles/wars: World War II

William Lorenzo Howard, known as W. L. "Jack" Howard (April 23, 1921 – November 11, 2004), was a five-term Democratic mayor of Monroe, Louisiana, who served from 1956 to 1972 and again from 1976 to 1978. He was a partner in the former Howard Brothers Discount Stores, which at their peak had eighty-seven outlets throughout the American South.

== Background ==
Howard was the fifth of seven children born in the Rocky Branch community near Farmerville in Union Parish in North Louisiana, to a Church of Christ couple, Elisha John "Hardy" Howard and the former Corrine Smith. An older brother, Verna Elisha Howard, was a radio minister for more than four decades who in Texarkana, Texas, founded the International Gospel Hour. A younger brother, Alton Hardy Howard of West Monroe, was his business partner. Still another younger brother, Kelton Leroy Howard (1928-1994), died exactly two weeks after Howard's own passing.

Howard served in the United States Navy during World War II. Prior to his election as mayor at the age of thirty-five, he had been a president of the Louisiana Jaycees and a vice-president of the national organization. He and his brother Alton operated Howard Brothers Jewelers in Monroe and in 1959 launched the first Howard Brothers general merchandise outlet in West Monroe. Thereafter, the pair obtained the first Gibson franchise, the forerunner to the Howard Brothers discount chain stores. The brothers also had a Super Saver Wholesale Warehouse Club, but in time they could not compete with Sam Walton's much larger Wal-Mart and Sam's Club, which opened stores in much smaller cities.

Howard was heavily involved in activities of the Forsythe Avenue Church of Christ in Monroe. He was the chairman of the board of the Church of Christ-affiliated Harding University, then Harding College in Searcy in White County, Arkansas. He worked to develop the Ouachita Christian High School located at 7065 U.S. Highway 165 North in Monroe.

== Political career ==
=== City of Monroe ===
As mayor, Howard threw himself into the tasks of municipal management. He pushed for development of the downtown Monroe Civic Center complex, easily accessible from Interstate 20. The complex includes the 2,200-seat W. L. Jack Howard Theatre, renamed in his honor in 2004. Among many events, the theater hosts the annual Miss Louisiana pageant the last week of June. Howard was the driving force for a new City Hall and the expansion of the Louisiana Purchase Gardens and Zoo into a major statewide attraction. Howard pushed for construction of Malone Stadium, home of the Warhawks football team at the University of Louisiana at Monroe. The previous stadium could hold just over 8,000; Malone, with subsequent expansion, nearly 31,000. Attendance at the games by those from rural areas and small towns served too as an economic boost to Monroe-area merchants and promoted regional unity. Howard enacted massive street-paving and flood-prevention programs and expanded the fire and police departments. The city also purchased a riverboat during his tenure.

Howard was an original opponent of school desegregation compelled by the federal courts. Howard became an informal advisor to his sister mayor, Bert Hatten of West Monroe, a newspaper managing editor and publisher. Howard and Hatten complemented the strengths of each of their cities.

In 1972, Howard was unseated in the then closed primary by fellow Democrat Ralph T. Troy, a mortgage banker. In 1975, while out of office, Howard was convicted of having used municipal employees for personal benefit; Howard pleaded guilty to one felony count and one misdemeanor count and was then pardoned by Governor Edwin Edwards.

Troy did not seek a second term as mayor, and Howard returned to office in 1976. Unable to work with the two other city commissioners, Howard resigned as mayor in October 1978. He was succeeded by the interim mayor, William Derwood Cann Jr., a businessman and a highly decorated lieutenant colonel in World War II.

Beset with flooding and a police strike, Conn did not seek the office in the special election which followed, and in April 1979, Democrat Robert E. "Bob" Powell was elected mayor and served for seventeen years until 1996.

In 1992, two years before his death, Howard, still a Democrat, sought to unseat Powell; when he fell short with 36 percent of the vote in the first round of the nonpartisan blanket primary, Howard withdrew from the runoff election to which he was entitled, and Powell won his last term in the position.

=== Presidential politics ===
In the 1960s, Howard was a statewide figure in presidential politics. In 1964, he strayed from his Democratic Party to support the Republican presidential nominee, U.S. Senator Barry M. Goldwater of Arizona, who won the state's ten electoral votes but carried only six states nationally. Howard was among the Democratic defectors, which also included Lieutenant Governor C. C. "Taddy" Aycock and Louisiana Secretary of State Wade O. Martin Jr., who attended a Goldwater rally at Tulane University Stadium in New Orleans. There Goldwater appeared with his senatorial ally, Democrat-turned-Republican Senator Strom Thurmond, who had won Louisiana's then ten electoral votes in 1948. Republican congressional candidate David C. Treen, later his state's first ever GOP congressman and governor, was the master of ceremonies.

In mid-December 1966, Howard sought the chairmanship of the Louisiana Democratic Party after the resignation of C. H. "Sammy" Downs, a former state legislator from Alexandria and an aide to Governor John McKeithen. Despite the support of both Downs and political boss Leander Perez of Plaquemines Parish, Howard lost the race by a vote of fifty-four to thirty-eight, to Edward M. Carmouche, an attorney from Lake Charles and a supporter of U.S. President Lyndon B. Johnson, who was then still expected to seek a second full term in 1968. Ultimately, Downs, Howard, and Perez all supported the challenge waged in 1968 by George C. Wallace, the former governor of Alabama, who ran as the American Independent Party nominee.

=== Racial politics ===
The formerly segregationist Monroe city leadership had discouraged Martin Luther King Jr., from bringing his civil rights campaign to Monroe, After the failure of the Goldwater and Wallace candidacies, Mayor Howard consulted with African American leaders in the city to develop plans to prevent civil unrest at a time during the 1960s when racial riots had struck a number of cities ranging from New York City to Los Angeles. Abe E. Pierce, III (born 1934), the first black mayor of Monroe who was elected in 1996 to a single term, recalls how Howard told business that the city had to desegregate to remove reasons for black unrest and to move ahead economically for both races. The mayor's position is now held by Independent Friday Ellis, who unseated incumbent Jamie Mayo in 2021. Mayo, a native of Mer Rouge in Morehouse Parish, who was victorious in a special election in 2001 and won the first of thus far three consecutive full terms in 2004. He is the second African American in the mayoralty.

== Death and legacy ==
Howard died in Monroe at the age of eighty-three.

In addition to the W. L. Jack Howard Theatre, he is commemorated through the W. L. and LaRue Howard Religious Missionary and Educational Foundation at 207 Maison Drive in Monroe.

In 2022, Howard was posthumously inducted into the Louisiana Political Museum and Hall of Fame, based in Winnfield.

== See also ==
- List of mayors of Monroe, Louisiana

Preceded by John Elton Coon	Mayor of Monroe, Ouachita Parish, Louisiana; 1956-1972	Succeeded by Ralph T. Troy
Preceded by Ralph T. Troy	Mayor of Monroe, Ouachita Parish, Louisiana; 1976-1978	Succeeded by William Derwood Cann Jr.
