= Don Wilson (baseball) =

American baseball player (1945–1975)

- Wilson with the Houston Astros during the 1971 MLB All-Star Game
- Pitcher
- Born: February 12, 1945; Monroe, Louisiana, U.S.
- Died: January 5, 1975 (aged 29); Houston, Texas, U.S.
- Batted: Right Threw: Right

MLB debut
- September 29, 1966, for the Houston Astros

Last MLB appearance
- September 28, 1974, for the Houston Astros

MLB statistics
- Win–loss record: 104–92
- Earned run average: 3.15
- Strikeouts: 1,283
- Stats at Baseball Reference

Teams
- Houston Astros (1966–1974)

Career highlights and awards
- All-Star (1971); Pitched two no-hitters (1967, 1969); Houston Astros No. 40 retired; Houston Astros Hall of Fame

Donald Edward Wilson (February 12, 1945 – January 5, 1975) was an American professional baseball pitcher. He played all or part of nine seasons in Major League Baseball with the Houston Astros.

== Biography ==
=== Career ===
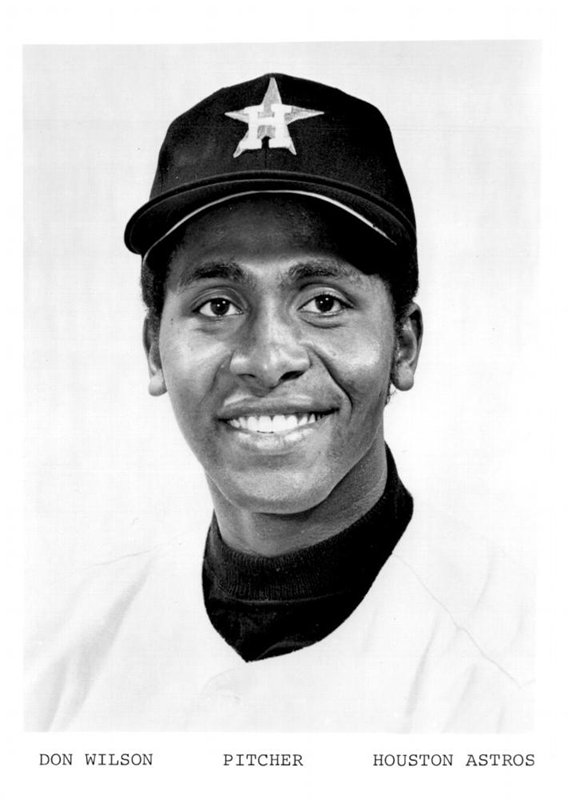
1969 publicity photo of Wilson for the Houston Astros

Wilson attended Centennial High School and his professional career began after he graduated from Compton Community College in Compton, California, and was recruited by the Astros in 1966. Early in his career he was prone to wildness, but Wilson was also known as one of the hardest throwers in the National League. Wilson debuted as a September call-up on the 29th against the Cincinnati Reds. He went six innings while striking out seven while allowing two runs in a 3-2 win.

1967 was his first full year with the Astros. He pitched in 31 games while starting 28 of them. He went 10-9 with a 2.79 ERA in 184 innings while dealing with 69 walks, 159 strikeouts, and ten wild pitches. On June 18, Wilson no-hit the Atlanta Braves 2–0 at the Astrodome. The no-hitter was the first ever pitched either in a domed stadium or on artificial turf. Along the way, he struck out 15 batters, including Hank Aaron for the final out.(Audio) The following season Wilson went 13-16 with a 3.28 ERA in 33 games (30 starts) and 208.2 innings, having 175 strikeouts and 70 walks.

In the second game of a doubleheader against the Cincinnati Reds at Crosley Field on July 14, Wilson set the Astros club record for single-game strikeouts with 18 as the Astros won 6-1.

He took an upswing with the 1969 season. He started the 1969 season as the Opening Day pitcher, the eighth different opening day pitcher for the Astros in their first eight seasons. Facing the expansion team San Diego Padres, Wilson pitched six innings and allowed two runs on three hits (one home run) with four strikeouts and one walk in a 2-1 loss. He went 16-12 with a 4.00 ERA in 34 starts and 225 innings while walking 97 batters and striking out 235 (a career high). He led the league in wild pitches with 16 while being second in strikeouts per nine innings with 9.400. On May 1, the day after the Reds' Jim Maloney no-hit the Astros 10–0 at Crosley Field for his second career no-hitter, Wilson returned the favor and no-hit the Reds 4–0 for his second career no-hitter. (Audio) The back-to-back no-hit feat was only the second in MLB history, the first having been accomplished in September of just the year before by Gaylord Perry and Ray Washburn. This second no-hitter was vengeance for Wilson: in his previous start against the Reds nine days earlier, he had given up seven runs in five innings and was the losing pitcher in the Reds' 14–0 drubbing of the Astros at the Astrodome. That year, the Astros finished .500 (81-81) for the first time in club history, That season, the Astros set what was then a big-league record for strikeouts in a season by a pitching staff. Two other Houston starters, Larry Dierker (232) and Tom Griffin (200), also struck out at least 200 batters that season, with Wilson having the most of the group. This was only the second time in MLB history that a team had three pitchers with 200 strikeouts.

The following year continued some of his upswing. He went 11-6 with a 3.91 ERA in 29 games (27 starts) in 184.1 innings, striking out 94 while walking 66.

1971, however, was his best season. He would have a career-best ERA of 2.45 and a 16-10 record in 35 games (34 starts) as he had career-high 18 complete games and 268 innings pitched while striking out 180 batters and walking 79 (facing over a thousand batters for the first and only time in his career) while leading the league in hits per nine innings with 6.5. He was selected to the All-Star Game for the first and only time in his career. as well as earn Astros MVP honors. Wilson pitched the seventh and eighth inning of the game, walking one and striking out two.

He was the Opening Day starter for 1972, the second Astros pitcher to have had multiple starts in the first game after Dierker. He went 7.1 innings against the San Francisco Giants in a losing effort, giving up four runs on seven hits (two home runs) in a 5-0 loss. He went 15-10 that year, having a 2.68 ERA (the third and last sub 3.00 ERA of his career) while pitching in 33 games (all starts) and throwing 13 complete games in 228.1 innings, striking out 172 batters and walking 66 (tied for his lowest in a full season of work). He reached 1,000 career strikeouts on September 11, doing so with his first of three strikeouts against the Los Angeles Dodgers, doing so against Willie Crawford. He declined in the following year, going 11-16 with a 3.20 ERA in 37 games (32 starts) and 239.1 innings pitched while striking out 149 and walking 92.

In what became his last season, he had a middling year. He went 11-13 with a 3.08 ERA in 33 games (27 starts) in 204.2 innings, striking out 112 batters and walking 100 (a career high). He won his 100th game as a pitcher on July 30, doing so against the Cincinnati Reds at Riverfront Stadium. He pitched eight innings while allowing four runs on five hits (two home runs) while striking out nine and walking four as the Astros won 8-4. Wilson's last game was a two-hit, 5–0 shutout against the Atlanta Braves on September 28, 1974.

== Death ==
Plate honoring Don Wilson on the Houston Astros Wall of Honor at Daikin Park

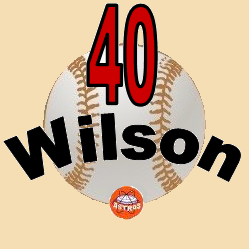
Don Wilson's number 40 was retired by the Houston Astros in 1975.

On January 5, 1975, Wilson died at the house he shared with his wife, daughter, and son in Houston's Fondren Southwest community. Wilson's wife, Bernice, found him in the passenger seat of his Ford Thunderbird, parked inside the garage, with the engine running. The garage was attached to the house, and the carbon monoxide gas fatally asphyxiated his son, Donald "Alex" Alexander (aged 5), who was sleeping in the master bedroom above the garage. Wilson's daughter Denise (aged 9), was found unconscious in another bedroom and hospitalized. Bernice was treated for carbon monoxide gas inhalation and for a jaw injury that she could not remember incurring. On February 5, 1975, Dr. Joseph Jachimczyk, the Harris County medical examiner, ruled the deaths of Don and Alex Wilson accidental. Dr. Jachimczyk's autopsy report showed that Wilson had a blood alcohol content of 0.167%. One theory is that Wilson drove into his garage, activated the automatic garage door opener to close, and then passed out.

Wilson's uniform number was retired by the Astros on April 13, 1975, and a black circular patch with his number 40 in white was worn on the left sleeve of the Astros "rainbow jerseys" the following season.

== See also ==
- Houston Astros award winners and league leaders
- List of Houston Astros no-hitters
- List of baseball players who died during their careers
- List of Major League Baseball single-game strikeout leaders
- List of Major League Baseball no-hitters
- List of people from Monroe, Louisiana

Awards and achievements
| Preceded by Sonny Siebert; Jim Maloney | No-hitter pitcher June 18, 1967; May 1, 1969 | Succeeded by Dean Chance; Jim Palmer |
