= Monroe City Schools =

School district in Louisiana, United States

City of Monroe School District

Address
- 2006 Tower Drive Monroe, Ouachita Parish, Louisiana, 71201; United States
- Coordinates: 32.5251°N 92.1077°W

District information
- Type: public local school district
- Grades: PK-12
- Schools: 19
- NCES District ID: 2201080

Students and staff
- Students: 8,033 (2024-2025)
- Teachers: 636.61 (2024-2025)
- Student–teacher ratio: 12.62(2024-2025)

Other information
- Website: Monroe City Schools

Monroe City Schools is a school district that is coterminous with the city limits of Monroe, Louisiana, United States.

William Derwood Cann, Jr., later the interim mayor of Monroe from 1978 to 1979, served on the Monroe school board from 1968 to 1972

== Schools ==
=== High schools ===
- Carroll High School (Bulldogs)
- Neville High School (Tigers)
- Wossman High School (Wildcats)

=== Junior high schools ===
6-8

- Martin Luther King Jr., Middle School
- Excellence Academy Charter School

7-8

- Carroll Junior High School
- Neville Junior High School

=== Elementary schools ===
PK-6

- Carver Elementary School
- J. S. Clark Magnet Elementary School
- Cypress Point Elementary School
- Barkdull Faulk Elementary School
- Madison James Foster Elementary School
- Sallie Humble Elementary School
- Lexington Elementary School
- Lincoln Elementary School

PK-5

- Berg Jones Elementary School
- Minnie Ruffin Elementary School

3-5

- Jefferson Upper Elementary School

PK-2

- Clara Hall Elementary School
- Lexington Elementary School
