= John Elton Coon =

American politician (1907–1993)

Mayor of Monroe, Ouachita Parish, Louisiana, US
- In office 1949–1956
- Preceded by: George Olan Breece
- Succeeded by: W. L. "Jack" Howard

Louisiana State Representative from Ouachita Parish
- In office 1948–1949
- Preceded by: At-large delegation: D. Ross Banister (resigned 1946; not replaced) Chancey Clyde Bell, Sr. (died 1946; not replaced)
- Succeeded by: R. C. White

Personal details
- Born: August 10, 1907 Ouachita Parish, Louisiana, US
- Died: March 9, 1993 (aged 85) Monroe, Louisiana, US
- Resting place: Mulhearn Memorial Park Cemetery in Monroe
- Party: Democratic
- Spouse(s): (1) Lera Whitten Coon (2) Mattie Rose Ferguson Barnett Downs Coon
- Children: 1
- Education: Louisiana State University
- Occupation: Public official

John Elton Coon (August 10, 1907 – March 9, 1993) was a Democratic politician from Monroe, Louisiana, who served from 1948 to 1949 in the Louisiana House of Representatives and from 1949 to 1956 as the mayor of Monroe.

Coon resigned after less than two years in the state House to become mayor of Monroe upon the death at the age of thirty-seven of his predecessor, George Olan Breece (October 21, 1912 – November 6, 1949), a native of Kanawha, West Virginia. Coon then won a full term as mayor in 1952 and was succeeded in 1956 by fellow Democrat W. L. "Jack" Howard, who served for five nonconsecutive terms in the office between 1956 and 1978. After his mayoral tenure, Coon was from 1956 to 1964 the Louisiana state fire marshal under Governors Earl Kemp Long and Jimmie Davis.

Coon was the youngest child of the former Henrietta Henson (1865–1947) and Jacob Allen Coon (1858–1919) of the Okaloosa Community in Ouachita Parish. Coon's father died before Coon was a teenager. His sister and last surviving sibling was Eunice Coon Williamson (1891–1991), an English and foreign languages faculty member from 1928 to 1958 at Louisiana Tech University in Ruston. Coon's first wife, the former Lera Whitten (1907–1980), was a 40-year teacher at Ouachita Parish High School; after her death, he wed the widowed Mattie Rose Ferguson Barnett Downs (1910–1998). Coon had a stepson, the late John Harden Barnett Downs, a five-term at-large member of the Alexandria City Council for whom the Johnny Downs Sports Complex in Alexandria is named. Johnny Downs' adopted father and Mattie Coon's previous husband was Malcolm Calvin Downs (1907–1953).

Coon graduated in 1929 from Tulane University in New Orleans. He was a member of First Families of Mississippi, the Masonic lodge, and the Shriners. Coon was an honorary lifetime member of the Louisiana Firemen's Association and the International Chiefs of Police. He received the "Silver Medal of Good Citizenship" from the Sons of the American Revolution. He was a member of the First United Methodist Church of Monroe.

Coon died in Monroe at the age of eighty-five.

== See also ==
- List of mayors of Monroe, Louisiana

Preceded by At-large members: D. Ross Banister (resigned 1946; not replaced) Chancey Clyde Bell, Sr. (died 1946; not replaced)	Louisiana State Representative from Ouachita Parish; John Elton Coon; 1948-1949	Succeeded by R. C. White
Preceded by George O. Breece	Mayor of Monroe, Louisiana; John Elton Coon; 1949-1956	Succeeded by W. L. "Jack" Howard
