= Joseph S. Cage Jr. =

American lawyer and soldier (1942–2019)

United States Attorney for the Western District of Louisiana
- In office 1982–1993
- President: Ronald Reagan; George H. W. Bush
- Preceded by: J. Ransdell Keene
- Succeeded by: Michael D. Skinner

Personal details
- Born: Joseph Shelby Cage, Jr. February 28, 1942 Monroe, Louisiana
- Died: December 25, 2019 (aged 77) Shreveport, Louisiana
- Spouse: Susan Sperry Cage (married 1968)
- Children: 3
- Education: Neville High School
- Alma mater: Louisiana Tech(left due to military service); University of Louisiana Monroe (1969) (Bachelor); University of Houston (1972) (JD)

Military service
- Allegiance: United States
- Branch/service: United States Marine Corps

Joseph Shelby Cage Jr. (1942–2019) was an American lawyer and former American soldier from Louisiana. He served as United States Attorney for the Western District of Louisiana under two presidents.

== Early life ==
Joseph Shelby Cage, Jr, was born on February 28, 1942, in Monroe, Louisiana to Shelby and Virginia Cage. Joe graduated from Neville High School in Monroe where he excelled in sports and set state and national records. In 1960, he was named Ark-La-Tex Athlete of the Year and was later inducted into the Louisiana State Track and Field Association Hall of Fame. Upon graduation he attended Louisiana Tech on a track scholarship and later served in the United States Marine Corp. Following his service, he completed his education at ULM in Monroe, in 1968 the same year he married his wife Susan.

== Legal career ==
After getting married Joseph and Susan moved to Houston, where Joe would attend and eventually graduate from the University of Houston, Bates College of Law.

His impressive and extensive law career began when he joined the Criminal Section of the United States Attorney's office in New Orleans. He then entered private practice in Monroe and thereafter became an assistant US Attorney in Shreveport. In 1982, he was honored with the appointment as United States Attorney for the Western District of Louisiana by President Ronald Reagan for whom he served two terms. He was then reappointed by President George H. W. Bush for another term. He was chosen to serve as Commissioner for the Louisiana State Police and served in that position for 18 years. He retired from the practice of law in 2003 after ten years as a member of the defense team of the Capital Assistance Project of Louisiana.
