= Justin Ellis =

Justin Ellis may refer to:

- Justin Ellis (American football) (born 1990), American professional football nose tackle
- Justin Ellis (soccer) (born 2007), American professional soccer player
