= Alex Carroll =

Canadian football player (born 1992)

No. 88
- Position: Wide receiver

Personal information
- Born: March 18, 1992 (age 34); Victoria, British Columbia, Canada
- Listed height: 5 ft 11 in (1.80 m)
- Listed weight: 195 lb (88 kg)

Career information
- High school: Mount Douglas SS
- University: Queen's Golden Gaels

Career history
- 2015: Saskatchewan Roughriders
- 2017: Montreal Alouettes
- Stats at CFL.ca

Alex Carroll (born March 18, 1992) is a Canadian former professional football wide receiver. He played for the Saskatchewan Roughriders of the Canadian Football League in 2015 and later was a member of the Montreal Alouettes in 2017. He previously attended Queen's University where he played college football for the Golden Gaels and studied political science.

== Early career ==
Carroll played high school football at Mount Douglas Secondary School. He played for the Queen's Golden Gaels from 2010 to 2014, where he was a receiver, kickoff returner, and punt returner. In 2012, Carroll suffered a severe knee injury in a playoff game against the Guelph Gryphons, tearing his anterior cruciate ligament (ACL), lateral meniscus, and medial meniscus. The injury required reconstructive surgery. Carroll was eligible for the 2014 CFL draft, but was not selected. He subsequently returned to the Gaels for his fifth year of eligibility in 2014, playing in eight games. He finished his final year with 52 receptions for 875 yards and eight touchdowns. Carroll was named a first-team all-star at wide receiver and second-team all-star at kick and punt returner within the Ontario University Athletics (OUA) regional athletics organization.

== Professional career ==
Following his performance during his final season with the Gaels, Carroll was invited to the regional CFL Combine in Edmonton and a mini-camp with the Saskatchewan Roughriders. The Roughriders signed Carroll in late April as an undrafted free agent. He was placed on the practice roster following the preseason. Carroll made his CFL debut against the BC Lions on July 10, playing mostly on the special teams. On August 22, he made his first start as a receiver against the Calgary Stampeders, catching his first CFL pass for 15 yards and a touchdown. He was released by the Roughriders on May 13, 2016.

Carroll signed with the Montreal Alouettes in 2017, but suffered an injury that made him miss the season.

== Later life ==
After his football career, Carroll worked for the real estate business Engel & Völkers.
