= Neville High School =

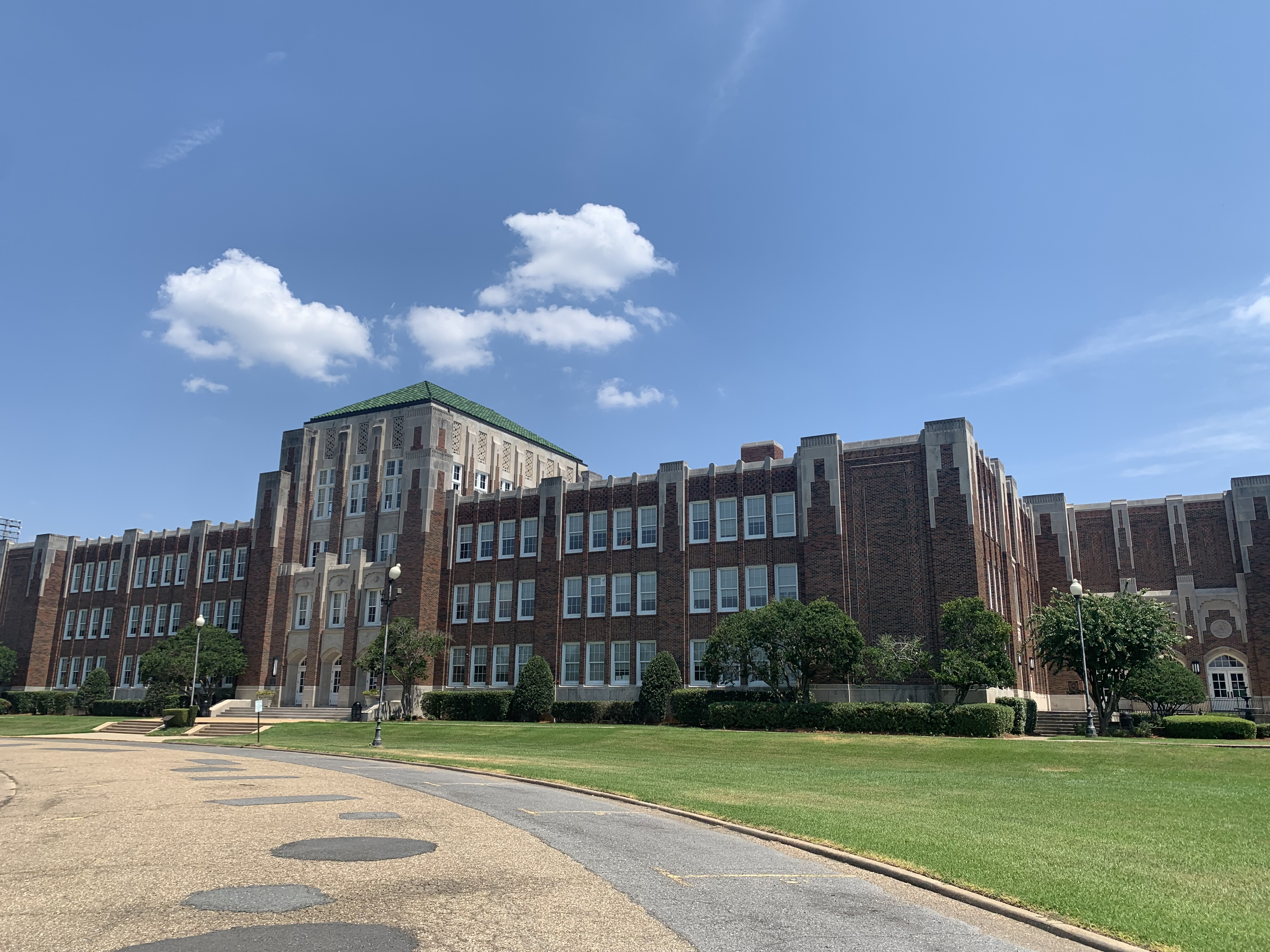
- Neville High School, 2023

Location
- 600 Forsythe Avenue; Monroe, (Ouachita Parish), Louisiana 71201; United States; 32°31′20″N 92°7′35″W

Information
- Type: Public
- Motto: Win Today!
- Established: 1931
- Founder: Ernest Long Neville
- School board: Monroe City School Board
- School district: Monroe City Schools
- Principal: Karari Hanks
- Teaching staff: 71.35 (FTE)
- Grades: 9–12
- Age range: 14-18
- Average class size: 20
- Student to teacher ratio: 14.60
- Language: English
- Hours in school day: 8
- Classrooms: 400-500
- Campus: Mid-Town/Garden District
- Campus size: 2 to 3 blocks
- Campus type: Small
- Colors: Black and Gold
- Slogan: Excellence in All Things
- Fight song: Tiger Rag; Alma mater: "O' Neville High"
- Athletics: Football, Baseball, Softball, Basketball, Soccer, Swimming, Golf, Tennis, Track & Field, Cross Country
- Athletics conference: LHSAA District 2–5A
- Mascot: Tiger
- Nickname: Tigers
- Rival: Ruston High School, West Monroe High School, West Ouachita High School, Ouachita Parish High School
- Publication: Tiger Talk, Neville Matters
- Newspaper: The Neville Tradition
- Yearbook: The Monroyan
- Website: mcschools.net/neville-high-school

Neville High School is a high school in Monroe, Louisiana, United States. It is administered by the Monroe City Schools Board. It is located 1/2 mile from the Ouachita River. Its mascot is the Tiger.

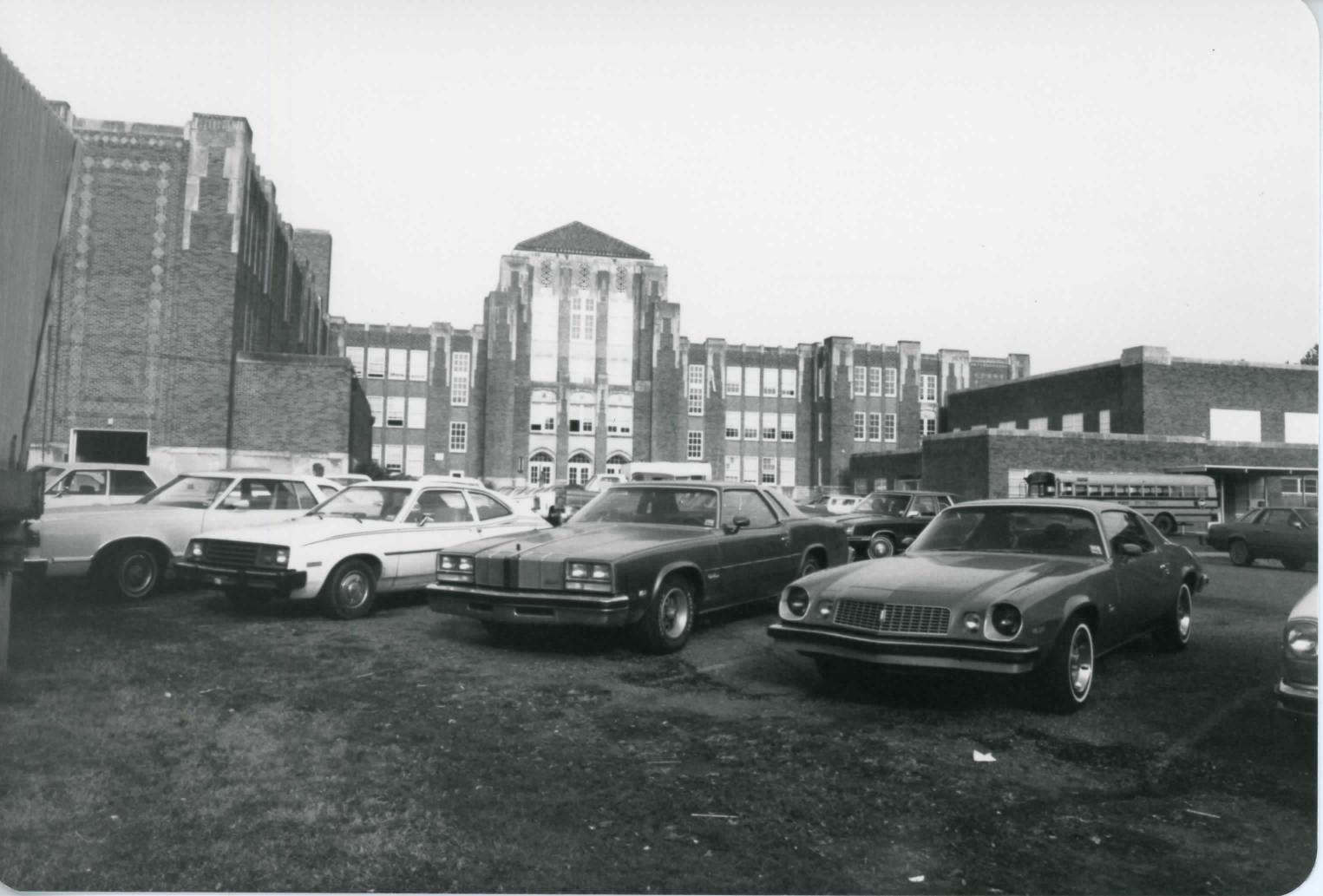
Neville High School, 1984

== Academics ==
Neville offers a wide variety of academics, on and off campus. Neville has a Technology department, English department, Foreign Language department, Health department, Journalism department, Math department, Naval Science department, Science department, Social Studies department, and Special Service department.

== Athletics ==
Neville High athletics competes in the LHSAA.

=== Football ===
The Neville Tigers play football at Bill Ruple Stadium in Monroe, Louisiana and are coached by Head Coach Mike Collins.

Neville has won 12 state championships (1955, 1959, 1961, 1962, 1972, 1983, 1984, 1995, 2009, 2011, 2014, 2015) and have been state runners-up six times (1958, 1982, 1991, 1992, 2012, 2016). The Tigers have claimed a district championship 29 times. Neville has made a football playoff appearance 53 times. The Tigers have not missed the playoffs since 1999. The Tigers have had 6 perfect seasons in its football history (1959, 1961, 1962, 1983, 2011, 2015). From 2014 to 2016, the Neville Tigers won 39 straight football games, marking it the 7th best streak in LHSAA history.

In 2002, Robert Lane was named Louisiana High School Gatorade Player of the Year, making him the only Tiger to ever receive this honor. Both Robert Lane (2002) and John Diarse (2012) were named LSWA Mr. Football for Louisiana. Diarse was also named a Parade All-American and a U.S. Army All-American.

Coaches

- Charlie Brown - LHSAA Hall of Fame Head Coach, Charlie Brown, coached 30 years for the Neville Tigers and compiled a 262–66–5 record with a .790 winning percentage. Coach Brown led the Tigers to eleven district championships and three state championships along with two state runners-up.
- Jimmy Childress - LHSAA Hall of Fame Head Coach, Jimmy Childress, was an assistant football coach at Neville from 1958 to 1972 and helped to deliver four state championships.
- Mickey McCarty - Coach McCarty, coached 18 years at Neville and compiled a 197–43 record with a .820 winning percentage. He led the Tigers to eleven district championships and four state championships along with two state runners-up.

=== Baseball ===
The Neville Tigers baseball team play their home games at Embanato Field. The team have won 7 state championships in 10 appearances (1952, 1953, 1954, 1955, 1958, 1961, 1962, 1993, 2012, 2017)

== Accolades ==
In September 2017 Neville High School was recognized as the most beautiful high school in the state of Louisiana by Architectural Digest. Architectural Digest listed the most beautiful high school in each state of the United States.

== Notable alumni ==
- Larry Anderson, former NFL cornerback
- Brian Bateman (Class of 1991), former PGA Tour Player, winner of 2007 Buick Open
- Bubby Brister, former NFL quarterback
- Tom Brown, former MLB pitcher
- Joseph S. Cage Jr., former US Attorney for the Western District of Louisiana
- Will Campbell (Class of 2022), offensive tackle for the New England Patriots
- Toby Caston, former NFL player
- Wayne Causey, former MLB player (Baltimore Orioles, Kansas City Athletics, Chicago White Sox, California Angels, Atlanta Braves)
- Detrick DeBurr, entrepreneur, author
- James L. Dennis, United States Circuit Judge of the United States Court of Appeals for the Fifth Circuit
- John Diarse (Class of 2013), former Denver Broncos wide receiver
- Justin Ellis (Class of 2009), former New York Giants defensive tackle
- Hugh H. Goodwin (1900-1979), Vice admiral in the Navy
- Lance Heard (Class of 2023), college football offensive tackle for the Kentucky Wildcats
- Bill Johnson (Class of 1974), longtime NFL and college football coach
- Bob Lane, former NFL player
- Rashard Lawrence, nose tackle for the San Antonio Brahmas
- Max Mitchell, offensive tackle for the New York Jets
- Alex Presley (b. 1985, Class of 2003), former MLB outfielder
- Melvin Rambin, former mayor of Monroe
- Barry Rubin (born 1957), Senior Strength and Conditioning Coach of the Buffalo Bills
- Red Swanson, former MLB player (Pittsburgh Pirates)
- Marc Swayze, comic book artist
- KaVontae Turpin, wide receiver for the Dallas Cowboys
- Phidarian Mathis, defensive tackle for the Buffalo Bills
