= Marguerite Littman =

American-British socialite and AIDS activist (1930–2020)

- Littman in 1987
- Born: Marguerite Lamkin; May 4, 1930; Monroe, Louisiana, U.S.
- Died: October 16, 2020 (aged 90); London, England
- Occupations: Socialite; activist
- Spouses: Harry Brown (m. 1952; div.) Rory Harrity (m. 1959; div.); Mark Littman (m. 1965; died 2015)
- Relatives: Speed Lamkin (brother)

Marguerite Lamkin Brown Harrity Littman (May 4, 1930 – October 16, 2020) was an American-British socialite and HIV/AIDS activist. As a Southern American accent coach she is known to have coached actors including Elizabeth Taylor and Paul Newman. Littman is remembered for her role in HIV/AIDS advocacy, including fundraising for charities.

== Early life ==
Marguerite Lamkin was born on May 4, 1930, to Eugenia and Ebenezer Lamkin in Monroe, Louisiana. Her father was a lawyer and her mother a homemaker. She studied philosophy at Newcomb College and later at Finch College in New York City. Her brother, Speed Lamkin, went on to become a novelist and playwright.

== Career ==
She moved to Los Angeles after her studies in New York and became a voice coach specializing in the Southern American accent. She coached actors including Elizabeth Taylor and Paul Newman in southern-themed movies such as Baby Doll, Cat on a Hot Tin Roof, The Long, Hot Summer, and Raintree County. It has been claimed that Author Truman Capote famously modeled his famous southern character, Holly Golightly, in his 1958 Breakfast at Tiffany's novella, partially after Littman.

In the early 1960s, she moved to New York City, where she worked with photographer Richard Avedon, supporting him while he was working on his book Nothing Personal (1964), a collection of portraits of civil rights workers. She was also an advice columnist for Glamour magazine. She moved to London in 1965. Between 1976 and 1985, she modelled for Andy Warhol's minimalist Polaroid portraits, depicting her transformation over the nine-year period.

Littman started the AIDS Crisis Trust in 1986, as a charity to collect funds for AIDS research and treatment. As a start, she had written to over 300 of her socialite friends asking for a contribution of £100 to be founding members. The trust organized gala events and auctions to raise funds for the cause. The trust went on to become one of Britain's most prominent AIDS-awareness charity groups. The trust's auctions would offer pieces from her socialite friends including Elizabeth Taylor and David Hockney. During this period, Littman was introduced to Diana, Princess of Wales, who was already associated with AIDS-related charities across the world. In 1997, Diana donated her entire wardrobe to Littman to be auctioned. The auction, facilitated by Christie's, raised more than $3 million for the trust and other charities.

In 1999, the trust was merged with the Elton John AIDS Foundation, for whom Littman served as a director.

== Personal life ==
Lamkin married screenwriter Harry Brown on September 20, 1952; the union ended in divorce. On March 10, 1959, she remarried to actor Rory Harrity; this marriage also ended in divorce. She then married British barrister and Queen's Counsel Mark Littman, a union which lasted from 1965 until his death in 2015.

Littman died on October 16, 2020, at her home in London. Her obituary in the New York Times stated:

By all accounts hypnotically charming, Ms. Littman, who landed in Los Angeles at midcentury, counted among her closest friends the writer Christopher Isherwood and his partner, the artist Don Bachardy, as well as Gore Vidal, David Hockney and, famously, Truman Capote, who is said to have distilled that charm into his most famous character, Holly Golightly of Breakfast at Tiffany's.
