= Alton Hardy Howard =

American businessman, writer, and songwriter

- Born: March 28, 1925; Union Parish, Louisiana, U.S.
- Died: October 29, 2006 (aged 81)
- Resting place: Rocky Branch Cemetery in Union Parish
- Occupations: Businessman, author, gospel songwriter
- Relatives: V. E. Howard (brother); W. L. "Jack" Howard (brother); Korie Robertson (granddaughter)

Alton Hardy Howard (March 28, 1925 – October 29, 2006) was a businessman, author, and a gospel songwriter from West Monroe in Ouachita Parish in northeastern Louisiana.

== Background ==
Howard was the sixth of seven children born in the Rocky Branch community near Farmerville in Union Parish in North Louisiana, to a Church of Christ couple, Elisha John "Hardy" Howard (1889–1974) and the former Corinne Smith (1888–1971). Older brother Verna Elisha Howard was a Church of christ clergyman for more than four decades who founded the Texas-based International Gospel Hour. Still another older brother, W. L. "Jack" Howard, was Alton's business partner and the mayor of Monroe from 1956 to 1972 to 1976 to 1978. The youngest of the Howard siblings was Kelton Leroy Howard (1928–1994). Howard was predeceased by two sisters, Euphra H. Terry (1914–1980) and Cassyle H. McMurry (1918–1989).

During World War II, Howard served in the Ninth Air Force and flew twelve missions over Germany as a gunner on a B26 bomber.

== Business and church activities ==
In 1946, Alton and Jack Howard co-founded Howard Brothers Jewelers; in 1959, the regional chain, Howard Brothers Discount Stores. In 1969, he started Howard Publishing Company and, along with his son, John Howard, launched in 1984 Super Saver Wholesale Warehouse Club. Howard further owned an insurance agency, several restaurants, clothing stores, oil and gas operations, and his music business. He also developed several subdivisions.

He was one of the founders and a longtime elder (1963–2004) of the White's Ferry Road Church of Christ in West Monroe. In 1967, he established Camp Ch-Yo-Ca, a Christian youth camp. He wrote several books and gospel songs. His Howard hymnals have sold more than three million copies and are used in churches worldwide. Howard worked to establish "World Radio", an international ministry which broadcasts the gospel of Jesus Christ in native languages.

== Death and legacy ==
Howard was married to the former Mamie Jean Meador (1927–2013), a native of Arkadelphia, Arkansas, and the daughter of Ben and Willie Meador. In addition to son John and his wife Chrys (parents of Korie Robertson, the spouse of Willie Robertson) the Howards had two daughters— Mary Howard Owen (whose husband is Mac) and Janice Howard Owen (with husband David). Alton and Jean Howard are interred with his primary family members, except for brother Jack Howard, at the Rocky Branch Cemetery in Union Parish.

According to Dave Norris, the mayor of West Monroe since 1978, Howard was

a great song writer – he wrote very powerful music. Some years ago he gave me a copy of a hymnal in which he wrote many, if not all of the hymns. I've gone through, looked at it, and sung them numerous times. ... He was a very important person in a lot of ways, but I think his contributions to the church were the things that were closest to his heart and meant the most to him. He certainly made a great difference in our community ...

State Senator Mike Walsworth of West Monroe, then a state representative, described Howard as "one of the founders of modern West Monroe ... and a great businessman in our community."

Howard published the following books and hymnals:

- Songs of the Church
- Songs of the Church Twenty-First Century Edition
- Songs of Faith and Praise
- Money Grow$ on Tree$: How to Make, Manage, and Master Money
- Foundations of Faith
- Timeless Moments: Sacred Events That Shaped Eternity

Hymns he wrote include:

- God Still Lives
- I Believe in Jesus
- There's a Light Shining
- Where Peace Like a River
- There's a Rainbow in the Cloud
- Wonderful He Is to Me
- I Walk with the King
- He Gave Me a Song
- Tell Them of Jesus
- Sail Away Home
- Jesus is Calling
- God Heal Our Land
