= Speed Lamkin =

American novelist (1927–2011)

- Born: Hillyer Speed Lamkin; November 2, 1927; Monroe, Louisiana, U.S.
- Died: May 3, 2011 (aged 83); Monroe, Louisiana, U.S.
- Resting place: Old City Cemetery, Monroe, Louisiana, U.S.
- Education: Harvard University
- Occupations: Novelist; playwright

Hillyer Speed Lamkin (born Monroe, Louisiana, November 2, 1927 – Monroe, Louisiana, May 3, 2011) was an American novelist and playwright. He is best known for his first novel Tiger in the Garden (1950) and was called "the poor man's Truman Capote" by the composer Ned Rorem. He was a recipient of a 1950 O. Henry Award for his short story Comes a Day.

== Early life and education ==
Lamkin was the son of Ebb Tyler Lamkin and his wife, the former Eugenia Layton Speed. He was named for his maternal grandfather, Hillyer Rolston Speed, an insurance executive. Lamkin graduated from Harvard University in 1948, which he had entered at the age of 16. He had one sibling, Marguerite, who became a voice coach for Southern-themed films such as Baby Doll, Cat on a Hot Tin Roof, The Long, Hot Summer, and Raintree County.

== Literary career ==
Described as "short, porcine, [and] effeminate" by biographer Fred Kaplan and a "niggery, flirty, shrewd, frivolous, perceptive young person" by Christopher Isherwood, Lamkin was often compared to Truman Capote because of his Gothic prose and literary precocity. Tennessee Williams, however, observed, "He doesn't write as well but is more agreeable". Similarly jaundiced was Dodie Smith, an English novelist and playwright, who described Lamkin as "a nice bright child but with an ounce of talent only, and not a reliable critic".

He became a sensation at age 22 with the publication of his 1950 novel, Tiger in the Garden. The New York Times called the Southern tale "a diffuse examination of the retirement of aristocrats before the vitality of 'new' crude opportunists" but criticized its "overall sense of a low-powered, highly polished Hollywood product".

Lamkin and his friend Gus Field wrote a dramatic adaptation of Isherwood's story Sally Bowles but it was rejected in favor of an adaptation by John van Druten. He also contributed fiction to Mademoiselle and wrote a 90-minute television script about the life of Washington, D.C. hostess and ambassador Perle Mesta in 1956; its intended star was Rosalind Russell though the role was eventually played by Shirley Booth. In 1950 he was hired to write an English-language version of La Otra, a Mexican film starring Dolores del Río; it was reportedly being written as a vehicle for Joan Crawford.

He also wrote for television and Broadway, notably Comes a Day, a 1958 play that starred Judith Anderson, Brandon deWilde, Michael J. Pollard, Eileen Ryan, and George C. Scott. Produced by Cheryl Crawford and Alan J. Pakula, the play was not a success, being described by The New York Times as "a puzzling drama" that was "uneven [and] baffling" and which bore "a surface resemblance to art in the Tennessee Williams manner." The Harvard Crimson, in its review, called the play's dialogue "spotted with clichés" and observed that the plot echoed other dramatic works of the day.

After Comes a Day closed, Lamkin returned permanently to Monroe, Louisiana.

== Published works ==
- Tiger in the Garden (Houghton Mifflin, 1950)
- Comes a Day, short story, winner of O. Henry Award, 1950
- The Easter Egg Hunt (Houghton Mifflin, 1954)
- Midsummer, a television play for Matinee Theatre, 1955
- The Hostess with the Mostess, a television play, 1957
- Comes a Day, a three-act play, 1958
- Out by the Country Club, a short story turned play, written with Eva Wolas, 1961
