= Barry Rubin (American football) =

American football player and coach (born 1957)

Buffalo Bills
- Title: Senior strength & conditioning assistant

Personal information
- Born: June 25, 1957 (age 69); Monroe, Louisiana, U.S.

Career information
- Positions: Punter, tight end
- College: Louisiana State University; Northwestern State University

Career history
- Northeast Louisiana University: Graduate assistant (1981–1982); Assistant strength coach (1982–1984); Strength coach (1984–1985); Strength coach (1994–1995); Louisiana State University: Strength coach (1987–1990); Green Bay Packers: Strength and conditioning assistant (1995–1999); Head strength and conditioning coach (1999–2005); Philadelphia Eagles: Head strength and conditioning coach (2010–2012); Kansas City Chiefs: Head strength and conditioning coach (2013–2022); Buffalo Bills: Senior strength and conditioning assistant (2025–present)

Awards and highlights
- As coach: 3× Super Bowl champion (XXXI, LIV, LVII)

Barry Rubin (born June 25, 1957) is an American football coach who is a senior strength & conditioning assistant for the Buffalo Bills of the National Football League (NFL). He previously served as the head strength and conditioning coach of the Kansas City Chiefs. He is a member of the USA Strength and Conditioning Coaches Hall of Fame.

== Early life ==
Rubin was born in Monroe, Louisiana, the son of Sam and Eileen Rubin. He attended Neville High School, lettering three years in football (winning all-district honors as a running back and punter), baseball, and basketball and twice in track.

== College football career ==
In 1976, Rubin began playing for the LSU Tigers football team as a running back and punter.

Following the 1977 season, he transferred to Northwestern State University, where he was a punter and a tight end, and received his B.A. in 1981. While there, he played alongside future NFL players Bobby Hebert, Mark Duper, Joe Delaney, and Gary Reasons. In 1979, he set a school record with a 75-yard punt, and was named to the Jewish All-American team.

== Coaching career ==
Rubin began coaching as a graduate assistant at Northeast Louisiana University in 1981. He became assistant strength coach the following year. In 1984, he was promoted to strength coach and remained in that position until 1985. After serving as strength coach at LSU from 1987 to 1990, Rubin returned to Northeast Louisiana University in 1994.

In 1995, Rubin was hired as strength and conditioning assistant with the Green Bay Packers. While serving in that position, he was a member of the Super Bowl XXXI champion Packers, as well as the team that won the NFC Championship the following year. He was promoted to head strength and conditioning coach in 1999. Rubin remained with the Packers until 2005.

In 2010, he was named head strength and conditioning coach of the Philadelphia Eagles. He later assumed the same role for the Kansas City Chiefs, after Andy Reid was hired there as head coach. In 2019, Rubin won Super Bowl LIV when the Chiefs defeated the San Francisco 49ers 31–20. In 2022, Rubin won Super Bowl LVII when the Chiefs defeated the Philadelphia Eagles 38–35.

In 2025, Rubin was hired as the senior strength & conditioning assistant coach for the Buffalo Bills.

== Halls of Fame ==
In 2003, Rubin was inducted into the USA Strength and Conditioning Coaches Hall of Fame. He was inducted into the Northwestern (La.) State Hall of Fame in 2014.
