= Tyree Hollins =

American gridiron football player (born 1992)

No. 41
- Position: Defensive back

Personal information
- Born: March 26, 1992 (age 34); Monroe, Louisiana, U.S.
- Listed height: 5 ft 9 in (1.75 m)
- Listed weight: 190 lb (86 kg)

Career information
- High school: Monroe (LA) Carroll
- College: Grambling State

Career history
- 2015: Saskatchewan Roughriders
- 2016–2017: Montreal Alouettes
- Stats at CFL.ca

Tyree Hollins (born March 26, 1992) is an American former professional football defensive back who played for the Saskatchewan Roughriders and Montreal Alouettes of the Canadian Football League (CFL). He played college football at Grambling State University.

== Early life and college ==
Hollins attended Carroll High School in Monroe, Louisiana.

Hollins played in 37 games for the Grambling State Tigers from 2011 to 2014, recording nine interceptions for 147 return yards. He accumulated 72 tackles, five interceptions, two forced fumbles and a fumble recovery his senior year.

== Professional career ==
Pre-draft measurables
Height	Weight	40-yard dash	10-yard split	20-yard split	20-yard shuttle	Three-cone drill
5 ft 9 in (1.75 m)	188 lb (85 kg)	4.68 s	1.67 s	2.72 s	4.41 s	7.65 s
All values from Grambling State Pro Day

Hollins signed with the Saskatchewan Roughriders in May 2015. He made his CFL debut on July 5, 2015 against the Toronto Argonauts. He played in thirteen games, all starts, for the team during the 2015 season, recording 44 defensive tackles, seven pass knockdowns, and five special teams tackles. Hollins spent one game on the practice roster and four games on the injured list. He was released by the team on June 19, 2016.

Hollins was signed to the Montreal Alouettes' practice roster on August 17, 2016. He dressed in five games for the Alouettes in 2016. He dressed in 16 games, starting 13, in 2017. Hollins was released on November 29, 2017.
