= Nehemie Kankolongo =

Canadian football player (born 1992)

Profile
- Position: Linebacker

Personal information
- Born: April 4, 1992 (age 34); Coquitlam, British Columbia, Canada
- Listed height: 5 ft 11 in (1.80 m)
- Listed weight: 205 lb (93 kg)

Career information
- College: Wyoming
- CFL draft: 2014: undrafted

Career history
- 2015: Saskatchewan Roughriders
- 2016: BC Lions
- 2017: Winnipeg Blue Bombers
- 2017: Montreal Alouettes
- 2017: Edmonton Eskimos
- Stats at CFL.ca

Nehemie Kankolongo (born April 4, 1992) is a Canadian former professional football linebacker who played in the Canadian Football League (CFL). He played college football for the Wyoming Cowboys.

== Professional career ==
Kankolongo was signed as an undrafted free agent by the Saskatchewan Roughriders on May 27, 2015. After one season with the Roughriders, he was released during the 2016 training camp and was subsequently signed by the BC Lions on June 20, 2016. Kankolongo played in 13 games with the Lions, but was released at the team's training camp on June 10, 2017. In 2017, he dressed in two games for the Winnipeg Blue Bombers, four games for the Montreal Alouettes, and one game for the Edmonton Eskimos.
