= Jeff Knox Jr. =

American football player (born 1992)

Profile
- Position: Linebacker

Personal information
- Born: February 22, 1992 (age 34); Pittsburgh, Pennsylvania
- Listed height: 6 ft 2 in (1.88 m)
- Listed weight: 225 lb (102 kg)

Career information
- High school: Hyattsville (MD) DeMatha Catholic
- College: California (PA)
- NFL draft: 2014: undrafted

Career history
- Saskatchewan Roughriders (2015–2016); Tampa Bay Buccaneers (2017)*; Saskatchewan Roughriders (2017); Tampa Bay Buccaneers (2018)*; Washington Redskins (2018)*; Tennessee Titans (2018)*; Toronto Argonauts (2018); Ottawa Redblacks (2019); Toronto Argonauts (2020)*
- * Offseason or practice squad member only
- Stats at Pro Football Reference
- Stats at CFL.ca

Jeffrey Ali Knox Jr. (born February 22, 1992) is a professional Canadian football linebacker who is a free agent. He made his professional debut in 2015 with the Saskatchewan Roughriders after going undrafted in the 2014 NFL draft. He has also been a member of the Tampa Bay Buccaneers, Washington Redskins, Tennessee Titans, Ottawa Redblacks, and Toronto Argonauts.

== Professional career ==
=== Saskatchewan Roughriders (first stint) ===
Knox signed with the Saskatchewan Roughriders of the Canadian Football League (CFL) on May 8, 2015. Knox made the Riders roster following the training camp in June 2015, and following an injury to the team's starting middle linebacker, Knox took over duties as the middle linebacker for the Roughriders. Knox had an outstanding first season in the CFL, amassing 112 tackles over the course of the season, only 2 shy of first place Adam Bighill. He also contributed 10 special teams tackles and one interception. His performance was recognized by his peers when he was named a CFL West All-Star. Knox's 2016 season was not as spectacular as his rookie campaign as he played though injuries for portions of the season. In 17 regular season games he collected 65 defensive tackles, 19 special teams tackles, and 1 quarterback sack. Following the 2016 season, on January 14, 2017, Knox was released by the Roughriders allowing him to sign a contract with an NFL team.

=== Tampa Bay Buccaneers (first stint) ===
A few hours later, Knox signed a three-year contract with the Tampa Bay Buccaneers of the NFL. He was waived on September 2, 2017.

=== Saskatchewan Roughriders (second stint) ===
Knox re-signed with the Saskatchewan Roughriders on September 11, 2017. Knox only played eight games for the Riders in 2017, contributing 23 defensive tackles, seven tackles on special teams and one quarterback sack. On January 31, 2018, two weeks prior to becoming a free agent, Knox was released by the Riders to pursue an NFL contract.

=== Tampa Bay Buccaneers (second stint) ===
On February 7, 2018, Knox signed with the Tampa Bay Buccaneers. He was waived on May 17, 2018.

=== Washington Redskins ===
Knox signed with the Washington Redskins on August 11, 2018, but was waived on August 18.

=== Tennessee Titans ===
On August 21, 2018, Knox was signed by the Tennessee Titans. He was waived on September 1, 2018.

=== Toronto Argonauts (first stint) ===
On September 6, 2018, it was announced that Knox had signed with the Toronto Argonauts. He was not re-signed by the club following the season, and became a free agent in February 2019.

=== Ottawa Redblacks ===
On July 8, 2019, Knox signed with the Ottawa Redblacks. Knox made his debut for the Redblacks in Week 8 where he contributed with one defensive tackle. He was released by the club less than a month later on August 5, 2019. Knox was added to the Redblacks' practice roster on August 20, 2019. He was released by the Redblacks on January 23, 2020.

=== Toronto Argonauts (second stint) ===
On February 3, 2020, it was announced that Knox had re-signed with the Toronto Argonauts. He was released on December 28, 2020.

== Personal life ==
On October 30, 2020, an arrest warrant was issued for Knox Jr., who faces several charges that includes 2 counts of attempted homicide, 2 counts of aggravated assault, & reckless endangerment of another person after a shooting incident in Pittsburgh, Pennsylvania on October 23, 2020.

He currently lives in Pittsburgh, PA and has 3 children.
