= Tim Agbaje =

Canadian football player (born 1990)

No. 92
- Position: Defensive lineman

Personal information
- Born: May 16, 1990 (age 36); Edmonton, Alberta, Canada
- Listed height: 6 ft 5 in (1.96 m)
- Listed weight: 290 lb (132 kg)

Career information
- High school: Archbishop O'Leary High School
- CJFL: Edmonton Wildcats
- University: Saskatchewan Huskies
- CFL draft: 2015: undrafted

Career history
- 2015: Saskatchewan Roughriders
- Stats at CFL.ca

Tim Agbaje (born May 16, 1990) is a Canadian football defensive lineman who is currently a free agent. He was signed as an undrafted free agent by the Saskatchewan Roughriders on May 27, 2015. He first played CJFL for the Edmonton Wildcats for five seasons before playing CIS football for the Saskatchewan Huskies from 2013 to 2014.
