= Matthew Rea =

Canadian football player (born 1991)

Profile
- Position: Fullback

Personal information
- Born: November 25, 1991 (age 34); London, Ontario, Canada
- Listed height: 6 ft 1 in (1.85 m)
- Listed weight: 242 lb (110 kg)

Career information
- High school: Rochester Adams HS
- College: Michigan State
- CFL draft: 2015: 4th round, 35th overall pick

Career history
- 2015: Saskatchewan Roughriders
- 2016: Edmonton Eskimos*
- * Offseason or practice squad member only
- Stats at CFL.ca (archive)

Matthew Rea (born November 25, 1991) is a former gridiron football fullback. He previously attended Michigan State University, where he played college football for the Spartans and studied finance.

== Early career ==
Rea played high school football at Rochester Adams High School, where he was a player while the team won three league championships. He also played lacrosse at Rochester Adams and was a member while the lacrosse team won two league championships. Rea committed to play for the Penn Quakers at the University of Pennsylvania, and he maintained redshirt status in 2010. In 2011, he played in all 10 games for the Quakers as a backup defensive tackle. Rea transferred to Michigan State and participated primarily on the scout team as a fullback. He was not eligible to play in 2012 due to rules related to transferring, and did not play any games in 2013. Rea played in three games as a backup fullback in his final season.

== Professional career ==
Rea participated in the regional and national CFL Combines in Toronto. He achieved the highest value of 29 repetitions of the 225 pounds (102 kg) bench press at the regional combine as well as 31 repetitions at the national combine, the most among running backs. Rea was selected in the fourth round of the 2015 CFL draft by the Saskatchewan Roughriders with the 35th overall pick. Rea made the active roster following the preseason as the Roughriders' backup fullback, and he made his CFL debut in the season opener against the Winnipeg Blue Bombers on June 27.
