= Melvin Rambin =

American politician

Melvin Leo Rambin

Mayor of Monroe, Louisiana, US
- In office July 3, 2000 – June 19, 2001
- Preceded by: Abe E. Pierce, III
- Succeeded by: Jamie Mayo

Personal details
- Born: October 7, 1941
- Died: June 19, 2001 (aged 59) Monroe, Louisiana
- Resting place: Roselawn Memorial Park Cemetery in Baton Rouge, Louisiana
- Party: Republican
- Spouse: Julia Ann Wilkinson Rambin
- Education: University of Louisiana at Monroe; Louisiana State University
- Occupation: Banker

Melvin Leo Rambin (October 7, 1941 – June 19, 2001) was an American banker in Monroe, the seat of Ouachita Parish in northeastern Louisiana, who was thus far the only Republican in his city to have held the office of mayor since the 19th century era of Reconstruction. Rambin was elected in March 2000 but died in office of liver cancer after having served for only eleven-and-a-half months.

== Background ==
Rambin was the son of the former Marjorie Pennington, a Baptist and a schoolteacher, and William Robert Rambin, Sr., a Roman Catholic. The senior Rambins were natives and at time residents of Goldonna in Natchitoches Parish, where they are interred at Goldonna Cemetery. In her later years Mrs. Rambin was living in Monroe, where she died five months after son Melvin's passing, but she had been residing in Goldonna at the time of her husband's death in 1986. Rambin has a surviving older brother, William R. Rambin, Jr., of Monroe.

It is unclear when the Rambins moved from Natchitoches Parish to Monroe, but Rambin graduated in 1959 from Neville High School in Monroe. In 1963, he received his bachelor's degree from the University of Louisiana at Monroe, when the institution was known as Northeast Louisiana State College. In 1965, he obtained his Master of Business Administration from Louisiana State University in Baton Rouge. Over the course of his career, Rambin was an officer of several financial institutions, including the Louisiana National Bank in Baton Rouge, Premier Bank, and Bank One in Northeast Louisiana.

== Brief political career ==
In 1999, Rambin was appointed by Republican Governor Murphy J. Foster, Jr., as a regent of the Louisiana Board of Regents of Higher Education.

Rambin in 2000 unseated Abe E. Pierce, III, a Democrat and the first of thus far two African-American mayors of Monroe since Reconstruction. According to Pierce, his supporters were complacent and assumed that he would be reelected to a second term in 2000 and did not therefore vote in large numbers at all. Rambin's supporters, mostly whites and the numerical minority of the Monroe population, conversely organized with discretion at the grass roots. Glen Robinson (born c. 1954), a former car salesman and later the information officer for the Ouachita Parish Sheriff's Department, was the chairman of the highly organized Rambin campaign. The GOP used horns and sirens to stir up interest in their candidate and asked supporters to turn on porch lights after they had cast their ballots so that the campaign could easily target persons in friendly neighborhoods who had not yet voted to encourage them to go to the polls in the final hours.

Mayoral election day coincided with the presidential primaries in which Al Gore and George W. Bush won large majorities in Ouachita Parish on the path toward their party nominations. The final tabulation was 9,042 (53.8 percent) to Pierce's 7,219 (43 percent). The remaining 3.2 percent of the vote was divided among three other candidates. Rambin garnered 90 percent of the white vote, more than enough to win because the black turnout was just 45 percent.

After Rambin's death, the city council chose District 5 member Jamie Mayo, an African American businessman, to serve as interim mayor. In October 2001, Mayo was elected to fill the remainder of Rambin's term. He has continued to serve in the position, having won full terms in 2004, 2008, 2012, and 2016.

== Family and death ==
Rambin was a lifetime member of the Men's Club of Catholic High School in Baton Rouge. He was married to the former Julia Ann Wilkinson (born c. 1944), an employee of the United Way. The Rambin children are Ashley A. Rambin Gordon, Ryan C. Rambin, and Sharon L. Rambin Beary.

Rambin died in office as mayor of Monroe at the age of fifty-nine. He is interred not in Monroe but at Roselawn Memorial Park in Baton Rouge.

== See also ==
- List of mayors of Monroe, Louisiana

| Preceded by Abe E. Pierce, III | Mayor of Monroe, Ouachita Parish, Louisiana; 2000–2001 | Succeeded by Jamie Mayo |
