= Abe E. Pierce III =

American educator and politician (1934–2021)

Abe Edward Pierce III

Mayor of Monroe
- In office July 1, 1996 – July 3, 2000
- Preceded by: Robert E. "Bob" Powell
- Succeeded by: Melvin Rambin

Personal details
- Born: October 28, 1934 Monroe, Louisiana
- Died: August 1, 2021 (aged 86)
- Party: Democratic
- Spouse: Dorothy Richard-Pierce (married 1955)
- Children: Including: Abe E. Pierce IV
- Education: Southern University
- Occupation: Educator

Abe Edward Pierce III (October 28, 1934 – August 1, 2021) was an American educator and politician in his native Monroe, Louisiana, who was the first African American to have served as mayor of his city. A Democrat, Pierce held the position for one term from 1996 to 2000, when he was unseated by the Republican candidate, Melvin Rambin.

== Background ==
A graduate of the former Monroe Colored High School prior to desegregation and the historically black Southern University in Baton Rouge, Pierce was thereafter a classroom teacher of biology, chemistry, and physics for ten years at Richwood High School in Monroe, where he was also briefly the principal before he was elevated into school administration, as supervisor of secondary education and then as an assistant superintendent. He recalled his first teacher salary as $240 per month. His wife, Dorothy Richard-Pierce, a native of Opelousas, was also a teacher; Pierce first thought that they could save her monthly salary. Of all his jobs for the Ouachita Parish School Board, Pierce said that teaching had been the most personally satisfying. Pierce also operated with his friend, Mackie Freeze, a small business in Monroe, Pierce's Dairy Delight.

Prior to his mayoral tenure, Pierce served for twenty-six years as a member of the Ouachita Parish Police Jury, the parish governing body. He was the first African American to serve on the police jury and the first to be named president of the police jury. Pierce had been the president of the youth council of the Monroe branch of the National Association for the Advancement of Colored People and was active in the civil rights movement. Pierce said that his political involvement began at his home church, the New Tabernacle Baptist Church in Monroe under the long-term pastor Roosevelt Wright.

== Mayoral term ==
In the 1996 nonpartisan blanket primary for mayor of Monroe, Pierce led a field of six candidates with 5,584 votes (35.5 percent). Republican John Bryant trailed with 4,212 votes (26.8 percent). Trailing in third place was Democrat Gene Tarver, who polled 3,812 votes (24.2 percent); 17-year incumbent Robert E. "Bob" Powell finished in fourth place with 1,565 votes (10 percent). In the runoff with Bryant, Pierce prevailed by 385 votes, 9,874 (51 percent) to 9,489 (49 percent). After forty years, Pierce left the employment of the school board on June 30, 1996, the day before he took the oath of office as mayor.

Pierce sought reelection in 2000; mayoral election day in Monroe coincides with the presidential primaries; that year Al Gore and George W. Bush won large majorities in Ouachita Parish on the path toward their party nominations. The final tabulation was 9,042 (53.8 percent) for Rambin to 7,219 (43 percent) for Pierce. The remaining 3.2 percent of the vote was divided among three other candidates. Pierce blamed his defeat for a second term on complacency in the majority black community in Monroe. Only 45 percent of registered black voters came to the polls; there was a much larger turnout among whites, who gave 90 percent of their ballots to Rambin, a banker in, first, Baton Rouge, and then Monroe. Soon into his term Rambin contracted liver cancer and died after only eleven-and-a-half months in office.

After Rambin's death, the Monroe City Council then named its president, Jamie Mayo, an African American from District 5, as the interim mayor. Mayo then won the special election in October 2001 and full terms in 2004, 2008, and 2012.

Pierce resided in Monroe until his death at the age of 86. At the age of sixty-nine, he ran for mayor again in 2004 but finished in fourth place in the primary with 2,123 votes (15.2 percent). Mayo went on to defeat the Republican Donald Spatafora to secure his first full term. He died in 2021. Less than two weeks after Pierce's passing, the city council, with Independent Mayor Friday Ellis concurring, voted to rename the Monroe Convention Center in Pierce's honor.

== See also ==
- List of mayors of Monroe, Louisiana

Preceded by Robert E. "Bob" Powell	Mayor of Monroe, Ouachita Parish, Louisiana; 1996-2000	Succeeded by Melvin Rambin
