= Howard Brothers Discount Stores =

American retail chain

Howard Brothers Discount Stores (informally known as Howard Brothers and Howard's) was a chain of discount stores in the Southeastern United States. The chain was founded in 1959 by Alton Hardy Howard and W. L. "Jack" Howard, a five-term mayor of Monroe, Louisiana. The Howards were an early franchisee of Gibson's Discount Center, but they later pulled out of the franchise agreement and opened stores under their own name. In 1969, the company became a publicly traded company.

Logos used before and after the 1978 chain overhaul

In March 1978, the chain began modernizing its stores with new green and orange livery, and began being referred to as “Howard’s BranDiscount” to emphasize the store's low prices. In June of the same year, the then 78-store chain was purchased by Gamble-Skogmo, which later merged with Wickes Companies. It had stores in Alabama, Arkansas, Florida, Georgia, Kentucky, Mississippi, Oklahoma, Tennessee, and Texas, as well as the Howards's native Louisiana. The HBD management attempted a buyout in 1986, but was unsuccessful.

After the stores under their own name were liquidated, the Howard brothers started a new chain of wholesale warehouse stores under the name Super Saver. At least 21 stores were opened before the chain was sold to Wal-Mart.
