= 2026 United States House of Representatives elections in Louisiana =

- November 3, 2026; December 12, 2026 (runoff)

All 6 Louisiana seats to the United States House of Representatives
	Majority party	Minority party
Party	Republican	Democratic
Last election	4	2
Seats won	3	1
Popular vote	789,509	645,894
Percentage	54.10%	44.26%
Democratic
Hold
Republican
Hold
TBD in runoff
Democratic
70–80%
Republican
50–60%
60–70%
TBD in runoff

District lines to be used from the 2026 elections, per SB 121 signed by the Governor of Louisiana on May 29, 2026 Interactive map version

The 2026 United States House of Representatives elections in Louisiana were held November 3, 2026, to elect the 6 U.S. representatives from the state of Louisiana, one from each of the state's congressional districts. The elections coincided with the other elections to the House of Representatives, elections to the United States Senate, and various state and local elections. In races where no candidate receives over 50% of the vote, runoff elections will take place on December 12, 2026.

Party primary elections were originally scheduled for May 16, 2026, with the potential primary runoffs scheduled for June 27. On April 30, Governor Jeff Landry announced that he would postpone the primaries to give state legislators time to redraw congressional maps following the United States Supreme Court decision in Louisiana v. Callais. It was then decided that they will be held using the jungle primary system, in which all candidates regardless of party compete on the same ballot on the date of the general election, November 3. 50% of the vote is required to win the election outright; otherwise, a runoff is scheduled for December 12.

== Redistricting ==
In April 2026, the Supreme Court ruled on Louisiana v. Callais that stricter scrutiny had to be applied with regard to section 2 of the Voting Rights Act. The state following the ruling requested the Court strike down the lower court ruling to have two black majority districts, which it proceeded to do. The state government pushed to move back the primary dates in light of the court requiring redistricting. On May 29, 2026, Governor Jeff Landry signed a new map into law, removing one of the two plurality-Black, Democratic-controlled districts.

== District 1 ==
2026 Louisiana's 1st congressional district election
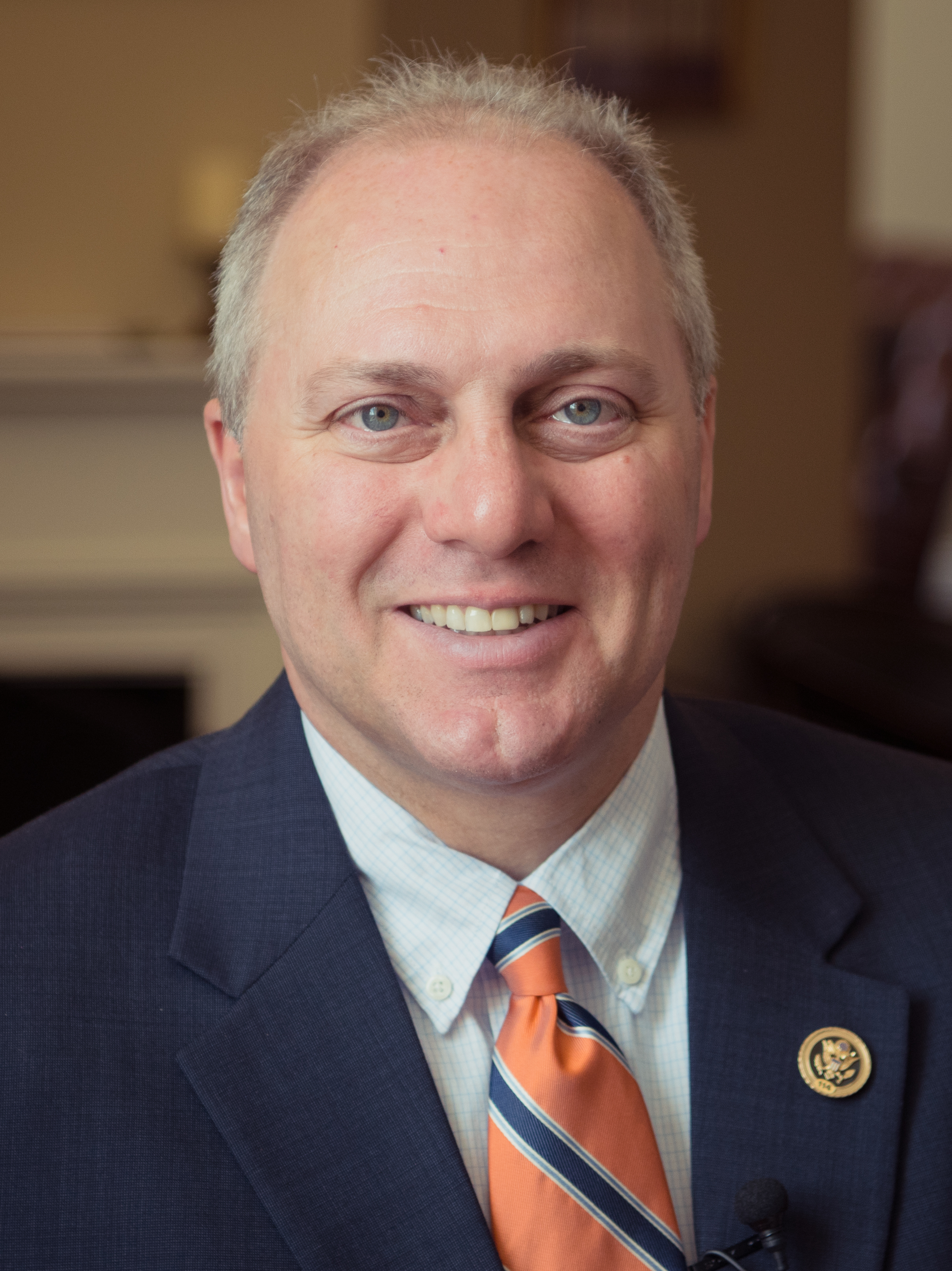

Nominee	Steve Scalise	Lauren Jewett
Party	Republican	Democratic
Popular vote	159,896	89,440
Percentage	60.7%	34.0%
U.S. Representative before election
Steve Scalise
Republican
Elected U.S. Representative
Steve Scalise
Republican

Louisiana's 1st congressional district boundary from the 2026 elections Interactive map version

The 1st district is based in the suburbs of New Orleans, spanning from the northern shore of Lake Pontchartrain south to the Mississippi River Delta. The incumbent is Republican Steve Scalise, who was re-elected with 66.8% of the vote in 2024.

=== Candidates ===
==== Declared ====
- Randall Arrington (Republican), Navy veteran
- E. Glass (Independent)
- Lauren Jewett (Democratic), special education teacher
- Steve Scalise (Republican), incumbent U.S. representative and House Majority Leader

==== Withdrawn ====
- Jim Long (Democratic)
- Donna Major (Democratic)
- Candida Pagel (Democratic)

=== General election ===
==== Predictions ====
Source	Ranking	As of
Decision Desk HQ	Safe R	July 14, 2026
The Cook Political Report	Solid R	March 13, 2025
Inside Elections	Solid R	March 7, 2025
Sabato's Crystal Ball	Safe R	July 15, 2025

==== Endorsements ====
Steve Scalise (R)

Executive branch officials

- Donald Trump, president of the United States (2017–2021, 2025–present)

Organizations

- AIPAC
Lauren Jewett (D)

Labor unions

- Louisiana AFL-CIO

Organizations

- National Organization for Women
- New Orleans Democratic Socialists of America

==== Fundraising ====
Campaign finance reports as of October 14, 2026
Candidate	Raised	Spent	Cash on hand
Steve Scalise (R)	$11,172,078	$12,390,704	$2,912,526
Lauren Jewett (D)	$716,339	$560,253	$156,046
Source: Federal Election Commission

==== Results ====
2026 Louisiana's 1st congressional district election
Party	Candidate	Votes	%
Republican	Steve Scalise (incumbent)	159,896	60.71
Democratic	Lauren Jewett	89,440	33.96
Republican	Randall Arrington	9,776	3.71
Independent	E. Glass	4,279	1.62
Total votes		263,391	100

== District 2 ==
2026 Louisiana's 2nd congressional district election
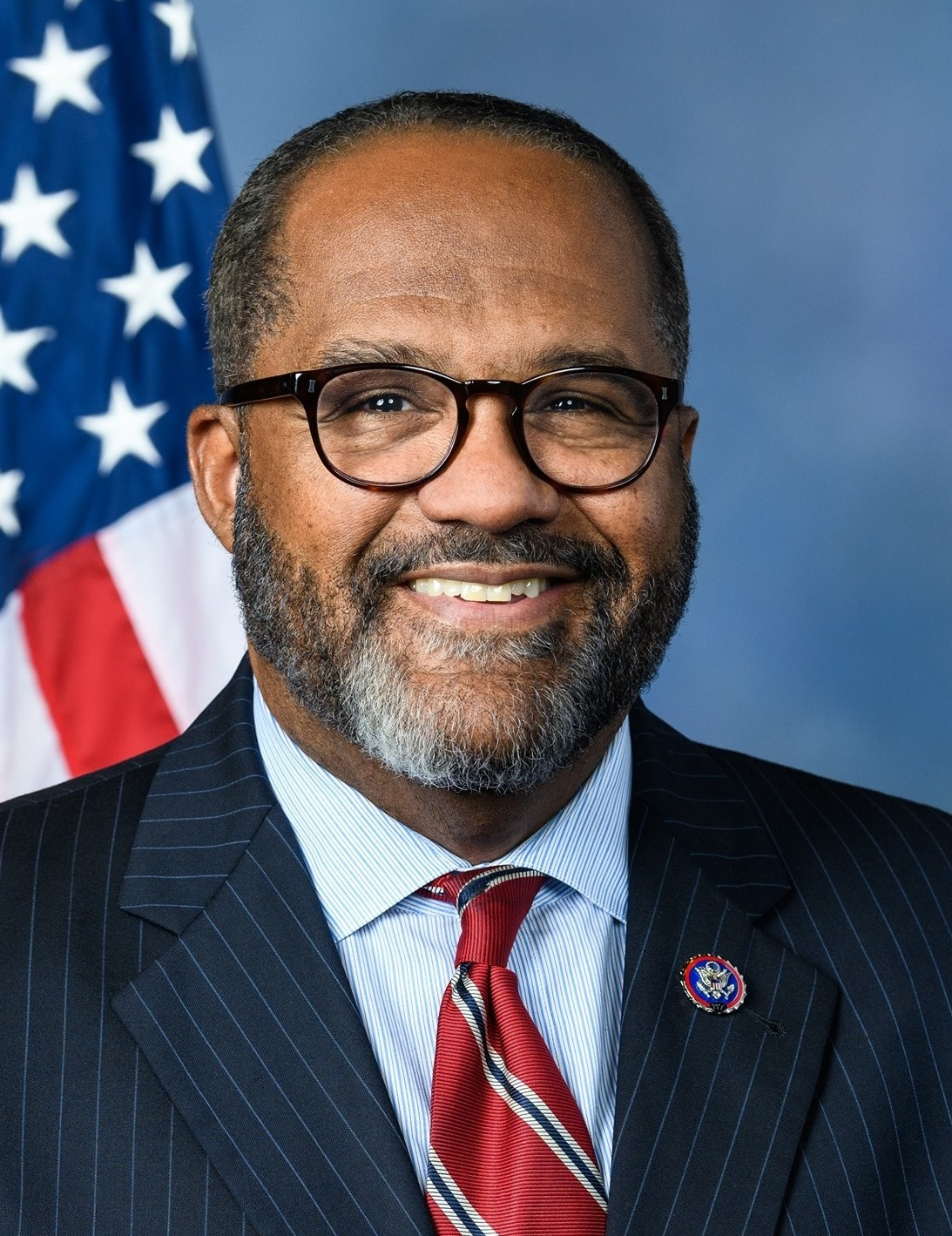

Nominee	Troy Carter	Peter Williams
Party	Democratic	Republican
Popular vote	192,286	36,369
Percentage	79.9%	15.1%
U.S. Representative before election
Troy Carter
Democratic
Elected U.S. Representative
Troy Carter
Democratic

Louisiana's 2nd congressional district boundary from the 2026 elections Interactive map version

The 2nd district stretches from New Orleans to inner Baton Rouge. The incumbent is Democrat Troy Carter, who was re-elected with 60.3% of the vote in 2024.

=== Candidates ===
==== Declared ====
- Lisa Ballay (Libertarian), digital creator and wife of 2024 Presidential candidate Charles Ballay
- Walker Beach (Independent), paramedic
- Troy Carter (Democratic), incumbent U.S. representative
- Renada Collins (Democratic), businesswoman and independent candidate for mayor of New Orleans in 2025
- Peter Williams (Republican), tree farmer

=== General election ===
==== Predictions ====
Source	Ranking	As of
Decision Desk HQ	Safe D	July 14, 2026
The Cook Political Report	Solid D	March 13, 2025
Inside Elections	Solid D	March 7, 2025
Sabato's Crystal Ball	Safe D	July 15, 2025

==== Endorsements ====
Troy Carter

Organizations

- J Street
- Planned Parenthood Action Fund
- Southern Poverty Law Center Action Fund

==== Fundraising ====
Campaign finance reports as of October 14, 2026
Candidate	Raised	Spent	Cash on hand
Troy Carter (D)	$1,941,169	$1,820,112	$630,466
Lisa Ballay (L)	$1,110	$500	$610
Source: Federal Election Commission

==== Results ====
2026 Louisiana's 2nd congressional district election
Party	Candidate	Votes	%
Democratic	Troy Carter (incumbent)	192,286	79.9
Republican	Peter Williams	36,369	15.1
Libertarian	Lisa Ballay	6,409	2.7
Democratic	Renada Collins	2,999	1.2
Independent	Walker Beach	2,553	1.1
Total votes		240,616	100

== District 3 ==
2026 Louisiana's 3rd congressional district election
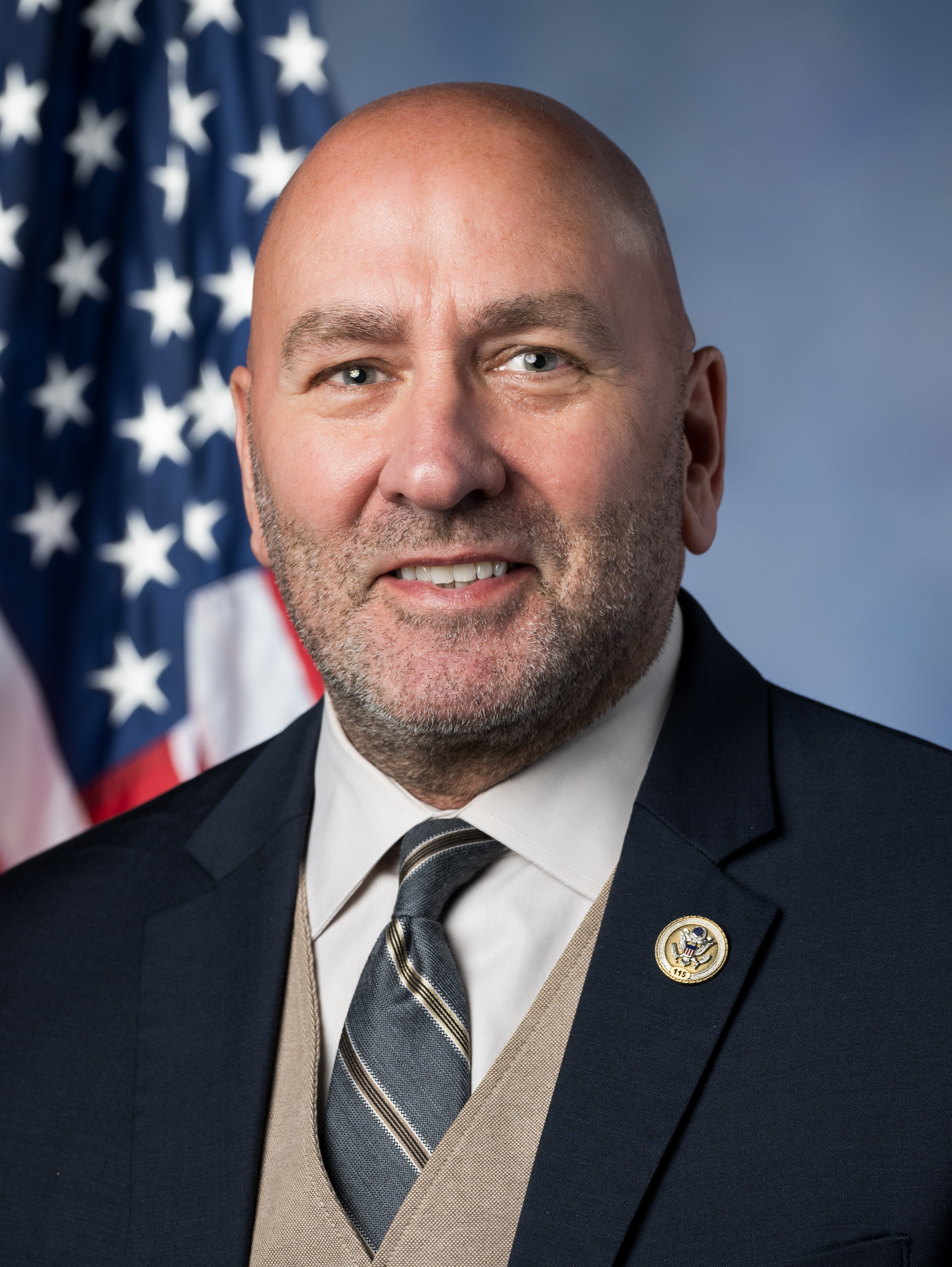

Nominee	Clay Higgins	John Day	Caleb Walker
Party	Republican	Democratic	Democratic
Popular vote	129,203	49,163	19,932
Percentage	55.0%	20.9%	8.5%
Nominee	Priscilla Gonzalez	Kate Cotten
Party	Democratic	Republican
Popular vote	16,828	15,661
Percentage	7.2%	6.7%
U.S. Representative before election
Clay Higgins
Republican
Elected U.S. Representative
Clay Higgins
Republican

Louisiana's 3rd congressional district boundary from the 2026 elections Interactive map version

The 3rd district encompasses southwestern Louisiana, taking in Lake Charles and Lafayette. The incumbent is Republican Clay Higgins, who was re-elected with 70.6% of the vote in 2024.

=== Candidates ===
==== Declared ====
- Kate Cotten (Republican), small business owner
- John Day (Democratic), former insurance industry employee
- Priscilla Gonzalez (Democratic), attorney and candidate for this district in 2024
- Clay Higgins (Republican), incumbent U.S. representative
- Tia LeBrun (Independent), teacher and Democratic candidate for this district in 2022
- Caleb Walker (Democratic), executive president of the SGA at South Louisiana Community College

=== General election ===
==== Predictions ====
Source	Ranking	As of
Decision Desk HQ	Safe R	July 14, 2026
The Cook Political Report	Solid R	March 13, 2025
Inside Elections	Solid R	March 7, 2025
Sabato's Crystal Ball	Safe R	July 15, 2025

==== Endorsements ====
John Day (D)

Political parties

- Louisiana Democratic Party
Clay Higgins (R)

Executive branch officials

- Donald Trump, 45th and 47th president of the United States (2017–2021, 2025–present)
Tia LeBrun (I)

Organizations

- National Women's Political Caucus

==== Fundraising ====
Campaign finance reports as of October 14, 2026
Candidate	Raised	Spent	Cash on hand
Clay Higgins (R)	$904,294	$662,390	$566,472
John Day (D)	$222,557	$97,819	$124,738
Tia LeBrun (I)	$7,383	$4,102	$3,880
Source: Federal Election Commission

==== Results ====
2026 Louisiana's 3rd congressional district election
Party	Candidate	Votes	%
Republican	Clay Higgins (incumbent)	129,203	55.0
Democratic	John Day	49,163	20.9
Democratic	Caleb Walker	19,932	8.5
Democratic	Priscilla Gonzalez	16,828	7.2
Republican	Kate Cotten	15,661	6.7
Independent	Tia LeBrun	4,208	1.8
Total votes		234,995	

== District 4 ==
2026 Louisiana's 4th congressional district election
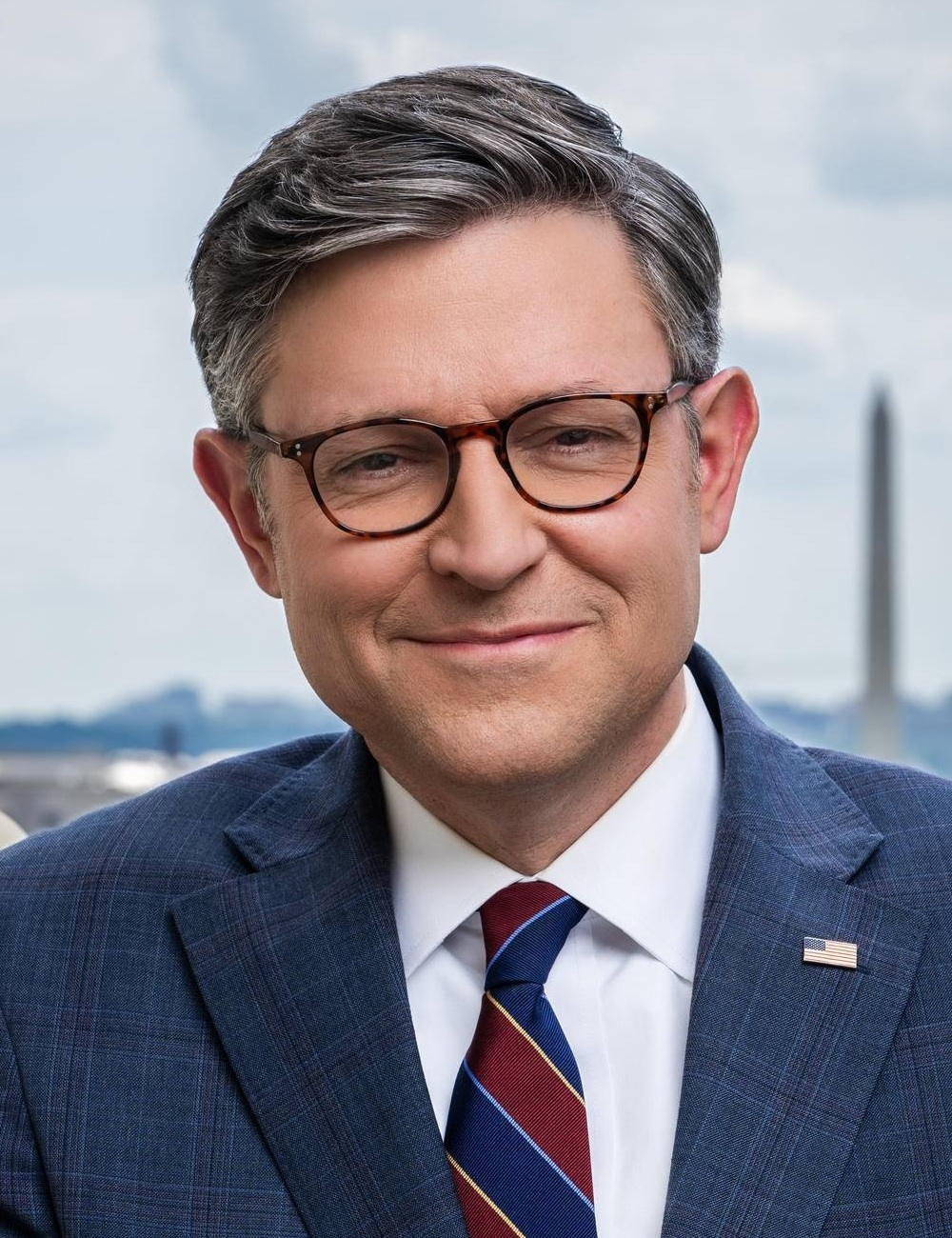

Nominee	Mike Johnson	Conrad Cable	Matt Gromlich
Party	Republican	Democratic	Democratic
Popular vote	134,750	52,899	32,868
Percentage	58.5%	23.0%	14.3%
U.S. Representative before election
Mike Johnson
Republican
Elected U.S. Representative
Mike Johnson
Republican

Louisiana's 4th congressional district boundary from the 2026 elections Interactive map version

The 4th district encompasses northwestern Louisiana, taking in the Shreveport–Bossier City metropolitan area. The incumbent is Republican and current Speaker of the House Mike Johnson, who was re-elected with 85.8% of the vote against another Republican in 2024

=== Candidates ===
==== Declared ====
- Conrad Cable (Democratic), farmer
- Matt Gromlich (Democratic), college professor
- Gordon Heslop (Republican), retired educator
- Mike Johnson (Republican), incumbent U.S. representative and Speaker of the House
- Mike Nichols (Republican), biologist

==== Withdrawn ====
- Josh Morott (Republican), substitute teacher and candidate for this district in 2024

=== General election ===
==== Predictions ====
Source	Ranking	As of
Decision Desk HQ	Safe R	July 14, 2026
The Cook Political Report	Solid R	March 13, 2025
Inside Elections	Solid R	March 7, 2025
Sabato's Crystal Ball	Safe R	July 15, 2025

==== Endorsements ====
Conrad Cable (D)

Political parties

- Louisiana Democratic Party
Mike Johnson (R)

Executive branch officials

- Donald Trump, president of the United States (2017–2021, 2025–present)

Organizations

- AIPAC

==== Fundraising ====
Campaign finance reports as of October 14, 2026
Candidate	Raised	Spent	Cash on hand
Mike Johnson (R)	$24,583,416	$19,325,044	$6,510,748
Conrad Cable (D)	$1,842,506	$1,433,698	$408,808
Matt Gromlich (D)	$452,199	$435,289	$16,846
Gordon Heslop (R)	$128,720	$124,181	$5,978
Mike Nicols (R)	$71,605	$67,933	$82
Source: Federal Election Commission

==== Results ====
2026 Louisiana's 4th congressional district election
Party	Candidate	Votes	%
Republican	Mike Johnson (incumbent)	134,750	58.5
Democratic	Conrad Cable	52,899	23.0
Democratic	Matt Gromlich	32,868	14.3
Republican	Mike Nichols	7,271	3.2
Republican	Gordon Heslop	2,571	1.1
Total votes		230,359	100

== District 5 ==
2026 Louisiana's 5th congressional district election
- November 3, 2026; December 12, 2026 (runoff)
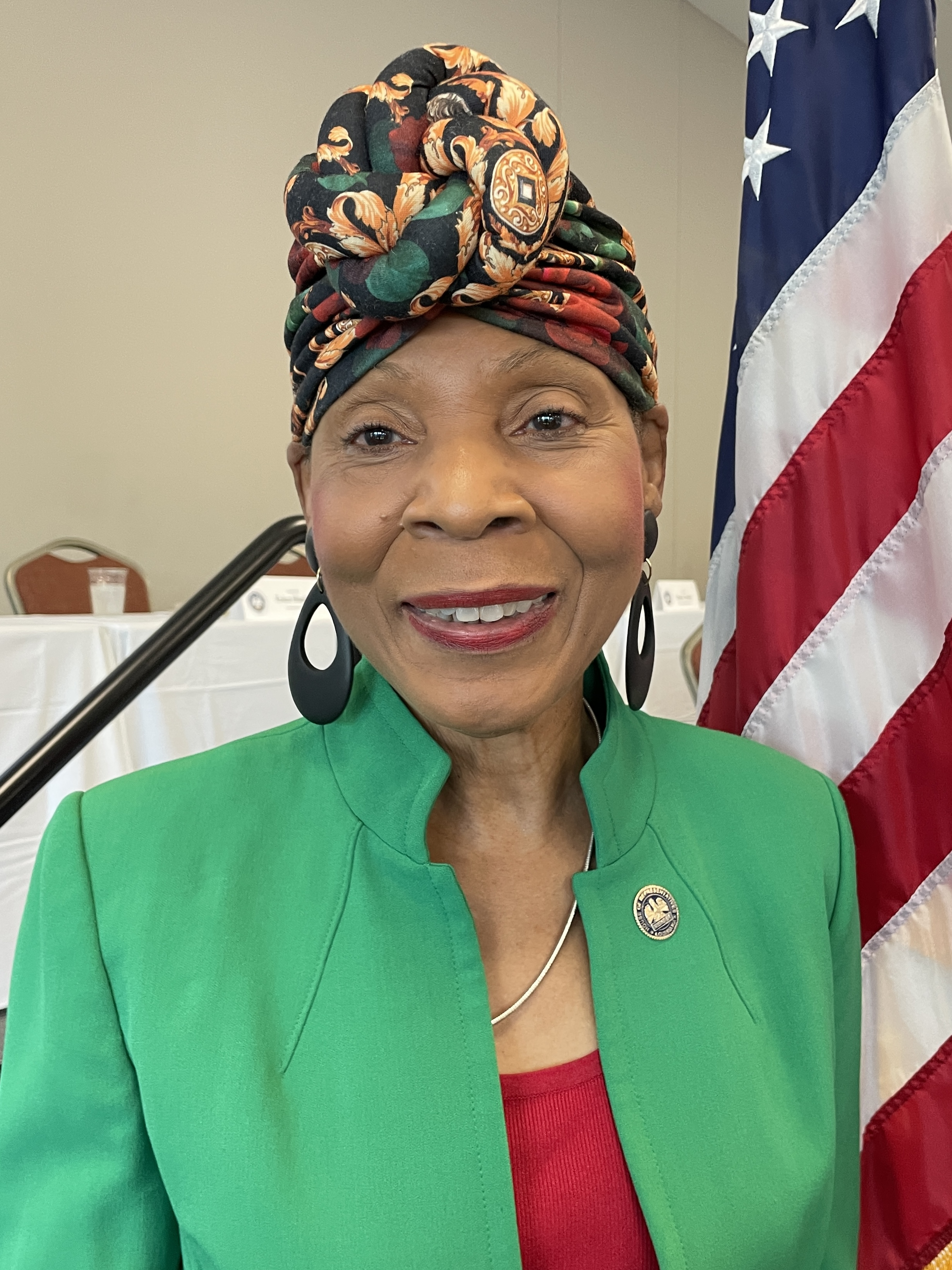

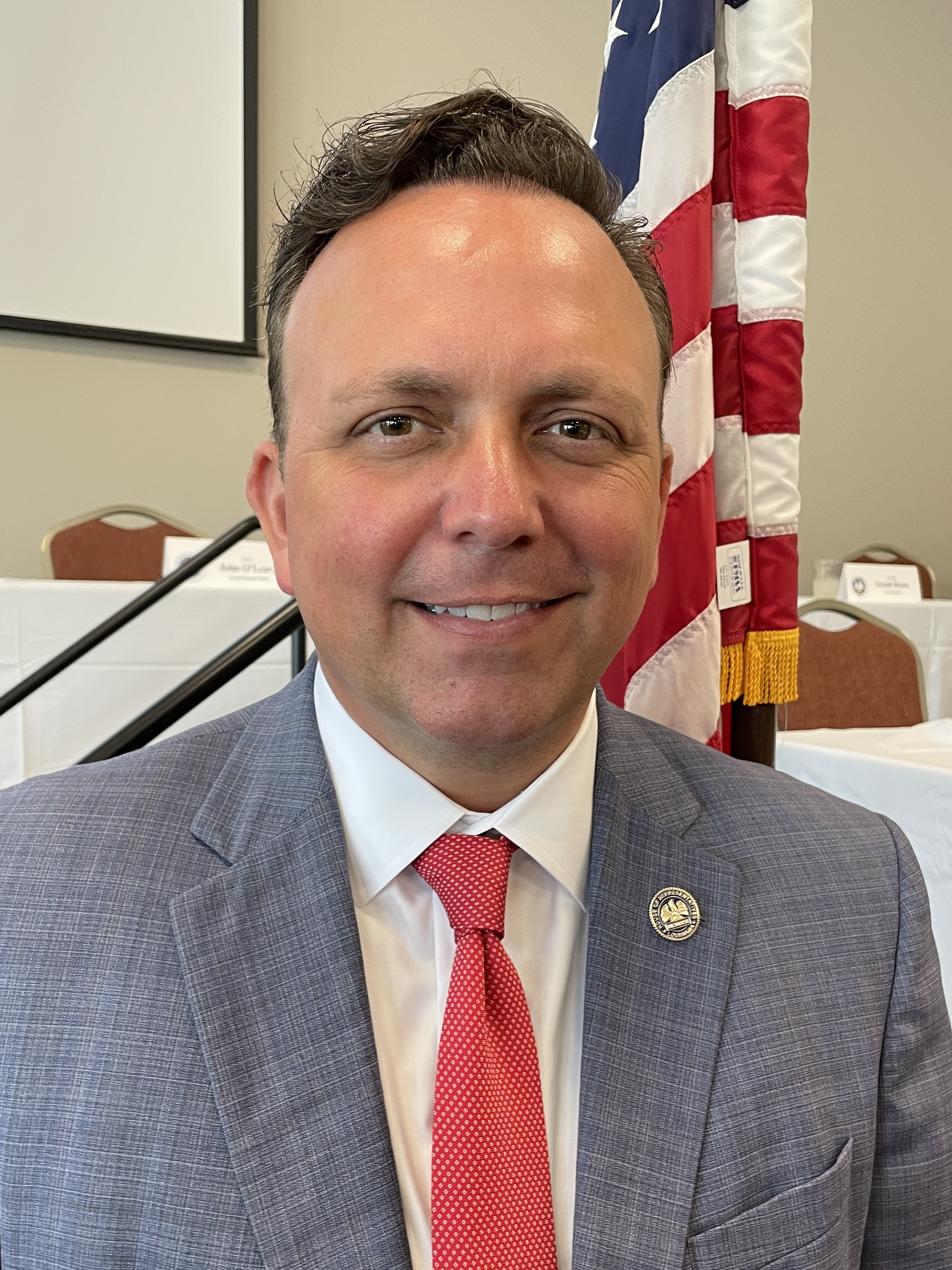

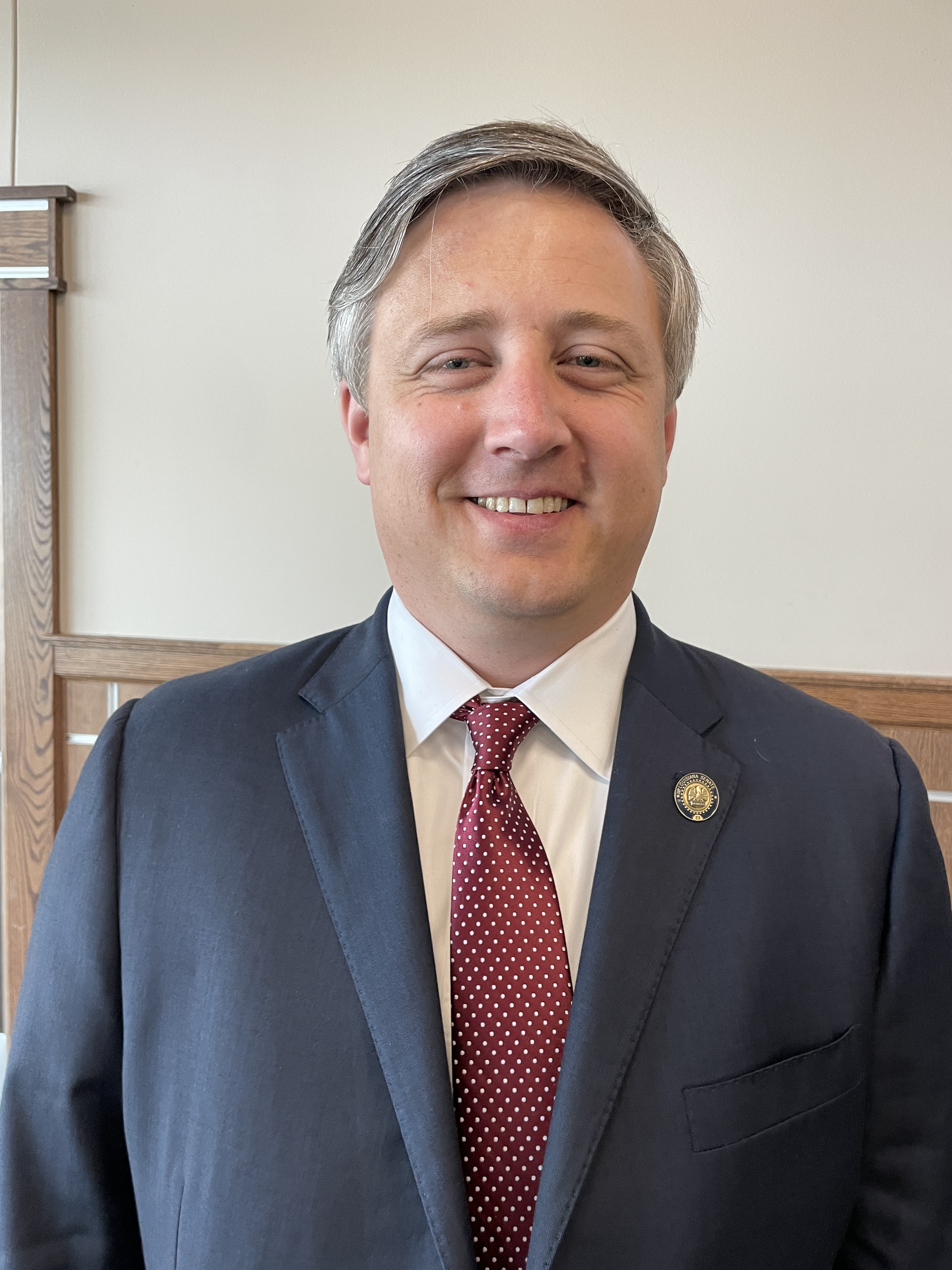

Nominee	Pat Moore	Gabe Firment	Misti Cordell
Party	Democratic	Republican	Republican
First round	40,796; 17.9%	39,131; 17.2%	33,381; 14.6%
Runoff	TBD	TBD	Eliminated
Nominee	Michael Echols	Stewart Cathey Jr.	Antonio Wilson
Party	Republican	Republican	Democratic
First round	32,915; 14.4%	28,173; 12.4%	27,378; 12.0%
Runoff	Eliminated	Eliminated	Eliminated
Nominee	Dan McKay
Party	Democratic
First round	16,056; 7.0%
Runoff	Eliminated
U.S. Representative before election
Julia Letlow
Republican
Elected U.S. Representative
TBD

Louisiana's 5th congressional district boundary from the 2026 elections Interactive map version

The 5th district encompasses rural northeastern Louisiana, central Louisiana, as well as the northern part of Louisiana's Florida parishes in southeast Louisiana, taking in Monroe, Amite and Bogalusa, Louisiana. The incumbent is Republican Julia Letlow, who was re-elected with 62.9% of the vote in 2024. On January 20, 2026, Letlow announced that she would run for the U.S. Senate in 2026.

=== Candidates ===
==== Declared ====
- Stewart Cathey Jr. (Republican), state senator from the 33rd district (2020–present)
- Misti Cordell (Republican), member of the Louisiana Board of Regents
- Oscar "Omar" Dantzler (Republican), former policeman and bail bondsman, Democratic candidate for this district in 2022, and candidate for governor in 2019
- Michael Echols (Republican), Louisiana State House majority leader from the 14th district (2019–present)
- Gabe Firment (Republican), state representative from the 22nd district (2020–present)
- Austin Magee (Republican), industrial contracting company owner
- Dan McKay (Democratic), attorney
- Patricia "Pat" Moore (Democratic), state representative from the 17th district (2019–present)
- Antonio Wilson (Democratic), community activist

==== Withdrawn ====
- Rick Edmonds (Republican), state senator from the 6th district (2024–present) (running in the 6th district)
- Jessee Fleenor (Democratic), farmer and candidate for this district in 2018
- Larry Foy (Democratic), religious scholar
- Lindsay Garcia (Democratic), activist (running in the 6th district)
- Dixon McMakin (Republican) state representative from the 68th district (2024–present)
- Michael Mebruer (Republican), traveling medical worker (running in the 6th district)
- Blake Miguez (Republican), state senator from the 22nd district (2024–present) (previously ran for U.S. Senate; running in the 6th district)
- Tania Nyman (Democratic), community advocate
- Ray Smith (Republican), veteran and former Jefferson Parish Sheriff's Office employee
- Sammy Wyatt (Republican), healthcare professional (previously ran for U.S. Senate; endorsed Cordell)

==== Declined ====
- Daryl Deshotel (Republican), state representative from the 28th district (2020–present)
- Garret Graves (Republican), former U.S. representative from the 6th district (2015–2025)
- Julia Letlow (Republican), incumbent U.S. representative (running for U.S. Senate)

=== General election ===
==== Predictions ====
Source	Ranking	As of
Decision Desk HQ	Safe R	July 14, 2026
The Cook Political Report	Solid R	March 13, 2025
Inside Elections	Solid R	March 7, 2025
Sabato's Crystal Ball	Safe R	July 15, 2025

==== Endorsements ====
Misti Cordell (R)

Political parties

- Republican Party of Louisiana
Michael Echols (R)

U.S. representatives

- Jim Jordan, OH-04 (2007–present)
Lindsay Garcia (D)

Organizations

- National Women's Political Caucus
Blake Miguez (R) (running in the 6th district)

Executive branch officials

- Donald Trump, president of the United States (2017–2021, 2025–present)

U.S. representatives

- Jim Jordan, OH-04 (2007–present)
- David McIntosh, former IN-02 (1995–2001)

Organizations

- Club for Growth

==== Fundraising ====
Italics indicate a withdrawn candidate.

Campaign finance reports as of October 14, 2026
Candidate	Raised	Spent	Cash on hand
Stewart Cathey Jr. (R)	$245,550	$147,771	$97,779
Misti Cordell (R)	$658,608	$458,430	$200,178
Michael Echols (R)	$3,188,840	$2,299,888	$888,952
Gabe Firment (R)	$453,882	$390,613	$63,269
Austin Magee (R)	$11,302	$11,243	$59
Dan McKay (D)	$121,182	$116,184	$4,998
Patricia Moore (D)	$22,129	$9,328	$12,800
Tania Nyman (D)	$33,123	$21,019	$12,103
Antonia Wilson (D)	$71,047	$39,997	$31,051
Sammy Wyatt (R)	$299,615	$299,615	$0
Source: Federal Election Commission

==== Debate ====
2026 Louisiana's 5th congressional district debate
No.	Date	Host	Moderator	Link	Republican	Republican	Republican	Republican	Democratic	Democratic
Key: P Participant A Absent N Not invited I Invited W Withdrawn										
Key: P Participant A Absent N Not invited I Invited W Withdrawn					Stewart Cathey Jr.	Misti Cordell	Michael Echols	Gabe Firment	Dan McKay	Patricia Moore
1	September 21, 2026	PAR Louisiana	Steven Procopio; Melinda Deslatte	Youtube	P	P	P	P	P	P

==== Polling ====
Hypothetical polling

Poll source	Date(s) administered	Sample size (Note: Key: A – all adults RV – registered voters LV – likely voters V – unclear)	Margin of error	Misti Cordell	Michael Echols	Rick Edmonds	Blake Miguez	Undecided
Bedrock Polling (Note: Poll sponsored by the Rainey Center Freedom Project)	April 4–7, 2026	889 (LV)	± 3.6%	3%	20%	10%	23%	42%

==== Results ====
Patricia Moore (D) and Gabe Firment (R) will face each other in a runoff on December 12, 2026.

2026 Louisiana's 5th congressional district election
Party	Candidate	Votes	%
Democratic	Patricia Moore	40,796	17.9
Republican	Gabe Firment	39,131	17.2
Republican	Misti Cordell	33,381	14.6
Republican	Michael Echols	32,915	14.4
Republican	Stewart Cathey Jr.	28,173	12.4
Democratic	Antonio Wilson	27,378	12.0
Democratic	Dan McKay	16,056	7.0
Republican	Austin Magee	7,920	3.5
Republican	Oscar Dantzler	2,238	1.0
Total votes		227,988	100

=== Runoff ===
==== Results ====
2026 Louisiana's 5th congressional district election runoff
Party	Candidate	Votes	%
Democratic	Patricia Moore		
Republican	Gabe Firment		
Total votes			

== District 6 ==
2026 Louisiana's 6th congressional district election
- November 3, 2026; December 12, 2026 (runoff)

Nominee	Chauna Banks	Blake Miguez	Rick Edmonds
Party	Democratic	Republican	Republican
First round	50,882; 19.4%	50,214; 19.2%	49,242; 18.8%
Runoff	TBD	TBD	Eliminated
Nominee	Rubia Garcia	Stephen Wagley	Pat Forbes
Party	Democratic	Republican	Democratic
First round	33,544; 12.8%	28,169; 10.8%	23,822; 9.1%
Runoff	Eliminated	Eliminated	Eliminated
U.S. Representative before election
Cleo Fields
Democratic
Elected U.S. Representative
TBD

Louisiana's 6th congressional district boundary from the 2026 elections Interactive map version

The 6th district encompasses much of Baton Rouge, Shreveport, and Lafayette. The incumbent, Democrat Cleo Fields, was elected with 50.8% of the vote in 2024.

=== Candidates ===
==== Declared ====
- Monique Appeaning (Republican), candidate for Louisiana's 66th House of Representatives district in 2023
- Chauna Banks (Democratic), former East Baton Rouge Parish Metro Councilor
- Rufus Craig (Libertarian), attorney
- Larry Davis (Republican), Livingston Parish Republican Executive committee member
- Rick Edmonds (Republican), state senator from the 6th district (2024–present)
- Pat Forbes (Democratic), engineer
- Lindsay Garcia (Democratic), activist
- Michael Mebruer (Republican), traveling medical worker
- Blake Miguez (Republican), state senator from the 22nd district (previously ran for the 5th district)
- Stephen Wagley (Republican), businessman

==== Withdrawn ====
- Cleo Fields (Democratic), incumbent U.S. representative (running for state senate)
- Chris Johnson (Republican)

=== General election ===
==== Predictions ====
Source	Ranking	As of
Decision Desk HQ	Safe R (flip)	July 14, 2026
The Cook Political Report	Solid R (flip)	June 1, 2026
Inside Elections	Solid R (flip)	June 11, 2026
Sabato's Crystal Ball	Safe R (flip)	June 3, 2026

==== Endorsements ====
Pat Forbes (D)

Executive branch officials

- Marcia Fudge, former secretary of housing and urban development (2021–2024)
- Mitch Landrieu, former senior advisor to the president (2021–2024)

U.S. senators

- Mary Landrieu, former United States Senator of Louisiana (1997–2015)

Statewide officials

- John Bel Edwards, former governor of Louisiana (2016–2024)
Lindsay Garcia (D)

Political parties

- Louisiana Democratic Party
Rick Edmonds (R)

Political parties

- Republican Party of Louisiana (co-endorsement with Miguez)
Blake Miguez (R)

U.S. representatives

- David McIntosh, former IN-2 (1995–2001)

Organizations

- Club for Growth PAC
- NRA Political Victory Fund

Political parties

- Republican Party of Louisiana (co-endorsement with Edmonds)
Cleo Fields (D) (withdrawn)

Organizations

- Planned Parenthood Action Fund
- Southern Poverty Law Center

==== Fundraising ====
Campaign finance reports as of October 14, 2026
Candidate	Raised	Spent	Cash on hand
Monique Appeaning (R)	$109,183	$94,474	$14,709
Larry Davis III (R)	$33,216	$31,397	$809
Rick Edmonds (R)	$697,139	$562,504	$134,635
Cleo Fields (D)	$851,920	$484,259	$239,444
Lindsay Garcia (D)	$97,007	$75,353	$21,654
Pat Forbes (D)	$156,334	$58,934	$97,400
Michael Mebruer (R)	$70,714	$55,630	$10,987
Blake Miguez (R)	$7,749,606	$6,215,093	$1,534,513
Stephen Wagley (R)	$874,344	$678,710	$195,633
Source: Federal Election Commission

==== Polling ====
Poll source	Date(s) administered	Sample size	Margin of error	Chauna Banks (D)	Larry Davis (R)	Rick Edmonds (R)	Pat Forbes (D)	Blake Miguez (R)	Others	Undecided
Greg Rigamer	August 12–13, 2026	500 (RV)	± 4.4%	19%	6%	16%	8%	9%	1%	40%

==== Results ====
2026 Louisiana's 6th congressional district election
Party	Candidate	Votes	%
Democratic	Chauna Banks	50,882	19.4
Republican	Blake Miguez	50,214	19.2
Republican	Rick Edmonds	49,242	18.8
Democratic	Lindsay Garcia	33,544	12.8
Republican	Stephen Wagley	28,169	10.8
Democratic	Pat Forbes	23,822	9.1
Republican	Larry Davis	11,359	4.3
Republican	Monique Appeaning	8,110	3.1
Libertarian	Rufus Craig	3,461	1.3
Republican	Michael Mebruer	3,160	1.2
Total votes		261,963	100

=== Runoff ===
==== Results ====
2026 Louisiana's 6th congressional district runoff election
Party	Candidate	Votes	%
Democratic	Chauna Banks		
Republican	Blake Miguez		
Total votes			

== Notes ==
Partisan clients
