= Louisiana's 66th House of Representatives district =

American legislative district

Louisiana's 66th State House of Representatives district
Representative
Emily Chenevert; R–Baton Rouge

Louisiana's 66th House of Representatives district is one of 105 Louisiana House of Representatives districts. It is currently represented by Republican Emily Chenevert of Baton Rouge.

== Geography ==
HD66 includes part of the Baton Rouge metropolitan area, including a small part of its city and part of the city of Saint George.

== Election results ==
Year	Winning candidate	Party	Percent	Opponent	Party	Percent	Opponent	Party	Percent
2011	Hunter Greene	Republican	100%						
2015 - Special	Darrell Ourso	Republican	50.9%	Buddy Amoroso	Republican	49.1%			
2015	Rick Edmonds	Republican	52.1%	Darrell Ourso	Republican	47.9%			
2019	Rick Edmonds	Republican	69.6%	Morgan Lamandre	Democratic	26.9%	David Smith	Libertarian	3.5%
2023	Emily Chenevert	Republican	60%	Richie Edmonds	Republican	40%			
