= Chênevert =

Chenevert or Chênevert is a French surname. It is a topographic surname derived from the French words 'chêne' (oak) and 'vert' (green).

Notable people with the surname include:

- Cuthbert-Alphonse Chênevert (1859–1920), Canadian politician
- Emily Chenevert, American politician
- Louis R. Chênevert (born 1958), Canadian businessman
