= 2026 Jeff Landry recall effort =

2026 campaign to recall Jeff Landry

The 2026 Jeff Landry recall effort was an unsuccessful campaign seeking to remove Louisiana governor Jeff Landry from office through a recall election. Baton Rouge residents Marian Gbaiwon Hills and Katilyn P. Stepter filed a statewide recall petition with the Louisiana Secretary of State on May 4, 2026. The petition covered all 64 parishes in Louisiana.

To qualify for a recall election, organizers needed at least 500,884 valid signatures, representing 20 percent of the 2,504,416 active registered voters recorded when the petition was filed. According to the campaign's organizers, the effort ended on October 31, 2026, without enough signatures to proceed to an election.

== Background ==
On April 29, 2026, the U.S. Supreme Court ruled in Louisiana v. Callais that Louisiana had relied too heavily on race when drawing a second majority-Black congressional district. The ruling invalidated the congressional map being used for the 2026 election.

The following day, Landry issued an executive order suspending the May 16 party primaries for Louisiana's six seats in the United States House of Representatives. Other races on the ballot continued as scheduled. Landry said the suspension would allow the Louisiana State Legislature to enact a new congressional map following the court's decision. The recall petition was filed four days after the suspension.

== Petition filing ==
Hills was the campaign's chair and Stepter its vice chair. The petition accused Landry of a pattern of actions and statements that the petitioners said undermined fair representation, shifted government priorities away from community needs and favored punishment over policies addressing underlying social problems.

According to Louisiana Secretary of State records cited by Unfiltered with Kiran, no recall effort against a Louisiana statewide elected official had qualified for a recall election since the state's available records began in 1966. Previous unsuccessful recall efforts targeted governors Kathleen Blanco, Bobby Jindal and John Bel Edwards.

The campaign was conducted under the name Louisiana Deserves Better. The group also supported a separate recall petition against Louisiana Attorney General Liz Murrill, and several signature drives collected signatures for both petitions.

== Recall procedure ==
Louisiana law required a petition concerning a voting area with at least 100,000 qualified electors to be signed by at least 20 percent of the electors in that area. Each signature had to be handwritten. Signers also had to provide an address and the date on which the petition was signed.

Signed petition pages had to be submitted to the registrar of voters in each parish within 180 days after the petition was filed with the secretary of state. Submission deadlines falling on a Saturday, Sunday or legal holiday were extended to the next day that was not a Saturday, Sunday or legal holiday. The campaign had to submit original documents rather than photocopies and provide an affidavit stating the number of signatures submitted.

Each parish registrar was responsible for determining which signers were qualified electors and certifying the number of valid signatures. State law generally allowed 20 working days for certification, or 30 working days for every parish in a recall area that included a parish with more than 50,000 registered voters. Additional time was allowed when certification overlapped with an election period.

Because the governor was the official named in the petition, the secretary of state was responsible for duties that would otherwise have been assigned to the governor during the recall process. Had the registrars certified the required number of signatures, the secretary of state would have had 15 days to issue a proclamation placing the recall question on an available election date.

A majority of the votes cast would have determined the result of a recall election. If a majority had voted for removal, Landry would have left office after the period for contesting the result expired or, if the result had been challenged, after a final judgment. Under the Constitution of Louisiana, the elected lieutenant governor was first in the order of succession and would have served the remainder of the gubernatorial term.

== Signature campaign ==
Public signature drives were held in several regions of Louisiana after the filing. On May 11, supporters gathered at Government Plaza in downtown Shreveport.

More than 200 people attended a May 14 drive at Lafayette City Hall for the Landry and Murrill petitions. The Lafayette Parish Democratic Party Executive Committee organized the event in coordination with Hills and Stepter. Volunteers reviewed the petition forms as they were completed to identify errors that could cause signatures to be rejected.

Hundreds of people waited in line for a May 15 signing event on Drusilla Lane in Baton Rouge. WAFB reported that the line extended around a fence, through a parking lot and up stairs to the office where the petition was available. Some participants cited congressional redistricting and Louisiana's shift to closed-party primaries as reasons for signing. Organizers did not provide WAFB with a cumulative signature count.

A drive was held May 30 at Bringhurst City Park in Alexandria. KALB reported that organizers said several hundred people attended during the seven-hour event. Local organizer Erin Tracy said participants had cited issues including carbon capture projects, data centers, redistricting and election policy.

By June 2, campaign leaders had declined requests from KALB to release the number of signatures collected statewide.

Organizers began collecting signatures in Monroe and Ruston on June 9. Those locations collected signatures for the recall petitions against both Landry and Murrill.

On June 9, a signature drive was held in Tallulah.

=== Internal disputes ===
In August, Verite News reported that, according to former parish leaders and volunteers, more than 100 organizers and volunteers, including Stepter, had left the campaign, reduced their involvement or been removed following disputes over leadership and financial transparency. Some former parish leaders formed a separate group, Better Together, and continued collecting signatures.

Hills told Verite News that some participants had left voluntarily, while others had been suspended or removed over their conduct, and that she remained focused on completing the recall. Stepter said she had distanced herself from the organization to focus on her personal circumstances, although she remained its vice chair.

== Opposition ==
The Republican Party of Louisiana launched a social media countercampaign titled "Don't You Recall?" in response to the petitions against Landry and Murrill. The party promoted what it described as accomplishments involving public safety, education, taxes and economic development.

Louisiana Republican Party executive director Cory Dennis opposed the recalls, arguing that Landry and Murrill were carrying out the policies on which they had been elected. Dennis cited employment, crime and education statistics that he said demonstrated progress during their terms.

== Outcome ==
Louisiana Deserves Better stated that the recall campaigns against Landry and Murrill ended on October 31, 2026, after failing to reach the signature requirement. In a closing message on the campaign's website, Hills acknowledged the shortfall and said supporters would focus on future elections.

== See also ==
2026 United States House of Representatives elections in Louisiana
