= Louisiana's 17th House of Representatives district =

American legislative district

Louisiana's 17th State House of Representatives district
Representative
Pat Moore; D–Monroe

Louisiana's 17th House of Representatives district is one of 105 Louisiana House of Representatives districts. It is currently represented by Democrat Pat Moore of Monroe.

== Geography ==
HD17 includes the communities of Richwood and Brownsville. Additionally, the district includes parts of the cities of Monroe and West Monroe.

== Election results ==
Year	Winning candidate	Party	Percent	Opponent	Party	Percent	Opponent	Party	Percent
2011 (Note: Hunter: 1,984 - Burns: 1,981.)	Marcus Hunter	Democratic	50%	Billy Burns	Democratic	50%			
2015	Marcus Hunter	Democratic	62%	Heath Albritton	Republican	21.4%	Goree Burns	Democratic	16.7%
2019 - Special	Pat Moore	Democratic	63.2%	Rodney McFarland Sr.	Democratic	36.8%			
2019	Pat Moore	Democratic	100%						
2023	Pat Moore	Democratic	Cancelled						
