= Ourso =

Ourso is a surname, a spelling variant of Urso under French influence. Notable people with the surname include:

- Darrell Ourso
- Jessel Ourso
