= Greg LaFleur =

American football player (born 1958)

No. 89, 83
- Position: Tight end

Personal information
- Born: September 16, 1958 (age 68); Ville Platte, Louisiana, U.S.
- Listed height: 6 ft 4 in (1.93 m)
- Listed weight: 236 lb (107 kg)

Career information
- High school: Ville Platte (LA)
- College: LSU
- NFL draft: 1981: 3rd round, 82nd overall pick

Career history
- Philadelphia Eagles (1981)*; St. Louis Cardinals (1981–1986); Indianapolis Colts (1986); San Francisco 49ers (1987)*; Detroit Lions (1987)*
- * Offseason or practice squad member only

Awards and highlights
- PFWA All-Rookie Team (1981)

Career NFL statistics
- Receptions: 64
- Receiving yards: 729
- Receiving touchdowns: 3
- Stats at Pro Football Reference

Gregory Louis LaFleur (born September 16, 1958) is an American former professional football player who was a tight end in the National Football League (NFL). LaFleur was selected 82nd overall in the third round by the Philadelphia Eagles out of Louisiana State University in the 1981 NFL draft. LaFleur was also a member of the Indianapolis Colts and St. Louis Cardinals. He had career statistics of 64 Receptions and 3 Touchdowns. He is the father of former NBA center Robert Sacre. His youngest son Greyson LaFleur is a senior linebacker at Southern University.

In 1995 he served as the national spokesperson for the Kennedy Center Alliance for Arts Education. LaFleur was the athletic director at Texas State University from 2001 to 2004 and Chicago State University from 2004 to 2005. He was the athletic director at Southern University from 2005 until April 6, 2011. In 2016, LaFleur ran for mayor-president of Baton Rouge and the East Baton Rouge Parish.
