= Bodi White =

American politician and businessman (born 1956)

Member of the Louisiana Senate from the 6th district
- In office January 2012 – January 2024
- Preceded by: Julie Quinn
- Succeeded by: Rick Edmonds

Member of the Louisiana House of Representatives from the 64th district
- In office 2004–2012
- Preceded by: Tony Perkins
- Succeeded by: Valarie Hodges

Personal details
- Party: Republican
- Spouse: Robin Wunstel White
- Children: 3
- Education: Southeastern Louisiana University (BA); Loyola University New Orleans
- Occupation: Realtor

Mack A. "Bodi" White, Jr. (born April 7, 1956) is an American politician from Louisiana who represented District 6 in the Louisiana State Senate from 2012 to 2024. A Republican, White previously served in the Louisiana House of Representatives for District 64 between 2004 and 2012.

== Electoral history ==
White was first elected to the Louisiana House of Representatives in 2003, succeeding Tony Perkins. In 2011, White successfully ran for the Louisiana State Senate's 6th district, narrowly defeating Exxon executive Mike Mannino in the first round.

In 2016, White ran for East Baton Rouge Parish mayor-president, but lost in the runoff election to Democrat Sharon Weston Broome.

Louisiana State Senate
Preceded by Julie Quinn	Louisiana State Senator from District 6 (East Baton Rouge, Livingston, St. Helena, and Tangipahoa parishes); Mack A. "Bodi" White, Jr. 2012–2024	Succeeded by Rick Edmonds
Louisiana House of Representatives
Preceded by Tony Perkins	Louisiana State Representative from District 64 (East Baton Rouge and Livingston parishes); Mack A. "Bodi" White, Jr. 2004–2012	Succeeded by Valarie Hodges
