= 2016 Baton Rouge mayoral election =

- November 8, 2016 (first round); December 10, 2016 (runoff)
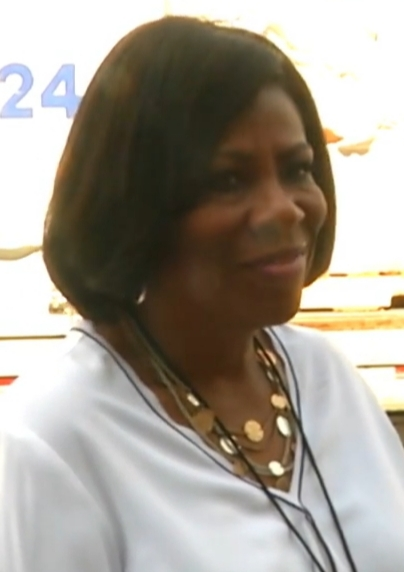

Candidate	Sharon Weston Broome	Bodi White	C. Denise Marcelle
Party	Democratic	Republican	Democratic
First round	60,368; 31.62%	56,059; 29.36%	25,477; 13.34%
Runoff	59,637; 51.83%	55,421; 48.17%	Eliminated
Candidate	John Delgado	R. J. "Smokie" Bourgeois	Darryl Gissel
Party	Republican	Republican	Independent
First round	16,049; 8.41%	11,710; 6.13%	11,228; 5.88%
Runoff	Eliminated	Eliminated	Eliminated
Mayor before election
Kip Holden
Democratic
Elected mayor
Sharon Weston Broome
Democratic

The 2016 Baton Rouge mayoral election was held on November 8 and December 10, 2016, to elect the mayor-president of Baton Rouge, Louisiana.

== Results ==
=== First round ===
First round
Party	Candidate	Votes	%
Democratic	Sharon Weston Broome	60,368	31.62
Republican	Bodi White	56,059	29.36
Democratic	C. Denise Marcelle	25,477	13.34
Republican	John Delgado	16,049	8.41
Republican	R. J. "Smokie" Bourgeois	11,710	6.13
Independent	Darryl Gissel	11,228	5.88
Democratic	Greg LaFleur	3,498	1.83
Democratic	Byron Sharper	2,484	1.3
Libertarian	Rufus Craig	2,002	1.05
Other	Beverly Amador	843	0.44
Republican	Braylon Hyde	805	0.42
Other	Cade Williams	410	0.21
Total votes		190,933	

=== Runoff ===
Runoff results
Party	Candidate	Votes	%
Democratic	Sharon Weston Broome	59,637	51.83
Republican	Bodi White	55,421	48.17
Total votes		115,058	
