= Pat Moore (Louisiana politician) =

American politician

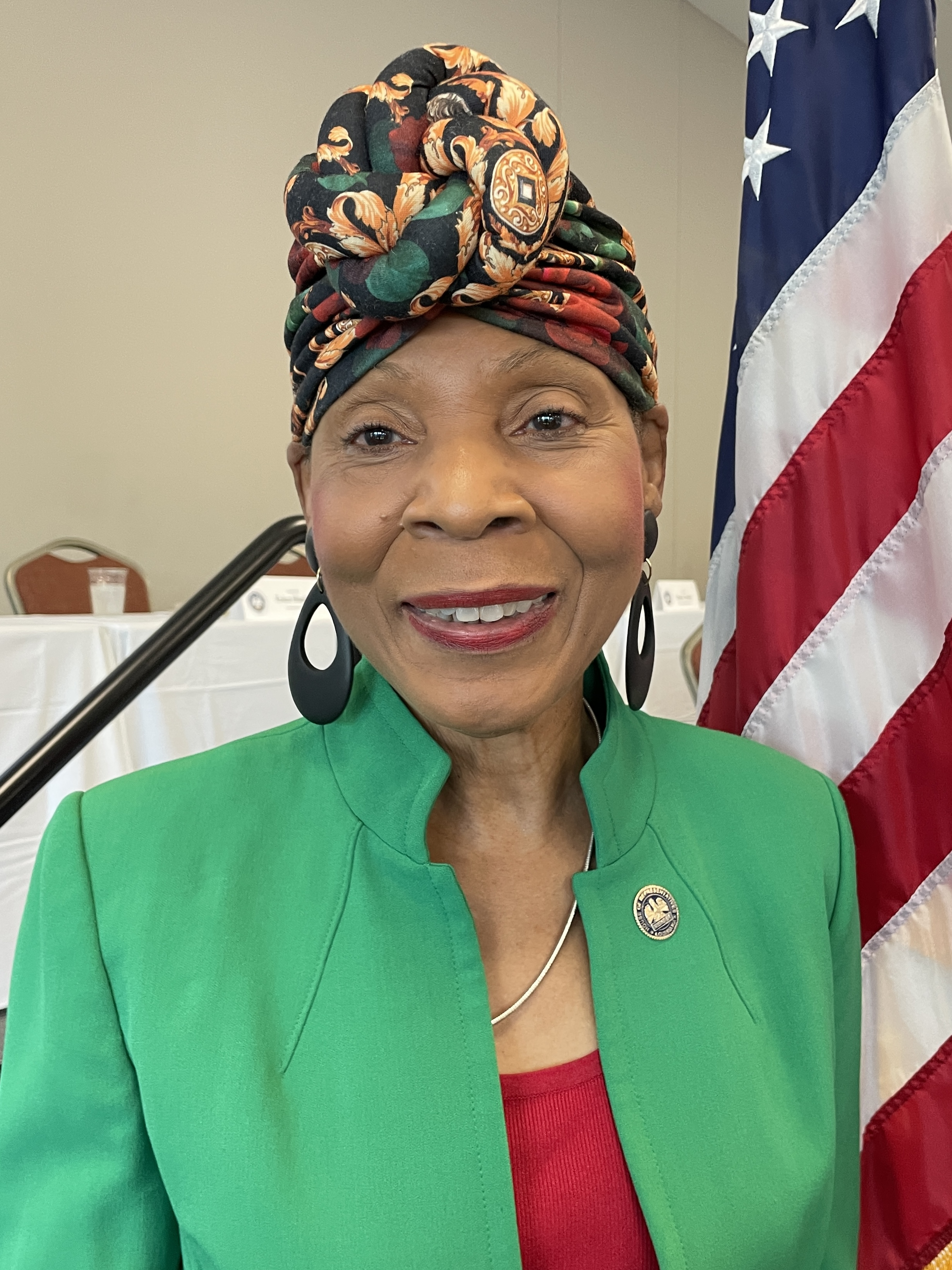
- Moore in 2026

Member of the Louisiana House of Representatives from the 17th district
- Incumbent
- Assumed office April 8, 2019
- Preceded by: Marcus Hunter

Personal details
- Born: March 8, 1958 (age 68)
- Party: Democratic
- Education: University of Louisiana, Monroe (BBA)

Patricia Ann Thomas Moore (born March 8, 1958) is an American politician who has represented the 17th district in the Louisiana House of Representatives since 2019. A member of the Democratic Party, she represents parts of Ouachita Parish. She previously served on the Ouachita Parish Police Jury from 2007 to 2019.

== Background ==
Patricia Ann Thomas Moore was born on March 8, 1958 and is from Monroe, Louisiana. She attended Wossman High School and earned a bachelor's degree in business administration from Northeast Louisiana University, now the University of Louisiana at Monroe. She worked for State Farm before retiring.

== Political career ==
Moore served on the Ouachita Parish Police Jury from 2007 to 2019, representing District F.

=== Louisiana House of Representatives ===
==== Elections ====
Moore ran in a 2019 special election to succeed Marcus Hunter, who had been elected to Louisiana's Fourth Judicial District Court. She defeated Rodney McFarland in the March 30 runoff, receiving 2,406 votes, or 63.2%, to McFarland's 1,398 votes. She was sworn into office on April 8, 2019.

Moore was reelected without opposition in the regular elections in 2019 and 2023.

==== Tenure ====
As of 2026, Moore's committee assignments include Administration of Criminal Justice; Municipal, Parochial and Cultural Affairs; Transportation, Highways and Public Works; and the House select committees on Disaster Recovery and Women and Children.

In 2023, Moore authored House Bill 587, which became Act 182. The law established the Louisiana Community Health Worker Workforce Board within the Louisiana Department of Health to develop recommendations on community health worker training, competencies and financing.

In 2024, Moore authored House Bill 83, which became Act 365. The law required commercial body art facilities to disclose the regulatory status of tattoo ink on consent forms and required state rules on disclosure of health risks associated with body art.

On April 16, 2024, Moore voted to advance House Bill 545 from the Administration of Criminal Justice Committee. Sponsored by Beryl Amedee, the bill would have removed public school libraries' exemption from the state's obscenity law. It did not receive final House passage.

In 2025, Moore introduced House Bill 76, which, as amended, would have made intentionally transmitting an incurable sexually transmitted infection a felony. Moore said the proposal would provide recourse for people infected without their knowledge. Public health advocates opposed the bill, arguing that criminalization could discourage testing and increase stigma. The House passed the bill on June 2 by a vote of 68–18, but it did not advance beyond the Senate Judiciary C Committee.

Moore has opposed adding rape and incest exceptions to Louisiana's abortion ban and supported restrictions on transgender participation in school sports.

=== 2026 congressional campaign ===
On August 7, 2026, Moore qualified to run for the United States House of Representatives in Louisiana's 5th congressional district. Her campaign emphasized early childhood education, economic opportunity and access to health care.
