= Rick Edmonds =

American pastor and politician

Member of the Louisiana State Senate from the 6th district
- Incumbent
- Assumed office January 8, 2024
- Preceded by: Bodi White

Member of the Louisiana House of Representatives from the 66th district
- In office January 11, 2016 – January 8, 2024
- Preceded by: Darrell Ourso
- Succeeded by: Emily Chenevert

Personal details
- Born: Richard Phillip Edmonds Jr. September 12, 1956 (age 69) Shreveport, Louisiana, U.S.
- Party: Republican
- Education: East Texas Baptist University (BA); New Orleans Baptist Theological Seminary (MDiv)

Richard Phillip Edmonds Jr. (born September 12, 1956), is an American pastor and politician from the U.S. state of Louisiana. A Republican, he is a member of the Louisiana Senate from East Baton Rouge Parish. He previously served in the Louisiana House of Representatives.

== Career ==
Edmonds is a former pastor of the Calvary Baptist Church in Shreveport and a former figure in the Louisiana Family Forum. He lives in Baton Rouge and is currently Senior Pastor at First Baptist Church of McComb.

In the 2015 House election, Edmonds unseated a fellow Republican, the moderate Darrell Ourso.

Edmonds was among nine candidates running for secretary of state in the 2018 special election to fill the seat vacated by Tom Schedler. Edmonds finished in fourth place in the race with 164,949 (11 percent). In a runoff election in December, victory went to the Republican interim secretary Kyle Ardoin.

In the 2023 elections, with Bodi White prevented from running for reelection to the Louisiana State Senate due to term limits, Edmonds ran to succeed him as the state senator for the sixth district. He faced Barry Ivey, a fellow state representative, in the primary election. Edmonds defeated Ivey, receiving 62% of the vote.

After Julia Letlow announced that she would run for the U.S. Senate in the 2026 elections, Edmonds announced that he would run to succeed Letlow in the U.S. House of Representatives for Louisiana's 5th congressional district.
