= 2022 United States House of Representatives elections in Louisiana =

- November 8, 2022

All 6 Louisiana seats to the United States House of Representatives
	Majority party	Minority party
Party	Republican	Democratic
Last election	5	1
Seats won	5	1
Seat change	Steady	Steady
Popular vote	773,701	318,932
Percentage	68.28%	28.15%
Swing	▲6.73%	▼7.83%

Republican
50–60%
60–70%
70–80%
80–90%
90>%
Democratic
50–60%
70–80%
80–90%

The 2022 United States House of Representatives elections in Louisiana were held on November 8, 2022, to elect the six U.S. representatives from the state of Louisiana, one from each of the state's six congressional districts. The elections coincided with other elections to the House of Representatives, elections to the United States Senate and various state and local elections.

== Overview ==
Popular vote
Republican	68.28%
Democratic	28.15%
Other	3.57%

House seats
Republican	83.33%
Democratic	16.67%

== District 1 ==
2022 Louisiana's 1st congressional district election
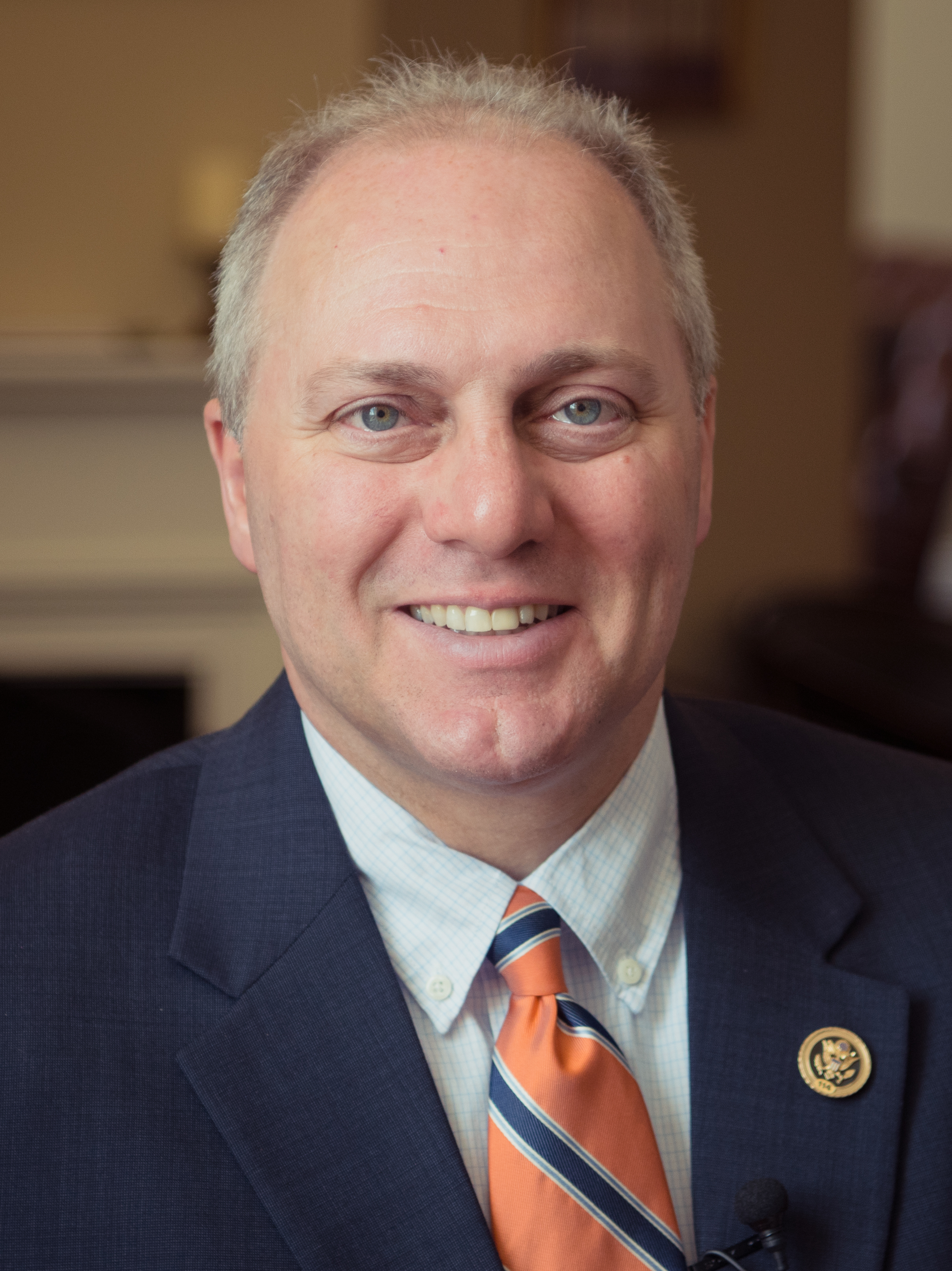

Candidate	Steve Scalise	Katie Darling
Party	Republican	Democratic
Popular vote	177,670	61,467
Percentage	72.8%	25.2%
- Scalise: 50–60% 60–70% 70–80% 80–90% >90% Darling: 40–50% 50–60% 60–70% 70–80% 80–90% Tie: 50% No votes
U.S. Representative before election
Steve Scalise
Republican
Elected U.S. Representative
Steve Scalise
Republican

The 1st district is based in the suburbs of New Orleans, spanning from the northern shore of Lake Pontchartrain south to the Mississippi River Delta. The incumbent was Republican Steve Scalise, who was re-elected with 72.2% of the vote in 2020.

=== Candidates ===
==== Declared ====
- Katie Darling (Democratic), businesswoman
- Howard Kearney (Libertarian), computer programmer and candidate for this district in 2016 and 2020
- Steve Scalise (Republican), incumbent U.S. representative and House minority whip

=== General election ===
==== Predictions ====
Source	Ranking	As of
The Cook Political Report	Solid R	March 31, 2022
Inside Elections	Solid R	May 24, 2022
Sabato's Crystal Ball	Safe R	April 6, 2022
Politico	Solid R	April 5, 2022
RCP	Safe R	June 9, 2022
Fox News	Solid R	July 11, 2022
DDHQ	Solid R	July 20, 2022
538	Solid R	June 30, 2022

=== Results ===
Louisiana's 1st congressional district, 2022
Party	Candidate	Votes	%
Republican	Steve Scalise (incumbent)	177,670	72.8
Democratic	Katie Darling	61,467	25.2
Libertarian	Howard Kearney	4,907	2.0
Total votes		244,044	100.0
Republican hold			

== District 2 ==
2022 Louisiana's 2nd congressional district election
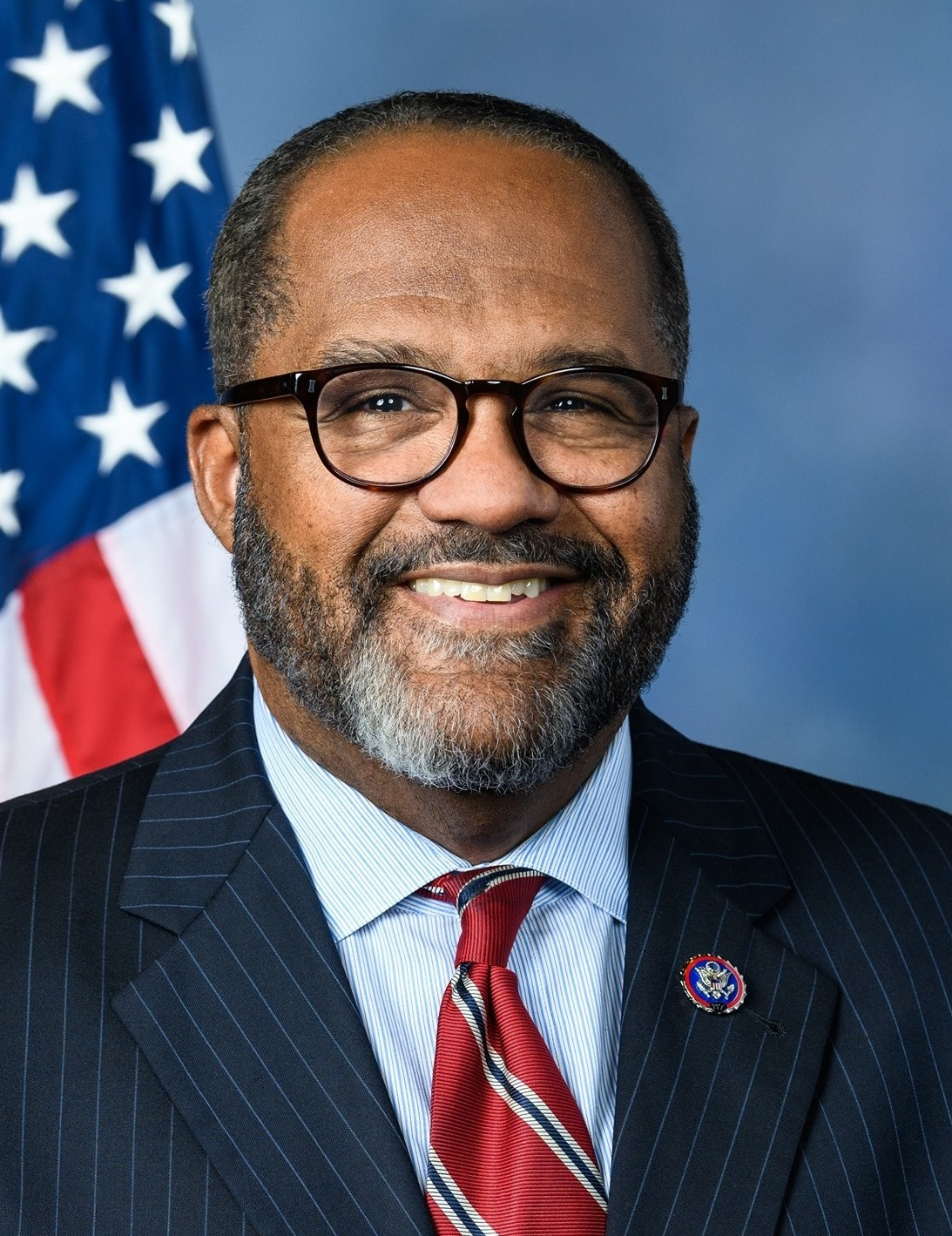

Candidate	Troy Carter	Dan Lux
Party	Democratic	Republican
Popular vote	158,120	46,927
Percentage	77.1%	22.9%
- Carter: 50–60% 60–70% 70–80% 80–90% >90% Lux: 50–60% 60–70% 70–80% 80–90% >90% No votes
U.S. Representative before election
Troy Carter
Democratic
Elected U.S. Representative
Troy Carter
Democratic

The 2nd district stretches from New Orleans to inner Baton Rouge. Democrat Cedric Richmond, who was re-elected with 63.6% of the vote in 2020, resigned on January 15, 2021, to become the director of the White House Office of Public Engagement. Democrat Troy Carter won the 2021 special election in a runoff with 55.2% of the vote.

=== Candidates ===
==== Declared ====
- Troy Carter (Democratic), incumbent U.S. representative
- Dan Lux (Republican), entertainment producer

=== Endorsements ===
Troy Carter (D)

Organizations

- Planned Parenthood Action Fund

=== General election ===
==== Predictions ====
Source	Ranking	As of
The Cook Political Report	Solid D	March 31, 2022
Inside Elections	Solid D	May 24, 2022
Sabato's Crystal Ball	Safe D	April 6, 2022
Politico	Solid D	April 5, 2022
RCP	Safe D	June 9, 2022
Fox News	Solid D	July 11, 2022
DDHQ	Solid D	July 20, 2022
538	Solid D	June 30, 2022

=== Results ===
Louisiana's 2nd congressional district, 2022
Party	Candidate	Votes	%
Democratic	Troy Carter (incumbent)	158,120	77.1
Republican	Dan Lux	46,927	22.9
Total votes		205,047	100.0
Democratic hold			

== District 3 ==
2022 Louisiana's 3rd congressional district election
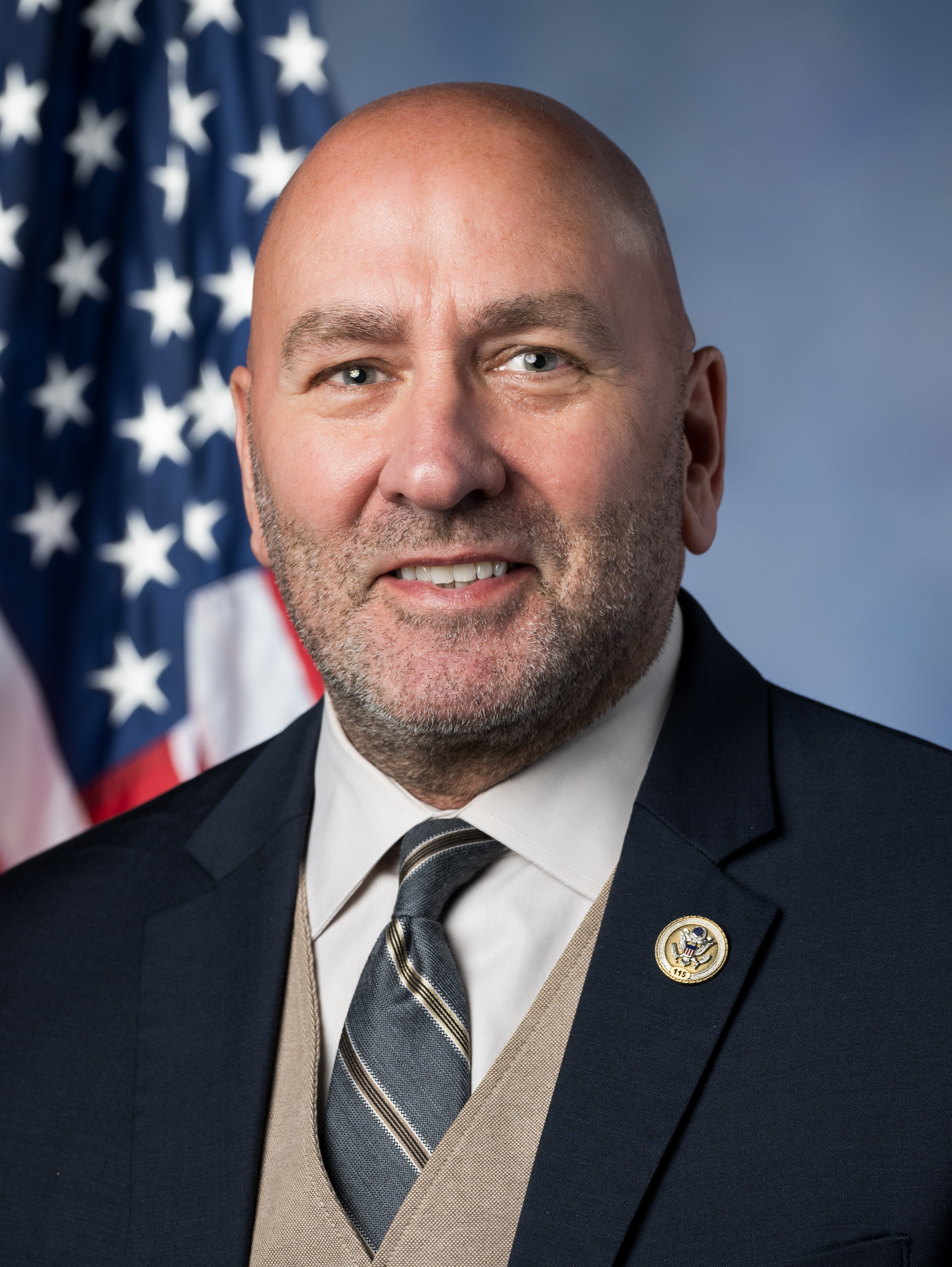

Candidate	Clay Higgins	Holden Hoggatt
Party	Republican	Republican
Popular vote	144,423	24,474
Percentage	64.3%	10.9%
Candidate	Lessie Olivia Leblanc	Tia LeBrun
Party	Democratic	Democratic
Popular vote	23,641	21,172
Percentage	10.5%	9.4%
- Higgins: 20–30% 30–40% 40–50% 50–60% 60–70% 70–80% 80–90% >90% Hoggatt: 30–40% >90% Leblanc: 20–30% 30–40% 40–50% 50–60% >90% LeBrun: 20–30% 30–40% 40–50% 50–60% Wiggins: 40–50% Tie: 20–30% 30–40% No votes
U.S. Representative before election
Clay Higgins
Republican
Elected U.S. Representative
Clay Higgins
Republican

The 3rd district encompasses southwestern Louisiana, taking in Lake Charles and Lafayette. The incumbent was Republican Clay Higgins, who was re-elected with 67.8% of the vote in 2020.

=== Candidates ===
==== Declared ====
- Clay Higgins (Republican), incumbent U.S. representative
- Holden Hoggatt (Republican), prosecutor
- Lessie Olivia Leblanc (Democratic), journalist
- Tia LeBrun (Democratic), teacher
- Guy McLendon (Libertarian), perennial candidate
- Thomas "Lane" Payne Jr. (Republican), pastor
- Jacob "Jake" Shaheen (Republican), teacher
- Gloria R. Wiggins (independent)

==== Withdrawn ====
- Dustin Granger (Democratic)

=== Endorsements ===
Clay Higgins (R)

Federal officials

- Donald Trump, former president of the United States

U.S. senators

- John Kennedy, U.S. senator from Louisiana

U.S. representatives

- Mike Johnson, U.S. representative for Louisiana's 4th congressional district
- Kevin McCarthy, House minority leader
- Steve Scalise, House minority whip

State officials

- Jeff Landry, attorney general of Louisiana
Holden Hoggatt (R)

U.S. senators

- John Breaux, former U.S. senator from Louisiana (1987–2005) (Democrat)

U.S. representatives

- Charles Boustany, former U.S. representative from Louisiana's 3rd congressional district (2005–2017)
- Chris John, former U.S. representative from Louisiana's 7th congressional district (1997–2005) (Democrat)

=== General election ===
==== Predictions ====
Source	Ranking	As of
The Cook Political Report	Solid R	March 31, 2022
Inside Elections	Solid R	May 24, 2022
Sabato's Crystal Ball	Safe R	April 6, 2022
Politico	Solid R	April 5, 2022
RCP	Safe R	June 9, 2022
Fox News	Solid R	July 11, 2022
DDHQ	Solid R	July 20, 2022
538	Solid R	June 30, 2022

=== Polling ===
Poll source	Date(s) administered	Sample size (Note: Key: A – all adults RV – registered voters LV – likely voters V – unclear)	Margin of error	Clay Higgins (R)	Holden Hoggatt (R)	Lessie LeBlanc (D)	Tia Lebrun (D)	Thomas Lane Payne (R)	Other	Undecided
The Kitchens Group (R) (Note: Poll sponsored by Hoggatt's campaign)	August 2022	400 (LV)	± 4.9%	29%	21%	7%	10%	4%	10%	19%

=== Results ===
Louisiana's 3rd congressional district, 2022
Party	Candidate	Votes	%
Republican	Clay Higgins (incumbent)	144,423	64.3
Republican	Holden Hoggatt	24,474	10.9
Democratic	Lessie Olivia Leblanc	23,641	10.5
Democratic	Tia LeBrun	21,172	9.4
Republican	Thomas "Lane" Payne, Jr.	4,012	1.8
Independent	Gloria R. Wiggins	3,255	1.4
Republican	Jacob "Jake" Shaheen	1,955	0.9
Libertarian	Guy McLendon	1,620	0.7
Total votes		224,552	100.0
Republican hold			

== District 4 ==
2022 Louisiana's 4th congressional district election
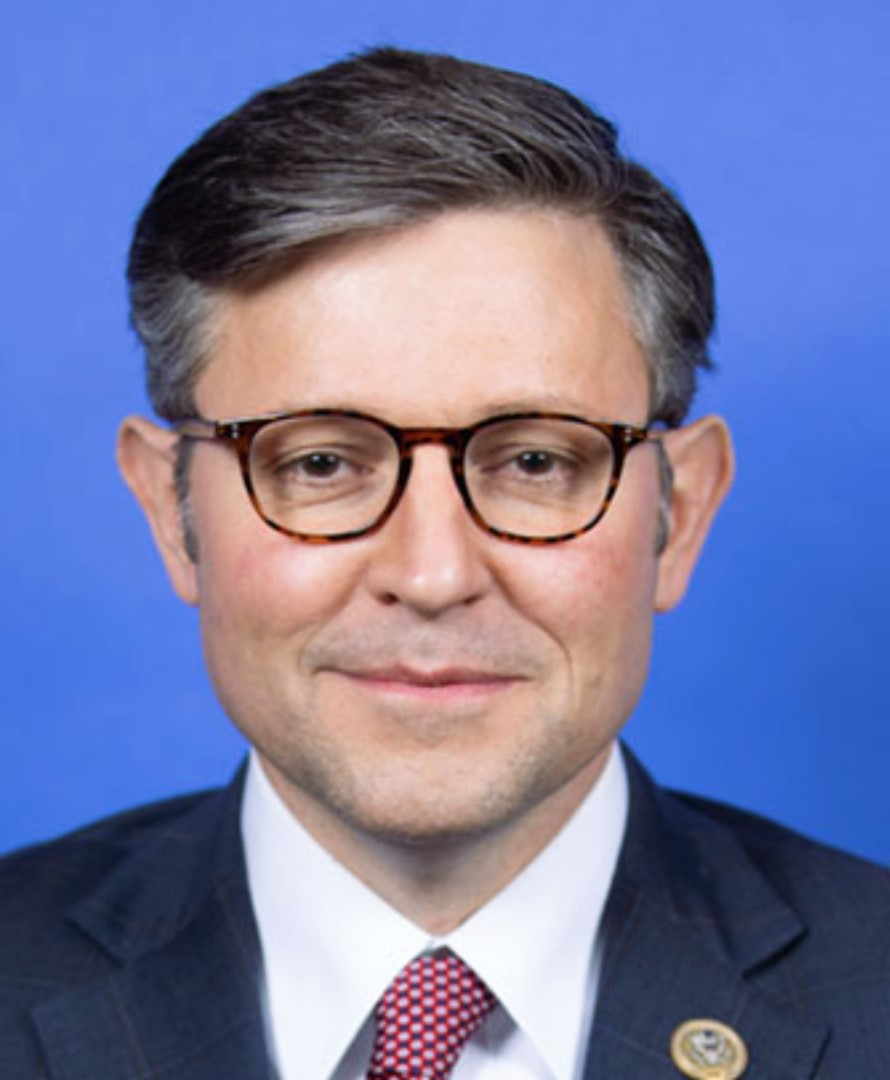
Candidate	Mike Johnson
Party	Republican
Popular vote	Unopposed
Percentage	100.0%
U.S. Representative before election
Mike Johnson
Republican
Elected U.S. Representative
Mike Johnson
Republican

The 4th district encompasses northwestern Louisiana, taking in the Shreveport–Bossier City metropolitan area. The incumbent was Republican Mike Johnson, who was re-elected with 60.4% of the vote in 2020.

=== Candidates ===
==== Declared ====
- Mike Johnson (Republican), incumbent U.S. representative and vice chair of the House Republican Conference

=== Endorsements ===
Mike Johnson (R)

U.S. executive branch officials

- Donald Trump, 45th president of the United States (2017–2021)

=== General election ===
==== Predictions ====
Source	Ranking	As of
The Cook Political Report	Solid R	March 31, 2022
Inside Elections	Solid R	May 24, 2022
Sabato's Crystal Ball	Safe R	April 6, 2022
Politico	Solid R	April 5, 2022
RCP	Safe R	June 9, 2022
Fox News	Solid R	July 11, 2022
DDHQ	Solid R	July 20, 2022
538	Solid R	June 30, 2022

=== Results ===
Louisiana's 4th congressional district, 2022
Party	Candidate	Votes	%
Republican	Mike Johnson (incumbent)	Unopposed	
Total votes		N/A	100.0
Republican hold			

== District 5 ==
2022 Louisiana's 5th congressional district election
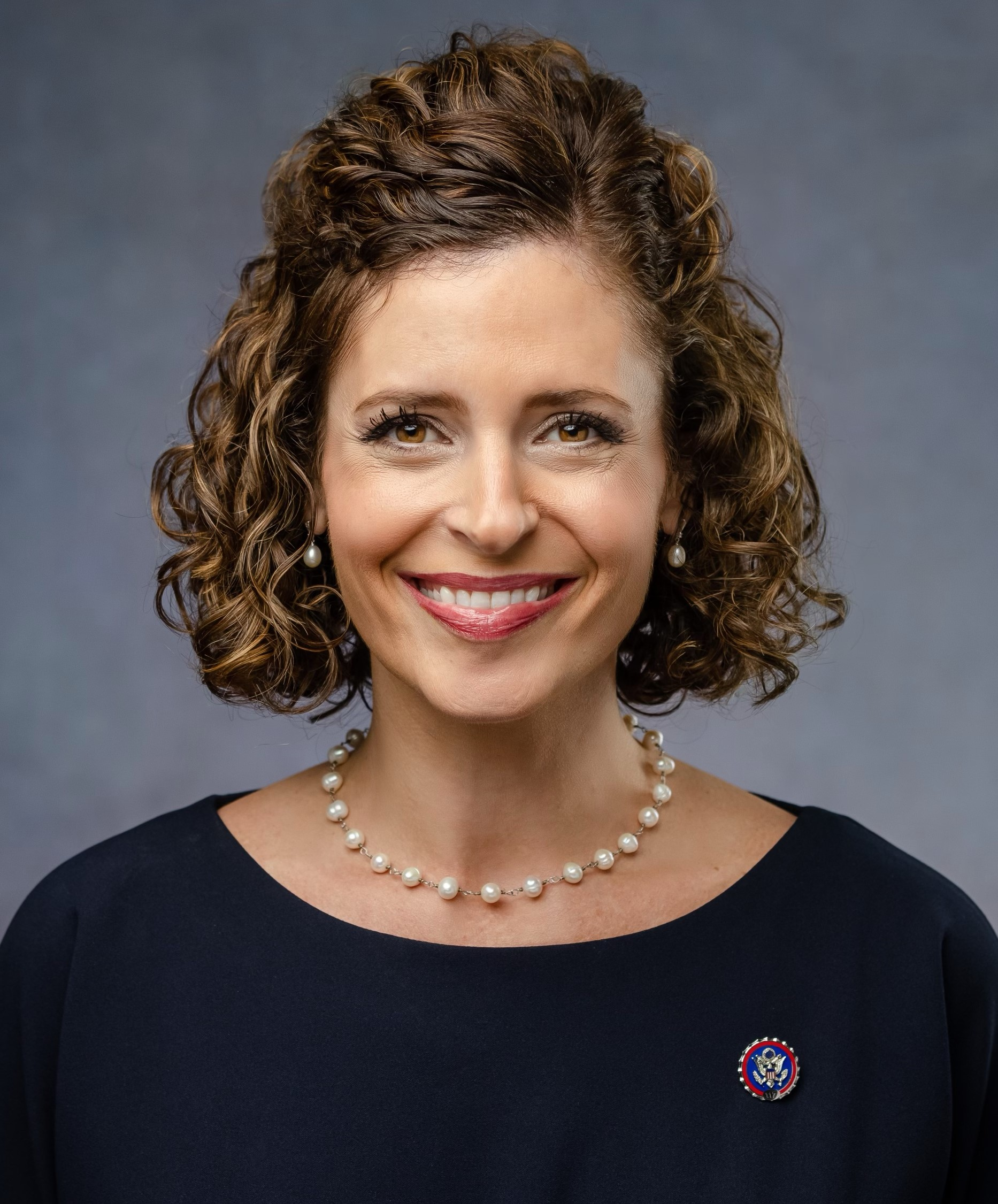

Candidate	Julia Letlow	Oscar Dantzler
Party	Republican	Democratic
Popular vote	151,080	35,149
Percentage	67.6%	15.7%
Candidate	Walter Earl Huff	Allen Guillory
Party	Democratic	Republican
Popular vote	19,383	12,159
Percentage	8.7%	5.4%
- Letlow: 30–40% 40–50% 50–60% 60–70% 70–80% 80–90% >90% Dantzler: 30–40% 40–50% 50–60% 60–70% 70–80% >90% Huff: 30–40% 40–50% 50–60% Pullen: >90% Tie: 30–40% 40–50% No votes
U.S. Representative before election
Julia Letlow
Republican
Elected U.S. Representative
Julia Letlow
Republican

The 5th district encompasses rural northeastern Louisiana, central Louisiana, as well as the northern part of Louisiana's Florida parishes in southeast Louisiana, taking in Monroe, Alexandria, Opelousas, Amite and Bogalusa, Louisiana. Republican Luke Letlow, who was elected in a runoff with 62.0% of the vote, died on December 29, 2020, of COVID-19, before he took office. Letlow's widow Julia won the 2021 special election with 64.9% of the vote.

=== Candidates ===
==== Declared ====
- Oscar "Omar" Dantzler (Democratic), candidate for governor in 2019
- Allen Guillory (Republican), perennial candidate
- Walter Earl Huff (Democratic), businessman
- Julia Letlow (Republican), incumbent U.S. representative
- Hunter Pullen (Republican), U.S. Army veteran

=== Endorsements ===
Julia Letlow (R)

Organizations

- Congressional Leadership Fund

=== General election ===
==== Predictions ====
Source	Ranking	As of
The Cook Political Report	Solid R	March 31, 2022
Inside Elections	Solid R	May 24, 2022
Sabato's Crystal Ball	Safe R	April 6, 2022
Politico	Solid R	April 5, 2022
RCP	Safe R	June 9, 2022
Fox News	Solid R	July 11, 2022
DDHQ	Solid R	July 20, 2022
538	Solid R	June 30, 2022

=== Results ===
Louisiana's 5th congressional district, 2022
Party	Candidate	Votes	%
Republican	Julia Letlow (incumbent)	151,080	67.6
Democratic	Oscar "Omar" Dantzler	35,149	15.7
Democratic	Walter Earl Huff	19,383	8.7
Republican	Allen Guillory	12,159	5.4
Republican	Hunter Pullen	5,782	2.6
Total votes		223,553	100.0
Republican hold			

== District 6 ==
2022 Louisiana's 6th congressional district election
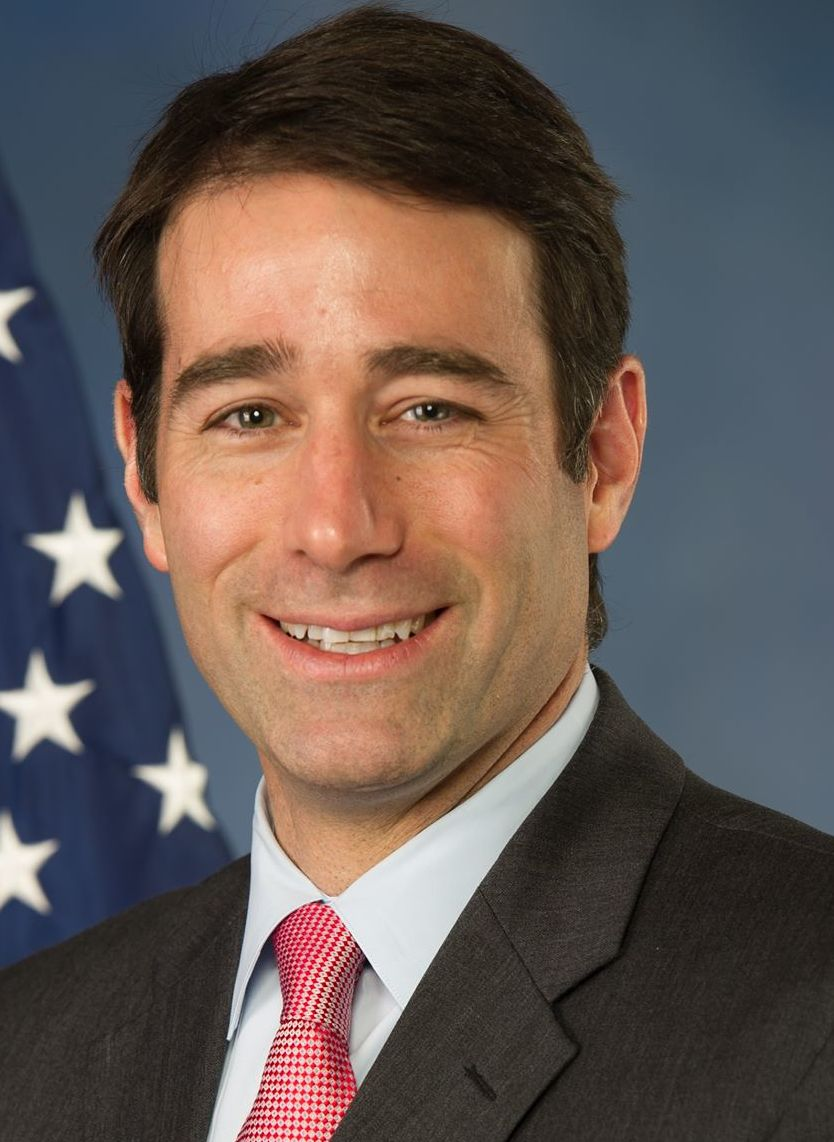

Candidate	Garret Graves	Rufus Holt Craig	Brian Belzer
Party	Republican	Libertarian	Republican
Popular vote	189,684	30,709	15,535
Percentage	80.4%	13.0%	6.6%
- Graves: 40–50% 50–60% 60–70% 70–80% 80–90% >90% Craig: 40–50% 50–60% No votes
U.S. Representative before election
Garret Graves
Republican
Elected U.S. Representative
Garret Graves
Republican

The 6th district encompasses the suburbs of Baton Rouge. The incumbent was Republican Garret Graves, who was re-elected with 71.0% of the vote in 2020.

=== Candidates ===
==== Declared ====
- Brian Belzer (Republican), businessman
- Rufus Holt Craig (Libertarian), former chair of the Louisiana Libertarian Party and perennial candidate
- Garret Graves (Republican), incumbent U.S. representative

==== Endorsements ====
Garret Graves

Organizations

- Citizens for Responsible Energy Solutions

=== General election ===
==== Predictions ====
Source	Ranking	As of
The Cook Political Report	Solid R	March 31, 2022
Inside Elections	Solid R	May 24, 2022
Sabato's Crystal Ball	Safe R	April 6, 2022
Politico	Solid R	April 5, 2022
RCP	Safe R	June 9, 2022
Fox News	Solid R	July 11, 2022
DDHQ	Solid R	July 20, 2022
538	Solid R	June 30, 2022

=== Results ===
Louisiana's 6th congressional district, 2022
Party	Candidate	Votes	%
Republican	Garret Graves (incumbent)	189,684	80.4
Libertarian	Rufus Holt Craig	30,709	13.0
Republican	Brian Belzer	15,535	6.6
Total votes		235,928	100.0
Republican hold			

== Notes ==
Partisan clients
