= Darrell Ourso =

American politician

Member of the Louisiana House of Representatives from the 66th district
- In office April 2015 – January 11, 2016
- Preceded by: Hunter Greene
- Succeeded by: Rick Edmonds

Personal details
- Party: Republican

Darrell Ourso is an American politician. He served as a Republican member for the 66th district of the Louisiana House of Representatives.

In 2015, Ourso won the 66th district of the Louisiana House of Representatives, running against Buddy Amoroso and Rick Bond. He succeeded Hunter Greene. In 2016, Ourso was succeeded by Rick Edmonds after losing his bid for re-election. He also served as a member of the Baton Rouge Metro Council from 1999 to 2008.
