= Emily Chenevert =

American politician

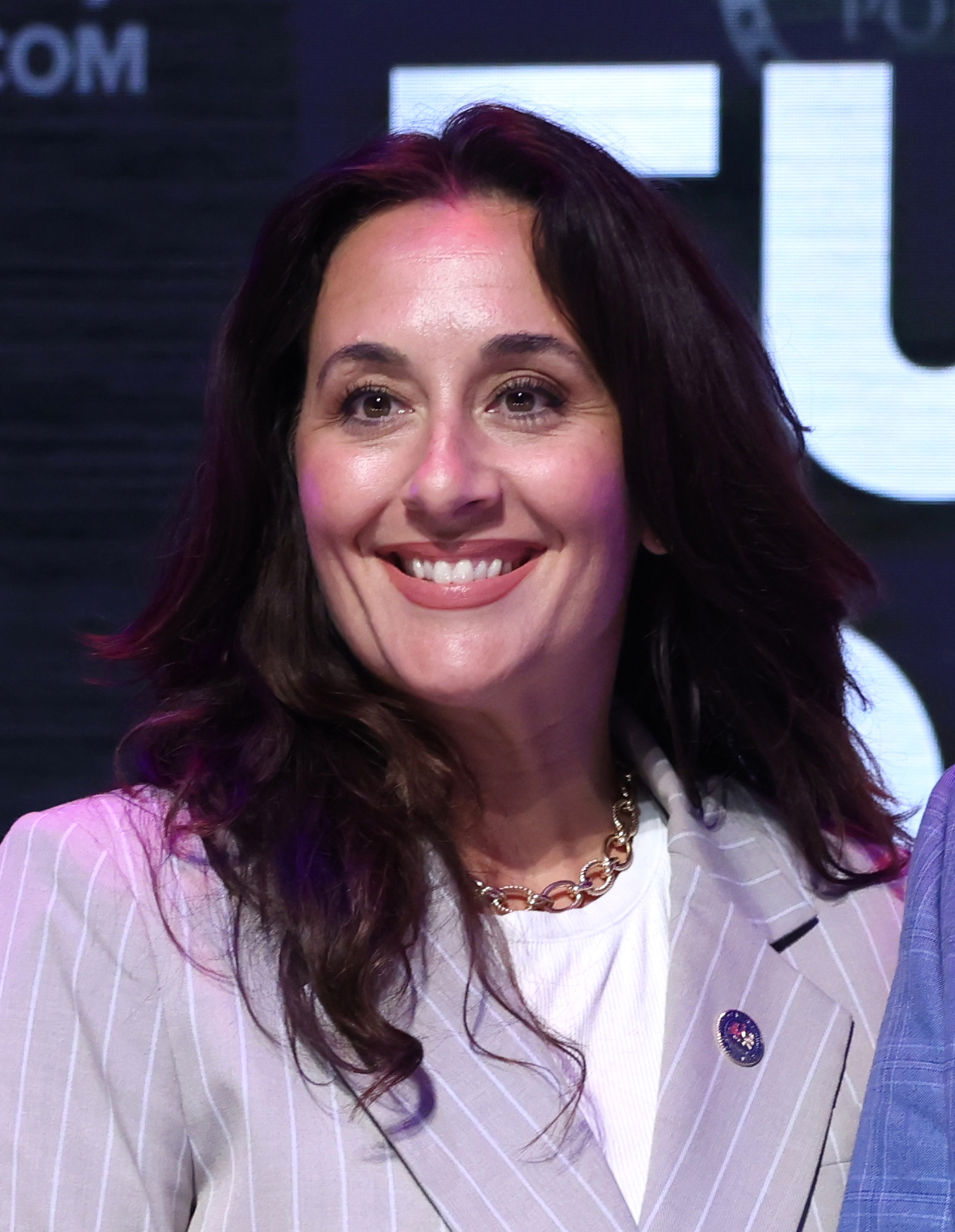

Member of the Louisiana House of Representatives from the 66th district
- Incumbent
- Assumed office January 8, 2024
- Preceded by: Rick Edmonds

Personal details
- Party: Republican
- Education: Louisiana State University (BA); New York Film Academy
- Occupation: Journalist

Emily Chenevert is an American politician serving as a member of the Louisiana House of Representatives from the 66th district. A member of the Republican Party, Chenevert represents parts of East Baton Rouge Parish and has been in office since January 8, 2024.
