= Marcus Hunter =

American politician (born 1979)

Marcus Lamar Hunter

Judge of the Louisiana 4th Judicial District Court (ES 1, Div. G)
- Incumbent
- Assumed office 2019

Louisiana State Representative for District 17 (27 precincts in Ouachita Parish)
- In office January 9, 2012 – 2018
- Preceded by: Rosalind D. Jones
- Succeeded by: Pat Moore

Personal details
- Born: January 3, 1979 (age 47) Monroe, Ouachita Parish; Louisiana, USA
- Party: Democratic
- Children: one child
- Education: Julia C. Wossman High School Southern University Southern University Law Center
- Occupation: Lawyer

Marcus Lamar Hunter (born January 3, 1979) is an American politician and second generation attorney from Monroe, Louisiana. A Democrat, Hunter is judge of the Louisiana 4th Judicial District Court, ES 1, Div. G. He won the position, 53-47 percent), in the primary election held on November 6, 2018, in conjunction with congressional general elections in the other forty-nine states.

From 2011 to 2018, he was a member of the Louisiana House of Representatives for District 17, which encompasses parts of the cities of Monroe and West Monroe and the towns of Richwood and Bawcomville. He served on the Civil Law, Insurance, and Labor committees. In his second year, he was named to the Commerce Committee and later sat on the House Ways & Means Committee.

== Background ==
A lifelong resident of Monroe, Hunter attended public schools there. A graduate of the Julia C. Wossman High School in Monroe, Hunter received in 2002 a Bachelor of Arts degree in Sociology from Southern University and a Juris Doctor in 2005 from the Southern University Law Center, both in the capital city of Baton Rouge. After being admitted to the Louisiana Bar Association, Hunter opened a small business, United Title of Northeast Louisiana, and is an attorney in Willie Hunter Jr., and Associates, at which he practiced alongside his father and brother.

== Political life ==
Hunter successfully ran for the Louisiana House of Representatives District 17 seat in the general election held on November 16, 2011. He defeated a large field of candidates including seasoned politicians and businesspersons to become the first representative of the newly-drawn District 17, which includes twenty-seven precincts in Ouachita Parish. This diverse district is composed largely of shopping malls, restaurants, hotel districts, three hospitals – Glenwood, St. Francis, and E. A. Conway, as well as other major corporations within the Monroe/ West Monroe area. Additionally, Hunter has been instrumental in many important issues in the legislature. With his support of the Rainy Day Fund, fight to keep taxes down, and eliminate unpredictable contingencies and the reliance on non-recurring revenue for ongoing expenses, his focus has been on making responsible decisions to address the state’s $165 million deficit from fiscal year 2012–13 and $1.2 billion shortfall for 2013–14. As a result, Hunter has worked steadfastly to decrease total spending by $1.3 billion and matched nearly all of the non-recurring revenue originally placed in the budget with one-time expenses.

Hunter was ranked 21 percent cumulatively by the interest group, the Louisiana Association of Business and Industry, but he garnered a 67 percent rating in the 2013 legislative session. Representative Hunter also has an A+ rating with the teachers unions in Louisiana (LAE/LFT). Hunter has worked to lobby the U.S. Congress to modify the Biggert-Waters Act and the Voting Rights Act of 1965 to benefit the constituents of his district.

Hunter was a member of the Louisiana Legislative Black Caucus (previously serving as treasurer), Democratic Caucus and the Rural Caucus. Hunter previously served as the 5th Congressional District representative on the state Democratic Party executive committee, under the chair, State Senator Karen Carter Peterson. In December 2013, the Louisiana Bar Association appointed Hunter to the House of Delegates for the 4th Judicial District Court.

Hunter handily defeated two opponents, Republican Heath Albritton and Democrat Billye Burns, both of West Monroe, in the primary election held on October 24, 2015. He received 4,337 votes (62 percent) to Albritton's 1,496 (21.4 percent) and Burns' 1,166 (16.7 percent).

Preceded by Missing	Judge of the Louisiana 4th Judicial District Court (ES-1, Div. G); 2019–	Succeeded by Incumbency pending
Louisiana House of Representatives
Preceded by Rosalind D. Jones	Louisiana State Representative for District 17 (27 precincts in Ouachita Parish); 2012–2018	Succeeded by Successor pending
