= Louisiana's 6th State Senate district =

American legislative district

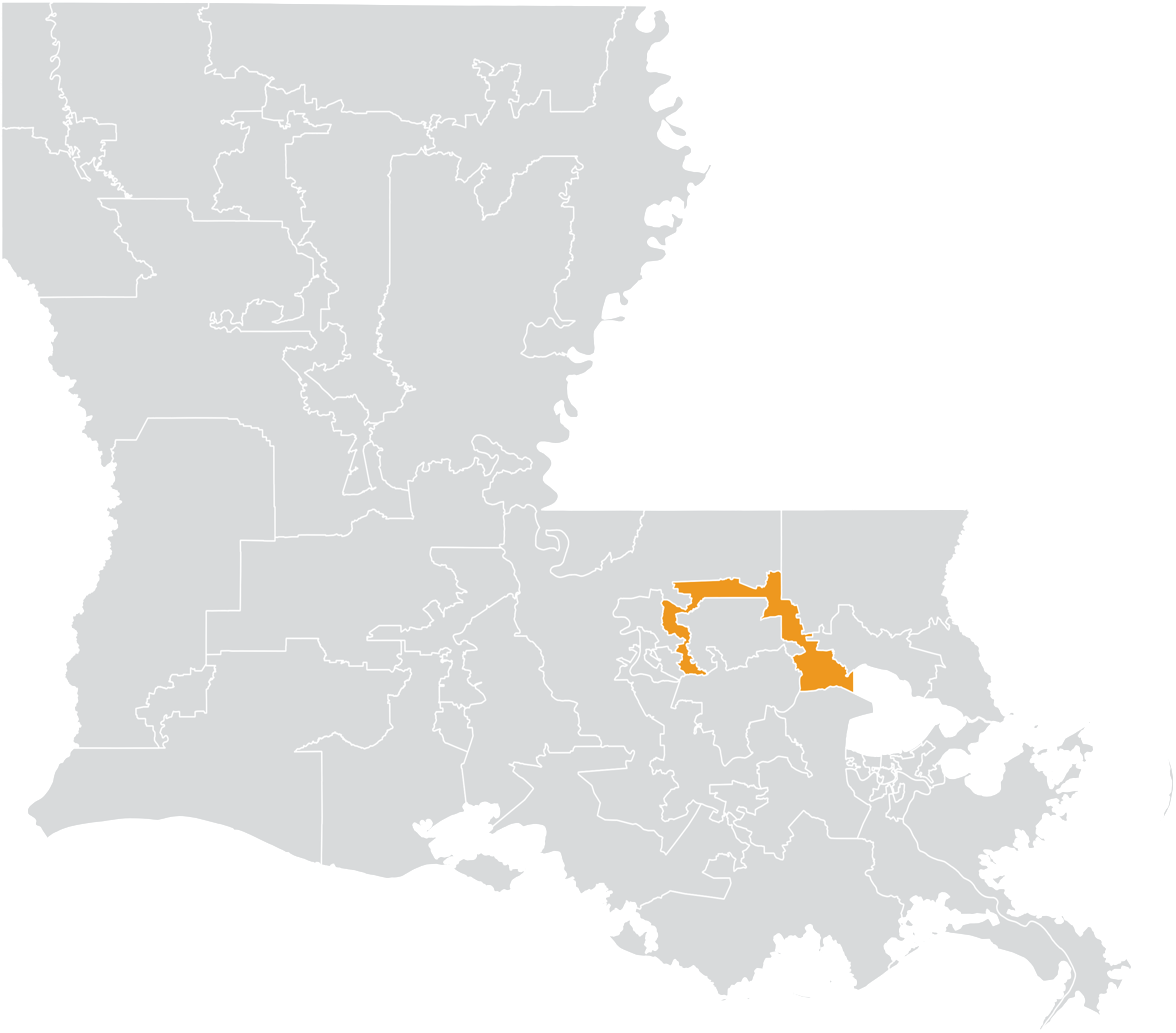
Senator
Bodi White; R–Central
- Registration: 38.2% Republican; 34.8% Democratic; 27.0% No party preference
- Demographics: 62% White; 28% Black; 5% Hispanic; 3% Asian; 3% Other
- Population (2019): 127,970
- Registered voters: 82,244

Louisiana's 6th State Senate district is one of 39 districts in the Louisiana State Senate. It has been represented by Republican Bodi White since 2012.

== Geography ==
District 6 snakes along a portion of Louisiana's Florida Parishes, including parts of East Baton Rouge Parish outside of Baton Rouge and smaller sections of Livingston, St. Helena, and Tangipahoa Parishes. The district covers some or all of Ponchatoula, Hammond, and Central, as well as a small part of Lake Pontchartrain.

The district overlaps with Louisiana's 1st, 5th, and 6th congressional districts, and with the 64th, 65th, 66th, 69th, 72nd, 73rd, 86th, and 95th districts of the Louisiana House of Representatives.

== Recent election results ==
Louisiana uses a jungle primary system. If no candidate receives 50% in the first round of voting, when all candidates appear on the same ballot regardless of party, the top-two finishers advance to a runoff election.

=== 2019 ===
2019 Louisiana State Senate election, District 6
Party	Candidate	Votes	%
Republican	Bodi White (incumbent)	29,549	79.5
Libertarian	Rufus Craig	7,600	20.5
Total votes		37,149	100
Republican hold			

=== 2015 ===
2015 Louisiana State Senate election, District 6
Party	Candidate	Votes	%
Republican	Bodi White (incumbent)	Unopposed	100
Total votes		Unopposed	100
Republican hold			

=== 2011 ===
2011 Louisiana State Senate election, District 6
Party	Candidate	Votes	%
Republican	Bodi White	12,886	51.7
Republican	Mike Mannino	12,047	48.3
Total votes		24,933	100
Republican hold			

=== Federal and statewide results ===
Year	Office	Results
2020	President	Trump 66.0–32.1%
2019	Governor (runoff)	Rispone 53.0–47.0%
2016	President	Trump 67.2–28.8%
2015	Governor (runoff)	Edwards 51.0–49.0%
2014	Senate (runoff)	Cassidy 68.9–31.1%
2012	President	Romney 69.2–29.1%
